= Underdog (disambiguation) =

An underdog is a participant in a fight, conflict, or game who is not expected to win.

Underdog may also refer to:

== Books ==
- Underdog (novel), a 2001 novel by Swedish author Torbjörn Flygt
- "The Underdog", a Hercule Poirot short story by Agatha Christie in the collection The Adventure of the Christmas Pudding
- The Underdog (novel), a 1999 children's novel by Markus Zusak
  - Underdogs (anthology), a 2011 omnibus edition of Zusak's first three novels
- Topdog/Underdog, a 2002 play by Suzan-Lori Parks

== Film and TV ==
=== Film ===
- The Underdog (1943 film), an American drama film
- Underdog (2007 film), a live-action film based on the 1964 TV cartoon series of the same name
- Underdogs (2013 Argentine film), an animated Argentine football film
- Underdogs (2013 American film), a high-school American football film
- Underdog (2018 film), a South Korean animated film
- Underdog (2021 film), a documentary film
- The Underdoggs, a 2024 American football film

=== Television ===
- Underdog (TV series), an American animated television show
- The Underdog Show, a British dog-training show
- Underdogs (TV series), a Canadian consumer-advocacy show
- Underdogs, an Irish-language reality show on TG4
- "Underdogs" (Friday Night Lights), an episode of the TV series Friday Night Lights
- "The Underdog", an Agatha Christie's Poirot episode

== Music ==
=== Albums ===
- The Underdog (Aaron Watson album), 2015
- Underdog (Atlanta Rhythm Section album), 1979
- Underdog (Audio Adrenaline album), or the title song
- Underdog (Brutto album), or the title song
- The Underdog, an album by Stef Lang
- The Underdog EP, by Yellowcard, or the title song, "Underdog"
- The Underdog/El Subestimado, by Tego Calderón
- Underdogs (album), by the Matthew Good Band
- Underdogz EP, by the Axe Murder Boyz, or the title song
- Underdog, an album by Exilia
- Underdog: Original Soundtrack, the soundtrack album from the film

=== Songs ===
- "Underdog" (Alicia Keys song), 2020
- "Underdog" (Ida song), 2013
- "Underdog" (Kasabian song), 2009
- "Underdog" (You Me at Six song), 2010
- "Underdog" (Banks song), 2017
- "Underdogs" (song), a 2007 song by Manic Street Preachers
- "The Underdog" (song), by Spoon
- "Underdog", by Anastacia, the B-side of "Cowboys & Kisses"
- "Underdog", by Imagine Dragons from Night Visions
- "Underdog", by the Jonas Brothers from It's About Time
- "Underdog", by Lacuna Coil from Shallow Life
- "Underdog", by Lil Baby and Gunna from Drip Harder
- "Underdog", by The Lost Trailers
- "Underdog", by Motionless in White from Infamous
- "Underdog", by Rock Star Supernova from Rock Star Supernova
- "Underdog", by the Script from Sunsets & Full Moons
- "Underdog", by Sly & the Family Stone from A Whole New Thing
- "Underdog", by Testeagles from Non Comprehendus
- "Underdog (Save Me)", by Turin Brakes from The Optimist LP
- "The Underdog", by Reks from Rhythmatic Eternal King Supreme
- "Underdogs", by Madder Mortem from Red in Tooth and Claw
- "Underdog", by Green Day from the deluxe edition of Saviors

== Other music ==
- Underdog Records, a Chicago record label whose releases include Screeching Weasel
- Underdog, an American hardcore punk band with one release from Revelation Records
- Underdog Records, a French record label

== Other ==
- Underdog (advertising character), featured on National Accident Helpline commercials
- Suzanne Muldowney (born 1952), American performance artist
- Haifa Underdogs, an American football club in the Israeli Football League
- Turnspit dog, a breed of dog also known as the Underdog
- Underdog Productions, an American animation studio
- FC Underdog Chist, a Belarusian football club based in Chist, Minsk Oblast

== See also ==
- The Underdogs (disambiguation)
