= Underdogs (anthology) =

Novel by Markus Zusak

- Author: Markus Zusak
- Language: English
- Genre: Young adult fiction
- Publisher: Arthur A. Levine Books
- Publication date: 2011
- Publication place: Australia
- Media type: Print (Hardcover)
- Pages: 512
- ISBN: 9780545354424 (first edition, hardcover)
- OCLC: 701018682
- LC Class: PZ7.Z837 Un 2011 FT MEADE

Underdogs (2011) is an anthology by the Australian young adult fiction writer Markus Zusak. It consists of Zusak's first three books, The Underdog (1999), Fighting Ruben Wolfe (2000) and When Dogs Cry (2001).
