= Bridge of Clay =

Book by Markus Zusak

- Australian first edition (hardcover)
- Author: Markus Zusak
- Language: English
- Genre: Young adult fiction
- Published: 9 October 2018 (US & AUS); 11 October 2018 (UK)
- Publisher: Knopf (US); Transworld (UK); Picador (AUS)
- Media type: Print (hardback and paperback), ebook, audiobook
- Pages: 544 (US); 592 (UK & AUS)
- ISBN: 9780857525956

Bridge of Clay is a 2018 novel by Australian author Markus Zusak. It revolves around five brothers coming to terms with the disappearance of their father.

Bridge of Clay was released in the United States and Australia on 9 October 2018, and in the United Kingdom on 11 October 2018.

== Plot ==
The Dunbar boys live in a suburb of Sydney, in a house of mayhem and madness that only five young boys can cause. Left to their own devices after their mother, Penny Dunbar, died of cancer, and their father, Michael Dunbar, ran out on them, the boys do their best to get along through life. The novel starts with their father, referred to as 'the murderer', coming back into their lives requesting their help to build a bridge. All of the brothers refuse, except Clay—who betrays his family in this act. Clay leaves school to go help his father, but before leaving Sydney meets up with their neighbour Carey Novac at the Surrounds, an old abandoned horse stables, as they do every Saturday night. The two talk about the previous horseraces of the week and obsess over The Quarryman, a book about Michelangelo. Clay leaves Carey with the book, and she says he has to come back for it.

Meanwhile, several years and decades prior, a young Penny sits at the piano with her father Waldek, who hits her hands with a twig every time she gets a note wrong. Growing up in the Eastern Bloc, Waldek wants a bigger life for his daughter—he mentors her at the piano and reads her The Iliad and The Odyssey. Proficient at the piano, Penny plays many concerts all over the Eastern Bloc, and Waldek decides that at the age of 18, she will play a concert in Vienna and never return. She is in a camp for nine months before Australia accepts her for entry. Once in Sydney, Penny works as a cleaner and an English as a Second Language teacher, but still misses her father and the piano. Eventually, she decides to gather up her savings and buy a piano, which instead of being delivered to her address, is delivered to Michael Dunbar, who lives further down on the same street. Michael, broken after the divorce from his wife Abbey, finds beauty in the world again through Penny. They get married and live happily in their house with their five sons until Penny gets cancer. Death creeps in, and at the end of her life Clay, not Michael, is the one to spend her final moments with her, outside in the garden underneath the clothesline.

Work on the bridge goes slow, and as the months and the work drags on, Clay returns several times to Sydney to see his brothers, and Carey, whose jockey career is coming along smoothly. She races several times, and always goes to the Surrounds every Saturday night. Carey wins most of her races, and eventually gets put up for a Group One race. The night before, she meets Clay at the Surrounds, and they sleep together. Carey wins the race, gets injured, and dies the next day. Overcome by grief, Clay blames himself for Carey's death and decides he must finish the bridge. Eventually the bridge is finished, and Clay disappears across the world for many years until he returns for Matthew's wedding. In the end all the brothers are together, at home.

== Characters ==
- Clay Dunbar – the fourth Dunbar boy, and main protagonist of the book. Characterised as a quiet and sensitive boy, who always had a love for storytelling and Michelangelo, and bears the weight of their mother's death the hardest.
- Matthew Dunbar – the oldest Dunbar boy, and narrator of the book. As the oldest brother, responsibility to take care of the family fell to him once their father left.
- Rory Dunbar – the second Dunbar boy, who is ready to fight the entire world with just his fists.
- Henry Dunbar – the third Dunbar boy, who spends his days working and his evenings either drunkenly stealing mailboxes or living on a visual diet of films from the 1980s.
- Tommy Dunbar – the fifth and youngest Dunbar boy. Characterised by his love for animals and the works of Homer, which is shown through the names of the family pets; Agamemnon (the fish), Hector (the cat), Achilles (the mule) and Telemachus (the pigeon).
- Michael Dunbar – father of the Dunbar boys, often referred to as 'the murderer', his story is one of the main plot lines throughout the work.
- Penelope 'Penny' Dunbar, née Lesciuszko – mother of the Dunbar boys, who died from cancer. Like Michael her backstory is also one of the main plot lines explored.
- Carey Novac – neighbour of the Dunbar boys, aspiring jockey and the love interest of Clay.

== Making of The Bridge of Clay ==
=== Writing process ===
In an interview with The Guardian in 2008, Zusak made the following comments:

I'm writing a book called Bridge of Clay—about a boy building a bridge and wanting it to be perfect. He wants to achieve greatness with this bridge, and the question is whether it will survive when the river floods. That's all I can say about it for now—not out of secrecy, but you just don't know what direction a book is going to take, no matter how well you've planned.

In March 2016, Zusak talked about his unfinished novel Bridge of Clay. He stated that the book was 90% finished but that, "... I'm a completely different person than the person who wrote The Book Thief. And this is also the scary thing—I'm a different person to the one who started Bridge of Clay eight, nine years ago ... I've got to get it done this year, or else I'll probably finally have to set it aside."

In the two decades of his writing process, Zusak went through several changes and challenges with the novel. He stated in an interview with Publishers Weekly that the most difficult problem was finding the right narrator, and giving that narrator the right voice. For six years a character named Maggie was the narrator of the novel, but upon revision was completely scrapped. His breakthrough of the book came when he first decided to quit the book—wherein he realised that he would not have been happy if he had done so, and "just had to finish it".

Zusak compared the writing of the book to The Odyssey, in the sense that the writing of the book was the war, and that a possible sequel to the book would be the exploration of coming home.

=== Publication process ===
Unlike his previous novels, Bridge of Clay had simultaneous publication in multiple countries. In this, Zusak had to make edits for each edition (UK, Australian and US). In an interview, he said he went from editing the Australian edition, then moved straight on to the American edition, and back once again to the Australian edition. The UK and Australian edition involved the same editing within copyediting; however, early on had three unique structural edits. Each edition involved work with its own editor—one for each country that all helped differently in their own ways, the most important part being to keep the editions consistent.

== Reception ==
=== Reviews ===
Publishers Weekly commented that Zusak builds tension skilfully by his use of foreshadowing and symbolism, which exposes the secrets of the story. They also praised his use of historical scope to create a "sensitively rendered tale of loss, grief, and guilt's manifestations". Though praising the book for its symbolic weight, The Washington Post points out that the work is burdened by its two decades of rewriting and revising, claiming the story to be 'extravagantly over-engineered'. The Guardian finds that much like his previous novel The Book Thief, Death plays a major part of this work—noting that 'death steals the show'. Noting that his use of colors often leads to "theatrical illumination", and that this work, unlike his former is "affirmatively full of life".

Kirkus Reviews criticises how the book romanticises the violent behavior of the brothers, and the expression of masculinity that reminisces on the "boys will be boys" attitude. Women in the novel are diminished to secondary roles of love interests and mothers. They note that the read requires "painstaking effort and patience". The Horn Book Magazine praises Zusak's talent for writing, but also points out that the "self-indulgent and elegiac prose" drowns out the good storytelling, effectively making the book too demanding for readers, regardless of age.

=== Sales ===
According to Nielsen BookScan, as of 4 March 2019, the book has sold 13,521 copies for £198,958 in the United Kingdom.

The novel has been shortlisted for the 2019 Indie Book Awards, chosen by Australian Independent Booksellers.
