= Nico Liersch =

German actor (born 2000)

- Born: 17 July 2000 (age 25); Munich, Germany
- Occupation: Actor
- Years active: 2007–present

Nico Liersch (born 17 July 2000) is a German actor. He is best known for his role as Rudy Steiner in the 2013 film The Book Thief. He is also known for his work in the German television series Das ist Gut where he played Phillip Greenyard, a caveman without parents.

== Personal life ==
Liersch was born on 17 July 2000 in Munich, Germany. He currently resides in Olching.

== Career ==
Nico started acting at the age of seven, when he appeared in a McDonald's Happy Meal commercial with Kai Pflaume. In 2008, he also appeared in a supporting role in Der Einsturz.

In 2012, Liersch appeared in episodes of the German TV series Inga Lindström and Das Traumhotel, then later feature film Kokowääh 2, a sequel to Kokowääh. In February 2013, he was cast in the film adaptation of the best-selling novel The Book Thief. He played Rudy Steiner, the best friend of the titular book thief, Liesel Meminger. Markus Zusak, who wrote the novel that inspired the movie, was pleased with Nico's portrayal of his character and wrote: ¨He's magnificent, indeed. He is Rudy.¨

== Filmography ==
Year	Title	Role	Notes
2008	Der Einsturz	Max Karge	TV movie
2009	Die geerbte Familie	Paul Eggert	TV movie
2010	Die Liebe kommt mit dem Christkind	Peter Eggert	TV movie
2011	Blackout	Kind	Short film
2011	Herzflimmern - Liebe zum Leben	Florian Tremmel	TV series, two episodes
2012	Das Traumhotel	Anton Ingenhoven	TV series, one episode
2012	Africa Cries Out to You	Jakob Wenninger	TV movie
2012	Inga Lindström	Lasse	TV series, episode: Ein Lied für Solveig
2012	Schafkopf		TV series, one episode
2013	Kokowääh 2	Max	—N/a
2013	KILIAN.	Nico	Short film
2013	The Book Thief	Rudy Steiner	—N/a
2016	Hanna's Sleeping Dogs	Michael Berger	—N/a
2017	In aller Freundschaft – Die jungen Ärzte	Felix Maibach	TV series, one episode
2018	Daheim in den Bergen	David	TV series, one episode
2020	SOKO München	Bruno	TV series
