= William McKenna (actor) =

Australian actor

- Occupation: Actor
- Years active: 2016–present
- Notable work: Harry Potter and the Cursed Child (2018–2020)

William McKenna is an Australian actor.

== Career ==
On stage, he starred as Draco Malfoy's son Scorpius in the Melbourne staging of Harry Potter and the Cursed Child from 2018 to 2020, a role for which he was nominated for Best Male Actor in a Supporting Role in a Play at the 19th Helpmann Awards and won Best Performance in a Theatre Production at the 37th Green Room Awards.

On television, he played Ben Ripley in Nowhere Boys and Ed Kennedy in The Messenger, an adaptation of Markus Zusak's novel of the same name.

In 2023, he starred as Matthew, a nervous personal assistant to the fictitious Australian monarch, in the BBC sitcom Queen of Oz, created by English comedian Catherine Tate.

== Filmography ==
=== Television ===
| Year | Title | Role | Notes | Ref. |
|---|---|---|---|---|
| 2016 | You're Skitting Me | Various | 26 episodes | |
| 2016–2018 | Nowhere Boys | Ben Ripley | Main role (seasons 3–4) | |
| 2023 | The Messenger | Ed Kennedy | Main role | |
| 2023 | Queen of Oz | Matthew | Main role | |
| 2025 | Good Cop/Bad Cop | Sam Szczepkowski | Supporting role | |
| 2025 | Heartbreak High | Sebastian | 5 episodes | |

=== Short films ===
| Year | Title | Role |
|---|---|---|
| 2018 | Skates | Boy |
| 2018 | Welcome Home | Jessica's Friend |
| 2021 | Breathe | Toby |
| 2022 | Go with Grace | Gem |

=== Theatre ===
| Year | Title | Role | Venue / Company | Ref. |
|---|---|---|---|---|
| 2018–2020 | Harry Potter and the Cursed Child | Scorpius Malfoy | Princess Theatre | |
| 2022 | Admissions | Charlie Luther Mason | Melbourne Theatre Company | |
| 2023 | Bernhardt/Hamlet | Maurice Bernhardt | Melbourne Theatre Company | |
