= The Messenger (TV series) =

- Based on: The Messenger by Markus Zusak
- Written by: Kirsten Fisher; Kim Wilson; Magda Wozniak; Sarah Lambert
- Directed by: Daniel Nettheim; Helena Brooks; Kim Wilson; Jennifer Leacy
- Starring: William McKenna; Maggie Dence; Alexandra Jensen; Chris Alosio; Kartanya Maynard
- Composer: Bryony Marks
- Country of origin: Australia
- No. of seasons: 1
- No. of episodes: 8

Production
- Executive producers: Helen Bowden; Markus Zusak; Dominika Zusak; Sarah Lambert; Daniel Nettheim
- Producers: Jason Stephens; Elisa Argenzio
- Cinematography: Geoffrey Hall
- Editors: Nick Holmes; Nicole La Macchia; Adrian Rostirolla
- Running time: 50-56 minutes
- Production company: Lingo Pictures

Original release
- Network: ABC
- Release: 14 May – 2 July 2023

The Messenger is an Australian television series based on the eponymous novel written by Markus Zusak, broadcast on ABC. The eight-part series was released on 14 May 2023. The show follows a young taxi driver named Ed Kennedy as he starts receiving mysterious playing cards with addresses and times on them and the repercussions the cards have on Ed and his friends.

== Cast ==
- William McKenna as Ed Kennedy, a 19-year-old cab driver who begins the series taking some risky actions to stop a store robbery. The attention sparked by his intervention lead to him receiving mysterious messages written by hand on an ace of diamonds, that end up completely upending his outlook on life.
- Alexandra Jensen as Audrey Singer, a precocious young woman who is reluctant to move away from her home town and engage in long-term relationships due to enduring feelings for Ed, while combatting a hatred that fuels a series of petty vengeances against her absent father.
- Chris Alosio as Marv Leota, a young man working at his father's construction firm who has a peculiar obsession with winning plush toys from grabber machines.
- Kartanya Maynard as Ritchie Moran, a troubled young woman who seeks to live as normal a life she can through her mental illness, via the decision to avoid taking her medication.
- Justin Smith as Snr Sergeant Hal Kaine, a police officer who demonstrates peculiar behaviour towards Ed as he solves the messages he has been set.
- Maggie Dence as Milla Roseby, an elderly woman who confuses Ed for her late husband Jimmy, but nevertheless enjoys his company and enables him to learn lessons about the importance of friendship.
- Sandy Greenwood as Tanya Moran
- Maya Stange as Julie Singer
- Jack Finsterer as Gregor Kennedy
- Felix Williamson as Don King
- Chris Haywood as Dr Nadel
- Richard Brancatisano as Joe
- Nicholas Hope as Bernie
- Guy Edmonds as Gavin Rose

== Production ==
The Messenger's commission was announced in May 2022, as part of a suite of new original programming for ABC's 90th anniversary year, with production beginning in June 2022. The series was co-produced by FabFiction, a 'scripted co-production initiative' between three German public service broadcasters.

The series received investment from Screen Australia and Screen NSW, and is a Lingo Pictures production (part of ITV Studios). International sales are managed by All3Media International.

Producer Jason Stephens spoke of the "delight" at obtaining the rights to the book, which were "much sought after for years" by American producers. Zusak had been reluctant for years to allow an adaptation of the book, but was keen to have it take place in Australia, and allowed those working on the show a heavy degree of creative freedom, embracing the differences between the original book and the show, commenting that it was "a really dangerous path to be too loyal" to the source material and praised the writers for using the book as a "step-off to greater heights".

== Episodes ==
The series began on May 14, 2023, in a 8:20pm timeslot, with all episodes were available to stream via ABC iView from that date.

Due to low viewership, the series was moved to a later 9:30pm slot from its fourth episode.

No.	Title	Directed by	Written by	ABC airdate	Viewership
1	"Episode 1"	Daniel Nettheim	Sarah Lambert, Kirsty Fisher, Markus Zusak	May 14, 2023	528,000
Addresses: 25 Harrison Ave., 1pm; 59 Macedoni St., 5:30am; 45 Edgar St., midnight Card: Ace of Diamonds Young taxi driver Ed Kennedy inadvertently becomes the hero of the day when some uncharacteristic behaviour results in him thwarting a liquor store robbery. His face plastered across the news and the internet, his naturally stoic demeanour begins to break when his new position as the town's new saviour is bestowed upon him. Waking up to find a playing card - an Ace of Diamonds - with a random address and time in it in his mailbox, however, disturbs him. Initially thinking his friends - caught up in personal issues of their own, ranging from using medication for art, claw machine addiction, and late-night egging of a local business kingpin's car - are messing with him, he finds at the address Milla, a lonely, elderly woman with dementia, who believes Ed is her long-dead husband Jimmy. Ed becomes determined to provide the company she craves, and assuage her fears about her treatment of her husband as a wife, while discerning what his actions should be in response to two other addresses he receives and their inhabitants - a young woman running at 5:30am every morning, and an abused wife and girl where the patriarch returns drunk and violent every midnight.
2	"Episode 2"	Daniel Nettheim	Sarah Lambert, Kirsty Fisher, Markus Zusak	May 21, 2023	366,000
Addresses: 59 Macedoni St., 5:30am; 45 Edgar St., midnight (encircled) Card: Ace of Diamonds After receiving the strongest clue yet - a loaded gun - as to his instructions as to how to deal with the abusive man at Edgar St., Ed's desperation to be rid of the pressure it all brings gets to him. Roping Ritchie and Marv into his plan goes awry; this, a less-than-complimentary encounter with his mother, a fraught appearance in court, a continued failure to determine what's going wrong with the girl at Macedoni St., and a seemingly complete breakdown in his friendship with Audrey sends him spiralling into disbelief. The last resort option winds up being the first offered to him, and his trio of friends start to acknowledge the gravity of everything - rather than automatically go for disdain - as Ed struggles to carry out the task required of him, earnestly trying not to become the man he believes is watching over him. Meanwhile, Ritchie begins to run out of road in her intentions to avoid her parents involving herself in her continued mental health problems, Audrey is cornered from two sides by a mother insistent she leaves her life in Moledale behind and the man she's been targeting for apparent revenge, and Marv's actions draw a combination of bemused mockery and veiled concern.
3	"Episode 3"	Helena Brooks	Kirsty Fisher, Markus Zusak	May 28, 2023	336,000
Previous card fully ticked; new card: Ace of Clubs, "Stones of Home". Names in riddle solution: Gavin Rose, Angie Caruso, Terence O'Reilly Ed finally delivers the right message to Macedoni St. Sophie, and is relieved his missions are now at an end. Waking up to discover a new card, however - this time a club of diamonds, "Stones of home" adorned across it, in his father's blazer - is a pleasant surprise, gradually convincing himself the messages are coming from him. A journey to his mother's to figure out the meaning results in him being lured to a secluded riverside spot by a mysterious, esoteric passenger, where his family used to enjoy picnics as kids. There, he finds three names on a bench beside the club symbol, and slowly uncovers the backstories of each. Ed and Marv's first target is Gavin Rose, a deadbeat father and gambling addict - who is sent the message he should be more attentive in taking care of his child - before Ed sets off for Terence O'Reilly, a priest estranged from his brother - and to whom the message comes courtesy of inconvenient assistance from a well-meaning Ritchie. Ed's saviour routine is interrupted by a visit to Milla, where an unexpected appearance by Audrey disturbs and upsets her, and Audrey tries her best to communicate to Ed her feelings about him, surreptitiously aware of his attraction to her. Meanwhile, Audrey is shocked to be told her revenge attacks on her absent father are not as secret as she would've liked, resolving to put an end to them for good, and Ritchie's sudden wish for she and Marv to have sex prompts more confusion between them than desired.
4	"Episode 4"	Kim Wilson	Kirsty Fisher, Markus Zusak	June 4, 2023	N/A
Names: Angie Caruso, Terence O'Reilly Card: Ace of Clubs Ed's questioning as to who Angie Caruso is gets off to a poor start, offending both O'Reilly brothers, with no clear reason why. Learning more about his own family's loss - in particular the discovery his father's grave is lacking a gravestone - spurs him on to ensure a path to family reunion is followed, and ropes his friends into holding an event at Terence's church, ostensibly just for free beer, but actually to commemorate Angie's death. However, finding a way to become close again to his own brother, and mother, proves troublesome, when Ed becomes irate at his brother's clear lack of interest in, and scorn for, him, as well as his attempts to cover up for his lack of interest in his father's death and its impact on Ed - with the gravity of his loss creeping into, and warping, his reality. In assisting Ed, Audrey begins to realise she is reciprocating his feelings for her, and is left conflicted between him and her boyfriend, Simon. Ritchie's mood and attitude towards life is lifted thanks to spiritual intervention - and the unintended consequences of the natural feel-good factor of self-pleasure, which ends up in a bout of claustrophobia-induced psychosis.
5	"Episode 5"	Jennifer Leacey	Magda Wozniak, Markus Zusak	June 11, 2023	N/A
New card: Ace of Spades. Names: Sylvia Plath, Graham Greene, Morris West. After being rescued from the open grave, Ed is in receipt of a new card, with various authors' names on them. Some library books and spade symbols next to page numbers later, Ritchie helps Ed establish they correspond to certain addresses; a desolated cinema with an idiosyncratic, bizarre, overenthusiastic, but well-meaning usher who all but pleads with Ed for his custom; a seemingly random family home where Ed learns they are constrained in how much Christmas spirit they can offer to their young children; and a visit to a restaurant, where he encounters the strange woman haunting him, with an unwelcome revelation about his mother's reinvigorated love life with police officer Hal. Frustrated and angry, as he processes the news, his ignorance of how his friends' involvement in solving the messages is affecting their bonds - and awareness of what's going on in their lives - becomes apparent; Milla appears to slip up and acknowledge she does not confuse Ed for Jimmy, Audrey's warming to Ed through his good deeds is ruined by her accidental admission she read his love letter and ends up rejecting him more emphatically than ever before, Ritchie's assistance of Ed causing her to take more risks - taking note of how motivated Ed became by his brush with death - in trying to achieve a feeling of self-actualisation, but failing badly, yet Marv's obsession with collecting plushies continuing to go unsaid, and unexplained.
6	"Episode 6"	Jennifer Leacey	Kirsty Fisher, Markus Zusak	June 18, 2023	N/A
Card: Ace of Spades; only the possible, questioned link to Ed's mother to be resolved. Ed is stunned by an epiphany, alongside frank admissions, that forces him to recognise his interference in others lives' was not at his behest or calling, but of those of the people he was called to save - they were helping him, rather than he helping them - and it becomes clear he needs to repair his relationships harmed by his arrogance and entitlement that his 'hero' persona tarnished him with, and attends a family Christmas as the first step. It going awry sees Ed confronted with the fact he knows little about those he believes he's been sent to help, his obsession with the messages causing him to focus mostly on why he has been called, rather than - and ignoring - those at the part of it and helping him solve them, and their agency. Milla joins Ed and his friends for a Christmas party, at which her forthright, outsider comments are heard, and resonate deeply, their impact further pronounced when Ed finds her having passed away in her sleep; Marv's irritation from his people-pleasing family Christmas sees him take a risk in order to recapture lost love, Ritchie overcompensates in the intense sense of freedom she feels the festivities have afforded her, while Audrey's attitude towards her father alters - albeit with a completely adverse and disproportionate response to all intrepid acts. Deciding to attend an arranged screening for both Ed and Milla at the cinema - of the adaptation of her favourite book, Wuthering Heights - the storyline of the cards distorts and presents Ed with the agonising truth about the messages that's been evading him and his consciousness ever since it began.
7	"Episode 7"	Daniel Nettheim	Kim Wilson, Markus Zusak	June 25, 2023	N/A
New card: Ace of Hearts; initially blank, then movie titles The Dirty Dozen, Lock, Stock and Two Smoking Barrels and War and Peace. Connection made to names Marv, Ritchie and Audrey respectively. Ed's latest playing card, initially blank, has suddenly sprouted film titles, ensuring he is kept in whatever game he's a part of - believing he's the one unconsciously orchestrating it - after he connects each of them to the names of his friends; with it being the last card, he assigns it the greatest importance, set on dedicating it to solving their problems - given how they have helped him with the others so far. First is Marv, still stinging from Suzanne's continued refusal to allow him to see his child; after hearing of Audrey's rejection by her father, he violently attempts to enact revenge on her behalf. Ed struggles to get him to persuade his ex - Marv feeling he can do no right by anyone - so takes the task on himself, getting a surprise visit from the young woman who is in some way connected to his receiving, and acting upon, the cards and the messages they intrinsically provide. Ritchie, now forced back on her medication, concludes she needs closure from the incident that prompted her trauma; accompanied by Audrey, she meets up with the girl she attacked at school, where her memories slowly fade back into view and she finally learns the blame for what happened does not lay solely upon her. A visceral reaction follows, intensely hurt that someone so close to her has taken away her life and any agency she once had in it.
8	"Episode 8"	Daniel Nettheim	Sarah Lambert, Markus Zusak	July 2, 2023	N/A
Names remaining unticked: Ritchie, Audrey. Card: Ace of Hearts The chaos of the sledge match cements the significance of both Ed's card with his friends' names upon it, as well as bringing to an end the problems that plague them - for his own sake and sanity - with he the one having placed them in the positions they are in. Ed's attempts to help, and to restore the bonds between, his friends have ended up tearing them apart, potentially irreparably; Marv is back at square one - locked up for the assault on Audrey's father, precluded from visiting his child - Audrey's internal conflict over whether she is of as little worth as her father told her causing her to flee lest she harms anyone else, while Ritchie teeters on the edge of losing whatever remaining freedom she had in her grasp, everyone unreceptive to her pleas. Ed's frantic attempts to contact Audrey - after being informed his feelings for her are, and have always been, reciprocated - are to no avail, and in acknowledging he cannot assume what others want and has to ensure any help he believes is needed actually is, instead prioritises Ritchie, offering her a chance for him to see the world through her eyes and to recognise she hasn't needed to be so desperate to be normal; being different - like everyone is - is enough. Someone previously saved by Ed's interventions sends Audrey back to Moledale to reunite with him for good, where she admits to her part in Ritchie's years-long suffering and owns her flawed sense of self and committal-fearful nature that is down to her father's abandonment, in presenting a deal with him to free Marv. Ed, hearing her imploring, opts to use Milla's funeral to assuage her fears and proclivity to abscond at the first sign of trouble or rejection, and her need to be told that she needn't be concerned he will exploit her vulnerability, nor reject her for speaking her truth.

== Broadcast ==
The series premiered on 14 May 2023.

== Reception ==
The show had a mixed critical reception, with the acting being praised, but the plotting criticised.

In a four-star review of the first four episodes, The Guardian's Luke Buckmaster said that it took him time to "get accustomed to The Messenger's idiosyncratic rhythms, but soon I relished returning to this world", noting a "strange alchemy between setting and character", with "lean and uncluttered" plotting. He praised the directors and screenwriters for "deftly balanc[ing] comedy and drama, creating a subtle and strange quirkiness", and for "trust[ing] in the nature and strength of the story and the cast, allowing scenes to breathe while keeping things progressing at a good pace", as well as the efforts by the programme's cinematographer to ensure "retro flavour is baked into the show's aesthetic".

TV Tonight's David Knox, in a three-and-a-half star review of the first two episodes, said the series "effectively asks you to leave your logic at the door and go with its heightened mix of drama, dark comedy and magic realism", praising McKenna as a "likeable lead", and that the series impressed upon him an attempt by ABC to appeal to younger viewers, doubtful it "will connect with core ABC viewers, and perhaps it might be best framed as premium YA content".

Mel Campbell, for ScreenHub, was more critical. In a two-and-a-half star review of the first four episodes, she opined that the series "often seems to deliberately withhold sense-making from the audience in pursuit of its air of mystery", and found the series flipping between what she saw as "realist drama or magical realism", and inconsistent motivations of the characters, as exasperating, yet nevertheless said "the cast do their best with this flawed material".

== See also ==
- Dispatches from Elsewhere, a 2020 American TV series with a similar premise.
