= The Underdogs =

The Underdogs may refer to:

== Literature ==
- The Underdogs (novel) (Los de abajo), a novel by Mariano Azuela
- The Underdogs, a novel and adapted play by William Weintraub

== Music ==
- The Underdogs (record producers), an American R&B/pop production duo
- The Underdogs (American band), a 1960s garage-rock band
- The Underdogs, a 1980s band from Leeds
- The Underdogs, a 1960s New Zealand band included on the compilation Golden Kiwis – The Hits Collection
- "The Underdogs", a song by Weezer from Raditude

== See also ==
- Home of the Underdogs, an abandonware archive website
- Los de Abajo (disambiguation)
- Underdog (disambiguation)
