= Nathan Morlando =

Canadian screenwriter and film director

Nathan Morlando is a Canadian screenwriter and film director. He is best known for his feature film debut Citizen Gangster, which won the Toronto International Film Festival Award for Best Canadian First Feature Film at the 2011 Toronto International Film Festival.

A graduate of the University of Toronto, Morlando debuted at the 2002 Toronto International Film Festival with his short film Countdown. He had already written the script for Citizen Gangster, which was slated to be directed by Denis Villeneuve in 2000. The film was not made at that time, however, and Morlando became its director by the time it finally moved forward in the 2010s.

He directed an episode of the television series Copper in 2013.

His second feature film, Mean Dreams, was released in 2016.
