= Torbjörn Flygt =

Swedish novelist

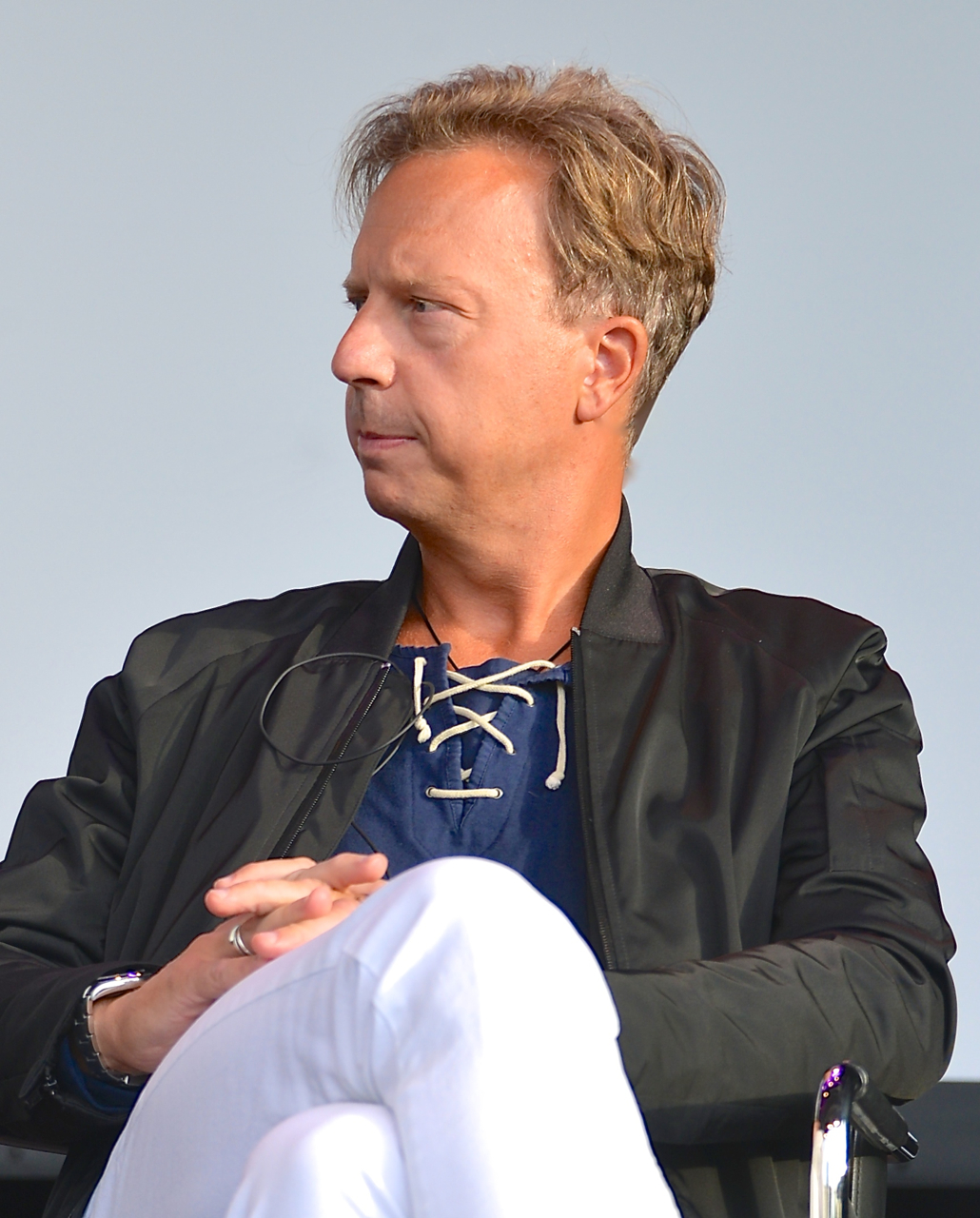
- Flygt in 2013
- Born: 14 June 1964 (age 61)
- Occupation: novelist
- Notable work: Underdog
- Awards: August Prize (2001)

Torbjörn Flygt (born 1964) is a Swedish novelist. He made his literary debut in 1995 with the novel Längsta ögonblicket. Among his other novels is Män vid kusten from 1997. He was awarded the August Prize in 2001 for the novel Underdog, a story set in Malmö.
