= The Underdog (novel) =

Novel by Markus Zusak

- Author: Markus Zusak
- Language: English
- Genre: Young adult fiction
- Publisher: Omnibus Books
- Publication date: 1999
- Publication place: Australia
- Media type: Print (Paperback)
- Pages: 140
- ISBN: 1862914133 (first edition, paperback)
- OCLC: 57513215

The Underdog (1999) is the first novel by Australian young adult fiction writer Markus Zusak. Along with Fighting Ruben Wolfe and When Dogs Cry, The Underdog was published in the United States in 2011 as part of the anthology Underdogs.

== Plot ==
The Underdog is about Cameron Wolfe, a 15-year-old boy and a down-and-out character, his family, and a girl he falls for. Cameron struggles with his identity, questions his morality, and tries to overcome feelings of inadequacy. Cameron shares a room with his older brother, Ruben, who is always coming up with petty criminal activities he never follows through with, such as robbing a dentist only to be distracted by the beautiful nurse working there. His sister, Sarah, is always "going at it" with her boyfriend, Bruce. His brother, Steve, is successful and thinks he is above the rest of his family. His mother works hard all week and still manages to complete motherly duties, and his father is a plumber. Cameron starts working for his father on weekends, where he meets Rebecca Conlon, a girl who he thinks is perfect. The culminating event of the novel is Sarah and Bruce's break-up. Her emotional reactions engages and unites all of the family. Cameron is particularly affected by the fallout and questions his own treatment of women. As the break-up is unfolding Cameron is also asked to help his former best friend, Greg, with some money issues. Greg gets entangled in a drug buying fiasco and Cameron must lend him the money to get him out. Much of the emotional landscape of the novel is established through Cameron's vivid dream sequences, which allow the reader a glimpse into his deeper feelings. The story is about boys' dirty habits, family sticking together and being an underdog.

== Characters ==
- Cameron Wolfe: A 15-year-old boy, he is the protagonist and first person narrator of the novel.
- Ruben Wolfe: Cameron's adventurous and slightly rebellious older brother.
- Steve Wolfe: The oldest of the Wolfe brothers. He has a successful career and looks down upon the silliness of his younger brothers.
- Sarah Wolfe: Cameron's older sister. She begins the novel in a serious relationship with Bruce. Their relationship consists of kissing on the Wolfe family's couch. Much of the novel's plot revolves around the story of her relationship.
- Mom: Cameron's mom, famous for cooking mushrooms every night.
- Dad: Cameron's dad. He works as a plumber and hires Cameron to work with him on Saturdays.
- Greg Fienni: Cameron's former best friend.
- Bruce Patterson: Sarah's boyfriend.
- Rebecca Conlon: Cameron's crush. He meets her while helping his father work on the plumbing at her house.

== Reception ==
In a review of Underdogs, Los Angeles Times reviewer Susan Carpenter notes Zusak's earlier works "share many of the same stylistic hallmarks and themes of belonging and survival" with his better-known novels including the Michael L. Printz Award-winning The Book Thief. The Age commented that Zusak's writing style was "relaxed and confident" and did not "try to explore social issues.
