= 2014 New York Film Critics Circle Awards =

80th New York Film Critics Circle Awards

80th NYFCC Awards

January 5, 2015

Best Picture:
Boyhood

The 80th New York Film Critics Circle Awards, honoring the best in film for 2014, were announced on December 1, 2014 and presented on January 5, 2015.

== Winners ==
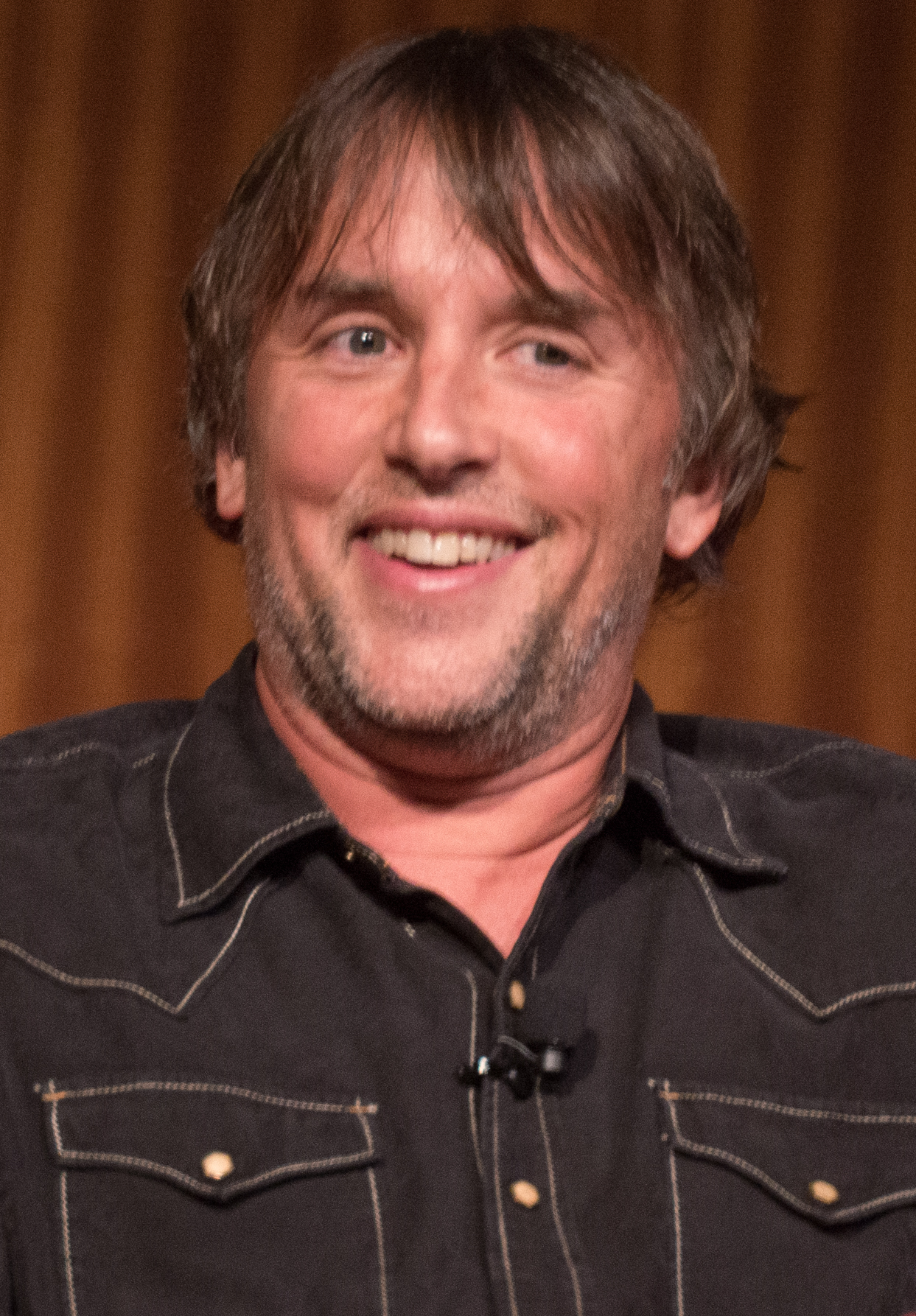
Richard Linklater, Best Director winner

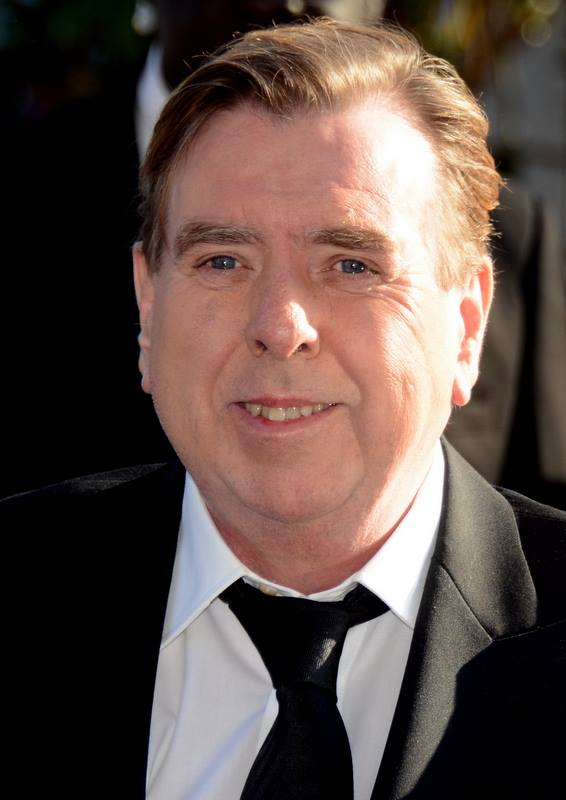
Timothy Spall, Best Actor winner

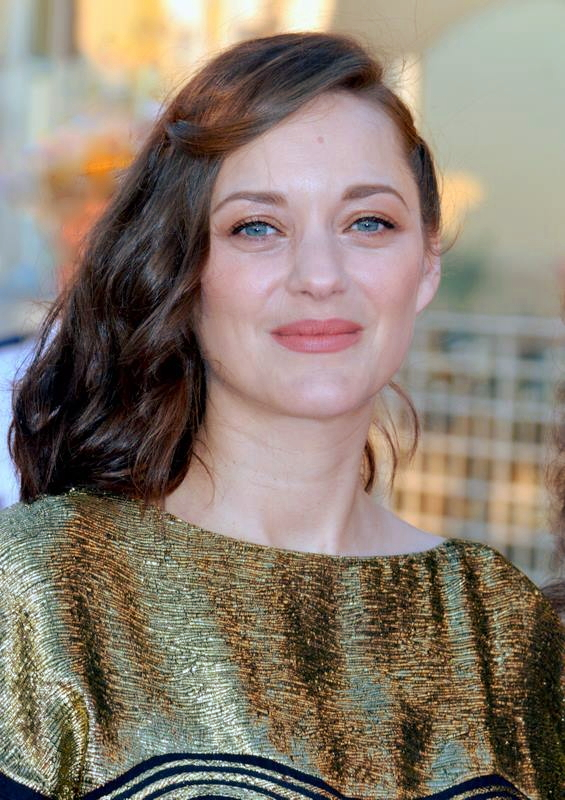
Marion Cotillard, Best Actress winner

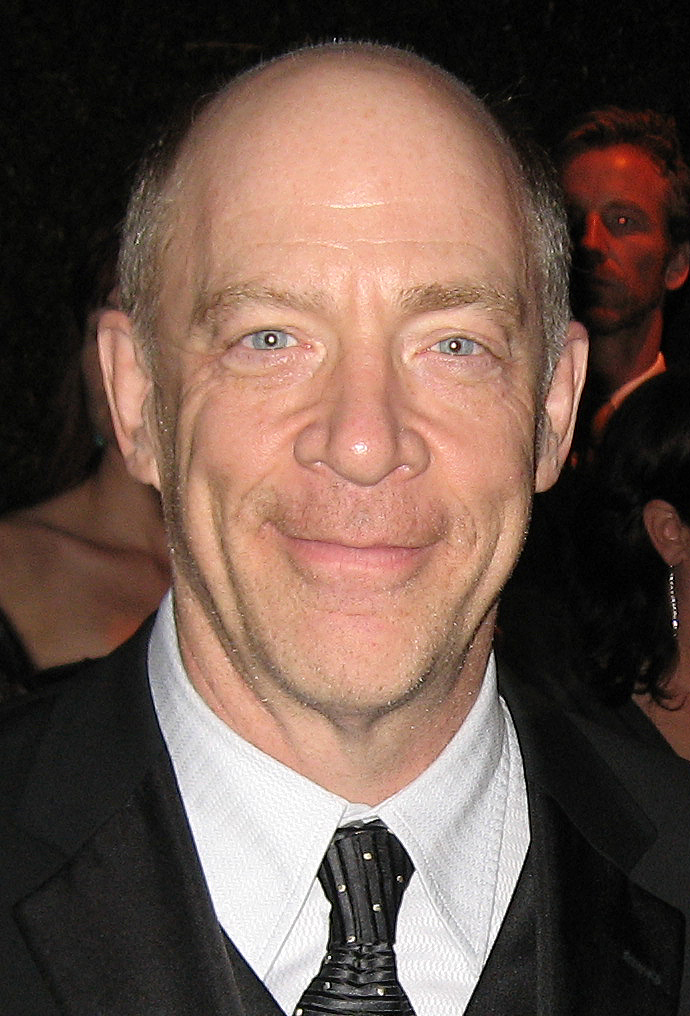
J. K. Simmons, Best Supporting Actor winner

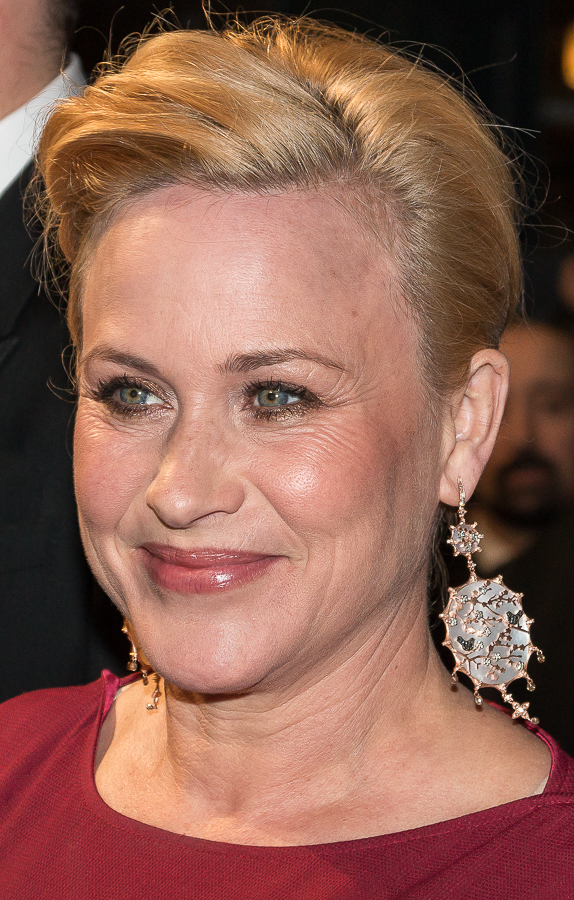
Patricia Arquette, Best Supporting Actress winner

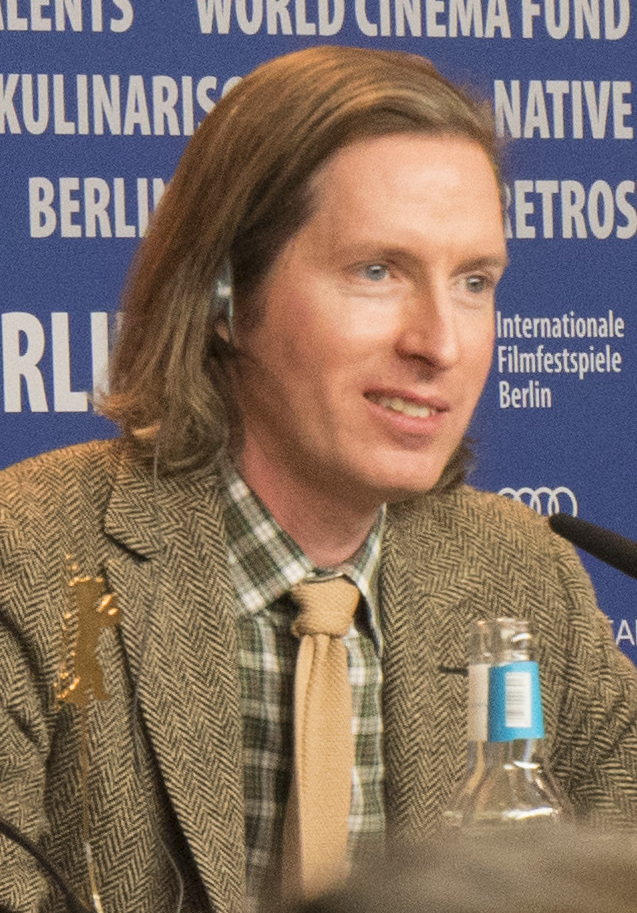
Wes Anderson, Best Screenplay winner

- Best Film:
  - Boyhood
- Best Director:
  - Richard Linklater – Boyhood
- Best Actor:
  - Timothy Spall – Mr. Turner
- Best Actress:
  - Marion Cotillard – Two Days, One Night and The Immigrant
- Best Supporting Actor:
  - J. K. Simmons – Whiplash
- Best Supporting Actress:
  - Patricia Arquette – Boyhood
- Best Screenplay:
  - Wes Anderson – The Grand Budapest Hotel
- Best Animated Film:
  - The Lego Movie
- Best Cinematography:
  - Darius Khondji – The Immigrant
- Best Non-Fiction Film:
  - Citizenfour
- Best Foreign Language Film:
  - Ida Poland
- Best First Film:
  - Jennifer Kent – The Babadook
- Special Award:
  - Adrienne Mancia
