= The Messenger (Zusak novel) =

Novel by Markus Zusak

- Australian paperback edition
- Author: Markus Zusak
- Language: English
- Publisher: Pan Macmillan
- Publication date: 10 January 2002
- Publication place: Australia
- Media type: Print (Hardcover and Paperback)
- Pages: 396 (first edition, paperback)
- ISBN: 0330363883

The Messenger, released in the United States as I Am the Messenger, is a 2002 novel by Markus Zusak, and winner of the 2003 Children's Book Council of Australia Book of the Year Award. The story is written from the perspective of the protagonist, taxi driver Ed Kennedy, whose journey begins after he stops a robbery and receives a playing card in the mail.

== Plot ==
The protagonist is Ed Kennedy, an uninspired 19-year-old Australian taxi driver. Ed laments his mediocre life: he lives alone and plays cards every week with his friends: Ritchie, who is unemployed and generally apathetic about life; Marv, a stingy carpenter; and Audrey, a fellow taxi driver whom Ed is in love with, although she does not reciprocate. His relationship with his mother is strained and his father died recently, leaving him a dog, the Doorman. After accidentally foiling a robbery he is proclaimed a hero by the public, though the robber warns that Ed is "a dead man" before being taken away by police.

One night, he receives a small unmarked envelope containing an Ace of Diamonds upon which is written three addresses and three times of day. Ed investigates, arriving at the first address at midnight to witness a man raping his wife while their daughter cries on the porch. The second corresponds to Milla, a senile widow who lives alone, and the third reveals a young girl named Sophie who runs barefoot every morning but cannot win at her track meets. Ed realizes that he's meant to involve himself with the three people and pretends to be Milla's husband Jimmy, who died 60 years ago during World War II. He visits her as Jimmy and begins to read to her weekly. He gives Sophie an empty shoe box to encourage her to try running barefoot at the next competition; she loses but finds pride in her achievement. Ed is unsure how to approach the rapist until he receives a gun in the mail with one bullet. Ed kidnaps the man and threatens him to stop raping his wife, but instead of killing him, he shoots at the sky and leaves.

Two masked men break into Ed's house, assault him, and leave him a congratulatory letter as well as an Ace of Clubs with a vague clue. Before going, the men inform Ed that the rapist has left town without his wife and daughter. The next day, Ed reveals his involvement in the cards to Audrey and tells her that he wishes they could be together, but Audrey declines. One day, Ed picks up a man who tells him to drive to the river. There, Ed finds a rock formation on which the three names are written. The first is Thomas O'Reilly, a pastor in a run-down area with a dwindling congregation; Ed helps by organizing a party with free beer to encourage a crowd to come on Sunday. The next, Angie Carusso, is a single mother whom Ed witnesses buying ice cream for her children; he buys her one as well to show that she is appreciated. Finally, Gavin Rose is a young boy who is constantly beaten by his brother; Ed beats up Gavin and the brothers unite to assault Ed, cementing their brotherhood.

The Doorman is stolen from a football match and Ed buys him back from a boy who gives him the Ace of Spades, which contains the names of three famous authors. After trying to kiss Audrey one day and being gently rejected again, he goes to the library and realizes that the names lead to book titles which certain street names are named after. Notes written on specific page numbers indicate addresses. The first, Glory Road, reveals the home of Lua Tatupu, decorated for Christmas with strings of broken lights, so Ed buys new ones and sets them up himself. On Clown Street, Ed runs into his mother on a date. He drives to her house and after a confrontation, they reconcile. Finally, on Bell Street he meets an old man named Bernie Price who runs an antiquated theater. Ed brings Audrey there to watch Cool Hand Luke and invites Bernie to watch it with them, but eventually the screen cuts to videos of Ed performing his tasks.

Ed finds the Ace of Hearts on his seat in the theatre, on which is written three movie titles. After consulting with Bernie, he recognizes references to his three friends: Ritchie, Marv, and Audrey. He talks to Ritchie late one night, the two standing in a river as Ed encourages him to search for something he cares about. Confused by Marv's stinginess, Ed asks him for a loan as a ploy, which causes Marv to reveal that he has been saving money to care for a child he had with a girl named Suzanne Boyd who moved away after she became pregnant years ago. Ed convinces him to travel to her house, where after being yelled at by Suzanne's father, Marv and Suzanne make amends and Marv is reconnected with their daughter. Finally, Ed comes to Audrey's place early one morning and dances with her for three minutes to show his love, hoping that she can love him back.

Ed returns elatedly to his place and finds a Joker with his own address written on it. One day, a passenger asks Ed to drive to every address he has visited, taking him on a tour of his accomplishments. The passenger is revealed as the robber, who asks Ed if he still sees "a dead man" when he looks in the mirror.

Ed returns home to find a man inside his house, who claims responsibility for the entire series of events. In a postmodern twist, the man is implied to be Markus Zusak himself, who has written Ed's story down to the current discussion they are having, and hands the manuscript to Ed before leaving. Ed stays inside for days before Audrey comes one afternoon and asks to stay with him for good. They kiss and Ed explains everything to her, before realizing that the story he resides in is a reminder to others of their true potential for good: "I'm not the messenger at all. I'm the message."

== Awards ==
The Messenger was named one of the best books of the year by Publishers Weekly and The Bulletin of the Center for Children's Books.

Year	Award	Category	Result	Ref.
2003	Children's Book of the Year Award: Older Readers	—	Winner	
2003	New South Wales Premier's Literary Awards	Ethel Turner Prize	Winner	
2006	Michael L. Printz Award	—	Honor	
2007	Deutscher Jugendliteraturpreis	Jugendjury	Winner	

== Adaptations ==
=== Stage ===
In 2008 the novel was adapted for the stage by Ross Mueller. It was first performed by the Canberra Youth Theatre on 24 November 2008.

In 2015 the novel was adapted for stage by Xavier Hazard and Archie Stapleton and performed by the Redfoot Youth Theatre Company in Perth, Western Australia.

=== Television ===
A TV series based on the novel premiered on ABC TV and iview on 14 May 2023, with William McKenna as Ed Kennedy. It was produced by Lingo Pictures productions, with major investment from Screen Australia in association with the ABC. Executive producers included Markus Zusak, and the ABC producers were Rebecca Anderson and Sally Riley.
