= Maja Wampuszyc =

American actress

Maja Wampuszyc is an American actress of stage and screen living in New York City. She was born and raised in metropolitan Detroit.

Wampuszyc made her Broadway debut as Ida Haller in 2009 in Irena's Vow at the Walter Kerr Theater. Her Off-Broadway credits include Geraldine Connelly in Paul Green's The House of Connelly at the ReGroup Theatre, the first person to play that role since Stella Adler in 1931; Ida Haller in Irena's Vow; Marina Petrova in James Armstrong's Foggy Bottom at The Abingdon Theater Company; and appearances at The Pearl Theatre Company. She also played a radio host in Zhu Yi's I am the Moon (partially based on the story of the Japanese pornographic star Ai Iijima), as part of the 2013 17th annual New York International Fringe Festival. Other New York City theater credits include: a Father in The Obie Award-winning play An Oak Tree by and with Tim Crouch at the Barrow Street Theatre (other fathers included F. Murray Abraham, Joan Allen, and Frances McDormand) and Rewriting Her Life, by Barbara Masry, directed by Tony Award winner Trazana Beverley. She has appeared in runs at HB Playwrights Foundation, MCC, Carnegie Hall, Metropolitan Museum, Theater for the New City, NYDIA and the Looking Glass Theater. She has also performed regionally. During the fall of 2014, she co-starred in a five-person ensemble in a revival of Mark Ravenhill's "Pool (no water)" Off-Broadway, once again at the Barrow Street Theater.

Wampuszyc's film credits include Mike Newell's Mona Lisa Smile (2003) and Henry Jaglom's Going Shopping (2006). In James Gray's 2013 film The Immigrant she plays Edyta, Ewa Cybulska's aunt, opposite Marion Cotillard. Wampuszyc was called upon by the feature's director, James Gray to advise upon her Oscar-winning French cast-mate's handling of the linguistic challenges presented in taking on the titular ethnic Polish role of the movie.

In 2014 Wampuszyc appeared in Steven Soderbergh's Cinemax television series "The Knick" as Mrs. Zygmund in the episode "Where's the Dignity".,

During the summer of 2016 Wampuzyc played Corrine in Richard Vetere's "Lady MacBeth and Her Lover' in Iron Spike Theatre inaugural production for the FringeNYC festival. The theater critic Everett Goldner writing for nytheater now said of her performance: "The raw intensity that Maja Wampuszyc, playing Corrine, achieves in these moments (she has several) reminds me of some fabulous, skeletal, withered old weeping willow tree, its boughs gone, its charms almost empty, its branches dropping to the ground in naked shame." In the fall of 2017 her role as Corrine in "Lady MacBeth and Her Lover" at The Directors Studio at The Directors Company once more in New York City. a performance about which Daryl Reilly writes in Theater Scene... "With her marvelously fluty voice, imperious bearing, expressive physicality and animated facial features, Maja Wampuszyc as the haughty Corrine recalls Geraldine Page in all her grand glory. Ms. Wampuszyc is mesmerizing, delivering a searing performance of tremendous depth. She vividly conveys the character's dysfunctional sensibility with heightened emotionalism and dry humor"...
