= Eduard Rügemer =

German major known for saving Jews

Eduard David Rügemer
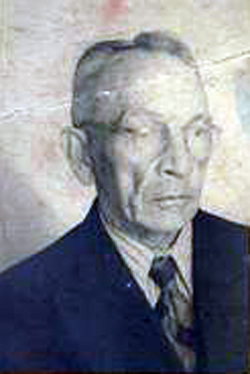
- Rügemer in 1946-1953
- Born: March 27 ,1883; Nuremberg
- Died: 1953; Nuremberg
- Known for: Saving 12 Jews during World War II
- Parents: Friedrich Philipp Christian Rügemer (father); Katharina Born (mother)
- Honours: Righteous Among the Nations by Yad Vashem

Eduard David Rügemer was a German major in the Wehrmacht who was posthumously honored by Yad Vashem as Righteous Among the Nations for rescuing Jews.

== Life ==
Eduard Rügemer was born on March 27 ,1883 in Nuremberg, the son of saddler Friedrich Philipp Christian Rügemer (1852–1927) and his wife Katharina Born (1850–1912), who came from the Palatinate. Following the invasion of the Soviet Union, Rügemer, a major in the Wehrmacht, was deployed to Tarnopol in eastern Galicia in late summer. During the German occupation, the Jews living there were forced into a ghetto and forced to perform labor, including in the major's army motor vehicle depot. He helped his Polish housekeeper, the forced laborer Irene Gut Opdyke, hide twelve Jews threatened with deportation in the cellar of the villa requisitioned for him during the liquidation of the ghetto, and later in a nearby bunker protected by woods. In return, he demanded sexual favors from Irene Gut, to which she agreed in order to protect those in hiding. As a result of her sacrifice to gain this assistance, all those rescued survived. Among those rescued was Roman Haller, who was born in the forest hideout in May 1944.

After the war, Rügemer was rejected by his wife and children in Nuremberg for being party to saving Jews. Later, the Hallers tracked down Rügemer and brought him from Nuremberg to their home in Munich, where he lived until his death in 1953. Rügemer became Zeide ('grandfather') to Roman Haller. Haller went on to serve as director of the German office of the Claims Conference, which represents the victims of the Holocaust in negotiating restitution for the victims of Nazi persecution. According to official records, Rügemer died in Nuremberg.

Posthumously, Rügemer was honored by Yad Vashem in 2012 as Righteous Among the Nations. Rügemer's 90-year-old son Erich Rügemer accepted the medal and certificate on his behalf in Allersberg in early February 2014. Roman Haller was also present during the ceremony.

In the 2023 film Irena's Vow by Louise Archambault, he was portrayed by Dougray Scott.
