= The Immigrant (2013 film) =

2013 film by James Gray

- Theatrical release poster
- Directed by: James Gray
- Written by: Richard Menello; James Gray
- Produced by: James Gray; Anthony Katagas; Greg Shapiro; Christopher Woodrow
- Starring: Marion Cotillard; Joaquin Phoenix; Jeremy Renner
- Cinematography: Darius Khondji
- Edited by: John Axelrad; Kayla Emter
- Music by: Chris Spelman
- Production companies: Worldview Entertainment; Keep Your Head; Kingsgate Films
- Distributed by: The Weinstein Company
- Release dates: May 24, 2013 (Cannes); May 16, 2014 (United States)
- Running time: 117 minutes
- Country: United States
- Languages: English; Polish
- Budget: $16 million
- Box office: $5.9 million

The Immigrant is a 2013 American period drama film directed by James Gray from a screenplay he co-wrote with Richard Menello, starring Marion Cotillard, Joaquin Phoenix, and Jeremy Renner. It follows a young Polish immigrant who arrives in New York City in 1921 looking for a better life after escaping post–World War I Poland. Shot in New York City between January and March 2012, the film struggled to have a theatrical release following Gray's refusal to change the film's ending to meet Harvey Weinstein's demands, who bought U.S. and UK distribution rights to the film three months after shooting had wrapped, and then threatened to release it direct-to-TV if Gray did not accept Weinstein's cut. The film–with Gray's original cut–had its world premiere at the 2013 Cannes Film Festival where it competed for the Palme d'Or, and received a limited theatrical release in the United States by The Weinstein Company on May 16, 2014.

The Immigrant received generally positive reviews from critics. Cotillard's performance was ranked by Time magazine as the fourth Best Movie Performance of 2014, and she won the National Society of Film Critics Award for Best Actress, the New York Film Critics Circle Award for Best Actress, and the Toronto Film Critics Association Award for Best Actress.

== Plot summary ==
In 1921, Polish Catholic sisters Ewa (Marion Cotillard) and Magda (Angela Sarafyan) arrive at Ellis Island, New York City as immigrants looking for a better life after escaping their ravaged home in post–Great War Poland. Magda is quarantined because of her lung disease. Ewa is almost deported, but Bruno (Joaquin Phoenix), who is Jewish and claims to be from the Travelers' Aid Society, notices her and her fluency in English, bribes an officer to let her go, and takes her to his house. Knowing Ewa has to make money to get Magda released, Bruno induces her to dance at the Bandits' Roost theater and prostitutes her. He also makes romantic advances, but Ewa resists.

Ewa looks for her expatriate relatives living in New York, but her uncle by marriage turns her in to the authorities; he says he had heard she had got in trouble for engaging in illicit behavior on the ship from Europe, and he wishes to distance himself from sheltering a prostitute. Policemen take her back to Ellis Island, and once again she is slated for deportation. While at Ellis Island Ewa watches a performance by Emil (Bruno's cousin, making a living as a performing illusionist called Orlando; played by Jeremy Renner); after his performance he hands her a white rose. The next morning Bruno manages to get her released.

Ewa meets Emil again at the Bandit's Roost. Emil asks Ewa to come onstage to aid him in his mind reading trick, but the men in the audience start catcalling at Ewa. The scene ends in a brawl between Bruno and Emil and with Bruno and the girls being fired from the theater. Soon after Bruno has his "doves" parade around Central Park to attract men to sleep with them. Another encounter between Emil and Ewa proves Emil's feelings for her. Emil falls for Ewa, much to Bruno's discontent, which causes continued and intense conflicts between the two men. One violent conflict concludes with Bruno being jailed overnight.

One day, Emil sneaks into Bruno's home to see Ewa. While there, he promises to get her the money to save her sister so they can all leave New York together. Coincidentally, shortly after making such promise, Emil hides as Bruno returns. Bruno also makes a promise to Ewa: he is to arrange for her a meeting with her sister. But Emil interrupts Bruno, as he pulls out an unloaded gun and points it at Bruno. Emil pulls the trigger just to frighten him, but his attempt at intimidating Bruno backfires, as Bruno stabs him to death in apparent self-defense.

Overcoming the shock and distress of the death, Bruno and Ewa dump Emil's body in the street at night to get rid of unwanted police investigations, but the police are told by another prostitute with whom Ewa had had conflicts that Ewa killed Emil. Bruno hides Ewa from the police, who then give him a severe beating and steal a large bundle of money he had been carrying. Ewa learns Bruno had enough money to pay for her sister's release all along but was hiding it from her as he did not want her to leave him. Bruno claims he has now had a change of heart and would help Ewa and her sister if he had any money. Ewa makes another contact with her aunt and successfully pleads for her aunt to give her the money for Magda. With it, Bruno pays his contact on Ellis Island to release Ewa's sister and gives them both tickets to California. Ewa and Magda leave, while a repentant Bruno stays in New York, intending to confess to the police about Emil's killing.

== Cast ==
- Marion Cotillard as Ewa Cybulska
- Joaquin Phoenix as Bruno Weiss
- Jeremy Renner as Orlando The Magician / Emil
- Dagmara Dominczyk as Belva
- Yelena Solovey as Rosie Hertz
- Maja Wampuszyc as Edyta Bistricky, Ewa's and Magda's aunt
- Ilia Volok as Wojtek Bistricky
- Angela Sarafyan as Magda Cybulska
- Antoni Corone as Customs Officer Thomas MacNally
- Peter McRobbie as Dr. Knox
- Sofia Black-D'Elia as Not Magda
- Joseph Calleja as Enrico Caruso

== Production ==
=== Development ===
On May 31, 2011, Deadline reported that James Gray would direct the film, then-titled Low Life, about a woman attempting to emigrate from Poland to New York, starring Marion Cotillard and Joaquin Phoenix, and that Jeremy Renner was in talks to play the third lead. The working titles for the film were Low Life, American Dream, and The Nightingale, before changing for the last time to The Immigrant shortly before the film's premiere at the 2013 Cannes Film Festival.

Gray said that The Immigrant is "80% based on the recollections from my grandparents, who came to the United States in 1923", and he described it as "my most personal and autobiographical film to date". Gray co-wrote the screenplay with Richard Menello, it was one of his last screenplays before his death in March 2013, shortly before the film's Cannes premiere.

The Immigrant was Gray's first film with a female protagonist. Gray wrote the film for Cotillard and Phoenix. He stated that if they did not want to do the film, he was not sure he would have made it. Gray had previously worked with Phoenix in The Yards (2000), We Own the Night (2007), and Two Lovers (2008).

In 2010, Gray collaborated with Cotillard's then-partner, Guillaume Canet, on the screenplay for Blood Ties (2013), Canet's first film in English that Gray helped translate the dialogue. Gray met Cotillard by chance without knowing that she was Canet's partner, during a dinner at a restaurant in Paris to discuss Blood Ties. Gray and Cotillard then got into an argument about an actor that Cotillard loved and Gray found overrated, so Cotillard threw a piece of bread at Gray's head, and when she said she thought Gray was a "jerk", he immediately liked her as a result. Gray did not know who Cotillard was, as he had small children at the time and did not go to the movies, it was his wife who later told him that Cotillard was an actress and had won an Oscar, but he thought Cotillard looked like Pola Negri, the Polish actress of silent films, so he wrote the film for her, without ever seeing her on screen, knowing that her face was exactly the one he was looking for. Gray said he later watched all of Cotillard's films that he could find, and then he knew he had to write something for her.

When Gray was trying to think of a movie for Cotillard, he was talking to his brother, who found journals from their grandfather who ran a saloon on the Lower East Side in New York in the 1920s, after he came from Kiev, and there were all these "low lives" frequenting the place. One of them was described by Gray as "a enigmatic, screwed-up, manipulative pimp who used to go to Ellis Island and cruise for women who came to the country by themselves." According to Gray, in the 1920s women trying to get into the U.S. by themselves were not let in specifically because they were targets for prostitution, but through bribery, canny pimps would get around these rules. And so a movie idea was born. Gray said that he had never seen a movie on that subject. "Lower East Side, Ellis Island, pimps; it seemed very vivid to me. So I said, 'that sounds perfect,'" he told. However, getting Cotillard on board wasn't as easy as he'd hoped. Gray sent the screenplay to Cotillard, but then had to wait seven days for an answer after she had promised to read the script over a weekend. "Well, Sunday came and went and it was like getting a colonoscopy over a week," he said of the agonizing wait for an answer.

Gray wrote around 20 pages of dialogue in Polish. Cotillard had to learn Polish to take on the role and speak English with a credible Polish accent. She had only two months to learn her Polish dialogue. After directing Cotillard in The Immigrant, Gray stated that she is the best actor he has ever worked with.

=== Influences ===
Gray said that the films that influenced The Immigrant were La Strada (1954), Diary of a Country Priest (1951), Seven Beauties (1975), Nights of Cabiria (1957), and America America (1963). The film's sepia-toned cinematography was inspired by old autochrome photographs, the works of cinematographers Vilmos Zsigmond and Gordon Willis, and films such as McCabe & Mrs. Miller (1971) and Heaven's Gate (1980). He was also inspired by Giacomo Puccini's operas that comprise Il Trittico.

When Gray met Cotillard, she reminded him of a silent film actress because she had a "haunted quality" of Renée Jeanne Falconetti in Carl Theodor Dreyer's film The Passion of Joan of Arc (1928). Cotillard's character and the way she was filmed in The Immigrant were based on silent film stars such as Falconetti in The Passion of Joan of Arc (1928), and also Lillian Gish, and Louise Brooks. Gray said he wanted "a kind of Falconetti conception, where the face would have such meaning and would tell you so much." The character was also partly inspired by Italian actress Giulietta Masina.

=== Filming ===
Principal photography on the film began on January 27, 2012 in New York City, under the working title "Low Life". Filming was completed on March 17, 2012.

The Immigrant was the first film shot at Ellis Island. Shooting on location was only made possible after cinematographer Darius Khondji suggested they shoot the day scenes at night. The National Park Service reluctantly agreed to let them shoot there for two days, starting at 5:30 pm when the last ferry goes from Ellis Island until sunrise.

Gray told Salon.com in a May 2014 interview that Phoenix loved Cotillard and would often apologize to her after filming the scenes where his character mistreated her character. There was one scene where Phoenix felt so bad that he hid himself in his dressing room for hours and could not come down. Phoenix kept saying to Cotillard: "I'm so sorry, this is not me, it's not me." Gray said that Phoenix was extremely uncomfortable playing that role, although he was great and "maybe as good as he's ever been", but he was miserable on set.

Gray said that during filming, Cotillard constantly offered to remove the text, assuring him that she could express everything with her face. Gray was skeptical and thought it seemed impossible, but each time she proved the opposite. "She managed to get incredible things to pass just with her face," Gray said.

== Post-production controversy ==
In June 2012, The Weinstein Company acquired U.S. distribution rights to the film, three months after filming had wrapped. The film was completed in time for the 2012 Toronto Film Festival, but The Weinstein Company insisted on holding it until Cannes 2013, with Harvey Weinstein hoping he might convince director James Gray to change the ending and give it a Sound of Music (1965)-style ending. Gray refused to change the ending and the film was only released in the U.S. in 2014.

In a 2015 interview with Hammer To Nail, Gray said that if he had made the changes that Weinstein suggested, the film would have been a disaster financially and critically, and it would not have been his film; adding that he learned his lesson after The Yards (2000), in which the version released in theaters was not the ending that he wanted and the film was criticized for that. Weinstein denied rumors of editing-room tensions in a 2014 interview with Variety and praised The Immigrant, calling it "everyone's story — my story, my grandparents' story. This is our country", and compared it to Elia Kazan's film America America (1963). In a January 2015 interview with IndieWire's Ryan Lattanzio, Cotillard was asked why The Weinstein Company had failed to support the film, to which she answered; "There a lot of things that I cannot really talk about". Lattanzio then stated that the film should have been an Oscar contender, to which Cotillard replied; "Well, you need money to do that, and we won't have this money!".

Gray stated in a March 2017 interview with The Telegraph that Weinstein bought the film without his approval from the equity people who raised the money for him in the United States. Gray did not want Weinstein to buy The Immigrant and told the equity people that selling him the film was a terrible idea, but he had no say over the matter. Gray said that when the film was released in the U.S., Cotillard won virtually every critical award without any support at all, and that Weinstein "could have easily gotten her an Oscar nomination, maybe even won her an Oscar, if he'd put his machine behind her." However, the film did not receive any Oscar nomination.

In a March 2022 interview with Le Monde, Cotillard said that Weinstein did not respect Gray much less his film, and that he wanted to prevent The Immigrant from premiering at the Cannes Film Festival and release it direct-to-TV without a theatrical run. Cotillard said she wrote Weinstein telling him that even if he despised Gray, that he should at least respect the people who admire the director. Cotillard added that even if Weinstein went beyond the limits of his power, he should at least not damage the film.

In a November 2022 interview with Vulture, Gray said that Weinstein threatened to release the film on the TV channel Lifetime over his refusal to change the ending, which Gray felt was very important, but Weinstein hated the last shot. On the morning that Weinstein's daughter was born, he called Gray telling him that he was in the editing room working on The Immigrant, and Gray replied that he did not ask him to do that and then they started arguing, with Gray telling Weinstein that he was trying to be a frustrated director, to which Weinstein replied: "Fuck you! I'm Harvey Weinstein! I'm God's editor!", according to Gray. Gray stated that Weinstein's cut had a runtime of 88 minutes, was "completely incoherent", had a voice-over all over it and that Weinstein wanted the ending to be a combination of Titanic (1997) and Sound of Music (1965), with soaring music playing to Cotillard's character in old-age makeup walking over a mountain with her sister, as if she was saying: "When I was younger, this is what my life was, but now my sister and I are living great."

== Release ==
=== Theatrical ===
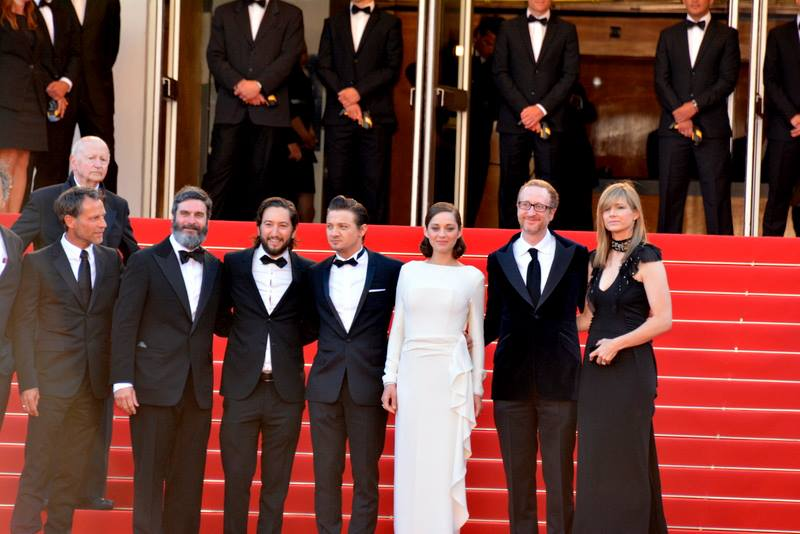
Cast and director at the 2013 Cannes Film Festival.

The Immigrant had its world premiere at the 2013 Cannes Film Festival on May 24, 2023, where it competed for the Palme d'Or. It also screened at the 2013 Rio de Janeiro International Film Festival, the 2013 New York Film Festival, the 2013 Chicago International Film Festival, the 2014 Miami International Film Festival, the 2014 Newport Beach International Film Festival, and the 2014 Sedona Film Festival.

In September 2013, it was announced that The Immigrant would be released in the United States on video on demand (VOD) in early 2014 by Radius-TWC (The Weinstein Company's VOD branch). However, the film was finally released theatrically in the U.S. by The Weinstein Company on May 16, 2014. Gray credited the audience's positive response to the film as the reason it got a theatrical release in the U.S. instead of a VOD release. By the time of its U.S. release, the film had already been released theatrically in countries such as France and Belgium in 2013, and had already been released on DVD in France.

=== Streaming ===
On July 14, 2014, the film was made available for streaming in the U.S. via Netflix, eleven days after the end of its theatrical run on July 3, 2014.

Weinstein also bought the UK distribution rights to the film, but it was never released theatrically in the region. It was only released in the UK via streaming on BFI Player in March 2019.

=== Home media ===
The film was released on DVD and Blu-Ray in the U.S. by The Weinstein Company and Anchor Bay Entertainment on April 7, 2015. Extras include a feature commentary by Gray and the visual inspiration for The Immigrant.

== Reception ==
=== Critical response ===
The Immigrant received generally positive reviews from critics, especially for Marion Cotillard's performance, despite divisive early reactions for the film itself following its premiere at the 2013 Cannes Film Festival. Rotten Tomatoes gives the film a score of 86% based on 111 reviews, with an average score of 7.45/10; the general consensus states: "Beautiful visuals, James Gray's confident direction, and a powerful performance from Marion Cotillard combine to make The Immigrant a richly rewarding period drama." Metacritic gave the film a rating of 77/100, based on 34 reviews.

Peter Debruge of Variety wrote that "Gray clearly sees something in Cotillard that no other helmer — not even her husband, Guillaume Canet — has brought out in her before. Recognizing the deep, haunted quality of Cotillard's gaze, he features her eyes as the soul of his story, counting on their mournful quality to play to the back of the house, even as he resists unnecessary closeups in favor of broad-canvas widescreen as much as possible."

Michael Phillips of Chicago Tribune described the film as "Gray's most satisfying to date, an ode to melodrama of another day, done with style and surprising restraint." Ignatiy Vishnevetsky of The A.V. Club lauded it as an "American masterpiece," claiming: "Gray is the most underappreciated of this country's major filmmakers; his movies distill a century's worth of American feature film—a little late silent cinema here, a little New Hollywood there—into a distinctly personal style. ... What makes The Immigrant a great film is the way in which Gray uses actors and his mastery of the unspoken to create a tremendously lived-in, felt-through world. Every space—public or private, interior or exterior—feels authentic, historically and emotionally." Ed Gonzalez of Slant Magazine gave the film 3 and a half out of 4 stars, saying that "The Immigrant feels closer in spirit to Roberto Rossellini's collaborations with Ingrid Bergman" and calling it "Gray's Voyage to Italy".

Brian Clark of Twitch Film gave the film a mixed review, commenting that "while the film boasts great performances, the narrative and overall drama lacks the ferocity, momentum and intensity of Gray's other work". Lee Marshall of Screen International in his unfavorable review wrote that "though Gray offers a well-crafted package, especially on the visual front, there's surprisingly little contemporary resonance in this immigration melodrama".

=== Box office ===
The Immigrant was released in France on November 27, 2013 in 242 theaters, ranking at number five at the box office and grossing $1,041,038 in its first weekend. For its second weekend in French theaters, the film was expanded to 265 theaters. It grossed a total of $2,253,023 in France at the end of its theatrical run.

The film, which had no promotion by Weinstein, had a limited theatrical release in the United States in 3 theaters in its first weekend on May 16, 2014, and was later expanded to 144 theaters in its second weekend, having its maximum theatrical release in 150 theaters in its third weekend. Although the film was doing well in arthouses, it never had a wide release and finished its theatrical run after seven weeks playing in 61 theaters on July 3, 2014, grossing a total of $2,025,328 in the United States and $3,927,556 in other territories. The Immigrant grossed a total of $5.9 million worldwide.

=== Accolades ===
Time magazine ranked Marion Cotillard's performance in The Immigrant as the fourth Best Movie Performance of 2014, shared with her performance in the Belgian film Two Days, One Night.

Year	Award	Category	Recipient(s)	Result	Ref(s)
2013	Cannes Film Festival	Palme d'Or	James Gray	Nominated	
2013	Munich Film Festival	ARRI/OSRAM Award – Best International Film	James Gray	Nominated	
2013	Ghent International Film Festival	Grand Prix	James Gray	Nominated	
2013	Chicago International Film Festival	Audience Choice Award	James Gray	Nominated	
2014	Newport Beach Film Festival	Outstanding Achievement in Directing	James Gray	Won	
2014	Newport Beach Film Festival	Outstanding Achievement in Filmmaking – Ensemble Cast	Marion Cotillard, Joaquin Phoenix and Jeremy Renner	Won	
2014	National Society of Film Critics Awards	Best Actress	Marion Cotillard (shared with her performance in Two Days, One Night)	Won	
2014	New York Film Critics Circle Awards	Best Actress	Marion Cotillard (shared with her performance in Two Days, One Night)	Won	
2014	New York Film Critics Circle Awards	Best Cinematographer	Darius Khondji	Won	
2014	Boston Society of Film Critics Award	Best Actress	Marion Cotillard (shared with Two Days, One Night)	Won	
2014	Toronto Film Critics Association	Best Actress	Marion Cotillard	Won	
2015	Film Comment	Top 20 Best Films of 2014	James Gray	10th place	
2015	American Society of Cinematographers Awards	Spotlight Award	Darius Khondji	Nominated	
2015	Independent Spirit Awards	Best Female Lead	Marion Cotillard	Nominated	
2015	Independent Spirit Awards	Best Cinematography	Darius Khondji	Nominated	
