= Irena's Vow (film) =

2023 Canadian-Polish drama film

- Official poster
- Directed by: Louise Archambault
- Written by: Dan Gordon
- Based on: Irena's Vow by Dan Gordon
- Produced by: Beata Pisula; Tim Ringuette; Nicholas Tabarrok; Jeff Sackman; Berry Meyerowitz
- Starring: Sophie Nélisse; Dougray Scott
- Cinematography: Paul Sarossy
- Edited by: Arthur Tarnowski
- Music by: Alexandra Stréliski
- Production companies: Darius Films; Entract Studios; K&K Selekt
- Distributed by: Elevation Pictures
- Release dates: September 10, 2023 (TIFF); April 19, 2024
- Running time: 121 minutes
- Countries: Canada; Poland
- Language: English
- Box office: $1.2 million

Irena's Vow is a 2023 war drama film, directed by Louise Archambault. Written by Dan Gordon who also wrote the Broadway play Irena's Vow, the film stars Sophie Nélisse as Irena Gut Opdyke, a Polish nurse who helped to shelter and protect Jewish people during the Holocaust by hiding them in the cellar of the home where she was employed as a housekeeper by German Army officer Major Eduard Rügemer (Dougray Scott). The cast also includes Andrzej Seweryn, Eliza Rycembel, Maciej Nawrocki, Aleksandar Milicevic, Tomasz Tyndyk and Nela Maciejewska.

The film was shot in 2022 in Warsaw and Lublin, Poland. It premiered in the Centrepiece program at the 2023 Toronto International Film Festival in September. The film was released in Canada on April 19, 2024.

== Cast ==
- Sophie Nélisse as Irena Gut Opdyke
- Dougray Scott as Major Eduard Rügemer
- Andrzej Seweryn as Herr Schultz
- Maciej Nawrocki as Sturmbannführer Wilhelm Rokita (in reality Richard Rokita)
- Sharon Azrieli as Helen Weinbaum
- Aleksandar Milićević as Lazar Haller
- Eliza Rycembel as Ida Haller
- Agata Turkot as Clara Bauer
- Filip Kosior as Thomas Bauer
- Krzysztof Szczepaniak as Moise Steiner
- nnnn Irena Melcer as Zosia
- Eryk Kulm as Abram Klinger
- Zuzanna Pulawska as Fanka Silberman
- Tomasz Tyndyk as Henry Weinbaum
- Rafał Maćkowiak as Joseph Weiss
- Mateusz Mosiewicz as Marian Wilner

== Reception ==
=== Critical response ===
On the review aggregator website Rotten Tomatoes, 84% of 32 critics' reviews are positive, with an average rating of 7.2/10. Metacritic, which uses a weighted average, assigned the film a score of 77 out of 100, based on 4 critics, indicating "generally favorable" reviews.

Christy Lemire of RogerEbert.com gave the film three out of four stars and wrote, "Sophie Nélisse brings powerful subtlety to the title role in Irena's Vow, accomplishing so much with her eyes, her presence, her ability to shift demeanor and tone quickly depending on the situation."

=== Awards and nominations ===
2023 Winner: Audience Award,
Vancouver International Film Festival

2023 Winner: LIUNA People's Choice Award,
Windsor International Film Festival

2023 Nominee: WIFF Prize in Canadian Film,
Windsor International Film Festival
