= Sophie Nélisse =

Canadian actress (born 2000)

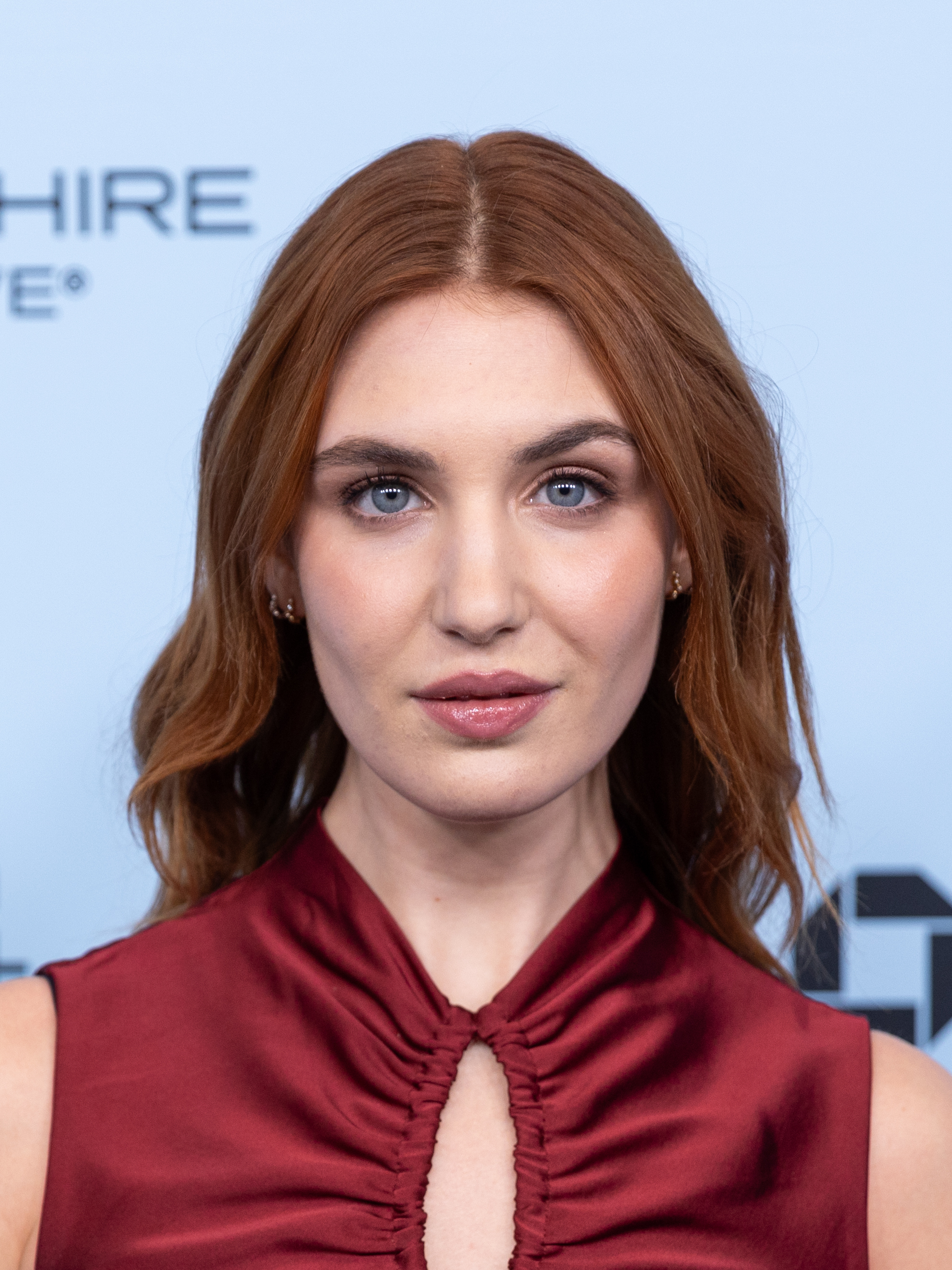
- Nélisse in 2025
- Born: Marie-Sophie Nélisse; March 27, 2000 (age 26); Windsor, Ontario, Canada
- Occupation: Actress
- Years active: 2011–present
- Relatives: Isabelle Nélisse (sister)

Marie-Sophie Nélisse (born March 27, 2000) is a Canadian actress. She made her film debut in the French-language drama Monsieur Lazhar (2011), for which she won a Genie Award for Best Supporting Actress. She played Liesel Meminger in the 2013 war drama The Book Thief, young Joan Fischer in the biographical film Pawn Sacrifice (2014), Casey Caraway in the coming-of-age drama Mean Dreams (2016), Aster in The Rest of Us (2019), and Irena Gut in Irena's Vow (2023). Since 2021, she has starred as Shauna Shipman in the Showtime psychological thriller series Yellowjackets. She also portrays Rose Landry in the Canadian sports romance series Heated Rivalry (2025–present).

== Early life ==
Marie-Sophie Nélisse was born in Windsor, Ontario, on March 27, 2000. She is French Canadian. Her family moved to Montreal when she was four. Her mother left her job as a schoolteacher in 2013 to act as a talent manager for both Sophie and her younger sister Isabelle, who is also an actress. Nélisse is fluent in French and English.

== Career ==
Nélisse spent her early years training in gymnastics and signed to a talent agency to make money to pay for the training, but after getting the part of Liesel Meminger in The Book Thief (and subsequent accolades) she shifted her focus to acting.

Besides her Genie Award for Monsieur Lazhar, she won a Jutra Award for her performance and a Young Artist Award nomination as Best Leading Young Actress in an International Feature Film. She held a recurring role in the Québec sitcom The Parent Family and she also starred in the title role of the 2015 film The Great Gilly Hopkins. In May 2016, Nélisse was present on the red carpet at Cannes Film Festival for the first time to present Canadian thriller movie Mean Dreams.

In 2016, Nélisse was one of four actors selected by the Toronto International Film Festival, alongside Grace Glowicki, Jared Abrahamson, and Mylène Mackay for its "Rising Stars" programme, described as an "intensive professional development programme [that] immerses participants in a series of public events and industry meetings during the Festival."

After graduating high school in June 2017, Nélisse confirmed she wouldn't be enrolling in post-secondary education due to commitments shooting Close in London and Morocco.

In June 2018, it was announced that she would be the face of Caroline Néron's Fall 2018 jewelry line. In a L'actualité series about "Being 18 years old in 2018", Nélisse spoke about entering adulthood in the era of the Weinstein effect, and deplored that when she announced she was looking for "more mature roles", she was quickly offered multiple roles where her characters would be raped and that scenarios she receives almost always include sexual elements. One of these instances was when she turned down the sexually charged lead role in Fugueuse, in which Ludivine Reding was eventually cast as Fanny, the titular teenage runaway who ends up a sex trafficking victim.

In November 2019, it was announced that she was cast as Shauna Shipman in the Showtime psychological thriller series Yellowjackets. The series debuted on Showtime on November 14, 2021. The second season premiered on March 26, 2023, and the third season premiered on February 14, 2025.

In 2023, she starred as Irena Gut, a Polish nurse who helped to shelter and protect Jewish people during the Holocaust by hiding them in the cellar of the home where she was employed as a housekeeper by German Army officer, in Irena's Vow. It premiered in the Centrepiece program at the 2023 Toronto International Film Festival in September.

On April 18, 2025, the author of the book Girl in Pieces, Kathleen Glasgow, confirmed that Courtney Eaton and Sophie Nélisse bought the film rights to the book. Nelisse portrays Rose Landry in the Canadian sports romance television series Heated Rivalry (2025–present).

== Filmography ==
=== Film ===
Year	Title	Role	Notes
2011	Monsieur Lazhar	Alice L'Écuyer	
2012	Ésimésac	Marie Gélinas	
2013	The Book Thief	Liesel Meminger	
2014	Pawn Sacrifice	Joan Fischer	
2015	Endorphine	Simone de Koninck	
2015	The Great Gilly Hopkins	Gilly Hopkins	
2016	Mean Dreams	Casey Caraway	
2016	1:54	Jennifer	
2016	Wait Till Helen Comes	Molly	
2016	The History of Love	Alma Singer	
2017	Worst Case, We Get Married	Aïcha Saint-Pierre	
2019	Close	Zoe Tanner	
2019	47 Meters Down: Uncaged	Mia	
2019	The Rest of Us	Aster	
2020	Flashwood	Rose	
2020	The Kid Detective	Caroline	
2023	Irena's Vow	Irena Gut	
2025	Two Women	Jessica	
2025	Elli and Her Monster Team	Elli (voice)	English dub
2025	Whistle	Ellie Gains	
2026	Lydia and the Mist Rider	Lydia (voice)	
TBA	Stranger in Town	Ruth	Post-production

=== Television ===
Year	Title	Role	Notes
2010	Mirador	Jeune fille de Ralf	Episode: "Vulnérabilités"
2010	Toute la Vérité	Marie-Anne	3 episodes
2011–2016	The Parent Family	Zoé Larivière-Beaudoin	36 episodes
2012	Vertige	Rosalie Roussel	6 episodes
2018	Demain des hommes	Roxanne Rousseau	4 episodes
2019–2020	L'Échappée	Romy Lalonde	—N/a
2020	Amours d'occasion	Florence	Episode: "Avenue Greene – Rue Notre-Dame Ouest"
2021–present	Yellowjackets	Shauna Shipman	29 episodes
2022	Transplant	Hannah Miller	Episode: "Jasmine"
2023	Aller Simple	Fanny Lori	6 episodes
2025	L'Indétectable	Stéphanie Parent Sirois	6 episodes
2025–present	Heated Rivalry	Rose Landry	3 episodes
2026	Alice	Catherine Calvert	2 episodes
TBA	This Summer Will Be Different	Lucy Ashby	10 episodes

== Awards and nominations ==
Year	Award	Category	Work	Result	Ref.
2012	Genie Awards	Best Supporting Actress	Monsieur Lazhar	Won	
2012	Jutra Awards	Best Supporting Actress	Monsieur Lazhar	Won	
2013	Young Artist Awards	Best Performance in an International Feature Film – Young Actress	Monsieur Lazhar	Nominated	
2013	Hollywood Film Awards	Spotlight Award	The Book Thief	Won (Note: Shared with David Oyelowo for The Butler and Michael B. Jordan for Fruitvale Station)	
2013	Phoenix Film Critics Society Awards	Best Performance by a Youth – Female	The Book Thief	Won	
2014	Critics' Choice Awards	Best Young Actor/Actress	The Book Thief	Nominated	
2014	Satellite Awards	Breakthrough Performance Award	The Book Thief	Won (Note: Shared with Michael B. Jordan for Fruitvale Station)	
2014	Young Artist Awards	Best Performance in a Feature Film – Leading Young Actress	The Book Thief	Won (Note: Shared with Loreta Peralta for Instructions Not Included)	
2014	Saturn Awards	Best Performance by a Younger Actor	The Book Thief	Nominated	
2026	Canadian Screen Awards	Best Supporting Performance in a Drama Program or Series	Heated Rivalry	Won	
2026	Canadian Screen Awards	Radius Award	Herself	Won	
2026	ACTRA Awards in Montreal	Outstanding Performance in Television Series	Heated Rivalry	Nominated	
