= Mean Dreams =

- Directed by: Nathan Morlando
- Written by: Kevin Coughlin; Ryan Grassby
- Produced by: William Woods; Allison Black
- Starring: Sophie Nélisse; Josh Wiggins; Bill Paxton; Colm Feore
- Cinematography: Steve Cosens
- Edited by: Ronald Sanders; Sandy Pereira
- Music by: Son Lux
- Production company: Woods Entertainment
- Distributed by: Elevation Pictures
- Release date: 15 May 2016 (Cannes)
- Running time: 105 minutes
- Country: Canada
- Language: English

Mean Dreams is a 2016 Canadian coming-of-age thriller film directed by Nathan Morlando and written by Kevin Coughlin and Ryan Grassby. The film stars Sophie Nélisse, Josh Wiggins, and Bill Paxton. It was screened in the Directors' Fortnight section at the 2016 Cannes Film Festival. It was Paxton's final release film during his lifetime.

== Plot ==
Described as "a coming-of-age drama that evolves into a crime thriller", the film begins with teenagers Jonas and Casey meeting, introduced by Casey's faithful dog Blaze. Jonas spends his days working on his father's cattle ranch in the Great Lakes region of North America; Casey and her father Wayne, a police sergeant, are the new neighbors. Wayne tries to quell the romance blossoming between Casey and Jonas. When Jonas sees Wayne hit Casey, Jonas and Wayne get into fight and Wayne threatens Jonas's life. Jonas talks to the Chief and his father about protecting Casey without receiving any help. He decides to act on his own.

Jonas goes to Casey's with a plan to run away together. Wayne comes out to his truck in the middle of the night and Jonas hides under the tarp in the back. Police sergeant Wayne drives to a drug deal where he kills the bikers and takes a million dollars. Jonas sees and hears it all later escaping and taking the money from Wayne at a gasoline stop. He and Casey go on the lam, living outdoors and trying to stay one step ahead of Wayne and the authorities. Casey tells Jonas how her father used to beat up her mother before her death in a car crash and now she takes the beatings. She is sure her father will kill Jonas.

The Chief of Police was in on the deal and he finds the teens at a motel after the pawn shop reported Jonas's gun purchase. He drives Jonas to a dump and demands the return of the money. Jonas tells him someone stole the money. Despite being cut in the gut, Jonas gets the gun and control driving away in the Chief's vehicle. Casey treats Jonas's wound and gives away her dog Blaze who has slowed their getaway. They get on a bus heading West to fulfill Casey's dream to see the ocean.

The bus is pulled over by the Chief and Wayne after the dog's microchip disclosed their location. The Chief drugs Wayne and the two teens and takes all the money. The three awake and Wayne wants the part of the money the kids had previously buried. If he gets the money, Jonas can walk away free. As the daughter digs for the money, she recovers the pistol Jonas bought, and with some hesitation, turns and shoots her father dead, avenging her mother. The teens are seen hitching a ride in the back of a truck with that half of the drug money, and also stashing the pistol.

== Cast ==
- Sophie Nélisse as Casey Caraway
- Josh Wiggins as Jonas Ford
- Bill Paxton as Wayne Caraway
- Colm Feore as The Chief
- Blaze as Himself

== Production ==
Although it was announced that Kevin Durand had been cast in the film and shot at least one scene, he does not appear in the final cut.

Principal photography on the film began on October 29, 2015 in Northern Ontario, including Sault Ste. Marie. William Woods would be producing the film through Woods Entertainment, while it would be financed by Tip Top Productions, Project AMB, Vigilante Productions, Telefilm Canada, Northern Ontario Heritage Fund, and Ontario Media Development Corporation.

== Release ==
Following its world premiere at the Directors' Fortnight in Cannes, Mean Dreams played major Canadian film festivals. Elevation Pictures released the film in anglophone-Canadian theatres on 21 October 2016.

Distribution rights for France were acquired by LaBelle Company. Vertical Entertainment bought United States distribution rights, and intended to release the film there in January 2017.

On December 7, 2016, the film was named to the Toronto International Film Festival's annual Canada's Top 10 list.
