= Irena's Vow =

Play written by Dan Gordon

Irena's Vow is a Broadway play recounting the story of Irena Gut, a Polish nurse who, at the risk of her life, saved twelve Jews during World War II in German-occupied Poland. Based on the book In My Hands by Irene Gut Opdyke published in 1999.

== Production history ==
The play opened at Broadway's Walter Kerr Theatre at 219 West 48th Street (between Broadway and 8th Avenue) on 29 March 2009, after having premiered off-Broadway at the Baruch Performing Arts Center in September 2008. The ninety-minute play opened at the Kerr Theatre with the same cast from off-Broadway.

The play was written by Dan Gordon, based on conversations that he had held with Irene Gut-Opdyke (née Irena Gut). Gordon "captures... peculiarly Polish elements: the heroine's irony and sense of humor in the face of catastrophe." He deftly draws the historic backdrop to Irena's story and creates a suspenseful narrative and "enthralling dialog."

The title role is played by Tovah Feldshuh. Appearing in other roles are Sandi Carroll, Tracee Chimo, Steven Hauck, Scott Klaven, Peter Reznikoff, Thomas Ryan, Gene Silvers, John Stanisci and Maja Wampuszyc.

Irena's Vow is directed by Michael Parva. Scenic design is by Kevin Judge; lighting design, David Castaneda; costume design, Astrid Brucker; sound design and music composition, Quentin Chiappetta; and projection design, Alex Koch.

On June 16, 2009 it was announced that Irena's Vow would close on June 28. At the time of its closure, it had played 21 previews and 105 regular performances.

Irena's Vow, a film adaptation written by Gordon and directed by Louise Archambault, went into production in 2022 in Lublin and premiered at the 2023 Toronto International Film Festival.

== Story ==
After Poland was invaded by Germany and the Soviet Union in September 1939, Irena Gut, a 19 year old Polish Catholic nurse at the outbreak of World War II, was captured by the Soviet Army. After escaping, she was caught in a German roundup to be used as a slave laborer.

Eventually she became the housekeeper to a German army major. After she witnessed the gruesome fate of Jews in German-occupied Poland, Gut resolved at the risk of her life to conceal a dozen Jews threatened by the German Holocaust extermination program. The penalty that the Germans imposed on any Pole found to be harboring or otherwise aiding Jews was death.

One day Gut's employer discovered that she was concealing Jews in his house. Gut begged him to spare them; he agreed to, and never betrayed them or her. Gut became the German officer's mistress. Before the Red Army arrived, she fled with the people that she was protecting into the forest. After the war, suspected falsely by some of having collaborated with the Germans, she emigrated to the United States.

== See also ==
- List of individuals and groups assisting Jews during the Holocaust
- Rescue of Jews by Poles during the Holocaust
