= Irene Gut Opdyke =

Polish nurse who aided Jews during WWII (1918–2003)

- Front cover of In My Hands. Memories of a Holocaust Rescuer by Opdyke, ISBN 0385720327
- Born: Irena Gut; 5 May 1918; Kozienice, Kingdom of Poland
- Died: 17 May 2003 (aged 85); Fullerton, California, U.S.
- Citizenship: Poland; United States
- Occupation: Nurse
- Spouse: William Opdyke (m. 1956; died 1993)
- Children: 1
- Honours: Righteous Among the Nations

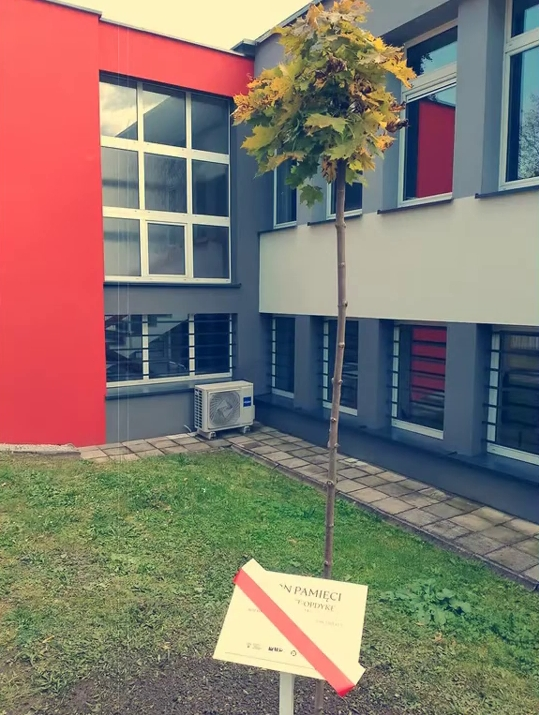
Maple tree in memory of Irena Gut Opdyke, Righteous Among the Nations, in Piekary Śląskie, in Poland.

Irene Gut Opdyke (born Irena Gut, 5 May 1918 – 17 May 2003) was a Polish nurse who gained international recognition for aiding Polish Jews persecuted by Nazi Germany during World War II. She was honored as a Righteous Among the Nations by Yad Vashem in Jerusalem for risking her life to save 12 Jews.

== Life ==
Irena Gut was born into a Catholic family, in Kozienice, Poland, five months ahead of the formation of the Second Polish Republic; she was one of five daughters. The Gut family moved during her childhood, first to Chełm before settling Kozłowa Góra, where her father opened a factory which produced glass and ceramics.

As a teenager Gut joined her school dance group which would perform in the area. Gut's mother was involved in charity and Gut eventually became a volunteer at the local Red Cross. Among the volunteers duties involved visiting the local hospital with flowers and gifts for the patients. Observing the care given to the patients by the attending nuns, Gut determined that she wanted to become a nun , combining her strong faith and caring for others. After a talk with her father, who suggested she become a nurse instead, Gut enrolled at St. Mary nursing school at Radom before the Nazi-Soviet invasion of 1939.

While she was hiding during the invasion, Russian soldiers discovered her and she was beaten and raped. Originally forced to work in a munitions factory during the German occupation, Gut was hired by Wehrmacht Major Eduard Rügemer to work in a kitchen of a hotel that frequently served Nazi officials when he learned she was fluent in German. It was during this period that Gut witnessed a German soldier, in the ghetto near the hotel, rip an infant from its mother's arms and throw the baby head-first onto the ground, presumably killing the child. Horrified, she initially wanted to leave her faith but she came to a realization that people have a choice between doing good or evil and determined that she would help the Jews when the opportunity arose. Knowing she risked her life, Gut secretly took food from the hotel and delivered it to the Tarnopol Ghetto.

Gut smuggled Jews out of the ghetto into the surrounding forest and delivered food for them there. Meanwhile, Rügemer asked Gut to work as a housekeeper in his requisitioned villa. She hid 12 Jews in the cellar. They would come out and help her clean the house when he was not around. Rügemer found out about the Jews she was hiding. At risk to all their lives, Rügemer kept Gut's secret, on the condition that she become his mistress. Rügemer fled with the Germans in 1944 ahead of the Russian advance. Gut and several Jews fled west from Soviet occupied Poland to Allied-occupied Germany. She was put in a Displaced Persons camp, where she met William Opdyke, a United Nations worker from New York City. She emigrated to the United States and married Opdyke shortly thereafter in 1956. They had a daughter together. Opdyke died in 1993. Gut died in 2003 after complications from hepatitis.

== Recognition ==
After years of silence regarding her wartime experience, in 1975 Opdyke was convinced to speak after hearing a neo-Nazi claim that the Holocaust never occurred. Opdyke began a public speaking career which culminated in her memoir In My Hands: Memories of a Holocaust Rescuer. In 1982, she was recognized and honored by Yad Vashem as one of the Polish Righteous Among the Nations. In 2012, Irene Gut Opdyke was recognized and honored by Yad Vashem as one of the German Righteous Among the Nations.

=== Synagogue service and papal blessing ===
On 9 June 1995, Opdyke was honored with a papal blessing from Pope John Paul II at a joint service of Jews and Catholics held at Shir Ha-Ma'alot synagogue in Irvine, California, along with an invitation from Pope John Paul II for her to have an audience with him. The papal blessing and audience with the Pope had been obtained for her by congregant Alan Boinus with the help of Monsignor Joseph Karp of the John Paul II Polish Center Catholic church in Yorba Linda, California. The papal blessing was the first recognition by the Catholic Church of her efforts during the Holocaust. Opdyke said, "This is the greatest gift I can receive for whatever I did in my life."

=== ABC Primetime Live trip to Israel ===
In July 1997, Opdyke traveled to Israel with her manager, Alan Boinus, and his wife, publicist Rosalie Boinus, for a television story arranged by the Boinuses for ABC Primetime Live, which aired on 10 June 1998 and re-united Opdyke with Hermann Morks, one of the twelve Jews whose lives she saved.

On the trip, Alan Boinus arranged for private meetings with Opdyke at the Knesset with former President and Prime Minister of Israel Shimon Peres and Speaker of the Knesset Dan Tichon. Boinus also arranged for other meetings in Israel for Opdyke with Mordecai Paldiel, Director of the Department of the Righteous Among the Nations at Yad Vashem, and with Holocaust survivor Roman Haller: Roman was the baby Opdyke saved during the war by convincing his parents, Ida and Lazar Haller—two of the 12 Jews that Gut had hidden in Rügemer's cellar—that Ida should carry the child to term after she became pregnant while hiding in the cellar. After the war, when a returning Rügemer was rejected by his wife and children in Nuremberg for being party to saving Jews, the Hallers took him into their own home in Munich. Rügemer became Zeide ('grandfather') to Roman Haller. Haller went on to serve as director of the German office of the Claims Conference, which represents world Jewry in negotiating restitution for the victims of Nazi persecution.

== Legacy ==
=== Memoir ===
Opdyke's memoir, In My Hands: Memories of a Holocaust Rescuer, was arranged by her then-manager Alan Boinus and published in 1999 through Random House, with co-author Jennifer Armstrong. Alan Boinus and his wife, Rosalie Boinus, among others, are thanked by Opdyke in the acknowledgements.

=== Irene Gut Opdyke Holocaust Rescuer Foundation ===
The Irene Gut Opdyke Holocaust Rescuer Foundation was founded in 1997 by Alan and Rosalie Boinus in honor of Opdyke to offer awards, grants, and scholarships to young people inspired by the heroic acts of Irene Gut Opdyke when she was young, so they may likewise stand up to racism, bigotry, and hate. It has since been disbanded.

=== Play ===
A play based on the book In My Hands, Irena's Vow, opened on Broadway on 29 March 2009 to mixed reviews. It was written by Dan Gordon and starred Tovah Feldshuh as Irena Gut. It had earlier premiered off-Broadway at the Baruch Performing Arts Center in New York City. After failing to find an audience, the play closed on 28 June 2009.

Irena's Vow, a film adaptation of the play, premiered in 2023 with Sophie Nélisse in the lead role.

=== Motion picture legal dispute ===
In 1998, Opdyke's story was the subject of legal action and cross-complaint when she sought to regain the motion picture rights to her life story, which she had previously assigned in an option agreement. Copyright attorney Carole Handler represented Opdyke and worked with the parties to reach an agreement. The case was dismissed with prejudice.

=== Songs ===
In 2012, Katy Carr, a British songwriter with Polish roots, released a song inspired by Opdyke titled "Mała Little Flower" on her album Paszport. On 26 September 2012, Trójka Radio in Poland nominated it as a song of the week. The German Metalcore band Heaven Shall Burn in 2025 dedicated the song A Whisper From Above to her.

== Works ==
- With coauthor Armstrong, Jennifer (1999). In my hands: Memories of a Holocaust rescuer (1st ed.). New York: Knopf. ISBN 9780679891819.
- With coauthor Elliot, Jeffrey M. (September 1992). Into the Flames: Life Story of a Righteous Gentile. Borgo Press. ISBN 978-0-89370-475-9.

== See also ==
- The Holocaust in Poland
- List of Poles: Holocaust resisters
- Polish Righteous Among the Nations
- Rescue of Jews during the Holocaust
  - Rescue of Jews by Poles during the Holocaust
