= Los de Abajo (disambiguation) =

Los de Abajo is a football supporters group at Universidad de Chile.

Los de Abajo may also refer to:

- Los de Abajo (band), a Mexican band
- Los de abajo (film), 1940 Mexican film directed by Chano Urueta
- Los de abajo (novel), 1915 novel by Mariano Azuela

== See also ==
- Arriba los de abajo (Above those who are below), 1998 musical work by Juan María Solare
- The Underdogs (disambiguation)
