= The Book Thief (film) =

2013 film by Brian Percival

- Theatrical release poster
- Directed by: Brian Percival
- Written by: Michael Petroni
- Based on: The Book Thief by Markus Zusak
- Produced by: Karen Rosenfelt; Ken Blancato
- Starring: Geoffrey Rush; Emily Watson; Sophie Nélisse
- Cinematography: Florian Ballhaus
- Edited by: John Wilson
- Music by: John Williams
- Production companies: Fox 2000 Pictures; Sunswept Entertainment; Studio Babelsberg
- Distributed by: 20th Century Fox
- Release dates: October 3, 2013 (Mill Valley Film Festival); November 8, 2013 (United States)
- Running time: 130 minutes
- Countries: United States; Germany
- Languages: English; German
- Budget: $19 million
- Box office: $76.6 million

The Book Thief is a 2013 war drama film directed by Brian Percival and starring Geoffrey Rush, Emily Watson, and Sophie Nélisse. The film is based on the 2005 novel of the same name by Markus Zusak and adapted by Michael Petroni. The film is about a young girl living with her adoptive German family during the Nazi era. Taught to read by her kind-hearted foster father, the girl begins "borrowing" books and sharing them with the Jewish refugee being sheltered by her foster parents in their home. The film features a musical score by Oscar-winning composer John Williams.

The Book Thief premiered at the Mill Valley Film Festival on October 3, 2013, and was released for general distribution in the United States on November 8, 2013. The film received mixed reviews upon its theatrical release with some reviewers praising its "fresher perspective on the war" and its focus on the "consistent thread of humanity" in the story, with other critics faulting the film's "wishful narrative". With a budget of $19 million, the film was successful at the box office, earning over $76 million.

The Book Thief received Oscar, Golden Globe and BAFTA nominations for its score. For her performance in the film, Sophie Nélisse won the Hollywood Film Festival Spotlight Award, the Satellite Newcomer Award, and the Phoenix Film Critics Society Award for Best Performance by a Youth in a Lead or Supporting Role – Female. The film was released on Blu-ray and DVD on March 11, 2014.

== Plot ==
In Nazi Germany, Liesel Meminger is sent to live with her foster parents Hans and Rosa Hubermann in the town of Molching during World War II. After stealing The Grave Digger’s Handbook at her brother's funeral, Liesel develops a love of reading, encouraged by Hans, who teaches her to read. She befriends her neighbour Rudy Steiner and joins the Hitler Youth, though she grows disillusioned with the regime.

At a book burning, Liesel salvages a scorched book, an act witnessed by Ilsa Hermann, the mayor's wife, who later allows her access to her private library. The Hubermanns hide Max Vandenberg, a Jewish man whose father once saved Hans's life. Liesel and Max bond over books and shared trauma, but when Hans publicly defends a Jewish neighbour, Max leaves to protect the family.

Liesel is convinced she saw Max marched through town with other prisoners, but is unable to confirm it. Soon after, an unannounced air raid devastates Molching. Liesel survives in the basement, but Hans, Rosa, Rudy, and others are killed. She is later reunited with Max after the war and lives to old age, with the story narrated by Death, who reflects on her life and the enduring power of words.

== Cast ==
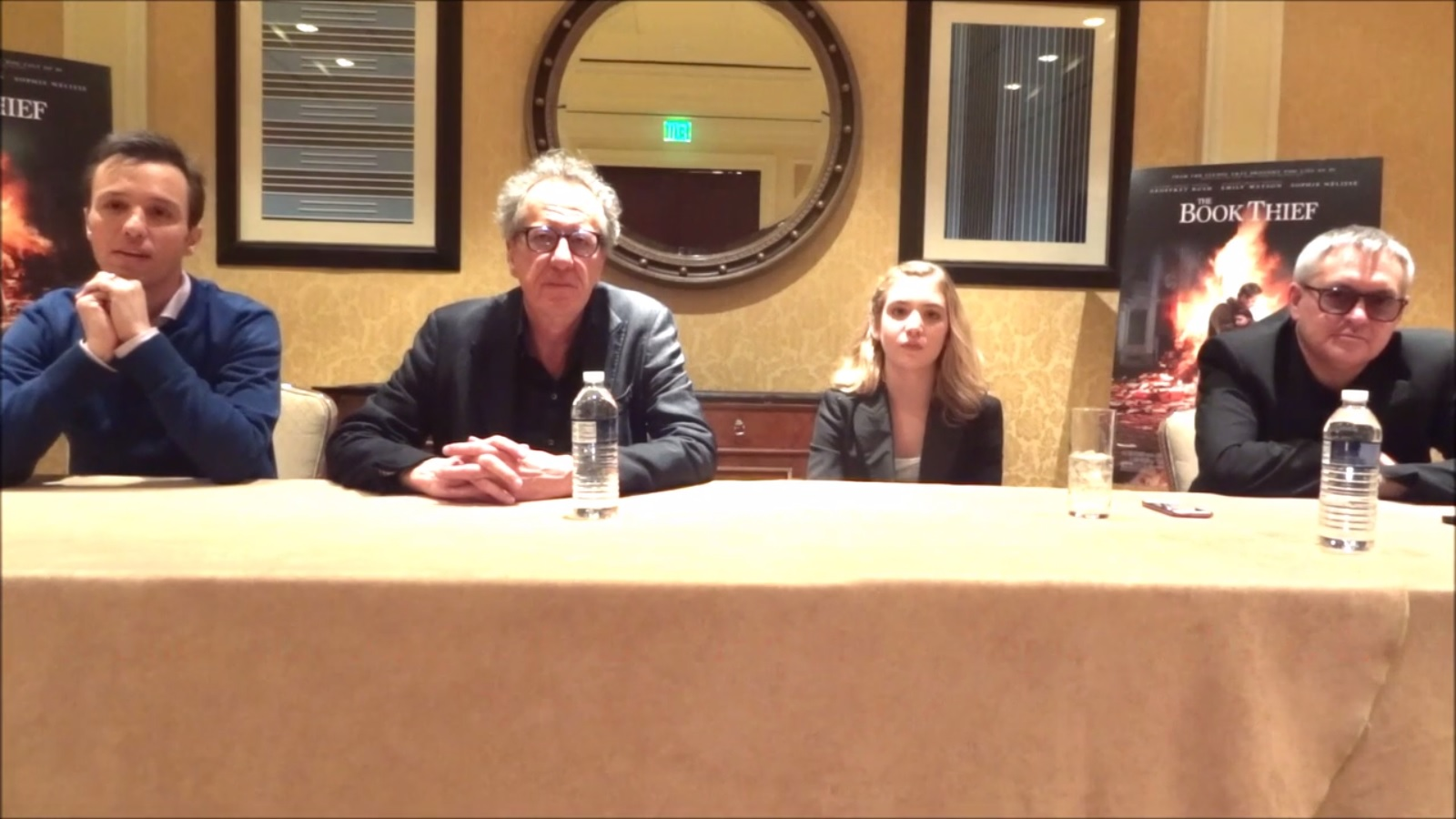
Left to right: book author Markus Zusak, stars Geoffrey Rush and Sophie Nélisse, director Brian Percival, interviewed about The Book Thief by Selig Film News in 2013.

- Sophie Nélisse as Liesel Meminger, the titular "book thief".
- Geoffrey Rush as Hans Hubermann, Liesel's kind-hearted foster father.
- Emily Watson as Rosa Hubermann, Liesel's bad-tempered foster mother.
- Nico Liersch as Rudy Steiner, Liesel's best friend who is in love with her.
- Ben Schnetzer as Max Vanderberg.
- Heike Makatsch as Paula Meminger, Liesel's mother.
- Rainer Bock as mayor Hermann.
- Barbara Auer as Ilsa Hermann, the Bürgermeister's (mayor's) wife.
- Roger Allam as Death, the film's narrator.
- Sandra Nedeleff as Sarah.
- Hildegard Schroedter as Frau Becker.
- Rafael Gareisen as Walter Kugler, Max's best friend.
- Gotthard Lange as the gravedigger.
- Godehard Giese as the policeman on the train.
- Oliver Stokowski as Alex Steiner, Rudy's father.
- Levin Liam as Franz Deutscher, bully and leader of Rudy's Hitler Youth squad.
- Carina Wiese as Barbara Steiner, Rudy's mother.
- Julian Lehmann as Werner Meminger, Liesel's brother.
- Martin Ontrop as Herr Lehman, Jewish man who was taken away and for whom Hans stood up.

== Production ==
A search for an actress to play the eponymous book thief, Liesel Meminger, occurred across the world. On February 4, 2013, it was announced that Canadian actress Sophie Nélisse was cast in the role and that Australian actor Geoffrey Rush and English actress Emily Watson would be playing Meminger's foster parents.

Principal photography began in early March 2013 at Babelsberg Studio in Potsdam-Babelsberg, Germany. Locations included Marquardt Palace. The first trailer was released on August 21, with the Bastille song "Haunt" as the music.

Markus Zusak, Australian author of the best-selling, award-winning book on which the film is based, confirmed on his blog that the film would be narrated by the character of "Death", as was the novel. After some speculation that Death might be voiced by the anonymous American actor who was used in the official trailer, it was announced that English actor Roger Allam of Game of Thrones would portray Death in the film.

== Soundtrack ==
The music for the film was composed and conducted by John Williams, and the soundtrack album containing the score was released by Sony Classical and Fox Music. The album was released in the United States on November 5, 2013. It was nominated for an Academy Award, BAFTA and Golden Globe for Best Original Score. It won Best Instrumental Album at the 57th Grammy Awards.

The Book Thief marked the first time since 2005 that Williams had scored a film not directed by Steven Spielberg.

== Release ==
Originally scheduled for January 17, 2014, The Book Thief's limited theatrical release was moved forward to November 8, 2013, due to the fact that it was finished ahead of schedule and in order to compete in the 2013–14 award season. It premiered at the Mill Valley Film Festival on October 3, 2013, and was screened at the Savannah Film Festival on October 29, 2013. It expanded to a wide release on November 27, 2013.

== Reception ==
=== Critical response ===
The Book Thief received mixed reviews from critics. Review aggregation website Rotten Tomatoes gives the film a score of 50%, based on 149 reviews, with an average score of 5.80/10. The site's consensus states, "A bit too safe in its handling of its Nazi Germany setting, The Book Thief counters its constraints with a respectful tone and strong performances." On Metacritic, the film has a score of 53 out of 100, based on 31 critics, indicating "mixed or average reviews".

In her review for the New Empress Magazine, Mairéad Roche praised the film for providing a "fresher perspective on the war" through the experiences of ordinary Germans who lived through the Nazi era. In addition to the "Oscar-baiting beautiful" cinematography and John Williams's film score that contribute to the film's emotional appeal, Roche singled out the performance of young Sophie Nélisse as Liesel that "matches the well-measured and seemingly effortless efforts of both Rush and Watson". Roche concluded,

The Book Thief weaves a consistent thread of humanity through its narrative via the commonality of Death, storytelling, and the concept of free will. The disturbing sight of children in Hitler Youth uniforms and Allied blanket bombing, when shown through the innocence of a child, humanises the German generation just living their lives without the hindsight of history. A blurring of vision due to tears is to be expected, but that effect is delivered with respect and dignity to the audience.

In his review following the Mill Valley Film Festival, Dennis Harvey at Variety magazine wrote, "Rush generously provides the movie's primary warmth and humor; Watson is pitch-perfect as a seemingly humorless scold with a well-buried soft side." Harvey also praised the film's cinematography and film score, noting that "impeccable design contributions are highlighted by Florian Ballhaus'[s] somber but handsome widescreen lensing and an excellent score by John Williams that reps his first feature work for a director other than Steven Spielberg in years."

Stephanie Merry of The Washington Post was less impressed with the film, giving it two and half out of four stars. Merry felt that the film "has its moments of brilliance, thanks in large part to an adept cast" but that the film ultimately shows the difficulties of bringing a successful novel to the screen. In his review for the Los Angeles Times, Robert Abele was also unimpressed, describing the film as "just another tasteful, staid Hollywoodization of terribleness, in which a catastrophic time acts as a convenient backdrop for a wishful narrative rather than the springboard for an honest one".

=== Accolades ===
Award	Category	Nominee	Result
AACTA International Awards	Best Supporting Actor	Geoffrey Rush	Nominated
Academy Awards	Best Original Score	John Williams	Nominated
British Academy Film Awards	Best Film Music	John Williams	Nominated
Critics' Choice Movie Awards	Best Young Actor/Actress	Sophie Nélisse	Nominated
Golden Globe Awards	Best Original Score	John Williams	Nominated
Grammy Awards	Best Instrumental Composition	John Williams	Won
Hollywood Film Awards	Spotlight	Sophie Nélisse	Won
Phoenix Film Critics Society	Best Performance by a Youth in a Lead or Supporting Role – Female	Sophie Nélisse	Won
Satellite Awards	Best Supporting Actress	Emily Watson	Nominated
Satellite Awards	Best Original Score	John Williams	Nominated
Satellite Awards	Newcomer	Sophie Nélisse	Won
Young Artist Awards	Best Leading Young Actress in a Feature Film	Sophie Nélisse	Won

== Home media ==
The Book Thief was released on Blu-ray and DVD on March 11, 2014.
