= Underdog (novel) =

Book by Torbjörn Flygt

- First edition
- Author: Torbjörn Flygt
- Language: Swedish
- Published: 2001
- Publisher: Norstedts Förlag
- Publication place: Sweden
- Awards: August Prize of 2001

Underdog is a 2001 novel by Swedish author Torbjörn Flygt. It won the August Prize in 2001.
