= Fighting Ruben Wolfe =

2000 novel by Markus Zusak

- First edition
- Author: Markus Zusak
- Language: English
- Series: Wolfe Trilogy
- Genre: Young-adult novel
- Publisher: Vintage
- Publication date: 1 April 2000
- Publication place: Australia
- Media type: Print
- Pages: 156 pp.
- ISBN: 1862914311
- Preceded by: The Underdog
- Followed by: When Dogs Cry

Fighting Ruben Wolfe is a young adult fiction novel by Markus Zusak. Originally published in Australia by Omnibus in 2000.

Fighting Ruben Wolfe is the second book featuring brothers Cameron and Ruben Wolfe and their family. The first book is The Underdog and the third book is When Dogs Cry. These books are referred to as the Wolfe Trilogy.

== Synopsis ==
Brothers Cameron and Ruben Wolfe join a boxing circuit in order to earn some money for themselves and their family. But they learn that there isn't much glamour in such a life.

== Publishing history ==
After the novel's initial publication in Australia by Omnibus Books in 2000 it was reprinted as follows:

- Arthur A. Levine Books (an imprint of Scholastic Press), USA, 2001
- Definitions, UK, 2013
- Omninbus Books, Australia, 2007, 2019 and 2023

The novel was also translated into Danish, Polish and Japanese in 2003; Dutch in 2004; Swedish in 2009; German in 2010; Korean in 2012; Turkish in 2013; and Bulgarian in 2014.

== Awards ==
In 2001, Fighting Ruben Wolfe was named an honour book for the Children's Book Council of Australia's Children's Book of the Year Award: Older Readers.
