= When Dogs Cry =

Book by Markus Zusak

- First edition
- Author: Markus Zusak
- Language: English
- Genre: Young adult fiction
- Publisher: Pan Macmillan Australia
- Publication date: 2001
- Publication place: Australia
- Media type: Print (hardback and paperback)
- Pages: 250 pp

When Dogs Cry is the third young adult fiction novel written by Australian writer Markus Zusak in the Wolfe family books. It is a stand-alone companion novel (sequel) to his young adult fiction novels Fighting Ruben Wolfe and The Underdog. It was first published in 2001 by Pan Macmillan Australia Pty limited. It was published in United States by Arthur A. Levine Books, an imprint of Scholastic Press, April 2003 under the title Getting the Girl. Both titles come from the titles of poems in the book.

From the back of the soft cover Australian edition titled When Dogs Cry:

'You're a bit of a lonely bastard, aren't you?' said Rube. 'Yeah," I answered, 'I guess I am.' But Cameron Wolfe is hungry. He's sick of being the filthy, torn, half-smiling, half-scowling underdog. He's finally met a girl. He's got words in his spirit. And now he's out to prove that there's nothing more beautiful than an underdog whose willing to stand up.

From the back of the soft cover American PUSH edition titled Getting the Girl:

"Cameron's always lived in the shadow of his older brother Ruben. Rube's a talker, a natural, an instant favorite with all the girls he meets. Cameron on the other hand, is... quiet. Sweet. Confused. Cameron doesn't mind this. Not until Ruben starts dating Octavia. She's not like all the other girls Ruben's been with. She's got spark. And Cameron is flat-out in love with her. But a girl like Octavia would never go for a guy like Cameron... Or would she?"

== Setting ==
Place: Sydney, Australia near Central Station, and the surrounding communities including Hurstville and Glebe.

Time: The present. This is a realistic fiction novel. The lack of cell phones and a few other clues may set this book in the late-1990s.

== Symbols ==
Dogs: Zusak uses the dog as a metaphor for tenacity of the Wolfe family and Cameron specifically. The Wolfe surname is prevalent in the story, and when Steve is on the footy field (AFL), fans and opponents are yelling "Wolfe" (one can imagine it may even sound like a dog barking). The dog Miffy is a pitiful dog that Cameron and Ruben almost adopt as their own (it fits in with their rough and scrappy family), and the dog's death may symbolise the death of the familial relationship as it once was. Cameron writes a poem titled "When Dogs Cry" where he compares himself to the dog, "He looked hungry, desperate, until he simply stood there, and began."

Miffy's Ashes: The dog Miffy's death was an event "that had the potential to turn everything on its head." The dog was cremated, and the small funeral that consisted of spreading Miffy's ashes symbolised a change in Cameron and a change in all the major relationships that he is involved with in the novel. It is also worth noting that Octavia's last name is "Ash".

The Waterfront: The ocean is often used in literature as a symbol for change or movement, and in When Dogs Cry is no exception. Cameron's feelings and identity have an ebb and flow quality as he moves throughout the book. He discovers Octavia at the waterfront, gives her a seashell there that she turns into a necklace and wears, and he takes her another shell in the end of the book and essentially releases her.

The Bridge: The Bridge that Cameron speaks of in his words, is a metaphor for where he is heading in life.

== Young-adult issues ==
- Sibling rivalry
- First love
- Physical violence
- Self-discovery

== Awards ==
- Honour Book – CBCA Children's Book of the Year Award: Older Readers (2002).
- Winner - Queensland- Queensland Premier's Literary Awards (2002)
