= The Book Thief =

2005 novel by Markus Zusak

- First edition cover
- Author: Markus Zusak
- Illustrator: Trudy White
- Cover artist: Colin Anderson/ X Pictures/Getty Images
- Language: English, German
- Genre: Novel-Historical Fiction, Bildungsroman
- Published: 2005 Picador
- Publication place: Australia
- Media type: Print (Hardback & Paperback)
- Pages: 584
- ISBN: 033036426X
- OCLC: 183612599
- LC Class: PZ7.Z837 Boo 2007
- For additional editions see The Book Thief > Editions at Goodreads.com

The Book Thief is a historical fiction novel by the Australian author Markus Zusak, set in Nazi Germany during World War II. Published in 2005, The Book Thief became an international bestseller and was translated into 63 languages and has sold over 17 million copies worldwide. It was adapted into the 2013 feature film, The Book Thief.

The novel follows the adventures of a young girl, Liesel Meminger. Narrated by Death, the novel presents the lives and viewpoints of the many victims of the ongoing war. Themes throughout the story include death, literature, and love.

== Plot ==
Narrated by Death, the story follows the young girl Liesel Meminger, living with foster parents Hans and Rosa Hubermann in Nazi Germany during World War II. Liesel steals her first book after the death of her brother, in the graveyard where he was buried. Hans develops a close relationship with her, helping her learn to read and write. Recognizing the power of writing and sharing literature, Liesel steals more books, some alongside her best friend, Rudy.

While adapting to her new home, Liesel is exposed to the horrors of the war and politics. As the political situation in Germany deteriorates, her foster parents conceal a Jewish man named Max Vandenburg. Liesel trades stories with Max in the basement, with the two finding a common interest in words. When she is collecting laundry for her mother, she forms a relationship with the mayor's wife Ilsa, who allows her to read books in her library.

Hans brings suspicion on his household that he might be a sympathizer with political adversaries of Germany. Max leaves the Hubermanns' home soon after out of fear that the suspicion could endanger him or the family. Liesel receives a gift of blank paper from Ilsa and begins writing her own story. Bombs fall on Liesel's street, killing her friends, family and neighbors. Liesel is the sole survivor because she was working on her manuscript in the basement at the time of the raid.

Many years later (what Death calls "just yesterday") Liesel dies from old age in the suburbs of Sydney, Australia with a family and many friends. She has never forgotten Hans, Rosa, Max, Rudy or her brother. When Death collects Liesel's soul, he gives her the manuscript she lost in the bombing. She asks him if he read it and understood it, but Death is unable to understand the duality of humanity. Death's last words for Liesel (and possibly the reader) are "I am haunted by humans."

== Characters ==
Death
Death, the collector of souls, narrates the story of a young girl during the horrific times of Nazi Germany and the Second World War. To the reader, Death insists that things "most definitely can be cheerful" while relating that they most certainly also cannot be nice. Sometimes Death is "compelled" to take action in sympathy with the human story.

Liesel Meminger
The story's protagonist is a girl on the verge of adolescence, with German blonde hair and brown eyes. The Hubermanns foster her after her biological father is taken away by the Nazis before the novel starts, due to being a Communist. Her brother dies and her mother is forced to send her to a foster home to avoid Nazi persecution. Liesel is the titular book thief; fascinated by the power of words, she steals several books throughout the story from a gravedigger, a bonfire, and the mayor's wife, Ilsa Hermann.

Hans Hubermann (Papa)
Liesel's foster father and husband to Rosa, Hans was a German soldier during the First World War. He is now an accordion player and painter. He develops a close and loving relationship with Liesel and becomes a source of strength and support for her. Like Liesel, he doesn't have much experience with reading. The two help each other with reading and write all the words they learn on a wall in the basement. He helps Max because Max's father saved Hans in the First World War.

Rosa Hubermann (Mama)
Rosa is Liesel's sharp-tongued foster mother. She has a "wardrobe" build and a displeased face, five feet tall, brown-grey hair often tightly tied in a bun. Despite her temper, she is a loving wife to Hans and mother to Liesel. To supplement the household income, she does washing and ironing for wealthier households in Molching.

Max Vandenburg
A Jewish fist-fighter who takes refuge from the Nazi regime in the Hubermanns’ basement. He is the son of a First World War German soldier who fought alongside Hans Hubermann, and the two developed a close friendship during the war. He has brown, feather-like hair and swampy brown eyes. During the Nazi reign of terror, Hans agrees to shelter Max and hide him from the Nazi party. During his stay at the Hubermanns' house, Max befriends Liesel, and they share an affinity for words. He writes two books for her and presents her with a sketchbook that contains his life story, which helps Liesel to develop as a writer and reader, which, in turn, saves her life from the bombs falling on her.

Rudy Steiner
Liesel's neighbor Rudy has bony legs, blue eyes, lemon-colored hair, and a penchant for getting in the middle of situations when he shouldn't. Despite having the appearance of an archetypal German, he does not support the Nazis. As a relatively poor household member with six children, Rudy is habitually hungry. He is known throughout the neighborhood because of the "Jesse Owens incident" in which he colored himself black with charcoal one night and ran one hundred meters at the local sports field. He is academically and athletically gifted which attracts the attention of Nazi Party officials, leading to attempted recruitment. His lack of support for the Nazi party becomes problematic as the story progresses. Rudy becomes Liesel's best friend and later falls in love with her.

Ilsa Hermann
The wife of the mayor of Molching who employs Rosa Hubermann. She fell into a state of depression after the death of her only son Johann, in the Great War. Ilsa allows Liesel to visit, read, and steal books from her library. She gives Liesel a little black book which leads the girl to write her own story, "The Book Thief".

Werner Meminger
Liesel's little brother who died suddenly on the train with his mother and other sister, was buried in a cemetery near the train tracks. His death is what allowed the first book to be stolen: a gravedigger's manual dropped by a young boy learning to work in the cemetery.

Paula Meminger
Liesel's mother is only mentioned in the story a few times. She sent her children to foster care to save them from Nazi persecution. For a while, Liesel writes letters to her mother thinking there is a chance she is still alive.

Hans Jr
Hans Jr is the son of Hans and Rosa Huberman. He is very supportive of the Nazi party and fights with his father about it frequently. He is eventually sent to participate in the Battle of Stalingrad.

== Themes ==
=== Mortality ===
The book is introduced by the character/narrator Death, which underlines that mortality is very present in the lives of each character. Throughout the novel, the deaths of prominent characters reaffirm the presence of mortality. Because the novel takes place during the Second World War, death and genocide are nearly omnipresent in the novel.

Death is presented in a manner that is less distant and threatening. Because Death narrates and explains the reasons behind each character's destruction and explains how he feels that he must take the life of each character, Death is given a sense of care rather than fear. At one point, Death states "even death has a heart," which reaffirms that there is a care present in the concept of death and dying.

=== Language, reading and writing ===
Throughout the novel, language, reading, and writing are presented as symbolic elements of expression and freedom. They provide identity and personal liberation to those characters who have, or who gain, the power of literacy: "the true power of words", and they provide a framework for Liesel's coming of age. At the beginning of the story shortly after her brother's funeral, Liesel finds a book in the snow, one she is unable to read. Under tutelage by her foster father Hans, she slowly learns to read and write. By the end of the novel, her character arc is largely defined by her progress in reading and writing. The development of Liesel's literacy mirrors her physical growth and maturing over the course of the story.

Literacy skills and vernacular of speech also serve as social markers. Wealthy citizens in the story are often portrayed as literate, as owning books and even their own libraries, while the poor are illiterate and do not own books. Rosa Huberman's abrasive and oft-times scatological speech towards her family and others is emblematic of the despairing lives of the poorer classes.

The Nazi burning of books in the story represents evil incarnate. Symbolically, Liesel's rescue of a book from a Nazi bonfire represents her reclaiming of freedom and her resistance to being controlled by the all-pervasive state.

=== Love ===
In the midst of war and loss, love is a central theme which acts as a catalyst for change and sacrifice throughout the book. Liesel overcomes her traumas by learning to love and be loved by her foster family and her friends. At the beginning of the novel, Liesel is traumatized not only by the death of her brother and her separation from her only family but also by the larger issues of war-torn Germany and the destruction wrought by the Nazi party. As Liesel's foster father Hans develops a relationship with her, this relationship helps create healing and growth. This pattern is reflected in the dynamic between the Hubermann family and Max. In a society ruled by governmental policies that presume to stand in judgment of who is truly human, the Hubermanns' relationship with Max defies the Nazi regime. Furthermore, the love that Max and Liesel develop through their friendship creates a strong contrast to the fascist hate in the backdrop of the story, especially since Max is Jewish.

The theme of love also intertwines with the themes of identity and language/reading because all of these themes have the purpose of providing freedom and power in the midst of chaos and control. Liesel's final words in her own written story are "I have hated the words and I have loved them, and I hope I have made them right." She has the power to show her love on paper.

== Awards ==
- 2006: Commonwealth Writers' Prize for Best Book (South East Asia & South Pacific)
- 2006: School Library Journal Best Book of the Year
- 2006: Daniel Elliott Peace Award
- 2006: Publishers Weekly Best Children's Book of the Year
- 2006: National Jewish Book Award for Children's and Young Adult Literature
- 2006: Bulletin Blue Ribbon Book
- 2007: Michael L. Printz Honor Book. The Printz award is given to the best book for teenagers, based only on the quality of the writing.
- 2007: Book Sense Book of the Year Award for Children's Literature
- 2007: Sydney Taylor Book Award for the best in Jewish children's and YA literature
- 2007: Best Books for Young Adults (American Library club)

== Film adaptation ==
A film adaptation was released on 8 November 2013. It was directed by Brian Percival. Michael Petroni wrote the script. It stars Geoffrey Rush and Emily Watson as Hans and Rosa Hubermann, Ben Schnetzer as Max Vandenburg, Nico Liersch as Rudy Steiner, and Sophie Nélisse as Liesel Meminger. John Williams wrote the music soundtrack. Much of the movie was filmed in Görlitz, Germany.

== Musical adaptation ==
A musical theater version premiered at the Octagon Theatre in Bolton, Greater Manchester, England, on 17 September 2022. The libretto was written by Jodi Picoult and Timothy Allen McDonald, with music and lyrics by Elyssa Samsel and Kate Anderson. Directed by Lotte Wakeham.

Following its production at Bolton, the show embarked on a short tour, with performances at Belgrade Theatre (Coventry) and Curve (Leicester) in 2023.

The production then underwent further development with a concert presentation at the Prince of Wales Theatre in October 2026. This version of the production was directed by Tom Jackson Greaves and produced by DEM Productions.
