= Markus Zusak =

Australian writer (born 1975)

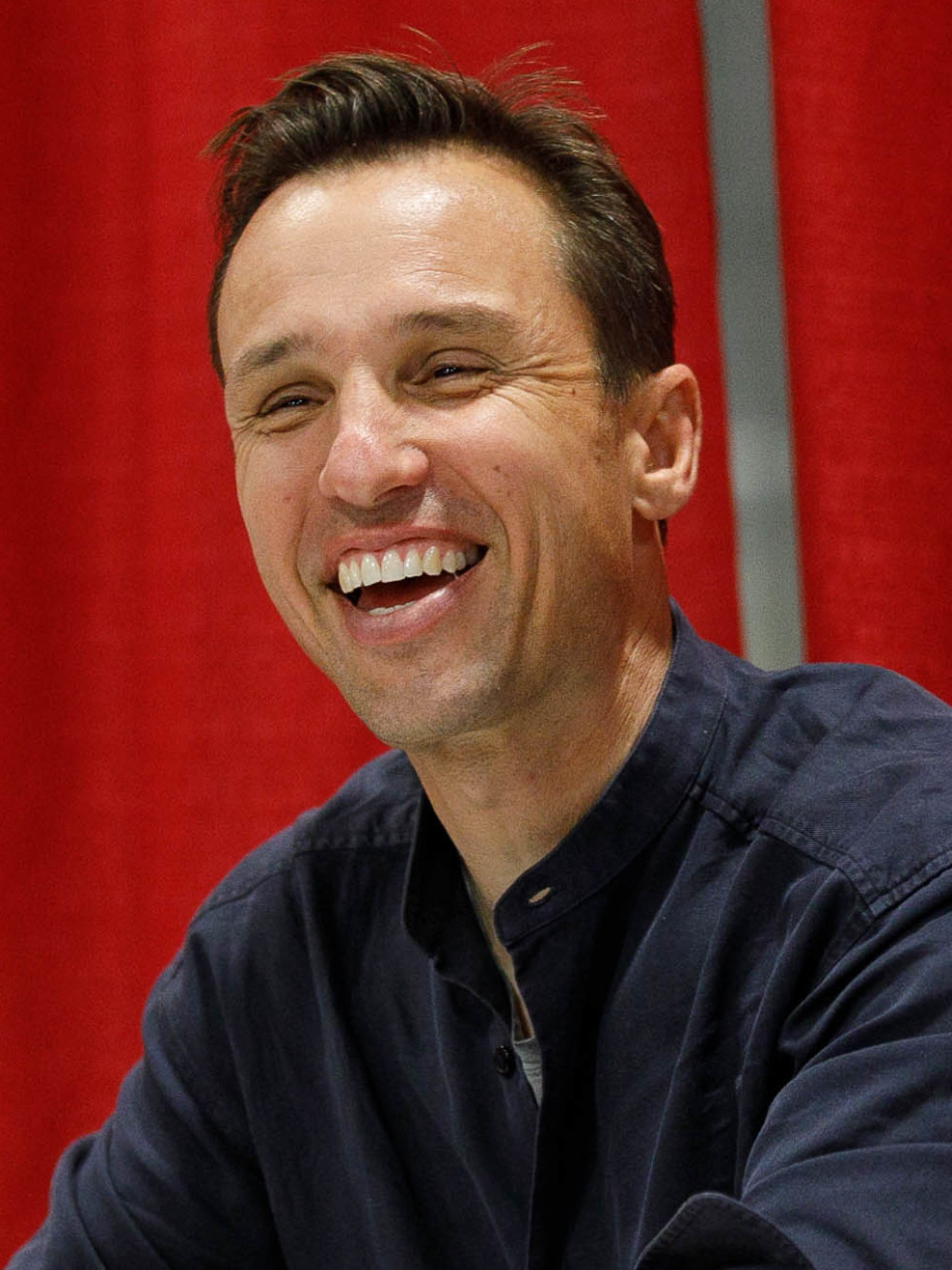
- Zusak in 2019
- Born: Markus Frank Zusak; 23 June 1975 (age 51); Sydney, Australia
- Education: Engadine High School; University of New South Wales
- Occupation: Writer
- Spouse: Mika Zusak
- Children: 3 children
- Writing career
- Period: 1999–present day
- Notable awards: Margaret A. Edwards Award; 2014
- Website: markuszusak.com

Markus Zusak (born 23 June 1975) is an Australian-German writer. He is best known for The Book Thief and The Messenger, two novels that became international bestsellers. He won the Margaret Edwards Award in 2014.

== Early life ==
Zusak was born in Sydney, Australia. His mother Elisabeth Zusak is originally from Germany and his father Helmut Zusak is Austrian. They immigrated to Australia in the late 1950s. Zusak is the youngest of four children and has two sisters and one brother. He attended Engadine High School and briefly returned there to teach English while writing. He studied English and history at the University of New South Wales, graduating with a Bachelor of Arts and a Diploma of Education.

== Career ==
Zusak is the author of seven books. His first three books, The Underdog, Fighting Ruben Wolfe, and When Dogs Cry, released between 1999 and 2001, were all published internationally.

The Messenger (I Am the Messenger in the United States), published in 2002, won the 2003 CBC Book of the Year Award (Older Readers), the New South Wales Premier's Literary Award's Ethel Turner Prize for Young People's Literature, and was a runner-up for the Michael L. Printz Award.

The Book Thief was published in 2005 and has since been translated into more than 40 languages. The Book Thief was adapted into a film of the same name in 2013. In 2014, Zusak delivered a talk called "The Failurist" at TEDxSydney at the Sydney Opera House. It focused on his drafting process and journey to success through writing The Book Thief.

In March 2016 Zusak talked about his then unfinished novel Bridge of Clay. He stated that the book was 90% finished but that, "I'm a completely different person than the person who wrote The Book Thief. And this is also the scary thing—I'm a different person to the one who started Bridge of Clay eight, nine years ago ... I've got to get it done this year, or else I'll probably finally have to set it aside." It was finally released in October 2018.

A TV series based on The Messenger premiered on ABC in 2023. Zusak said his next book would be a "memoir type thing" and not fiction. In 2024, he put this into practice through publishing Three Wild Dogs (and the truth).

== Awards ==
In 2006, Zusak received The Sydney Morning Herald's Young Australian Novelist of the Year Award. In 2014, he won the Margaret Edwards Award from the American Library Association (ALA), which annually recognises an author and "a specific body of his or her work, for significant and lasting contribution to young adult literature".

Bridge of Clay is a Junior Library Guild selection.

In 2005, The Bulletin of the Center for Children's Books and Publishers Weekly named I Am the Messenger (The Messenger) one of the best children's books of the year.

Awards for Zusak's writing
Year	Title	Award	Category	Result	Ref.
2001	Fighting Ruben Wolfe	Children's Book of the Year Award: Older Readers	—	Honor	
2001	Fighting Ruben Wolfe	New South Wales Premier's Literary Awards	Ethel Turner Prize	Shortlist	
2002	When Dogs Cry	Children's Book of the Year Award: Older Readers	—	Honor	
2003	The Messenger	Children's Book of the Year Award: Older Readers	—	Winner	
2003	The Messenger	New South Wales Premier's Literary Awards	Ethel Turner Prize	Winner	
2006	The Messenger	Michael L. Printz Award	—	Honor	
2007	The Messenger	Deutscher Jugendliteraturpreis	Jugendjury	Winner	
2006	The Book Thief	Cybils Award	Young Adult Fiction	Finalist	
2006	The Book Thief	Kathleen Mitchell Award	—	Winner	
2006	The Book Thief	National Jewish Book Award	Children's and Young Adult Literature	Winner	
2007	The Book Thief	Michael L. Printz Award	—	Honor	
2008	The Book Thief	Ena Noël Award for Encouragement	—	Winner	
2009	The Book Thief	Deutscher Jugendliteraturpreis	Jugendjury	Winner	
2014	Fighting Ruben Wolfe; When Dogs Cry; The Messenger; The Book Thief	Margaret Edwards Award	—	Selected	

== Publications ==
=== Standalone books ===
- —— (2002). The Messenger (I Am the Messenger). Pan MacMillan. ISBN 9780330363884.
- —— (2006). The Book Thief. Picador. ISBN 9780330364263.
- —— (2018). Bridge of Clay. Picador. ISBN 9780857525956.

=== The Underdog trilogy ===
- —— (1999). The Underdog. Omnibus Books. ISBN 9781862914131.
- —— (2000). Fighting Ruben Wolfe. Omnibus Books. ISBN 9780439241885.
- —— (2001). When Dogs Cry (Getting the Girl). Arthur A. Levine Books. ISBN 9780439389495.

=== Non-fiction ===
- —— (2025). Three Wild Dogs and the Truth. Pan Macmillan. ISBN 9781761561825.
