= Heartbreak High (2022 TV series) =

Australian TV series (since 2022)

- Season 3 promotional poster
- Genre: Comedy drama Teen drama
- Created by: Hannah Carroll Chapman
- Directed by: Adam Murfet; Jessie Oldfield; Gracie Otto; Neil Sharma; Nina Buxton; Tig Terera
- Starring: Ayesha Madon; Thomas Weatherall; Bryn Chapman Parish; Asher Yasbincek; James Majoos; Chloé Hayden; Will McDonald; Gemma Chua-Tran; Sherry-Lee Watson; Josh Heuston; Brodie Townsend; Chika Ikogwe; Scott Major; Rachel House; Sam Rechner; Kartanya Maynard; Angus Sampson; Ioane Sa'ula; Aki Munroe; William McKenna; Ben Turland
- Country of origin: Australia
- Original language: English
- No. of seasons: 3
- No. of episodes: 24

Production
- Producers: Carly Heaton; Sarah Freeman; Jeroen Koopman; Tarik Traidia; Brian Abel; Michael Jenkins; Megan Palinkas
- Production locations: Sydney, New South Wales
- Cinematography: Drew English; Simon Ozolins; Campbell Brown; Kate Cornish; Josh Flavell
- Running time: 45–52 minutes
- Production companies: Fremantle Australia & NewBe

Original release
- Network: Netflix
- Release: 14 September 2022 – 25 March 2026

Related
- Heartbreak High (original 1994 TV series); The Heartbreak Kid

Heartbreak High is an Australian comedy drama television series created for Netflix by Hannah Carroll Chapman. The series follows the students and teachers of Hartley High as they navigate relationships, sexuality, identity and adolescence. It is a soft reboot of the 1994 series (itself a spin-off of the 1993 feature film The Heartbreak Kid), which first screened on Network Ten.

It features an ensemble cast including Ayesha Madon, Thomas Weatherall, Bryn Chapman Parish, Asher Yasbincek, James Majoos, Chloé Hayden, Will McDonald, Gemma Chua-Tran, Sherry-Lee Watson, Josh Heuston, Brodie Townsend, Chika Ikogwe, Scott Major and Rachel House. Sam Rechner, Kartanya Maynard and Angus Sampson joined the series in its second season. Ioane Sa'ula, Aki Munroe, William McKenna and Ben Turland joined for its third and final season.

Heartbreak High premiered on Netflix on 14 September 2022. The following month, it was renewed for a second season, which premiered on 11 April 2024. Production on the third and final season began in November 2024, and the season was released on 25 March 2026. The series received praise for its performances, representation, costumes and visual style. It has received numerous accolades, including the 2023 International Emmy Award for Kids: Live-Action. The series has also won eight AACTA Awards, including Best Drama Series.

== Premise ==
=== Season 1 ===
The first season begins when a map documenting the sexual relationships among students at Hartley High is discovered. Amerie (Ayesha Madon), who created the map with her best friend Harper (Asher Yasbincek), takes sole responsibility after Harper abruptly ends their friendship. The students named on the map are required to attend a new Sexual Literacy Tutorial (SLT), while Amerie becomes a social outcast. She befriends Darren (James Majoos) and Quinni (Chloé Hayden) and begins a relationship with new student Malakai (Thomas Weatherall), while Harper becomes involved with Dusty (Josh Heuston). Darren grows close to Ca$h (Will McDonald), and Quinni begins dating Sasha (Gemma Chua-Tran). After Malakai is assaulted by police following a Mardi Gras party, his relationship with Amerie deteriorates.

Amerie and Harper's estrangement continues as Harper refuses to explain why she ended their friendship. After a false rumour about Amerie and SLT teacher Jojo Obah causes Jojo to resign, the students protest and she is reinstated. Harper eventually reveals that, after becoming separated from Amerie at a music festival, she was taken by Chook's gang and nearly sexually assaulted before Ca$h helped her escape. She sought help at Amerie's house but was turned away without Amerie understanding what had happened, before returning home and being assaulted by her father. Amerie and Harper reconcile, and Ca$h obtains video evidence that leads to the arrest of several members of the gang, including himself, although Chook avoids arrest. Amerie and Harper subsequently burn Chook's car.

=== Season 2 ===
The second season follows Amerie as she attempts to repair her reputation by running for school captain. A series of dead birds and anonymous threats targeting her leads Quinni (Chloé Hayden) to investigate the identity of a stalker dubbed "Bird Psycho". Meanwhile, new physical education teacher Mr. Voss encourages a group of male students, the CUMLORDS, in opposition to the SLTs, while Zoe promotes abstinence through the Puriteens. Amerie and Malakai (Thomas Weatherall) briefly reconnect before Malakai begins a relationship with new student Rowan (Sam Rechner), whom Amerie later grows close to. After discovering that she is pregnant by Malakai, Amerie terminates the pregnancy with his support. When she is unable to attend the school captain debate, Quinni takes her place and unexpectedly wins the election.

Elsewhere, Ca$h (Will McDonald) is released from prison and reunites with Darren (James Majoos) while attempting to distance himself from Chook, Harper (Asher Yasbincek) develops a relationship with Ant, and Spider (Bryn Chapman Parish) and Missy (Sherry-Lee Watson) begin dating. Bird Psycho is ultimately revealed to be Rowan, who blames Amerie for a childhood incident that indirectly led to his younger brother's death. During the school formal, Rowan traps Amerie and Harper inside the school before accepting that Amerie was not responsible for his brother's death. At the same time, a fire accidentally started during Voss and the CUMLORDS' protest spreads to the school, and Quinni rescues Amerie, Harper and Rowan. Voss is arrested, while Malakai leaves for Switzerland after placing a note confessing his feelings for Amerie in her locker; the note is destroyed in the fire before she can read it.

=== Season 3 ===
The third season follows Amerie (Ayesha Madon) and her friends through their final year at Hartley High as they prepare for graduation and life beyond school. Following the fire at the end of the previous season, tensions develop with rival school St. Bruno's. When St. Bruno's students disrupt Hartley's Muck-Up Day, Amerie and the others retaliate by stealing a bust from the school and attempting to place it on a carnival ride. The prank goes wrong when someone activates the ride, injuring Malakai (Thomas Weatherall) and leaving a carnival worker in a coma. Fearing that their involvement could jeopardise their graduation and futures, the group conceals what happened while trying to identify who activated the ride.

Meanwhile, Amerie's relationship with St. Bruno's student Noah (Ioane Sa'ula) is complicated by Malakai's return from Switzerland, which reignites their unresolved feelings for one another. Darren (James Majoos) and Ca$h (Will McDonald) make plans for life after school, Quinni (Chloé Hayden) develops a relationship with Taz while pursuing her writing, and Missy (Sherry-Lee Watson) and Spider (Bryn Chapman Parish) eventually end their relationship. As evidence from the carnival incident emerges, the group comes under police scrutiny before Sasha (Gemma Chua-Tran) is ultimately revealed to have activated the ride after feeling excluded by the others. She turns herself in. Amerie and Malakai reconcile, Quinni and Taz make plans to publish Velvet Thrones, Darren moves to New York while remaining with Ca$h, and Amerie leaves on a road trip with Harper (Asher Yasbincek).

== Cast ==
=== Main ===
- Ayesha Madon as Amerie Wadia, an Indian-Australian student who becomes a social outcast after the discovery of a map documenting students' sexual relationships.
- Thomas Weatherall as Malakai Mitchell, a Bundjalung student and basketball player who transfers to Hartley High.
- Bryn Chapman Parish as Spencer "Spider" White, a Hartley High student known for his antagonistic behaviour.
- Asher Yasbincek as Harper McLean, Amerie's best friend, with whom she has a falling-out at the beginning of the series.
- James Majoos as Darren Rivers, a student who befriends Amerie.
- Chloé Hayden as Quinn "Quinni" Gallagher-Jones, Darren's best friend, who is autistic.
- Will McDonald as Douglas "Ca$h" Piggott, an eshay involved in drug dealing who also works as a food delivery driver.
- Gemma Chua-Tran as Sasha So, a politically active Chinese-Australian student.
- Sherry-Lee Watson as Missy Beckett, an Indigenous Australian student and Sasha's former girlfriend.
- Joshua Heuston as Dustin "Dusty" Reid, a musician who becomes romantically involved with Harper (season 1; guest in seasons 2–3).
- Brodie Townsend as Anthony "Ant" Vaughn, a student at Hartley High.
- Chika Ikogwe as Josephine "Jojo" Obah, an English teacher who also teaches Sexual Literacy Tutorial (SLT).
- Scott Major as Peter Rivers, Darren's father (season 1, reprising his role from the 1994 series).
- Rachel House as Stacy "Woodsy" Woods, the principal of Hartley High.
- Sam Rechner as Rowan Callaghan, a student from Dubbo who transfers to Hartley High (season 2).
- Kartanya Maynard as Zoe Clarke, an Indigenous Australian student, Missy's cousin and an advocate of sexual abstinence (seasons 2–3).
- Angus Sampson as Timothy Voss, a physical education teacher who encourages a group of male students opposed to SLT (season 2).

=== Recurring and notable guest stars ===
- Isabella Gutierrez as Chaka Cardenes (seasons 1–2, reprising her role from the 1994 series)
- Ben Oxenbould as Justin McLean, Harper's father (season 1)
- Justin Smith as Jim, the school maintenance worker (season 1)
- Sandy Sharma as Huma Wadia, Amerie's mother (seasons 1–2)
- Tom Wilson as Michael "Chook" Cooper, leader of the eshays and Ca$h's former associate (seasons 1–2)
- Kye McMaster as Tilla, Ca$h's friend (season 1)
- Ari McCarthy as Jayden, Ca$h's friend (season 1)
- Shivadhya Mehta as Yasmin, Amerie's younger sister (seasons 1–2)
- Rudra Mehta as Naseem, Amerie's younger brother (seasons 1–2)
- Natascha Borg as Mrs Vaughn, Ant's mother (season 1)
- Bolude Watson as Anne, Darren's mother (season 1)
- Maggie Dence as Nan, Ca$h's grandmother
- Kobie Dee as Jai Beckett, Missy's older brother (seasons 1 and 3)
- Robyn Malcolm as Cait White, Spider's mother (season 2)
- Stephen Hunter as Coach Arkell (season 1)
- Jeremy Lindsay Taylor as Kurt Peterson (season 1, reprising his role from the 1994 series)
- Natalie Tran as Rhea Brown, a local author (season 1)
- Trystan Go as Felix, Zoe's boyfriend (seasons 2–3)
- Jude Hyland as Jett Callaghan, Rowan's younger brother (season 2)
- Lara Cox as Anita Scheppers (season 2, reprising her role from the 1994 series)
- Peter Carroll as Roger, Nan's boyfriend (season 2)
- Ivar Kants as Principal McMahon of St. Bruno's (season 3; Kants previously portrayed Roberto Bordino in the 1994 series)
- Tai Nguyen as Dr. Jack Tran (season 3, reprising his role from the 1994 series)
- William McKenna as Sebastian "Seb" Johnson, Noah's friend from rival school St. Bruno's (season 3)
- Ben Turland as Liam, the son of a carnival owner (season 3)
- Ioane Sa'ula as Noah, Amerie's boyfriend and a student at St. Bruno's (season 3)
- Aki Munroe as Taz, Principal Woodsy's niece and a student at Hartley High (season 3)
- Blazey Best as Jackie, a carnival owner (season 3)
- Jono Watts as Clancy, a carnival owner (season 3)

== Episodes ==
Series	Episodes	Originally released
1	8	14 September 2022
2	8	11 April 2024
3	8	25 March 2026

=== Season 1 (2022) ===
No. overall	No. in season	Title	Directed by	Written by	Original release date
1	1	"Map B**ch"	Gracie Otto	Hannah Carroll Chapman	14 September 2022
Amerie Wadia becomes a social pariah at Hartley High after the "incest map," a detailed diagram of which students have been sexually involved, is discovered and she is revealed as the culprit. Harper McLean, Amerie's longtime best friend and co-creator of the map, starts ignoring her and punches her when she tries to talk to her, but doesn't explain why. The last time Amerie and Harper were together was at a music festival the week before (which is shown repeatedly throughout the season as flashbacks). The students who appear on the map are placed in a mandatory sex education class headed by Principal Stacy "Woodsy" Woods and English teacher Josephine "Jojo" Obah as a result. Darren Rivers sleeps on the street after clashing with their stepfather over their non-binary identity and eventually seeks refuge at their father Peter's house. Quinn "Quinni" Gallagher-Jones and Darren befriend Amerie and take her to a party, where she kisses her crush, Dustin "Dusty" Reid. At the end of the episode, somebody is seen drawing a line between Dusty's and Harper's names, indicating that they had sex.
2	2	"Renaissance Titties"	Gracie Otto	Matthew Whittet & Hannah Carroll Chapman	14 September 2022
Dusty's band Renaissance Titties is having a show at his place, and Amerie is keen to attend. However, Spencer "Spider" White, a fellow student who deeply dislikes Amerie, is in charge of ticket sales and he refuses to sell one to her. Amerie gets help sneaking into the party from Malakai Mitchell, but in the process, accidentally falls into a swimming pool. At the show, Amerie discovers that Dusty and Harper are seeing each other, leaving her heartbroken. Quinni and Sasha go on a date, and Quinni experiences sensory overload, leading Sasha to believe she doesn't like her. Quinni explains she is autistic and mentions she is often good at masking it. The two make up and have their first kiss. Chook, Douglas "Ca$h" Piggott, Tilla and Jayden steal Dusty's dad's car. Chook is the ringleader of the group.
3	3	"Eetsway"	Neil Sharma	Marieke Hardy	14 September 2022
Chook and his crew, including Ca$h, steal Dusty's dad's car to thieve goods from a retail store. When the car doesn't start, the police pursue them to escape on foot. Chook tells Ca$h to hide the stolen goods so Ca$h asks Darren for help, and they spend time together. Ca$h's nan tells Ca$h to make new friends, and Darren's step dad tells Darren he thinks Ca$h is bad news. Dusty asks Amerie what Harper wants in a relationship and she gives him bad advice on purpose, which later backfires. Harper apologises to Amerie for sleeping with Dusty, and Amerie asks Harper what happened to their friendship but she refuses to tell her. Amerie later seeks solace in Malakai and they sleep together. It is Amerie's first time having sex.
4	4	"Rack Off"	Neil Sharma	Meyne Wyatt	14 September 2022
Malakai is teased by his classmates in the locker room about missing basketball tryouts to spend time with Amerie, and he unwillingly reveals intimate details about their encounter. Many of the students end up attending the same Mardi Gras event. Quinni feels alienated by Sasha spending so much time with Missy Beckett (Sasha's ex-girlfriend) and making choices on Quinni's behalf to keep her safe. Quinni tells her it's a shitty thing for anyone to be stood up (not just because she likes schedules) and that she can look after herself. Darren and Ca$h kiss for the first time at the event. Malakai is assaulted by a police officer, and Amerie records the incident and accidentally uploads it onto social media. Malakai becomes distressed, and he runs away from Amerie and her friends. Dusty and Harper follow him to offer their support, and they ultimately have a threesome together.
5	5	"Bin Chicken"	Adam Murfet & Jessie Oldfield	Thomas Wilson-White	14 September 2022
It's clean-up day at Hartley High with the person picking up the most rubbish receiving a prize. Someone anonymously reveals in SLT's class that Malakai, Dusty and Harper had a threesome together. Darren and Ca$h had planned to go on a date, but ultimately escort Ca$h's grandmother to a poker game with her friends. Dusty starts treating Harper differently after the threesome, and she angrily confronts him in front of the whole school. Amerie and Malakai also break up, as Malakai is struggling to cope with the trauma of his police brutality encounter and the subsequent embarrassment of the video circulating around social media.
6	6	"Angeline"	Adam Murfet & Jessie Oldfield	Natesha Somasundaram	14 September 2022
Quinni is excited to attend a book signing by her favourite author, Rhea Brown (Natalie Tran), whose books she has been reading for many years. Sasha accompanies Quinni to the event, but spontaneously meets up with a friend, disrupting Quinni's planned schedule. Later that night, Quinni tells Sasha she is too tired to attend Amerie's costume party with her, leading Sasha to angrily declare that Quinni is preventing her from being a "normal" teenager. Quinni leaves and has a meltdown, becoming non-verbal. Harper discovers that she has chlamydia, but is nervous to tell Dusty and Malakai. She stops Dusty and Amerie from having sex, in order to tell Dusty. Missy's brother saves an intoxicated Malakai from jumping off Amerie's roof, and Malakai stays with Missy's family all of next episode.
7	7	"The Sheriff"	Gracie Otto	Megan Palinkas & Matthew Whittet	14 September 2022
Jojo is anonymously accused of having a sexual relationship with Amerie, and the police conduct an investigation. Amerie and Jojo both deny the allegations and Jojo is eventually cleared of the charges, but she becomes distressed by the situation and decides to quit teaching. The students stage a protest, demanding that Jojo returns as their teacher. Ca$h tells Darren that he is asexual. It is revealed that on the night of the music festival, Amerie and Spider hooked up together, and also that Harper knocked on Amerie's window while Spider was in her room. Amerie pretended that she couldn't hear her as she doesn't want Harper to know she was with Spider. After the protest, Amerie walks home and sees an ambulance in front of Harper's house. Harper walks out of her front door covered in blood.
8	8	"Three of Swords"	Gracie Otto	Hannah Carroll Chapman	14 September 2022
Harper tells Amerie about the events on the day of the music festival. In the morning, Harper's father, Justin (Ben Oxenbould), becomes agitated and asks her for money (presumably for meth). She leaves her home and meets up with Amerie, and they cross paths with Chook and his crew. Harper and Amerie get split up at the festival, and Harper's phone runs out of battery. Intoxicated with alcohol, Harper recovers consciousness to find herself in Chook's car with his crew, including Ca$h. Chook implies that he will sexually assault her. They stop at a petrol station, and Ca$h unlocks the door, allowing Harper to escape. After attempting to stay at Amerie's place, Harper returns, where her father experiences meth-induced psychosis, and attacks her. She explains that her father experienced meth-induced psychosis yet again, and this time she stabbed him with a knife while defending herself (hence why she is covered in blood). Amerie is stunned at all of this information and apologises to Harper for ignoring her knocks on the window. The two girls make up and become friends again. Unknowingly to Chook, Ca$h sends Harper footage of a video taken while Harper was in the car (on the night of the festival), and they send it to the police. Chook's entire crew get arrested, excluding Chook. Ca$h declares his love to Darren before being taken into custody by the police. Because he avoided arrest, Harper and Amerie vandalise and set fire to Chook's car.

=== Season 2 (2024) ===
No. overall	No. in season	Title	Directed by	Written by	Original release date
9	1	"Bird Psycho"	Gracie Otto	Hannah Carroll Chapman	11 April 2024
Amerie has become protective of Harper. While school photos are being taken, the students are introduced to a new sports teacher, Timothy Voss, and a new student, Rowan Callaghan. Rowan develops a friendship with Malakai. Mr. Voss is unimpressed by the SLT class. During SLTs, Spider voices his hate for the class and convinces all of the cisgender boys to leave, who form a new group called "The Cumlords" under Mr. Voss. Amerie and Malakai have sex in the stairwell, but Amerie states that Harper is her priority. Later, a dead ibis is found on Harper's bag, the first act of a culprit dubbed "Bird Psycho." Amerie, Quinni, and Darren confront Chook at his house but learn that it isn't him. Chook keeps Darren behind to tell them that Ca$h was aware of Harper's kidnapping, and Darren begins to lose trust in Ca$h. At a party, Amerie and Quinni decipher that Bird Psycho isn't Spider, as he is deathly afraid of birds. Harper tells Amerie to stop worrying about her, so Amerie becomes a candidate for school captain along with Sasha and Spider, and tells Malakai that she has more time for their relationship. Eliminated suspects: Spider and Chook.
10	2	"SLTs vs C**LORDs"	Gracie Otto	Marieke Hardy	11 April 2024
Bird Psycho creates an online forum to bully Amerie, causing tension. Quinni suspects Sasha but finds she is innocent. The Cumlords clash with the SLTs over field use, resolved with an AFL game, won by the SLTs. Spider begins to see Missy in a new light. Harper feels overwhelmed and wants to drop the case, which Amerie supports. Ca$h's grandmother convinces Darren to reconcile with Ca$h. Chook reassures Ca$h of their bond and continues his attempts to get in contact with him. Malakai realises he may be bisexual, which he had previously discussed with Missy. Amerie wants to date Malakai again, so the two go to an escape room and are joined by Rowan. Rowan tells Malakai he's bisexual. At Amerie's house, Malakai refuses any sexual activity, leading to an argument. Later, he unexpectedly meets Rowan at his work, indicating potential attraction. Eliminated suspects: Spider, Chook, and Sasha.
11	3	"The Feelings Pit"	Gracie Otto	Jean Tong	11 April 2024
The Cumlords create a "feelings pit" to bury their emotions. Rowan confides in Malakai about feeling confused after spending time together. Malakai admits he may still have feelings for Amerie and discusses his sexuality with Darren, who advises honesty. Quinni continues to investigate the identity of Bird Psycho. During a fundraising event, there is competitive tension between Spider and Missy. Later, Missy fantasises about Spider in a sex dream. Amerie suspects Malakai's sexuality and digs up the "feelings pit" with Quinni to gain clarity. Malakai opens up and engages in a sexual encounter with Rowan. Woodsy tells Ca$h he cannot return to school, prompting Darren's concern. However, Harper convinces Woodsy, who is giving her driving lessons, to let Ca$h come back. Bird Psycho digs up and displays all of the boys secrets from the feelings pit, framing Amerie for the act. Eliminated suspects: Spider, Chook, Sasha, and Anthony.
12	4	"Legs Open Hearts Broken"	Neil Sharma	Thomas Wilson-White	11 April 2024
The students go to camp, and Quinni records her, Amerie, and Harper discussing Bird Psycho with her phone. While playing "Never have I ever" Darren gets jealous of Ca$h's previous sexual encounters, which they later discuss. The next day, Bird Psycho steals Quinni's phone and loudly plays the voice recording to frame Amerie. Mr. Voss, annoyed with the gossip, leads the students blindfolded into the woods and leaves them to find their way back. Everyone except Quinni gets high on mushrooms. Quinni takes this opportunity to investigate Zoe as a potential Bird Psycho suspect, however she confesses to stealing Amerie's vibrator and betraying her Puritan beliefs, but reassures them she is not Bird Psycho. While high, Spider and Missy flirt and have oral sex, and Malakai mistakes Rowan for Amerie, upsetting Rowan. Obah admonishes Voss for abandoning the kids, and sets out to find them, calling help. The following morning, while looking for her phone, Quinni gets bitten by a snake. The other students put their differences aside to get her to help and safety. Eliminated suspects: Spider, Chook, Sasha, Anthony, and Zoe.
13	5	"The Demon King"	Neil Sharma	Sara Khan	11 April 2024
Quinni rests at home after the snake bite, but she continues investigating Bird Psycho; Amerie and Darren make her take a break from her new interest by taking her to Taronga Zoo. This makes her feel worse as they mention changes that Quinni missed out on, such as Harper moving in with Ca$h and Darren, and Amerie making a campaign video with Rowan. Quinni expresses her frustration to Darren and decides to stop masking for others. Missy goes to Spider's house in a bodysuit as she is not sure why she always receives oral sex but he never wants her to return it, leaving her concerned he may not be interested in her. She is surprised by Spider's mother Cait, who spends their lunch together expressing her hatred of men. In Spider's room, Missy learns that he "can't get it up" but agrees to still pursue something with him. After breaking up with Malakai, Rowan invites Amerie over to work on the campaign video. After she leaves, Quinni's old phone is seen in his drawer, revealing he is Bird Psycho.
14	6	"Just Kid $h*t"	Jessie Oldfield & Adam Murfet	Keir Wilkins	11 April 2024
Ca$h, Darren, and Harper plan a housewarming party, but Ca$h instead does a final job with Chook. At the party, Darren wants Quinni's support as they're upset that Ca$h is late, but she chooses not to help. During the job with Chook, the boat's engine stops working and Ca$h and Chook talk about their perspectives of each other, Ca$h officially and permanently cuts ties with Chook. Malakai has a week to decide if he will move with his mother to Geneva before the school formal, and Missy tells him to stay. Spider no longer wants to keep his relationship a secret and talks to Missy about it. Amerie thanks Rowan for the video and asks him out. They go to a skate park, and Rowan says he doesn't think people will change until they're taught a lesson. He gets upset and suddenly leaves. He later apologises at the party. Amerie believes she wouldn't have known all the bad things she did if it wasn't for Bird Psycho, and the two kiss. Darren is devastated to find that Ca$h has been out with Chook and leaves the party. They go looking to find Jacob, an old friend, but instead finds Dusty.
15	7	"The Grapes of Voss"	Neil Sharma	Megan Palinkas	11 April 2024
After realising she has not had her period, Amerie buys an abortion pill and tries to tell Malakai. Amerie tells Rowan they can't meet, then sends him an intimate photo. At school, Spider tells Sasha he is no longer running for school captain, and Sasha confronts Missy about seeing him. Missy tells Spider that he shouldn't drop out to impress her. Amerie experiences extreme stomach cramps from the abortion, and Malakai and Harper spend the day with her. Meanwhile, Sasha and Spider participate in a captaincy debate, but Quinni (stepping in for Amerie) points out that neither actually care about the students, gaining support from the school body. Ca$h confirms with Dusty that he and Darren did not hook up. The next day, Quinni (who was not a candidate) is revealed to have won school captain, resulting in a food fight. Woodsy fires Mr. Voss for his improper behaviour. Ca$h breaks up with Darren as he can't give them what they want, prompting Darren to join the sex abstinent Puriteens. Sasha finds print-outs of Amerie's intimate photo in the dumpster, and Rowan harasses Malakai on the way home, telling him he has a history with Amerie and to stay away from her.
16	8	"Boys Don't Cry"	Jessie Oldfield & Adam Murfet	Hannah Carroll Chapman	11 April 2024
Amerie, Rowan, and Harper help decorate the hall for the upcoming formal. Malakai warns Harper about Rowan, but she tells him to stay out of Amerie's life, and he writes a goodbye letter and leaves for Switzerland. Sasha shows Quinni the print-outs, and they analyze all their evidence and realise Bird Psycho is Rowan. Harper tells Amerie about Malakai's true feelings, making Amerie upset and confess that she loves Malakai back; Rowan overhears and is distraught. The CUMLORDS (excluding Spider) wave flaming torches around in protest, and Mr. Voss unintentionally sets fire to the school; the students in the burning hall escape. Meanwhile, Amerie and Harper have been locked in an AV club room as Rowan shows them his sand animation film, depicting his previous interactions with Amerie: When they were younger, they bonded over taking care of a bird, but when it died, the other kids made fun of them for giving it a funeral. Amerie told them it was his idea, causing him to run home and get violently angry. His brother Jett ran to get their parents' help across the road but got hit by a car and died (revealing that he has been hallucinating his brother all along). Quinni arrives and runs in to save Amerie and Harper. Amerie goes back to save a distraught Rowan, who now thinks he is responsible for his brother's death. Mr. Voss is arrested, while the students make up with each other and dance while Hartley High burns.

=== Season 3 (2026) ===
No. overall	No. in season	Title	Directed by	Written by	Original release date
17	1	"Operation Headjob"	Jessie Oldfield & Adam Murfet	Megan Palinkas	25 March 2026
As graduation approaches, the students enter their final weeks at Hartley High. Quinni records interviews for a graduation video as they celebrate Muck-Up Day. Students from rival school St. Bruno's steal Hartley's ibis mascot head, and Noah tells Amerie that his friend Seb was behind the prank. After Seb refuses to reveal where he has hidden it, Amerie and her friends retaliate by stealing a bust from St. Bruno's and plan to place it on a carnival ride where Harper works. At the carnival, Amerie unexpectedly reunites with Malakai, who has returned from Switzerland, and learns that he left her a letter before departing that was destroyed in the school fire before she could read it. Malakai joins the group as they attempt to attach the bust to a ride, which someone suddenly activates. Malakai dislocates his shoulder while escaping, and Clancy, one of the carnival's owners, is seriously injured and left unconscious. The group panic and flee.
18	2	"Somebody Nose"	Jessie Oldfield & Adam Murfet	Keir Wilkins	25 March 2026
At Uni Day, a sleep-deprived Amerie becomes increasingly consumed by guilt over the carnival incident and begins hallucinating St. Bruno, while Ca$h urges the group to behave normally. They learn that St. Bruno's is searching for its missing bust and intends to involve the police. Amerie and Harper return to the carnival and recover the bust's missing nose before visiting the hospital, where Harper learns that Clancy is in a coma. Amerie visits Malakai, who tells her that her presence brings chaos into his life and that he was happier away from Hartley. Meanwhile, Quinni meets Woodsy's niece Taz, who has secretly converted the school's sensory room into a space where students pay to have sex. Sasha bonds with Taz after they are placed in detention together, while Darren becomes discouraged after receiving harsh criticism of their acting. Malakai is told he must remain in Australia while his shoulder heals. Harper later learns that evidence suggests the carnival ride was deliberately activated.
19	3	"The Root Room"	Tig Terera	Hannah Samuel	25 March 2026
Amerie and Harper become increasingly suspicious that someone within their group deliberately activated the carnival ride and begin investigating their friends. Quinni discovers that Taz has been using the sensory room for hookups and catches her with Sasha. When the matter reaches Woodsy, Quinni argues that Taz's behaviour is connected to the trauma of losing her mother. At Missy's birthday party, the group's suspicions turn towards her and an argument erupts after they accuse her of activating the ride. Hurt by the accusation, Missy turns on the group and later tells Sasha about the stolen bust and carnival prank. The following morning, Harper learns that an investigation found Clancy had been intoxicated and had breached safety regulations, temporarily easing fears that the students will be blamed for his injuries. Taz subsequently exposes Quinni as the anonymous author of Velvet Thrones, jeopardising Quinni's university plans and resulting in the rejection of her scholarship application.
20	4	"A Constitution for Cucking"	Tig Terera	Jessica Paine	25 March 2026
Quinni is bullied after being exposed as the author of Velvet Thrones. Believing they are no longer at risk over the carnival incident, the group plan to attend a secret concert by Genesis Owusu. Amerie obtains a fake ID, but after Malakai accidentally throws it away, the pair spend the day replacing it and their unresolved feelings resurface. When Noah cancels on Amerie, she invites Malakai to the concert instead. Harper grows closer to Liam, while Missy and Spider attempt to establish the rules of a "hall pass" arrangement. Spider admits that he is uncomfortable with the arrangement, while Quinni and Taz grow closer over their shared interests. At the concert, Amerie and Malakai nearly kiss, but Amerie pulls away and leaves to find Harper, leading to an argument between the two friends. Missy and Malakai, both intoxicated, unexpectedly kiss and immediately regret it, only to discover that the rest of their friends witnessed the encounter.
21	5	"A Good Egg"	Nina Buxton	Thomas Wilson-White	25 March 2026
The group deal with the fallout from Missy and Malakai's kiss and Amerie and Harper's argument. Jackie discovers a torn piece of Amerie's Hartley jacket at the carnival and confronts Woodsy, who orders the Year 12 students to bring their jackets to school. Amerie removes the sleeves from hers and denies involvement in the carnival incident, forcing Harper to support her story despite becoming increasingly frustrated with her. Darren continues struggling with acting until Ca$h challenges them to be honest about what they want. Darren performs at the school arts showcase and tells Ca$h that they want to pursue acting in New York, asking him to come with them. Malakai finally tells Amerie what he wrote in his lost letter, but she chooses to remain with Noah. A confrontation involving Noah, Malakai, Missy and Spider erupts into a fight. Afterwards, Malakai tells Woodsy the truth about the carnival prank. Amerie then remembers seeing Seb's distinctive car at the carnival, leading her and Harper to suspect that he activated the ride.
22	6	"Cuckoo, B****es!"	Nina Buxton	Thomas Weatherall & Jessica Paine	25 March 2026
Amerie and Harper organise a "cuckoo" party at Seb's house so the group can search for evidence that he was present at the carnival. Woodsy and Obah debate whether to report the students, while Ca$h admits to Nan that he is frightened about moving to New York with Darren. Malakai, struggling with his return to Australia, asks Ca$h to give him a tattoo. During the party, Seb catches Amerie and Harper searching his house and directs them to Noah. Noah admits that he and Seb were at the carnival watching Amerie and Malakai but denies activating the ride. Missy and Spider acknowledge that their relationship is no longer working and break up. Taz realises that she has feelings for Quinni and the pair kiss, but Sasha reveals that Taz was responsible for exposing Quinni as the author of Velvet Thrones, causing Quinni to reject her. Taz later confronts Woodsy over feeling abandoned following her mother's death. After Malakai urges Woodsy to allow the students to take responsibility for their actions, Woodsy gives the group one final opportunity to confess before expelling them when they refuse.
23	7	"For Whom the Hartley Bell Tolls"	Jessie Oldfield & Adam Murfet	Sarah Emery	25 March 2026
After being expelled, the students are questioned by police about the carnival incident and become angry with Malakai for telling Woodsy the truth. They attend graduation to support Ca$h, Zoe, Sasha and their other classmates, while Amerie obtains Seb's dashcam footage from the night of the accident. During a final SLT session, Sasha admits that she has felt excluded by the group and apologises for her behaviour. Ca$h becomes frightened when he briefly believes Nan has died in her sleep, causing him to reconsider his plans to move to New York with Darren. Taz and Woodsy reconcile after discussing the death of Taz's mother and Woodsy's absence following her funeral. Harper tells Liam that she was involved in the carnival incident and the pair sleep together. Seb's footage appears to implicate Liam, who is subsequently arrested. The charges against the Hartley students are dropped, allowing them to sit their final exams. Taz then attempts to make amends with Quinni by giving her a bound, illustrated copy of Velvet Thrones, but Quinni refuses to forgive her. As the group prepares for Schoolies, Harper asks Amerie to join her on a road trip. Amerie then notices Sasha's brother wearing the same type of mask seen in the footage and learns that it came from Sasha, leading her to suspect that Sasha activated the ride.
24	8	"Destined"	Jessie Oldfield & Adam Murfet	Hannah Carroll Chapman	25 March 2026
At Schoolies, the group attend a final boat party together. Amerie confronts Sasha, who admits that she activated the carnival ride after discovering that the others had excluded her from their plans. Sasha subsequently falls overboard, and Amerie and Malakai rescue her. Amerie breaks up with Noah and decides to take responsibility for the incident herself, but arrives at the police station to discover that Sasha has already confessed. Harper visits Liam and discovers that Clancy has recovered, although Jackie remains hostile towards her. Back at Hartley, Woodsy and Obah hold an informal graduation ceremony in which the students bury a time capsule. Amerie returns to the wall where the original sex map was discovered and writes that she and Harper are "destined", before agreeing to join Harper on her road trip. Malakai considers remaining in Australia, and he and Amerie confess that they love each other, with Malakai promising to wait for her. The students begin their lives after Hartley: Spider begins coaching basketball, Ant becomes a plumber, Sasha undertakes community service and Missy is drafted by the Sydney Swans in the AFLW. Quinni and Taz reconcile and begin a relationship, while Quinni is shown working on the manuscript for Velvet Thrones, with pages spread across the floor. Darren moves to New York to pursue acting while remaining in a relationship with Ca$h. Ca$h is later shown getting into a taxi with a backpack, although his destination is not revealed, while Malakai is shown swimming calmly in the ocean. Amerie and Harper leave together on their road trip.

== Production ==
The series was announced by Netflix in December 2020. Filming for the first season took place between November 2021 and February 2022, primarily at South Sydney High School, with additional filming in Maroubra and Matraville, New South Wales.

A second season was announced on 19 October 2022. Production began on 28 May 2023 and concluded on 29 August 2023. The second season premiered on 11 April 2024.

A third and final season was announced on 9 May 2024. Filming began on 4 November 2024 and wrapped on 6 February 2025. The final season premiered on 25 March 2026.

== Release ==
The first season premiered on 14 September 2022. The second season premiered on 11 April 2024. The third season premiered on 25 March 2026.

== Reception ==
=== Audience viewership ===
The first season of Heartbreak High debuted at number six on Netflix's Top 10 TV English titles for the tracking week of 19–25 September 2022 with 18.25 million hours viewed. On the following week, it climbed to number five and garnered 14.88 million viewing hours. The series remained in the top 10 for the third week, placing at number eight with 9.48 million viewing hours.

The second season debuted at number seven on Netflix's Top 10 TV English titles for the tracking week of 8–14 April 2024 with 15.8 million hours viewed. On the following week, it climbed to number five and garnered 20 million viewing hours. On its third week, it ranked at number nine, earning 12 million viewing hours.

The third season debuted at number one on Netflix's Australian and New Zealand Top 10 English TV lists. In Netflix's global English-language television chart for 23–29 March 2026, it ranked ninth, recording 2.4 million views and 15.1 million hours viewed following its 25 March release. During the first half of 2026, the season accumulated 6.9 million views and 43.5 million hours viewed globally. IF Magazine reported that Heartbreak High season three was the most-watched Netflix ANZ Original during the first half of 2026.

=== Critical response ===
The review aggregator website Rotten Tomatoes gave the first season an approval rating of 100%, based on reviews from ten critics. The second season has an approval rating of 57%, based on reviews from seven critics. The third season has an approval rating of 100%, based on reviews from five critics. Kylie Northover of The Age and Anthony Morris of ScreenHub each awarded the third season four stars out of five.

The series received praise for its representation of race, sexuality, gender and neurodivergence, as well as its depiction of contemporary teenage life and visual style. ABC News described the series as a global success, highlighting its diverse cast, thoughtful storylines and authentic representation. Teen Vogue included Heartbreak High among its best Netflix series of 2022, describing it as an unabashedly queer, character-driven drama that understood the emotional stakes of adolescence.

Alex Henderson of The Conversation praised the series' blend of comedy and drama and its treatment of serious subjects including substance abuse, discrimination and youth crime, while noting that it avoided clichéd storytelling. Mitchell Adams of The Sydney Morning Herald praised its representation of autism, describing it as the best autism representation he had seen. The third season also drew praise, with Laura Moreno of the Bay Area Reporter highlighting its visual style, humour and contemporary storylines.

=== Accolades ===
Award	Year	Category	Nominated work	Result	Ref.
AACTA Awards	2022	Best Drama Series	Heartbreak High	Nominated	
AACTA Awards	2022	Best Lead Actor in Drama	James Majoos	Nominated	
AACTA Awards	2022	Best Supporting Actor in Drama	Thomas Weatherall	Won	
AACTA Awards	2022	Best Direction in Drama or Comedy	Gracie Otto	Nominated	
AACTA Awards	2022	Best Screenplay in Television	Hannah Carroll Chapman (for "Map Bitch")	Won	
AACTA Awards	2022	Best Cinematography in Television	Simon Ozolins (for "Map Bitch")	Nominated	
AACTA Awards	2022	Best Costume Design in Television	Rita Carmody (for "Map Bitch")	Won	
AACTA Awards	2022	Best Production Design in Television	Marni Kornhauser (for "Map Bitch")	Nominated	
AACTA Awards	2022	Best Casting	Amanda Mitchell	Nominated	
AACTA Awards	2022	Audience Choice Award for Best Television Series	Heartbreak High	Won	
AACTA Awards	2022	Audience Choice Award for Best Actor	Bryn Chapman-Parish	Won	
AACTA Awards	2022	Audience Choice Award for Best Actor	Thomas Weatherall	Nominated	
AACTA Awards	2022	Audience Choice Award for Best Actress	Chloé Hayden	Won	
AACTA Awards	2022	Audience Choice Award for Best Actress	Ayesha Madon	Nominated	
AACTA Awards	2022	Audience Choice Award for Best Actress	Asher Yasbincek	Nominated	
AACTA Awards	2025	Best Drama Series	Heartbreak High	Won	
AACTA Awards	2025	Best Supporting Actress in Drama	Asher Yasbincek	Nominated	
AACTA Awards	2025	Best Costume Design in Television	Rita Carmody (for "Bird Psycho")	Nominated	
AACTA Awards	2025	Best Soundtrack	Jemma Burns	Won	
AACTA Awards	2025	Audience Choice Award for Favourite Television Show	Heartbreak High	Nominated	
AACTA International Awards	2023	Best Drama Series	Heartbreak High	Nominated	
AACTA International Awards	2023	Best Actor in a Series	Thomas Weatherall	Nominated	
Australian Cinematographers Society Awards	2023	NSW & ACT Awards – Serial TV & Comedy Series (Gold)	Drew English (for Season 1, Episode 8)	Won	
Australian Cinematographers Society Awards	2024	NSW & ACT Awards – Serial TV & Comedy Series (Gold)	Drew English (for Season 2, Episode 8)	Won	
Australian Cinematographers Society Awards	2025	National Awards – Serial TV & Comedy Series (Gold Tripod)	Drew English (for Season 2, Episode 8)	Won	
Australian Cinematographers Society Awards	2025	NSW Awards – Second Unit Cinematography (Bronze)	Josh Flavell ACS (for Season 2, Episode 4)	Won	
Australian Cinematographers Society Awards	2026	NSW & ACT Awards – Serial TV & Comedy Series (Gold)	Drew English ACS (for Season 3, Episode 8)	Won	
Australian Directors' Guild Awards	2023	Best Direction in a TV or SVOD Drama Series Episode	Gracie Otto (for Season 1, Episode 8)	Nominated	
Australian Directors' Guild Awards	2024	Best Direction of a Drama Series Episode	Adam Murfet and Jessie Oldfield (for "Boys Don't Cry")	Nominated	
Australian Production Design Guild Awards	2023	Costume Design for a Television Production	Rita Carmody, Emma Russell, Genevieve Graham and Jasmine Christie	Won	
Australian Screen Editors Awards	2023	Best Editing in Drama	Ariel Shaw (for Season 1, Episode 1)	Nominated	
AWGIE Awards	2022	Best Screenplay, Television – Series	Hannah Carroll Chapman (for "Map B**ch")	Nominated	
AWGIE Awards	2025	Best Screenplay, Television – Series	Megan Palinkas (for "The Grapes of Voss")	Nominated	
Casting Guild of Australia Awards	2022	Best Casting in a TV Drama	Amanda Mitchell	Won	
GLAAD Media Awards	2023	Outstanding New TV Series	Heartbreak High	Nominated	
GLAAD Media Awards	2025	Outstanding Drama Series	Heartbreak High	Nominated	
International Emmy Awards	2023	Kids: Live-Action	Heartbreak High	Won	
Logie Awards	2023	Most Popular Drama Series, Miniseries or Telemovie	Heartbreak High	Nominated	
Logie Awards	2023	Most Popular New Talent	Chloé Hayden	Nominated	
Logie Awards	2023	Most Popular New Talent	Ayesha Madon	Nominated	
Logie Awards	2023	Most Outstanding Supporting Actor	Thomas Weatherall	Won	
Logie Awards	2025	Best Drama Program	Heartbreak High	Nominated	
Logie Awards	2025	Best Lead Actress in a Drama	Ayesha Madon	Nominated	
Logie Awards	2025	Best Supporting Actress in a Drama	Chloé Hayden	Nominated	
Logie Awards	2026	Best Drama Program	Heartbreak High	Nominated	
Logie Awards	2026	Best Supporting Actor in a Drama	Thomas Weatherall	Nominated	
Mona Brand Awards	2024	Early Career Writer Award	Hannah Carroll Chapman (for Heartbreak High)	Won	
New South Wales Premier's Literary Awards	2025	Betty Roland Prize for Scriptwriting	Hannah Carroll Chapman (for "Boys Don't Cry")	Shortlisted	
Screen Producers Australia Awards	2023	Drama Series Production of the Year	Heartbreak High – Fremantle Australia	Won	
Screen Producers Australia Awards	2025	Drama Series Production of the Year	Heartbreak High (Season 2) – Fremantle Australia	Nominated	
