= Sam Pang Tonight =

Australian talk show

- Genre: Talk show; Variety show
- Written by: Sophie Braham; Sonia Di Iorio; Tim McDonald; John Origlasso; Sam Pang; Dean Thomas; Adam White
- Directed by: Mark Horpinitch
- Presented by: Sam Pang
- No. of seasons: 3
- No. of episodes: 21

Production
- Executive producers: Sam Pang; John Origlasso
- Producers: Adam White; Joe Simon
- Production location: Melbourne
- Running time: 60 minutes (inc. ads)
- Production company: One Wolf Productions

Original release
- Network: Network 10
- Release: 17 March 2025 – present

Sam Pang Tonight is an Australian talk show hosted by comedian Sam Pang that airs on Network 10. The series premiered on 17 March 2025. In April 2025, the series was renewed for a second season. A third season premiered on 19 October 2026.

== Production ==
The series was first announced in September 2024, during Paramount/Network 10’s 2025 upfronts, where it was known only as “Untitled Sam Pang Project”. The second season, which consisted of eight episodes, aired and was filmed live between 13 October to 1 December 2025. The third season, again consisting of eight episodes, premiered on 19 October and will be filmed over eight weeks; however, unlike the previous seasons, episodes will be filmed on Sundays and will air on Mondays, rather than being filmed and aired on the same day.

== Episodes ==
=== Series overview ===
Season	Episodes	Originally released		
Season	Episodes	First released	Last released	Network
1	8	17 March 2025	5 May 2025	Network 10
2	8	13 October 2025	1 December 2025	Network 10
3	8	19 October 2026	TBA	Network 10

=== Season 1 (2025) ===
No. overall	No. in season	Guests	Guest announcer	Original release date	Australian viewers
1	1	Jack Thompson, Dr Emma West	Dave Thornton	17 March 2025	799,000
2	2	Kitty Flanagan, Felix Cameron	Kitty Flanagan	24 March 2025	575,000
3	3	Urzila Carlson, Shane White	Guy Montgomery	31 March 2025	467,000
4	4	Tim Minchin, Samantha Maiden	Anne Edmonds	7 April 2025	384,000
5	5	John Safran, Matt Moran	Becky Lucas	14 April 2025	405,000
6	6	Kate Langbroek, Nath Valvo, Eddie Perfect	Tony Martin	21 April 2025	326,000
7	7	Glenn Robbins, Tony Armstrong, Courtney Act	Luke McGregor	28 April 2025	499,000
8	8	Tom Gleisner, Dave Thornton	Tom Cashman	5 May 2025	522,000

=== Season 2 (2025) ===
No. overall	No. in season	Guests	Guest announcer	Original release date	Australian viewers
9	1	Rosie O'Donnell, Joel Kim Booster	Ray O'Leary	13 October 2025	478,000
10	2	Russell Crowe, Rachel Griffiths	Sam Campbell	20 October 2025	505,000
11	3	5SOS, John Edward	Denise Scott	27 October 2025	449,000
12	4	Michael Weatherly	Shaun Micallef	3 November 2025	426,000
13	5	Eddie Izzard, Lord Ian Botham	Lawrence Mooney	10 November 2025	450,000
14	6	Angus Sampson, Harriet Dyer	Celia Pacquola	17 November 2025	438,000
15	7	Priscilla Presley, Alan Davies	Tony Martin	24 November 2025	426,000
16	8	Melanie C, Claudia Karvan, Tom Cashman	Becky Lucas	1 December 2025	407,000

=== Season 3 (2026) ===
No. overall	No. in season	Guests	Guest announcer	Original release date	Australian viewers
17	1	Poh Ling Yeow	Kitty Flanagan	19 October 2026	428,000
18	2	Pia Miranda, Aaron Chen	Broden Kelly	26 October 2026	390,000
19	3	Kartanya Maynard, Jai Courtney	Dara Ó Briain	2 November 2026	311,000
20	4	Stephen Curry, Amy Shark, Colin Hay	Tony Martin	9 November 2026	374,000
21	5	Sarah Snook, Usman Khawaja	Dave Lawson	16 November 2026	329,000

== Awards ==
Year	Award	Category	Result	Ref.
2025	TV Week Logie Awards	Best Comedy Entertainment Program	Nominated	

== See also ==
- List of Australian television series
