= Ayesha Madon =

Australian actor and musician (born 1998)

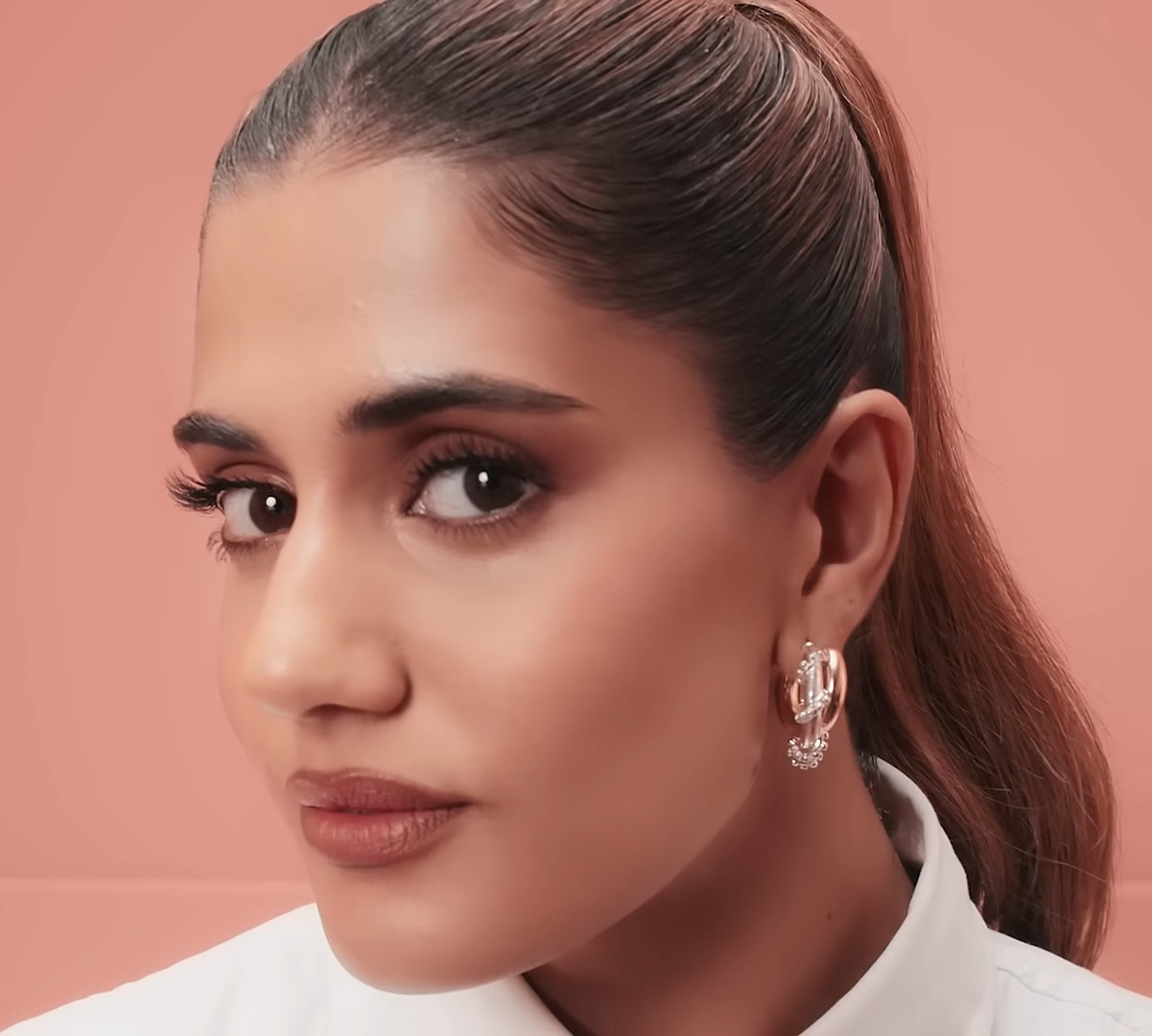
- Madon in 2026
- Born: 10 February 1998 (age 28); Sydney, New South Wales, Australia
- Education: The McDonald College; Victorian College of the Arts
- Occupations: Actress; singer-songwriter; musician
- Years active: 2019–present
- Musical career
- Genres: Alternative pop; pop; R&B
- Instruments: Vocals; piano
- Label: Future Classic

Ayesha Madon (born 10 February 1998) is an Australian actress, singer-songwriter, and musician. She is best known for her role as Amerie Wadia in the Netflix comedy drama series Heartbreak High (2022–2026), for which she has received nominations for an AACTA Award and a Logie Award.

== Early life ==
Madon was born and raised in Sydney, New South Wales. Her parents are emigrants from India who purchased a catering company after they arrived in Australia. Madon was raised in a Zoroastrian household but identifies as agnostic. She attended the McDonald College and the Victorian College of the Arts, graduating from the latter in 2018 with a degree in musical theatre.

== Career ==
Madon made her acting debut in 2021 featuring on some episodes of the sketch comedy series The Moth Effect. She had her breakthrough playing Amerie Wadia in the Netflix comedy drama series Heartbreak High (2022–2026), a reboot of the 1990s series of the same name. The series received critical acclaim and won an International Emmy Award, while Madon's performance earned nominations for the AACTA Audience Choice Award for Best Actress and the Logie Award for Most Popular New Talent.

In 2023, Madon appeared in an episode of the television series Love Me, in the role of Sienna.

The following year, she released her singles "Eulogy", "Blame Me" and "Michelle Obama", the former of which was one of the 5 most played songs on Australian radio Triple J.

== Personal life ==
Madon was diagnosed with attention deficit hyperactivity disorder (ADHD) after her therapist sought an assessment. Madon publicly came out as bisexual in July 2024. She identifies as Parsi.

== Discography ==
=== Extended plays ===
List of extended plays, with release date, formats, and label shown
Title	EP details
The Unanticipated Prequel	Released: 9 September 2025; Label: Future Classic; Format: Digital download, streaming

=== Singles ===
==== As lead artist ====
List of singles as lead artist, with title, year, and album details shown
Title	Year	Album
"Outside of the Party"	2020	Non-album singles
"Goldfish"	2022	Non-album singles
"Fish and Chips"	2022	Non-album singles
"Eulogy"	2024	The Unanticipated Prequel
"Blame Me"	2024	The Unanticipated Prequel
"Michelle Obama"	2024	The Unanticipated Prequel
"Jenga"	2025	The Unanticipated Prequel

==== As featured artist ====
List of singles as featured artist, with title, year, and album details shown
Title	Year	Album
"Ribena" (Kye featuring Ayesha Madon)	2023	Non-album single

== Filmography ==
List of film appearances, with year released, title, role, and notes shown
Year(s)	Title	Role	Notes
2021	The Moth Effect	Multiple roles	3 episodes
2022—2026	Heartbreak High	Amerie Wadia	Main character; seasons 1–3
2023	Love Me	Sienna	1 episode

=== Theatre ===
List of theatre appearances, with year released, title, role(s), theatre name, director, notes, and reference shown
Year(s)	Title	Role(s)	Theatre	Director	Notes	Ref.
2019—2021	Fangirls	Lily and others	National tour	Yve Blake	With Heartbreak High co-stars James Majoos and Chika Ikogwe	

== Awards and nominations ==
List of awards and nominations, with year released, category, result and references shown
Award	Year	Category	Result	Ref.
AACTA Awards	2022	Audience Choice Award for Best Actress	Nominated	
Logie Awards	2023	Graham Kennedy Award for Most Popular New Talent	Nominated	
Logie Awards	2025	Best Lead Actress in a Drama	Nominated	
