= 12th AACTA Awards =

Australian film and television awards ceremony

- Sponsored by: Foxtel
- Date: 5 December 2022 (industry luncheon); 7 December 2022 (main ceremony)
- Location: Hordern Pavilion, Sydney, New South Wales, Australia
- Hosted by: Amanda Keller; Rove McManus

Highlights
- Most awards: Elvis
- Most nominations: Elvis; Mystery Road: Origin
- Best Film: Elvis
- Best Drama Series: Mystery Road: Origin
- Best Comedy Series: Shaun Micallef's Mad as Hell

Television/radio coverage
- Networks
- Fox Docos; Network 10
- Produced by: Craig Campbell

The 12th Australian Academy of Cinema and Television Arts Awards (generally known as the AACTA Awards) was an awards ceremony to celebrate the best of Australian films and television of 2022. The main ceremony occurred on 7 December 2022 at the Hordern Pavilion in Sydney and was broadcast on Network 10 and Fox Arena. The recipient of the Longford Lyell Award was costume, production and set designer Catherine Martin. The recipient of the Trailblazer Award was actor Chris Hemsworth.

== Feature film ==
The nominations are as follows:

Best Film: Elvis — Baz Luhrmann, Catherine Martin, Gail Berman, Patrick McCormick, Schuyler Weiss; Here Out West — Sheila Jayadev, Annabel Davis, Bree-Anne Sykes; Sissy — Lisa Shaunessy, John De Margheriti, Jason Taylor, Bec Janek; The Drover's Wife — Bain Stewart, David Jowsey, Angela Littlejohn, Greer Simpkin, Leah Purcell; The Stranger — Rachel Gardner, Emile Sherman, Iain Canning, Joel Edgerton, Kerry Kohansky-Roberts, Kim Hodgert; Three Thousand Years of Longing — Doug Mitchell, George Miller	Best Indie Film: A Stitch In Time — Sasha Hadden; Akoni — Genna Chanelle Hayes; Darklands — Scott Major, Sarah Mayberry, Christopher Gist, Shane Isheev; Lonesome — Craig Boreham, Ben Ferris, Dean Francis, Ulysses Oliver; Pieces — Martin Wilson, Nicole Ferraro, Ryan Hodgson, Melissa Kelly; Smoke Between Trees — Michael Joy, Mieke van Opstal
Best Direction: Baz Luhrmann – Elvis; Hannah Barlow, Kane Senes – Sissy; Leah Purcell – The Drover's Wife; Thomas M. Wright – The Stranger; George Miller – Three Thousand Years of Longing	Best Screenplay in Film: Thomas Wright – The Stranger; Baz Luhrmann, Sam Bromell, Craig Pearce, Jeremy Doner – Elvis; Jackie van Beek – Nude Tuesday; Leah Purcell – The Drover's Wife; George Miller, Augusta Gore – Three Thousand Years of Longing
Best Lead Actor: Austin Butler – Elvis; Rob Collins – The Drover’s Wife; Joel Edgerton – The Stranger; Idris Elba – Three Thousand Years of Longing; Damon Herriman – Nude Tuesday	Best Lead Actress: Leah Purcell – The Drover’s Wife; Aisha Dee – Sissy; Julia Savage – Blaze; Tilda Swinton – Three Thousand Years of Longing; Jackie van Beek – Nude Tuesday
Best Supporting Actor: Sean Harris – The Stranger; Simon Baker – Blaze; Jemaine Clement – Nude Tuesday; Malachi Dower-Roberts – The Drover’s Wife; Tom Hanks – Elvis	Best Supporting Actress: Olivia DeJonge – Elvis; Jada Alberts – The Stranger; Jessica De Gouw – The Drover’s Wife; Joanna Lumley – Falling for Figaro; Yael Stone – Blaze
Best Cinematography: Mandy Walker – Elvis; Jeremy Rouse – Blaze; Mark Wareham – The Drover's Wife; Sam Chiplin – The Stranger; John Seale – Three Thousand Years of Longing	Best Editing: Matt Villa, Jonathan Redmond – Elvis; Dany Cooper – Blaze; Nick Meyers – Nude Tuesday; Simon Njoo – The Stranger; Margaret Sixel – Three Thousand Years of Longing
Best Original Music Score: Cezary Skubiszewski – Falling for Figaro; Angela Little – A Stitch In Time; Elliott Wheeler – Elvis; Salliana Seven Campbell – The Drover's Wife; Tom Holkenborg – Three Thousand Years of Longing	Best Sound: David Lee, Wayne Pashley, Andy Nelson, Michael Keller – Elvis; Angus Robertson, Sam Hayward, Scott Mulready, Leah Katz, Cameron Grant, Les Fiddess – Bosch & Rockit; Liam Egan, Nick Emond, Leah Katz, Robert Sullivan, Tom Heuzenroeder, Les Fiddess – The Drover's Wife; Andy Wright, Will Sheridan, Beth Bezzina, Chris Goodes – The Stranger; Robert Mackenzie, Ben Osmo, Yulia Akerholt, James Ashton – Three Thousand Years of Longing
Best Production Design: Catherine Martin, Karen Murphy, Beverley Dunn – Elvis; George Liddle – Interceptor; Sam Hobbs – The Drover's Wife; Leah Popple – The Stranger; Roger Ford – Three Thousand Years of Longing	Best Costume Design: Catherine Martin – Elvis; Wendy Cork – Here Out West; Monique Wilson, Kristie Rowe – Pieces; Tess Schofield – The Drover's Wife; Kym Barrett – Three Thousand Years of Longing

== Television ==
Best Drama Series: Mystery Road: Origin – Greer Simpkin, David Jowsey (ABC); Bump – Dan Edwards, John Edwards, Claudia Karvan, Kelsey Munro (Stan); Heartbreak High – Carly Heaton, Sarah Freeman, Chris Oliver-Taylor (Netflix); Love Me – Hamish Lewis, Michael Brooks, Angie Fielder, Polly Staniford (BINGE/Foxtel); The Tourist – Lisa Scott, Harry Williams, Jack Williams, Christopher Aird, Chris Sweeney (Stan); Wolf Like Me – Steve Hutensky, Jodi Matterson, Bruna Papandrea, Abe Forsythe (Stan)	Best Miniseries: The Twelve – Hamish Lewis, Ian Collie, Ally Henville, Rob Gibson, Michael Brooks (BINGE/Foxtel); Barons – John Molloy, Michael Lawrence, Liz Doran, Justin Davies, Chris Oliver-Taylor, Nicholas Cook (ABC); Savage River – Angie Fielder, Polly Staniford (ABC); True Colours – Penny Smallacombe, Greer Simpkin, David Jowsey (SBS); Underbelly: Vanishing Act – Kerrie Mainwaring, Matt Ford (Nine Network)
Best Comedy Program: Shaun Micallef's Mad as Hell – Peter Beck, Beth Hart, Shaun Micallef (ABC); Aftertaste – Rebecca Summerton, Matthew Bate, Erik Thomson, Julie De Fina (ABC); Five Bedrooms – Christine Bartlett, Michael Lucas. Nathan Mayfield, Tracey Robertson (Network 10); Hard Quiz – Chris Walker, Kevin Whyte, Tom Gleeson, John Tabbagh (ABC); Spicks and Specks – Rachel Millar, Anthony Watt (ABC); Summer Love – Wayne Hope, Robyn Butler (ABC)	Best Entertainment Program: LEGO Masters Australia – David McDonald, Di Yang, AJ Johnson (Nine Network); Eurovision: Australia Decides – Gold Coast 2022 – Paul Clarke, Stephanie Werrett, Emily Griggs (SBS); Mastermind – Lucy De Luca, Anthony Watt (SBS); RuPaul's Drag Race Down Under – Fenton Bailey, RuPaul Charles, Cailah Scobie, Amanda Duthie, Nicola Van der Meijden (Stan); The Dog House Australia – Sarah Thornton, Ciaran Flannery, Samantha De Alwis, Naomi Elkin (Network 10); The Voice Australia – Majella Hay, Beth Hart, Chloe Baker (Seven Network)
Best Lifestyle Program: Gardening Australia – Gill Lomas (ABC); Grand Designs Australia – Brooke Bayvel & Michael O'Neill (Foxtel); Selling Houses Australia – Nicole Rogers, Caroline Swift, Kam Vurlow, Howard Myers (Foxtel); The Cook Up with Adam Liaw – Olivia Hoopmann & Bruce Walters (SBS); The Great Australian Bake Off – Alenka Henry, Howard Myers, Kylie Washington (Foxtel); The Living Room – Tamara Simoneau & Rachael Brand (Network 10)	Best Reality Series: MasterChef Australia – David Forster, Eoin Maher, Simon Child (Network 10); Amazing Race Australia – Paul Franklin, Chris Culvenor, Sophia Mogford, Kate Shelbourn, Dave Emery (Network 10); Australian Survivor: Blood V Water – Amelia Fisk, Drina Maruna, Adam Fergusson (Network 10); I'm a Celebrity...Get Me Out of Here! – Ben Ulm, Riima Daher, Alex Mavroidakis, Beth Hart (Network 10); Luxe Listings Sydney – Paul Franklin, Chris Culvenor, Rikkie Proost, Evan Wilkes, Anastassia Gerakis, Jake Hargreaves (Amazon Prime Video); The Bridge – Amelia Fisk, Lucy Connors, Toby Trappel (Paramount+)
Best Children's Series: Bluey – Charlie Aspinwall, Sam Moor, Daley Pearson (ABC); First Day – Kirsty Stark, Kate Butler (ABC); Little J & Big Cuz – Ned Lander, Colin South, David Gurney, Alicia Rackett (ABC/NITV/SBS); MaveriX – Rachel Clements, Trisha Morton-Thomas, Sam Meikle, Isaac Elliott (ABC/Netflix); Rock Island Mysteries – Timothy Powell, Chris Oliver-Taylor, Warren Clarke, Jonah Klein (Network 10); The PM's Daughter – Chris Oliver-Taylor, Tristram Baumber, Alice Willison, Kieran Hoyle (ABC)	Best Stand-Up Special: Ronny Chieng: Speakeasy – Ronny Chieng (Netflix); Geraldine Hickey: What A Surprise – Geraldine Hickey, Frank Bruzzese, Kathleen McCarthy, Lauren Moore (Paramount+); The Melbourne International Comedy Festival 2022 Gala Supporting Oxfam – Various Performers, Rachel Millar, Kellie Williams, Susan Provan, Claire Hammond (ABC); The Melbourne International Comedy Festival 2022 Opening Night Comedy AllStars Supershow – Various Performers, Rachel Millar, Kellie Williams, Susan Provan, Claire Hammond (ABC); Tom Ballard: Enough – Tom Ballard, Frank Bruzzese, Kathleen McCarthy, Lauren Moore (Paramount+); Tommy Little: I’ll See Myself Out – Tommy Little, Kevin Whyte, Kathleen McCarthy, Nikita Agzarian (Amazon Prime Video)
Best Lead Actor in Drama: Mark Coles Smith – Mystery Road: Origin; Jamie Dornan – The Tourist; James Majoos – Heartbreak High; Sam Neill – The Twelve; Hugo Weaving – Love Me	Best Lead Actress in Drama: Tuuli Narkle – Mystery Road: Origin; Isla Fisher – Wolf Like Me; Claudia Karvan – Bump; Kate Mulvany – The Twelve; Bojana Novakovic – Love Me
Best Supporting Actor in Drama: Thomas Weatherall – Heartbreak High; Steve Bisley – Mystery Road: Origin; Brendan Cowell – The Twelve; Daniel Henshall – Mystery Road: Origin; Damon Herriman – The Tourist	Best Supporting Actress in Drama: Brooke Satchwell – The Twelve; Hayley McElhinney – Mystery Road: Origin; Jacqueline McKenzie – Savage River; Heather Mitchell – Love Me; Magda Szubanski – After the Verdict
Best Comedy Performer: Tom Gleeson – Hard Quiz; Wayne Blair – Aftertaste; Patrick Brammall – Summer Love; Harriet Dyer – Summer Love; Charlie Pickering – The Weekly with Charlie Pickering; Doris Younane – Five Bedrooms	Best Direction in Drama or Comedy: Dylan River – Mystery Road: Origin; Geoff Bennett – Bump; Gracie Otto – Heartbreak High; Emma Freeman – Love Me; Daniel Nettheim – The Twelve
Best Screenplay in Television: Hannah Carroll Chapman – Heartbreak High – Episode 1: Map Bitch; Adele Vuko – Love Me – Episode 4; Timothy Lee & Dylan River – Mystery Road: Origin – Episode 3; Blake Ayshford, Steven McGregor & Dylan River – Mystery Road: Origin – Episode 6; Sarah Walker – The Twelve – Episode 10	Best Direction in Non-Fiction Television: Kirk Docker – You Can't Ask That – Episode 1; Sally Aitken – Books That Made Us – Episode 1; Michael Venables – Fearless: The Inside Story Of The AFLW – Episode 1; Helen Barrow – Miriam Margolyes: Australia Unmasked – Episode 1; Tinzar Lwyn – Who Do You Think You Are? – Episode 4
Best Cinematography in Television: Tyson Perkins – Mystery Road: Origin – Episode 3; Simon Ozolins – Heartbreak High – Episode 1: Map Bitch; Earle Dresner – Love Me – Episode 4; Ben Wheeler – The Tourist – Episode 1; Geoffrey Hall – The Tourist – Episode 6	Best Costume Design in Television: Rita Carmody – Heartbreak High – Episode 1: Map Bitch; Heather Wallace – Firebite – Episode 3: We Don't Go Down; Cappi Ireland – Love Me – Episode 4; Terri Lamera – Mystery Road: Origin – Episode 3; Xanthe Heubel – The Twelve – Episode 10
Best Editing in Television: Nicholas Holmes – Mystery Road: Origin – Episode 3; Ariel Shaw – Bump – Episode 2; John Unwin, Orly Danon, Fiona Strain, Brendan Cain – Muster Dogs – Episode 1; Amelia Ford – Surviving Summer – Episode 7; Mark Perry – The Twelve – Episode 10	Best Production Design in Television: Scott Bird – The Tourist – Episode 1; Amy Baker – Firebite – Episode 3: We Don't Go Down; Marni Kornhauser – Heartbreak High – Episode 1: Map Bitch; Josephine Ford – Love Me – Episode 4; Herbert Pinter – Mystery Road: Origin – Episode 3
Best Original Music Score in Television: Bryony Marks – Savage River – Episode 1; Benjamin Speed – Aftertaste – Episode 3; Diego Baldenweg, Nora Baldenweg, Lionel Baldenweg – Born to Spy – Episode 4; Vincent Goodyer – Mystery Road: Origin – Episode 3; Caitlin Yeo & Basil Hogios – The PM's Daughter – Episode 9: A Date with Destiny	Best Sound in Television: Luke Mynott, Wes Chew, Trevor Hope, Dylan Barfield – Mystery Road: Origin – Episode 3; Michael Darren, Pete Smith, Josh Williams, Leah McKeown – Aftertaste – Episode 3; Manel Lopez, Stuart Morton, Diego Ruiz – Savage River – Episode 1; Scott Findlay, Nick Godkin, Justin Lloyd – Summer Love – Episode 1: Jules and Tom and Jonah and Steph; Joel McLean – Troppo – Episode 8

== Documentary ==
Best Documentary: River — Jennifer Peedom, Joseph Nizeti, Jo-anne McGowan, John Smithson; Ablaze — Alec Morgan, Tiriki Onus, Tom Zubrycki; Clean — Lachlan McLeod, David Elliot-Jones, Charlotte Wheaton; Everybody's Oma — Jason van Genderen, Roslyn Walker, Olivia Olley; Franklin — Kasimir Burgess, Christopher Kamen; Ithaka — Ben Lawrence, Gabriel Shipton, Adrian Devant	Best Documentary or Factual Television Program: Miriam Margolyes: Australia Unmasked – Laurie Critchley & Bethan Arwel-Lewis (ABC); Books That Made Us – Darren Dale & Jacob Hickey (ABC); Burning – Ben Silverman, Howard T. Owens, Eva Orner, Jonathan Schaerf, Jason Byrne (Amazon Prime Video); Fearless: The Inside Story Of The AFLW – Anne-Maree Sparkman, Cos Cardone, Luke Tunnecliffe, Becky Taylor (Disney+); People's Republic of Mallacoota – Lucy Maclaren, Joe Connor, Ken Connor (ABC); The Family Court Murders – Madeleine Hetherton-Miau, Rebecca Barry, Mark Morrissey, Debi Marshall (ABC)
Best Factual Entertainment Program: Old People's Home for Teenagers – Debbie Cuell, Tony De La Pena, Paulo Vivan, Brooke Hulsman (ABC); Back Roads – Brigid Donovan, Louise Turley (ABC); Gogglebox Australia – David McDonald, Danielle Vos (Foxtel/Network 10); Muster Dogs – Michael Boughen, Monica O'Brien (ABC); Who Do You Think You Are? – Maxine Gray (SBS); You Can't Ask That – Frances O'Riordan, Kirk Docker, Josh Schmidt (ABC)	Best Editing in a Documentary: Shannon Swan – We Were Once Kids; Tony Stevens – Ablaze; Nguyet Sang Louis Dai & Lachlan McLeod – Clean; Kasimir Burgess & Johanna Scott – Franklin; Simon Njoo – River
Best Cinematography in a Documentary: Rick Rifici – Facing Monsters; John Flavell – A Fire Inside; Danny Cohen – Anonymous Club; Cam Batten & Caspar Mazzotti, Nick Robinson – Mountain Adventure: Out of Bounds; Daniel Stoupin & Pete West – Puff: Wonders of the Reef	Best Original Music Score in a Documentary: Richard Tognetti, William Barton & Piers Burbrook de Vere – River; Matteo Zingales – A Fire Inside; Dale Cornelius – Age of Rage: The Australian Punk Revolution; Tim Count – Facing Monsters; Hylton Mowday – Puff: Wonders of the Reef
Best Sound in a Documentary: Jeremy Ashton, Ric Curtin & Xoe Baird – Facing Monsters; Luke Mynott, Wes Chew, Richard Teague & Tania Vlassova – A Fire Inside; Emma Bortignon, Simon Rosenberg & Christopher Kamen – Franklin; Tara Webb & Robert Mackenzie – River; Blair Slater, Mick Boraso, Cameron Grant & Sam Hayward – Unseen Skies

== Short form and digital ==
Best Short Film: Finding Jedda — Tanith Glynn-Maloney; Giants — Eddy Bell, Luke Mulquiney, Nonny Klaile; Hatchback — Riley Sugars, Chloe Graham, Anthony Littlechild, Jon Grosland; The Moths Will Eat Them Up — Luisa Martiri, Tanya Modini; Stonefish – Megan Smart, Nonny Klaile, George Pullar; Voice Activated – Liam Heyen, Yingna Lu, Steve Anthopoulos	Best Short Animation
Best Digital Series or Channel: A Beginner's Guide to Grief — Anna Lindner, Renee Mao, Linda Ujuk, Kate Butler, Julie Byrne; Black As — Joseph Smith, Dino Wanybarrngu, Chico Wanybarrnga, Jerome Lilypiyana, David Batty, Steve Crombie; Iggy & Ace — Riley Sugars, Chloe Graham, Anthony Littlechild, Jon Grosland; It's Fine I'm Fine — Clare Delaney, Iain Crittenden, Florence Tourbier, Stef Smith; Jimmy Rees POV – Jimmy Rees; Ozzy Man Reviews – Ethan Marrell	Best Digital Short Video: Daddy Long Legs — Dr Karl; Halloween Knockoffs — Tanya Hennessy; Sound From A Black Hole — Kirsten Banks; Stress — Ozzy Man Reviews; Tales From The Dark Web: Moira Hill – Chapter 1 – Ryan Cauchi; The Silence Is So Loud – Millie Ford

== Additional awards ==
Best Asian Film: Drive My Car (Japan) – Ryûsuke Hamaguchi, Takamasa Oe, Teruhisa Yamamoto; Barbarian Invasion (Hong Kong/Malaysia/Philippines) – Tan Chui Mui, Woo Ming Jin, Bianca Balbuena; Balloon (China) – Pema Tseden; The Disciple (India) – Chaitanya Tamhane, Alfonso Cuarón, Vivek Gomber; Hi, Mom (China) – Jia Ling; One for the Road (Thailand) – Baz Poonpiriya, Wong Kar Wai; One Second (China/Hong Kong) – Zhang Yimou, Ping Dong, William Kong, Liwei Pang, Shaokun Xiang; Sardar Udham (India) – Shoojit Sircar, Ronnie Lahiri, Sheel Kumar; Soorarai Pottru (India) – Sudha Kongara, Suriya, Jyothika, Guneet Monga	Best Visual Effects or Animation: Tom Wood, Fiona Crawford, Julian Hutchens, Joshua Simmonds & Adam Hammond – Elvis; Sharna Hackett, Feargal Stewart, Christian So, Miles Green & Etienne Marc – DC League of Super-Pets; Kelly Port, Julia Neighly, Brendan Seals & Kilou Picard – Spider-Man: No Way Home; Jake Morrison, Lisa Marra, Dan Oliver, Dan Bethell & Ian Cope – Thor: Love and Thunder; Paul Butterworth, Eric Whipp, Jason Bath, Roy Malhi, Chris Spry, Alastair Stephen & Chris Davies – Three Thousand Years of Longing
Best Hair and Makeup: Shane Thomas, Louise Coulston, Mark Coulier & Jason Baird – Elvis; Jennifer Lamphee & Beth Halsted – Gold; Beth Halsted, Simon Joseph & Jennifer Lamphee – The Drover's Wife; Lesley Vanderwalt – Three Thousand Years of Longing; Rachel Scane, Helen Magelaki & Mariel McClorey – Wyrmwood: Apocalypse	Best Casting: Kirsty McGregor – The Twelve; Nikki Barret & Denise Chamian – Elvis; Amanda Mitchell – Heartbreak High; Nathan Lloyd – Love Me; Anousha Zarkesh – The Stranger
Audience Choice Award for Best Film: Elvis; Thirteen Lives; Thor: Love and Thunder; Ticket to Paradise; The Drover's Wife: The Legend of Molly Johnson; Wog Boys Forever	Audience Choice Award for Best Television Series: Heartbreak High; Bluey; Gogglebox Australia; Have You Been Paying Attention?; Home and Away; Married at First Sight
Audience Choice Award for Best Actor: Bryn Chapman-Parish – Heartbreak High; Chris Hemsworth – Thor: Love and Thunder; Christian Ravello – Here Out West; Hazem Shammas – The Twelve; Jacob Elordi – Euphoria; Thomas Weatherall – Heartbreak High	Audience Choice Award for Best Actress: Chloé Hayden – Heartbreak High; Asher Yasbincek – Heartbreak High; Ayesha Madon – Heartbreak High; Isla Fisher – Wolf Like Me; Margot Robbie – Amsterdam; Rebel Wilson – Senior Year
Audience Choice Award for Best Television Personality: Abbie Chatfield; Adam and Symon from Gogglebox; Andy Lee; Chris Brown; Hamish Blake; Robert Irwin	Audience Choice Award for Best Digital Creator: Kat Clark; Anna Paul; Esmé Louise James; Jeff van de Zandt; Luke and Sassy Scott; Sooshi Mango
Audience Choice Award for Best Sports Program: Women's Footy (Nine Network); 100% Footy (Nine Network); AFL Sunday Footy Show (Nine Network); Friday Night Football AFL (Foxtel); Friday Night Football NRL (Foxtel); The Front Bar (Seven Network)	Audience Choice Award for Best Sports Commentary Team: 2022 AFL Grand Final (Seven Network); 2021 Melbourne Cup (Network 10); 2022 AFL season (Foxtel); 2022 AFL season (Seven Network); 2022 Australian Open (Nine Network); 2022 Commonwealth Games (Seven Network)
