= Bryn Chapman Parish =

Australian singer and actor (born 1997)

- Born: 18 August 1997 (age 29); Sydney, New South Wales, Australia
- Education: Newtown High School of the Performing Arts; Western Australian Academy of Performing Arts (BFA)
- Occupations: Singer; actor
- Years active: 2014–present
- Musical career
- Genre: Rock
- Instruments: Vocals; guitar
- Member of: Mac the Knife

Bryn Chapman Parish (born 18 August 1997) is an Australian singer and actor. He is well known for his role as Spencer 'Spider' White in the Netflix comedy drama series Heartbreak High (2022-2026). Alongside acting, Chapman Parish is lead-singer and frontman of the post-punk band Mac The Knife.

== Career ==
Born in Sydney, he began his career on the stage in France. After first gaining interest in acting in a traveling production of Cyrano de Bergerac, Chapman Parish made his professional acting debut with an uncredited role in the biographical war film Unbroken (2014), directed by Angelina Jolie. He had a number of roles in short films during the late 2010s and a small role in the television series Mr Inbetween (2021), before his breakthrough in the Netflix comedy drama series Heartbreak High (2022–2026), a reboot of the eponymous 1990s series. Chapman Parish's role in the series won him the AACTA Audience Choice Award for Best Actor.

Chapman Parish is also the frontman of the post-punk band Mac the Knife.

== Filmography ==
=== Film ===
Year	Title	Role	Notes	Ref.
2016	Hellion	Claude	Short film	
2017	Tangles and Knots	Nathan	Short film	
2018	Short Lips	Dealer	Short film	
2019	The Docks	Hugo	Short film	
2023	Idiot-Proof	Security Guard	Short Film	
2024	Set Menu	Waiter	Short Film	
2025	Jimpa	Young Jim		
2025	Welcome Back to My Channel	Leo Reid	Main role	
2026	Forget Me, Not	Walt	Short film	
TBA	Song and Fury	Tom	Short film	Post-production

=== Television ===
Year	Title	Role	Notes	Ref.
2021	Mr Inbetween	James	3 episodes	
2022-2026	Heartbreak High	Spencer 'Spider' White	Main role (24 episodes)	
