= Logie Awards of 2025 =

Australian television awards ceremony

65th Logie Awards
- Date: 3 August 2025
- Site: The Star, Sydney, New South Wales
- Hosted by: Sam Pang
- Official website: tvweeklogies.com.au

Highlights
- Gold Logie: Lynne McGranger
- Hall of Fame: Magda Szubanski
- Most awards: Fisk (5)
- Most nominations: Apple Cider Vinegar (8)

Television coverage
- Network: Seven Network

The 65th Annual TV Week Logie Awards ceremony was held on 3 August 2025 at The Star, Sydney and broadcast on the Seven Network. The ceremony was hosted by Sam Pang, returning for his third consecutive year.

== Winners and nominees ==
Nominees were announced on 16 June 2025.

=== Gold Logie ===
Most Popular Personality on Australian Television
- Lynne McGranger in Home and Away (Seven Network)
  - Ally Langdon in A Current Affair and Olympic Games Paris 2024 (Nine Network)
  - Hamish Blake in Lego Masters (Nine Network)
  - Julia Morris in I'm a Celebrity...Get Me Out of Here! (Network 10)
  - Lisa Millar in Back Roads, News Breakfast, Muster Dogs: Collies & Kelpies and Muster Dogs: Where Are They Now (ABC)
  - Poh Ling Yeow in MasterChef Australia (Network 10)
  - Sonia Kruger in The Voice, Dancing with the Stars and Logies Red Carpet (Seven Network)

=== Acting/Presenting ===
Best Lead Actor in a Drama	Best Lead Actress in a Drama
Sam Neill in The Twelve (Binge/Foxtel); Lloyd Griffith in Return to Paradise (ABC); Michael Dorman in Territory (Netflix); Robert Taylor in Territory (Netflix); Sam Corlett in Territory (Netflix); Tai Hara in Return to Paradise (ABC)	Lynne McGranger in Home and Away (Seven Network); Alycia Debnam-Carey in Apple Cider Vinegar (Netflix); Anna Samson in Return to Paradise (ABC); Anna Torv in Territory (Netflix); Ayesha Madon in Heartbreak High (Netflix); Kaitlyn Dever in Apple Cider Vinegar (Netflix)
Best Lead Actor in a Comedy	Best Lead Actress in a Comedy
Aaron Chen in Fisk (ABC); Ben Miller in Austin (ABC); Clancy Brown in Good Cop/Bad Cop (Stan); Luke Cook in Good Cop/Bad Cop (Stan); Michael Theo in Austin (ABC); Patrick Brammall in Colin from Accounts (Binge/Foxtel)	Kitty Flanagan in Fisk (ABC); Harriet Dyer in Colin from Accounts (Binge/Foxtel); Jenna Owen in Nugget Is Dead: A Christmas Story (Stan); Leighton Meester in Good Cop/Bad Cop (Stan); Sally Phillips in Austin (ABC); Vic Zerbst in Nugget Is Dead: A Christmas Story (Stan)
Best Supporting Actor	Best Supporting Actress
Glenn Butcher in Fisk (ABC); Ashley Zukerman in Apple Cider Vinegar (Netflix); Darren Gilshenan in Colin from Accounts (Binge/Foxtel); Mark Coles Smith in Apple Cider Vinegar (Netflix); Matt Nable in Apple Cider Vinegar (Netflix); Sam Delich in Territory (Netflix)	Julia Zemiro in Fisk (ABC); Aisha Dee in Apple Cider Vinegar (Netflix); Chloé Hayden in Heartbreak High (Netflix); Marg Downey in The Newsreader (ABC); Michelle Lim Davidson in The Newsreader (ABC); Tilda Cobham-Hervey in Apple Cider Vinegar (Netflix)
Ray Martin Award for Most Popular News or Public Affairs Presenter	Graham Kennedy Award for Most Popular New Talent
Ally Langdon in A Current Affair (Nine Network); David Speers in Insiders (ABC); Michael Usher in Seven News and Seven News Spotlight (Seven Network); Peter Overton in Nine News (Nine Network); Sarah Ferguson in 7.30 (ABC); Tara Brown in 60 Minutes and Dangerous Lies: Unmasking Belle Gibson (Nine Network)	Guy Montgomery in Guy Montgomery's Guy Mont-Spelling Bee (ABC); Hailey Pinto in Home and Away (Seven Network); Jenny Tian in Taskmaster Australia (Network 10); Kate Miller-Heidke in The Voice (Seven Network); Kylah Day in Territory (Netflix); Sofia Levin in MasterChef Australia (Network 10)
Bert Newton Award for Most Popular Presenter
Todd Woodbridge in Tipping Point Australia, Australian Open and Olympic and Paralympic Games Paris 2024 (Nine Network); Hamish Blake in Lego Masters (Nine Network); Julia Morris in I'm a Celebrity...Get Me Out of Here! (Network 10); Ricki-Lee Coulter in Australian Idol (Seven Network); Sonia Kruger in The Voice, Dancing with the Stars and Logies Red Carpet (Seven Network); Zan Rowe in Take 5 with Zan Rowe and ABC New Year's Eve (ABC)

=== Programs ===
Best Drama Program	Best Miniseries or Telemovie
Return to Paradise (ABC); Bump (Stan); Heartbreak High (Netflix); Territory (Netflix); The Newsreader (ABC); The Twelve (Binge/Foxtel)	Apple Cider Vinegar (Netflix); Critical Incident (Stan); Fake (Paramount+); How to Make Gravy (Binge/Foxtel); Human Error (Nine Network); Plum (ABC)
Best Entertainment Program	Best Current Affairs Program
The Voice (Seven Network); ABC New Year's Eve (ABC); Australian Idol (Seven Network); Countdown 50 Years On (ABC); Dancing with the Stars (Seven Network); Vision Australia's Carols by Candlelight (Nine Network)	Australian Story (ABC); 60 Minutes (Nine Network); 7.30 (ABC); A Current Affair (Nine Network); Four Corners (ABC); Seven News Spotlight (Seven Network)
Best Scripted Comedy Program	Best Comedy Entertainment Program
Fisk (ABC); Austin (ABC); Colin from Accounts (Binge/Foxtel); Good Cop/Bad Cop (Stan); Melbourne International Comedy Festival (ABC); Optics (ABC)	Have You Been Paying Attention? (Network 10); Gruen (ABC); Hard Quiz (ABC); Sam Pang Tonight (Network 10); Thank God You're Here (Network 10); The Weekly with Charlie Pickering (ABC)
Best Competition Reality Program	Best Structured Reality Program
Lego Masters (Nine Network); Alone Australia (SBS); Australian Survivor: Brains V Brawn II (Network 10); MasterChef Australia (Network 10); My Kitchen Rules (Seven Network); The Block (Nine Network)	Muster Dogs: Collies & Kelpies (ABC); The Farmer Wants a Wife (Seven Network); Gogglebox Australia (Network 10); Married at First Sight (Nine Network); Shark Tank Australia (Network 10); The Real Housewives of Sydney (Binge/Foxtel)
Best Lifestyle Program	Best News Coverage or Public Affairs Report
Travel Guides (Nine Network); Better Homes and Gardens (Seven Network); Do You Want to Live Forever? (Nine Network); Gardening Australia (ABC); Grand Designs Australia (ABC); Restoration Australia (ABC)	"Betrayal of Trust" (Four Corners, ABC); "Building Bad" (60 Minutes, Nine Network); "Courage & Science" (A Current Affair, Nine Network); "Cyclone Alfred" (Seven News, Seven Network); "Melbourne Protests" (Sunrise, Seven Network); "Trump Assassination Attempt" (Seven News, Seven Network)
Best Factual or Documentary Program	Best Sports Coverage
Unbreakable: The Jelena Dokic Story (Nine Network); Big Miracles (Nine Network); Ego: The Michael Gudinski Story (Seven Network); Miriam Margolyes: Impossibly Australian (ABC); The Assembly (ABC); Tsunami: 20 Years On (Nine Network)	Olympic Games Paris 2024 (Nine Network); 2024 AFL finals series (Seven Network); 2024 State of Origin (Nine Network); 2025 Australian Open Finals (Nine Network); Australia V India: Border–Gavaskar Trophy (Kayo Sports/Foxtel); Matildas V China PR (Network 10)
Best Children's Program
Bluey (ABC); Ginger and the Vegesaurs (ABC); Hard Quiz Kids (ABC); Little J & Big Cuz (NITV/ABC); Play School (ABC); Rock Island Mysteries (Network 10)
