= Ioane Sa'ula =

Australian-Samoan actor

- Occupation: actor
- Notable work: Bump; The F Ward

Ioane Sa'ula is an Australian-Samoan actor who is best known for his roles as Vince Ingram in Bump and as Jimmy Seufale in medical drama The F Ward.

== Early life ==
In 2016, Sa'ula broke both bones in his leg in a freak football accident, Sa'ula said the two-year recovery lead him to pursue acting and he found his passion in performing.

== Career ==
In 2021, Sa'ula appeared in his first major television series in the Stan series Bump and would appear in all five seasons of the show, and in November 2025 Sa'ula appeared in Bump's Christmas film in the role of Vince Ingram. Dan Edwards, a producer on Bump told him that they wanted to create a medical series around his performance.

He was in Australian drama series Last King of the Cross (2024) as Junior, and in the film The Deb (2024) as Damo. In 2024, he had a supporting role as Birdie the PA in the Hollywood film The Fall Guy, starring Ryan Gosling and Emily Blunt.

In 2025, Sa'ula was named in the Casting Guild of Australia contingent of Rising Stars.

He was cast in Stan medical drama series The F Ward on 2025, playing intern Jimmy Seufale. A talented but reckless intern who has Long QT syndrome, who happens to be in a romantic relationship with his supervisor, surgeon Dr Gloria Wall, played by Anna Friel. Friel called him "one of Australia's next big discoveries." Sa'ula's performance received positive attention from critics. The AU Review wrote that he "ultimately steals the show" describing the performance as "immensely layered," TV Tonight described his portrayal as "affable" in a role that would "cement him on the drama map."

== Filmography ==
=== Television ===
Year	Title	Role	Notes	Ref
2026	The F Ward	Jimmy Seufele	Main cast	
2026	Heartbreak High	Noah	Main cast	
2026	Monarch: Legacy of Monsters	Tama	1 episode (2.4)	
2021-24	Bump	Vince Ingram	Main cast	
2024	Plum	Brad Molifa	1 episode (1.4)	
2024	Last King of the Cross	Junior	Main cast (season 2)	
2024	Granny Flat Comedy	Ioane	1 episode (1.21)	
2021	Preppers	Jason	1 episode (1.6)	
2021	Doctor Doctor	Brody	1 episode (5.5)	

=== Films ===
Year	Title	Role	Notes
2025	Bump: A Christmas Film	Vince Ingram	Film
2024	The Deb	Damo	
2024	The Fall Guy	Birdie the PA	
2021	Shark	Ziggy	Documentary
