= Thou Shalt Not Steal (TV series) =

Australian television comedy series

- Genre: Black comedy; Crime
- Created by: Dylan River; Tanith Glynn-Maloney
- Directed by: Dylan River
- Starring: Sherry-Lee Watson; Will McDonald; Miranda Otto; Noah Taylor; Darren Gilshenan; Shari Sebbens; Natasha Wanganeen; Warren H. Williams; Justin Rosniak
- Composer: Vincent Goodyer
- Country of origin: Australia
- Original language: English
- No. of seasons: 1
- No. of episodes: 8

Production
- Executive producers: Daley Pearson; Charlie Aspinwall; Tanith Glynn-Maloney; Sophie Miller
- Producers: Lauren Brown; Sam Moor
- Cinematography: Tyson Perkins
- Editor: Chris Plummer
- Camera setup: Single-camera
- Production companies: Ludo Studio; Since1788 Productions; Stan

Original release
- Network: Stan
- Release: 17 October 2024

Thou Shalt Not Steal is an Australian crime comedy drama television series created by Dylan River and Tanith Glynn-Maloney that premiered on 17 October 2024, on Stan. The series follows a pair of teenagers as they are chased across the desert by a sex worker and fraudulent preacher. It stars Sherry-Lee Watson, Will McDonald, Miranda Otto, and Noah Taylor.

== Premise ==
Thou Shalt Not Steal is a 1980s-set road drama that follows young Aboriginal delinquent Robyn, who escapes juvenile detention and visits her terminally ill grandfather, Ringer, in the hospital. Ringer demands to be taken back home, where he claims to have an important errand.

After being unable to pay for a taxi, Robyn is confronted by the driver, Maxine, a madam who tries to recruit her as payment. After a scuffle, Robyn steals the taxi and flees with her Grandfather. Ringer's condition worsens during the drive and he tells Robyn her father is still alive and that he wants her to return a trophy to him. He passes away shortly before they reach the town.

Meanwhile, a fraudulent preacher, Robert, and his son, Gidge, hold court throughout the town, conducting sermons and secretly selling booze. Gidge desperately wants to leave his father and return to his mother in Adelaide.

Shortly after finding the trophy, Robyn discovers that police have come looking for her and she makes a plan to escape in the stolen taxi. Sensing an opportunity to go home, Gidge hides, stowed away under the backseat. Unaware of his presence, she sets off to find her father in Coober Pedy.

The next day, Maxine arrives in the town and begins making enquiries about the whereabouts of her taxi. Robert offers her the use of his car to track the teenagers down and they set off in pursuit.

== Cast and characters ==
- Sherry-Lee Watson as Robyn, a young Aboriginal woman who has recently escaped juvenile detention
- Will McDonald as Gidge, an awkward son of a fraudulent travelling preacher
- Noah Taylor as Robert Snr, a fraudulent preacher on the run from his past
- Miranda Otto as Maxine, a cunning madam who manages sex workers around the outback from her taxi
- Darren Gilshenan as Mick, an Australian Federal Police (AFP) officer who pursues Robyn and Gidge with his partner, Tracey
- Shari Sebbens as Tracey, an AFP Officer in pursuit of Robyn and Gidge with her partner, Mick
- Natasha Wanganeen as Mary, Robyn's alcoholic mother
- Warren H. Williams as Ringer, Robyn's terminally ill grandfather
- Justin Rosniak as Steve, Robyn's father
- Eddie Baroo as Big Pete
- Damian Walshe-Howling as Spider
- Fletcher Humphrys as Penguin

== Episodes ==
No. in season	Title	Directed by	Written by	Original Air Date
1	"Chapter one: All This For A Cup"	Dylan River	Dylan River	17 October 2024
2	"Chapter Two: Stealin' Donkeys"	Dylan River	Dylan River, Tanith Glynn-Maloney, Sophie Miller	17 October 2024
3	"Chapter Three: Coober Pedy's A Long Way"	Dylan River	Dylan River, Tanith Glynn-Maloney, Sophie Miller	17 October 2024
4	"Chapter Four: Bullet To The Head..."	Dylan River	Dylan River, Tanith Glynn-Maloney, Sophie Miller	17 October 2024
5	"Chapter Five: There Will Be Murder"	Dylan River	Dylan River, Sophie Miller	17 October 2024
6	"Chapter Six: Biggest Disappointment"	Dylan River	Dylan River, Sophie Miller & Samuel Nuggin-Paynter	17 October 2024
7	"Chapter Seven: Ball Bags"	Dylan River	Dylan River, Sophie Miller & Samuel Nuggin-Paynter	17 October 2024
8	"Chapter Eight: Happy Endings"	Dylan River	Dylan River, Tanith Glynn-Maloney, Sophie Miller, Benedict Paxton-Crick	17 October 2024

== Production ==
=== Development ===
In 2023, Australian streaming platform Stan announced they were partnering with Ludo Studio to commission an eight-episode road series set in Central and South Australia. Dylan River and Tanith Glynn-Maloney (his cousin) were announced as the series creators, with River to direct all eight episodes. The series received financial investment from Screen Australia, production support from South Australian Film Corporation, Screen Territory and post production incentives from Screen Queensland.

River wrote a 300-page treatment for the project over the COVID-19 lockdowns. The series was intended to build on the themes and tone explored by River in his 2019 series Robbie Hood. River explained he wanted to look at Aboriginal political issues "but through comedy... sort of like bent, twisted ways of looking at some dire situations". Part of River's motivation was to make a series which could reach a more mainstream audience, as he felt like he had been "preaching to the converted" with previous projects and that "Indigenous filmmaking, for the most part, hasn't quite reached more of a commercial audience".

The decision to set the series in the 1980s was based on River's love for the mechanical aesthetics of the era, stories he had heard from his family and the challenge of storytelling without mobile phones. He said: "I love mechanical stuff... I own a couple of 1970s Fords... And storytelling before mobile phones, it's harder but more rewarding. Also, I grew up with a father who was a teenager in the '80s and I'd always hear stories and wish I was around at that time". River also spoke about the "wild" nature of Alice Springs during the period and how petty crimes often became the basis of recreational activities.

In September 2023, Sherry-Lee Watson, Will McDonald, Miranda Otto, and Noah Taylor were cast in the series.

=== Shooting ===
The production began principal photography in Alice Springs during September 2023.

The series' exteriors were largely shot on the road in locations between Alice Springs and Adelaide, while interiors were shot in Adelaide. River was determined to film in real world locations that aligned with the character's journey through the story as much as possible.

=== Music ===
The soundtrack was a notable part of the production, with artists including Slim Dusty, the Warumpi Band, and the Yamma family.

== Release ==
The series had its world premiere at the 2024 Toronto International Film Festival, with a screening of the first three episodes All eight episodes would later screen at the Araluen Arts Centre in Alice Springs and SXSW Sydney.

The series was released on Stan on 17 October 2024.

International rights for the series were handled by DCD Rights.

== Reception ==
=== Critical response ===
Thou Shalt Not Steal received a positive response from reviewers. Luke Buckmaster for The Guardian said "Thou Shalt Not Steal has future classic written all over it." Craig Mathieson for The Sydney Morning Herald wrote "it manages to find a genuine emotional core in its young absconders". The series also notably received positive comparisons to the works of the Coen brothers.

Jason Di Rosso, of ABC Radio National's The Screen Show, called it "one of the best TV shows of the year". In an interview with River, he praised the acting, directing, use of music, and many other features, and said that he had already started re-watching the series.

Sherry-Lee Watson's role was praised as a "star-making lead". Reviewers noted that she did "much of the heavy lifting" and had a performance "chock-full of youthful intemperance, moving with a coy and cheeky swagger." Both Miranda Otto and Noah Taylor were commended for their performances, with Otto "providing some real menace" and Taylor "as the dissolute man of religion is both entertainingly shabby and possibly someone you’d best keep at a distance."

The Sydney Morning Herald also commended the show's directing, saying River "knows exactly when to cut to a striking wide shot, so these chaotic characters are suddenly framed by the desert's vastness", while The Guardian said, "River bolts out of the gates and maintains a rambunctiously entertaining tone until the very last scene".

The show's use of music was also celebrated, with the soundtrack creating "bounce and jive". Buckmaster praised the show's use of Slim Dusty's song "The Biggest Disappointment" as a reflection of the series' attitudes and themes.

Kelly McWilliam, associate professor of communication and media at the University of Southern Queensland, writing in The Conversation, like Jason Di Rosso drew comparisons with River's directorial debut, Robbie Hood in its tone and themes, and called Thou Shalt Not Steal "a slick, well-made series with terrific attention to detail".
