= Will McDonald (actor) =

Australian actor (born 1998)

William McDonald
- Born: 21 September 1998 (age 28); Sydney, Australia
- Occupation: Actor
- Years active: 2012–present

William “Will” McDonald (born 21 September 1998) is an Australian actor. He gained recognition for playing Jett James in the soap opera Home and Away (2012–2019). He has since starred in the Netflix comedy drama series Heartbreak High (2022–2026) and the Stan crime comedy Thou Shalt Not Steal (2024); both earned him acclaim and for the former, he received his first AACTA Award nomination.

== Early life and education ==
Will McDonald was born on 21 September 1998. He discovered his passion for acting during an end of year primary school showcase.

He attended The King's School in Parramatta, Sydney, completing year 12 in 2016. He studied drama there and played a major role in the school production of The Government Inspector.

== Career ==
In April 2012, McDonald was cast as Jett James, a delinquent teenager, in Australian soap opera Home and Away. McDonald made his debut screen appearance during Episode 5512, broadcast on 7 May 2012.

In November 2021, McDonald was cast in the Netflix comedy drama Heartbreak High as Douglas "Ca$h" Piggott.

In 2022, he played Oscar in a stage performance of Let the Right One In for Darlinghurst Theatre.

In 2024, McDonald had a leading role in Stan original Thou Shalt Not Steal. He starred alongside Heartbreak High co-star Sherry-Lee Watson, who suggested him for the role.

In September 2024, McDonald was announced to star in the Joanna Murray-Smith penned adaptation of The Talented Mr. Ripley at the Sydney Theatre Company in 2025.

== Recognition and accolades ==
In 2024, McDonald was nominated for the Heath Ledger Scholarship for emerging Australian actors.
