= War (TV series) =

British-American television series (2026–)

- Genre: Legal drama Anthology
- Created by: George Kay
- Starring: Dominic West; Sienna Miller; Phoebe Fox; James McArdle; Nina Sosanya; Pip Torrens; Archie Renaux; Emma Laird; Marisa Tomei; Kelly Macdonald; David Harewood; Richard Schiff
- Music by: Oli Julian
- Countries of origin: United Kingdom; United States
- Original language: English
- No. of series: 1
- No. of episodes: 8

Production
- Executive producers: George Kay; Willow Grylls; Susan Breen; Ben Taylor; Megan Spanjian; Andrea Dewsbury; Matt Sandford
- Producers: Laurie Borg; Jyoti Fernandes
- Cinematography: Oli Russell; Oliver Curtis
- Editors: David Webb; Eve Doherty; Phil Hignett; Anna Dick
- Running time: 46–54 minutes
- Production companies: New Pictures; Observatory Pictures; Sky Studios

Original release
- Network: HBO (US)
- Release: 1 October 2026 – present
- Network: Sky Atlantic (UK)
- Release: 2 October 2026 – present

War (stylised in all caps) is a legal drama anthology television series created by George Kay. The show premiered on 1 October 2026, on HBO in the United States and on the following night on Sky Atlantic in the United Kingdom. In its first series, the series follows a divorce between an actress (Sienna Miller) and a tech mogul (Dominic West). The couple engages in increasingly acrimonious litigation, led by rival law firms. A young lawyer on the wife's legal team (Archie Renaux) attempts to play both sides, acting as a mole for the husband's lawyers.

== Premise ==
The series follows prestigious rival firms and their high-profile cases.

== Cast and characters ==
=== Series 1 ===
==== Main ====
- Dominic West as Morgan Henderson, a high-profile CEO of social media site Zephyr and Carla's husband
- Sienna Miller as Carla Duval, a famous international film star and Morgan's wife
- Phoebe Fox as Serena Byrne, law partner at Taylor & Byrne and Nick's wife
- James McArdle as Nicholas "Nick" Taylor, law partner at Taylor & Byrne and Serena's husband
- Nina Sosanya as Beatrice "Queen Bea" Ubosi, law partner at Cathcarts
- Pip Torrens as St. John Smallwood, law partner at Cathcarts
- Archie Renaux as Jonathan "Johnny" Warren, an ambitious young lawyer from Peckham
- Emma Laird as Molly Giordano, training associate at Taylor & Byrne and Saeed's best friend
- Nick Mohammed as Michael Stefano, staffer at Taylor & Byrne
- Celia Imrie as Joy "Budgie" Budge, a barrister engaged by Taylor & Byrne
- Shaheen Jafargholi as Saeed Masood, training associate at Taylor & Byrne and Molly's best friend
- Akiya Henry as Nora Okafo, training associate at Taylor & Byrne
- Honor Swinton Byrne as Bella Croft, a public relations executive and Johnny's much wealthier girlfriend
- Miles Jupp as David Schill, senior associate at Cathcarts
- Kartanya Maynard as Suzie Levitnik
- Alexandra Mardell as Cleo Hyland, training associate at Taylor & Byrne
- Mark Quartley as Fred Templeman
- Steve Furst as Bernard, financial advisor at Taylor & Byrne
- Patrick Fabian as Eric, Morgan's assistant
- Angel Coulby as Gillian Pope, the chief financial officer of Zephyr and Morgan's financial advisor

==== Guest ====
- Rose Williams as Flora Monroe, a friend of Carla's who has a one-night stand with Morgan
- Camille Coduri as Melinda "Mumsy" Monroe, Flora's mother
- Aran Murphy as Gabriel "Gabe" Duval, Carla's sixteen-year-old son and Morgan's stepson
- Jake Simmance as Angus, Bella's childhood friend
- Caroline Harker as Harriet Croft, Bella's mother
- Amara Karan as Alanda Brown, the court mediator in the divorce
- Robert Daws as Steven Dixon, a legal and financial advisor hired to assist Morgan

=== Series 2 ===
- Marisa Tomei as Avery Reed
- Kelly Macdonald as Jo MacNeil
- David Harewood as Jefferson Allen
- Richard Schiff as Elliott Wyatt
- Claire Skinner
- Omari Douglas
- Kadiff Kirwan
- Douglas Booth
- Charles Edwards
- Luca Pasqualino
- Rebecca Front
- Alexandra Maria Lara
- Linus Roache
- Violet Braeckman
- Sasha Behar
- Sid Phoenix
- Cornelius Booth
- Megan Channell

== Episodes ==
=== Series 1 (2026) ===
The first series follows two prestigious law firms in London, "Cathcarts" and "Taylor & Byrne," as they face off in a scandalous divorce case between a tech entrepreneur and his film star wife.

No.	Title	Directed by	Written by	Original release date
1	"It's Done"	Ben Taylor	George Kay	1 October 2026 (US)
1	"It's Done"	Ben Taylor	George Kay	2 October 2026 (UK)
Morgan Henderson, the London-based CEO of social media site Zephyr, sleeps with a woman named Flora whom he meets after an award show. Unbeknownst to him, Flora is a friend of his estranged wife and film star Carla Duval, who set up the encounter as a honey trap to use against him in her divorce case. Carla meets with her lawyers Nick Taylor and Serena Byrne to discuss her plans to divorce Morgan. Morgan decides to mount his own divorce case against Carla. Aspiring lawyer Johnny Warren, a working-class young man, interviews at Cathcarts and various smaller law firms, but is unable to get a job. Taylor & Byrne, desperate to get more talent, hire him as a junior lawyer for Carla's upcoming divorce case. Morgan meets with his own lawyers at Cathcarts and learns that Johnny is in fact a mole secretly working for Cathcarts.
2	"No More Nasty Surprises"	Ben Taylor	George Kay	8 October 2026 (US)
2	"No More Nasty Surprises"	Ben Taylor	George Kay	9 October 2026 (UK)
Each firm is using mediation sessions between the couple to get information on the other. Serena becomes convinced that Cathcarts found out about Carla's case through Flora and tries to get Flora to sign a non-disclosure agreement for her silence. Flora refuses to sign. Flora's mother Melinda shows up at Cathcarts, intending to meet with Serena, but is unable to reach her. Johnny learns about the NDA that Flora will not sign unless she gets twenty thousand pounds first. He relays this information to his contact at Cathcarts, senior partner David Schill, who figures out that Flora was set up by Carla. Johnny is sent to Flora and Melinda's home to get them to sign the NDA. At the last mediation session, Morgan and Carla confirm they want to go forward with arbitration. While at home with her mother, Flora texts Morgan to ask if she can see him again.
3	"Chip Off the Block"	Ben Taylor	Kelly Jones	15 October 2026 (US)
3	"Chip Off the Block"	Ben Taylor	Kelly Jones	16 October 2026 (UK)
Carla’s teenage son Gabe intuits that someone in the marriage was unfaithful. During a meeting with his advisors, Morgan learns that Carla cannot take his stock in Zephyr if he transfers his shares over to Zephyr's CFO Gillian Pope; he refuses the offer. Gabe takes a train to London to stay with Morgan, but angrily leaves when Morgan admits to infidelity. Carla calls Johnny, who leaves Bella's black-tie work event to help Carla. Gabe attends the couple's arbitration session at Taylor & Byrne's offices. When Morgan and Carla get in an argument over him, Gabe interrupts and storms out; Morgan is the only one who goes after him. With the arbitrator convinced that there is a significant lifestyle change, the prenup gets voided.
4	"Sing"	China Moo-Young	Jess Brittain	22 October 2026 (US)
4	"Sing"	China Moo-Young	Jess Brittain	23 October 2026 (UK)
As the final round of arbitration begins, Taylor & Byrne are confident that they can reach a settlement amount of half a billion pounds. They find that Cathcarts is only willing to settle for a comparatively paltry sum of forty-five million, leaving an angry Carla to consider firing them. Johnny learns through social media activity that Zephyr is considering selling to fellow tech CEO Michael Ancker; if a sale happens, then Carla immediately gets half of the proceeds. Taylor & Byrne training associate Saeed Masood sees St. John get rejected by a younger man at a nightclub and sleeps with Ancker's assistant Noah, who reveals that Morgan is not interested in selling Zephyr but that Gillian and some of his other employees are, and that the transferring of his shares could facilitate a sale. Johnny is tasked with photocopying some documents and secretly sends a copy of Taylor & Byrne's profit/loss statement to Cathcarts. While he is sending the documents over to Carla, she and Johnny share a kiss.
5	"Every Little Thing She Does"	China Moo-Young	Toby Finlay	29 October 2026 (US)
5	"Every Little Thing She Does"	China Moo-Young	Toby Finlay	30 October 2026 (UK)
Carla goes on a late-night talk show to promote The Milliner and makes her ongoing divorce with Morgan public and insults the studio audience in the process. Public opinion becomes firmly on Morgan's side, and Taylor & Byrne decide to hire Grace Hopper, a crisis management executive. Carla erroneously lists a Ferrari Testarossa as one of her assets. Training associate Molly Giordano types up the list, but is told by Serena to leave the Ferrari off. Johnny sends the asset list that includes the Ferrari to Cathcarts. Ancker shows up to Morgan's office to convince him to sell Zephyr to him for two billion pounds, which he flatly refuses. Cathcarts sends Carla's asset list back to Taylor & Byrne, which includes the Ferrari; seeing the error, Molly and Saeed become convinced that there is a mole in their ranks.
6	"The Simple Act of Paying Attention"	China Moo-Young	Chloe Mai White	5 November 2026 (US)
6	"The Simple Act of Paying Attention"	China Moo-Young	Chloe Mai White	6 November 2026 (UK)
Molly and Saeed start speculating about the error on the asset list; Johnny attempts to convince them not to tell anyone else. Molly sends an email to Serena about the error and her suspicion that there might be a mole. Nick and Serena conduct a thorough internal investigation but are unable to come up with anything concrete. St. John approaches Johnny and offers him a job at Cathcarts if he can find actual evidence of Flora's honey-trapping; Johnny seduces Carla and takes a look at her text correspondence with Flora, but is unable to find anything. The day before the case goes to court, Johnny decides to frame Saeed by sending an email to Cathcarts from Saeed's laptop confirming his identity as the mole. After Saeed gets fired, an overconfident Johnny walks into the courthouse and accidentally lets slip a Keanu Reeves quote that David frequently says, leading Serena to become suspicious.
7	"The Juicy Bit"	Jennifer Sheridan	Emilie Robson	12 November 2026 (US)
7	"The Juicy Bit"	Jennifer Sheridan	Emilie Robson	13 November 2026 (UK)
8	"Partners"	Jennifer Sheridan	Jess Brittain	19 November 2026 (US)
8	"Partners"	Jennifer Sheridan	Jess Brittain	20 November 2026 (UK)

=== Series 2 ===
The second series follows the two rival law firms as they take on an explosive defamation case.

== Production ==
=== Development ===
Sky UK and co-producer HBO ordered two series in an anthology format. George Kay is the show's creator and showrunner with Ben Taylor as director. The series is produced by New Pictures and Observatory Pictures. Executive producers include Kay, Taylor, Willow Grylls, Matt Sandford, Susan Breen, Andrea Dewsbury and Megan Spanjian. Alongside Kay, the writers of the series include Kelly Jones, Jess Brittain, Catherine Shepherd, Yemi Oyefuwa and Krissie Ducker.

=== Casting ===
The cast of the first series is led by Dominic West and Sienna Miller with Phoebe Fox, James McArdle, Pip Torrens, Nina Sosanya and Archie Renaux. Nick Mohammed, Celia Imrie, Shaheen Jafargholi, Akiya Henry, Honor Swinton Byrne, Miles Jupp, Kartanya Maynard, Alexandra Mardell, Mark Quartley and Steve Furst have series regular roles, while Rose Williams, Camille Coduri and Aran Murphy joined the cast in guest roles for series one. In November 2025, it was announced that Emma Laird joined the cast for series one.

The cast of the second series is led by Marisa Tomei, Kelly Macdonald, David Harewood and Richard Schiff, with Claire Skinner, Omari Douglas, Kadiff Kirwan, Douglas Booth, Charles Edwards, Luca Pasqualino, Rebecca Front, Alexandra Maria Lara, Linus Roache, Violet Braeckman, Sasha Behar, Sid Phoenix, Cornelius Booth and Megan Channell.

=== Filming ===
Principal photography began in September 2025, with filming taking place at the OMA X Film Studios, in Enfield, London. In May 2026, it was announced that the filming of the first series had been wrapped in February and the second series would go into production.

== Release ==
The first series premiered on 1 October 2026 on HBO and 2 October 2026 on Sky Atlantic.

== Reception ==
On the review aggregator website Rotten Tomatoes, the series holds an approval rating of 85%, based on 54 reviews, with an average of rated reviews of 7.4/10. The website's critics consensus reads, "Taking on courtroom proceedings with stylish flair, this heady drama features captivating performances, biting dialogue, and an entertaining premise that proves all's fair in love and WAR." Metacritic, which uses a weighted average, assigned a score of 74 out of 100 based on 27 critics, indicating "generally favorable" reviews.
