= Chloé Hayden =

Australian actress, social media personality, activist and author

- Born: Chloé Sarah Hayden; 23 July 1997 (age 29); Melbourne, Australia
- Occupations: Actress; activist; media personality; podcast host; author
- Years active: 2016–present
- Spouse: Dylan Rohan (m. 2024)

YouTube information
- Channel: Chloé Hayden
- Genres: Autism & ADHD education; vlogging; mental health; reactions; music
- Subscribers: 139 thousand
- Views: 46.4 million
- Last updated: 3 November 2026
- Website: Official website

Chloé Sarah Hayden (born 23 July 1997) is an Australian actress, author, podcast host, social media personality, and an activist in the disability rights movement. After gaining early attention on social media, she became known for her performance of Quinn "Quinni" Gallagher-Jones in the Netflix comedy drama series Heartbreak High, for which she won an AACTA Award and was nominated for two Logie Awards.

Diagnosed as autistic at a young age and later with ADHD, Hayden is also an advocate for women's rights. She published the bestselling memoir Different, Not Less (2022) and hosts the podcast Boldly Me (2023–present).

== Early life and education ==
Chloé Sarah Hayden was born 23 July 1997 in Melbourne. She grew up near the city of Geelong, Victoria.

By the age of 13 she had attended ten different schools and had severe depression and anxiety as a result of severe bullying, leading Hayden to be homeschooled. She was diagnosed as autistic at age 13, and ADHD at age 22. Hayden has also been diagnosed with postural orthostatic tachycardia syndrome, endometriosis, and adenomyosis, and has also stated that she has dyspraxia and dyscalculia.

Hayden has a younger brother who is also autistic, as well as an adopted brother and sister from Taiwan.

== Career ==
Hayden began posting to her YouTube channel in 2016, under the pseudonym Princess Aspien. In 2020, she went viral after she posted a YouTube video criticizing Australian singer Sia's debut film Music for its portrayal of autism. In November 2021, she was cast as Quinni Gallagher-Jones in the Netflix reboot of Heartbreak High. Her character is autistic and was written with her input. This makes Hayden one of the first autistic actors to portray an autistic main character. Hayden herself says that she loves playing an autistic character as she can freely stim.

In August 2022 Hayden released the book Different, Not Less: A Neurodivergent's Guide to Embracing Your True Self and Finding Your Happily Ever After, a part autobiography, part self-help book. Hayden stated, "I wrote this book because I wish I had it when I was diagnosed."

Hayden appeared in the Women of the Year edition of the Australia Marie Claire.

Since April 2023 she has hosted the podcast Boldly Me on Nova, in which she interviews several guests.

== Public image and activism ==
Hayden's performance as Quinni in Heartbreak High was universally well-received, with many commending her for portraying a well-represented autistic character that is not stereotyped.

Hayden wishes to break existing autism stereotypes by talking about her experiences. She has stated, "I see autism as a superpower, if you look at people at the top of their fields, so many of them are on the spectrum."

She is a proponent of autism rights and neurodiversity movements.

In 2023 Hayden and other fans accused Marvel Stadium of ableism after they were barred from a sensory room during a concert for Harry Styles in February 2023. Marvel Stadium then stated that they would be building a second sensory room and retraining their staff.

== Personal life ==
Hayden became engaged to her boyfriend Dylan Rohan in December 2022. They got married on 13 January 2024.

Hayden is a Christian and vegan.

== Awards and nominations ==
| Award | Year | Category | Result | Ref. |
|---|---|---|---|---|
| AACTA Awards | 2022 | Audience Choice Award for Best Actress | Won | |
| AACTA Awards | 2024 | Audience Choice Award for Favourite Australian Media Personality | Nominated | |
| Geelong Youth Awards | 2020 | Youth Disability Inclusion Award | Won | |
| Geelong Youth Awards | 2020 | Young Achiever Award | Won | |
| Logie Awards | 2023 | Graham Kennedy Award for Most Popular New Talent | Nominated | |
| Logie Awards | 2025 | Best Supporting Actress | Nominated | |
| Marie Claire awards | 2022 | Marie Claire Rising Star of the Year | Won | |
| Wego Health Award | 2020 | TikTok Activist | Won | |
| Aspect National Recognition Award | 2019 | N/A | Won | |

== Filmography ==
| Year | Title | Role | Notes |
|---|---|---|---|
| 2017 | Jeremy the Dud | Heidi | Short film |
| 2021 | Sister from the South | Robyn | Short film |
| 2022 | Rostered On – Season 3: Counter Girls | Grace | Miniseries |
| 2022 | Embrace: Kids | Herself | Documentary film |
| 2022 | Frankly | Herself | Panelist |
| 2022–2026 | Heartbreak High | Quinn "Quinni" Gallagher-Jones | Main cast |
| 2023 | Play School | Herself | Featured guest; Episode: "Show Time 2" |
| 2024 | Inside | Tara | |

== Writing ==
- Hayden, Chloé (2022). Different, Not Less: A Neurodivergent's Guide to Embracing Your True Self and Finding Your Happily Ever After. Millers Point, New South Wales: Murdoch Books. ISBN 978-1-922616-18-0. OCLC 1334121296.
