= The F Ward =

- Genre: Medical drama
- Created by: Dan Edwards; Kelsey Munro
- Directed by: Neil Sharma; Natalie Bailey
- Starring: Anna Friel; Ioane Sa'ula; Daniel Wyllie; Lola Bond; Alex Fitzalan; Susie Porter; Jeremy Sims
- Country of origin: Australia
- Original language: English

Production
- Executive producer: John Edwards
- Producers: Dan Edwards; Kelsey Munro
- Production companies: Roadshow Rough Diamond; CBS Studios

Original release
- Network: Stan
- Release: 17 July 2026

The F Ward is an Australian medical drama television series for Stan that premiered on 17 July 2026. The series follows a group of interns sent to an underfunded hospital to better their careers, but they find out they must overcome the challenges and overwhelming expectations of careers in medicine.

The series was renewed for a second season in September 2026.

== Plot ==
Complex interns are sent to the underfunded, under-resourced Pines Hospital, where the interns must overcome the expectations and challenges of their medical careers. They face final chances where the outcomes are life and death stakes.

== Cast and characters ==
On 14 October 2025 the cast for the series was announced, with Anna Friel cast in the lead role. On 15 June 2026 Stan announced further cast for the series with Arka Das, Paula Arundell, Susie Porter, and Jeremy Sims rounding out the cast.

=== Main ===
- Anna Friel as Dr Gloria Wall
- Ioane Sa'ula as Jimmy Seufale
- Daniel Wyllie as Dr Curtis Parker
- Lola Bond as Ellie O'Neill
- Alex Fitzalan as Josh Wilson
- Emily Barclay as Lisa Juracek
- Rishab Kern as Yosef Perera
- Annie Boyle as Ava Foley

=== Supporting ===
- Arka Das as Dr Kush Prasad
- Paula Arundell as Anita Corcoran
- Jeremy Sims as Dr Geoffrey Friedman
- Susie Porter as Pip Mateesi
- Toby Schmitz as Dennis
- Alex Dimitriades as Stefan
- Lilian Alejandra Valverde as Mia Vega Alvarez
- Matthew Backer as Liam Adler

== Production ==
On 15 October 2025 Stan announced that the series was in production with funding secured from Screen Australia and Screen NSW and additional funding from the Made in NSW Television drama fund, Dan Edwards, John Edwards and Bump creator Kelsey Munro on board as producers. The series created more than 550 jobs during the production.

On 15 June 2026 Stan released the trailer for the series, announcing that the series would air all six episodes from 17 July 2026.

== Episodes ==
No. overall	No. in season	Title	Directed by	Written by	Original release date
1	1	"Episode 1"	Natalie Bailey	Kelsey Munro	17 July 2026
2	2	"Episode 2"	Natalie Bailey	Shanti Gudgeon	17 July 2026
3	3	"Episode 3"	Natalie Bailey	Kelsey Munro	17 July 2026
4	4	"Episode 4"	Neil Sharma	Jack Yablsey	17 July 2026
5	5	"Episode 5"	Neil Sharma	Nick Coyle	17 July 2026
6	6	"Episode 6"	Neil Sharma	Kelsey Munro	17 July 2026
