= Sherry-Lee Watson =

Australian actress (born 1998 or 1999)

- Born: 1998 or 1999 (age 27–28); Alice Springs, Northern Territory, Australia
- Education: Victorian College of the Arts
- Occupation: Actress
- Years active: 2022–present
- Known for: Heartbreak High (2022); Thou Shalt Not Steal (2024); My Brilliant Career (2026)

Sherry-Lee Watson (born 1998 or 1999) is an Aboriginal Australian (Arrernte) actress. She is best known for her roles as Missy on the Netflix comedy drama Heartbreak High, Robyn in the Australian comedy series Thou Shalt Not Steal on Stan and as Nell in the Netflix series My Brilliant Career.

== Early life and education ==
Sherry-Lee Watson was born in 1998 or 1999, and grew up in Alice Springs, Northern Territory. She is an Arrernte woman.

She moved from home at the age of 14 to study and pursue a career in arts and acting. Watson attended the Victorian College of the Arts, studying a Bachelor of Fine Arts (Music Theatre).

== Career ==
In November 2021, Watson was cast in Netflix comedy drama Heartbreak High as Missy.

In 2024, Watson starred in Stan original Thou Shalt Not Steal. She appeared alongside Heartbreak High co-star Will McDonald, who she recommended for the role.

In 2026 she was cast as Nell, a horse trainer in 1890s rural Australia who dreams of becoming a foreman of the large estate on which she works, in the Netflix series My Brilliant Career, starring Philippa Northeast and Christopher Chung.

== Recognition and accolades ==
In June 2024, Watson won the inaugural Pedestrian Television Screen Star Of The Year Award, for her performance in Heartbreak High.
