= Kartanya Maynard =

Australian actress

- Born: 1994 or 1995 (age 30–31); Hobart, Tasmania, Australia
- Education: University of Tasmania
- Occupation: Actress
- Years active: 2020–present
- Notable work: Heartbreak High, Deadloch

Kartanya Maynard is an Australian actress, primarily known for her roles in series such as Heartbreak High (2022), Deadloch (2023), and War (2026), among other TV shows, plays and short films.

== Early life ==
Maynard is a Trawlwoolway woman from Hobart (Nipaluna) in Tasmania (Lutruwita), Australia. She was born around 1994 or 1995.

She originally studied a Bachelor of Music at the University of Tasmania, but she began experiencing burnout and tinnitus. This led to her pursuing acting instead. However, she was initially concerned about whether she would be able to get roles, as a plus-size and Indigenous woman, which she had rarely seen represented on-screen before.

== Career ==
Maynard appeared in several Australian television shows in 2023. In the first season of the Amazon Prime black comedy crime series Deadloch, she played a teenager from a small town in Tasmania. She also acted in two ABC TV shows; she appeared in The Messenger, an adaptation of the Markus Zusak novel of the same name, and was a series regular in the comedy show Gold Diggers.

In 2024, Maynard became part of the regular cast of the second season of Heartbreak High. She portrayed the character Zoe Clarke, an opinionated student and abstinence advocate. She continued the role in the third season. Also in 2024, Maynard acted on stage in a Sydney Theatre Company production of Stolen, a play about members of the Stolen Generations of Indigenous children in Australia.

In 2025, it was announced that she would appear in War, a British/American HBO legal drama set in London. This was Maynard's first international role. The show began its release in 2026, with Maynard portraying Suzie, an Australian lawyer working at a British firm.

Outside of acting, she has also worked in creative production on the Netflix series The Survivors.

Maynard wrote a series titled Nailing It! alongside her childhood best friend, Takani Clark, and the pair are in the process of developing it as of 2026. The series received development funding through Screen Australia, SBS and NITV’s Digital Originals program in 2025. Nailing It! tells the story of a young Aboriginal woman who is disconnected from her culture, and who opens a passage to the spiritual realm by accidentally performing a Welcome to Country ceremony incorrectly.

== Awards and honours ==
The Casting Guild of Australia named Maynard as one of their 2023 Rising Stars. She was a finalist for the 2024 Heath Ledger Scholarship.

At the 2024 CinefestOZ in Western Australia, Maynard won Short Film Awards Best Actor, for her leading role in Lean In.

Additionally, she was awarded the Brian Walsh Award for Emerging Talent at the 2025 AACTA awards. This award comes with $50,000 towards furthering her career, as well as mentorship. She used the support from this prize to help her secure a UK visa, which allowed her to gain her role in War.

== Filmography ==
Year	Title	Role	Notes
2020	The Bleeding Tree	Ada	
2022	Lean In	Rach	Short film
2023	Deadloch	Miranda Hopkins	Series regular
2023	The Messenger	Ritchie	Lead role
2023	Gold Diggers	Molly	Series regular
2024	Stolen	Ruby	Theatre
2024-2025	Heartbreak High	Zoe Clarke	Series regular; season 2 and 3 only
2025	Cooee	Torana	Feature film
2026	War	Suzie Levitnik	Series regular
