= James Majoos =

Australian actor

- Born: 2 October 1997 (age 28)
- Occupation: Actor
- Years active: 2022–present
- Television: Heartbreak High

James Majoos (born 2 October 1997) is an Australian actor. They gained recognition for their lead role as Darren Rivers in the Netflix comedy drama series Heartbreak High (2022–2026). The role earned them a nomination for the AACTA Award for Best Lead Actor in a Television Drama.

On stage, they appeared in Sydney Theatre Company's Grand Horizons and Belvoir's Fangirls.

== Awards ==
For their performance in Heartbreak High, they were nominated for the 2022 AACTA Award for Best Lead Actor in a Television Drama.

== Personal life ==
Majoos has South African ancestry and identifies as non-binary. Majoos uses he/him and they/them pronouns.

== Filmography ==
Year	Title	Role	Notes
2022–2026	Heartbreak High	Darren Rivers	Main cast

== Theatrical Credits ==
Year(s)	Title	Role	Theatre	Director	Notes
2019	FANGIRLS	Saltypringl & others u/s Harry	First Australian Tour	Yve Blake	Part of the 2019 Brisbane Festival season
2020	Everybody's Talking About Jamie	Jamie	Australian Tour	Matt Ryan	Cancelled due to the effects of the COVID-19 pandemic
2021	FANGIRLS	Saltypringl & others	Second Australian Tour	Yve Blake	
2021	Grand Horizons	Tommy	Roslyn Packer Theatre	Jessica Arthur	

== Awards and nominations ==
Year	Award	Category	Result	Ref.
2022	12th AACTA Awards	Best Lead Actor in Drama	Nominated	
