= Muster Dogs =

Australian dog television series

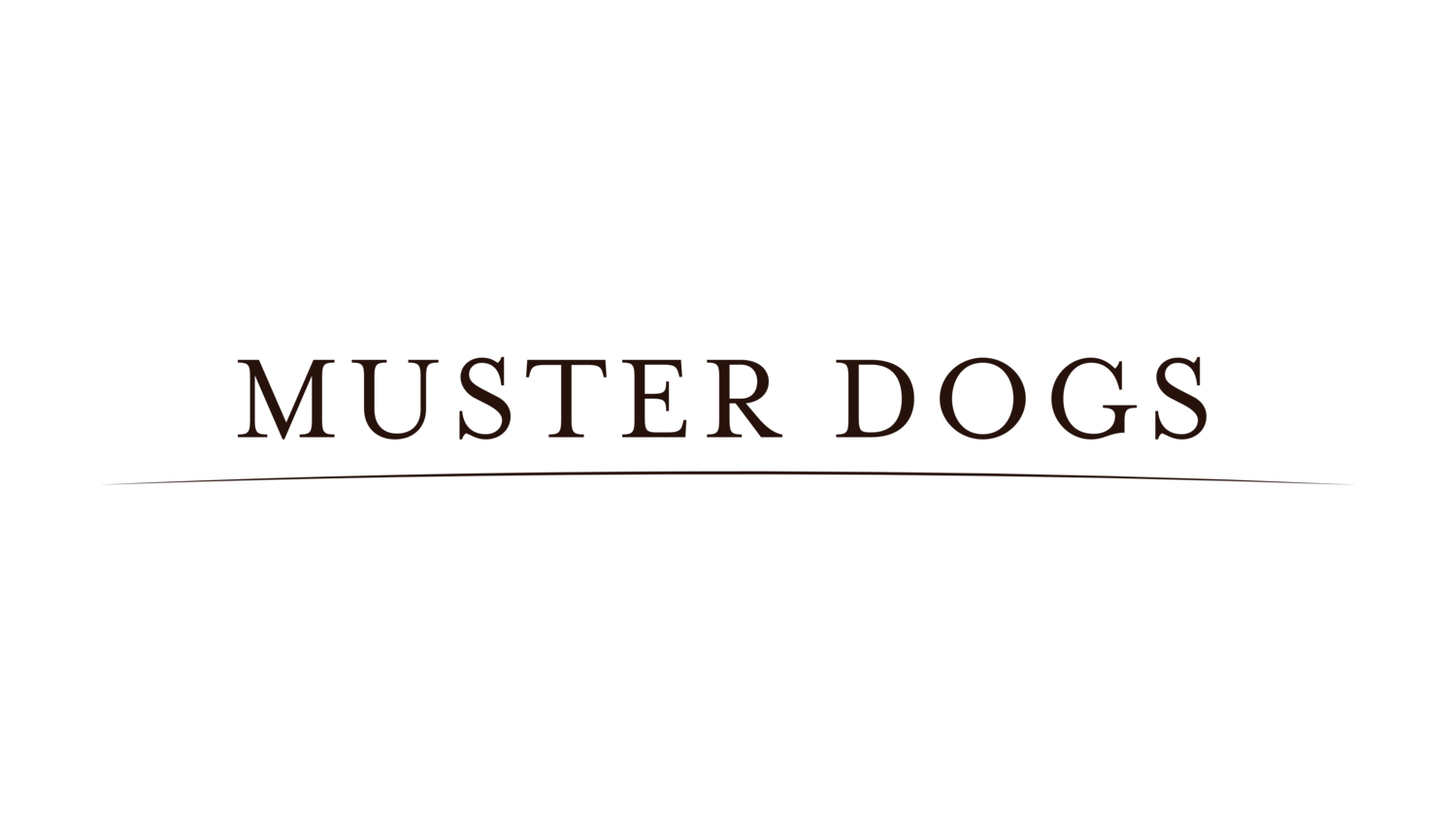
- Genre: Documentary; Reality television
- Created by: Michael Boughen
- Directed by: Sally Browning; Monica O'Brien; Michael Boughen
- Narrated by: Lisa Millar
- Country of origin: Australia
- Original language: English
- No. of seasons: 4
- No. of episodes: 21

Production
- Executive producer: Matthew Street

Original release
- Network: ABC TV
- Release: 23 January 2022 – present

Muster Dogs is an Australian animal documentary and reality television series created by Michael Boughen for the Australian Broadcasting Corporation.

== Summary ==
=== Season 1 ===
Produced by Ambience Entertainment, the first season premiered on ABC TV and ABC iview on 23 January 2022. This was despite the ABC originally announcing the program in late 2020, as part of its slate of programming scheduled to air in 2021.

The first season showcases the journey of five Australian Kelpie puppies as they are trained to become muster dogs on farms across Australia under the guidance of expert dog trainers Neil and Helen McDonald. The first season was met with positive reviews.

The first series was won by "Annie", trained by Queensland grazier Frank Finger.

=== Season 2 ===
Following the positive reception of the first season, production of a second season featuring Border Collie puppies was announced released and premiered on 14 January 2024.

The second season was won by "Buddy", trained by Zoe Miller of the Northern Territory.

=== Season 3 and a special ===
In March 2024, it was announced that Muster Dogs had been renewed for a third season, with six episodes scheduled to air in 2025, with both kelpies and border collies to be featured. In July 2024, auditions were opened for dog training for the third season.

On 1 December 2024, a four-part special, Muster Dogs: Where Are They Now, presented by series narrator Lisa Millar, debuted on ABC TV. The special featured five previous human and canine participants from Muster Dogs: season 1 winners Frank and Annie, Joni and Chet, Cilla and Ash, along with season 2 winner Zoe and Buddy, and Russ and his Border Collie Molly.

Season 3, Muster Dogs: Collies & Kelpies was won by "Banjo", trained by Kim Dodson from Victoria, revealed in the final episode aired in March 2025.

== Impact and books ==
Millar has spoken at length about the surprising success of the show and how it has become the highlight of her career.

Two companion books to the series have been published. Muster Dogs by Aticia Grey was published in November 2021. Muster Dogs: From Pups to Pros, written by series narrator Lisa Millar, was published in January 2024.

== Graziers ==
=== Season 1 ===
Grazier	Hometown	Dog	Result
Frank Finger	Clermont	Annie	Winner
Aticia Grey	Western Australia	Gossip	Lost
Rob Tuncks	Victoria	Lucifer	Lost
Joni Hall	Northern Territory	Chet	Lost
Catherine Scotney	Northern Territory	Spice	Lost

=== Season 2 ===
Grazier	Hometown	Dog	Result
Zoe Miller	Northern Territory	Buddy	Winner
Cilla	Gympie	Ash	Lost
Lily	Wilcannia	Snow	Lost
Russ	Tasmania	Molly	Lost
Steve	Winton	Indi	Lost

=== Season 3 ===
Grazier	Hometown	Dog	Result
Kim Dodson	Victoria	Banjo	Winner
Jack Kennedy	Victoria	Pesto	Lost
Renee Spencer	Queensland	Pockets	Lost
Blythe Calnan	Western Australia	Banksi	Lost
Marlene Brewer	New South Wales	Hudson	Lost
Nathan Obst	Queensland	Chief	Lost

=== Season 4 ===
Grazier	Hometown	Dog	Result
Courtney Moir	Wellstead, WA	Blossom	Winner
Ian Worley	Nundie, NSW	Buruma	Lost
Max Hudson	King Island, Tas	Roxy	Lost
Rex Grey-McCormack	Broome, WA	Alfie	Lost
Shaydie-Jane Campbell	Taroom, Qld	Turner	Lost
Sam Mackaway	Walcha, NSW	Captain	

== Reception ==
=== Critical reception ===
In a positive review, Graeme Blundell of The Australian wrote, "Muster Dogs is simply delightful TV as well as being thoughtful, engaged and cast with a bunch of wonderful characters from the land, their laid-back humour coloured with a hard, sceptical and sombre undertone. ... They are the five farming families, on properties ranging from the red earth of the Top End to the green pastures of regional Victoria, who take on the challenge of training new kelpie pups and testing their worth on the properties they run." In a 2022 review, Melinda Houston of The Sydney Morning Herald wrote, "It's sort of a competition to see who can best train a working dog pup in just 12 months, but the more interesting face of the show is the insight into the dogs themselves, the people who breed and train them, and the farmers who work them." David Knox of TV Tonight wrote, "These pups all come from the same litter, a lineage of trained dogs, but can they all be trained when they are split up and given to new owners?". Margaret Lyons of The New York Times wrote "you need some inspiration for naming a new dog in your life, look no further than this unscripted Australian series, which includes dogs named Jumpy, Lucifer, Gossip and Trunk. “Muster” follows five kelpie puppies given to five ranchers, reconvening after one year to see which dog's herding skills are the most advanced. But the show is much more about the journey than the destination".

=== Awards ===
Year	Award	Category	Nominee(s)	Result	Ref.
2022	AACTA Awards	Best Factual Entertainment Program	Muster Dogs Season 1	Nominated	
2022	AACTA Awards	Best Editing in Television	Muster Dogs Season 1 - Episode 1	Nominated	
2023	Screen Producers Australia Awards	Documentary Series Production of the Year	Muster Dogs Season 1	Won	
2024	TV Week Logies	Best Structured Reality Program	Muster Dogs Season 2	Nominated	
2025	AACTA Awards	Best Factual Entertainment Program	Muster Dogs Season 2	Won	
2025	AACTA Awards	Best Direction in Nonfiction Television	Muster Dogs Season 2 - Episode 3	Won	
2025	Screen Producers Australia Awards	Documentary Series Production of the Year	Muster Dogs Season 2	Nominated	
2025	TV Week Logies	Best Structured Reality Program	Muster Dogs: Collies and Kelpies	Won	
2025	TV Week Logies	Gold Logie - Most Popular Personality on Australian Television	Lisa Millar - Muster Dogs & Muster Dogs: Where Are They Now	Nominated	

== Episodes ==
=== Season 1 ===
No. overall	No. in season	Title	Original release date	Viewers
1	1	"Episode 1"	23 January 2022	604,000
2	2	"Episode 2"	30 January 2022	421,000
3	3	"Episode 3"	6 February 2022	549,000
4	4	"Episode 4"	13 February 2022	574,000

=== Season 2 ===
No. overall	No. in season	Title	Original release date	Aus. viewers
5	1	"Episode 1"	14 January 2024	534,000
6	2	"Episode 2"	21 January 2024	429,000
7	3	"Episode 3"	28 January 2024	1,110,000
8	4	"Episode 4"	4 February 2024	1,171,000
9	5	"Episode 5"	11 February 2024	773,000

=== Season 3 ===
No. overall	No. in season	Title	Original release date	Aus. viewers
10	1	"Episode 1"	2 February 2025	1,238,000
11	2	"Episode 2"	9 February 2025	1,160,000
12	3	"Episode 3"	16 February 2025	1,069,0000
13	4	"Episode 4"	23 February 2025	1,103,000
14	5	"Episode 5"	2 March 2025	1,103,000
15	6	"Episode 6"	9 March 2025	1,103,000

=== Season 4 ===
No. overall	No. in season	Title	Original release date	Aus. viewers
16	1	"Episode 1"	1 February 2026	1,338,000
17	2	"Episode 2"	8 February 2026	1,260,000
18	3	"Episode 3"	15 February 2026	1,169,0000
19	4	"Episode 4"	22 February 2026	1,203,000
20	5	"Episode 5"	1 March 2026	1,203,000
21	6	"Episode 6"	8 March 2026	1,203,000

Note: From 28 January 2024, OzTAM ratings changed from Total Reach reporting to National Reach reporting. Muster Dogs reached a national audience of 1,110,000 viewers.
