= Gemma Chua-Tran =

Actress and photographer

- Chua-Tran in 2023
- Born: August 18, 2001 (age 25); Sydney, New South Wales, Australia
- Occupation: Actress
- Years active: 2015-present

Gemma Chua-Tran is an Australian actress and photographer. She is known for her television work, including roles in Mustangs FC and Heartbreak High. She has also appeared in film productions including Back of the Net and Kung Fu Deadly.

== Early life ==
Chua-Tran was born in Sydney, New south Wales, on August 18, 2001. Chua-Tran's parents migrated to Australia, and she is of Chinese descent. Chua-Tran uses she/they pronouns.

== Filmography ==
=== Television ===
- Mustangs FC
- Anusha
- Heartbreak High
- Ladies in Black
- Dustfall
- Diary of an Uber Driver

=== Film ===
- Back of the Net
- Kung Fu Deadly

=== Animation ===
- Lesbian Space Princess

=== Unreleased ===
In early 2026, it was announced that Chua-Tran would act in the upcoming Netflix series Gundam.
