= Soft reboot =

Soft reboot may refer to:

- A warm reboot, where a computer system restarts without the need to interrupt the power
- A soft reboot (fiction), in which a certain degree of continuity is retained
