= Bump (Australian TV series) =

2021 Australian comedy-drama series

- Genre: Comedy drama
- Created by: Claudia Karvan; Kelsey Munro
- Written by: Kelsey Munro; Jessica Tuckwell; Timothy Lee; Steven Arriagada; Mithila Gupta
- Directed by: Geoff Bennett; Gracie Otto; Leticia Cáceres
- Starring: Claudia Karvan; Nathalie Morris; Carlos Sanson Jnr; Angus Sampson; Safia Arain
- Country of origin: Australia
- Original languages: English; Spanish
- No. of seasons: 5
- No. of episodes: 50

Production
- Executive producer: Chris Chard
- Producers: Claudia Karvan; Daniel Edwards; John Edwards
- Camera setup: Single-camera
- Running time: 30 minutes
- Production company: Roadshow Rough Diamond

Original release
- Network: Stan
- Release: 1 January 2021 – 30 November 2025

Bump is an Australian comedy drama television series created by Claudia Karvan and Kelsey Munro, which premiered on Stan on 1 January 2021. The story centres on a high-achieving teenage girl and her boyfriend, both still at school, who have a surprise baby, and the complications that ensue for them, their extended families, and friends.

The second season premiered on 26 December 2021, the third on 26 December 2022, and the fourth on 26 December 2023. The fifth and final season was released on 26 December 2024. Bump: A Christmas film, which serves as a conclusion to the series, was released on 30 November 2025. A spin-off series, titled Year Of, was released on 9 June 2023.

== Synopsis ==
Set in and around an inner city high school, the ten-part first series centres around Oly, an ambitious and high-achieving teenage girl who has a surprise baby, and the complications that ensue for two families.

== Cast and characters ==
- Nathalie Morris as Olympia 'Oly' Chalmers-Davis
- Carlos Sanson Jnr as Santiago 'Santi' Hernández
- Claudia Karvan as Angie Davis
- Angus Sampson as Dom Chalmers
- Ricardo Scheihing Vásquez as Matías Hernández
- Ava Cannon as Jacinda Hernández Chalmers-Davis
- Anita Hegh as Edith Chalmers
- Christian Byers as Bowie Chalmers-Davis
- Safia Arain as Reema
- Ioane Sa'ula as Vince Ingram
- Catalina Palma Godoy as Ángel
- Paula García as Rosa Hernández
- Peter Thurnwald as Lachie Koh
- Roman Delo as Zac Russo
- Sarah Meacham as Madison
- Claudia de Giusti as Bernadita
- Miguel Andrade as Alejandro
- Ryan Johnson as Tim

== Episodes ==
=== Series overview ===
Series	Episodes	Originally released
1	10	1 January 2021
2	10	26 December 2021
3	10	26 December 2022
4	10	26 December 2023
5	10	26 December 2024
Film		30 November 2025

=== Season 1 (2021) ===
No. overall	No. in season	Title	Directed by	Written by	Original release date
1	1	"¡Sorpresa!"	Geoff Bennett	Kelsey Munro	1 January 2021
2	2	"The Startle Reflex"	Geoff Bennett	Kelsey Munro and Steven Arriagada (story by)	1 January 2021
3	3	"Relative Strangers"	Geoff Bennett	Jessica Tuckwell	1 January 2021
4	4	"Sin Salida"	Geoff Bennett	Timothy Lee	1 January 2021
5	5	"#oleema"	Gracie Otto	Mithila Gupta	1 January 2021
6	6	"Limerence"	Gracie Otto	Jessica Tuckwell	1 January 2021
7	7	"Driftwood"	Gracie Otto	Steven Arriagada	1 January 2021
8	8	"The Strange Situation"	Leticia Cáceres	Jessica Tuckwell	1 January 2021
9	9	"All Happy Families"	Leticia Cáceres	Timothy Lee	1 January 2021
10	10	"Matrescence"	Leticia Cáceres	Kelsey Munro	1 January 2021

=== Season 2 (2021) ===
No. overall	No. in season	Title	Directed by	Written by	Original release date
11	1	"Daddy Sleepover"	Geoff Bennett	Kelsey Munro	26 December 2021
12	2	"Tickle Time Part 1"	Geoff Bennett	Jessica Tuckwell	26 December 2021
13	3	"Silencio"	Geoff Bennett	Timothy Lee	26 December 2021
14	4	"Superwoman"	Matthew Moore	Mithila Gupta	26 December 2021
15	5	"Just Kids"	Matthew Moore	Kelsey Munro	26 December 2021
16	6	"AITA"	Jessica Tuckwell	Jessica Tuckwell	26 December 2021
17	7	"Strays"	Matthew Moore	Steven Arriagada	26 December 2021
18	8	"Birds of a Feather"	Leticia Cáceres	Fernanda Peñaloza & Jessica Tuckwell	26 December 2021
19	9	"Tickle Time Part 2"	Leticia Cáceres	Jessica Tuckwell	26 December 2021
20	10	"Love v Freedom"	Leticia Cáceres	Kelsey Munro	26 December 2021

=== Season 3 (2022) ===
No. overall	No. in season	Title	Directed by	Written by	Original release date
21	1	"First Day"	Kriv Stenders	Kelsey Munro	26 December 2022
22	2	"Caring Gives You Cancer"	Kriv Stenders	Jessica Tuckwell	26 December 2022
23	3	"Jellyfish"	Kriv Stenders	Nick Coyle	26 December 2022
24	4	"The Argentine"	Kriv Stenders	Kelsey Munro	26 December 2022
25	5	"Feliz Dia de la Madre!"	Geoff Bennett	Jessica Redenbach & Timothy Lee	26 December 2022
26	6	"Can’t We Just Have A Few Nice Things"	Geoff Bennett	Jessica Tuckwell	26 December 2022
27	7	"The Owl and the Pussycat"	Geoff Bennett	Nick Coyle	26 December 2022
28	8	"Love in the Time of Chaos"	Margie Beattie	Fernanda Peñaloza & Jessica Tuckwell	26 December 2022
29	9	"Parents of the Year"	Rebecca O'Brien	Kelsey Munro	26 December 2022
30	10	"No Fairytales"	Rebecca O'Brien	Kelsey Munro	26 December 2022

=== Season 4 (2023) ===
No. overall	No. in season	Title	Directed by	Written by	Original release date
31	1	"Work"	Geoff Bennett	Kelsey Munro; Claudia Karvan	26 December 2023
32	2	"2"	Geoff Bennett	Nick Coyle; Kelsey Munro; Claudia Karvan	26 December 2023
33	3	"Would You Rather?"	Geoff Bennett	Jorrden Daley; Kelsey Munro; Claudia Karvan	26 December 2023
34	4	"Both On Three..."	Ismail Khan	Timothy Lee; Kelsey Munro; Claudia Karvan	26 December 2023
35	5	"La Hora Loca"	Margie Beattie	Kelsey Munro; Claudia Karvan	26 December 2023
36	6	"Dating"	Margie Beattie	Nick Coyle; Kelsey Munro; Claudia Karvan	26 December 2023
37	7	"Talk It Out"	Margie Beattie	Chika Ikogwe; Kelsey Munro; Claudia Karvan	26 December 2023
38	8	"Jeffurry"	Rebecca O'Brien	Shanti Gudgeon; Kelsey Munro; Claudia Karvan	26 December 2023
39	9	"The Styx Valley"	Rebecca O'Brien	Kelsey Munro; Claudia Karvan	26 December 2023
40	10	"Toilet Baby"	Rebecca O'Brien	Kelsey Munro; Claudia Karvan	26 December 2023

=== Season 5 (2024) ===
No. overall	No. in season	Title	Directed by	Written by	Original release date
41	1	"Dog Day"	Margie Beattie	Kelsey Munro	26 December 2024
42	2	"Prophecy"	Margie Beattie	Nick Coyle	26 December 2024
43	3	"A Hand-Shaped Balloon"	Margie Beattie	Kelsey Munro	26 December 2024
44	4	"In Records"	Margie Beattie	Timothy Lee	26 December 2024
45	5	"Gemini Sun"	Ismail Khan	Shanti Gudgeon; Nathalie Morris	26 December 2024
46	6	"A Cup of Tea"	Ismail Khan	Nick Coyle	26 December 2024
47	7	"Pivots"	Ismail Khan	Nick Coyle	26 December 2024
48	8	"Magpie"	Rebecca O'Brien	Kelsey Munro	26 December 2024
49	9	"Cinders"	Rebecca O'Brien; Joelene Crnogorac	Shanti Gudgeon	26 December 2024
50	10	"Rebirth"	Rebecca O'Brien; Joelene Crnogorac	Kelsey Munro	26 December 2024

=== Film (2025) ===
On 18 February 2025, Stan announced Bump: A Christmas Film was in production. The film is set in between episodes 9 and 10 of the fifth season, with Claudia Karvan, Nathalie Morris and Carlos Sanson Jnr returning for the film. It was announced that the film would release on 30 November 2025 on Stan.

Title	Directed by	Written by	Original release date
Bump: A Christmas Film	Margie Beattie	Kelsey Munro	30 November 2025

== Production ==
The series was co-created by Claudia Karvan and Kelsey Munro, who also co-wrote with a writing team of Jessica Tuckwell, Timothy Lee, Mithila Gupta, and Steven Arriagada. Karvan produced the series along with John Edwards and Dan Edwards. Geoff Bennett, Gracie Otto, and Leticia Cáceres directed the series.

The first season of the series had to adhere to strict COVID-19 protocols, as it was shot in 2020.

The series ran for five seasons and ended on the creators' own terms. Nathalie Morris, who portrayed the lead role of Oly in the series, made her screenwriting debut in the fifth season.

== Release ==
Bump premiered on Stan on 1 January 2021. In July 2021 it was confirmed that production on the second season was under way in Sydney and that a third season had also been confirmed. On 25 November 2021 a trailer for the second season was released along with an announcement that the season was scheduled to be released on 26 December 2021.

The third season premiered on 26 December 2022. A spin-off series set in the same universe, Year Of, was released on 9 June 2023.

The fourth season of Bump went into production in July 2023 and was released on 26 December 2023.

It was renewed for a fifth season on 12 March 2024. Production for the fifth and final season commenced in July 2024 and was released on 26 December 2024.

On 7 October 2025 Bump began airing on the Nine Network.

== Ratings ==
=== Series One ===
No.	Title	Air Date	Free To Air	Viewers	Ref
1	Sorpresa!	1 January 2021	7 October 2025	421,000	
2	The Startle Reflex	1 January 2021	14 October 2025	376,000	
3	Relative Strangers	1 January 2021	21 October 2025	246,000	
4	Sin Salida	1 January 2021	28 October 2025		
5	#oleema	1 January 2021			
6	Limerence	1 January 2021			
7	Driftwood	1 January 2021			
8	The Strange Situation	1 January 2021			
9	All Happy Families	1 January 2021			
10	Matrescence	1 January 2021			

== International broadcasts ==
On 18 June 2021, Canada's CBC premiered the first season of Bump on its CBC Gem streaming service, adding the second season on 29 July 2022. In the United Kingdom, the series began airing on BBC One on 20 October 2021.

In March 2022, the series was picked by The CW in the United States, premiering on 11 August 2022. The network however removed it from its schedule after broadcasting five episodes of the second season in September 2023.

In Portugal, it is broadcast on RTP2.

International Broadcasters
Territory	Channel
Africa	MNET, Showmax, SABC
Canada	CBC
Czech Republic	TV Nova
Denmark	C More
Ireland	Virgin Media
Finland	C More
Germany	ProSieben
Greece	Cosmote TV
Iceland	Stöð 2
Indonesia	Pro Ventures
Israel	Free TV, HOT
Korea	KT
Latvia	LMT, TV3
Lithuania	Telia Lietuva
Malaysia	Pro Ventures
Malta	GO TV
Middle East	OSN TV
New Zealand	Sky NZ
Norway	TV 2
Pan Baltics	TV3
Pan Benelux	Prime Video
Pan Latin America	HBO Max
Portugal	RTP2
Singapore	Pro Ventures
Spain	ETB
Sweden	C More
Turkey	TV+
UK	BBC, Virgin Airways
USA	CW
