= List of accolades received by Hacksaw Ridge =

Hacksaw Ridge accolades
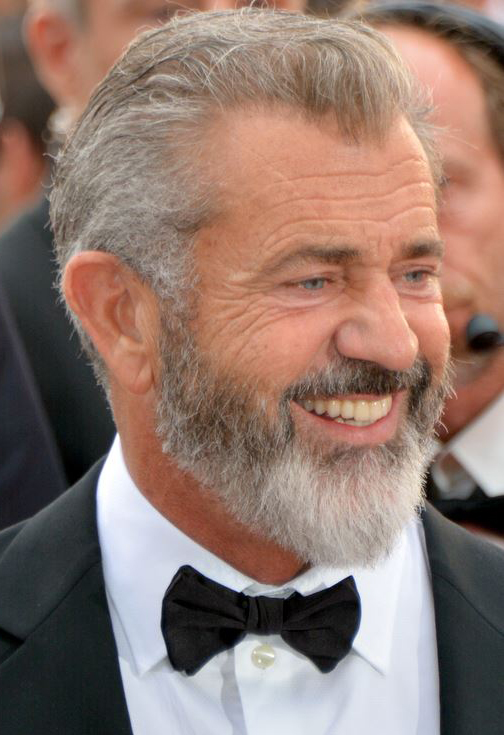
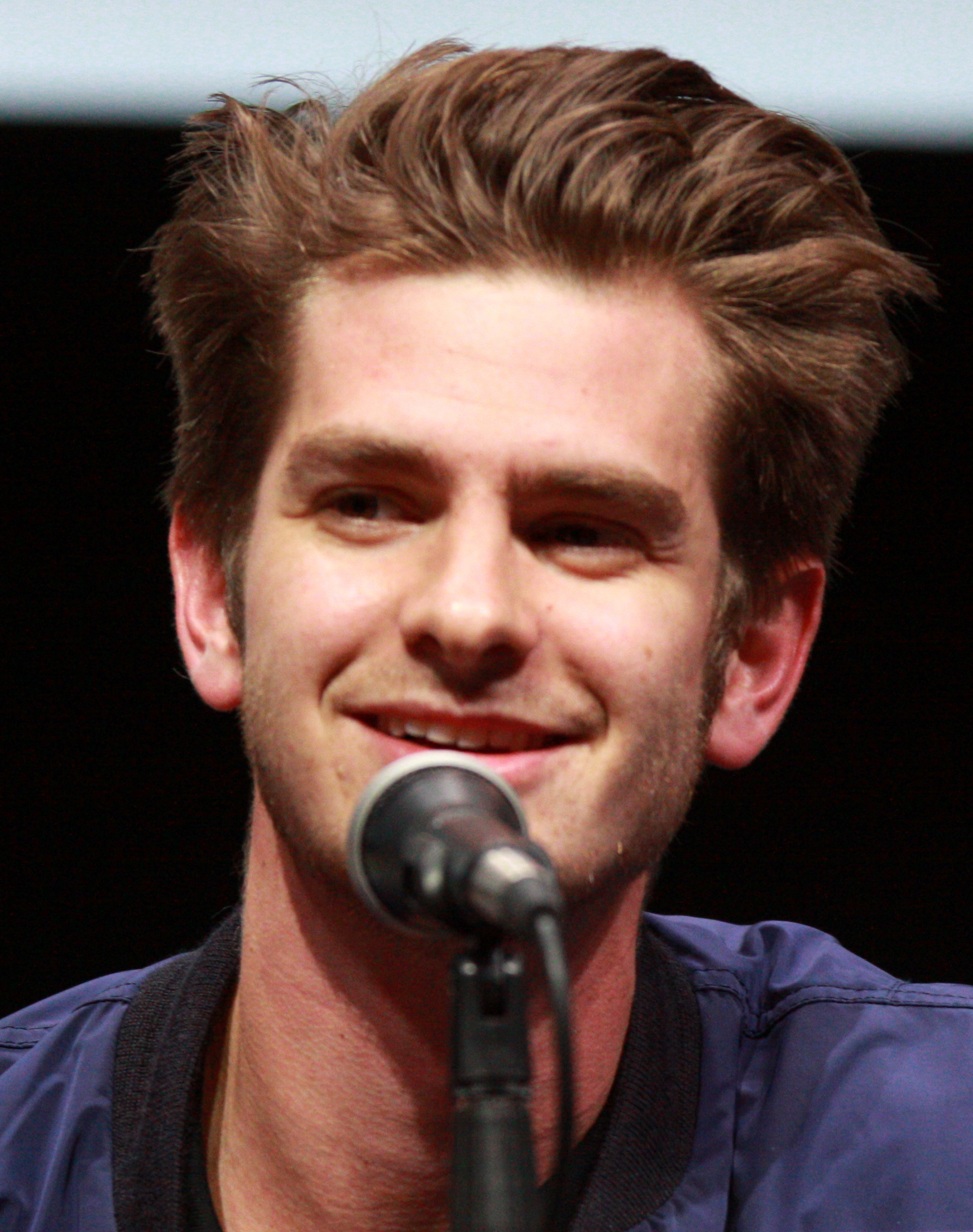
- Mel Gibson received several awards and nominations for his direction, as did Andrew Garfield for his performance.
Awards and nominations
Award	Wins	Nominations
AACTA Awards	9	13
AACTA International Awards	1	5
Academy Awards	2	6
American Cinema Editors Eddie Awards	0	1
American Film Institute Awards	1	1
AFCA Film Awards	0	7
Art Directors Guild Awards	0	1
Boston Society of Film Critics Awards	0	1
British Academy Film Awards	1	5
Camerimage Awards	0	1
Capri Hollywood International Film Festival Awards	5	5
Christopher Awards	1	1
Cinema Audio Society Awards	0	1
Cinema for Peace Awards	1	1
Critics' Choice Movie Awards	2	7
Dallas–Fort Worth Film Critics Association Awards	1	1
Detroit Film Critics Society Awards	0	1
Georgia Film Critics Association Awards	0	2
Golden Globe Awards	0	3
Golden Raspberry Awards	1	1
Golden Reel Awards	2	3
Hollywood Film Awards	3	3
Hollywood Music in Media Awards	0	1
Houston Film Critics Society Awards	0	1
Humanitas Prize	1	1
Irish Film & Television Awards	0	2
Location Managers Guild Awards	0	1
London Film Critics' Circle Awards	1	2
National Board of Review Awards	1	1
Palm Springs International Film Festival Awards	1	1
Producers Guild of America Awards	0	1
Santa Barbara International Film Festival Awards	1	1
Satellite Awards	3	9
Saturn Awards	0	1
Screen Actors Guild Awards	1	2
SOC Awards	0	1
St. Louis Film Critics Association Awards	1	2
Taurus World Stunt Awards	3	3
Teen Choice Awards	0	1
Washington D.C. Area Film Critics Association Awards	0	1

Totals (Note: Certain award groups do not simply award one winner. They acknowledge several different recipients, have runners-up, and have third place. Since this is a specific recognition and is different from losing an award, runner-up mentions are considered wins in this award tally. For simplification and to avoid errors, each award in this list has been presumed to have had a prior nomination.)
- Wins: 43
- Nominations: 102

Hacksaw Ridge is a 2016 biographical war film, directed by Mel Gibson from a screenplay by Andrew Knight and Robert Schenkkan, and based on the 2004 documentary The Conscientious Objector by Terry Benedict. The film depicts the World War II experiences of Desmond Doss, an American combat medic in the United States Army who, as a Seventh-day Adventist, refused to carry or use weapons of any kind. He became the first conscientious objector to be awarded the Medal of Honor, for saving an estimated 75 men during the Battle of Okinawa. Hacksaw Ridge stars Andrew Garfield as Doss, with Sam Worthington, Luke Bracey, Teresa Palmer, Hugo Weaving, Rachel Griffiths, Vince Vaughn and Richard Pyros in supporting roles.

Hacksaw Ridge premiered at the 73rd Venice International Film Festival on September 4, 2016, where it received a 10-minute standing ovation. It was released theatrically in Australia and New Zealand on November 3, 2016, the United States on November 4, China on December 8, and the United Kingdom on January 27, 2017. Produced on a budget of $40 million, Hacksaw Ridge grossed $180 million worldwide. The film received critical acclaim and was seen as a comeback for Gibson, who had been embroiled in several controversies. On the review aggregator website Rotten Tomatoes, the film holds an approval rating of 84% based on 280 reviews.

Hacksaw Ridge garnered awards and nominations in numerous categories, with particular recognition for Gibson's direction and Garfield's performance, as well as its editing and sound effects. It received six nominations at the 89th Academy Awards, winning Best Film Editing and Best Sound Mixing. At the 70th British Academy Film Awards, the film received five nominations, winning Best Editing. Hacksaw Ridge was nominated for Best Motion Picture – Drama, Best Actor in a Motion Picture – Drama (Garfield) and Best Director (Gibson) at the 74th Golden Globe Awards. It also received five nominations at the 22nd Critics' Choice Awards, winning Best Action Movie and Best Actor in an Action Movie (Garfield). The film garnered nine nominations at the 21st Satellite Awards, winning Best Actor (Garfield), Best Film Editing and Best Sound. Hacksaw Ridge was named one of the Top 10 Films of 2016 by both the American Film Institute and National Board of Review.

== Accolades ==
Accolades received by Hacksaw Ridge
Award	Date of ceremony	Category	Recipient(s)	Result	Ref.
AACTA Awards	December 7, 2016	Best Film	Bill Mechanic, David Permut, Paul Currie and Bruce Davey	Won	
AACTA Awards	December 7, 2016	Best Direction	Mel Gibson	Won	
AACTA Awards	December 7, 2016	Best Original Screenplay	Andrew Knight and Robert Schenkkan	Won	
AACTA Awards	December 7, 2016	Best Actor	Andrew Garfield	Won	
AACTA Awards	December 7, 2016	Best Actress	Teresa Palmer	Nominated	
AACTA Awards	December 7, 2016	Best Supporting Actor	Hugo Weaving	Won	
AACTA Awards	December 7, 2016	Best Supporting Actress	Rachel Griffiths	Nominated	
AACTA Awards	December 7, 2016	Best Cinematography	Simon Duggan	Won	
AACTA Awards	December 7, 2016	Best Editing	John Gilbert	Won	
AACTA Awards	December 7, 2016	Best Sound	Andy Wright, Robert Mackenzie, Kevin O'Connell, Mario Vaccaro, Tara Webb and Peter Grace	Won	
AACTA Awards	December 7, 2016	Best Production Design	Barry Robinson	Won	
AACTA Awards	December 7, 2016	Best Costume Design	Lizzy Gardiner	Nominated	
AACTA Awards	December 7, 2016	Best Hair and Makeup	Shane Thomas and Larry Van Duynhoven	Nominated	
AACTA International Awards	January 8, 2017	Best Film	Hacksaw Ridge	Nominated	
AACTA International Awards	January 8, 2017	Best Direction	Mel Gibson	Won	
AACTA International Awards	January 8, 2017	Best Actor	Andrew Garfield	Nominated	
AACTA International Awards	January 8, 2017	Best Supporting Actress	Teresa Palmer	Nominated	
AACTA International Awards	January 8, 2017	Best Screenplay	Andrew Knight and Robert Schenkkan	Nominated	
Academy Awards	February 26, 2017	Best Picture	Bill Mechanic and David Permut	Nominated	
Academy Awards	February 26, 2017	Best Director	Mel Gibson	Nominated	
Academy Awards	February 26, 2017	Best Actor	Andrew Garfield	Nominated	
Academy Awards	February 26, 2017	Best Film Editing	John Gilbert	Won	
Academy Awards	February 26, 2017	Best Sound Editing	Robert Mackenzie and Andy Wright	Nominated	
Academy Awards	February 26, 2017	Best Sound Mixing	Peter Grace, Robert Mackenzie, Kevin O'Connell and Andy Wright	Won	
ACE Eddie Awards	January 27, 2017	Best Edited Feature Film – Dramatic	John Gilbert	Nominated	
American Film Institute Awards	December 7, 2016	Top 10 Films of the Year	Hacksaw Ridge	Won (Note: This award does not have a single winner, but recognizes multiple films.)	
AFCA Film Awards	March 7, 2017	Best Film	Hacksaw Ridge	Nominated	
AFCA Film Awards	March 7, 2017	Best Director	Mel Gibson	Nominated	
AFCA Film Awards	March 7, 2017	Best Actor	Andrew Garfield	Nominated	
AFCA Film Awards	March 7, 2017	Best Actress	Teresa Palmer	Nominated	
AFCA Film Awards	March 7, 2017	Best Supporting Actor	Vince Vaughn	Nominated	
AFCA Film Awards	March 7, 2017	Best Supporting Actor	Hugo Weaving	Nominated	
AFCA Film Awards	March 7, 2017	Best Cinematography	Simon Duggan	Nominated	
Art Directors Guild Awards	February 11, 2017	Excellence in Production Design for a Period Film	Barry Robinson	Nominated	
Boston Society of Film Critics Awards	December 11, 2016	Best Editing	John Gilbert	Nominated	
British Academy Film Awards	February 12, 2017	Best Actor in a Leading Role	Andrew Garfield	Nominated	
British Academy Film Awards	February 12, 2017	Best Adapted Screenplay	Andrew Knight and Robert Schenkkan	Nominated	
British Academy Film Awards	February 12, 2017	Best Editing	John Gilbert	Won	
British Academy Film Awards	February 12, 2017	Best Sound	Peter Grace, Robert Mackenzie, Kevin O'Connell and Andy Wright	Nominated	
British Academy Film Awards	February 12, 2017	Best Makeup and Hair	Shane Thomas	Nominated	
Camerimage Awards	November 19, 2016	Golden Frog	Simon Duggan	Nominated	
Capri Hollywood International Film Festival Awards	January 2, 2017	Best Drama	Hacksaw Ridge	Won	
Capri Hollywood International Film Festival Awards	January 2, 2017	Best Actor	Andrew Garfield	Won	
Capri Hollywood International Film Festival Awards	January 2, 2017	Best Director	Mel Gibson	Won	
Capri Hollywood International Film Festival Awards	January 2, 2017	Best Editing	John Gilbert	Won	
Capri Hollywood International Film Festival Awards	January 2, 2017	Best Producer	Bill Mechanic	Won	
CEC Medals	January 30, 2017	Best Foreign Film	Hackshaw Ridge	Won	
Christopher Awards	May 16, 2017	Feature Films	Hackshaw Ridge	Won	
Cinema Audio Society Awards	February 18, 2017	Outstanding Achievement in Sound Mixing for a Motion Picture – Live Action	Alex Francis, Peter Grace, Daniel Kresco, Robert Mackenzie, Kevin O'Connell, Diego Ruiz and Andy Wright	Nominated	
Cinema for Peace Awards	February 13, 2017	Cinema for Peace Award for The Most Valuable Film of the Year	Hacksaw Ridge	Won	
Critics' Choice Movie Awards	December 11, 2016	Best Picture	Hacksaw Ridge	Nominated	
Critics' Choice Movie Awards	December 11, 2016	Best Director	Mel Gibson	Nominated	
Critics' Choice Movie Awards	December 11, 2016	Best Actor	Andrew Garfield	Nominated	
Critics' Choice Movie Awards	December 11, 2016	Best Editing	John Gilbert	Nominated	
Critics' Choice Movie Awards	December 11, 2016	Best Hair and Makeup	Hacksaw Ridge	Nominated	
Critics' Choice Movie Awards	December 11, 2016	Best Action Movie	Hacksaw Ridge	Won	
Critics' Choice Movie Awards	December 11, 2016	Best Actor in an Action Movie	Andrew Garfield	Won	
Dallas–Fort Worth Film Critics Association Awards	December 13, 2016	Top 10 Films	Hacksaw Ridge	9th Place	
Detroit Film Critics Society Awards	December 19, 2016	Best Actor	Andrew Garfield	Nominated	
Georgia Film Critics Association Awards	January 13, 2017	Best Picture	Hacksaw Ridge	Nominated	
Georgia Film Critics Association Awards	January 13, 2017	Best Actor	Andrew Garfield	Nominated	
Golden Globe Awards	January 8, 2017	Best Motion Picture – Drama	Hacksaw Ridge	Nominated	
Golden Globe Awards	January 8, 2017	Best Actor in a Motion Picture – Drama	Andrew Garfield	Nominated	
Golden Globe Awards	January 8, 2017	Best Director	Mel Gibson	Nominated	
Golden Raspberry Awards	February 25, 2017	Razzie Redeemer Award	Mel Gibson	Won	
Golden Reel Awards	February 19, 2017	Best Sound Editing in Feature Film – Dialogue/ADR	Justine Angus, Jed Dodge, Kimberly Harris, Michele Perrone and Andy Wright	Won	
Golden Reel Awards	February 19, 2017	Best Sound Editing – Sound Effects and Foley in an English Language Feature	Andy Wright, Steve Burgess, Alex Francis, Robert Mackenzie, Liam Price, Mario Vaccaro and Tara Webb	Won	
Golden Reel Awards	February 19, 2017	Best Sound Editing – Music in a Feature Film	Matt Friedman and Andy Patterson	Nominated	
Hollywood Film Awards	November 6, 2016	Director Award	Mel Gibson	Won	
Hollywood Film Awards	November 6, 2016	Editor Award	John Gilbert	Won	
Hollywood Film Awards	November 6, 2016	Make Up & Hair Styling Award	Angela Conte, Bec Taylor, Shane Thomas, and Noriko Watanabe	Won	
Hollywood Music in Media Awards	November 17, 2016	Best Original Score – Feature Film	Rupert Gregson-Williams	Nominated	
Houston Film Critics Society Awards	January 6, 2017	Best Actor	Andrew Garfield	Nominated	
Humanitas Prize	February 22, 2017	Feature Film	Andrew Knight and Robert Schenkkan	Won (Note: Tied with Allison Schroeder and Theodore Melfi for Hidden Figures)	
Irish Film & Television Awards	April 8, 2017	International Actor	Andrew Garfield	Nominated	
Irish Film & Television Awards	April 8, 2017	International Film	Hacksaw Ridge	Nominated	
Location Managers Guild Awards	April 8, 2017	Outstanding Locations in Period Film	Edward Donovan	Nominated	
London Film Critics' Circle Awards	January 22, 2017	Actor of the Year	Andrew Garfield	Nominated	
London Film Critics' Circle Awards	January 22, 2017	British/Irish Actor of the Year	Andrew Garfield	Won (Note: Also for Silence)	
National Board of Review Awards	November 29, 2016	Top 10 Films	Hacksaw Ridge	Won	
Palm Springs International Film Festival Awards	January 2, 2017	Spotlight Award	Andrew Garfield	Won	
Producers Guild of America Awards	January 28, 2017	Best Theatrical Motion Picture	Bill Mechanic and David Permut	Nominated	
Santa Barbara International Film Festival Awards	February 6, 2017	Variety Artisans Award – Sound Mixing	Kevin O'Connell	Won	
Satellite Awards	February 19, 2017	Best Motion Picture	Hacksaw Ridge	Nominated	
Satellite Awards	February 19, 2017	Best Director	Mel Gibson	Nominated	
Satellite Awards	February 19, 2017	Best Actor in a Motion Picture	Andrew Garfield	Won (Note: Tied with Viggo Mortensen for Captain Fantastic)	
Satellite Awards	February 19, 2017	Best Adapted Screenplay	Andrew Knight and Robert Schenkkan	Nominated	
Satellite Awards	February 19, 2017	Best Cinematography	Simon Duggan	Nominated	
Satellite Awards	February 19, 2017	Best Original Score	Rupert Gregson-Williams	Nominated	
Satellite Awards	February 19, 2017	Best Art Direction and Production Design	Barry Robinson	Nominated	
Satellite Awards	February 19, 2017	Best Film Editing	John Gilbert	Won	
Satellite Awards	February 19, 2017	Best Sound	Hacksaw Ridge	Won	
Saturn Awards	June 28, 2017	Best Action or Adventure Film	Hacksaw Ridge	Nominated	
Screen Actors Guild Awards	January 29, 2017	Outstanding Performance by a Male Actor in a Leading Role	Andrew Garfield	Nominated	
Screen Actors Guild Awards	January 29, 2017	Outstanding Performance by a Stunt Ensemble in a Motion Picture	Hacksaw Ridge	Won	
SOC Awards	February 11, 2017	Camera Operator of the Year – Film	Mark Goellnicht	Nominated	
St. Louis Film Critics Association Awards	December 18, 2016	Best Editing	John Gilbert	Runner-up (Note: Tied with Tom Cross for La La Land)	
St. Louis Film Critics Association Awards	December 18, 2016	Best Action Film	Hacksaw Ridge	Nominated	
Taurus World Stunt Awards	May 20, 2017	Best Fight	Damien Bryson, Markylee Campbell, Toby Fuller, Shinji Ikefuji and Tomoki Miyamoto	Won	
Taurus World Stunt Awards	May 20, 2017	Best Speciality Stunt	Yasushi Asaya	Won	
Taurus World Stunt Awards	May 20, 2017	Best Stunt Coordinator And/Or 2nd Unit Director	Kyle Gardiner and Mic Rodgers	Won	
Teen Choice Awards	August 13, 2017	Choice Movie Actor: Drama	Andrew Garfield	Nominated	
Washington D.C. Area Film Critics Association Awards	December 5, 2016	Best Actor	Andrew Garfield	Nominated	
