= AACTA Award for Best Sound =

Australian film award

The Australian Film Institute Award for Best Achievement in Sound is an award awarded yearly by the Australian Film Institute for excellence in sound editing, The award was first distributed in 1977 with the first winner being William Anderson for the film Don's Party.

== Winners and nominees ==
Year	Film	Nominees
1970s
1977	Don's Party	William Anderson
1977	Oz	Les Luxford
1977	Raw Deal	Bruce Lamshed
1977	Storm Boy	Bob Cogger
1978	The Last Wave	Don Connolly, Greg Bell and Phil Judd
1978	The Chant of Jimmie Blacksmith	Bob Allen, William Anderson, Peter Burgess, Dean Gawen and Gerry Humphreys
1978	The Getting of Wisdom	Desmond Bone, Gary Wilkins, William Anderson and Peter Fenton
1978	Newsfront	Tim Lloyd, Greg Bell and Peter Fenton
1979	Mad Max	Gary Wilkins, Byron Kennedy, Roger Savage and Ned Dawson
1980s
1980	Breaker Morant	Gary Wilkins, William Anderson, Jeanine Chiavlo and Phil Judd
1980	The Chain Reaction	Lloyd Carrick, Tim Wellburn and Phil Judd
1980	Harlequin	Gary Wilkins, Adrian Carr and Peter Fenton
1980	Stir	Gary Wilkins, Andrew Steuart and Phil Judd
1981	Gallipoli	Don Connolly, Greg Bell and Peter Fenton
1981	Hoodwink	Gary Wilkins, Andrew Steuart and Peter Fenton
1981	The Survivor	Tim Lloyd, Bruce Longhead and Peter Fenton
1981	Winter of Our Dreams	Lloyd Carrick, Andrew Steuart, Phil Judd and Phil Hayward
1982	Mad Max 2	Roger Savage, Bruce Lamshed, Byron Kennedy, Lloyd Carrick, Marc van Buuren, Penn Robinson and Andrew Steuart
1982	Heatwave	Julian Ellingworth, Grant Stuart, Lloyd Carrick, Greg Bell and Peter Fenton
1982	The Man from Snowy River	Terry Rodman, Gary Wilkins and Robert J. Litt
1982	Moving Out	G. White and Martin Jeffs
1983	Phar Lap	Peter Burgess, Peter Fenton, Phil Heywood, Ron Purvis, Terry Rodman and Gary Wilkins
1983	Buddies	Peter Barker, Julian Ellingworth and Marc van Buuren
1983	Careful, He Might Hear You	Syd Butterfield, Julian Ellingworth, Roger Savage and Andrew Steuart
1983	The Year of Living Dangerously	Jeanine Chiavlo, Peter Fenton, Lee Smith and Andrew Steuart
1984	Street Hero	Gary Wilkins, Mark J. Wasiutak, Roger Savage, Bruce Lamshed, Terry Rodman and David Harrison
1984	BMX Bandits	Andrew Steuart, John Patterson, Robin Judge, Phil Judd and Gethin Creagh
1984	Razorback	Tim Lloyd, Ron Purvis, Peter Fenton, Phil Heywood, Greg Bell, Helen Brown and Ashley Grenville
1984	Strikebound	Dean Gawen, Gethin Creagh, Frank Lipson, Martin Oswin and Rex Watts
1985	Rebel	Mark Lewis, Penn Robinson, Julian Ellingworth and Jim Taig
1985	Bliss	Dean Gawen, Peter Fenton, Phil Heywood, Gary Wilkins, Helen Brown and Ron Purvis
1985	The Coca-Cola Kid	Mark Lewis, Gethin Creagh, Martin Oswin, Dean Gawen and Helen Brown
1985	Frog Dreaming	Mark Lewis, Craig Carter, Ken Sallows, Tim Chau, Rex Watts and Roger Savage
1986	Malcolm	Roger Savage, Craig Carter, Dean Gawen and Paul Clark
1986	Burke & Wills	Syd Butterworth, Phil Heywood, Ron Punis, Lee Smith, Peter Fenton and Jeanine Chiavlo
1986	Playing Beatie Bow	Robert 'Gotch' Cutcher, Frank Lipson, Glenn Newnham, James Currie, Peter D. Smith and David Harrison
1986	Young Einstein	Roger Savage, Bruce Lamshed, Steve Burgess, Geoff Grist, Anne Breslin and Peter Fenton
1987	Ground Zero	Gary Wilkins, Mark J. Wasiutak, Livia Ruzic, Craig Carter and Roger Savage
1987	Belinda	Tim Lloyd, Martin Oswin, John Herron, David Hugged, Glenn Auchinachie and Dimity Gregson
1987	Echoes of Paradise	Tim Lloyd, Greg Bell, Peter Fenton, Phil Heywood, Martin Oswin
1987	High Tide	Peter Fenton, Phil Heywood, Ben Osmo, Geoff Krix, John Jordan, Anne Breslin, John Patterson and Martin Oswin
1988	The Lighthorsemen	Lloyd Carrick, Craig Carter, Peter Burgess, James Currie, Phil Heywood and Peter D. Wood
1988	Dangerous Game	Peter Fenton, Phil Heywood and Martin Oswin
1988	The Man from Snowy River II	Terry Rodman, David Harrison, Ron Purvis, Tim Chau, Peter Burgess and Gary Wilkins
1988	Rikky and Pete	Roger Savage, Lloyd Carrick, Frank Lipson, Craig Carter, Chris Goldsmith and Ross Chambers
1989	Dead Calm	Ben Osmo, Lee Smith and Roger Savage
1989	Evil Angels	Craig Carter, Terry Rodman, Peter Fenton and Martin Oswin
1989	Georgia	John Phillips, Roger Savage, Frank Lipson and Ross Porter
1989	Ghosts... of the Civil Dead	Bronwyn Murphy, Rex Watts and Peter Clancy
1990s
1990	Blood Oath	Ben Osmo, Gethin Creagh and Roger Savage
1990	The Big Steal	John Wilkinson and Dean Gawen
1990	Flirting	Antony Gray, Ross Linton and Phil Judd
1990	Golden Braid	James Currie
1991	Dingo	Henri Morelle, Ashley Grenville and James Currie
1991	Isabelle Eberhardt	Bernard Aubouy, Dean Gawen and Roger Savage
1991	Proof	Lloyd Carrick, Glenn Newnham and Roger Savage
1991	Till There Was You	Gary Wilkins, Tim Jordan and Phil Judd
1992	Romper Stomper	Steve Burgess, David Lee and Frank Lipson
1992	Black Robe	Phil Judd, Penn Robinson and Gary Wilkins
1992	Love in Limbo	Phil Judd, Guntis Sics and Karin Whittington
1992	Strictly Ballroom	Bruce Brown, Ben Osmo and Roger Savage
1993	The Piano	Lee Smith, Tony Johnson, Gethin Creagh, Peter Townend and Annabelle Sheehan
1993	Broken Highway	Penn Robinson, Jeanine Chiavlo and Paul 'Salty' Brincat
1993	Map of the Human Heart	Andrew Plain and Gethin Creagh
1993	Shotgun Wedding	John Dennison, Tony Vaccher, John Patterson, Ross Linton and Nicholas Holmes
1994	Muriel's Wedding	David Lee, Glenn Newnham, Livia Ruzic and Roger Savage
1994	Body Melt	Philip Brophy and Craig Carter
1994	Sirens	Dean Humphreys, David Lee and Susan Midgley
1994	The Sum of Us	John Dennison, John Patterson, Leo Sullivan and Tony Vaccher
1995	Metal Skin	Frank Lipson, David Lee, Steve Burgess, Peter Burgess and Glenn Newnham
1995	Hotel Sorrento	Roger Savage, Gareth Vanderhope, Glenn Newnham and James Harvey
1995	Mushrooms	John Dennison, Tony Vaccher, John Patterson and David Lee
1995	Vacant Possession	Tony Vaccher, John Dennison, Bronwyn Murphy and John Patterson
1996	Shine	Toivo Lember, Roger Savage, Livia Ruzic and Gareth Vanderhope
1996	Children of the Revolution	Guntis Sics, Andrew Plain and Gethin Creagh
1996	Dead Heart	Ian McLoughlin, Tim Jordan, John Penders and Phil Tipene
1996	To Have & to Hold	Dean Gawen, Rex Watts, Paul Huntingford and Stephen Vaughan
1997	Kiss or Kill	Wayne Pashley, Toivo Lember and Gethin Creagh
1997	Doing Time for Patsy Cline	John Dennison, Tony Vaccher, John Patterson, Craig Butters and Chris Alderton
1997	Idiot Box	Liam Egan, Phil Judd, Alicia Slusarski and David White
1997	The Well	Anne Breslin, Gethin Creagh and Bronwyn Murphy
1998	Oscar and Lucinda	Andrew Plain, Ben Osmo and Gethin Creagh
1998	The Boys	Sam Petty, Peter Grace and Phil Judd
1998	Head On	Lloyd Carrick, Roger Savage, Craig Carter and Livia Ruzic
1998	The Interview	Peter Palankay, Steve Witherow, John Wilkinson and Peter D. Smith
1999	In a Savage Land	Toivo Lember, Gethin Creagh, Peter D. Smith and Wayne Pashley
1999	Passion	Andrew Plain, Phil Judd, Guntis Sics, Anne Breslin and Jane Paterson
1999	Praise	Simon Leadley, Brent Burge, Andrew Plain, Antony Gray, Gethin Creagh and Phil Tipene
1999	Two Hands	Lee Smith, Ross Linton, Philip Heywood, Peter Townend, Tim Jordan and Nick Breslin
2000s
2000	Bootmen	David Lee, Laurence Maddy, Andrew Plain and Ian McLoughlin
2000	Chopper	Frank Lipson, Glenn Newnham, Steve Burgess and John Schiefelbein
2000	The Magic Pudding	Phil Judd, Dave Eggins, Julius Chan, Liam Egan and Les Fiddess
2000	A Wreck A Tangle	Phil Judd, Bronwyn Murphy, Liam Egan and Julius Chan
2001	Moulin Rouge!	Andy Nelson, Roger Savage and Guntis Sics
2001	The Bank	Phil Heywood, Sam Petty and Andrew Ramage
2001	Lantana	Syd Butterworth, Andrew Plain and Robert Sullivan
2001	La Spagnola	Peter Grace, Phil Judd and Andrew Plain
2002	Rabbit-Proof Fence	Bronwyn Murphy, Craig Carter, Ricky Edwards and John Penders
2002	Australian Rules	Phil Judd, Julius Chan, Liam Egan and Jenny T. Ward
2002	Garage Days	Peter Grace, Tony Vaccher, Phil Winters and Simon Leadley
2002	Walking on Water	Liam Egan, Robert Sullivan, Delia McCarthy and Jenny T. Ward
2003	Japanese Story	Livia Ruzic, Peter Grace and Peter D. Smith
2003	Alexandra's Project	James Currie, Andrew Plain, Nada Mikas and Rory McGregor
2003	Gettin' Square	John Schiefelbein, Antony Gray and Ian McLoughlin
2003	Ned Kelly	Gary Wilkins, Colin Miller and Adrian Rhodes
2004	Somersault	Mark Blackwell, Peter D. Smith and Sam Petty
2004	One Perfect Day	Glenn Newnham, Jack McKerrow and Paul Pirola
2004	Thunderstruck	Peter D. Smith, Peter Townend and Wayne Pashley
2004	Tom White	James Currie, Mike Bakaloff, Peter Walker and Tristan Meredith
2005	Little Fish	Sam Petty, Peter Grace, Robert Sullivan and Yulia Akerholt
2005	Look Both Ways	Andrew Plain, Peter D. Smith and Toivo Lember
2005	The Proposition	Craig Walmsley, Paul Davies, Richard Davey and Ian Morgan
2005	Wolf Creek	Des Kenneally, Peter D. Smith, Pete Best and Tom Heuzenroeder
2006	Ten Canoes	James Currie, Tom Heuzenroeder, Mike Bakaloff and Rory McGregor
2006	Jindabyne	Andrew Plain, Peter Grace, Nada Mikas, Peter Miller, Linda Murdoch and Robert Sullivan
2006	Macbeth	Frank Lipson and John Wilkinson
2006	Suburban Mayhem	Liam Egan, Phil Judd and Stephen Vaughan
2007	Noise	Emma Bortignon, Doron Kipen and Philippe Decrausaz
2007	Clubland	Andrew Neil, Ian McLoughlin, Liam Egan and Stephen Vaughan
2007	The Home Song Stories	Craig Carter, James Harvey, Andrew Neil and John Wilkinson
2007	Romulus, My Father	Sam Petty, Gary Wilkins and Phil Heywood
2008	Unfinished Sky	Andrew Plain, Anne Breslin and William Ward
2008	The Black Balloon	Ben Osmo and Paul Pirola
2008	Hey, Hey, It's Esther Blueburger	Liam Egan, Tony Murtagh, Phil Judd and Des Kenneally
2008	The Tender Hook	Liam Egan, Tony Murtagh, Phil Judd and Gary Wilkins
2009	Samson and Delilah	Liam Egan, David Tranter, Tony Murtagh, Robert Sullivan, Yulia Akerholt, and Les Fiddess
2009	Australia	Wayne Pashley and Guntis Sics
2009	Balibo	Sam Petty, Emma Bortignon, Phil Heywood and Ann Aucote
2009	Mao's Last Dancer	David Lee, Andrew Neil, Yulia Akerholt, Mark Franken and Roger Savage
2010s
2010	Tomorrow, When the War Began	Andrew Plain, David Lee, Gethin Creagh and Robert Sullivan
2010	Animal Kingdom	Sam Petty, Robert Mackenzie, Philippe Decrausaz, Leah Katz, Brooke Trezise and Richard Pain
2010	Beneath Hill 60	Liam Egan, Alicia Slusarski, Mark Cornish, Tony Murtagh, Robert Sullivan and Mario Vaccaro
2010	Bran Nue Dae	Andrew Neil, Steve Burgess, Peter Mills, Mario Vaccaro, Blair Slater, David Bridie and Scott Montgomery
AACTA Awards
2011 (1st)	Snowtown	Frank Lipson, Andrew McGrath, Des Kenneally, Michael Carden, John Simpson and Erin McKimm
2011 (1st)	The Hunter	Sam Petty, David Lee, Robert Mackenzie, Les Fiddess, Tony Murtagh and Tom Heuzenroeder
2011 (1st)	Legend of the Guardians: The Owls of Ga'Hoole	Wayne Pashley, Derryn Pasquill, Polly McKinnon, Fabian Sanjurjo, Phil Heywood and Peter D. Smith
2011 (1st)	Mad Bastards	Phil Judd, Nick Emond, Johanna Emond, Les Fiddess, Jennifer Sochackyj and Beth Tredray
2012 (2nd)	The Sapphires	Andrew Plain, Bry Jones, Peter D. Smith, Ben Osmo and John Simpson
2012 (2nd)	Burning Man	David Lee, Andrew Plain and Gethin Creagh
2012 (2nd)	Lore	Sam Petty, Michael Busch, Robert Mackenzie, Antony Gray, Yulia Akerholt and Brooke Trezise
2012 (2nd)	Swerve	Peter D. Smith, John Simpson, Martyn Zub and Des Kenneally
2013 (3rd)	The Great Gatsby	Wayne Pashley, Jenny T. Ward, Fabian Sanjurjo, Steve Maslow, Phil Heywood and Guntis Sics
2013 (3rd)	Mystery Road	Lawrence Horne, Nick Emond, Zheng 'Joe' Huang, Phil Judd, Les Fiddess and Greg P. Fitzgerald
2013 (3rd)	The Rocket	Sam Petty, Brooke Trezise, Nick Emond, Sam Hayward and Yulia Akerholt
2013 (3rd)	Satellite Boy	Phil Judd, Liam Egan, Nick Emond, Glenn Butler, Les Fiddess and Jennifer Sochackyj
2014 (4th)	The Rover	Sam Petty, Des Kenneally, Justine Angus, Brooke Trezise, Francis Ward Lindsay and Robert Mackenzie
2014 (4th)	Charlie's Country	James Currie and Tom Heuzenroeder
2014 (4th)	Felony	William Ward, Andrew Plain, Grant Shepherd and Robert Mackenzie
2014 (4th)	The Railway Man	Andrew Plain, Gethin Creagh, Craig Walmsley and Colin Nicolson
2015 (5th)	Mad Max: Fury Road	Ben Osmo, David White, Chris Jenkins, Gregg Rudloff, Wayne Pashley and Mark A. Mangini
2015 (5th)	The Dressmaker	Andrew Ramage, Glenn Newnham, Chris Goodes, David Williams, Mario Vaccaro and Alex Francis
2015 (5th)	Paper Planes	Chris Goodes, James Ashton, Emma Bortignon and Trevor Hope
2015 (5th)	Partisan	Robert Mackenzie and Dane Cody
2016 (6th)	Hacksaw Ridge	Andrew Wright, Robert Mackenzie, Kevin O'Connell, Mario Vaccaro, Tara Webb and Peter Grace
2016 (6th)	The Daughter	Liam Egan, Nick Emond, Tony Murtagh, James Andrews, Yulia Akerholt and Robert Sullivan
2016 (6th)	Gods of Egypt	Wayne Pashley, Peter Grace, Derryn Pasquill, Fabian Sanjurjo, Greg P. Fitzgerald and Peter Purcell
2016 (6th)	Tanna	Emma Bortignon, James Ashton and Martin Butler
2017 (7th)	Lion	James Ashton, Nakul Kamte, Robert Mackenzie, Glenn Newnham, Andrew Ramage and Mario Vaccaro
2017 (7th)	Jasper Jones	Yulia Akerholt, James Andrews, Liam Egan, Les Fiddess, Trevor Hope and Robert Sullivan
2017 (7th)	Killing Ground	Francis Byrne, Cate Cahill and Serge Lacroix
2017 (7th)	The Lego Batman Movie	Gregg Landaker, Rick Lisle, Wayne Pashley, Fabian Sanjurgo and Michael Semanick
2018 (8th)	Breath	Jed Dodge, Trevor Hope, Robert Mackenzie and Tara Webb
2018 (8th)	Cargo	Liam Egan, Leah Katz, Des Kenneally and Robert Sullivan
2018 (8th)	Sweet Country	Sam Gain-Emery, Thom Kellar, Will Sheridan and David Tranter
2018 (8th)	Upgrade	Will Files, P.K. Hooker and Andrew Ramage
2019 (9th)	Danger Close: The Battle of Long Tan	Liam Egan, Craig Walmsley, Alicia Slusarski, Robert Sullivan, Tony Murtagh and Les Fiddess
2019 (9th)	Hotel Mumbai	Sam Petty, Pete Smith, Nakul Kamte, James Currie and Peter Ristic
2019 (9th)	The King	Robert Mackenzie, Sam Petty, Gareth John, Leah Katz, Mario Vacarro and Tara Webb
2019 (9th)	The Nightingale	Robert Mackenzie, Dean Ryan, Leah Katz and Pete Smith
2020s
2020 (10th)	The Invisible Man	P.K Hooker, Will Files and Paul "Salty" Brincat
2020 (10th)	Babyteeth	Sam Hayward, Angus Robertson, Rick Lisle and Nick Emond
2020 (10th)	I Am Woman	Robert Mackenzie, Ben Osmo, Pete Smith and Tara Webb
2020 (10th)	Relic	Robert Mackenzie, John Wilkinson, Steve Burgess and Glenn Newnham
2020 (10th)	True History of the Kelly Gang	Frank Lipson, Steve Single, Andrew Neil and Andrew Ramage
2021 (11th)	Mortal Kombat	Robert Mackenzie, Steve Burgess and Phil Heywood
2021 (11th)	Ascendant	Angus Robertson and Peter Purcell
2021 (11th)	The Dry	Chris Goodes
2021 (11th)	Nitram	Steve Single, Dean Ryan and James Ashton
2021 (11th)	Peter Rabbit 2: The Runaway	Kevin O'Connell, Robert Mackenzie, Andy Wright and Ben Osmo
2022 (12th)	Elvis	David Lee, Wayne Pashley, Andy Nelson and Michael Keller
2022 (12th)	Bosch & Rockit	Angus Robertson, Sam Hayward, Scott Mulready, Leah Katz, Cameron Grant and Les Fiddess
2022 (12th)	The Drover's Wife: The Legend of Molly Johnson	Liam Egan, Nick Emond, Leah Katz, Robert Sullivan, Tom Heuzenroeder and Les Fiddess
2022 (12th)	The Stranger	Andy Wright, Will Sheridan, Beth Bezzina and Chris Goodes
2022 (12th)	Three Thousand Years of Longing	Robert Mackenzie, Ben Osmo, Yulia Akerholt and James Ashton
2023 (13th)	Talk to Me	Emma Bortignon, Pete Smith and Nick Steele
2023 (13th)	Godless: The Eastfield Exorcism	Benni Knop
2023 (13th)	Scarygirl	Stuart Morton, Cameron Grant and Diego Ruiz
2023 (13th)	Seriously Red	Angus Robertson, Sam Hayward, Guntis Sics and Danielle Wiessner
2023 (13th)	Three Chords and the Truth	Anthony Marsh
2024 (14th)	Furiosa: A Mad Max Saga	Robert Mackenzie, Ben Osmo, James Ashton, Yulia Akerholt, Jessica Meier and Tom Holkenborg
2024 (14th)	Better Man	Paul Pirola, Guntis Sics, Greg P. Russell, Tom Marks and Andy Nelson
2024 (14th)	How to Make Gravy	Craig Walmsley, Stuart Morton, Diego Ruiz and Sam Hayward
2024 (14th)	Late Night with the Devil	Emma Bortignon, Manel Lopez, Pete Smith and Cameron Grant
2024 (14th)	Memoir of a Snail	David Williams, Andy Wright, Lee Yee and Dylan Burgess
