= Furiosa: A Mad Max Saga =

2024 film by George Miller

- Theatrical release poster
- Directed by: George Miller
- Written by: George Miller; Nico Lathouris
- Based on: Characters by: George Miller; Byron Kennedy; Nico Lathouris
- Produced by: Doug Mitchell; George Miller
- Starring: Anya Taylor-Joy; Chris Hemsworth; Tom Burke; Alyla Browne
- Cinematography: Simon Duggan
- Edited by: Eliot Knapman; Margaret Sixel
- Music by: Tom Holkenborg
- Production company: Kennedy Miller Mitchell
- Distributed by: Warner Bros. Pictures (Worldwide); Universal Pictures (Australia and New Zealand)
- Release dates: 15 May 2024 (Cannes); 23 May 2024 (Australia); 24 May 2024 (United States)
- Running time: 148 minutes
- Countries: Australia; United States
- Language: English
- Budget: $168 million
- Box office: $174.4 million

Furiosa: A Mad Max Saga is a 2024 epic post-apocalyptic action film directed and produced by George Miller, who wrote the screenplay with Nico Lathouris. It is the fifth installment in the Mad Max franchise, and the first not focused on Max Rockatansky, instead a spinoff prequel to Mad Max: Fury Road (2015) and an origin story for Furiosa. Starring Anya Taylor-Joy and Alyla Browne as said character and set years before Fury Road, the film follows her life for over a decade, from her kidnapping by the forces of warlord Dementus (Chris Hemsworth) to her ascension to the rank of Imperator. Tom Burke also stars as Praetorian Jack, a military commander who befriends Furiosa. Several Fury Road cast members return in supporting roles, including John Howard, Nathan Jones, and Angus Sampson reprising their characters. The film begins in what can be seen as a green paradise of a solarpunk future and quickly moves to the more traditional dieselpunk, which the Mad Max franchise is known for.

Miller initially intended to shoot Furiosa back-to-back with Fury Road, but the former spent several years in development hell amidst salary disputes with Warner Bros. Pictures, Fury Road's distributor. Several crew members from Fury Road returned for Furiosa, including Lathouris, producer Doug Mitchell, composer Tom Holkenborg, costume designer Jenny Beavan, and editor Margaret Sixel (Miller's wife). Filming took place in Australia from June to October 2022.

Furiosa: A Mad Max Saga premiered at the 77th Cannes Film Festival on 15 May 2024. It was released theatrically in Australia on 23 May 2024 and in the United States the following day. The film received highly positive reviews from critics and multiple award nominations. It was named one of the Top Ten Films of 2024 by the National Board of Review, but was a box-office bomb, grossing $174.4 million against its budget of $168 million.

== Plot ==
=== Chapter 1: The Pole of Inaccessibility ===
Decades after the apocalypse, Australia is a radioactive wasteland and the Green Place of Many Mothers is one of the last remaining areas with fresh water and plant cultivation. The Roobillies discover the Green Place while two children, Furiosa and Valkyrie, are picking peaches. Furiosa tries to sabotage their motorcycles, but the Roobillies capture her as a prize for Dementus, leader of the Biker Horde.

Furiosa's mother Mary Jabassa pursues the raiders to the Horde's camp to rescue Furiosa, but Dementus tracks them down. Mary stays behind to buy Furiosa time to escape and gives her a peach pit to remember her by, but Furiosa refuses to leave Mary behind. Dementus forces Furiosa to watch her mother's crucifixion and torture at the hands of Dementus lieutenant The Octoboss. Haunted by his own family's death, Dementus adopts Furiosa as his daughter. She tattoos a star chart to the Green Place on her left arm to find her way home.

=== Chapter 2: Lessons from the Wasteland ===
Sometime after, Dementus besieges the Citadel, another settlement with fresh water and plants. However, the Horde is repelled by the War Boys, the fanatical army of Citadel warlord Immortan Joe. Dementus uses a Trojan Horse strategy to capture Gastown, an oil refinery that supplies the Citadel with gasoline, from Joe's brother. At peace negotiations, during which Joe's brother is accidentally killed, Joe recognizes Dementus's authority over Gastown and increases its supplies of food and water in exchange for the Horde's Organic Mechanic and Furiosa. Afterwards, Joe imprisons Furiosa with his stable of "wives" inside a vault. After Joe's son Rictus shows an attraction towards her, Furiosa devises a plan to escape. One night, Rictus breaks Furiosa out of Joe's vault but she slips from his grasp using a wig made from her own hair and disappears. Disguised as a mute boy, Furiosa works her way up the ranks of Joe's men for over a decade.

=== Chapter 3: The Stowaway ===
Some years later, Furiosa helps build the War Rig, a heavily armed supply tanker that can withstand raider attacks in the lawless Wasteland. Furiosa plans to escape by hiding on the Rig when Joe sends his top driver, Praetorian Jack, on a supply run. Disillusioned by Dementus's callousness, The Octoboss goes rogue and launches an air assault on the Rig. His Mortifiers slaughter the Rig's entire crew and destroy Furiosa's hidden motorcycle, but Furiosa and Jack team up to defeat them. Furiosa tries to carjack the Rig and drive home, but Jack easily thwarts her. However, he recognizes her potential and offers to train her to escape if she helps him rebuild his crew.

=== Chapter 4: Homeward ===
Furiosa becomes Jack's second-in-command and is promoted to Praetorian. She and Jack develop a bond and resolve to escape together. They see an opportunity when Joe decides to attack Gastown, which Dementus has mismanaged to near-ruin. Joe orders Furiosa and Jack to collect weapons and ammunition from the Bullet Farm, an allied mining facility. However, Dementus, having already taken possession of the farm, ambushes them when they arrive. Furiosa and Jack barely escape, and Furiosa's left arm is injured. Dementus chases them down and has Jack dragged to death. Furiosa escapes her chains by severing her own injured arm, sacrificing her star map.

A lone man (Note: Identified in the credits as "Mad Max" Rockatansky; the cameo parallels the opening scene of Mad Max: Fury Road. In an interview, composer Tom Holkenborg said that he believed it was meant to represent the actual start of that film, although Miller has not confirmed this.) watches from afar as Furiosa struggles back to the Citadel, where she and Joe's aide The People Eater form a strategy to avoid a trap planned by Dementus. Instead, Dementus is lured into a trap at the Citadel, and the War Boys crush the Horde. Having lost her path home, Furiosa shaves her head and builds a mechanical prosthetic in place of her severed arm.

=== Chapter 5: Beyond Vengeance ===
Furiosa pursues the fleeing Dementus. After an extended chase, Furiosa subdues Dementus in the desert. She imprisons Dementus in the Citadel and uses his still-living body as fertilizer to grow a peach tree from her mother's pit. Joe promotes Furiosa to "Imperator" and gives her command of a new War Rig.

She meets Joe's five breeder wives in the vault where Joe once held her prisoner and shows them a peach from the tree. The night before another supply run, the "Five Wives" hide in Furiosa's Rig. (Note: As depicted in Mad Max: Fury Road (2015))

== Cast ==
The first three are credited in the opening credits:

- Anya Taylor-Joy as Furiosa, a woman who was taken from the Green Place as a kid and works her way up the ranks of the Citadel. Taylor-Joy wore two different wigs over her natural hair.
  - Alyla Browne as child and teenage Furiosa. Browne wore fake feet for scenes in the Wasteland and wore different wigs over her natural hair.
  - Archive footage of Charlize Theron as the older Furiosa from Mad Max: Fury Road is used during the final scene and end credits
- Chris Hemsworth as Dementus, the deranged warlord leader of the Biker Horde who abducted Furiosa, and eventual ruler of Gastown
  - Sean Renfrey as the Echo Man, a possible fate of Dementus where he was used as a fertilizer for Furiosa's peach tree
- Tom Burke as Praetorian Jack, the commander of the Citadel's first War Rig

The following names are listed during the end credits part containing the archive footage of Mad Max: Fury Road:

- George Shevtsov as The History Man, an expert in pre-apocalyptic history, science, and technology who serves Dementus. He serves as the film's narrator
- Lachy Hulme as:
  - Immortan Joe, the warlord leader of the Citadel and enemy of the Biker Horde
    - Archive footage of Hugh Keays-Byrne as Immortan Joe from Mad Max: Fury Road is used during the end credits
  - Rizzdale Pell, Dementus' lieutenant
- John Howard as The People Eater, Immortan Joe's advisor and military strategist and the future ruler of Gastown in Mad Max: Fury Road
- Angus Sampson as The Organic Mechanic, Dementus' personal physician that Immortan Joe claims in a deal with Dementus
- Charlee Fraser as Mary Jabassa, Furiosa's mother and a top member of the Vuvalini
- Elsa Pataky as:
  - The Vuvalini General, the second-in-command of Mary and member of the Vuvalini
  - Mr. Norton, a deformed survivor who joins the Biker Horde
- Nathan Jones as Rictus Erectus, Immortan Joe's muscular but dimwitted son
- Josh Helman as Scrotus, Immortan Joe's psychologically unstable son (Note: Previously voiced by Travis Willingham in the 2015 Mad Max video game) (Note: Helman previously portrayed Slit, Nux's lancer and one of the War Boys in Mad Max: Fury Road)
- David Field as Toe Jam, a member of the nomadic Roobillies biker gang that's loyal to Dementus who was responsible for capturing Furiosa
- Rahel Romahn as Vulture, a member of the nomadic Roobillies biker gang that is later killed by Mary who steals some of his clothes in order to get into Dementus' camp
- David Collins as Smeg, Dementus's henchman, dance proclaimer, and messenger of the Biker Horde
- Goran D. Kleut as The Octoboss, the leader of the Mortifiers biker gang who begins the film as Dementus's temporary ally
- CJ Bloomfield as Big Jilly, a member of Dementus' Biker Horde
- Matuse as Fang, Dementus's henchman
- Ian Roberts as Mr. Harley, a member of Dementus' Biker Horde
- Guy Spence as Mr. Davidson, a member of Dementus' Biker Horde
- Rob Jones as Squint, a member of Dementus' Biker Horde
- Clarence Ryan as Black Thumb, Praetorian Jack's mechanic on the War Rig
- Tim Burns as Hungry Eyes, a member of Dementus' Biker Horde
- Tim Rogers as Snapper, a member of Dementus' Biker Horde who is killed by Mary
- Florence Mezzara as Sad Eyes, a member of Dementus' biker horde who tended to Furiosa before Mary's arrival
- Quaden Bayles as War Pup, a young War Boy on board the War Rig during Jack's supply run
- Peter Stephens as the Guardian of Gastown, the warlord in charge of Gastown who is later captured by Dementus and accidentally killed by a spike through his head during Dementus' meeting with Immortan Joe
- Sean Millis as a Lone War Boy, a War Boy who later took part in the Forty Day Wasteland War against the Biker Horde
- Lee Perry as The Bullet Farmer, ruler of the Bullet Farm and the Citadel's arms supplier (Note: Perry took over the role from the late Richard Carter, who died in 2019)
  - Archive footage of Richard Carter as The Bullet Farmer from Mad Max: Fury Road is used during the end credits
- Daniel Webber as War Boy (uncredited)

The rest of the cast were listed under these categories:

The Green Place

- Dylan Adonis as Valkyrie, a member of the Vulvalini who is Furiosa's childhood friend
  - Archive footage of Megan Gale as an older Valkyrie from Mad Max: Fury Road is used during the end credits.
- Anna Adams and Peter Sammak as the Vuvalini

Roobillies

- Shea Adams as Cannibal, a full-masked member of the Roobillies who is the first to be killed by Mary
- Josh Randall as Savage, a goggled and mouth-masked member of the Roobillies who is the second to be killed by Mary and has his motorcycle confiscated by her
- Karl Van Moorsel as Hacker, a cap-wearing and mouth-masked member of the Roobillies who is the third to be killed by Mary

Citadel Siege

- Dawn Clingberg as Corpse Minder, an old lady and member of the Wretched who keeps corpses for her maggots
- Richard Norton as the Prime Imperator, a high-ranking lieutenant of the War Boys
- Stephen Amadasun as the Shotgun Praetorian, a high-ranking member of the War Boys
- Nick Annas as the First Pick War Boy, a War Boy who was thought to have been picked by Smeg
- Ripley Voeten as the Chosen War Boy, a War Boy who was picked by Smeg

Gastown and the Trojan Truck

- Matt Van Leeve as Mortiflyer Matt, a member of Dementus' biker horde and The Octoboss' Mortiflyers who was instructed to disguise himself as a War Boy
- Shane Dundas as a Gastown Gate Watchman
- Jamie Cluff and Adam Thompson as the Gastown Gate Openers
- Shyan Tonga as the Gastown Rioter, an unnamed worker in Gastown

A Deal Is Done

- Nellie Collins as a Winchman of the Citadel's main platform
- Adam Washbourne, James Corcoran, Sasha Vitanovic, Tige Sixel Miller as Watch Tower Praetorian Guards
- Justice Jones as Praetorian Pup, a War Boy who serves out food during Dementus' meeting with Immortan Joe

Immortan's Harem

- Maleeka Gasbarri as one of Immortan Joe's "wives" who gives birth to a baby with a conjoined body
- Keza Ishimwe and Nat Buchanan as two of Immortan Joe's "wives"

The House of Holy Motors

- Jacob Tomuri as The Dogman, a worker at the Citadel
- Mark Wales as Brake Man, a mechanic at the Citadel
- Bryan Probets as Chumbucket, a hunchbacked auto mechanic at the Citadel (Note: Previously voiced by Jason Spisak in the 2015 Mad Max video game)
- Danny Lim as High Master Black Thumb, a mechanic at the Citadel
- Darcy Brice as Pissboy, a War Boy maintenance worker
- Chudier Gatwech as a Wretched Man recruit who helps build the War Rig
- Spencer Connelly as Rakka the Brakkish, a War Boy who helps build the War Rig

Stowaway to Nowhere

- Ben Smith-Petersen as Ace War Boy, a War Boy on the War Rig who is killed by a grenade thrown by a Mortiflyer.
- Toby Fuller as Lookout War Boy, a War Boy who is the lookout on the War Rig and sacrifices himself to take on the Mortifiers' Mortiflyers
- Jayden Irving as Witness War Boy, a War Boy on the War Rig who sacrifices himself to take on the Mortifiers' Mortiflyers.
- Karl Van Moorsel as a Mortiflyer bomb setter who attacks the War Rig and is killed by Pissboy

Happy Bullet Farm

- Jon Iles as a Senior War Boy at the Bullet Farm who tells Pretorian Jack that Dementus is running Gastown into the ground

The Escape Plan

- Harrison Norris as Hazz the Valiant, a War Boy who becomes the new driver of the War Rig and is killed by the Biker Horde
- Ash Hodgkinson as Valiant Lancer, a War Boy on the War Rig who was killed by the biker horde.
- Jacob Tomuri as Max Rockatansky, (Note: Credited as "Mad Max") a loner living in his V8 Interceptor who witnesses Furiosa escape from the biker horde. He later helps Furiosa and the "Five Wives" defeat Immortan Joe and his army, and claim control of the Citadel in Mad Max: Fury Road. Tomuri served as Tom Hardy's stunt double during the filming of Fury Road.
  - Archive footage of Hardy as Max from Mad Max: Fury Road is used during the end credits

Additionally, the end credits are intercut with archive footage from Mad Max: Fury Road, in which Nicholas Hoult, Rosie Huntington-Whiteley, Zoë Kravitz, Riley Keough, Abbey Lee, and Courtney Eaton appear as Nux, The Splendid Angharad, Toast the Knowing, Capable, The Dag, and Cheedo the Fragile, respectively; the latter five are also portrayed by stand-ins in silhouette during the film's final scene.

== Production ==
=== Pre-production ===
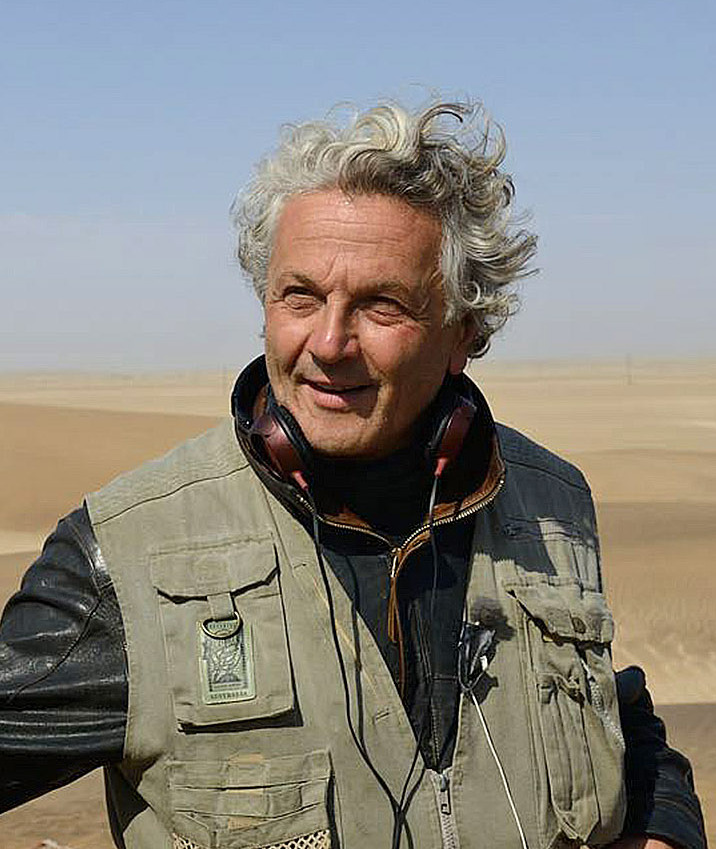
Director George Miller while filming Mad Max: Fury Road in 2012

Director George Miller and co-writer Nico Lathouris spent over fifteen years writing the script for Mad Max: Fury Road (2015), and developed backstories for every character, particularly co-protagonist Imperator Furiosa. Miller and Lathouris eventually wrote a Furiosa-centered screenplay, which actress Charlize Theron used as a reference for her performance in Fury Road. According to Miller, Furiosa "probably" takes place after Mad Max Beyond Thunderdome (1985), but the Mad Max franchise has "no strict chronology". The first trailer of the film, released on 30 November 2023, stated that Furiosa takes place "45 years after the collapse".

In July 2010, Miller announced plans to shoot Fury Road back-to-back with a live-action prequel film entitled Mad Max: Furiosa, but, during pre-production, it was decided to shoot only Fury Road. At one point, Miller and Lathouris hoped to turn the Furiosa screenplay into an anime film directed by Mahiro Maeda, who had previously worked on The Animatrix (2003), Neon Genesis Evangelion (1995–96), and Porco Rosso (1992).

In May 2015, Miller stated that if Fury Road became successful, he would develop two more films. In November 2017, Miller's production company filed a lawsuit against Warner Bros. over a Fury Road salary dispute, which delayed the production of any additional entries in the franchise. In July 2019, Miller revealed that a Furiosa film was still being planned in addition to two Mad Max sequels.

By March 2020, Miller and Warner Bros. settled their lawsuit and began casting the Furiosa prequel, which Miller intended to make after Three Thousand Years of Longing (2022). It was reported that the film would take place over a timeframe of fifteen years, depicting Furiosa's backstory of how she was displaced from her home and spent her life "trying to get back".

Multiple Fury Road crew members agreed to return for the film, including composer Tom Holkenborg, costume designer Jenny Beavan, editor Margaret Sixel, makeup designer Lesley Vanderwalt, production designer Colin Gibson (no relation to original Mad Max star Mel Gibson), and sound mixer Ben Osmo; Beavan, Sixel, Vanderwalt, Gibson, and Osmo had all previously won Academy Awards for their work on Fury Road. In 2020, Miller said that the semi-retired John Seale had agreed to return as cinematographer, but Seale retired after shooting Miller's Three Thousand Years of Longing, explaining that he wanted to spend more time with his grandchildren. Simon Duggan took over as Furiosa's cinematographer. "George was definitely looking to find an Australian cinematographer", Duggan recalled. "P.J. [Voeten] told him, 'Look, it's a no-brainer — just get Simon to come in and do it', and George trusted him. George knew the work I was doing and thought it was amazing, so when we first met, we just wanted to talk about the Australian industry, the people we knew and the experiences we had. And we knew that Fury Road was the starting point to the look and feel of what Furiosa was going to be — but only a starting point."

Village Roadshow Pictures, which had co-financed Fury Road, was credited in initial marketing material for Furiosa, with its involvement also acknowledged by an official press kit related to the film and a press release by the Cannes Film Festival. However, following its premiere, all mentions of the company were omitted from promotions and the film itself. In May 2024, a box office report by Deadline Hollywood stated that Warner Bros. "is all in on Furiosa" and financed the bulk of the film's budget without co-financiers, such as Village Roadshow, most likely the result of a content dispute related to Warner Bros.' simultaneous release strategy followed in 2021.

=== Casting ===
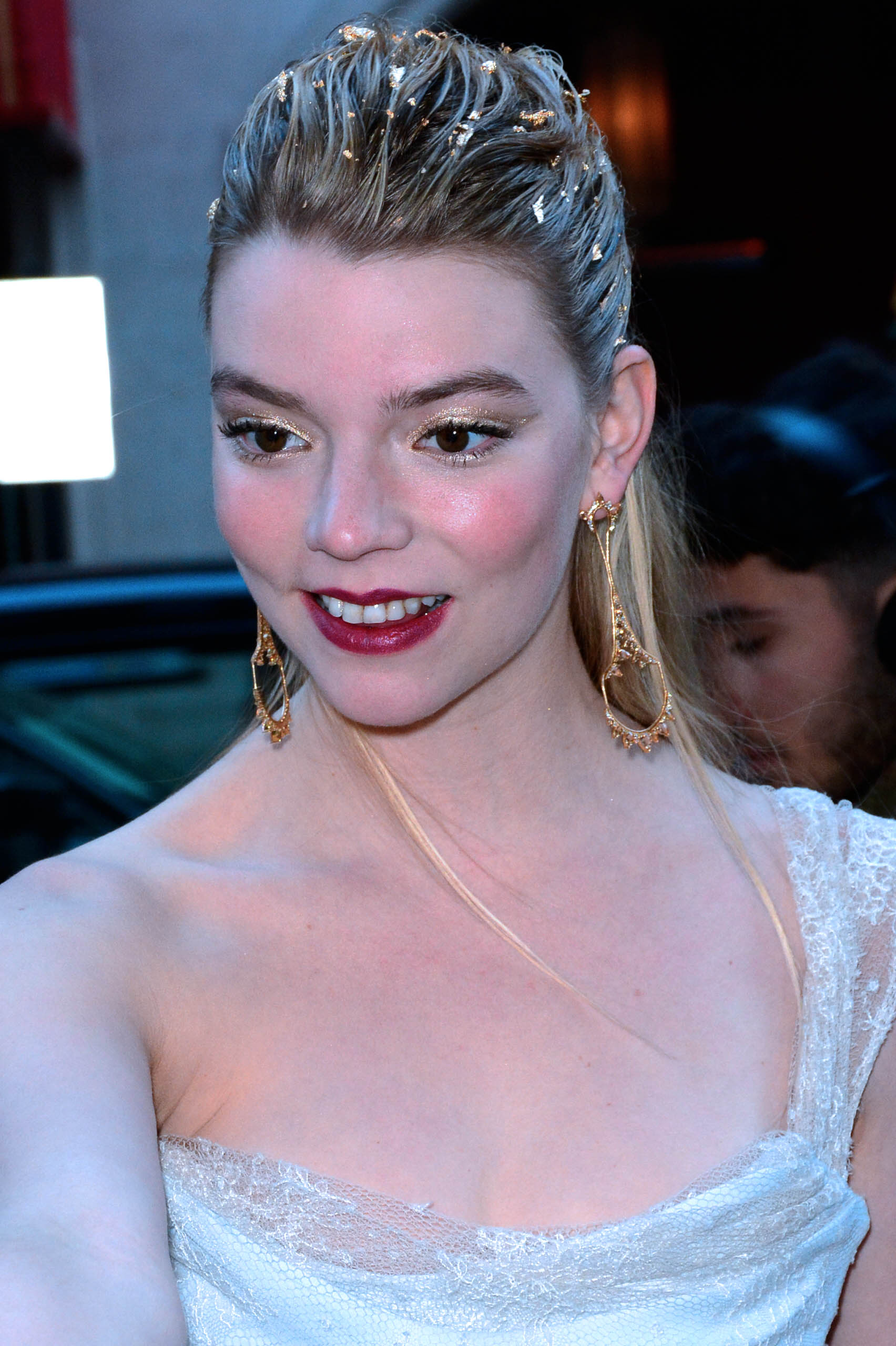
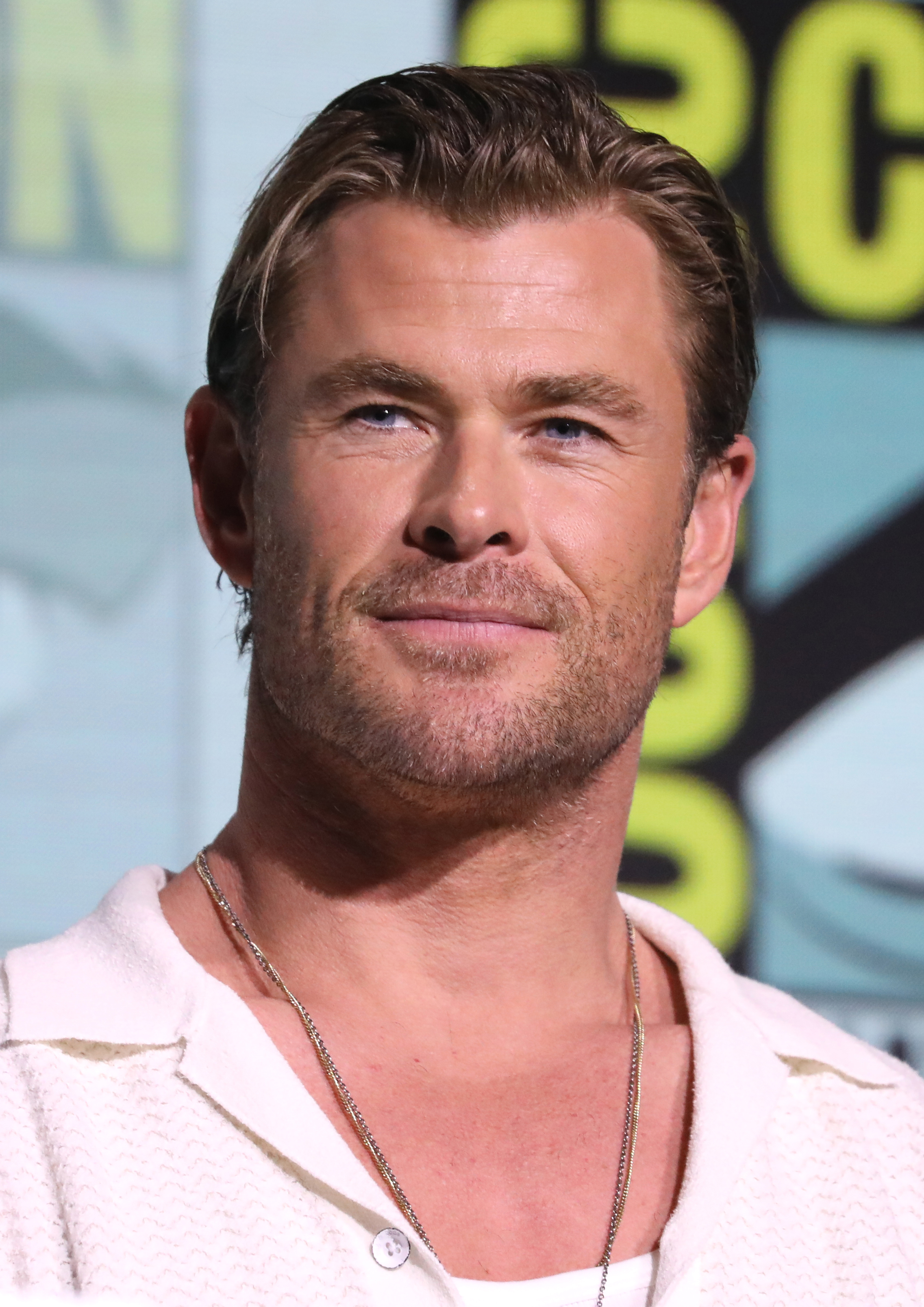
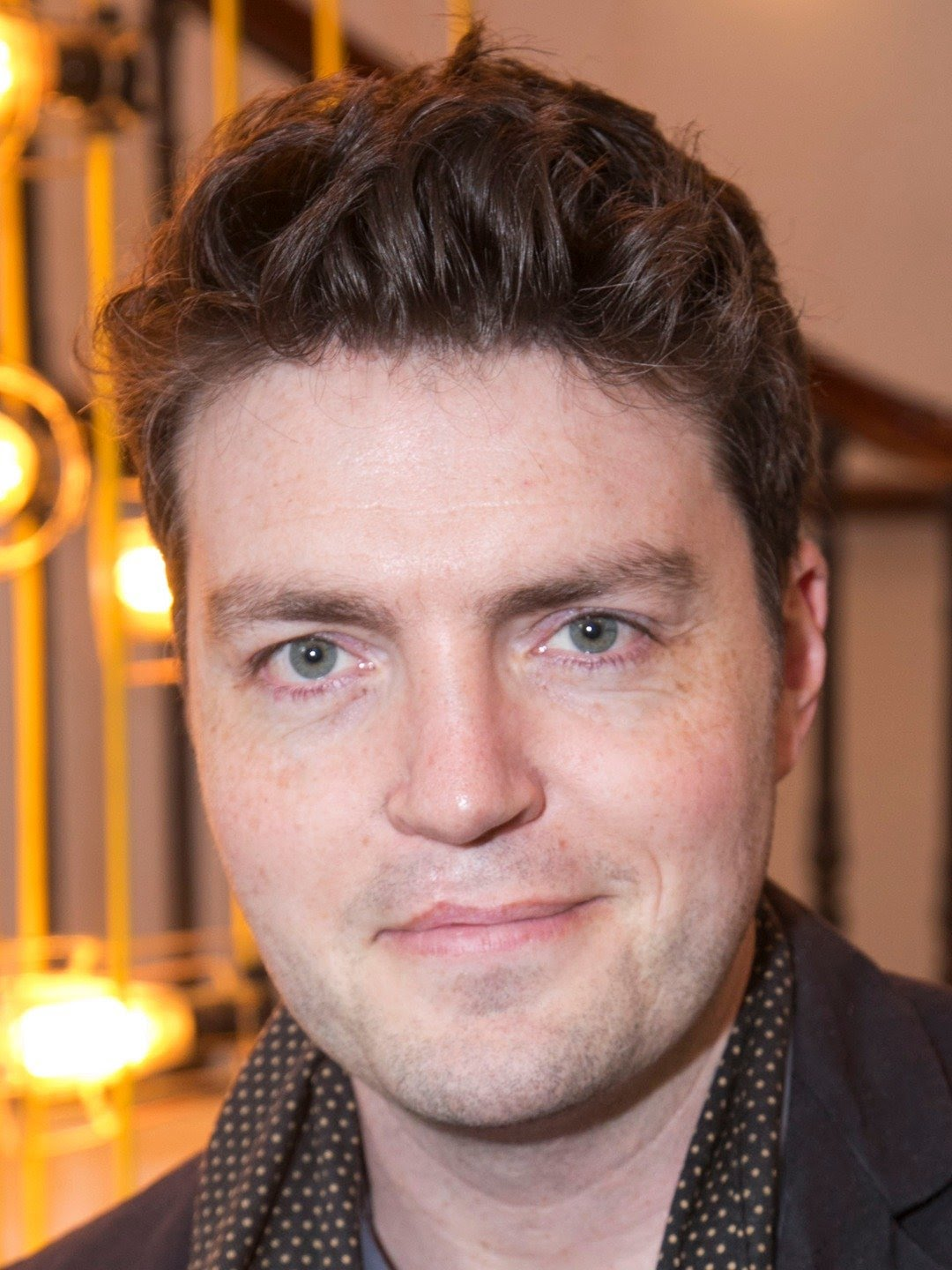
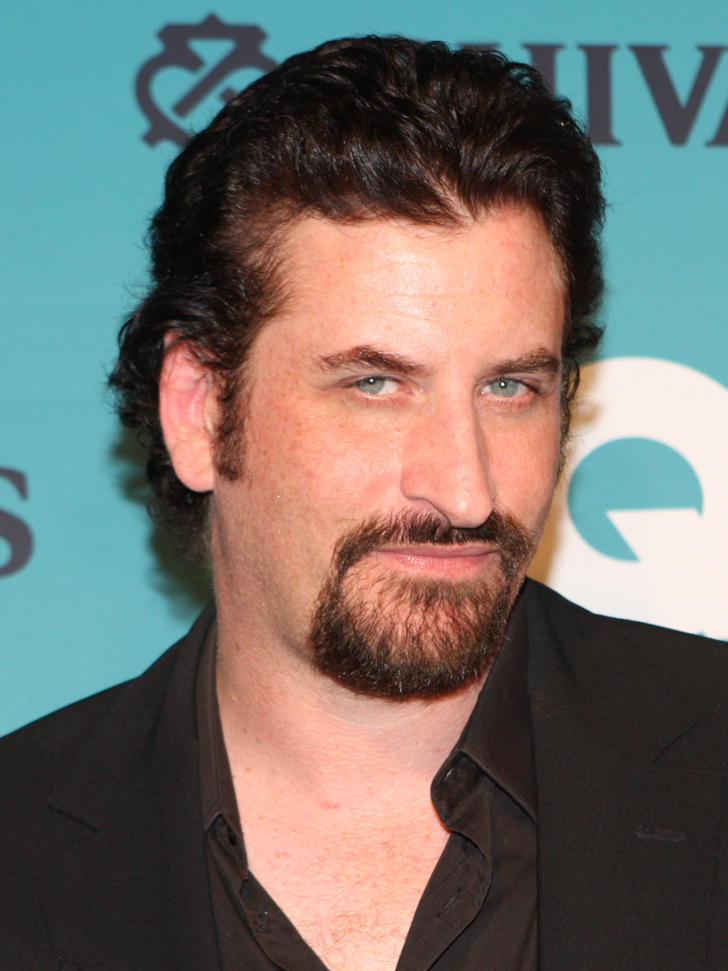
Top: Anya Taylor-Joy and Chris Hemsworth
Bottom: Tom Burke and Lachy Hulme

Miller sought to cast a younger actress for the role in lieu of using de-aging technology for Theron, explaining that the technology still leaves "an uncanny valley" effect. Theron admitted that the decision was "a little heartbreaking, for sure", but understood Miller's rationale. In March 2020, during the COVID-19 lockdown in Australia, Miller auditioned several actresses over Skype for the Furiosa role.

In October 2020, Anya Taylor-Joy, Chris Hemsworth, and Yahya Abdul-Mateen II were cast, although Abdul-Mateen later dropped out due to a scheduling conflict. Miller chose Taylor-Joy after seeing her performance in an early cut of the film Last Night in Soho (2021) and auditioning her with the "Mad as Hell" monologue, quoted by the character Howard Beale (portrayed by Peter Finch) from Sidney Lumet's Network (1976). Edgar Wright, the director of Last Night in Soho, told Miller to "do yourself a favor and grab the opportunity to work with her". Miller felt that "there's a kind of timelessness to her, there's a mystery to her, and yet she's accessible". Taylor-Joy received advice from Nicholas Hoult, who had previously portrayed Nux in Fury Road and worked alongside her in The Menu (2022). According to Goran D. Kleut, who portrayed The Octoboss, Miller asks every actor who auditions with him to try out the "Mad as Hell" monologue.

Hemsworth, an Australian, had grown up watching the Mad Max films. In 2010, he had previously applied for the title role in Fury Road that eventually went to Tom Hardy. Hemsworth later explained that he was not a big enough star at the time to earn the role; his most notable role, Thor, had not yet debuted in the 2011 film of the same name. To accurately portray resource scarcity in the wasteland, Hemsworth cut his calorie intake in half compared to when he prepares for a Marvel Cinematic Universe (MCU) film. Describing and elaborating on his character's motivations, Hemsworth said: "He's a pretty horrible individual. Through the whole film we kept coming back to, 'This is evil, but what is the intention behind it?' It's not just sadistic insanity. There is a real purpose, the wheels are turning, he's plotting and planning and ten steps ahead of everyone else." Amid the character's harshness, Hemsworth imagines Dementus as something of a father figure to Furiosa, adding: "I think that's how he sees himself. I think there's a paternal quality and nature to the relationship in his eyes. [Furiosa] would, I'm sure, argue to her death the complete opposite."

In 2021, Miller cast Alyla Browne as a young Furiosa; she had previously worked with Miller on Three Thousand Years of Longing. Miller said that she reminded him of a young Furiosa and that she impressed him while doing the splits on set. Tom Burke joined the cast in the autumn of 2021 as Praetorian Jack, replacing Abdul-Mateen. Burke said that while most of his scenes were shot sitting down in a truck, he had to spend long hours in the gym becoming "as lithe as possible", given that he might have to safely jump off the War Rig many times in a row until Miller got a take he was satisfied with.

When principal photography commenced in June 2022, the producers disclosed that Nathan Jones and Angus Sampson were set to reprise their roles from Fury Road. They additionally announced that Quaden Bayles, who worked on Three Thousand Years of Longing after a video about his mistreatment at school went viral, would appear in a minor role. During the production, Miller agreed to cast Lachy Hulme, who was already playing the role of Rizzdale Pell, as a younger Immortan Joe, succeeding Fury Road's late Hugh Keays-Byrne, who died in 2020. Miller initially wanted to use a body double for Joe and record his lines in post-production with ADR, but Hulme convinced Miller that he could replicate Keays-Byrne's voice and eyes. "When you are working on a Dr. George Miller movie, there's no pressure on you because you're in an incredibly supportive environment", Hulme said. During pre-production, Hulme fell off a motorcycle while practicing for a scene as Rizzdale Pell. Afterwards, Miller decided all the actor's bike riding would be performed by his stunt double, Chris Matheson.

=== Filming ===
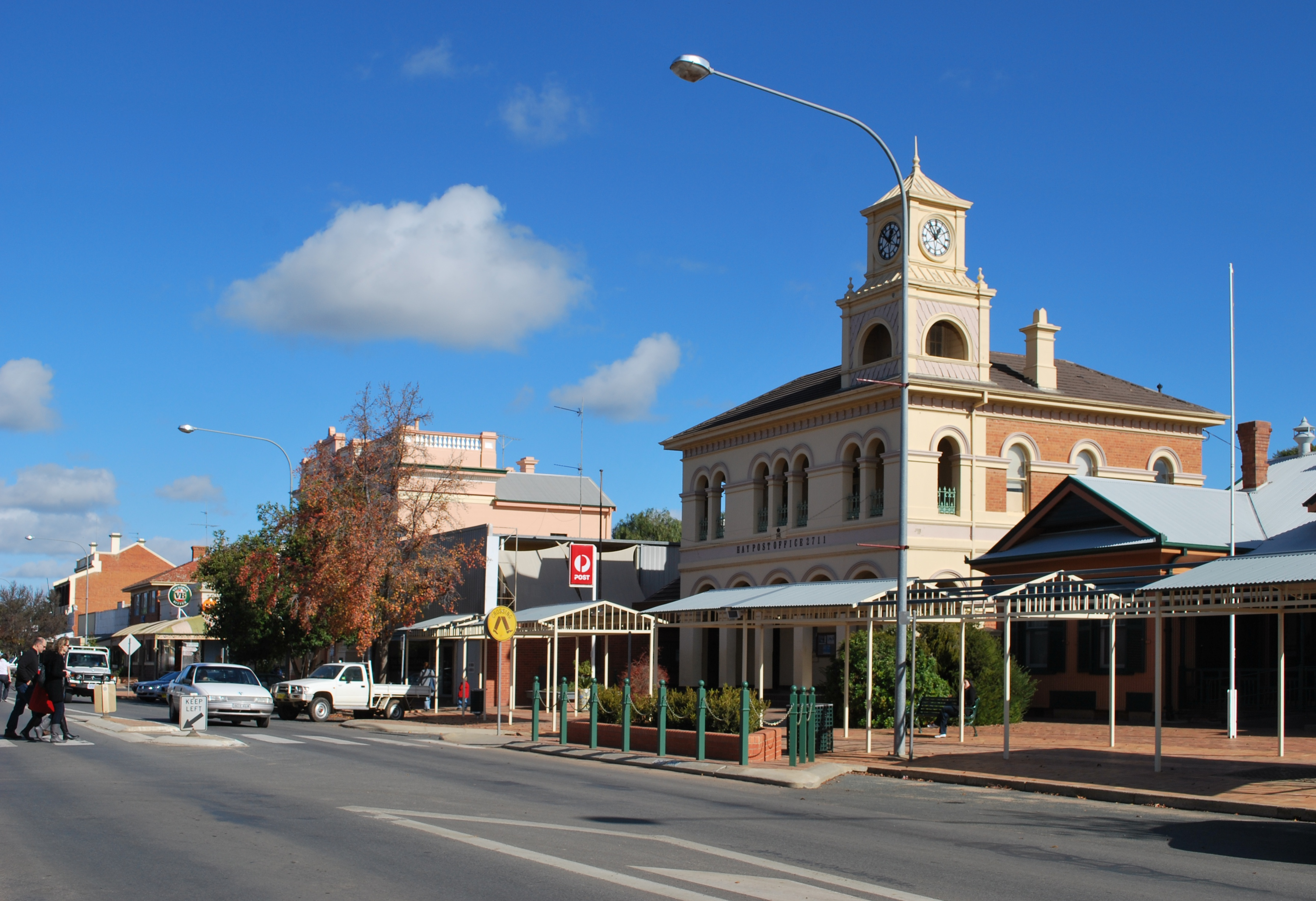
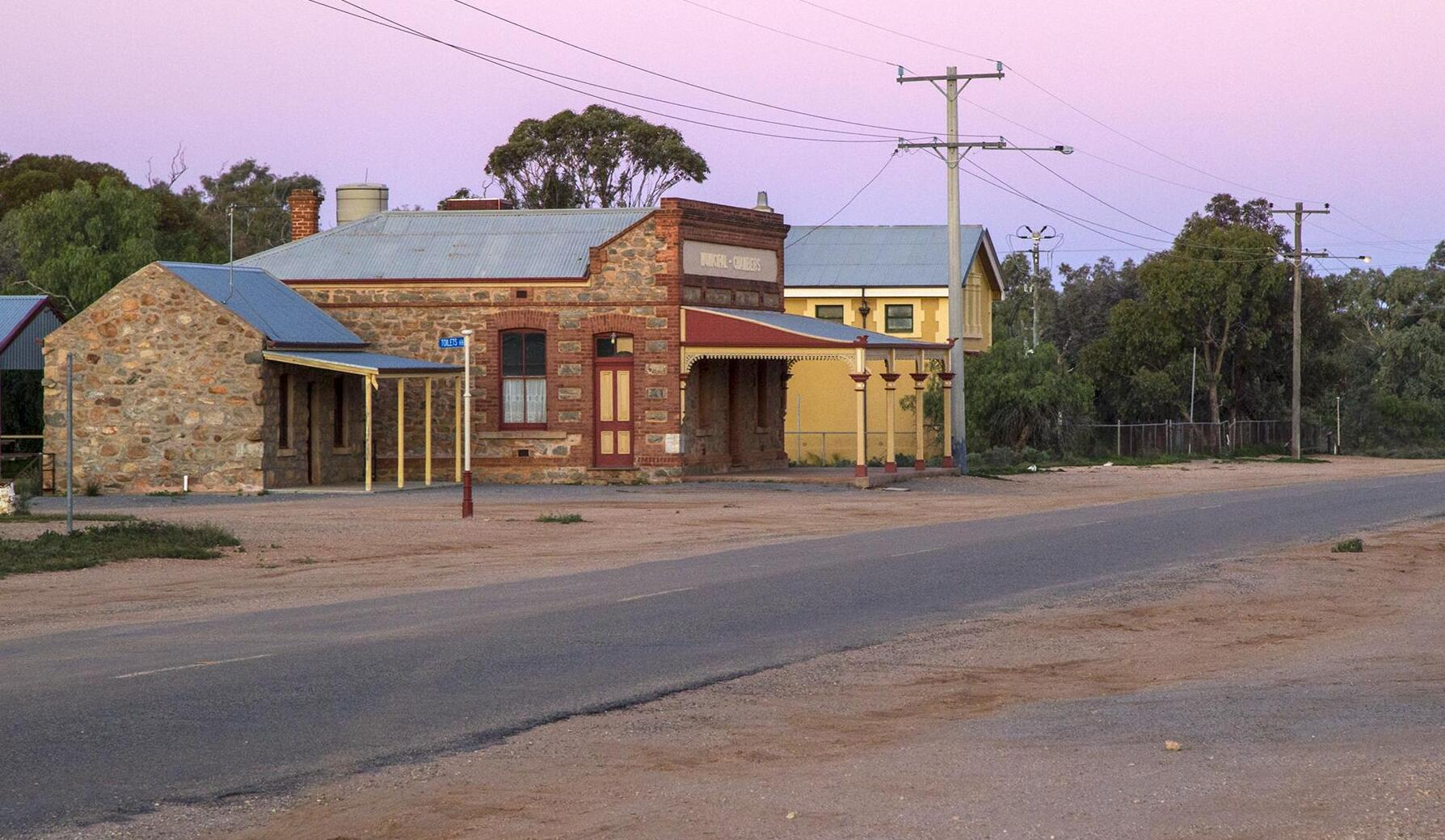
Furiosa: A Mad Max Saga was shot in the New South Wales towns of Hay (left) and Silverton (right), the latter of which is often considered a ghost town, though it has a small population of 48 people; Silverton hosts a Mad Max 2 Museum.

Filming took place in Australia from May to October 2022. Principal photography began on 1 June 2022. Miller shot the film at various locations in New South Wales: Broken Hill/Silverton, Hay (the "Stowaway" action sequence), Kurnell (the Bullet Farm and the final confrontation between Furiosa and Dementus), Terrey Hills (the Green Place), Melrose Park (Gastown), and the Disney lot in Sydney (the Citadel). The action sequence where the raiders ambush the War Rig took 78 days to shoot, where close to 200 stunt performers worked on it every day; the sequence became known during production as "Stowaway to Nowhere".

Miller stated that Furiosa was an easier shoot than Fury Road, alluding to the latter's troubled production, and complimented Warner Bros.' new leadership for implementing an "approach to filmmaking [that was] much more collaborative than it was adversarial". Burke said that Miller wanted a different kind of filming style from Fury Road, which used short takes and long cuts; he noted that Miller specifically wanted to shoot the scene where Dementus taunts Jack and Furiosa in one take.

In lighting most of Furiosa's exterior shots, Duggan and gaffer Shaun Conway recognized that "nearly all of our story would be told during daytime, so everything relied on sunlight", Duggan said. "And because we were in mid-El Niño, the weather during the shoot was unpredictable, with pouring rains and winds up to 50 miles per hour. So, we added a lot of artificial light to create sunlight, which helped us create a harsh look that was quite different than what you'd expect." To augment their locations' natural light, the filmmakers relied on a uniform approach, employing an array of six 18K HMI PARs at varying degrees of spot. "The six PARs were mounted to three heavy-duty telescopic handlers that were easily moveable and could withstand the conditions, and the lamps were protected from the rain", Duggan noted. "We found that the 18K array could cover almost half a football field and accommodated the size of most of our exterior-location sets. We could put the light wherever we wanted to; whenever the sun was coming in and out, we'd follow and match that direction." He continued: "George told us we weren't going to wait for anything to light our sets, so we had to be prepared with one solution. And that meant we didn't have to stop shooting — we could just keep on going. Of course, we always oriented the sets, or our camera, to make use of sidelight or backlight from the actual sun, but the brute power of those PARs gave us all the light we needed."

Taylor-Joy praised Miller's commitment to safety on set, but said that working on the film was, nonetheless, a challenging experience. With just 30-odd spoken lines of dialogue, she would go "months" on the film's set without speaking a single word on camera: "I've never been more alone than making that movie ... I don't want to go too deep into it, but everything that I thought was going to be easy was hard." When asked what proved more difficult than she expected on the Furiosa set, the actress said: "Next question, sorry. Talk to me in 20 years." In a later interview, responding to a question regarding how she was "able to portray the nuance and complexity of Furiosa without much dialogue", Taylor-Joy explained: "[The character] was just immediately there. The second that I read the first script, even though the script changed quite a bit by the time we got to filming, I had her essence very deeply embedded within me. I was also supremely protective. I think I fought more for this character than I had fought for any other character. George had such a specific vision for what he wanted her to be and I just felt like it was my responsibility to fight for any moment where you could see a little bit of her rage come out." Sharing her most memorable note given by Miller throughout the filming process, she said: "[George] wanted [Furiosa] to be incredibly stoic. And I felt like my contribution was that I've always felt like you need to see the humanity behind that, if you want people to fully invest in a character. George encourages you to be in almost like a university-type setting where every choice you have to justify – and you don't justify it once. You justify it thousands of times if it's going to make it in the movie. It was really great training for me not only as an actor but also as somebody that hopes to direct one day. Your conviction has to be unwavering if you want something to make it into one of his movies."

Hemsworth arrived on set nursing a back injury, but said that he was excited to work on Furiosa because playing Dementus allowed him to get "out of that typecast space of the muscly action guy and ... play a character with complications and darkness". He explained that "suffering without a purpose is awful", but "suffering with purpose can be rejuvenating and replenishing". Burke said that Miller was willing to collaborate with his actors to structure Furiosa and Jack's relationship, explaining that while Miller wanted a romance, Burke felt the characters should "push romance to the side until they believe they are riding off to a safer place".

While promoting the film, the actors disclosed several ideas that Miller considered or even shot but ultimately cut. Taylor-Joy said that Miller shot but ultimately deleted a scene where Furiosa cuts off Dementus's tongue, an act which is mentioned but not shown in the theatrical version. Burke said that Miller vetoed the idea of a training montage where Jack teaches Furiosa about road war because it was too much of a cliché.

=== Post-production ===
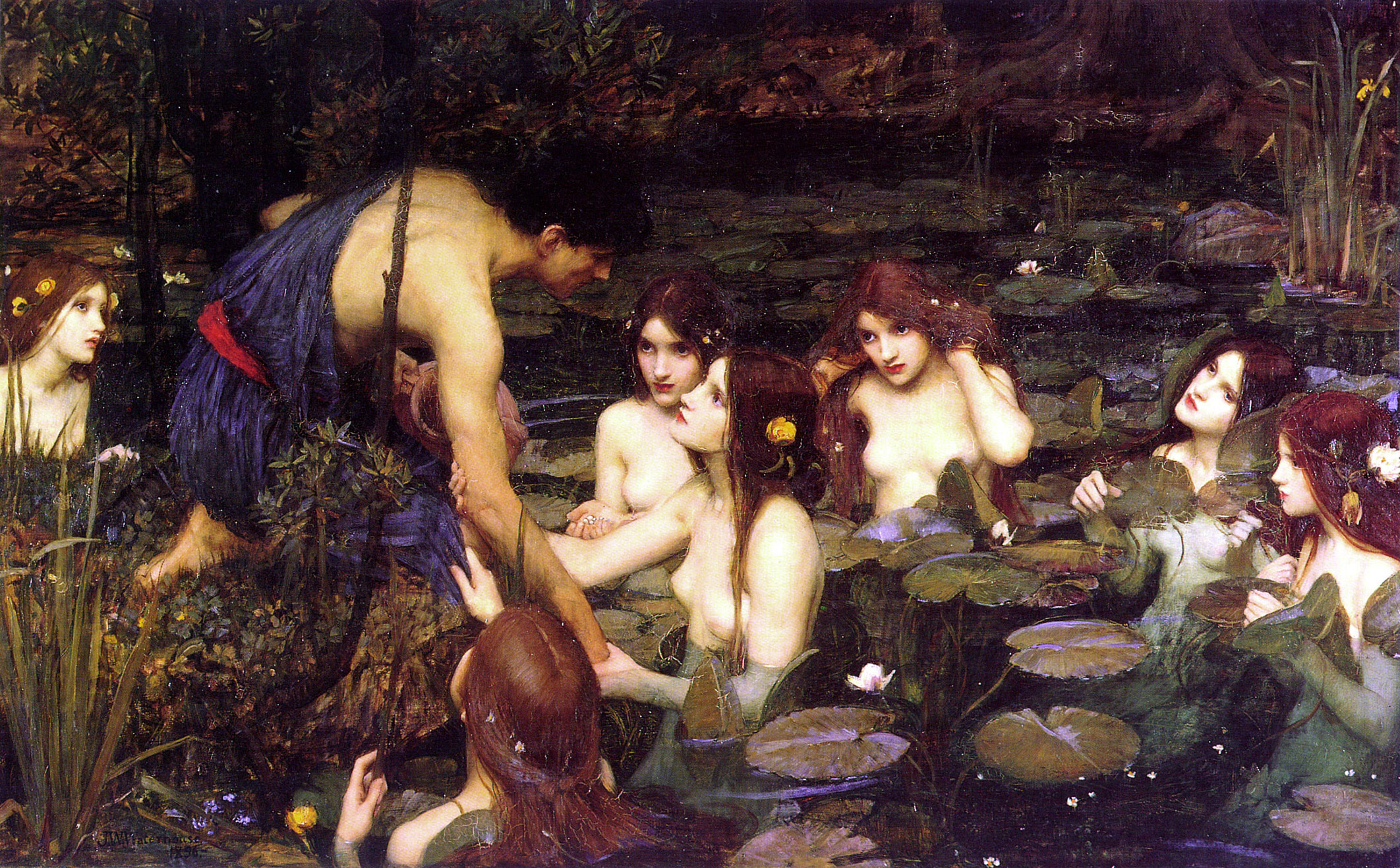
Haunted by his memories of a better past, Dementus vandalizes a copy of J. W. Waterhouse's painting Hylas and the Nymphs (1896) after conquering Gastown; Miller used the painting's verdant, watery setting to contrast with the burned-out desert landscapes of Furiosa.

Fury Road's VFX supervisor Andrew Jackson returned for Furiosa. His home studio DNEG worked with Framestore, Metaphysic.ai, Rising Sun Pictures, and slatevfx. He had received an Academy Award nomination for Fury Road and subsequently won the Oscar for Tenet (2020). Jackson said that Furiosa "leans much more heavily [than Fury Road] on visual effects" and that Miller "completely embraced the idea that CG is the way to go to build worlds and do whatever we need to do in post".

In addition to traditional CGI work, such as augmenting backdrops and stitching together the work of multiple stuntmen who shot their scenes separately for safety reasons, Jackson used VFX to heighten certain action scenes, such as the "Stowaway" action sequence, where VFX animated The Octoboss's demise and the final chase sequence, where a CGI version of Furiosa's (otherwise practical) car was used to animate "things just far too dangerous to be doing with a real car, like side-swiping motorbikes". VFX helped "generat[e] a feeling of movement" by making background elements move faster and animating flying equipment like The Octoboss's rippling black parachute.

As Furiosa ages from a child to a young woman over the course of the film, Miller and Jackson hired Rising Sun Pictures to use machine learning to blend Taylor-Joy's and Browne's faces together. Taylor-Joy said that Miller "wanted the transition ... to be seamless". She spent two days shooting with Rising Sun so that they could map her facial expressions. By her estimate, at the start of the film, about 35% of Browne's face was modified to look like her own, a figure that increased to 80% during Browne's final scenes in the Citadel. Additionally, in Taylor-Joy's early scenes in the Citadel, her eyes were partially modified to look more like Browne's. Taylor-Joy stressed that the actors' union went on strike in part to demand better regulation of AI tools and that Miller's use of AI was consensual. Metaphysic.ai performed a similar function for the Bullet Farmer, blending Lee Perry's facial features with those of the late Richard Carter, who portrayed the Bullet Farmer in Fury Road.

=== Impact on the Australian film industry ===
According to the Australian Broadcasting Corporation (ABC), Furiosa was the most expensive film in Australian history, with a budget of AU$333.2 million. Over 3,000 people worked on the film, including some ex-convicts who were hired as supporting artists. In addition, to take advantage of Australian tax credits for VFX work, DNEG opened a Sydney branch to spearhead special effects work on Furiosa; it estimated that the office, once fully staffed, would employ up to 500 VFX artists.

The film was awarded extensive government subsidies, including a filming incentive from the New South Wales government and various "offsets from the federal government". Miller said that government support "made [shooting in Australia] possible". Queensland University of Technology professor Amanda Lotz estimated that Screen NSW contributed AU$50 million in direct subsidies to Furiosa's budget. Additionally, the federal government offers all qualifying films a tax rebate equivalent to 40% of the amount of money the production spends in Australia. Lotz estimated this federal rebate at AU$133 million (40% of AU$333.2 million), and NSW premier Gladys Berejiklian said that she hoped Furiosa would contribute AU$350 million to the Australian economy. Although a May 2024 ABC report estimated the size of the NSW filming incentive as AU$175 million (over half the film's reported budget), the ABC subsequently amended its report to remove that estimate. Other reports suggested that the AU$175 million figure applies to the total size of the NSW subsidy fund (spread out over five years) and not to Furiosa specifically.

Furiosa's VFX artists allowed production to keep shooting in Australia even though the weather in New South Wales was not ideal for a desert-based film. By contrast, Miller had to move the Fury Road shoot from Australia to Namibia because rain caused wildflowers to grow in the Australian desert, which would not have happened in a post-apocalyptic wasteland. According to Framestore, during the opening chase sequence where Mary tracks Furiosa's kidnappers through a series of sand dunes, "we ended up pretty much having to replace all of the ground". Colourist Eric Whipp, who also worked on Fury Road, said that because the desert scenes needed to look like Namibia and "there was a huge mix of sunny and cloudy days" during the shoot, "a lot of the backgrounds in this film are full CG".

== Music ==
Fury Road composer Tom Holkenborg (also known as Junkie XL) returned to score Furiosa, as his third collaboration with Miller after Fury Road and Three Thousand Years of Longing. Holkenborg moved to Sydney to pen the score and also helped prepare the final mix. He explained that because Furiosa was a character-driven film, the film's score had to be character-driven as well: "Musically, everything was being told from a first-person perspective, which is being her [Furiosa], how she, watches the world around her, The Wasteland, its cruelties."

Holkenborg added that Miller wanted a "way, way more subtle score" for Furiosa than Fury Road, the latter of which was "just massive action over 48 hours" and an "over-the-top rock opera". In particular, Miller vetoed reusing the song "Brothers in Arms" from Fury Road (which plays when Max and Furiosa help each other escape the Rock Rider canyon) during the Bullet Farm action sequence because he wanted to focus the audience's attention on the fact that Furiosa was willing to sacrifice her best chance at finding the Green Place to save Jack's life, and directed Holkenborg to use Fury Road's musical motifs for the Green Place instead. Miller explained that the Bullet Farm sequence needed to be "kind of a love story in the middle of an action scene". He wanted to show that "through their actions, [Furiosa and Jack] actually are prepared to give of themselves entirely to the other".

Furthermore, Holkenborg "used AI to make deep fake voices from another voice", explaining: "What if the source sound was a drum rhythm, and what if the destination sound was an electric guitar? But the software doesn't know what to make of it. So it gave us a happy accident that we used throughout the score". Warner Bros. in-house record label WaterTower Music released the official soundtrack album on 17 May 2024.

== Marketing ==
On 29 November 2023, the Warner Bros. booth at CCXP featured a first-look image of Taylor-Joy's Furiosa. The following day, the teaser trailer of the film was released. On 19 March 2024, the official trailer debuted. At CinemaCon, Warner Bros. screened extended footage of the film on 9 April; Miller, Taylor-Joy, and Hemsworth appeared together for the first time in public to promote the film.

Running about five minutes, the extended preview shown at CinemaCon revealed that the film would be split into three distinct chapters ("Her Odyssey Begins", "A Warrior Awakens", and "A Ride Into Vengeance"). The final film actually features a total of five chapters: "The Pole of Inaccessibility", "Lessons from the Wasteland", "The Stowaway", "Homeward", and "Beyond Vengeance".

A trio of first-look images from the film were released exclusively by Total Film on 19 April. On 16 May, an extended sneak peek (Note: Titled as "FURIOSA: A MAD MAX SAGA | Sneak Peek 'Chapters' Trailer" on the Warner Bros. YouTube channel) was released by Odeon Cinemas and was released on YouTube the following day.

== Release ==
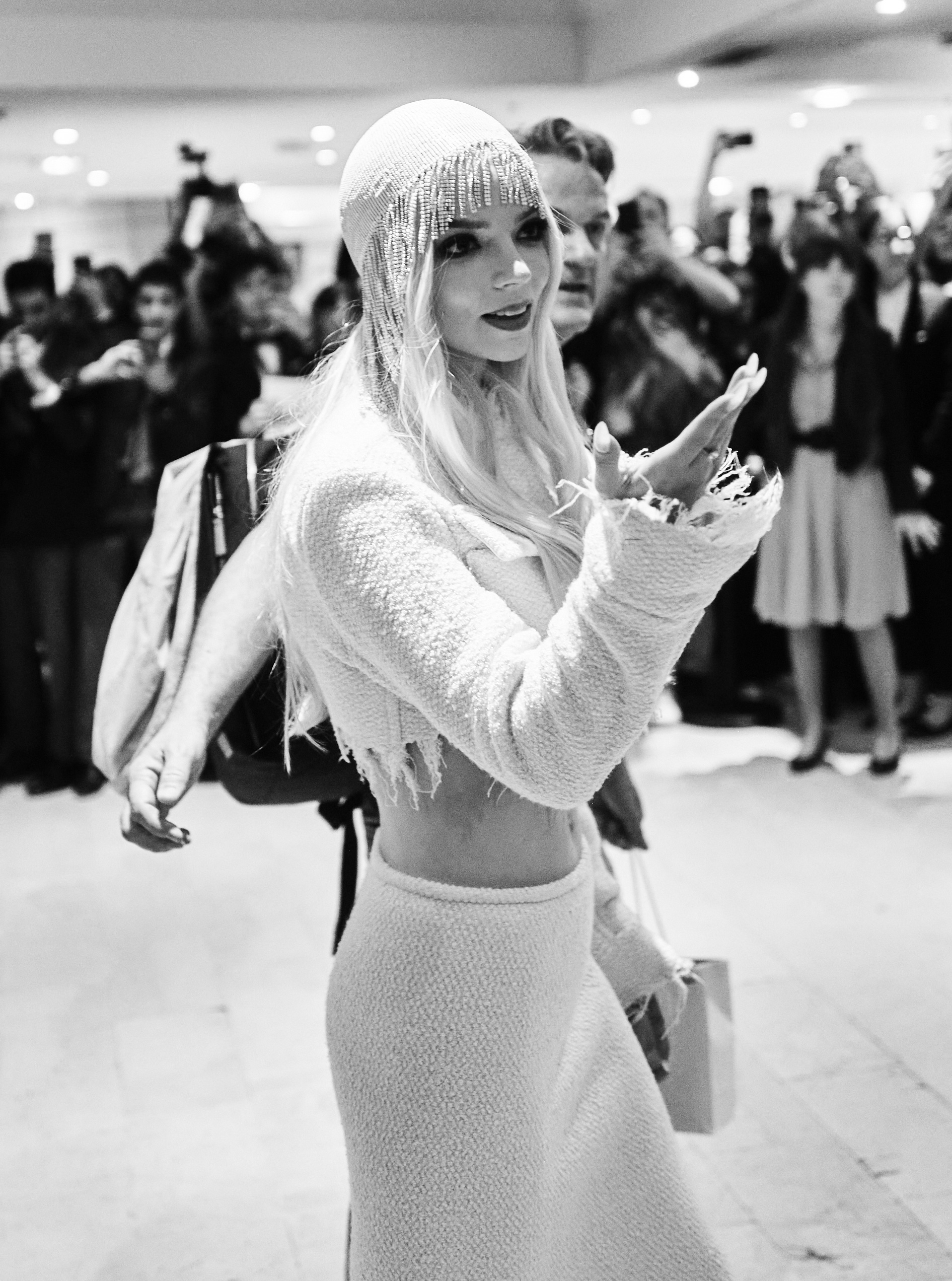
Taylor-Joy in Cannes the day following the film's premiere in May 2024

=== Theatrical ===
Furiosa: A Mad Max Saga had its world premiere at the 77th Cannes Film Festival, screening out-of-competition, on 15 May 2024. The film was released theatrically in Australia and India on 23 May 2024, and in the United States on 24 May 2024. It was originally scheduled to be released on 23 June 2023, but was delayed to May 2024. The film opened in China on 7 June 2024, becoming the first Mad Max film to be theatrically released there.

=== Home media ===
In May 2024, on the Happy Sad Confused podcast, Miller confirmed that the film would be receiving a black-and-white treatment, similar to what he did for Fury Road (referred to as the "Black & Chrome" edition) in 2016, expressing his interest in black-and-white as a format for film.

The film was released on VOD and digital platforms on 24 June. Following its digital release, it was reported that Furiosa led the home viewing charts. The film came in at #1 on the iTunes VOD chart for 1 July and held the same position on the Fandango at Home chart (Note: iTunes ranks films daily by number of transactions, while Fandango at Home lists by revenue.) for the week of 24–30 June.

It was released on 4K UHD, Blu-ray, and DVD on 13 August. Special features include the hour-long behind-the-scenes documentary "Highway to Valhalla: In Pursuit of Furiosa", which interweaves concept art, set footage and interviews with cast and crew, providing an overview of the project from conception to post-production, while shorter featurettes delve into Furiosa and Dementus, and Taylor-Joy's and Hemsworth's performances. An extended breakdown of the "Stowaway" action sequence is also included. The disc is rounded out by a featurette on the film's vehicular designs and their construction. The same day, Furiosa: A Mad Max Saga Black & Chrome Edition was released simultaneously on 4K Ultra HD Blu-ray and digital streaming, and is also featured in the "Mad Max 5-Film 4K Collector's Edition", which was released on 24 September. The film became available for streaming on Max on 16 August. On 30 December, alongside Fury Road, the film became available to stream on Netflix.

== Reception ==
=== Box office ===
Furiosa: A Mad Max Saga grossed $67.6 million in the United States and Canada, and $105.3 million in other territories, for a worldwide total of $174.4 million. The film's box-office performance has been deemed a failure. Critics and film pundits noted that the franchise's limited appeal in general and prequels, in particular, contributed to poor box-office performance. Variety reported that industry insiders estimated that Furiosa needed to gross $350–375 million to turn a profit and that it would end up losing $75–95 million for the studio and its co-funders. However, a Warner Bros. spokesperson claimed that the film had a lower break-even point. As much as half of the film's budget was covered by the NSW and Australian federal governments. In April 2025, Deadline Hollywood calculated the film lost the studio $119.6 million, when factoring together all expenses and revenues.

==== Performance ====
In the United States, Furiosa's $32.3 million gross in its four-day opening weekend was described as "disappointing"; industry analysts had projected $40 million. Of that $32.3 million, the film earned $10.4 million on its first Friday, including an estimated $3.5 million from Thursday night previews, the latter of which was similar to the $3.7 million made by Fury Road. Although Furiosa was the highest-grossing film during the Memorial Day weekend, beating The Garfield Movie and Sight, that weekend had the lowest total box-office receipts since 1995, and Furiosa was the lowest-grossing film to finish in first over Memorial Day since Casper ($22 million before inflation adjustment; also released in 1995).

Furiosa's $10.8 million second weekend (a 59% drop from the opening weekend, excluding Memorial Day itself) was also considered a disappointment, as The Garfield Movie dropped only 42% and won the weekend; for comparison, Fury Road had a 46% drop in its second weekend. As a whole, ticket sales for that weekend were down 65% from 2023. Domestic receipts fell an additional 61% in the third weekend, when Furiosa was pre-scheduled to surrender its premium large format screens, which are typically booked months in advance, to the premiere weekend of Bad Boys: Ride or Die. Furiosa's domestic box-office relied heavily on PLF screens.

Internationally, Furiosa grossed $33.3 million in the first three days, industry analysts had projected $40–45 million. A week prior, the film had opened at number one in Australia, earning AUD$3.33 million. During its second weekend, Furiosa performed relatively better in international markets, grossing $21 million, which Deadline Hollywood called "a good 38% drop ... but coming off a low base". The film premiered in Japan on 31 May 2024, one week behind the United States, and became the first non-Japanese film of 2024 to debut at number one. Reported by Variety, it also held the number one spot in China on its first day (7 June), over the country's Dragon Boat Festival holiday weekend, but its $3.58 million take in its first three-day weekend left it outside the top five. However, The Hollywood Reporter reported that the film opened in sixth place with $3.7 million as a batch of local releases dominated ticket sales; Chinese ticketing app Maoyan forecasted Furiosa to finish its run with about $7.5 million.

==== Analysis ====
Industry analysts identified a variety of reasons for Furiosa's opening weekend, which was considered weak in light of what film consultant David A. Gross called "outstanding reviews and a good audience score". The opening weekend was not entirely unexpected; in April 2024, Deadline Hollywood reported that "some" sources were expecting Furiosa to compete neck-and-neck with The Garfield Movie. However, following Furiosa's disappointing second weekend, an anonymous studio executive told a reporter that "it's mind-numbing that Furiosa hasn't grossed $50 million domestically." Gross and The Hollywood Reporter's Pamela McClintock wrote that Furiosa was hurt by the industry-wide disruption to the film production schedule caused by the 2023 Hollywood labor disputes, a position that (according to The New York Times) the film studios had been pushing for several months. According to Gross: "Moviegoing thrives on momentum and rhythm: one strong movie after another bringing fans to the multiplex once or more per month. Right now, the schedule is thin."

Despite being a female-fronted action film, Furiosa's opening weekend viewership skewed heavily male (72%) and young (55% of viewers were between ages 18–34). TheWrap's Jeremy Fuster speculated that one of the reasons for the "awful" underperformance was because the film is not a four-quadrant tentpole, writing: "Furiosa wasn't ever expected to be a Fast & Furious or Disney remake-level moneymaker for theaters, skewing more towards male audiences and to longtime Mad Max fans." Forbes' Paul Tassi praised Hemsworth and Taylor-Joy's performances, but questioned whether Furiosa commanded the same kind of brand recognition as a traditional IP-led tentpole feature, given that it was "a prequel spin-off of a side character in Fury Road who is not even being played by the same actress this time". After Bad Boys: Ride or Die debuted above expectations, box-office analyst Scott Mendelson tweeted that "sequels soar, prequels stumble, and 'originals' struggle, just like nearly every other summer".

Furiosa's domestic grosses disproportionately came from premium large format screenings (PLFs) like IMAX and Dolby Cinema, which command higher ticket prices than screenings in regular theatres, and (according to Warner Bros. executives) may appeal more to diehard fans. In its opening weekend, 54% of Furiosa's domestic gross came from PLFs, compared to 48% for Oppenheimer, 44% for Dune: Part Two, 42% for Mission: Impossible – Dead Reckoning Part One, and 37% for Indiana Jones and the Dial of Destiny. Conversely, Screen Rant's Kate Bove suggested that Hollywood studios' eagerness to push content onto their own streaming services had encouraged everyday filmgoers to put off watching Furiosa in theatres on the assumption that Warner Bros. would "quickly transition" Furiosa to Max. She added that high budgets for tentpole features were "rais[ing] the bar for box office success".

Several critics and filmmakers urged audiences to watch the film without being put off by its weak box-office results. Vulture's Bilge Ebiri, who praised Miller for taking "a big franchise sequel and turn[ing] it into something strange, sublime, and potentially off-putting", urged analysts to focus on long-term performance and to give Furiosa time to grab a foothold in the marketplace, rather than write off the film based on its opening weekend. Ebiri also pointed to the 2023 cultural phenomenon of "Barbenheimer" (Barbie and Oppenheimer), which accumulated 75% of its total grosses after the opening weekend due to strong word of mouth. Director Wes Ball, whose film Kingdom of the Planet of the Apes had moved up its release date to avoid directly competing with Furiosa, encouraged people to go and watch the film on the big screen on Twitter by tweeting: "Like the movie or not, creative swings like this don't come around often. When they do, try to enjoy the ambition of it all in a great theater ... Furiosa was made because Fury Road was beloved, not because it was a box office hit."

=== Critical response ===
On the review aggregator website Rotten Tomatoes, 90% of 419 critics' reviews are positive, with an average rating of 7.9/10. The website's consensus reads: "Retroactively enriching Fury Road with greater emotional heft if not quite matching it in propulsive throttle, Furiosa is another glorious swerve in mastermind George Miller's breathless race towards cinematic Valhalla." Metacritic, which uses a weighted average, assigned the film a score of 79 out of 100, based on 64 critics, indicating "generally favorable" reviews. Audiences polled by CinemaScore gave the film an average grade of "B+" on an A+ to F scale, the same as Fury Road, while those polled by PostTrak gave the film an average of 4 1/2 stars out of 5, with 70% saying they would definitely recommend it.

Writing for RogerEbert.com, Robert Daniels awarded the film 4 out of 4 stars, and called it "one of the best prequels ever made". He praised the action sequences, performances, and storyline. Pete Hammond of Deadline Hollywood viewed the film as possessing "the best screenplay of any Mad Max film". The Guardian's Peter Bradshaw called Taylor-Joy "an overwhelmingly convincing action heroine". Writing for Empire, John Nugent awarded the film 5 out of 5 stars, and described Taylor-Joy as "phenomenal", finding the "right balance of steeliness and fractured humanity that Theron instilled". Jada Yuan from The Washington Post thought that Hemsworth had "created one of the all-time-great screen villains" and Jake Wilson of The Sydney Morning Herald saw him "steal[ing] the show".

In a critical review, Owen Gleiberman of Variety perceived Furiosa as "franchise overkill" and as filled with "pretension". Nicholas Barber of the BBC also disliked some aspects of the film, giving it 3 out of 5 stars. He viewed the plot as meandering and as draining, writing: "You soon reach the point where you're sick of sand, sick of explosions, sick of off-puttingly sadistic violence." Stephanie Zacharek's review in Time similarly criticised the film as "a slog that's working hard to persuade us we're having a good time". John McDonald of the Australian Financial Review opined that part of the film's "failure may be attributed to the writing, but also to Hemsworth's woodenness as an actor".

In July 2024, Theron confirmed she had seen the film, stating: "It's amazing, it's a beautiful film." When asked if she had talked to Taylor-Joy at all throughout the process or since its release, Theron said: "No, we've really been trying to connect. It's been one of those – we can actually make a comedy out of it. We keep running into each other and in places when we don't have time to really talk to each other, so we're constantly like, 'Oh my god, OK, let's get together!' And then life takes over. But it will happen when it's right."

By year's end, RogerEbert.com critic Matt Zoller Seitz, along with Cortlyn Kelly, named Furiosa as the best of the top ten films of 2024. having called it "a triumph from George Miller" despite its imperfections and "a film in the tradition of other late-career masterpieces by great directors, clearly less interested in recycling the same established templates yet again, and revisiting familiar themes and situations that were once presented more straightforwardly with a more ambivalent or complicated attitude." Lucas Kloberdanz-Dyck, writer for Collider, ranked it as the best action film of the year, writing: "Furiosa produces another classic tale of vengeance. This movie is a worthy entry in the Mad Max franchise and continues to revolutionize action movies with impressive practical stunts. The oil tanker scene alone is one of the best sequences in an action movie, but the nonstop narrative has exhilarating and heart-pumping moments that establish Furiosa as one of the greatest action movies ever, let alone the best of 2024."

Many filmmakers, including Maggie Betts, Davy Chou, Robert Eggers, Jeff Fowler, Drew Goddard, Luca Guadagnino, Don Hertzfeldt, David Lowery, Pascal Plante, Celine Song, Nacho Vigalondo and Adam Wingard cited the film as among their favorites of 2024.

In June 2025, IndieWire ranked the film at number 24 on its list of "The 100 Best Movies of the 2020s (So Far)."

== Accolades ==
Award	Date of ceremony	Category	Recipient(s)	Result	Ref.
AACTA Awards	5 & 7 February 2025	Best Film	Furiosa: A Mad Max Saga	Nominated	
AACTA Awards	5 & 7 February 2025	Best Direction	George Miller	Nominated	
AACTA Awards	5 & 7 February 2025	Best Lead Actress	Anya Taylor-Joy	Nominated	
AACTA Awards	5 & 7 February 2025	Best Supporting Actor	Chris Hemsworth	Nominated	
AACTA Awards	5 & 7 February 2025	Best Supporting Actress	Alyla Browne	Nominated	
AACTA Awards	5 & 7 February 2025	Best Screenplay	George Miller and Nico Lathouris	Nominated	
AACTA Awards	5 & 7 February 2025	Best Casting	Nikki Barrett	Nominated	
AACTA Awards	5 & 7 February 2025	Best Cinematography	Simon Duggan	Won	
AACTA Awards	5 & 7 February 2025	Best Costume Design	Jenny Beavan	Won	
AACTA Awards	5 & 7 February 2025	Best Editing	Eliot Knapman and Margaret Sixel	Nominated	
AACTA Awards	5 & 7 February 2025	Best Hair & Makeup	Lesley Vanderwalt, Larry Van Duynhoven, Matteo Silvi, and Luca Vannella	Won	
AACTA Awards	5 & 7 February 2025	Best Original Score	Tom Holkenborg	Nominated	
AACTA Awards	5 & 7 February 2025	Best Production Design	Colin Gibson and Katie Sharrock	Won	
AACTA Awards	5 & 7 February 2025	Best Sound	Rob Mackenzie, Ben Osmo, James Ashton, Yulia Akerholt, Jessica Meier, and Tom Holkenborg	Won	
AACTA Awards	5 & 7 February 2025	Best Visual Effects or Animation	Andrew Jackson, Jason Bath, Guido Wolter, Rachel Copp, and Andy Williams (Rising Sun Pictures)	Nominated	
AACTA International Awards	7 February 2025	Best Direction	George Miller	Nominated	
ACE Eddie Awards	14 March 2025	Best Edited Feature Film (Drama, Theatrical)	Eliot Knapman and Margaret Sixel	Nominated	
Alliance of Women Film Journalists	7 January 2025	Best Editing	Eliot Knapman and Margaret Sixel	Nominated	
Alliance of Women Film Journalists	7 January 2025	EDA Female Focus: Best Stunt Performance	Hayley Wright (for Anya Taylor-Joy)	Nominated	
Art Directors Guild Awards	15 February 2025	Excellence in Production Design for a Fantasy Feature Film	Colin Gibson	Nominated	
Astra Awards	8 December 2024	Best Action or Science Fiction Feature	Furiosa: A Mad Max Saga	Nominated	
Astra Awards	8 December 2024	Best Costume Design	Jenny Beavan	Nominated	
Astra Awards	8 December 2024	Best Makeup and Hairstyling	Furiosa: A Mad Max Saga	Nominated	
Astra Awards	8 December 2024	Best Sound	Furiosa: A Mad Max Saga	Nominated	
Astra Awards	8 December 2024	Best Stunts	Furiosa: A Mad Max Saga	Nominated	
Astra Awards	8 December 2024	Best Stunt Coordinator	Guy Norris	Nominated	
Astra Awards	8 December 2024	Best Visual Effects	Furiosa: A Mad Max Saga	Nominated	
Astra Midseason Movie Awards	3 July 2024	Best Picture	Furiosa: A Mad Max Saga	Nominated	
Astra Midseason Movie Awards	3 July 2024	Best Director	George Miller	Nominated	
Astra Midseason Movie Awards	3 July 2024	Best Actress	Anya Taylor-Joy	Runner-up	
Astra Midseason Movie Awards	3 July 2024	Best Supporting Actor	Chris Hemsworth	Nominated	
Astra Midseason Movie Awards	3 July 2024	Best Stunts	Furiosa: A Mad Max Saga	Runner-up	
Austin Film Critics Association	6 January 2025	Best Stunt Work	Furiosa: A Mad Max Saga	Nominated	
Australian Directors' Guild Awards	22 November 2024	Best Direction of a Feature Film (Budget $1.5 M or over)	George Miller	Won (Note: Shared with Paul Middleditch and Hamish Bennett for Uproar (2023))	
Chicago Film Critics Association	11 December 2024	Best Picture	Furiosa: A Mad Max Saga	Nominated	
Chicago Film Critics Association	11 December 2024	Best Costume Design	Jenny Beavan	Won	
Chicago Film Critics Association	11 December 2024	Best Editing	Eliot Knapman and Margaret Sixel	Nominated	
Chicago Film Critics Association	11 December 2024	Best Use of Visual Effects	Furiosa: A Mad Max Saga	Nominated	
Costume Designers Guild Awards	6 February 2025	Excellence in Fantasy Film	Jenny Beavan	Nominated	
Critics Choice Awards	7 February 2025	Best Young Actor/Actress	Alyla Browne	Nominated	
Georgia Film Critics Association	7 January 2025	Best Production Design	Colin Gibson and Katie Sharrock	Nominated	
Golden Reel Awards	23 February 2025	Outstanding Achievement in Sound Editing – Feature Effects / Foley	Supervising Sound Editor: Robert Mackenzie; Sound Effects Editors: Tom Heuzenroeder and Tara Webb; Foley Editors: Duncan Campbell and Adrian Medhurst	Nominated	
Golden Trailer Awards	30 May 2024	Best Action Poster	One Sheet (WORKS ADV)	Nominated	
Golden Trailer Awards	30 May 2024	Best Fantasy/Adventure	"Home" (X/AV)	Nominated	
Golden Trailer Awards	30 May 2024	Summer 2024 Blockbuster Trailer	Trailer Park Group	Nominated	
Hollywood Music in Media Awards	20 November 2024	Best Original Score – Sci-Fi/Fantasy Film	Tom Holkenborg	Nominated	
Hollywood Professional Association Awards	7 November 2024	Outstanding Color Grading – Live Action Theatrical Feature	Eric Whipp (Alter Ego)	Nominated	
Hollywood Professional Association Awards	7 November 2024	Outstanding Editing – Theatrical Feature	Eliot Knapman and Margaret Sixel	Nominated	
Houston Film Critics Society	14 January 2025	Best Stunt Coordination Team	Furiosa: A Mad Max Saga	Nominated	
Kansas City Film Critics Circle	4 January 2025	Best Supporting Actor	Chris Hemsworth	Nominated	
Kansas City Film Critics Circle	4 January 2025	Best Stunt Ensemble Film	Furiosa: A Mad Max Saga	Nominated	
Location Managers Guild International Awards	24 August 2024	Outstanding Locations in a Period Feature Film	Furiosa: A Mad Max Saga	Nominated	
National Board of Review	4 December 2024	Top Ten Films	Furiosa: A Mad Max Saga	Honored	
National Board of Review	4 December 2024	Outstanding Achievement in Stunt Artistry	Furiosa: A Mad Max Saga	Honored	
Online Film Critics Society	27 January 2025	Best Costume Design	Furiosa: A Mad Max Saga	Nominated	
Online Film Critics Society	27 January 2025	Best Production Design	Furiosa: A Mad Max Saga	Nominated	
Online Film Critics Society	27 January 2025	Best Visual Effects	Furiosa: A Mad Max Saga	Nominated	
Online Film Critics Society	27 January 2025	Technical Achievement Award: Stunts	Furiosa: A Mad Max Saga	Honored	
Saturn Awards	2 February 2025	Best Science Fiction Film	Furiosa: A Mad Max Saga	Nominated	
Saturn Awards	2 February 2025	Best Actress	Anya Taylor-Joy	Nominated	
Saturn Awards	2 February 2025	Best Film Editing	Eliot Knapman and Margaret Sixel	Nominated	
Seattle Film Critics Society	16 December 2024	Best Picture	Furiosa: A Mad Max Saga	Nominated	
Seattle Film Critics Society	16 December 2024	Best Supporting Actor	Chris Hemsworth	Nominated	
Seattle Film Critics Society	16 December 2024	Best Cinematography	Simon Duggan	Nominated	
Seattle Film Critics Society	16 December 2024	Best Costume Design	Jenny Beavan	Nominated	
Seattle Film Critics Society	16 December 2024	Best Editing	Eliot Knapman and Margaret Sixel	Won	
Seattle Film Critics Society	16 December 2024	Best Production Design	Colin Gibson and Katie Sharrock	Nominated	
Seattle Film Critics Society	16 December 2024	Best Visual Effects	Andrew Jackson and Dan Bethell	Nominated	
Seattle Film Critics Society	16 December 2024	Best Action Choreography	Tim Wong (Stunt Coordinator) / Richard Norton (Fight Choreographer)	Won	
Seattle Film Critics Society	16 December 2024	Best Youth Performance	Alyla Browne	Nominated	
Seattle Film Critics Society	16 December 2024	Villain of the Year	Dementus (as portrayed by Chris Hemsworth)	Won	
Set Decorators Society of America Awards	7 February 2025	Best Achievement in Décor/Design of a Fantasy or Science Fiction Film	Set Decoration by Katie Sharrock with Production Design by Colin Gibson	Nominated	
St. Louis Film Critics Association	15 December 2024	Best Action Film	Furiosa: A Mad Max Saga	Won	
St. Louis Film Critics Association	15 December 2024	Best Stunts	Furiosa: A Mad Max Saga	Runner-up	
St. Louis Film Critics Association	15 December 2024	Best Visual Effects	Furiosa: A Mad Max Saga	Nominated	
St. Louis Film Critics Association	15 December 2024	Best Scene	War Rig battle	Runner-up	
Visual Effects Society	11 February 2025	Emerging Technology Award	John Bastian, Ben Ward, Thomas Rowntree, and Robert Beveridge (for "Artist-driven Machine Learning Character")	Nominated	
Washington D.C. Area Film Critics Association	8 December 2024	Best Stunts	Furiosa: A Mad Max Saga	Nominated	
Washington D.C. Area Film Critics Association	8 December 2024	Best Youth Performance	Alyla Browne	Nominated	

== Future ==
In the days after the film's disappointing opening weekend, pundits suggested that it had lowered the chances that Warner Bros. would greenlight Mad Max: The Wasteland, a second Fury Road prequel focusing on Max Rockatansky that Miller had teased for years. At that time (May 2024), The Hollywood Reporter reported that The Wasteland was not yet in development. Miller had previously clarified that The Wasteland's source material (lore and other background material written in preparation for Fury Road) had not yet been adapted into a screenplay. He also said that he was "waiting to see the reception on Furiosa" before taking more concrete steps to develop The Wasteland into a feature film.

Several weeks after the release of Furiosa, Tom Hardy (who was promoting The Bikeriders at the time) said "I don't think it's happening" in an interview, either talking about his involvement in the film or the film itself. In October 2024, while promoting Venom: The Last Dance, Hardy was further asked about whether he'll reprise his role for an additional Mad Max film, responding: "No, I haven't been told anything about it yet, but obviously I'd love to do that ... George already has a script called The Wasteland, which is like quite specific, so I'm aware of that. It depends on whether they're making it."

In February 2025, Miller stated in an interview with Vulture that he was still interested in making The Wasteland despite Furiosa's underperformance at the box office and would do so if given permission by Warner Bros, but he admitted that he wanted to focus on other projects first.
