= Peter Grace (sound engineer) =

Australian production sound mixer

Peter Grace is an Australian production sound mixer. He is best known for his work on critically acclaimed war-drama film Hacksaw Ridge (2016) for which he received the Academy Award for Best Sound Mixing at the 89th Academy Awards, sharing with Robert Mackenzie, Kevin O'Connell and Andy Wright.

== Accolades ==
- Academy Award for Best Sound Mixing – Hacksaw Ridge (won)
- AACTA Award for Best Sound – Hacksaw Ridge (won)
- BAFTA Award for Best Sound – Hacksaw Ridge (nominated)
- Cinema Audio Society Award for Outstanding Achievement in Sound Mixing for a Motion Picture – Live Action – Hacksaw Ridge (nominated)
- Satellite Award for Best Sound – Hacksaw Ridge (won)
