= Richard Flynn (sound engineer) =

New Zealand-British sound engineer

- Occupation: Sound engineer

Richard Flynn is a New Zealand-British sound engineer. He was nominated for an Academy Award in the category Best Sound for the film The Power of the Dog.

== Selected filmography ==
- The Power of the Dog (2021; co-nominated with Robert Mackenzie and Tara Webb)
