= The Last Wave =

1977 film by Peter Weir

- Australian film poster
- Directed by: Peter Weir
- Screenplay by: Peter Weir; Tony Morphett; Petru Popescu
- Produced by: Hal McElroy; Jim McElroy
- Starring: Richard Chamberlain; Olivia Hamnett; Gulpilil; Nandjiwarra Amagula
- Cinematography: Russell Boyd
- Edited by: Max Lemon
- Music by: Charles Wain
- Production companies: McElroy & McElroy; South Australian Film Corporation; Australian Film Commission; Ayer Productions
- Distributed by: United Artists
- Release date: 13 December 1977
- Running time: 106 minutes
- Country: Australia
- Language: English
- Budget: A$818,000
- Box office: A$1.258 million (Australia); $866,250 (US)

The Last Wave (also released in the United States as Black Rain) is a 1977 Australian mystery drama film directed and co-written by Peter Weir, starring Richard Chamberlain, Olivia Hamnett and David Gulpilil (billed as "Gulpilil"). It is about a white solicitor in Sydney whose seemingly normal life is disrupted after he takes on a murder case and discovers that he shares a strange, mystical connection with the small group of local Aboriginal people accused of the crime.

Released by United Artists on December 13, 1977, it received positive reviews from critics and was nominated for seven AFI Awards, including Best Direction, Best Original Screenplay, and Best Actor for Chamberlain. It is considered one of the major works of the Australian New Wave.

== Plot ==
The film opens with a montage of scenes of daily life in Australia in the 1970s— a rural school in the desert with children playing, the main street of an Outback town, a traffic jam in the city— all being affected by unusually adverse weather conditions that suddenly appear. These include heavy rainfall followed by unusually large chunks of hail breaking through the windows of the school injuring students, a frog infestation, and other anomalies. Only the local Aboriginal people seem to recognise the cosmological significance of these weather phenomena.

During one of these freak rainstorms in Sydney, an altercation occurs among a group of Aboriginal people in a pub, which results in a mysterious drowning death. At the coroner's inquest, the death is ruled a homicide and four of the Aboriginal men are accused of murder. Through the Australian Legal Aid system, a lawyer named David Burton is procured for their defence. Due to internal politics and the eschatological divide between the European settlers and Indigenous people, the circumstances by which he was contacted and retained are unusual in that his law practice is corporate taxation and not criminal defence. He is reluctant at first but is intrigued by the challenge and takes on the case. Soon his professional and personal life begin to unravel.

Burton starts having bizarre dreams involving running water and drowned corpses. In another, he is visited in his home by one of the incarcerated Aboriginals, named Chris Lee, whom he had never met. When later introduced to the four accused men, he recognises Lee and begins to sense an otherworldly connection to him and to the increasingly strange weather phenomena besetting the city. His dreams intensify along with his obsession with the murder case. He comes to suspect that the murder was an Aboriginal tribal execution in which a curse is put on the victim simply by pointing a bone at him. Lee refuses to admit that he is tribal or reveal anything about the murder, but tells Burton that his dreams have meaning because he is Mulkurul: descended from a race of spirits who came from the rising sun bringing sacred objects with them. After meeting with the shaman of Lee's tribe and learning more about Aboriginal practices and the concept of Dreamtime as a parallel world of existence, Burton comes to believe that his dreams and the strange heavy rain bode as signs of a coming apocalypse. After another intense dream, Burton senses danger. He persuades his wife to leave the city with their children right before a torrential storm causes a flooding disaster.

In the chaos of the flood, Lee manages to escape from prison to find Burton and take him down through subterranean tunnels under the city which lead to a sacred Aboriginal ritual site. Lee shows him the entrance to another ancient chamber nearby that is strangely familiar to him; Burton is sent off to find the answers that he seeks. In the chamber, Burton sees a painting on the ceiling depicting the arrival of European explorers from South America and a calendrical prophecy of a cataclysmic oceanic disaster. He finds a collection of ancient relics, a decayed corpse of a man wearing medieval Western garments, and a stone mask. After close inspection, he realises this bears a face identical to his own. He collects as many relics as he can carry but is suddenly confronted by the tribe's shaman shouting and lunging at him. They struggle and Burton kills the shaman with one of the stone relics.

He tries to find his way back to the surface through the sewer tunnels, but he loses the relics along the way. He finally emerges through a drain pipe; exhausted, he collapses on the beach and stares at the horizon. Then we see the look of both shock and acceptance on his face as the screen is filled by footage of a surreal towering ocean wave. It remains unclear whether this is reality or Burton's final apocalyptic premonition.

== Cast ==
- Richard Chamberlain as David Burton
- Olivia Hamnett as Annie Burton
- David Gulpilil as Chris Lee
- Fred Parslow as Reverend Burton
- Vivean Gray as Dr Whitburn
- Nandjiwarra Amagula as Charlie
- Walter Amagula as Gerry Lee
- Roy Bara as Larry
- Cedrick Lalara as Lindsey
- Morris Lalara as Jacko
- Peter Carroll as Michael Zeadler
- Athol Compton as Billy Corman
- Hedley Cullen as Judge
- Michael Duffield as Andrew Potter
- Wallas Eaton as Morgue Doctor
- Jo England as Babysitter
- John Frawley as Policeman

== Production ==
In an interview on the Criterion Collection DVD release, director Peter Weir explains that the film explores the question, "What if someone with a very pragmatic approach to life experienced a premonition?"

Finance was provided by the Australian Film Commission ($120,000), the South Australian Film Corporation ($120,000), Janus Films (US$50,000) and United Artists ($350,000). US based writer Petru Popescu worked on the script. Weir considered two Australian actors to play the lead but eventually decided to go with Richard Chamberlain. Filming started 24 February 1977 and took place in Adelaide and Sydney.

== Reception and accolades ==
The Last Wave was met with positive reviews from critics and audiences, earning a 78% approval rating on Rotten Tomatoes from 18 reviews. The film also holds an 85/100 on Metacritic.

The film was entered in the 6th Tehran International Film Festival in November 1977, and won the Golden Ibex prize.

Award	Category	Subject	Result
AACTA Awards (1977 AFI Awards)	Best Direction	Peter Weir	Nominated
AACTA Awards (1977 AFI Awards)	Best Original Screenplay	Peter Weir	Nominated
AACTA Awards (1977 AFI Awards)	Best Original Screenplay	Tony Morphett	Nominated
AACTA Awards (1977 AFI Awards)	Best Original Screenplay	Petru Popescu	Nominated
AACTA Awards (1977 AFI Awards)	Best Actor	Richard Chamberlain	Nominated
AACTA Awards (1977 AFI Awards)	Best Cinematography	Russell Boyd	Won
AACTA Awards (1977 AFI Awards)	Best Editing	Max Lemon	Nominated
AACTA Awards (1977 AFI Awards)	Best Original Music Score	Charles Wain	Nominated
AACTA Awards (1977 AFI Awards)	Best Sound	Greg Bell	Won
AACTA Awards (1977 AFI Awards)	Best Sound	Don Connolly	Won
AACTA Awards (1977 AFI Awards)	Best Sound	Phil Judd	Won

== Release ==
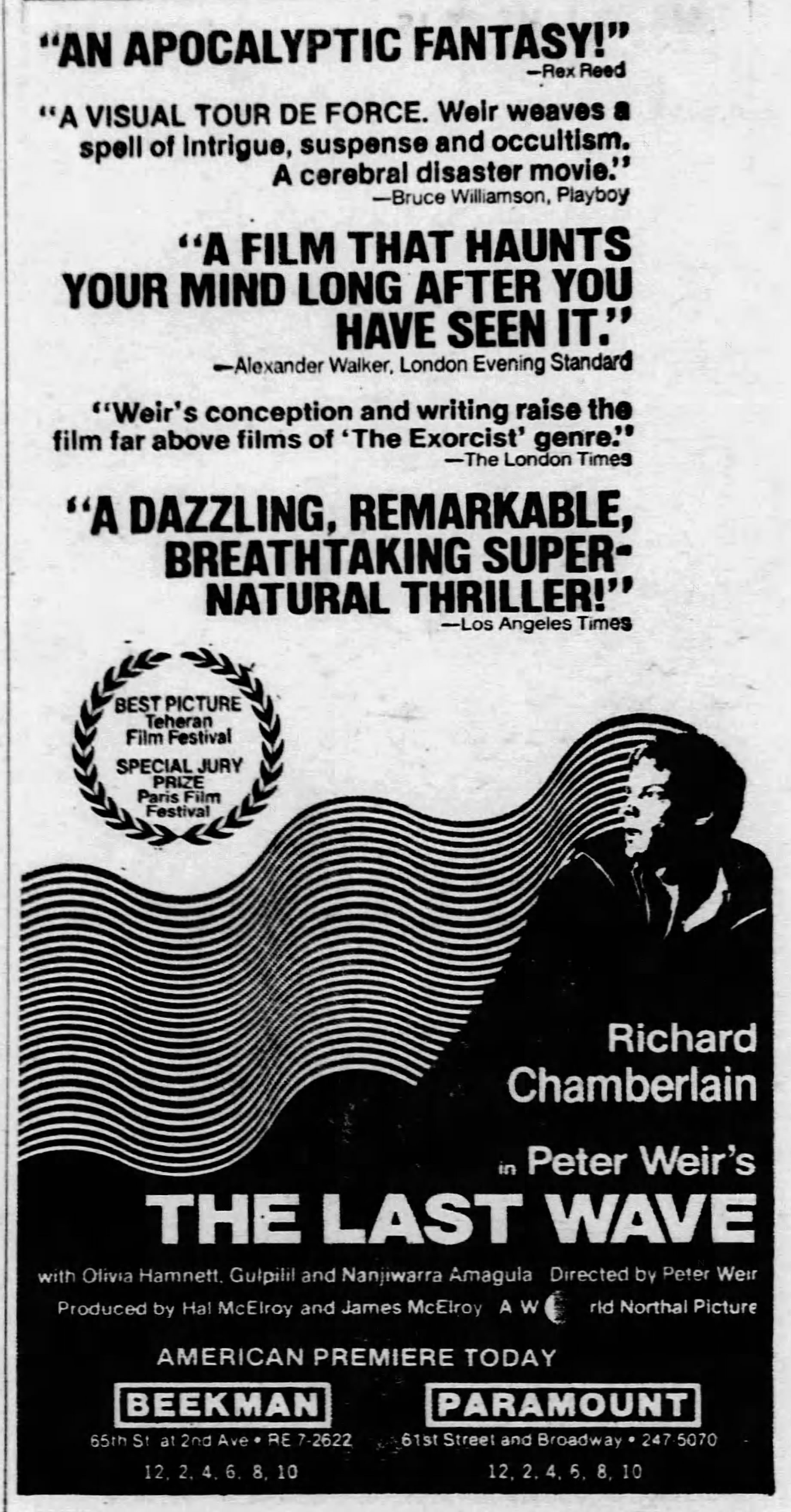
U.S. theatrical advertisement, 1978

=== Box office ===
The Last Wave was not as popular as Weir's 1975 film Picnic at Hanging Rock, but still grossed $1,258,000 at the box office in Australia.

United Artists decided not to release the film in the US but it was picked up by World Northal for U.S. distribution.

=== Home media ===
In the United States and Canada, The Last Wave was released on DVD by the Criterion Collection as spine #142 and is available on their bespoke streaming service, The Criterion Channel.

In Australia, The Last Wave was remastered and released onto DVD & Blu-ray by Umbrella Entertainment in September 2020 as the first film in the Sunburnt Screens collection. Umbrella later re-released the film onto 4K Blu-ray in September 2023.

== See also ==
- Cinema of Australia
- Dreamtime
- List of Australian films
- South Australian Film Corporation
- Kurdaitcha, a mystical executioner in Aboriginal culture
