= David Lee (Australian sound engineer) =

Australian sound engineer (born 1958)

- Born: 6 September 1958 (age 67)
- Occupation: Sound engineer
- Years active: 1981 – present

David Lee (born 6 September 1958) is an Australian sound engineer. He won an Oscar for Best Sound for the 1999 film The Matrix and was nominated for the same award for the 2014 film Unbroken. He has worked on over 35 films since 1981.

== Selected filmography ==
- The Matrix (1999)
- Unbroken (2014)

=== Academy Awards ===
Year	Category	Nominated work	Result	Ref.
1999	Best Sound	The Matrix	Won	
2014	Best Sound Mixing	Unbroken	Nominated	
2022	Best Sound	Elvis	Nominated	
