= Tara Webb =

Australian sound editor

- Occupation: Sound editor

Tara Webb is an Australian sound editor. She was nominated for an Academy Award in the category Best Sound for the film The Power of the Dog. She also served as a sound engineer for the film The Power of the Dog.

== Selected filmography ==
- The Power of the Dog (2021; co-nominated with Richard Flynn and Robert Mackenzie)
