= Guntis Sics =

Australian sound engineer

- Occupation: Sound engineer
- Years active: 1991 – present

Guntis Sics is an Australian sound engineer. He was nominated for an Academy Award in the category Best Sound for the film Moulin Rouge! He has worked on more than 25 films since 1992, including the 2013 adaptation of The Great Gatsby, starring Leonardo DiCaprio.

== Selected filmography ==
- Moulin Rouge! (2001)
- Australia (2008)
- The Great Gatsby (2013)
