= Phil Judd (sound engineer) =

Phil Judd (born 1948) is an Australian sound engineer, managing director of PhilmSound Pty. Ltd., who is credited with post-production work on many well-known (mostly Australian) movies and several television series. He is not related to the New Zealand musician Phil Judd.

== History ==
Judd began his audio engineering career in 1964 at the broadcast studios of 2GB in Sydney as a sound booth panel operator, then in 1967 joined Fauna Productions who were employing production crew for the television series Skippy the Bush Kangaroo, for which incidentally he provided the trademark "tch-tch" voice of "Skippy".

Around 1970 he joined Artransa Film Studios, for whom he mixed his first feature film, The Adventures of Barry McKenzie (1972); another notable film of this period of his life was Peter Weir's The Last Wave, for which he won an AFI award in 1977, after which his name was associated with a great number of Australian movies and TV mini-series. His name has been associated with Peter Weir on many projects.

In 1991 he founded his own company PhilmSound with extensive facilities at Lindfield, New South Wales.

== Some movie credits ==
- 1970 Nickel Queen
- 1973 The Cars That Ate Paris
- 1975 Caddie
- 1976 Dot and the Kangaroo
- 1977 The Long Weekend
- 1977 The Last Wave
- 1977 Solo
- 1978 Blue Fin
- 1979 The Little Convict
- 1979 Breaker Morant
- 1980 The Club
- 1981 We of the Never Never
- 1981 The Return of Captain Invincible
- 1982 Bush Christmas
- 1983 The Coolangatta Gold
- 1984 BMX Bandits
- 1985 Mad Max Beyond Thunderdome
- 1985 Fortress
- 1986 Crocodile Dundee
- 1987 The Year My Voice Broke
- 1987 Grievous Bodily Harm
- 1988 Dead Calm
- 1989 Dead Poets Society
- 1991 Green Card
- 1991 Flirting
- 1991 Black Robe
- 1992 Turtle Beach
- 1992 Strictly Ballroom
- 1992 Blinky Bill: The Mischievous Koala
- 1993 Reckless Kelly
- 1993 Fearless
- 1994 The Adventures of Priscilla, Queen of the Desert
- 1998 The Boys
- 1999 Siam Sunset
- 2000 The Wog Boy
- 2001 The Magic Pudding
- 2001 Mullet
- 2001 The Man Who Sued God
- 2002 Australian Rules
- 2005 Hating Alison Ashley
- 2006 Happy Feet
- 2007 Hey, Hey, It's Esther Blueburger

== Memberships ==
- Audio Engineering Society
- Motion Picture Sound Editors (US)
- Australian Film Institute (Pre-selection Judge)
- Australian Screen Sound Guild Inc. (and founding president)
