= Simon Duggan =

New Zealand-born Australian cinematographer

- Born: 13 May 1959 (age 67); Wellington, New Zealand
- Years active: 1998–present
- Organizations: Australian Cinematographers Society; American Society of Cinematographers

Simon Duggan, ASC, ACS (born May 13, 1959) is a New Zealand-Australian cinematographer.

== Career ==
Duggan started his career off in Australia at Ross Wood Film Studios.

He had worked in a number of big-budget features, including the ones directed by Alex Proyas and Len Wiseman. In addition, he was director of photography on Baz Luhrmann's The Great Gatsby, shot in 3D.

Duggan was invited as a member to the Australian Cinematographers Society in 1989, and American Society of Cinematographers in 2022.

== Filmography ==
Film

Year	Title	Director	Notes
1998	The Interview	Craig Monahan	
2001	Risk	Alan White	
2002	Garage Days	Alex Proyas	
2004	I, Robot	Alex Proyas	
2006	Underworld: Evolution	Len Wiseman	
2007	Live Free or Die Hard	Len Wiseman	
2008	The Mummy: Tomb of the Dragon Emperor	Rob Cohen	
2008	Restraint	David Denneen	
2009	Knowing	Alex Proyas	
2011	Killer Elite	Gary McKendry	
2013	The Great Gatsby	Baz Luhrmann	
2014	300: Rise of an Empire	Noam Murro	
2016	Warcraft	Duncan Jones	
2016	Hacksaw Ridge	Mel Gibson	
2017	The Lego Ninjago Movie	Charlie Bean; Paul Fisher; Bob Logan	Live-action scenes only
2019	Isn't It Romantic	Todd Strauss-Schulson	
2022	Disenchanted	Adam Shankman	
2024	Furiosa: A Mad Max Saga	George Miller	
2024	The Exorcism	Joshua John Miller	
2026	Practical Magic 2	Susanne Bier	
2027	Ally Clark †	Phillip Noyce	Post-production

Television

Year	Title	Director	Notes
2024	Territory	Greg McLean	6 episodes
2025	We Were Liars	Nzingha Stewart	Episode "Pilot"

== Awards and nominations ==
Year	Award	Category	Title	Result	Ref.
1998	AACTA Awards	Best Cinematography	The Interview	Nominated	
2013	AACTA Awards	Best Cinematography	The Great Gatsby	Won	
2016	AACTA Awards	Best Cinematography	Hacksaw Ridge	Won	
2016	Satellite Awards	Best Cinematography	Hacksaw Ridge	Nominated	
