= Andy Wright (sound engineer) =

Australian supervising sound editor

Andy "Frank" Wright is an Australian supervising sound editor. He is known for his work on the war-drama film Hacksaw Ridge directed by Mel Gibson, for which he received two Academy Award nominations at the 89th Academy Awards, Best Sound Editing and winning Best Sound Mixing (both shared with Robert Mackenzie).

== Awards ==
- Won: Academy Award for Best Sound Mixing
- Won: Satellite Award for Best Sound
- Nominated: Academy Award for Best Sound Editing
- Nominated: BAFTA Award for Best Sound
- Nominated: Cinema Audio Society Award for Outstanding Achievement in Sound Mixing for a Motion Picture – Live Action
