= Robert Mackenzie (sound engineer) =

Australian supervising sound editor

Robert Mackenzie is an Australian supervising sound editor.

He is best known for his work on Animal Kingdom (2010), The Hunter (2011), Lore (2012), Felony (2013), The Grandmaster (2013), The Rover (2014), Deadline Gallipoli (2015), Partisan (2015), Lion (2016), The Power of the Dog (2021), Furiosa: A Mad Max Saga (2024) and critically acclaimed war-drama film Hacksaw Ridge, for which he received two Academy Award nominations at the 89th Academy Awards, Best Sound Editing and Best Sound Mixing (both shared with Andy Wright).

== Awards ==
- Won: AACTA Award for Best Sound - Hacksaw Ridge
- Won: Academy Award for Best Sound Mixing - Hacksaw Ridge
- Won: Satellite Award for Best Sound - Hacksaw Ridge
- Won: AACTA Award for Best Sound - Lion
- Won: AACTA Award for Best Sound - Breath
- Won: AACTA Award for Best Sound - Furiosa: A Mad Max Saga
- Nominated CAS Award for Outstanding Achievement in Sound Mixing for a Motion Picture – Live Action
- Nominated: Academy Award for Best Sound Editing - Hacksaw Ridge
- Nominated: BAFTA Award for Best Sound - Hacksaw Ridge
- Nominated: Academy Award for Best Sound - The Power of the Dog
