= 15th AACTA Awards =

Australian film and television award ceremony

- Sponsored by: Foxtel
- Date: 4 February 2026 (industry luncheon); 6 February 2026 (main ceremony)
- Location: Home of the Arts, Gold Coast, Australia
- Hosted by: Celeste Barber

Highlights
- Most awards: Bring Her Back (10)
- Most nominations: Apple Cider Vinegar (20)
- Best Film: Bring Her Back
- Best Drama Series: The Newsreader
- Best Comedy Series: Bump

Television/radio coverage
- Networks
- Network 10; Showcase

The 15th Australian Academy of Cinema and Television Arts Awards (generally known as the AACTA Awards) is an awards ceremony to celebrate the best of Australian films and television of 2025. The main ceremony occurred on 6 February 2026 at the Home of the Arts on the Gold Coast and was broadcast on Network 10 and Showcase. The recipient of the Longford Lyell Award was director Bruce Beresford. The ceremony was preceded by an earlier industry gala on 4 February 2026.

== Feature film ==
The nominations are as follows:

Best Film: Bring Her Back – Samatha Jennings, Kristina Ceyton; Kangaroo – David Jowsey, Greer Simpkin, Angela Littlejohn, Rachel Clements, Trisha Morton-Thomas; Lesbian Space Princess – Tom Phillips; The Correspondent – Carmel Travers; The Surfer – Leonara Darby, James Harris, Robert Connolly, James Grandison, Brunella Cocchiglia, Nathan Klingher, Nicolas Cage; The Travellers – Michael Boughen, Matthew Street, Kelvin Munro	Best Indie Film: Lesbian Space Princess – Tom Phillips; Carmen & Bolude – Yolandi Franken, Michela Carattini; Fwends – Carter Looker, Sarah Hegge-Taylor, Sophie Somerville; It Will Find You – Helen Tuck, Enzo Tedeschi, Chris Broadbent; Magic Beach – Liz Kearney, Kate Laurie, Robert Connolly, Chloe Brugale; With or Without You – Su Armstrong, Carolyn Johnson
Best Direction: Danny and Michael Philippou – Bring Her Back; Kate Woods – Kangaroo; Emma Hough Hobbs, Leela Varghese – Lesbian Space Princess; Kriv Stenders – The Correspondent; Bruce Beresford – The Travellers	Best Screenplay: Peter Duncan – The Correspondent; Danny Philippou, Bill Hinzman – Bring Her Back; Charles Williams – Inside; Emma Hough Hobbs, Leela Varghese – Lesbian Space Princess; Michael Shanks – Together
Best Lead Actor: Richard Roxburgh – The Correspondent; Bryan Brown – The Travellers; Ryan Corr – Kangaroo; Jai Courtney – Dangerous Animals; Guy Pearce – Inside; David Wenham – Spit	Best Lead Actress: Sally Hawkins – Bring Her Back; Alison Brie – Together; Emily Browning – One More Shot; Susie Porter – The Travellers; Daisy Ridley – We Bury the Dead; Lily Whiteley – Kangaroo
Best Supporting Actor: Julian McMahon – The Surfer; Damon Herriman – Together; Cosmo Jarvis – Inside; Julian Maroun – The Correspondent; Rahel Romahn – The Correspondent; Jonah Wren Phillips – Bring Her Back	Best Supporting Actress: Deborah Mailman – Kangaroo; Marta Dusseldorp – With or Without You; Brooke Satchwell – Kangaroo; Yael Stone – The Correspondent; Sally-Anne Upton – Bring Her Back; Sora Wong – Bring Her Back
Best Cinematography: Aaron McLisky – Bring Her Back; Mark Wareham – Beast of War; Geoffrey Hall – The Correspondent; Radek Ladczuk – The Surfer; Tyson Perkins – Went Up the Hill	Best Editing: Geoff Lamb – Bring Her Back; Stephen Evans, Kiah Roache Turner, Regg Skwarko – Beast of War; Veronika Jenet – The Correspondent; Tony Cranstoun – The Surfer; Sean Lahiff – Together
Best Original Music Score: Cornel Wilczek – Bring Her Back; Michael Darren – Lesbian Space Princess; Tom Ellard – The Correspondent; Francois Tetaz – The Surfer; Cornel Wilczek – Together	Best Sound: Emma Bortignon, Nick Steele, Hamish Keen, Cameron Grant, Lachlan Harris, Pete Smith – Bring Her Back; Liam Egan, Angus Robertson, Lara Cross, Michael Newton, Derryn Pasquill, Adrian Medhurst – The Correspondent; Stuart Morton, Joshua O'Donnell, Diego Ruiz – Spit; Paul Pirola, Matt Lapthorne – Together; Chris Hiles, Justin Spaveski, Leah Katz, Robert McKenzie – Went Up the Hill
Best Production Design: Fiona Donovan – The Correspondent; Emma Hough Hobbs – Lesbian Space Princess; Emma Fletcher – The Surfer; Nicholas Dare – Went Up the Hill; Sherree Philips – Together	Best Costume Design: Anna Cahill – Bring Her Back; Tracey Rose Sparke – Beast of War; Phill Eagles – Spit; Joanna Mae Park – The Correspondent; Lien See Leong – The Surfer
Best Casting: Nikki Barrett – Bring Her Back; Nikki Barrett, Natalie Wall – Inside; Anousha Zarkesh – Kangaroo; Anousha Zarkesh – The Correspondent; Jane Norris – The Surfer

== Television ==
Best Drama Series: The Newsreader – Joanna Werner, Michael Lucas (ABC); Bay of Fires – Marta Dusseldorp, Fiona McConaghy (ABC); Black Snow: Jack of Clubs – Rosemary Blight, Milly Olrog, Lucas Taylor, Ben Grant (Stan); Mystery Road: Origin – Greer Simpkin, David Jowsey (ABC); The Family Next Door – Melinda Wearne, Dean O'Toole, David Ogilvy, Jenny O'Shea (ABC); The Twelve: Cape Rock Killer – Hamish Lewis, Michael Brooks, Ally Henville, Ian Collie, Rob Gibson (Binge, Foxtel)	Best Miniseries: Apple Cider Vinegar – Samantha Strauss, Liz Watts, Louise Gough, Helen Gregory, Emile Sherman, Iain Canning (Netflix); Invisible Boys – Nicholas Verso, Tania Chambers (Stan); Mix Tape – Angie Fielder, Polly Staniford, Aoife O'Sullivan, Tristan Orpen Lynch (Binge, Foxtel); The Last Anniversary – Nicole Kidman, Per Saari, Steve Hutensky, Jodi Matterson, Samantha Strauss, John Polson (Binge, Foxtel); The Narrow Road to the Deep North – Jo Porter, Rachel Gardner, Shaun Grant, Justin Kurzel, Alexandra Taussig (Amazon Prime Video); The Survivors – Tony Ayres, Andrea Denholm, Cherie Nowlan, Andrew Walker (Netflix)
Best Narrative Comedy Series: Bump – Dan Edwards, John Edwards, Claudia Karvan, Kelsey Munro (Stan); Austin – Joe Weatherstone, Catherine Nebauer (ABC); Ghosts – Kylie Washington, Sophia Zachariou, Bree-Anne Sykes, Joshua Mapleston (Network 10, Paramount+); Mother and Son – Jude Troy, Richard Finlayson, Alexandra Cameron, Matt Okine (ABC); Strife – Steve Hutensky, Katie Amos, Asher Keddie, Mia Freedman, Sarah Scheller, Lorelle Adamson (Binge, Foxtel); Top End Bub – Rosemary Blight, Ben Grant, Joshua Tyler, Miranda Tapsell (Amazon Prime Video)	Best Entertainment Program: Portrait Artist of the Year – David McDonald, Kate Feely, Maria Handas (ABC); Dancing with the Stars – Peter Beck, Amanda Bainbridge, Deb Spinocchia, Kylie Washington (Seven Network); Eurovision Song Contest 2025 Grand Final: Access All Areas – Paul Clarke, Emily Griggs, Angela Downing (SBS); I'm A Celebrity...Get Me Out Of Here! – Beth Hart, Alex Mavroidakis, Josie Steele, Jaala Webster, Clare Bath (Network 10); Lego Masters: Grand Masters of the Galaxy – David McDonald, Hamish Blake, Di Yang, AJ Johnson (Nine Network); That Blackfella Show – Rowdie Walden (ABC)
Best Comedy Entertainment Program: Hard Quiz – Chris Walker, Kevin Whyte, Tom Gleeson, John Tabbagh (ABC); Guy Montgomery's Guy-Mont Spelling Bee – Bronwynn Bakker, Cameron Bakker, Guy Montgomery, Greg Sitch (ABC); Sam Pang Tonight – Sam Pang, John Origlasso (Network 10); Spicks and Specks – Rowdie Walden, Anthony Watt (ABC); Taskmaster Australia – Bronwynn Bakker, Cameron Bakker (Paramount+); The Weekly with Charlie Pickering – Charlie Pickering, Chris Walker, Kevin Whyte, Frank Bruzzese (ABC)	Best Factual Entertainment Program: Alone Australia – Beth Hart, Riima Daher, Joseph McMahon, Keely Sonntag (SBS); Gogglebox Australia – David McDonald, Will Minchin, Natasha Pizzica (Network 10); Muster Dogs: Collies and Kelpies – Michael Boughen, Matthew Street, Lauren Rudd (ABC); Take 5 with Zan Rowe – Zan Rowe, Nikita Agzarian, Josh Schmidt (ABC); The Piano – Bethan Briegel-Jones, Gemma Murphy, Josie Mason Campbell (ABC); The Secret DNA of Us – Josie Mason Campbell, Sophie Meyrick (SBS)
Best Lifestyle Program: Grand Designs Australia – Brooke Bayvel, Michael Collett (ABC); Gardening Australia – Gill Lomas (ABC); Love It or List It Australia – Karen Warner, Geoff Fitzpatrick, John Luscombe, Howard Myers-Rifai (Binge, Foxtel); Restoration Australia – Brooke Bayvel, Michael Collett (ABC); Selling Houses Australia – Caroline Swift, Kam Vurlow, Monique Bushby (Binge, Foxtel); The Cook Up with Adam Liaw – Emily Griggs, Gavin Jarrett (SBS)	Best Reality Program: The Great Australian Bake Off – Emily Commens, Amanda Bainbridge, Deb Spinocchia, Kylie Washington (Binge, Foxtel); Australian Idol – Joel McCormack, Riccy Felixberto, Wes Dening (Seven Network); Australian Survivor: Australia V The World – Amelia Fisk, David Forster, Phoebe McMahon, Toby Trappel (Network 10); Married At First Sight – Tara McWilliams, Alexandra Spurway, Stevo Petkovic, Dimi Theodoulou (Nine Network); MasterChef Australia – Marty Benson, Adam Fergusson, Eoin Maher, April Mackay (Network 10); The Amazing Race Australia – Rikkie Proost, Alenka Henry, Jane Rowley (Network 10)
Best Children's Program: Play School: All Together – Bryson Hall, Lyndal Mebberson (ABC); Do Not Watch This Show – Andy Lee, Greg Sitch (ABC); Hard Quiz Kids – Chris Walker, Kevin Whyte, Tom Gleeson, John Tabbagh (ABC); Space Nova – Suzanne Ryan, Yasmin Jones (ABC)	Best Stand-Up Special: I'm As Surprised As You Are – Celia Pacquola – Kevin Whyte; The Magical Dead Cat – Aunty Donna – Jessica Galea, Georgia Mappin, Tom Downey; So Proud – Claire Hooper – Kyran Nicholson; Don't Tease Me About My Gloves – Geraldine Hickey – Kevin Whyte; Melbourne International Comedy Festival - The Allstars Supershow – Rowdie Walden, Susan Provan; Melbourne International Comedy Festival - The Gala – Rowdie Walden, Susan Provan
Best Lead Actor in Drama: Jacob Elordi – The Narrow Road to the Deep North; Mark Coles Smith – Mystery Road: Origin; Travis Fimmel – Black Snow: Jack of Clubs; Sam Neill – The Twelve: Cape Rock Killer; Hunter Page-Lochard – Reckless; Sam Reid – The Newsreader	Best Lead Actress in Drama: Anna Torv – The Newsreader; Alycia Debnam-Carey – Apple Cider Vinegar; Aisha Dee – Watching You; Kaitlyn Dever – Apple Cider Vinegar; Tuuli Narkle – Mystery Road: Origin; Teresa Palmer – Mix Tape
Best Supporting Actor in Drama: Daniel Henshall – The Newsreader; Luke Carroll – Mystery Road: Origin; Mark Coles Smith – Apple Cider Vinegar; Daniel Henshall – The Family Next Door; Matt Nable – Apple Cider Vinegar; Ashley Zukerman – Apple Cider Vinegar	Best Supporting Actress in Drama: Heather Mitchell – The Narrow Road to the Deep North; Essie Davis – Apple Cider Vinegar; Aisha Dee – Apple Cider Vinegar; Michelle Lim Davidson – The Newsreader; Robyn Malcolm – Mystery Road: Origin; Susie Porter – Apple Cider Vinegar
Best Comedy Performer: Tom Gleeson – Hard Quiz; Hamish Blake – Lego Masters: Grand Masters of the Galaxy; Melanie Bracewell – The Cheap Seats; Aaron Chen – Guy Montgomery's Guy-Mont Spelling Bee; Luke McGregor – Portrait Artist of the Year; Guy Montgomery – Guy Montgomery's Guy-Mont Spelling Bee; Sam Pang – Sam Pang Tonight; Julia Zemiro – Crime Night!	Best Acting in a Comedy: Miranda Tapsell – Top End Bub; Claudia Karvan – Bump; Asher Keddie – Strife; Ben Miller – Austin; Sally Phillips – Austin; Angus Sampson – Bump; Denise Scott – Mother and Son; Michael Theo – Austin
Best Direction in Drama or Comedy: Justin Kurzel – The Narrow Road to the Deep North – Episode 1; Jeffrey Walker – Apple Cider Vinegar – Episode 5: Casseroles; Lucy Gaffy – Mix Tape – Episode 1; Emma Freeman – The Newsreader – Episode 3: Behind the Front Line; Madeleine Gottlieb – The Twelve: Cape Rock Killer – Episode 1	Best Direction in Non-Fiction Television: Ben Lawrence – The People vs Robodebt – Episode 2; Max Miller, Sam Lingham – Aunty Donna: The Magical Dead Cat; Richard Franc, Mark McEvilly – Australian Survivor: Australia V The World – Episode 1: The Multiverse; Kirk Docker – I Was Actually There – Episode 4: Cronulla Riots; Nick Robinson – The Kimberley – Episode 1
Best Screenplay in Television: Michael Lucas – The Newsreader – Episode 6: The Fall; Angela Betzien – Apple Cider Vinegar – Episode 5: Casseroles; Samantha Strauss – Apple Cider Vinegar – Episode 6: Tapeworm; Jo Spain – Mix Tape – Episode 1; Sarah L. Walker – The Twelve: Cape Rock Killer – Episode 1	Best Casting: Kirsty McGregor – Apple Cider Vinegar; Anousha Zarkesh – Mystery Road Origin; Nikki Barrett, Kelly Graham – The Narrow Road to the Deep North; Nathan Lloyd – The Newsreader; Jane Norris – The Survivors
Best Cinematography in Television: Sam Chiplin – The Narrow Road to the Deep North – Episode 1; Toby Oliver – Apple Cider Vinegar – Episode 5: Casseroles; Sky Davies – Mystery Road: Origin – Episode 5; Earle Dresner – The Newsreader – Episode 3: Behind the Front Line; Mark Wareham – The Survivors – Episode 3	Best Costume Design in Television: Alice Babidge – The Narrow Road to the Deep North – Episode 1; Cappi Ireland – Apple Cider Vinegar – Episode 5: Casseroles; Joanna Mae Park, Suzanne Keogh – Mix Tape – Episode 1; Lien See Leong – The Survivors – Episode 3; Gypsy Taylor – The Newsreader – Episode 3: Behind the Front Line
Best Editing in Television: Alexandre de Franceschi – The Narrow Road to the Deep North – Episode 1; Mat Evans, Annette Davey – Apple Cider Vinegar – Episode 5: Casseroles; Peter Pritchard – Invisible Boys – Episode 9: Bees; Nicholas Holmes – Mystery Road: Origin – Episode 5; Julie-Anne De Ruvo – The Newsreader – Episode 6	Best Production Design in Television: Alice Babidge, Bev Dunn, Paul Sarpi – The Narrow Road to the Deep North – Episode 1; Melinda Doring – Apple Cider Vinegar – Episode 5: Casseroles; Herbert Pinter – Mystery Road: Origin – Episode 5; Scott Bird – Ten Pound Poms – Episode 1; Paddy Reardon – The Newsreader – Episode 3: Behind the Front Line
Best Original Music Score in Television: Jed Kurzel – The Narrow Road to the Deep North – Episode 1; Cornel Wilczek – Apple Cider Vinegar – Episode 5: Casseroles; Chiara Costanza – Mix Tape – Episode 1; Vincent Goodyer – Mystery Road: Origin – Episode 5; Thomas Rouch, Cornel Wilczek – The Survivors – Episode 3	Best Sound in Television: Andy Wright, Mick Boraso, Nick Emond, Glenn Newnham – The Narrow Road to the Deep North – Episode 1; Luke Mynott, Tania Vlassova, Cihan Saral, Michael Newton, Nick Godkin, Evan McHugh – Apple Cider Vinegar – Episode 5: Casseroles; Stuart Morton, Jonathan Mendolicchio, Lara Cross, Daniel Birch – Mix Tape – Episode 1; Emma Bortignon, Stephen Witherow, Tobi Armbruster – The Survivors – Episode 6; Trevor Hope, Dino Giacomin, Rob Sullivan, James Andrews – The Twelve: Cape Rock Killer – Episode 1

== Documentary ==
Best Documentary: Journey Home, David Gulpilil – Maggie Miles, Trisha Morton-Thomas, Rachel Clements, Jida Gulpilil, Lloyd Garrawurra; Ellis Park – Justin Kurzel, Nick Batzias, Charlotte Wheaton; Not Only Fred Dagg But Also John Clarke – Lorin Clarke, Richard Keddie; Songs Inside – Shalom Almond, Katrina Lucas; Unbreakable: The Jelena Dokic Story – Ivan O'Mahoney, Jessica Halloran; Yurlu | Country – Yaara Bou Melhem	Best Documentary or Factual Television Program: The People vs Robodebt – Paula Bycroft, Michael Cordell, Andrew Farrell (SBS); End Game with Tony Armstrong – Steve Bibb, Dan Brown, Dean Gibson (ABC); I Was Actually There – Loni Cooper, Josh Schmidt, Julie Hanna (ABC); The Assembly – Melissa Maclean, Mark Fennessy, Therese Hegarty, Julie Hanna (ABC); The Kimberley – Electra Manikakis, Nick Robinson, Peta Ayers, Mark Coles Smith (ABC); Who Do You Think You Are? – Maxine Gray, Carolyn Kung (SBS)
Best Editing in a Documentary: Peter Crombie – Unbreakable: The Jelena Dokic Story; Nick Fenton – Ellis Park; Aleck Morton – Not Only Fred Dagg But Also John Clarke; Gretchen Peterson – The People vs Robodebt – Episode 2; Katharina Fiedler – The Wolves Always Come at Night	Best Cinematography in a Documentary: Jack Riley, Nick Robinson, Caspar Mazzotti, Paul Bell – The Kimberley – Episode 1; Germain McMicking – Ellis Park; Allan Collins, Anna Cadden, Maggie Miles – Journey Home, David Gulpilil; Michael Latham – The Wolves Always Come at Night; Tom Bannigan – Yurlu | Country
Best Original Music Score in a Documentary: David Bridie – Journey Home, David Gulpilil; Simon Walbrook – Revealed: Death Cap Murders – Episode 1: The Crime; Amanda Brown – Songs Inside; Helena Czajka – Unbreakable: The Jelena Dokic Story; Helena Czajka – Yurlu | Country	Best Sound in a Documentary: Sam Hayward, Cameron Grant, Lauren Ligovich, Stuart Melvey – Yurlu | Country; Kevin Shirley, Travis Handley, Stephen Hopes – Cold Chisel: The Big 5-0; David Williams, Josh Williams, Owen Grieve – Journey Home, David Gulpilil; Tom Heuzenroeder – Songs Inside; Nigel Christensen, Michael Ackroyd, James Andrews – Unbreakable: The Jelena Dokic Story

== Short form and online ==
Best Short Film: I'm The Most Racist Person I Know – Leela Varghese, Suriyna Sivashanker, Shabana Azeez; Beyond Measure – David Ferrier; Dependent – Julian Maroun, Marcus Fredrick Khoudair, Joseph Chebatte, Emma Elias; DIY – Tony Gardiner, Lachlan Marks; Don't Ignore Me – Raymond Mendez, Charli Fletcher, Rosangela Fasano, Bianca Kean; Red River Cowboy – Grace Wriggles; The Shirt Off Your Back – Julia Corcoran, Ari Harrison, David Robinson-Smith; Writers in Love – Sarah Giles, Grace Malouf, Jacqueline Kerwick	Best Short Animation
Best Online Drama or Comedy: A Series of Unfortunate Dates – Amy Raffe; 'Til You Make It – Philip Hayden, Emma Choy, Scott Major, Riley Sugars, Gemma Louise Murphy; Long Head – Millie Holten, Annabelle Ots, Dan Ilic; Not Russian Anywhere – Annisa Belonogoff, Aimée-Lee Xu Hsien, Lucinda Bruce, Nicole Scharf; Ruff & Ruby – Jessica Trinity Fisher; The Worst That Could Happen – Lachlan Macfarlane, Austin Macfarlane, Rita Artmann, Monique Mulcahy

== Additional awards ==
Best Hair and Makeup: Rebecca Buratto, Larry Van Duynhoven, Paul Katte, Nick Nicolaou, Karen Gower, Mariel McClorey – Bring Her Back; Amber Adams, Adam Johansen, Damian Martin – It Will Find You; Angela Conte, Rachel Murphy, Rachel Scane, Laurence Van Duynhoven – The Narrow Road to the Deep North; Larry Van Duynhoven, Ellie Daniel, Brydie Stone, Julian Dimase – Together; Hayley Atherton, Jason Baird, Sean Genders – We Bury the Dead	Best Visual Effects or Animation: Jeff Capogreco, Alex Popescu, Jhon Alvarado, Tomasz Wachnik, Kacy McDonald – Tron: Ares; Glenn Melenhorst, Dom Hellier, Nathan Ortiz, Nicholas Tripodi, Teresa Mathew – How to Train Your Dragon; Michael Ralla, James Alexander, Rachel Copp, Guido Wolter, Donnie Dean – Sinners; David Dally, Ilona Blyth, Matt Middleton, Stephen King, Nicolas Caillier – Superman; Genevieve Camilleri, Larry Van Duynhoven, Josh Simmonds, Jeremy Pronk, Steve Oakley – Together
Best Original Song: "Here I Go" (Leela Varghese, Gemma Chua-Tran, Michael Darren) – Lesbian Space Princess; "Dangerous" (Ryan Bingham) – Dangerous Animals; "Head South" (Jonathan Ogilvie, Stella Bennett, Michael Daly, Grant Horsnell) – Head South; "Night & Day" (Dominic Cabusi, Bronte Maree O'Neill, Herana, Steady Okurame) – Carmen & Bolude; "The Chase" (Elliott Wheeler, Shannon Sanders) – Spit; "Went Up the Hill" (Vicky Krieps) – Went Up the Hill	Best Soundtrack: Mix Tape – Rory McPartland, Dina Coughlan; Apple Cider Vinegar – Jemma Burns; Bring Her Back – Andrew Koťátko; Kangaroo – Jemma Burns; Mystery Road: Origin – Jemma Burns; Playing Gracie Darling – Julia Webster, Jamie Richter
Audience Choice Award for Favourite Film: Wicked: For Good; How to Train Your Dragon; KPop Demon Hunters; Lilo & Stitch; Regretting You; Sinners	Audience Choice Award for Favourite Television Show: Stranger Things; Adolescence; Ginny & Georgia; The Pitt; The Summer I Turned Pretty; Wednesday
Audience Choice Award for Favourite Australian Actor: Jacob Elordi; Chris Hemsworth; Dacre Montgomery; Hugh Jackman; Joseph Zada; Sam Reid	Audience Choice Award for Favourite Australian Actress: Margot Robbie; Isla Fisher; Phoebe Tonkin; Rebel Wilson; Rose Byrne; Sarah Snook
Audience Choice Award for Favourite Australian Media Personality: Robert Irwin; Abbie Chatfield; Celeste Barber; Chris Brown; Hamish Blake; Sophie Monk	Audience Choice Award for Favourite Australian Digital Creator: Bridey Drake; Abbie Chatfield; Deja Clark; Jiny Maeng; Luke and Sassy Scott; Mekonnen Knife; Olly Bowman; SophaDopha
Audience Choice Award for Breakthrough Artist: Mekonnen Knife; Felix Mallard; Joseph Zada; Josh Heuston; Maia Mitchell; Milly Alcock; Odessa Young; Samara Weaving	Audience Choice Award for Favourite Australian Podcast: Shameless; Australian True Crime; Big Small Talk; Hamish & Andy; Hear Me Out; Life Uncut; She's On the Money; Toni and Ryan
Audience Choice Award for Favourite Australian Music Video: "A Cold Play" – The Kid Laroi; "Boyband" – 5 Seconds of Summer; "Dancing2" – Keli Holiday; "Dracula" – Tame Impala; "She Don't Need to Know" – The Kid Laroi; "Fascination in the Dark" – Vance Joy	Audience Choice Award for Favourite Australian Online Channel: The Norris Nuts; Aunty Donna; Chloe Ting; Dr. Esmé Louise James; How Ridiculous; HowToBasic; LazarBeam; Tom Harris
