= 14th AACTA Awards =

Australian film and television award ceremony

- Sponsored by: Foxtel
- Date: 5 February 2025 (industry luncheon); 7 February 2025 (main ceremony)
- Location: Home of the Arts, Gold Coast, Queensland
- Hosted by: Russell Crowe

Highlights
- Most nominations: Boy Swallows Universe (22)
- Best Film: Better Man
- Best Drama Series: Heartbreak High
- Best Comedy Series: Fisk

Television/radio coverage
- Networks
- Famous; Network 10

The 14th Australian Academy of Cinema and Television Arts Awards (generally known as the AACTA Awards) is an awards ceremony to celebrate the best of Australian films and television of 2024. The main ceremony occurred on 7 February 2025 at the Home of the Arts on the Gold Coast and was broadcast on Network 10 and Arena. The recipient of the Longford Lyell Award was film and television production company Working Dog Productions. The ceremony was preceded by an earlier industry luncheon on 5 February 2025.

== Feature film ==
The nominations are as follows:

Best Film: Better Man – Paul Currie, Michael Gracey, Coco Xiaolu Ma, Craig McMahon; Furiosa: A Mad Max Saga – Doug Mitchell, George Miller; How to Make Gravy – Schuyler Weiss, Hamish Lewis, Nick Waterman, Meg Washington, Michael Brooks; Late Night with the Devil – Mathew Govoni, Adam White; Memoir of a Snail – Liz Kearney, Adam Elliot; Runt – Jamie Hilton, Craig Silvey	Best Indie Film: Birdeater – Jack Clark, Jim Weir, Ulysses Oliver, Stephanie Troost; Before Dawn – Jordon Prince-Wright, Ian Hale; Christmess – Heath Davis, Daniel Fenech, Cindy Pritchard, Rick Beecroft, Jonathan Page; Just A Farmer – Simon Lyndon, Leila McDougall, Sean McDougall; The Emu War – John Campbell, Lisa Fineberg, Jay Morrissey; You'll Never Find Me – Indianna Bell, Josiah Allen, Christine Williams, Jordan Cowan
Best Direction: Michael Gracey — Better Man; George Miller — Furiosa: A Mad Max Saga; Nick Waterman — How to Make Gravy; Colin Cairnes, Cameron Cairnes — Late Night with the Devil; Adam Elliot — Memoir of a Snail	Best Screenplay in Film: Simon Gleeson, Oliver Cole, Michael Gracey – Better Man; George Miller, Nico Lathouris – Furiosa: A Mad Max Saga; Meg Washington, Nick Waterman – How to Make Gravy; Colin Cairnes, Cameron Cairnes – Late Night with the Devil; Adam Elliot – Memoir of a Snail
Best Lead Actor: Jonno Davies — Better Man; Eric Bana — Force of Nature: The Dry 2; David Dastmalchian — Late Night with the Devil; Daniel Henshall — How to Make Gravy; Guy Pearce — The Convert; Kodi Smit-McPhee — Memoir of a Snail	Best Lead Actress: Sarah Snook — Memoir of a Snail; Laura Gordon — Late Night with the Devil; Jackie van Beek — Audrey; Anya Taylor-Joy — Furiosa: A Mad Max Saga; Anna Torv — Force of Nature: The Dry 2; Phoebe Tonkin — Kid Snow
Best Supporting Actor: Damon Herriman – Better Man; Fayssal Bazzi – Late Night with the Devil; Chris Hemsworth – Furiosa: A Mad Max Saga; Damon Herriman – How to Make Gravy; Richard Roxburgh – Force Of Nature: The Dry 2; Hugo Weaving – How to Make Gravy	Best Supporting Actress: Jacki Weaver – Memoir of a Snail; Alyla Browne – Furiosa: A Mad Max Saga; Hannah Diviney – Audrey; Kate Mulvany – Better Man; Kate Mulvany – How to Make Gravy; Ingrid Torelli – Late Night with the Devil
Best Cinematography: Simon Duggan – Furiosa: A Mad Max Saga; Erik A. Wilson, Matt Toll, Ashley Wallen – Better Man; Andrew Commis – Force of Nature: The Dry 2; Matthew Temple – Late Night with the Devil; Gerald Thompson – Memoir of a Snail	Best Editing: Martin Connor, Lee Smith, Spencer Susser, Jeff Groth, Patrick Correll – Better Man; Alexandre de Franceschi, Maria Papoutsis – Force of Nature: The Dry 2; Eliot Knapman, Margaret Sixel – Furiosa: A Mad Max Saga; Cameron Cairnes, Colin Cairnes – Late Night with the Devil; Bill Murphy – Memoir of a Snail
Best Original Music Score: Batu Sener – Better Man; Tom Holkenborg – Furiosa: A Mad Max Saga; Sam Dixon – How to Make Gravy; Roscoe James Irwin, Glenn Richards – Late Night with the Devil; Elena Kats-Chernin – Memoir of a Snail	Best Sound: Robert Mackenzie, Ben Osmo, James Ashton, Yulia Akerholt, Jessica Meier, Tom Holkenborg – Furiosa: A Mad Max Saga; Paul Pirola, Guntis Sics, Greg P. Russell, Tom Marks, Andy Nelson – Better Man; Craig Walmsley, Stuart Morton, Diego Ruiz, Sam Hayward – How to Make Gravy; Emma Bortignon, Manel Lopez, Pete Smith, Cameron Grant – Late Night with the Devil; David Williams, Andy Wright, Lee Yee, Dylan Burgess – Memoir of a Snail
Best Production Design: Colin Gibson, Katie Sharrock – Furiosa: A Mad Max Saga; Joel Chang – Better Man; Benjamin Fountain, Peter Kodicek – How to Make Gravy; Otello Stolfo – Late Night with the Devil; Adam Elliot – Memoir of a Snail	Best Costume Design: Jenny Beavan – Furiosa: A Mad Max Saga; Cappi Ireland – Better Man; Christina Validakis – How to Make Gravy; Steph Hooke – Late Night with the Devil; Terri Lamera – Runt
Best Casting: Alison Telford, Kate Leonard, Kate Dowd – Better Man; Nikki Barrett – Furiosa: A Mad Max Saga; Nikki Barrett – How to Make Gravy; Leigh Pickford – Late Night with the Devil; Kirsty McGregor, Annie Murtagh-Monks – Runt

== Television ==
Best Drama Series: Heartbreak High – Carly Heaton, Sarah Freeman, Hannah Carroll Chapman (Netflix); Fake – Imogen Banks, Emelyne Palmer, Asher Keddie (Paramount+); The Artful Dodger – Jo Porter, David Maher, David Taylor (Disney+); The Twelve – Hamish Lewis, Michael Brooks, Ally Henville, Ian Collie, Rob Gibson (Binge, Foxtel); Thou Shalt Not Steal – Dylan River, Tanith Glynn-Maloney, Charlie Aspinwall, Daley Pearson, Sam Moor (Stan); Total Control – Darren Dale, Rachel Griffiths, Stuart Page, Erin Bretherton (ABC)	Best Miniseries: Boy Swallows Universe – Andrew Mason, Troy Lum (Netflix); Exposure – Nicole O'Donohue, Justin Kurzel, Shaun Grant (Stan); Four Years Later – Ian Collie, Stephen Corvini, Rob Gibson (SBS); House of Gods – Sheila Jayadev, Deborah Lee, Bree-Anne Sykes, Blake Ayshford (ABC); Human Error – John Edwards, Dan Edwards, Samantha Winston, Greg Haddrick (Nine Network); Last Days of the Space Age – Laura Waters, Emma Fitzsimons, Chris Loveall, Stephanie Swedlove (Disney+)
Best Narrative Comedy Series: Fisk – Nicole Minchin, Kitty Flanagan, Vincent Sheehan, Tom Peterson (ABC); Austin – Catherine Nebauer, Joe Weatherstone, Darren Ashton, Ben Miller (ABC); Bump – Dan Edwards, John Edwards, Claudia Karvan, Kelsey Munro (Stan); Colin from Accounts – Kevin Greene, Ian Collie, Rob Gibson (Binge, Foxtel); Strife – Steve Hutensky, Jodi Matterson, Asher Keddie, Mia Freedman, Sarah Scheller, Lorelle Adamson (Binge, Foxtel); The Office – Sophia Zachariou, Kylie Washington, Linda Micsko (Amazon Prime Video)	Best Entertainment Program: Spicks and Specks – Rowdie Walden, Michiko Smith, Anthony Watt (ABC); Dancing with the Stars – Peter Beck, Deb Spinocchia, Kylie Washington (Seven Network); Lego Masters: Australia vs The World – David McDonald, AJ Johnson, Di Yang (Nine Network); Mastermind – Lucy De Luca, Kylie Washington, Deb Spinocchia (SBS); The 1% Club – John Leahy, Michiko Smith, Kylie Washington, Deb Spinocchia (Seven Network); Tipping Point – Amelia Fisk, Becky Taylor, Miles Reeves, Roslyn Saunders (Nine Network)
Best Comedy Entertainment Program: Hard Quiz – Chris Walker, Kevin Whyte, Tom Gleeson, John Tabbagh (ABC); Guy Montgomery's Guy Mont-Spelling Bee – Cam Bakker, Bronwynn Bakker, Greg Sitch (ABC); Have You Been Paying Attention? – Michael Hirsh, Rob Sitch, Deb Herman (Network 10); Thank God You're Here – Michael Hirsh, Deb Herman, Rob Sitch (Network 10); The Cheap Seats – Michael Hirsh, Deb Herman, Rob Sitch (Network 10); The Weekly with Charlie Pickering – Chris Walker, Charlie Pickering, Kevin Whyte, Frank Bruzzese (ABC)	Best Factual Entertainment Program: Muster Dogs – Monica O'Brien, Michael Boughen, John Unwin, Matthew Street, Jo Chichester, Rachel Robinson (ABC); Alone Australia – Riima Daher, Beth Hart, Keely Sonntag (SBS); Gogglebox Australia – David McDonald, Will Minchin, Natasha Pizzica (Foxtel, Network 10); Stuff the British Stole – Marc Fennell, Alan Erson, Richard Finlayson, Kate Pappas (ABC); Take 5 with Zan Rowe – Zan Rowe, Nikita Agzarian, Josh Schmidt (ABC); The Assembly – Mark Fennessy, Therese Hegarty, Julie Hanna, Vanessa Oxlad (ABC)
Best Lifestyle Program: Grand Designs Australia – Brooke Bayvel, Michael Collett (ABC); Dogs Behaving (Very) Badly Australia – Naomi Elkin, Sarah Thornton, Helen Biggs, Leisa Pratt (Network 10); Gardening Australia – Gill Lomas (ABC); Grand Designs Transformations – Brooke Bayvel, Michael Collett (ABC); Restoration Australia – Brooke Bayvel, Michael Collett (ABC); Selling Houses Australia – Kam Vurlow, Monique Bushby (Foxtel)	Best Reality Series: MasterChef Australia – Marty Benson, Simon Child, Eoin Maher, April Mackay (Network 10); Australian Idol – Joel McCormack, Wes Dening, Rikkie Proost (Seven Network); Australian Survivor: Titans V Rebels – Amelia Fisk, David Forster, Toby Trappel, Phoebe McMahon (Network 10); Shark Tank – Cat Bowden, Ben Ulm, Jemma Carlton (Network 10); The Amazing Race Australia – Jane Rowley, Rikkie Proost, Lucy Connors, Emma Hanna (Network 10); The Great Australian Bake Off – Alenka Henry, Sophie Johnston, Kylie Washington, Deb Spinocchia (Foxtel)
Best Children's Series: Bluey – Joe Brumm, Charlie Aspinwall, Daley Pearson, Sam Moor (ABC); Eddie's Lil' Homies – Sophie Byrne, Mark O'Toole, Anna Scullie, Eddie Betts (Netflix, NITV); Hard Quiz Kids – Chris Walker, Kevin Whyte, Tom Gleeson, John Tabbagh (ABC); Little J & Big Cuz – Ned Lander (ABC, NITV); Play School: Big Ted's Time Machine – Bryson Hall (ABC); Spooky Files – Paul Watters, Andrea Denholm, Tony Ayres, Guy Edmonds, Matt Zeremes (ABC)	Best Stand-Up Special: Why is My Bag All Wet? – Anne Edmonds – Guesswork Television (Network 10, Paramount+); Current Mood – Lloyd Langford – Guesswork Television (Network 10, Paramount+); Let Me Know Either Way – Mel Buttle – Guesswork Television (Network 10, Paramount+); Melbourne International Comedy Festival - The Allstars Supershow (ABC); Melbourne International Comedy Festival - The Gala (ABC); Loosey Goosey – Rove McManus – Guesswork Television (Network 10, Paramount+)
Best Lead Actor in Drama: Felix Cameron – Boy Swallows Universe; Zac Burgess – Boy Swallows Universe; Rob Collins – Total Control; Brendan Cowell – Plum; Sam Neill – The Twelve; Noah Taylor – Thou Shalt Not Steal	Best Lead Actress in Drama: Phoebe Tonkin – Boy Swallows Universe; Asher Keddie – Fake; Deborah Mailman – Total Control; Leah Purcell – High Country; Anna Torv – Territory; Sherry-Lee Watson – Thou Shalt Not Steal
Best Supporting Actor in Drama: Lee Tiger Halley – Boy Swallows Universe; Simon Baker – Boy Swallows Universe; Wayne Blair – Total Control; Bryan Brown – Boy Swallows Universe; Travis Fimmel – Boy Swallows Universe; Ewen Leslie – Prosper	Best Supporting Actress in Drama: Deborah Mailman – Boy Swallows Universe; Essie Davis – Exposure; Rachel Griffiths – Total Control; Heather Mitchell – Fake; Sophie Wilde – Boy Swallows Universe; Asher Yasbincek – Heartbreak High
Best Comedy Performer: Tom Gleeson – Hard Quiz; Wil Anderson – Taskmaster Australia; Aaron Chen – Guy Montgomery's Guy Mont-Spelling Bee; Anne Edmonds – Taskmaster Australia; Guy Montgomery – Guy Montgomery's Guy Mont-Spelling Bee; Charlie Pickering – The Weekly with Charlie Pickering	Best Acting in a Comedy: Kitty Flanagan – Fisk; Patrick Brammall – Colin from Accounts; Aaron Chen – Fisk; Harriet Dyer – Colin from Accounts; Genevieve Hegney – Colin from Accounts; Asher Keddie – Strife; Michael Theo – Austin; Felicity Ward – The Office
Best Direction in Drama or Comedy: Bharat Nalluri – Boy Swallows Universe – Episode 1: Boy Smells Rat; Trent O'Donnell – Colin from Accounts – Episode 3: Heavy; Madeline Dyer – Colin from Accounts – Episode 6: Yass King; Emma Freeman – Fake – Episode 5: Love Kitten; Dylan River – Thou Shalt Not Steal – Episode 2: Stealin' Donkeys	Best Direction in Non-Fiction Television: Sally Browning – Muster Dogs – Episode 3; Simon Francis – Anne Edmonds: Why is My Bag All Wet?; Mariel Thomas – Better Date than Never – Episode 1; Marc Fennel – Stuff the British Stole – Episode 5; Tosca Looby & Ben Lawrence – The Jury: Death on the Staircase – Episode 1: The Death
Best Screenplay in Television: John Collee – Boy Swallows Universe – Episode 4: Boy Loses Dad; Patrick Brammall & Harriet Dyer – Colin from Accounts – Episode 6: Yass King; Anya Beyersdorf – Fake – Episode 1: Lanolin; Penny Flanagan & Kitty Flanagan – Fisk – Episode 3: "I'm the Fisk"; Tanith Glynn-Maloney, Sophie Miller & Dylan River – Thou Shalt Not Steal – Episode 2: Stealin' Donkeys	Best Casting: Nikki Barrett – Boy Swallows Universe; Kirsty McGregor & Stevie Ray – Colin from Accounts; Nathan Lloyd – Fake; Leigh Pickford – The Artful Dodger; Kirsty McGregor – The Twelve
Best Cinematography in Television: Shelley Farthing-Dawe – Boy Swallows Universe – Episode 4: Boy Loses Dad; Mark Wareham – Boy Swallows Universe – Episode 6: Boy Seeks Work; Aaron McLisky – Exposure – Episode 5; Simon Duggan – Territory – Episode 1; Tyson Perkins – Thou Shalt Not Steal – Episode 2: Stealin' Donkeys	Best Costume Design in Television: Marion Boyce – Ladies in Black – Episode 2: Secret Designs; Kerry Thompson – Boy Swallows Universe – Episode 4: Boy Loses Dad; Rita Carmody – Heartbreak High – Episode 1: Bird Psycho; Ntombi Moyo – Swift Street – Episode 1; Xanthe Heubel – The Artful Dodger – Episode 6: Bully in the Alley
Best Editing in Television: Mark Perry – Boy Swallows Universe – Episode 4: Boy Loses Dad; Danielle Bosenberg – Colin from Accounts – Episode 3: Heavy; Leila Gaabi – Exposure – Episode 5; Katie Flaxman – Fisk – Episode 3: "I'm the Fisk"; Rodrigo Balart – The Artful Dodger – Episode 6: Bully in the Alley	Best Production Design in Television: Michelle McGahey – Boy Swallows Universe – Episode 4: Boy Loses Dad; Marni Kornhauser – Exposure – Episode 5; Roslyn Durnford – House of Gods – Episode 6: When God Speaks; Michael Rumpf – Ladies in Black – Episode 2: Secret Designs; Matt Putland – The Artful Dodger – Episode 6: Bully in the Alley
Best Original Music Score in Television: Joff Bush, Daniel O'Brien, Jazz Darcy, Joseph Twist – Bluey – Episode 2: The Sign; Johnny Klimek, Gabriel Isaac Mounsey – Boy Swallows Universe – Episode 4: Boy Loses Dad; Mikey Young – Exposure – Episode 5; Antony Partos – The Artful Dodger – Episode 8: Untapped Potential; Vincent Goodyer – Thou Shalt Not Steal – Episode 2: Stealin' Donkeys	Best Sound in Television: Sam Hayward, Scott Mulready, Danielle Wiessner, Nigel Christensen – Boy Swallows Universe – Episode 4: Boy Loses Dad; Dan Brumm – Bluey – Episode 2: The Sign; Paul Finlay, Andrew Miller, Joe Mount, Jared Dwyer – Exposure – Episode 5; Josh Williams, Pete Smith, Duncan Campbell, Tom Heuzenroeder – Territory – Episode 1; Luke Mynott – Thou Shalt Not Steal – Episode 2: Stealin' Donkeys

== Documentary ==
Best Documentary: Otto by Otto – Gracie Otto, Cody Greenwood, Nicole O'Donohue; A Horse Named Winx – Janine Hosking; Every Little Thing – Sally Aitken, Bettina Dalton; Midnight Oil: The Hardest Line – Paul Clarke, Carolina Sorensen, Mikael Borglund, Martin Fabinyi; Porcelain War – Brendan Bellomo, Slava Leontyev, Camilla Mazzaferro, Aniela Sidorska, Paula Du Pré Pesmen, Olivia Ahnemann; The Musical Mind: A Portrait in Process – Scott Hicks, Kerry Heysen, Jett Heysen-Hicks, David Chiem	Best Documentary or Factual Television Program: Miriam Margolyes Impossibly Australian – Jo Siddiqui, Helen Barrow, Paulo Vivan, Laurie Critchley, Julie Hanna (ABC); Australia's Sleep Revolution with Dr Michael Mosley – Celia Tait (SBS); I Was Actually There – Kirk Docker, Josh Schmidt, Loni Cooper, Julie Hanna (ABC); Maggie Beer's Big Mission – Celia Tait, Laki Baker, Phillipa Hutchinson (ABC); Ray Martin: The Last Goodbye – Sky Kinninmont, Deb Spinocchia, Kylie Washington (SBS); Who Do You Think You Are? – Maxine Gray (SBS)
Best Editing in a Documentary: Gretchen Peterson – Midnight Oil: The Hardest Line; Johanna Scott – Onefour: Against All Odds; Orly Danon – Revealed: Ben Roberts-Smith - Truth On Trial; Sean Lahiff – The Speedway Murders; Karen Johnson – Welcome to Babel	Best Cinematography in a Documentary: Geoffrey Hall & Emerson Hoskin – The Musical Mind: A Portrait in Process; Jeff Siberry – Megafauna: What Killed Australia's Giants?; Dan Freene & Jordan Ritz – Skategoat; Dean Brosche – The Mission; Maxx Corkindale – The Speedway Murders
Best Original Music Score in a Documentary: Jessica Wells – Mozart's Sister; Damien Lane – Aquarius; Dmitri Golovko, Burkhard Dallwitz, Brett Aplin – Brand Bollywood Downunder; Stefan Gregory – Otto by Otto; Antony Partos, Jackson Milas, Josh Pearson, Josie Mann – The Speedway Murders	Best Sound in a Documentary: Damian Jory – Mozart's Sister; Abigail Sie – A Horse Named Winx; Wayne Pashley, Travis Handley, Stephen Hopes, Jason King – Midnight Oil: The Hardest Line; Pete Smith, Tom Heuzenroeder – The Musical Mind: A Portrait in Process; Michael Darren, Pete Smith, Des Kenneally, Hamish Keen – The Speedway Murders

== Short form and online ==
Best Short Film: Gorgo – Veniamin Gialouris, Katie Amos, Danielle Stamoulos; And the Ocean Agreed – Tanya Modini, Luisa Martiri, Stephanie Dower; Before We Sleep – Josh Lacy, Michelle Walker, Mason Jay Lewis, Joshua Walsh; Die Bully Die – Nathan Lacey, Nick Lacey, Matthew Backer, Drew Weston; Favourites – Nick Russell, Nick Musgrove; Why We Fight – Danielle Cormack, Nicole da Silva	Best Short Animation
Best Online Drama or Comedy: Buried – Fran Derham, Charlotte George, Miriam Glaser; Bad Ancestors – Vanilla Tupu, Jessica Magro, Wendy Mocke, Rizcel Gagawanan; Descent – Millie Holten, Madi Savage, Ella Lawry, Liam Fitzgibbon, Sam Lingham; Girl Crush – Ally Morgan, Hew Sandison, Sayuri Kawamura, Madeleine Mallis, Samantha Andrew; Urvi Went to an All Girls School – Urvi Majumdar, Nina Oyama, Lauren Nichols, Kate Cornish; Videoland – Jessica Smith, Scarlett Koehne

== Additional awards ==
Best Hair and Makeup: Lesley Vanderwalt, Larry Van Duynhoven, Matteo Silvi, Luca Vannella – Furiosa: A Mad Max Saga; Angela Conte – Boy Swallows Universe; John Logue – Ladies in Black; Lynne O'Brien – The Artful Dodger; Nick Nicolaou, Paul Katte, Carol Cameron – The Moogai	Best Visual Effects or Animation: Luke Millar, Andy Taylor, Craig Young, Tim Walker – Better Man; Nelson Sepulveda-Fauser, Jhon Alvarado, Alé Melendez, Sebastian Ravagnani, Nicolas Caillier – Alien: Romulus; Andrew Jackson, Jason Bath, Guido Wolter, Rachel Copp, Andy Williams – Furiosa: A Mad Max Saga; Matt Sloan, Chris McClintock, Matt Greig, Rachel Copp, Dan Oliver – The Fall Guy; Frazer Churchill, Fiona Chilton, Stephen King, Feargal Stewart, Alex Popescu – Transformers One
Best Original Song: "Fine" (Meg Washington, Brendan Maclean & The Prison Choir) – How to Make Gravy; "Dream On" (Meg Washington, Electric Fields & The Prison Choir) – How to Make Gravy; "Forbidden Road" (Robbie Williams, Freddy Wexler, Sacha Skarbek) – Better Man; "Side by Side" (Paul Kelly) – Runt; "Streetlights" (Jacob Harvey) – Under Streetlights	Best Soundtrack: Heartbreak High – Jemma Burns; Better Man – Jordan Carroll; Boy Swallows Universe – Jemma Burns; How to Make Gravy – Meg Washington; Last Days of the Space Age – Allegra Caldwell
Audience Choice Award for Favourite Film: Wicked; Deadpool & Wolverine; Inside Out 2; It Ends with Us; Moana 2; Twisters	Audience Choice Award for Favourite Television Show: Outer Banks; Boy Swallows Universe; Bridgerton; Emily in Paris; Heartbreak High; Heartstopper
Audience Choice Award for Favourite Australian Actor: Chris Hemsworth; Hugh Jackman; Jacob Elordi; Liam Hemsworth; Travis Fimmel; Will McDonald	Audience Choice Award for Favourite Australian Actress: Margot Robbie; Cate Blanchett; Celeste Barber; Chloé Hayden; Nicole Kidman; Phoebe Tonkin
Audience Choice Award for Favourite Australian Media Personality: Robert Irwin; Abbie Chatfield; Chris Brown; Hamish Blake; Jimmy Rees; Sophie Monk	Audience Choice Award for Favourite Australian Digital Creator: Bridey Drake; Chloé Hayden; Esmé Louise James; Indy Clinton; Jiny Maeng; Luke and Sassy Scott; Maddy Macrae; Olly Bowman
