= Bring Her Back =

2025 film by Danny and Michael Philippou

- Theatrical release poster
- Directed by: Danny Philippou; Michael Philippou
- Written by: Danny Philippou; Bill Hinzman
- Produced by: Samantha Jennings; Kristina Ceyton
- Starring: Billy Barratt; Sora Wong; Jonah Wren Phillips; Sally Hawkins
- Cinematography: Aaron McLisky
- Edited by: Geoff Lamb
- Music by: Cornel Wilczek
- Production company: Causeway Films
- Distributed by: Stage 6 Films (through Sony Pictures Releasing International)
- Release date: 29 May 2025
- Running time: 104 minutes
- Country: Australia
- Language: English
- Budget: $15 million
- Box office: $39.4 million

Bring Her Back is a 2025 Australian supernatural folk horror film directed by Danny and Michael Philippou and written by Danny Philippou and Bill Hinzman. It stars Billy Barratt, Sora Wong, Jonah Wren Phillips, and Sally Hawkins. The film follows two step-siblings who are placed in an occult ritual by their new foster mother.

Bring Her Back was theatrically released by Sony Pictures Releasing International in Australia on 29 May 2025. It received positive reviews, with Hawkins's performance highlighted, and grossed $39.4 million on a budget of $15 million.

== Plot ==
17-year-old Andy and his visually impaired step-sister Piper find their father Phil, who has been undergoing treatment for cancer, dead in the shower. They are sent to live with eccentric former counselor Laura, who is also fostering a pre-teen boy named Oliver. Laura claims Oliver has stopped talking since the death of Laura's daughter, Cathy, who was also blind and drowned in their backyard pool. Andy becomes unsettled by both Laura and Oliver's strange behavior, and Laura's favouritism toward Piper. At Phil's funeral, Laura steals a lock of hair from his corpse. That night, Laura encourages Andy to talk about his feelings, and he reveals that he resents his father for being abusive toward him but affectionate toward Piper. Laura reflects on Cathy's death and states that she would do anything just to hear Cathy call her "mum" one last time.

The next day, Andy releases Oliver from the room Laura locked him in and encourages him to write on a notepad to communicate. Oliver subsequently tries to eat a kitchen knife, mutilating his mouth; when Andy carries him across the white border that circles Laura's property to get help, Oliver violently convulses before uttering "help me". Andy later finds that Oliver has written "bird" on the notepad.

Laura returns Oliver to his mute state by mimicking a ritual from a VHS tape and feeding him Phil's hair. While showering, Andy hallucinates an apparition of Phil telling him, "She'll die in the rain." Andy slips and awakens in the hospital with a concussion. Laura takes Piper to the garden shed, where she has been keeping Cathy's corpse in a freezer, and dresses her in Cathy's sweater. After bringing Andy home from the hospital, she watches a VHS tape in which the corpse of the deceased is fed to a possessed host, who then regurgitates the corpse into the body of a person recently killed in the same manner as the one to be resurrected, bringing them back to life. Laura intends to drown Piper in the pool during the rainstorm, use Oliver — actually a kidnapped child now possessed by a demon summoned by Laura – to eat Cathy's corpse, and regurgitate it into Piper to bring back Cathy. Later that night, Laura punches Piper while she sleeps and frames Andy for the assault to drive a wedge between the siblings.

As the demon grows increasingly hungry and restless, Oliver takes to eating inorganic material and parts of his own body. Andy goes to the foster agency and complains about Laura. While there, he sees a poster for a missing child named Connor Bird; recognising Connor as "Oliver", he convinces his social worker Wendy to investigate. In Wendy's presence, Andy leaves Piper a voicemail, in which he apologises for keeping their father's abuse of him a secret and warns her about Laura, but Laura intercepts the message and hears Wendy's voice. Expecting a visit, she cleans the house to deceive Wendy. During the visit, Wendy spots blood on Laura, and when questioned about it, Laura breaks down and desperately begs for Wendy's help, revealing her plan to resurrect Cathy. Wendy and Andy discover Connor eating Cathy's corpse in the shed. They attempt to flee but Laura runs them over with her car, killing Wendy and injuring Andy, whom Laura then drowns in a rain puddle.

Laura brings Piper home from goalball practice for the ritual. Having eaten some of Andy's flesh, Connor speaks with Andy's voice to lure Piper. Suspecting something is amiss, Piper locks herself in the bathroom and breaks down upon discovering Andy's body. Laura unlocks the door, drags Piper to the pool, and begins drowning her while Connor watches. Piper struggles, and Laura tearfully releases her after Piper cries out "Mum!" Piper escapes and is followed by Connor, who attacks her. Piper escapes to the road, where she is rescued by a passing car. Connor, who had been chasing her, steps past the white border and collapses as the demon leaves his body. Police arrive, identify Connor, and find Laura cradling Cathy's corpse in the pool.

== Cast ==
- Billy Barratt as Andy, a guilt-ridden and traumatised 17-year-old boy
- Sora Wong as Piper, Andy's visually impaired younger stepsister
- Sally Hawkins as Laura, a grieving mother
- Jonah Wren Phillips as Oliver / Connor Bird, Laura's foster son
- Sally-Anne Upton as Wendy, Andy and Piper's social worker
- Stephen Phillips as Phil, Andy and Piper's deceased father
- Mischa Heywood as Cathy, Laura's deceased 12-year-old daughter

== Production ==
In April 2024 it was announced that brothers Danny and Michael Philippou were developing an original horror film follow-up to their first film Talk to Me, with producers Samantha Jennings and Kristina Ceyton at Causeway Films. The film had Sally Hawkins attached to star and A24 was handling sales for distribution worldwide. The Philippou brothers originally planned to direct a film adaptation of Street Fighter in 2023, but exited the film to focus on Bring Her Back. They were inspired by psycho-biddy horror. The script was written by Danny Philippou and Bill Hinzman, and produced by the Philippou brothers with financing from the South Australian Film Corporation and Salmira Productions.

In May 2024, Billy Barratt, Jonah Wren Phillips, Sally-Anne Upton, Stephen Phillips, and Sora Wong joined the cast of the film. In an interview with People, Wong stated that she had "zero experience with acting" and auditioned after her mother discovered the casting call on Facebook. Principal photography began in June 2024. The Philippous returned to their home state of South Australia to film in Adelaide and surrounding areas such as Lightsview. Filming concluded after 41 days. Aaron McLisky served as cinematographer.

The Philippou brothers described the process of filming gory scenes with Phillips in his role as Oliver. For the scene in which Oliver bites on a kitchen knife, Danny Philippou helped design the sound by biting on a real knife. During filming, Phillips chewed on a prop knife made out of foam; the footage was enhanced later with visual effects. For the scene in which Oliver chews through a wooden kitchen countertop, a prop countertop was filled with chocolate and designed to break into soft pieces that looked like splinters. Phillips wore a "fake mouth" to assist.

Production took place around Adelaide, including Adelaide Studios, with post-production led by KOJO Studios. The crew were mostly South Australian. Editing was done by Geoff Lamb and the score was composed by Cornel Wilczek. The film was executive produced by the Philippous, Daniel Negret, Salman Al-Rashid, and Sam Frohman.

== Release ==
In February 2025, Sony Pictures Worldwide Acquisitions acquired the international distribution rights to the film excluding China, Russia, and Japan. Stage 6 Films (through Sony Pictures Releasing International) are distributors of the film.

Bring Her Back had a special screening for Adelaide Film Festival club members on 26 May 2025, before being released in cinemas in Australia on 29 May 2025 by Stage 6 Films. It was released on the following day in the United States by A24. It was released in the United Kingdom on 1 August 2025.

== Reception ==
=== Box office ===
As of September 6, 2025, Bring Her Back has grossed $19.3 million in the United States and Canada and $19.8 million in other territories, for a worldwide total of $39.1 million. In the US and Canada Bring Her Back was released alongside Karate Kid: Legends and was projected to gross $5–7 million from 2,449 theatres in its opening weekend. The film made $3.1 million on its first day, including $850,000 from Thursday night previews. It went on to debut to $7.1 million, finishing in third.

=== Critical response ===
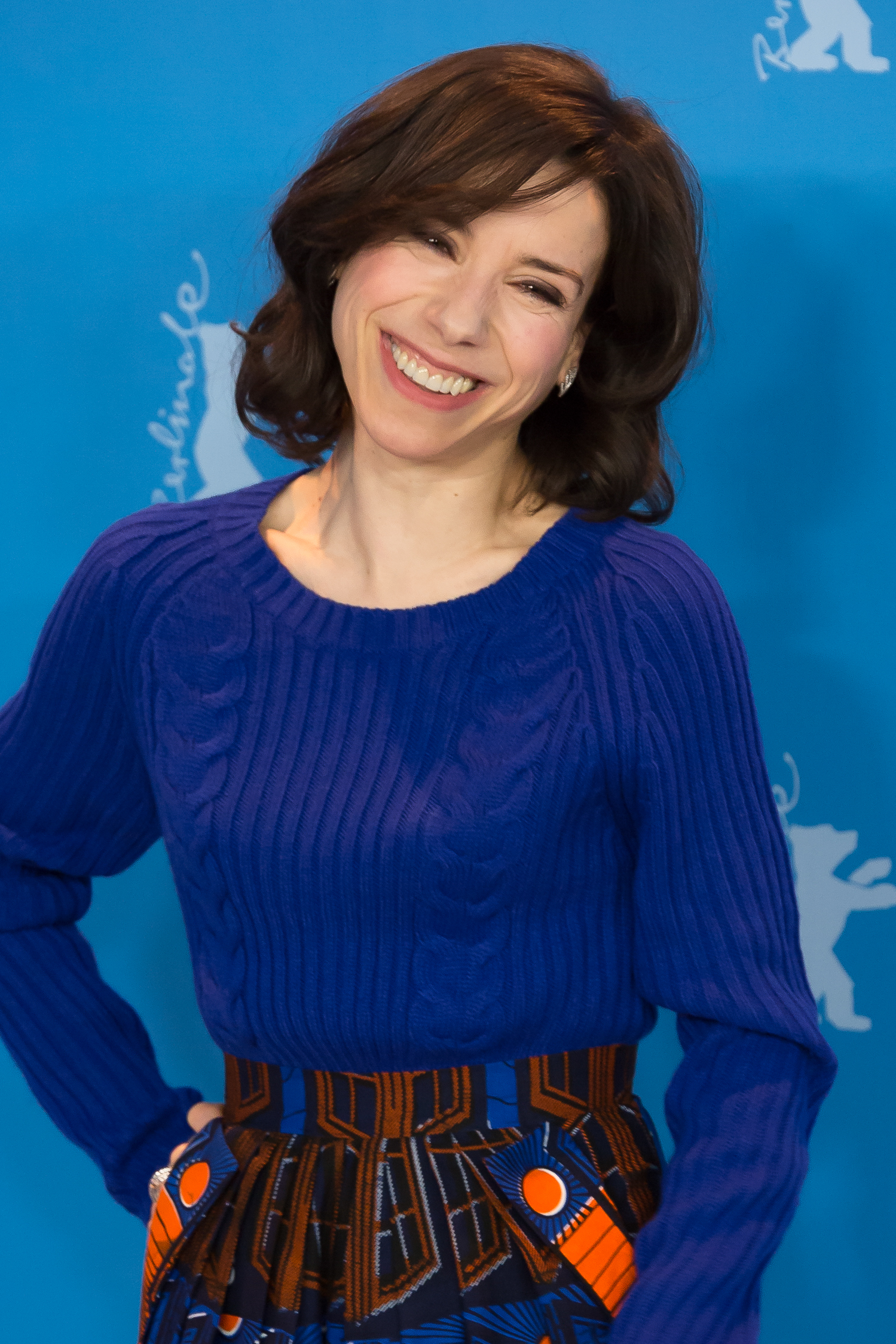
Sally Hawkins' performance as Laura received acclaim.

On the review aggregator website Rotten Tomatoes, 89% of 270 critics' reviews are positive, with an average rating of 7.6/10. The website's consensus reads: "A domestic nightmare that draws its most profound scares from Sally Hawkins' deranged performance, Bring Her Back is an exemplary chiller that reaffirms directors Danny and Michael Philippou as modern masters of horror." Metacritic, which uses a weighted average, assigned the film a score of 75 out of 100, based on 40 critics, indicating "generally favorable" reviews. Audiences polled by CinemaScore gave the film an average grade of "B+" on an A+ to F scale, while those surveyed by PostTrak gave it an 80% overall positive score, with 57% saying they would definitely recommend it.

Monica Castillo from RogerEbert.com gave the film three out of four, writing that it is "perhaps more chilling—if slightly less focused—than their breakout feature debut". Castillo noted the fast pace and shocking moments, but criticised the VHS segments as an "unnecessary scare tactic". She praised Hawkins, Barratt and Wong for their emotionally deep performances and the sustained tension, but wrote that Bring Her Back did "not meet the high watermark" of Talk to Me. Jeanette Catsoulis of the New York Times praised the "sublime lead performances", with particular praise for Barratt. Catsoulis also praised the visual shock value and emotional weight, but called the film "more logically muddled than its predecessor". David Fear of Rolling Stone wrote that it was a strong follow-up to Talk to Me, with a "superior grasp of pacing and catch-release tension". Fear also praised Oliver's character as rising above "the whole creepy-youngster trope", having derided it as "overused and lazy in most cases".

A review by Sammie Purcell from Rough Draft Atlanta praised the practical effects and upsetting nature of the film, but "it doesn’t earn the depth of emotion it wants to achieve." Purcell praised Phillips' performance as Oliver as "one of the film’s best and, oddly enough, manages to offer a little bit of humor in an otherwise bleak narrative ... It's hard to balance really effective emotionality with the type of vicious storytelling the Philippous appear to be interested in", having found the mix of grotesque visuals and emotional themes to be ineffective. Barry Wurst from HollywoodinToto gave the film one and a half. Wurst wrote that he found the violent scenes too intense and "desperate for attention". However, he praised Hawkins as the "reason to see [the film]".

== Accolades ==
Award	Date of ceremony	Category	Recipient(s)	Result	Ref.
Golden Trailer Awards	29 May 2025	Best Sound Editing	A24 / AV Squad (for "Trust No One")	Nominated	
Astra Midseason Movie Awards	3 July 2025	Best Actress	Sally Hawkins	Nominated	
Astra Midseason Movie Awards	3 July 2025	Best Horror	Bring Her Back	Won	
Critics' Choice Super Awards	7 August 2025	Best Horror Movie	Bring Her Back	Nominated	
Critics' Choice Super Awards	7 August 2025	Best Actress in a Horror Movie	Sally Hawkins	Nominated	
Fangoria Chainsaw Awards	19 October 2025	Best Wide Release	Bring Her Back	Nominated	
Fangoria Chainsaw Awards	19 October 2025	Best Lead Performance	Sally Hawkins	Nominated	
Fangoria Chainsaw Awards	19 October 2025	Best Screenplay	Bill Hinzman & Danny Philippou	Nominated	
Hollywood Music in Media Awards	19 November 2025	Original Score – Horror/Thriller Film	Cornel Wilczek	Nominated	
Astra Film Awards	9 January 2026	Best Horror or Thriller Feature	Bring Her Back	Nominated	
Astra Film Awards	9 January 2026	Best Performance in a Horror or Thriller	Sally Hawkins	Nominated	
AACTA Awards	6 February 2026	Best Film	Bring Her Back	Won	
AACTA Awards	6 February 2026	Best Direction	Danny and Michael Philippou	Won	
AACTA Awards	6 February 2026	Best Screenplay	Danny Philippou and Bill Hinzman	Nominated	
AACTA Awards	6 February 2026	Best Lead Actress	Sally Hawkins	Won	
AACTA Awards	6 February 2026	Best Supporting Actor	Jonah Wren Phillips	Nominated	
AACTA Awards	6 February 2026	Best Supporting Actress	Sally-Anne Upton	Nominated	
AACTA Awards	6 February 2026	Best Supporting Actress	Sora Wong	Nominated	
AACTA Awards	6 February 2026	Best Cinematography	Aaron McLisky	Won	
AACTA Awards	6 February 2026	Best Editing	Geoff Lamb	Won	
AACTA Awards	6 February 2026	Best Original Music Score	Cornel Wilczek	Won	
AACTA Awards	6 February 2026	Best Sound	Emma Bortignon, Nick Steele, Hamish Keen, Cameron Grant, Lachlan Harris, Pete Smith	Won	
AACTA Awards	6 February 2026	Best Costume Design	Anna Cahill	Won	
AACTA Awards	6 February 2026	Best Casting	Nikki Barrett	Won	
AACTA Awards	6 February 2026	Best Hair and Makeup	Rebecca Buratto, Larry Van Duynhoven, Paul Katte, Nick Nicolaou, Karen Gower, Mariel McClorey	Won	
AACTA Awards	6 February 2026	Best Soundtrack	Andrew Koťátko	Nominated	
