= Esmé Louise James =

Australian historian

- Born: January 6, 1997 (age 29); Worksop, England
- Education: University of Melbourne
- Occupations: TikToker, author, journalist, sex historian
- Years active: 2020–present
- Notable work: Kinky History

TikTok information
- Page: Esmé Louise James
- Followers: 2.3M
- Last updated: April 2023
- Website: esmeljames.com

Esmé Louise James (born 6 January 1997) is a British-born Australian sex historian, author, journalist, and TikTok user known for Kinky History, an online educational video and podcast series about the history of human sexuality, as well as a non-fiction book of the same name, released in Australia and New Zealand in October 2023. The World English-language rights were sold to TarcherPerigee and published in the US in June 2024. The rights for the Dutch translation were sold to Boeklyn BV (Vilvoorde, Belgium

James has written for outlets including Archer, The Sydney Morning Herald, and The Conversation, being nominated for a Walkley Award for her work with the latter. James is based in Melbourne, Australia.

== Career ==
=== Online ===
Since joining TikTok in 2020, James has acquired around 2.5 million followers on the platform as of February 2023.

James is best known for her TikTok series Kinky History, in which she explains and corrects misconceptions about historical human sexuality, with topics including the historical roots of kink, pornography, sex toys, fetishes, oral sex, and STIs. She created the series in 2020, having seen a university friend's art history TikTok series and wanting to discuss the research she had done for her PhD thesis. The series quickly gained traction, with the second video in the series exceeding 1 million views within a day. By September 2022, she was ranked in the top 1 percent of global TikTok creators, based on metrics of likes, shares, comments, and total view counts. As of February 2023, her TikTok channel had reached 2.5 million followers.

In early 2022, James and her mother, Susan James, announced a new TikTok-exclusive documentary series entitled SexTistics, which would focus on statistical research of gender, identity, and sexuality in modern-day Australia and was funded by TikTok, Screen Australia, and NZ On Air as part of their joint "Every Voice" funding initiative.

In August 2022, James gave a talk at TEDxSydney entitled "Writing kinky sex back into the history pages". Later in the year, she was nominated at the 12th AACTA Awards for an Audience Choice Award for Best Digital Creator. She was nominated again at the 14th AACTA Awards.

In 2023, James launched a podcast version of Kinky History, produced via DM Podcasts. She has also appeared on podcasts including Jim Jefferies' I Don't Know About That and Triple J's The Hookup.

=== Writing ===
As a teenager, James self-published several novels before writing the novella Honeyflower and Pansy in 2012, which was initially picked up by US publisher Astrea Press, who signed the 17-year-old James to a five-year contract. The novella was eventually published electronically by Clean Reads in 2015, as was her second novel, The Awakening, in 2017.

James was one of the top 30 writers in the SBS 2020 Emerging Writers' Competition and was thus featured in the competition's anthology, Roots: Home is Who We Are. Her articles, poems, and short stories have appeared in the student publications Farrago, Lot's Wife, Judy's Punch, and Rabelais, and in media outlets Archer, Hecate, The Sydney Morning Herald, and The Conversation. For her work with the latter, she and editor Patrick Lenton were jointly nominated for a 2022 Walkley Award for Excellence in Journalism.

In November 2022, John M. Green's Pantera Press announced they had acquired the world rights to James' upcoming book, Kinky History: The Stories Behind Our Intimate Lives, Past and Present, and would publish it for an October 2023 release.

== Education and personal life ==
James completed her PhD in English and Theatre Studies at the University of Melbourne's School of Culture and Communication in 2024. Her PhD thesis focused on the history of pornography and literary eroticism from the 1700s to the early 1900s. Her academic focus was initially on the history of religion before shifting to sexuality.

Prior to university, James grew up in the suburb of Mordialloc and attended Beaconhills College. She is the daughter of Susan James, an outreach fellow at the University of Melbourne's school of mathematics and statistics; the two have collaborated on Kinky History and SexTistics. James also has a brother with high needs nonverbal autism and epilepsy, of whom she is the primary caregiver; she was also diagnosed with autism herself as an adult. She and her boyfriend, Nicolas Muniz-Saavedra, began dating shortly before the COVID-19 lockdown. She is bisexual, having come out at the end of her undergraduate studies.

James has been vocal on a number of social issues. She attended a Melbourne-based abortion rights protest in 2019 and spoke at another one in 2022, held after the apparent overturn of Roe v. Wade in America. In 2024, Esmé founded the Let's Get Explicit campaign, which provoked conversation about violence against women in Australia.

== Bibliography ==
=== Non-fiction books ===
- Kinky History: The Stories Behind Our Intimate Lives, Past and Present (August 2023, Pantera Press)
- Kinky History: A Rollicking Journey through Our Sexual Past, Present, and Future (June 2024, TarcherPerigee)

=== Novels ===
- Honeyflower and Pansy. Clean Reads (13 April 2015). ASIN B00W30OOP2
- The Awakening. Clean Reads (6 November 2017). ASIN B0777HGZ53
- Becoming Venus. Affirm Press (1 September 2026). ISBN 9781761639296

=== Short stories ===
- "Helium Boy" (2017), published in Farrago
- "Our Lullaby" (2021), published in Roots; Home is Who We Are: Voices from the SBS Emerging Writers’ Competition. Hardie Grant Press. ISBN 9781743797815

=== Articles ===
- "Eating Ourselves Into Extinction". Farrago (29 March 2017)
- "The History of the Dildo". Farrago (11 August 2019)
- "Venus in Furs: The Enslaved Dominatrix of the Nineteenth Century". Judy's Punch (October 29, 2019)
- "Kink tales: When my best friend became my Sub". Archer (5 November 2019)
- "Celebrating Enigmas: Re-Examining Gertrude Stein's Relationship to the Literary Canon". Hecate, Vol. 46, Issue 1-2 (1 May 2020)
- "Ethical porn: The socially conscious pervert". Archer (28 May 2020)
- "Did everyone in Bridgerton have syphilis? Just how sexy would it really have been in Regency era London?". The Conversation (12 April 2022)
- "The explosive history of the 2,000-year-old Pompeii 'masturbating' man". The Conversation (14 June 2022)
- "Pornography, the devil and baboons in fancy dress: what went on at the infamous historical Hellfire Club". The Conversation (30 June 2022)
- "The long and satisfying 28,000-year history of the dildo". The Conversation (22 Feb 2023).
- "The foot scene in House of the Dragon was upsetting, but it's nothing compared to the real history of the fetish". The Conversation (25 October 2022)
- "After 10 years of swiping right, what have we gained from Tinder?". The Sydney Morning Herald (6 September 2022)

=== Poetry ===
- "The Short and Melancholy Tale of Ghost Boy and His Ever-Vanishing Dream". Farrago, April 2017
- "The Picnic". Farrago, June 2017
- "A Union". Farrago, April 2018
- "Slug.". Farrago, April 2019
- "autumn". Lot's Wife, Sept 2019
- "winter". Lot's Wife, Sept 2019
- "pearl". Judy's Punch, November 2019
- "Consummation". Lot's Wife, May 2020
- "Sunday". Lot's Wife, August 2020
- "5:38pm on the Balcony". Rabelais, August 2020
- "The Master Builder". Judy's Punch, November 2020
- "My Nan Plays Piano". Judy's Punch, November 2020

== Awards ==
- Nomination for an Audience Choice Award, Best Digital Creator, AACTA Awards, 2025.
- Winner of Mediaweek's Next of the Best, Digital Talent, 2024.
- Rising Star, Arts Alumni Award, University of Melbourne, 2023.
- Nomination for an Audience Choice Award, Best Digital Creator, AACTA Awards, 2022.
- Nomination for a Walkley Award, "Headline, Caption, or Hook," 2022 (joint nomination with editor Patrick Lenton)
