= AACTA Award for Best Feature Length Documentary =

Film award

Best Feature Length Documentary AACTA Award
- Country: Australia
- Presented by: Australian Academy of Cinema and Television Arts (AACTA)
- First award: 2009
- Currently held by: Mrs Carey’s Concert (2011)
- Website: http://www.aacta.org

The AACTA Award for Best Feature Length Documentary, is a non-feature film award presented by the Australian Academy of Cinema and Television Arts (AACTA) to an Australian documentary that is longer than sixty minutes in duration and "is a creative treatment of actuality other than a news, current affairs, sports coverage, magazine, infotainment or light entertainment program. Prior to the establishment of the Academy in 2011, the award was presented by the Australian Film Institute (AFI) at the annual Australian Film Institute Awards (more commonly known as the AFI Awards) from 2009–2010. A single award for Best Documentary was handed out from 1958–2008, before it was split into three categories: Best Feature Length Documentary, Best Documentary Under One Hour and Best Documentary Series. The award is presented at the AACTA Awards Luncheon, a black tie event which celebrates achievements in film production, television, documentaries and short films.

== Winners and nominees ==
In the following table, winners are listed first, in boldface and highlighted in gold; those listed below the winner that are not in boldface or highlighted are the nominees.

Winner

=== AFI Awards (2008-2010) ===
Year	Film	Producer(s)
2008 (50th)	**Not Quite Hollywood: The Wild, Untold Story of Ozploitation!**	**Craig Griffin, Michael Lynch**
2008 (50th)	Beyond Our Ken	Luke Walker
2008 (50th)	The Oasis	Ian Darling
2008 (50th)	Rare Chicken Rescue	Vickie Gest
2009 (51st)	**Glass: A Portrait of Philip in Twelve Parts**	**Scott Hicks, Susanne Preisler**
2009 (51st)	Bastardy	Philippa Campey, Amiel Courtin-Wilson, Lynn-Maree Milburn, Andrew de Groot
2009 (51st)	The Choir	Chris Hilton, Michael Davie
2009 (51st)	Lionel	Lizzette Atkins
2010 (52nd)	**Contact**	**Martin Butler, Bentley Dean**
2010 (52nd)	Inside the Firestorm	Lucy Maclaren, Alex West
2010 (52nd)	The Snowman	Rachel Landers, Dylan Blowen
2010 (52nd)	Strange Birds in Paradise - A West Papuan Story	Jamie Nicolai, John Cherry

=== AACTA Awards (2012-) ===
Year	Film	Producer(s)
2011 **(1st)**	**Mrs Carey's Concert**	**Bob Connolly**, **Helen Panckhurst** and **Sophie Raymond**
2011 **(1st)**	Life in Movement	Sophie Hyde and Bryan Mason
2011 **(1st)**	Shut Up Little Man! An Audio Misadventure	Sophie Hyde and Matthew Bate
2011 **(1st)**	The Tall Man	Darren Dale
2012 (2nd)	**Storm Surfers 3D**	**Ellenor Cox and Marcus Gillezeau**
2012 (2nd)	A Common Purpose	Mitzi Goldman
2012 (2nd)	The Curse of the Gothic Symphony	Veronica Fury
2012 (2nd)	Dr Sarmast's Music School	Beth Frey
2013 (3rd)	**Red Obsession**	**Warwick Ross**
2013 (3rd)	I Am A Girl	Rebecca Barry
2013 (3rd)	Once My Mother	Rod Freedman
2013 (3rd)	Shadow of Doubt	Eve Ash
2014 (4th)	**Ukraine is Not a Brothel**	**Kitty Green, Jonathan auf der Heide and Michael Latham**
2014 (4th)	All This Mayhem	George Pank, Eddie Martin and James Gay-Rees
2014 (4th)	Deepsea Challenge 3D	Andrew Wight and Brett Popplewell
2014 (4th)	The Last Impresario	Nicole O'Donohue
2015 (5th)	**That Sugar Film**	**Nick Batzias and Damon Gameau**
2015 (5th)	Gayby Baby	Charlotte Mars
2015 (5th)	Only the Dead	Patrick McDonald and Michael Ware
2015 (5th)	Sherpa	Bridget Ikin and John Smithson
2015 (5th)	Women He's Undressed	Damien Parer and Gillian Armstrong
2016 (6th)	**Chasing Asylum**	**Eva Orner**
2016 (6th)	In the Shadow of the Hill	Dan Jackson
2016 (6th)	Remembering the Man	Nickolas Bird and Eleanor Sharpe
2016 (6th)	Snow Monkey	Lizzette Atkins and George Gittoes
2017 (7th)	**Casting JonBenet**	**Kitty Green, Scott Macaulay, James Schamus**
2017 (7th)	David Stratton: A Cinematic Life	Jo-anne McGowan
2017 (7th)	Deep Water: The Real Story	Darren Dale
2017 (7th)	Whiteley	Sue Clothier, James Bogle, Peta Ayers
2017 (7th)	Zach's Ceremony	Sarah Linton, Alec Doomadgee
2018 (8th)	**Gurrumul**	**Paul Damien Williams, Shannon Swan**
2018 (8th)	Ghosthunter	Ben Lawrence, Rebecca Bennett
2018 (8th)	Jill Bilcock: Dancing the Invisible	Axel Grigor, Faramarz K-Rahber
2018 (8th)	Mountain	Jennifer Peedom, Jo-anne McGowan
2018 (8th)	Working Class Boy	Mark Joffe, Matt Campbell, Andrew Farrell, Michael Cordell
2019 (8th)	**The Australian Dream**	**Daniel Gordon, Sarah Thomson, Nick Batzias, Virginia Whitwell, John Battsek**
2019 (8th)	The Eulogy	Janine Hosking, Katey Grusovin, Trish Lake
2019 (8th)	The Final Quarter	The Final Quarter — Ian Darling, Mary Macrae
2019 (8th)	In My Blood It Runs	Maya Newell, Sophie Hyde, Rachel Naninaaq Edwardson, Larissa Behrendt
2019 (8th)	Mystify: Michael Hutchence	Richard Lowenstein, Maya Gnyp, John Battsek, Sue Murray, Mark Fennessy, Lynn-Maree Milburn, Andrew de Groot
2020 (10th)	**Firestarter – The Story of Bangarra**	**Nel Minchin, Wayne Blair, Ivan O’Mahoney**
2020 (10th)	Brazen Hussies	Catherine Dwyer, Andrea Foxworthy, Philippa Campey
2020 (10th)	Brock: Over the Top	Kriv Stenders, Veronica Fury, Alan Erson, Ruby Schmid
2020 (10th)	Looky Looky Here Comes Cooky	Steven McGregor, Danielle MacLean, Anna Grieve, Steven Thomas
2020 (10th)	Slim & I	Kriv Stenders, Chris Brown, Aline Jacques, James Arneman
2020 (10th)	Suzi Q	Liam Firmager, Tait Brady
2021 (11th)	**My Name Is Gulpilil**	**Molly Reynolds, Rolf de Heer, Peter Djigirr, David Gulpilil**
2021 (11th)	Girls Can't Surf	Christopher Nelius, Michaela Perske
2021 (11th)	I'm Wanita	Matthew Walker, Carolina Sorensen, Clare Lewis, Tait Brady
2021 (11th)	Playing With Sharks	Sally Aitken, Bettina Dalton
2021 (11th)	Strong Female Lead	Tosca Looby, Karina Holden
2021 (11th)	When the Camera Stopped Rolling	Jane Castle, Pat Fiske
2022 (12th)	**River**	**Jennifer Peedom, Joseph Nizeti, Jo-anne McGowan, John Smithson**
2022 (12th)	Ablaze	Alec Morgan, Tiriki Onus, Tom Zubrycki
2022 (12th)	Clean	Lachlan McLeod, David Elliot-Jones, Charlotte Wheaton
2022 (12th)	Everybody's Oma	Jason van Genderen, Roslyn Walker, Olivia Olley
2022 (12th)	Franklin	Kasimir Burgess, Christopher Kamen
2022 (12th)	Ithaka	Ben Lawrence, Gabriel Shipton, Adrian Devant
2023 (13th)	**John Farnham: Finding the Voice**	**Poppy Stockell, Mikael Borglund, Paul Clarke, Martin Fabinyi, Olivia Hoopmann**
2023 (13th)	The Dark Emu Story	Allan Clarke, Darren Dale, Belinda Mravicic, Jacob Hickey
2023 (13th)	Ego: The Michael Gudinski Story	Paul Goldman, Bethany Jones, Paige McGinley
2023 (13th)	The Giants	Laurence Billiet, Rachael Antony (writers, directors, producers), Helen Panckhurst (exec. producer)
2023 (13th)	Harley & Katya	Selina Milea, Blayke Hoffman, Jo-anne McGowan, Aaliyah-Jade Bradbury
2023 (13th)	The Last Daughter	Brenda Matthews, Nathaniel Schmidt, Simon Williams, Brendon Skinner
2023 (13th)	This Is Going to Be Big	Thomas Charles Hyland, Jim Wright, Josie Mason-Campbell
2023 (13th)	To Never Forget	Peter Hegedüs, Jaclyn McLendon, Bobbi-Lea Dionysius
2024 (14th)	**Otto by Otto**	**Gracie Otto, Cody Greenwood, Nicole O'Donohue**
2024 (14th)	A Horse Named Winx	Janine Hosking
2024 (14th)	Every Little Thing	Sally Aitken, Bettina Dalton
2024 (14th)	Midnight Oil: The Hardest Line	Paul Clarke, Carolina Sorensen, Mikael Borglund, Martin Fabinyi
2024 (14th)	The Musical Mind: A Portrait in Process	Scott Hicks, Kerry Heysen, Jett Heysen-Hicks, David Chiem
2024 (14th)	Porcelain War	Brendan Bellomo, Slava Leontyev, Camilla Mazzaferro, Aniela Sidorska, Paula Du Pré Pesmen, Olivia Ahnemann

== See also ==
- AACTA Awards
