= You Can't Ask That (Canadian TV series) =

Canadian television series

You Can't Ask That is a Canadian television documentary series, which premiered in 2019 on CBC Television and AMI-tv. The series was produced by Izabel Chevrier and directed by Mariane McGraw.

An adaptation of the Australian series You Can't Ask That, it centres on people with disabilities, who help to educate viewers about their disabilities by answering many of the questions that people often want to know but feel like they're not allowed to ask.

The series won the Canadian Screen Award for Best Factual Program or Series at the 9th Canadian Screen Awards in 2021.

== Episodes ==
=== Season 1 ===
No. overall	No. in season	Title	Directed by	Written by	Original release date
1	1	"Wheelchair Users"	Mariane McGraw	Unknown	TBA
2	2	"Tourette Syndrome"	Mariane McGraw	Unknown	TBA
3	3	"Visual Impairment"	Mariane McGraw	Unknown	TBA
4	4	"Autism"	Mariane McGraw	Unknown	TBA
5	5	"Limb Differences"	Mariane McGraw	Unknown	TBA
6	6	"Little People"	Mariane McGraw	Unknown	TBA
7	7	"Down Syndrome"	Mariane McGraw	Unknown	TBA
8	8	"Facial Differences"	Mariane McGraw	Unknown	TBA

=== Season 2 ===
No. overall	No. in season	Title	Directed by	Written by	Original release date
9	1	"Growing Up with a Disability"	Mariane McGraw	Unknown	TBA
10	2	"Post-Traumatic Stress Disorder"	Mariane McGraw	Unknown	TBA
11	3	"Deaf"	Mariane McGraw	Unknown	TBA
12	4	"Schizophrenia"	Mariane McGraw	Unknown	TBA
13	5	"Multiple Sclerosis"	Mariane McGraw	Unknown	TBA
14	6	"Bipolar Disorder"	Mariane McGraw	Unknown	TBA
15	7	"Parkinson's"	Mariane McGraw	Unknown	TBA
16	8	"Generalized Anxiety Disorder"	Mariane McGraw	Unknown	TBA

=== Season 3 ===
No. overall	No. in season	Title	Directed by	Written by	Original release date
17	1	"Memory Loss"	Mariane McGraw	Patty "Spark" Keach	TBA
18	2	"Burn Survivors"	Mariane McGraw	Patty "Spark" Keach	TBA
19	3	"Growing up with a Disabled Parent"	Mariane McGraw	Patty "Spark" Keach	TBA
20	4	"Depression"	Mariane McGraw	Patty "Spark" Keach	TBA
21	5	"Service and Guide Dog Users"	Mariane McGraw	Patty "Spark" Keach	TBA
22	6	"Parents of a Child with a Disability"	Mariane McGraw	Patty "Spark" Keach	TBA
23	7	"Brain Injuries"	Mariane McGraw	Patty "Spark" Keach	TBA
24	8	"Chronic Pain"	Mariane McGraw	Patty "Spark" Keach	TBA
