= Don Featherstone (filmmaker) =

Australian film director

Don Featherstone is an Australian filmmaker. His work includes documentaries about significant figures in Australian arts and culture, including authors David Malouf and Tim Winton, artist Brett Whiteley and dancer Robert Helpmann. Featherstone's works address social and historical issues such as beach culture, The Beach, gangs, The One Percenters about the Milperra Massacre, and war, Kokoda.

Featherstone's satirical mockumentary for television, BabaKiueria, has been the subject of academic comparative analysis of imperial historicity and postcolonial social progress. It has also been included in cultural exchanges, for example in "Southern Exposure" between the Museum of Contemporary Art, Sydney and the Museum Of Contemporary Art, San Diego.

In 1985 Featherstone co-founded Featherstone Productions with Judy Featherstone.

Featherstone's works have been screened and broadcast internationally, in many countries.

Other filmmakers utilise Featherstone's work, for example James Bogle's Whiteley.

== Filmography ==
Selected works include:

- Food for Thought (1977); writer, director
- Hey Look That's Me (1978);director
- William Cobbett's Rural Rides (1979); director;
- Erte (1979); director;
- The London Programme (1979-1982); director
- The South Bank Show (1982-1985); director
- Ed McBain (1982); director
- Jack Lemmon (1982); director
- John Le Carre (1983); director
- Msistlav Rostropovich (1983); director
- Barry Flanagan (1983); director
- David Hockney (1983); director
- Ivo Pogorelich (1984); director
- Robert Lowell (1984); director
- Alan Bleasedale (1985); director
- The Science of Winning (1985); director
- Arthur Boyd: Figures in the Landscape (1985); director, producer Featherstone Productions; Sydney
- Babakiueria (1986); director
- Heal or Hoax (1986); director
- Aussies (1987); director
- Beautiful Lies: A Film About Peter Carey (1986); producer, co-writer, director; Featherstone Productions; Sydney
- Dreamtime, Machinetime 1987; director, producer, writer Featherstone Productions; Sydney
- Slow Boat from Surabaya (1988); director
- Creative Spirits (1989) (Note: 2 episodes); producer, director Featherstone Productions; Sydney
- Difficult Pleasure: A Portrait of Brett Whiteley (1989) producer, director
- Astonish Me, Graeme Murphy (1989); producer
- There's No Time, Peter Sculthorpe (1989); producer
- The Wizard From Oz, James Morrison (1989); producer
- God or Politics', Tom Keneally (1989); producer, director
- The Peoples' Diva', Joan Carden (1989); producer
- Tales of Helpmann (1990); co-producer, director Primetime, Featherstone Productions; Sydney
- Billy Tea and Goulash (1991); director
- The Daylight Moon: A Portrait of the Poet Les Murray (1991); producer, writer, director Featherstone Productions; Sydney
- Fast Forward Exposed (1992); director
- Masterpiece (1992); co-producer, director; SBS, Featherstone Productions; Sydney
- Oondamooroo: Ernie Dingo (1992); director, co-producer
- Eric Rolls: Celebration of the Senses (1992); director, co-producer
- Make It New: Robert Klippel (1992); director, co-producer
- Right Said Fred: Fred Schepisi - Film Director (1993); director, co-producer
- Creative Spirits II (1993) (Note: 1 episode); director, producer Featherstone Productions; Sydney
- Lowering the Tone: 45 Years of Robyn Archer (1993); director, producer
- Bon Bons and Roses for Dorothy: Dorothy Hewett 1993; producer
- Dead Quick: Peter Corris 1993; producer
- Lighting Fires: Tim Storrier 1993; producer
- Creative Spirits III (1995); producer (Note: series), director (Note: 1 episode) Featherstone Productions; Sydney
- Tall Tales but True: David Williamson (1994); director, producer
- Smart's Labyrinth: Jeffrey Smart (1994); producer
- The Black Swan: Meryl Tankard Choreographer (1995); producer
- Wrestling The Angel: Blanche D'Alpuget (1995); director, writer, producer
- Dance of Nature: The Music of Ross Edwards (1995); producer, director, writer Featherstone Productions; Sydney
- Young Australian of the Year (1996); writer, director Featherstone Productions; Sydney
- An Imaginary Life: David Malouf: The Inner World of an Extraordinary Writer (1997); writer, director; Linfield, Sydney, AU; Film Australia RM Associates, ABC Television
- The Edge of the World: Tim Winton: Writer (1998); producer; Linfield, Sydney, AU; Film Australia RM Associates, ABC Television
- Art Zone (1998); writer, director
- The Maitland Wonder: Les Darcy (1998); director
- American Journeys (1999); writer, director
- I Witness: The Art of George Gittoes (1999); director, writer, producer Featherstone Productions; Sydney
- It Happened on Holiday (2000); writer, director
- The Beach (2000); coproducer, co-writer, director Centre Coast, Featherstone Productions; Sydney
- Sydney Revealed (2001); writer, director
- Australia Revealed (2002); writer, director
- The One Percenters (2005); writer, director
- Kokoda (2009); writer, director
- Singapore 1942 (2010); writer, director
- The War That Changed Us (2014); writer, co-director
- 100 Days to Victory (2018); writer, co-director

== Awards and recognition ==
Film awards and recognition include:

| Year | Category | Competition | Work | Status | Ref |
|---|---|---|---|---|---|
| 2019 | Best Sound in a documentary | AACTA Awards | 100 Days to Victory | Won | |
| 2019 | Best Docu Drama | ATOM Awards | 100 Days to Victory | Nominated | |
| 2019 | Best History Documentary | Canadian Screen Awards | 100 Days to Victory | Nominated | |
| 2014 | Best Docu Drama | ATOM Awards | The War That Changed Us | Won | |
| 2014 | Most Outstanding Factual Program | Logie Awards | The War That Changed Us | Nominated | |
| 2012 | Best Documentary Series | AACTA Awards | Singapore 1942 | Nominated | |
| 2012 | Gold - Dramatised Documentaries | South Australia & Western Australia ACS Awards | Singapore 1942 series - episode 2: End of the Empire | Won | |
| 2012 | Best Direction | Asian Television Awards | Singapore 1942 | Nominated | |
| 2012 | Best Editing | Asian Television Awards | Singapore 1942 | Nominated | |
| 2011 | Best History Production | History Makers Awards New York | Kokoda | Nominated | |
| 2010 | Best Documentary Series | AFI Awards | Kokoda series | Nominated | |
| 2010 | Best Documentary Sound | AFI Awards | Kokoda series - episode 1: The Invasion | Nominated | |
| 2010 | Best Documentary History, Social & Political Issues | ATOM Awards | Kokoda series | Finalist | |
| 2002 | Outstanding Achievement Award | IECF Hi-def Festival Tokyo | The Beach | Won | |
| 1998 | Best International Documentary | Hot Docs Festival in Toronto | An Imaginary Life: David Malouf: The Inner World of an Extraordinary Writer | Won | |
| 1998 | Best Arts Documentary | San Francisco Film & TV Festival | An Imaginary Life: David Malouf: The Inner World of an Extraordinary Writer | Won | |
| 1998 | Best Arts Documentary | Festival International du Film sur l'Art - Montreal | An Imaginary Life: David Malouf: The Inner World of an Extraordinary Writer | Finalist | |
| 1998 | Best Original Score in a documentary | Australian Composers Guild | An Imaginary Life: David Malouf: The Inner World of an Extraordinary Writer | Won | |
| 1997 | Best Arts Documentary | Banff International TV Festival | An Imaginary Life: David Malouf: The Inner World of an Extraordinary Writer | Finalist | |
| 1997 | | Greater Union Dendy Awards | An Imaginary Life: David Malouf: The Inner World of an Extraordinary Writer | Finalist | |
| 1997 | | New York Film & TV Festival | An Imaginary Life: David Malouf: The Inner World of an Extraordinary Writer | Finalist | |
| 1997 | Best Arts Documentary | Festival International du Film sur l'Art - Montreal | Ross Edwards | Finalist | |
| 1996 | Best Arts Documentary | Banff International TV Festival | Ross Edwards | Finalist | |
| 1996 | | IMZ Dance Screen Festival | Meryl Tankard | Finalist | |
| 1996 | Best Film | Grand Prix Video Dance Paris | Meryl Tankard | Won | |
| 1995 | Best film | Dance on Camera Film Festival, New York | Meryl Tankard | Won | |
| 1994 | Best Television Documentary | AFI Awards | Creative Spirits 2 series - episode: Lowering the Tone: 45 Years of Robyn Archer | Nominated | |
| 1993 | Best Arts Documentary | Festival International du Film sur l'Art-Montreal | The Daylight moon: A portrait of the poet Les Murray | Won | |
| 1992 | Awgies Award | | The Daylight moon: A portrait of the poet Les Murray | Nominated | |
| 1991 | Gold Plaque Award | Chicago International Film Festival | The Daylight moon: A portrait of the poet Les Murray | Won | |
| 1991 | | New York Film & TV Festival | The Daylight moon: A portrait of the poet Les Murray | Finalist | |
| 1991 | United Nations Media Peace Prize | | Billy Tea and Goulash | Nominated | |
| 1990 | International Emmy | New York | Robert Helpmann | Nominated | |
| 1990 | Gold Hugo Award | Chicago Film Festival | Difficult Pleasure: A portrait of Brett Whiteley | Won | |
| 1990 | Best Arts documentary | Banff Television Festival | Difficult Pleasure: A portrait of Brett Whiteley | Won | |
| 1990 | Best Television Documentary | AFI Awards | Difficult Pleasure: A portrait of Brett Whiteley | Nominated | |
| 1990 | Best Television Documentary | AFI Awards | Astonish Me, Graeme Murphy | Nominated | |
| 1989 | Best Arts Documentary | Banff Television Festival | Tom Keneally | Selected | |
| 1988 | Best Documentary | ATOM Awards | Peter Carey | Won | |
| 1986 | United Nations Media Peace Prize | | BabaKuieria | Won | |
| 1996 | | New York Film & TV Festival | Arthur Boyd | Finalist | |
| 1985 | Special Jury Prize | San Francisco Film Festival | Ed McBain | Won | |
| 1985 | Silver Award | New York Film & TV Festival | Ed McBain | Won | |
| 1983 | Best Arts Documentary | BAFTA Award | David Hockney | Nominated | |
| 1983 | Silver Award | New York Film & TV Festival | John LeCarré | Won | |
| 1982 | Silver Award | New York Film & TV Festival | King Cone | Won | |
