= Hannah Diviney =

Australian actress

- Occupation: Actress
- Notable work: Audrey

Hannah Diviney is an Australian actress, activist, and author.

Diviney plays Norah in the 2024 black comedy Audrey. For that role she was nominated for the AACTA Award for Best Supporting Actress in Film at the 14th AACTA Awards. She was previously the lead in the SBS dramedy Latecomers.

Diviney, who has cerebral palsy, is a disability advocate. She has campaigned for a disabled Disney princess and for Lizzo to remove an ableist slur from her Grrrls song.

Diviney published her debut book, I'll Let Myself In: Breaking Down Doors, in 2023. It is an autobiography telling her story of growing up with a disability.
