= You Can't Ask That =

Australian documentary TV program

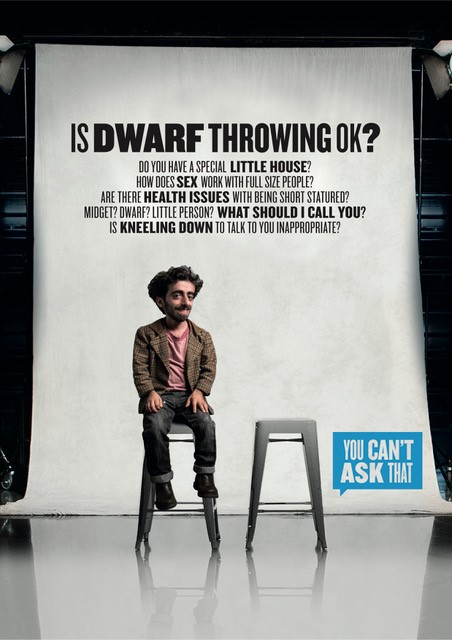
- Screenshot from the first episode
- Directed by: Kirk Docker; Aaron Smith
- Opening theme: Soul Searching by Amourouge
- Country of origin: Australia
- Original language: English
- No. of seasons: 7
- No. of episodes: 61

Production
- Executive producer: Lou Porter (2016-18) Frances O'Riordan (2018-present)
- Producers: Kirk Docker; Aaron Smith
- Production location: Australia
- Cinematography: Aaron Smith
- Editor: Nick McDougall
- Running time: 15-28 minutes
- Production company: ABC

Original release
- Network: ABC iview
- Release: 3 August 2016 – present

Related
- I Was Actually There

You Can't Ask That is an Australian TV series created by ABC Television that first went to air in August 2016. As of June 2022 its seventh season is on air in Australia.

The series took a hiatus in 2023, but is expected to return beyond that. In March 2026, the series was renewed for an eighth season.

== History ==
The series was created by Kirk Docker, Aaron Smith and Jon Casimir in 2015, as a spin-off from Hungry Beast. The first episode of the first season aired on ABC TV on 3 August 2016, as well as on iview.

Its seventh season started airing in May 2022 in Australia.

== Description ==
The show aims to offer insight into the lives of marginalised communities and break down stereotypes while answering the questions people are afraid to ask, reportedly inspired by Ask Me Anything (AMA) threads on Reddit. Each episode asks controversial questions sourced from the public to a minority Australian population, with the first series including indigenous people, people of short stature, Muslims, sex workers, transgender people and more. Several representative organisations were credited in the series including Short Statured People of Australia, Scarlet Alliance, Alzheimer's Australia and Exit International, as well as The Karuna Hospice Service and Palliative Care NSW.

== Season overview ==
On 28 September 2016, the ABC announced the series had been renewed for a second season. On 25 October 2017, the ABC announced the series had been renewed for a third season.

Season	Episodes	Originally aired	
Season	Episodes	Season premiere	Season finale
1	10	3 August 2016	5 October 2016
2	12	6 April 2017	21 July 2017
3	8	11 July 2018	29 August 2018
4	8	3 April 2019	22 May 2019
5	8	18 March 2020	6 May 2020
6	8	28 April 2021	16 June 2021
7	8	25 May 2022	6 July 2022

== Episodes ==
=== Season 1 (2016) ===
No. in series	No. in season	Title	Original airdate
1	1	"Short Statured"	3 August 2016
2	2	"Wheelchair Users"	10 August 2016
3	3	"Transgender"	17 August 2016
4	4	"Muslims"	24 August 2016
5	5	"Polyamorous"	31 August 2016
6	6	"Ex-prisoners"	7 September 2016
7	7	"Fat"	14 September 2016
8	8	"Indigenous"	21 September 2016
9	9	"Sex Workers"	27 September 2016
10	10	"Terminally Ill"	5 October 2016

=== Season 2 (2017) ===
No. in series	No. in season	Title	Original airdate
11	1	"Blind People"	6 April 2017
12	2	"Down Syndrome"	12 April 2017
13	3	"Suicide Attempt Survivors"	19 April 2017
14	4	"Recent War Veterans"	26 April 2017
15	5	"Facial Difference"	3 May 2017
16	6	"Refugees"	10 May 2017
17	7	"Ice Users"	17 May 2017
18	8	"Children of Same-Sex Parents"	24 May 2017
19	9	"Centenarians"	31 May 2017
20	10	"S&M"	7 July 2017
21	11	"Gambling Addicts"	14 July 2017
22	12	"Homeless"	21 July 2017

=== Season 3 (2018) ===
No. in series	No. in season	Title	Original airdate
23	1	"Survivors of Sexual Assault"	11 July 2018
24	2	"Ex-Reality TV Stars"	18 July 2018
25	3	"Former Cult Members"	25 July 2018
26	4	"Eating Disorders"	1 August 2018
27	5	"Swingers"	8 August 2018
28	6	"Schizophrenia"	15 August 2018
29	7	"Drag"	22 August 2018
30	8	"Priests"	29 August 2018

=== Season 4 (2019) ===
No. in series	No. in season	Title	Original airdate
31	1	"Domestic and Family Violence"	3 April 2019
32	2	"African Australians"	10 April 2019
33	3	"Intersex"	17 April 2019
34	4	"Carnies and Show People"	24 April 2019
35	5	"Ex-Politicians"	1 May 2019
36	6	"Alcoholics"	8 May 2019
37	7	"Deaf"	15 May 2019
38	8	"Disaster Survivors"	22 May 2019

=== Season 5 (2020) ===
No. in series	No. in season	Title	Original airdate
39	1	"Firefighters"	18 March 2020
40	2	"Nudists"	25 March 2020
41	3	"Killed Someone"	1 April 2020
42	4	"Autism Spectrum"	8 April 2020
43	5	"HIV-positive people"	15 April 2020
44	6	"Olympic & Paralympic Gold Medallists"	22 April 2020
45	7	"Public Housing"	29 April 2020
46	8	"Kids"	6 May 2020

=== Season 6 (2021) ===
No. in series	No. in season	Title	Original airdate
47	1	"Cheaters"	28 April 2021
48	2	"Ex-Football players"	5 May 2021
49	3	"Obsessive Compulsive Disorder"	12 May 2021
50	4	"Amputees"	19 May 2021
51	5	"Families of Missing Persons"	26 May 2021
52	6	"Lesbians"	2 June 2021
53	7	"Chinese Australians"	9 June 2021
54	8	"Adult Virgins"	16 June 2021

=== Season 7 (2022) ===
No. in series	No. in season	Title	Original airdate
55	1	"Bogans"	25 May 2022
56	2	"Postnatal Depression"	1 June 2022
57	3	"Gay Men"	8 June 2022
58	4	"Models"	15 June 2022
59	5	"Prescription Drug Addiction"	22 June 2022
60	6	"Porn Stars"	29 June 2022
61	7	"Dementia"	6 July 2022

=== Season 8 (2026) ===
The series is set to return in 2026 with topics including; Scammed, Kids of Celebrities, Heroin, Modern Slaves, AI Relationships, Voluntary Assisted Dying (VAD), Kinks, Teen Mums, Accidental Heroes, Survivors of War, Indian Australians, Really Tall.

== Awards and recognition ==
You Can't Ask That won the Rose d'Or for Best Reality or Factual Entertainment in 2017. It also won 3 UN Media Awards for Promotion of Disability Rights and Issues, Promotion of Social Cohesion and Promotion of Empowerment of Older People. In 2018 it was nominated for a Logie for Most Outstanding Factual or Documentary Program.

== International versions ==
In July 2017, Kan 11 in Israel began broadcasting a local version of the series under the name "סליחה על השאלה" (Slicha Al HaShe'ela, Excuse me for asking), with total of 98 episodes in 8 seasons (2 of which are in Arabic, and 3 are for kids).

In February 2019, Dutch broadcaster BNNVARA started broadcasting a local version on public broadcasting channel NPO 3 under the title "Ik durf het bijna niet te vragen" (I hardly dare to ask).

In June 2019, CBC Television in Canada released a local version of the series titled You Can't Ask That with eight episodes.

An Arabic language version called "بلا مؤاخذة" (bila muakhadha, No Blame) began airing on 21 September 2019 on the Kan 11's sister channel Makan 33.

In April 2020, Kan Educational in Israel began broadcasting a local version of the series for kids under the name " סליחה על השאלה ילדים" (Slicha Al HaShe'ela Yeladim, Excuse me for asking kids).

In October 2020, a U.S. version of the series was picked up by Current Flow Entertainment. Remake rights were acquired for both English and Spanish language versions.
