= Midnight Oil: The Hardest Line =

2024 documentary film

- Directed by: Paul Clarke
- Written by: Paul Clarke
- Produced by: Carolina Sorensen
- Cinematography: Kevin Scott
- Edited by: Gretchen Peterson
- Release date: 2024
- Running time: 105 minutes
- Country: Australia
- Language: English

Midnight Oil: The Hardest Line is a 2024 Australian documentary written and directed by Paul Clarke. It explores the career of the rock band Midnight Oil.

== Reception ==
On review aggregator Rotten Tomatoes, the film has an approval rating of 100% based on 7 reviews.

Stephen Romei of the Australian gave it 3 stars and wrote "At times this authorised documentary, in which all the band members are interviewed, tips towards hagiography." The Sydney Morning Herald's Sandra Hall gave it 4 stars. The Herald Sun's Leigh Paatsch gave it 4 stars. He finishes "Overall, The Hardest Line crafts a fitting tribute to one of the great Australian cultural warriors of all-time, a bloody-minded bunch who stood their ground, made their noise and made a difference." John McDonald of the Australian Financial Review notes "Clarke’s documentary is largely a celebration of the Oils. It reveals a few rocky patches, but never ventures a word of criticism." The Canberra Times' Glen Humphries says it is "a really impressive documentary that manages to compress the band's 40-odd year career into 100 minutes."

== Awards ==
- 14th AACTA Awards
  - Best Editing in a Documentary - Gretchen Peterson - won
  - Best Sound in a Documentary - Wayne Pashley, Travis Handley, Stephen Hopes, Jason King - nominated
  - Best Documentary - Paul Clarke, Carolina Sorensen, Mikael Borglund, Martin Fabinyi - nominated
