= Latecomers =

Australian comedy television miniseries

- Genre: Comedy
- Created by: Emma Myers; Nina Oyama; Angus Thompson
- Written by: Emma Myers; Nina Oyama
- Directed by: Alistair Baldwin; Madeleine Gottlieb
- Starring: Angus Thompson; Hannah Diviney; Miriama Smith; Patrick Jhanur
- Composer: Lance Gurisik
- Country of origin: Australia
- Original language: English
- No. of series: 1
- No. of episodes: 5

Production
- Executive producers: Loani Arman; Donna Chang
- Producers: Liam Heyen; Hannah Ngo
- Cinematography: Grégoire Lière
- Running time: 10 minutes

Original release
- Release: 3 December 2023

Latecomers is an Australian comedy television series. It was created by Angus Thompson, Emma Myers and Nina Oyama and stars Thompson and Hannah Diviney. It is a rom-com featuring two disabled lead characters. It was released by SBS On Demand in December 2023. Anna Hickey-Moody, writing in the Conversation praised it for having actors with a disability playing characters with a disability.

== Cast ==
- Angus Thompson as Frank
- Hannah Diviney as Sarah
- Miriama Smith as Brandi
- Patrick Jhanur as Elliot
- Tracy Mann as Deb
- Liam Greinke as Troy
- Tom Wilson as Jackson

== Awards ==
- 13th AACTA Awards
  - Best Online Drama or Comedy - Liam Heyen, Hannah Ngo, Angus Thompson, Emma Myers, Nina Oyama, Madeleine Gottlieb, Alistair Baldwin - Won
