= Whiteley (film) =

2017 documentary film

- Directed by: James Bogle
- Written by: James Bogle; Victor Gentile
- Produced by: Sue Clothier
- Cinematography: Jim Frater
- Edited by: Lawrie Silvestrin
- Music by: Ash Gibson Greig
- Release date: 2017
- Running time: 90 minutes
- Country: Australia
- Language: English

Whiteley is a 2017 Australian documentary directed by James Bogle and produced by Sue Clothier. It explores the life of painter Brett Whiteley, from his birth in Sydney to his death alone in a motel room. It uses collage, montage and re-enactments, using personal photo albums, archival material, press clippings, letters and footage from Don Featherstone's Difficult Pleasure documentary on Whiteley.

== Reception ==
On review aggregator Rotten Tomatoes, the film has an approval rating of 100% based on 8 reviews.

Stephen Romei of the Australian gave it 3 stars and wrote "The weakest artistic aspect of the filling-in comes with the use of actors playing Brett and Wendy in re-creations of their life together, and in animated scenes that put photographs of Whiteley into Renaissance paintings and elsewhere." The Sydney Morning Herald's Sandra Hall gave it 3 1/2 stars saying "Whiteley dominates the action, talking about the alchemy which translates ideas into art, and the result is an absorbing portrait, marred only by Bogle's decision to use actors in a series of dramatic reconstructions. They're awkwardly at odds with the far more compelling sequences showing the real Whiteleys. And they're all the more irritating because the rest is so good." The Herald Sun's Leigh Paatsch gave it 4 1/2 stars. He states "Director James Bogle uses a basic, no-frills approach, wisely surmising that Whiteley’s spellbinding visual gift will speak for itself. What emerges from the film — which uses audio recordings of the artist himself and those close to him as a refreshingly direct form of narration — are contrasting portraits of the same individual."

== Awards ==
- 7th AACTA Awards
  - Best Direction in a Documentary - James Bogle - won
  - Best Editing in a Documentary - Lawrie Silvestrin - won
  - Best Sound in a Documentary - Ric Curtin, John Simpson, Lawrie Silvestrin - won
  - Best Original Music Score in a Documentary - Ash Gibson Greig - won
  - Best Feature Length Documentary - Sue Clothier, James Bogle, Peta Ayers - nominated
