= Bobuq Sayed =

Writer in the Afghan diaspora

- Education: University of Miami; San Jose State University
- Occupations: Writer, poet, theatre-maker

Bobuq Sayed is an Afghan-Australian writer, poet and theatre-maker, who is the author of A Brief History of Australian Terror. It was named by ABC News as a best new book of 2024. Their novel No God But Us was published in 2026.

== Life and education ==
Sayed was born in Australia to Afghan parents. They are non-binary. They have a Master of Fine Arts from the University of Miami.

== Career ==
Sayed wrote an article in 2017 entitled "Literary Production Versus Institutional Whiteness", which challenges structural racism within Australian literary communities. In 2018, Sayed was a member of the theatre collective Embittered Swish, the group worked to expand the concept of trans dramaturgy, including moving away from work related to transition or dysphoria. Sayed's work also featured in the 2018 exhibition The Third Muslim: Queer and Trans* Muslim Narratives of Resistance and Resilience held at SOMArts in San Francisco.

They are also a former editor of Archer magazine. In 2021, they co-organised a fundraiser to supply financial aid to LGBTQ+ Afghans in Afghanistan. Sayed co-edited Nothing to Hide: Voices of Trans and Gender Diverse Australia alongside Sam Elkin, Alex Gallagher and Yves Rees. They were a 2022–23 Steinbeck Fellow at San Jose State University. In 2024 they published A Brief History of Australian Terror, which was recommended by ABC News as a best new book of 2024. Academic David Coady reviewed the work as an "excellent contribution to an important topic," whilst suggesting that the work leaves some things unsaid, like the conflation of Zionism with anti-Semitism in Western media. They are a Kundiman Fellow. Their first novel No God But Us was published in 2026.
