= Audrey (2024 film) =

Film by Natalie Bailey

- Theatrical release poster
- Directed by: Natalie Bailey
- Screenplay by: Lou Sanz
- Produced by: Michael Wrenn; Dan Lake; Shannon Wilson-McClinton; Diya Eid
- Starring: Jackie van Beek; Jeremy Lindsay Taylor; Josephine Blazier; Hannah Diviney; Aaron Fa'aoso
- Cinematography: Simon Ozolins
- Edited by: Katrina Barker
- Music by: Alex Cameron
- Production companies: Invisible Republic; Orange Entertainment
- Distributed by: Rialto Distribution
- Release dates: 10 March 2024 (SXSW); 7 November 2024
- Running time: 96 minutes
- Country: Australia
- Language: English
- Box office: US$69,696

Audrey is a 2024 Australian black comedy film directed by Natalie Bailey and written by Lou Sanz. It stars Jackie van Beek, Jeremy Lindsay Taylor, Josephine Blazier, Hannah Diviney, and Aaron Fa'aoso. It was released in Australia on 7 November 2024.

== Premise ==
Ronnie Lipsick finds herself trapped in a life she never wanted—her career is off track, her husband has lost his spark, and she struggles to connect with her two daughters. After an accident leaves her eldest daughter, Audrey, in a coma, Ronnie takes the chance to "reinvent" herself by stealing Audrey's identity. However, she soon discovers she is not the only opportunist in the family wanting to exploit Audrey's condition.

== Cast ==
- Jackie van Beek as Ronnie Lipsick
- Jeremy Lindsay Taylor as Cormack Lipsick
- Josephine Blazier as Audrey Lipsick
- Hannah Diviney as Nora
- Aaron Fa'aoso as Bourke
- Fraser Anderson as Max
- Gael Ballantyne as Lucinda
- Jeanda St James as Irene
- Tiare Brooks as Andy
- Darren Gilshenan as Physio

== Production ==
The film was directed by Natalie Bailey and written by Lou Sanz. Principal photography took place in early 2023 in Gold Coast, Queensland. Audrey was part of Screen Australia's nine projects it funded in 2023, totalling a combine production A$7.4 million. The film was also financed by Screen Queensland, with support from the Melbourne International Film Festival Premiere Fund.

== Release ==
Audrey had its world premiere at South by Southwest on 10 March 2024. The film had its Australian premiere at the Melbourne International Film Festival on 16 August 2024, and a European premiere at the BFI London Film Festival on 15 October 2024.

It was released in Australia and New Zealand cinemas by Rialto Distribution on 7 November 2024. It later screened at the Palm Springs International Film Festival on 5 January 2025. It was scheduled to be released in the UK and Ireland by Vertigo Releasing on 17 March 2025. Sunrise Films set a release date of 1 April 2025 for the US.

== Reception ==
On the review aggregator website Rotten Tomatoes, 83% of 12 critics' reviews are positive, with an average rating of 6.9/10.

The Guardian called it a "deliciously snarky black comedy".
