= Olly Bowman =

Australian internet personality and musician (born 2000)

Oliver Bowman (born 2000), also known by his stage name of Mr Melk, is an Australian internet personality and musician. His song "Fredag (Digg å være norsk)" in Norwegian was released by Sony Music Norway, and was certified gold in Norway by IFPI Norge, peaking at number nine on the Norwegian music charts. He was nominated for an AACTA Audience Choice Award for Favourite Australian Digital Creator at the 14th AACTA Awards.
