= You'll Never Find Me (film) =

Australian horror-thriller film

- Official release poster
- Directed by: Indianna Bell; Josiah Allen
- Written by: Indianna Bell
- Produced by: Indianna Bell; Josiah Allen; Jordan Cowan; Christine Williams
- Starring: Brendan Rock; Jordan Cowan
- Music by: Darren Lim
- Distributed by: Blue Finch Films; Umbrella Entertainment; Shudder
- Release date: 2023
- Running time: 99 minutes
- Country: Australia
- Language: English

You'll Never Find Me is a 2023 Australian psychological horror film directed by Indianna Bell and Josiah Allen in their directorial debut from a screenplay by Bell.

== Plot ==
An older man named Patrick listens to the radio alone in his caravan late at night. A flashback of a woman outside his car on a rainy day plays out, accompanied by the same music on the radio, the song "Sleepwalk". He stares at a vial containing a clear liquid and puts it away.

A storm approaches. Soon after there is a knock at his door, which he opens after some hesitation to find a young woman, soaking from the rain, seeking a ride to town. He invites her in, offering her a towel and tea, but she says she will not be staying long after he tells her his car is not working. She requests a phone call, but he ignores the request and instead gives her dry clothes. She says she came from the beach, which he finds questionable since that is some distance away. He hands her coins for a payphone, claiming not to have a mobile phone, and offers directions to it with the warning that she will not be able to reach it alone, since it sits outside a gate which is locked at this time of night. She reluctantly agrees to stay to wait for her clothes to dry.

As the two converse the woman finds a collection of objects belonging to women, including a locket containing hair. Asking where she is staying, the woman gives conflicting answers, causing Patrick to become suspicious. He offers her a shower to warm up, during which the woman notices dirt and blood going down the drain.

Patrick heats up a can of soup and offers her a jumper, claiming it was from his old girlfriend when the woman asks if he was married. He tells her that he doesn't sleep much anymore due to his age and how "his thoughts are leaking into his life". As he makes this statement he cleans the pan he heated the soup in; it begins to resemble blood.

The woman asks how she was able to get in if the gates were locked, which Patrick is also curious about. A sudden knock on the door occurs, but Patrick finds no one there. He explains that children in the caravan park enjoy taunting him by knocking on the door and running away. A power cut then occurs and they both go to check the fuse box. The woman uses a torch to light up the way and briefly sees blood on a hammer. She notices what appears to be bleeding scratch marks on his back and offers to get him something from the medicine cabinet to treat it, where she finds her earring in a pillbox among many others.

The woman gets alarmingly suspicious and demands to leave immediately. Patrick calmly tells her the door is not locked. She decides to stay in the van, and they play a game of Bullshit, as the storm is still raging on. Patrick admits to telling her a lie, which fits with the theme of the card game: he was married, having met his wife at a service station, where she had asked him to buy her a packet of chips, and telling the woman that his wife died of an overdose. While drinking, the woman finds lipstick on her glass, once again raising her suspicions. After a storm burst, Patrick heads outside. The woman hears a phone vibrating, which she finds in the previously unexplored back room, belonging to a dead woman under a sheet on the bed.

The woman tries to escape through the roof, hitting a skylight with the same previously seen hammer, which suddenly is once again covered in blood. She is caught by Patrick, who ties her up and drugs her with the vial containing GHB solution, passing out as she tries to fight him off. Patrick tells her about the first girl he killed, describing how she came to him in a storm at the beach asking for a ride, and how she had a memorable tattoo on her ribs. After the woman passes out he realizes she has that same tattoo, and has all along been the same woman. Terrified, he descends into a nightmarish scene in which he is confronted by all the women he has killed in the past, and hears the police relentlessly knocking on his door. He is suddenly pulled into darkness, in which he hears the sound of his father on a ventilator, referencing a story he told the woman earlier about his childhood. He emerges from the darkness covered in blood and distraught, and the woman forces him to empty the vial of GHB into the bottle of whiskey and drink it, as the other murdered girls cheer him on, leading him to overdose.

Patrick opens his eyes, revealing that there was no storm and that he was hallucinating everything, including the woman. Hearing knocking at the door he opens it to find children running away, having played a prank. He then reaches into his pocket revealing an empty vial of GHB. He laughs incredulously as he understands that in his delirium, he drank the solution, and goes back indoors. We cut to the outside of the caravan where we hear him collapse and die.

== Cast ==
- Brendan Rock as Patrick
- Jordan Cowan as The Visitor
- Elena Carapetis as Smoking Woman
- Angela Korng as Dead Woman
- Alina Truong, Aurelie Sowerbutts, Aileen Castro, Cheyenne Joy, Chloe Robinson, Jarminder Kang, Jasmine Garcia, Kelly Woodhall and Kirsty Johnson as The Women
- Finn Watson and Luca Trimboli as Caravan Park Kids

== Production ==
Filming took place in Adelaide.

== Release ==
In April 2023, Blue Finch Films acquired the distribution rights for the film outside Australia and New Zealand. Umbrella Entertainment holds the distribution rights in Australia and New Zealand. Shudder acquired the distribution rights for the film in North America, Ireland and the United Kingdom following its premiere at the 2023 Tribeca Festival. Shudder released the film on 22 March 2024.

== Reception ==
On the review aggregator website Rotten Tomatoes, 81% of 53 critics' reviews are positive, with an average rating of 6.9/10. The website's consensus reads: "Visually and sonically distinctive, You'll Never Find Me heightens its spooky atmosphere and claustrophobic setting with a story that'll keep viewers guessing." Metacritic, which uses a weighted average, assigned the film a score of 82 out of 100, based on 6 critics, indicating "universal acclaim".

Brian Tallerico of RogerEbert.com said the film "subverts the traditional paranoia of a thriller wherein a lost soul knocks on the wrong door... Bell and Allen expertly modulate the tension until the film explodes in a surreal, unexpected final act. It's a smart, well-made little thriller." Meagan Navarro of Bloody Disgusting gave it a score of 3.5/5 skulls, writing, "You'll Never Find Me... is a somber tale set on a dark and stormy night. But the filmmakers instead reclaim the quintessential setup to blend grim, contemporary horror with a classic haunted house aesthetic, resulting in a claustrophobic, oft-unsettling chamber piece." Screen Rant's Mae Abdulbaki said the film was "an intimate story, one that is carried by an intense ongoing exchange between two characters that will rattle your nerves and keep you on the edge of your seat until the very end", and gave it 4/5 stars.

United Press International's Fred Topel said the film "gets the most out of two characters in a single location. It's a scenario many minimalist horror films have accomplished and this film joins the pantheon." CityMag's Daniel Tune wrote, "Like many a low-budget thriller, the film's runtime is largely devoted to the low-simmering tension that grows out of this strange scenario, as the two loners, capably played by Brendan Rock and Jordan Cowan, gradually reveal their initially ambiguous motivations, guiding us towards a chaotic, kaleidoscopic climax."
