= Archer (magazine) =

Bi-monthly Australian magazine covering LGBT-interest topics

- Categories: Newsmagazine
- Frequency: Biannual
- Founded: 2013
- Company: Drummond Street Services
- Country: Australia
- Based in: Melbourne
- Language: English
- Website: archermagazine.com.au

Archer is an Australian print publication about sexuality, gender and identity. It is published twice-yearly in Melbourne, Australia. The magazine was founded by Amy Middleton, the founding publisher.

The magazine has covered taboo topics such as sex and ageing in 2015 and been the subject of controversy over editorial choices such as including a photo of an exposed nipple in 2017. One of its distributors deemed it "inappropriate for sale" and its founding editor, Middleton, speaks publicly about censorship and online abuse.

In 2016, Archer won a UN Media Peace Prize from the United Nations Association of Australia, for its depiction of older persons in the AGEING issue. In 2014, the magazine won the Media Award category in Australia's Honour Awards, an annual event that recognises achievements within or contributions to NSW's lesbian, gay, bisexual, transgender and intersex (LGBTI) community. It has also received the LGBTI Honour Award, a finalist place for Publishers Australia Magazine Launch of the Year, and a nomination for the UN Human Rights Medal. A former contributing editor is Bobuq Sayed.

In 2021, Archer was acquired by Drummond Street Services, a not-for-profit community service organisation with a focus on supporting LGBTIQA+ people experiencing hardship.

Archer has published 16 print editions since launching in 2013.

== See also ==
- List of LGBTQ periodicals
