= Nick Lacey =

Television & film producer (born 1996)

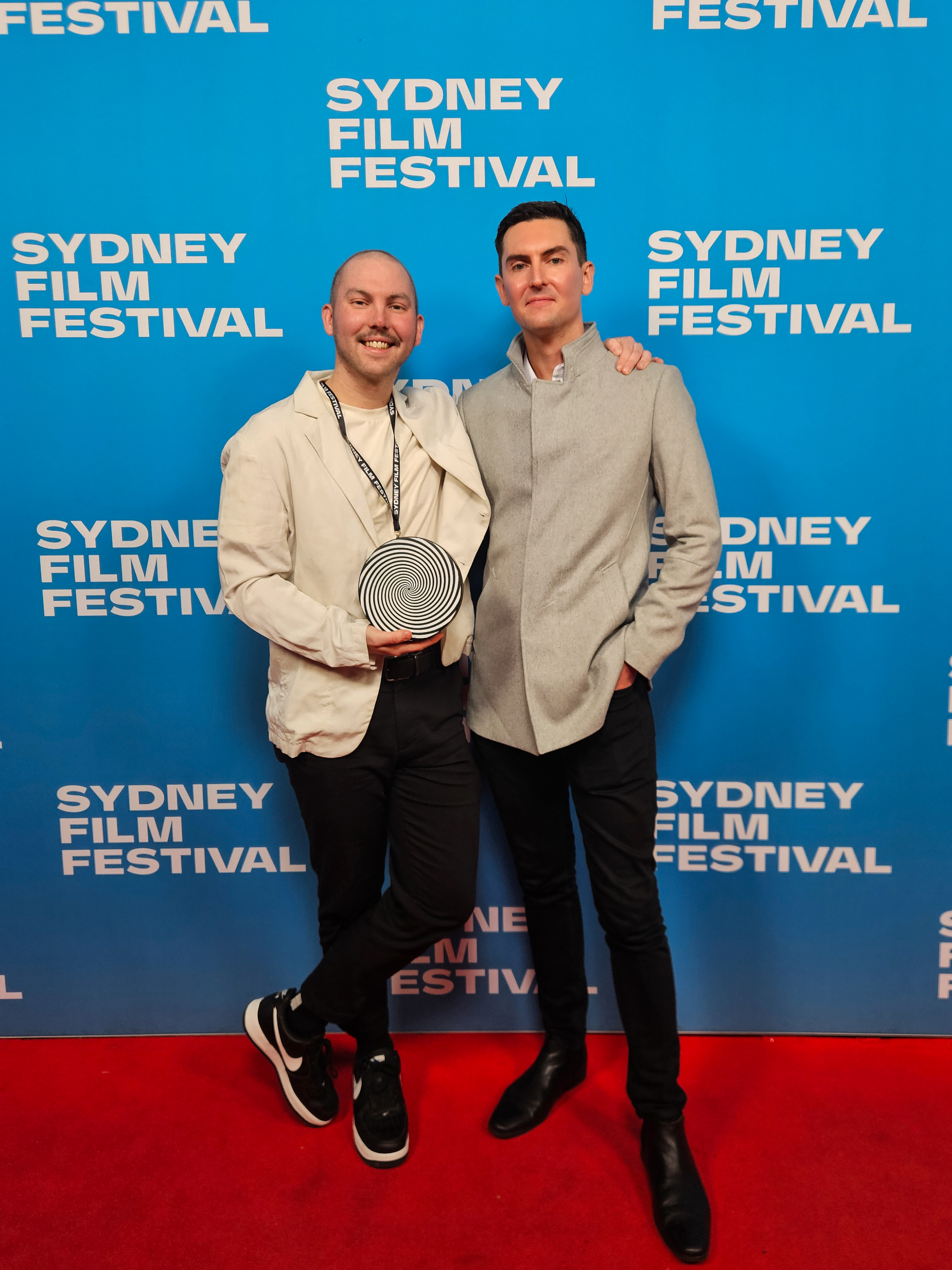
- Born: October 2, 1996 (age 29)
- Occupations: Film and television director, producer and cinematographer
- Years active: 2016-present
- Website: basedfilm.com

Nick Lacey is an AACTA award nominated Irish and Australian filmmaker, director, producer, and cinematographer.

== Early life and education ==
Lacey was born in Perth, Australia, and emigrated to Wexford, Ireland where he spent most of his childhood and teenage years. He finished his high schooling in Mandurah, Western Australia.

== Career ==
=== Television (2016-present) ===
In television, Lacey has produced, directed and shot a number of observational documentary, factual television and reality television series for companies such as Endemol Shine Australia., Blackfella Films, Paramount Australia and the Seven Network.

Lacey began his career working in the casting department of Endemol Shine Australia, working on major broadcast television series such as Australian Survivor, Married At First Sight and Family Food Fight before moving into production in 2018 on the first series of observational documentary Ambulance Australia, working as an associate producer, camera operator, and post associate producer on the series.

Lacey subsequently associate produced, shot, and associate post-produced observational series One Born Every Minute in 2019 for production company Endemol Shine Australia, associate story produced reality series First Dates season 04 for production company Warner Bros. Television Studios, and associate produced as well as shot House Rules Season 7 and House Rules Season 8 for the Seven Network.

In 2020-2021, Lacey associate produced, shot and associate post-produced the second series of the observational documentary Old People's Home for 4 Year Olds, broadcast on ABC Television and ABC iview.

He returned to produce and shoot the follow-up series to Old People's Home for 4 Year Olds in 2022, with the series Old People's Home for Teenagers. The series won the 2022 AACTA Award for Best Factual Entertainment Program, the Gold award in the New York Festivals TV and Film Awards, Social Issues Category and was nominated for a Rose d'Or in 2022 within the Reality and Factual Entertainment category.

In 2022 he directed and produced the comedy factual television series Gogglebox Australia Series 16, which was nominated for an AACTA Award for Best Factual Entertainment Program.

From 2022-2024 Lacey has produced and shot the observational documentary series Lost For Words season 2 for broadcaster SBS, directed and shot observational documentary series Meet The Neighbours produced by Blackfella Films and broadcast on SBS, and directed, produced and shot the factual television series Dogs Behaving Very Badly Australia for Paramount Australia

=== Film (2020-present) ===
Lacey has directed, produced and shot four films to date alongside his sibling and co-directing and producing partner, Nathan Lacey.

In 2020, Lacey directed and produced the short film Bareface, co-directed and produced with his sibling Nathan Lacey. It premiered in the Sydney Underground Film Festival in 2020.

In 2021, he directed and produced the short film The Suspect, co-directed and produced with his sibling Nathan Lacey. It premiered in the inaugural Sony Catchlight Film Festival in 2021.

In 2022, Lacey directed and produced the short film Ghosted, co-directed and produced with his sibling Nathan Lacey. The film had its world premiere at the 69th Sydney Film Festival, running in competition in the Dendy Awards for Australian Short Films category with the film receiving a special jury mention in judging. Ghosted was also officially selected for the 2022 Cinéfest Oz Film Festival, 2022 Melbourne Queer Film Festival, and won the Best Screenwriting Award in the 2023 Mardi Gras Film Festival within the My Queer Career category.

In 2024, he directed and produced the short film Die Bully Die co-directed and produced with his sibling Nathan Lacey. The film had its world premiere at the 71st Sydney Film Festival, running in competition in the Dendy Awards for Australian Short Films category. The film won the Dendy Award for Best Live Action Short at the festival. The film also the Fiction award at the 2024 Sony Catchlight Film Festival and was shortlisted for the Iris Prize in the 2024 edition of the Iris Prize Film Festival.

== Awards and nominations ==
Lacey was nominated for an Australian Academy of Television and Cinema Arts Award for Best Short Film for his film Die Bully Die.

In 2024 at the 71st Sydney Film Festival, he won the Dendy Award for Best Live Action Short for his film Die Bully Die granting Nick eligibility for an Academy Award for Best Live Action Short at the 97th Academy Awards.

In 2024 at the annual Sony Catchlight Film Festival, he won the Fiction Prize for best fiction short for his film Die Bully Die.

In 2024 at the 37th Out On Film Atlanta Film Festival, he won the Audience Award for best narrative short for his film Die Bully Die.

Lacey was shortlisted for the 2024 Iris Prize at the Iris Prize Film Festival for his film Die Bully Die.

Lacey received two honourable mentions in judging at the 2024 Belfast Film Festival in the Best Short Film as well as LUMI award categories for his film Die Bully Die.

Lacey was nominated for an Australian Directors Guild award for Best Direction of a Short Film for his film Die Bully Die.

Lacey won the Audience Choice Award for Best Short Film at the 2024 Melbourne Queer Film Festival as well as received a Judges Special Mention for his film Die Bully Die.

Lacey won the People's Choice Best International Short Award at the 2025 Vancouver Out On Screen Film Festival for his film Die Bully Die.

Lacey won the Best Short Film Award as well as the Audience Award for Best Short at the 2025 Queer Screen Mardi Gras Film Festival for his film Die Bully Die.

Lacey won the Audience Choice Award at the 2025 Stellar Short Film Festival for his film Die Bully Die.

In 2025 Lacey won the Audience Choice Award at the Roze Filmdagen Film Festival for his film Die Bully Die.

Lacey was nominated for the Dendy Live Action Short Award and the Rouben Mamoulian Award for Best Director within the 69th edition of the Sydney Film Festival for his short film Ghosted.

Series 2 of Old People's Home for 4 Year Olds won the 2021 Australian Academy of Cinema and Television Award for Best Documentary or Factual Program as well as the Australian Grand Award, Gold Award and Grand Award Winner in the New York Festivals TV and Film Awards Social Issues, Documentary Category.

In 2014 Lacey won the Bond University Television and Film Award for Best Editing Award, as well as the Dean's Choice Award for his short documentary Pursuit of Light.
