= Danny and Michael Philippou =

Australian filmmakers and YouTubers

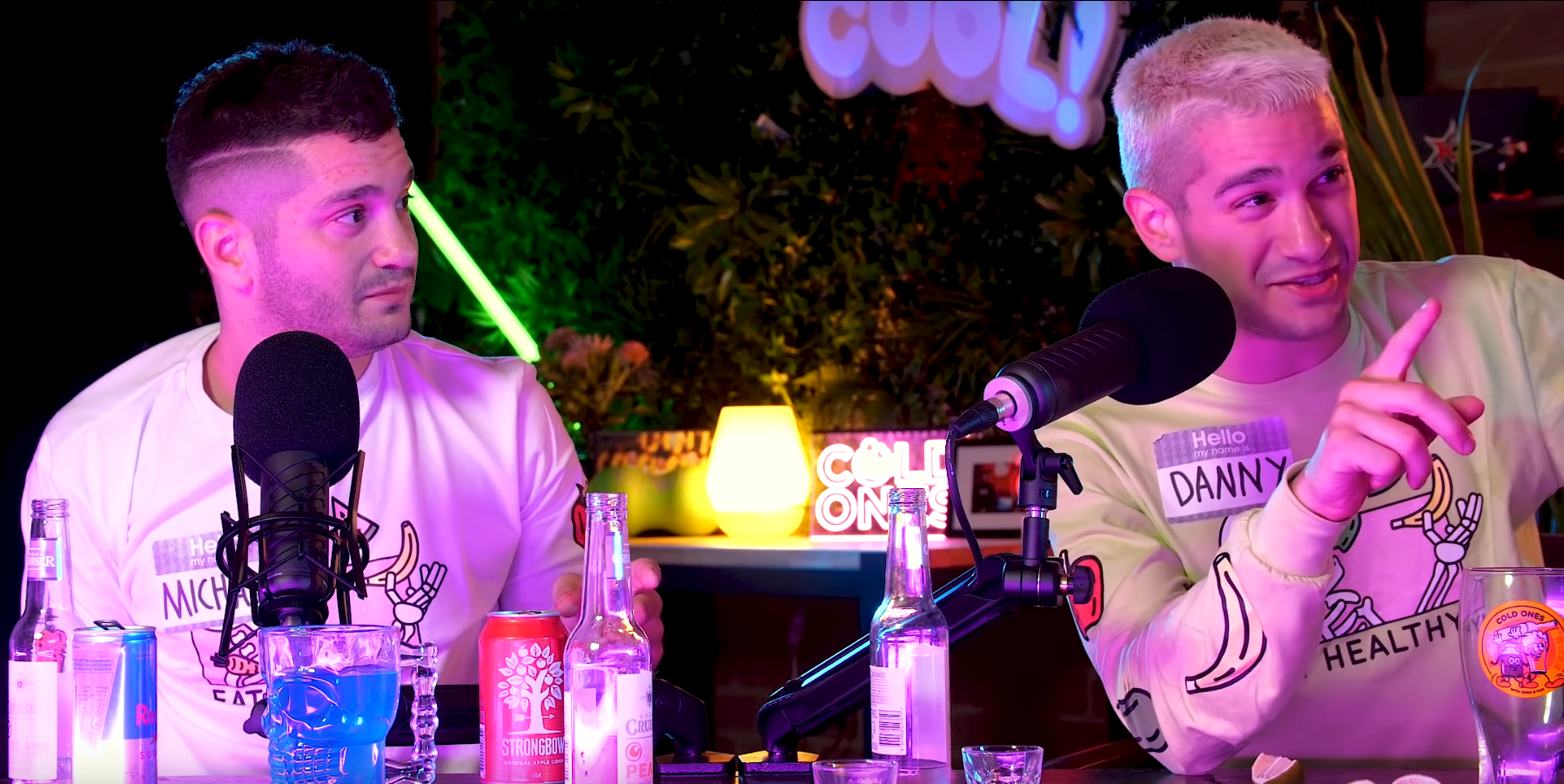
- Michael (left) and Danny in March 2020
- Born: Danny Philippou; Michael Philippou; 13 November 1992 (age 34); Adelaide, South Australia, Australia
- Occupations: Filmmakers; YouTubers; stunt performers

YouTube information
- Channel: RackaRacka
- Years active: 2013–present
- Genres: Comedy horror; surreal comedy; action comedy; sketch comedy; parody; Splatter film; psychological horror
- Subscribers: 6.96 million
- Views: 1.18 billion
- Last updated: 17 July 2026

Danny Philippou and Michael Philippou, known together online as RackaRacka, are an Australian twin sibling team of filmmakers, YouTubers, and stunt performers. They are best known for their comedy horror and parody videos on YouTube, and for directing the horror films Talk to Me (2022) and Bring Her Back (2025). They have won numerous awards for their work, including the Best International Channel Streamy Award, Best Overall at the Online Video Awards, and the AACTA Award for the Best Web Show. Originally from Adelaide with Greek heritage, the brothers moved to Los Angeles in January 2019, but continue making films in Australia, where they prefer the filmmaking culture.

== Early life ==
Danny and Michael Philippou were born on 13 November 1992 in Adelaide, South Australia, to a Greek Cypriot father and a Greek mother. They are of Greek descent.

Growing up in the northern suburb of Pooraka, Danny and Michael began filming backyard wrestling matches with their close friends in Adelaide at 11 years old. Inspired by WWE, the Philippou brothers' matches included them "crashing into furniture, "flipping kids over and bashing them headfirst into the ground and jumping off everything, including roofs". They also filmed in a half-built house and caused water to flood the site; Danny and Michael later admitted some of the things they did were extremely risky and even life-threatening, and were thankful that the elder sister of one of their friends helped steer them away from doing such things that could have taken them down a path of juvenile delinquency. At the age of 13, the Philippou brothers moved on to making a "TV show" and "movies".

== YouTube career ==
In 2013, the Philippou brothers began creating "fake fail" videos for Facebook and started the YouTube channel RackaRacka, where they upload sketch comedy horror action videos with special effects, stunts and parodies of popular culture, such as their videos depicting McDonald's mascot Ronald McDonald (played by Michael) as a psychopathic evil clown. The channel was initially not monetised, with Danny financing the videos by volunteering for paid medical trials.

The channel's first huge success was Harry Potter VS Star Wars, which attracted 7 million views in a week, and won them a trip to the U.S. In 2014, Michael and Danny both crewed on the Australian horror film, The Babadook. The production company responsible for The Babadook, Triptych Pictures, has also produced videos for RackaRacka, including Versus, a series of three short films; RackaRacka Live (Stunt Gone Wrong); and Extreme Handball. Written and directed by the Philippou Brothers, the videos were shown on the Foxtel pay channel.

On 25 August 2018, Michael fought American YouTuber Scarce in an amateur boxing match on the undercard of KSI vs Logan Paul at Manchester Arena in Manchester, England, winning via technical knockout in the 3rd round.

== Directorial career ==
=== Talk to Me ===
Danny and Michael Philippou made their feature-length directorial debut with Talk to Me, a horror film starring Sophie Wilde, Zoe Terakes and Miranda Otto, set in the filmmakers' hometown of Adelaide and about a young woman who summons dead spirits with a mysterious severed and embalmed hand. Produced by the Australian production company Causeway Films, Talk to Me sold to numerous international distributors at Cannes in 2022. It had a preview screening at the Adelaide Film Festival on 30 October 2022, the closing night of the festival. The film had its world premiere at the 2023 Sundance Film Festival on 22 January 2023, and its European premiere at the 73rd Berlin International Film Festival on 21 February 2023, and was released in cinemas internationally from 27 July 2023.

On 3 August 2023, the Philippou brothers revealed that a prequel had been shot in a screenlife perspective, and on 8 August 2023, they confirmed a sequel, titled Talk 2 Me, was in development.

=== Bring Her Back ===
Following Talk to Me, the Philippou brothers directed another horror film titled Bring Her Back, which was also produced by Causeway Films. Starring Sally Hawkins and Billy Barratt, the film involves step-siblings who find themselves orphaned and placed in the middle of an occult ritual by their new foster mother. Bring Her Back began shooting in Australia in late June 2024 and was released in Australia on 29 May 2025 by Sony Pictures Releasing International.

=== Upcoming projects ===
In April 2023, the Philippous were hired to direct a Street Fighter film for Legendary Entertainment and Capcom. However, in June 2024, the duo left the project reportedly due to scheduling conflicts with Bring Her Back.

During an interview on The Project in June 2025, the Philippous revealed that they had met with Marvel Studios for a "mystery project", while also announcing that Talk 2 Me was officially in the works. They served as executive producers on I Let You In, a virtual reality 6-episode series based on the Talk to Me universe, which is set to debut on Meta Platforms in 2027.

== Legal issues ==
In December 2019, Michael was charged by South Australia Police with numerous crimes related to a video uploaded on 16 January 2019, which depicted him driving a heavily modified and watertight car on public roads while completely submerged and breathing partially through a hole in the roof. He was ordered to appear in court on 14 January 2020, but avoided conviction after entering a plea deal that saw him pay $2,000 in fines and court costs and disqualified him from driving for two weeks.

== In popular culture ==
In June 2025, Hideo Kojima revealed via Instagram that the Philippou brothers would be featured as non-playable characters in the video game Death Stranding 2: On the Beach.

== Filmography ==
=== Writing and directing ===
Year	Title	Director	Writer	Ref(s)
2022	Talk to Me	Yes	Danny only	
2025	Bring Her Back	Yes	Danny only	

Executive producers only

- I Let You In (2027)

=== Acting ===
Year	Title	Michael	Danny	Ref(s)
2018	Deadlock	Jed Manos	Ned Manos	
2019-24	The Strange Chores	Charlie		
2026	Street Fighter	Max	Scott	

== Awards and nominations ==
Year	Award	Category	Recipient(s)	Result	Ref.
2014	Australian Online Video Awards	Best Comedy	Harry Potter vs Star Wars	Won	
2014	Australian Online Video Awards	Best Overall	Harry Potter vs Star Wars	Won	
2015	Fright Meter Awards	Best Short Horror Film	RackaRacka	Nominated	
2015	Streamy Awards	Best International YouTube Channel	RackaRacka	Won	
2017	AACTA Awards	Best Online Video or Series	RackaRacka	Won	
2019	Streamy Awards	International: Asia Pacific	RackaRacka	Nominated	
2024	AACTA Awards	Best Direction	Talk to Me	Won	
2024	AACTA Awards	Best Screenplay	Talk to Me	Won	

== See also ==
- List of twins
