= I Was Actually There =

Australian documentary television series

- Genre: documentary series
- Created by: Kirk Docker; Aaron Smith; Jon Casimir
- Directed by: Kirk Docker
- Country of origin: Australia
- Original language: English
- No. of seasons: 2
- No. of episodes: 12

Production
- Executive producer: Kirk Docker
- Producers: Loni Cooper; Josh Schmidt; Jess Skinner
- Production location: Australia
- Production company: Docker Media

Original release
- Network: ABC TV
- Release: 9 July 2024 – present

Related
- You Can't Ask That

I Was Actually There is an Australian TV documentary series created by ABC Television which first premiered on 9 July 2024.

== Description ==
The documentary series explores major moments in our recent history through the eyes, ears and voices of those who were directly involved.

== Production ==
The series was created by the creators of You Can't Ask That, Kirk Docker, Aaron Smith and Jon Casimir. It is produced by Docker Media for the ABC. Docker is also the director and executive producer of the series, while Loni Cooper, Josh Schmidt and Jess Skinner serve as producers. A second series premiered on 7 October 2025. A third season will premiere on 9 November 2026.

== Podcast ==
A companion podcast with the same name also aired on 9 July 2024, hosted by Kirk Docker and will give an in depth interview with an individual that appears on the TV series.

== Season overview ==
Season	Episodes	Originally aired	
Season	Episodes	Season premiere	Season finale
1	6	9 July 2024	13 August 2024
2	6	7 October 2025	11 November 2025
3	6	9 November 2026	

== Episodes ==
=== Season 1 (2024) ===
No. in series	No. in season	Title	Original airdate
1	1	"Port Arthur massacre: 28 April 1996"	9 July 2024
2	2	"Boxing Day tsunami: 26 December 2004"	16 July 2024
3	3	"AFL footballer Nicky Winmar’s stand against racism: 17 April 1993"	23 July 2024
4	4	"The Beatles’ world record-breaking Adelaide visit: 12 June 1964"	30 July 2024
5	5	"Woomera Detention Centre breakout: 29 March 2002"	6 August 2024
6	6	"Beaconsfield mine rescue: 9 May 2006"	13 August 2024

=== Season 2 (2025) ===
No. in series	No. in season	Title	Original airdate
7	1	"Black Saturday bushfires: 7 February 2009"	7 October 2025
8	2	"September 11 Terroists Attack: 11 September 2001"	14 October 2025
9	3	"The Dismissal: 11 November 1975"	21 October 2025
10	4	"Cronulla Riots: 11 December 2005"	28 October 2025
11	5	"Fairlie Arrow Abduction Hoax: 1991"	4 November 2025
12	6	"Sydney to Hobart Yacht Race Tragedy: 27 December 1998"	11 November 2025

=== Season 3 (2026) ===
No. in series	No. in season	Title	Original airdate
13	1	"Julia Gillard's misogyny speech: 9 October 2012"	9 November 2026
14	2	"Thredbo Landslide: 30 July 1997"	16 November 2026
15	3	"Cangai Siege: 30 March 1993"	23 November 2026
16	4	"Prime Minister Harold Holt Disappears: 17 December 1967"	30 November 2026
17	5	"South Sydney Rabbitohs removal from competition: 15 October 1999"	7 December 2026
18	6	"Lismore Floods: 28 February 2022"	14 December 2026

== Reception ==
Graeme Blundell of The Australian wrote, "Docker has again created a kind of hybrid form, a marriage of the art of storytelling and the art of journalism, an entertaining attempt to make drama out of the observable world of real people, real places and real events.", about the series being created by Kirk Docker in a hybrid form.
