= Mikael Borglund =

Australian film and television executive

Mikael Borglund (born 1956) is the CEO and a founding director of Beyond International Limited, an Australian film and television production and distribution company.

== Early life ==
Borglund was born in Sweden and moved to Australia with his family when he was twelve years old.

== Career ==
He began his career as a chartered accountant with a large firm with corporate clients but moved to a smaller firm with prominent musical groups and celebrities among its clients. In 1984 he spun off his own company, CIC, in order to facilitate a major project of one of these clients. The company evolved into Beyond and became a full-time occupation. This company produced the television series Beyond 2000, Mythbusters, Selling Houses Australia, Stingers, and Halifax f.p.. His company also secured the rights to the 2025 Australian coverage of Eurovision. He was the executive producer of the films Lantana; John Farnham: Finding the Voice; Midnight Oil: The Hardest Line, and secured the international distribution rights to the films Strictly Ballroom and Chopper , The Crossing, Spotswood, and James Cameron’s Deepsea Challenge 3D.

Banjay bought Beyond in 2022, but two years later Borglund bought back the production division in order to run it as an independent production entity.

== Awards ==
In 2024 the Australian Academy of Cinema and Television Arts bestowed its award for Best Documentary on John Farnham: Finding the Voice, for which he had been executive producer. It also nominated another documentary he produced, Midnight Oil: The Hardest Line, as Best Documentary in 2025.

He has been a member of the board of directors of the Australian Film Institute and the Screen Producers Association of Australia.

== Philanthropic interests ==
He is a member of the board of directors of the Australian Children's Music Foundation and the Sony Foundation.

== Personal life ==
Borglund married in 1977 and has multiple children.
