= Nikki Barrett =

Australian casting director

- Occupation: Casting director

Nikki Barrett is an Australian casting director. She won a British Academy Film Award in the category Best Casting for the film Elvis.

== Selected filmography ==
- Elvis (2022; co-won with Denise Chamian)
