= Australian Film Institute Award for Best Screenplay =

Australian film award

Best Screenplay (Adapted or Original) AACTA Award
- Country: Australia
- Presented by: Australian Film Institute (AFI)
- First award: 1979
- Final award: 2007
- Website: http://www.aacta.org

The Australian Film Institute Award for Best Screenplay (Original or Adapted) was an award presented intermittently by the Australian Film Institute (AFI), for an Australian screenplay written directly for the screen or based on previously released or published material. It was handed out at the Australian Film Institute Awards (known commonly as the AFI Awards), which are now the AACTA Awards after the establishment of the Australian Academy of Cinema and Television Arts (AACTA), by the AFI. The award was handed out from 1975–1977, 1980–1982, 1990–1992, and again in 2007; two separate awards were created for "Best Adapted Screenplay" and "Best Original Screenplay" and have been presented intermittently from 1978–1979, 1983–1989, 1993–2006, and then from 2008, onwards. The award was first presented at the 1974-75 awards as a film prize which included a cash reward of $A1000.

== Winners and nominees ==
In the following table, films and screenwriters listed in bold, and in a blue background have received the special award; those listed in boldface and highlighted in gold are the winners of the competitive awards. Films and screenwriters that are not in boldface or highlighted are the nominees.

Winner of competitive award
Winner of special award

Year	Film	Screenwriter(s)
**1974-75** (17th)	**Petersen**	**David Williamson**
**1976** (18th)	**The Devil's Playground**	**Fred Schepisi**
1976 (18th)	The Trespassers	John Duigan
1976 (18th)	Picnic at Hanging Rock	Cliff Green
1976 (18th)	Caddie	Joan Long
**1977** (19th)	**Don's Party**	**David Williamson**
1977 (19th)	Storm Boy	Sonia Borg
1977 (19th)	The Fourth Wish	Michael Craig
1977 (19th)	The Picture Show Man	Joan Long
**1980** (22nd)	**Breaker Morant**	**Jonathan Hardy**, **David Stevens** and **Bruce Beresford**
1980 (22nd)	Hard Knocks	Hilton Bonner and Don McLennan
1980 (22nd)	...Maybe This Time	Anne Brooksbank and Bob Ellis
1980 (22nd)	Stir	Bob Jewson
**1981** (23rd)	**Gallipoli**	**David Williamson**
1981 (23rd)	Hoodwink	Ken Quinnell
1981 (23rd)	The Club	David Williamson
1981 (23rd)	Winter of Our Dreams	John Duigan
**1982** (24th)	**Goodbye Paradise**	**Bob Ellis** and **Denny Lawrence**
1982 (24th)	Lonely Hearts	Paul Cox and John Clarke
1982 (24th)	Moving Out	Jan Sardi
1982 (24th)	We of the Never Never	Peter Schreck
**1990** (32nd)	**The Big Steal**	**David Parker**
1990 (32nd)	Blood Oath	Denis Whitburn and Brian A. Williams
1990 (32nd)	Golden Braid	Paul Cox and Barry Dickins
1990 (32nd)	Struck by Lightning	Trevor Farrant
**1991** (33rd)	**Proof**	**Jocelyn Moorhouse**
1991 (33rd)	A Woman's Tale	Paul Cox and Barry Dickins
1991 (33rd)	Death in Brunswick	John Ruane and Boyd Oxlade
1991 (33rd)	Spotswood	Max Dann and Andrew Knight
**1992** (34th)	**Strictly Ballroom**	**Baz Luhrmann** and **Craig Pearce**
1992 (34th)	Black Robe	Brian Moore
1992 (34th)	Greenkeeping	David Caesar
1992 (34th)	The Last Days of Chez Nous	Helen Garner
**2000** (42nd)	**Russian Doll (film)**	**Stavros Kazantzidis** and **Allanah Zitserman**
2000 (42nd)	Better Than Sex	Jonathan Teplitzky
2000 (42nd)	Me, Myself, I	Pip Karmel
2000 (42nd)	My Mother Frank	Mark Lamprell
**2007** (49th)	**The Home Song Stories**	**Tony Ayres**
2007 (49th)	Clubland	Keith Thompson
2007 (49th)	Lucky Miles	Helen Barnes and Michael James Rowland
2007 (49th)	Noise	Matthew Saville
2007 (49th)	Romulus, My Father	Nick Drake
**2019** (61st)	**The Nightingale**	**Jennifer Kent**
2019 (61st)	The King	David Michôd, Joel Edgerton
2019 (61st)	Judy And Punch	Mirrah Foulkes
2019 (61st)	Hotel Mumbai	John Collee, Anthony Maras
**2020** (62nd)	**Babyteeth**	**Rita Kalnejais**
2020 (62nd)	Little Monsters	Abe Forsythe
2020 (62nd)	The Invisible Man	Leigh Whannell
2020 (62nd)	Relic	Natalie Erika James, Christian White
2020 (62nd)	True History of the Kelly Gang	Shaun Grant
