= AACTA Award for Best Screenplay, Original or Adapted =

Australian Film Institute Award

The Australian Film Institute Award for Best Screenplay, Original or Adapted is an award in the annual Australian Film Institute Awards. It has been awarded annually since 1967. In 2011, it was changed to the AACTA Awards.

While the category of Best Screenplay is given out in two different forms (Original or Adapted), some years involved the AACTA Awards handing out both types of screenplays in the same ceremony. The winners and nominees for those few years are listed below.

== Winners and nominees ==
In the following table, films and screenwriters listed in bold, and in a blue background have received the special award; those listed in boldface and highlighted in gold are the winners of the competitive awards. Films and screenwriters that are not in boldface or highlighted are the nominees.

Winner of competitive award
Winner of special award

| Year | Film | Screenwriter(s) | Source |
|---|---|---|---|
1970s
| 1975 | **Petersen** | **David Williamson** | **Original screenplay** |
| 1976 | **The Devil's Playground** | **Fred Schepisi** | **Original screenplay** |
| 1976 | Caddie | Joan Long | The novel Caddie, A Sydney Barmaid by Catherine Edmonds |
| 1976 | Picnic at Hanging Rock | Cliff Green | The novel of the same name by Joan Lindsay |
| 1976 | The Trespassers | John Duigan | Original screenplay |
| 1977 | **Don's Party** | **David Williamson** | **The play of the same name by Williamson** |
| 1977 | The Fourth Wish | Michael Craig | Based on television series of the same name by Craig |
| 1977 | The Picture Show Man | Joan Long | The memoirs by Lyle Penn |
| 1977 | Storm Boy | Sonia Borg | The novel Storm Boy by Colin Thiele |
1980s
| 1980 | **Breaker Morant** | **Jonathan Hardy, David Stevens and Bruce Beresford** | **Original screenplay** |
| 1980 | Hard Knocks | Don McLennan and Hilton Bonner | Original screenplay |
| 1980 | Maybe This Time | Bob Ellis and Anne Brooksbank | Original screenplay |
| 1980 | Stir | Bob Jewson | Original screenplay |
| 1981 | **Gallipoli** | **David Williamson** | **Original screenplay** |
| 1981 | The Club | David Williamson | The play of the same name by Williamson |
| 1981 | Hoodwink | Ken Quinnell | Original screenplay |
| 1981 | Winter of Our Dreams | John Duigan | Original screenplay |
| 1982 | **Goodbye Paradise** | **Bob Ellis and Denny Lawrence** | **Original screenplay** |
| 1982 | Lonely Hearts | Paul Cox and John Clarke | Original screenplay |
| 1982 | Moving Out | Jan Sardi | Original screenplay |
| 1982 | We of the Never Never | Peter Schreck | The novel of the same name by Jeannie Gunn |
1990s
| 1990 | **The Big Steal** | **David Parker** | **Original screenplay** |
| 1990 | Blood Oath | Denis Whitburn and Brian A. Williams | Original screenplay |
| 1990 | Golden Braid | Paul Cox and Barry Dickins | The story La Chevelure by Guy de Maupassant |
| 1990 | Struck by Lightning | Trevor Farrant | Original screenplay |
| 1991 | **Proof** | **Jocelyn Moorhouse** | **Original screenplay** |
| 1991 | Death in Brunswick | Boyd Oxlade and John Ruane | The graphic novel of the same name by Oxlade |
| 1991 | Spotswood | Max Dann and Andrew Knight | Original screenplay |
| 1991 | A Woman's Tale | Paul Cox and Barry Dickins | Original screenplay |
| 1992 | **Strictly Ballroom** | **Baz Luhrmann and Craig Pearce** | **Original screenplay** |
| 1992 | Black Robe | Brian Moore | The novel of the same name by Moore |
| 1992 | Greenkeeping | David Caesar | Original screenplay |
| 1992 | The Last Days of Chez Nous | Helen Garner | Original screenplay |
2000s
| 2007 | **The Home Song Stories** | **Tony Ayres** | **Original screenplay** |
| 2007 | Clubland | Keith Thompson | Original screenplay |
| 2007 | Lucky Miles | Helen Barnes and Michael James Rowland | Original screenplay |
| 2007 | Noise | Matthew Saville | Original screenplay |
| 2007 | Romulus, My Father | Nick Drake | The memoir of the same name by Raimond Gaita |
2010s
| 2019 | **The Nightingale** | **Jennifer Kent** | **Original screenplay** |
| 2019 | Hotel Mumbai | John Collee and Anthony Maras | Original screenplay |
| 2019 | Judy and Punch | Mirrah Foulkes | Original screenplay |
| 2019 | The King | David Michod and Joel Edgerton | The plays Henry IV, Part 1, Henry IV, Part 2 & Henry V by William Shakespeare |
2020s
| 2020 | **Babyteeth** | **Rita Kalnejais** | **The play of the same name by Kalnejais** |
| 2020 | The Invisible Man | Leigh Whannell | Original screenplay; characters and concept created by H. G. Wells for the novel of the same name |
| 2020 | Little Monsters | Abe Forsythe | Original screenplay |
| 2020 | Relic | Natalie Erika James and Christian White | Original screenplay |
| 2020 | True History of the Kelly Gang | Shaun Grant | The novel of the same name by Peter Carey |
| 2022 | **The Stranger** | **Thomas M. Wright** | **The non-fiction book The Sting: The Undercover Operation That Caught Daniel Morcombe's Killer by Kate Kyriacou** |
| 2022 | The Drover's Wife: The Legend of Molly Johnson | Leah Purcell | Original screenplay |
| 2022 | Elvis | Baz Luhrmann, Sam Bromell, Craig Pearce and Jeremy Doner | Original screenplay |
| 2022 | Nude Tuesday | Jackie van Beek | Original screenplay |
| 2022 | Three Thousand Years of Longing | George Miller and Augusta Gore | The short story The Djinn in the Nightingale's Eye by A. S. Byatt |
| 2023 | **Talk to Me** | **Danny Philippou and Bill Hinzman** | **Original screenplay** |
| 2023 | The New Boy | Warwick Thornton | Original screenplay |
| 2023 | Of an Age | Goran Stolevski | Original screenplay |
| 2023 | The Royal Hotel | Kitty Green and Oscar Redding | Based on the documentary film Hotel Coolgardie by Pete Gleeson |
| 2023 | Shayda | Noora Niasari | Original screenplay |
| 2024 | **Better Man** | **Simon Gleeson, Oliver Cole and Michael Gracey** | **Original screenplay** |
| 2024 | Furiosa: A Mad Max Saga | George Miller and Nico Lathouris | Based on the characters created by Miller, Byron Kennedy & Lathouris |
| 2024 | How to Make Gravy | Megan Washington and Nick Waterman | Based on the song of the same name by Paul Kelly |
| 2024 | Late Night with the Devil | Colin and Cameron Cairnes | Original screenplay |
| 2024 | Memoir of a Snail | Adam Elliot | Original screenplay |
| 2025 | **The Correspondent** | **Peter Duncan** | **Based on The First Casualty by Peter Greste** |
| 2025 | Bring Her Back | Danny Philippou and Bill Hinzman | Original screenplay |
| 2025 | Inside | Charles Williams | Original screenplay |
| 2025 | Lesbian Space Princess | Emma Hough Hobbs and Leela Varghese | Original screenplay |
| 2025 | Together | Michael Shanks | Original screenplay |
