= 1977 Australian Film Institute Awards =

Australian film awards ceremony in 1977

1977 Australian Film Awards
- Date: Wednesday, 21 September 1977
- Site: Regent Theatre; Sydney, New South Wales
- Hosted by: Karen Black; Keir Dullea; John Gorton

Highlights
- Best Film: Storm Boy
- Most awards: Don's Party (6)
- Most nominations: Storm Boy (9)

Television coverage
- Network: ABC

The 1977 Australian Film Awards ceremony, presented by the Australian Film Institute (AFI), honoured the best Australian films of 1976 on 21 September 1977 at Regent Theatre, in Sydney, New South Wales. It was televised on ABC. Actors Keir Dullea and Karen Black, and former Australian Prime Minister John Gorton hosted the show.

Don's Party won six awards including Best Direction and Best Actress. Other winners were The Picture Show Man with four awards, and Storm Boy with two awards including Best Film and the Jury Prize. Charles Chauvel was posthumously awarded the Raymond Longford Award.

== Ceremony ==
The ceremony was held on 21 September 1977 at Regent Theatre, in Sydney, New South Wales. It was hosted by actors Keir Dullea and Karen Black, and former Australian Prime Minister John Gorton. Films were nominated for awards in thirteen categories, marking the first time the awards were presented competitively and not as a film prize like previous years, with the exception of the non-feature film categories. The Awards were televised on ABC.

== Winners and nominees ==
The Australian Film Institute (AFI) presented awards across eighteen categories. Three new award categories were presented for Best Achievement in Sound, Best Costume Design and Best Art Direction, and the award for Best Original Music Score was reinstated after it had not been given since 1973. The recipients of the peer voted feature-film awards included the film Storm Boy, for Best Film; Bruce Beresford for Best Direction, for Don's Party; John Meillon for Best Actor, for The Fourth Wish; and Pat Bishop for Best Actress, for Don's Party. Charles Chauvel received the Raymond Longford Award posthumously for his contribution to Australian screen culture and environment, and was presented to his wife Elsa Chauvel. Storm Boy was nominated for nine awards but only received two; and Don's Party won five of the six awards it was nominated for, winning the most awards at the ceremony.
Non-feature films were presented with a gold, silver or bronze prize, or an honourable mention, and the awards were determined by a jury. The Love Letters from Teralba Road received a gold and silver prize, and a special award for creativity.

=== Peer voted awards ===
Winners of competitive awards marked first in boldface and highlighted in gold.

Category	Winners and nominees
Best Film	**Storm Boy – Matt Carroll**
Best Film	Break of Day – Patricia Lovell
Best Film	Don's Party — Phillip Adams
Best Film	The Picture Show Man — Joan Long
Best Direction	**Bruce Beresford – Don's Party**
Best Direction	Philippe Mora – Mad Dog Morgan
Best Direction	Chris Löfvén – Oz
Best Direction	Henri Safran – Storm Boy
Best Actor	**John Meillon – The Fourth Wish** as Casey
Best Actor	Noel Ferrier – Eliza Fraser as Captain James Fraser
Best Actor	David Gulpilil – Storm Boy as Fingerbone
Best Actor	John Meillon – The Picture Show Man as Maurice 'Pop' Pym
Best Actress	**Pat Bishop – Don's Party** as Jenny
Best Actress	Jeanie Drynan – Don's Party as Kath Henderson
Best Actress	Sara Kestelman – Break of Day as Alice
Best Actress	Robyn Nevin – The Fourth Wish as Connie
Best Supporting Actor	**John Ewart – The Picture Show Man** as Freddie Graves
Best Supporting Actor	John Ewart – Let the Balloon Go as PC Baird
Best Supporting Actor	Bill Hunter – Mad Dog Morgan as Sgt. Smith
Best Supporting Actor	Christopher Pate – Raw Deal as Dick
Best Supporting Actress	**Veronica Lang – Don's Party** as Jody
Best Supporting Actress	Anne Haddy – The Fourth Wish as Dr. Kirk
Best Supporting Actress	Ingrid Mason – Break of Day as Beth
Best Supporting Actress	Judy Morris – The Picture Show Man as Miss Lockhart
Best Screenplay (Original or Adapted)	**Don's Party – David Williamson**
Best Screenplay (Original or Adapted)	Storm Boy – Sonia Borg
Best Screenplay (Original or Adapted)	The Fourth Wish – Michael Craig
Best Screenplay (Original or Adapted)	The Picture Show Man – Joan Long
Best Art Direction	**The Picture Show Man – David Copping**
Best Art Direction	Break of Day – Wendy Dickson
Best Art Direction	Oz – Robbie Perkins
Best Art Direction	Storm Boy – David Copping
Best Costume Design	**The Picture Show Man – Judith Dorsman**
Best Costume Design	Let the Balloon Go – Ron Williams
Best Costume Design	Oz – Robbie Perkins
Best Costume Design	Storm Boy – Helen Evans
Best Sound	**Don's Party – William M. Anderson**
Best Sound	Oz – Les Luxford
Best Sound	Raw Deal – Bruce Lamshed
Best Sound	Storm Boy – Bob Cogger
Best Original Music Score	**The Picture Show Man – Peter Best**
Best Original Music Score	Storm Boy – Michael Carlos
Best Original Music Score	Mad Dog Morgan – Patrick Flynn
Best Original Music Score	Oz – Ross Wilson
Best Cinematography	**Break of Day – Russell Boyd**
Best Cinematography	Storm Boy – Geoff Burton
Best Cinematography	Raw Deal – Vincent Monton
Best Cinematography	Summer Of Secrets – Russell Boyd
Best Editing	**Don's Party – William M. Anderson**
Best Editing	Oz – Les Luxford
Best Editing	The Fourth Wish – Gerard Turney-Smith
Best Editing	Deathcheaters – Ron Williams

=== Jury voted prizes ===
Winners of the gold prize.
Winners of the silver prize.
Winners of the bronze prize.

Category	Winners
Jury Prize	**Storm Boy – Matt Carroll**
Best Documentary	**We Are All Alone My Dear – Paul Cox**
Best Documentary	**Greg – Tom Manefield**
Best Documentary	Here's To You Mr. Robinson – Peter Tammer, Gary Patterson (Honourable mention)
Best Short Fiction Film	**The Love Letters from Teralba Road – Richard Brennan**
Best Short Fiction Film	**The Singer and the Dancer – Gillian Armstrong**
Best Short Fiction Film	**Do I Have to Kill My Child? – Janet Isaac**
Best Short Fiction Film	The Idyll – Aphrodite Jansen (Honourable mention)
Best Short Fiction Film	In The Beginning – Mark D'Arcy-Irvine (Honourable mention)
Best Cinematography – Documentary	**The Love Letters from Teralba Road – Tom Cowan**
Best Cinematography – Documentary	**The Last Harvest – David Foreman**
Advertising	**Italy – Adrian Ussher**

=== Special awards ===
Raymond Longford Award

- Charles Chauvel

Jedda Award

- Storm Boy – Matt Carroll

Creativity award

- Tom Cowan – Journey Among Women
- Stephen Wallace – The Love Letters from Teralba Road
- Alexander Stitt – Rover
- Adrian Ussher – Phone Home To...

Macro Photography

- Densey Clyde, Jim Frazier – Garden Jungle

== See also ==
- AACTA Awards
