= AACTA Award for Best Cinematography =

Award presented by the Australian Academy of Cinema and Television Arts

- Country: Australia
- Presented by: Australian Academy of Cinema and Television Arts (AACTA)
- First award: 1976
- Currently held by: Simon Duggan, Furiosa: A Mad Max Saga (2024)
- Website: http://www.aacta.org

The AACTA Award for Best Cinematography is an award presented by the Australian Academy of Cinema and Television Arts (AACTA), a non-profit organisation whose aim is to "identify, award, promote and celebrate Australia's greatest achievements in film and television." The award is presented at the annual AACTA Awards, which hand out accolades for achievements in feature film, television, documentaries and short films. From 1976 to 2010, the category was presented by the Australian Film Institute (AFI), the Academy's parent organisation, at the annual Australian Film Institute Awards (known as the AFI Awards). When the AFI launched the Academy in 2011, it changed the annual ceremony to the AACTA Awards, with the current award being a continuum of the AFI Award for Best Cinematography.

Best Cinematography was first presented in 1976 Australian Film Institute Awards with the winner being chosen by the Australian Cinematographers Society (ACS). The award is presented to the cinematographer of a film that is Australian-made, or with a significant amount of Australian content. Russell Boyd, Simon Duggan, Peter James, Donald McAlpine and Geoffrey Simpson have won the award three times each, more than any other cinematographer. Boyd has received the most nominations with nine.

== Winners and nominees ==
In the following table, the years listed correspond to the year of film release; the ceremonies are usually held the same year.^{[A]} The films and cinematographers in bold and in yellow background have won are the winners. Those that are neither highlighted nor in bold are the nominees. When sorted chronologically, the table always lists the winning film first and then the other nominees.

Winner

Year	Film	Cinematographer(s)
**AFI Awards**
**1970s**
**1976** (18th)
**1976** (18th)	**The Devil's Playground**	**Ian Baker**
**1976** (18th)	Illuminations	Brian Gracey and Paul Cox
**1976** (18th)	Picnic at Hanging Rock	Russell Boyd
**1976** (18th)	Polly Me Love	David Gribble
**1977** (19th)
**1977** (19th)	**Break of Day**	**Russell Boyd**
**1977** (19th)	Raw Deal	Vincent Monton
**1977** (19th)	Storm Boy	Geoff Burton
**1977** (19th)	Summer of Secrets	Russell Boyd
**1978** (20th)
**1978** (20th)	**The Last Wave**	**Russell Boyd**
**1978** (20th)	The Chant of Jimmie Blacksmith	Ian Baker
**1978** (20th)	The Mango Tree	Brian Probyn
**1978** (20th)	Newsfront	Vincent Monton
**1979** (21st)
**1979** (21st)	**My Brilliant Career**	**Donald McAlpine**
**1979** (21st)	In Search of Anna	Michael Edols
**1979** (21st)	Mad Max	David Eggby
**1979** (21st)	Snapshot	Vincent Monton
**1980s**
**1980** (22nd)
**1980** (22nd)	**Breaker Morant**	**Donald McAlpine**
**1980** (22nd)	The Chain Reaction	Russell Boyd
**1980** (22nd)	Manganinnie	Gary Hansen
**1980** (22nd)	Stir	Geoff Burton
**1981** (23rd)
**1981** (23rd)	**Gallipoli**	**Russell Boyd**
**1981** (23rd)	The Club	Donald McAlpine
**1981** (23rd)	Roadgames	Vincent Monton
**1981** (23rd)	The Survivor	John Seale
**1982** (24th)
**1982** (24th)	**We of the Never Never**	**Gary Hansen**
**1982** (24th)	Mad Max 2	Dean Semler
**1982** (24th)	The Man from Snowy River	Keith Wagstaff
**1982** (24th)	Monkey Grip	David Gribble
**1983** (25th)
**1983** (25th)	**Careful, He Might Hear You**	**John Seale**
**1983** (25th)	Man of Flowers	Yuri Sokol
**1983** (25th)	Undercover	Dean Semler
**1983** (25th)	The Year of Living Dangerously	Russell Boyd
**1984** (26th)
**1984** (26th)	**Razorback**	**Dean Semler**
**1984** (26th)	My First Wife	Yuri Sokol
**1984** (26th)	Silver City	John Seale
**1984** (26th)	Strikebound	Andrew de Groot
**1985** (27th)
**1985** (27th)	**Rebel**	**Peter James**
**1985** (27th)	Bliss	Paul Murphy
**1985** (27th)	The Coca-Cola Kid	Dean Semler
**1985** (27th)	Wrong World	Ray Argall
**1986** (28th)
**1986** (28th)	**The Right-Hand Man**	**Peter James**
**1986** (28th)	Burke & Wills	Russell Boyd
**1986** (28th)	The Fringe Dwellers	Donald McAlpine
**1986** (28th)	Young Einstein	Jeff Darling
**1987** (29th)
**1987** (29th)	**Ground Zero**	**Steve Dobson**
**1987** (29th)	Belinda	Malcolm McCulloch
**1987** (29th)	The Umbrella Woman	James Bartle
**1987** (29th)	Warm Nights on a Slow Moving Train	Yuri Sokol
**1988** (30th)
**1988** (30th)	**The Navigator: A Medieval Odyssey**	**Geoffrey Simpson**
**1988** (30th)	Boulevard of Broken Dreams	David Connell
**1988** (30th)	Grievous Bodily Harm	Ellery Ryan
**1988** (30th)	The Lighthorsemen	Dean Semler
**1989** (31st)
**1989** (31st)	**Dead Calm**	**Dean Semler**
**1989** (31st)	Emerald City	Paul Murphy
**1989** (31st)	Georgia	Yuri Sokol
**1989** (31st)	Sweetie	Sally Bongers
**1990s**
**1990** (32nd)
**1990** (32nd)	**The Crossing**	**Jeff Darling**
**1990** (32nd)	Blood Oath	Russell Boyd
**1990** (32nd)	Flirting	Geoff Burton
**1990** (32nd)	Golden Braid	Nino Gaetano Martinetti
**1991** (33rd)
**1991** (33rd)	**Spotswood**	**Ellery Ryan**
**1991** (33rd)	Aya	Geoff Burton
**1991** (33rd)	Death in Brunswick	Ellery Ryan
**1991** (33rd)	Dingo	Denis Lenoir
**1992** (34th)
**1992** (34th)	**Black Robe**	**Peter James**
**1992** (34th)	Hammers Over the Anvil	James Bartle
**1992** (34th)	The Last Days of Chez Nous	Geoffrey Simpson
**1992** (34th)	Strictly Ballroom	Steve Mason
**1993** (35th)
**1993** (35th)	**The Piano**	**Stuart Dryburgh**
**1993** (35th)	Broken Highway	Steve Mason
**1993** (35th)	Map of the Human Heart	Eduardo Serra
**1993** (35th)	No Worries	Stephen F. Windon
**1993** (35th)	On My Own	Vic Sarin
**1994** (36th)
**1994** (36th)	**Exile**	**Nino Gaetano Martinetti**
**1994** (36th)	The Adventures of Priscilla, Queen of the Desert	Brian J. Breheny
**1994** (36th)	Bad Boy Bubby	Ian Jones
**1994** (36th)	Country Life	Stephen F. Windon
**1995** (37th)
**1995** (37th)	**Angel Baby**	**Ellery Ryan**
**1995** (37th)	Epsilon	Tony Clarke
**1995** (37th)	Mushrooms	Louis Irving
**1995** (37th)	That Eye, the Sky	Ellery Ryan
**1996** (38th)
**1996** (38th)	**Shine**	**Geoffrey Simpson**
**1996** (38th)	Children of the Revolution	Martin McGrath
**1996** (38th)	Mr. Reliable	David Parker
**1996** (38th)	What I Have Written	Dion Beebe
**1997** (39th)
**1997** (39th)	**Doing Time for Patsy Cline**	**Andrew Lesnie**
**1997** (39th)	Blackrock	Martin McGrath
**1997** (39th)	Kiss or Kill	Malcolm McCulloch
**1997** (39th)	The Well	Mandy Walker
**1998** (40th)
**1998** (40th)	**Oscar and Lucinda**	**Geoffrey Simpson**
**1998** (40th)	The Boys	Tristan Milani
**1998** (40th)	In the Winter Dark	Martin McGrath
**1998** (40th)	The Interview	Simon Duggan
**1999** (41st)
**1999** (41st)	**Passion**	**Martin McGrath**
**1999** (41st)	In a Savage Land	Danny Ruhlmann
**1999** (41st)	Praise	Dion Beebe
**1999** (41st)	Two Hands	Malcolm McCulloch
**2000s**
**2000** (42nd)
**2000** (42nd)	**Bootmen**	**Steve Mason**
**2000** (42nd)	15 Amore	John Brock
**2000** (42nd)	Chopper	Geoffrey Hall and Kevin Hayward
**2000** (42nd)	Looking for Alibrandi	Toby Oliver
**2001** (43rd)
**2001** (43rd)	**Moulin Rouge!**	**Donald McAlpine**
**2001** (43rd)	The Bank	Tristan Milani
**2001** (43rd)	La Spagnola	Steve Arnold
**2001** (43rd)	Yolngu Boy	Brad Shield
**2002** (44th)
**2002** (44th)	**Beneath Clouds**	**Allan Collins**
**2002** (44th)	Dirty Deeds	Geoffrey Hall
**2002** (44th)	Rabbit-Proof Fence	Christopher Doyle
**2002** (44th)	The Tracker	Ian Jones
**2003** (45th)
**2003** (45th)	**Japanese Story**	**Ian Baker**
**2003** (45th)	Gettin' Square	Garry Phillips
**2003** (45th)	Ned Kelly	Oliver Stapleton
**2003** (45th)	Travelling Light	Tristan Milani
**2004** (46th)
**2004** (46th)	**Somersault**	**Robert Humphreys**
**2004** (46th)	Love's Brother	Andrew Lesnie
**2004** (46th)	One Perfect Day	Gary Ravenscroft
**2004** (46th)	Tom White	Toby Oliver
**2005** (47th)
**2005** (47th)	**The Proposition**	**Benoît Delhomme**
**2005** (47th)	Little Fish	Danny Ruhlmann
**2005** (47th)	Oyster Farmer	Alun Bollinger
**2005** (47th)	Wolf Creek	Will Gibson
**2006** (48th)
**2006** (48th)	**Ten Canoes**	**Ian Jones**
**2006** (48th)	Jindabyne	David Williamson
**2006** (48th)	Macbeth	Will Gibson
**2006** (48th)	Suburban Mayhem	Robert Humphreys
**2007** (49th)
**2007** (49th)	**The Home Song Stories**	**Nigel Bluck**
**2007** (49th)	Clubland	Mark Wareham
**2007** (49th)	Noise	Laszlo Baranyai
**2007** (49th)	Romulus, My Father	Geoffrey Simpson
**2008** (50th)
**2008** (50th)	**Unfinished Sky**	**Robert Humphreys**
**2008** (50th)	The Black Balloon	Denson Baker
**2008** (50th)	Death Defying Acts	Haris Zambarloukos
**2008** (50th)	The Tender Hook	Geoffrey Simpson
**2009** (51st)
**2009** (51st)	**Samson and Delilah**	**Warwick Thornton**
**2009** (51st)	Balibo	Tristan Milani
**2009** (51st)	Beautiful Kate	Andrew Commis
**2009** (51st)	Last Ride	Greig Fraser
**2010s**
**2010** (52nd)
**2010** (52nd)	**Bright Star**	**Greig Fraser**
**2010** (52nd)	Animal Kingdom	Adam Arkapaw
**2010** (52nd)	Beneath Hill 60	Toby Oliver
**2010** (52nd)	The Waiting City	Denson Baker
**AACTA Awards**
**2011** (1st)
**2011** (1st)	**The Hunter**	**Robert Humphreys**
**2011** (1st)	Red Dog	Geoffrey Hall
**2011** (1st)	Sleeping Beauty	Geoffrey Simpson
**2011** (1st)	Snowtown	Adam Arkapaw
**2012** (2nd)
**2012** (2nd)	**The Sapphires**	**Warwick Thornton**
**2012** (2nd)	Burning Man	Garry Phillips
**2012** (2nd)	Lore	Adam Arkapaw
**2012** (2nd)	Wish You Were Here	Jules O'Loughlin
**2013** (3rd)
**2013** (3rd)	**The Great Gatsby**	**Simon Duggan**
**2013** (3rd)	Drift	Geoffrey Hall, Rick Rifici and Rick Jakovich
**2013** (3rd)	Goddess	Damian E. Wyvill
**2013** (3rd)	The Rocket	Andrew Commis
**2014** (4th)
**2014** (4th)	**Predestination**	**Ben Nott**
**2014** (4th)	Fell	Marden Dean
**2014** (4th)	The Railway Man	Gary Phillips
**2014** (4th)	Tracks	Mandy Walker
**2015** (5th)
**2015** (5th)	**Mad Max: Fury Road**	**John Seale**
**2015** (5th)	The Dressmaker	Donald M. McAlpine
**2015** (5th)	Last Cab to Darwin	Steve Arnold
**2015** (5th)	Oddball	Damian Wyvill
**2016** (6th)
**2016** (6th)	**Hacksaw Ridge**	**Simon Duggan**
**2016** (6th)	Girl Asleep	Andrew Commis
**2016** (6th)	Spear	Bonnie Elliott
**2016** (6th)	Tanna	Bentley Dean
**2017** (7th)
**2017** (7th)	**Lion**	**Greig Fraser**
**2017** (7th)	Hounds of Love	Michael McDermott
**2017** (7th)	Jungle	Stefan Duscio
**2017** (7th)	Red Dog: True Blue	Geoffrey Hall
**2018** (8th)
**2018** (8th)	**Sweet Country**	**Warwick Thornton**
**2018** (8th)	Breath	Marden Dean and Rick Rifici
**2018** (8th)	Ladies in Black	Peter James
**2018** (8th)	West of Sunshine	Thom Neal
**2019** (9th)
**2019** (9th)	**The King**	**Adam Arkapaw**
**2019** (9th)	Danger Close: The Battle of Long Tan	Ben Nott
**2019** (9th)	Hotel Mumbai	Nick Remy Matthews
**2019** (9th)	The Nightingale	Radek Ladczuk
**2020** (10th)
**2020** (10th)	**The Invisible Man**	**Stefan Duscio**
**2020** (10th)	Babyteeth	Andrew Commis
**2020** (10th)	Bloody Hell	Brad Shield
**2020** (10th)	Escape from Pretoria	Geoffrey Hall
**2020** (10th)	H is for Happiness	Bonnie Elliott
**2021** (11th)
**2021** (11th)	**The Dry**	**Stefan Duscio**
**2021** (11th)	High Ground	Andrew Commis
**2021** (11th)	Mortal Kombat	Germain McMicking
**2021** (11th)	Nitram	Germain McMicking
**2021** (11th)	Penguin Bloom	Sam Chiplin
**2022** (12th)
**2022** (12th)	**Elvis**	**Mandy Walker**
**2022** (12th)	Blaze	Jeremy Rouse
**2022** (12th)	The Drover's Wife: The Legend of Molly Johnson	Mark Wareham
**2022** (12th)	The Stranger	Sam Chiplin
**2022** (12th)	Three Thousand Years of Longing	John Seale
**2023** (13th)
**2023** (13th)	**The New Boy**	**Warwick Thornton**
**2023** (13th)	Godless: The Eastfield Exorcism	Carl Allison
**2023** (13th)	Shayda	Sherwin Akbarzadeh
**2023** (13th)	Sweet As	Katie Milwright
**2023** (13th)	Talk to Me	Aaron McLisky
**2024** (14th)
**2024** (14th)	**Furiosa: A Mad Max Saga**	**Simon Duggan**
**2024** (14th)	Better Man	Erik Wilson, Matt Toll and Ashley Wallen
**2024** (14th)	Force of Nature: The Dry 2	Andrew Commis
**2024** (14th)	Late Night with the Devil	Matthew Temple
**2024** (14th)	Memoir of a Snail	Gerald Thompson

== Notes ==
A: From 1958-2010, the awards were held during the year of the films release. However, the first AACTA Awards were held in 2012 for films released in 2011.
