= 1980 Australian Film Institute Awards =

Australian film awards ceremony in 1980

- Date: Wednesday, 17 September 1980
- Site: Regent Theatre; Sydney, New South Wales
- Hosted by: Graham Kennedy
- Directed by: Jacqui Culliton

Highlights
- Best Film: Breaker Morant
- Most awards: Breaker Morant (10)
- Most nominations: Breaker Morant (13)

Television coverage
- Network: ABC

The 22nd Australian Film Institute Awards ceremony, presented by the Australian Film Institute (AFI), honoured the best Australian feature films of 1980, and took place on 17 September 1980 at Regent Theatre, in Sydney, New South Wales. The ceremony was hosted by Graham Kennedy and televised in Australia on ABC.

Breaker Morant was nominated for thirteen awards and won ten, in all categories it was nominated for, including Best Film and Best Direction for Bruce Beresford. Other winners with two were Hard Knocks, and Manganinnie and ...Maybe This Time with one.

When the Australian Film Institute established the Australian Academy of Cinema and Television Arts (AACTA) in 2011, the awards became known as the AACTA Awards.

== Winners and nominees ==
The nominees were announced on 29 August 1980. Breaker Morant received 13 nominations across ten feature film award categories, winning all ten categories it was nominated for including: Best Film, Best Direction for Bruce Beresford, Best Actor for Jack Thompson, Best Supporting Actor for Bryan Brown and Best Screenplay for Jonathan Hardy, David Stevens, Bruce Beresford. Stir received ten nominations in the same categories but walked away with none. The only other winners in the feature film categories was Tracy Mann for Best Actress, for Hard Knocks; Jury Prize for Hard Knocks; Jill Perryman for Best Supporting Actress, for ...Maybe This Time; and Peter Sculthorpe for Best Original Music Score, for Manganinnie.

Non-feature films were awarded with a prize at the awards, but are considered the best in their categories by the Australian Academy of Cinema and Television Arts (AACTA). Although Bird of the Thunder Woman is considered the winner of the Best Cinematography – Documentary category, it was the recipient of a "silver prize" at the awards, while No Such a Place, also a finalist in the category, was presented with a "bronze prize".

Winners are listed first and marked in a separate colour, in boldface.

Category	Winners
Best Film	**Breaker Morant – Matthew Carroll**
Best Film	Manganinnie – Gilda Baracchi
Best Film	...Maybe This Time – Brian Kavanagh
Best Film	Stir – Richard Brennan
Best Direction	**Bruce Beresford – Breaker Morant**
Best Direction	Simon Wincer – Harlequin
Best Direction	John Honey – Manganinnie
Best Direction	Stephen Wallace – Stir
Best Actor	**Jack Thompson – Breaker Morant**
Best Actor	Edward Woodward – Breaker Morant
Best Actor	Bryan Brown – Stir
Best Actor	Max Phipps – Stir
Best Actress	**Tracy Mann – Hard Knocks**
Best Actress	Carmen Duncan – Harlequin
Best Actress	Mawuyul Yanthalawuy – Manganinnie
Best Actress	Judy Morris – ...Maybe This Time
Best Supporting Actor	**Bryan Brown – Breaker Morant**
Best Supporting Actor	Charles Tingwell – Breaker Morant
Best Supporting Actor	Lewis Fitz-Gerald – Breaker Morant
Best Supporting Actor	Dennis Miller – Stir
Best Supporting Actress	**Jill Perryman – ...Maybe This Time**
Best Supporting Actress	Jude Kuring – ...Maybe This Time
Best Supporting Actress	Michelle Fawdon – ...Maybe This Time
Best Supporting Actress	Lorna Lesley – The Chain Reaction
Best Screenplay	**Breaker Morant – Jonathan Hardy, David Stevens, Bruce Beresford**
Best Screenplay	Hard Knocks – Hilton Bonner, Don McLennan
Best Screenplay	...Maybe This Time – Anne Brooksbank, Bob Ellis
Best Screenplay	Stir – Bob Jewson
Best Cinematography	**Breaker Morant – Donald McAlpine**
Best Cinematography	Manganinnie – Gary Hansen
Best Cinematography	Stir – Geoff Burton
Best Cinematography	The Chain Reaction – Russell Boyd
Best Editing	**Breaker Morant – William M. Anderson**
Best Editing	Harlequin – Adrian Carr
Best Editing	Stir – Henry Dangar
Best Editing	The Chain Reaction – Tim Wellburn
Best Sound	**Breaker Morant – Gary Wilkins, William Anderson, Jeanine Chialvo, Phill Judd**
Best Sound	Harlequin – Gary Wilkins, Adrian Carr, Peter Fenton
Best Sound	Stir – Gary Wilkins, Andrew Steuart, Phill Judd
Best Sound	The Chain Reaction – Lloyd Carrick, Tim Wellburn, Phill Judd
Best Original Music Score	**Manganinnie – Peter Sculthorpe**
Best Original Music Score	...Maybe This Time – Bruce Smeaton
Best Original Music Score	Stir – Cameron Allan
Best Original Music Score	The Chain Reaction – Andrew Thomas Wilson
Best Art Direction	**Breaker Morant – David Copping**
Best Art Direction	Harlequin – Bernard Hides
Best Art Direction	Stir – Lee Whitmore
Best Art Direction	The Chain Reaction – Graham Walker
Best Costume Design	**Breaker Morant – Anna Senior**
Best Costume Design	Harlequin – Terry Ryan
Best Costume Design	Manganinnie – Graham Purcell
Best Costume Design	The Chain Reaction – Norma Moriceau
Best Documentary	**Front Line – David Bradbury**
Best Short Fiction Film	**Gary's Story – Richard Mihalchak**
Best Short Animation	**Pussy Pumps Up – Antoinette Starkiewicz**
Best Experimental Film	**Self Portrait Blood Red – Ivam Durrant**
Best Cinematography – Documentary	**Bird of the Thunder Woman – David Parer**
Best Cinematography – Documentary	**No Such a Place – Peter Butt, Tom Cowan**

== Special awards ==
Raymond Longford Award

- Tim Burstall

Jury Prize

- Hard Knocks – Don McLennan

== See also ==
- AACTA Awards
