= AACTA Award for Best Actor in a Supporting Role =

Australian film award

The Australian Film Institute Award for Best Actor in a Supporting Role is an award in the annual Australian Film Institute Awards. It has been awarded annually since 1974.

== Winners and nominees ==
Year	Actor	Film	Role
1970s
1974	Barry Humphries	The Great Macarthy	Colonel Ball-Miller
1975	Reg Lye	Sunday Too Far Away	Old Garth
1976	Drew Forsythe	Caddie	Sonny
1976	Jonathan Hardy	The Devil's Playground	Brother Arnold
1976	Thomas Keneally	The Devil's Playground	Father Marshall
1976	Tony Llewellyn-Jones	Picnic at Hanging Rock	Tom
1977	John Ewart	The Picture Show Man	Freddie
1977	John Ewart	Let the Balloon Go	Constable Baird
1977	Bill Hunter	Mad Dog Morgan	Sergeant Smith
1977	Christopher Pate	Raw Deal	Dick
1978	Ray Barrett	The Chant of Jimmie Blacksmith	Farrell
1978	Peter Carroll	The Chant of Jimmie Blacksmith	McCready
1978	Don Crosby	Newsfront	A.G. Marwood
1978	Chris Haywood	Newsfront	Chris Hewitt
1979	Alwyn Kurts	Tim	Ron Melville
1979	Michael Duffield	The Last of the Knucklemen	Methuselah
1979	Robert Grubb	My Brilliant Career	Frank Hawdon
1979	Hugh Keays-Byrne	Mad Max	Toecutter
1980s
1980	Bryan Brown	Breaker Morant	Lt. Peter Handcock
1980	Lewis Fitz-Gerald	Breaker Morant	Lt. George Ramsdale Witton
1980	Dennis Miller	Stir	Redford
1980	Charles 'Bud' Tingwell	Breaker Morant	Lt. Col. Denny
1981	Bill Hunter	Gallipoli	Major Barton
1981	Max Cullen	Hoodwink	Buster
1981	Harold Hopkins	The Club	Danny Rowe
1981	Bill Kerr	Gallipoli	Redford
1982	Garry McDonald	The Pirate Movie	Sergeant / Inspector
1982	David Argue	Going Down	Greg / Trixie
1982	John Bell	Far East	Peter Reeves
1982	Warren Mitchell	Norman Loves Rose	Morris
1983	John Hargreaves	Careful, He Might Hear You	Logan
1983	Simon Chilvers	Buddies	Alfred
1983	John Meillon	The Wild Duck	Old Ackland
1983	Martin Vaughan	The Winds of Jarrah	Ben
1984	Steve Bisley	Silver City	Victor
1984	David Argue	BMX Bandits	Whitey
1984	Steve Bisley	Fast Talking	Redback
1984	Peter Hehir	Fast Talking	Ralph Carson
1985	Nique Needles	The Boy Who Had Everything	Graham Cummerford
1985	Bryan Brown	Rebel	Tiger
1985	Jon Ewing	Bliss	Aldo
1985	Mark Little	An Indecent Obsession	Benedict Maynard
1986	John Hargreaves	Malcolm	Frank Baker
1986	Maurie Fields	Death of a Soldier	Det. Sgt. Martin
1986	Mark Little	Short Changed	Curly
1986	John Walton	Kangaroo	Jack Calcott
1987	Ben Mendelsohn	The Year My Voice Broke	Trevor Leishman
1987	Donald Pleasence	Ground Zero	Prosper Gaffney
1987	Bobby Smith	Initiation	Kulu
1987	Steven Vidler	The Umbrella Woman	Sugar Hills
1988	Kim Gyngell	Boulevard of Broken Dreams	Ian McKenzie
1988	Bruno Lawrence	Grievous Bodily Harm	Mick
1988	Paul Livingston	The Navigator: A Medieval Odyssey	Martin
1988	John Meillon	The Everlasting Secret Family	Judge
1989	Chris Haywood	Emerald City	Mike
1989	John Darling	Sweetie	Gordon
1989	Kym Gyngell	Heaven Tonight	Baz Schultz
1989	Bogdan Koca	Ghosts... of the Civil Dead	Waychek
1990s
1990	Steve Bisley	The Big Steal	Gordon Farkas
1990	John Polson	Blood Oath	Pvt. Jimmy Fenton
1990	Bartholomew Rose	Flirting	'Gilby' Fryer
1990	Toshi Shioya	Blood Oath	Lt. Tanaka
1991	Russell Crowe	Proof	Andy
1991	Chris Haywood	Aya	Mac
1991	Alwyn Kurts	Spotswood	Mr. Ball
1991	John Moore	Deadly	Eddie
1992	Barry Otto	Strictly Ballroom	Doug Hastings
1992	Bill Hunter	The Last Days of Chez Nous	Beth's Father
1992	Daniel Pollock	Romper Stomper	Davey
1992	August Schellenberg	Black Robe	Chomina
1993	David Ngoombujarra	Blackfellas	Floyd "Pretty Boy" Davies
1993	Nico Lathouris	The Heartbreak Kid	George
1993	Sam Neill	The Piano	Alisdair Stewart
1993	Barry Otto	The Custodian	Ferguson
1994	Max Cullen	Spider & Rose	Jack
1994	Bill Hunter	Muriel's Wedding	Bill Heslop
1994	Kiet Lam	Traps	Tuan
1994	John Polson	The Sum of Us	Greg
1995	Ray Barrett	Hotel Sorrento	Wal Moynihan
1995	Ben Mendelsohn	Metal Skin	Dazey
1995	Noah Taylor	Dad and Dave: On Our Selection	Joe Rudd
1995	Ben Thomas	Hotel Sorrento	Troy Moynihan
1996	Armin Mueller-Stahl	Shine	Peter
1996	Ray Barrett	Brilliant Lies	Brian Connor
1996	Robert Morgan	Life	Snakey
1996	Barry Otto	Cosi	Roy
1997	Andrew S. Gilbert	Kiss or Kill	Detective Crean
1997	Chris Haywood	Kiss or Kill	Detective Inspector Hummer
1997	Simon Lyndon	Blackrock	Ricko
1997	Charles 'Bud' Tingwell	The Castle	Lawrence Hammill QC
1998	John Polson	The Boys	Glenn Sprague
1998	Paul Capsis	Head On	Johnny/Tula
1998	Anthony Hayes	The Boys	Stevie Sprague
1998	Geoffrey Rush	A Little Bit of Soul	Godfrey Usher
1999	Bryan Brown	Two Hands	Pando
1999	Roy Billing	Siam Sunset	Bill Leach
1999	Mitchell Butel	Strange Fits of Passion	Jimmy
1999	Andrew S. Gilbert	Paperback Hero	Hamish
2000s
2000	Simon Lyndon	Chopper	Jimmy Loughnan
2000	Martin Henderson	Kick	Tom Bradshaw
2000	Sam Neill	My Mother Frank	Professor Mortlock
2000	Terry Norris	Innocence	John
2001	Vince Colosimo	Lantana	Nik D'Amato
2001	Alex Dimitriades	La Spagnola	Stefano
2001	Andrew S. Gilbert	Mullet	Peter Maloney
2001	Richard Roxburgh	Moulin Rouge!	The Duke of Monroth
2002	Nathaniel Dean	Walking on Water	Simon
2002	Luke Carroll	Australian Rules	Dumby Red
2002	Joel Edgerton	The Hard Word	Shane Twentyman
2002	David Gulpilil	Rabbit-Proof Fence	Moodoo the Tracker
2003	David Ngoombujarra	Black and White	Young Max Stuart
2003	Orlando Bloom	Ned Kelly	Joe Byrne
2003	Tony Bonner	Liquid Bridge	Bob McCallum
2003	Mitchell Butel	Gettin' Square	Con Katsakis
2003	David Field	Gettin' Square	Arnie DeViers
2004	Erik Thomson	Somersault	Richard
2004	Nathaniel Dean	Somersault	Stuart
2004	Dan Spielman	Tom White	Matt
2004	Hugo Weaving	The Old Man Who Read Love Stories	Rubicondo the dentist
2005	Anthony Hayes	Look Both Ways	Andy Walker
2005	Martin Henderson	Little Fish	Ray Heart
2005	John Hurt	The Proposition	Jellon Lamb
2005	Robert Menzies	Three Dollars	Nick
2006	Anthony Hayes	Suburban Mayhem	Kenny
2006	Tom Budge	Last Train to Freo	Trev
2006	Ronald Jacobson	Kenny	Bill Smyth
2006	Geoffrey Rush	Candy	Casper
2007	Marton Csokas	Romulus, My Father	Hora
2007	Russell Dykstra	Romulus, My Father	Mitru
2007	Frankie J. Holden	Clubland	John Maitland
2007	Richard Wilson	Clubland	Mark
2008	Luke Ford	The Black Balloon	Charlie Mollison
2008	Joel Edgerton	The Square	Billy
2008	Anthony Hayes	The Square	Greg "Smithy" Smith
2008	Erik Thomson	The Black Balloon	Simon Mollison
2009	Oscar Isaac	Balibo	José Ramos-Horta
2009	Bryan Brown	Beautiful Kate	Bruce Kendall
2009	Damon Gameau	Balibo	Greg Shackleton
2009	Brandon Walters	Australia	Nullah
2010s
2010	Joel Edgerton	Animal Kingdom	Barry 'Baz' Brown
2010	Guy Pearce	Animal Kingdom	Nathan Leckie
2010	Kodi Smit-McPhee	Matching Jack	Finn
2010	Sullivan Stapleton	Animal Kingdom	Craig Cody
AACTA Awards
2011 (1st)	Hugo Weaving	Oranges and Sunshine	Jack
2011 (1st)	John Gaden	The Eye of the Storm	Arnold Wyburd
2011 (1st)	Sam Neill	The Hunter	Jack Mindy
2011 (1st)	Robert Rabiah	Face to Face	Hakim Slimon
2012 (2nd)	Antony Starr	Wish You Were Here	Jeremy King
2012 (2nd)	Ryan Corr	Not Suitable for Children	Gus
2012 (2nd)	Liev Schreiber	Mental	Trevor Blundell
2012 (2nd)	Gary Waddell	The King is Dead	King
2013 (3rd)	Joel Edgerton	The Great Gatsby	Tom Buchanan
2013 (3rd)	Marton Csokas	Dead Europe	Nico
2013 (3rd)	Suthep Po-ngam	The Rocket	Purple
2013 (3rd)	Angus Sampson	100 Bloody Acres	Lindsay Morgan
2014 (4th)	Yılmaz Erdoğan	The Water Diviner	Major Hasan
2014 (4th)	Patrick Brammall	The Little Death	Richard
2014 (4th)	Robert Pattinson	The Rover	Reynolds
2014 (4th)	T.J. Power	The Little Death	Sam
2015 (5th)	Hugo Weaving	The Dressmaker	Sergeant Farrat
2015 (5th)	Mark Coles Smith	Last Cab to Darwin	Tilly
2015 (5th)	Alex Dimitriades	Ruben Guthrie	Damian
2015 (5th)	Anthony LaPaglia	Holding the Man	Bob Caleo
2016 (6th)	Hugo Weaving	Hacksaw Ridge	Tom Doss
2016 (6th)	Mark Coles Smith	Pawno	Pauly
2016 (6th)	Damon Herriman	Down Under	Jason
2016 (6th)	Sam Neill	The Daughter	Walter
2017 (7th)	Dev Patel	Lion	Saroo Brierley
2017 (7th)	Don Hany	Ali's Wedding	Mehdi
2017 (7th)	Jack Thompson	Don't Tell	Bob Myers
2017 (7th)	Hugo Weaving	Jasper Jones	Mad Jack Lionel
2018 (8th)	Simon Baker	Breath	Sando
2018 (8th)	Fayssal Bazzi	The Merger	Sayyid
2018 (8th)	Russell Crowe	Boy Erased	Marshall Eamons
2018 (8th)	Joel Edgerton	Boy Erased	Victor Sykes
2018 (8th)	Josh McConville	1%	Skink
2019 (9th)	Joel Edgerton	The King	Fastolf
2019 (9th)	Damon Herriman	The Nightingale	Ruse
2019 (9th)	Andrew Luri	Hearts and Bones	Sebastian Ahmed
2019 (9th)	Ben Mendelsohn	The King	King Henry IV
2019 (9th)	Michael Sheasby	The Nightingale	Aidan Carroll
2020 (10th)	Ben Mendelsohn	Babyteeth	Henry Finlay
2020 (10th)	Fayssal Bazzi	Measure for Measure	Farouk
2020 (10th)	Russell Crowe	True History of the Kelly Gang	Harry Power
2020 (10th)	Aaron Jeffery	The Flood	William 'Minto' Minton
2020 (10th)	Wesley Patten	H is for Happiness	Douglas Benson
2021 (11th)	Anthony LaPaglia	Nitram	Nitram’s father
2021 (11th)	Michael Caton	Rams	Les
2021 (11th)	Baykali Ganambarr	The Furnace	Woorak
2021 (11th)	Sean Mununggurr	High Ground	Baywara
2021 (11th)	Jack Thompson	High Ground	Moran
2022 (12th)	Sean Harris	The Stranger	Henry Teague
2022 (12th)	Simon Baker	Blaze	Luke
2022 (12th)	Jemaine Clement	Nude Tuesday	Bjorg Rasmussen
2022 (12th)	Malachi Dower-Roberts	The Drover's Wife: The Legend of Molly Johnson	Danny Johnson
2022 (12th)	Tom Hanks	Elvis	Colonel Tom Parker
2023 (13th)	Hugo Weaving	The Rooster	The Hermit
2023 (13th)	Mojean Aria	Shayda	Farhad
2023 (13th)	Eric Bana	Blueback	'Mad' Macka
2023 (13th)	Wayne Blair	The New Boy	George
2023 (13th)	Rob Collins	Limbo	Charlie
2023 (13th)	Zoe Terakes	Talk to Me	Hayley
2024 (14th)	Damon Herriman	Better Man	Nigel Martin-Smith
2024 (14th)	Fayssal Bazzi	Late Night with the Devil	Christou
2024 (14th)	Chris Hemsworth	Furiosa: A Mad Max Saga	Dementus
2024 (14th)	Damon Herriman	How to Make Gravy	Roger
2024 (14th)	Richard Roxburgh	Force of Nature: The Dry 2	Daniel Bailey
2024 (14th)	Hugo Weaving	How to Make Gravy	Noel
2025 (15th)	Julian McMahon (posthumous)	The Surfer	Scally
2025 (15th)	Damon Herriman	Together	Jamie McCabe
2025 (15th)	Cosmo Jarvis	Inside	Mark Shepard
2025 (15th)	Julian Maroun	The Correspondent	Mohamed Fahmy
2025 (15th)	Rahel Romahn	The Correspondent	Baher Mohamed
2025 (15th)	Jonah Wren Phillips	Bring Her Back	Oliver / Connor Bird
