= List of Australian films of 1992 =

List of Australian films of 1992 contains a detailed list of films created in Australia in 1992.

== 1992 ==
Title	Director	Cast	Genre	Notes
Amelia Rose Towers	Jackie Farkas		Short	
Backsliding	Simon Target	Tim Roth, Jim Holt, Odile Le Clezio	Drama / Thriller	
Big Ideas	Mike Smith	Justin Rosniak, Gosia Dobrowolska	Drama	
Black Harvest	Robin Anderson, Bob Connolly	Joe Leahy	Documentary	
Blinky Bill	Yoram Gross	Robyn Moore, Keith Scott	Animation	aka: "Blinky Bill: The Mischievous Koala"
Bloodlust	Jon Hewitt, Richard Wolstencroft	Jane Stuart Wallace, Kelly Chapman, Robert James O'Neill	Action / Horror	
Brain	Sarah Watt	Swaylee Loughnane	Short	
The Candle	Sarah Watt	J Bizel	Animation / Short	
Clowning Around	George Whaley	Clayton Williamson, Ernie Dingo, Rebecca Smart	Adventure / Comedy	
Come by Chance	Lara Dunston	Annabel Stokes, Simon Hann, Kathryn Collins	Documentary / Drama	
Come Rain or Shine	Frank Howson	Joan Brockenshire, Kole Dysart, Tommy Dysart	Drama	
Double Trouble	Tony Ayres		Short / Documentary	
Fatal Bond	Vince Monton	Linda Blair, Jerome Ehlers	Drama / Thriller	
FernGully: The Last Rainforest	Bill Kroyer	Samantha Mathis, Christian Slater, Robin Williams	Animation	
Fortress	Stuart Gordon	Christopher Lambert, Kurtwood Smith, Loryn Locklin	Action / Science-fiction	
Garbo	Ron Cobb	Stephen Kearney, Neill Gladwin, Max Cullen	Comedy	
Girl of Refugee from Vietnam		Tetsuo Kurata		
The Girl Who Came Late	Kathy Mueller	Miranda Otto, Martin Kemp, Gia Carides	Romance	aka: "Daydream Believer"
Greenkeeping	David Caesar	Mark Little, Lisa Hensley, Max Cullen	Comedy	
Hidden Injuries	Kaya Finlayson	Jason Clarke, Jeremy Cumpston, Michael Gwynne	Short	
Hurricane Smith	Colin Budds	Carl Weathers, Jürgen Prochnow	Action	
Illusion Is All	Sarah Watt		Animation / Short	
Jindalee Lady	Brian Syron	Lydia Miller, Patrick Ward, Michael Leslie	Romance	
Judy in a Land Called Oz	Ian Stahlhut	Judy Garland	Documentary	
The Last Days of Chez Nous	Gillian Armstrong	Lisa Harrow, Bruno Ganz, Kerry Fox	Comedy / Drama	Entered into the 42nd Berlin International Film Festival
Mad Bomber in Love	James Bogle	Craig Pearce, Marcus Graham, Zoe Carides	Comedy / Thriller	
Manufacturing Consent: Noam Chomsky and the Media	Mark Achbar, Peter Wintonick	Mark Achbar, Noam Chomsky	Documentary / War	
The Medium	Arthur Smith	Brenda Bakke	Thriller	
Modern Times	Graham Chase		Documentary	
North of Chiang Mai	John D. Lamond	Sam Bottoms	Action	
Numbering Bad Fruit	Dean Kendrick		Short	
The Nun and the Bandit	Paul Cox	Gosia Dobrowolska, Chris Haywood	Drama	
On the Border of Hopetown	Wayne Coles-Janess		Short	
Over the Hill	George T. Miller	Olympia Dukakis, Sigrid Thornton, Derek Fowlds	Drama / Romance	
A Passion Play	Tony Twigg		Short	
The Power of One	John G. Avildsen	Stephen Dorff, Armin Mueller-Stahl, Morgan Freeman	Drama	Based on book of same title
Redheads	Danny Vendramini	Claudia Karvan, Catherine McClements	Thriller	
Resistance	Hugh Keays-Byrne	Lorna Lesley, Jennifer Claire, Bob Noble	Action	
Road to Alice	Stavros Kazantzidis	Noah Taylor, Hugo Weaving, Helen Buday	Short	
Romper Stomper	Geoffrey Wright	Russell Crowe, Daniel Pollock, Jacqueline McKenzie	Action / Drama	
Secrets	Michael Pattinson	Beth Campion, Malcolm Kennard, Dannii Minogue, Willa O'Neill, Noah Taylor	Drama / Music	
Seeing Red	Virginia Rouse	Tony Llewellyn-Jones, Anne-Louise Lambert, Peta Toppano	Comedy / Thriller	
Serendipity	Karen Borger		Short	
Skippy	Bill Hughes	Danielle Mulholland		
A Slow Night at the Kuwaiti Cafe	Marc Gracie	Mike Bishop, Tiriel Mora		
Something Wicked	Bruce Redman	Veronica Neave, Josh McWilliam	Short	
Spotswood	Mark Joffe	Anthony Hopkins, Ben Mendelsohn	Comedy / Drama	aka: "The Efficiency Expert"
Stan and George's New Life	Brian McKenzie	Paul Chubb, John Bluthal, Julie Forsyth	Drama	
Strictly Ballroom	Baz Luhrmann	Paul Mercurio, Tara Morice, Bill Hunter, Barry Otto	Romantic comedy	Nominated for Golden Globe for best picture musical/comedy, AFI best picture winner and screened at Cannes in 1992
The Surrogate	Brent Houghton	Greg Stone	Short	
Turtle Beach	Stephen Wallace	Greta Scacchi, Joan Chen, Jack Thompson	Drama / Thriller	
Wet and Wild Summer!	Maurice Murphy	Christopher Atkins, Julian McMahon, Rebekah Carlton	Comedy	aka: "Exchange Lifeguards"

== See also ==
- 1993 in Australia
- 1993 in Australian television
