= Sara Kestelman =

English actress

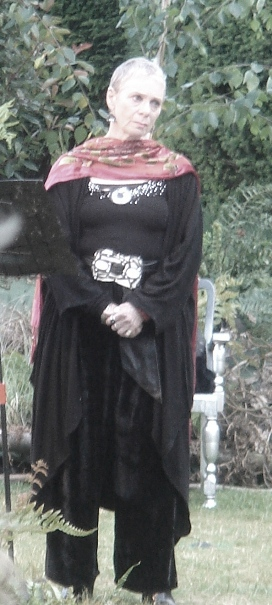
- Kestelman performing at A Breath of Fresh Air, 17 June 2008
- Born: 12 May 1944 (age 82); London, England
- Occupation: Actress

Sara Kestelman (born 12 May 1944) is an English actress, who is known for her roles as Lady Frances Brandon in the 1986 film Lady Jane, Fräulein Schneider in the 1993 London revival of the musical Cabaret (for which she won an Olivier award), as well as for providing the voice of Kreia in Star Wars Knights of the Old Republic II: The Sith Lords (2004).

== Life and career ==
Sara Kestelman was born on 12 May 1944 in London, the daughter of Dorothy Mary (née Creagh), a dress designer, and Morris Kestelman, an artist. Her father was Jewish, from a family from Russia.

During the 1970s Ms. Kestelman appeared in Granada Television's daytime drama series Crown Court, in which she played the part of Barrister Ann Merritt Q.C.

In 1994, she won a Laurence Olivier Theatre Award for "Best Performance in a Supporting Role in a Musical" for her performance as Fräulein Schneider in Cabaret in the London revival of the show. She has performed with the Royal National Theatre and the Royal Shakespeare Company. Kestelman joined the latter in 1968 but left in 1973 when she had her first film role in Zardoz. In 1982, she played Lady Macbeth.

Kestelman wrote a book of poetry, A Two Hander, with Susan Penhaligon. It was published by The Do-Not Press in 1996.

She voiced the character Kreia in the video game Star Wars: Knights of the Old Republic II: The Sith Lords.

== Filmography ==
=== Film ===
Year	Title	Role	Notes
1974	Zardoz	May	
1975	Lisztomania	Princess Carolyn	
1976	Break of Day	Alice	
1986	Lady Jane	Frances Grey, Duchess of Suffolk	
1997	Love Story: Berlin 1942	Narrator	
2006	Ex Memoria (short)	Eva	

=== TV ===
Year	Series	Episode	Role	Notes
1955	Dixon of Dock Green	"The Executioners" (No. 13.4) 22 October 1966	Sonia Watts	
1971	The Rivals of Sherlock Holmes	"The Mystery of the Amber Beads" (No. 2.13) 16 April 1973	Hagar	
1975	BBC2 Playhouse	"Mrs Ackland's Ghosts"	Mrs Ackland	
1975	Jack Flea's Birthday Celebration		Ruth	
1975	Under Western Eyes			
1976	The New Avengers	"Sleeper" (No. 1.10) 19 December 1976	Tina	
1976-1984	Crown Court	eight episodes	Ann Merritt	
1978	Kean		Elena, Countess de Koefeld	
1981	Nationwide	(No. 13.129) 16 July 1981		
1981	Bergerac	"See You in Moscow" (No. 1.5) 15 November 1981	Margaret Semple	credited as Sarah Kestelman
1985	Lady Windermere's Fan		Duchess of Berwick	
1989	Somewhere to Run		Magistrate	
1991	The War That Never Ends		Presenter (voice)	
1991	The Last Romantics		Queenie Leavis	
1991	Van der Valk	"Doctor Hoffmann's Children" (No. 4.1) 16 January 1991	Monika Hendricks	
1993	Cabaret		Fräulein Schneider	
1996	Brazen Hussies		Madame Zarene	
1997	Kavanagh QC	"Ancient History" (No. 3.3) 17 March 1997	Halina Birnbaum	
1997	The History of Tom Jones, a Foundling		Mrs. Wilkins	miniseries
1998	Invasion: Earth		Group Capt. Susan Preston	miniseries
1998	The Going Wrong		Tessa Mandeville	
2000	Relic Hunter	"Memories of Montmartre" (No. 1.22) 22 May 2000	Simone DeGuerre	
2000	Anna Karenina		Countess Vronskaya	miniseries
2001	Mind Games		Dr. Davina Ward	
2001	Hindenburg Disaster: Probable Cause		Narrator	
2003	Ultimate Force	Series 2, episode 2 'Mad Dogs'	Lady Lee	
2003	Trial & Retribution VII		Judge Emily Hilliard	
2004	Casualty	"Finding Faith" (No. 18.29) 13 March 2004	Mary Wynne	
2005	Midsomer Murders	"Hidden Depths" (No. 9.1)	Bernie	
2011	Holby City	"Old Habits" (No. 13.42) 8 February 2011	Clarice Parker	
2020	Inside No 9	"Thinking Out Loud" (No. 5.5) 2 March 2020	Therapist	
2022	This Is Going to Hurt	Episode 2 Episode 3	Magda Winnicka	
2025	Down Cemetery Road	Episode 2-5	Janice	

=== Documentaries ===
- Reputations – Wiesenthal and Lord Kitchener
- Horizon – Beyond a Joke

=== Theatre ===
- The Importance of Being Earnest ~ (Library Theatre, Manchester, England)
- The Crucible ~ (Library Theatre, Manchester, England)
- The Physicists ~ (Library Theatre, Manchester, England)
- A Midsummer Night's Dream ~ 1970 – Titania (Royal Shakespeare Theatre)
- Enemies ~ 1971 – (Aldwych Theatre, London, England)
- Macbeth ~ 1972 – Lady Macbeth (Birmingham Rep. England)
- Marquise of Keith ~ 1974 – Mona/Anna (Aldwych Theatre, London, England)
- Bedroom Farce ~ 1977 – (National Theatre, Lyttelton Theatre, London, England)
- State of Revolution ~ 1977 – Kollontai (Repertory Theatre, Birmingham/The Lyttelton Theatre, London, England)
- Twelve Repertoire Leaflets ~ 1978 – (National Theatre, London, England)
- The Double Dealer ~ 1978/9 – (Olivier Theatre, London, England)
- As You Like It ~ 1979 – Rosalind (National Theatre, London, England)
- Undiscovered Country ~ 1979 – (Olivier Theatre, London, England)
- The Fruits of Enlightenment ~ 1979 – Lady with the Monocle (Royal National Theatre, London, England)
- Eleven Repertoire Leaflets ~ 1979 –
- Nine Repertoire Leaflets ~ 1980 – (National Theatre, London, England)
- Childe Byron ~ 1981 – (Young Vic, London, England)
- Macbeth ~ 1982 – (Royal Shakespeare Company, England)
- Love for Love ~ 1985 – (Lyttelton Theatre, London, England)
- Repertoire Leaflet ~ 1985/6 – (National Theatre, London, England)
- The Threepenny Opera ~ 1986 – (Olivier Theater, London, England)
- Four Repertoire Leaflets ~ 1986 – (Royal National Theatre, London, England)
- The American Clock ~ 1986 – (Royal National Theatre, London, England)
- Dalliance ~ 1986 – (Lyttelton Theatre, London, England)
- Lettice and Lovage ~ 1988 – (West End, London, England)
- Point Valaine ~ 1991 – Linda Valaine (Minerva Studio, Chichester, UK) (see Actor Connections – Theatre)
- Cabaret ~ 1993 – Fraulein Schneider (Donmar Warehouse, London, England)
- Fiddler on the Roof ~ 1994 – (London Palladium, London, England)
- Three Tall Women ~ 1995 – (Wyndham's Theatre, London, England)
- Nine ~ 1996 – (Donmar Warehouse, London, England)
- Copenhagen ~ 1998 – Margrethe Bohr (The Duchess Theatre; West End, London, England)
- Maria Marten or Murder in the Red Barn and Victorian Music Hall ~ 1999 – Dame Marten (Britten Theatre, London, England)
- All About Me ~ 2001 – one woman show (Royal National Theatre, the Firebird Cafe in New York, the Royal Academy of Art)
- Hamlet ~ 2001 – Queen Gertrude (Wilbur Theatre, Boston, MA, US)
- Bitter Fruits of Palestine ~ 2002 – (Barons Court Theatre, London, England)
- The Shape of Metal ~ 2003 – Nell Jeffrey (Abbey Theatre, Dublin, Ireland)
- Girl with a Pearl Earring ~ 2008 (Cambridge Arts Theatre; West End, London, England)
- Torch Song Trilogy ~ 2012 – Mrs Backoff (Menier Chocolate Factory, London)
- The Intelligent Homosexual's Guide to Capitalism and Socialism with a Key to the Scriptures – 2016 – Clio – (Hampstead Theatre)
- The Lady in the Van - 2017 - Margaret Fairchild/Miss Shepherd - (Theatre Royal, Bath)

=== Audio books ===
- King Lear ~ 2002 – Regan
- Mill on the Floss
- Proto Zoe
- Quarantine
- The Siege
- When I Lived in Modern Times
- Full House

=== Radio ===
- Full House (read and adapted)
- Baldi

=== Video games ===
- Star Wars: Knights of the Old Republic II: The Sith Lords ~ 2004 – voice of Kreia
- Shattered Union ~ 2005 – Narrator (voice)

== Awards and nominations ==
Year	Award	Category	Work	Result	Refs.
1977	Australian Film Institute Awards	Best Actress in a Leading Role	Break of Day	Nominated	
1994	Clarence Derwent Award	Best female in a supporting role	Cabaret	Won	
1994	Laurence Olivier Awards	Best Performance in a Supporting Role in a Musical	Cabaret	Won	
2004	The Irish Times Irish Theatre Awards	Best Actress	The Shape of Metal	Nominated	
