= Stir (1980 film) =

- Australian film poster
- Directed by: Stephen Wallace
- Screenplay by: Bob Jewson
- Produced by: Richard Brennan
- Starring: Bryan Brown; Max Phipps; Dennis Miller; Michael Gow; Phil Motherwell; Gary Waddell; Ray Marshall
- Cinematography: Geoff Burton
- Edited by: Henry Dangar
- Music by: Cameron Allan
- Production companies: New South Wales Film Corporation; Marda Enterprises; Atlab Australia; Smiley Films
- Distributed by: Hoyts Distribution
- Release date: 23 October 1980
- Running time: 101 minutes
- Country: Australia
- Language: English
- Budget: AU$485,000

Stir is a 1980 Australian prison drama film directed by Stephen Wallace in his feature directorial debut. The prison film was written by Bob Jewson, based upon his own experience, while incarcerated, of the 1974 prison riot at Bathurst Correctional Complex and the subsequent Royal Commission into New South Wales Prisons. The film was shot in Clare Valley, Gladstone and the Flinders Ranges in South Australia. It premiered at the 1980 Cannes Film Festival.

== Cast ==
- Bryan Brown as China Jackson
- Max Phipps as Orton
- Gary Waddell as Dave
- Phil Motherwell as Alby
- Robert Noble as Riley
- Paul Sonkkila as McIntosh
- Dennis Miller as Redford

== Production ==
Bob Jewson was a prisoner in Bathurst Gaol at the time of the riot and wrote a script, originally called Bathurst, based on the event. Martha Ansara who was working for the Prison Action Group read it and introduced Jewson to Stephen Wallace, who decided to make the film. Other accounts have Tony Green making the introduction.

The New South Wales Film Corporation was looking at investing in some films made by directors who had made successful short films. Wallace had just made the acclaimed one-hour drama The Love Letters from Teralba Road and they asked him if he had any projects. He told them about his prison drama.

As part of his preparations, Wallace had the actors do a clown workshop for four days and a longer workshop of three weeks. Most of them disliked the clown workshop which Wallace later admitted was a mistake.

The original drafts of the script had some female characters, such as a social worker and a girlfriend of Bryan Brown's character, but these were dropped.

The film was shot over five weeks in October and November 1979 in South Australia at Gladstone Gaol. The makers had trouble sourcing enough extras and had to fly them in from Adelaide; some of the actors who did appear had been to prison. Wallace tried to get more Aboriginal extras but was unable.

During filming the movie was known as The Promotion of Mr Smith until Jewson suggested the shorter title Stir. Wallace:

Bob Jewson said one thing - and I think this is what we tried to make the theme of the film, although it was very hidden - that riots don't happen out of the blue. The prison authorities make you believe that all these criminals that are incarcerated are at all times dangerous and they're trying to get out. But Bob said that's never true; most of them have accepted their lot and they're trying to serve their time. They only get into a riot situation when they're treated badly and unfairly over a long period. He said most people don't want a riot; they know what it's going to mean, longer in jail.

== Reception ==
The film was reasonably popular and according to Wallace it made a profit.

=== Critical reception ===
Writing in 2009, David O'Connell of In Film Australia praised the Bob Jewson’s screenplay, saying it "carries with it a certifiable authenticity, being based on his own time inside during the Bathurst prison riots of February 1974... Brutal and profane, Stir is a no-holds-barred, revelatory glimpse into life inside and rates as an Australian classic. The dialogue is loose and jagged and these men, as part of a uniformly excellent ensemble, look every bit the part of desperate beaten-down prisoners". Writing in Paper Chained in 2024, Jennifer Myers praised the film's historical accuracy and integrity, saying it served "as an Ode to the prisoners’ experiences while highlighting the Royal Commission’s significance", concluding the film was a "fascinating watch that reveals what man is capable of when motivated by fear and desperation".

=== Accolades ===
At the 1980 Australian Film Institute Awards, Stir, received 11 nominations but did not win any categories.

Award	Category	Subject	Result
AACTA Awards (1980 AFI Awards)	Best Film	Richard Brennan	Nominated
AACTA Awards (1980 AFI Awards)	Best Direction	Stephen Wallace	Nominated
AACTA Awards (1980 AFI Awards)	Best Screenplay, Original or Adapted	Bob Jewson	Nominated
AACTA Awards (1980 AFI Awards)	Best Actor	Bryan Brown	Nominated
AACTA Awards (1980 AFI Awards)	Best Actor	Max Phipps	Nominated
AACTA Awards (1980 AFI Awards)	Best Supporting Actor	Dennis Miller	Nominated
AACTA Awards (1980 AFI Awards)	Best Cinematography	Geoff Burton	Nominated
AACTA Awards (1980 AFI Awards)	Best Editing	Henry Dangar	Nominated
AACTA Awards (1980 AFI Awards)	Best Original Music Score	Cameron Allan	Nominated
AACTA Awards (1980 AFI Awards)	Best Sound	Phil Judd	Nominated
AACTA Awards (1980 AFI Awards)	Best Sound	Andrew Steuart	Nominated
AACTA Awards (1980 AFI Awards)	Best Sound	Gary Wilkins	Nominated
AACTA Awards (1980 AFI Awards)	Best Production Design	Lee Whitmore	Nominated

== Home media ==
The DVD was released by Umbrella Entertainment and contains a new 16:9 aspect ratio transfer, a 50-minute interview feature with key cast and crew, as well as the original theatrical trailer.

== See also ==
- Cinema of Australia
