= Joy Hruby =

Australian actress and television presenter

Joy Hruby OAM
- Born: Joy Elaine Cox; 1 July 1927; Taree, New South Wales, Australia
- Died: 21 February 2017 (aged 89); Sydney, New South Wales, Australia
- Education: Whitehall Academy of Dramatic Art, J.C. Williamson
- Occupations: Actress; comedian; television presenter; producer; film-maker; author; agent
- Notable work: Joy's World; Dubbo Dazzlers (book)
- Family: Anna Hruby (daughter)

Joy Elaine Hruby (1 July 1927 – 21 February 2017) was an Australian actress and entertainer, comedian, TV presenter and interviewer, producer, film-maker, author and celebrity agent with a career spanning more than 50 years.

Hruby appeared in films including Caddie, The Love Letters from Teralba Road, Winter of our Dreams, and Kitty and the Bagman.

Hruby had small roles in TV soap operas including, Sons and Daughters and Home and Away, G.P. and All Saints and featured the mini-series Brides of Christ, she also appeared in numerous theatre productions and entered films into Tropfest.

== Biography ==
Hruby was born in Taree, New South Wales, the fourth of five siblings to Grace Adelaide Esther Thomas, a public speaker, union woman, community worker and suffragist and Henry "Harry" James Cox, who was a station master at Dubbo during WWII, ham radio enthusiast and maker of steel guitars. She married Czech jazz pianist Zdenek Hruby in 1954 and the couple had three children: actress Anna Hruby, Frank (a cameraman) and Janette (a former film location caterer). Hruby studied at the Whitehall Academy of Dramatic Arts and then the J. C. Williamson theatre, and appeared in a production of Othello as Desdemona.

Hruby also had a community TV program on Channel 31 (later TVS) in Sydney and Melbourne titled Joy's World. She was known for brightly-coloured feathered costumes and feather boas, and her signature sign-off line, "...and keep smiling". After Prime Minister Malcolm Turnbull cancelled community television, she launched her own website and YouTube channel.

Her contribution to the arts and entertainment was recognised with an Order of Australia Medal (OAM) in the 2007 Queen's New Years Honours List. Published in 2003, she wrote a wartime memoir, Dubbo Dazzlers, which was also the name of a dance troupe she formed in Dubbo during WWII. Hruby had previously written notes for a biography titled The Spectacular Life of Joy Hruby. She won a Critics' Circle Theatre Award for Half in Ernest.

Hruby was later married to Denny, a pianist. She died, aged 89 on 21 February 2017. Her service was held at Wilde Street Anglican Church at Maroubra, New South Wales on 2 March 2017.

== Filmography ==
=== Film ===
Year	Title	Role	Type
1976	Caddie	Mrs Sweeney	Feature film
1977	The Love Letters from Teralba Road	Len's Mother	Short Feature film
1981	Winter of Our Dreams	Marge	Feature film
1982	Heatwave	Old Lady	Feature film
1982	The Dark Room	Ida Henning	Feature film
1985	A Street to Die	Maureen	Feature film
1987	Confidentially Speaking	EAP Lady	Film short
1993	You and Me and Uncle Bob	Mrs Patterson	Feature film
1998	Praise	Old Woman	Feature film
1999	All the Way	Mrs Kravytz	Feature film
2007	Music Box	Aunt Mary	Film short
2008	The Eighth	Story	Film short
2010	Conference of the Planets	Role unknown	Film short
2010	Donation Only	Mrs B	Film short
2010	The Key to the Computer	Story	Film short

=== Television ===
Year	Title	Role	Type
1976	No Room to Run	Woman On Beach	ABC TV movie, US/AUSTRALIA
1977	The Outsiders	Guest role: Ella	TV series Germany/Australia, 1 episode
1977	Puzzle	Guest role	ABC TV movie, US/Australia
1980	Spring & Fall	Guest role: Woman Selling House	ABC TV series, 1 episode
1982;1983	A Country Practice	Guest role: The Waitress	TV series, 2 episodes
1983	Scales of Justice	Guest role: Mrs Simpson	ABC TV film series, 1 episode 1. "The Job"
1983	A Country Practice	Guest role: Mrs Farrow	TV series, 2 episodes
1984	Sweet And Sour	Guest role	ABC TV series, 1 episode
1985	Sons And Daughters	Guest role: Prostitute	TV series, 1 episode
1986	A Fortunate Life	Recurring role: Ma	TV miniseries, 1 episode
1986	Alice to Nowhere	Recurring role: Mrs Leary	TV miniseries, 2 episodes
1987-2001	Sunday Joyride	Herself - Presenter	TV series
1988	Mother and Son	Guest role: Woman Shopper	ABC TV series, 1 episode
1988	Mike Willesee's Australians	Guest role: Mrs Whittle	TV film series, 1 episode 5: "Lottie Lyell"
1988;1989	Rafferty's Rules	Guest roles: Mrs Barnes / Dero Lady	TV series, 2 episodes
1990-2015	Joy's World	Herself - Presenter	TV series
1991	Brides of Christ	Recurring role: Sister Polycarp	ABC TV miniseries, 6 episodes
1992	Phoenix	Guest role: Fat Alice	ABC TV series, 1 episode
1994;1996	G.P.	Guest roles: Mrs Lucas / Millie	ABC TV series, 2 episodes
1994;1995	Darren Gray Down Under	Herself - Guest	TV series, 3 episodes
1994	TVTV	Herself & The Young Doctors cast	ABC TV series, 1 episode
1995-1996	Agatha Ramsbottom Show	Herself - Presenter	TV series
1996;1998	Home and Away	Guest roles: Mrs Riley / Mrs Penrose	TV series, 2 episodes
1998;2004	All Saints	Guest roles: Mrs Heinrich / Robin Wallace	TV series, 3 episodes
2000	Above the Law	Guest role: Mrs Meriwether	TV series, 1 episode
2004	Double the Fist	Guest role: Edith	ABC TV series, 1 episode
2011	The Hamster Wheel	Additional Cast	TV series, 2 episodes
2011;2012	Laid	Recurring Guest role: Nan-Nan	ABC TV series, 2 episodes
2017	Ten News	Herself - Joy Hruby Funeral Service	TV series, 1 episode
2017	The Project	Herself - Joy Hruby Funeral Service	TV series, 1 episode
