= Ian Baker (cinematographer) =

Australian cinematographer

- Born: 1947 (age 78–79); Melbourne, Victoria, Australia

Ian Baker (born 1947) is an Australian cinematographer.

He was born in Melbourne in 1947 and studied sculpture and painting at Fine Art School and Swinburne College of Advanced Education (now the Victorian College of the Arts (VCA)).

Starting with a job as runner on commercials for Fred Schepisi's production company, Film House, Baker spent much of his career shooting Schepisi's films.

== Filmography ==
- Getting Back to Nothing (1971)
- The Devil's Playground (1976)
- The Chant of Jimmie Blacksmith (1978)
- Barbarosa (1982)
- The Clinic (1982)
- Iceman (1984)
- Plenty (1985)
- The Last Frontier (1986)
- Roxanne (1987)
- Evil Angels a.k.a. A Cry in the Dark (1988)
- The Punisher (1989)
- Everybody Wins (1990)
- The Russia House (1990)
- Mr. Baseball (1992)
- Six Degrees of Separation (1993)
- I.Q. (1994)
- The Chamber (1996)
- Fierce Creatures (1997)
- Queen of the Damned (2002)
- It Runs in the Family (2003)
- Japanese Story (2003)
- Empire Falls (2005)
- Evan Almighty (2007)
- The Eye of the Storm (2011)
- Words and Pictures (2013)
