= Bruce Beresford =

Australian filmmaker (born 1940)

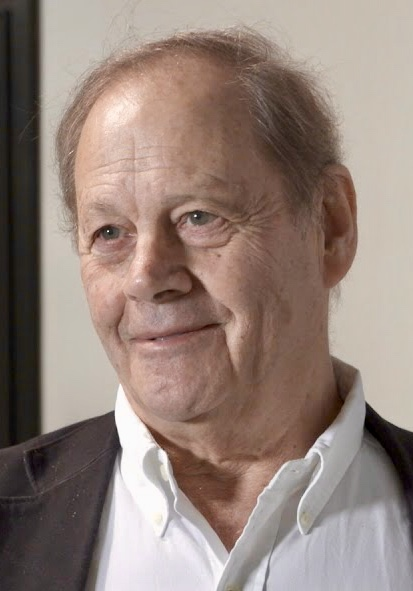
- Beresford in 2016
- Born: 16 August 1940 (age 86); Paddington, New South Wales, Australia
- Education: University of Sydney (BA)
- Occupations: Film director; screenwriter; producer
- Years active: 1970–present
- Spouse: Virginia Duigan

Bruce Beresford (/ˈbɛrɪsfərd/; born 16 August 1940) is an Australian film director, opera director, screenwriter, and producer. He began his career during the Australian New Wave, and has made more than 30 feature films over a 50-year career, both locally and internationally in the United States. He is a two-time Academy Award nominee, and a four-time AACTA/AFI Awards winner out of 10 total nominations.

Beresford's films include Breaker Morant (1980), Tender Mercies (1983), Crimes of the Heart (1986), Driving Miss Daisy (1989) – which won four Oscars, including Best Picture – Black Robe (1991), Silent Fall (1994), Double Jeopardy (1999), Mao's Last Dancer (2009), and Ladies in Black (2018). He was nominated for Academy Awards for Best Adapted Screenplay for Breaker Morant, and Best Director for Tender Mercies. He won AACTA/AFI Awards – Best Direction (2) for Don's Party (1976) and Breaker Morant, and Best Screenplay (2) for Breaker Morant and The Fringe Dwellers (1986).

In addition, four of Beresford's films have been nominated for the Palme d'Or, and four have been nominated for the Golden Bear. He has also been nominated for two BAFTA Awards, a Golden Globe Award, a Directors Guild of America Award, and won a Genie Award.

== Early life and education ==
Beresford was born in Paddington, New South Wales, the son of Lona (née Warr) and Leslie Beresford, who sold electrical goods. He grew up in the then outer-western suburb of Toongabbie, and went to The Meadows Public School and then The King's School, Parramatta. He made several short films in his teens including The Hunter (1959).

He completed a Bachelor of Arts majoring in English at the University of Sydney, where he graduated in 1964. While at university he made the short film The Devil to Pay (1962) starring John Bell and Ron Blair, It Droppeth as the Gentle Rain (1963) co-directed by Albie Thoms and starring Germaine Greer, Clement Meadmore (1963) with Bell and King-size Woman (1965).

== Career ==
=== Nigeria and England ===
Beresford then moved to England in search of film work. He could not break into the British film scene, so he answered an advertisement for an editing job in Nigeria, where he worked for two years, in Enugu.

He then returned to England and worked for the British Film Institute as a producer of short films by first-time directors, including Magritte: The False Mirror (1970) and Paradigm (1970).

Beresford directed the documentary Lichtenstein in London (1968) about Roy Lichtenstein, and Extravaganza (1968), Barbara Hepworth at the Tate (1970), The Cinema of Raymond Fark (1970), and Arts of Village India (1972).

=== Early feature films ===
Beresford returned to Australia to make his first feature film, The Adventures of Barry McKenzie (1972), which he also wrote with Barry Humphries. The film, produced by Phillip Adams, was a box office success in England and Australia, but Beresford later said making the film was a "mistake" because reviews were so bad that he had trouble finding other work.

Beresford directed a documentary for TV, The Wreck of the Batavia (1973) and did some other TV films, Poor Fella Me (1973), and Monster or Miracle? Sydney Opera House (1973). These were financed by Reg Grundy who also financed Beresford's second feature as director, Barry McKenzie Holds His Own (1974), a sequel to Barry McKenzie.

Stranded in London without funds, Beresford agreed to direct and co-write a comedy, Side by Side (1975) starring Humphries and Terry-Thomas (this poorly received film was released on DVD in 2013). The money he received enabled him to return to Australia where, Beresford says, Phillip Adams "saved my life" by offering him the job of directing an acclaimed version of David Williamson's play Don's Party (1976).

Soon afterwards, Beresford directed an adaptation of Henry Handel Richardson's novel The Getting of Wisdom (1977), also produced by Adams.

=== SAFC ===
Beresford signed a contract with the South Australian Film Corporation for whom he wrote and directed a thriller, Money Movers (1979), which was a box office disappointment. He did some uncredited directing on the SAFC's Blue Fin (1978), then co-wrote and directed Breaker Morant (1980). The latter film was a notable success at the box office and earned Beresford an Oscar nomination. It was widely seen in Hollywood and Beresford began to receive US offers.

Beresford directed The Club (1980), from another Williamson play, and Puberty Blues (1981).

=== Early US films ===
Beresford received an offer from EMI Films to direct Horton Foote's Tender Mercies (1983). Star Robert Duvall won a Best Actor Oscar for his performance and Beresford earned a Best Director nomination.

He followed it with King David (1985) starring Richard Gere, which was a notable box office failure.

Beresford returned to Australia to direct The Fringe Dwellers (1986), co-written with his first wife, Rhoisin Beresford. In the US he directed Crimes of the Heart (1986) from the play by Beth Henley, did a segment of the film Aria (1987), and did the comedy thriller Her Alibi (1989) with Tom Selleck.

=== Driving Miss Daisy ===
Beresford directed Driving Miss Daisy (1989) with Morgan Freeman and Jessica Tandy, based on the play by Alfred Uhry. It won the Academy Award for Best Picture, although Beresford was not nominated as director. The film was a commercial and critical success.

Asked if he minded not even being nominated for the Best Director Oscar for Driving Miss Daisy, Beresford said: "No, not at all. I didn't think it was that well directed. It was very well written. When the writing's that good, you've really just got to set the camera up and photograph it."

He directed Mister Johnson (1990) in Nigeria, with Edward Woodward; Black Robe (1991), an Australian-Canadian film based on the novel by Brian Moore; Rich in Love (1992), co-written by Uhry; A Good Man in Africa (1994) with Sean Connery from a novel by William Boyd, which in 2015 Beresford called his worst film; Silent Fall (1994), which was nominated for the Golden Bear at the 45th Berlin International Film Festival; and Last Dance (1996) with Sharon Stone.

He adapted but did not direct Curse of the Starving Class (1994).

Beresford returned to Australia to direct Paradise Road (1997), which was a commercial disappointment. He directed a documentary, Sydney: A Story of a City (1999), then had a hit with the thriller Double Jeopardy (1999).

=== Later films ===
Beresford made Bride of the Wind (2001); Evelyn (2002) with Pierce Brosnan; and And Starring Pancho Villa as Himself (2003) with Antonio Banderas.

He spent several years looking for financing for various projects before making The Contract (2006) with Freeman and Cusack. He followed it with a TV film Orpheus (2006) and returned to Australia to make Mao's Last Dancer (2009) which was also filmed in Houston, Texas.

Beresford's later credits include Peace, Love & Misunderstanding (2011) with Jane Fonda, the documentary H.H. Dalai Lama: Essence of Mahayana Buddhism (2011), the mini series Bonnie & Clyde (2013), Mr. Church (2016) with Eddie Murphy, an episode of the remake of Roots (2017), the TV movie Flint (2017) and the Australian film Ladies in Black (2018).

=== Opera ===
In addition to films, Bruce Beresford has also directed several operas and theatre productions. In 1996, he directed a Portland Opera (Oregon) production of the Stephen Sondheim musical Sweeney Todd: The Demon Barber of Fleet Street.

In 2016, he directed Benjamin Britten's opera Albert Herring for the Queensland Conservatorium of Music, in a production conducted by Nicholas Cleobury.

He often works with film editor Mark Warner. (See: List of film director and editor collaborations)

In 2012, he directed a production of Erich Wolfgang Korngold's opera Die tote Stadt for Opera Australia.

In 2018, he directed the Australian premiere of Rossini's Otello for Melbourne Opera.

=== Writing ===
Beresford is a contributor to The Spectator Australia.

== Memoir ==
In August 2007, he published a memoir, Josh Hartnett Definitely Wants To Do This... True Stories From A Life in the Screen Trade.

== Personal life ==
Beresford's second wife is novelist Virginia Duigan, sister of film director and editor John Duigan. He has five adult children and now works both in Australia and the United States.

=== Contemporaries and friends ===
Beresford attended the University of Sydney with critic and documentary maker Clive James, art critic and aficionado Robert Hughes, activist and author Germaine Greer, journalist Bob Ellis, poet Les Murray, and writer Mungo McCallum. His contemporary and friend, actor and theatre director John Bell, shared a house and also did some film acting. Beresford was close friends with Australian comedian, satirist and character actor Barry Humphries, best known for his on-stage/television alter ego Dame Edna Everage, and his family.

== Filmography ==
- The Adventures of Barry McKenzie (1972)
- Barry McKenzie Holds His Own (1974)
- Side by Side (1975)
- Don's Party (1977)
- The Getting of Wisdom (1978)
- Money Movers (1978)
- Blue Fin (1978) (with Carl Schultz)
- Breaker Morant (1980)
- The Club (1980)
- Puberty Blues (1981)
- Tender Mercies (1983)
- King David (1985)
- The Fringe Dwellers (1986)
- Crimes of the Heart (1986)
- Aria (1987)
- Her Alibi (1989)
- Driving Miss Daisy (1989)
- Mister Johnson (1990)
- Black Robe (1991)
- Rich in Love (1992)
- A Good Man in Africa (1994)
- Silent Fall (1994)
- Last Dance (1996)
- Paradise Road (1997)
- Sydney – A Story of a City (1999)
- Double Jeopardy (1999)
- Bride of the Wind (2001) (a. k. a. Die Windsbraut)
- Evelyn (2002)
- And Starring Pancho Villa as Himself (2003) (TV)
- The Contract (2006)
- Mao's Last Dancer (2009)
- Peace, Love & Misunderstanding (2011)
- Bonnie & Clyde (2013) (TV)
- Mr. Church (2016)
- Roots (2016) (TV)
- Flint (2017) (TV)
- Ladies in Black (2018)
- The Travellers (2025)

== Awards and nominations ==
Film Award	Year	Work	Category	Result
AACTA Awards	1977	Don's Party	Best Direction	Won
AACTA Awards	1980	Breaker Morant	Best Screenplay, Original or Adapted	Won
AACTA Awards	1980	Breaker Morant	Best Direction	Won
AACTA Awards	1981	The Club	Best Direction	Nominated
AACTA Awards	1986	The Fringe Dwellers	Best Screenplay, Original or Adapted	Won
AACTA Awards	1986	The Fringe Dwellers	Best Direction	Nominated
AACTA Awards	1992	Black Robe	Best Direction	Nominated
AACTA Awards	2009	Mao's Last Dancer	Best Direction	Nominated
AACTA Awards	2018	Ladies in Black	Best Adapted Screenplay	Nominated
AACTA Awards	2018	Ladies in Black	Best Direction	Nominated
AACTA Awards	2026	The Travellers	Best Direction	Nominated
AACTA Awards	2026	—N/a	Longford Lyell Award	Honoured
Academy Awards	1981	Breaker Morant	Best Adapted Screenplay	Nominated
Academy Awards	1984	Tender Mercies	Best Director	Nominated
BAFTA Film Awards	1991	Driving Miss Daisy	Best Direction	Nominated
BAFTA Film Awards	1991	Driving Miss Daisy	Best Film	Nominated
David di Donatello	1981	Breaker Morant	Best Foreign Screenplay	Nominated
Directors Guild of America Awards	1984	Tender Mercies	Outstanding Directing - Feature Film	Nominated
Genie Awards	1991	Black Robe	Best Director	Won
Golden Globe Awards	1984	Tender Mercies	Best Director - Motion Picture	Nominated

== Accolades received by Beresford's directed films ==
Year	Film	Academy Awards		BAFTAs		Golden Globes		AACTAs	
Year	Film	Nominations	Wins	Nominations	Wins	Nominations	Wins	Nominations	Wins
1976	Don's Party							8	6
1977	The Getting of Wisdom							5	1
1978	Money Movers							3	
1980	Breaker Morant	1				1		13	10
1980	The Club							7	
1983	Tender Mercies	5	2			5	1		
1986	The Fringe Dwellers							7	1
1986	Crimes of the Heart	3				2	1		
1989	Driving Miss Daisy	9	4	4	1	3	3		
1991	Black Robe							10	1
2009	Mao's Last Dancer							8	1
2018	Ladies in Black							11	4
Total		18	6	4	1	11	5	72	24

Directed Academy Award Performances

Under Beresford's direction, these actors have received Academy Award nominations and wins for their performances in these respective roles.

Year	Performer	Film	Result
Academy Award for Best Actor
1984	Robert Duvall	Tender Mercies	Won
1990	Morgan Freeman	Driving Miss Daisy	Nominated
Academy Award for Best Actress
1987	Sissy Spacek	Crimes of the Heart	Nominated
1990	Jessica Tandy	Driving Miss Daisy	Won
Academy Award for Best Supporting Actor
1990	Dan Aykroyd	Driving Miss Daisy	Nominated
Academy Award for Best Supporting Actress
1987	Tess Harper	Crimes of the Heart	Nominated
