= Stephen Wallace =

Australian director (born 1943)

Stephen Wallace A.M.
- Born: Stephen Henry Wallace; 23 December 1943 (age 82); New South Wales, Australia
- Education: University of Sydney
- Occupations: Director; screenwriter; producer; author; acting teacher
- Years active: 1969 to present
- Board member of: ASDACS - Chair (1995 - 2003), Board Member (2003 - 2026) The Australian Directors Guild - Founding Member, President (1991-2001), Treasurer (2000 - 2018), Life Member
- Spouse: Fiona Verge
- Children: Lucinda Verge-Wallace, Guy Verge-Wallace
- Awards: AFI Award, 1981 Best Short Fiction Film: 'Captives of Care' (1981) Television Society of Australia, 1985 Penguin Award for TV or Movie Director: 'Mail Order Bride' on ABC TV, ADG, 2012 Cecil Holmes Award, Order of Australia

Stephen Henry Wallace A.M. (born 23 December 1943) is an Australian film and television director, screenwriter, producer, published author and acting coach. He has directed eight feature films, nine telemovies, numerous short films, worked on multiple television series and has a small theatre company.

Wallace was noted for his work with emerging performers and his support of young talent. Several actors who later achieved wider recognition, including Bryan Brown to Russell Crowe and Naomi Watts, made early feature film or screen appearances in productions with which he was involved.

Over the course of his career, Wallace's films have been recognised with over 38 nominations at local and international film festivals. In 2005, Wallace was awarded an Order of Australia in the Queen's Birthday Honours List for his contributions to the Australian film and television industry as both a director, and founding member of the Australian Screen Directors' Association. In 2012, the ADG awarded Wallace the prestigious Cecil Holmes Award, presented in recognition of advocacy for, and services to directing.

As one of four founding signatories, alongside Gillian Armstrong, Phillip Noyce and James Ricketson, Wallace became President of the Australian Directors Guild between 1991 and 2000 and remains on the Board today as Treasurer. He currently sits as Chair of The Australian Screen Directors Collecting Society (ASDACS).

== Short films ==
Early in his career, Wallace worked at Film Australia as a production assistant and director of documentaries.

Wallace then made several short 16mm fiction films, including: The Look, Brittle Weather Journey (screened at Ann Arbor Film Festival and at the Sydney Filmmakers' Co-op, 1974), Break Up (a finalist in the Greater Union Awards at the 1976 Sydney Film Festival) and Con Man Harry (winner of the Experimental section of the Chicago Film Festival, 1980).

== Telemovies and documentaries ==
Wallace then transitioned into making a series of one hour telemovies and documentaries for Australian television networks. These included: the award winning Women of the Sun for SBS (1982); Quest Beyond Time for the Children's Television Foundation (1984); an ABC feature film Hunger (1987) for Jan Chapman; Gordon Bennett, a one hour drama for The Nine Network, as well as several documentaries for Seven Network.

== Feature films ==
The Love Letters from Teralba Road (1977)

His first short feature film was The Love Letters from Teralba Road (1977). Wallace found a number of letters in a Sydney flat in 1972 which had been written by a man living in Newcastle in 1959. He had beaten up his wife, who subsequently moved to Sydney and was asking for her forgiveness. Wallace drew inspiration from these to both write and direct the short film. The film is widely known as Bryan Brown's on-screen debut. In 1980 David Stratton called it, "not only the most moving love story given to us by the Australian cinema, but also probably the best featurette of the decade."

The film won three awards at the 1977 Film Institute Awards (Best Cinematography in a Non-Feature Film, Best Short Fiction Film, Special Award) and in 1978 the Interfilm Award at the Berlin International Film Festival.

Stir (1980)

His feature directorial debut took place with Stir in 1980. The New South Wales Film Corporation was looking at investing in additional features films made by directors in whom they saw potential. Wallace had just made the critically acclaimed one-hour drama The Love Letters from Teralba Road and was asked if he had any new projects. He told them about this prison drama.

The film, also starring Bryan Brown, was written by Bob Jewson and based upon his own experiences while incarcerated during the 1974 prison riots at Bathurst Correctional Complex and subsequent Royal Commission into New South Wales Prisons. The film was shot over five weeks in October and November 1979 in South Australia at an abandoned prison in Gladstone.

Of the experience, Wallace recalls:

"Bob Jewson said one thing - and I think this is what we tried to make the theme of the film, although it was very hidden - that riots don't happen out of the blue. The prison authorities make you believe that all these criminals that are incarcerated are at all times dangerous and they're trying to get out. But Bob said that's never true; most of them have accepted their lot and they're trying to serve their time. They only get into a riot situation when they're treated badly and unfairly over a long period. He said most people don't want a riot; they know what it's going to mean - longer in jail."

The firm premiered at the 1980 Cannes Film Festival, also showing at the 1980 Edinburgh International Film Festival (UK), 1980 San Francisco International Film Festival (USA), Canale 5 in Italy, and many more. At the 1980 Australian Film Institute Awards, Stir received 13 nominations but did not win any categories.

The Boy Who Had Everything (1986)

In 1984, Wallace wrote and directed his third feature film, The Boy Who Had Everything. The film began as autobiographical for Wallace but made some creative compromises in consultation with his Producers and Script Editors in the hope it would make the film more commercial. The film starred Sean Connery's first wife Diane Cilento and their son, Jason Connery - playing mother and son on-screen.

The film was first released at the 1985 Moscow Film Festival.

For Love Alone (1986)

In 1986, Wallace directed and adaptation of Christina Stead's novel, For Love Alone, in a film by the same title. Wallace also wrote the screenplay adaptation. The film starred critically acclaimed actors Helen Buday, Hugo Weaving and Sam Neill, as well as marking Australian actress Naomi Watts' feature film debut.

The film was a pet project for Producer Margaret Fink who took six years to raise financing. The bulk of the money came from a pre-sale to Greater Union and from UA. Fink had been impressed by Stir and asked Stephen Wallace to direct the feature. An earlier draft of the adaptation had been written, but neither Fink nor Wallace were happy with it so Wallace did the adaptation himself. Wallace says it took him three and a half years to write the script.

The film was entered into the 37th Berlin International Film Festival with Wallace being nominated for the prestigious Golden Berlin Bear Award, as well as receiving five nominations at the Australian Film Institute Awards.

Olive (1988)

Wallace made Olive in 1988. The film earned four nominations at the 1988 Australian Film Institute Awards, with Kerry McGuire winning Best Performance by an Actress in a Telefeature.

Blood Oath (1990)

In 1990, Wallace directed Blood Oath (known in some countries as Prisoners of the Sun). The film was co-written by Denis Whitburn and Brian A. Williams. The film is based on the real-life trial of Japanese soldiers for war crimes committed against Allied prisoners of war on the island of Ambon, in the Netherlands East Indies (Indonesia), such as the Laha massacre of 1942.

Blood Oath stars Bryan Brown, George Takei, Terry O'Quinn, John Bach, John Clarke, Deborah Kara Unger, John Polson, Nicholas Eadie, David Argue and Ray Barrett. The film is also widely known as the first film debut for both Russell Crowe and Jason Donovan. It was nominated for several 1990 Australian Film Institute Awards, including "Best Film". It won the AFI Awards for Best Achievement in Sound and Best Achievement in Costume Design.

Turtle Beach (1992)

Wallace's final feature film before taking a hiatus from directing was Turtle Beach. Wallace was hired because the financiers who had invested in his movie Blood Oath loved his work and saw him as a good choice. The screenplay was written by Ann Turner, based on the 1981 novel of the same name by Blanche d'Alpuget. The film stars Greta Scacchi and Joan Chen.

A Suburban Love Story (2018)

In 2014, it was announced that Wallace was directing again. The low budget film, The Body in the Yard (later changed to A Suburban Love Story), was set to begin shooting on 28 August 2014, with an all-Australian cast. This film is based on an Australian newspaper story Wallace read back in the 1980s or 90s, about the murder by a husband of his wife; the husband buried his murdered wife in the backyard and continued to live with his girlfriend in the same house.

== Television ==
Stephen Wallace has directed various TV series and nine telemovies, four of which were made for the Australian Broadcasting Commission (ABC).

Between 1985 and 1998, Wallace directed episodes of Women of the Sun, The Flying Doctors, Australians, Seven Deadly Sins, Twisted Tales and Water Rats, among others.

== Theatre and Developing Actors ==
From the onset of his career, Wallace has been widely known to have a passion for working with actors, both as a professional coach, in theatre, and to get the most out of his cast. Wallace has worked on and off as an acting teacher for Screenwise Australia for several years.

Many now established actors can attribute their first feature film, or on-screen debut to working with Wallace; from the likes of Bryan Brown to Russell Crowe, Naomi Watts and many others. Wallace has also worked with critically acclaimed actors Sam Neill, Hugo Weaving and Greta Scacchi.

Impulse Theatre Company

In taking a break from filmmaking, Wallace founded a small theatre company, Impulse Theatre where he ran a method acting workshop known as The Growtowski Workshop.

Through Impulse Theatre, Wallace produced several productions of Oedipus, Lysistrata, Cosi, Romeo and Juliet, As You Like It, Shoehorn Sonata, Away and more. He completed four productions for the Short and Sweet Festival at the Seymour Centre as well as creating a short film with the company Disconnected.

On Oedipus the King (Impulse Theatre Company, 2003), The Sydney Morning Herald wrote,

"This version, directed by Stephen Wallace, is billed as a "Grotowski workshop", in regards to the late Polish director's style. Audiences are welcome to turn up an hour early to watch the cast warm up. Often productions dedicated to a particular performance style can use the text as an excuse for stylistic pyrotechnics and barren "look at me" performance athletics.

Much guff has been opined about the revered Jerzy Grotowski but his key concerns were about simplicity (stripping away everything non-essential), the centrality of the actor to the creation of meaning, and ritualistic, essentialist physicality.

The Grotowski influence also shows in its careful but subtle physicality, an economy of character-identifying gesture and simple but affecting grouping of performers."

With Impulse Theatre Company, Wallace also directed 16 full-length plays from within the NSW school syllabus, taking the crew on tour to schools across regional parts of NSW to share his love of theatre with their students.

== Advocate for directors ==
During his career, Stephen Wallace has played an instrumental role in advocating for directorial rights, both in Australia and abroad, beginning as early as 1982.

As one of the original signatories to the ASDA Articles of Association (now known as the Australian Director's Guild) on 15 January 1982, Wallace and his team worked hard to build membership and fight for appropriate regulation and resources on top of advocating for better rights, opportunities and recognition for screen directors. After 40 years, the ADG now represents the interests of over 1,000 Screen Director members working across film, television, streaming and digital media.

In 1991, as President of ASDA, Wallace was determined to re-invigorate what the team had originally set out to do. Recognising their members’ interest in the art/craft of directing, he proposed the institution of a Directors Conference and Directors Discussion Screenings. During this period also, ASDA continued its participation in industry policy development with relevant government departments. In 1994, ASDA President Stephen Wallace, at the invitation of the late John Juliani of the DGC (Directors Guild of Canada) met in Toronto with the DGA (Directors Guild of America) and BECTU (Britain's Broadcasting, Entertainment, Cinematograph and Theatre Union), thus beginning a process of achieving closer relationships with overseas guilds. Subsequently, ASDA regularly participated in the annual International Directors' Guild Forum, an event which it hosted in Sydney in 1998.

Similarly, in 1995 ASDA formed ASDACS (the Australian Directors Collecting Society) after having been approached by the Société des Auteurs et Compositeurs Dramatiques to distribute money collected on behalf of directors from the sale of video tapes in France and formed further relationships with other European collecting societies. In recent years they have distributed over half a million dollars annually to their 800 director members in Australia and New Zealand.

Wallace remains on the board of the Australian Directors Guild and chairs the Australian Screen Directors' Collecting Society.

In his career, he's also spent five years as a Senior Project Manager for the Australian Film Commission.

== Awards ==
Stephen Wallace was awarded the A.M. (Order of Australia) in the 2005 Queen's Birthday Honours List for his contributions to the Australian film and television industry as a director and to the Australian Screen Directors' Association. In 2012, the ADG awarded Wallace the Cecil Holmes Award for Outstanding Contribution to the Australian Directors Guild.

His first film The Love Letters from Teralba Road, won the Interfilm Award at the 1977 Berlin International Film Festival and three Australian Academy of Cinema and Television Arts (AACTA) Awards (known then as the AFI Awards). He was awarded Best Short Fiction Film for Captives of Care at the 1981 AACTA Awards. His 1986 film For Love Alone was nominated for the Golden Berlin Bear at the 37th Berlin International Film Festival and his 1984 film, The Boy Who Had Everything, was nominated for the Golden Prize at the 14th Moscow International Film Festival.

== Filmography ==
- Two Australian Diary Items (1967) - documentary
- Westwood Retarded Girls' Home (1969) - documentary
- Eric Hiaiveta in Canberra (1972) - documentary
- Brittle Weather Journey (1973) - short
- Break Up (1975) - short
- The Love Letters from Teralba Road (1977) - short feature
- Stir (1980)
- The Boy Who Had Everything (1984)
- Hunger (1986) - TV film
- For Love Alone (1986)
- Olive (1988)
- Prisoners of the Sun/Blood Oath (1990)
- Turtle Beach (1992)
- A Suburban Love Story (2018)
