= Australian Film Institute Jury Prize =

Australian film award

The Australian Film Institute Jury Prize is an award in the annual Australian Film Institute Awards. It was awarded annually between 1976 and 1984.

== Previous winners ==
- 1976: Fred Schepisi (The Devil's Playground)
- 1977: Matt Carroll (Storm Boy)
- 1978: John Duigan (Mouth to Mouth)
- 1979: George Miller, Byron Kennedy (Mad Max)
- 1980: Don McLennan (Hard Knocks)
- 1981: Ned Lander, Graeme Isaac (Wrong Side of the Road)
- 1982: Peter Tammer (Journey to the End of Night)
- 1983: Peter Weir, Linda Hunt (The Year of Living Dangerously)
- 1984: Roger Savage
