= Break of Day (film) =

- Directed by: Ken Hannam
- Written by: Cliff Green
- Produced by: Patricia Lovell
- Starring: Sara Kestleman; Andrew McFarlane
- Cinematography: Russell Boyd
- Edited by: Max Lemon
- Music by: George Dreyfus
- Production company: Clare Beach Films
- Distributed by: Greater Union; Umbrella Entertainment
- Release date: 31 December 1976
- Running time: 112 mins
- Country: Australia
- Language: English
- Budget: A$500,000 or $540,000 or $615,000

Break of Day is a 1976 Australian film set immediately after World War I.

== Plot ==
Beginning on the shores of Gallipoli, at break of day during the invasion of the peninsula by Australian forces in the first world war this film then shifts to the quiet country town of Tetlow in 1920.

Where a restless young war veteran Tom Cooper (Andrew McFarlane) is distracted from rabbiting, his very pregnant wife and his memories when he meets Alice Hughes (Sara Kestelman), an artist with Bohemian ways.

When Alice's sophisticated wine-drinking city friends turn up and condescendingly observe a rural cricket match, Tom begins to understand that Alice sees the world differently, and he returns to his country lifestyle, sadder but perhaps also a little wiser, or at least more aware of himself and the larger world.

== Cast ==
- Sara Kestelman as Alice Hughes
- Andrew McFarlane as Tom Cooper
- Ingrid Mason as Beth
- Tony Barry as Joe
- Eileen Chapman as Susan
- John Bell as Arthur
- Ben Gabriel as Mr Evans
- Dennis Olsen as Roger
- Geraldine Turner as Sandy
- Maurie Fields as Lou
- Richard Morgan as John
- Malcolm Phillips as Robbie
- Patricia Lovell
- Marty Fields

== Production ==
The script was an original by Cliff Green who had adapted Picnic at Hanging Rock for Pat Lovell. Green gave her a copy of the script on the last day of Picnics shoot and she was immediately interested. Lovell:

While it isn't a 'women's film', it is the sort of film – like 'Picnic' – that women would like to go to with their husbands. We've had a lot of pornography and a lot of violence, and I think people are ready for a love story. This is a very real one. and even though it's set in 1920, it could happen at any time. It's a story with a tremendous amount of charm. Essentially what it says is that people can love more than one person, but be out of communication with one of them. I think a lot of people will identify with it.

Production company: Clare Beach Films Pty. Ltd.

Budget: A little more than A$500,000, with investments from GUO Film Distributors, the federal government investment body the Australian Film Commission, and $61,000/$65,000 from the Victorian government (producer Pat Lovell quoted in two different newspaper reports - it was the first investment in a feature film by the Victorian government, which set up the Victorian Film Corporation to handle the investment, but too late to get the VFC a head credit on the film). A Cinema Papers production survey, June–July 1976 listed the budget as $617,000, but in the next Sept-Oct 1976 edition, apologised to the producers of the film for typographical errors, and reported the budget as $507,000 Australian distributor: Greater Union Distributors

Australian release: world premiere Bercy Cinema Melbourne 31 December 1976; on television, Nine network, 13 July 1980.

One of Lovell's associates described the film as "boy meets girl, they fall in love, they kill each other. It doesn't pretend to be anything that's taxing on the brain. There's a beautiful setting and there's no hammer blow."

Shooting began in April 1976 in and near the old gold-mining town of Maldon in central Victoria, in which the main part of the shoot five weeks. The isolated stone Cottage, which serves as the bush hideaway for the main female character and artist, "Alice", is a few kilometres out of town. However what was not known at the time was that this Cottage once called "Crofthill" belonged to a well known family in the area, The 'Waterson's'. In this case Ernest Edward Waterson and his wife Sarah Margaret (Nee Bishop). Ernest was a carpenter and farmer but he also served in the Boer War in the 2nd Mount Rifles and travelled widely with and without the family. Unfortunately Ernest and Sarah both died within a year of each other at Crofthill, from tuberculosis, leaving family to raise their children and letting Crofthill run into disrepair and then ruin.

The Gallipoli flashback scenes were shot at Portsea in Victoria.

Hannam's wife Wendy Dickson worked as production designer.

The film is dated by the Oxford and other databases as 1976, no doubt because the film was given its premiere release on the last day of the year, but the copyright notice at the end of the film nominates 1977 as the year of production. Occasionally producers will add a year when preparing final credits, especially if on the cusp between two years - better fifty years of copyright from 1977 than from 1976. As this site uses the film's copyright notice as the key indicator of production date, this film is dated to 1977.

The theme song, "Australia Will Be There" was sung by the Marist Singer's of Eastwood (Marist Singers of NSW) conducted by Paul Bateman OAM. A boys choir from Sydney, NSW.

== Reception ==
The film received some good reviews and was popular in Melbourne but performed poorly in Sydney and failed to recoup its budget.

Cliff Green later published a novelisation of the script.

== Home media ==
Break of Day was released on DVD by Umbrella Entertainment in January 2010. The DVD includes the theatrical trailer as a special feature.
