= Winter of Our Dreams =

- DVD cover
- Directed by: John Duigan
- Written by: John Duigan
- Produced by: Richard Mason
- Starring: Judy Davis; Bryan Brown; Baz Luhrmann
- Cinematography: Tom Cowan
- Edited by: Henry Dangar
- Music by: Sharon Calcraft
- Release date: 31 July 1981
- Running time: 89 minutes
- Country: Australia
- Language: English
- Budget: AU$320,000
- Box office: $959,000 (Australia)

Winter of Our Dreams is a 1981 Australian drama film directed by John Duigan. Judy Davis won the Best Actress in a Lead Role in the AFI Awards for her performance in the film. The film was nominated in six other categories also. It was also entered into the 13th Moscow International Film Festival where Judy Davis won the award for Best Actress.

== Plot ==
Rob (Bryan Brown), a bookshop owner, hears of the suicide of an old girlfriend Lisa (Margie McCrae). While investigating the case he meets Lou (Judy Davis), a prostitute and old friend of Lisa's.

== Cast ==
- Judy Davis as Lou
- Bryan Brown as Rob
- Cathy Downes as Gretel
- Mercia Deane-Johns as Angela
- Baz Luhrmann as Pete
- Peter Mochrie as Tim
- Mervyn Drake as Mick
- Margie McCrae as Lisa Blaine
- Joy Hruby as Marge
- Kim Deacon as Michelle
- Gia Carides
- Caz Lederman as Jenny
- Jan Adele as Woman

== Production ==
In the late 1970s Duigan wrote a script called Someone Left the Cake Out in the Rain about a European anti-nuclear campaigner who comes to Australia and meets a 60s radical turned yuppie. The film was never made but the former radical character was used in Winter of Our Dreams.

There were three weeks of rehearsals and five weeks of shooting in Kings Cross and Balmain in Sydney, Australia.

== Box office ==
Winter of Our Dreams was popular, grossing $959,000 at the box office in Australia, which is equivalent to $3,107,160 in 2009 dollars.

== See also ==
- Cinema of Australia
