= Let the Balloon Go =

- Directed by: Oliver Howes
- Written by: Cliff Green; Oliver Howes; Richard Mason
- Based on: novel by Ivan Southall
- Produced by: Richard Mason; Hal and Jim McElroy, associate producers
- Starring: Robert Bettles; Janet Kingsbury; John Ewart
- Cinematography: Dean Semler
- Edited by: Max Lemon
- Music by: George Dreyfus
- Production company: Film Australia
- Distributed by: 20th Century-Fox
- Release date: 16 December 1976
- Running time: 92 mins
- Country: Australia
- Language: English
- Budget: AU$400,000 or $285,000

Let the Balloon Go is a 1976 Australian children's film about a young boy with polio in 1917.

== Plot ==
In 1917 rural New South Wales, a young boy with polio struggles to break free of his overprotective mother.

== Cast ==
- Robert Bettles as John Sumner
- Jan Kingsbury as Mrs Sumner
- John Ewart as Constable Baird
- Bruce Spence as Acting Fire Chief Gifford
- Ray Barrett as Dr McLeod
- Nigel Lovell
- Ben Gabriel as Mr Sumner

== Production ==
The film was shot near the town of Carcoar.

== Reception ==
The film sold widely overseas including to the United States.
