= The Love Letters from Teralba Road =

- Title card
- Directed by: Stephen Wallace
- Written by: Stephen Wallace
- Produced by: Richard Brennan
- Starring: Kris McQuade; Bryan Brown; Gia Carides
- Cinematography: Tom Cowan
- Edited by: Henry Dangar
- Music by: Ralph Schneider
- Production company: The Australian Film Commission
- Release date: 26 July 1977
- Running time: 50 minutes
- Country: Australia
- Language: English
- Budget: AU$25,000

The Love Letters from Teralba Road is a 1977 Australian short film directed by Stephen Wallace. In 1980 David Stratton called it "not only the most moving love story given to us by the Australian cinema, but also probably the best featurette of the decade".

== Plot ==
Len (Bryan Brown) and his wife Barbara (Kris McQuade) have separated after he beat her in a drunken rage. He tries to get her back with a series of letters.

== Cast ==
- Kris McQuade as Barbara
- Bryan Brown as Len
- Gia Carides as Maureen
- Joy Hruby as Len's Mother
- Kevin Leslie as Barbara's Father
- Ashe Venn as Norma
- Don Chapman as Foreman

== Production ==
Wallace found a number of letters in a Sydney flat in 1972 which had been written by a man living in Newcastle in 1959. He had beaten up his wife, who subsequently moved to Sydney, and was asking for her forgiveness. Wallace drew from these to write and direct the short film. The film is Bryan Brown's screen debut.

The budget was provided in part by the Creative Development Branch of the Australian Film Commission.

The film won three awards at the 1977 AFI Awards (Best Cinematography in a Non-Feature Film, Best Short Fiction Film, Special Award) and in 1978 the Interfilm Award at the Berlin International Film Festival.

The original woman to whom the letters had been written was tracked down by a journalist and was upset by the film and threatened to sue. She eventually agreed not to after seeing the movie and meeting Wallace.
