= The Devil's Playground (1976 film) =

1976 film by Fred Schepisi

- Video cover
- Directed by: Fred Schepisi
- Written by: Fred Schepisi
- Produced by: Fred Schepisi
- Starring: Arthur Dignam; Nick Tate; Simon Burke
- Cinematography: Ian Baker
- Edited by: Brian Kavanagh
- Music by: Bruce Smeaton
- Production company: The Film House
- Distributed by: Fred Schepisi; Umbrella Entertainment
- Release date: 12 August 1976
- Running time: 107 minutes
- Country: Australia
- Language: English
- Budget: A$306,000 or $298,000
- Box office: A$334,000 (Australia)

The Devil's Playground is a 1976 Australian drama film written, produced and directed by Fred Schepisi. It is a semi-autobiographical film which tells the story of a boy growing up and going to school in a Catholic juniorate administered by the Little Brothers of Mary. Its focus is on the trials of the flesh and the tensions that arise, for both Brothers and students, from the religious injunction to control one's sexuality. It is considered part of the Australian New Wave film genre.

== Premise ==
In August 1953, the 13-year-old Tom Allen attends a Catholic juniorate in Melbourne, Australia. Students and Brothers face individual challenges of faith and self-restraint.

== Cast ==
- Arthur Dignam as Brother Francine
- Nick Tate as Brother Victor
- Simon Burke as Tom Allen
- Charles McCallum as Brother Sebastian
- John Frawley as Brother Celian
- Jonathan Hardy as Brother Arnold
- Gerry Duggan as Father Hanrahan
- Peter Cox as Brother James
- Thomas Keneally as Father Marshall
- Sheila Florance as Mrs Sullivan
- John Diedrich as Fitz
- Alan Cinis as Waite
- Richard Morgan as Smith
- Jeremy Kewley as Thompson

== Production ==
The screenplay was based on Schepisi's own experience attending a Catholic juniorate and took him five years to write. The film financing took three years to arrange, eventually coming from the Australian Film Commission ($100,000) and the Film House, Schepisi's own company ($154,000), with the balance coming from private investment.

It was shot in 1975 mostly at Werribee Park near Melbourne.

== Recognition ==
The film won the 1976 Australian Film Institute Award for Best Film, Best Direction, Best Lead Actor for both Simon Burke and Nick Tate, Best Screenplay, Best Achievement in Cinematography, and the Jury Prize.

The Devil's Playground was initially not released in theatres in the United States, but after director Fred Schepisi acquired greater overseas fame with The Chant of Jimmie Blacksmith and Barbarosa, it was brought to the U.S. in 1982. Reviewing the film on the American TV show Sneak Previews, Gene Siskel and Roger Ebert said it remained a compelling example of Schepisi's work, and gave it two "yes" votes. They commented that it stands out from similar films in that it does not focus solely on the subject of sex, and that it addresses the struggles of the brothers at the school as well as the students.

== Box office ==
The Devil's Playground grossed $334,000 at the box office in Australia, which is equivalent to $2,157,500 in 2020 dollars. According to Schepisi, the movie almost got its money back.

== Home media ==
The Devil's Playground was released on DVD with a new print by Umbrella Entertainment in November 2008. The DVD is compatible with all region codes and includes special features such as the theatrical trailer, an interview with Fred Schepisi, and audio commentary with Fred Schepisi. This film was released on Blu-ray by Umbrella Entertainment in June 2014, with extras.

== See also ==
- Cinema of Australia
- Devil's Playground (TV series)
