= Greenkeeping =

- Directed by: David Caesar
- Written by: David Caesar
- Starring: Mark Little; Lisa Hensley
- Release date: 1992
- Country: Australia
- Language: English
- Budget: A$1 million
- Box office: A$17,100 (Australia)

Greenkeeping is a 1992 Australian film directed by David Caesar.

== Cast ==
- Mark Little as Lenny
- Lisa Hensley as Sue
- Max Cullen as Tom
- Jan Adele as Doreen
- Gia Carides as Gina
- Syd Conabere as Milton
- Robyn Nevin as Mum
- Willie Fennel as Old Player
- David Wenham as Trevor
- Rob Steele as Bob

== Production ==
Caesar had originally wanted to make his feature debut with another script he had written, Prime Mover. However, it was expensive to produce, so he decided to make the cheaper Greenkeeping instead after having a successful reading of the script at the Harold Park Hotel.

Caesar contrasted Greenkeeping with Prime Mover, which was about a truck driver:

With Greenkeeping, I tried to do something about a character who was trying to go for a far less masculine lifestyle, a character who was literally doing the best he could within a domestic world; about trying to make his relationship, a very difficult relationship, with his wife work; about trying to do a job that he wasn't very good at as best he could; about trying to deal with problems like that. I think it's important to tell more stories like that. So it's about a guy who's doing the best he can. And I'm interested in telling stories like that, but on different levels.

The film was funded by the Australian Film Commission.
