= Blood Oath (film) =

- Theatrical release poster
- Directed by: Stephen Wallace
- Written by: Denis Whitburn; Brian A. Williams
- Produced by: Charles Waterstreet; Denis Whitburn
- Starring: Bryan Brown; George Takei; Terry O'Quinn; John Polson; Nicholas Eadie; Toshi Shioya; Deborah Unger; Ray Barrett; Jason Donovan
- Cinematography: Russell Boyd
- Edited by: Nicholas Beauman
- Music by: David McHugh
- Production company: Sovereign Pictures
- Distributed by: Village Roadshow Pictures
- Release dates: 26 July 1990 (Australia); 26 July 1990 (U.S.); 15 March 1991 (UK)
- Running time: 108 minutes
- Country: Australia
- Languages: English; Japanese
- Budget: A$10 million
- Box office: A$707,194 (Australia)

Blood Oath, known in some countries as Prisoners of the Sun, is a 1990 Australian drama film directed by Stephen Wallace and co-written by Denis Whitburn and Brian A. Williams. The film stars Bryan Brown, George Takei, Terry O'Quinn, John Bach, John Clarke, Deborah Kara Unger, Russell Crowe, John Polson, Nicholas Eadie, David Argue and Ray Barrett. The film is based on the real-life trial of Japanese soldiers for war crimes committed against Allied prisoners of war on the island of Ambon, in the Netherlands East Indies (Indonesia), such as the Laha massacre of 1942.

The film was the debut for Crowe, Unger and Jason Donovan in minor roles. It was nominated for several AFI Awards in 1990, including "Best Film". It won the AFI Awards for "Best Achievement in Sound" and "Best Achievement in Costume Design".

== Plot ==
At the end of the Second World War on Ambon Island, Australian troops liberate a prisoner-of-war camp and are told by the survivors that their Japanese captors had engaged in systemic beatings, torture, and executions. Shortly thereafter, a large mass grave of beheaded Australian prisoners is found in the forest outside the camp. The camp commander, Captain Ikeuchi, denies all knowledge of the killings by simply repeating "I know nothing of any executions". Meanwhile, the Australians issue a warrant for the Japanese officer in charge of the region, Vice-Admiral Baron Takahashi, who is then brought to the island to stand trial.

Takahashi denies all knowledge of the executions, saying he was not present when they took place and that Captain Ikeuchi never advised him about the mass grave in the forest. In a cold exchange later that night in the prisoner barracks, Takahashi refuses to speak to Ikeuchi, simply saying "there is nothing to discuss". When the Australian prosecutor, Captain Cooper, approaches Ikeuchi to testify against Takahashi, who is obviously trying to shift the blame to Ikeuchi for the crimes on Ambon, Ikeuchi refuses by saying his honor will not permit him to do so.

Meanwhile, Takahashi's lawyer skillfully portrays his client as a sophisticated British educated Japanese officer who had actually respected the Australians. Seeing his case failing, Captain Cooper then learns about a secret court martial in which Takahashi summarily ordered the deaths of four Australian aircrew members who had been on a reconnaissance flight. Cooper pledges to find the bodies of the executed pilots and puts one of the pilot's brothers on the witness stand who directly implicates both Takahashi and Ikeuchi.

It is then revealed by an American intelligence officer, Major Beckett, that Takahashi has agreed to testify against high ranking Japanese war criminals in Tokyo and that he is also to assume a position in the post-war Japanese government. The implication is clear that the verdict has already been determined and Takahashi is found not guilty on all charges and released.

Captain Cooper, not willing to give up his case, beats a confession out of Ikeuchi who admits that the court martial of the airmen had taken place and names a signals officer, Lieutenant Tanaka, as one of the participants. Tanaka takes the stand and admits the court martial happened, and that Takahashi had ordered the deaths of both the airmen and the prisoners killed at the mass grave. Ikeuchi then commits suicide by seppuku, leaving Tanaka to take full blame for the deaths of the Australian airmen.

Captain Cooper tells the court that Tanaka was merely a pawn and should be spared, but Tanaka is found guilty and sentenced to death. He is taken to the forest the next morning and calmly takes his place for execution after receiving last rites. He is then executed by the firing squad, many of whom show emotion at killing a prisoner who they believed to be innocent.

== Cast ==
- Bryan Brown as Captain Cooper
- George Takei as Vice-Admiral Baron Takahashi
- Terry O'Quinn as Major Beckett
- John Bach as Major Roberts
- Sokyu Fujita as Shinnosuke Matsugae
- Tetsu Watanabe as Captain Ikeuchi
- John Clarke as Sheedy
- Deborah Unger as Sister Littell
- John Polson as Private Jimmy Fenton
- Russell Crowe as Lieutenant Corbett
- Nicholas Eadie as Sergeant Keenan
- Jason Donovan as Private Talbot
- Toshi Shioya as Lieutenant Tanaka
- Ray Barrett as President of the Bench
- Kevin Paul Weeks as the Cook
- David Argue as Flight Lieutenant Eddy Fenton

== Production ==
The film was the idea of Brian Williams, who was the son of Captain John Williams, who had prosecuted Japanese officers in charge of the POW camp at Ambon during the war. He was impressed with the TV series The Last Bastion and approached Denis Whitburn, who had written it with David Williamson, and they wrote the script and produced together. Bryan Brown and Stephen Wallace then came on board the project (although at one point Geoff Murphy was also considered as director).

The movie was shot at the Village-Warner Film Studio on the Gold Coast.

== Box office ==
Blood Oath opened on 60 screens in Australia and grossed A$310,281 in its opening week finishing fourth place at the box office and went on to gross A$707,194 at the box office in Australia. Stephen Wallace has said he thought the film would have been better had the writers been more accurate as the truth was more interesting.

The writers announced plans to follow up Blood Oath with a $20 million film about the Cowra breakout, Giants at Dawn, but this was not made.

== See also ==
- Dutch East Indies campaign
- Japanese war crimes
- Cinema of Australia
