= Don McLennan =

Australian filmmaker

- Born: Australia
- Occupation: Film director

Don McLennan is an Australian film director, scriptwriter and producer.

== Early life and education ==
McLennan was born in Leeton, NSW, Australia. He attended Marist College, a boarding school in Tasmania. After he graduated, he went to work at the Australian Broadcasting Corporation in 1967. He worked for Australian production companies such as Fauna Productions, Grundy Productions, Crawford Productions, Lewis Young Productions as an assistant director and producer before making his first film, a short drama, Point of Departure in 1972.

In 1975 he produced his first feature film Apostasy. He established his name in the Australian film industry with the award-winning feature Hard Knocks which he co-wrote, co-produced and directed. Hard Knocks won the Jury prize at the 1980 AFI Australian Film Awards, as well as Best Actress for Tracy Mann.

The following year he started a production company, Ukiyo Films, with Zbigniew Friedrich. Over the next eight years the company produced three feature films and numerous documentaries.

In 1989 he directed Mull which won the AFI Members Award for Best Film and the Best Actress for Tracy Mann. The film was invited to the London Film Festival and Montreal Film Festival.

In 1985 he started Ukiyo Theatre with Friedrich. They co-produced a trio of plays by Samuel Beckett, Waiting For Godot, Krapp's Last Tape and Endgame performed by the American theater group San Quentin Drama Workshop. The plays were directed by Beckett and toured Australia, Singapore and Italy. In 1990 McLennan moved to Los Angeles and established himself as a scriptwriter. He wrote scripts for Dimension Films, and several other leading production companies. He continues to direct documentaries, PSA's for Federal and State Elections, and TV reality programs.

== Select credits ==
- The Intruders (feature) (1968) Assistant Director
- Blind Date (Game Show) (1969) Assistant producer
- Division Four (TV Series)(1970) Assistant Director
- Happening 73 (TV Music Program) (1973) Assistant Producer
- Point of Departure (short) (1973) Writer/Director
- Boss (short) (1976) Producer
- Apostasy (feature) (1978) Producer
- Hard Knocks (feature) (1980) Co-Writer/Co-Producer/Director
- Find Out, Talk About (documentary) (1981) Director
- Fabulous Fifties (documentary) (1982) Writer/Director
- River of Giants (documentary) (1983) Director
- On the Road With Circus Oz (documentary) (1984) Producer
- Artist In The Community (documentary) (1985) Producer/Director
- Beckett Directs Beckett (theater) (1985) Producer
- Slate, Wyn & Me (feature) (1987) Writer/Director
- Mull (feature) (1988) Director
- Breakaway (feature) (1990) Producer/Director
- Men of the Forest (documentary) 2000 Director
- Las Vegas Constables (pilot) (2008) Producer/Director
