= The Last Days of Chez Nous =

- Region 2 DVD cover
- Directed by: Gillian Armstrong
- Written by: Helen Garner
- Produced by: Jan Chapman
- Starring: Lisa Harrow; Bruno Ganz; Kerry Fox; Miranda Otto
- Cinematography: Geoffrey Simpson
- Edited by: Nicholas Beauman; Offshoot Films
- Music by: Paul Grabowsky
- Distributed by: Fine Line Features; Umbrella Entertainment
- Release date: 8 October 1992
- Running time: 93 minutes
- Country: Australia
- Language: English

The Last Days of Chez Nous is a 1992 Australian drama film directed by Gillian Armstrong and written by Helen Garner. The film stars Bruno Ganz as the Frenchman JP, New Zealand actor Kerry Fox as the impulsive younger sister, and Lisa Harrow as her older sibling. The cast also includes Miranda Otto and Bill Hunter.

== Plot ==
Made in a style that emphasises naturalism over melodrama, the film centres on what happens after Vicki (Kerry Fox) arrives at the house of her older sister Beth (Lisa Harrow), whose French husband (Bruno Ganz) falls for her.

== Cast ==
- Lisa Harrow as Beth
- Bruno Ganz as J.P.
- Kerry Fox as Vicki
- Miranda Otto as Annie
- Kiri Paramore as Tim
- Bill Hunter as Doug, Beth's Father
- Lex Marinos as Angelo
- Mickey Camilleri as Sally
- Lynne Murphy as Beth's Mother
- Claire Haywood as Janet
- Leanne Bundy as Susie
- Wilson Alcorn as Cafe Dero

== Production ==
Helen Garner had written her first script for Jan Chapman, 2 Friends. The two of them worked on the idea of Chez Nous for a number of years before developing it into a screenplay. Chapman then approached Gillian Armstrong who said:

I really loved it because I love Helen's writing. I think she has incredibly acute observation of people and wonderful poetry in her writing. I did think the biggest challenge was that so much was in one house, but I took that on board and thought, well, we'll just have to do everything possible to make people still feel they're watching a movie. After all, the house is also a character in the story.

The film was entirely funded by the Film Fund of the Film Finance Corporation. Armstrong made the movie straight after Fires Within and enjoyed it much more because the Hollywood film had been such a bad experience.

== Release and reception ==
The film opened in Sydney on 8 October 1992 at Greater Union Pitt Centre, Academy Twin and GU Mosman, and the same day in Melbourne at Village Rivoli Twin and Forest Hill Showcase. Lisa Harrow won the Australian Film Institute Award for Best Actress in a Leading Role, and the film was nominated for the AFI's Best Picture award. The film was entered into the 42nd Berlin International Film Festival.

The film held an 83% "Fresh" rating on Rotten Tomatoes as of October 2019, based on 12 reviews.

The Last Days of Chez Nous grossed $1,018,866 at the box office in Australia. Commercially, it was the most successful of the Film Finance Fund's "Chook Raffle" slate of five films.

== See also ==
- Cinema of Australia
