= List of awards and nominations received by Baz Luhrmann =

List of Baz Luhrmann awards
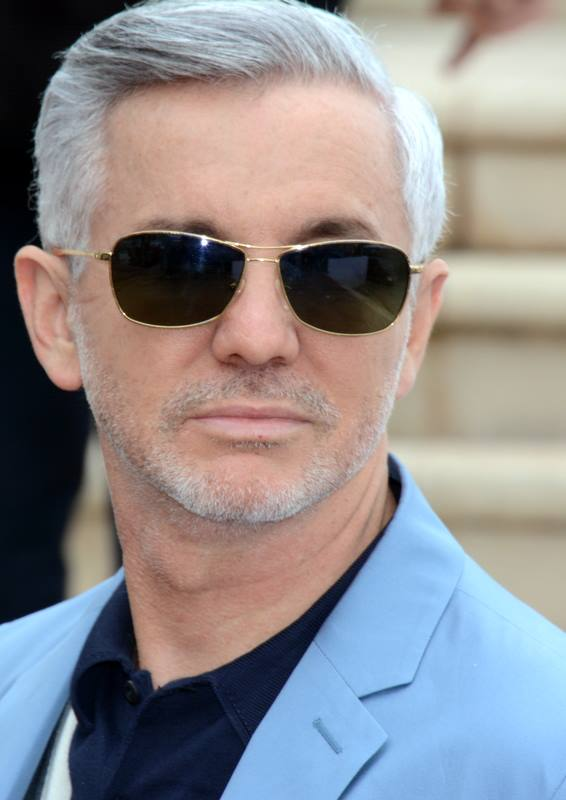
- Luhrmann at the Cannes Film Festival in 2013
Award	Wins	Nominations
Academy Awards	0	2
AACTA Awards	6	12
BAFTA Awards	2	7
Golden Globe Awards	1	5
Grammy Awards	0	3
Tony Awards	1	3

The following is a list of awards and nominations received by director Baz Luhrmann.

Luhrmann has received various awards for his film projects. This includes an Academy Award nomination for Best Picture as a producer of Moulin Rouge! (2001). He has also received nine Australian Academy of Cinema and Television Arts Award nominations winning four times for Strictly Ballroom (1992), and The Great Gatsby (2013). He also received seven British Academy Film Award nominations winning Best Director and Best Screenplay for Romeo + Juliet (1996). He has also received a Golden Globe Award nomination.

He has also earned three Grammy Award nominations, two for Best Compilation Soundtrack for Visual Media for Moulin Rouge! Music from Baz Luhrmann's Film in 2002, and The Great Gatsby: Music from Baz Luhrmann's Film in 2014, and a nomination for Best Musical Theater Album for Moulin Rouge! in 2020. For his work on the Broadway stage he has received two Tony Award nominations for La bohème in 2003, and another nomination for Best Musical for Moulin Rouge! in 2020.

== Major associations ==
=== Academy Awards ===
Moulin Rouge! was nominated for Best Picture at the 74th Academy Awards. Luhrmann was not nominated for Best Director, prompting host Whoopi Goldberg to remark, "I guess [it] just directed itself."

Year	Category	Nominated work	Result	Ref.
2002	Best Picture	Moulin Rouge!	Nominated	
2023	Best Picture	Elvis	Nominated	

=== Australian Academy Awards ===
Luhrmann has received six awards from twelve Australian Academy of Cinema and Television Arts (AACTA) Awards nominations.

Year	Category	Nominated work	Result	Ref.
1992	Best Director	Strictly Ballroom	Won	
1992	Best Screenplay	Strictly Ballroom	Won	
1997	Best Foreign Film	Romeo + Juliet	Nominated	
2001	Best Direction	Moulin Rouge!	Nominated	
2001	Best Film	Moulin Rouge!	Nominated	
2009	Best Original Score	Australia	Nominated	
2009	News Limited Readers' Choice Award	Australia	Nominated	
2014	Best Direction	The Great Gatsby	Won	
2014	Best Film	The Great Gatsby	Won	
2022	Best Film	Elvis	Won	
2022	Best Direction	Elvis	Won	
2022	Best Screenplay	Elvis	Nominated	

=== British Academy Film Awards ===
Luhrmann has received two awards from eight British Academy Film Award nominations.

Year	Category	Nominated work	Result	Ref.
1993	Best Film	Strictly Ballroom	Nominated	
1993	Best Adapted Screenplay	Strictly Ballroom	Nominated	
1998	David Lean Award for Direction	Romeo + Juliet	Won	
1998	Best Adapted Screenplay	Romeo + Juliet	Won	
2002	Best Film	Moulin Rouge!	Nominated	
2002	David Lean Award for Direction	Moulin Rouge!	Nominated	
2002	Best Original Screenplay	Moulin Rouge!	Nominated	
2023	Best Film	Elvis	Nominated	

=== Golden Globe Awards ===
Luhrmann has received one award from five Golden Globe Award nominations.

Year	Category	Nominated work	Result	Ref.
1994	Best Picture - Musical/Comedy (Note: Shared with other producers.)	Strictly Ballroom	Nominated	
2002	Best Picture - Musical/Comedy	Moulin Rouge!	Won	
2002	Best Director, Motion Picture	Moulin Rouge!	Nominated	
2023	Best Picture - Drama (Note: Shared with other producers.)	Elvis	Nominated	
2023	Best Director, Motion Picture	Elvis	Nominated	

=== Grammy Awards ===
Luhrmann has been specifically been nominated four times for Grammy Awards, with additional accolades for songs on the albums he has produced for his films, including wins for Lady Marmalade at 2002's Grammy's (Grammy Award for Best Pop Collaboration with Vocals), as well as nominations for Young and Beautiful for the Grammy Award for Best Song Written for Visual Media the 2014 Grammy's.

Year	Category	Nominated work	Result	Ref.
2002	Best Compilation Soundtrack for Visual Media	Moulin Rouge! Music from Baz Luhrmann's Film	Nominated	
2014	Best Compilation Soundtrack for Visual Media	The Great Gatsby: Music from Baz Luhrmann's Film	Nominated	
2020	Best Musical Theater Album	Moulin Rouge! The Musical	Nominated	
2023	Best Compilation Soundtrack for Visual Media	Elvis	Nominated	

=== Tony Awards ===
Luhrmann has specifically been nominated for three Tony Awards, winning once. In addition, his production of La Boheme also won awards for Best Scenic Design and Best Lighting Design at the 57th Tony Awards.

Year	Category	Nominated work	Result	Ref.
2003	Best Direction of a Musical	La bohème	Nominated	
2003	Best Revival of a Musical	La bohème	Nominated	
2020	Best Musical	Moulin Rouge!	Won	

== Miscellaneous awards ==
=== ARIA Music Awards ===
The ARIA Music Awards is an annual awards ceremony that recognises excellence, innovation, and achievement across all genres of Australian music. They commenced in 1987.

Year	Nominee / work	Award	Result	Ref.
1998	"Now Until the Break of Day"	Best Video	Won	

=== AFI Awards ===
Year	Category	Nominated work	Result	Ref.
2001	Movie of the Year	Moulin Rouge!	Nominated	

=== Australians in Film ===
Year	Category	Nominated work	Result	Ref.
2013	Orry-Kelly Award		Won	

=== Berlin International Film Festival ===
Year	Category	Nominated work	Result	Ref.
1997	Alfred Bauer Prize	Romeo + Juliet	Won	
1997	Golden Bear	Romeo + Juliet	Nominated	

=== Bodil Awards ===
Year	Category	Nominated work	Result	Ref.
2002	Best Non-American Film	Moulin Rouge!	Nominated	

=== Bogotá Film Festival ===
Year	Category	Nominated work	Result	Ref.
1994	Golden Precolumbian Circle for Best Film	Strictly Ballroom	Nominated	

=== Cannes Film Festival ===
Year	Category	Nominated work	Result	Ref.
1992	Award of the Youth	Strictly Ballroom	Won	
2001	Palme d'Or	Moulin Rouge!	Nominated	

=== Capri Hollywood International Film Festival ===
Year	Category	Nominated work	Result	Ref.
2022	Best Picture	Elvis	Won	
2022	Best Director	Elvis	Won	

=== César Awards ===
Year	Category	Nominated work	Result	Ref.
2002	Best Foreign Film	Moulin Rouge!	Nominated	

=== Chicago Film Critics Association Awards ===
Year	Category	Nominated work	Result	Ref.
2001	Best Director	Moulin Rouge!	Nominated	

=== Clio Awards ===
Year	Category	Nominated work	Result	Ref.
2016	Honorary Award		Won	

=== Critics' Choice Movie Awards ===
Year	Category	Nominated work	Result	Ref.
2002	Best Director	Moulin Rouge!	Won	
2023	Best Picture	Elvis	Nominated	
2023	Best Director	Elvis	Nominated	

=== Drama Desk Award ===
Year	Category	Nominated work	Result	Ref.
2003	Outstanding Revival of a Musical	La Boheme	Nominated	
2003	Outstanding Director of a Musical	La Boheme	Nominated	

=== Directors Guild of America Awards ===
Year	Category	Nominated work	Result	Ref.
2002	Outstanding Directing – Feature Film	Moulin Rouge!	Nominated	

=== Empire Awards ===
Year	Category	Nominated work	Result	Ref.
2002	Best Director	Moulin Rouge!	Won	

=== European Film Awards ===
Year	Category	Nominated work	Result	Ref.
1997	Best Non-European Film	Strictly Ballroom	Won	
2001	Best Non-European Film	Moulin Rouge!	Won	

=== Film Critics Circle of Australia Awards ===
Year	Category	Nominated work	Result	Ref.
2002	Best Screenplay - Original	Moulin Rouge!	Nominated	
2002	Best Director	Moulin Rouge!	Won	
2009	Best Film	Australia	Nominated	

=== Hollywood Critics Association ===
Year	Category	Nominated work	Result	Ref.
2022	Best Picture	Elvis	Nominated	
2022	Best Director	Elvis	Nominated	

=== Hollywood Film Festival ===
Year	Category	Nominated work	Result	Ref.
2001	Hollywood Movie of the Year	Moulin Rouge!	Won	

=== Hollywood Music in Media Awards ===
Year	Category	Nominated work	Result	Ref.
2022	Music Themed Film, Biopic or Musical	Elvis	Nominated	

=== Inside Film Awards ===
Year	Category	Nominated work	Result	Ref.
2001	Best Feature Film	Moulin Rouge!	Nominated	
2001	Best Direction	Moulin Rouge!	Nominated	

=== Italian National Syndicate of Film Journalists ===
Year	Category	Nominated work	Result	Ref.
2002	Best Foreign Director	Moulin Rouge!	Nominated	

=== London Film Critics' Circle ===
Year	Category	Nominated work	Result	Ref.
1993	Newcomer of the Year	Strictly Ballroom	Won	
1998	Director of the Year	Romeo + Juliet	Nominated	

=== Love is Folly International Film Festival ===
Year	Category	Nominated work	Result	Ref.
1993	Golden Aphrodite	Strictly Ballroom	Won	

=== MTV Movie & TV Awards ===
Year	Category	Nominated work	Result	Ref.
1997	Movie of the Year	Romeo + Juliet	Nominated	

=== Online Film Critics Society Awards ===
Year	Category	Nominated work	Result	Ref.
2002	Best Director	Moulin Rouge!	Nominated	

=== Producers Guild of America Awards ===
Year	Category	Nominated work	Result	Ref.
2002	Best Theatrical Motion Picture	Moulin Rouge!	Won	
2023	Outstanding Producer of Theatrical Motion Pictures	Elvis	Nominated	

=== Palm Springs International Film Festival ===
Year	Category	Nominated work	Result	Ref.
2002	Sonny Bono Visionary Award		Won	

=== Phoenix Film Critics Society Awards ===
Year	Category	Nominated work	Result	Ref.
2002	Best Director	Moulin Rouge!	Nominated	

=== Robert Awards ===
Year	Category	Nominated work	Result	Ref.
1993	Best Foreign Film	Strictly Ballroom	Won	
2002	Best Non-American Film	Moulin Rouge!	Won	

=== Satellite Awards ===
Year	Category	Nominated work	Result	Ref.
2002	Best Director	Moulin Rouge!	Won	
2002	Best Film - Musical or Comedy	Moulin Rouge!	Won	
2008	Best Original Song	Australia	Nominated	
2008	Best Screenplay – Original	Australia	Nominated	
2008	Auteur Award		Won	
2023	Best Film - Musical of Comedy	Elvis	Nominated	
2023	Best Director	Elvis	Nominated	

=== Teen Choice Awards ===
Year	Category	Nominated work	Result	Ref.
2002	Choice Movie – Drama	Moulin Rouge!	Nominated	
2009	Choice Movie – Romance	Australia	Nominated	

=== Toronto International Film Festival ===
Year	Category	Nominated work	Result	Ref.
1992	People's Choice Award	Strictly Ballroom	Won	

=== Vancouver Film Critics Circle ===
Year	Category	Nominated work	Result	Ref.
2001	Best Director	Moulin Rouge!	Won	

=== Vancouver International Film Festival ===
Year	Category	Nominated work	Result	Ref.
1992	Most Popular International Film	Strictly Ballroom	Won	

=== World Soundtrack Awards ===
Year	Category	Nominated work	Result	Ref.
2001	Most Creative Use of Existing Material on a Soundtrack	Moulin Rouge!	Won	

=== Writers Guild of America Awards ===
Year	Category	Nominated work	Result	Ref.
2002	Best Original Screenplay	Moulin Rouge!	Nominated	
