= Catherine Martin (designer) =

Australian designer and producer (born 1965)

Catherine Martin AC
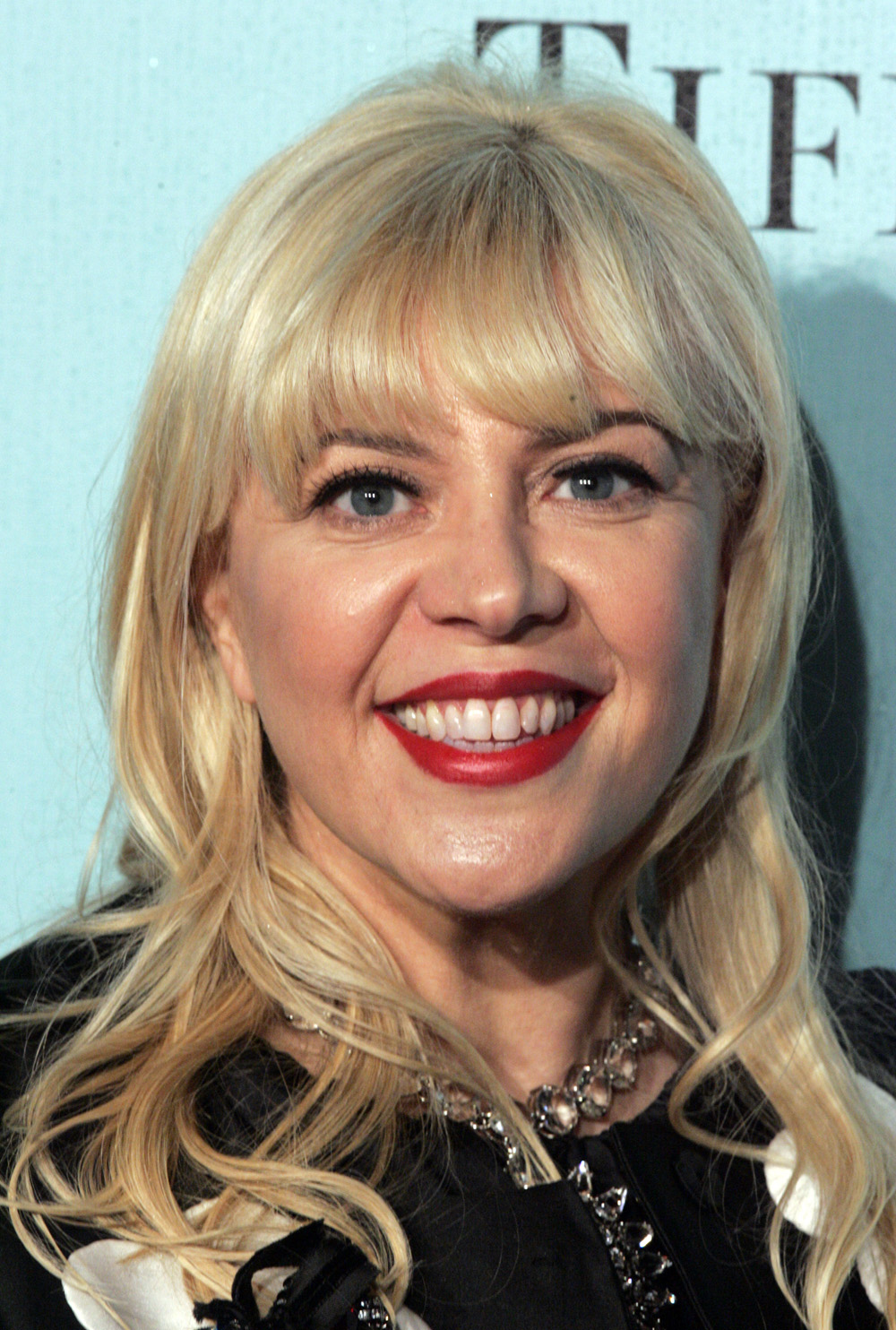
- Martin in 2013
- Born: 26 January 1965 (age 61); Lindfield, New South Wales, Australia
- Education: Sydney College of the Arts; East Sydney Technical College; National Institute of Dramatic Arts
- Occupations: Costume designer; production designer; set designer; film producer
- Years active: 1988–present
- Spouse: Baz Luhrmann (m. 1997)
- Children: 2
- Website: catherinemartin.com

Catherine Martin Luhrmann AC (born 26 January 1965) is an Australian costume designer, production designer, set designer, and film producer, best known for her frequent collaborations with director Baz Luhrmann. She has received numerous accolades, including four Academy Awards, six BAFTA Awards, and a Tony Award. Martin was appointed a Companion of the Order of Australia in 2025.

Martin came to international prominence for providing both the costumes and production design on Strictly Ballroom (1992), Luhrmann's feature directorial debut which later became the first installment of the "Red Curtain Trilogy". She won both the Academy Award for Best Costume Design and the Academy Award for Best Production Design for her work on Curtain's final chapter Moulin Rouge! (2001). Martin became just the second woman to win multiple Oscars in a single year (after Edith Head) and the first to accomplish this feat twice, winning the same two categories for The Great Gatsby (2013). She was also Oscar-nominated for Romeo + Juliet (1996), Australia (2008), and Elvis (2022). Having won four awards out of nine nominations, she holds the record for the most Oscar wins of any Australian.

== Early life and education ==
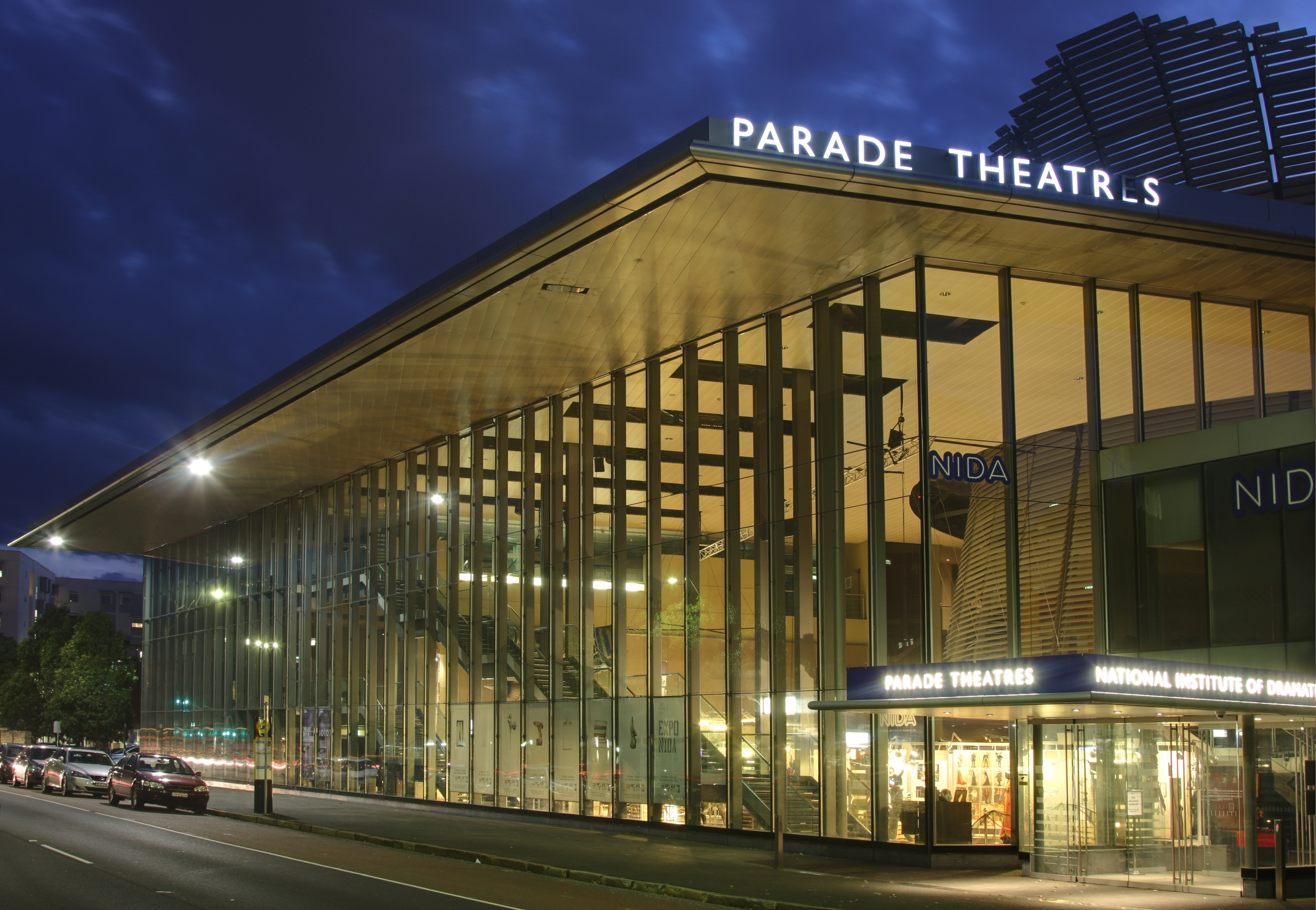
The National Institute of Dramatic Art in Kensington, New South Wales, where Martin studied

Martin was born on January 26, 1965, in Lindfield, New South Wales, to a French mother and an Australian father, both academics who met at the Sorbonne; her father was pursuing his expertise in 18th-century French literature, and her mother was studying mathematics at university. She and her brother grew up in Sydney but spent a lot of time with their grandparents in France's Loire Valley, visiting "every art gallery, every museum" along the way. Martin was fascinated from an early age by the vintage clothing parades occasionally thrown by her Australian grandmother and her church friends. She would beg her parents to take her to London's Victoria and Albert Museum so she could dig through the costume section, and recalled "being blown away by the costume gallery, being able to see a pleated lace ruff in reality" when she finally got there. Her mother taught her to use a sewing machine at age 6, and by age 15 she was creating her own patterns to make herself dresses. Martin cited The Wizard of Oz as her childhood inspiration and an extraordinary journey to take when she was 10, and then Gone with the Wind as the movie that, at age 13, changed her life from a fashion perspective.

Martin attended North Sydney Girls High School and, while a student, got a part-time job as an usherette at the Roseville theatre. She was first enrolled at Sydney College of the Arts and spent a year studying the visual arts before deciding to drop out for a career change. Then she studied pattern cutting at East Sydney Technical College. She was accepted into the National Institute of Dramatic Art (NIDA) and graduated in 1988 with a diploma in design. In her last year at university, she met and started collaborating with a fellow student, Baz Luhrmann, whom she later married. At that time, Luhrmann returned to NIDA looking for young designers with whom he planned to stage his one-act play, Strictly Ballroom, and Martin did some work on that production.

== Career ==
Martin's first professional engagement came after graduation when she began working on Luhrmann's environmental opera experiment, Lake Lost, staged at a television studio in Melbourne to celebrate the Australian Bicentenary in 1988. Their collaboration continued at Opera Australia when she provided set designs for Luhrmann's 1990 production of Giacomo Puccini's La bohème as well as the 1993 production of Benjamin Britten's A Midsummer Night's Dream.

Martin gained international acclaim when she entered the film industry, recreating her designs in Luhrmann's feature directorial debut, Strictly Ballroom (1992), the first part of the "Red Curtain Trilogy". It was a major financial success and received widespread acclaim from critics and audiences, who lauded the acting, direction, and production values. Among other accolades, the film cleaned up at the AFI Awards, picking up leading eight wins from 13 nominations and also winning three of its eight nominations at the BAFTAs, including both the Best Costume Design and the Best Production Design for Martin's visuals. She then received her first Oscar nomination for art direction in the trilogy's second installment, Romeo + Juliet (1996).

Their third feature film collaboration which concluded Curtain's Trilogy was Moulin Rouge! (2001). She earned both the Academy Award for Best Costume Design and the Academy Award for Best Production Design for her richly designed sets and dazzling costumes, which received widespread recognition from critics and audiences alike. She shared the former prize with Angus Strathie, the latter with Brigitte Broch (for the film's set decoration). Martin's double wins makes her just the second woman to win multiple Oscars in a single year, after fellow costume designer Edith Head.

For their next project together, the pair teamed up adaptating Luhrmann's earlier Australian production of La bohème for Broadway theatre, which opened to critical acclaim in December 2002. She won the Tony Award for Best Scenic Design and, alongside Strathie, was nominated for the Tony Award for Best Costume Design the following year.

Martin went to co-produce Luhrmann's epic Australia (2008) and was also the film's production and costume designer. It earned her another Oscar nomination. She has stated that the tailoring on the clothing produced for the film is one of her proudest achievements.

=== The Great Gatsby ===
Luhrmann and Martin started working on the cinematic reinvention of F. Scott Fitzgerald's classic, The Great Gatsby, a novel that she had not read since adolescence and had not much appreciated as a teenager. Nevertheless, Martin ended up being the book's biggest fan after her husband's insistence that she revisit it. Luhrmann thought about doing a new film version for about a decade, although he began writing a script only three years before actual filming started. For their ambitious purpose of trying to achieve an authentic feeling for the film but also something connective for a modern audience, the pair consulted academic texts about the novel as well as historical analyses pertaining to both Fitzgerald and his work. In particular, they went to libraries at the Metropolitan Museum of Art and the Fashion Institute of Technology to further their research on the project. Martin described herself during this time as being "like a detective".

Overall, Martin was charged with creating about 500 outfits for various cast members. She collaborated with Brooks Brothers and Miuccia Prada to design the costumes, as well as Tiffany & Co., which agreed to supply the film's jewelry. In particular, Prada created some twenty dresses for the film's first party scene as well as an additional twenty for the second one. Before filming started, Luhrmann said that since the book took place in 1922 and was published in 1925 but foreshadowed the economic crash of 1929, anything within that decade was appropriate to borrow for design purposes. This approach gives Martin more room to play with trends and flattering pieces, such as her choice to dress lead actor Leonardo DiCaprio in slimmer-cut suits, a decision that otherwise would not be typical for the time period in which the depicted events are taking place. Furthermore, she erred towards the decade's end for women's clothes, wanting to focus on slimmer silhouettes. She also took artistic liberties when it came to the actresses' footwear, telling Vogue that she found heels from the era to be "stumpy". Martin rationalized her anachronistic use of thinner-heeled shoes by telling herself she was copying what was found in fashion illustrations from the time.

Martin created a total of 42 lavish sets for the film, which all were constructed under her vision in a span of 14 weeks. Her inspiration came from the works of 1920s British designer Syrie Maugham as well as the iconic turn-of-the-century houses on Long Island, such as Beacon Towers for Gatsby's mansion and Old Westbury Gardens for the Buchanans' estate. She also gave credit to the 1920s silent film designs, particularly those of Sunrise (1927) and Speedy (1928), for inspiring Gatsby's high-gloss Art Deco visual style.

Martin once again received universal acclaim for creating film's visuals, winning her two more Oscars for both Best Costume Design and Best Production Design, the latter of which she shares with Beverley Dunn. Having won her fourth career Academy Award, she claimed the record for the most Oscar wins of any Australian, overtaking fellow costume designer Orry-Kelly, who won three in the 1950s.

Shortly after the release of Gatsby, Martin collaborated with Brooks Brothers to release a limited edition menswear collection. She has also launched a range of home wares, featuring paints, wallpaper and rugs.

== Other ventures ==
In 1997, Martin and Luhrmann founded a production company Bazmark to manage their various creative projects.

Martin was named a Glamour Magazine Woman of the Year in 2013. Discussing her and Luhrmann's progression as artists, Marin told the magazine, "We've gone from me staying up all night to paint the floor to where I am now, with 300 carpenters working for me. I feel like the Queen of England". For her spread in their December issue, her husband photographed her alongside their children.

Martin's work was featured in fellow costume designer Deborah Nadoolman Landis' 2013 book Hollywood Costume.

Martin has stated that she prides herself on ensuring the costumes she produces are beautifully made, comfortable, and easy to take on and off. She also said that she is no longer tempted to keep any wardrobe mementos from the films she works on, telling Fashionista, "... I realised through long and hard experience the best record of your work, is the work itself."

In 2016, Martin and Luhrmann developed the Netflix television series The Get Down, which takes place in 1970s South Bronx. She served as an executive producer of the series.

In 2025 the couple has designed the private carriage Celia for the Belmond British Pullman luxury train, rebuilt from a former Brighton Belle motorcar, which has entered service in April 2026. The vehicle features a capacity of 12 passengers, a bar, a dining and a lounge area.

== Personal life ==
Martin met her husband, Baz Luhrmann, at university, and the pair married on Australia Day 1997, her 32nd birthday. The couple has two children together. In July 2015, the couple placed their Darlinghurst mansion on the market for A$16 million, in favour of establishing a more settled family life in New York City, where their family has been spending more and more time.

== Filmography ==
=== Feature films ===
List of Catherine Martin feature film credits
Year	Title	Director	Credited as			Notes
Year	Title	Director	Costume Designer	Production Designer	Producer	Notes
1989	Out of the Body	Brian Trenchard-Smith	Yes	No	No	
1992	Strictly Ballroom	Baz Luhrmann	Yes	Yes	No	Co-designed costumes with Angus Strathie; Martin designed street costumes, whereas Strathie designed ballroom attire Also titles design
1996	Romeo + Juliet	Baz Luhrmann	No	Yes	Associate	Also title designer
2001	Moulin Rouge!	Baz Luhrmann	Yes	Yes	Associate	Co-designed costumes with Angus Strathie
2008	Australia	Baz Luhrmann	Yes	Yes	Co-producer	
2013	The Great Gatsby	Baz Luhrmann	Yes	Yes	Yes	Co-designed sets with Karen Murphy as associate production designer
2022	Elvis	Baz Luhrmann	Yes	Yes	Yes	Co-designed sets with Karen Murphy; Also titles concept design
2025	EPiC: Elvis Presley in Concert	Baz Luhrmann	No	No	Executive	Documentary

=== Short films ===
List of Catherine Martin short film credits
Year	Title	Director	Credited as			Notes
Year	Title	Director	Costume Designer	Production Designer	Producer	Notes
2004	No. 5 the Film	Baz Luhrmann	No	Yes	No	Commissioned by Chanel
2012	Waist Up/Waist Down	Baz Luhrmann	Yes	Yes	No	Created for the 2012 Met Gala and accompanying exhibition at the Metropolitan Museum of Art
2012	Ugly Chic	Baz Luhrmann	Yes	No	No	Created for the 2012 Met Gala and accompanying exhibition at the Metropolitan Museum of Art
2012	The Surreal Body	Baz Luhrmann	Yes	No	No	Created for the 2012 Met Gala and accompanying exhibition at the Metropolitan Museum of Art
2012	The Exotic Body	Baz Luhrmann	Yes	Yes	No	Created for the 2012 Met Gala and accompanying exhibition at the Metropolitan Museum of Art
2012	The Classical Body	Baz Luhrmann	Yes	Yes	No	Created for the 2012 Met Gala and accompanying exhibition at the Metropolitan Museum of Art
2012	Schiaparelli & Prada: Impossible Conversations	Baz Luhrmann	Yes	Yes	No	Created for the 2012 Met Gala and accompanying exhibition at the Metropolitan Museum of Art
2012	Naif Chic	Baz Luhrmann	Yes	Yes	No	Created for the 2012 Met Gala and accompanying exhibition at the Metropolitan Museum of Art
2012	Hard Chic	Baz Luhrmann	Yes	Yes	No	Created for the 2012 Met Gala and accompanying exhibition at the Metropolitan Museum of Art
2014	Channel No. 5: The One That I Want	Baz Luhrmann	No	Yes	No	Commissioned by Chanel
2017	ERDEM x H&M: The Secret Life of Flowers	Baz Luhrmann	No	Yes	Yes	
2021	A Style for Every Story	Sam Martin	No	No	Executive	Documentary short film
2025	Grande Envie	Herself	No	No	No	Also story writer Commissioned by Miu Miu

=== Television ===
List of Catherine Martin television credits
Year	Title	Contribution			Notes
Year	Title	Costume Designer	Production Designer	Executive Producer	Notes
1994	Great Performances	Yes	Yes	No	Designed sets and co-designed costumes for the episode "La boheme" Co-designed costumes with Angus Strathie
2016–2017	The Get Down	Yes	Yes	Yes	Co-designed costumes and sets for the episode "Where There Is Ruin, There Is Hope for a Treasure"; Co-designed costumes with Jeriana San Juan and sets with Karen Murphy
2023	Faraway Downs	Yes	Yes	Yes	Alternate and extended cut of Australia

== Awards and nominations ==
Major associations

Academy Awards

Year	Category	Nominated work	Result	Ref.
1997	Best Art Direction	Romeo + Juliet	Nominated	
2002	Best Art Direction	Moulin Rouge!	Won	
2002	Best Costume Design	Moulin Rouge!	Won	
2009	Best Costume Design	Australia	Nominated	
2014	Best Costume Design	The Great Gatsby	Won	
2014	Best Production Design	The Great Gatsby	Won	
2023	Best Picture	Elvis	Nominated	
2023	Best Costume Design	Elvis	Nominated	
2023	Best Production Design	Elvis	Nominated	

BAFTA Awards

Year	Category	Nominated work	Result	Ref.
British Academy Film Awards
1993	Best Costume Design	Strictly Ballroom	Won	
1993	Best Production Design	Strictly Ballroom	Won	
1998	Best Production Design	Romeo + Juliet	Won	
2002	Best Costume Design	Moulin Rouge!	Nominated	
2002	Best Production Design	Moulin Rouge!	Nominated	
2014	Best Costume Design	The Great Gatsby	Won	
2014	Best Production Design	The Great Gatsby	Won	
2023	Best Film	Elvis	Nominated	
2023	Best Costume Design	Elvis	Won	
2023	Best Production Design	Elvis	Nominated	

Tony Awards

Year	Category	Nominated work	Result	Ref.
2003	Best Costume Design	La bohème	Nominated	
2003	Best Scenic Design	La bohème	Won	

Miscellaneous awards

List of Catherine Martin other awards and nominations
Award	Year (Note: Indicates the year of ceremony. Each year is linked to the article about the awards held that year, wherever possible.)	Category	Title	Result	Ref.
AACTA Awards	1992	Best Production Design	Strictly Ballroom	Won	
AACTA Awards	1999	Byron Kennedy Award	—N/a	Honoured	
AACTA Awards	2001	Best Costume Design	Moulin Rouge!	Won	
AACTA Awards	2001	Best Production Design	Moulin Rouge!	Won	
AACTA Awards	2009	Best Costume Design	Australia	Won	
AACTA Awards	2009	Best Production Design	Australia	Won	
AACTA Awards	2014	Best Film	The Great Gatsby	Won	
AACTA Awards	2014	Best Costume Design	The Great Gatsby	Won	
AACTA Awards	2014	Best Production Design	The Great Gatsby	Won	
AACTA Awards	2022	Best Film	Elvis	Won	
AACTA Awards	2022	Best Costume Design	Elvis	Won	
AACTA Awards	2022	Best Production Design	Elvis	Won	
AACTA Awards	2022	Longford Lyell Award	—N/a	Honoured	
ADG Excellence in Production Design Awards	2002	Excellence in Production Design for a Period or Fantasy Film	Moulin Rouge!	Won	
ADG Excellence in Production Design Awards	2014	Excellence in Production Design for a Period Film	The Great Gatsby	Won	
ADG Excellence in Production Design Awards	2023	Excellence in Production Design for a Period Film	Elvis	Nominated	
ADG Excellence in Production Design Awards	2023	Cinematic Imagery Award	—N/a	Honoured	
APDG Awards	2013	Award for Title Design	The Great Gatsby	Nominated	
APDG Awards	2013	Award for Visual Effects Design	The Great Gatsby	Won	
APDG Awards	2013	Award for Costume Design for Screen	The Great Gatsby	Won	
APDG Awards	2013	Award for Design on a Feature Film	The Great Gatsby	Won (Note: Tied with Melinda Doring, Janie Parker and Glen W. Johnson for The Sapphires)	
APDG Awards	2021	Cameron Creswell Outstanding Contribution to Design Award	—N/a	Honoured	
APDG Awards	2023	Award for Set Decoration for a Feature Film or Television Production	Elvis	Nominated	
APDG Awards	2023	Award for Design on a Feature Film	Elvis	Won	
Astra Film and Creative Arts Awards	2023	Best Costume Design	Elvis	Nominated	
Astra Film and Creative Arts Awards	2023	Best Production Design	Elvis	Nominated	
Capri Hollywood International Film Festival	2023	Best Costume Design	Elvis	Won	
Capri Hollywood International Film Festival	2023	Best Production Design	Elvis	Won	
Capri Hollywood International Film Festival	2023	Capri Producers of the Year	Elvis	Won	
Chicago Film Critics Association Awards	2013	Best Art Direction/Production Design	The Great Gatsby	Nominated	
Costume Designers Guild Awards	2014	Excellence in Period Film	The Great Gatsby	Nominated	
Costume Designers Guild Awards	2023	Excellence in Period Film	Elvis	Won	
Critics' Choice Awards	2014	Best Costume Design	The Great Gatsby	Won	
Critics' Choice Awards	2014	Best Production Design	The Great Gatsby	Won	
Critics' Choice Awards	2023	Best Costume Design	Elvis	Nominated	
Critics' Choice Awards	2023	Best Production Design	Elvis	Nominated	
Drama Desk Awards	2003	Outstanding Costume Design	La bohème	Nominated	
Drama Desk Awards	2003	Outstanding Scenic Design of a Musical	La bohème	Won	
Film Critics Circle of Australia Awards	2014	Best Film	The Great Gatsby	Nominated	
Film Critics Circle of Australia Awards	2014	Best Production Design	The Great Gatsby	Won	
Film Critics Circle of Australia Awards	2023	Best Film	Elvis	Nominated	
Florida Film Critics Circle Awards	2013	Best Art Direction/Production Design	The Great Gatsby	Won	
Florida Film Critics Circle Awards	2022	Best Art Direction/Production Design	Elvis	Nominated	
Georgia Film Critics Association Awards	2023	Best Production Design	Elvis	Nominated	
Gold Coast Film Festival	2023	Chauvel Award	—N/a	Honoured	
Green Room Awards	1995	Best Design in Opera	A Midsummer Night's Dream	Won	
Helpmann Awards	2014	Best Costume Design	Strictly Ballroom The Musical	Nominated	
Hollywood Music in Media Awards	2022	Best Music Themed Film, Biopic, or Musical	Elvis	Nominated	
Inside Film Awards	2009	Best Production Design	Australia	Nominated	
International Cinephile Society Awards	2009	Best Production Design	Australia	Nominated	
International Cinephile Society Awards	2014	Best Production Design	The Great Gatsby	Nominated	
Las Vegas Film Critics Society Awards	2002	Best Costume Design	Moulin Rouge!	Nominated	
Las Vegas Film Critics Society Awards	2022	Best Art Direction	Elvis	Nominated	
Las Vegas Film Critics Society Awards	2022	Best Costume Design	Elvis	Won	
London Film Critics' Circle Awards	2023	Technical Achievement Award	Elvis	Nominated	
Los Angeles Film Critics Association Awards	2001	Best Production Design	Moulin Rouge!	Won	
Online Film Critics Society Awards	2023	Best Costume Design	Elvis	Nominated	
Online Film Critics Society Awards	2023	Best Production Design	Elvis	Nominated	
Outer Critics Circle Awards	2003	Outstanding Costume Design	La bohème	Nominated	
Outer Critics Circle Awards	2003	Outstanding Set Design	La bohème	Won	
Ovation Awards	2004	Costume Design (Large Theater)	La bohème	Nominated	
Ovation Awards	2004	Set Design (Large Theater)	La bohème	Won	
Phoenix Film Critics Society Awards	2002	Best Costume Design	Moulin Rouge!	Nominated	
Phoenix Film Critics Society Awards	2002	Best Production Design	Moulin Rouge!	Nominated	
Phoenix Film Critics Society Awards	2013	Best Costume Design	The Great Gatsby	Won	
Phoenix Film Critics Society Awards	2013	Best Production Design	The Great Gatsby	Nominated	
Producers Guild of America Awards	2023	Best Theatrical Motion Picture	Elvis	Nominated	
Rodeo Drive Walk of Style	2014	Rodeo Drive Walk of Style Award	—N/a	Honoured	
San Diego Film Critics Society Awards	2001	Best Production Design	Moulin Rouge!	Won	
San Diego Film Critics Society Awards	2013	Best Production Design	The Great Gatsby	Won	
San Diego Film Critics Society Awards	2023	Best Costume Design	Elvis	Won	
Santa Barbara International Film Festival	2023	Variety Artisans Award	Elvis	Won	
Satellite Awards	1997	Best Art Direction & Production Design	Romeo + Juliet	Won	
Satellite Awards	2002	Best Art Direction & Production Design	Moulin Rouge!	Won	
Satellite Awards	2002	Best Costume Design	Moulin Rouge!	Won	
Satellite Awards	2008	Best Art Direction & Production Design	Australia	Won	
Satellite Awards	2008	Best Costume Design	Australia	Nominated	
Satellite Awards	2014	Best Art Direction & Production Design	The Great Gatsby	Won	
Satellite Awards	2014	Best Costume Design	The Great Gatsby	Nominated	
Satellite Awards	2023	Best Art Direction & Production Design	Elvis	Nominated	
Satellite Awards	2023	Best Costume Design	Elvis	Nominated	
Saturn Awards	2002	Best Costume Design	Moulin Rouge!	Nominated	
Saturn Awards	2009	Best Costume Design	Australia	Nominated	
Seattle Film Critics Society Awards (Note: prior to the SFCS formal establishment in 2016, a group of Seattle-area critics compiled the Seattle Film Critics Awards in 2014 and 2015.)	2014	Best Costume Design	The Great Gatsby	Won	
Seattle Film Critics Society Awards	2014	Best Production Design	The Great Gatsby	Nominated	
Seattle Film Critics Society Awards	2023	Best Costume Design	Elvis	Won	
Seattle Film Critics Society Awards	2023	Best Production Design	Elvis	Nominated	
Set Decorators Society of America Awards	2023	Best Achievement in Decor/Design of a Period Feature Film	Elvis	Won	
St. Louis Film Critics Association Awards	2022	Best Costume Design	Elvis	Won	
St. Louis Film Critics Association Awards	2022	Best Production Design	Elvis	Won	
Washington D.C. Area Film Critics Association Awards	2013	Best Art Direction	The Great Gatsby	Won	
Washington D.C. Area Film Critics Association Awards	2022	Best Art Direction	Elvis	Nominated	
WhatsOnStage Awards	2019	Best Costume Design	Strictly Ballroom	Nominated	

Honorary degrees

Name of school, year given, and name of degree
School	Year	Degree	Ref.
University of Sydney	2025	Doctor of Letters (honoris causa)	

== Other honours ==
- Martin was awarded the Centenary Medal in 2001 for service to Australian society and Australian film production.
- Martin was appointed a Companion of the Order of Australia in the 2025 King's Birthday Honours for "eminent service to the arts, to costume, production and set design, and to fostering emerging artistic talent."
