= Red Curtain Trilogy =

Three films directed by Baz Luhrmann

- Directed by: Baz Luhrmann
- Written by: Baz Luhrmann; Craig Pearce
- Produced by: Strictly Ballroom (SB): Tristram Mall; Antoinette Albert; Romeo + Juliet (R+J): Baz Luhrmann; Gabriella Martinelli; Martin Brown; Moulin Rouge (MR): Baz Luhrmann; Fred Baron; Martin Brown
- Starring: Paul Mercurio (SB); Tara Morice (SB); Leonardo DiCaprio (R+J); Claire Danes (R+J); Ewan McGregor (MR); Nicole Kidman (MR)
- Cinematography: Steve Mason (SB); Donald McAlpine (R+J, MR)
- Edited by: Jill Bilcock
- Music by: David Hirschfelder (SB); Nellee Hooper (R+J); Craig Armstrong (MR)
- Production companies: AFFC (SB); M&A Productions (SB); Bazmark (R+J, MR)
- Distributed by: Miramax Films (SB); 20th Century Fox (R+J, MR)
- Running time: 441 minutes
- Countries: Australia; United States
- Language: English
- Budget: $70 million
- Box office: $338,506,454

The Red Curtain Trilogy is a DVD boxed set, released in 2002, of the first three films directed by Baz Luhrmann, Strictly Ballroom (1992), Romeo + Juliet (1996), and Moulin Rouge! (2001).

The films do not form a trilogy in the traditional sense, as there is no relationship between the plot and characters of the three films. Rather, Luhrmann said that the three films followed a specific style of filmmaking. Each film contains a theatre motif that reappears throughout the film. Dance is used in the first film, poetry and language in the second, and song in the third.

== Reception ==
=== Box office performance ===
Film	Australian release date	Box office gross			Budget	Ref(s)
Film	Australian release date	Australia	Other territories	Worldwide	Budget	Ref(s)
Strictly Ballroom	20 August 1992	$11,738,022	—N/a	$11,738,022	$3 million	
Romeo + Juliet	26 December 1996	$46,351,345	$101,203,653	$147,554,998	$14.5 million	
Moulin Rouge!	24 May 2001	$57,386,607	$121,826,827	$179,213,434	$52.5 million	

=== Critical response ===
Film	Rotten Tomatoes	Metacritic	CinemaScore
Strictly Ballroom	95% (41 reviews)	72 (16 reviews)	—N/a
Romeo + Juliet	72% (64 reviews)	60 (20 reviews)	A-
Moulin Rouge!	76% (198 reviews)	66 (35 reviews)	B+

== Academy Award wins and nominations ==
Film	Ceremony	Category	Recipient	Result	Ref.
William Shakespeare's Romeo + Juliet	69th Academy Awards	Best Art Direction	Art Direction: Catherine Martin; Set Decoration: Brigitte Broch	Nominated	
Moulin Rouge!	74th Academy Awards	Best Picture	Martin Brown, Fred Baron, Baz Luhrmann	Nominated	
Moulin Rouge!	74th Academy Awards	Best Actress	Nicole Kidman	Nominated	
Moulin Rouge!	74th Academy Awards	Best Art Direction	Art Direction: Catherine Martin; Set Decoration: Brigitte Broch	Won	
Moulin Rouge!	74th Academy Awards	Best Cinematography	Donald McAlpine	Nominated	
Moulin Rouge!	74th Academy Awards	Best Costume Design	Catherine Martin, Angus Strathie	Won	
Moulin Rouge!	74th Academy Awards	Best Film Editing	Jill Bilcock	Nominated	
Moulin Rouge!	74th Academy Awards	Best Makeup	Maurizio Silvi, Aldo Signoretti	Nominated	
Moulin Rouge!	74th Academy Awards	Best Sound	Andy Nelson, Anna Behlmer, Roger Savage, Guntis Sics	Nominated	
