= No. 5 the Film =

2004 short film

- Directed by: Baz Luhrmann
- Produced by: Baz Luhrmann
- Starring: Nicole Kidman; Rodrigo Santoro
- Cinematography: Mandy Walker
- Edited by: Daniel Schwarze
- Music by: Claude Debussy (arranged by Craig Armstrong)
- Production companies: Chanel; Bazmark
- Distributed by: Chanel
- Release date: 20 November 2004 (UK)
- Running time: 180 secs
- Country: United States
- Language: English
- Budget: US$33 million

No. 5 the Film is a 2004 180-second short film directed by Baz Luhrmann and starring Nicole Kidman and Rodrigo Santoro. Karl Lagerfeld designed the costumes; he also briefly appears in the film. It is part of a new breed of advertising crossover films known as branded content. It had a budget of US$33 million, financed exclusively by Chanel. The film is an extended television commercial for Chanel No. 5 perfume. The film was initially screened in many North American cinemas during the "Coming Attractions" section preceding the main feature. During the 2006 Christmas season, an edited 30-second TV spot was shown on primetime on many networks in Canada and the United States. Kidman was paid $3 million for her role in the advertisement.

== Plot ==
A famous celebrity (Nicole Kidman) runs away in a pink dress in the middle of Times Square in New York City, only to get into a cab with the one man who does not know who she is, a plot line similar to Roman Holiday. After four days in his Lower East Side apartment, her secretary (Lagerfeld) commands her to return to her life as a celebrity. The paparazzi take pictures of her as she walks upstairs and looks at big letters, a graphical device often used in Luhrmann's Red Curtain Trilogy, on top of a building that read "Coco Chanel" with her lover standing next to them. They smile at each other and then the credits are shown.

== Music ==
The main musical theme of the film is Claude Debussy's "Clair de lune", arranged by Craig Armstrong and performed by the Sydney Symphony Orchestra.

== Runtime ==
The original version after preliminary editing came to around 360 seconds, but this was later edited to a more manageable 180 seconds, including 60 seconds of credits, for television broadcasts and cinema advertisements. Further cutting has led to subsequent 90-second (as seen in the UK) and 30-second (seen mostly in the U.S. and Canada) versions of the advert, shown after the first runs of the advert.

== Sequel ==
In 2014 Baz Luhrmann created a sequel film titled Chanel No. 5: The One That I Want. The film stars model Gisele Bündchen and actor Michiel Huisman.
