= Angus Strathie =

Australian costume designer

Angus Strathie is an Australian costume designer.

== Biography ==
A friend and longtime colleague of Baz Luhrmann and Catherine Martin, one of his earliest projects was Strictly Ballroom, a romantic comedy produced in 1992. Strathie went on to design the costumes for a TV production of the Puccini opera La Boheme before doing the costumes for Moulin Rouge!.

The catsuit in the 2004 Catwoman was designed by Angus, Halle Berry, director Pitof, and the producers. He designed vintage costumes for the 2015 American romantic fantasy film The Age of Adaline. His work for the American supernatural horror streaming television series Chilling Adventures of Sabrina was described as an "anachronistic bricolage". He designed cabaret costumes for the second season of the American musical comedy television series Schmigadoon!.

== Awards ==
- 2001: Oscar for Best Costume Design
