= San Diego Film Critics Society Awards 2001 =

Annual US film awards ceremony

6th SDFCS Awards

December 18, 2001

Best Film:
Ghost World

The 6th San Diego Film Critics Society Awards, given by the San Diego Film Critics Society on 18 December 2001, honored the best in film for 2001.

== Winners ==
- Best Actor:
  - Guy Pearce – Memento
- Best Actress:
  - Thora Birch – Ghost World
- Best Cinematography:
  - The Man Who Wasn't There – Roger Deakins
- Best Director:
  - Terry Zwigoff – Ghost World
- Best Film:
  - Ghost World
- Best Foreign Language Film:
  - Amélie (Le fabuleux destin d'Amélie Poulain) • France
- Best Production Design:
  - Moulin Rouge! – Catherine Martin
- Best Screenplay – Adapted:
  - Ghost World – Daniel Clowes and Terry Zwigoff
- Best Screenplay – Original:
  - Donnie Darko – Richard Kelly
- Best Supporting Actor:
  - Ben Kingsley – Sexy Beast
- Best Supporting Actress:
  - Naomi Watts – Mulholland Drive
- Body of Work Award:
  - Steve Buscemi
