= Strictly Ballroom =

1992 film by Baz Luhrmann

- Australian theatrical release poster
- Directed by: Baz Luhrmann
- Screenplay by: Baz Luhrmann; Craig Pearce
- Based on: Screenplay by: Baz Luhrmann; Andrew Bovell
- Produced by: Tristram Miall
- Starring: Paul Mercurio; Tara Morice; Bill Hunter; Pat Thomson; Gia Carides; Peter Whitford; Barry Otto
- Cinematography: Steve Mason
- Edited by: Jill Bilcock
- Music by: David Hirschfelder
- Production companies: M&A Productions
- Distributed by: Ronin Films
- Release dates: 20 August 1992 (Australia); 12 February 1993 (United States)
- Running time: 94 minutes
- Country: Australia
- Language: English
- Budget: AUD 3 million
- Box office: AUD 80 million

Strictly Ballroom is a 1992 Australian romantic comedy film directed by Baz Luhrmann, who co-wrote the screenplay with Craig Pearce. The film is the first in his Red Curtain Trilogy of theatre-motif-related films; it was followed by Romeo + Juliet (1996) and Moulin Rouge! (2001).

Strictly Ballroom began as a stage play, originally set up in 1984 by Luhrmann and fellow students during his studies at the National Institute of Dramatic Arts in Sydney. An expanded version of the play became a success at the Czechoslovak Youth Drama Festival in Bratislava in 1986. In 1988, it had a successful season at Sydney's Wharf Theatre, where it was seen by Australian music executive Ted Albert and his wife Antoinette. They both loved it, and when Albert, soon after, set up the film production company M&A Productions with ex-Film Australia producer Tristram Miall, they offered Luhrmann their plan to transform his play into a film. He agreed on the condition that he would also get to direct it.

== Plot ==
Scott Hastings, the frustrated son of a family of ballroom dancers, has been training since the age of six. His mother Shirley teaches ballroom dancing, and his father Doug meekly handles maintenance chores at the dance studio, while secretly watching old footage of his bygone dance competitions as well as Scott's in a back room. Scott struggles to establish his personal style of dance to win the Pan-Pacific Grand Prix Dancing Championship, but his innovative and flashy 'crowd-pleasing' steps are not considered 'strictly ballroom', and as such are denounced by Australian Dancing Federation head Barry Fife.

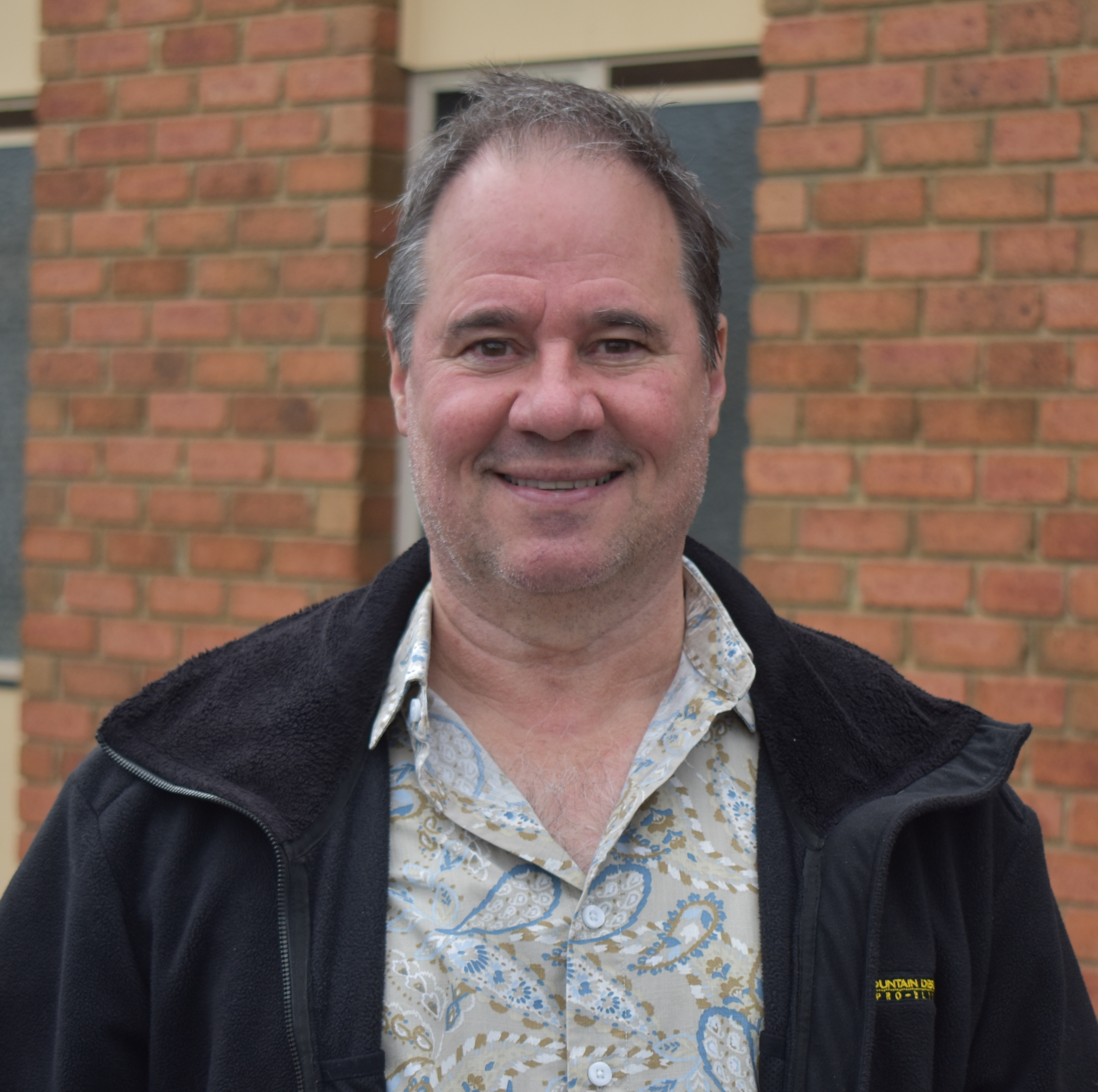
Paul Mercurio plays Scott Hastings, the frustrated son of a family of ballroom dancers, whose flashy 'crowd-pleasing' steps are not considered 'strictly ballroom'.

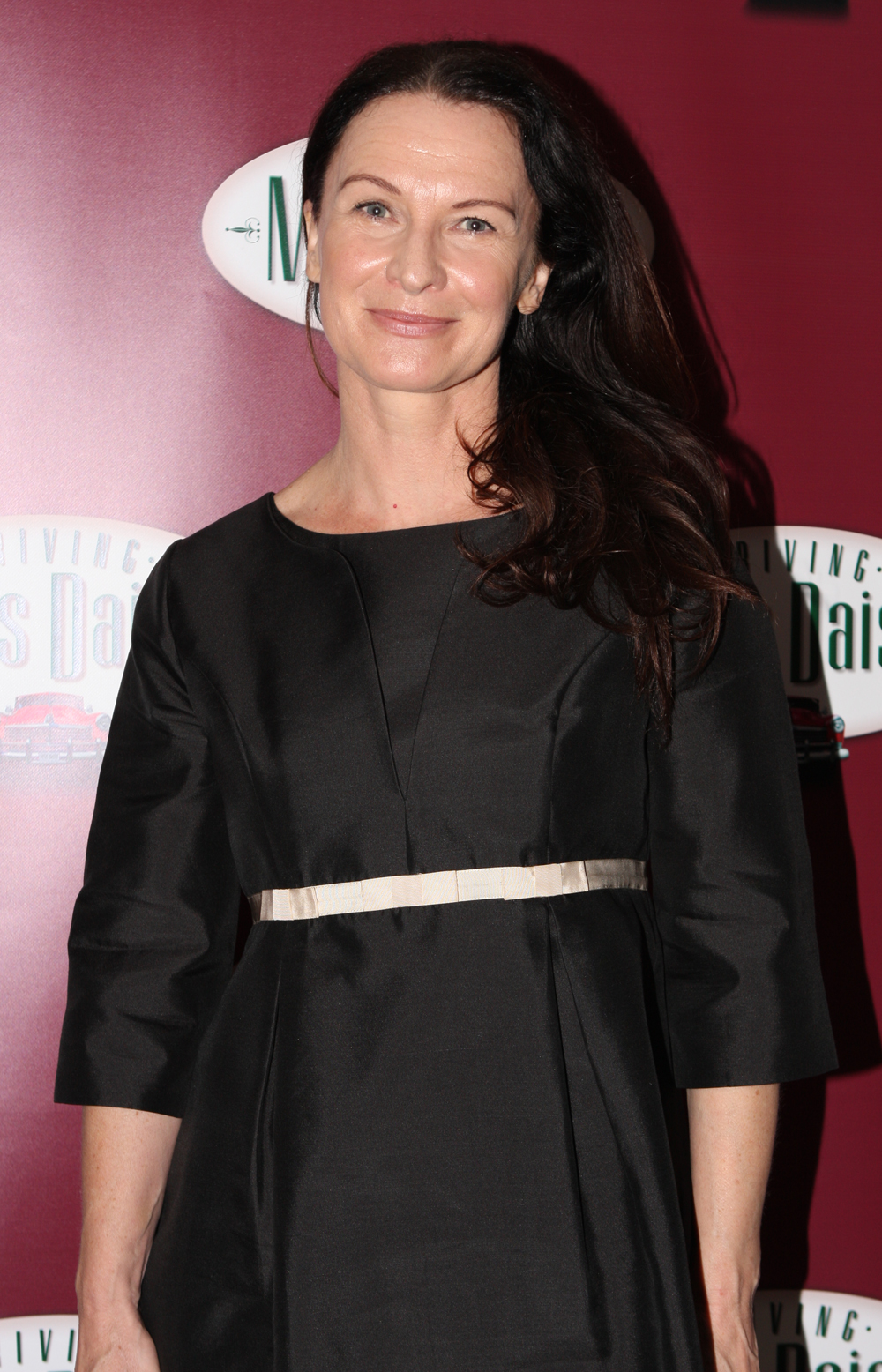
Tara Morice plays Fran, a 'beginner' dancer at the studio with whom Scott eventually agrees to partner, intrigued by her willingness to dance "his way".

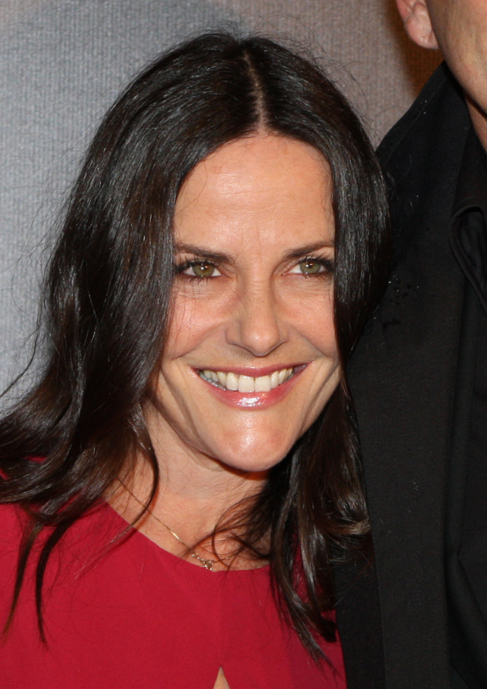
Gia Carides plays Liz Holt, Scott’s dancing partner, who leaves him when they lose a championship because Scott refuses to stick to approved dancing steps.

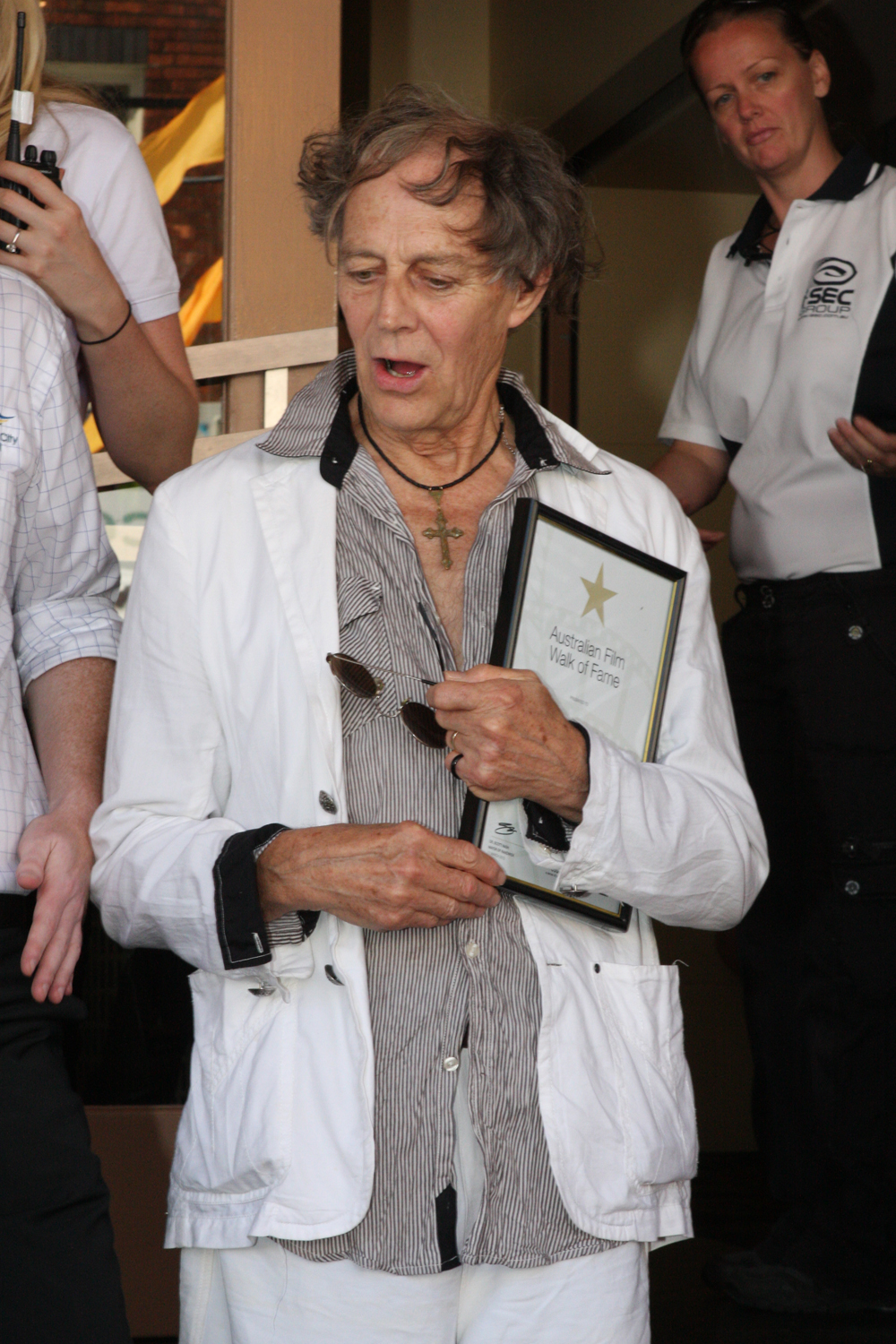
Barry Otto plays Doug Hastings, Scott’s father, who meekly stepped aside as Shirley’s dance partner when dancing his own steps lost them the championship.

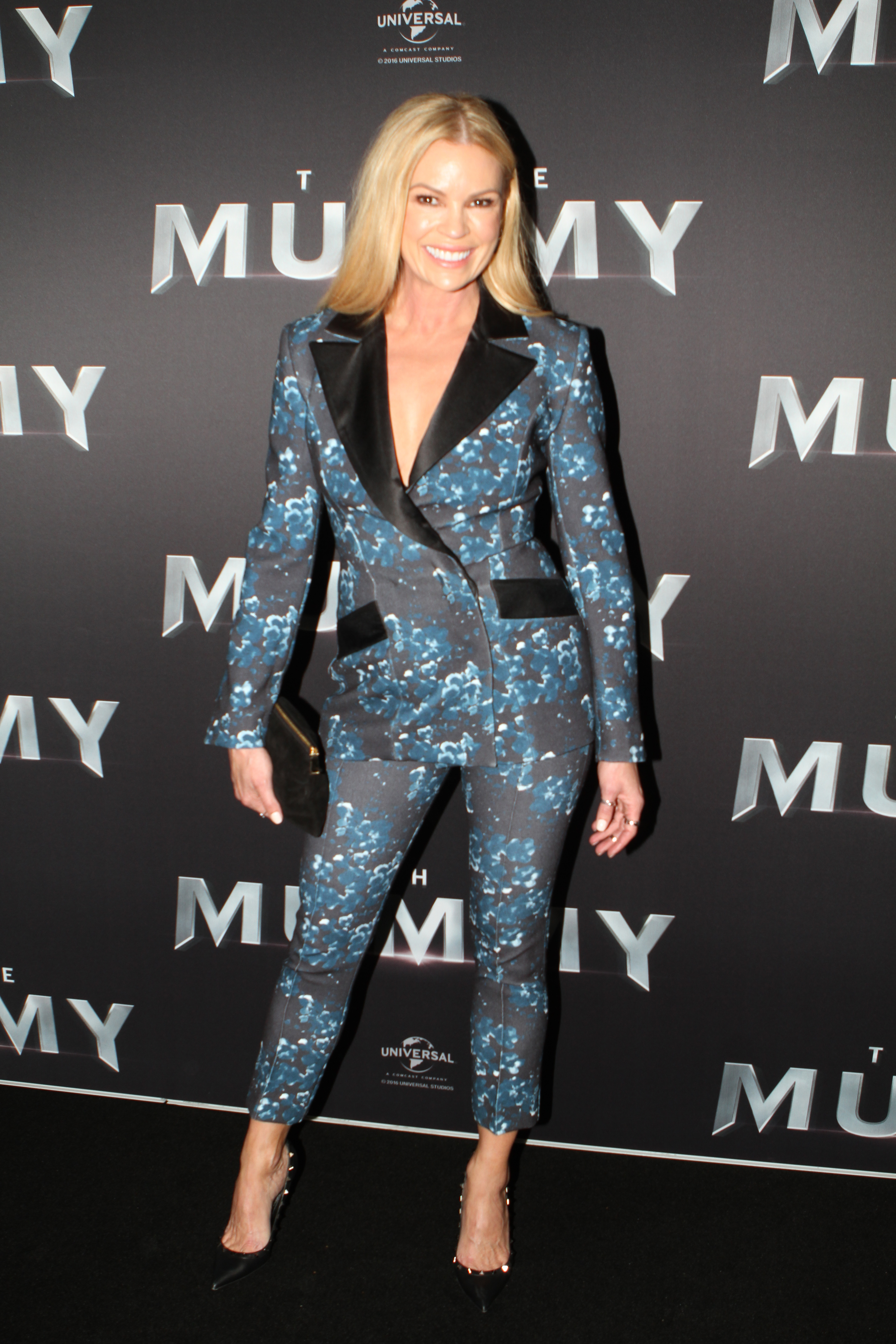
Sonia Kruger plays Tina Sparkle, champion dancer who Shirley Hastings and Les Kendall want to replace Fran as Scott’s partner at the Pan-Pacific Grand Prix Dancing Championship.

Scott and his dancing partner Liz Holt lose the Southern Districts Waratah Championships due to Scott dancing his own steps. Three days later, Liz leaves him to team up with Ken Railings, the recent Waratah Championships winner; his partner Pam Short has broken both her legs in a car accident. With Scott now alone only three weeks until the championships, Shirley teams up with his coach Les Kendall, her co-instructor at the studio, to start desperately hunting for a new partner for him. Meanwhile, unbeknownst to both, Scott is approached by Fran, an overlooked 'beginner' dancer at the studio. He eventually agrees to partner with her, intrigued by her willingness to dance "his way".

The pairing faces its first hurdle when Fife, attempting to prevent Scott from threatening the Dancesport status quo, arranges for his partnership with established Champion dancer Tina Sparkle. When Shirley and Les hear the news, they are overjoyed. Fran, happening upon them exclaiming over their happiness about Scott's new dance partner, misunderstands initially and believes they have discovered that she and Scott have become partners. When she realises the truth, she leaves, devastated. Scott pursues her and, although she is hurt, entices her to dance backstage with him, and her anger is forgotten. However, several onlookers witness their dance, including Shirley and Les, who then do everything possible to persuade both Scott and Fran that the best way forward for all concerned is for Scott to forget about Fran and sign on as Tina Sparkle's partner.

Fran, accused of damaging Scott's chances, reluctantly accedes and returns home crestfallen. Scott tells his mother he won't dance with Tina. He follows Fran home, where her overprotective Spanish father, Rico, discovers and challenges him. To appease Rico, Scott proposes a Paso Doble for the assembled company. Rico and Fran's grandmother Ya Ya demonstrate the proper Paso Doble technique and offer to teach the couple, who spend the next week training with Fran's family.

However, Fife intervenes, telling Scott that his father Doug, ruined his own career by dancing his own steps, which he has regretted ever since. Unwilling to upset his father and convinced to win the championship for him, Scott finally decides to remain "strictly ballroom", returning to Liz after Ken leaves her to dance with Tina Sparkle himself. During the competition, Doug explains to Scott that Fife lied: Fife had convinced Shirley to dance with Les instead of Doug so that Fife could win the competition. Scott runs after Fran and persuades her to dance with him, while his friend Wayne Burns and Wayne's partner Vanessa Cronin overhear Fife plotting to sabotage Scott in favour of audience favorite Ken.

In the next round, Scott and Fran make a dramatic entrance and begin dancing, immediately riveting the audience. Fife tries to disqualify them, but Wayne Burns disconnects the PA system, allowing Scott and Fran to dance a Paso Doble routine that impresses the audience. Desperate, Fife tries to turn off the music, but Les, having been alerted to Fife's treachery by Wayne, slows him down, allowing Scott's younger sister Kylie and her partner Luke to lock the sound booth. Fife only manages to disqualify Scott and Fran unopposed after his girlfriend Charm Leachman disconnects the sound system, but Doug begins clapping out a beat to enable the pair to continue dancing. The audience claps along, as Scott and Fran resume dancing; Liz, having had a change of heart, turns on Fife and Leachman and restores the music, and Scott and Fran's spirited dancing brings down the house. Doug asks Shirley to dance with him and the whole audience joins them on the floor. As the performance finishes, Scott and Fran kiss.

== Cast ==
- Paul Mercurio as Scott Hastings
- Tara Morice as Fran (Francisca)
- Bill Hunter as Barry Fife
- Pat Thomson as Shirley Hastings, Scott’s mother
- Gia Carides as Liz Holt
- Peter Whitford as Les Kendall, Scott’s coach
- Barry Otto as Doug Hastings, Scott’s father and Shirley's husband
- Sonia Kruger as Tina Sparkle
- Kris McQuade as Charm Leachman, Barry's girlfriend
- John Hannan as Ken Railings
- Kerry Shrimpton as Pam Short
- Pip Mushin as Wayne Burns, Scott’s best friend
- Leonie Page as Vanessa Cronin, Wayne's partner and fiancé and Liz’s best friend
- Antonio Vargas as Rico, Fran's father
- Armonia Benedito as Ya Ya, Fran's grandmother
- Steve Grace as Luke, Kylie's dance partner
- Lauren Hewett as Kylie Hastings, Scott’s sister
- Lara Mulcahy as Natalie
- Jack Webster as Terry Best
- Michael Burgess as Merv Landon

== Production history ==
The film version of Strictly Ballroom was developed from an original short play of the same name. It drew on Luhrmann's own life experience—he had studied ballroom dancing as a child and his mother worked as a ballroom dance teacher in his teens and inspired by the life of Keith Bain (who grew up in the same town as Luhrmann). While studying at NIDA in the early 1980s, Luhrmann and a group of fellow students (including Catherine McClements, Sonia Todd and Nell Schofield) devised a short comedy-drama set in the cutthroat world of competitive ballroom dancing. This original 1984 NIDA production was a critical success and, after graduating, Luhrmann was invited to re-stage the play for the Czechoslovak Youth Drama Festival in Bratislava in 1986. He invited his school friend Craig Pearce to help him rewrite and expand the script. With its themes of artistic repression and underdogs battling against the odds, the play was a success at the festival, winning both the best director and best production awards.

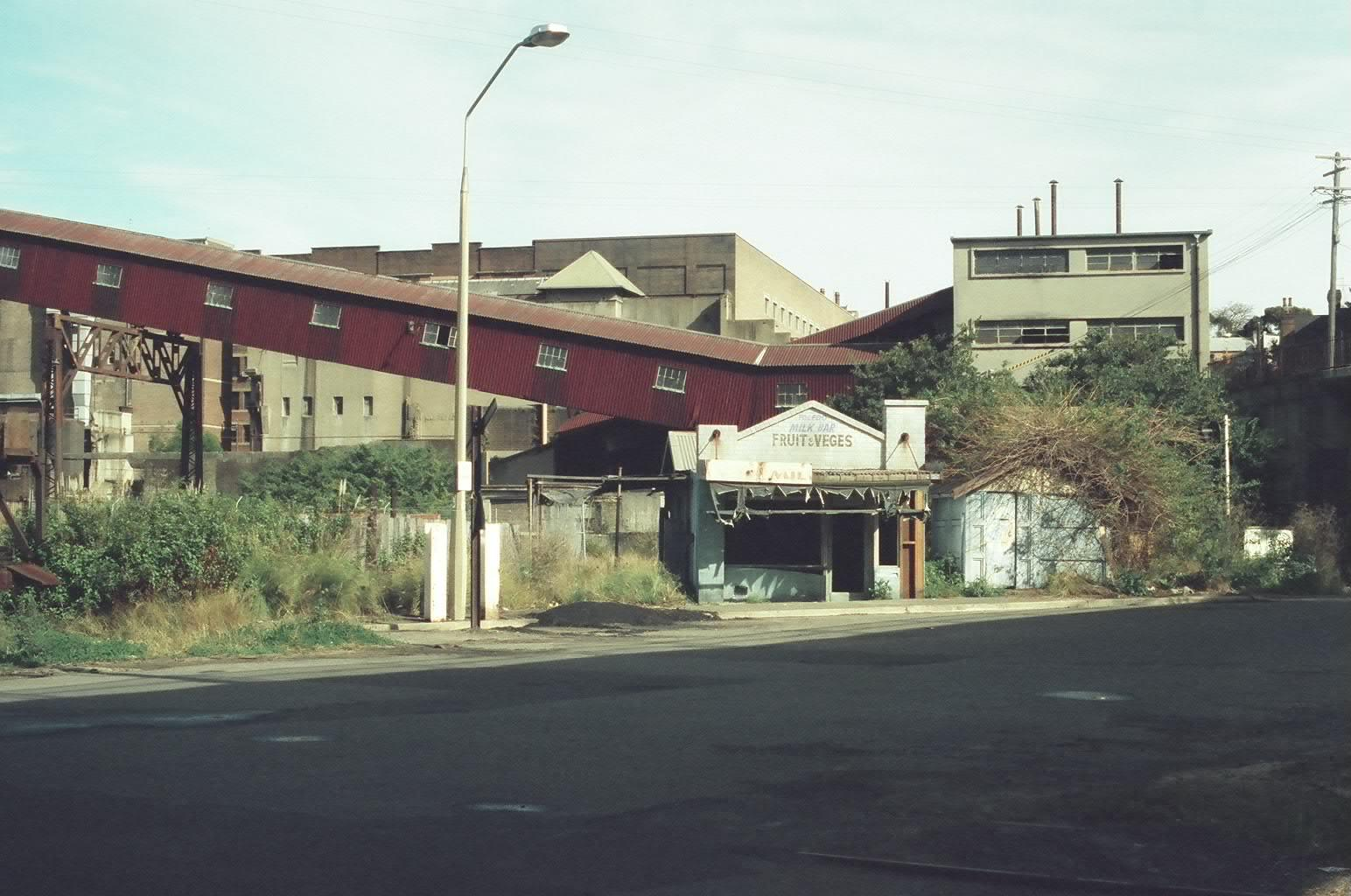
Strictly Ballroom film set used for Fran's family business and residence. (site since redeveloped, approx. to the Star City Casino complex, Pyrmont)

This led Luhrmann to direct more theatre productions back in Australia, and in 1988, as part of the Australian Bicentenary celebrations, the Sydney Theatre Company invited him to establish an experimental theatre ensemble, Six Years Old, which took up a residency at The Wharf Theatre for that year. Alongside Luhrmann and Pearce, the new company included one of the original NIDA collaborators, actor Catherine McClements, plus production designer Catherine Martin (whom Luhrmann subsequently married), set dresser Bill Marron and costume designer Angus Strathie, all of whom went on to collaborate with Luhrmann on his films. The group work-shopped the expanded version of the play, which had a trial season at the Brisbane Expo in 1988 before opening at the Wharf Studios on 24 September 1988.

During its successful run at the Wharf, the play was seen by an influential Australian music executive. Ted Albert was a leading record producer and music publisher, best known in Australia as the discoverer and original producer of 1960s pop sensations The Easybeats. By the time he saw Strictly Ballroom, Albert was the managing director of his family-owned music publishing company Albert Music (formerly J. Albert & Sons) and its subsidiary, the highly successful record label Albert Productions, which scored a string of hits in the 1970s and 1980s with acts including John Paul Young and AC/DC.

Albert's wife Antoinette (known as "Popsy") took him to see the play after seeing a newspaper ad; they loved the energy, colour and musicality of the play and Ted Albert immediately saw the potential to develop the play into a film using the musical resources available to him through Alberts' publishing and recording enterprises. Soon after, Ted set up the film production company M&A Productions with ex-Film Australia producer Tristram Miall; they tracked Luhrmann down through NIDA and approached him with the offer to transform his play into a movie. In its early stages, with the involvement of writer Andrew Bovell, the script took a more serious tone, including a subplot set around the trade union at the BHP Newcastle Steelworks. Luhrmann balked at the move towards naturalism and eventually, with Albert's agreement, the director brought in his old friend Craig Pearce, who was able to translate Luhrmann's theatrical vision into a workable screenplay.

The producers had difficulty in securing funding for the project, which mostly featured a cast of newcomers. The only "bankable names" in the cast were Barry Otto and screen veteran Bill Hunter, and although co-star Paul Mercurio was well known as a dancer through his work with the Sydney Dance Company, Strictly Ballroom was his first acting role. With the original budget set at over AUD 5 million, government film funding bodies were reluctant to back such a left-field project with few major names in the credits. The script was then pared back and the subplot dropped, but when Miall approached the Film Finance Corporation, he was told that they would not back such a high-budget film (in Australian terms) with a first-time director. He was told to replace Luhrmann, but he refused, promising to make further cuts. Miall and Albert then pared the budget down to AUD 3.3 million and the FFA then agreed to provide around 65%, on condition that the producers were able to raise the remaining AUD 1 million and secure a local distributor. They sent Luhrmann to the Cannes Film Festival in hopes of finding an overseas distributor, but this came to nothing. After returning to Australia, Miall and Luhrmann had a fortuitous meeting with Andrew Pike, head of the Canberra-based independent distribution company Ronin Films. Intrigued by Luhrmann's colourful pitch which involved sketches, set miniatures and pieces of costume, Pike agreed to back a limited local release, although he later admitted that, had he seen only the script, he would probably have turned it down.

Although the FFC funding was now in the pipeline, the production faced its most serious challenge when, on 11 November 1990, Ted Albert died suddenly from a heart attack (the film is dedicated to him). This threw the entire project into doubt, but Ted Albert's widow Popsy decided that it should go to completion in honour of her husband, so she took over as executive producer, with Miall as producer. With her blessing, Ted's family company Albert Music invested AUD 1 million, with the remaining AUD 300,000 sourced from private investors. Even after completion, the team were greeted with stiff resistance from exhibitors: Luhrmann recalled that one exhibitor walked out before the film had even finished, declaring that Luhrmann was ruined and that he would never work again.

The film was accepted for the Cannes Film Festival, but another tragedy struck just before its first screening—actress Pat Thomson, who played Scott's mother, was diagnosed with cancer and she died on April 18, 1992, only one month before its Cannes world premiere in May. Strictly Ballroom had its first public screening at midnight in the Un Certain Regard programme and proved to be an instant hit—the cast and crew received a fifteen-minute standing ovation, which was repeated the following night; it became one of the major hits of the festival, winning the Prix De Jeunesse and triggering a bidding war among international distributors. A deal was later struck for Miramax to theatrically release the film in the United States on February 12, 1993, with the film having earlier screened at the New York International Film Festival on September 26, 1992.

== Home media ==
On February 14, 1994, the film was released on VHS in the United States by Touchstone Home Video. This was a home video arm of The Walt Disney Company, who purchased Strictly Ballroom's American distributor Miramax on June 30, 1993. The film was released on DVD in the United States on 19 March 2002 by Buena Vista Home Entertainment, another home video arm of Disney. In Australia, the film was released on VHS in approximately late 1992, by Columbia Tri-Star Hoyts Video (a joint venture between Sony's Columbia Tri-Star Home Entertainment and Australian theater chain Hoyts). The film's Australian DVD release in early 2003 was handled by 20th Century Fox Home Entertainment South Pacific, the Australian home video arm of the Rupert Murdoch-owned 20th Century Fox. Fox had financed and released several of Luhrmann's films following his success with Strictly Ballroom, such as Romeo + Juliet (1996), Moulin Rouge! (2001), and later Australia (2008).

Miramax still own the U.S. rights to Strictly Ballroom, in addition to currently owning the U.S. rights to other Australian films they released in the 1990s, such as The Castle, Cosi and Muriel's Wedding. In 2010, Miramax was sold by The Walt Disney Company, with the studio being taken over by private equity firm Filmyard Holdings that same year. Filmyard licensed the home media rights for several Miramax titles to Lionsgate, and on April 30, 2013, Lionsgate Home Entertainment reissued the film on Blu-ray in the United States. In 2011, Filmyard licensed the Miramax library to streamer Netflix (which was then not available in Australia). This deal included Strictly Ballroom, and ran for five years, eventually ending on June 1, 2016.

Filmyard Holdings sold Miramax to Qatari company beIN Media Group during March 2016. In April 2020, ViacomCBS (now known as Paramount Skydance) acquired the rights to Miramax's library, after buying a 49% stake in the studio from beIN. Through this deal, Paramount Pictures became the U.S. distributor for Strictly Ballroom and the distributor for all 700 other films from Miramax's library. Paramount Home Entertainment went on to reissue many Miramax titles on home video, including reissuing Strictly Ballroom on Blu-ray on July 27, 2021, and on DVD on June 25, 2024. In the United States, it was also made available on Paramount's subscription streaming service Paramount+, as well as on their free streaming service Pluto TV.

== Reception ==
On the review aggregator website Rotten Tomatoes, 89% of 53 critics' reviews are positive, with an average rating of 7.5/10. The website's consensus reads: "As emotionally rich as it is eye-catching, Strictly Ballroom uses its infectious energy as the fuel for a modern dance classic with all the right moves." Metacritic, which uses a weighted average, assigned the film a score of 72 out of 100 based on 16 critics, indicating "generally favorable reviews". Not all major critics responded positively, with Australian film critic Adrian Martin calling it "amateurish and badly pitched in many respects", while American Jonathan Rosenbaum referred to it as "wretched" and "one of the more horrific and unpleasant movies I've seen in quite some time".

=== Box office ===
Strictly Ballroom previewed in Australia the week ending Wednesday, 19 August 1992 on 35 screens, grossing A$204,726 and finishing sixth at the Australian box office for the week. It officially opened on 20 August on 51 screens grossing A$1,216,376 in its opening week, placing at number 2 at the Australian box office, just behind Patriot Games on twice the number of screens. In its second week of release, it reached number one with a gross of A$1,307,825. It was knocked off number one the following week by Lethal Weapon 3 but returned in its sixth week of release after expanding to 85 screens where it remained for 7 weeks before being replaced by another local film, Romper Stomper. It was the highest-grossing film in Australia for the year with a gross of A$21,760,400 and the third highest-grossing Australian film of all time behind Crocodile Dundee and its sequel. It grossed US$11,738,022 in the United States and Canada and eventually took A$80 million at the worldwide box office, making it one of the most successful Australian films of all time.

=== Accolades ===
Strictly Ballroom competed in the Un Certain Regard section at the 1992 Cannes Film Festival and won the Youth Award for Foreign Film. It received thirteen nominations at the 1992 Australian Film Institute Awards and resulted in eight wins, including Best Film. The film earned eight nominations at the 46th British Academy Film Awards, including Best Film; it won Best Costume Design, Best Production Design, and Best Original Film Music. It was also nominated for Best Motion Picture – Musical or Comedy at the 51st Golden Globe Awards. In addition, the film was screened at several notable festivals to great critical acclaim, winning some major accolades, including the People's Choice Award at the Toronto International Film Festival and the Most Popular Film at the Vancouver International Film Festival.

Award	Category	Subject	Result
Australian Film Institute Awards	Best Film	Tristram Miall	Won
Australian Film Institute Awards	Best Achievement in Direction	Baz Luhrmann	Won
Australian Film Institute Awards	Best Performance by an Actor in a Leading Role	Paul Mercurio	Nominated
Australian Film Institute Awards	Best Performance by an Actress in a Leading Role	Tara Morice	Nominated
Australian Film Institute Awards	Best Performance by an Actor in a Supporting Role	Barry Otto	Won
Australian Film Institute Awards	Best Performance by an Actress in a Supporting Role	Gia Carides	Nominated
Australian Film Institute Awards	Best Performance by an Actress in a Supporting Role	Pat Thomson	Won
Australian Film Institute Awards	Best Screenplay	Baz Luhrmann and Craig Pearce	Won
Australian Film Institute Awards	Best Achievement in Cinematography	Steve Mason	Nominated
Australian Film Institute Awards	Best Achievement in Costume Design	Angus Strathie	Won
Australian Film Institute Awards	Best Achievement in Editing	Jill Bilcock	Won
Australian Film Institute Awards	Best Achievement in Production Design	Catherine Martin	Won
Australian Film Institute Awards	Best Achievement in Sound	Bruce Brown, Ben Osmo and Roger Savage	Nominated
Bogotá Film Festival	Best Film	Baz Luhrmann	Nominated
British Academy Film Awards	Best Film	Tristram Miall and Baz Luhrmann	Nominated
British Academy Film Awards	Best Actress in a Leading Role	Tara Morice	Nominated
British Academy Film Awards	Best Adapted Screenplay	Baz Luhrmann and Craig Pearce	Nominated
British Academy Film Awards	Best Costume Design	Angus Strathie and Catherine Martin	Won
British Academy Film Awards	Best Editing	Jill Bilcock	Nominated
British Academy Film Awards	Best Original Film Music	David Hirschfelder	Won
British Academy Film Awards	Best Production Design	Catherine Martin	Won
British Academy Film Awards	Best Sound	Antony Gray, Ben Osmo, Roger Savage, Ian McLoughlin and Phil Judd	Nominated
Cannes Film Festival	Un Certain Regard	Baz Luhrmann	Nominated
Cannes Film Festival	Award of the Youth for Foreign Film	Baz Luhrmann	Won
Chicago International Film Festival	Best First Feature Film	Baz Luhrmann	Won
Golden Globe Awards	Best Motion Picture – Musical or Comedy	Baz Luhrmann, Antoinette Albert and Tristram Miall	Nominated
London Film Critics Circle Awards	Newcomer of the Year	Baz Luhrmann	Won
Robert Awards	Best Foreign Film	Baz Luhrmann	Won
Toronto International Film Festival	People's Choice Award	Baz Luhrmann	Won
Vancouver International Film Festival	Most Popular Film	Baz Luhrmann	Won
20/20 Awards	Best Supporting Actress	Pat Thomson	Nominated
20/20 Awards	Best Original Screenplay	Baz Luhrmann and Craig Pearce	Nominated
20/20 Awards	Best Art Direction	Catherine Martin	Nominated
20/20 Awards	Best Costume Design	Angus Strathie	Nominated
20/20 Awards	Best Film Editing	Jill Bilcock	Nominated
20/20 Awards	Best Original Score	David Hirschfelder	Nominated

== Music ==
Among the songs featured on the soundtrack are:

- "The Blue Danube" by Johann Strauss II
- New versions of "Love is in the Air" and "Standing In The Rain" by John Paul Young. The film's version of "Love is in the Air" re-entered the Australian charts and became a Top 5 hit, peaking at #4 on the national chart in October 1992.
- A cover version of John Paul Young's "Yesterday's Hero" by Ignatius Jones
- "Perhaps, Perhaps, Perhaps" by Doris Day
- A cover version of Cyndi Lauper's "Time After Time" by Mark Williams and Tara Morice

Both "The Blue Danube" and "Time After Time" were played in the 1984 and 1986 Strictly Ballroom stage productions.

== Stage adaptation ==
In May 2011, it was announced that Strictly Ballroom would be adapted into a stage musical and premiere at the Sydney Lyric theatre. It premiered on 12 April 2014. The production moved to Her Majesty's Theatre, Melbourne in January 2015, and the Lyric Theatre, QPAC in Brisbane in September 2015.

The show received its British premiere on 30 November 2016 at the West Yorkshire Playhouse in Leeds. The show had its North American premier in Toronto at the Princess of Wales Theatre on 25 April 2017.

== Legacy ==
The film has become a staple of pop culture, being referenced in various media worldwide.

- Many television series have episodes with titles referencing the film, including Phenom ("Strictly Lunchroom"), Even Stevens, The Suite Life of Zack & Cody ("Loosely Ballroom") and Groove High ("Slightly Ballroom").
- The film is frequently referenced on the American iteration of Dancing with the Stars, as well as influencing the name of the original UK version Strictly Come Dancing. Sonia Kruger, who portrayed Tina Sparkle in the film, would also go on to host the Australian version of Dancing with the Stars.

== See also ==
- Cinema of Australia
- List of films set in Sydney
