= Australia (2008 film) =

2008 film by Baz Luhrmann

- Australian theatrical release poster
- Directed by: Baz Luhrmann
- Screenplay by: Baz Luhrmann; Ronald Harwood; Stuart Beattie; Richard Flanagan
- Story by: Baz Luhrmann
- Produced by: Baz Luhrmann; Catherine Knapman; G. Mac Brown
- Starring: Nicole Kidman; Hugh Jackman; David Wenham; Bryan Brown; Jack Thompson; David Gulpilil
- Cinematography: Mandy Walker
- Edited by: Dody Dorn; Michael McCusker
- Music by: David Hirschfelder
- Production companies: Bazmark Films; Dune Entertainment III; Ingenious Media; ScreenWest
- Distributed by: 20th Century Fox
- Release dates: 18 November 2008 (Sydney); 26 November 2008 (Australia and United States); 26 December 2008 (United Kingdom)
- Running time: 165 minutes
- Countries: Australia; United Kingdom; United States
- Language: English
- Budget: $130 million
- Box office: $211.8 million

Australia is a 2008 epic adventure drama film directed by Baz Luhrmann and starring Nicole Kidman and Hugh Jackman. The screenplay was written by Luhrmann and screenwriter Stuart Beattie, with Ronald Harwood and Richard Flanagan. The film is a character story, set between 1939 and 1942 against a dramatised backdrop of events across northern Australia at the time, such as the bombing of Darwin during World War II, and government policies of seizing half-caste Aboriginal children then in effect.

Production took place in Sydney, Darwin, Kununurra and Bowen. The film was released in cinemas on 26 November 2008 in Australia and the United States and on 26 December 2008 in the United Kingdom, with subsequent worldwide release dates throughout late December 2008, and January and February 2009, by 20th Century Fox. Australia received mixed reviews from critics and grossed $211 million worldwide.

On 26 November 2023, Faraway Downs, an extended version of the film presented in the form of a six-episode mini-series, debuted on Disney+ in Australia, Disney+ Hotstar in India and Hulu in the US.

== Plot ==
In 1939, shortly before World War II, English noblewoman Lady Sarah Ashley travels to Australia to force her philandering husband to sell his faltering cattle station, Faraway Downs. The huge station straddles Western Australia and the Northern Territory. Her husband sends an independent cattle drover, called "The Drover", to transport her to Faraway Downs. Lady Sarah's husband is murdered before she arrives; the authorities tell her the killer is an Aboriginal elder nicknamed King George. The station's manager, Neil Fletcher, secretly tries to gain control of Faraway Downs in order to sell it to meat tycoon Lesley 'King' Carney, thereby creating a complete cattle monopoly. At Darwin, Australian Army logistics officer Captain Dutton negotiates beef prices with Carney.

The childless Lady Sarah is captivated by Nullah, a half-Aboriginal boy living at the cattle station. Nullah, who has spied on Fletcher, reveals his plan to Lady Sarah, who fires Fletcher and runs the cattle station aided by her remaining staff. The next day, policemen arrive to take Nullah away to Mission Island as they have with other half-Aboriginal children. While evading them, Nullah's mother drowns when she hides with him in a water tower. Lady Sarah comforts Nullah by singing the song "Over the Rainbow". Nullah tells her that King George is his grandfather, and that like the Wizard of Oz, he, too, is a "magic man". Lady Sarah persuades Drover to take the cattle to Darwin for sale. Drover leads a team of seven riders, including his Aboriginal brother-in-law Magarri, Nullah, Lady Sarah, and the station's accountant Kipling Flynn, to drive the 1,500 cattle to Darwin. They encounter obstacles along the way, including a fire set by Carney's men that scares the cattle, resulting in the death of Flynn. Lady Sarah and Drover fall in love, and she grows to appreciate the Australian territory. The two share a romantic moment under a tree, where she reveals her inability to have children. The team drives the cattle through the treacherous Never Never desert with King George's help before reaching Darwin.

Lady Sarah, Nullah, and Drover live together at Faraway Downs for two years. Fletcher takes over Carney's cattle empire after orchestrating Carney's death in an accident and marrying his daughter, Catherine, all between 1940 and 1941. He returns to Faraway Downs and threatens Nullah's safety unless Lady Sarah sells her cattle station. Fletcher intimidates her by revealing that he murdered Lady Sarah's husband and that he is Nullah's father. Nullah intends to go on a walkabout with King George, much to Lady Sarah's dismay. She and Drover argue about what is best for Nullah, after which Drover leaves Faraway Downs. Nullah is apprehended by the authorities and sent to live on Mission Island. Lady Sarah, who has come to regard Nullah as her adopted son, vows to rescue him. Following the Japanese attack on Pearl Harbor, Darwin is evacuated. As World War II escalates, she goes to work as a radio operator alongside Catherine. When the Japanese attack Mission Island and Darwin in 1942, Lady Sarah fears that Nullah has been killed.

Drover returns to Darwin after hearing about the attack. He learns of Nullah's abduction to Mission Island and goes with Magarri, Ivan, and a young Christian brother to rescue him and the other children. Magarri sacrifices himself as a diversion so the others can flee. Meanwhile, Lady Sarah and the other townsfolk are being evacuated South by Captain Dutton. Drover and the children sail into port at Darwin as Nullah plays "Over the Rainbow" on his harmonica; Lady Sarah hears the music and the three are reunited. Fletcher, distraught at his financial ruin and Catherine's death during the Japanese attack, attempts to shoot Nullah with a soldier's rifle. As Lady Sarah and Drover rush to save Nullah, King George strikes Fletcher with a spear, killing him. Lady Sarah, Drover, and Nullah return to Faraway Downs. Sometime later, King George calls out to Nullah, who returns to the Outback with his grandfather as Lady Sarah and Drover look on.

== Cast ==
- Nicole Kidman as Lady Sarah Ashley, an English aristocrat who inherits the cattle station Faraway Downs after the death of her husband, Lord Maitland Ashley
- Hugh Jackman as The Drover, a drover who helps Lady Sarah Ashley move the cattle across the property
- David Wenham as Neil Fletcher, station manager who plans to take Faraway Downs from Lady Sarah Ashley
- Bryan Brown as King Carney, a cattle baron who owns much of the land in northern Australia
- Jack Thompson as Kipling Flynn, the alcoholic accountant at Faraway Downs
- David Gulpilil as King George, a magic tribal elder, grandfather of Nullah
- Brandon Walters as Nullah, a young Aboriginal boy whom Lady Sarah Ashley finds at Faraway Downs
- David Ngoombujarra as Magarri, the Drover's brother-in-law and best friend
- Ben Mendelsohn as Captain Dutton, a Darwin-based Australian Army officer in charge of beef supply
- Essie Davis as Catherine Carney, wife of Neil Fletcher and daughter of King Carney
- Barry Otto as Administrator Allsop, the Australian government's representative
- Kerry Walker as Myrtle Allsop
- Sandy Gore as Gloria Carney, King Carney's wife, and Catherine's mother
- Ursula Yovich as Daisy, the mother of Nullah
- Lillian Crombie as Bandy Legs
- Yuen Wah as Sing Song, a Cantonese cook at Faraway Downs
- Angus Pilakui as Goolaj, the Drover's second colleague and friend
- Jacek Koman as Ivan, the saloonkeeper and innkeeper in Darwin
- Tony Barry as Sergeant Callahan, the head of the Northern Territory police
- John Jarratt as Sergeant
- Ray Barrett as Ramsden, an old friendly fellow
- Max Cullen as Old Drunk
- Arthur Dignam as the Mission Island priest
- Matthew Whittet as the Mission Island Christian brother
- Eddie Baroo as Bull

== Production ==
Originally, Baz Luhrmann was planning to make a film about Alexander the Great starring Leonardo DiCaprio and Nicole Kidman, with a screenplay by David Hare. The director had built a studio in the northern Sahara but Alexander made by Oliver Stone was released first and after several years in development, Luhrmann abandoned the project to make a film closer to home. The visual effects were done by Animal Logic and The LaB Sydney. Luhrmann spent six months researching general Australian history. At one point he considered setting his film during the First Fleet, 11 ships that sailed from Britain in 1787 and set up the first colony in New South Wales. The director wanted to explore Australia's relationship with England and with its indigenous population. He decided to set the film between World Wars I and II in order to merge a historical romance with the Stolen Generations, where thousands of mixed-race Aboriginal children were forcibly removed from their families by the state and integrated into white society. Luhrmann has said that his film depicts "a mythologised Australia".

=== Casting ===
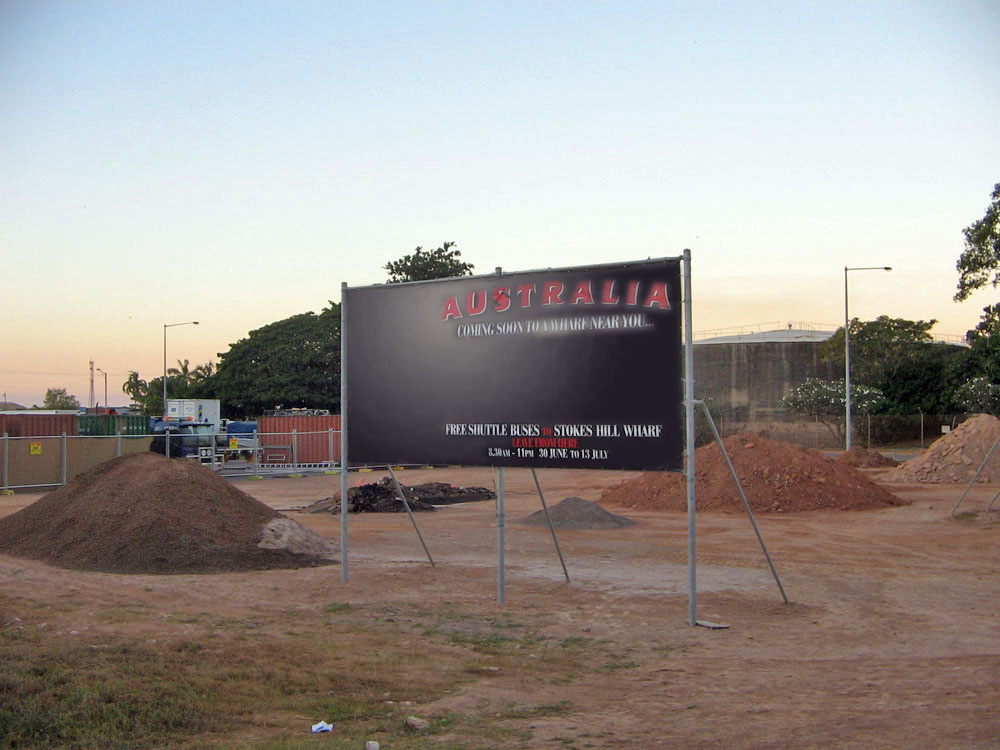
Australia sign board

In May 2005, Russell Crowe and Nicole Kidman entered negotiations to star in an untitled 20th Century Fox project written by director Baz Luhrmann and screenwriter Stuart Beattie, with Luhrmann directing the film. In May 2006, due to Crowe's demanding personal script approval before signing onto the project, Luhrmann sought to replace the actor with Heath Ledger. Crowe said he didn't want to work in an environment that was influenced by budgetary needs. About this casting issue, Luhrmann said, "it was hard pinning [Crowe] down. Every time I was ready, Russell was in something else, and every time he was ready, I would be having another turmoil". The following June, Luhrmann replaced Crowe with actor Hugh Jackman. In January 2007, actors Bryan Brown, Jack Thompson, and David Wenham were cast into Australia. In November 2006, Luhrmann began searching for an actor to play an Aboriginal boy of 8–10 years old and by April 2007, 11-year-old Brandon Walters was cast into the role of Nullah. Academic D. Bruno Starrs has written about how this casting choice and the decision to have the character of Nullah narrate the film reinforce its "left-leaning" message regarding the 'Stolen Generations'.

=== Pre-production ===
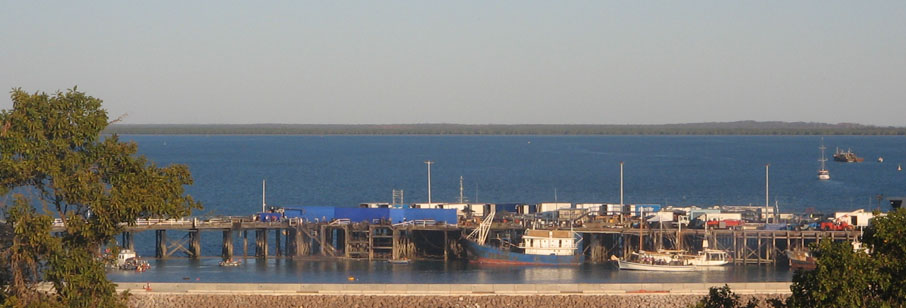
Filming of Australia at Stokes Hill Wharf

The untitled project was scheduled to begin production in September 2006, but scheduling conflicts and budget issues postponed the start of production to February 2007. In November 2006, Luhrmann explored The Kimberley to determine the amount of production to be shot there. In December 2006, Bowen was chosen as a filming location for a third of the production, portraying the look of Darwin. Bowen was chosen as a prospect due to the financing of $500,000 by the Queensland government. In April, Kununurra was chosen as another location for Australia, this time to serve as Faraway Downs, the homestead owned by Kidman's character. Entire sets were built from scratch, including a stand-alone set in the Queensland town of Bowen, the re-creation of war scenes near Darwin Harbour, and the construction of an outback homestead in Western Australia.

=== Costumes ===
Academy Award-winning costume designer Catherine Martin did extensive research for the film's outfits, studying archival images and newspapers from the 1930s and 1940s Australia. She also interviewed descendants of the original Darwin stockmen in order to find out if they "wore socks with his boots when he rode a horse, that's something you either get through a snapshot, or something you have to go talk to the people who lived there about". The Asian-inspired costumes of the film were intended to evoke the romanticism of the era, and one of the centrepieces of the film's costuming is a red chrysanthemum-printed Chinese cheongsam or qipao that was made for Nicole Kidman's character. The film received an Academy Award nomination for Best Costume Design.

=== Principal photography ===
The director planned to begin filming in March 2007. However, principal photography began on 30 April 2007 in Sydney, and Kidman found out that she was pregnant. She instantly withdrew from her next film, The Reader. Afterwards, the production moved to Bowen on 14 May.

Filming in Kununurra was a gruelling experience for the cast and crew with temperatures soaring to 43 °C (109 °F) which, one day, caused Kidman to faint while on a horse. In addition, she worked 14- and 15-hour days while dealing with morning sickness. While shooting in a remote region of Western Australia, the shoot had to be rescheduled when the Faraway Downs set, the homestead central to the film's story, was reduced to mud from torrential rain – the first in 50 years. The cast and crew went back to Sydney to shoot interior scenes until the expensive set dried out. In addition, at one point, the entire country's horses were in lock down over equine flu. Scenes using Darwin harbour were shot in July 2007, with parts of Stokes Hill Wharf blocked to the public and mini buses used to ferry tourists past the film set. Exterior scenes set at Darwin's colonial Government House were shot in Vaucluse, Sydney, at the historic harbour-side property, Strickland House.

Filming lasted five months, wrapping up at Fox Studios, Sydney, on 19 December 2007. In late April, Luhrmann titled his project Australia. Two other titles that he considered for the film had been Great Southern Land and Faraway Downs. On 11 August 2008, eight months after filming wrapped, several members of the cast and crew were back at Fox Studios, Sydney, to film pick up shots.

=== Post-production ===
Two weeks before the film's premiere, the Daily Telegraph erroneously reported that Luhrmann gave in to studio pressure after "intense" talks with executives and re-wrote and then re-shot the ending of Australia for a happier conclusion after "disastrous reviews" from test screenings. To counter these negative reports, the studio had Jackman and Kidman promoting Australia on The Oprah Winfrey Show, which dedicated an entire episode of the program to the film, and Fox co-chairman Tom Rothman spoke to the Los Angeles Times where he described the Telegraph article as "patently nonsensical. It's all too typical of the way the world works today that everybody picked up an unsourced, anonymous quote-filled story in a tabloid from Sydney and nobody ever bothered to check to see if it was accurate". Rothman also said that Luhrmann had final cut on his film. The director admitted that he wrote six endings in the drafts he authored, and shot three of them.

== Soundtrack ==
David Hirschfelder composed the score to Australia. Interpolated musical numbers include the jazz standards "Begin the Beguine", "Tuxedo Junction", "Sing Sing Sing (With a Swing)", and "Brazil". Edward Elgar's "Nimrod" from "Enigma" Variations is heard in the final scene of the film. Luhrmann hired singer Rolf Harris to record his wobble board for the opening credits, and Elton John composed and performed a song called "The Drover's Ballad", to lyrics by Luhrmann, for the end credits. Also used in the end credits is "By the Boab Tree", a song nominated for a 2008 Satellite Award, again with Luhrmann lyrics, performed by Sydney singer Angela Little. Little's rendition of "Waltzing Matilda" completes the end credits in some versions of the film. The jazz soundtrack to "Australia" was performed by the Ralph Pyle big band with clarinet solos by Andy Firth.

== Tourism tie-in ==
Tourism Western Australia spent $1 million on a campaign linked with the release of Australia in the United States, Canada, Japan, Europe and South Korea that ties in with an international Tourism Australia plan. Concerned about the recession and fluctuating international fuel prices, the tourism industry hoped that Luhrmann's film would deliver visitors from all over the world in the same kind of numbers that came to the country following the 1986 release of Crocodile Dundee, and follow the significant increase in visitors to New Zealand since 2001 after the release of The Lord of the Rings films. Federal Tourism Minister Martin Ferguson said, "This movie will potentially be seen by tens of millions of people, and it will bring life to little-known aspects of Australia's extraordinary natural environment, history and indigenous culture". Tourism Australia worked with Luhrmann and 20th Century Fox on a publicity campaign titled, "See the Movie, See the Country", based on movie maps and location guides, to transform the film into "a real-life travel adventure". In addition, the director made a $50 million series of commercials promoting the country.

== Critical reception ==
Australia received mixed reviews from critics. As of August 2024, the film holds a 53% approval rating on review aggregator Rotten Tomatoes, based on 216 reviews with an average rating of 6.10/10. The site's critical consensus reads, "Built on lavish vistas and impeccable production, Australia is unfortunately burdened with thinly drawn characters and a lack of originality." At Metacritic, which assigns a normalised rating to reviews, the film has a weighted average score of 53 out of 100, based on 38 critics, indicating "mixed or average" reviews. Audiences polled by CinemaScore gave the film an average grade of "A−" on an A+ to F scale.

=== Australian critics ===
Jim Schembri in The Sydney Morning Herald and The Age (Melbourne) wrote, "The film is fine, and never boring but, boy, is it overlong," and added, "More importantly, local films with black themes or major indigenous characters tend to do poorly, so if Australia succeeds here it could represent a breakthrough. We've always had trouble dealing with racial issues on film, so, in that regard, the film could be a landmark." Claire Sutherland, in her review for the Herald Sun (Melbourne) wrote, "A love letter to the Australian landscape and our history, Australia has international blockbuster written all over it", and Sydney's The Daily Telegraph wrote, "Kidman's screen presence is nothing short of radiant." In his review for The Australian (Sydney), David Stratton wrote, "It's not the masterpiece that we were hoping for, but I think you could say that it's a very good film in many ways. While it will be very popular with many people I think there's a slight air of disappointment after it all. Despite its flaws – and it certainly has flaws – I think Australia is an impressive and important film." Mark Naglazas of The West Australian (Perth) accused positive reviews from News Ltd press outlets of being manipulated by 20th Century Fox, as they were all owned by Rupert Murdoch's News Corporation at the time, calling Australia a film of "unrelenting awfulness" that "lurches drunkenly from crazy comedy to Mills and Boonish melodrama in the space of a couple of scenes".

=== British critics ===
Anne Barrowclough of The Times (London) gave the film four out of five stars, and states the film defies expectation and "in what turns out to be a multi-layered story it describes an Australia of the 1940s that is at once compellingly beautiful and breathtakingly cruel". Bonnie Malkin of The Daily Telegraph (London) stated: "Local critics had worried that the much-anticipated film Australia would present to the world a series of time-honoured Antipodean clichés. Their fears were well founded".

=== U.S. critics ===
Megan Lehmann, writing in the Hollywood Reporter, said that the film "defies all but the most cynical not to get carried away by the force of its grandiose imagery and storytelling," and it is "much less earnest than the trailer suggests, layered with a thin veneer of camp and a nod and a wink to accompany the requisite Aussie clichés," and the bottom line is "In epic style, Baz Luhrmann weaves his wizardry on Oz." Roger Ebert gave the film three stars out of four, noting "Baz Luhrmann dreamed of making the Australian Gone with the Wind, and so he has, with much of that film's lush epic beauty and some of the same awkwardness with a national legacy of racism."

David Ansen, in his review for Newsweek, wrote, "Kidman seems to blossom under Luhrmann's direction: she's funny, warm and charming, and the erotic charge between her and the gruff, hunky Jackman is delicious. In a solemn season, Australia's bold, kitschy, unapologetic artifice is a welcome respite." In her review for the New York Times, Manohla Dargis wrote, "This creation story about modern Australia is a testament to movie love at its most devout, cinematic spectacle at its most extreme, and kitsch as an act of aesthetic communion."

Andrew Sarris, in his review for the New York Observer, wrote, "Australia is clearly a labor of love, and a matter of national pride. It is also a bit of a mess. I must confess that I might have been harder on Mr Luhrmann's film if I had not remained entranced by Ms. Kidman ever since I first saw her in Phillip Noyce's Dead Calm in 1989; in my opinion, she has lost none of her luster in the 20 years since." In his review for Time, Richard Schickel wrote, "Have you seen everything Australia has on offer a dozen times before? Sure you have. It's a movie less created by director and co-writer Baz Luhrmann than assembled, Dr Frankenstein-style, from the leftover body parts of earlier movies. Which leaves us asking this question: How come it is so damnably entertaining?"

Joe Morgenstern of the Wall Street Journal, opines that, "In its heart of hearts Australia is an old-fashioned Western—a Northern, if you will—and all the more enjoyable for it." Nick Rogers, of FilmYap, adds that, "Luhrmann mythologized his homeland as American directors like John Ford did with Westerns—dramatic-license exaggerations that pay off in droves." Ann Hornaday, in her review for the Washington Post, wrote, "A wildly ambitious, luridly indulgent spectacle of romance, action, melodrama and revisionism, Australia is windy, overblown, utterly preposterous and insanely entertaining." In her review for Salon.com, Stephanie Zacharek wrote, "The second half of Australia, Luhrmann's attempt to pull off a wartime weeper, is so aggressively sentimental that it begins to feel more like punishment than pleasure. I left Australia feeling drained and weakened, as if I'd suffered a gradual poisoning at the hands of a mad scientist."

== Box office and home media sales ==
The film had better box office success in overseas markets and a disappointing gross in the United States – a pattern similar to Luhrmann's three previous films. As of November 2009, the film has grossed $211,342,221 in its worldwide releases. In Australia, the film grossed A$6.37 million in its opening weekend, setting the record for the highest grossing opening weekend for an Australian film and bumping the latest James Bond film Quantum of Solace to second place. Australia performed less well in the U.S., where it surprised box office analysts by opening only at #5, behind Quantum of Solace, Twilight, Bolt, and Four Christmases, and grossed $20 million opening weekend. However, Fox officials were reportedly happy with the numbers, as they said they were expecting only an $18 million opening gross for the film. They further pointed out that Baz Luhrmann's other films, like Moulin Rouge!, Strictly Ballroom, and Romeo + Juliet, started slowly and then built momentum. Australia eventually grossed $49,554,002 in the U.S., 23.4% of its total worldwide gross. Australia's ticket sales outside the United States are $161,788,219 from 51 countries. It opened at No. 1 in Spain, France, Australia, and Germany, and at No. 3 in Britain. Australia grossed $37,555,757 at the box office in Australia.

The DVD was released in the United States on 3 March 2009, opening at #2, and sold 728,000 units in the opening weekend, translating to revenue of $12.3 million. Australia sold almost two million DVDs in one month, 80% of what the studio predicted it would sell altogether. As of 15 November 2009, Australia had sold 1,739,700 units in the U.S., for a revenue of $27.9 million. Since being released in Australia, the DVD has sold double what the studio expected.

Australia is available to stream on Disney+ in Australia.

== Awards and nominations ==
Award	Category	Recipient(s)	Outcome
Academy Awards	Best Costume Design	Catherine Martin	Nominated
Australian Film Institute Awards	Best Supporting Actor	Brandon Walters	Nominated
Australian Film Institute Awards	Best Costume Design	Catherine Martin and Eliza Godman	Won
Australian Film Institute Awards	Best Original Music Score	David Hirschfelder	Nominated
Australian Film Institute Awards	Best Production Design	Catherine Martin, Ian Gracie, Karen Murphy and Beverley Dunn	Won
Australian Film Institute Awards	Best Sound	Wayne Pashley and Guntis Sics	Nominated
Australian Film Institute Awards	Best Visual Effects	Chris Godfrey, James E. Price, Andy Brown and Rob Duncan	Won
Australian Film Institute Awards	Best Young Actor	Brandon Walters	Nominated
Australian Film Institute Awards	Members' Choice Award	Baz Luhrmann, G. Mac Brown and Catherine Knapman	Nominated
Chicago Film Critics Association Awards	Best Cinematography	Mandy Walker	Nominated
Chicago Film Critics Association Awards	Most Promising Performer	Brandon Walters	Won
Critics' Choice Awards	Best Young Performer	Brandon Walters	Nominated
Film Critics Circle of Australia	Best Film	G. Mac Brown, Catherine Knapman and Baz Luhrmann	Nominated
Film Critics Circle of Australia	Best Supporting Actor	Brandon Walters	Won
Film Critics Circle of Australia	Best Cinematography	Mandy Walker	Won
Film Critics Circle of Australia	Best Music Score	David Hirschfelder	Nominated
Satellite Awards	Best Original Screenplay	Baz Luhrmann	Nominated
Satellite Awards	Best Art Direction and Production Design	Catherine Martin, Ian Gracie, Karen Murphy and Beverly Dunn	Won
Satellite Awards	Best Cinematography	Mandy Walker	Won
Satellite Awards	Best Costume Design	Catherine Martin	Nominated
Satellite Awards	Best Editing	Dody Dorn and Michael McCusker	Nominated
Satellite Awards	Best Original Score	David Hirschfelder	Nominated
Satellite Awards	Best Original Song	"By the Boab Tree" by Felix Meagher, Angela Little and Baz Luhrmann	Nominated
Satellite Awards	Best Sound	Anna Behlmer, Andy Nelson and Wayne Pashley	Nominated
Satellite Awards	Best Visual Effects	Chris Godfrey, James E. Price and Diana Giorgiutti	Won
Satellite Awards	Outstanding New Talent	Brandon Walters	Won
Saturn Awards	Best Performance by a Younger Actor	Brandon Walters	Nominated
Saturn Awards	Best Costumes	Catherine Martin	Nominated
St. Louis Film Critics Association Awards	Best Cinematography	Mandy Walker	Won
Teen Choice Awards	Choice Movie - Romance	Australia	Nominated
Teen Choice Awards	Choice Movie Actor: Drama	Hugh Jackman	Nominated
Teen Choice Awards	Choice Movie Actress: Drama	Nicole Kidman	Nominated
Young Artist Awards	Best Performance in an International Feature Film – Leading Young Performers	Brandon Walters	Won

== Faraway Downs ==
In June 2022, Bazmark Films and 20th Television announced a six-part limited television series titled Faraway Downs, a serialized version of the film featuring additional unused footage from the original production. Post-production on Faraway Downs took place in Queensland at Brisbane-based studios The Post Lounge and Resin.

Faraway Downs debuted on 21 October 2023 at the SXSW Sydney Festival and was released worldwide on 26 November 2023 on Hulu and Disney+. The limited series received mixed reviews from critics. On the review aggregator website Rotten Tomatoes, 56% of 16 critics' reviews are positive, with an average rating of 5.4/10. The website's consensus reads: "Faraway Downs may intrigue some as an interesting experiment, but Baz Luhrmann's reassessment of a past work doesn't fix the original Australia's deficiencies while adding to its bloat." Metacritic, which uses a weighted average, assigned the film a score of 48 out of 100, based on 9 critics, indicating "mixed or average" reviews.

=== Soundtrack ===
Faraway Downs: The Official Soundtrack

Soundtrack album by Various Artists
- Released: 24 November 2023
- Labels: DTS Production, Sony

Singles from Faraway Downs: The Official Soundtrack
- 1. "Anpuru Maau Kutjpa" Released: 17 November 2023

Faraway Downs: The Official Soundtrack was released digitally on 24 November 2023. At the 2024 ARIA Music Awards, the soundtrack won the ARIA Award for Best Original Soundtrack, Cast or Show Album.

=== Track listing ===
Faraway Downs: The Official Soundtrack
No.	Title	Writer(s)	Length
1.	"The Way" (performed by Budjerah and Matt Corby)	Budjerah Slabb, Matt Corby	2:27
2.	"Anpuru Maau Kutjpa" (performed by Electric Fields)	Mimili Community, Zaachariaha Fielding, Michael Ross	3:00
3.	"Life Goes On" (performed by King Stingray)	Theo Dimathaya Burarrwanga, Jerome Gotjirringu Yunupiŋu	3:36
4.	"Tjarpala" (performed by Electric Fields)	Zaachariaha Fielding, Michael Ross	1:58
5.	"Antara Maau Kutjpa" (performed by Electric Fields)	Mimili Community, Zaachariaha Fielding, Michael Ross	3:02
6.	"Amazing Grace" (performed by Jessica Mauboy featuring Dr G Yunupingu)	John Newton	3:43
7.	"Tjukurpa Spirit" (performed by Electric Fields)	Zaachariaha Fielding, David Hirschfelder, Michael Ross	1:33
8.	"Tjukurpa" (performed by Electric Fields)	Zaachariaha Fielding, Michael Ross	2:52
9.	"Ngula" (performed by Electric Fields)	Zaachariaha Fielding, Michael Ross	3:19
10.	"By the Boab Tree" (performed by Miiesha)	Angela Little, Baz Luhrmann, Felix Meagher, Anton Monsted, Schuyler Weiss	3:53
Total length:			29:28

== See also ==
- Cinema of Australia
- The Overlanders
- The Sundowners
