= Brigitte Broch =

German-Mexican production designer

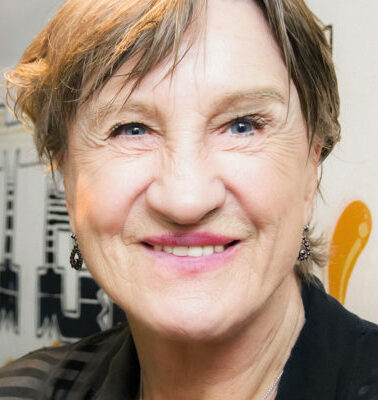
- Born: November 21, 1943 (age 82); Köslin, Pomerania, Germany (now part of Poland)
- Occupation: Production designer
- Years active: 1978-present

Brigitte Broch (born November 21, 1943), is a German-born Mexican production designer.

== Personal life ==
Broch is a naturalized citizen of Mexico.

== Oscar nominations ==
Both of these are in Best Art Direction

- 69th Academy Awards-Nominated for Romeo + Juliet. Nomination shared with Catherine Martin. Lost to The English Patient.
- 74th Academy Awards-Moulin Rouge!. Won. Shared with Catherine Martin.

== Selected filmography ==
- Romeo + Juliet (1996)
- Amores Perros (2000)
- Moulin Rouge! (2001)
- Real Women Have Curves (2002)
- 21 Grams (2003)
- Babel (2006)
- The Reader (2008)
- Vantage Point (2008)
- Biutiful (2010)
- Safe House (2012)
