= Baz Luhrmann =

Australian filmmaker (born 1962)

Baz Luhrmann AC
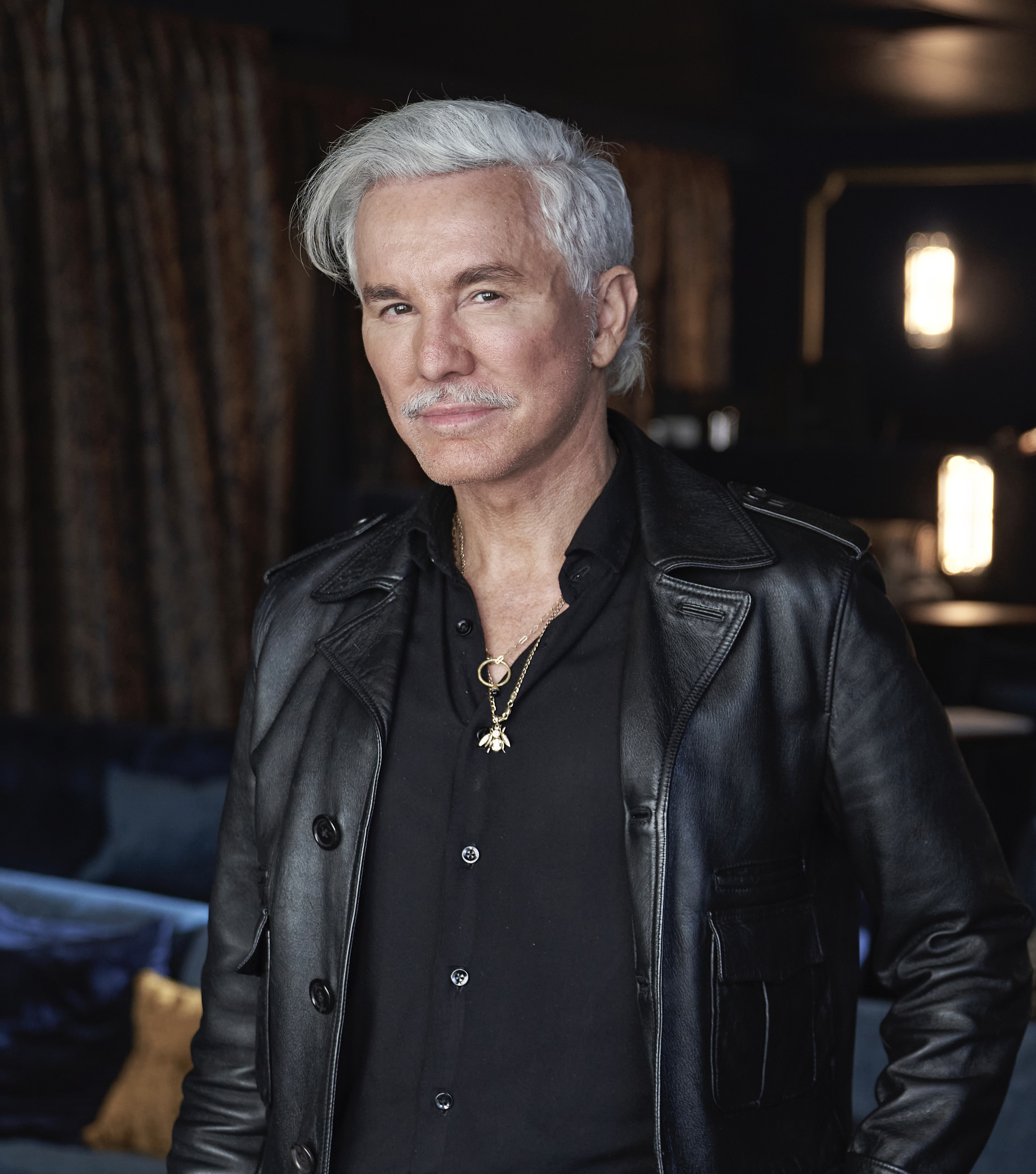
- Luhrmann in 2021
- Born: Mark Anthony Luhrmann; 17 September 1962 (age 64); Sydney, New South Wales, Australia
- Education: National Institute of Dramatic Art (BFA)
- Occupations: Film director; film producer; screenwriter; actor
- Years active: 1982–present
- Spouse: Catherine Martin (m. 1997)
- Children: 2
- Awards: Full list
- Website: bazmark.com

Bazmark Anthony "Baz" Luhrmann (/ˈlʊərmən/ LOOR-mən; born Mark Anthony Luhrmann, 17 September 1962) is an Australian film director, producer, writer and actor whose various projects extend from film and television into opera, theatre, music and the recording industries. He is regarded by some as a contemporary example of an auteur for his style and deep involvement in the writing, directing, design and musical components of all his work. In Australia, he is the most commercially successful native director, and four of his films are in the top ten highest worldwide grossing Australian films ever.

On the screen, he is best known for his Red Curtain Trilogy, comprising the romantic comedy film Strictly Ballroom (1992) and the romantic tragedies William Shakespeare's Romeo + Juliet (1996) and Moulin Rouge! (2001). Following the trilogy, projects included Australia (2008), The Great Gatsby (2013), Elvis (2022) and the television period drama The Get Down (2016) for Netflix. Additional projects include stage productions of Giacomo Puccini's La bohème for both Opera Australia and Broadway, and Strictly Ballroom the Musical (2014). In September 2025 his first documentary, EPiC: Elvis Presley in Concert premiered at the Toronto International Film Festival.

Luhrmann is known for his Grammy Award-nominated soundtracks for Moulin Rouge! and for The Great Gatsby, as well as his record label House of Iona, a co-venture with RCA Records. Serving as producer on all his musical soundtracks, he also holds writing credits on many of the individual tracks. His album Something for Everybody features music from many of his films and also includes his hit "Everybody's Free (To Wear Sunscreen)".

== Early and personal life ==
Mark Anthony Luhrmann was born in Sydney, New South Wales, on 17 September 1962. His mother, Barbara Carmel (née Brennan), was a ballroom dance teacher and dress shop owner, and his father, Leonard Luhrmann, ran a petrol station and a cinema. He was raised in Herons Creek, a tiny rural settlement in mid-northern New South Wales. He attended St Joseph's Hastings Regional School, Port Macquarie (1975–1978); St Paul's Catholic College, performing in the school's version of Shakespeare's Henry IV, Part 1; and Narrabeen Sports High School, where he met his future collaborator Craig Pearce.

Luhrmann received the nickname "Baz" at school, given to him because of his hairstyle, the name coming from the puppet character Basil Brush. While still in high school, Luhrmann changed his name by deed poll to Bazmark, joining his nickname and birth name together. In 1980 Luhrmann graduated from high school, and in the same year was cast opposite Judy Davis in the Australian film Winter of Our Dreams. In 1982, using the money he had earned from film and television work, he co-founded, with Nell Schofield, Gabrielle Mason, and Julia Little, their own theatre company, The Bond Theatre Company. The four had recently been turned down by NIDA. In March the company performed American Days at the pavilion at Sydney's Bondi Beach. At the same time, he conceived and appeared in a controversial television documentary, Kids of the Cross, where Luhrmann, embedded as a character, lived with a group of street kids. In 1983 he enrolled in an acting course at the National Institute of Dramatic Art. He graduated in 1985 alongside Sonia Todd, Catherine McClements and Justin Monjo.

On 26 January 1997 he married Catherine Martin, a production designer, costume designer and film producer; the couple have two children. When asked in interviews about his sexuality, Luhrmann has said that he sees all sexual possibilities.

Luhrmann supports the Melbourne Demons in the Australian Football League.

== Career ==
=== Film ===
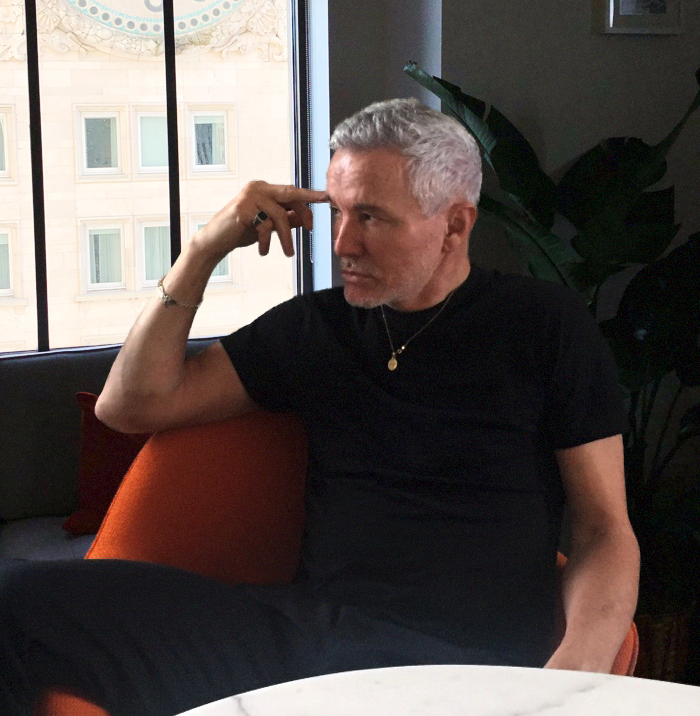
Luhrmann in 2018

After theatrical successes, including the short play Strictly Ballroom which premiered at the Wharf Theatre, Luhrmann moved into film. He made his directorial debut with the 1992 film version of Strictly Ballroom.

Luhrmann's modern film interpretation Romeo + Juliet (1996), based on the William Shakespeare play and starring Leonardo DiCaprio and Claire Danes, defeated Titanic at the BAFTAs for best direction, music and screenplay. The film was celebrated at the Berlin Film Festival, where it was recognised with the Golden Bear award for direction and Silver Bear for DiCaprio's performance. Luhrmann also produced both volumes of the soundtrack album, which went triple-platinum. The film earned $46,338,728 in the Domestic Box Office, and $101,203,653 in the International Box Office, resulting in the film grossing over $147,542,381 worldwide. Baz Luhrmann’s unique approach to taking on a classic, such as Romeo and Juliet, was inspired by a trip to India where he watched a Bollywood film that found a successful balance of comedy and tragedy. He observed the audience’s positive response to this contrast in genres and therefore decided to use these themes and ideas in his adaptation of Romeo and Juliet. In 1993, Baz Luhrmann pitched his ambitious idea to 20th - Century Fox whereby the sceptical Fox executives struggled to grasp how he could successfully use Elizabethan rhyming couplets as a single form of dialogue. Whilst Baz Luhrmann continued working on his developments, it was made clear that Fox had another, more traditional, version of Romeo and Juliet in progression with Ethan Hawke to star as Romeo and Broadway theatre director Desmond McAnuff set to direct. Luhrmann, with the goal of winning over Fox, persuaded Leonardo DiCaprio to travel to Sydney and take on the role of Romeo. Once enough footage was created for a worthy pitch, Luhrmann re-pitched his idea with Leonardo DiCaprio officially on board to Fox whereby they parked the McAnuff version and proceeded with Luhrmann’s adaptation.

Luhrmann's Academy Award-winning musical Moulin Rouge! (2001), set in the Montmartre quarter of Paris at the dawn of the 20th century, told the story of an English poet and writer, Christian (Ewan McGregor), who falls in love with the star of the Moulin Rouge, cabaret actress and courtesan, Satine (Nicole Kidman). The film was praised by its adherents, including the musical directors Robert Wise and Stanley Donen, as having re-invented the modern musical, blending decades of popular music in remixes and mash-ups. The production design was orchestrated by Catherine Martin, choreography by John O’Connell, editing by Jill Bilcock , Donald McAlpine as director of photography and Marius DeVries & Craig Armstrong collaborated on the soundtrack. The film was named one of the AFI's top ten films of 2001 and in 2010 was chosen as the top film of the 2000s decade in a poll of 150,000 respondents in the United Kingdom. At the 59th Annual Golden Globes, Moulin Rouge! took home the awards for Best Motion Picture, Best Actress and Best Original Score. The film also gave birth to a successful soundtrack album, produced by Luhrmann, which sold more than seven million copies and went double-platinum, led by the Grammy-winning number one hit single "Lady Marmalade".

Luhrmann's 2008 historical epic Australia featured some of the country's most celebrated actors, including Nicole Kidman, Hugh Jackman, and David Gulpilil. Starting just before World War II, the film blended a nostalgic romance with major events from Australian history, including the Bombing of Darwin, and the true story of the Stolen Generations, wherein thousands of mixed-race Aboriginal children were stolen from their families by the state and forcibly integrated into white society. The movie's racial politics were controversial for their time, and notably, its production coincided with Prime Minister Kevin Rudd's 2008 Apology to Australia's Indigenous peoples. Marcia Langton, a professor of Australian indigenous studies at the University of Melbourne, publicly supported the film, saying "Luhrmann depicts with satirical sharpness the racial caste system of that time... In his imagined cinema of the 1940s, the spatial and social shape of racism is reconstructed with such exact detail, I felt I had been transported back to my own childhood." While achieving modest box office success in the United States, the film was very successful in Europe, maintaining the #1 slot at the box office for many weeks in France, Germany, Spain, Italy and the Scandinavian countries. It is the second-highest grossing Australian film of all time, next to Crocodile Dundee and ahead of Happy Feet.

In 2013 Luhrmann adapted F. Scott Fitzgerald's novel The Great Gatsby, shot in 3D, starring Leonardo DiCaprio as Jay Gatsby, Tobey Maguire as Nick Carraway, Carey Mulligan as Daisy Buchanan, Joel Edgerton as Tom Buchanan, the Australian newcomer Elizabeth Debicki as Jordan Baker, and Amitabh Bachchan as Meyer Wolfsheim. For the film, Luhrmann and the costume/production designer Catherine Martin collaborated with Prada, Brooks Brothers and Tiffany & Co. to create period-inspired dresses, suits and jewellery based on their own archives and true to the book's own references to luxury brands. Prada specifically collaborated with the films costume designer Catherine Martin to create over forty looks for the movie, each of the pieces inspired by originals from the Prada and Miu Miu archive. Not only does this decision to collaborate with designer brands stylistically enhance the film, it also represents the core messages and values laced throughout the film - ‘everything is possible and plausible in a Gatsby dimension’. The film grossed $144,840,419 in the Domestic Box Office, and $208,610,942 in the International Box Office, causing the film to gross over $353 million worldwide, making it Luhrmann's highest-grossing film to date. Alongside this, The Great Gatsby sold around an estimated total of $49,711,624 worth of DVD and Blue-Ray sales. Critic Richard Roeper described the adaptation as "the best attempt yet to capture the essence of the novel" while Fitzgerald's granddaughter praised it, saying "Scott would have been proud." The following year, at the 86th Academy Awards, the film won in both its nominated categories: Best Production Design and Best Costume Design beating the likes of 12 Years a Slave and American Hustle. The soundtrack, produced by Luhrmann, Anton Monsted and Jay-Z, sought to blend the music of the Jazz Age with contemporary hip hop as two historical analogues. Featured artists included Lana Del Rey, Jack White, Sia, Beyoncé, will.i.am, The xx and Florence and the Machine; the soundtrack also included score from the film's composer and Luhrmann's repeat collaborator Craig Armstrong. Around three minutes into the film “No Church in the Wild” by Kanye West and Jay-Z starts playing whilst Toby Maguire’s character introduces New York as a setting within the film. Alongside this, “No Church in the Wild” was used as the chosen song for the film’s trailer. The film’s album marked the biggest digital sales week for a soundtrack in Billboard history at that time, and peaked at number two on the US Billboard 200 chart.

Luhrmann's next project was Elvis, a biopic about Elvis Presley focusing on his relationship with Colonel Tom Parker. It debuted at the Cannes Film Festival in May 2022. Tom Hanks played Parker and Austin Butler portrayed Presley, having been cast after a series of screen tests, as well as music and performance workshops. The film opened in June 2022, becoming a box office hit and receiving eight Academy Award nominations, including Best Picture and Best Actor for Butler. In January 2023, Luhrmann signed a first-look deal with Warner Bros. Pictures after working with the studio on Elvis.

In September 2024 it was reported that Luhrmann's next narrative feature film would be an adaption of the life of Joan of Arc, titled Jehanne d'Arc. The project was described as "The ultimate teenage girl coming of age story, set in the Hundred Years' War." He is co-writing this adaptation with playwright Ava Pickett.

Luhrmann's latest film is EPiC: Elvis Presley in Concert, a documentary and concert film featuring long-lost footage from his epochal residency in Las Vegas from 1969 into the 1970s, as well as previously unseen footage from Elvis: That's the Way It Is and Elvis on Tour uncovered during production of Luhrmann's Elvis biopic. It premiered on 6 September 2025 at the Toronto International Film Festival.

=== Television ===
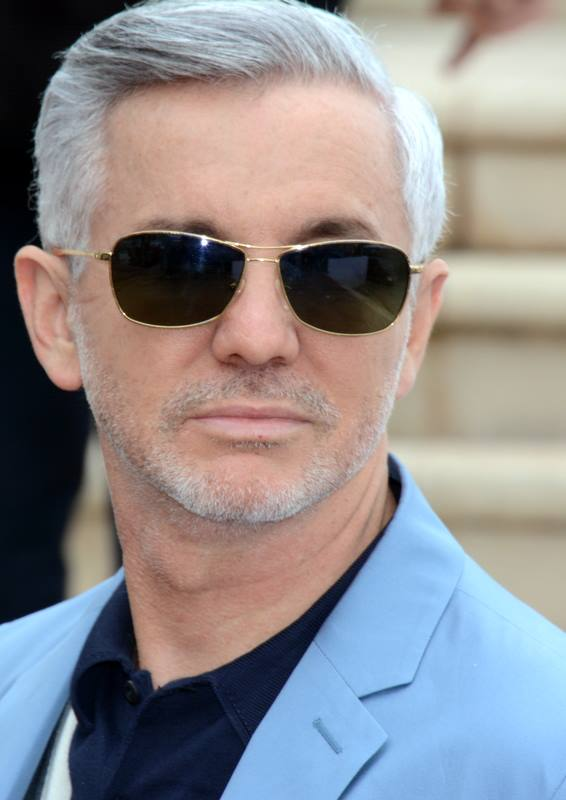
Luhrmann at the 2013 Cannes Film Festival

In 2016 Luhrmann collaborated with the playwright Stephen Adly Guirgis on the Netflix series The Get Down about the birth of hip hop in the 1970s. For the series, Luhrmann brought on Nas, Grandmaster Flash, Kurtis Blow and DJ Kool Herc as producers, to help to tell the story of the rise of hip hop, punk, and disco during shifting cultural and political transformation through his unique brand of magical realism. The series featured two parts, praised for its vibrant music, fresh cast and authenticity, due to the involvement of many of the era's key historical figures in central roles to the show's development. Part One got a score of 77% from the online review-aggregator Rotten Tomatoes, while Part Two holds a critic score of 86%.

== Filmography ==
=== Director ===
Film

Year	Title	Director	Writer	Producer
1992	Strictly Ballroom	Yes	Yes	No
1996	Romeo + Juliet	Yes	Yes	Yes
2001	Moulin Rouge!	Yes	Yes	Yes
2008	Australia	Yes	Yes	Yes
2013	The Great Gatsby	Yes	Yes	Yes
2022	Elvis	Yes	Yes	Yes
2025	EPiC: Elvis Presley in Concert	Yes	No	Yes

Television

Year	Title	Creator	Director	Writer	Executive producer	Notes
2016–2017	The Get Down	Yes	Yes	Yes	Yes	Directed and co-wrote episode "Where There Is Ruin, There Is Hope for a Treasure"

=== Screen actor ===
Television

Year	Title	Role	Notes
1981–82	A Country Practice	Jerry Percival	6 episodes
1983	Kids of the Cross	Himself	Documentary film
2023	Agent Elvis	The Director (voice)	Episode: "Cocaine Tuesdays"

Film

Year	Title	Role	Notes
1981	Winter of Our Dreams	Pete	
1982	The Dark Room	First student	
1982	The Highest Honor	Able Seaman A. W. Huston	
2013	The Great Gatsby	Waiter	Uncredited

=== Stage actor ===
Year	Title	Role	Notes
1982	American Days	Gary	Performed at Bondi Pavillon, Sydney
1982	Are You Lonesome Tonight?	Unknown	Performed at Nimrod Downstairs, Sydney
1983	Fanshen	Peasant	Performed at NIDA, Sydney
1984	Holiday Makers	Unknown	Performed at NIDA
1984	All's Well That Ends Well	Dumain Brother	Performed at NIDA
1984, 1986	Strictly Ballroom	Ross Pierce	Also director, Performed at NIDA in 1984, and in Bratislava in 1986
1985	Dreamplay	background guy	Performed at NIDA. Directed by Jim Sharman
1985	Funeral Games	background guy	Part of the Hallucinogenics? 3 plays from the 60s event. Performed at NIDA
1985	Chamber Music	background guy	Part of the Hallucinogenics? 3 plays from the 60s event. Performed at NIDA
1985	The Greeks	background guy	Trilogy: The War, The Murders, The Gods. Performed at NIDA, and St Martin's Youth Arts Centre, Melbourne.
1985	Once in a Lifetime	background guy	Performed at NIDA
1986	Crocodile Creek	–	Directed for the New Moon Theatre Company in Rockhampton. Amateur musical production set in the Queensland goldfields
1989	The Conquest of the South Pole	Unknown	Performed at Belvoir St Theatre, Sydney

== Other ventures ==
Luhrmann, who started appearing on TV screen in 1981, appeared in Winter of Our Dreams, directed by John Duigan. By 1992, he had directed the music video "Love Is in the Air" by John Paul Young. The next year, Luhrmann staged his interpretation of A Midsummer Night's Dream by Benjamin Britten. In 1997 when the CD of Something for Everybody was released, it featured Luhrmann's films and operas. Following the success, he created and managed a company Bazmark along with his wife, Catherine Martin.

In 1997 as a music producer, Luhrmann was credited on "Everybody's Free", a spoken word song in Europe, Australia and the Americas. Luhrmann directed a 2004 commercial for Chanel N° 5 entitled N° 5 the Film. On Charlie Rose interview, he told Rose that the commercial was based on the 1953 film, Roman Holiday. The next year 2005, Luhrmann was appointed an Ambassador for the Australian Theatre for Young People, and in next three years, he was asked by the Prime Minister of Australia Kevin Rudd to make adverts for the promotion of tourism in Australia. In 2009 during the 81st Academy Awards in February, Luhrmann put together a number dedicated to musicals which consisted of Hugh Jackman, Beyoncé, Zac Efron, Vanessa Hudgens, Dominic Cooper and Amanda Seyfried. In September of same year, he appeared as a guest judge on Dancing with the Stars.

He produced Christina Aguilera and Nile Rodgers' 2016 single "Telepathy", along with Elliott Wheeler.

Luhrmann and the painter Vincent Fantauzzo embarked on an art initiative which took them to India, where they created artworks on walls of hotels, in the streets of Rajasthan and on 17th-century forts in 2010. He also shot the campaign film The Secret Life of Flowers. Though mostly hands-off with the stage production of Moulin Rouge!, Luhrmann produced its Broadway cast recording in 2019.

Luhrmann led the jury at the 2023 Red Sea International Film Festival held in Jeddah, Saudi Arabia.

In January 2025, Luhrmann collaborated with wife Catherine Martin and Jon Neidich of Golden Age Hospitality on Monsieur, a new bar in New York City's East Village with a gothic medieval aesthetic, inspired by the East Village nightlife in the late 1960s and early 70s.

In 2025 the couple has designed the private carriage Celia for the Belmond British Pullman luxury train, rebuilt from a former Brighton Belle motorcar, which has entered service in April 2026. The vehicle features a capacity of 12 passengers, a bar, a dining and a lounge area.

== Influence and legacy ==
Luhrmann has cited Italian grand opera as a major influence on his work and has also given a nod to other theatrical styles, such as Bollywood films, as having influenced his style. Luhrmann was a ballroom dancer as a child and his mother taught ballroom dancing which was an inspiration for Strictly Ballroom. Luhrmann's favourite films are Star 80, 8½, War and Peace, Medium Cool and Fitzcarraldo.

Luhrmann's influence has extended outside the traditional realm of media and entertainment. Deeply involved in the fashion and art worlds, Luhrmann's No. 5 the Film for Chanel not only holds a Guinness World Record for the highest budget for an advertising commercial ever produced, but pioneered the now commonplace genre of fashion film and branded content. Luhrmann works closely with the Metropolitan Museum of Art's Anna Wintour Costume Center, having chaired the annual Met Gala as well as producing a short film for the museum, celebrating Miuccia Prada and Elsa Schiaparelli. More recently, he and his wife Catherine Martin have adapted their style for projects in events, retail, architecture and design with Barneys New York and developer and hotelier Alan Faena.

In November 2022, Lurhmann featured in Desert Island Discs on BBC Radio 4; his choice of favourite track, book and luxury item were "Che gelida manina" from Puccini's La bohème (sung by Pavarotti), Tolstoy's War and Peace, and a silk eye mask respectively.

== Awards and honours ==
Luhrmann was appointed a Companion of the Order of Australia in the 2025 King's Birthday Honours for "eminent service to the arts as a filmmaker, to the theatre, to cultural heritage, and to the development of artistic talent".

Year	Title	Academy Awards		BAFTA Awards		Golden Globe Awards		AACTA Awards	
Year	Title	Nominations	Wins	Nominations	Wins	Nominations	Wins	Nominations	Wins
1992	Strictly Ballroom			8	3	1		13	8
1996	Romeo + Juliet	1		7	4			1	
2001	Moulin Rouge!	8	2	12	3	6	3	10	5
2008	Australia	1						8	3
2013	The Great Gatsby	2	2	3	2			14	12
2022	Elvis	8		9	4	3	1	16	12
Total		20	4	39	12	10	4	62	40

== Media appearances ==
- In September 2009, Luhrmann made an appearance as a guest judge on Dancing with the Stars. Luhrmann participated on the NPR radio quiz program Wait Wait... Don't Tell Me! in 2013.
- Luhrmann's song "Everybody's Free (To Wear Sunscreen)" was discussed in March 2020 on the BBC Radio 5 Live Chiles on Friday programme with Charlotte McDonald. It featured an interview from the documentary with Australian voice over artist, Lee Perry.
