= AACTA Award for Best Costume Design =

Australian film award

- Country: Australia
- Presented by: Australian Academy of Cinema and Television Arts (AACTA)
- First award: 1977
- Currently held by: Jenny Beavan, Furiosa: A Mad Max Saga (2024)
- Website: http://www.aacta.org

The AACTA Award for Best Costume Design is an accolade given by the Australian Academy of Cinema and Television Arts (AACTA), a non-profit organisation whose aim is to "identify, award, promote and celebrate Australia's greatest achievements in film and television." The award is handed out at the annual AACTA Awards, which rewards achievements in feature film, television, documentaries and short films. From 1977 to 2010, the category was presented by the Australian Film Institute (AFI), the Academy's parent organisation, at the annual Australian Film Institute Awards (known as the AFI Awards). When the AFI launched the Academy in 2011, it changed the annual ceremony to the AACTA Awards, with the current prize being a continuum of the AFI Award for Best Costume Design. Terry Ryan has received the most awards in this category with five.

== Winners and nominees ==
In the following table, the years listed correspond to the year of film release; the ceremonies are usually held the same year.^{[A]} The films and costume designers in bold and in yellow background have won are the winners. Those that are neither highlighted nor in bold are the nominees. When sorted chronologically, the table always lists the winning film first and then the other nominees.

Winner

Year	Film	Costume designer(s)
**AFI Awards**
**1970s**
**1977** (19th)
**1977** (19th)	**The Picture Show Man**	**Judith Dorsman**
**1977** (19th)	Let the Balloon Go	Ron Williams
**1977** (19th)	Oz	Robbie Perkins
**1977** (19th)	Storm Boy	Helen Dyson
**1978** (20th)
**1978** (20th)	**Newsfront**	**Norma Moriceau**
**1978** (20th)	The Chant of Jimmie Blacksmith	Bruce Finlayson
**1978** (20th)	The Getting of Wisdom	Anna Senior
**1978** (20th)	The Mango Tree	Patricia Forster
**1979** (21st)
**1979** (21st)	**My Brilliant Career**	**Anna Senior**
**1979** (21st)	The Last of the Knucklemen	Kevin Regan
**1979** (21st)	Mad Max	Clare Griffin
**1979** (21st)	The Night the Prowler	Luciana Arrighi
**1980s**
**1980** (22nd)
**1980** (22nd)	**Breaker Morant**	**Anna Senior**
**1980** (22nd)	The Chain Reaction	Norma Moriceau
**1980** (22nd)	Harlequin	Terry Ryan
**1980** (22nd)	Manganinnie	Graham Purcell
**1981** (23rd)
**1981** (23rd)	**Fatty Finn**	**Norma Moriceau**
**1981** (23rd)	The Club	Ruth De la Lande
**1981** (23rd)	Gallipoli	Terry Ryan and Wendy Weir
**1981** (23rd)	Hoodwink	Ross Major
**1982** (24th)
**1982** (24th)	**Mad Max 2**	**Norma Moriceau**
**1982** (24th)	The Pirate Movie	Aphrodite Kondos
**1982** (24th)	Starstruck	Luciana Arrighi and Terry Ryan
**1982** (24th)	We of the Never Never	Camilla Rountree
**1983** (25th)
**1983** (25th)	**Careful, He Might Hear You**	**Bruce Finlayson**
**1983** (25th)	Phar Lap	Anna Senior
**1983** (25th)	Undercover	Kristian Fredrikson
**1983** (25th)	The Year of Living Dangerously	Terry Ryan
**1984** (26th)
**1984** (26th)	**Silver City**	**Jan Hurley**
**1984** (26th)	One Night Stand	Ross Major
**1984** (26th)	Street Hero	Norma Moriceau
**1984** (26th)	Strikebound	Jennie Tate
**1985** (27th)
**1985** (27th)	**Rebel**	**Roger Kirk**
**1985** (27th)	Bliss	Helen Hooper
**1985** (27th)	The Boy Who Had Everything	Ross Major
**1985** (27th)	The Coca-Cola Kid	Terry Ryan
**1986** (28th)
**1986** (28th)	**Kangaroo**	**Terry Ryan**
**1986** (28th)	Burke & Wills	George Liddle
**1986** (28th)	For Love Alone	Jennie Tate
**1986** (28th)	Playing Beatie Bow	George Liddle
**1987** (29th)
**1987** (29th)	**The Umbrella Woman**	**Steve Dobson**
**1987** (29th)	Bullseye	George Liddle
**1987** (29th)	The Place at the Coast	Jennie Tate
**1987** (29th)	Those Dear Departed	Roger Ford
**1988** (30th)
**1988** (30th)	**The Navigator: A Medieval Odyssey**	**Glenys Jackson**
**1988** (30th)	Boulevard of Broken Dreams	Cheryl McCloud
**1988** (30th)	Mull	Jeanie Cameron
**1988** (30th)	Spirits of the Air, Gremlins of the Clouds	Angela Tonks and Mathu Anderson
**1989** (31st)
**1989** (31st)	**What the Moon Saw**	**Rose Chong**
**1989** (31st)	Georgia	Aphrodite Kondos
**1989** (31st)	Ghosts... of the Civil Dead	Karen Everett
**1989** (31st)	Sons of Steel	Gary L. Keady, Nicholas Huxley and Nicola Braithwaite
**1990s**
**1990** (32nd)
**1990** (32nd)	**Blood Oath**	**Roger Kirk**
**1990** (32nd)	Hunting	Aphrodite Kondos
**1990** (32nd)	Two Brothers Running	Michelle Leonard
**1990** (32nd)	Weekend with Kate	Michelle Leonard
**1991** (33rd)
**1991** (33rd)	**Spotswood**	**Tess Schofield**
**1991** (33rd)	Aya	Jennie Tate
**1991** (33rd)	Isabelle Eberhardt	Mic Cheminal
**1991** (33rd)	Waiting	Murray Picknett
**1992** (34th)
**1992** (34th)	**Strictly Ballroom**	**Angus Strathie**
**1992** (34th)	Black Robe	Renée April and John Hay
**1992** (34th)	Love in Limbo	Clarissa Patterson
**1992** (34th)	Romper Stomper	Anna Borghesi
**1993** (35th)
**1993** (35th)	**The Piano**	**Janet Patterson**
**1993** (35th)	Frauds	Fiona Spence
**1993** (35th)	Gross Misconduct	Aphrodite Kondos
**1993** (35th)	The Nostradamus Kid	Roger Ford
**1993** (35th)	Say a Little Prayer	Lynn-Maree Milburn and Jacqui Everitt
**1994** (36th)
**1994** (36th)	**The Adventures of Priscilla, Queen of the Desert**	**Lizzy Gardiner and Tim Chappel**
**1994** (36th)	Body Melt	Anna Borghesi
**1994** (36th)	Country Life	Wendy Chuck
**1994** (36th)	Muriel's Wedding	Terry Ryan
**1995** (37th)
**1995** (37th)	**Billy's Holiday**	**Terry Ryan**
**1995** (37th)	Metal Skin	Anna Borghesi
**1995** (37th)	Mushrooms	George Liddle
**1995** (37th)	That Eye, the Sky	Vicki Friedman
**1996** (38th)
**1996** (38th)	**Children of the Revolution**	**Terry Ryan**
**1996** (38th)	Love Serenade	Anna Borghesi
**1996** (38th)	Mr. Reliable	Tess Schofield
**1996** (38th)	Shine	Louise Wakefield
**1997** (39th)
**1997** (39th)	**Doing Time for Patsy Cline**	**Louise Wakefield**
**1997** (39th)	Kiss or Kill	Ruth De la Lande
**1997** (39th)	Thank God He Met Lizzie	Edie Kurzer
**1997** (39th)	The Well	Anna Borghesi
**1998** (40th)
**1998** (40th)	**Oscar and Lucinda**	**Janet Patterson**
**1998** (40th)	The Boys	Annie Marshall
**1998** (40th)	Head On	Anna Borghesi
**1998** (40th)	The Sound of One Hand Clapping	Aphrodite Kondos
**1999** (41st)
**1999** (41st)	**Passion**	**Terry Ryan**
**1999** (41st)	In a Savage Land	Edie Kurzer
**1999** (41st)	Praise	Emily Seresin
**1999** (41st)	Two Hands	Emily Seresin
**2000s**
**2000** (42nd)
**2000** (42nd)	**Bootmen**	**Tess Schofield**
**2000** (42nd)	15 Amore	Emma Hamilton Lewis
**2000** (42nd)	Walk the Talk	Louise Wakefield
**2000** (42nd)	The Wog Boy	Paul Warren
**2001** (43rd)
**2001** (43rd)	**Moulin Rouge!**	**Catherine Martin and Angus Strathie**
**2001** (43rd)	The Bank	Annie Marshall
**2001** (43rd)	Lantana	Margot Wilson
**2001** (43rd)	La Spagnola	Margot Wilson
**2002** (44th)
**2002** (44th)	**Dirty Deeds**	**Tess Schofield**
**2002** (44th)	Rabbit-Proof Fence	Roger Ford
**2002** (44th)	Swimming Upstream	Angus Strathie
**2002** (44th)	WillFull	George Liddle
**2003** (45th)
**2003** (45th)	**Ned Kelly**	**Anna Borghesi**
**2003** (45th)	Black and White	Annie Marshall
**2003** (45th)	Gettin' Square	Jackline Sassine
**2003** (45th)	The Night We Called It a Day	Emily Seresin
**2004** (46th)
**2004** (46th)	**Somersault**	**Emily Seresin**
**2004** (46th)	Love's Brother	Anna Borghesi
**2004** (46th)	One Perfect Day	Katie Graham
**2004** (46th)	Tom White	Jill Johanson
**2005** (47th)
**2005** (47th)	**The Proposition**	**Margot Wilson**
**2005** (47th)	Hating Alison Ashley	Paul Warren
**2005** (47th)	Little Fish	Melinda Doring
**2005** (47th)	Look Both Ways	Edie Kurzer
**2006** (48th)
**2006** (48th)	**Macbeth**	**Jane Johnston**
**2006** (48th)	The Book of Revelation	Anna Borghesi
**2006** (48th)	Kokoda	Phill Eagles
**2006** (48th)	Suburban Mayhem	Melinda Doring
**2007** (49th)
**2007** (49th)	**The Home Song Stories**	**Cappi Ireland**
**2007** (49th)	Clubland	Emily Seresin
**2007** (49th)	Razzle Dazzle: A Journey into Dance	Ariane Weiss
**2007** (49th)	Romulus, My Father	Jodie Fried
**2008** (50th)
**2008** (50th)	**The Tender Hook**	**Cappi Ireland**
**2008** (50th)	The Children of Huang Shi	Wenyan Gao and Kym Barrett
**2008** (50th)	Death Defying Acts	Susannah Buxton
**2008** (50th)	Hey, Hey, It's Esther Blueburger	Shareen Beringer
**2009** (51st)
**2009** (51st)	**Australia**	**Catherine Martin and Eliza Godman**
**2009** (51st)	Balibo	Cappi Ireland
**2009** (51st)	Lucky Country	Mariot Kerr
**2009** (51st)	Mao's Last Dancer	Anna Borghesi
**2010s**
**2010** (52nd)
**2010** (52nd)	**Bright Star**	**Janet Patterson**
**2010** (52nd)	Animal Kingdom	Cappi Ireland
**2010** (52nd)	Beneath Hill 60	Ian Sparke and Wendy Cork
**2010** (52nd)	Bran Nue Dae	Margot Wilson
**AACTA Awards**
**2011** (1st)
**2011** (1st)	**The Eye of the Storm**	**Terry Ryan**
**2011** (1st)	The Hunter	Emily Seresin
**2011** (1st)	Oranges and Sunshine	Cappi Ireland
**2011** (1st)	Sleeping Beauty	Shareen Beringer
**2012** (2nd)
**2012** (2nd)	**The Sapphires**	**Tess Schofield**
**2012** (2nd)	Burning Man	Lizzy Gardiner
**2012** (2nd)	Lore	Stefanie Bieker
**2012** (2nd)	Mental	Tim Chappel
**2013** (3rd)
**2013** (3rd)	**The Great Gatsby**	**Catherine Martin, Silvana Azzi Heras and Kerry Thompson**
**2013** (3rd)	Adoration	Joanna Mae Park
**2013** (3rd)	Goddess	Shareen Beringer
**2013** (3rd)	The Rocket	Woranun Pueakpun and Sylvia Wilczynski
**2014** (4th)
**2014** (4th)	**The Water Diviner**	**Tess Schofield**
**2014** (4th)	Predestination	Wendy Cork
**2014** (4th)	The Railway Man	Lizzy Gardiner
**2014** (4th)	Tracks	Mariot Kerr
**2015** (5th)
**2015** (5th)	**The Dressmaker**	**Marion Boyce and Margot Wilson**
**2015** (5th)	Cut Snake	Cappi Ireland
**2015** (5th)	Mad Max: Fury Road	Jenny Beavan
**2015** (5th)	Partisan	Maria Pattison and Sarah Cyngler
**2016** (6th)
**2016** (6th)	**Girl Asleep**	**Jonathon Oxlade**
**2016** (6th)	Gods of Egypt	Liz Palmer
**2016** (6th)	Hacksaw Ridge	Lizzy Gardiner
**2016** (6th)	Spear	Jennifer Irwin
**2017** (7th)
**2017** (7th)	**Lion**	**Cappi Ireland**
**2017** (7th)	Berlin Syndrome	Maria Pattison
**2017** (7th)	Dance Academy: The Movie	Tess Schofield
**2017** (7th)	Jasper Jones	Margot Wilson
**2018** (8th)
**2018** (8th)	**Ladies in Black**	**Wendy Cork**
**2018** (8th)	Mary Magdalene	Jacqueline Durran
**2018** (8th)	Sweet Country	Heather Wallace
**2018** (8th)	Winchester	Wendy Cork
**2019** (9th)
**2019** (9th)	**The King**	**Jane Petrie**
**2019** (9th)	Hotel Mumbai	Anna Borghesi
**2019** (9th)	Judy and Punch	Edie Kurzer
**2019** (9th)	The Nightingale	Margot Wilson
**2020s**
**2020** (10th)
**2020** (10th)	**True History of the Kelly Gang**	**Alice Babidge**
**2020** (10th)	H is for Happiness	Terri Lamera
**2020** (10th)	I Am Woman	Emily Seresin
**2020** (10th)	Measure for Measure	Zohie Castellano and Olivia Simpson
**2020** (10th)	Standing Up for Sunny	Nina Edwards
**2021** (11th)
**2021** (11th)	**High Ground**	**Erin Roche**
**2021** (11th)	The Dry	Cappi Ireland
**2021** (11th)	Mortal Kombat	Cappi Ireland
**2021** (11th)	Nitram	Alice Babidge
**2021** (11th)	Rams	Tess Schofield
**2022** (12th)
**2022** (12th)	**Elvis**	**Catherine Martin**
**2022** (12th)	The Drover's Wife: The Legend of Molly Johnson	Tess Schofield
**2022** (12th)	Here Out West	Wendy Cork
**2022** (12th)	Pieces	Monique Wilson and Kristie Rowe
**2022** (12th)	Three Thousand Years of Longing	Kym Barrett
**2023** (13th)
**2023** (13th)	**Carmen**	**Emily Seresin**
**2023** (13th)	Blueback	Lien See Leong
**2023** (13th)	The New Boy	Heather Wallace
**2023** (13th)	The Rooster	Ellen Stanistreet
**2023** (13th)	Seriously Red	Tim Chappel
**2024** (14th)
**2024** (14th)	**Furiosa: A Mad Max Saga**	**Jenny Beavan**
**2024** (14th)	Better Man	Cappi Ireland
**2024** (14th)	How to Make Gravy	Christina Validakis
**2024** (14th)	Late Night with the Devil	Steph Hooke
**2024** (14th)	Runt	Terri Lamera

== Notes ==
A: From 1958-2010, the awards were held during the year of the films release. However, from 2012, onwards, awards are handed out for films of the previous year.
