= 1979 Australian Film Institute Awards =

Australian film awards ceremony in 1979

- Date: Wednesday, 18 September 1979
- Site: Regent Theatre; Sydney, New South Wales
- Hosted by: Graham Kennedy

Television coverage
- Network: ABC

The 21st Australian Film Institute Awards ceremony, presented by the Australian Film Institute (AFI), honored the best Australian feature films of 1979.

== Winners and nominees ==
Winners are listed first and marked in a separate colour, in boldface.

Category	Winners
Best Film	**My Brilliant Career – Margaret Fink**
Best Film	Cathy's Child – Tom Oliver, Errol Sullivan
Best Film	In Search of Anna – Esben Storm
Best Film	Mad Max – Byron Kennedy
Best Actor	**Mel Gibson – Tim**
Best Actor	Alan Cassell – Cathy's Child
Best Actor	Richard Moir – In Search of Anna
Best Actor	Michael Preston – The Last of the Knucklemen
Best Actress	**Michelle Fawdon – Cathy's Child**
Best Actress	Judy Davis – My Brilliant Career
Best Actress	Sigrid Thornton – Snapshot
Best Actress	Ruth Cracknell – The Night the Prowler
Best Supporting Actor	**Alwyn Kurts – Tim**
Best Supporting Actor	Hugh Keays-Byrne – Mad Max
Best Supporting Actor	Robert Grubb – My Brilliant Career
Best Supporting Actor	Michael Duffield – The Last of the Knucklemen
Best Supporting Actress	**Pat Evison – Tim**
Best Supporting Actress	Aileen Britton – My Brilliant Career
Best Supporting Actress	Patricia Kennedy – My Brilliant Career
Best Supporting Actress	Wendy Hughes – My Brilliant Career
Best Original Screenplay	**In Search of Anna – Esben Storm**
Best Original Screenplay	Kostas – Linda Aronson
Best Original Screenplay	Mad Max – James McCausland, George Miller
Best Original Screenplay	Palm Beach – Albie Thoms
Best Screenplay Adapted From Other Material	**My Brilliant Career – Eleanor Witcombe**
Best Screenplay Adapted From Other Material	Cathy's Child – Ken Quinnell
Best Screenplay Adapted From Other Material	The Last of the Knucklemen – Tim Burstall
Best Screenplay Adapted From Other Material	Money Movers – Bruce Beresford
Best Cinematography	**My Brilliant Career – Donald McAlpine**
Best Cinematography	Mad Max – David Eggby
Best Cinematography	In Search of Anna – Michael Edols
Best Cinematography	Snapshot – Vincent Monton
Best Editing	**Mad Max – Tony Paterson, Clifford Hayes**
Best Editing	Money Movers – William M. Anderson
Best Editing	My Brilliant Career – Nicholas Beauman
Best Editing	The Odd Angry Shot – Brian Kavanagh
Best Original Music Score	**Mad Max – Brian May**
Best Original Music Score	The Night the Prowler – Cameron Allan
Best Original Music Score	In Search of Anna – John Martyn
Best Original Music Score	The Last of the Knucklemen – Bruce Smeaton
Best Costume Design	**My Brilliant Career – Anna Senior**
Best Costume Design	Mad Max – Clare Griffin
Best Costume Design	The Night the Prowler – Luciana Arrighi
Best Costume Design	The Last of the Knucklemen – Kevin Regan
