= Anna Senior =

Australian costume designer (born 1941)

Anna Senior OAM
- Born: 1941 (age 84–85); Canberra, Australian Capital Territory, Australia
- Other name: Anne Senior
- Occupation: Costume designer
- Years active: 1969–2008

Anna Senior OAM (born 1941) is an Australian retired costume designer. Her accolades include two AACTA Awards, in addition to a nomination for an Academy Award.

== Selected filmography ==
=== Film ===
Year	Title	Director	Notes
1977	The Getting of Wisdom	Bruce Beresford	
1978	Weekend of Shadows	Tom Jeffrey	
1978	The Night the Prowler	Jim Sharman	
1978	Money Movers	Bruce Beresford	
1979	The Odd Angry Shot	Tom Jeffrey	
1979	My Brilliant Career	Gillian Armstrong	
1979	The Journalist	Michael Thornhill	
1980	Breaker Morant	Bruce Beresford	Wardrobe designer
1980	Maybe This Time	Chris McGill	
1983	Phar Lap	Simon Wincer	
1985	Robbery Under Arms	Donald Crombie; Ken Hannam	Also released in a longer television version
1987	Les Patterson Saves the World	George T. Miller	
1998	Hurrah	Frank Shields	

=== Television ===
Year	Title	Notes
1982	Sara Dane	8 episodes
1983	For the Term of His Natural Life	3 episodes
1983	Under Capricorn	2 episodes
1984	The Fire in the Stone	Television film
1985	Archer	Television film
1986–1987	The Challenge	Unknown episodes
1988	The First Kangaroos	Television film
1988	Dadah Is Death	Television film
1990	Flair	2 episodes
1990	Jackaroo	2 episodes
1992	The Other Side of Paradise	4 episodes

== Awards and nominations ==
Award	Year (Note: Indicates the year of ceremony. Each year is linked to the article about the awards held that year, wherever possible.)	Category	Work	Result	Ref.
AACTA Awards	1978	Best Achievement in Costume Design	The Getting of Wisdom	Nominated	
AACTA Awards	1979	Best Achievement in Costume Design	My Brilliant Career	Won	
AACTA Awards	1980	Best Achievement in Costume Design	Breaker Morant	Won	
AACTA Awards	1983	Best Achievement in Costume Design	Phar Lap	Nominated	
Academy Awards	1981	Best Costume Design	My Brilliant Career	Nominated	

== Other honours ==
- Senior was awarded the Medal of the Order of Australia (OAM) in the 2022 Queen's Birthday Honours for service to the visual arts through costume design.
