= AACTA Award for Best Production Design =

Australian film award

- Country: Australia
- Presented by: Australian Academy of Cinema and Television Arts (AACTA)
- First award: 1976
- Currently held by: Colin Gibson and Katie Sharrock, Furiosa: A Mad Max Saga (2024)
- Website: http://www.aacta.org

The AACTA Award for Best Production Design is an accolade given by the Australian Academy of Cinema and Television Arts (AACTA), a non-profit organisation whose aim is to "identify, award, promote and celebrate Australia's greatest achievements in film and television." The award is handed out at the annual AACTA Awards, which rewards achievements in feature film, television, documentaries and short films. From 1976 to 2010, the category was presented by the Australian Film Institute (AFI), the academy's parent organisation, at the annual Australian Film Institute Awards (known as the AFI Awards). When the AFI launched the academy in 2011, it changed the annual ceremony to the AACTA Awards, with the current award being a continuum of the AFI Award for Best Production Design.

Best Production Design was first presented as Best Art Direction in 1977. The name changed to its current one in 1983. The award is presented to the production designer of a film that is Australian-made, or with a significant amount of Australian content.

== Winners and nominees ==
In the following table, the years listed correspond to the year of film release; the ceremonies are usually held the same year.^{[A]} The films and production designers in bold and in yellow background have won are the winners. Those that are neither highlighted nor in bold are the nominees. When sorted chronologically, the table always lists the winning film first and then the other nominees.

Winner

Year	Film	Production designer(s)
**AFI Awards**
**1977**	**The Picture Show Man**	**David Copping**
**1977**	Break of Day	Wendy Dickson
**1977**	Oz	Robbie Perkins
**1977**	Storm Boy	David Copping
**1978**	**Newsfront**	**Lissa Coote**
**1978**	The Chant of Jimmie Blacksmith	Wendy Dickson
**1978**	The Getting of Wisdom	John Stoddart and Richard D. Kent
**1978**	The Mango Tree	Leslie Binns
**1979**	**My Brilliant Career**	**Luciana Arrighi**
**1979**	The Last Of The Knucklemen	Leslie Binns
**1979**	Mad Max	Jon Dowding
**1979**	Money Movers	David Copping
**1980s**
**1980**	**Breaker Morant**	**David Copping**
**1980**	The Chain Reaction	Graham 'Grace' Walker
**1980**	Harlequin	Bernard Hides
**1980**	Stir	Lee Whitmore
**1981**	**Gallipoli**	**Herbert Pinter and Wendy Stites**
**1981**	Fatty Finn	Lissa Coote
**1981**	Grendel Grendel Grendel	Alex Stitt
**1981**	The Survivor	Bernard Hides
**1981**	Winter of Our Dreams	Lee Whitmore
**1982**	**Mad Max 2**	**Graham 'Grace' Walker**
**1982**	The Return of Captain Invincible	David Copping
**1982**	Squizzy Taylor	Logan Brewer
**1982**	Starstruck	Brian Thomson
**1983**	**Careful, He Might Hear You**	**John Stoddart**
**1983**	Undercover	Herbert Pinter
**1983**	The Wild Duck	Darrell Lass
**1983**	The Year of Living Dangerously	Herbert Pinter and Wendy Stites
**1984**	**Strikebound**	**Tracy Watt, Harry Zettel, MacGregor Knox and Neil Angwin**
**1984**	Razorback	Bryce Walmsley
**1984**	Silver City	Igor Nay
**1984**	Street Hero	Brian Thomson
**1985**	**Rebel**	**Brian Thomson**
**1985**	Bliss	Owen Paterson and Wendy Dickson
**1985**	The Coca-Cola Kid	Graham 'Grace' Walker
**1985**	Frog Dreaming	Jon Dowding
**1986**	**Playing Beatie Bow**	**George Liddle**
**1986**	Dead End Drive-In	Lawrence Eastwood
**1986**	For Love Alone	John Stoddart
**1986**	The Right-Hand Man	Neil Angwin
**1987**	**Ground Zero**	**Brian Thomson**
**1987**	Bullseye	George Liddle
**1987**	The Place at the Coast	Owen Paterson
**1987**	To Market To Market	Virginia Rouse
**1988**	**The Navigator: A Medieval Odyssey**	**Sally Campbell**
**1988**	Dangerous Game	Igor Nay
**1988**	Incident at Raven's Gate	Judith Russell
**1988**	Spirits of the Air, Gremlins of the Clouds	Sean Callinan
**1989**	**Ghosts... of the Civil Dead**	**Chris Kennedy**
**1989**	Dead Calm	Graham 'Grace' Walker
**1989**	Georgia	Jon Dowding
**1989**	Island	Neil Angwin
**1990s**
**1990**	**Flirting**	**Roger Ford**
**1990**	The Big Steal	Paddy Reardon
**1990**	Blood Oath	Bernard Hides
**1990**	Weekend with Kate	Lawrence Eastwood
**1991**	**Spotswood**	**Chris Kennedy**
**1991**	Aya	Jennie Tate
**1991**	Deadly	Peta Lawson
**1991**	Isabelle Eberhardt	Bryce Perrin and Geoffroy Larcher
**1992**	**Strictly Ballroom**	**Catherine Martin**
**1992**	The Last Days of Chez Nous	Janet Patterson
**1992**	Love in Limbo	David McKay
**1992**	Romper Stomper	Steven Jones-Evans
**1993**	**The Piano**	**Andrew McAlpine**
**1993**	Broken Highway	Lesley Crawford
**1993**	Resistance	MacGregor Knox
**1993**	Say a Little Prayer	Chris Kennedy
**1994**	**The Adventures of Priscilla, Queen of the Desert**	**Owen Paterson**
**1994**	Gino	Chris Kennedy
**1994**	Muriel's Wedding	Paddy Reardon
**1994**	Traps	Michael Philips
**1995**	**Metal Skin**	**Steven Jones-Evans**
**1995**	All Men Are Liars	Murray Pope
**1995**	Mushrooms	George Liddle
**1995**	That Eye, the Sky	Chris Kennedy
**1996**	**Children of the Revolution**	**Roger Ford**
**1996**	Love Serenade	Steven Jones-Evans
**1996**	Shine	Vicki Niehus
**1996**	To Have & to Hold	Chris Kennedy
**1997**	**The Well**	**Michael Philips**
**1997**	Doing Time for Patsy Cline	Roger Ford
**1997**	Idiot Box	Kerith Holmes
**1997**	Thank God He Met Lizzie	Clarissa Patterson
**1998**	**Oscar and Lucinda**	**Luciana Arrighi**
**1998**	Dead Letter Office	Chris Kennedy
**1998**	The Interview	Richard Bell
**1998**	Radiance	Sarah Stollman
**1999**	**Passion**	**Murray Picknett**
**1999**	In a Savage Land	Nicholas McCallum
**1999**	Praise	Michael Philips
**1999**	Siam Sunset	Steven Jones-Evans
**2000s**
**2000**	**Bootmen**	**Murray Picknett**
**2000**	Better Than Sex	Tara Kamath
**2000**	Chopper	Paddy Reardon
**2000**	Looking for Alibrandi	Stephen Curtis
**2001**	**Moulin Rouge!**	**Catherine Martin**
**2001**	The Bank	Luigi Pittorino
**2001**	Lantana	Kim Buddee
**2001**	La Spagnola	Dee Molineaux
**2002**	**Dirty Deeds**	**Chris Kennedy**
**2002**	Garage Days	Michael Philips
**2002**	Rabbit-Proof Fence	Roger Ford
**2002**	Swimming Upstream	Roger Ford
**2003**	**Ned Kelly**	**Steven Jones-Evans**
**2003**	Gettin' Square	Nicholas McCallum
**2003**	Japanese Story	Paddy Reardon
**2003**	The Night We Called It a Day	Michael Philips
**2004**	**Somersault**	**Melinda Doring**
**2004**	Love's Brother	Paul Heath
**2004**	One Perfect Day	MacGregor Knox, Patrick Bennet and Joseph Keily
**2004**	Tom White	Dan Potra
**2005**	**The Proposition**	**Chris Kennedy**
**2005**	Little Fish	Luigi Pittorino
**2005**	Look Both Ways	Rita Zanchetta
**2005**	Three Dollars	Luigi Pittorino
**2006**	**Macbeth**	**David McKay**
**2006**	Candy	Robert Cousins
**2006**	Suburban Mayhem	Nell Hanson
**2006**	Ten Canoes	Beverley Freeman
**2007**	**The Home Song Stories**	**Melinda Doring**
**2007**	Clubland	Nell Hanson
**2007**	Noise	Paddy Reardon
**2007**	Romulus, My Father	Robert Cousins
**2008**	**Death Defying Acts**	**Gemma Jackson**
**2008**	The Children of Huang Shi	Steven Jones-Evans
**2008**	The Tender Hook	Pete Baxter
**2008**	Unfinished Sky	Laurie Faen
**2009**	**Australia**	**Catherine Martin, Ian Gracie, Karen Murphy and Beverley Dunn**
**2009**	Balibo	Robert Cousins
**2009**	Mao's Last Dancer	Herbert Pinter
**2009**	Mary and Max	Adam Elliot
**2010s**
**2010**	**Bright Star**	**Janet Patterson**
**2010**	Animal Kingdom	Josephine Ford
**2010**	Beneath Hill 60	Clayton Jauncey
**2010**	Tomorrow, When the War Began	Robert Webb, Michelle McGahey, Damien Drew and Beverley Dunn
**AACTA Awards**
**2011** (1st)	**The Eye of the Storm**	**Melinda Doring**
**2011** (1st)	The Hunter	Steven Jones-Evans
**2011** (1st)	Red Dog	Ian Gracie
**2011** (1st)	Sleeping Beauty	Annie Beauchamp
**2012** (2nd)	**The Sapphires**	**Melinda Doring**
**2012** (2nd)	Burning Man	Steven Jones-Evans
**2012** (2nd)	Killer Elite	Michelle McGahey
**2012** (2nd)	Lore	Silke Fischer
**2013** (3rd)	**The Great Gatsby**	**Catherine Martin, Ian Gracie, Karen Murphy and Beverley Dunn**
**2013** (3rd)	Adoration	Annie Beauchamp
**2013** (3rd)	Goddess	Annie Beauchamp
**2013** (3rd)	The Rocket	Pete Baxter
**2014** (4th)	**Predestination**	**Matthew Putland**
**2014** (4th)	The Babadook	Alex Holmes
**2014** (4th)	The Rover	Josephine Ford
**2014** (4th)	The Water Diviner	Chris Kennedy
**2015** (5th)	**Mad Max: Fury Road**	**Colin Gibson**
**2015** (5th)	Cut Snake	Josephine Ford
**2015** (5th)	The Dressmaker	Roger Ford
**2015** (5th)	Partisan	Steven Jones-Evans and Sarah Cyngler
**2016** (6th)	**Hacksaw Ridge**	**Barry Robison**
**2016** (6th)	The Daughter	Steven Jones-Evans
**2016** (6th)	Girl Asleep	Jonathon Oxlade
**2016** (6th)	Goldstone	Matt Putland
**2017** (7th)	**Lion**	**Chris Kennedy**
**2017** (7th)	Berlin Syndrome	Melinda Doring
**2017** (7th)	The Death and Life of Otto Bloom	Ben Morieson
**2017** (7th)	Jasper Jones	Herbert Pinter
**2018** (8th)	**Peter Rabbit**	**Roger Ford and Lisa Thompson**
**2018** (8th)	Cargo	Jo Ford
**2018** (8th)	Upgrade	Felicity Abbott and Katie Sharrock
**2018** (8th)	Winchester	Vanessa Cerne and Matthew Putland
**2019** (9th)	**The King**	**Fiona Crombie and Alice Felton**
**2019** (9th)	Hotel Mumbai	Steven Jones-Evans
**2019** (9th)	Judy and Punch	Jo Ford
**2019** (9th)	The Nightingale	Alex Holmes
**2020s**
**2020** (10th)	**True History of the Kelly Gang**	**Karen Murphy and Rebecca Cohen**
**2020** (10th)	Babyteeth	Sherree Philips
**2020** (10th)	I Am Woman	Michael Turner and Richie Dehne
**2020** (10th)	The Invisible Man	Alex Holmes and Katie Sharrock
**2020** (10th)	Miss Fisher and the Crypt of Tears	Robert Perkins
**2021** (11th)	**Mortal Kombat**	**Naaman Marshall**
**2021** (11th)	2067	Jacinta Leong
**2021** (11th)	Nitram	Alice Babidge
**2021** (11th)	Penguin Bloom	Annie Beauchamp
**2021** (11th)	Peter Rabbit 2: The Runaway	Roger Ford
**2022** (12th)	**Elvis**	**Catherine Martin, Karen Murphy and Beverley Dunn**
**2022** (12th)	The Drover's Wife: The Legend of Molly Johnson	Sam Hobbs
**2022** (12th)	Interceptor	George Liddle
**2022** (12th)	The Stranger	Leah Popple
**2022** (12th)	Three Thousand Years of Longing	Roger Ford
**2023** (13th)	**The New Boy**	**Amy Baker**
**2023** (13th)	Carmen	Steven Jones-Evans
**2023** (13th)	The Portable Door	Matthew Putland
**2023** (13th)	Scarygirl	Nathan Jurevicius
**2023** (13th)	True Spirit	Michelle McGahey, Bill Booth and Gillian Butler
**2024** (14th)	**Furiosa: A Mad Max Saga**	**Colin Gibson and Katie Sharrock**
**2024** (14th)	Better Man	Joel Chang and Lisa Brennan
**2024** (14th)	How to Make Gravy	Benjamin Fountain and Peter Kodicek
**2024** (14th)	Late Night with the Devil	Otello Stolfo
**2024** (14th)	Memoir of a Snail	Adam Elliot

== Notes ==
A: From 1958-2010, the awards were held during the year of the films release. However, from 2012, onwards, awards are handed out for films of the previous year.
