= Luciana Arrighi =

Italian-Australian production designer

- Born: 1940 (age 85–86); Rio de Janeiro, Brazil
- Citizenship: Australia; Italy
- Occupation: Production designer
- Years active: 1965–present
- Spouse: Rupert Chetwynd (m. 1970; died 2021)
- Children: 2; including Monster Chetwynd

Luciana Maria Arrighi AM (born 1940) is an Australian and Italian (Note: Arrighi was born in Brazil but said she holds only Italian and Australian citizenship. According to Brazilian nationality law, any person born in Brazil acquires Brazilian nationality at birth regardless of their parents' nationality, unless they are in the service of another country at the time of birth.) production designer. In 1993, she won an Oscar for Best Art Direction for the film Howards End (1992). She also earned two more Oscar nominations in the same category for The Remains of the Day (1993) in 1994, and Anna and the King (1999) in 2000. In 2003, she won the BAFTA Award for Best Art Direction for the television film The Gathering Storm (2002).

== Career ==
Luciana Arrighi was born in Rio de Janeiro, Brazil in 1940, daughter of Italian diplomat and former journalist Count Ernesto Arrighi, and Australian Eleanor ("Nellie"), daughter of grazier Douglas Cox. Nellie had been a showgirl with J.C. Williamson Ltd, and later a model for Schiaparelli in Paris, and was distantly related by marriage to the novelist Patrick White (her paternal grandfather's sister was married to Patrick White's great-uncle); over the course of their long friendship they claimed "cousinhood". Ernesto Arrighi was appointed consul at Melbourne in 1937, and met Nellie on a visit to Sydney. They married in 1939, and Ernesto was posted to Rio de Janeiro, where Luciana, their first child, was born. The family returned to Rome in 1943 before going to Nice on the French Riviera, and after the surrender of Italy to the Allies Ernesto was imprisoned by the Germans for "high treason" in 1943. On his release, he was given a diplomatic posting to Sydney, his wife and two daughters going ahead of him, but he died suddenly before being able to join them.

Arrighi left Brazil with her parents when she was two years old and was raised and educated in Australia, studying at East Sydney Technical College (now the National Art School). She went to the United Kingdom, where she worked for the BBC; she was spotted by Ken Russell, who used her talents in some of his early films such as Isadora Duncan, the Biggest Dancer in the World (1966) and Women in Love (1969).

She went on to study painting in Italy and she has also worked in costume design in theatre and opera, including with Vienna State Opera, Opera Australia and The Royal Opera, Covent Garden. She lived in Paris for two years and was a model for French fashion designer Yves Saint Laurent.

In 1993, Arrighi received the Silver Ribbon for Best Production Design Award and the Oscar for Best Art Direction for the film Howards End directed by James Ivory. She was also nominated for an Oscar for Best Art Direction for the film The Remains of the Day (1993), also by James Ivory, and Anna and the King (1999) by Andy Tennant. She won the British BAFTA Award for Best Art Direction for the television film The Gathering Storm (2002), directed by Richard Loncraine.

== Personal life ==
In 1970, Arrighi married Captain Rupert Milo Talbot Chetwynd (1934–2021), of the Grenadier Guards and 21st SAS Regiment, later an adventurer and founder of a medical mission to Afghanistan. He was a descendant of the 6th Viscount Chetwynd. They had a son, Aaron, and daughter, Alalia, the artist Monster Chetwynd. Arrighi splits her time between London and France.

Her French-born sister Niké Arrighi (1944–2025) was a visual artist and actress.

== Filmography ==
=== Production design ===
Scenographer:

- Monitor (1965), director David Jones, 1 episode
- Isadora Duncan, the Biggest Dancer in the World (1966), TV, director Ken Russell
- Omnibus (1967), 1 episode
- Sunday Bloody Sunday (1971), director John Schlesinger
- The Night the Prowler (1978), director Jim Sharman
- My Brilliant Career (1979), director Gillian Armstrong
- The Return of the Soldier (1982), director Alan Bridges
- Privates on Parade (1983), director Michael Blakemore
- The Ploughman's Lunch (1983), director Richard Eyre
- Mrs. Soffel (1984), director Gillian Armstrong
- Madame Sousatzka (1988), director John Schlesinger
- The Rainbow (1989), director Ken Russell
- Bye Bye Columbus (1991), TV, director Peter Barnes
- Close My Eyes (1991), director Stephen Poliakoff
- Howards End (1992), director James Ivory
- The Innocent (1993), director John Schlesinger
- The Remains of the Day (1993), director James Ivory
- Only You (1994), director Norman Jewison
- Sense of Sensibility (1995), director Ang Lee
- Surviving Picasso (1996), director James Ivory
- Victory (1996), director Mark Peploe
- Oscar and Lucinda (1997), director Gillian Armstrong
- A Midsummer Night's Dream (1999), director Michael Hoffman
- Jakob the Liar (1999), director Peter Kassovitz
- Anna and the King (1999), director Andy Tennant
- The Gathering Storm (2002), TV, director Richard Loncraine
- The Importance of Being Ernest (2002), director Oliver Parker
- Possession (2002), director Neil LaBute
- My House in Umbria (2003), TV, director Richard Loncraine
- Being Julia (2004), director István Szabó
- Fade to Black (2006), director Oliver Parker
- Into the Storm (2009), TV, director Thaddeus O'Sullivan
- From Time to Time (2009), director Julian Fellowes
- Singularity (2013), director Roland Joffé
- Angelica (2015), director Mitchell Lichtenstein

=== Costume design ===
- Starstruck (2010 film) (1982)
- Privates on Parade (1983)
- The Ploughman's Lunch (1983)
- Un ballo in maschera (1989), TV

=== Set and production design ===
- Women in Love (1969), director Ken Russell

== Awards and nominations ==
Award	Year	Category	Nominated work	Result	Ref.
Academy Awards	1993	Best Art Direction	Howards End	Won	
Academy Awards	1994	Best Art Direction	The Remains of the Day	Nominated	
Academy Awards	2000	Best Art Direction	Anna and the King	Nominated	
Art Directors Guild Awards	2000	Excellence in Production Design for a Feature Film	Anna and the King	Nominated	
Australian Film Institute Awards	1979	Best Achievement in Production Design	My Brilliant Career	Won	
Australian Film Institute Awards	1982	Best Achievement in Costume Design	Starstruck	Nominated	
Australian Film Institute Awards	1998	Best Achievement in Production Design	Oscar and Lucinda	Won	
British Academy Film Awards	1970	Best Art Direction	Women in Love	Nominated	
British Academy Film Awards	1993	Best Production Design	Howards End	Nominated	
British Academy Film Awards	1996	Best Production Design	Sense and Sensibility	Nominated	
British Academy Television Craft Awards	2003	Best Production Design	The Gathering Storm	Won	
Italian National Syndicate of Film Journalists	1993	Best Production Design	Howards End	Won	
Italian National Syndicate of Film Journalists	2000	Best Production Design	Anna and the King	Nominated	
Online Film & Television Association	1999	Best Production Design	Anna and the King	Nominated	
Primetime Emmy Awards	2003	Outstanding Art Direction for a Miniseries, Movie or a Special	My House in Umbria	Nominated	
Primetime Emmy Awards	2009	Outstanding Art Direction for a Miniseries, Movie or a Special	Into the Storm	Nominated	
Satellite Awards	2000	Best Art Direction and Production Design	Anna and the King	Nominated	
Online Film & Television Association	1999	Best Production Design	Anna and the King	Nominated	
Women's International Film & Television Showcase	2016	Lifetime Achievement Award	Luciana Arrighi	Won	
