= Winchester (film) =

2018 film by Michael and Peter Spierig

- Theatrical release poster
- Directed by: The Spierig Brothers
- Screenplay by: Tom Vaughan; The Spierig Brothers
- Produced by: Tim McGahan; Brett Tomberlin
- Starring: Helen Mirren; Jason Clarke; Sarah Snook
- Cinematography: Ben Nott
- Edited by: Matt Villa
- Music by: Peter Spierig
- Production companies: Blacklab Entertainment; Imagination Design Works; CBS Films
- Distributed by: Lionsgate (United States and United Kingdom); StudioCanal (Australia and New Zealand)
- Release dates: February 2, 2018 (United States); February 22, 2018 (Australia)
- Running time: 99 minutes
- Countries: Australia; United States
- Language: English
- Budget: $3.5 million
- Box office: $44 million

Winchester (also known as Winchester: The House That Ghosts Built) is a 2018 biographical supernatural horror film directed by Michael and Peter Spierig, and written by the Spierigs and Tom Vaughan. The film stars Helen Mirren as heiress Sarah Winchester, with Jason Clarke and Sarah Snook, and follows Winchester as she is haunted by spirits inside her San Jose mansion in 1906.

An American-Australian co-production, the film was released in the United States on February 2, 2018, and in Australia on February 22, 2018. The film received negative reviews from critics, who called it "dull" and "pointless”, but was a box office success, grossing $44 million worldwide against a $3.5 million budget. At the 39th Golden Raspberry Awards, the film was nominated in four categories, including Worst Picture and Worst Actress for Mirren, but did not win any of them.

== Plot ==
Sarah Winchester is the widow of famed gun manufacturer William Wirt Winchester. Her husband's sudden death and the previous death of their child Annie have left her in grief and convinced she is cursed by the ghosts of those who died at the hands of Winchester firearms.

After seeking advice from a medium, she spent her twenty million dollars inheritance to build an enormous, seemingly never-ending mansion in San Jose, California that would eventually be named the Winchester Mystery House. The house is under constant construction and Sarah's niece Marion Marriott lives in the house with her son Henry. At night, Henry is possessed by a mysterious entity.

In 1906, the Winchester company hires Doctor Eric Price to stay at the house and assess Sarah, believing she is mentally unfit to remain in charge of the company. Still grieving the death of his wife Ruby, Eric is reliant on drugs. He arrives at the house and has a ghostly vision that he believes is the drugs' side-effect. Later, he spots a ghost in the basement. Witnessing a possessed Henry jump off the roof, Eric saves him.

The next day, Eric begins to conduct his assessment of Sarah's mental well-being. Sarah admits her fear of ghosts and believes she can help them move on. She reveals that she knows about Eric's drug problem and confiscates his supply of laudanum. That night, Eric witnesses a seemingly possessed Sarah draw a plan for a new room. He is startled by an entity and flees back to his room. The next day, Sarah shows Eric that she keeps records of people killed by Winchester rifles. It is revealed that Eric had actually been shot and killed by a Winchester rifle before being revived, and he keeps the refurbished bullet with him. Sarah explains how thirteen nails keep spirits sealed in rooms.

A possessed Henry attempts to kill Sarah with a rifle, but is stopped by Eric and Marion. Realizing how violent this spirit is, Sarah sends her staff away and decides to personally remove the ghost from her home. Eric encounters a butler who reveals himself to be a ghost. He and Sarah identify the ghost as Benjamin Block, a Confederate States Army soldier who lost his two brothers in the American Civil War to Winchester rifles. A devastated Ben proceeded to shoot up a Winchester office, massacring the workers before being shot dead by police. Ben has been the one possessing Henry; the constructed room with the Winchester guns is the room where he was shot dead.

A violent earthquake takes place, devastating the house and separating Eric and Sarah. In the chaos, a possessed Henry escapes, pursued by Marion. Eric encounters several ghosts before seeing the ghost of Ruby. It is revealed that Ruby could see and hear ghosts but was misdiagnosed as "delusional" by Eric. Eventually, the unstable Ruby shot Eric before killing herself with a Winchester rifle. Ruby's ghost comforts Eric, inspiring him to help Sarah.

Eric reunites with Sarah and they manage to trap Ben in the room. Marion and Henry are cornered by Ben's brothers. Ben attempts to kill Sarah, but the pair realizes that Ben is scared of the bullet Eric kept. Eric has been able to see the ghosts in the house due to his dying from that bullet beforehand. Eric uses the bullet in the rifle that Ben used in the shooting and banishes him. Henry and Marion are saved and the other spirits return to their rooms.

Eric pronounces Sarah sane, allowing her to remain in control of the company. Sarah announces her intent to build more rooms to help more spirits. As the house is being repaired, the camera returns to view the hall of boarded up rooms and catches a nail falling out of one of the boards that is sealing a spirit in a room.

== Cast ==
- Helen Mirren as Sarah Winchester
- Jason Clarke as Eric Price
- Sarah Snook as Marion Marriott
- Finn Scicluna-O'Prey as Henry Marriott
- Angus Sampson as John Hansen
- Laura Brent as Ruby Price
- Tyler Coppin as Arthur Gates
- Eamon Farren as Corporal Benjamin Block
- Bruce Spence as Augustine

== Production ==
In 2009, it was announced that a film would be made about the Winchester Mystery House. Rights to the story were acquired by the Hammer Films division of Exclusive Media in 2012, with Imagination Design Works and Nine/8 Entertainment producing. Michael and Peter Spierig were set as directors on May 10, 2016, with the pair also revising the script. On May 14, Helen Mirren began finalizing a deal to star in the film as heiress Sarah Winchester, and filming was expected to start later in 2016, in San Jose, California and Australia. In August 2016, CBS Films acquired distribution rights to the film, and production was pushed back to March 2017. In September 2016, Jason Clarke entered negotiations to star in the film. Sarah Snook and Angus Sampson joined the cast in March 2017, and filming commenced in Australia. The film was originally to be released on February 23, 2018, but the release date was moved up to February 2, 2018.

== Reception ==
=== Box office ===
Winchester grossed $25.1 million in the United States and Canada, and $20.9 million in other territories, for a worldwide total of $46 million, against a production budget of $3.5 million.

In the United States and Canada, Winchester was released on February 2, 2018, and was expected to gross $6–8 million from 2,480 theaters in its opening weekend. It ended up debuting to $9.3 million, finishing third at the box office, behind holdovers Jumanji: Welcome to the Jungle and Maze Runner: The Death Cure.

=== Critical response ===
On review aggregator website Rotten Tomatoes, the film holds a "Rotten" 12% rating based on 129 reviews, with an average rating of 3.9/10. The website's critical consensus reads, "Like a grand staircase within the famous mansion that inspired it, Winchester appears poised to get a rise out of audiences, but ultimately leads nowhere." At Metacritic, the film received a weighted average score of 28 out of 100, based on 18 critics, indicating "generally unfavorable reviews". Audiences polled by CinemaScore gave the film an average grade of "B−" on an A+ to F scale.

Variety's Owen Gleiberman gave the film a negative review, writing, "Mirren does all she can to look like she’s having fun, but Winchester...[is] an empty grab bag of a spook show in which the Spierig brothers never do figure out a way to turn the Winchester Mystery House into an exhilarating movie set."

Stephen Dalton of The Hollywood Reporter gave the film a mixed review, saying that "Winchester is a visual treat, its palette aglow with bronze and turquoise tints that suggest colorized Victorian postcards," but it "promises more sophisticated shocks and psychological depths than it ultimately delivers."

Simon Abrams of RogerEbert.com gave the film three out of four stars, stating, "Winchester leveled my unfair expectations simply by being both silly and fun... what [it] lacks in originality its creators amply make up for in execution." He also stated that the dialogue was "enjoyable."

In January 2019, it was nominated for several Razzie Awards, including Worst Picture and Worst Actress.

=== Accolades ===
Award	Ceremony date	Category	Subject	Result	Ref(s)
AACTA Awards	3 December 2018	Best Production Design	Vanessa Cerne & Matthew Putland	Nominated	
AACTA Awards	3 December 2018	Best Costume Design	Wendy Cork	Nominated	
AACTA Awards	3 December 2018	Best Hair and Makeup	Steve Boyle & Tess Natoli	Nominated	
Golden Raspberry Awards	February 23, 2019	Worst Picture	Tim McGahan & Brett Tomberlin	Nominated	
Golden Raspberry Awards	February 23, 2019	Worst Director	The Spierig Brothers	Nominated	
Golden Raspberry Awards	February 23, 2019	Worst Actress	Helen Mirren	Nominated	
Golden Raspberry Awards	February 23, 2019	Worst Screenplay	The Spierig Brothers & Tom Vaughan	Nominated	

== See also ==
- Cinema of Australia
