= The Chain Reaction =

- Theatrical film poster
- Directed by: Ian Barry
- Written by: Ian Barry
- Produced by: David Elfick
- Starring: Steve Bisley; Arna-Maria Winchester; Ross Thompson; Ralph Cotterill; Hugh Keays-Byrne; Lorna Lesley; Richard Moir
- Cinematography: Russell Boyd
- Edited by: Tim Wellburn
- Music by: Andrew Thomas Wilson
- Production companies: Palm Beach Pictures; Victorian Film Corporation; Australian Film Commission
- Distributed by: Hoyts Distribution (Australia); Warner Bros. Pictures (International)
- Release date: 25 September 1980
- Running time: 92 minutes
- Country: Australia
- Language: English
- Budget: A$450,000
- Box office: A$796,000 (Australia)

The Chain Reaction is a 1980 Australian science fiction thriller film written and directed by Ian Barry. The film stars Steve Bisley and Arna-Maria Winchester. The film's plot is about an engineer badly injured in an accident caused by an earthquake. He knows that the nuclear waste will poison the groundwater and wants to warn the public.

The movie features many cast members from Mad Max, among them Mel Gibson as a bearded mechanic, in an uncredited cameo. The taglines used in advertising the film included "A fast drive to Paradise turns into a nuclear nightmare!" and "Mad Max meets The China Syndrome".

The film was rated M in Australia.

== Plot ==
An earthquake in rural Australia causes a dangerous leak at WALDO (Western Atomic Longterm Dumping Organisation), a nuclear waste storage facility. Heinrich Schmidt an engineer badly contaminated in the accident, knows that the leak will poison the groundwater for hundreds of miles around and wants to warn the public. His boss, however, is only interested in protecting himself and believes that the accident should be covered up, when in fact the contamination risks thousands of lives. Heinrich escapes from the facility but is badly injured. Lost in the woods and suffering from amnesia, he is rescued by Larry Stilson, a car mechanic and Vietnam Veteran on holiday, and his wife Carmel. As Heinrich tries to piece together his memories of what happened, his boss' thugs are quickly closing in on the trio.

== Cast ==
- Steve Bisley – Larry Stilson
- Arna-Maria Winchester – Carmel Stilson
- Ross Thompson – Heinrich Schmidt
- Ralph Cotterill – Gray
- Hugh Keays-Byrne – Eagle
- Lorna Lesley – Gloria
- Richard Moir – Junior Constable Pigott
- Patrick Ward – Oates
- Laurie Moran – Police Sgt. McSweeney
- Michael Long – Doctor
- Bill McCluskey – Ralph
- Margo Lloyd – Molly
- Tim Burns – Survey driver
- Arthur Sherman - Byron Langley
- Barry Donnelly - Gateman
- P. J. Jones - Bernie the Beater
- David Bracks - Spray Painter
- Jone Winchester - Marcia
- Joshua Ward - Jason Stillson
- Ryan McKibbon - Stephen Stillson
- Kim Gyngell - Crabs
- Roger Ward - Moose
- Sal Sharah - Pellegrini
- Frankie J. Holden - Farts
- Mel Gibson – Bearded mechanic (uncredited)
- Will Taylor – Little kid

== Production ==
A car chase sequence of The Chain Reaction.

The film was the idea of director Ian Barry. He had been talking to producer David Elfick about making a film called Sparks about a blind film director, based on a short film he had made, but Elfick thought the subject matter would be too difficult to finance. Barry had written another film, a thriller then entitled The Man at the Edge of the Freeway, and Elfick decided to make that instead. The movie was budgeted at $600,000 but the Australian Film Commission thought it was too high so it was re-budgeted at $450,000. George Miller came on the project as associate producer.

Funding came from the Australian Film Commission, Victorian Film Corporation and Hoyts. Shooting started in September 1979 and took place in Sydney and Glen Davis, New South Wales. Elfick says the location at Glen Davis was rumoured to be the site of an aboriginal massacre and was supposed to be cursed; he believed it because filming was extremely difficult.

Filming took longer than expected and the movie went 40% over budget. Miller was tasked with directing the car chase sequences, which featured the Ford Fairlane LTD in most scenes as the preferred vehicle of the antagonistic authority chasing Larry's modified Holden HQ ute. David Elfick also filmed some second unit.

The film was shot with a widescreen anamorphic lens. Post production was reputedly very difficult with representatives from the AFC, VFC and Hoyts supervising and discussing every cut of the film.

== Distribution ==
The film was released shortly after Mad Max and it has a similar theme to that film as well as American films like The China Syndrome in regards to the whole nuclear-apocalyptic storyline.

The film was distributed in Australia by Palm Beach Pictures and Warner Bros. Pictures in the rest of the world and released on 25 September 1980.

== Soundtrack ==
The Chain Reaction

Soundtrack album by Andrew Thomas Wilson
- Released: 1980
- Recorded: 1980
- Genres: Rock, film score

The music for the film was composed by Andrew Thomas Wilson.

=== Track listing ===
1. "Awakening" (1:46)
2. "The Beast" (4:17)
3. "Decontamination" (2:05)
4. "Heinrich's Theme" (3:00)
5. "WALDO" (1:17)
6. "A Swim in the River" (1:48)
7. "Chain Reaction" (4:52)
8. "Once More with Feeling" (3:00)
9. "Paradise Valley" (1:03)
10. "Car Chase" (4:31)
11. "Carmel's Theme" (1:38)
12. "WALDO Arrives" (1:57)
13. "The Hand at the Window" (0:42)
14. "Message to a Friend" (End tiles)(4:28)

== Awards and critical reception ==
Award	Category	Subject	Result
AACTA Awards (1980 AFI Awards)	Best Supporting Actress	Lorna Lesley	Nominated
AACTA Awards (1980 AFI Awards)	Best Cinematography	Russell Boyd	Nominated
AACTA Awards (1980 AFI Awards)	Best Editing	Tim Wellburn	Nominated
AACTA Awards (1980 AFI Awards)	Best Sound	Tim Wellburn	Nominated
AACTA Awards (1980 AFI Awards)	Best Sound	Lloyd Carrick	Nominated
AACTA Awards (1980 AFI Awards)	Best Sound	Phil Judd	Nominated
AACTA Awards (1980 AFI Awards)	Best Production Design	Graham 'Grace' Walker	Nominated
AACTA Awards (1980 AFI Awards)	Best Costume Design	Norma Moriceau	Nominated
Saturn Award	Best International Film		Nominated

The web page TV Guide.com gave 3 out 4 stars. In Yahoo! Movies, the users rating to the film with a C and 5.5 out of 10 in Internet Movie Database.

== Titles around the world ==
Theatrical German poster.

- Detector (Italy)
- Ketjureaktio (Finland)
- Die Kettenreaktion (West Germany)
- Nuclear Run
- Peligro: reacción en cadena (Spain)
- Perigo...Reacção em Cadeia (Portugal)
- Skotoste ton, xerei polla! (Greece)
- The Man at the Edge of the Freeway* (Australia)

*Working title

== Home media ==
The DVD includes these extras:

1. Thills and Nuclear Spills: The making of the film (31:37)
2. The Sparks Obituary (24:50)
3. Deleted and extended scenes (8:14)
4. TV Spot (0:32)
5. Stills and Poster gallery (2:54)
6. "Theatrical Trailer" (3:19)
7. Aussie trailers (9:46)

The video presents a 1.70:1 aspect ratio, originally 1.66:1.

== Box office ==
The world-wide distribution rights were bought by Warner Bros. which put the film instantly in profit. The Chain Reaction grossed A$796,000 at the box office in Australia, which is equivalent to A$3,607,677 in 2021 dollars.

== See also ==
- The China Syndrome
- The Crazies
