= My Brilliant Career (film) =

- Theatrical release poster
- Directed by: Gillian Armstrong
- Screenplay by: Eleanor Witcombe
- Based on: My Brilliant Career; 1901 novel by Miles Franklin
- Produced by: Margaret Fink
- Starring: Judy Davis; Sam Neill
- Cinematography: Donald McAlpine
- Edited by: Nicholas Beauman
- Music by: Nathan Waks
- Production companies: The New South Wales Film Corporation; Margaret Fink Productions
- Distributed by: GUO Film Distributors
- Release date: 17 August 1979
- Running time: 100 minutes
- Country: Australia
- Language: English
- Budget: AU$890,000
- Box office: AU$3,052,000 (Australia) $2.5 million (US/Canada)

My Brilliant Career is a 1979 Australian period drama film directed by Gillian Armstrong, and starring Judy Davis, Sam Neill, and Wendy Hughes. Based on the 1901 novel of the same name by Miles Franklin, it follows a young woman in rural, late-19th-century Australia whose aspirations to become a writer are impeded first by her social circumstance, and later by a budding romance.

Filmed in the Monaro region, New South Wales in 1978, My Brilliant Career was released in Australia in August 1979, and later premiered in the United States at the New York Film Festival. It received significant critical acclaim, and was nominated for numerous AFI Awards, winning three, while Davis won the BAFTA Award for Best Actress in a Leading Role. In the United States, it received nominations for the Academy Award for Best Costume Design, and the Golden Globe Award for Best Foreign Film.

The film is now regarded as part of the Australian New Wave, as well as a piece of feminist cinema. In 2018, it was restored by the Australian National Sound and Film Archive, and was issued on Blu-ray and DVD by the Criterion Collection the following year.

== Plot ==
In 1897 in rural Australia, Sybylla, a headstrong, free-spirited young woman, dreams of a better life to the detriment of helping run her family's country farm. Considered a larrikin by her family, Sybylla dreams of having a career in writing or the performing arts. Her parents, upset by her notions of grandeur and believing her to be stalling her life, inform Sybylla that they can no longer afford to keep her in the household. They send her to board with her wealthy maternal grandmother in hopes of teaching her socially accepted manners and behaviour.

Upon arriving, Sybylla swiftly feels out of place in her new environs. She is soon courted by two local men, jackaroo Frank Hawdon, whom she ignores, and well-to-do childhood friend Harry Beecham, of whom she grows increasingly fond. Sybylla is sent to spend time at the Beecham estate, and her feelings increase toward Harry. She returns to her grandmother's home when Harry is sent on a tour of their properties, with everyone on both estates coyly approving of their romance. Sybylla's Aunt Helen warns her against Harry's courtship, and advises that Sybylla marry for friendship rather than love.

Frank attempts to derail Harry and Sybylla's budding relationship by sparking rumours, which leads to increasing tensions between the two. Harry and Sybylla take turns attempting to make the other jealous at a ball, leading to Harry's surprise proposal. Sybylla gruffly rejects him, to everyone's surprise. Harry later reveals his rush was to protect Sybylla from his potential financial collapse. Sybylla counters by asking Harry to wait while she discovers herself, and asks him to delay his proposal for two years.

Sybylla is summoned by her grandmother, and is told she must take a job as governess and housekeeper to the indigent family of an illiterate neighbour to whom her father owes money. Working in squalor, she manages to teach the children to read using the newspapers and book pages wallpapering their home. To her delight, Sybylla is eventually sent home when the parents become incorrectly convinced that she is wooing their eldest son. Harry visits and proposes again, but Sybylla again rejects him, stating her intent to become a writer; she tenderly explains that a marriage between the two would be emotionally damaging.

Returning to her family's farm, Sybylla completes a manuscript of her first novel, My Brilliant Career, which she hopefully mails off to a Scottish publishing house.

== Cast ==
- Judy Davis as Sybylla Melvyn
- Sam Neill as Harry Beecham
- Wendy Hughes as Aunt Helen
- Robert Grubb as Frank Hawdon
- Max Cullen as Mr McSwatt
- Aileen Britton as Grandma Bossier
- Peter Whitford as Uncle Julius
- Patricia Kennedy as Aunt Gussie
- Alan Hopgood as Father
- Julia Blake as Mother
- David Franklin as Horace
- Marion Shad as Gertie
- Aaron Wood as Stanley
- Sue Davies as Aurora
- Gordon Piper as Barman
- Simone Buchanan as Mary-Anne
- Carole Skinner as Mrs McSwatt
- Tony Hughes as Peter McSwatt

== Production ==
=== Development ===
Margaret Fink had purchased the rights to Miles Franklin's novel of the same name, and the Australian Film Development Corporation suggested she hire a writer to adapt it and Fink selected Eleanor Witcombe. Gillian Armstrong met Fink while working as an assistant art director on the latter's The Removalists (1975) and Fink was impressed with her short film "A Hundred a Day". She subsequently hired Armstrong to direct. Greater Union invested $200,000 in the project, the NSW Film Corporation invested $450,000 with the balance coming from private investors.

Armstrong brought in editor Ted Ogden to work on the script, which caused tension between her and Witcombe. For a time Witcombe threatened to take her name off the credits but ultimately decided not to. Commenting on her aspirations for the film, Armstrong said in 1979: "I wanted to make the statement that the heroine is a full woman who can develop her talents and have a career. I didn't want to reinforce the old stereotypes that a woman who has a career only does so only because she can't get a man."

=== Casting ===
The role of Sybylla was cast in January 1978 but when the actress was tested in costume it was felt she was wrong for the role. Judy Davis was cast instead; it was her first leading role.

=== Filming ===
Principal photography of My Brilliant Career took place over eight weeks in October and November 1978 in the Monaro region of New South Wales. Some scenes were shot at the Ryrie homestead at Michelago, New South Wales with Camden Park Estate featuring as Harry Beecham's 'Five Bob Downs' property. The film's theme music was an arrangement from "Of Foreign Lands and People" from Robert Schumann's Kinderszenen. Davis plays her on-screen piano part herself. Other pieces of classical music used in the film include arrangements of "Träumerei" from Kinderszenen, and of the Piano Quartet in E♭ minor by Schumann.

== Release ==
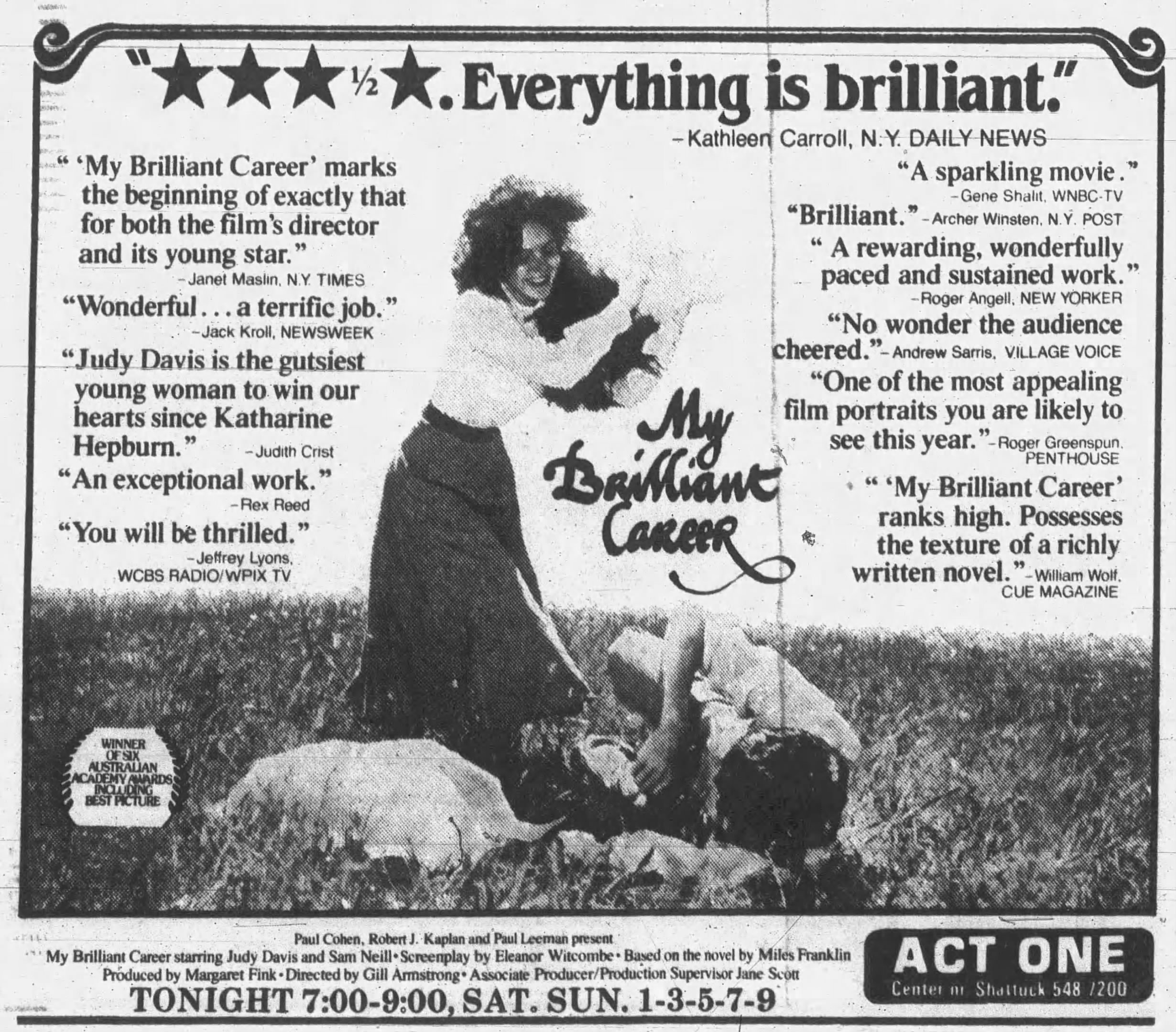
U.S. theatrical advertisement, 1980

My Brilliant Career was shown at the Cannes Film Festival in 1979 and received a warm reception. The film had its international debut in New York City at the New York Film Festival on 1 February 1980, followed by a release in Japan on 2 January 1982, and in Poland on 23 July 2007 at Era New Horizons Film Festival.

=== Box office ===
My Brilliant Career grossed $3,052,000 at the box office in Australia.

=== Critical response ===
Charles Champlin of the Los Angeles Times lauded the film for its "resolute and courageous ending," also deeming it "beautifully written, photographed, directed, and acted." The New York Times' Janet Maslin also praised the film, noting in her review: "My Brilliant Career doesn't need to trumpet either its or its heroine's originality this loudly. The facts speak for themselves—and so does the radiance with which Miss Armstrong and Miss Davis invest so many memorable moments." William Mootz of the Courier Journal wrote "It's a beautiful film, handsomely photographed, faultlessly directed, and magically acted. If you've been dismayed by the sometimes glib, often trashy, and frequently just plain inept stuff that has gorged the screen in recent months, My Brilliant Career may well restore your faith."

It has an 86% approval rating on Rotten Tomatoes from 21 reviews.

==== Accolades ====
Award	Category	Recipient	Result	Ref.
AACTA Awards (1979 AFI Awards)	Best Film	Margaret Fink	Won	
AACTA Awards (1979 AFI Awards)	Best Direction	Gillian Armstrong	Won	
AACTA Awards (1979 AFI Awards)	Best Adapted Screenplay	Eleanor Witcombe	Won	
AACTA Awards (1979 AFI Awards)	Best Actress	Judy Davis	Nominated	
AACTA Awards (1979 AFI Awards)	Best Supporting Actor	Robert Grubb	Nominated	
AACTA Awards (1979 AFI Awards)	Best Supporting Actress	Aileen Britton	Nominated	
AACTA Awards (1979 AFI Awards)	Best Supporting Actress	Patricia Kennedy	Nominated	
AACTA Awards (1979 AFI Awards)	Best Supporting Actress	Wendy Hughes	Nominated	
AACTA Awards (1979 AFI Awards)	Best Cinematography	Donald McAlpine	Won	
AACTA Awards (1979 AFI Awards)	Best Editing	Nicholas Beauman	Nominated	
AACTA Awards (1979 AFI Awards)	Best Production Design	Luciana Arrighi	Won	
AACTA Awards (1979 AFI Awards)	Best Costume Design	Anna Senior	Won	
Academy Awards	Best Costume Design	Anna Senior	Nominated	
ACS Award	Cinematographer of the Year	Donald McAlpine	Won	
BAFTA Awards	Best Actress	Judy Davis	Won	
BAFTA Awards	Most Outstanding Newcomer to Leading Film Roles	Judy Davis	Won	
Cannes Film Festival	Palme d'Or	Gillian Armstrong	Nominated	
Golden Globe Awards	Best Foreign Film	My Brilliant Career	Nominated	
Kansas City Film Critics Circle	KCFCC Award for Best Foreign Film		Won	
London Film Critics' Circle	Special Achievement Award	Gillian Armstrong	Won	

=== Home media ===
The American Vestron Video released My Brilliant Career on VHS in 1982. Blue Underground released My Brilliant Career in a two-disc special edition DVD in 2005. A Blu-ray edition was subsequently issued by Blue Underground in 2009.

In 2018, the Australian National Film and Sound Archive restored the film, and this restoration was subsequently issued on DVD and Blu-ray in 2019 by the U.S. home media company the Criterion Collection.

== Legacy ==
My Brilliant Career has been noted by film historians as a part of the Australian New Wave of cinema. In a retrospective essay celebrating the film's inclusion in the Criterion Collection, film scholar Carrie Rickey notes that both the film and its source novel have "become part of Australian identity."

Though Judy Davis received critical acclaim for her performance, director Gillian Armstrong stated that Davis was never fond of the film and disliked her character.

== See also ==
- Cinema of Australia
- My Brilliant Career (TV series), a 2026 Netflix series
