= Devon Minchin =

Australian fighter pilot, entrepreneur (1919 – 2014)

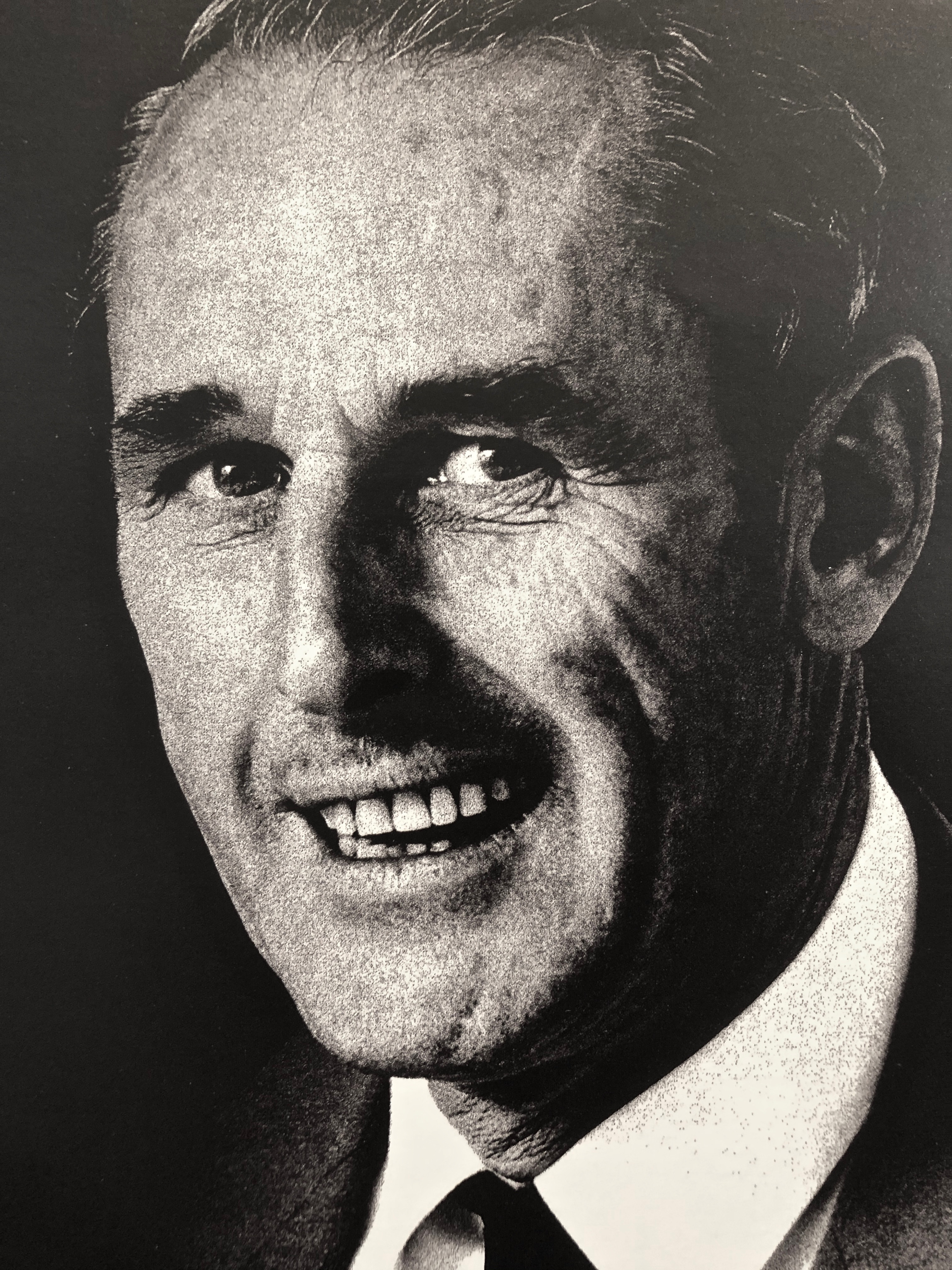
- Born: Devon George Minchin; 28 May 1919; Bondi, New South Wales, Australia
- Died: 30 May 2014 (aged 95); Tewantin, Queensland, Australia
- Occupations: Businessman; author

Devon Minchin (28 May 1919 – 30 May 2014) was an Australian fighter pilot, entrepreneur, security industry pioneer and author.

== Early life ==
Minchin was born at home in Flood Street, Bondi, Sydney, Australia to Alfred Hugh Minchin (1884–1954) and Dora Muriel "Bo" Minchin (née Donaldson) (1883–1985). He was the youngest of the couple's three children, the others being Helen Patricia (1910–2002) and Lester Hugh St Clair (1915–1993). The family was raised in various Sydney suburbs and Minchin attended Lane Cove Public School, Cammeray Public School, Chatswood High School and Knox Grammar School.

Minchin left school in 1934 aged 15 and became an office boy at the George Patterson Agency, where he worked for two years. In 1936 he took a job on a ship and worked his way to England. In London he briefly worked for the advertising agency Samson Clark Price-Berry as an assistant on the Aspro account before landing a job with Vicks. As a trainee salesman, Minchin sold Vicks products in Ireland and the UK before being selected for further sales training in New York. After success in a nationwide sales contest, from 1938 to 1939 he sold wholesale Vicks products throughout Georgia, Alabama, Mississippi and Louisiana as well as New York State.

In 1939 Minchin was sent to Australia to conduct market research for Vicks. He sailed to Sydney on SS Monterey. When war was declared in September 1939 he resigned from Vicks to join the Royal Australian Air Force.

== World War II ==
Minchin enlisted at the RAAF office in Erskine Street, Sydney and was told that he would soon be contacted. In the meantime he took a job with Sheldon Drug Company selling fly spray in regional Queensland. By May 1940 he had not heard back from the RAAF and after making enquiries discovered that his enlistment records were lost. He signed up again in Rockhampton and was sent to No. 7 Course RAAF Bradfield Park. There he passed enough exams to be mustered as a pilot in the Empire Air Training Scheme.

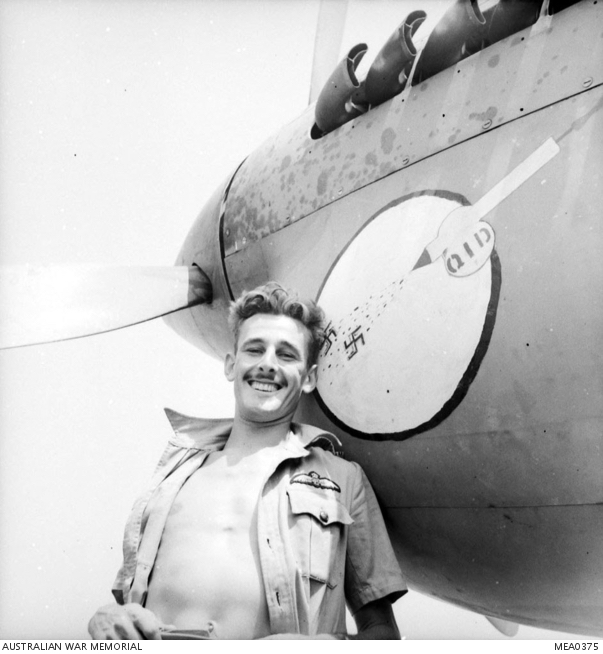
PO Devon Minchin beside his Kittyhawk aircraft. Sicily, 1943 (AWM collection)

He was posted to No. 26 E.A.T.S. Guinea Fowl, Rhodesia to learn to fly on the Tiger Moth. He then went to 22 Central Flying Training School at Thornhill, Bulawayo to train on the Harvard MkI. Following flight training Minchin transited in Kasfareet, Egypt before being sent to defend Aden where he flew the Hawker Hurricane MkI. While in Aden, Minchin wrote his first novel The Potato Man, published by Frank Johnson in 1944. In 1942 Minchin returned to Egypt where he converted to the Curtiss P-40 (Kittyhawk) and joined No. 450 Squadron RAAF ("The Desert Harassers"). He flew 123 operational sorties and was mentioned in dispatches as part of the North African campaign in 1942–1943 and shot down a Messerschmitt Bf 109 during operations over Cape Bon in Tunisia.

Pilot Officer Minchin was also 450 Squadron's unofficial entertainment officer, penning poems and songs and leading the troops at the piano or on the ukulele at any given opportunity. He wrote Marlene's Boyfriend, a parody of the German propaganda song Lili Marlene which became one of the most popular Desert Air Force songs.

After the July 1943 invasion of Sicily, Minchin contracted malaria and was stood down from operations. He became the lessee of The Grand Albergo dell'Etna and with fellow PO Harry Gregory turned the hotel into a respite for Allied officers. In late 1943 Minchin was assigned to production aircraft test pilot duties at No. 7 Maintenance Unit, RAF Kasfareet. He tested 19 different operational types of aircraft until he was returned to Australia in late 1944 due to the ongoing effects of malaria.

Following a six-month stint training Army Air Liaison Officers at the School of Army Air Co-operation in Canberra, Minchin transferred to the Australian Army to join the British Borneo Civil Affairs Unit. There he worked on the rehabilitation of Sandakan following the Japanese surrender.

== Post World War II ==
In 1946 Minchin, his brother Lester and business partner Jack Bartle (former Commanding Officer, 450 Squadron RAAF) purchased a 110-foot, 85 ton ship called The Bellbird and loaded it with goods to sell in Borneo. They sailed from Sydney on 13 April but on their first night at sea they were struck by a big storm and had to scuttle the ship near Barrenjoey, New South Wales.

In 1946 the Minchin brothers and Bartle organised a syndicate that was granted timber milling concessions in Sarawak. The following year they established Colonial Timber Company Limited (CTC) in Kuching. By the time of its sale in 1963 the company had the largest timber concession in the colony. The Minchin brothers along with John Cullity of Cullity Timbers of Western Australia then established Allardyce Lumber Company in the Solomon Islands.

While remaining a director of CTC, Minchin returned to advertising in 1948 becoming circulation manager of The Straits Times in Singapore. His tenure was cut short after only a few months when his wife Susan died of polio on 24 April 1948.

From 1949 to 1952 Devon Minchin was an account executive at Cathay Ltd, a Hong Kong advertising agency.

== MSS ==
In 1954 Minchin founded Metropolitan Security Services, which became Australia's largest privately owned security company before it was sold to Mayne Nickless in 1970. When The Beatles toured Australia in 1964, MSS had the contract to provide security and Minchin took personal charge. He received a note signed by all the members of the band thanking him for allowing "the finest birds and best boomerang makers into the (hotel) suites".

In 1969 Devon Minchin was the founding president of Australian Security Industry Association Limited, which became Australia's peak national security industry body.

In June 1970, thieves stole $289,233 in cash from MSS's Melbourne headquarters. It was at the time, Victoria's biggest ever robbery.

== Later life ==
Following the sale of MSS, Minchin moved to Queensland where he farmed pineapples, bananas and paw paws on the Sunshine Coast. He developed a cinema complex in Noosa Heads and became foundation chairman of the Noosa District Tourist Association Committee. Minchin received a Bachelor of Arts from Macquarie University in 1978 and later his attention turned late Roman history. He completed a trilogy of novels set in 4th century AD Rome and when he was at the age of 91 it was published as Love And The Fall of Rome. Minchin moved from his Yandina farm to Noosa in 2000.

Minchin died on 30 May 2014 aged 95.

== The Money Movers ==
Devon Minchin wrote The Money Movers, which was published in 1972. It is a novel loosely based on the 1970 MSS robbery and an armoured car heist in Sydney the same year. The book was the basis for the 1978 film Money Movers directed by Bruce Beresford. It was at the time considered one of the most violent films ever made in Australia.

== Personal life ==
After meeting her when she was an Australian Army nurse in Labuan, Minchin married Susan Scot-Skirving at St Mark's Darling Point in 1946. Susan died of polio in Singapore on 24 April 1948.

In 1952, Minchin married Betty Bentley (née Rushbrooke) at St Jude's Anglican Church, Dural. Betty was a widow with a daughter Susan Elizabeth (29 Oct 1945 – ) who Devon subsequently legally adopted. The couple had two children, Nicholas Hugh (15 Apr 1953 – ) and Melody Irene (27 Dec 1954 – ). Devon and Betty divorced in 1964.

Minchin married Margot Brickhill (née Slater), who was previously married to Paul Brickhill, in 1964. They had two children, Catherine Jeanette (25 Oct 1965 – 28 Mar 1968) and William Devon Richard (27 Mar 1969 – ).

His eldest son Nick Minchin was a member of the Australian Senate from 1993 to 2011 and a former cabinet minister in the Howard Government.

== Bibliography ==
Minchin wrote the following books:

- The Potato Man. Sydney: Frank Johnson, 1944.
- The Money Movers. Sydney: Angus And Robertson, 1972 and Melbourne: Hutchinson, 1978.
- Isabel's Mine. Sydney: John Ferguson, 1989.
- Love And The Fall of Rome: A Trilogy. Melbourne: Sid Harta, 2010.

Minchin wrote the following short story:

- Dave appears in The Man Gift Book: A presentation of the best Australian writers of to-day. Sydney: K.G. Murray, 1946 (p 152 – 154).

Minchin also wrote a self-published autobiography:

- Let's All Go Round To My Place. Noosaville: Devon Minchin, 2004.

== Film adaptations ==
Minchin's 1972 novel The Money Movers was made into the feature film Money Movers in 1979.
