= Wendy Cork =

Australian costume designer

- Born: 25 July; Goulburn, Australia
- Education: University of New South Wales
- Occupation: Costume designer

Wendy Cork (born 25 July) is an Australian costume designer for film, theatre and television. She is best known for her work on Ladies in Black, Banished, Predestination and Beneath Hill 60.

== Life and career ==
Wendy Cork was born in Goulburn, Australia and graduated from the University of New South Wales with a bachelor of arts in theatre and film. She started her career working in theatre and opera. She made her debut as a costume designer with the film In the Winter Dark, directed by James Bogle in 1998. She also designed the computer-generated clothes for the Rockstar Play-station game, L.A. Noire.

In 2014, she won Hero Frock Hire Award for costume design at the Australian Production Design Guild Awards on a feature film Predestination, directed by The Spierig Brothers starring Ethan Hawke and Sarah Snook. Later she worked with Jimmy McGovern's period drama Banished, which was screened on BBC Two. She won Best Costume Design at the AACTA Awards for Ladies in Black, directed by Bruce Beresford.

== Filmography ==
- In the Winter Dark (1998)
- A Wreck A Tangle (2000)
- The Djarn Djarns (2005)
- The Illustrated Family Doctor (2005)
- The Eternity Man (2008)
- Into My Arms (2009)
- My Mind's Own Melody (2012)
- The Turning (2013)
- Predestination (2014)
- Deep Water: The Real Story (2018)
- Grace (2018)
- Winchester (2018)
- Ladies in Black (2018)

== Television ==
- The Farm (2001)
- Counterstrike (2002)
- Fat Cow Motel (2003)
- Go Big (2004)
- Small Claims (2004)
- Hell Has Harbour Views (2005)
- Small Claims: White Wedding (2005)
- Small Claims: The Reunion (2006)
- BlackJack (Second trilogy) (2006-2007)
- Dangerous (2007)
- East West 101 (2007-2008)
- Valentine's Day (2008)
- Sea Patrol (2009-2010)
- Panic at Rock Island (2011)
- Crownies (2011)
- The Great Mint Swindle (2012)
- The Mystery of a Hansom Cab (2012)
- Twentysomething (2013)
- INXS: Never Tear Us Apart (2014)
- Banished (2015)
- Indian Summers (2016)
- Olivia Newton-John: Hopelessly Devoted to You (2018)
- Secret City (2018)

== Awards and nominations ==
Association	Year	Category	Title	Result	Ref.
AACTA Awards	2010	Best Costume Design	Beneath Hill 60	Nominated	
AACTA Awards	2014	Best Costume Design	Predestination	Nominated	
AACTA Awards	2018	Best Costume Design	Ladies in Black	Won	
AACTA Awards	2018	Best Costume Design	Winchester	Nominated	
APDG Award	2014	Best Costume Design	Predestination	Won	
APDG Award	2016	Best Costume Design	Indian Summers	Nominated	
APDG Award	2018	Best Costume Design	Olivia Newton-John: Hopelessly Devoted to You	Nominated	
APDG Award	2018	Best Costume Design	Winchester	Nominated	
