= Maggie Kirkpatrick =

Australian actress

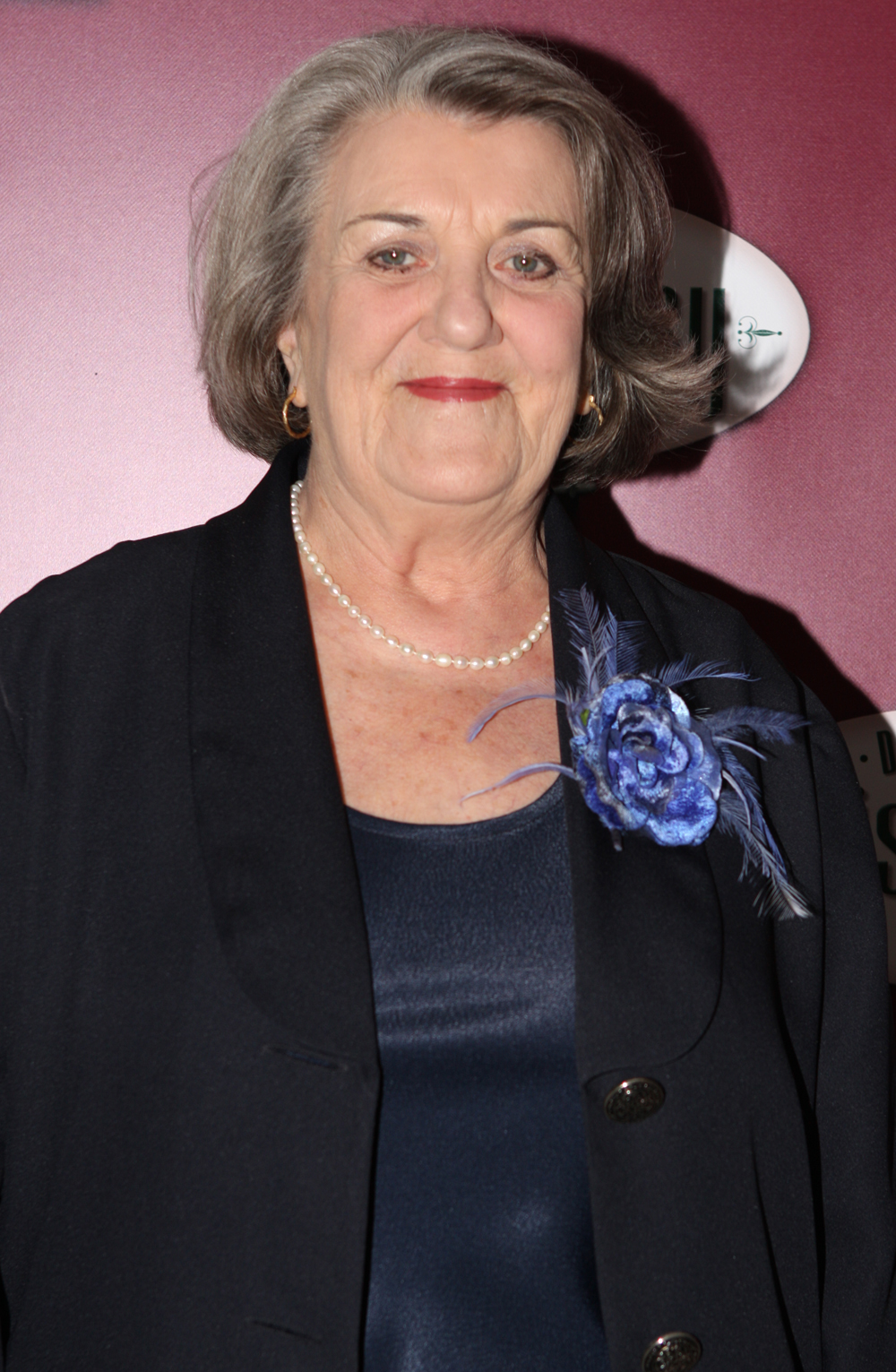
- Kirkpatrick at the opening of Driving Miss Daisy at Theatre Royal, Sydney, 2013
- Born: Margaret Anne Downs; 29 January 1941 (age 85); Albury, New South Wales, Australia
- Occupation: Actress
- Years active: Film and television 1971–present Theatre 1958–2015
- Notable work: Prisoner, Wicked

Margaret Anne Kirkpatrick (née Downs; born 29 January 1941) is an Australian stage and screen actress who has appeared in numerous theatre, television and feature film roles since the late 1950s.

Kirkpatrick starred in the TV series Prisoner (known as Prisoner: Cell Block H in the UK and North America), portraying the character "The Freak" Joan Ferguson, a prison officer with a sinister and cold personality.

She performed in the premiere Australian production of the musical Wicked as Madame Morrible.

Kirkpatrick has appeared in numerous TV series including Richmond Hill, Water Rats, G.P. and Blue Heelers, as well as two roles in All Saints and Home and Away.

In 2019, she released her autobiography The Gloves Are Off: The Inside Story From Prisoner to Wicked.

== Biography ==
Margaret Anne Downs was born in Albury, New South Wales, to James and Crissie Downs. When she was seven months old her father was killed while on active national service as a soldier in North Africa, leaving her mother to bring her up alone. Her mother later married John Anderson and had a son, Adrian. The family moved to Newcastle, New South Wales, where Kirkpatrick grew up. She had had an interest in acting from an early age, and appeared in several school plays. By November 1955 she became fed up with school and left, whereupon her mother sent her to drama lessons.

In 1960, at the age of 19, Kirkpatrick took her first professional acting job, with theatre impresario John Alden's Shakespeare Company. After this initial production she promptly gave up acting. Kirkpatrick subsequently took various jobs, including working in dress shop, as a medical receptionist, compère of fashion parades, and she also had jobs in bars, restaurants, and hotels.

Downs married Norman Kirkpatrick, a merchant seaman of the Shankill Road in Belfast, in September 1963. Five years later they moved to Sydney where Kirkpatrick decided to resume her acting career. After appearing in two plays she put her acting career on hold once again, this time due to the arrival of her daughter Caitlin. Kirkpatrick resumed theatre work as Caitlin got older from 1964 onwards, and from 1976 onwards moved on to television and cinema.

Kirkpatrick appeared in the music video for "Anthem for the Year 2000" by rock band Silverchair.

She is a supporter of gay rights, having made numerous appearances at "Fair Day" as part of the annual Sydney Gay and Lesbian Mardi Gras Festival. She has been awarded the Sydney Gay Community's DIVA award for her work.

Kirkpatrick returned to TV in 2017 after a 9-year hiatus, having in recent years appearing primarily in theatre roles, appearing in Australian TV mini-series The Letdown.

=== Personal life ===
In July 2015, Kirkpatrick was charged with child sexual assault against a 13-year-old girl, alleged to have occurred in 1984. The girl, who was a fan of tv show Prisoner and at that time a resident of a psychiatric hospital, had been invited by Kirkpatrick to her home after the two met through another resident who had also worked on the show. Kirkpatrick strongly denied the allegations, and said that she had sent the girl home in a taxi after she was found to be stealing alcohol.

Kirkpatrick said she would fight to clear her name of the two counts of indecent assault and one count of gross indecency with a person under the age of 16. In a statement Kirkpatrick said, "Yes, allegations have been levelled at me. Are they true? Absolutely not."

Kirkpatrick was found guilty on 20 August 2015. She was subsequently sentenced to an 18-month community corrections order, including 100 hours of community service. Kirkpatrick appealed her conviction and won, with Judge Geoffrey Chettle finding that there was reasonable doubt surrounding the circumstances, dismissing the conviction and charges. Chettle additionally stated that in 1984, the complainant was a very disturbed young woman, who was at that time "clearly vulnerable and unstable". Character evidence had shown the court that Kirkpatrick's dinner invitation to the young girl was consistent with her past behaviour as a caring woman, helping other young people.

== Filmography ==
Film

Title	Year	Role	Notes
1976	Summer of Secrets		Feature film
1977	The FJ Holden	Betty Armstead	Feature film
1978	The Night, the Prowler	Madge Hopkirk	Feature film
1978	The Getting of Wisdom	Sarah	Feature film
1982	The Pirate Movie	Ruth	Feature film
1993	Encounters (aka Voyage into Terror)	Aunt Helen	Feature film
1995	Billy's Holiday	Maureen O'Hara	Feature film
1996	Lilian's Story		Feature film
1997	Welcome to Woop Woop	Ginger	Feature film
2002	Hetty	Thelma	Film short

Television

Year	Title	Character	Type
1971	The Thursday Creek Mob		TV series
1972	Snake Gully with Dad and Dave		TV series
1972	The Godfathers	Daisy Simmons	TV series, 1 episode
1977	Father, Dear Father in Australia	Mrs. Floyd	TV series, season 1, episode 12: "The Wisdom of Patrick"
1978	Chopper Squad	Mrs. Roland	TV series, season 2, episode 3: "A Deed Without a Name"
1979	The Oracle		TV series, 1 episode
1981	Cop Shop	Aunt Florrie	TV series, 3 episodes
1982	Jonah		TV miniseries, 4 episodes
1982	Spring & Fall	Anne	TV series, season 2, episode 4: "Thanks Brother"
1982–1986	Prisoner	Joan 'The Freak' Ferguson	TV series, season 4–8, 389 episodes, regular role
1987	Dearest Enemy		TV pilot
1988	Richmond Hill	Ivy Hackett	TV series, 59 episodes, regular role
1990	Betty's Bunch	Betty	TV series, 9 episodes, lead role
1990	The Ham Funeral	Mrs. Fauburgus	Teleplay
1990	TV Celebrity Dance Party	Herself as Joan 'The Freak' Ferguson (performing "What's Love Got to Do With It")	TV special
1991	Home and Away	Aunt Jean Chambers	TV series, 7 episodes, recurring role
1991	The Miraculous Mellops	Mrs. Kafka	TV series, 3 episodes
1992	Hey Dad..!	Sister Maureen	TV series, season 8 episode 1: "Nun The Wiser"
1994	The Ferals	Aunt Mavis	TV series, season 1, episode 8: "Rock Horror"
1995	G.P.	Joan Mullins	TV series, season 7, episode 13: "Relative Strangers"
1999	Water Rats	Sadie Seymor	TV series, 1 episode, Season 4, episode 20 "Red Light"
2000	Pizza	Joan Ferguson	TV series, season 1, episode 9: "Gambling Pizza"
2000	Blue Heelers	Marj Cummings	TV series, season 7, episode 21: "The Gumshoe"
2001	All Saints	Dawn Healy	TV series, season 4, episode 18: "Bed of Roses"
2003–04	Home And Away	Viv 'The Guv' Standish	TV series, 11 episodes; season 16–17, recurring role
2008	All Saints	Maria	TV series, season 11, episode 7: "Little Decisions"
2017	The Letdown	Lois	TV series, season 1, episode 6: "Mother Nature"
2018	Sando	Catherine	TV series, season 1, episode 1: "Prodigal Mum"
2018	The Bureau of Magical Things	Doris (voice)	TV series, 4 episodes
2021	Eden	Florence Eden	TV series, 4 episodes

=== Other appearances ===
Year	Title	Role	Notes
2023	Studio 10	Guest (with Craig Bennett)	TV series, 1 episode
2022	Talking Prisoner Podcast	Herself	Web series, 2 episodes
2019	A Current Affair	Herself	TV series, 1 episode
2012	Talkin' 'Bout Your Generation	Guest	TV series, 1 episode
2008	Postcards	Herself	TV series, 1 episode
2008	An Audience With The Cast Of Wicked	Herself	TV Special
2008	Today Tonight	Herself	TV series, 1 episode
2006	Where Are They Now?	Herself	TV series, 1 episode
2005	Studio A with Simon Burke	Herself	TV series, 1 episode
2004	The Shoe-Horn Sonata Review	Herself	TV special
2002	The Best of Aussie Cop Shows	Herself	TV special
2001	Aussies: Who Gives a XXXX	Herself	TV special
1998	Life Changes	Herself	TV series, 1 episode
1997	Beauty and the Beast	Herself	TV series, 3 episodes
1996	Monday to Friday	Herself	TV series, 2 episodes
1996	40 Years of TV Stars... Then and Now	Herself	TV special
1995	Sale of the Century: Battle of the TV Classics	Herself	TV series, 1 episode
1995	Whale On	Herself	TV series, 1 episode
1994	Mulray	Herself	TV series, 1 episode
1994	Day to Day	Herself	TV series, 1 episode
1993	Celebrity Squares	Herself	TV series, 2 episodes
1993	Review	Herself	TV series, 1 episode
1993	At Home	Herself	TV series, 1 episode
1976	Who Do You Think You Are?	Herself	TV series, 1 episode

== Theatre ==
Source: AusStage

Title	Year
The Hostage	1958
Lysistrata	1961
Flash Jim Vaux	1965
Postmark Zero	1968
America Hurrah	1968
Going, Going, Gone!	1968
The Skin of our Teeth	1969
You Know I Can't Hear You When the Water's Running	1969
The Bandwagon	1970
Mate	1970
Tom Paine	1971
Edward John Eyre / The Soldiers Tale	1971
Truth	1971
Childhood's Doll	1971
The Disorderly Women	1971
The Seagull	1972
A Voyage Round My Father	1973
Irene	1974 / 1975
Songs from Sideshow Alley	1975
All Over	1976
Family Lore	1976
A Man of Respect	1976
We Find the Bunyip	1976
The Ripper Show (and How They Wrote It)	1976
Don't Piddle Against the Wind, Mate	1977
The Time Is Not Yet Ripe	1977
The Lower Depths	1977
The Cassidy Album: A Hard God/Furtive Love/ An Eager Hope	1978
Da	1978
The Night of the Iguana	1979
A Cheery Soul	1979
Deathtrap	1979
The Druid's Rest	1979
Pirates at the Barn	1980
The One Day of the Year	1980
Farewell Brisbane Ladies	1981
Little Me	1983
Absurd Person Singular	1986
Emerald City	1987
Blood Relations	1987
Anything Goes	1989
The Ham Funeral	1989
Don's Party	1990
Sailor Beware!	1991
Prisoner: Cell Block H: The Musical	1992 UK
Lend Me a Tenor	1993
The Shoe-Horn Sonata	1995
The Wild Women Of Wentworth (Cell Block H)	1995–96 UK
The Screw Is Loose	1997
A Passionate Woman	1997
Social Climbers	1998
A Delicate Balance	1998
The Cripple of Inishmaan	1998
The Beauty Queen of Leenane	1999–2000
Peggy for You	2000
Singin in the Rain	2001–02
Major Barbara	2003
Still Here	2003
The Shoe-Horn Sonata	2004–05
The Q Story	2005
Fiddler on the Roof	2005
Wicked	2008–15

== Awards ==
=== Mo Awards ===
The Australian Entertainment Mo Awards (commonly known informally as the Mo Awards), were annual Australian entertainment industry awards. They recognise achievements in live entertainment in Australia from 1975 to 2016. Maggie Kirkpatrick won one award in that time.

Year	Nominee / work	Award	Result (wins only)
2000	Maggie Kirkpatrick	Female Actor in a Play	Won
