= Monster Chetwynd =

British artist

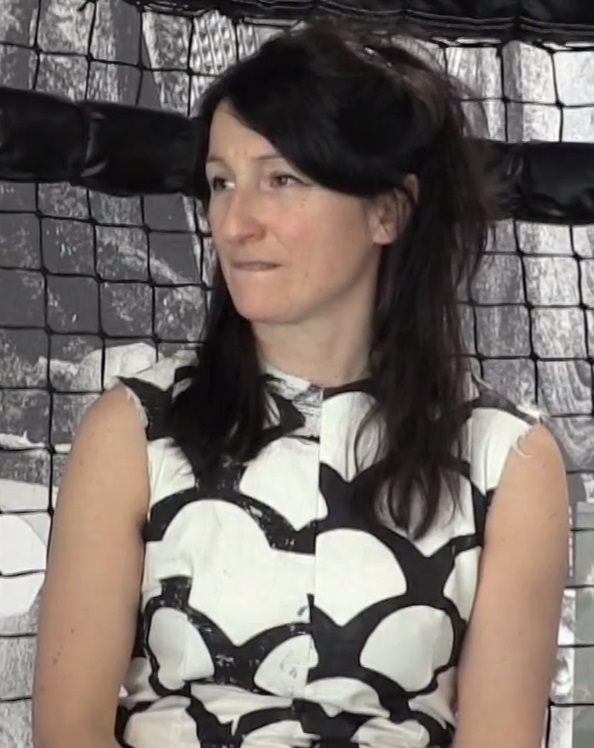
- Chetwynd The Idol, Barking, March 2015
- Born: Alalia Chetwynd; 1973 (age 52–53)
- Other names: Alalia Chetwynd (Christened as) Lali Chetwynd (raised as) (2006 to September 2013); Marvin Gaye Chetwynd (September 2013 to April 2018) Monster Chetwynd (April 2018 to present)

Monster Chetwynd (born Alalia Chetwynd, 1973, best known as Spartacus Chetwynd and Marvin Gaye Chetwynd) is a British artist known for reworkings of iconic moments from cultural history in improvised performances. In 2012, she was nominated for the Turner Prize.

== Life ==
Alalia Chetwynd is the daughter of Luciana Arrighi, an Oscar-winning production designer, and Rupert Chetwynd, a former soldier (Captain in the Grenadier Guards and 21st SAS Regiment), author, and aid worker in Afghanistan, a descendant of the 6th Viscount Chetwynd. Chetwynd was educated at the private school Bedales School, then studied anthropology at University College London (UCL) before training as a painter at UCL's Slade School of Fine Art and the Royal College of Art. She adopted the name Spartacus Chetwynd in 2006. Her husband is the Polish artist Jedrzej Cichosz; they have a son.

== Work ==
Chetwynd’s practice combines performance, sculpture, painting, installation and video. Her performances and videos harness elements of folk plays, street spectacles, literature and multiple other genres. They generally employ troupes of performers – friends and relatives of the artist – and feature handmade costumes and props. For over a decade, she has also worked on an extensive series of paintings collectively titled Bat Opera.

Participating in New Contemporaries in 2004, she was shortlisted for the Beck's Futures prize in 2005. Her contribution to the 2006 Tate Triennial was The Fall of Man, a puppet-play based on The Book of Genesis, Paradise Lost and The German Ideology. In 2009 her work Hermitos Children was included in "Altermodern", the fourth Tate Triennial. The filmed performance was summarised by Adrian Searle as, "The young woman who rode to her own death on the dildo see-saw at the Sugar-Tits Doom Club," and described by Richard Dorment as, "Silly beyond words and teetered at times on the edge of porn – but once you start looking at it I defy you to tear yourself away." Hermitos Children 2 was premiered in 2014 at Studio Voltaire, London, and Hermitos Children 3 is currently in production. Recent performances include ‘The King Must Die’, Edinburgh Art Festival (2015); ‘Listen Up!’, Studio Voltaire, London (2014); and ‘The Green Room’, Nottingham Contemporary, UK (2014).

Characterised as reworking iconic moments from cultural history, Chetwynd's performances and installations translate and adapt her source materials (whether The Canterbury Tales, Doris Lessing’s novel The Grass is Singing or the character of the Cat Bus from Hayao Miyazaki’s cartoon My Neighbor Totoro) into a distinctive style, marked by improvisation and spontaneity.

Her works are held in the Saatchi Gallery, Migros Museum für Gegenwartskunst in Zürich, the Tate, the British Council collection., the Arts Council Collection, Le Consortium Dijon, Musée des Beaux-Arts de Dijon, Museum De Pont Tilburg, and New Walk Museum and Art Gallery, Leicester.

== See also ==
- What Do Artists Do All Day?
