= Susannah Fowle =

Australian actress

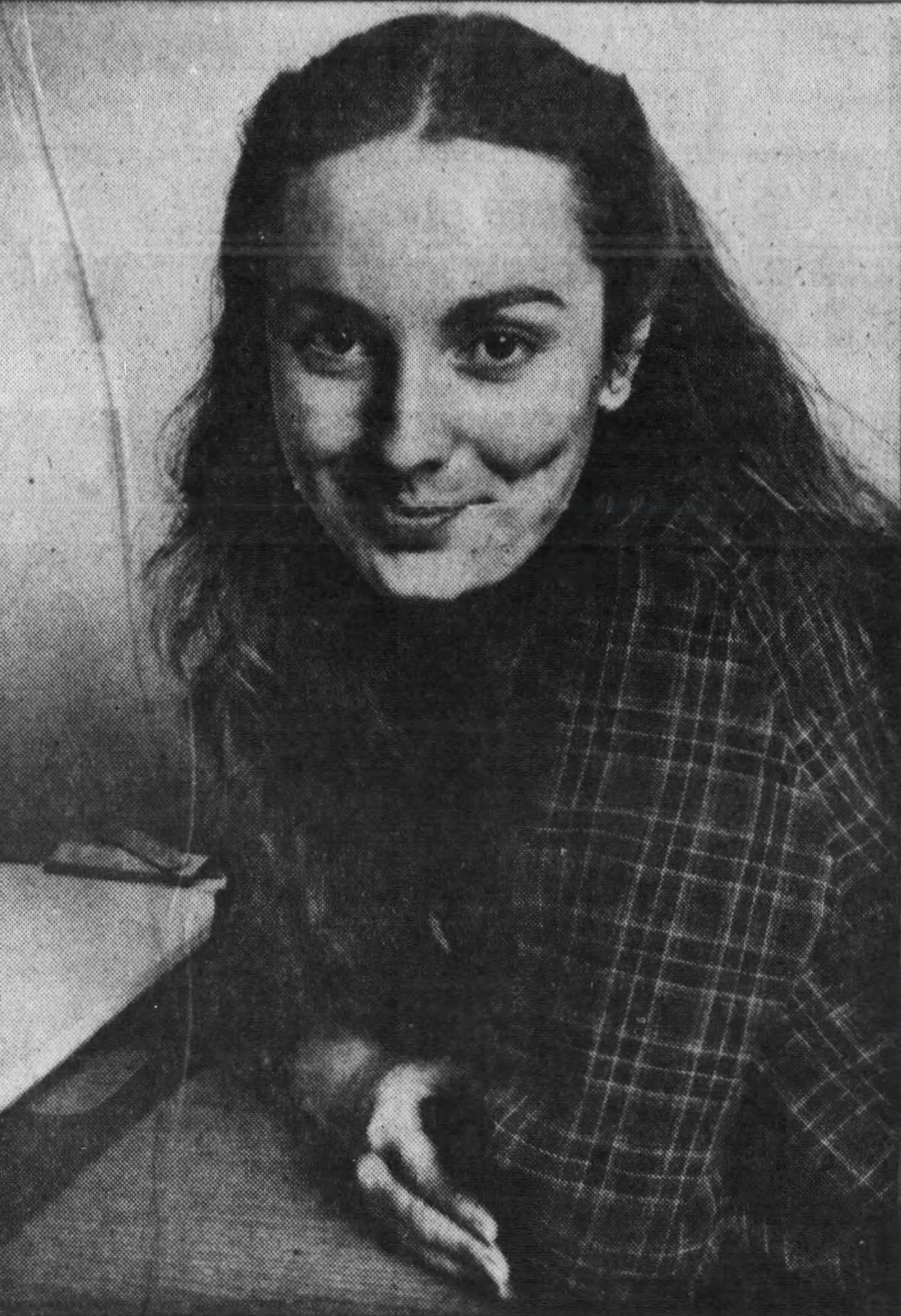
- Fowle in 1980
- Born: Melbourne, Australia
- Occupation: Actress

Susannah Fowle (born 1958) is an Australian actress of stage and screen.

== Career ==
Fowle is known for her lead role as Laura Tweedle Rambotham in the 1978 film The Getting of Wisdom, which was adapted from the novel of the same name by Henry Handel Richardson. Fowle had no formal training and she was discovered by director Bruce Beresford. After travelling overseas to promote The Getting of Wisdom, Fowle returned to Melbourne, where she was cast in the ABC period series Outbreak of Love as one of the Langton twins.

Fowle quit her job as a kindergarten teacher to take up acting full time, after she was offered a role in the television series Prisoner as Lori Young, daughter of inmate Judy Bryant (Betty Bobbitt). Of joining the cast, Fowle said "For the two years Prisoner has been on air, I wanted to act in the series. Finally my dream has come true." She began filming for the show in April 1981 and her first scenes aired in July.

She performed on stage in The Boiling Frog at the Nimrod Theatre in 1984. She also worked for the State Theatre Company of Northern Territory in 1987 and performed in The Sentimental Bloke and Trumpets and Raspberries.
