= The Removalists =

1971 play by David Williamson and 1975 film by Tom Jeffrey

- Poster of the 1971 Sydney production
- Original language: English
- Written by: David Williamson
- Genre: play
- Setting: Melbourne

Premiere
- Date: 1971

The Removalists is a play written by Australian playwright David Williamson in 1971. The main issues the play addresses are violence, specifically domestic violence, and the abuse of power and authority. The story, like Wake in Fright, is widely-interpreted as a microcosm of 1970s Australian society.

It was adapted into a Margaret Fink-produced film in 1975.

== Plot ==
The play begins in a police station in a crime-ridden suburb in Melbourne, Australia, where Constable Neville Ross, just out of police training and ready for his first placement, meets old and experienced Sergeant Dan Simmonds. Set in a time of radical change in Australian society, Simmonds is revealed to be very chauvinistic, a great juxtaposition from Ross' nervous character. Ross is also hesitant to reveal to Simmonds his father's career as a coffin maker. While Ross is being verbally tested by Simmonds, two women enter the station, Kate Mason and Fiona Carter, who are sisters. Mason is a stuck-up, authoritative woman, who married well, whereas Carter is nervous and timid. Kate reveals that Fiona's husband, Kenny, has been abusing her. Simmonds suggests that Ross take the job. Kate is displeased, strongly disagrees, and demands that Simmonds personally take their case.

She says that there are bruises on Fiona's back and thigh, which Simmonds inspects personally, and even photographs (he says that a view by the "medically untrained eye" would look good on the police report). Before setting out, Fiona tells them that there is furniture that she paid for that needs to be taken before Kenny is apprehended. She suggests getting it while he Kenny at the pub with his friends. Simmonds is keen to assist the women with the removal of the furniture because he sees the possibility of sexual reward.

The next act takes place in Fiona and Kenny's apartment; but Kenny gets home before the furniture removalist arrives. Fiona tries to get him to leave, but he becomes suspicious. Kate then arrives. Kenny finally decides to go to the pub as usual, but then the removalist knocks on the door, which Kenny answers. He becomes agitated when the removalist assures him that he was called to the address. Kenny slams the door on him, but there is another knock, which is revealed to be Simmonds and Ross. Kenny is handcuffed to the door, while Ross and the removalist begin to take the furniture. After repeated verbal abuse from Kenny, Simmonds beats him, to the distress of Fiona.

Simmonds picks out from subtle hints in Kate and Fiona's talk that Kate is a repeat adulterer and begins to berate her. She becomes agitated and leaves, but Simmonds follows her and continues to argue; Fiona follows as well. Meanwhile, Ross uncuffs Kenny to take him to the station, but after lengthy insults, Ross loses it and severely beats Kenny. They run into another room, where violent acts are heard. Ross exits, distressed, with signs of blood on him.

Simmonds comes back alone (the sister having taken a taxi to her new apartment), and finds Ross begging for help, as he believes Kenny to be dead. After inspecting, Simmonds agrees, and the two distraughtly try to think of suggestions for justifying Kenny's death. As they do, Kenny crawls out, severely beaten and barely stable. Ross and Simmonds are alerted to his presence when he lights a cigarette. Ross is relieved, but Simmonds does not agree with the suggestion that he be brought to a hospital; instead, he bargains with Kenny with the lure of a prostitute, in exchange for the assurance that he would keep the incident quiet. Kenny agrees, but after a few moments, he suddenly falls on the floor and dies. Ross again becomes distressed and agitated, he then punches Simmonds in the hope that it would look as if Kenny assaulted the officers. The play ends with the two policemen desperately punching each other.

== Characters ==
There are six characters in the play. There are some unseen characters, however, such as a car salesman, Fiona's Mother and Kenny's baby daughter Sophie.

=== Simmonds ===
Simmonds is the police sergeant who abuses his power by threatening the new recruit, Ross. He is a chauvinistic hypocrite who has no respect for women, including his own wife and daughter. He sees to satisfy his sexually perverse needs through the pretext of examining his clients, such as Fiona, for marks "apparent to the medically untrained eye". His clients, usually victims of circumstances, are in desperate need of help.

Through the character Simmonds, Williamson shows that the authority conferred upon society can be exploitative and violent. Williamson demonstrates that should abuse occur in a police station and under the witness of policemen, their victims are rendered powerless. Through the portrayal of the policemen as powerful and somewhat uncontrollable in their nature towards the end of the play, Williamson displays and highlights a serious social issue of the time, therefore making it one of his most remembered works.

=== Ross ===
Ross is a new recruit who was sent to Simmonds' station after finishing police training. Throughout the play, he is depicted as a naive and inexperienced officer despite coming from an educated background. He is often forced to follow Simmonds constant demands and listen to Simmonds' comments on his own inadequacies. This is shown when Simmonds questions Kenny: "Do you think he's (Ross) lacking in initiative?" Ross comes across as a nervous character in the beginning of the play, but his violent and uncontrollable behaviour is raised through his sudden, unexpected attack on Kenny, which inevitably led to Kenny's death.

=== Kate ===
Kate Mason is married with three children. The wife of a dentist, she enjoys an upper class lifestyle. Her children attend one of Melbourne's "better" (more exclusive/expensive) schools. Kate forms a feminine mirror to Simmonds. They both like to be in a position of power, which is evident of Kate's controlling of her sister Fiona. Like Simmonds, Kate has been unfaithful to her partner on numerous occasions.

=== Fiona ===
Fiona Carter is Kate's sister. Fiona wants to have a separation from her husband Kenny, after being beaten by him, but does not want a divorce. She is a passive housewife and fits into the stereotypical gender roles of 1970s Australia. She is married to Kenny, and has a baby daughter Sophie. Fiona is insecure, vulnerable and hesitant to leave.

=== Kenny ===
Kenny is depicted as a "larrikin" working-class man, and represents the stereotypical egoistic "Aussie" male of the 1970s. The play's action is instigated by Kenny's beating of his wife Fiona, the reporting of which prompts her visit to Ross and Simmonds's police station, and her move out of their shared home. Kenny is very hot-headed and his vocabulary is vulgar Australian vernacular.

The play's major plot twist occurs in the final minutes when Kenny, despite apparently having recovered from a beating by Ross to the point where he begins to negotiate a deal with the two officers, dies suddenly at mid-conversation from a brain hemorrhage. In the end Kenny seems to be the victim.

=== The Removalist ===
The Removalist (Rob) is the man who moves the furniture out of Fiona and Kenny's house when they are separating. The Removalist represents the everyman who 'sits on the fence'. His main concern is getting paid for the work, and running off to the next 'job'. He represents another part of Australian society who are passive in times of crisis. The Removalist is a curious character in the play. He plays no role in involving himself in helping others. The only thing that is known is that he has 'ten thousand dollars' worth of machinery tickin' over there'. The role of the Removalist, as well as being one of the plays namesakes, is to be a symbol of the outside world, society at the time, and is where the plays meaning grows. He watches the bashing without a worry, sometimes seeing humour in it. The fact that he does not react as the audience does, not even helping Kenny when he is begged, shows a stereotypical society of the time: as long as their own work is done what they witness is not worth the time of day, and generally a blind eye is turned when the police are in power, even if what they are doing is wrong. " Sorry mate. I've got a pretty simple philosophy. If there's work I work, if nobody interferes with me then I interfere with nobody."

Another way of seeing the Removalist is that he is the only character within the play to be morally good. Everyone else portrayed has a problem and very flawed persona. Simmons is a crooked cop, Ross is too innocent and therefore doesn't know the truth of world. Kate is promiscuous, Kenny is abusive, and Fiona is insecure and unable to decide for herself. The Removalist is what someone should be, a worker, doesn't retaliate, is polite, and doesn't have any depicted bad habits or crooked character traits. He only does what he is meant to do, and is lets the people who do their job do their job.

== Issues ==
The play deals with a lot of issues/themes/concerns and expresses these through the 'new age theatre' that David Williamson engages his audiences through. For the first time Australians were seeing themselves on stage. Symbolically David Williamson explores Australian society through the characters, themes and concerns. For example, "The Removalist" represents the everyman who 'sits on the fence'. The use of the 'police force' is interesting too – it is a blackly humorous pun, given the force and violence that the two police characters use.

Violence is a constant theme throughout the play. Words such as 'fuck', 'shit' and 'cunt' are provocative and confronting but also true of the 'ocker' language and mannerisms that Kenny, Ross and Simmonds embody.

== Background ==
The play is set in 1971 – a turbulent time in Australian history and society. In 1956, Melbourne hosted the Olympic Games, and television was launched in Australia. Both these events meant Australians began to see more of the world, and had a different picture of their place in it. In 1962, changes were made enabling the indigenous Aboriginal population to vote. In the same year, the Vietnam War began, which led to an increasing Australian involvement, including the introduction of National service (1964.) In 1964, The Beatles toured Australia. Young girls went crazy, and society changed forever. In 1966, the Australian Labor Party dropped the White Australia policy as part of its platform. 1969 saw men walk on the Moon, and Australian women getting the right to equal pay. In the late 1960s and into the early 1970s, Australian Society was getting more publicly vocal – women's right, indigenous rights, protesting against the Vietnam War, etc. With a string of public trials against corruption in the police force, The Removalists is an examination of Australian society at one of its most turbulent times.

David Williamson aimed to create an Australian identity in international drama. The Removalists uses generic characters to which the Australian audience can relate. Williamson used familiar issues in his society such as corruption and violence in the police force and reflected them in The Removalists.

Williamson was inspired to write the play by a story told to him by a removalist. He later said, "the play was actually a very black satire on the very worst aspects of Australian macho, male behaviour, which the audiences, interestingly, read straight away. Audiences are far more intelligent (sorry) than critics. They read what's actually happening there in front of them on the stage, whereas those occasional critics who view life through an ideological framework, they interpreted the play to be a searing attack on police brutality, which it never was."

Williamson himself appeared in the La Mama production as the removalist alongside Kristin Green. Both wound up leaving their spouses for each other.

== Feature film ==
The play was turned into a 1975 Australian film. It was John Hargreaves’ first role in a feature film and the first film as director for Tom Jeffrey and producer for Margaret Fink. It was the final film shot at Sydney's Ajax Studios.
