= Melinda Doring =

Melinda Doring is an Australian production designer and former costume designer. She has won the AACTA Award for Best Production Design four times and been nominated twice more.

== Career ==
In reviews of Home Song Stories (2007), Variety called the production "ace", and The Hollywood Reporter described it as "first-rate". In an otherwise mixed review, The Sydney Morning Herald praised Doring's production design in Triangle (2009). The Hollywood Reporter wrote that her production design in The Eye of the Storm "evokes a world of chauffeured Bentleys and kangaroo-fur stoles inhabited by a wannabe colonial aristocracy".

== Awards ==
Year	Organization	Award	Film	Result	Ref
2004	AACTA Awards	Best Production Design	Somersault	Won	
2005	AACTA Awards	Best Costume Design	Little Fish	Nominated	
2006	AACTA Awards	Best Production Design	Suburban Mayhem	Nominated	
2007	AACTA Awards	Best Production Design	The Home Song Stories	Won	
2007	Golden Horse Awards	Best Art Direction	The Home Song Stories	Nominated	
2007	Inside Film Awards	Best Production Design	The Home Song Stories	Won	
2011	Inside Film Awards	Best Production Design	Oranges and Sunshine	Won	
2012	AACTA Awards	Best Production Design	The Eye of the Storm	Won	
2013	AACTA Awards	Best Production Design	The Sapphires	Won	
2020	AACTA Awards	Best Production Design in Television	Stateless	Won	
2024	AACTA Awards	Best Production Design in Television	The Lost Flowers of Alice Hart	Won	

Prior to 2012, the AACTA Awards were known as the AFI Awards.

== Filmography ==
Year	Title	Production designer	Costume designer
2000	City of Dreams	Yes	Yes
2001	Mullet	No	Yes
2002	Walking on Water	No	Yes
2004	Somersault	Yes	No
2005	Little Fish	No	No
2005	Jewboy	Yes	No
2006	Suburban Mayhem	No	Yes
2006	The Silence	Yes	No
2007	Home Song Stories	Yes	No
2008	Maverick Mother	Yes	Yes
2008	$9.99	Yes	No
2009	Triangle	Yes	No
2009	The Boys Are Back	Yes	No
2010	Oranges and Sunshine	Yes	No
2011	The Eye of the Storm	Yes	No
2012	The Sapphires	Yes	No
2012	Underground: The Julian Assange Story	Yes	No
2013	Tracks	Yes	No
2015	Strangerland	Yes	No
