= Norma Moriceau =

- Born: 15 April 1944; New South Wales, Australia
- Died: 21 August 2016 (aged 72); Sydney, Australia
- Occupations: Costume designer, art director
- Notable work: Mad Max 2, Mad Max Beyond Thunderdome

Norma Moriceau (15 April 1944 – 21 August 2016) was an Australian costume designer and production designer. She was best known for the post-apocalyptic leather-fetish biker warrior costumes she designed for Mad Max 2 (1981) and Mad Max Beyond Thunderdome (1985).

== Career ==
=== Late 1970s and early 1980s ===
In the late 1970s, Moriceau wrote the screenplay for Galaxy's Last Tape (1977). Her career in costume design started during this same period, with Journey Among Women (1977) and Newsfront (1978). In the early 1980s, Moriceau did costume design for several films with a 'punk'-oriented look, including the Sex Pistols' film The Great Rock 'n' Roll Swindle (1980), Mad Max 2 (1981) (which was released as The Road Warrior in the US), and Mad Max Beyond Thunderdome (1985).

Other films she did costume design on in the early 1980s include the children's "Little Rascals" style film Fatty Finn (1980), The Chain Reaction (1980) (also called Nuclear Run), and Nate and Hayes (1983) (also called Savage Islands in the UK).

Moriceau has won three Australian Film Institute Awards for the best costume-design, for Newsfront, Fatty Finn and Mad Max 2.

=== Mid-1980s and later ===
In the mid-1980s, Moriceau did the costume design for the big Australian hit film Crocodile Dundee (1986), and then its sequel Crocodile Dundee II (1988). She followed up with action movies and thrillers including Dead Calm (1989), The Punisher (1989), and Patriot Games (1992). Other 1990s costume design jobs included Wide Sargasso Sea (1993), No Escape (1994), The Island of Dr. Moreau (1996), and Babe: Pig in the City.

In 1998, she did a television project called Aufstieg und Fall der Stadt Mahagonny. In the 2000s, she did costume design for the Graham Greene adaptation The Quiet American (2002) and for the film Beyond Borders (2003).
