= Eleanor Witcombe =

Australian screenwriter

Eleanor Witcombe AM
- Eleanor Witcombe - Screenwriter and playwright
- Born: Eleanor Katrine Whitcombe; 20 September 1923; Yorketown, South Australia, Australia
- Died: 21 October 2018 (aged 95); Sydney, New South Wales, Australia
- Education: Brisbane Girls Grammar School; National Art School
- Occupations: Screenwriter, playwright
- Writing career
- Language: English
- Notable works: The Getting of Wisdom My Brilliant Career; The Mavis Bramston Show; Number 96
- Notable awards: AFI Award for Best Adapted Screenplay (1978); Member of the Order of Australia (2014)

Eleanor Katrine Witcombe AM (20 September 1923 – 21 October 2018) was an Australian screenwriter and playwright who worked extensively in radio, film and television.

== Early life and education ==
Witcombe was born in Yorketown, South Australia to Bertha Eriksen, who was of Danish and Prussian descent, and Noel Whitcombe. Her father ran a farm there, and later a grocery store. In 1939, the family drove to Queensland, intending to move to Cooktown, but ending up in Brisbane where Eleanor and her sister Aileen attended Brisbane Girls Grammar School. In 1941, Witcombe left school due to chronic asthma, and the family relocated to Sydney, where she attended the National Art School. She worked as a governess at a New South Wales property during World War II, but was unhappy in the role and dreamt of becoming a writer.

== Writing career ==
In 1947, Witcombe was awarded a scholarship at the Mercury Theatre founded by Peter Finch. The following year, the Mosman Theatre Club commissioned her to write three plays for children, which received national acclaim and began her writing career.

In 1952, she moved to England and worked at the BBC as a typist. Whilst in London, she managed to get her play, Smugglers Beware!, produced and performed at Toynbee Hall.

She returned to Australia, and began producing radio scripts for ABC radio, the Macquarie Network and Lux Radio Theatres. In the 1960s, she adapted Smugglers Beware! and the novel Pastures of the Blue Crane for ABC television, and was on the writing team for the sketch comedy series The Mavis Bramston Show on the Seven Network. She was also a founding member of the Australian Writers' Guild (AWG) in 1962.

In the early 1970s, Witcombe adapted two of Norman Lindsay's works: The Magic Pudding for a marionette stage show, and Redheap for television, which resulted in a lifelong friendship with Lindsay's daughter, Jane Glad. She then joined the writing team for the soap opera Number 96. In 1973, she adapted Ethel Turner's Seven Little Australians for ABC television.

In the late 1970s, Witcombe adapted two novels into film scripts which became part of the Australian film renaissance at the time: The Getting of Wisdom directed by Bruce Beresford, and My Brilliant Career directed by Gillian Armstrong.

== Select credits ==
- Smugglers Beware (1963 TV drama)
- The Mavis Bramston Show
- Seven Little Australians (mini series)
- Number 96
- The Getting of Wisdom (1977)
- My Brilliant Career (1979)
- Water Under the Bridge (1980)
- Jonah (1982)
- The Harp in the South (1987)

== Awards and honours ==
Witcombe won the AFI Award for Best Adapted Screenplay in 1978 for The Getting of Wisdom and in 1979 for My Brilliant Career.

In the 2014 Queen's Birthday Honours, Witcombe was made a Member of the Order of Australia for significant service to the arts as a writer for radio, film, television and theatre.
