= Margaret Fink =

Australian film producer

Margaret Elliot AO
- Born: 3 March 1933 (age 93)
- Occupation: Film producer

Margaret Fink AO (born Margaret Elliott on 3 March 1933) is an Australian film and television producer, noted for her important role in the revival of Australian cinema in the early 1970s.

== Biography ==
Fink was educated at Sydney Girls' High School, East Sydney Technical College, Sydney Teachers College and the Sydney Conservatorium. She worked as an art teacher at various high schools in Sydney from 1956 to 1962. Her sister Elizabeth is a historian who married fellow historian Keith Windschuttle.

Her productions include The Removalists (1975), My Brilliant Career (1979), For Love Alone (1986), Edens Lost (1988) (for TV), and Candy (2006).

She was part of the Sydney Push, a libertarian group of the 1950s and 1960s that included Lillian Roxon, Germaine Greer, Clive James, Robert Hughes and Frank Moorhouse. While still known as Margaret Elliott, she published Harry Hooton's last book, It Is Great To Be Alive. In 1961 she married Leon Fink, a renowned restaurateur, philanthropist and property developer. They have three children together: Hannah, John and Ben. She has also had relationships with Barry Humphries, Jim McNeil and Bill Harding. Her daughter, Hannah Fink, is a writer. John Fink is a restaurateur and filmmaker. Ben Fink is a musician. He was the lead vocalist/guitarist and songwriter of funk band King Clam, and a member of the band The Whitlams.

Fink was appointed an Officer of the Order of Australia in the 2024 Australia Day Honours for "distinguished service to the arts as a film and television producer, and as a supporter of the visual arts community".
