= Money Movers =

- Theatrical poster
- Directed by: Bruce Beresford
- Screenplay by: Bruce Beresford
- Based on: The Money Movers by Devon Minchin
- Produced by: Matt Carroll
- Starring: Terence Donovan; Tony Bonner; Ed Devereaux; Charles 'Bud' Tingwell; Candy Raymond; Jeanie Drynan; Bryan Brown; Lucky Grills
- Cinematography: Don McAlpine
- Edited by: William M. Anderson
- Production company: South Australian Film Corporation
- Distributed by: Roadshow Entertainment
- Release date: 1978
- Running time: 92 minutes
- Country: Australia
- Language: English
- Budget: A$536,861
- Box office: A$330,000 (Australia)

Money Movers is a 1978 Australian crime action drama film written and directed by Bruce Beresford. The film was based on the 1972 novel The Money Movers by Devon Minchin, founder of Metropolitan Security Services. The story deals loosely with two real-life events, the 1970 Sydney Armoured Car Robbery where A$500,000 was stolen from a Mayne Nickless armoured van, and a 1970 incident when A$280,000 was stolen from Metropolitan Security Services' offices by bandits impersonating policemen.

Money Movers is "one of the few films of the 1970s that deal with crime and police corruption as an entrenched state of being, and one of the earliest to embrace extremely violent action."

== Plot ==
An armoured payroll truck owned by Darcy's Security Services is robbed and the driver, ex-policeman Dick Martin, is removed from armoured cars and put onto night patrols. The robbers are double-crossed by crime boss Jack Henderson, whose henchman Dino kills all the robbers.

Lionel Darcy, head of the company, suspects a major robbery is being planned but is unaware that all the culprits are employed by the company. He asks former employee Mindel Seagers to look into newcomer to the firm Leo Bassett. Jack Henderson discovers that a robbery is being planned by Eric Jackson, a former speedway driver and a Senior Supervisor with Darcy's, his brother Brian Jackson who also works as a guard for Darcy's as an armoured truck driver, and Ed Gallagher, the supervisor of Darcy's counting house. When Eric Jackson breaks into Bassett's apartment, Henderson's men kidnap him and cut off the little toe on his left foot with a pair of bolt cutters in their attempt to force him to work for him.

Dick Martin and Leo Bassett foil the planned robbery after which Martin is taken to hospital suffering gunshot wounds while Bassett reveals to Lionel Darcy (who was found out through Seagers to be working undercover as a guard on behalf of Darcy's insurance company Legal & United) that it was he who has sent a threatening note warning that robbery of Darcy's money counting house was to be the ruse used to flush out any real robbers. When Lionel Darcy protests that Legal & United could have informed him of their plans, Bassett reveals that Lionel Darcy was actually their chief suspect.

== Cast ==
- Terence Donovan as Eric Jackson
- Tony Bonner as Leo Bassett
- Ed Devereaux as Dick Martin
- Charles 'Bud' Tingwell as Jack Henderson
- Candy Raymond as Mindel Seagers
- Jeanie Drynan as Dawn Jackson
- Bryan Brown as Brian Jackson
- Alan Cassell as Detective-Sergeant Sammy Ross
- Gary Files as Ernest Sainsbury
- Ray Marshall as Ed Gallagher
- Hu Pryce as David Griffiths
- Lucky Grills as Robert Conway
- Frank Wilson as Lionel Darcy
- Terry Camilleri as Dino
- Edwin Hodgeman as Nacker
- Stuart Littlemore as himself (television reporter)

== Production ==
After making The Getting of Wisdom Bruce Beresford signed a contract with the South Australian Film Corporation (SAFC) to make two films in two years. He wanted to make a movie that was in complete contrast with his last movie, and had written a script called The Ferryman. However the SAFC did not want to make it and they offered him a number of other projects instead. Beresford decided to adapt a novel by Devon Minchin, who founded Metropolitan Security Services in 1954. Beresford worked with MSS for two months doing research.

Shooting took six weeks in February and March 1978. Although the film was based in Sydney, it was shot mostly in the studios of the SAFC and at various locations in Adelaide, notably the Rowley Park Speedway, with some scenes also filmed in Sydney. This is seen with vehicles regularly jumping between South Australia's black on a white background licence plates and the NSW version of black on yellow. It was also noticeable when the opening sequence to the film shows an armoured van passing known landmarks in each city such as Circular Quay in Sydney and Port Road in Adelaide.

Although fake money was used in the film, where there was calls for large amounts of cash, (approximately A$1 million was used) real armed guards from Metropolitan Security Services (MSS) were on hand.

== Release ==
The film, when it was released in 1979, failed badly at the box office, taking $330,000 which was some $206,861 less than the film's budget. Beresford:

Nobody went to see it. I went on the opening night in Melbourne and there were three people there and me. I was sitting up the back wondering what time the session started and then the film came on. I thought, 'this is going to be a disaster'. And it was.

20/20 Filmsight said the film is "often let down by stagy performances, uneven editing and a poor script", but is "worth checking out."

Movie News said Money Movers "delivers an intriguing plot and hair-raising suspense with incredible pace and ferocity."

Australian Screen said that "Money Movers was ahead of its time, and may have suffered because of that. The film opened early in 1979, and failed badly, but it was not alone – 1979 was the worst year for Australian films, in box-office terms, since the new wave of Australian cinema had begun."

The movie has since gained something of a cult following among speedway fans in Australia largely thanks to the footage of the much-loved Rowley Park which closed just 13 months after filming was completed.

Filmink argued the movie was "one of the best Australian crime films ever made... unpretentious, stripped back, moves like a freight train, juggles several plots and a wide galaxy of characters with incredible skill, and is superbly acted from the biggest part to the smallest."

== Accolades ==
Award	Category	Subject	Result
AACTA Awards (1979 AFI Awards)	Best Adapted Screenplay	Bruce Beresford	Nominated
AACTA Awards (1979 AFI Awards)	Best Editing	William M. Anderson	Nominated
AACTA Awards (1979 AFI Awards)	Best Production Design	David Copping	Nominated

=== Box office ===
Money Movers grossed $330,000 at the box office in Australia, which is equivalent to $1,290,300 in 2009 dollars.

=== Home media ===
Money Movers was released for the first time on DVD by Umbrella Entertainment in March 2018.

Title	Format	Episodes	Discs/Tapes	Region 4 (Australia)	Special features	Distributors
Money Movers	DVD	Film	1	7 March 2018	A making-of featurette with Cast and Crew Theatrical trailer	Umbrella Entertainment
Money Movers	Streaming	Film	Vimeo.com	7 March 2018	None	Umbrella Entertainment

== See also ==
- Cinema of Australia
- South Australian Film Corporation
