= Roger Ford (production designer) =

Screen production designer

- Occupation: Screen production designer
- Years active: 1969-present

Roger Ford is a film and television production designer.

== Career ==
He is represented by over forty film and television credits on his module in the Internet Movie Database. Ford was nominated for an Academy Award for Best Art Direction for the film Babe (1995).

=== Filmography and television work ===
| Year | Title | Genre | Notes |
|---|---|---|---|
| 1971 | Doctor Who | Sci-Fi | |
| 1995 | Babe | Comedy, Drama | Also Costume Designer |
| 1998 | Babe: Pig in the City | Comedy, Drama | |
| 2002 | Rabbit-Proof Fence | Drama | |
| 2003 | Peter Pan (2003 film) | Fantasy, Adventure | |
| 2005 | The Chronicles of Narnia: The Lion, the Witch and the Wardrobe | Fantasy, Adventure | |
| 2008 | The Chronicles of Narnia: Prince Caspian | Fantasy, Adventure | |
