= The Night the Prowler =

1978 Australian film

- Cover of screenplay
- Directed by: Jim Sharman
- Written by: Patrick White
- Produced by: Anthony Buckley
- Starring: Ruth Cracknell; John Frawley; Kerry Walker; John Derum; Maggie Kirkpatrick; Terry Camilleri
- Cinematography: David Sanderson
- Edited by: Sara Bennett
- Music by: Cameron Allan
- Production companies: Chariot Films; New South Wales Film Corporation
- Distributed by: International Harmony (US)
- Release dates: 2 June 1978 (Sydney Film Festival); 15 June 1979 (Australia)
- Running time: 90 minutes
- Country: Australia
- Language: English
- Budget: AU$417,000

The Night the Prowler (also known as Patrick White's The Night the Prowler) is a 1978 Australian film written by Patrick White, produced by Anthony Buckley and directed by Jim Sharman. Ruth Cracknell was nominated in 1979 for an AFI Award for Best Actress in a Lead Role for her part at the 1979 Australian Film Institute Awards.

== Plot ==
Felicity Bannister is a young girl living in the wealthy Sydney suburbs where her controlling mother Doris is arranging her engagement to an older man, John, who works in foreign affairs. After enduring a terrible sixteenth birthday party, Felicity calls off the engagement.

As a way of rebelling against Doris, Felicity roams the streets of Sydney at night, dressed in leather, and has a fantasy about being molested by a house burglar prowler. Felicity turns into a prowler herself, burglarizing men’s homes at night and learning to enjoy the underbelly of society.

== Cast ==
- Ruth Cracknell as Doris Bannister
- John Frawley as Humphrey Bannister
- Kerry Walker as Felicity Bannister
- John Derum as John
- Maggie Kirkpatrick as Madge Hopkirk
- Terry Camilleri as The Prowler
- Harry Neilson as Old man
- Alexander Archdale

== Production ==
Jim Sharman had worked successfully with Patrick White directing the latter's play The Season at Sarsaparilla. White suggested that his book The Night the Prowler might make a film; Sharman agreed and White wrote a screenplay.

The film was shot in November and December 1977.

== Release ==
The film was selected to open the 1978 Sydney Film Festival and was harshly received.

== Reception ==
Paul Byrnes of Australian Screen Online wrote the following in his review:

The film is a savage satire on the neuroses of the privileged of Sydney’s eastern suburbs, where White lived, and the director Jim Sharman grew up. Much of the satire verges on invective, and the film was criticised for being ponderous, pretentious and condescending. Parts of it are like that—especially some of the dialogue—but the film also has some moments where everything works.
