= The Getting of Wisdom (film) =

- Directed by: Bruce Beresford
- Written by: Eleanor Witcombe
- Based on: The Getting of Wisdom by Henry Handel Richardson
- Produced by: Phillip Adams
- Starring: Susannah Fowle; Hilary Ryan; Barry Humphries
- Cinematography: Donald McAlpine
- Edited by: William M. Anderson
- Production company: Southern Cross Films
- Distributed by: Roadshow
- Release date: 5 August 1977
- Running time: 101 minutes
- Country: Australia
- Language: English
- Budget: A$525,000 or $500,000
- Box office: A$982,000

The Getting of Wisdom is a 1977 Australian film directed by Bruce Beresford and based on the 1910 novel of the same title by Henry Handel Richardson. It is regarded as being part of the Australian New Wave of cinema.

The film is set in 1890s Victoria, when Laura (Susannah Fowle) enters an exclusive Melbourne ladies' college based on Presbyterian Ladies' College. The film follows her struggle for acceptance, conformity, romance, friendship and achievement over the next four years. Lesbian overtones between a schoolgirl and a music teacher are made explicit in the film, more so than in Richardson's novel.

It also starred Barry Humphries, John Waters and Terence Donovan, and featured early career appearances by Kerry Armstrong, Sigrid Thornton, Noni Hazlehurst, Maggie Kirkpatrick and Julia Blake.

A musical theme runs through the story, with piano works by Beethoven, Schubert and Thalberg played by Sarah Grunstein.

== Plot ==
Laura Rambotham is sent to attend boarding school in Melbourne, Australia at the turn of the century. During her second year she tells everyone about a made-up romance between herself and the school's minister, Reverend Shepherd. She forms an attachment with an older student in her music class, Evelyn. When Evelyn leaves, Laura throws herself into her studies and wins the school literary and music prizes.

== Cast ==
- Susannah Fowle as Laura Tweedle Rambotham
- Hilary Ryan as Evelyn
- Terence Donovan as Tom McNamara
- Patricia Kennedy as Miss Chapman
- Sheila Helpmann as Mrs. Gurley
- Candy Raymond as Miss Zielinski
- Barry Humphries as Rev. Strachey
- John Waters as Rev. Shepherd
- Julia Blake as Isabella Shepherd
- Diana Greentree as Maisie Shepherd
- Monica Maughan as Miss Day
- Dorothy Bradley as Miss Hicks
- Kay Eklund as Mrs. Rambotham
- Maggie Kirkpatrick as Sarah
- Phillip Adams, cameo role as mathematics teacher
- Kerry Armstrong as Kate, one of the worldly-wise students
- Sigrid Thornton as Maria, one of the worldly-wise students
- Noni Hazelhurst
- Celia De Burgh as M.P.
- Kim Deacon as Lilith
- Alix Longman as Annie Johns, nicknamed Chinky
- Jo-Anne Moore as Tilly
- Amanda Ring as Cupid
- Janet Shaw as Bertha
- Karen Sutton as Pin, Laura's sister

== Production ==
Bruce Beresford wanted to make the film after The Adventures of Barry McKenzie (1972) and tried to get finance from Reg Grundy. Grundy said he would think about it if Beresford made a McKenzie sequel. Beresford made Barry McKenzie Holds His Own (1974) but Grundy declined to make Wisdom.

The film was the first production from the newly formed Victorian Film Corporation, which provided $100,000 with additional funding from the Australian Film Commission and the Nine Network. Six thousand girls were interviewed for the school pupil roles. It was shot at Methodist Ladies' College and in the town of Eddington in January and February 1977.

=== Production crew ===
- Bruce Beresford – Director
- Phillip Adams – Producer
- Michael Lake- Assistant Director
- Russel Karel – Production Manager
- Donald McAlpine – Director of Photography
- John Stoddart – Production Designer
- William Anderson- Editor
- Anna Senior – Costume Designer
- Desmond Bone-Sound Recording
- Gary Wilkins- Sound Recording
- Peter Fenton-Sound Mixing
- Moya Iceton – Continuity

=== Music ===
Sarah Grunstein commented on her approach to playing the piano works featured in the film: "I read the book, loved it, and tried to play like an adolescent girl whose performances reflected her experiences in new surroundings at a boarding school away from home."

== Release ==
The Getting of Wisdom was released in Australia on 5 August 1977 and on 3 August 1980 in the United States.

== Box office ==
The Getting of Wisdom grossed $982,000 at the box office in Australia, which is equivalent to $7,013,600 in 2026 dollars.

== Reception ==
Richard Freedman of The Star-Ledger called it a "quietly powerful film" which is "superbly acted by all involved, and directed with the utmost sensitivity." Freedman also noted that the film "is slow-paced, in the Australian fashion, but for all its hermetic Victorian atmosphere it packs more authentic emotional punch than many a flashier, splashier movie."

John Furcolow of the Lexington Herald-Leader wrote: "The Getting of Wisdom is another in what has fast become a long line of high-quality films from Australia that have appeared in this country the last three or four years ... The result is not a great film, but a good solid piece of dramatic entertainment. The newness and the fresh point of view of Australian films has begun to wear off, leaving these stories standing on their own as films. The Getting of Wisdom is on sturdy ground indeed."

== Awards ==
The Getting of Wisdom was nominated for five AFI Awards in 1978 and won in the Best Adapted Screenplay (Eleanor Witcombe) category.

== See also ==
- Cinema of Australia
