= List of awards and nominations received by Judy Davis =

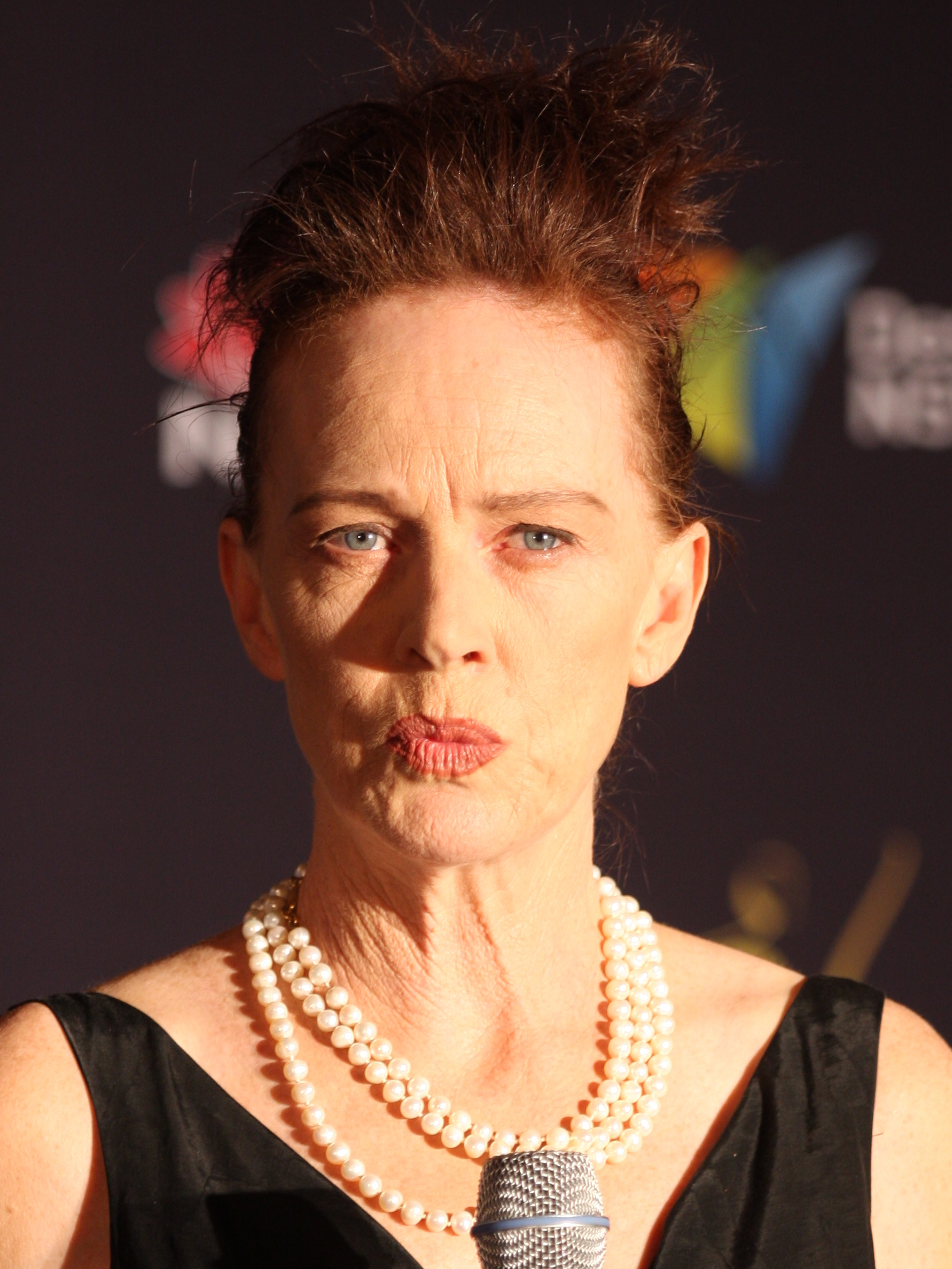
Davis at the AACTA Awards, 2012

Judy Davis is an Australian actress known for her roles on stage and screen. She has received eight AACTA Awards, two BAFTA Awards, two Golden Globe Awards, three Primetime Emmy Awards, and one Screen Actors Guild Award as well as nominations for two Academy Awards.

Davis first came to critical acclaim for her role as a young country girl in the period film My Brilliant Career (1979), for which she won BAFTA Awards for both Best Actress and Most Promising Newcomer. She earned further acclaim in 1984, when she was nominated for the Academy Award for Best Actress for her performance as Adela Quested in the historical epic A Passage to India. Davis's first major American feature in Woody Allen drama Husbands and Wives (1992), saw her nominated for numerous awards for her role as woman trying to find love. She won a National Board of Review award for Best Supporting Actress, and was nominated for the Academy Award and Golden Globe Award for Best Supporting Actress, the BAFTA for Best Actress.

Davis won three Primetime Emmy Awards, her first for Outstanding Supporting Actress in a Limited Series or Movie for her performances as Diane Divelbess in the NBC television film Serving in Silence: The Margarethe Cammermeyer Story (1995). For her portrayal of Judy Garland in the television miniseries Life with Judy Garland: Me and My Shadows (2001) garnered her further acclaim, including the Primetime Emmy Award for Outstanding Lead Actress in a Limited Series or Movie as well as an American Film Institute Award, a Golden Globe Award, and Screen Actors Guild Award. For her performance as an alcoholic socialite in the miniseries The Starter Wife (2007) she won a third Primetime Emmy Award.

Davis is the most nominated and winning actress in AACTA Award for Leading Actress, with nine nominations, including six win.

== Major associations ==
=== Academy Awards ===
Year	Category	Nominated work	Result	Ref.
1984	Best Actress	A Passage to India	Nominated	
1992	Best Supporting Actress	Husbands and Wives	Nominated	

=== BAFTA Awards ===
Year	Category	Nominated work	Result	Ref.
British Academy Film Awards
1980	Most Promising Newcomer	My Brilliant Career	Won	
1980	Best Actress in a Leading Role	My Brilliant Career	Won	
1992	Best Actress in a Leading Role	Husbands and Wives	Nominated	

=== Emmy Awards ===
Year	Category	Nominated work	Result	Ref.
Primetime Emmy Awards
1982	Outstanding Supporting Actress – Miniseries or a Movie	A Woman Called Golda	Nominated	
1991	Outstanding Lead Actress – Miniseries or a Movie	One Against the Wind	Nominated	
1995	Outstanding Supporting Actress – Miniseries or a Movie	Serving in Silence: The Margarethe Cammermeyer Story	Won	
1998	Outstanding Lead Actress – Miniseries or a Movie	The Echo of Thunder	Nominated	
1999	Outstanding Lead Actress – Miniseries or a Movie	Dash and Lilly	Nominated	
2000	Outstanding Lead Actress – Miniseries or a Movie	A Cooler Climate	Nominated	
2001	Outstanding Lead Actress – Miniseries or a Movie	Life with Judy Garland: Me and My Shadows	Won	
2003	Outstanding Lead Actress – Miniseries or a Movie	The Reagans	Nominated	
2006	Outstanding Lead Actress – Miniseries or a Movie	A Little Thing Called Murder	Nominated	
2007	Outstanding Supporting Actress – Miniseries or a Movie	The Starter Wife	Won	
2012	Outstanding Supporting Actress – Miniseries or a Movie	Page Eight	Nominated	
2017	Outstanding Supporting Actress – Limited Series or a Movie	Feud: Bette and Joan	Nominated	

=== Golden Globe Awards ===
Year	Category	Nominated work	Result	Ref.
1991	Best Actress – Miniseries or Television Film	One Against the Wind	Won	
1992	Best Supporting Actress – Motion Picture	Husbands and Wives	Nominated	
1995	Best Supporting Actress – Television	Serving in Silence: The Margarethe Cammermeyer Story	Nominated	
1999	Best Actress – Miniseries or Television Film	Dash and Lilly	Nominated	
2001	Best Actress – Miniseries or Television Film	Life with Judy Garland: Me and My Shadows	Won	
2003	Best Actress – Miniseries or Television Film	The Reagans	Nominated	

=== Laurence Olivier Awards ===
Year	Category	Nominated work	Result
1982	Actress of the Year in a New Play	Insignificance	Nominated

=== Screen Actors Guild Awards ===
Year	Category	Nominated work	Result	Ref.
1999	Outstanding Actress in a Miniseries or Television Movie	A Cooler Climate	Nominated	
2001	Outstanding Actress in a Miniseries or Television Movie	Life with Judy Garland: Me and My Shadows	Won	

== Miscellaneous awards ==
Organizations	Year	Category	Work	Result	Ref.
AACTA Awards	1979	Best Actress in a Leading Role	My Brilliant Career	Nominated	
AACTA Awards	1981	Best Actress in a Leading Role	Winter of Our Dreams	Won	
AACTA Awards	1981	Best Actress in a Supporting Role	Hoodwink	Won	
AACTA Awards	1986	Best Actress in a Leading Role	Kangaroo	Won	
AACTA Awards	1987	Best Actress in a Leading Role	High Tide	Won	
AACTA Awards	1989	Best Actress in a Leading Role	Georgia	Nominated	
AACTA Awards	1993	Best Actress in a Supporting Role	On My Own	Won	
AACTA Awards	1996	Best Actress in a Leading Role	Children of the Revolution	Won	
AACTA Awards	2002	Best Actress in a Leading Role	Swimming Upstream	Nominated	
AACTA Awards	2008	Best International Actress	The Starter Wife	Nominated	
AACTA Awards	2012	Best Actress in a Leading Role	The Eye of the Storm	Won	
AACTA Awards	2015	Best Actress in a Supporting Role	The Dressmaker	Won	
AACTA Awards	2018	Best Lead Actress in a Television Drama	Mystery Road	Nominated	
AACTA Awards	2021	Best Actress in a Leading Role	Nitram	Won	
AACTA International Awards	2016	Best Supporting Actress	The Dressmaker	Nominated	
American Film Institute	2001	Actor of the Year – Female – Movie or Mini-Series	Life with Judy Garland: Me and My Shadows	Won	
Asia Pacific Screen Awards	2011	Best Actress	The Eye of the Storm	Nominated	
Blockbuster Entertainment Awards	1997	Favorite Supporting Actress – Suspense	Absolute Power	Nominated	
Gemini Awards	2009	Best Leading Actress in a Miniseries	Diamonds	Nominated	
Genie Awards	1991	Best Actress in a Supporting Role	On My Own	Nominated	
Gracie Awards	2007	Outstanding Supporting Actress – Mini-Series	The Starter Wife	Won	
Independent Spirit Awards	1991	Best Female Lead	Impromptu	Won	
Inside Film Awards	2003	Best Actress	Swimming Upstream	Nominated	
Inside Film Awards	2011	Best Actress	The Eye of the Storm	Nominated	
Moscow International Film Festival	1981	Best Actress	Winter of Our Dreams	Won	
National Board of Review	1992	Best Supporting Actress	Husbands and Wives	Won	
Prism Awards	2007	Best Performance in a TV Movie or Miniseries	The Starter Wife	Nominated	
Satellite Awards	2001	Best Actress – Miniseries or Television Film	Life with Judy Garland: Me and My Shadows	Won	
Satellite Awards	2006	Best Actress – Miniseries or Television Film	A Little Thing Called Murder	Won	
Satellite Awards	2007	Best Supporting Actress – Television	The Starter Wife	Nominated	
Satellite Awards	2009	Best Actress – Miniseries or Television Film	Diamonds	Nominated	
Satellite Awards	2017	Best Supporting Actress – Television	Feud	Nominated	

== Critics associations ==
Year	Association	Category	Nominated work	Result	Ref.
1984	Boston Society of Film Critics	Best Actress	A Passage to India	Won	
1987	National Society of Film Critics	Best Actress	High Tide	Won	
1991	London Film Critics' Circle	Best Actress	Barton Fink	Won	
1991	New York Film Critics Circle	Best Supporting Actress	Barton Fink	Won	
1991	Boston Society of Film Critics	Best Supporting Actress	Where Angels Fear to Tread	Won	
1991	London Film Critics' Circle	Best Actress	Naked Lunch	Won	
1991	National Society of Film Critics	Best Supporting Actress	Naked Lunch	Nominated	
1991	New York Film Critics Circle	Best Supporting Actress	Naked Lunch	Won	
1992	Boston Society of Film Critics	Best Supporting Actress	Husbands and Wives	Won	
1992	Chicago Film Critics Association	Best Supporting Actress	Husbands and Wives	Won	
1992	Kansas City Film Critics Circle	Best Supporting Actress	Husbands and Wives	Won	
1992	London Film Critics Circle	Best Actress	Husbands and Wives	Won	
1992	Los Angeles Film Critics Association	Best Supporting Actress	Husbands and Wives	Won	
1992	National Society of Film Critics	Best Supporting Actress	Husbands and Wives	Won	
1992	New York Film Critics Circle	Best Supporting Actress	Husbands and Wives	Nominated	
1992	Southeastern Film Critics Association	Best Supporting Actress	Husbands and Wives	Won	
1996	Film Critics Circle of Australia	Best Actor – Female	Children of the Revolution	Won	
2001	Broadcast Film Critics Association	Best Actress in a Picture Made for Television	Life with Judy Garland: Me and My Shadows	Won	
2003	Film Critics Circle of Australia	Best Supporting Actor – Female	Swimming Upstream	Won	
2011	Film Critics Circle of Australia	Best Actress – Leading Role	The Eye of the Storm	Nominated	
