= 11th AACTA Awards =

Australian film and television awards ceremony

- Sponsored by: Foxtel
- Date: 8 December 2021
- Location: Sydney Opera House, Sydney, Australia

Highlights
- Most nominations: The Newsreader
- Best Film: Nitram
- Best Drama Series: The Newsreader
- Best Comedy Series: Fisk

Television/radio coverage
- Networks
- Fox Arena; Network 10

The 11th Australian Academy of Cinema and Television Arts Awards (generally known as the AACTA Awards) is an awards ceremony to celebrate the best of Australian films and television of 2021. The main ceremony occurred on 8 December 2021 at the Sydney Opera House and was broadcast on Network 10 and Fox Arena, returning to Network 10 after a six year absence.

== Feature film ==
The nominations are as follows:

Best Film: Nitram – Nick Batzias, Virginia Whitwell, Justin Kurzel, Shaun Grant; The Dry – Bruna Papandrea, Jodi Matterson, Steve Hutensky, Rob Connolly, Eric Bana; The Furnace – Timothy White, Tenille Kennedy; High Ground – David Jowsey, Maggie Miles, Witiyana Marika, Greer Simpkin, Stephen Maxwell Johnson; Penguin Bloom – Bruna Papandrea, Steve Hutensky, Emma J Cooper, Naomi Watts, Jodi Matterson; Rams – Janelle Landers, Aidan O'Bryan	Best Direction: Justin Kurzel – Nitram; Rob Connolly – The Dry; Roderick MacKay – The Furnace; Stephen Maxwell Johnson – High Ground; Glendin Ivin – Penguin Bloom
Best Original Screenplay: Shaun Grant – Nitram; Monica Zanetti – Ellie and Abbie (& Ellie's Dead Aunt); Roderick MacKay – The Furnace; Chris Anastassiades – High Ground; JJ Winlove – June Again	Best Adapted Screenplay: Rob Connolly & Harry Cripps – The Dry; Shaun Grant & Harry Cripps – Penguin Bloom; Will Gluck & Patrick Burleigh – Peter Rabbit 2; James Duncan – Rams
Best Lead Actor: Caleb Landry Jones – Nitram; Simon Baker – High Ground; Eric Bana – The Dry; Ahmed Malek – The Furnace; Jacob Junior Nayinggul – High Ground	Best Lead Actress: Judy Davis – Nitram; Rose Byrne – Peter Rabbit 2; Noni Hazlehurst – June Again; Genevieve O'Reilly – The Dry; Naomi Watts – Penguin Bloom
Best Supporting Actor: Anthony LaPaglia – Nitram; Michael Caton – Rams; Baykali Ganambarr – The Furnace; Sean Mununggurr – High Ground; Jack Thompson – High Ground	Best Supporting Actress: Essie Davis – Nitram; Claudia Karvan – June Again; Esmerelda Marimowa – High Ground; Miranda Tapsell – The Dry; Jacki Weaver – Penguin Bloom
Best Cinematography: Stefan Duscio – The Dry; Andrew Commis – High Ground; Germain McMicking – Mortal Kombat; Germain McMicking – Nitram; Sam Chiplin – Penguin Bloom	Best Editing: Nick Fenton – Nitram; Nick Meyers & Alexandre de Franceschi – The Dry; James Vaughan – Friends and Strangers; Jill Bilcock, Karryn de Cinque & Hayley Miro Browne – High Ground; Matt Villa – Peter Rabbit 2
Best Original Music Score: Christopher Gordon – June Again; Peter Raeburn – The Dry; Jed Kurzel – Nitram; Marcelo Zarvos – Penguin Bloom; Antony Partos – Rams	Best Sound: Robert McKenzie, Steve Burgess & Phil Heywood – Mortal Kombat; Angus Robertson & Peter Purcell – Ascendent; Chris Goodes – The Dry; Steve Single, Dean Ryan & James Ashton – Nitram; Kevin O'Connell, Robert Mackenzie, Andy Wright & Ben Osmo – Peter Rabbit 2: The Runaway
Best Production Design: Naaman Marshall – Mortal Kombat; Jacinta Leong – 2067; Alice Babidge – Nitram; Annie Beauchamp – Penguin Bloom; Roger Ford – Peter Rabbit 2: The Runaway	Best Costume Design: Erin Roche – High Ground; Cappi Ireland – The Dry; Cappi Ireland – Mortal Kombat; Alice Babidge – Nitram; Tess Schofield – Rams
Best Indie Film: Ellie and Abbie (& Ellie's Dead Aunt) – Monica Zanetti, MahVeen Shahraki, Patrick James; Disclosure – Michael Bentham, Donna Lyon; Lone Wolf – Jonathan Ogilvie, Mat Govoni, Adam White, Lee Hubber; Moon Rock For Monday – Kurt Martin, Jim Robison, Agnieszka Switala, Aron Walker, David Bradley; My First Summer – Katie Found, Jonathan Auf Der Heide, Alisha Hnatjuk; Under My Skin – David O'Donnell, Raynen O'Keefe, Alex Russell, Rob Gibson

== Television ==
Best Drama Series: The Newsreader – Joanna Werner & Michael Lucas (ABC); Clickbait – Tony Ayres, Joanna Werner, Tom Hoffie & David Heyman (Netflix); Jack Irish – Ian Collie, Matt Cameron, Jo Rooney, Andrew Knight & Rob Gibson (ABC); Mr Inbetween – Michele Bennett (Foxtel); Total Control – Darren Dale, Rachel Griffiths, Stuart Page and Erin Bretherton (ABC); Wakefield – Kristen Dunphy, Sam Meikle, Jason Burrows, Chloe Rickard, Ally Henville, Shay Spencer & Alex Mitchell (ABC); Wentworth – Pino Amenta (Foxtel)	Best Miniseries or Telefeature: Fires – Tony Ayres, Andrea Denholm, Liz Watts, Belinda Chayko & Elisa Argenzio (ABC); A Sunburnt Christmas – Fiona Eagger, Deb Cox, Lisa Scott, Mike Jones, Drew Grove (Stan); The End – Rachel Gardner, Jamie Laurenson, Hakan Kousetta, Samantha Strauss, Emile Sherman, Iain Canning & Louise Smith (Foxtel); New Gold Mountain – Kylie du Fresne & Elisa Argenzio (SBS); The Unusual Suspects – Angie Fielder, Polly Staniford, Naomi Just & Vonne Patiag (SBS)
Best Narrative Comedy Series: Fisk – Vincent Sheehan (ABC); Aftertaste – Rebecca Summerton, Erik Thomson, Matthew Bate & Julie De Fina (ABC); Aunty Donna's Big Ol' House of Fun – Sam Lingham & Katherine Dale (Netflix); Frayed – Clelia Mountford, Sharon Horgan, Kevin Whyte & Nicole O’Donohue (ABC); Preppers – Liz Watts & Sylvia Warmer (ABC); Rosehaven – Andrew Walker, Celia Pacquola, Luke McGregor & Kevin Whyte (ABC)	Best Comedy Entertainment Program: Hard Quiz – Kevin Whyte, Chris Walker, Tom Gleeson & John Tabbagh (ABC); Dom and Adrian 2020 – Ian Collie, Rob Gibson & Julia Corcoran (Stan); The Moth Effect – Nick Boshier, Jazz Twemlow, Lauren Elliott, Jordana Johnson & Sophia Zachariou (Amazon Prime Video); Spicks and Specks – Nick Hayden, Rachel Millar & Anthony Watt (ABC); The Weekly – Kevin Whyte, Chris Walker, Charlie Pickering & Jo Long (ABC)
Best Entertainment Program: Sydney Gay and Lesbian Mardi Gras 2021 – Paul Clarke, Stephanie Werrett & Josh Martin (SBS); Australian Ninja Warrior – Margaret Bashfield, Jo Thatcher, Dave Forrester & Ashleigh Ryan (Nine Network); Lego Masters Australia – David McDonald & Di Yang (Nine Network); The Masked Singer – Sean Kneale & Karen Greene (Network Ten); Mastermind – Damian McDermott & Lucy De Luca (SBS); The Voice – Leigh Aramberri, Chloe Baker, Jaala Webster, Majella Wiemars & Beth Hart (Seven Network)	Best Factual Entertainment Program: Love on the Spectrum – Jenni Wilks, Karina Holden & Cian O'Clery (ABC); Australia Talks – Nick Hayden, Melina Wicks, Tom Whitty & Julie Hanna (ABC); Courtney Act's One Plus One – Courtney Act, Annie White, Jamie Cummins & Loni Cooper (ABC); Gogglebox Australia – David McDonald & Kerrie Kerr (Foxtel); The Project – Sarah Thornton & Christopher Bendall (Network Ten); You Can't Ask That – Frances O'Riordan, Kirk Docker & Josh Schmidt (ABC)
Best Lifestyle Program: Grand Designs Australia – Michael O'Neill & Brooke Bayvel (Foxtel); Adam and Poh's Malaysia in Australia – Adam Liaw & Mike Cardillo (SBS); The Cook Up with Adam Liaw – Olivia Hoopmann & Bruce Walters (SBS); Gardening Australia – Gill Lomas (ABC); The Living Room – Sarah Thornton, Ciaran Flannery, Nicole Rogers & Kate Witchard (Network Ten); Love It or List It Australia – Karen Warner, Geoff Fitzpatrick, Howard Myers & John Luscombe (Foxtel)	Best Reality Series: MasterChef Australia – Marty Benson, Adam Fergusson & Eoin Maher (Network Ten); The Amazing Race Australia – Sophia Mogford, Rikkie Proost, Evan Wilkes & Cathie Scott (Network Ten); Australian Survivor: Brains V Brawn – Keely Sonntag, Di Yang, Amelia Fisk & Adam Fergusson (Network Ten); The Block – David Barbour & Julian Cress (Nine Network); Luxe Listings Sydney – Paul Franklin, Chris Culvenor & Rikkie Proost (Amazon Prime Video); The Real Housewives of Melbourne – Pip Rubira, Neil Singh & Natalie Brosnan (Foxtel)
Best Children's Series: Bluey – Charlie Aspinwall, Joe Brumm, Daley Pearson & Sam Moor (ABC); 100% Wolf: Legend of the Moonstone – Barbara Stephen, Alexia Gates-Foale & Michael Bourchier (ABC); The Bureau of Magical Things – Jonathan M. Shiff & Stuart Wood (Network Ten); Dive Club – Steve Jaggi & Spencer McLaren (Network Ten); Hardball – Joe Weatherstone, Jan Stradling, Bernadette O'Mahony & Catherine Nebauer (ABC); Kangaroo Beach – Celine Goetz & Patrick Egerton (ABC)	Best Stand-Up Special: Hannah Gadsby: Douglas – Hannah Gadsby, Kevin Whyte, Kathleen McCarthy & John Irwin (Netflix); Anne Edmonds and Lloyd Langford: Business with Pleasure – Anne Edmonds, Lloyd Langford, Kevin Whyte, Kathleen McCarthy & Nikita Agzarian (Paramount+); Celia Pacquola: Let Me Know How It All Works Out – Celia Pacquola, Kevin Whyte, Kathleen McCarthy & Nikita Agzarian (Paramount+); Lano and Woodley in Lano and Woodley – Colin Lane, Frank Woodley, Kevin Whyte, Kathleen McCarthy & Nikita Agzarian (Paramount+); Rhys Nicholson Live at the Athenaeum – Rhys Nicholson, Thomas Toby Parkinson, Elia Eliades & Katherine Dale (Netflix); Tom Gleeson: Lighten Up – Tom Gleeson, Kevin Whyte, Kathleen McCarthy & Nikita Agzarian (Paramount+)
Best Lead Actor – Drama: Scott Ryan – Mr Inbetween; Rudi Dharmalingam – Wakefield; Guy Pearce – Jack Irish; Sam Reid – The Newsreader; Richard Roxburgh – Fires	Best Lead Actress – Drama: Anna Torv – The Newsreader; Deborah Mailman – Total Control; Mandy McElhinney – Wakefield; Miranda Otto – Fires; Pamela Rabe – Wentworth
Best Guest or Supporting Actor – Drama: William McInnes – The Newsreader; Harry Greenwood – Wakefield; Matt Nable – Mr Inbetween; Stephen Peacocke – The Newsreader; Justin Rosniak – Mr Inbetween	Best Guest or Supporting Actress – Drama: Rachel Griffiths – Total Control; Michelle Lim Davidson – The Newsreader; Marg Downey – The Newsreader; Harriet Dyer – Wakefield; Noni Hazlehurst – The End
Best Comedy Performer: Kitty Flanagan – Fisk; Mark Samual Bonanno – Aunty Donna's Big Ol' House of Fun; Tom Gleeson – Hard Quiz; Broden Kelly – Aunty Donna's Big Ol' House of Fun; Sarah Kendall – Frayed; Nakkiah Lui – Preppers; Luke McGregor – Rosehaven; Celia Pacquola – Rosehaven	Best Screenplay: Scott Ryan – Mr Inbetween – Episode 6: Ray Who?; Michael Lucas – The Newsreader – Episode 1: Three, Two, One...; Kim Ho & Michael Lucas – The Newsreader – Episode 5: No More Lies; Stuart Page – Total Control – Episode 1: Aftermath; Sam Meikle – Wakefield – Episode 5
Best Direction in a Drama or Comedy: Emma Freeman – The Newsreader – Episode 1: Three, Two, One...; Ana Kokkinos – Fires – Episode 2; Nash Edgerton – Mr Inbetween – Episode 6: Ray Who?; Kim Mordaunt – Wakefield – Episode 5; Jocelyn Moorhouse – Wakefield – Episode 8	Best Non-Fiction Television Direction: Cian O'Clery – Love on the Spectrum – Episode 4; Catherine Dwyer – Brazen Hussies; Madeleine Parry – Hannah Gadsby: Douglas; Stamatia Maroupas – Ms Represented with Annabel Crabb – Episode 1: Getting There; Kirk Docker – You Can't Ask That – Episode 1: Cheaters
Best Cinematography in Television: Bonnie Elliott – Fires – Episode 2: Everything's Gone; Dylan River – A Sunburnt Christmas; Garry Phillips – Bump – Episode 1: Sorpresa!; Marden Dean – Clickbait – Episode 6: Simon; Earle Dresner – The Newsreader – Episode 1: Three, Two, One...	Best Editing in Television: Mark Atkin – Fires – Episode 2: Everything's Gone; Rodrigo Balart – Clickbait – Episode 1: Five Million Hits; Angie Higgins – The Newsreader – Episode 5: No More Lies; Nicholas Holmes – Total Control – Episode 1: Aftermath; Gabriel Dowrick – Wakefield – Episode 8
Best Sound in Television: Emma Bortignon, Paul Pirola & Roger Van Wensveen – Fires – Episode 2: Everything's Gone; Emma Bortignon, Stephen Witherow, Nigel Croyden & John Wilkinson – Clickbait – Episode 1: Five Million Hits; Paul Finlay, Robert Sullivan, James Andrews & Dino Giacomin – Frayed – Episode 1; Nick Godkin – The Newsreader – Episode 1: Three, Two, One; Phil Keros, Stuart Waller, Andy Wright & Diego Ruiz – Total Control – Episode 1: Aftermath	Best Original Music Score in Television: Caitlin Yeo – New Gold Mountain – Episode 1: Propierty; Tom Armstrong – Aunty Donna's Big Ol' House of Fun – Episode 1: Housemates; Cornel Wilczek – Clickbait – Episode 1: Five Million Hits; Cornel Wilczek – Fires – Episode 2: Everything's Gone; Bryony Marks – Frayed – Episode 1
Best Production Design in Television: Melinda Doring – The Newsreader – Episode 1: Three, Two, One...; Jo Ford – Fires – Episode 2: Everything's Gone; Carrie Kennedy – Jack Irish – Episode 1; Ben Bangay – Ms Fisher's Modern Murder Mysteries – Episode 1: Death By Design; Paddy Reardon & Adele Flere – New Gold Mountain – Episode 1: Propierty	Best Costume Design in Television: Cappi Ireland – New Gold Mountain – Episode 1: Propierty; Tim Chappel – Dancing with the Stars – Episode 6; Cappi Ireland – Fires – Episode 2: Everything's Gone; Penny Dickinson – Ms Fisher's Modern Murder Mysteries – Episode 1: Difference by Design; Marion Boyce – The Newsreader – Episode 1: Three, Two, One...

== Documentary ==
Best Documentary: My Name Is Gulpilil – Molly Reynolds, Rolf de Heer, Peter Djigirr & David Gulpilil; Girls Can't Surf – Christopher Nelius & Michaela Perske; I'm Wanita – Matthew Walker, Carolina Sorensen, Clare Lewis & Tait Brady; Playing With Sharks – Sally Aitken & Bettina Dalton; Strong Female Lead – Tosca Looby & Karina Holden; When the Camera Stopped Rolling – Jane Castle & Pat Fiske	Best Documentary or Factual Television Program: Old People's Home for 4 Year Olds – Debbie Cuell & Bethan Arwel-Lewis (ABC); Brazen Hussies – Philippa Campey & Andrea Foxworthy (ABC); Exposed: The Ghost Train Fire – Caro Meldrum-Hanna, Jaya Balendra & Sue Spencer (ABC); Life in Colour with David Attenborough – Colette Beaudry & Carolyn Johnson (Nine Network); Ms Represented with Annabel Crabb – Frances O'Riordan, Annabel Crabb, Stamatia Maroupas, Geraldine Mckenna (ABC); The School That Tried to End Racism – Deborah Spinocchia & Johnny Lowry (ABC)
Best Editing in a Documentary: Tania Nehme – My Name is Gulpilil; Daniel Wieckmann – Freeman; Adrian Rostirolla – Playing with Sharks; Karen Johnson – Under the Volcano; Ray Thomas – When the Camera Stopped Rolling	Best Cinematography in a Documentary: Dylan River – The Beach – Episode 1: Too Mad Too Shy; Jim Frater – After The Night – Episode 1: The End of Innocence; Nathan Barlow – The Bowraville Murders; Bonnie Elliott – Freeman; Bonnie Elliott – Step into Paradise
Best Original Music Score in a Documentary: Caitlin Yeo – Playing with Sharks; James Henry – Freeman; Amanda Brown & Nick Wales – Step into Paradise; Megan Washington & Kristin Rule – The Beach – Episode 1: Too Mad Too Shy; Kyls Burtland – When the Camera Stopped Rolling	Best Sound in a Documentary: Wayne Pashley – Life in Colour with David Attenborough – Episode 1: Seeing in Colour; Richard Boxhall – The Bowraville Murders; Bryon Scullin – Freeman; Tom Heuzenroeder – My Name is Gulpilil; Sam Petty – When the Camera Stopped Rolling

== Short form and online ==
Best Short Form Drama: The Tailings – Liz Doran, Richard Kelly, Stephen Thomas, Stevie Cruz-Martin, Caitlin Richardson; Beautiful They – Cloudy Rhodes, Ella Millard; The Bends – Tom Campbell, Alexandra George, Adam Spellicy, Annie Thatcher; Dwarf Planet – Adrian Chiarella, Bec Janek; Grace – Darren McFarlane, Brian Patto, Aaron Farrugia, Christopher Gillingham; You and Me, Before and After – Madeleine Gottlieb, Liam Heyen, Cyna Strachan	Best Short Animation
Best Short Form Comedy: All My Friends Are Racist – Enoch Mailangi, Kodie Bedford, Bjorn Stewart, Liliana Munoz; A Life in Questions: Wisdom School with Aaron Chen – Aaron Chen, Henry Stone, Joshua Duncan; Celebration Nation – Molly Daniels, Jenny Zhou, Gaby Seow; Hug the Sun – Aaron McCann, Sam Lingham; Jimmy Rees – Jimmy Rees, David Gillett; Samantha Andrew – Samantha Andrew	Best Short Form Entertainment: Strong Women – Corinne Innes, Alexandra Gaulupeau, Ann Megalla, Patrick McCabe; Chopsticks or Fork? – Lin Jie Kong, Jennifer Wong, Rachel Robinson, Susan Lumsdon; Gourmet Lazy – Brendan Wan, Annie Thiele, Matthew Wood, Frances O'Riordan; Nat's What I Reckon – Nat's What I Reckon; Ozzy Man Reviews – Ethan Marrell; Woven Threads – Stories from Within – Paul Sullivan, Michi Marosszeky

== Additional awards ==
Best Visual Effects or Animation: Matt Middleton, Simon Pickard, Simon Whiteley, Jason Bath & Will Reichelt – Peter Rabbit 2; Jim Berney, Jake Morrison, J.D. Schwalm, Jamie Macdougall, Marla Henshaw & Malte Sarnes – Jungle Cruise; Chris Godfrey, Prue Fletcher, Avi Goodman & Nick Tripodi – Mortal Kombat; Dennis Jones, Dan Bethell, Chris Godfrey, Prue Fletcher & Peter Stubbs – Mortal Kombat; Nathan Ortiz, Damien Carr, Christopher Townsend & Josh Simmonds – Shang-Chi and the Legend of the Ten Rings	Best Hair and Makeup: Sheldon Wade – Australian Gangster; Nikki Gooley – Mortal Kombat; Lynn Wheeler – Ms Fisher's Modern Murder Mysteries; Cheryl Williams, Helen Magelaki & Ian Loughnan – New Gold Mountain; Fiona Rees-Jones – Nitram
Best Casting: Anousha Zarkesh – High Ground; Jane Norris – The Dry; Nathan Lloyd – The Newsreader; Nikki Barrett, Alison Telford & Kate Leonard – Nitram; Marianne Jade – Wakefield	Favourite Actor: Eric Bana – The Dry; Asher Keddie – Nine Perfect Strangers; Deborah Mailman – Total Control; Celia Pacquola – Rosehaven; Pamela Rabe – Wentworth
Favourite Competition Reality Show: Lego Masters Australia; Australian Survivor: Brains V Brawn; The Block; MasterChef Australia; The Voice	Favourite Digital Content Creator: Sooshi Mango; Sam Cotton; Millie Ford; Christian Hull; Jimmy Rees
Favourite Entertainment Show: Gardening Australia; Anh's Brush with Fame; Bondi Rescue; Gogglebox Australia; Have You Been Paying Attention?	Favourite Film: The Dry; A Sunburnt Christmas; Mortal Kombat; Penguin Bloom; Peter Rabbit 2: The Runaway
Favourite Television Drama: Wentworth; Clickbait; Home and Away; Jack Irish; RFDS	Favourite Television Host: Costa Georgiadis – Gardening Australia; Carrie Bickmore – The Project; Hamish Blake – Lego Masters Australia; Tom Gleeson – Hard Quiz; Adam Hills – Spicks and Specks
