= List of Judy Davis performances =

List

Judy Davis filmography
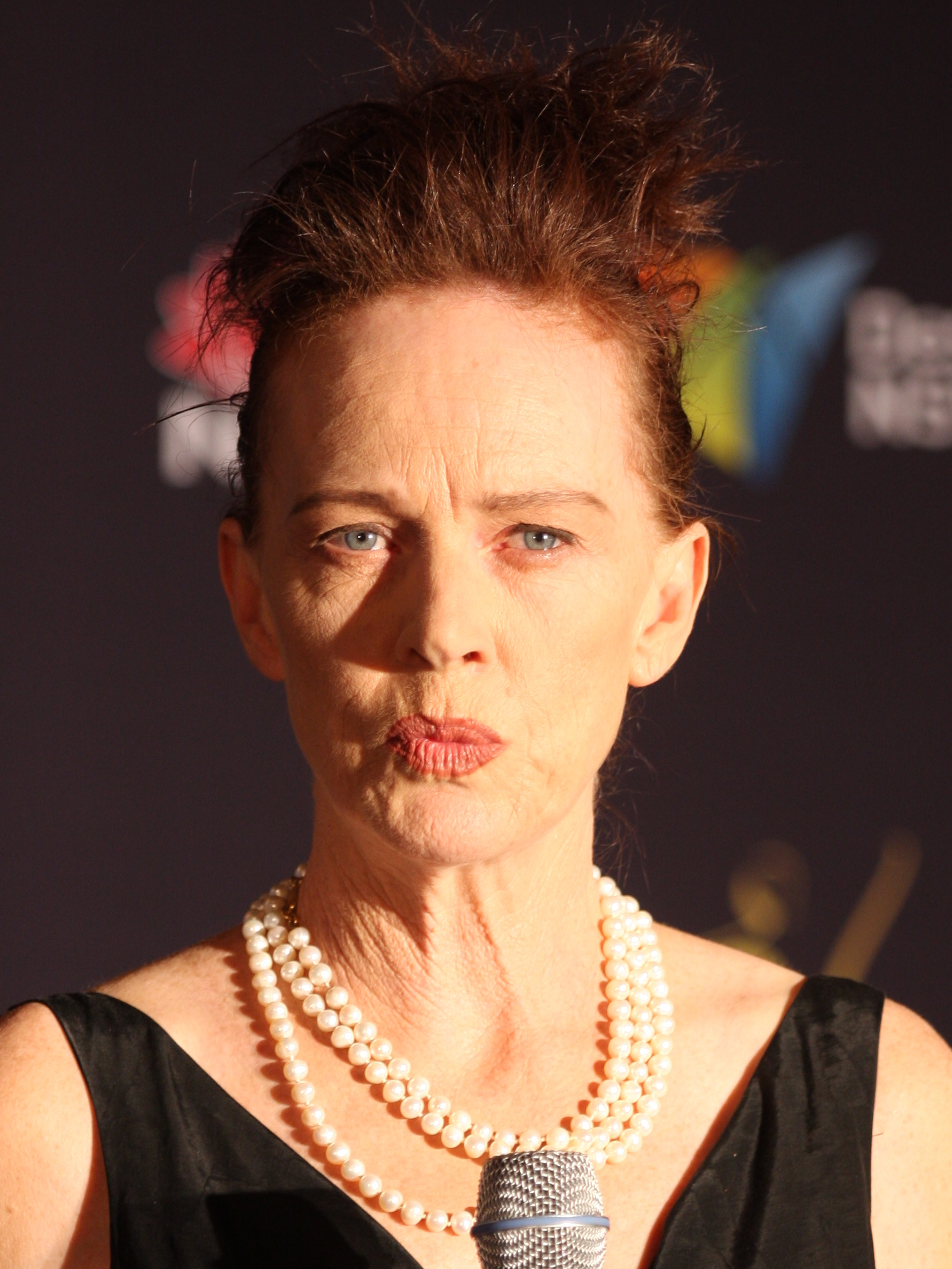
- Judy Davis in 2012
- Film: 34
- Television series: 21

The film career of Judy Davis spans over four decades and includes credits in both film and television. Davis first garnered acclaim for her performance in the period drama My Brilliant Career (1979), which earned her two BAFTA Awards. She garnered international attention for her performance in A Passage to India (1984), for which she was nominated for the Academy Award for Best Actress.

In 1990, Davis appeared in Alice, directed by Woody Allen, followed by a supporting role in David Cronenberg's Naked Lunch, as well as Joel Coen's Barton Fink (both 1991). She subsequently starred in Allen's drama Husbands and Wives (1992), which saw her nominated for the Academy Award and Golden Globe Award for Best Supporting Actress, as well as a BAFTA for Best Actress. She subsequently co-starred with Glenn Close in the television drama film Serving in Silence: The Margarethe Cammermeyer Story (1995) before reuniting with Allen to appear in Deconstructing Harry (1997) and Celebrity (1998).

Davis starred as Lillian Hellman in the Kathy Bates-directed television film Dash and Lilly (1999), followed by Life with Judy Garland: Me and My Shadows (2001), a critically acclaimed miniseries in which she portrayed Judy Garland. She again portrayed another real-life character, Nancy Reagan, in the television film The Reagans (2003). Subsequent film roles include the romantic comedy The Break-Up (2006), Sofia Coppola's Marie Antoinette (2006), and The Dressmaker. In 2017, Davis co-starred with Jessica Lange and Susan Sarandon on the network series Feud, in which she portrayed journalist Hedda Hopper.

== Film ==
Key
†	Denotes films works that have not yet been released

Year	Title	Role	Director(s)	Notes	Ref.
1977	High Rolling	Lynn	Igor Auzins	Alternate title: High Rolling in a Hot Corvette	
1979	My Brilliant Career	Sybylla Melvyn	Gillian Armstrong		
1981	Hoodwink	Sarah	Claude Whatham		
1981	Winter of Our Dreams	Lou	John Duigan		
1982	Heatwave	Kate Dean	Phillip Noyce		
1982	Who Dares Wins	Frankie Leith	Ian Sharp	Alternate title: The Final Option	
1984	A Passage to India	Adela Quested	David Lean		
1986	Kangaroo	Harriet Somers	Tim Burstall		
1987	High Tide	Lilli	Gillian Armstrong		
1988	Georgia	Nina Bailley/Georgia White	Ben Lewin		
1990	Alice	Vicki	Woody Allen		
1991	Barton Fink	Audrey Taylor	Joel Coen		
1991	Impromptu	George Sand	James Lapine		
1991	Where Angels Fear to Tread	Harriet Harriton	Charles Sturridge		
1991	Naked Lunch	Joan Lee/Joan Frost	David Cronenberg		
1991	On My Own	The Mother	Antonio Tibaldi		
1992	Husbands and Wives	Sally	Woody Allen		
1993	Dark Blood	Buffy	George Sluizer	Incomplete and unreleased until 2012	
1994	The Ref	Caroline Chasseur	Ted Demme	Alternate title: Hostile Hostages	
1994	The New Age	Katherine Witner	Michael Tolkin		
1996	Children of the Revolution	Joan Fraser	Peter Duncan		
1997	Deconstructing Harry	Lucy	Woody Allen		
1997	Absolute Power	Gloria Russell	Clint Eastwood		
1997	Blood and Wine	Suzanne Gates	Bob Rafelson		
1998	Celebrity	Robin Simon	Woody Allen		
2001	The Man Who Sued God	Anna Redmond	Mark Joffe		
2001	Gaudi Afternoon	Cassandra Reilly	Susan Seidelman		
2003	Swimming Upstream	Dora Fingleton	Russell Mulcahy		
2006	The Break-Up	Marilyn Dean	Peyton Reed		
2006	Marie Antoinette	Comtesse de Noailles	Sofia Coppola		
2011	The Eye of the Storm	Dorothy de Lascabanes	Fred Schepisi		
2012	To Rome with Love	Phyllis	Woody Allen		
2013	The Young and Prodigious T.S. Spivet	Jibsen	Jean-Pierre Jeunet		
2015	The Dressmaker	Molly Dunnage	Jocelyn Moorhouse		
2021	Nitram	"Mum"	Justin Kurzel		
2026	Holy Days	Sister Agnes	Nathalie Boltt		
TBA	Butterfly Stroke †	Ruth	Denis Rabaglia		

== Television ==
Key
†	Denotes television productions that have not yet been released

Year	Title	Role	Notes	Ref.
1980	Water Under the Bridge	Carrie Mazzini	Miniseries	
1982	A Woman Called Golda	Golda Myerson/Meir	Television film	
1983	The Merry Wives of Windsor	Mistress Ford	BBC Television Shakespeare	
1985	The Mike Walsh Show	Guest - Herself	TV series, 1 episode	
1986	Rocket to the Moon	Cleo Singer	American Playhouse	
1991	One Against the Wind	Mary Lindell	Television film	
1995	Serving in Silence: The Margarethe Cammermeyer Story	Dianne	Television film	
1998	The Echo of Thunder	Gladwyn Ritchie	Television film	
1999	Dash and Lilly	Lillian Hellman	Television film	
1999	A Cooler Climate	Paula Tanner	Television film	
2001	Life with Judy Garland: Me and My Shadows	Judy Garland	Miniseries	
2003	The Reagans	Nancy Reagan	Television film	
2003	Coast to Coast	Maxine Pierce	Television film	
2006	A Little Thing Called Murder	Sante Kimes	Television film	
2007	The Starter Wife	Joan McAllister	Miniseries	
2007	Masters of Science Fiction: A Clean Escape	Dr. Deanna Evans	2 episodes	
2011	Page Eight	Jill Tankard	Television film	
2009	Diamonds	Senator Joan Cameron	2 episodes	
2014	Salting the Battlefield	Jill Tankard	Television film	
2017	Feud: Bette and Joan	Hedda Hopper	8 episodes	
2018	Mystery Road	Emma James	6 episodes	
2020	Ratched	Betsy Bucket	8 episodes	
2022	Roar	Rosey	Episode: "The Woman Who Ate Photographs"	
TBA	Two Birds †	Mrs. Baxter	Main role	

== Theatre ==
Year	Production	Role(s)	Playwright	Venue	Refs.
1976	Miss Hook of Holland	Chorus	Austen Hurgon; Paul Rubens	National Institute of Dramatic Art	
1977	Romeo and Juliet	Juliet	William Shakespeare	National Institute of Dramatic Art	
1977	Mother and Son	Emma	Louis Esson	National Institute of Dramatic Art	
1977	The Hostage	Meg	Brendan Behan	National Institute of Dramatic Art	
1977	Once in a Lifetime	Actor	Moss Hart; George S. Kaufman	National Institute of Dramatic Art	
1978	Visions	Marie	Louis Nowra	Paris Theatre Company, Sydney	
1978	Cedoona	Performer	Ron Blair	Space Theatre, Adelaide	
1979	The Importance of Being Earnest	Gwendolen Fairfax	Oscar Wilde	Q Theatre, Penrith	
1979	The Department	Myra	Richard Brooks	Q Theatre, Penrith	
1979	The Father	Bertha	August Strindberg	Q Theatre, Penrith	
1979	The Good Soldier Schweik	Kati	Jaroslav Hašek	Q Theatre, Penrith	
1979	How the Other Half Loves	Teresa Phillips	Alan Ayckbourn	Q Theatre, Penrith	
1980	Piaf	Edith Piaf	Pam Gems	Playhouse Theatre, Perth	
1981	Lulu	Lulu	Louis Nowra	The Playhouse, Adelaide	
1982	Insignificance	The Actress	Terry Johnson	Royal Court Theatre, London	
1983	Miss Julie	Miss Julie	August Strindberg	Nimrod Theatre Company, Sydney	
1984	King Lear	Cordelia / The Fool	William Shakespeare	Nimrod Theatre Company, Sydney	
1984	The Bear	Popova	Anton Chekhov	Nimrod Theatre Company, Sydney	
1984	Inside the Island	Signe	Louis Nowra	Nimrod Theatre Company, Sydney	
1984	Hedda Gabler	Hedda Gabler	Henrik Ibsen	Sydney Theatre Company, Sydney	
1989	Hapgood	"Mother"	Tom Stoppard	Doolittle Theatre, Los Angeles	
2004	Victory	Susan Bradshaw	Howard Barker	Wharf Theatre, Sydney	
2011	The Seagull	Irina Arkadina	Anton Chekhov	Belvoir St Theatre, Sydney	
2025	The Spare Room	Helen	Helen Garner	Belvoir St Theatre, Sydney	

== Sources ==
- Callahan, Dan (2019). The Art of American Screen Acting, 1960 to Today. Jefferson, North Carolina: McFarland. ISBN 978-1-476-67695-1.
- McFarlane, Brian; Mayer, Geoff (1992). New Australian Cinema: Sources and Parallels in American and British Film. Cambridge, England: Cambridge University Press. ISBN 978-0-521-38768-2.
