= AACTA Award for Best Hair and Makeup =

Australian film award

- Country: Australia
- Presented by: Australian Academy of Cinema and Television Arts (AACTA)
- First award: 2016
- Currently held by: Cleverman (2016)
- Website: http://www.aacta.org

The AACTA Award for Best Hair and Makeup is an award presented by the Australian Academy of Cinema and Television Arts (AACTA), a non-profit organisation whose aim is to "identify, award, promote and celebrate Australia's greatest achievements in film and television." The award is presented at the annual AACTA Awards, which hand out accolades for achievements in feature film, television, documentaries and short films. The award was first introduced in 2016 for the 6th AACTA Awards.

Feature films, documentaries and television programs are eligible for Best Hair and Makeup. A minimum of two candidates may be nominated in this category. To be considered, the production must: be broadcast and theatrically released in Australia during the award's eligibility period (for television programs and feature films or feature-length documentaries, respectably); have been wholly created in Australia.

Kath Brown, Simon Joseph and Troy Follington received the inaugural award for their work on Cleverman.

== Nominees and winners ==
Year	Film/program	Network	Recipient
2016 (6th)
2016 (6th)	Cleverman	ABC	Kath Brown, Simon Joseph and Troy Follington
2016 (6th)	A Place to Call Home	Foxtel	Wizzy Molineaux
2016 (6th)	Gods of Egypt	—N/a	Lesley Vanderwalt, Lara Jade Birch and Adam Johansen
2016 (6th)	Hacksaw Ridge	—N/a	Shane Thomas, Larry Van Duynhoven and Noriko Watanabe
2017 (7th)
2017 (7th)	Cleverman	ABC	Katherine Brown, Troy Follington, Simon Joseph
2017 (7th)	Blue Murder: Killer Cop	Seven Network	Nikki Gooley, Sheldon Wade
2017 (7th)	Hounds of Love	—N/a	Hayley Atherton, Kate Anderson
2017 (7th)	Science Fiction Volume One: The Osiris Child	—N/a	Jen Lamphee, Anna Gray, Melissa Chew
2018 (8th)
2018 (8th)	Ladies in Black	Lumila Films	Anna Gray, Beth Halsted, Jen Lamphee
2018 (8th)	Cargo	Causeway Films	Larry Van Duynhoven, Beverley Freeman, Helen Magelaki
2018 (8th)	Upgrade	Goalpost Pictures, Blumhouse Productions	Larry Van Duynhoven, Chiara Tripodi
2018 (8th)	Winchester	Blacklab Entertainment Pty Ltd	Steve Boyle, Tess Natoli
2019 (9th)
2019 (9th)	Lambs of God	Lingo Pictures	Zeljka Stanin, Paul Pattison, Cheryl Williams
2019 (9th)	The King	Plan B Entertainment	Alessandro Bertolazzi
2019 (9th)	Nekromancer	Guerilla Films	Angela Conte, Paul Katte, Nick Nicolaou, Rosemary Saffioti
2019 (9th)	The Nightingale	Causeway Films	Nikki Gooley, Larry Van Duynhoven, Cassie O'Brien
2020 (10th)
2020 (10th)	True History of the Kelly Gang	Film Victoria	Kirsten Veysey
2020 (10th)	I Am Woman	Goalpost Pictures	Nikki Gooley, Wendy de Waal, Cassie O’Brien
2020 (10th)	Operation Buffalo	Porchlight Films	Sheldon Wade, Kerryn Flewell-Smith, Cheryl Williams
2020 (10th)	Preacher: Episode 8: Fear of the Lord	Point Grey Pictures	Chiara Tripodi, Larry Van Duynhoven, Toni Ffrench
2020 (10th)	Relic	Film Victoria	Angela Conte, Larry Van Duynhoven, Bec Taylor
2021 (11th)
2021 (11th)	Australian Gangster	Roadshow Rough Diamond	Sheldon Wade
2021 (11th)	Mortal Kombat	New Line Cinema	Nikki Gooley
2021 (11th)	Ms Fisher's Modern Murder Mysteries	Every Cloud Productions	Lynn Wheeler
2021 (11th)	New Gold Mountain	Goalpost Television	Cheryl Williams, Helen Magelaki & Ian Loughnan
2021 (11th)	Nitram	Stan	Fiona Rees-Jones
