= Judy Davis =

Australian film, television, and stage actress (born 1955)

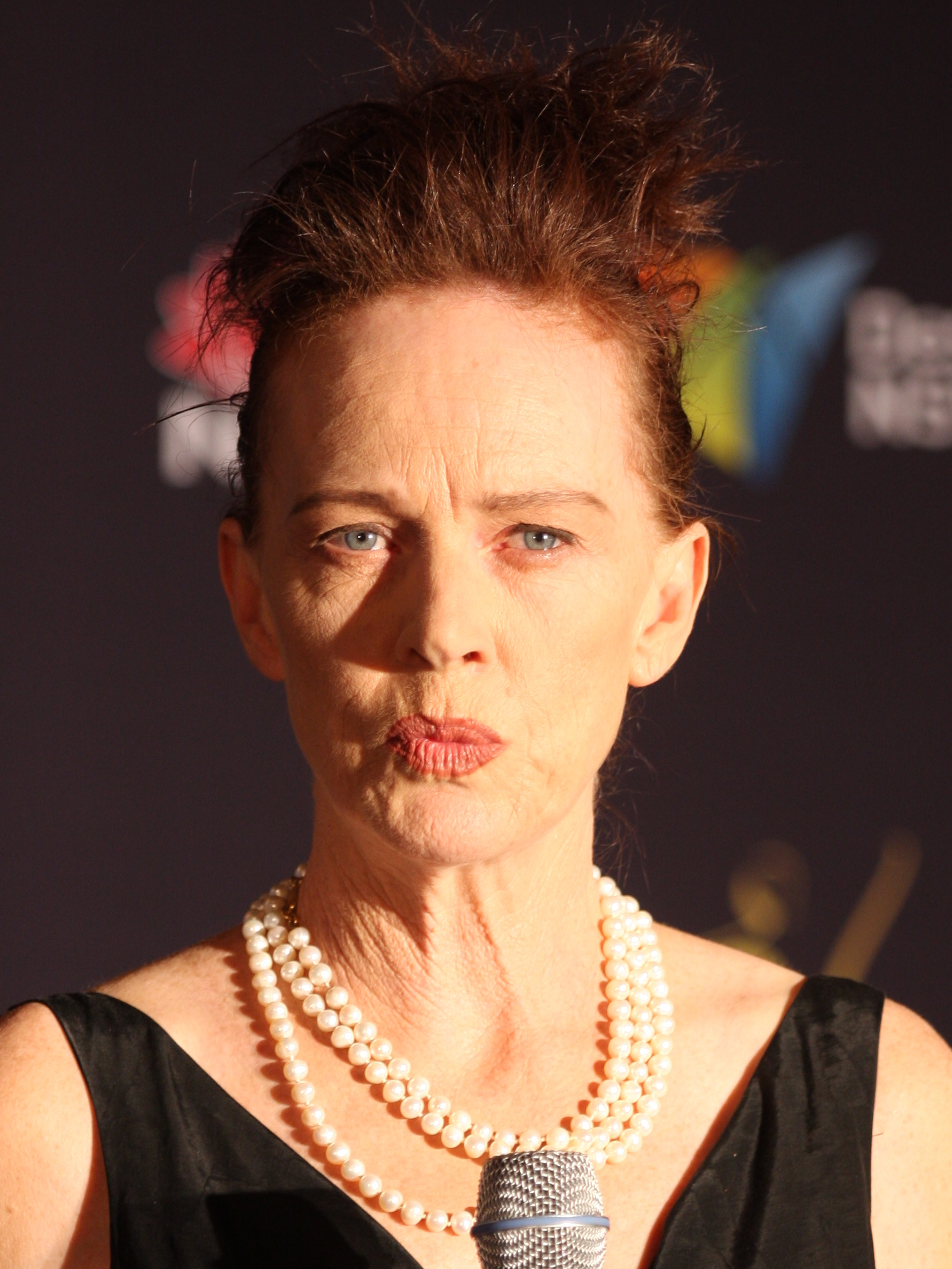
- Davis in 2012
- Born: Judith Davis; 23 April 1955 (age 71); Perth, Western Australia, Australia
- Education: Curtin University; National Institute of Dramatic Art (BFA)
- Occupation: Actress
- Years active: 1977–present
- Works: Full list
- Spouse: Colin Friels (m. 1984)
- Children: 2
- Awards: Full list

Judith Davis (born 23 April 1955) is an Australian actress. Widely regarded as one of the finest actresses of her generation, she is celebrated for her versatility and often portrays brittle, intelligent, neurotic and emotionally volatile women, with director Woody Allen describing her as "one of the most exciting actresses in the world". She has received several accolades include a record nine AACTA Awards, three Primetime Emmy Awards, two British Academy Film Awards and two Golden Globe Awards, in addition to nominations for two Academy Awards and a Laurence Olivier Award.

After graduating from the National Institute of Dramatic Art, Davis began her career on the stage and had her film debut in 1977. She rose to international attention with her leading role in the period drama film My Brilliant Career (1979), winning two BAFTA Awards. This led to starring roles in Hollywood projects, receiving her first Emmy nomination for the docudrama A Woman Called Golda (1982). She received nominations for the Academy Award for Best Actress for starring in the historical film A Passage to India (1984) and Best Supporting Actress for Allen's comedy-drama Husbands and Wives (1992).

Davis won three Primetime Emmy Awards for starring in the television film Serving in Silence: The Margarethe Cammermeyer Story (1995), and the miniseries Life with Judy Garland: Me and My Shadows (2001) and The Starter Wife (2007). Her subsequent films include Children of the Revolution (1996), Celebrity (1998), Marie Antoinette (2006), The Eye of the Storm (2011), To Rome with Love (2012), The Dressmaker (2015), and Nitram (2021).

== Early life ==
Davis was born in Perth, Western Australia, in the suburb of Floreat and had a strict Catholic upbringing. She was educated at Loreto Convent and the Western Australian Institute of Technology and graduated from the National Institute of Dramatic Art (NIDA), Sydney, Australia in 1977.

== Career ==
=== Screen ===
==== 1970s ====
After making her feature film debut in the buddy comedy High Rolling (1977), Davis first came to prominence for her role as Sybylla Melvyn in the coming-of-age saga My Brilliant Career (1979), opposite Sam Neill, for which she won BAFTA Awards for Best Actress and Best Newcomer. Davis was particularly praised for her performance; Janet Maslin of The New York Times admired her for bringing "an unconventional vigor to every scene she's in, even in a film that's as consistently animated as this one", while Luke Buckmaster, writing for The Guardian in 2014, commented that Davis gave "a rousing performance as bull-headed protagonist Sybylla Melvyn. The term 'once in a lifetime' tends to be slapped around like a bumper sticker, but this meaty role lives up to the accolade."

==== 1980s ====
Her success continued with lead roles in the Australian New Wave films Winter of Our Dreams (1981), as a waif-like heroin addict; the drama Heatwave (1982), as a radical Sydney tenant organizer; and the thriller Hoodwink (1981), as a sexually repressed clergyman's wife. Of her performance in Winter of Our Dreams, Roger Ebert wrote that: "Davis brought a kind of wiry, feisty intelligence to My Brilliant Career, playing an Australian farm woman who rather felt she would do things her own way. She's wonderful again this time, in a completely different role as an insecure, distrustful, skinny street waif. [She] performs her movement magnificently. Her international film career began when she played the younger version of Ingrid Bergman's Golda Meir in the television docudrama A Woman Called Golda (1981), for which she received a Primetime Emmy Award for Outstanding Supporting Actress – Miniseries or a Movie nomination. She then played a terrorist based on Vanessa Redgrave in the British film Who Dares Wins (1982).

She was cast as Adela Quested in David Lean's final film A Passage to India (1984), an adaptation of E. M. Forster's novel, and was nominated for the Academy Award for Best Actress. Variety praised Davis for having "the rare gift of being able to look very plain (as the role calls for) at one moment and uncommonly beautiful at another. Likewise, The Washington Post wrote, "With makeup the color of smudged ivory, her pallor enhanced by the off-white linens she wears, Davis is daringly unattractive for a leading lady; that plainness is emphasized in the book. Davis' neuroticism, her way of twitching and thrusting her jaw and looking up hungrily beneath the brim of her straw hat, brings to life the ravenous sexuality beneath Miss Quested's decorous exterior."

She returned to Australian cinema for her next two films, Kangaroo (1986), as a German-born writer's wife, and High Tide (also 1987), as a foot-loose mother attempting to reunite with her teenage daughter who is being raised by the paternal grandmother. Her performance in the latter won her glowing praise. Pauline Kael called Davis "a genius at moods" and wrote, "As one of three backup singers for a touring Elvis imitator, Judy Davis is contemptuous of the cruddy act, contemptuous of herself. The film's emotional suggestiveness makes it almost a primal woman's picture: Judy Davis has been compared with Jeanne Moreau, and that's apt, but she's Moreau without the cultural swank, the high-fashion gloss. She speaks to us more directly." She won additional Australian Film Institute Awards for both roles, and a National Society of Film Critics award for High Tide's brief American theatrical run.

Her final film of the decade, the Australian thriller Georgia (1988), saw her play dual roles, a mother, Georgia, and her daughter Nina. For her performance, Davis earned another Australian Film Institute nomination for Best Actress.

==== 1990s ====
Davis had a cameo in Woody Allen's Alice (1990), her first appearance in an Allen-directed film. The following year, she was featured in Joel Coen's Barton Fink, which won the Palme d'Or at the Cannes Film Festival, and in David Cronenberg's Naked Lunch, an adaptation of the hallucinogenic novel of the same name.

She returned to E. M. Forster territory in Where Angels Fear to Tread and won an Independent Spirit Award for her work as mannish woman author George Sand in Impromptu, a romantic period drama with Hugh Grant as her consumptive lover, Frédéric Chopin. Davis was especially lauded for her performance as Sand, and Hal Hinson of The Washington Post wrote, "Judy Davis makes her entrances as if she were straddling a cyclone. She doesn't just walk in, she blows in on a torrent of extravagant self-assurance and wild temperament. Sand, who's the locus of this blissfully high-spirited romp about the circle of writers and musicians in 1830s Paris, never does anything halfway; her life is an experiment in full-throttle, passionate immersion, and that's why Davis is the ideal actress for the part. She's the most atmospheric of actors, perhaps the only one around capable of streaking the screen with lightning."

She earned an Emmy nomination and her first Golden Globe Award for Best Actress – Miniseries or Television Film for her portrayal of a real-life Second World War heroine Mary Lindell in the CBS Hallmark Hall of Fame presentation One Against the Wind. Adrian Turner of Radio Times noted of her, "Judy Davis, one of the greatest and least "starry" actresses around, plays Lindell and shows the same sensitivity that she brought to her role in A Passage to India."

Cast in Woody Allen's Husbands and Wives (1992), Davis performed the major role of Sally Simmons, one half of a divorcing couple. Husbands and Wives was well received, and Davis's performance drew high praise. Vincent Canby of The New York Times wrote, "Sally must be one of the most endearingly impossible characters Mr. Allen has ever written, and Ms. Davis nearly purloins the film" and Todd McCarthy of Variety thought Davis had revealed "a whole new side to her personality that has never surfaced onscreen before." For this performance, she earned both Oscar and Golden Globe nominations for Best Supporting Actress.

In 1993, Davis filmed Dark Blood with River Phoenix; it would be his last acting role before his death by drug overdose that year. Delayed by Phoenix's death (he had reportedly completed shooting 80% of his scenes), the movie was finally released in 2012.

She next co-starred with Kevin Spacey in the comedy film The Ref (1994), portraying a married couple whose relationship is on the rocks, with Denis Leary playing a thief who counsels their marriage. Roger Ebert called Davis "naturally verbal" and praised her for being able to "develop a manic counterpoint" in her arguments with Spacey "that elevates them to a sort of art form." Similarly, Rolling Stone magazine's Peter Travers found Davis "combustibly funny, finding nuance even in nonsense." Considered "one of the fiercest film actors around", Davis's other roles have included the mysterious, schizophrenic mother of a teenager in boarding school in On My Own (1993), the lifelong Australian Communist Party member reacting to the downfall of the Soviet Union in Children of the Revolution (1996), two more Allen films, Deconstructing Harry (1997) and Celebrity (1998) and a highly-strung White House chief of staff in Absolute Power (1997). After appearing in Celebrity, The Guardian newspaper wrote that Davis "in recent years has succeeded Diane Keaton and Mia Farrow as Allen's misfit muse."

Much of her work in the late 90s was for television, gaining a collection of Emmy Award nominations. She won her first Emmy for portraying the woman who gently coaxes a rigid military woman, Glenn Close, out of the closet in Serving in Silence: The Margarethe Cammermeyer Story, with subsequent nominations for her repressed Australian outback mother in The Echo of Thunder (1998), her portrayal of Lillian Hellman in Dash and Lilly (1999) and her frigid society matron in A Cooler Climate (1999).

==== 2000s ====
Davis earned a second Emmy for her portrayal of Judy Garland in the television biographical film Life with Judy Garland: Me and My Shadows (2001). In 2003, she earned another Emmy nomination for her interpretation of Nancy Reagan in the controversial biopic The Reagans. In 2004 she co-starred with Richard Dreyfuss in Coast to Coast. In July 2006, she received her ninth Emmy nomination for her performance in the television film A Little Thing Called Murder. Her tenth nomination came in 2007 for Outstanding Supporting Actress in the U.S. miniseries The Starter Wife for which she was awarded the Emmy. In August 2007, she appeared opposite Sam Waterston in an episode of ABC's anthology series Masters of Science Fiction. She appeared on the TV mini-series Diamonds from 2008 to 2009.

In film, she continued to earn good notices for her supporting roles in Swimming Upstream (2003), as a working-class mother, and in the films The Break-Up (2006) and Marie-Antoinette.

==== 2010s ====
Davis appeared as Jill Tankard in a television drama film, Page Eight (2011), for which she was nominated for an Emmy. She played Dorothy de Lascabanes in The Eye of the Storm (2011), an adaptation of Patrick White's novel of the same title, for which she won the Australian Film Institute Award for Best Actress in a Leading Role. She also had a major role as Woody Allen's psychiatrist wife in his To Rome with Love.

Davis co-starred with Helena Bonham Carter and Callum Keith Rennie in The Young and Prodigious T.S. Spivet (2013). She reprised her role of Jill Tankard in Salting the Battlefield (2014) and costarred with Kate Winslet in The Dressmaker (2015), for which she won an AACTA Award for Best Supporting Actress. Although the film received mixed reviews, Davis's supporting performance was lauded by critics: Richard Ouzounian of the Toronto Star called her "sublime" and Justin Chang of Variety wrote, "Davis, whose performance here as a booze-swilling, dementia-addled and infernally sharp-tongued old matriarch is enough of a hoot to make one further wonder what she might have done with the role of Violet Weston in August: Osage County, onscreen or onstage."

In 2017, Davis received a Primetime Emmy nomination for her supporting performance as gossip columnist Hedda Hopper in Ryan Murphy's anthology television series Feud. The following year, Davis co-starred with Aaron Pederson in the six-part ABC TV Series, Mystery Road. Davis's performance as the local police sergeant was praised, and The New York Times wrote, "The thing that really sets Mystery Road apart is the actress who signed on to play the outback sergeant Emma James: the great Judy Davis, playing a police officer for the first time in her career and starring in an Australian TV series for the first time in nearly 40 years. Ms. Davis is so firmly identified in the American mind with intense, often neurotic city-dwelling characters that it takes an episode or two to get used to her climbing in and out of a police car in the dusty, empty landscapes, wearing a baggy blue uniform that swallows her tiny frame. It seems at first as if she might not be right for the part, but eventually you see that she's perfect. James is a formidable woman stuck in the middle of nowhere because of the bonds of family and history, and Ms. Davis's preternatural intelligence and tightly capped energy serve her well."

==== 2020s ====
In 2020 she reunited with Ryan Murphy portraying Betsy Bucket in the drama series Ratched. Also that year she acted in the Apple TV+ series Roar. The following year she acted opposite Caleb Landry Jones in the psychological drama film Nitram (2021) directed by Justin Kurzel. The film premiered at the 2021 Cannes Film Festival where it received positive reviews. Davis later earned the AACTA Award for Best Actress in a Leading Role.

On 26 March 2026, Davis was named in the cast for ITV co-commissioned series Two Birds.

=== Stage ===
Davis's stage work has been mostly confined to Australia. Early in her career, she played Juliet opposite Mel Gibson's Romeo. In 1978, she appeared in Visions by Louis Nowra at the Paris Theatre Company in Sydney. In 1980, she portrayed French chanteuse Edith Piaf in Stephen Barry's production of the Pam Gems play Piaf at the Perth Playhouse. She played both Cordelia and the Fool in a 1984 staging of King Lear by the Nimrod Theatre Company, and also starred in its productions of Strindberg's Miss Julie, Chekhov's The Bear, Louis Nowra's Inside The Island and, in 1986, the title role of Ibsen's Hedda Gabler for the Sydney Theatre Company.

In 2004, she starred in and co-directed Howard Barker's play Victory, as a Puritan woman determined to locate her husband's dismembered corpse. Other stage directorial efforts include Sheridan's The School For Scandal and Barrymore by William Luce (all three for the Sydney Theatre Company). She created the role of The Actress in Terry Johnson's Insignificance at the Royal Court in London, receiving an Olivier Award nomination, and appeared in a brief 1989 Los Angeles production of Tom Stoppard's Hapgood. Writing for Philadelphia magazine, David Fox found her "marvelous in the title role, as charismatic and commanding on stage as she is in film."

In 2011, she portrayed the role of fading actress Irina Arkadina in Anton Chekhov's The Seagull at Sydney's Belvoir St Theatre. Paul Chai of Variety praised her performance as Irina, writing, "Davis manages to instill Irina with not only a diva's haughty air and crafty manipulation but also with the right hint of fragility, as evidenced in her concern about being upstaged by the youthful and beautiful Nina."

== Acting credits and accolades ==
Davis has received numerous accolades including nine AACTA Awards, an Actor Award, two BAFTAs, three Primetime Emmy Awards, two Golden Globe Awards, an Independent Spirit Award. She also received nominations for two Academy Awards and a Laurence Olivier Award. She is the first Australian to receive Academy Award nominations in both categories of Best Actress and Best Supporting Actress (Note: As of 2023, only Cate Blanchett, Nicole Kidman, Heath Ledger, Margot Robbie and Geoffrey Rush have achieved this feat since Davis.) and the fourth Australian actress to receive an Academy Award nomination. (Note: As of 2023, twelve Australian women have been nominated for Academy Awards for acting. See the Best Actress and Best Supporting Actress sections of List of Academy Award winners and nominees from Australia for more information.)

She has won BAFTA Awards for both Best Actress and Most Promising Newcomer for the film My Brilliant Career (1979), and later received Academy Award nominations for A Passage to India (1984) and Husbands and Wives (1992). She earned a Laurence Olivier Award for Best Actress nomination for the 1982 London production of Insignificance.

For her work on television, Davis won Primetime Emmy Awards for Serving in Silence: The Margarethe Cammermeyer Story (1995), for playing Judy Garland in Life with Judy Garland: Me and My Shadows (2001) and The Starter Wife (2007) and the Golden Globe Award for Best Actress – Miniseries or Television Film for Life with Judy Garland: Me and My Shadows and One Against the Wind (1991).

== See also ==
- List of Academy Award winners and nominees from Australia
- List of Australian film actors
