= 11th AACTA International Awards =

Australian film and TV awards ceremony in 2022

- Date: 26 January 2022

Highlights
- Best Film: The Power of the Dog
- Most awards: The Power of the Dog (3)
- Most nominations: Belfast (7)

The 11th Australian Academy of Cinema and Television Arts International Awards, commonly known as the AACTA International Awards, is presented by the Australian Academy of Cinema and Television Arts (AACTA), a non-profit organisation whose aim is to identify, award, promote and celebrate Australia's greatest achievements in film and television. Awards were handed out for the best films of 2021 regardless of the country of origin, and are the international counterpart to the awards for Australian films.

The nominations were announced on 17 December 2021. Winners were announced on 26 January 2022.

== Winners and nominees ==
=== Film ===
Best Film: The Power of the Dog; Being the Ricardos; Belfast; Dune; Licorice Pizza; Nitram	Best Direction: Denis Villeneuve – Dune; Paul Thomas Anderson – Licorice Pizza; Kenneth Branagh – Belfast; Jane Campion – The Power of the Dog; Justin Kurzel – Nitram
Best Actor: Benedict Cumberbatch – The Power of the Dog as Phil Burbank; Andrew Garfield – tick, tick... BOOM! as Jonathan Larson; Caleb Landry Jones – Nitram as Nitram; Will Smith – King Richard as Richard Williams; Denzel Washington – The Tragedy of Macbeth as Lord Macbeth	Best Actress: Nicole Kidman – Being the Ricardos as Lucille Ball; Penélope Cruz – Parallel Mothers as Janis Martínez; Lady Gaga – House of Gucci as Patrizia Reggiani; Jennifer Hudson – Respect as Aretha Franklin; Kristen Stewart – Spencer as Diana, Princess of Wales
Best Supporting Actor: Kodi Smit-McPhee – The Power of the Dog as Peter Gordon; Bradley Cooper – Licorice Pizza as Jon Peters; Jamie Dornan – Belfast as Pa; Ciarán Hinds – Belfast as Pop; Al Pacino – House of Gucci as Aldo Gucci	Best Supporting Actress: Judi Dench – Belfast as Granny; Caitríona Balfe – Belfast as Ma; Cate Blanchett – Don't Look Up as Brie Evantee; Kirsten Dunst – The Power of the Dog as Rose Gordon; Sally Hawkins – Spencer as Maggie
Best Screenplay: Aaron Sorkin – Being the Ricardos; Paul Thomas Anderson – Licorice Pizza; Kenneth Branagh – Belfast; Jane Campion – The Power of the Dog; Shaun Grant – Nitram

=== Television ===
Best Comedy Series: The White Lotus; Hacks; Sex Education; Ted Lasso; The Great; The Kominsky Method	Best Drama Series: Succession; Maid; Mare of Easttown; Nine Perfect Strangers; Squid Game; The Handmaid's Tale
Best Actor in a Series: Murray Bartlett – The White Lotus as Armond; Lee Jung-jae – Squid Game as Seong Gi-hun; Ewan McGregor – Halston as Halston; Jeremy Strong – Succession as Kendall Roy; Jason Sudeikis – Ted Lasso as Ted Lasso	Best Actress in a Series: Kate Winslet – Mare of Easttown as Marianne "Mare" Sheehan; Jennifer Coolidge – The White Lotus as Tanya McQuoid; Nicole Kidman – Nine Perfect Strangers as Masha Dmitrichenko; Jean Smart – Hacks as Deborah Vance; Sarah Snook – Succession as Siobhan "Shiv" Roy
