= List of Luxe Listings Sydney episodes =

Luxe Listings Sydney is an Australian reality television series which began July 9, 2021, and airs on Amazon Prime Video. The series’ third season chronicles four real estate and buyers agents in Sydney, Australia— Simon Cohen, D'Leanne Lewis, Gavin Rubinstein and Monika Tu —as they navigate their hectic personal and business lives; whilst showcasing, buying and selling multi-million dollar properties in one of the world's most competitive real estate markets.

As of October 21, 2022, a total of 18 original episodes of Luxe Listings Sydney have aired.

== Series overview ==
| Season | Episodes | Originally released | |
| Season | Episodes | First released | Last released |
|---|---|---|---|
| 1 | 6 | July 9, 2021 | July 9, 2021 |
| 2 | 6 | April 1, 2022 | April 22, 2022 |
| 3 | 6 | September 30, 2022 | October 21, 2022 |

== Episodes ==
=== Season 1 (2021) ===
Simon Cohen, D'Leanne Lewis and Gavin Rubinstein are introduced as series regulars. Shani Asadon, Patrick Cosgrove, Daniella Jooste, Oliver Lavers, Remi Lindsay, Jarryd Rubinstein, Tammy Soglanich, Cae Thomas and Evan Williams served in recurring capacities.

Luxe Listings season 1 episodes
| No. overall | No. in season | Title | Original release date |
|---|---|---|---|
| 1 | 1 | "That's the Vibe" | July 9, 2021 |
| 2 | 2 | "Business Before Everything" | July 9, 2021 |
| 3 | 3 | "Dynamite Comes in Small Packages" | July 9, 2021 |
| 4 | 4 | "If You Don’t Like Rejection, Get Out Of Real Estate" | July 9, 2021 |
| 5 | 5 | "Don't Wing It, Know It" | July 9, 2021 |
| 6 | 6 | "Loose Lips Sink Ships" | July 9, 2021 |

=== Season 2 (2022) ===
Monika Tu joined the cast. Asadon, Cosgrove, Lavers, Lindsay, Soglanich, Thomas, Williams, Jacob Hannon and Sebastian Maxwell served in recurring capacities.

Luxe Listings season 2 episodes
| No. overall | No. in season | Title | Original release date |
|---|---|---|---|
| 7 | 1 | "Ladies And Gentlemen Welcome Home" | April 1, 2022 |
| 8 | 2 | "Is It Wow To Me Or Wow To The House?" | April 1, 2022 |
| 9 | 3 | "Taking The Good With The Bad" | April 1, 2022 |
| 10 | 4 | "8th Wonder Of The World" | April 8, 2022 |
| 11 | 5 | "There Goes My Zen" | April 15, 2022 |
| 12 | 6 | "You Eat What You Kill" | April 22, 2022 |

=== Season 3 (2022) ===
Asadon, Cosgrove, Lavers, Lindsay, Soglanich, Thomas, Hannon, Maxwell, Tas Costi, Noa Oziel and Ching Ching Yiu served in recurring capacities.

Luxe Listings season 3 episodes
| No. overall | No. in season | Title | Original release date |
|---|---|---|---|
| 13 | 1 | "When Opportunity Knocks We Answer" | September 30, 2022 |
| 14 | 2 | "Pressure makes diamonds" | September 30, 2022 |
| 15 | 3 | "Sitting on top of the World" | September 30, 2022 |
| 16 | 4 | "Put a ring on it" | October 7, 2022 |
| 17 | 5 | "I think I've died and gone to heaven" | October 14, 2022 |
| 18 | 6 | "What I was born to freakin do" | October 21, 2022 |
