= June Again =

2021 Australian film

- Directed by: J. J. Winlove
- Written by: J. J. Winlove
- Produced by: Drew Bailey; Jamie Hilton; Michael Pontin
- Starring: Noni Hazlehurst; Claudia Karvan; Stephen Curry
- Cinematography: Hugh Miller
- Edited by: Mark Warner
- Music by: Christopher Gordon
- Release dates: May 6, 2021 (Australia); January 7, 2022 (United States)
- Running time: 99 minutes
- Country: Australia
- Language: English

June Again is a 2021 Australian comedy film co-written and directed by J. J. Winlove.

== Plot ==
June Wilton (Noni Hazlehurst) has been living in a nursing home for five years, suffering from vascular dementia. She’s being well looked after and is sometimes visited by an adult daughter whom she does not recognize. Then, one morning, June awakens completely lucid. However, she thinks only two or three months have gone by. Determined to go home and see her family, she flees the facility only to discover that her home has been sold, the lives of her adult children are in disarray and the family business she oversaw is in a downward spiral. Knowing that her lucidity is fleeting and that her dementia may resurface at any moment, June sets out to fix what's wrong with her family—whether they like it or not.

== Cast ==
- Noni Hazlehurst as June
- Claudia Karvan as Ginny
- Stephen Curry as Devon
- Steve Le Marquand as Roger

== Reception ==
Rotten Tomatoes lists 12 critics with all 12 assessed as fresh. It gave the film a score of 100%.

Paul Byrnes of The Sydney Morning Herald gives it 3 stars, concluding "The film has its rewards, mostly to do with Hazlehurst’s luminous performance, but it could have been a contender." Jane Freebury of the Canberra Times gave it 4 stars, writing "JJ Winlove's insights into the dynamics of a typical family carry heft. It's a skill to portray family struggles in ways that seem fresh, breezy and non-judgemental."

== Awards ==
- 11th AACTA Awards
  - Best Original Score - Christopher Gordon - won
  - Best Lead Actress - Noni Hazlehurst - nominated
  - Best Supporting Actress - Claudia Karvan - nominated
  - Best Original Screenplay - JJ Winlove - nominated
