= The Mother Stone =

Studio album by Caleb Landry Jones
- Released: May 1, 2020
- Studio: Valentine (Hollywood, California)
- Genre: Psychedelic rock
- Length: 65:12
- Label: Sacred Bones
- Producer: Nic Jodain

Singles from The Mother Stone
- 1. "Flag Day / The Mother Stone" Released: February 11, 2020; 2. "All I Am in You / The Big Worm" Released: March 4, 2020; 3. "I Dig Your Dog" Released: April 21, 2020

The Mother Stone is the debut studio album by American actor and musician Caleb Landry Jones. It was released through the Brooklyn-based Sacred Bones Records on May 1, 2020. The album was recorded in Los Angeles and was mainly written by Jones while he was working on the films The Outpost and The Kindness of Strangers. It received generally positive reviews, with praise for its innovating sound, but some criticism directed at its length and lack of narrative coherence.

== Background and artwork ==
The album was recorded in Los Angeles and Jones worked on the album while he was working on two films. He wrote the instrumental track "Flag Day" when he was in Bulgaria working on the movie The Outpost and he wrote substantial parts of the album when he was stationed in Toronto making The Kindness of Strangers. When he finished working on the movie, he wrote "a few more songs" in New York. Jones has stated that the money he made from being a part of the movie The Outpost funded the album and made it possible to record and release. Jim Jarmusch was the one that recommended Jones to Sacred Bones Records and eventually producer Nic Jodain teamed up with Jones and helped out with the album's production. Jones wrote all of the songs on the album and also played drums, keyboards and rhythm guitar on all tracks. His longtime friend Robert Hudson, who Jones had a band together with called "Robert Jones", played bass on the entirety of the record.

The artwork for the record features Jones in a Marie Antoinette–era wig with a white powdered face and red lips, while holding a cigarette in his hand. There isn't any specific meaning behind the choice of the artwork, according to Vulture. Jones's girlfriend Katya Zvereva had a warehouse which the couple could use and they just "made some things they thought looked cool."

== Critical reception ==
Professional ratings
Aggregate scores
Source	Rating
Metacritic	63/100
Review scores
Source	Rating
AllMusic	3/5 stars
Beats Per Minute	71%
Clash	7/10
Exclaim!	7/10
musicOMH	5/5 stars
The Line of Best Fit	8/10
Pitchfork	6.4/10

The Mother Stone received generally positive reviews from music critics. On the review aggregate website Metacritic, The Mother Stone received a score of 63, based on eight reviews, indicating "generally favorable reviews". Album of the Year assessed the critical consensus as a 73 out of 100, based on nine reviews.

AllMusic critic Timothy Monger wrote that Jones, on the album, "unleashed what sounds like a lifetime's worth of ideas and pent-up weirdness, constructing a wild suite of interconnected songs, replete with lurching orchestral sections and harsh fuzzy textures and sung in a variety of different voices and timbres like a character actor gone off the rails". Monger also declared the album unpredictable and praised the production, while at the same time stating that the album lacks memorable songs. Caroline Edwards of Clash gave the album a positive review, writing that it's "unlike anything else out in music right now. It's risky and at times, clumsy, but overall, effective. The record is fun and isn't afraid to be weird - it's evident Jones was passionate about the project and that it wasn't just a second thought. While it won't be played on Radio 1 anytime soon, listening to the album is artistic at its core, and more so, a cathartic and worthwhile experience". Exclaim!'s reviewer Matt Yuyitung opined that "The Mother Stone is impressive in the size and scope of its ambition, but that size overwhelms any kind of narrative coherence". He continued by stating that the album is "a disorienting, manic, ambitious psychedelic statement filled with constant twists and turns, and this is both its biggest strength and most notable weakness".

Ross Horton of musicOMH acclaimed the album and called it a "modern classic", while at the same time comparing the album to The Beatles' work. Murphy wrote the following: "It's hard to believe that albums like this are still being made, for it plays like a record that was hidden away from the world for 50 years, came to life in its cave, and has now emerged to take its revenge on its captors. Simply put, his [Jones'] music seems alive, and utterly modern – despite its clear and obvious debt to The Beatles. Jones may face accusations that his album is derivative (it is), or that he's playing it safe by opting to use the tools of the greatest band of all time (he's not), but ultimately, listeners have to recognise that if it was this easy, everyone would do it. This is a staggering work, a monumental achievement – and easily eclipses any of Jones' acting to date". However, Murphy noted The Mother Stone's length as a negative aspect of the album. Pitchfork's reviewer Cat Zhang wrote that Jones' "musical debut is full of shadowy theatrics and cryptic gibberish. Rarely do you encounter music this bombastic and unreasonable". Zhang further opined that "Caleb Landry Jones' music inspires a reaction somewhere in the middle of the album and "it's interesting, even fun while it lasts, but you probably won't return". Liam Inscoe-Jones of The Line of Best Fit noted the song "Katya" as the album's highlight, while mentioning the following regarding the record as a whole: "Stylistic consistency is key to the steady enjoyability of the music; the record is filled with wilting harmonies, Wurlitzer, wry saxophone, woodwind and garage-rock guitar vamps across the board. You can tell this an artist comfortable with the spotlight because he [Jones] surrounded himself in an entire circus, and the whole record is a vibrant splash of colour".

== Personnel ==
=== Musicians ===
- Caleb Landry Jones – vocals, drums, percussion, guitar, keyboards
- Robert Hudson – bass, guitar
- The Nona Quartet – strings (tracks 1, 3–5, 7, 8, 10–15)
- Danny Lee Blackwell – guitar (tracks 1, 5)
- Danny T. Levin – brass (tracks 1, 8, 9, 13, 15)
- David Moyer – woodwinds (tracks 1, 8, 9, 13, 15)
- P. Blake Cooper – tuba (tracks 1, 13, 15)
- Travis Pavur – additional guitar (track 1)
- The Baby Flames – backing vocals (tracks 2, 15)
  - Stephanie Hunt
  - Jazz Mills
- Robert Levon Been – guitar (track 5)
- Matt Larocca – guitar (tracks 6, 12, 13, 15)
- Craig Eastman – fiddle (track 9)

=== Technical ===
- Caleb Landry Jones – production
- Nic Jodoin – production, mastering, mixing, engineering
- Travis Pavur – engineering
- Franky Flowers – additional engineering
- Alec Ruvalcaba – engineering assistance
- Yochanan Austin – engineering assistance
- Will Penczak – engineering assistance
- Drew Erickson – arrangement (tracks 1, 3–5, 7, 8, 10–15)

== Release history ==
Release formats for The Mother Stone
Country	Date	Format	Label	Ref.
Various	May 1, 2020	CD; digital download; streaming; vinyl	Sacred Bones Records	
