= Nat's What I Reckon =

Australian YouTube channel

- Born: 1980s New South Wales, Australia
- Occupations: YouTuber; stand-up comedian; musician; writer
- Partner: Julia Gee (2016–present)

YouTube information
- Channel: Nat's What I Reckon
- Years active: 2006–present
- Genres: Cooking; comedy; Australian culture
- Subscribers: 469 thousand
- Views: 31.9 million
- Last updated: July 2024
- Website: www.natswhatireckon.com

Nat's What I Reckon is an Australian YouTube channel featuring Nathan "Nat" Bartolo, a Sydney-based stand-up comedian, mental health advocate, rock musician and social commentator.

The YouTube channel presents a mixture of content ranging from trade show reviews, cooking tutorials and social commentary, with Dave Grohl, Carl Cox and Yael Stone among the channel's fans. He has collaborated on his YouTube channel with Machine Gun Kelly, Mighty Car Mods and Briggs.

As of July 2024, the channel has over 469,000 subscribers and over 31.94 million views.

In December 2020, Bartolo released a book titled Un-cook Yourself: A Ratbag's Rules for Life, which was awarded the Booktopia Favourite Australian Book Award for 2020.

== History ==
Bartolo grew up in Sydney, Australia. He describes his childhood as being "difficult" with periods of suffering from anxiety and depression. He attended the Hillsong Church where his father was a minister. He left the church while still a teenager and spent time backpacking throughout India.

He attended a Waldorf school before studying singing and guitar at a private college in Sydney.

The YouTube channel began in 2006 and featured regular videos titled "Is it shit?", where Bartolo would review a variety of topics and decide if the topic was worthwhile.

In 2016, Bartolo met his partner Julia Gee, known as Jules, via a dating app. She works as a graphic designer designing artwork for the YouTube channel and also films their videos.

In 2019, Bartolo was an ambassador for the UNSW Big Anxiety Festival.

In 2020, the channel began featuring healthy cooking segments when a stand-up comedy tour featuring Bartolo was cancelled due to COVID-19 lockdowns across Australia. Bartolo noticed supermarkets were low on stock for jar sauces while fresh produce remained on the shelves during panic buying due to the coronavirus pandemic.

Bartolo turned to healthy cooking and eating after having a lung removed due to complications from tuberculosis.

In September 2020, Growcom, a Queensland government–funded horticulture body, announced a partnership with Nat's What I Reckon as part of their Eat Yourself To Health campaign.

On December 6, 2020, Bartolo was the guest programmer on the Australian music video television show Rage.

In July 2021, Bartolo appeared on the ABC long-form interview television show One Plus One with Courtney Act.

In 2021, Bartolo released two organic wines with Nat's What I Reckon branding—named Reckon Roger & Ian's Boating Wine and Nat's What I Reckon Cheeky Redders Greenache—in a collaboration with Built To Spill and Dreaded Friend winery.

Bartolo is a musician with two Sydney-based bands, including as a singer and guitarist for Keggerdeth and drummer for the band Penalties.

In 2025, Bartolo made a guest appearance on the Network 10 Australian television sitcom, Ghosts.

== Publications ==
- Smash Hits Recipes - Available November 2023 ISBN 9781761343865
- Un-cook Yourself: A Ratbag's Rules for Life ISBN 9781761040900
- Death To Jar Sauce ISBN 9781761045820
- Life: What Bartolo to Do ISBN 9781761049835
