= Luxe Listings Sydney =

Australian real estate reality television show

- Genre: Reality television
- Developed by: Kyle Sandilands; Benjamin Scott; James Kennedy
- Directed by: Brad Gustafson
- Starring: Simon Cohen; D'Leanne Lewis; Gavin Rubinsten; Monika Tu
- Country of origin: Australia
- Original language: English
- No. of seasons: 3
- No. of episodes: 18 (list of episodes)

Production
- Executive producers: Chris Culvenor; Paul Franklin; Jake Hargreaves; Rikkie Proost; Sophia Mogford; Anastassia Gerakas; John Karabelas; Benjamin Scott; James Kennedy
- Producers: Cori Diamond; David Dutton; Melinda George
- Camera setup: Multi-camera
- Running time: 35-52 minutes
- Production companies: Kentel Entertainment; Eureka Productions; Amazon Studios

Original release
- Network: Amazon Prime Video
- Release: 9 July 2021 – 21 October 2022

Luxe Listings Sydney is a real estate lifestyle reality show on Amazon Prime Video premiered on 9 July 2021. The series follows real estate agents D'Leanne Lewis, Gavin Rubenstein and buyer's agent Simon Cohen as they hustle, negotiate and deal in their quest for success in the Sydney property market.

== Overview and casting ==
The first season premiered on July 1, 2021, and consisted of buyer's agent Simon Cohen, and real estate agents D'Leanne Lewis and Gavin Rubinstein, with Shani Asadon, Patrick Cosgrove, Daniella Jooste, Oliver Lavers, Remi Lindsay, Jarryd Rubinstein, Tammy Soglanich, Cae Thomas and Evan Williams as supporting realtors. Prime Video AU & NZ renewed the series for a second season 2 days later, stating that Luxe Listings Sydney was its highest viewed series in the history of its Amazon Originals' premieres.

The second season saw the return of all existing realtors, with the exception of Jooste, and the addition of the show's newest sales and buying agent, Monika Tu. The series returned April 1, 2022. Jacob Hannon and Sebastian Maxwell were added to the cast in recurring capacities, while Jarryd Rubinstein made a guest appearance.

Prime Video AU & NZ announced that the show was renewed for a third season, 2 days prior to the release of season 2. An October/November release date was expected for season 3, as executive producers stated that Prime Video is currently looking to expand the series with Canadian and European spin-offs. The first 3 episodes of the third season were released on September 30, 2022; followed by a week-by-week release of the remaining 3 episodes. The cast remained the same as the previous season, with the addition of Tas Costi, Noa Oziel and Ching Ching Yiu as supporting realtors. Evan Williams was demoted to a guest role following claims of alleged domestic abuse and a verbal altercation between himself, Thomas and another colleague, Jye Emdur; that occurred while filming the third season. It is reported that the altercation broke out following Williams claiming Thomas and Emdur "were pinching what he thought were his listings".

=== Legal dispute ===
Since 2023, co-creators Benjamin Scott and James Kennedy have been in litigation in the NSW Supreme Court concerning their company and rights related to the program. Reporting on the case states that Scott alleges Kennedy arranged undisclosed product placement of Rolex and Patek Philippe watches and other breaches, which Kennedy denies. In June 2025, Kennedy’s family business sold its Australian Rolex retail licence to Singapore-based The Hour Glass, ending its operation of Rolex boutiques in Australia.

== Realtors ==
=== Timeline of realtors ===
= Main cast (credited)
= Recurring cast (3+)
= Guest cast (1–2)

Realtors	Seasons		
Realtors	1	2	3
Simon Cohen	Main		
D’Leanne Lewis	Main		
Gavin Rubinstein	Main		
Monika Tu		Main	
Supporting realtors
Shani Asadon	Recurring		
Patrick Cosgrove	Recurring		
Daniella Jooste	Recurring		
Oliver Lavers	Recurring		
Remi Lindsay	Recurring		
Jarryd Rubinstein	Recurring	Guest	
Tammy Soglanich	Recurring		
Cae Thomas	Recurring		
Evan Williams	Recurring		Guest
Jacob Hannon	Guest	Recurring	
Sebastian Maxwell		Recurring	
Tas Costi		Guest	Recurring
Noa Oziel			Recurring
Zac Rabin			Recurring
Ching Ching Yiu			Recurring

== Episodes ==
Season	Episodes	Originally released	
Season	Episodes	First released	Last released
1	6	July 9, 2021	July 9, 2021
2	6	April 1, 2022	April 22, 2022
3	6	September 30, 2022	October 21, 2022
