= Alice Babidge =

Australian costume and production designer

- Education: National Institute of Dramatic Art
- Employer(s): Sydney Theatre Company, Griffin Theatre Company, Opera Australia

Alice Babidge is an Australian production, costume and set designer. She is known internationally for her work in film, opera and theatre.

== Biography ==
Babidge studied design at National Institute of Dramatic Art, graduating in 2004. She then joined the Sydney Theatre Company (STC), where she designed costumes for a wide range of classic plays by Shakespeare, Chekhov, Arthur Miller and others. In 2010 she was appointed STC's resident designer, a role that included the redesign of The Wharf bar.

For the Griffin Theatre Company her costume design work included Debra Oswald's The Peach Season (2006), and Katherine Thomson's King Tide (2007).

Film credits for costume design include Snowtown (2011), True History of the Kelly Gang (2019), The Dig (2021), Beau is Afraid (2023) and Foe (2023). For Nitram (2021), she was also production designer.

For Opera Australia she has designed costumes for Wagner's Ring Cycle (2013, 2016) and Hamlet (2024).

== Awards and nominations ==
After two previous nominations, Babidge won the 2015 Sydney Theatre Award for Best Costume Design of a Mainstage Production for Suddenly Last Summer. She received a further nomination in this category for A Cheery Soul in 2023. At the 8th Annual Australian Production Design Guild Awards, she won the Award for Excellence in Live Performance for Hotel Strindberg and both the Jennie Tait Award for Costume Design for Live Performance and the AIT Award for Set Design for Live Performance for Three Sisters.

Babidge won Best Costume Design at the 10th AACTA Awards for the True History of the Kelly Gang in 2020. The following year, she was nominated in both the Best Production Design and Best Costume Design categories for Nitram. She was nominated for the BAFTA Award for Best Costume Design in 2021 for The Dig.
