= Caleb Landry Jones =

American actor and musician

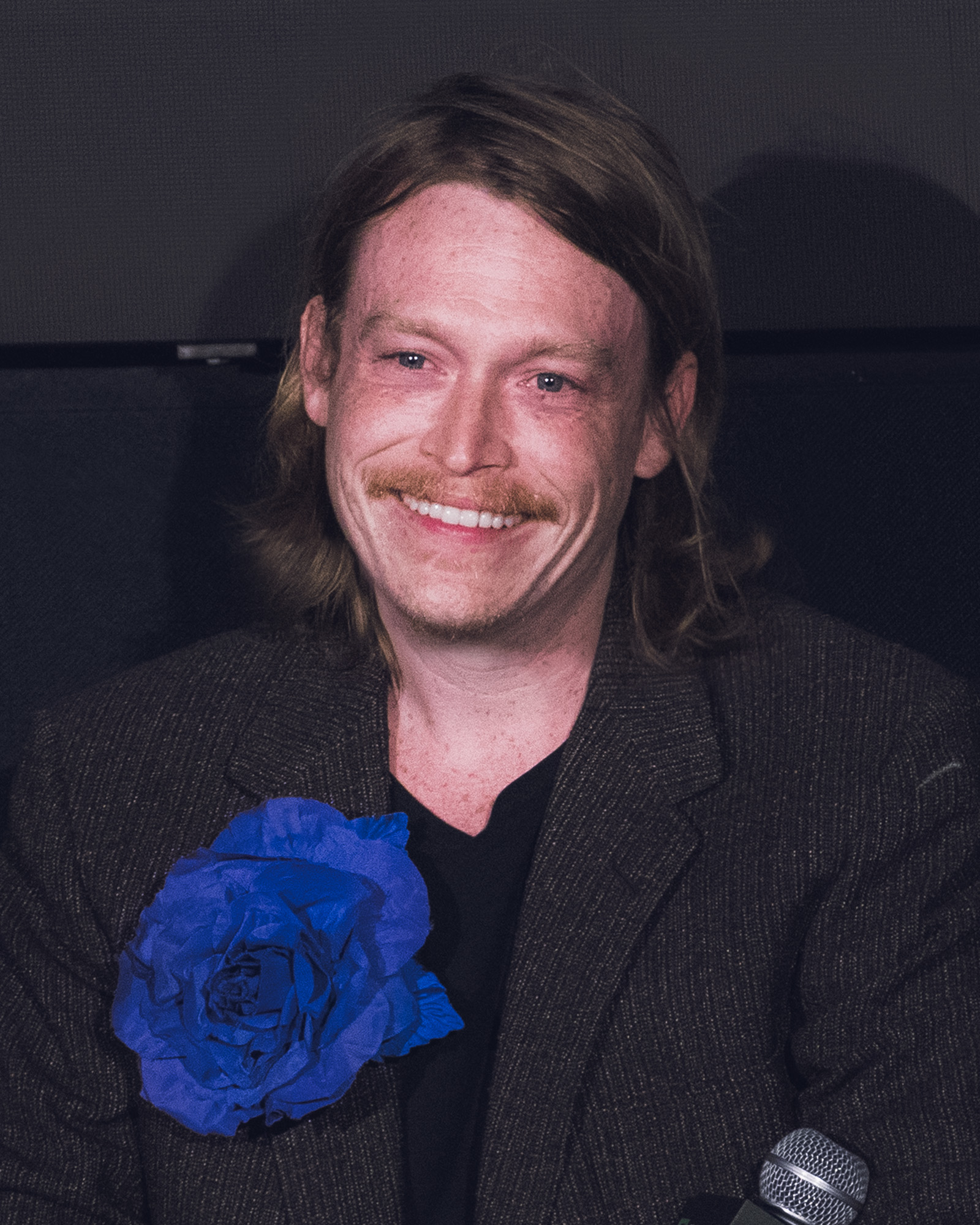
- Jones in 2026
- Born: December 7, 1989 (age 36); Garland, Texas, U.S.
- Occupations: Actor; musician
- Years active: 2007–present
- Spouse: Katya Zvereva
- Children: 1
- Musical career
- Genres: Psychedelic rock; Indie Rock; Progressive pop
- Instruments: Vocals; drums; percussion
- Label: Sacred Bones Records
- Member of: Robert Jones

Caleb Landry Jones (born 1989) is an American actor and musician. He first gained recognition for his supporting roles as Banshee in X-Men: First Class (2011), Jeremy Armitage in Get Out (2017), Jack Hicks in The Florida Project (2017), and Red Welby in Three Billboards Outside Ebbing, Missouri (2017). The latter earned him a SAG Award.

His leading roles include Syd March in Antiviral (2012), Ty Carter in The Outpost (2019), and Martin Bryant in Nitram (2021), which earned him a Cannes Film Festival Award for Best Actor and a AACTA Award for Best Actor in a Leading Role. He later starred in Luc Besson's Dogman (2023) and Dracula (2025).

== Early life ==
Jones was born in Garland, Texas and was raised in Richardson, a suburb in Dallas. His father Patrick is a contractor and his mother Cindy is a special educator. He is the second of three brothers. His older brother served in the Marine Corps. Jones' maternal grandparents had played in the Dallas Symphony Orchestra.

Jones attended Richardson High School, where his mother worked, and was encouraged to take ballet, tap, and theater classes. As a child, he was diagnosed with obsessive–compulsive disorder (OCD).

== Career ==
=== Acting ===
Jones discovered acting in speech class and began his professional acting career shortly afterward in a small role in the Coen brothers' No Country for Old Men (2007). He then played a drummer in Friday Night Lights (2008–2010) and Walt Jr.'s best friend Louis in Breaking Bad (2009–2010). In 2010, he had a supporting role in the supernatural horror film The Last Exorcism. He then played the mutant Banshee in X-Men: First Class (2011).

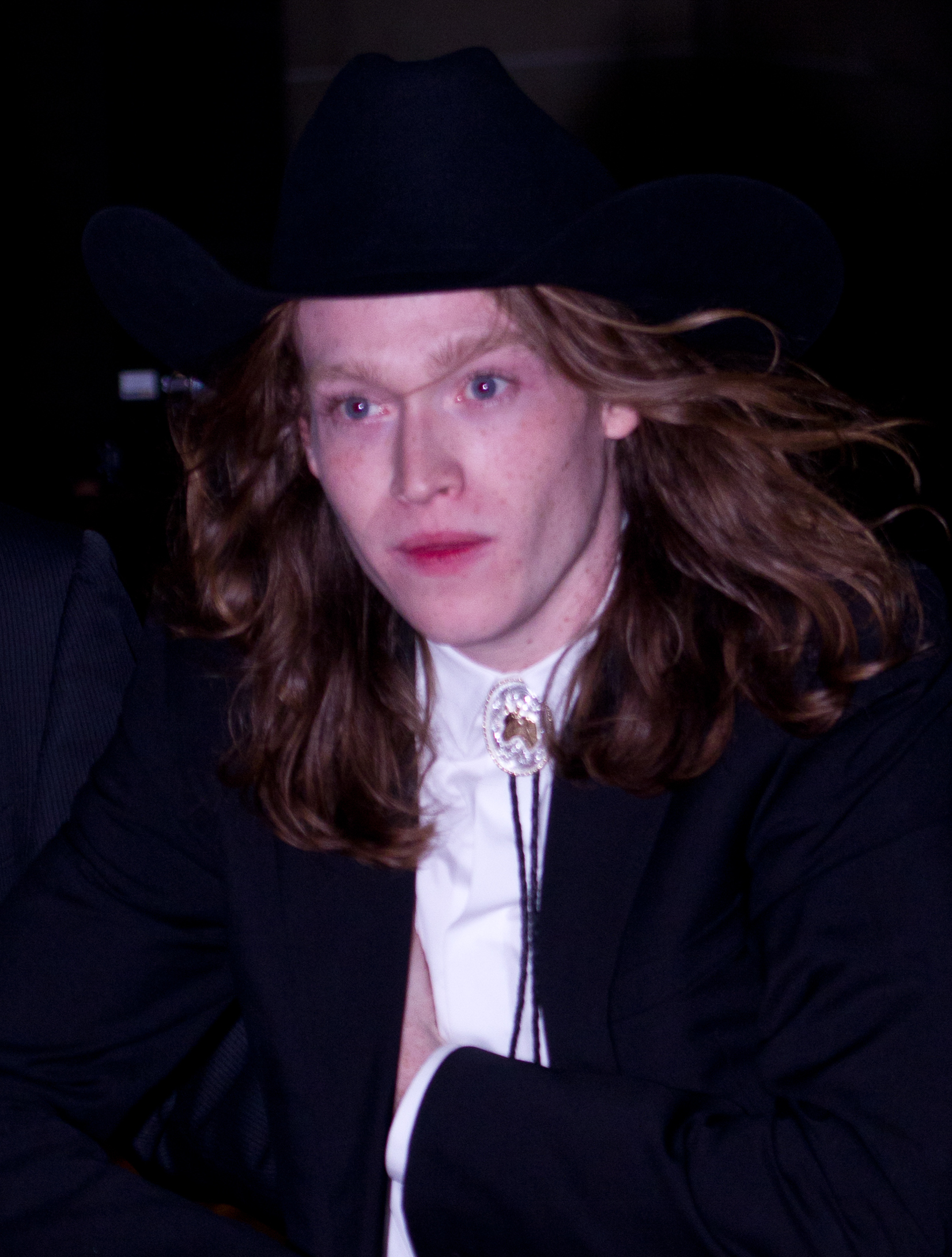
Jones at the 2012 Toronto International Film Festival

In 2012, he appeared in the action thriller film Contraband, which was an English-language remake of the Icelandic film Reykjavík-Rotterdam. In the same year, he played Frank in Neil Jordan’s horror film Byzantium, and had his first lead role in the science fiction horror film Antiviral, the feature-film debut of Brandon Cronenberg.

In 2017, he appeared consecutively in supporting roles in Doug Liman’s action comedy film American Made, Sean Baker’s The Florida Project, Jordan Peele’s psychological horror film Get Out, and in the crime drama film Three Billboards Outside Ebbing, Missouri. All four films were critically acclaimed. In 2019, he played Ty Carter in the war drama film The Outpost.

In 2021, he starred as the Australian mass murderer Martin Bryant in Justin Kurzel's Nitram, for which he won the Cannes Film Festival Award for Best Actor.

In 2023, he portrayed the lead role in Luc Besson’s action thriller film Dogman. Besson praised Jones's transformative performance and expressed his fascination with the actor. This inspired Besson to cast Jones as the eponymous character in Dracula (2025). Besson was not particularly interested in the story of Dracula, but instead reimagined the film specifically around Jones.

=== Music ===
He began his music career as a drummer for the worship band in his local church. By the age of 17, he started writing songs on his Casio keyboard. At 19, he formed the experimental folk-rock band Robert Jones with Robert Hudson and A.J. Durham.

On 1 May 2020, Jones released his debut studio album, The Mother Stone, through Sacred Bones Records. He has since released three more albums: Gadzooks Vol. 1 and Vol. 2 in 2021 and 2022, and Hey Gary, Hey Dawn in 2024.

== Personal life ==
Jones is married to Russian artist Katya Zvereva. They have one child.

== Discography ==
=== Albums ===
Year	Title
2020	The Mother Stone
2021	Gadzooks Vol. 1
2022	Gadzooks Vol. 2
2024	Hey Gary, Hey Dawn

=== Singles ===
Year	Title
2020	"Flag Day / The Mother Stone"
2020	"All I Am in You / The Big Worm"
2020	"I Dig Your Dog"

== Filmography ==
=== Film ===
Key
†	Denotes films that have not yet been released

Year	Title	Role	Notes
2007	No Country for Old Men	Boy on Bike	Credited as Caleb Jones
2008	The Longshots	"Jonesy" Jones	Credited as Caleb Jones
2010	The Last Exorcism	Caleb Sweetzer	
2010	The Social Network	Fraternity Boy	Credited as Caleb Jones
2011	Summer Song	Jack	
2011	X-Men: First Class	Sean Cassidy / Banshee	
2012	Contraband	Andy	
2012	Byzantium	Frank	
2012	Antiviral	Syd March	
2013	Tom at the Farm	Guillaume	Uncredited role
2014	God's Pocket	Leon Hubbard	
2014	Queen and Country	Percy Hapgood	
2014	Heaven Knows What	Ilya	
2014	Low Down	Cole	
2015	Stonewall	Orphan Annie	
2016	War on Everyone	Russell Birdwell	
2017	Get Out	Jeremy Armitage	
2017	The Florida Project	Jack Hicks	
2017	American Made	J.B.	
2017	Three Billboards Outside Ebbing, Missouri	"Red" Welby	
2018	To the Night	Norman	
2018	Tyrel	Pete	
2018	Age Out	"Swim"	
2018	Welcome the Stranger	Ethan	
2019	The Kindness of Strangers	Jeff	
2019	The Dead Don't Die	Bobby "Frodo" Wiggins	
2020	Viena and the Fantomes	Albert	
2020	The Outpost	Ty Carter	
2021	Nitram	Nitram	
2021	The Forgiven	Dally Margolis	
2021	Finch	Jeff (voice)	
2023	Dogman	Douglas	
2024	Harvest	Walter Thirsk	Also composer
2025	Dracula	Dracula	
2026	Down the Arm of God	Nick	Also co-writer and producer
TBA	Zero K †	TBA	Post-production
TBA	Untitled Arkasha Stevenson film †	TBA	Post-production
TBA	Summer of Roses †	TBA	Filming

=== Television ===
Year	Title	Role	Notes
2008–2010	Friday Night Lights	Jimmy Adler	5 episodes
2009–2010	Breaking Bad	Louis	2 episodes
2010	Victorious	Adorable Guy	Episode: "Tori the Zombie"
2017	Twin Peaks	Steven Burnett	4 episodes

== Awards and nominations ==
Awards and nominations received by Jenna Ortega
Year	Award	Category	Nominated work	Result	Ref.
2017	Detroit Film Critics Society Awards	Breakthrough Artist	Get Out, American Made, The Florida Project, Three Billboards Outside Ebbing, Missouri	Nominated	
2018	Screen Actors Guild Awards	Outstanding Performance by a Cast in a Motion Picture	Three Billboards Outside Ebbing, Missouri	Won	
2018	Screen Actors Guild Awards	Outstanding Performance by a Cast in a Motion Picture	Get Out	Nominated	
2021	Critics Choice Super Awards	Best Actor in an Action Movie	The Outpost	Nominated	
2021	Cannes Film Festival	Best Actor	Nitram	Won	
2021	AACTA Awards	Best Lead Actor in Film	Nitram	Nominated	
2021	AACTA Awards	Best Actor in a Leading Role	Nitram	Won	
2021	Asia Pacific Screen Awards	Best Performance by an Actor	Nitram	Nominated	
2021	Australian Film Critics Association Awards	Best Actor	Nitram	Won	
2021	Sitges - Catalonian International Film Festival	Best Actor	Nitram	Won	
