= Nikki Gooley =

Make-up artist

- Other names: Nicky Gooley; Nikki Goolle
- Occupation: makeup artist
- Years active: 1988-Present

Nikki Gooley is a make-up artist most known for her work on The Chronicles of Narnia: The Lion, the Witch and the Wardrobe.

She was nominated at the 78th Academy Awards for Best Makeup, she shared her nomination with Dave Elsey, for the film Star Wars: Episode III – Revenge of the Sith.

== Selected filmography ==
- The Island of Dr. Moreau (1996)
- The Matrix (1999)
- The Chronicles of Narnia: The Lion, the Witch and the Wardrobe (2005)
- Star Wars: Episode III – Revenge of the Sith (2005)
- Superman Returns (2006)
- The Water Horse (2007)
- X-Men Origins: Wolverine (2009)
