= One Against the Wind =

1991 American film

- Directed by: Larry Elikann
- Written by: Chris Bryant
- Produced by: William Hill; Tom Reeve
- Starring: Judy Davis; Sam Neill
- Cinematography: Dennis C. Lewiston
- Edited by: Peter V. White
- Music by: Lee Holdridge
- Release date: December 1, 1991
- Running time: 96 minutes
- Country: United States
- Language: English

One Against the Wind is a 1991 American television movie starring Judy Davis and Sam Neill. It was a Hallmark Hall of Fame presentation and it tells the true story of Mary Lindell. It was the first time Davis and Neill had worked together since 1979's My Brilliant Career.

== Cast ==
- Judy Davis as Countess Mary Lindell
- Sam Neill as Major James Leggatt
- Anthony Higgins as SS Capt. Herman Gruber
- Christien Anholt as Maurice Lindell
- Kate Beckinsale as Barbe Lindell

== Reception ==
Lee Winfrey of the Knight-Ridder News Service praised Judy Davis and said of the film "Director Larry Elikann seems thoroughly aware that the little screen sparkles brightest when it is energized by action. Elikann's directorial pace never slackens or wavers. He moves the action forward with consistent control and satisfying speed." Gerg Dawson in the Orlando Sentinel said "Against the Wind will be remembered for Judy Davis' exceptional performance — and for restoring our faith in the possibility of noble television". In The Grand Rapids Press Ruth Butler wrote "How rare to find a television production that can inspire."

== Awards ==
1992 Golden Globes

- Best Performance by an Actress in a Miniseries or Motion Picture Made for Television: Judy Davis - won
- Best Miniseries or Motion Picture Made for Television: One Against the Wind - won
- Best Performance by an Actor in a Miniseries or Motion Picture Made for Television: Sam Neill - nominated

1992 Primetime Emmy Awards

- Outstanding Individual Achievement in Casting: Joyce Gallie - won
- Outstanding Sound Mixing for a Drama Miniseries or a Special: Thomas J. Huth, Anthony Constantini, Sam Black, Trevor Black - won
- Outstanding Lead Actress in a Miniseries or a Special: Judy Davis - nominated
