= Dash and Lilly =

1999 American television film

- Genre: Biography; Drama
- Written by: Jerry Ludwig
- Directed by: Kathy Bates
- Starring: Sam Shepard; Judy Davis; Bebe Neuwirth; Laurence Luckinbill; David Paymer; Zeljko Ivanek; Ned Eisenberg; Mark Zimmerman; Victor A. Young; Stephanie Morgenstern
- Music by: Laura Karpman
- Country of origin: United States
- Original language: English

Production
- Executive producers: Stan Marguiles; Delia Fine; Antony Root
- Producers: Jerry Ludwig; Craig McNeil
- Production location: Toronto
- Cinematography: Bruce Surtees
- Editor: Cindy Mollo
- Running time: 100 minutes
- Production companies: A&E Networks; Granada Entertainment; The Stan Marguiles Company

Original release
- Network: A&E
- Release: May 31, 1999

Dash and Lilly is a 1999 American biographical drama television film about writers Dashiell Hammett and Lillian Hellman. The film was directed by actress Kathy Bates, written by Jerry Ludwig, and stars Sam Shepard and Judy Davis. It aired on A&E on May 31, 1999.

== Plot ==
The lives of Dashiell Hammett and Lillian Hellman are set against the golden era of Hollywood, HUAC and the issue of McCarthyism of the 1950s.

== Cast ==
- Sam Shepard as Dashiell Hammett
- Judy Davis as Lillian Hellman
- Bebe Neuwirth as Dorothy Parker
- Laurence Luckinbill as Joseph Rauh (Lillian's attorney)
- David Paymer as Arthur Kober (Lillian's husband)
- Željko Ivanek as Mel Berman

== Production ==
Filming took place in Toronto.

== Awards and nominations ==
Accolade	Ceremony Date	Category	Recipient	Results	Ref.
Golden Globes	January 23, 2000	Best Miniseries or Television Film	Dash and Lilly	Nominated	
Golden Globes	January 23, 2000	Best Actor in a Miniseries or Television Film	Sam Shepard	Nominated	
Golden Globes	January 23, 2000	Best Actress in a Miniseries or Television Film	Judy Davis	Nominated	
Primetime Emmy Awards	September 12, 1999	Outstanding Made for Television Movie	Stan Marguiles; Antony Root; Delia Fine; Craig McNeil; Jerrold L. Ludwig	Nominated	
Primetime Emmy Awards	September 12, 1999	Outstanding Directing for a Miniseries or a Movie	Kathy Bates	Nominated	
Primetime Emmy Awards	September 12, 1999	Outstanding Lead Actor in a Miniseries or a Movie	Sam Shepard	Nominated	
Primetime Emmy Awards	September 12, 1999	Outstanding Lead Actress in a Miniseries or a Movie	Judy Davis	Nominated	
Primetime Emmy Awards	September 12, 1999	Outstanding Supporting Actress in a Miniseries or a Movie	Bebe Neuwirth	Nominated	
Primetime Emmy Awards	September 12, 1999	Outstanding Costume Design for a Miniseries or a Movie	Nic Ede	Nominated	
Primetime Emmy Awards	September 12, 1999	Outstanding Cinematography for a Miniseries or a Movie	Bruce Surtees	Nominated	
Primetime Emmy Awards	September 12, 1999	Outstanding Single Camera Picture Editing for a Miniseries or a Movie	Cindy Mollo	Nominated	
Producers Guild of America		Outstanding Producer of Long-Form Television	Stan Marguilies; Antony Root; Delia Fine; Scott M. Siegler; Jon Cowan; Robert L. Rovner	Nominated	
Writers Guild of America		Original Long Form	Jerrold L. Ludwig	Won	
