= A Cooler Climate =

- Genre: Drama
- Written by: Marsha Norman
- Directed by: Susan Seidelman
- Starring: Sally Field; Judy Davis; Jerry Wasserman; Winston Rekert
- Music by: Patrick Williams
- Country of origin: United States
- Original language: English

Production
- Producers: Dan Paulson; Susan Rose
- Cinematography: John Bartley
- Editors: Michael Berenbaum; Shivam Sekariapuram
- Running time: 100 minutes
- Production companies: Paramount Television; Showtime Networks

Original release
- Network: Showtime
- Release: August 22, 1999

A Cooler Climate is a 1999 American made-for-television drama film directed by Susan Seidelman starring Sally Field and Judy Davis. It is based on a book with the same name by Zena Collier and originally aired on Showtime on August 22, 1999.

== Award nominations ==
Sally Field and Judy Davis were both nominated for their performance in the film during the 6th Annual Screen Actors Guild Awards for outstanding performance by a female actor in a television movie or miniseries. They both also received an Emmy nomination for their performances in the film.
