= On My Own (film) =

- Directed by: Antonio Tibaldi
- Written by: Antonio Tibaldi; Gill Dennis; John Frizzell
- Produced by: Ellepi Films; Rosa Colosimo Films
- Starring: Judy Davis; Matthew Ferguson
- Cinematography: Vic Sarin
- Edited by: Edward McQueen-Mason
- Music by: Franco Piersanti
- Production company: Alliance Communications Corporation
- Distributed by: Alliance Films
- Release dates: 1991 (Italy); 1992 (Spain); 1993 (Australia)
- Running time: 97 minutes
- Countries: Australia; Canada
- Language: English
- Budget: Can$3,885,000
- Box office: A$60,000 (Australia)

On My Own is a 1991 film starring Judy Davis and Matthew Ferguson. Ferguson plays Simon Henderson, a student at an Ontario boarding school, whose father lives in Hong Kong, and whose mother (played by Davis) is from England. The plot revolves around Simon coming to terms with the revelation that his mother has schizophrenia.

== Production ==
Some of the film's location shooting was done in London, England (not London, Ontario), St. Catharines, Ontario, Toronto and Stratford, Ontario. The film is primarily set at an "Ontario boarding school" and the scenes showing the school were filmed at two real-life boarding schools in Ontario, Ridley College (with its distinctive bell tower and entrance gates, called the Marriott Gates) and Upper Canada College (including the interior of the Upper School and the interior of Wedd's boarding house).

Post-production for the film was done in Australia by the South Australian Film Corporation.
