= Nitram =

2021 film by Justin Kurzel

- Theatrical release poster
- Directed by: Justin Kurzel
- Written by: Shaun Grant
- Produced by: Nick Batzias; Virginia Whitwell; Justin Kurzel; Shaun Grant
- Starring: Caleb Landry Jones; Judy Davis; Essie Davis; Anthony LaPaglia
- Cinematography: Germain McMicking
- Edited by: Nick Fenton
- Music by: Jed Kurzel
- Production companies: Good Thing Productions; Wild Bunch International; Melbourne International Film Festival Premiere Fund
- Distributed by: Madman Films; Stan
- Release dates: 16 July 2021 (Cannes); 30 September 2021 (Australia)
- Running time: 112 minutes
- Countries: Australia; Germany
- Language: English
- Box office: US$418,828

Nitram is a 2021 biographical psychological drama film directed by Justin Kurzel from a screenplay by Shaun Grant. The film revolves around the life and behaviors of a mentally distressed young man called "Nitram" (based on Martin Bryant), and the events leading to his involvement in the 1996 Port Arthur massacre in Tasmania. The film stars Caleb Landry Jones, Judy Davis, Essie Davis, and Anthony LaPaglia.

Nitram premiered at the Cannes Film Festival on 16 July 2021, where Jones won the Best Actor award for his performance. The film received a limited theatrical release in Australia on 30 September 2021, before a digital release on the Australian streaming service Stan on 24 November 2021. It received widespread critical acclaim for Kurzel's direction and the cast's performances (particularly Jones and Judy Davis), although the film sparked controversy in Tasmania. The film later received eight awards at the 11th AACTA Awards, including Best Film, Best Direction, Best Actor, Best Actress, Best Supporting Actor, Best Supporting Actress, and Best Original Screenplay.

== Plot ==
The film begins with real archive news footage from 1979 of a 12-year-old Martin Bryant being interviewed in a burns unit of a hospital after playing with fireworks. He is asked whether he has learned his lesson not to play with them again; he replies that he would play with them again.

Nitram is an intellectually disabled young adult who lives with his parents in Tasmania. He regularly sets off fireworks, which upsets the neighbours, and sells his fireworks to schoolchildren. His father has recently been approved for a business loan with which he hopes to buy a bed and breakfast that Nitram will help run. Nitram begs his mother to buy him a surfboard after seeing an attractive woman with a surfer, but she is exasperated and refuses.

Nitram starts mowing lawns to make money. In the process, he meets a neighbour named Helen, a retired actress and heiress, who offers to pay him to walk her dogs. The two quickly become friends, and Helen buys him a car, despite Nitram not having a driver's licence and exhibiting a dangerous habit of grabbing the steering wheel when the two are driving.

Nitram becomes increasingly frustrated with life at home and tells his parents he is moving in with Helen, who permits him to stay in a spare room but insists that he get rid of his air rifle as it upsets her. On his next birthday, Nitram introduces Helen to his parents; his mother tells Helen an anecdote about a young Nitram taking pleasure in the pain he caused her after pretending to be lost.

Despite having the funds for the bed and breakfast, Nitram's father's offer is rejected when another couple makes a higher offer, and he becomes despondent. Nitram asks Helen if the two can visit Hollywood, Los Angeles, but on the drive to the airport the next day he once again lunges for the steering wheel, resulting in a devastating car crash that kills Helen and severely injures him. When questioned by police, Nitram lies that he was asleep at the time of the crash.

Nitram, having inherited Helen's decaying mansion and over half a million dollars, starts to drink heavily. His mother asks him to help his father, who is severely depressed. Nitram then desperately attempts to buy the bed and breakfast, but the new owners flatly refuse. Several days later, his father's body is found in a nearby river after an apparent suicide. After he shows up to his father's funeral dressed in an electric blue suit and hat, Nitram's mother refuses to let him attend, fearing he will embarrass her. The increasingly isolated Nitram begins to take frequent overseas vacations by himself and practises shooting with his air rifle.

While watching the news one night, Nitram sees a report about the Dunblane massacre. He then becomes obsessed with guns, purchasing an unlicensed Colt AR-15 and shotgun and ordering a handgun. One day, he drives to the bed and breakfast his father wanted to buy and shoots the owners in an act of revenge, then drives to the café where Helen and his parents celebrated his birthday. After ordering food, he sets up a video camera, retrieves a rifle from his sports bag and opens fire on the tourists. At her home, Nitram's mother smokes, while the news report of the massacre played in the background.

== Cast ==
- Caleb Landry Jones as "Nitram" (based on Martin Bryant; "Nitram" is "Martin" spelt backwards)
- Judy Davis as Nitram's mother (based on Carleen Bryant)
- Essie Davis as Helen (based on Helen Mary Elizabeth Harvey)
- Anthony LaPaglia as Maurice (based on Maurice Bryant)
- Sean Keenan as Jamie
- Rick James as the gun shop owner

== Production ==
On 17 November 2020, it was announced that Justin Kurzel would direct a film focused on the 1996 Port Arthur massacre, starring Caleb Landry Jones, Judy Davis, Essie Davis and Anthony LaPaglia. Principal photography of the film began on 23 January 2021 and concluded on 13 March 2021 in Geelong, Victoria.

== Release ==
The film had its premiere at the Cannes Film Festival on 16 July 2021. It was scheduled to screen in mid-August at the later-cancelled Melbourne International Film Festival and later screened at CinefestOZ in Western Australia in late August 2021.

It received a limited theatrical release in Australia by Madman Films on 30 September 2021. It was later released digitally on the Australian streaming service Stan on 24 November 2021.

== Reception ==
On the review aggregator website Rotten Tomatoes, Nitram holds a 92% approval rating based on 118 reviews, with an average rating of 7.9/10. The website's consensus reads, "Nitram asks viewers to face a gut-wrenchingly grim moment in Australian history—but rewards that effort with a gripping, well-acted character study." On Metacritic, the film has a score of 81 out of 100 based on reviews from 26 critics, indicating "universal acclaim".

Donald Clarke of The Irish Times wrote a glowing review of the film, "Respectful in its treatment of the final carnage, psychologically nuanced without offering the perpetrator an ounce of sympathy, Nitram is a character study of the highest order." From NPR, Justin Chang praised the film, saying, "the movie avoids reducing them to a kind of climactic spectacle — a compassionate gesture at the end of this tense and despairing movie." In The Globe and Mail, critic Amil Niazi, wrote "It is the kind of work that presses on a nerve, begging you to stand up or tune out, but compelling you forward nonetheless – with its haunting portrayal." Similarly, writing for The Guardian, Luke Buckmaster praised the film, stating, "Another extraordinary achievement from Kurzel, who has a penchant for evoking gut-sinking emotional atmosphere."

=== Reception in Tasmania ===
The film was met by widespread controversy within Tasmania itself. Kelly Spaulding, mayor of the Tasman Council, which includes Port Arthur, condemned the choice to make the film. The Alannah and Madeline Foundation, which was established by Walter Mikac, whose wife and two young daughters were murdered in the Port Arthur massacre, released a statement also condemning the choice to produce the film. The Police Association of Tasmania, the union for Tasmania Police, indicated it was worried how members of the union's mental health would be impacted. The Star Theatre in Launceston and the State Cinema in Hobart were the only cinemas in Tasmania to show the film. However, the State Cinema chose not to advertise the screenings.

The production company invited arts minister Elise Archer to meet, but she declined. Screen Tasmania declined to fund the film. The then-Premier of Tasmania, Peter Gutwein, stated to the House of Assembly that it made him uncomfortable. Other state politicians including Brian Mitchell, federal member for Lyons, and Rebecca White, Leader of the Opposition, expressed concern.

=== Accolades ===
Award	Ceremony date	Category	Subject	Result	Ref.
AACTA Awards	8 December 2021	Best Film	Nick Batzias, Shaun Grant, Virginia Whitwell and Justin Kurzel	Won	
AACTA Awards	8 December 2021	Best Direction	Justin Kurzel	Won	
AACTA Awards	8 December 2021	Best Original Screenplay	Shaun Grant	Won	
AACTA Awards	8 December 2021	Best Actor	Caleb Landry Jones	Won	
AACTA Awards	8 December 2021	Best Actress	Judy Davis	Won	
AACTA Awards	8 December 2021	Best Supporting Actor	Anthony LaPaglia	Won	
AACTA Awards	8 December 2021	Best Supporting Actress	Essie Davis	Won	
AACTA Awards	8 December 2021	Best Cinematography	Germain McMicking	Nominated	
AACTA Awards	8 December 2021	Best Editing	Nick Fenton	Won	
AACTA Awards	8 December 2021	Best Original Music Score	Jed Kurzel	Nominated	
AACTA Awards	8 December 2021	Best Sound	James Ashton, Dean Ryan and Steve Single	Nominated	
AACTA Awards	8 December 2021	Best Production Design	Alice Babidge	Nominated	
AACTA Awards	8 December 2021	Best Costume Design	Alice Babidge	Nominated	
AACTA Awards	8 December 2021	Best Hair and Makeup	Fiona Rees-Jones	Nominated	
AACTA Awards	8 December 2021	Best Casting	Nikki Barrett, Kate Leonard and Alison Telford	Nominated	
AACTA International Awards	26 January 2022	Best Film	Nitram	Nominated	
AACTA International Awards	26 January 2022	Best Direction	Justin Kurzel	Nominated	
AACTA International Awards	26 January 2022	Best Screenplay	Shaun Grant	Nominated	
AACTA International Awards	26 January 2022	Best Actor	Caleb Landry Jones	Nominated	
AWGIE Awards	7 December 2021	Best Screenplay, Feature Film – Original	Shaun Grant	Won	
Cannes Film Festival	6–17 July 2021	Palme d'Or	Justin Kurzel	Nominated	
Cannes Film Festival	6–17 July 2021	Best Actor	Caleb Landry Jones	Won	
CinefestOZ	August 2021	Film Prize	Nitram	Won	
NSW Premier's Literary Awards	16 May 2022	Best Script	Shaun Grant	Won	
