= List of awards and nominations received by Dev =

List of awards and nominations received by Dev may refer to:

- List of awards and nominations received by Dev (Bengali actor), accolades received by the Indian actor
- List of awards and nominations received by Dev (singer), accolades received by the American singer
- List of awards and nominations received by Dev Patel, accolades received by the British-Indian actor
