= Chinatown, Adelaide =

Neighborhood in Adelaide, Australia

Coordinates: 34.930°S 138.596°E

Chinatown 唐人街 (Chinese)
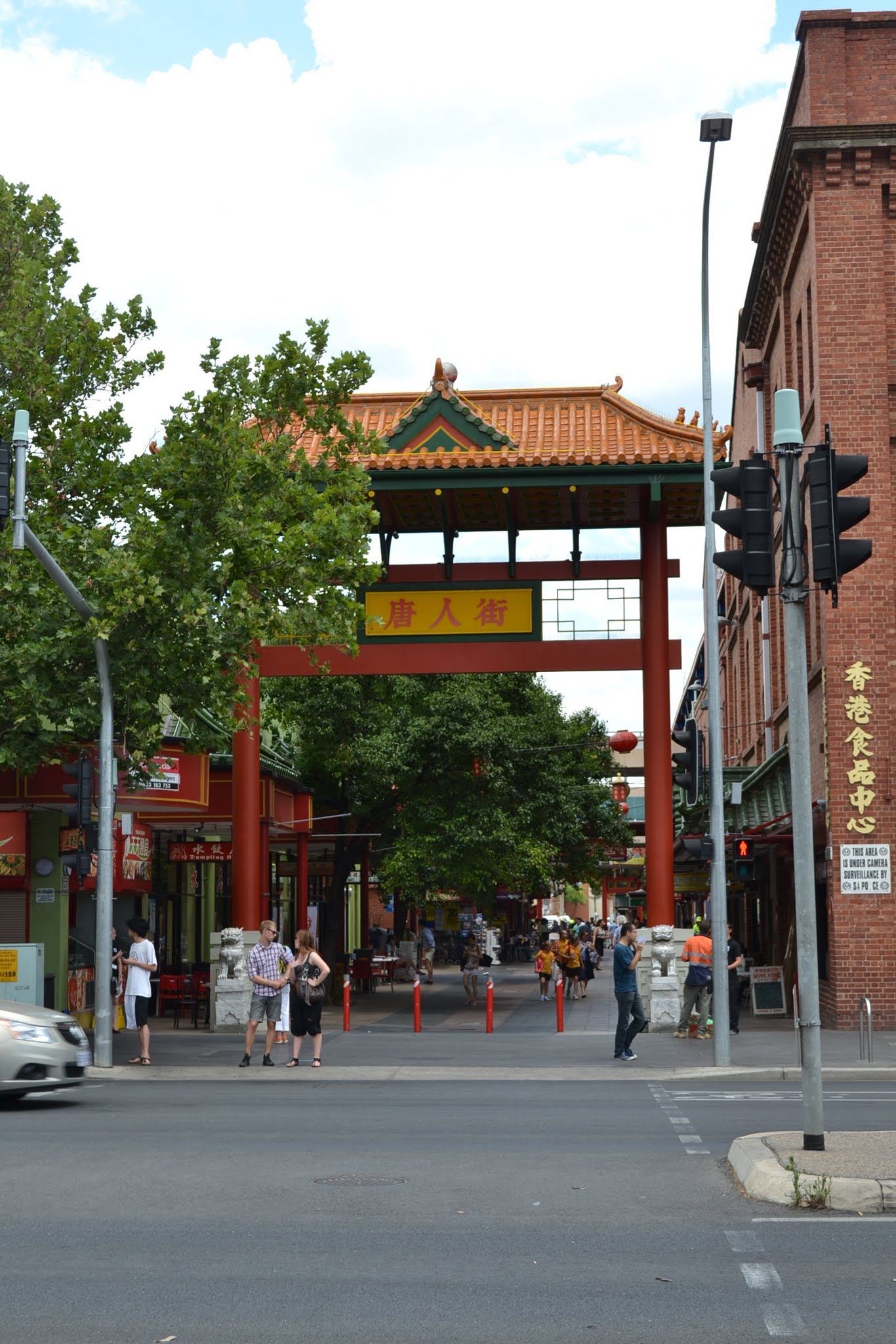
- Grote Street entrance to Chinatown, with the original paifang visible.
- Interactive map of Chinatown
- Country: Australia
- State: South Australia
- City: Adelaide
- LGA: City of Adelaide

Government
  - State electorate: Adelaide
  - Federal division: Adelaide

Adelaide Chinatown
- Chinese: 阿德雷得唐人街
Transcriptions
Standard Mandarin
- Hanyu Pinyin: Ā dé léi dé tángrénjiē

Chinatown in Adelaide, South Australia, Australia, also called Adelaide Chinatown (Chinese: 阿德雷得唐人街) or Moonta Street Chinatown, is located on Moonta Street, within the large Adelaide Central Markets precinct between Grote and Gouger streets in the Adelaide city centre. Two large Paifang, which were erected by the city council, are guarded by the Chinese guardian lions. They mark the entrances at either end. Adelaide Chinatown consists mainly of Chinese restaurants, grocery stores and markets but also consists of many non-Chinese Asian restaurants offering cuisines of Indian, Japanese, Korean, Malaysian, Nepali, Thai and Vietnamese origins.

== History ==
The first dozen Chinese labourers arrived from Singapore in Adelaide in 1847 to work as indentured shepherds. Many Chinese people disembarked in the port towns of South Australia before travelling overland to the Victorian goldfields due to immigration restrictions in Victoria.

Chinatown in Adelaide began to grow in the 1970s and 1980s with the influx of Asian migrants particularly from Vietnam. Produce was sold at the Central Market by market gardeners and this began the growth of the Asian food shops and cafés in the area. Pagoda style roofs, red lanterns, restaurants and grocery stores are found on Moonta Street, which is the centre of Chinatown. Paifang, which is a type of traditional Chinese archway, are at the opposite entrances of Moonta street and are guarded by Chinese lion statues which were donated by the Adelaide city council and by the Chinese government.

== Chinese New Year Celebrations ==
Chinatown Adelaide has hosted the official Chinese New Year Celebrations in Moonta Street since 2003. In 2013 the celebrations were expanded with the assistance of the Adelaide City Council and major sponsors to also include Gouger Street. Gouger street was closed to accommodate a street party with traditional performances, market stalls and a pop-up street restaurant.

== Gallery ==
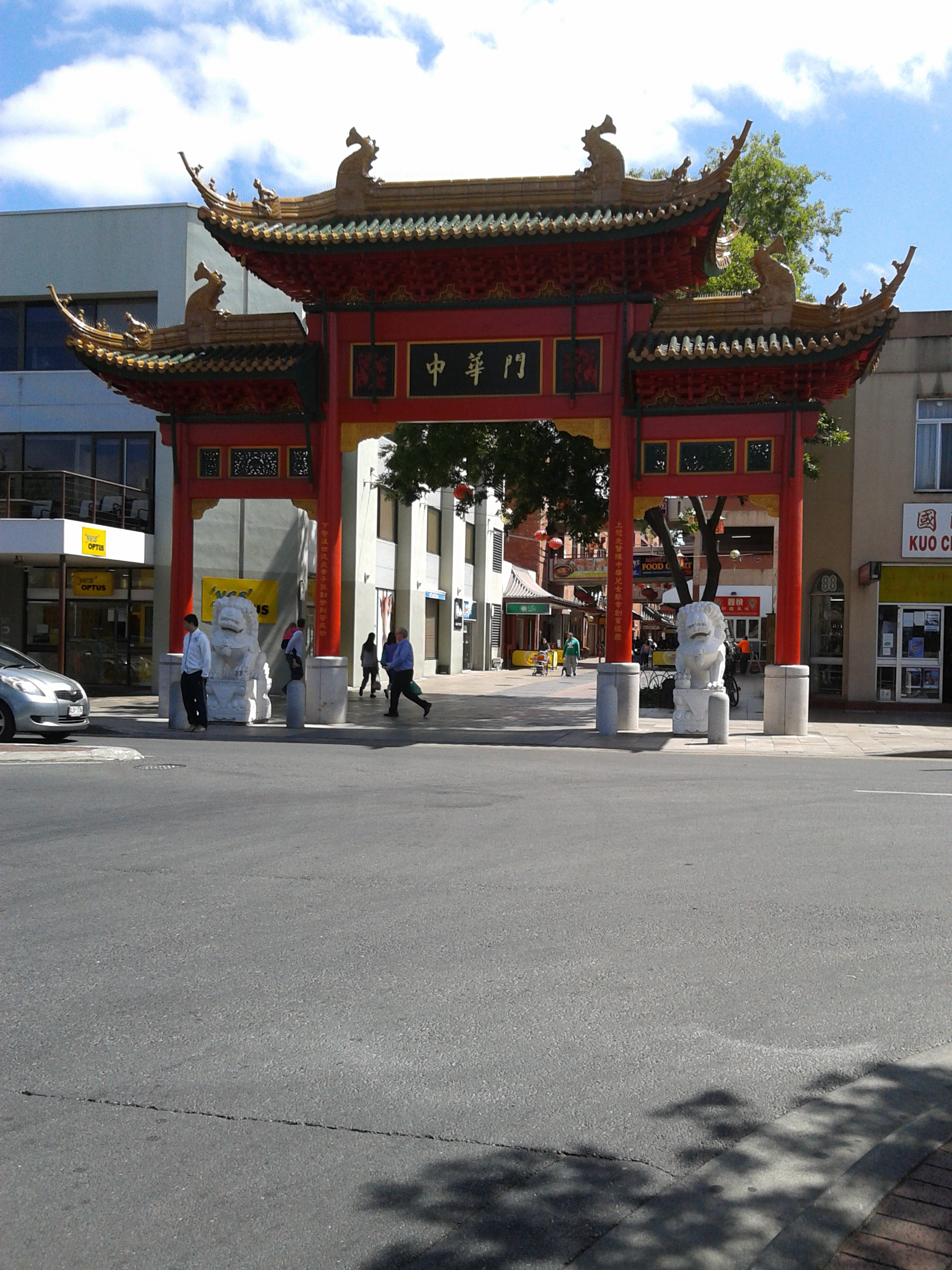
Another paifang at southern entrance

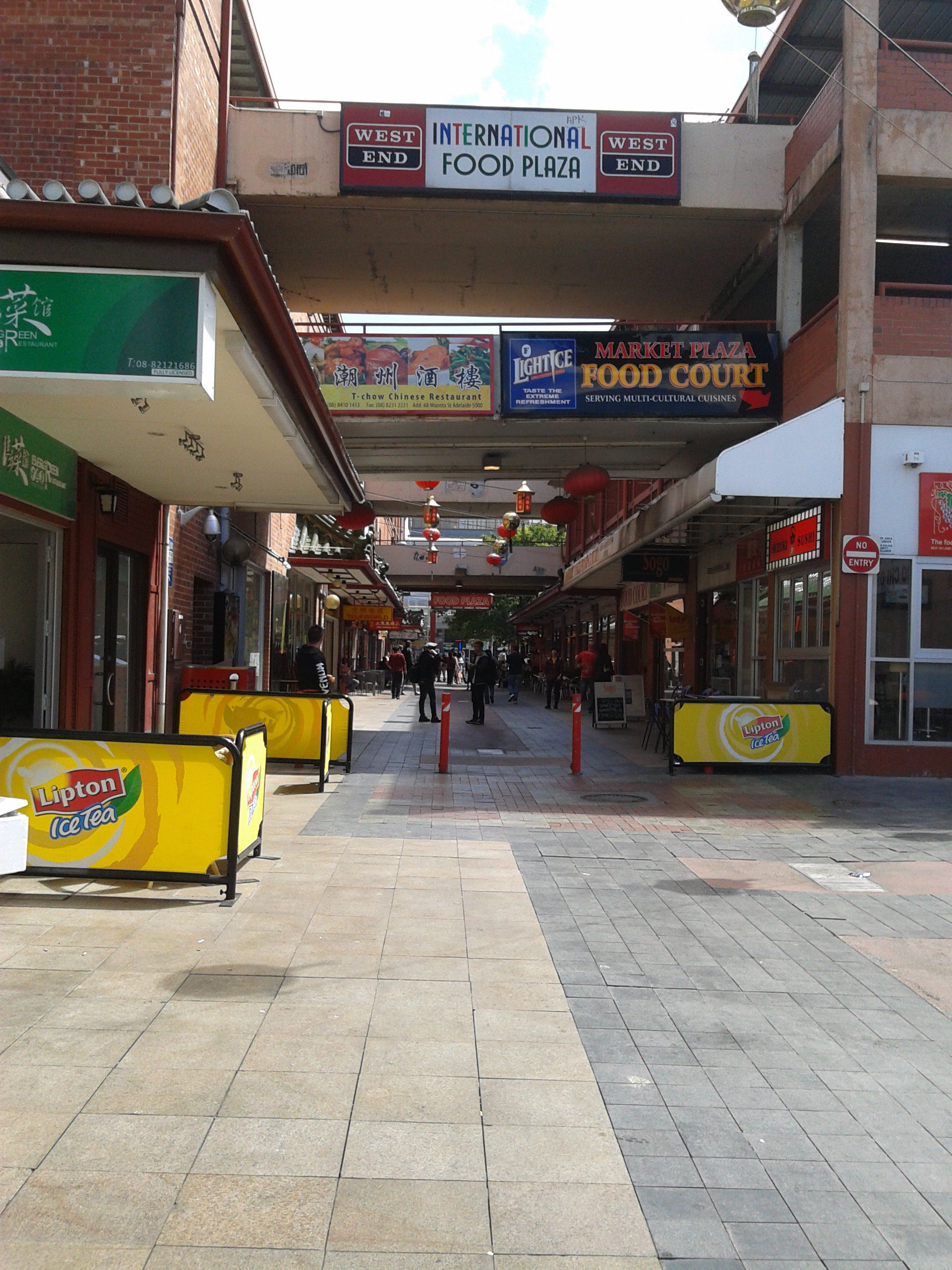
Main street view on Moonta Street

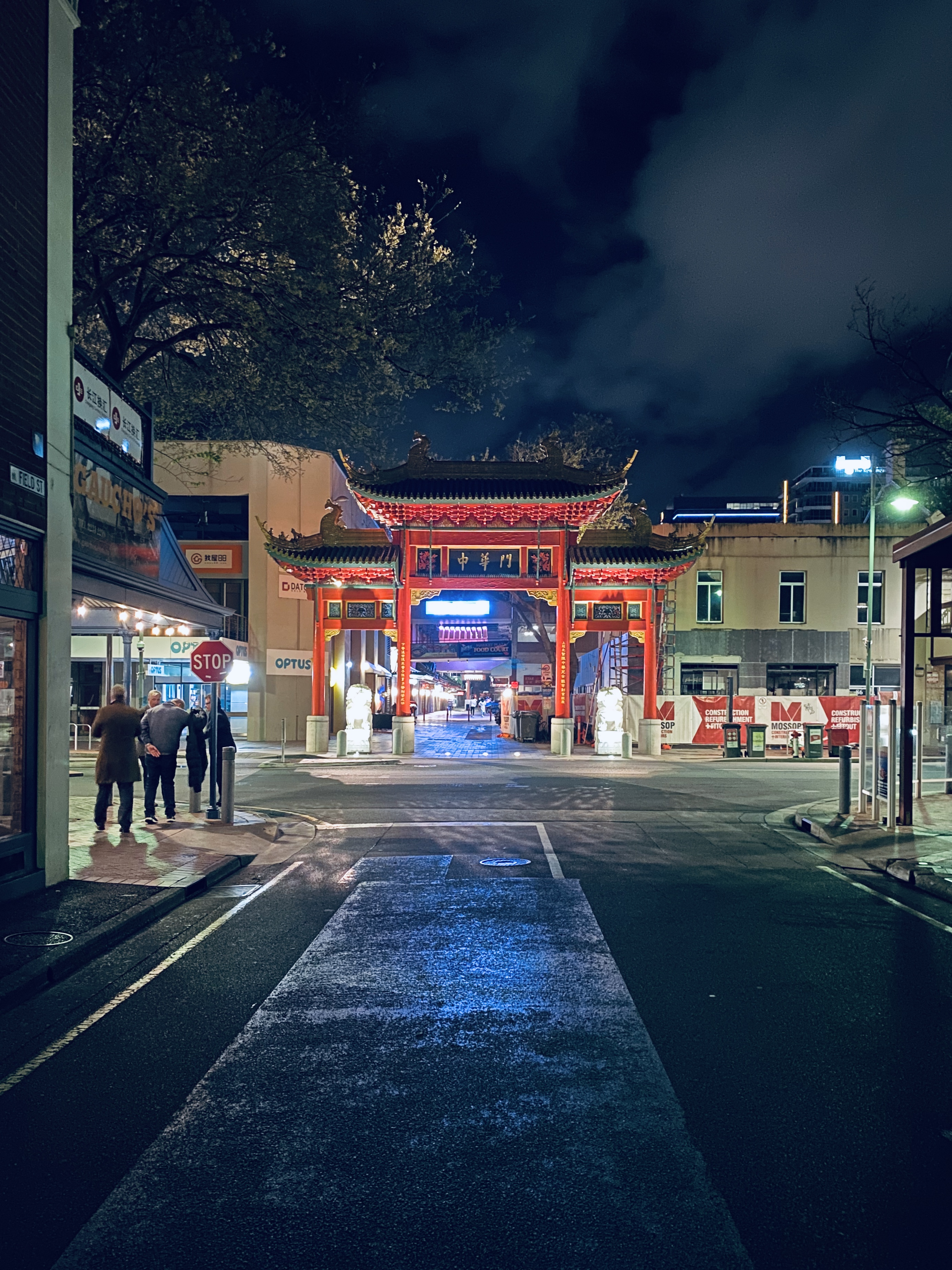
At night

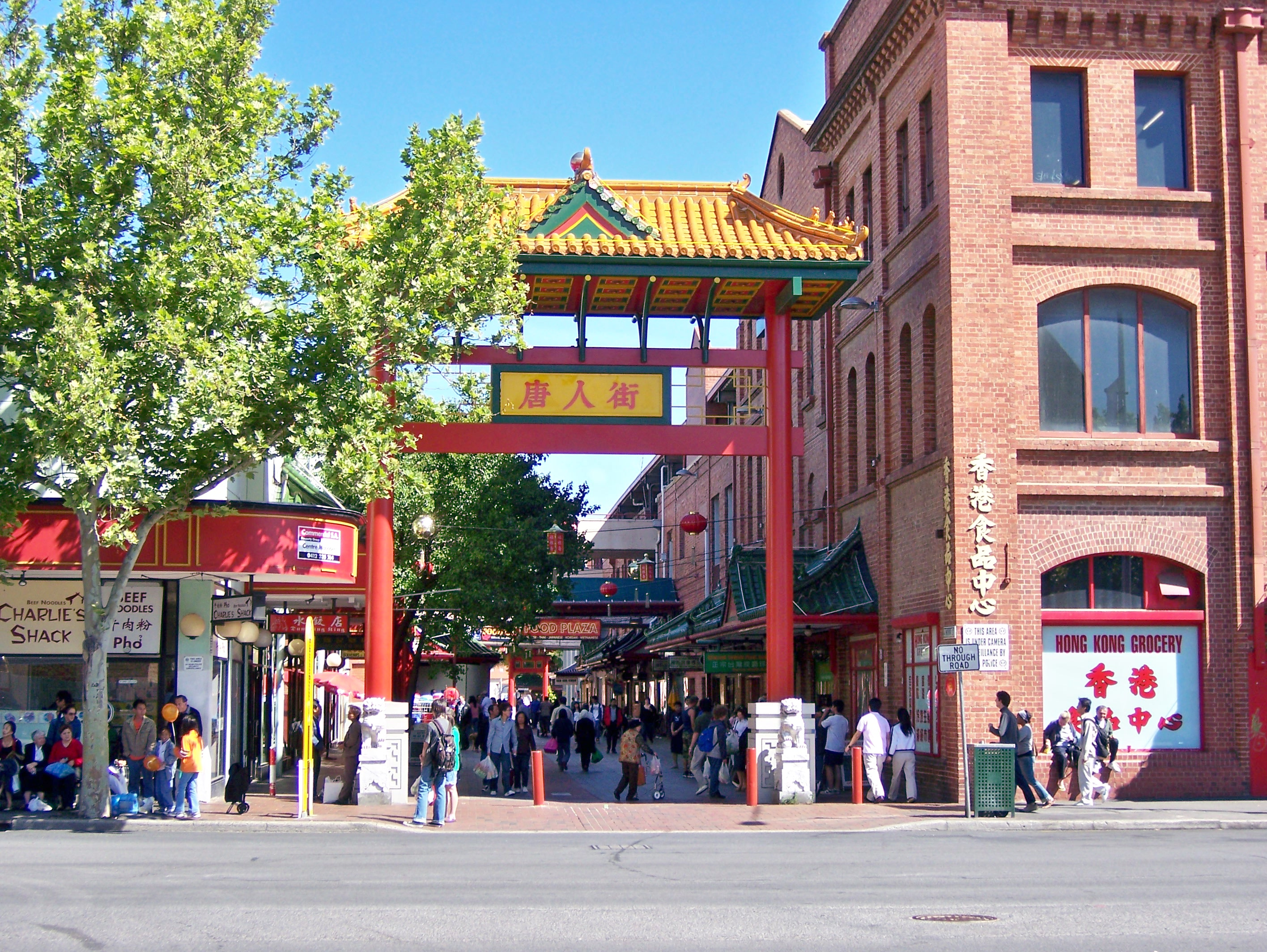
Grote Street entrance
