= Dev Patel =

English actor (born 1990)

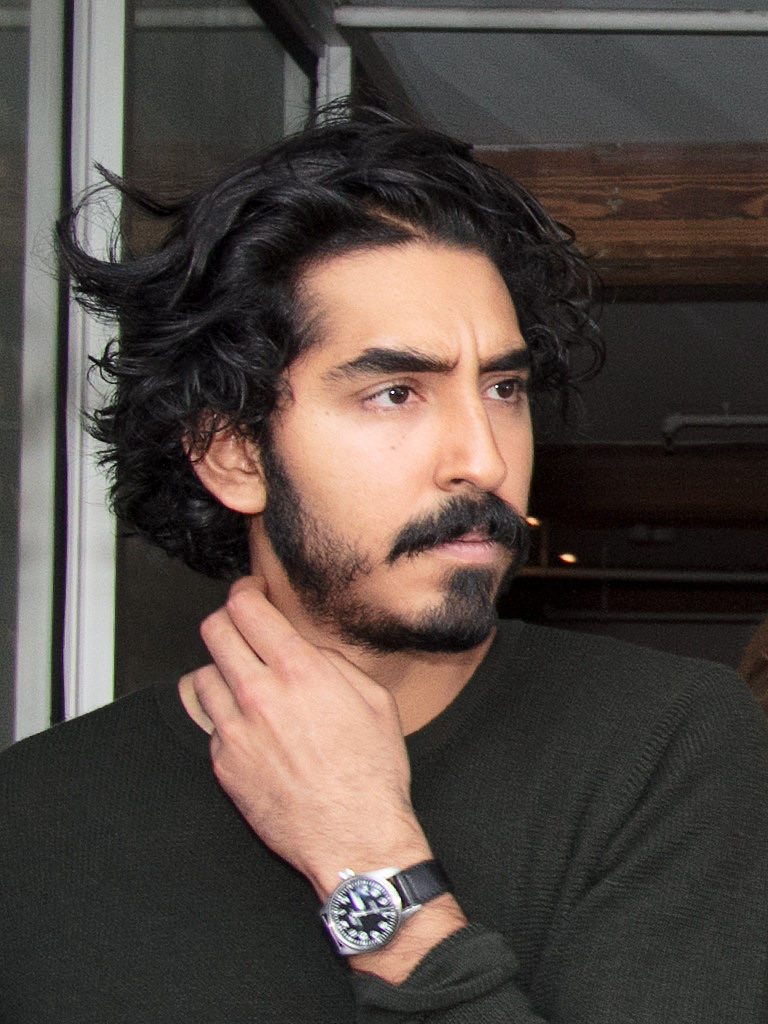
- Patel in 2016
- Born: 23 April 1990 (age 36); London, England
- Occupations: Actor; filmmaker
- Years active: 2006–present
- Notable credits: Slumdog Millionaire (2008); The Best Exotic Marigold Hotel (2011); The Second Best Exotic Marigold Hotel (2015); Lion (2016)
- Partners: Freida Pinto (2009–2014); Tilda Cobham-Hervey (2017–present)
- Awards: Full list

Dev Patel (/ˈdɛv pəˈtɛl/ DEV pə-TEL; born 23 April 1990) is a British actor and filmmaker. His accolades include a BAFTA Award, in addition to nominations for an Academy Award, two Golden Globe Awards, and a Primetime Emmy Award. Patel was included in Time's list of the 100 most influential people in the world in 2024.

Patel began his career playing Anwar Kharral in the E4 teen drama Skins (2007). His breakthrough role in Danny Boyle's drama Slumdog Millionaire (2008) earned Patel a nomination for the BAFTA Award for Best Actor in a Leading Role. He received a Golden Raspberry Award for Worst Supporting Actor nomination for his portrayal of Zuko in The Last Airbender (2010). His career expanded with leading roles in the comedy-dramas The Best Exotic Marigold Hotel (2011) and The Second Best Exotic Marigold Hotel (2015), the science fiction thriller Chappie (2015), and a supporting role in the HBO series The Newsroom (2012–2014).

For his performance as Saroo Brierley in the drama Lion (2016), Patel won the BAFTA Award for Best Actor in a Supporting Role and was nominated for the Academy Award for Best Supporting Actor. He subsequently starred in the independent films Hotel Mumbai (2018), The Personal History of David Copperfield (2019) and The Green Knight (2021), and made his directorial debut with the action film Monkey Man (2024).

== Early life and background ==
Dev Patel was born on 23 April 1990 in the London Borough of Harrow to Indian Gujarati parents born in Kenya. His mother, Anita Patel, was a care worker, and his father, Raju Patel, an IT consultant. His ancestors were from Jamnagar and Unjha in Gujarat. Patel's parents immigrated to the United Kingdom separately in their teens, and first met in London. Patel was raised in the Hindu faith. He speaks some Gujarati.

As a child, Patel became a fan of action movies after he sneaked downstairs and saw scenes from a Bruce Lee film on his parents' TV set. Patel grew up in the Rayners Lane district of Harrow and attended Longfield Primary School and Whitmore High School. Patel had his first acting role as Sir Andrew Aguecheek in the school's production of Twelfth Night. At Whitmore High, he received an A* in GCSE Drama for his "self-penned portrayal of a child in the Beslan school siege." His drama teacher Niamh Wright said, "Dev was a gifted student, who quickly impressed me with his innate ability to communicate a wide variety of characters imaginatively and creatively. He was awarded full marks for his GCSE performance to a live audience, and the visiting examiner was moved to tears by his honest portrayal." He completed his A Levels in PE, Biology, History, and Drama in 2007 at Whitmore High School while working on Skins.

Patel said that he was "bloody energetic" as a child, and used to get in trouble because of it. He started training at the Rayners Lane Academy of Taekwondo in 2000. He competed regularly in both national and international championships, including the 2004 AIMAA (Action International Martial Arts Association) World Championships in Dublin, where he won a bronze medal. The World Championships took place in October 2004, when he competed as a red belt in the junior division against other red and black belts. He made it to the semi-finals, where he lost to an Irish black belt, named Niall Fitzmaurice, in "a very close and tough fight" and ended up winning a bronze medal. Later, in March 2006, he earned a 1st dan black belt.

== Career ==
=== 2006–2007: Early work ===
In 2006, Patel's professional acting career began when he auditioned for the E4 teen drama television series Skins. His mother saw the casting advertisement in Metro and took him to the audition, even though he had a science exam the next day. After two auditions, he was cast in the role of Anwar Kharral, a British Pakistani Muslim teenager. The characterisation of Anwar was partly based on Patel's own personality, as the role was developed specifically for him once he was cast in Skins. With no prior professional acting experience, Patel recalled that, on "the first day of shooting, I didn't really know what to do."

The first series of the show aired in January 2007 and went on to win the Rose d'Or for Drama in 2008 and receive a nomination for Best Drama Series at the 2008 BAFTA Television Awards. Patel reprised his role as Anwar for the second series of Skins, which aired in February 2008. The second series of Skins won the Philips Audience Award at the 2009 BAFTA Television Awards.

=== 2008–2010: Breakthrough and critical acclaim ===
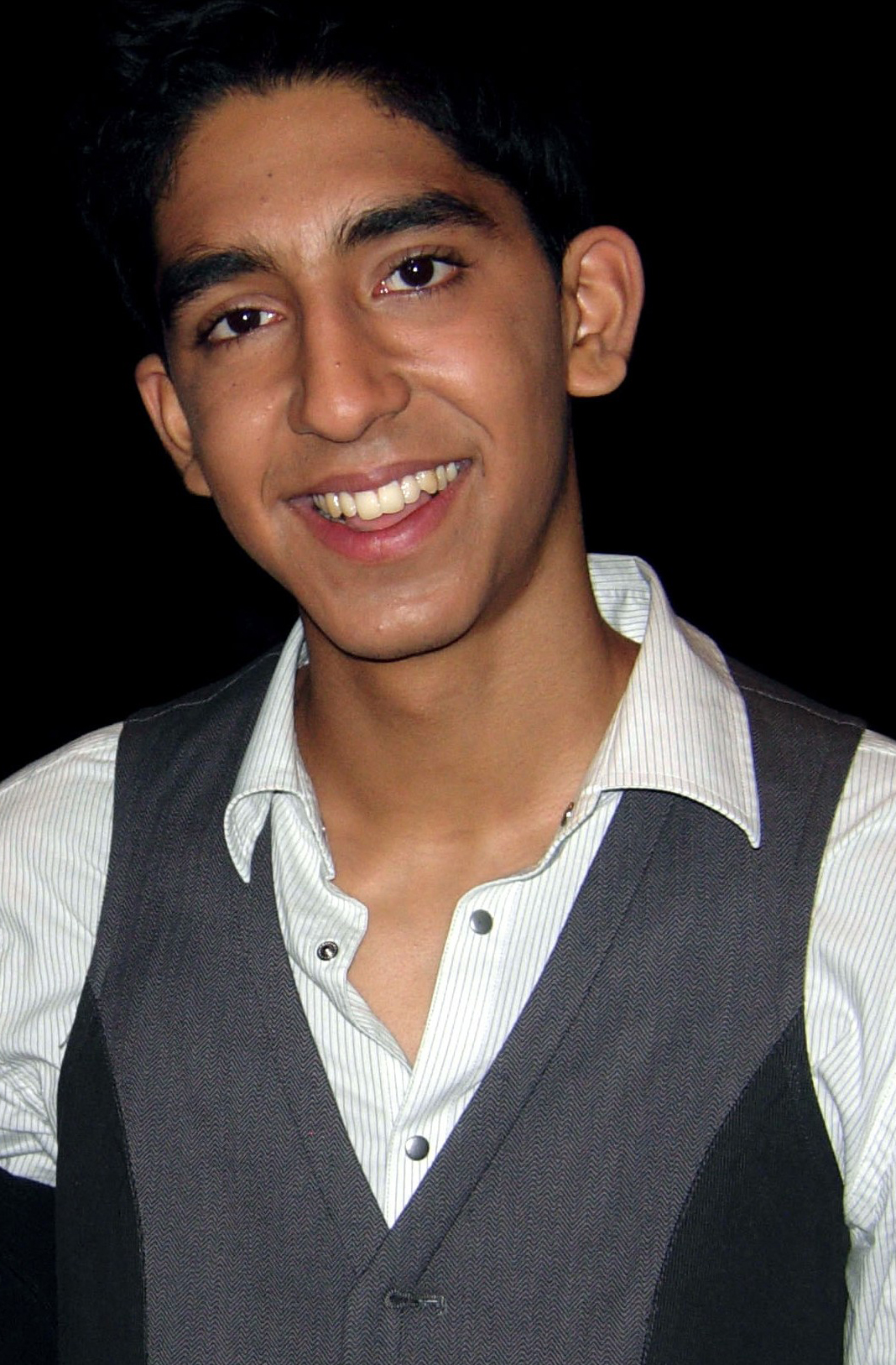
Patel in 2008

Patel made his feature film debut when he was cast in the role of Jamal Malik, the central character in Danny Boyle's film Slumdog Millionaire. The Jamal Malik character is an Indian Muslim boy born and brought up in the poverty of Bombay, India. Boyle considered hundreds of young male actors, but found that Bollywood leads were generally "strong, handsome hero-types", not the personality he was looking for. Boyle's 17-year-old daughter Caitlin pointed him to Skins.

After five auditions for the role, Patel was eventually cast in August 2007. The film's producer found the original choice for the lead role, Ruslaan Mumtaz, too good-looking for the role. Boyle said, "I wanted a guy who didn't look like a potential hero; I wanted him to earn that in the film." To prepare for the role, Patel went along with Boyle while scouting for filming locations, where he was able to observe the Dharavi slums for himself. He also worked at a call-centre for a day and in a hotel, where he washed dishes.

After the release of Slumdog Millionaire at the end of 2008, Patel went on to receive a number of awards for his performance, including a British Independent Film Award, National Board of Review (NBR) Award, Chicago Film Critics Association Award, and two Black Reel Awards for Best Actor and Best Breakthrough Performance. Patel was also nominated for Outstanding Performance by a Male Actor in a Supporting Role at the 2009 Screen Actors Guild (SAG) Awards. The award eventually went posthumously to Heath Ledger for his performance in The Dark Knight, though Patel did win the Screen Actors Guild Award for Outstanding Performance by a Cast in a Motion Picture, which he shared with ten other cast members from Slumdog Millionaire. On 8 January 2009, Patel won the Critics' Choice Award for Best Young Performer. He was also nominated for two London Critics Circle Film Awards, the NAACP Image Award for Outstanding Supporting Actor, the 2009 BAFTA Award for Best Leading Actor, and European Film Award for Best Actor. The film itself won four Golden Globes, including Best Drama Film, and eight Academy Awards, including Best Picture.

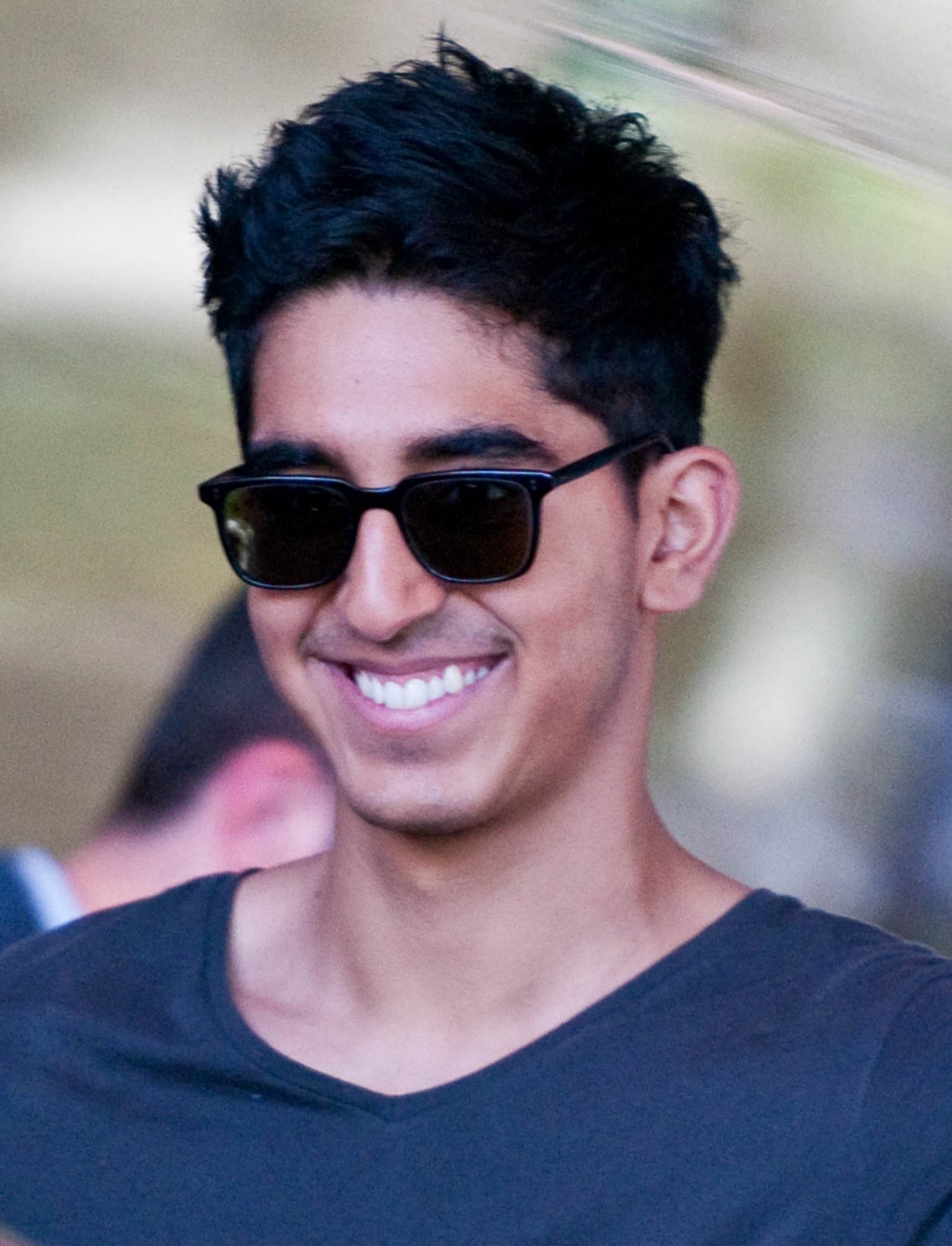
Patel at the 2011 Toronto International Film Festival

Patel played Zuko in M. Night Shyamalan's The Last Airbender, a feature film adaptation of the animated series Avatar: The Last Airbender, which was released on 1 July 2010 to extremely negative reviews. Being a box-office disappointment, the film was a critical failure and Patel even received a Worst Supporting Actor nomination that year. He expressed regret and dislike for his role and his experience with the film. He described his performance as Prince Zuko as being as though he "saw a stranger on the screen that I couldn't relate to."

Patel later starred in the short film The Commuter, which was directed by McHenry Brothers to promote the Nokia N8 smartphone in the UK Fans who won a Nokia UK run competition starred alongside Dev Patel in the short film.

=== 2011–2020: Established actor ===
Patel co-starred in The Best Exotic Marigold Hotel (2012), (and subsequently in its 2015 sequel, The Second Best Exotic Marigold Hotel) directed by John Madden, which received positive reviews and was a box office success, grossing $136 million. For the role, he had to take lessons in perfecting an Indian-English accent.

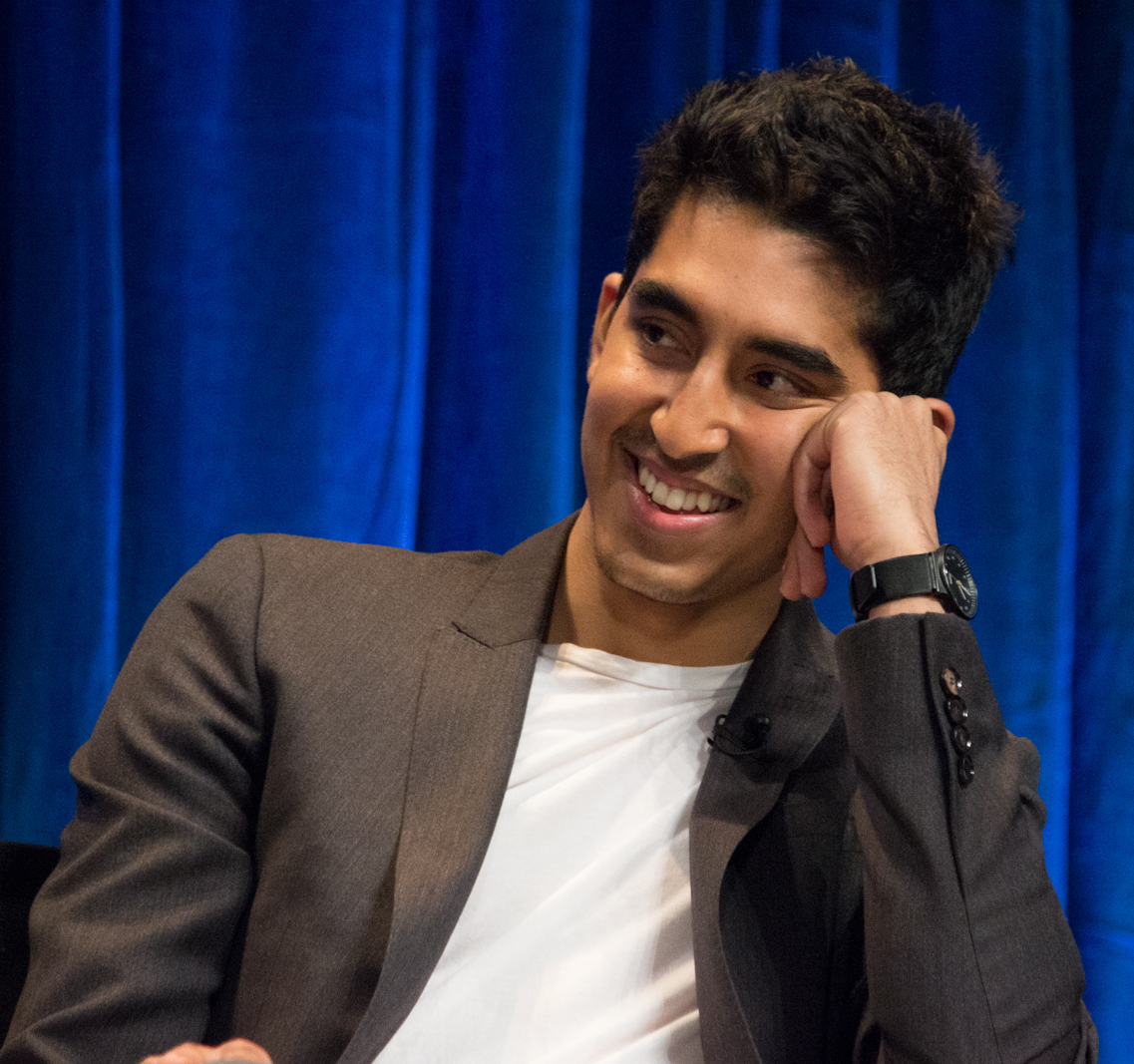
Patel in 2013

From 2012 to 2014, Patel had a supporting role in the 2012 HBO television series The Newsroom as Neal Sampat, blogger for news anchor Will McAvoy. He also appeared alongside James Franco and Heather Graham in About Cherry, which premiered at the 2012 Berlin International Film Festival. In 2014, Patel starred alongside Robert Sheehan and Zoë Kravitz in the film, The Road Within, about three unlikely friends with various disabilities who go on a road trip. The film received generally mixed reviews. Variety had positive words for the "bristling and committed performances by Robert Sheehan, Dev Patel and Zoe Kravitz" while noting that "there remains a nagging tidiness to the whole endeavour that leaves a strained, cloying aftertaste" that kept the movie from truly succeeding.

In 2015, Patel acted in Chappie as an engineer who helps design police robots and as the mathematician Srinivasa Ramanujan in the biopic The Man Who Knew Infinity. In 2016, Patel starred as Saroo Brierley in the biographical film Lion, directed by Garth Davis and co-starring Nicole Kidman and Rooney Mara, which premiered to rave reviews and "Oscar buzz" at the 2016 Toronto International Film Festival. The film is based on Brierley's memoir A Long Way Home. Patel was nominated for Best Supporting Actor for his role at the 70th British Academy Film Awards and the 89th Academy Awards, winning at the former. He is the third actor of Indian descent to receive an Oscar nomination.

In 2018, Patel starred in the action-thriller Hotel Mumbai and The Wedding Guest. In 2019, Patel starred as the titular character in Armando Iannucci's adaptation of Charles Dickens' The Personal History of David Copperfield, for which he received a nomination for the 2021 Golden Globe Award for Best Actor – Motion Picture Musical or Comedy. He also returned to television in an episode of the Amazon Prime anthology Modern Love, for which he received an Emmy nomination.

=== 2020–present: Expansion into directing ===
In 2021, Patel starred in The Green Knight, based on Sir Gawain and the Green Knight, directed by David Lowery. In April of that year, he signed a deal to "produce, develop and create projects" with ShivHans Pictures. Towards the end of 2021, Patel established his own production company, Minor Realm. In 2023, Patel appeared in Wes Anderson's The Wonderful Story of Henry Sugar, an adaptation of a short story by Roald Dahl, starring opposite Benedict Cumberbatch, Ralph Fiennes, and Ben Kingsley.

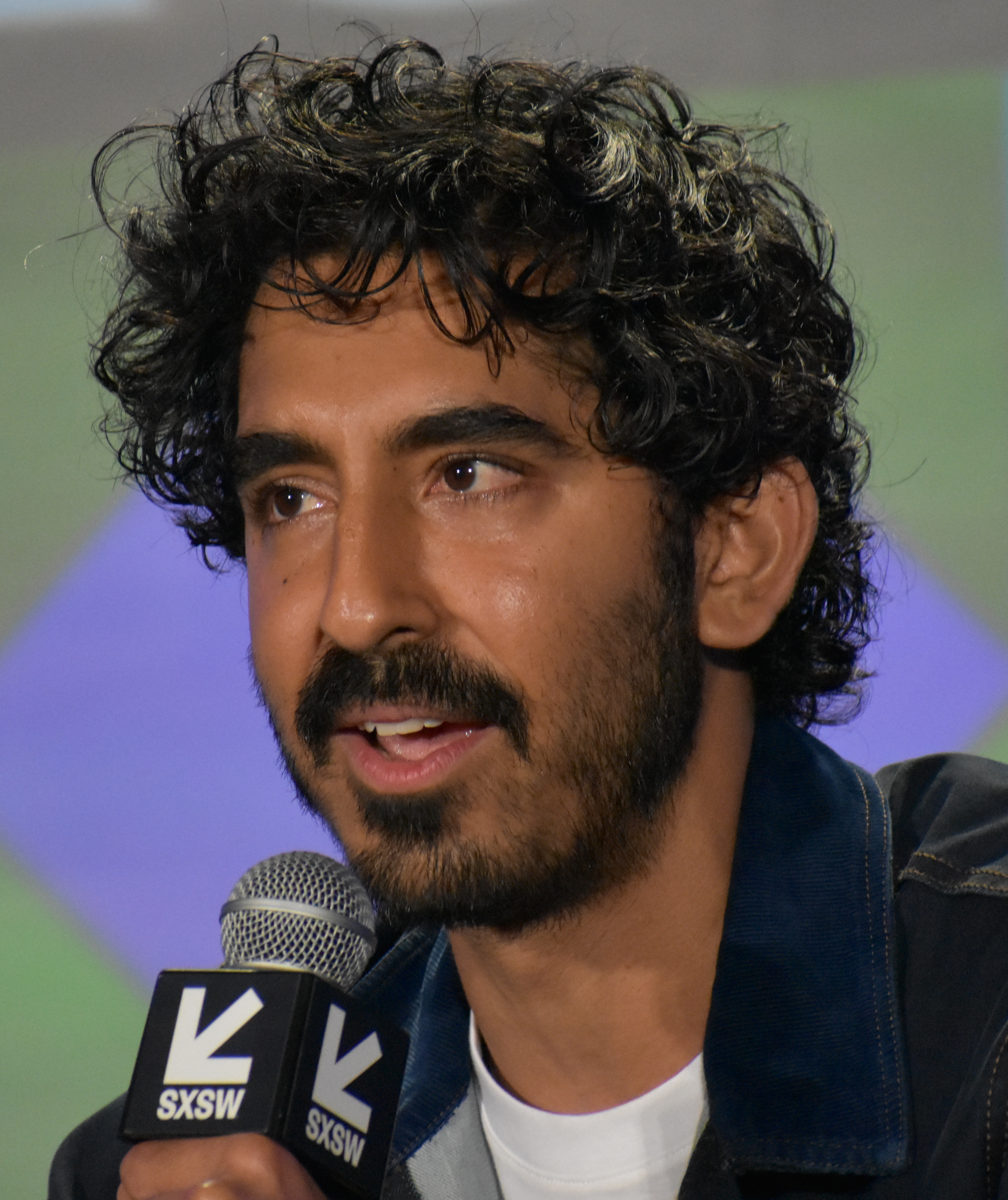
Patel at the South by Southwest Festival (SXSW) 2024

Patel made his directorial debut with the 2024 action thriller film Monkey Man, as announced in 2018. In addition to directing, Patel stars in the film, and is credited as a co-writer and producer. The film was initially set to be distributed by Netflix, but Jordan Peele, having seen the film, felt that it deserved a theatrical release instead, so he acquired it from Netflix under his Monkeypaw Productions banner. Monkey Man had its world premiere at South by Southwest on 11 March 2024. It had its Sydney premiere on 2 April 2024, and was released in Australian cinemas on 4 April 2024. It was released by Universal Pictures in the US on 5 April 2024.

Patel will executive produce and star in the Miramax miniseries The Key Man as disgraced businessman Arif Naqvi, and was initially set to join Olivia Colman in Wicker before dropping out.

== Personal life ==
Patel began dating his Slumdog Millionaire co-star Freida Pinto in 2009. On 10 December 2014, the couple announced that they had split after nearly six years of dating. In March 2017, Patel's relationship with Australian actress Tilda Cobham-Hervey became public. They met nine months earlier on the set of Hotel Mumbai. In April 2022 they moved to Cobham-Hervey's home town, Adelaide. The couple posed for photographs together for the first time on the red carpet at the Los Angeles premiere of Patel's debut feature as a director, Monkey Man, on 2 April 2024.

In August 2022, Patel was featured in local Australian news after he broke up a knife fight in Gouger Street in Adelaide.

== Filmography ==
=== Film ===
Year	Title	Role	Director	Ref.
2008	Slumdog Millionaire	Jamal Malik	Danny Boyle	
2010	The Last Airbender	Zuko	M. Night Shyamalan	
2011	The Best Exotic Marigold Hotel	Sonny Kapoor	John Madden	
2012	About Cherry	Andrew	Stephen Elliott	
2014	The Road Within	Alex	Gren Wells	
2015	The Second Best Exotic Marigold Hotel	Sonny Kapoor	John Madden	
2015	Chappie	Deon Wilson	Neill Blomkamp	
2015	The Man Who Knew Infinity	Srinivasa Ramanujan	Matthew Brown	
2016	Only Yesterday	Toshio (voice, English dub)	Isao Takahata	
2016	Lion	Saroo Brierley	Garth Davis	
2018	Hotel Mumbai	Arjun	Anthony Maras	
2018	The Wedding Guest	Jay	Michael Winterbottom	
2019	I Lost My Body	Naoufel (voice, English dub)	Jérémy Clapin	
2019	The Personal History of David Copperfield	David Copperfield	Armando Iannucci	
2021	The Green Knight	Gawain	David Lowery	
2023	The Wonderful Story of Henry Sugar	Dr. Chatterjee / John Winston	Wes Anderson	Short film
2023	Poison	Timber Woods	Wes Anderson	Short film
2024	Monkey Man	Kid	Himself	Directorial debut
2025	Rabbit Trap	Darcy Davenport	Bryn Chainey	
TBA	The Peasant		Himself	Post-production

=== Television ===
Year	Title	Role	Notes	Ref.
2007–2008	Skins	Anwar Kharral	18 episodes	
2009	Mister Eleven	Hotel Waiter	Episode: "1.1"	
2012–2014	The Newsroom	Neal Sampat	25 episodes	
2019	Modern Love	Joshua	2 episodes	
2019	India From Above	Narrator	Voice, 2 episodes	

=== Video games ===
Year	Title	Role	Notes	Ref.
2010	The Last Airbender	Zuko	Voice	

== See also ==
- List of Academy Award winners and nominees from Great Britain
- List of actors with Academy Award nominations
