= List of awards and nominations received by Dev Patel =

Dev Patel awards and nominations
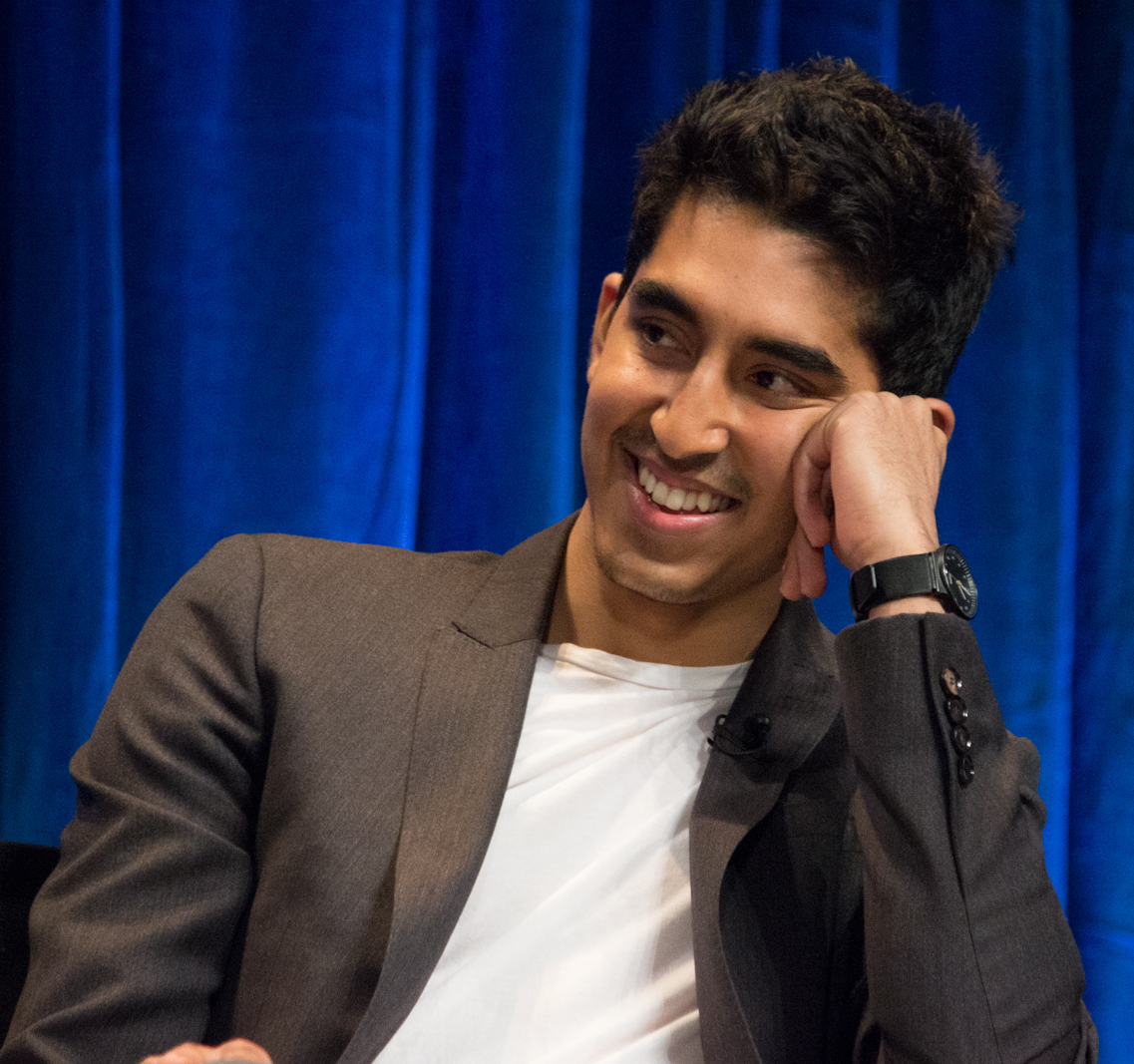
- Patel at PaleyFest in 2013
Awards and nominations
Award	Wins	Nominations
Golden Globe	0	2
Academy Awards	0	1
BAFTA Awards	1	2
Chicago Film Critics Association	1	1
Emmy Awards	0	1
Screen Actors Guild Awards	1	4

Totals (Note: Certain award groups do not simply award one winner. They acknowledge several different recipients, have runners-up, and have third place. Since this is a specific recognition and is different from losing an award, runner-up mentions are considered wins in this award tally. For simplification and to avoid errors, each award in this list has been presumed to have had a prior nomination.)
- Wins: 13
- Nominations: 36

British actor Dev Patel made his screen debut as Anwar Kharral in the first two seasons of the British television teen drama Skins (2007–08), landing the role with no prior professional acting experience. His breakthrough came in 2008, when he played the lead role in Danny Boyle's Best Picture drama Slumdog Millionaire as Jamal Malik, which earned him BAFTA and SAG Award nominations for Best Actor and Best Supporting Actor, respectively. Patel went on to star in the universally panned 2010 fantasy film The Last Airbender, followed by the commercially successful romantic comedy and surprise box-office hit, The Best Exotic Marigold Hotel (2012)—the former earned him a Golden Raspberry Award for Worst Supporting Actor nomination. Returning to the small screen, Patel starred in the HBO television series The Newsroom (2012–14) and received an NAACP Image Award nomination for Outstanding Supporting Actor in a Drama Series for his portrayal of the character Neal Sampat.

In 2015, Patel reprised his role as Sonny Kapoor in The Second Best Exotic Marigold Hotel (sequel to the 2012 film), led the science fiction crime thriller film Chappie, and portrayed the mathematician Srinivasa Ramanujan in the biopic The Man Who Knew Infinity to a mostly positive reception. The following year, he played Saroo Brierley in the biographical drama Lion (2016) and won the BAFTA Award for Best Supporting Actor—his performance garnered additional nominations for an Academy Award, a Golden Globe, and a SAG Award, which he did not win. For his portrayal of David Copperfield in the 2019 comedy-drama The Personal History of David Copperfield, Patel earned his second BIFA and Golden Globe nominations, for Best Actor and Best Actor in a Motion Picture – Musical or Comedy respectively.

In 2020, Patel appeared in the Amazon Prime Video anthology series Modern Love as Joshua, a successful young entrepreneur, and received his first Primetime Emmy Award nomination for Outstanding Guest Actor in a Comedy Series at the 72nd ceremony.

== Awards and nominations ==
Name of the award ceremony, year presented, nominee(s) of the award, category, and the result of the nomination
Organization	Year	Work	Category	Result	Ref(s)
AACTA Awards	2016	Lion	Best International Supporting Actor	Won	
AACTA Awards	2017	Lion	Best Supporting Actor	Won	
AACTA Awards	2019	Hotel Mumbai	Best Actor	Nominated	
Academy Awards	2017	Lion	Best Supporting Actor	Nominated	
Asia Pacific Screen Awards	2016	Lion	Best Actor in a Leading Role	Nominated	
BAFTA Awards	2009	Slumdog Millionaire	Best Actor in a Leading Role	Nominated	
BAFTA Awards	2017	Lion	Best Actor in a Supporting Role	Won	
Black Reel Awards	2008	Slumdog Millionaire	Best Actor	Won	
Black Reel Awards	2008	Slumdog Millionaire	Best Breakthrough Performance	Won	
British Independent Film Awards	2008	Slumdog Millionaire	Most Promising Newcomer	Won	
British Independent Film Awards	2019	The Personal History of David Copperfield	Best Actor	Nominated	
Chicago Film Critics Association Awards	2008	Slumdog Millionaire	Most Promising Performer	Won	
Critics' Choice Awards	2008	Slumdog Millionaire	Best Young Actor in a Movie	Won	
Critics' Choice Awards	2016	Lion	Best Supporting Actor in a Movie	Nominated	
Critics' Choice Super Awards	2022	The Green Knight	Best Actor in a Science Fiction/Fantasy Movie	Won	
Primetime Emmy Awards	2020	Modern Love	Outstanding Guest Actor in a Comedy Series	Nominated	
Evening Standard British Film Awards	2016	Lion	Best Actor	Nominated	
Golden Globe Awards	2017	Lion	Best Supporting Actor – Motion Picture	Nominated	
Golden Globe Awards	2021	The Personal History of David Copperfield	Best Actor – Motion Picture Musical or Comedy	Nominated	
Golden Raspberry Awards	2010	The Last Airbender	Worst Supporting Actor	Nominated	
Houston Film Critics Society Awards	2016	Lion	Best Supporting Actor	Nominated	
Los Angeles Italia Film Festival	2017	Lion	Best Supporting Actor	Won	
MTV Movie Awards	2009	Slumdog Millionaire	MTV Movie Award for Best Kiss (shared with Freida Pinto)	Nominated	
MTV Movie Awards	2009	Slumdog Millionaire	MTV Movie Award for Best Male Breakthrough Performance	Nominated	
NAACP Image Awards	2009	Slumdog Millionaire	Outstanding Supporting Actor in a Motion Picture	Nominated	
NAACP Image Awards	2013	The Newsroom	Outstanding Supporting Actor in a Drama Series	Nominated	
National Board of Review Awards	2008	Slumdog Millionaire	Best Breakthrough Performance	Won	
Santa Barbara International Film Festival	2016	Lion	Virtuosos Award	Won	
Satellite Awards	2017	Lion	Best Supporting Actor in a Motion Picture	Nominated	
Satellite Awards	2021	The Personal History of David Copperfield	Best Actor – Motion Picture Musical or Comedy	Nominated	
Saturn Awards	2008	Slumdog Millionaire	Best Performance by a Younger Actor	Nominated	
Screen Actors Guild Awards	2009	Slumdog Millionaire	Outstanding Performance by a Cast in a Motion Picture	Won	
Screen Actors Guild Awards	2009	Slumdog Millionaire	Outstanding Performance by a Male Actor in a Supporting Role	Nominated	
Screen Actors Guild Awards	2012	The Best Exotic Marigold Hotel	Outstanding Performance by a Cast in a Motion Picture	Nominated	
Screen Actors Guild Awards	2016	Lion	Outstanding Performance by a Male Actor in a Supporting Role	Nominated	
St. Louis Film Critics Association Awards	2016	Lion	Best Supporting Actor	Nominated	

== See also ==
- List of accolades received by Slumdog Millionaire
- List of accolades received by Lion
