= List of accolades received by Lion (2016 film) =

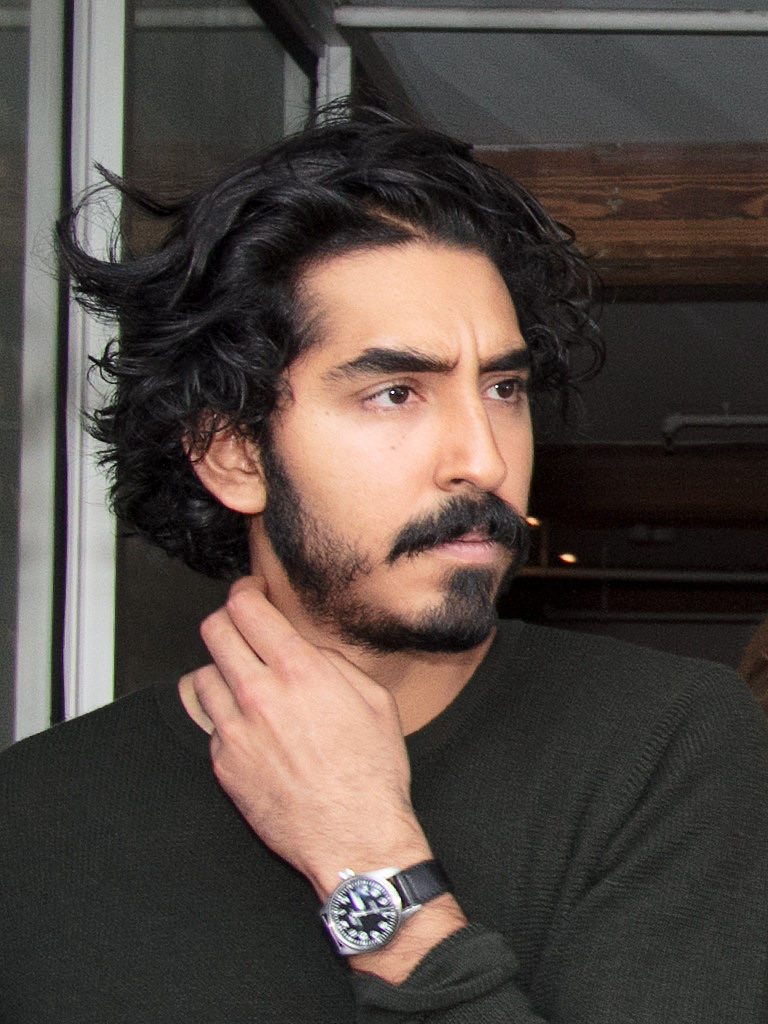
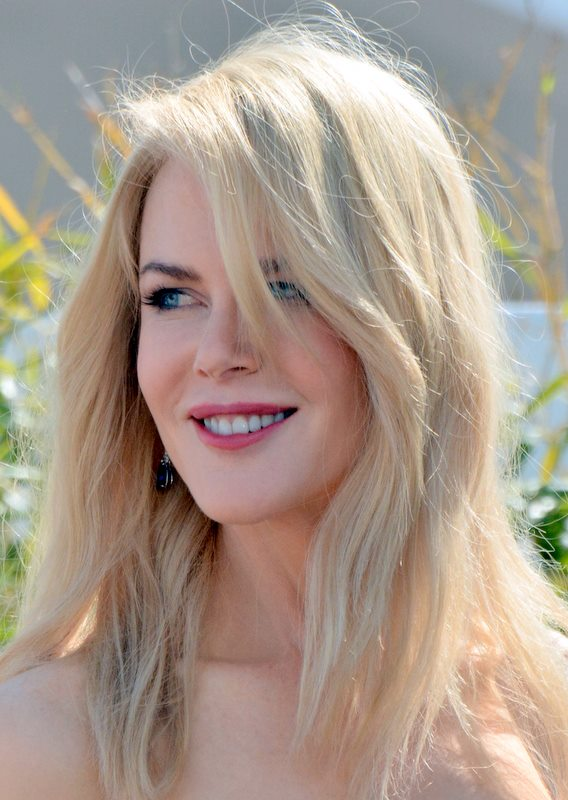
- Dev Patel and Nicole Kidman were praised for their performances, receiving Academy Award nominations for Best Supporting Actor and Best Supporting Actress, respectively.
Accolades
Award	Won	Nominated	Standing
AACTA International Awards	2	5
AARP Movies for Grownups Awards	0	3
Academy Awards	0	6
African-American Film Critics Association	0	1	4th place
Alliance of Women Film Journalists	0	1
American Society of Cinematographers	1	1
Art Directors Guild Awards	0	1
Asia Pacific Screen Awards	1	2
Austin Film Critics Association	0	1
Austin Film Festival	1	1
British Academy Film Awards	2	5
Camerimage	1	1
Chicago International Film Festival	1	1
Costume Designers Guild	0	1
Critics' Choice Awards	0	6
Denver Film Festival	1	1
Directors Guild of America Awards	1	2
Evening Standard British Film Awards	1	2
Golden Globe Awards	0	4
Heartland Film Festival	1	1
Hollywood Film Awards	1	1
Hollywood Music in Media Awards	0	1
Houston Film Critics Society	0	2
Location Managers Guild Awards	0	1
Mill Valley Film Festival	1	1
NAACP Image Awards	0	2
Palm Springs International Film Festival	1	1
Producers Guild of America Awards	0	1
San Diego Film Critics Society	0	2
Santa Barbara International Film Festival	1	1
Satellite Awards	0	5
Saturn Awards	0	1
Screen Actors Guild Awards	0	2
St. Louis Film Critics Association	0	2
Toronto International Film Festival	0	1	1st Runner-up
USC Scripter Awards	0	1
Virginia Film Festival	1	1
Washington D.C. Area Film Critics Association	0	2
- Total number of awards and nominations
Totals	31	55	
- References

Lion is a 2016 Australian biographical film directed by Garth Davis (in his feature debut) and written by Luke Davies, based on the non-fiction book A Long Way Home by Saroo Brierley with Larry Buttrose. Starring Sunny Pawar, Dev Patel, Rooney Mara, David Wenham and Nicole Kidman, the film focuses on Saroo Brierley, separated from his biological mother and adopted by an Australian couple, searched his biological mother via Google Earth. The film had its world premiere at the Toronto International Film Festival on 10 September 2016. The film was given a limited theatrical release on 25 November 2016, by The Weinstein Company before opening generally on 6 January 2017. The film was released in Australia on 19 January 2017 and in the United Kingdom on 20 January 2017. The film was released to positive reviews, with a Rotten Tomatoes approval rating of 84%, based on 269 reviews, and an average rating of 7.3/10. Metacritic lists a score of 69 out of 100, based on 45 reviews.

Lion received six nominations at the 89th Academy Awards, including Best Picture, Best Supporting Actor for Patel, Best Supporting Actress for Kidman, Best Adapted Screenplay, Best Original Score and Best Cinematography. At the British Academy Film Awards, the film won the BAFTA Award for Best Actor in a Supporting Role for Patel and Best Adapted Screenplay, in addition to a Best Actress in a Supporting Role nomination for Kidman and Best Original Music and Best Cinematography nominations. The film received six nominations at Critics' Choice Awards, including Best Picture, Best Supporting Actor for Patel, Best Supporting Actress for Kidman, Best Adapted Screenplay, Best Score and Best Young Performer for Pawar. The film received four nominations at Golden Globe Awards, including Best Motion Picture – Drama, Best Supporting Actor – Motion Picture for Patel, Best Supporting Actress – Motion Picture for Kidman and Best Original Score. The film received five nominations at Satellite Awards, including Best Film, Best Supporting Actor for Patel, Best Supporting Actress for Kidman, Best Adapted Screenplay and Best Editing.

== Accolades ==
Award	Date of ceremony	Category	Recipient(s) and nominee(s)	Result	Ref.
AACTA Awards	6 December 2017	Best Film	Iain Canning, Angie Fielder and Emile Sherman	Won	
AACTA Awards	6 December 2017	Best Direction	Garth Davis	Won	
AACTA Awards	6 December 2017	Best Adapted Screenplay	Luke Davies	Won	
AACTA Awards	6 December 2017	Best Actor	Sunny Pawar	Won	
AACTA Awards	6 December 2017	Best Supporting Actor	Dev Patel	Won	
AACTA Awards	6 December 2017	Best Supporting Actress	Nicole Kidman	Won	
AACTA Awards	6 December 2017	Best Cinematography	Greig Fraser	Won	
AACTA Awards	6 December 2017	Best Editing	Alexandre de Franceschi	Won	
AACTA Awards	6 December 2017	Best Original Music Score	Volker Bertelmann, Dustin O’Halloran	Won	
AACTA Awards	6 December 2017	Best Sound	James Ashton, Nakul Kamte, Robert Mackenzie, Glenn Newnham, Andrew Ramage, Mario Vaccaro	Won	
AACTA Awards	6 December 2017	Best Production Design	Chris Kennedy	Won	
AACTA Awards	6 December 2017	Best Costume Design	Cappi Ireland	Won	
AACTA Awards	8 January 2017	Best International Film	Lion	Nominated	
AACTA Awards	8 January 2017	Best International Direction	Garth Davis	Nominated	
AACTA Awards	8 January 2017	Best International Supporting Actor	Dev Patel	Won	
AACTA Awards	8 January 2017	Best International Supporting Actress	Nicole Kidman	Won	
AACTA Awards	8 January 2017	Best International Screenplay	Luke Davies	Nominated	
AARP Movies for Grownups Awards	6 February 2017	Best Movie for Grownups	Lion	Nominated	
AARP Movies for Grownups Awards	6 February 2017	Best Supporting Actress	Nicole Kidman	Nominated	
AARP Movies for Grownups Awards	6 February 2017	Best Intergenerational Film	Lion	Nominated	
Academy Awards	26 February 2017	Best Picture	Iain Canning, Angie Fielder and Emile Sherman	Nominated	
Academy Awards	26 February 2017	Best Supporting Actor	Dev Patel	Nominated	
Academy Awards	26 February 2017	Best Supporting Actress	Nicole Kidman	Nominated	
Academy Awards	26 February 2017	Best Adapted Screenplay	Luke Davies	Nominated	
Academy Awards	26 February 2017	Best Cinematography	Greig Fraser	Nominated	
Academy Awards	26 February 2017	Best Original Score	Dustin O'Halloran and Hauschka	Nominated	
African-American Film Critics Association	8 February 2017	Top 10 Films	Lion	4th place	
Alliance of Women Film Journalists	21 December 2016	Best Screenplay, Adapted	Luke Davies	Nominated	
American Society of Cinematographers	4 February 2017	Outstanding Achievement in Cinematography in Theatrical Releases	Greig Fraser	Won	
Art Directors Guild Awards	11 February 2017	Excellence in Production Design for a Contemporary Film	Chris Kennedy	Nominated	
ASE Award		Best Editing in a Feature Film	Alexandre de Franceschi	Won	
Asia Pacific Screen Awards	24 November 2016	Best Actor in a Leading Role	Dev Patel	Nominated	
Asia Pacific Screen Awards	24 November 2016	Special Mention: Grand Jury Prize	Sunny Pawar	Won	
Austin Film Critics Association	28 December 2016	Best Adapted Screenplay	Luke Davies	Nominated	
Austin Film Festival	20 October 2016	Marquee Audience Award	Lion	Won	
British Academy Film Awards	12 February 2017	Best Actor in a Supporting Role	Dev Patel	Won	
British Academy Film Awards	12 February 2017	Best Actress in a Supporting Role	Nicole Kidman	Nominated	
British Academy Film Awards	12 February 2017	Best Cinematography	Greig Fraser	Nominated	
British Academy Film Awards	12 February 2017	Best Original Music	Dustin O'Halloran and Hauschka	Nominated	
British Academy Film Awards	12 February 2017	Best Adapted Screenplay	Luke Davies	Won	
Camerimage	19 November 2016	Golden Frog Award for Best Cinematography	Greig Fraser	Won	
Chicago International Film Festival	27 October 2016	Audience Award	Lion	Won (Note: Tied with Moonlight)	
Costume Designers Guild	21 February 2017	Excellence in Contemporary Film	Cappi Ireland	Nominated	
Critics' Choice Awards	11 December 2016	Best Picture	Lion	Nominated	
Critics' Choice Awards	11 December 2016	Best Supporting Actor	Dev Patel	Nominated	
Critics' Choice Awards	11 December 2016	Best Supporting Actress	Nicole Kidman	Nominated	
Critics' Choice Awards	11 December 2016	Best Adapted Screenplay	Luke Davies	Nominated	
Critics' Choice Awards	11 December 2016	Best Score	Dustin O'Halloran and Hauschka	Nominated	
Critics' Choice Awards	11 December 2016	Best Young Performer	Sunny Pawar	Nominated	
Denver Film Festival	13 November 2016	Audience Award for Best Narrative Feature	Lion	Won	
Directors Guild of America Awards	4 February 2017	Outstanding Directing – Feature Film	Garth Davis	Nominated	
Directors Guild of America Awards	4 February 2017	Outstanding Directing – First-Time Feature Film	Garth Davis	Won	
Evening Standard British Film Awards	8 December 2016	Best Actor	Dev Patel	Nominated	
Evening Standard British Film Awards	8 December 2016	International Film of the Year	Lion	Won	
Golden Globe Awards	8 January 2017	Best Motion Picture – Drama	Lion	Nominated	
Golden Globe Awards	8 January 2017	Best Supporting Actor – Motion Picture	Dev Patel	Nominated	
Golden Globe Awards	8 January 2017	Best Supporting Actress – Motion Picture	Nicole Kidman	Nominated	
Golden Globe Awards	8 January 2017	Best Original Score	Dustin O'Halloran and Hauschka	Nominated	
Heartland Film Festival	30 October 2016	Truly Moving Picture Award	Garth Davis	Won	
Hollywood Film Awards	6 November 2016	Hollywood Supporting Actress Award	Nicole Kidman	Won	
Hollywood Music in Media Awards	17 November 2016	Best Original Score – Feature Film	Dustin O'Halloran and Hauschka	Nominated	
Houston Film Critics Society	6 January 2017	Best Picture	Lion	Nominated	
Houston Film Critics Society	6 January 2017	Best Supporting Actor	Dev Patel	Nominated	
Location Managers Guild Awards	8 April 2017	Outstanding Locations in Contemporary Film	Hugo Cran, Harsh Dave and Sandeep Rudra	Nominated	
Mill Valley Film Festival	16 October 2016	Overall Audience Favorite	Lion	Won	
NAACP Image Awards	11 February 2017	Outstanding Independent Picture	Lion	Nominated	
NAACP Image Awards	11 February 2017	Outstanding Directing in a Motion Picture	Garth Davis	Nominated	
Palm Springs International Film Festival	2 January 2017	International Star Award	Nicole Kidman	Won	
Producers Guild of America Awards	28 January 2017	Best Theatrical Motion Picture	Iain Canning, Angie Fielder and Emile Sherman	Nominated	
San Diego Film Critics Society	12 December 2016	Best Supporting Actress	Nicole Kidman	Nominated	
San Diego Film Critics Society	12 December 2016	Best Adapted Screenplay	Luke Davies	Nominated	
Santa Barbara International Film Festival	3 February 2017	Virtuosos Award	Dev Patel	Won	
Satellite Awards	19 February 2017	Best Film	Lion	Nominated	
Satellite Awards	19 February 2017	Best Supporting Actor	Dev Patel	Nominated	
Satellite Awards	19 February 2017	Best Supporting Actress	Nicole Kidman	Nominated	
Satellite Awards	19 February 2017	Best Adapted Screenplay	Luke Davies	Nominated	
Satellite Awards	19 February 2017	Best Editing	Alexandre de Franceschi	Nominated	
Saturn Awards	28 June 2017	Best Independent Film	Lion	Nominated	
Screen Actors Guild Awards	29 January 2017	Outstanding Performance by a Male Actor in a Supporting Role	Dev Patel	Nominated	
Screen Actors Guild Awards	29 January 2017	Outstanding Performance by a Female Actor in a Supporting Role	Nicole Kidman	Nominated	
St. Louis Film Critics Association	18 December 2016	Best Supporting Actor	Dev Patel	Nominated	
St. Louis Film Critics Association	18 December 2016	Best Adapted Screenplay	Luke Davies	Nominated	
Toronto International Film Festival	18 September 2016	People's Choice Award	Lion	1st Runner-up	
USC Scripter Awards	11 February 2017	Best Screenplay	Luke Davies	Nominated	
Virginia Film Festival	6 November 2016	Audience Award for Best Narrative Feature	Lion	Won	
Washington D.C. Area Film Critics Association	5 December 2016	Best Youth Performance	Sunny Pawar	Nominated	
Washington D.C. Area Film Critics Association	5 December 2016	Best Adapted Screenplay	Luke Davies	Nominated	
Young Artist Award	17 March 2017	Best Performance in a Feature Film – Leading Young Actor	Sunny Pawar	Nominated	
