= Grote Street =

Street in Adelaide, South Australia

Grote Street South Australia
- Grote Street near the Adelaide Central Market
- Coordinates: 34.929246°S 138.587860°E (West end); 34.928665°S 138.599211°E (East end)

General information
- Type: Street
- Location: Adelaide city centre
- Length: 1.0 km (0.6 mi)
- Opened: 1837

Major junctions
- West end: Sir Donald Bradman Drive; Adelaide
- West Terrace; Morphett Street
- East end: Victoria Square; Adelaide

Location(s)
- LGA(s): City of Adelaide

Grote Street is a major street running east to west in the western half of Adelaide city centre, South Australia. It is on the northern border of Chinatown and the Adelaide Central Market, and is a lively centre for shopping and restaurants. The historic Her Majesty's Theatre is located here.

== History ==
The street, laid out as part of Colonel Light's city plan in 1837, was named after George Grote, an English classical historian and supporter of Robert Gouger.

=== Churches ===
The original St Patrick's Church, Adelaide's first Catholic church, was built from around 1845 on what is now Gray Street. It was the principal place of worship for Catholics until St Francis Xavier's Cathedral opened on Wakefield Street in 1858. A much larger building, designed by Woods Bagot, was built between 1912 and 1914, and still stands today, on the corner of Gary Street. The original church building was demolished in 1959.

A chapel was built on the northern side of Grote Street at the eastern end for the Church of Christ congregation in December 1856. This was replaced by a larger bluestone chapel in 1925. The old church was demolished in 1940 and the new one has been used for other than religious purposes for some time, including as a restaurant and entertainment venue.

=== Schools and colleges ===
The Grote Street Model School, on the corner with Morphett Street, was designed by architect Edward John Woods in 1872, and built by T. Martin & Son in 1873–74. This was the first of four "model schools" in the city centre. These included Sturt Street Public School (1883), Flinders Street Model School (1878), and Currie Street Model School (1893).

On the site, additional educational facilities were built. In June 1876, a teachers' training college opened, also designed by Woods. In 1891, the Advanced School for Girls opened, which was the first state secondary school in the colony of South Australia, as well as the first state school for girls above primary level. It was designed by Owen Smyth in 1890, and built by J. J. Leahy.

In 1908 the Model School and the Training School were amalgamated, forming the Continuation School for Boys, which then amalgamated with the Advanced School for Girls, creating Adelaide High School in September 1908. The buildings were then used by the Department of Further Education and the Multicultural Education Centre, later being sold for various private uses.

In 1978, the Centre for the Performing Arts was established on the site of the old Adelaide Girls High School.

Nos. 109-119 Grote Street, the buildings comprising the schools, were state-heritage-listed in 1981.

=== Trades Hall ===
The United Trades and Labor Council (UTLC), established in 1884, constructed a Trades Hall on the northern side of the street, near Victoria Square. Although not financially supported by the colonial government, it was funded by various private donations by parliamentarians, including Richard Chaffey Baker, George Charles Hawker, and John Howard Angas. The building was officially opened on 4 March 1896. In the early 1900s Robert Barr Smith donated £2,300 to pay off the outstanding mortgage.

=== Businesses ===
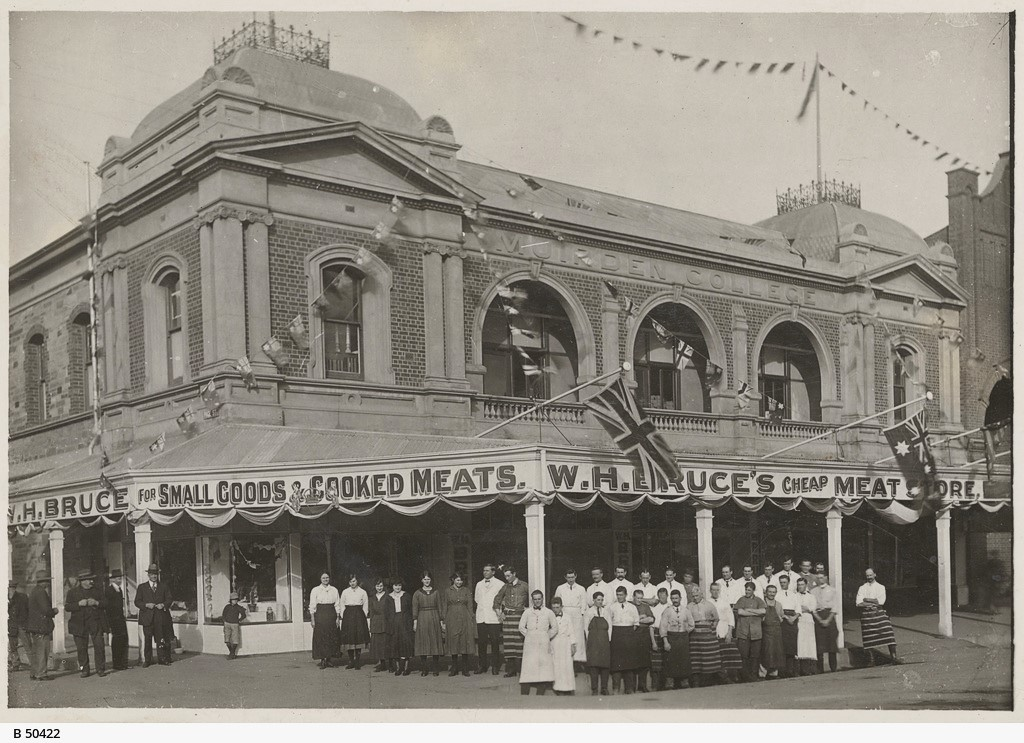
W. H Bruce smallgoods and meat store, c. 1921

Around 1903, W. H. Bruce started a business with £30 capital "in a little shop of 12 ft^{2} (1.1 m^{2}) in the Central Market", trading in "fancy goods", soon moving on to tailoring, which by 1918 was "the largest tailoring concern in Australasia". He leased a group of two-storey shops with a 220-foot (67 m) frontage, built in 1906, for about 20 years. Part of these later became the Empire Theatre. In 1909, Bruce converted the upper storey of two of his shops into an amusement hall used for screening films by means of a photo-rotoscope, called Golden Gate Hall.

Toys were sold in this hall, with films shown periodically, every afternoon and evening, for free. This lasted for a year before being converted back into a large storage room. Apart from his large retail stores, Bruce ran what were known as "cheapjack" stalls at the market, basically a type of lottery or "sixpenny dip", where buyers would offer a coin for an unknown purchase.

Bruce had a successful career as a businessman though the 1910s, establishing a number of stores in Adelaide and country towns, as well as breeding pigs. In 1918, Bruce amalgamated his considerable business interests in New South Wales with those in South Australia, forming the company W. H. Bruce Limited, which had a capital value of £150,000, with £47,000 being in fully paid-up shares. Bruce allocated 5,000 shares to current employees of the business, and 1,000 to past employees.

He was the governing director of the new company. At this time he had shops in Kadina and Port Pirie in South Australia, three locations in Victoria, and six in New South Wales. He had a 14,000-acre (5,700 ha) farm near Renmark, South Australia, and was described in The Advertiser as one "who has long been recognised as one of Adelaide's leading business magnates".

In October 1925 a fire broke out in his Grote Street store and damaged most of his stock of suits. In 1929, having taken over Conrad's butcher in Hindley Street (possibly upon Conrad's death in 1918), Bruce had butcher shops in Grote Street, Rundle Street, Port Adelaide, and Glenelg. He was later described as a "great businessman". There was still a business concern named W. H. Bruce in 1954, which opened a new food store (of meats) at 13–15 Grote Street in December 1954.

In 1931, an arcade was constructed through the shops formerly leased by Bruce, to create a northern entrance to the Adelaide Central Market.

=== Theatres and cinemas ===
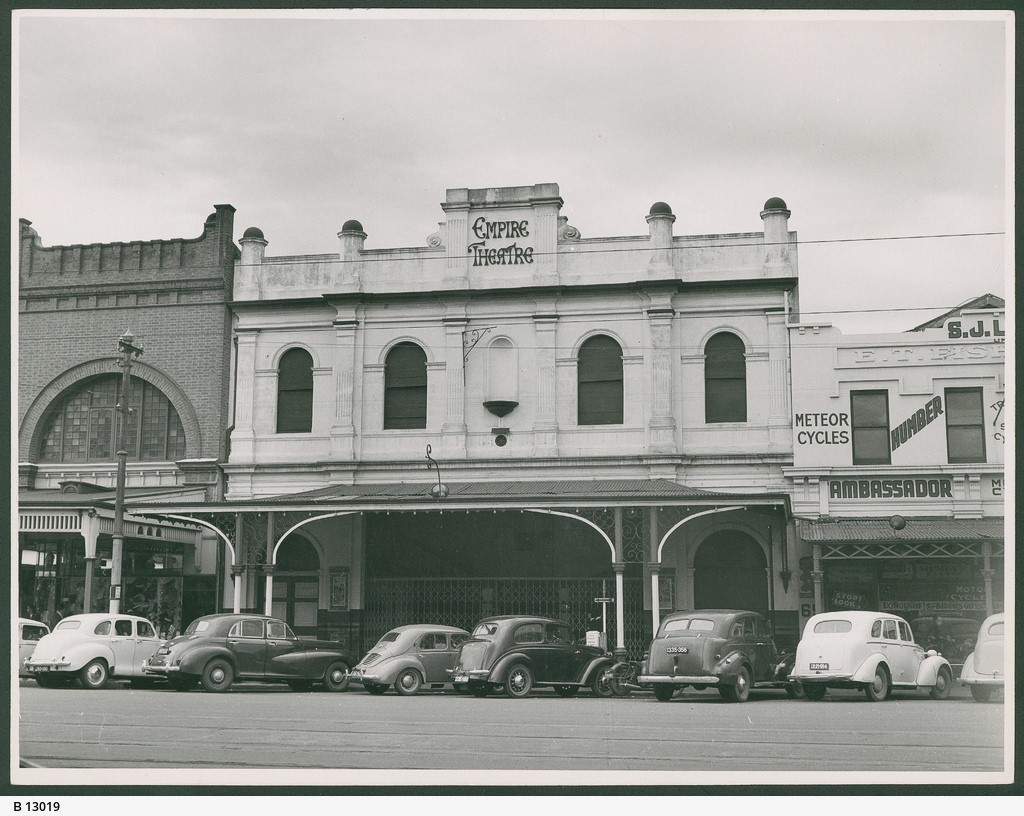
The Empire Theatre, c.1952

Empire

On 10 April 1909 the first theatre in Grote Street, the Empire Theatre, opened. Designed by A. Barnham Black, the theatre, in January 1910 run by Messrs Lennon, Hyman, and Lennon, initially featured vaudeville acts and movies, then silent films. It continued as a picture theatre until 1952. It was converted into a Peoplestores store in 1953–4. It still stands today (2022), numbered 61–68 and housing several stores.

Lyric

The Lyric Theatre was a cinema built by owner W. H. Bruce, completed during a builders' labourers' strike in 1912 by paying the men the wages asked for by their union. It opened on 21 December with a programme including The Price of a Man and Kathleen Mavourneen. There was gallery seating at the back where seats could be reserved, gallery seating down the sides and stalls seating in the middle. The entrance was described as being "under Muirden College".

The films were billed as being put on by W. H. Bruce's Pictures in 1912. The cinema was still screening films on 17 January 2014, but soon thereafter advertisements appear for the auction of a variety of goods at the entrance to the Lyric Theatre, including jewellery, suit materials, and Japanese goods.

Princess/New Tivoli/Her Majesty's

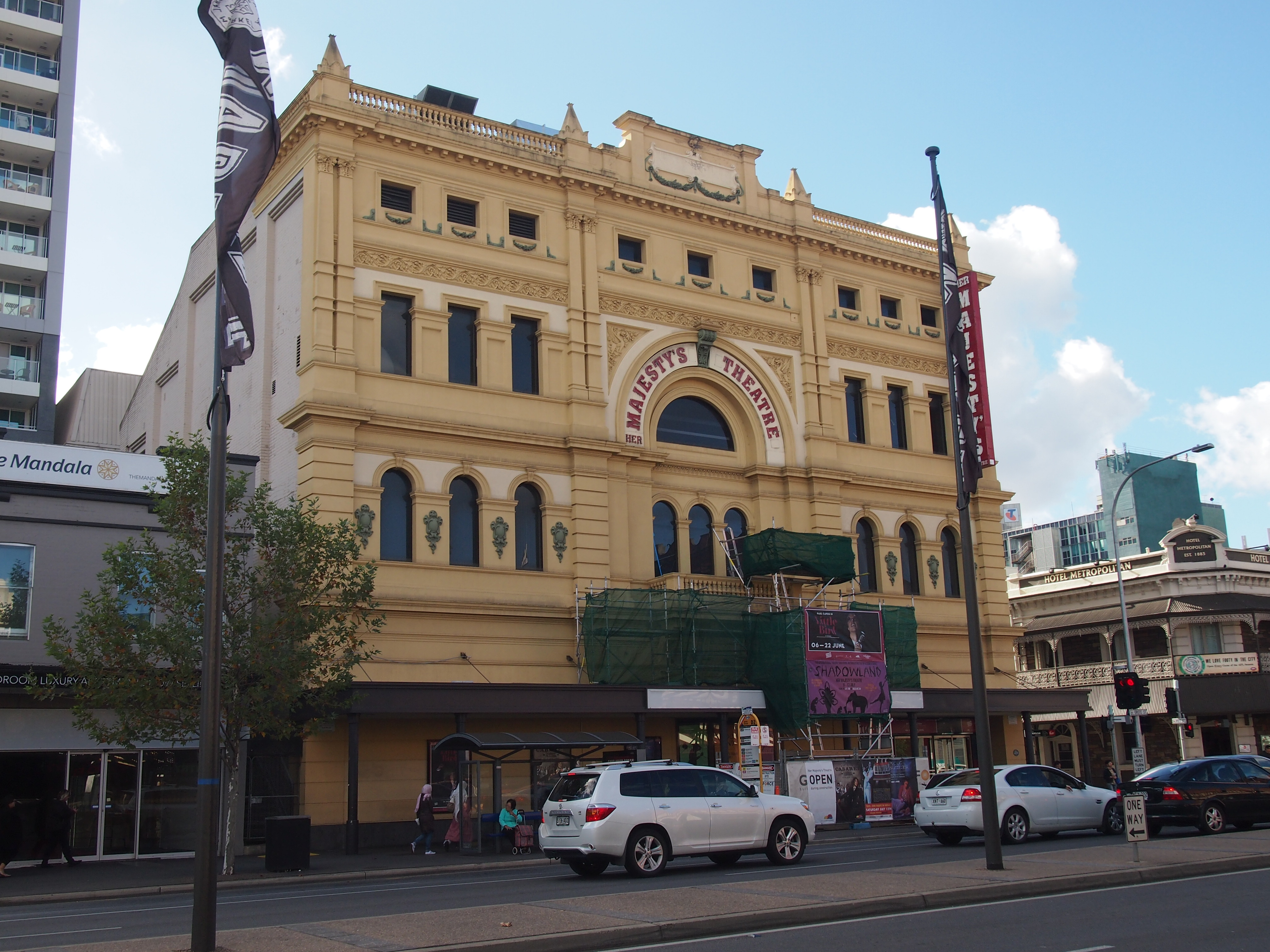
Her Majesty's Theatre, Grote Street

The Princess Theatre, built in 1912–13 for Edwin Daw, was immediately leased and renamed as the New Tivoli Theatre, and staged vaudeville acts, stage plays, and other entertainment. After the Theatre Royal in Hindley Street was closed in 1962, the Tivoli was extensively refurbished and reopened as Her Majesty's Theatre, which still stands today.

Promethean

The old Liquor Trades Union Hall at 116 Grote Street was converted into the Promethean Theatre in the early 1980s, which featured productions by small theatre companies and drama students, as well as Adelaide Festival and Fringe Festival events. The theatre closed in 2007, but the Promethean continued to operate as a music venue.

== Description ==
Grote Street is in Adelaide city centre. It runs in an east–west direction, as a continuation of Wakefield Street where it crosses Victoria Square. It concludes at West Terrace. The road which continues is Sir Donald Bradman Drive. The Grote Street–Sir Donald Bradman Drive route is the most direct method of travelling from the CBD to the Adelaide Airport.

Today Grote Street is largely occupied by retail outlets and restaurants.

Moonta Street Chinatown is accessible via Grote Street, which is also home to some Chinese restaurants and other businesses owned by Chinese Australians and Korean Australians.

The northern entrance of the Adelaide Central Markets is on Grote Street. A paifang, comprising an archway erected by the city council and two lions donated by the People's Republic of China, marks the northern entrance to the Chinatown.

St Patrick's Church, Her Majesty's Theatre, and the rear entrance of the Adelaide Central bus station are located on this street.

Since the 21st century, Grote Street has become the home of various businesses selling items relating to housing construction and renovation, such as tiles, built-in furniture, and bedding. There are also apartment blocks providing accommodation for university students.
