= Gouger Street, Adelaide =

Street in Adelaide, South Australia

Gouger Street South Australia
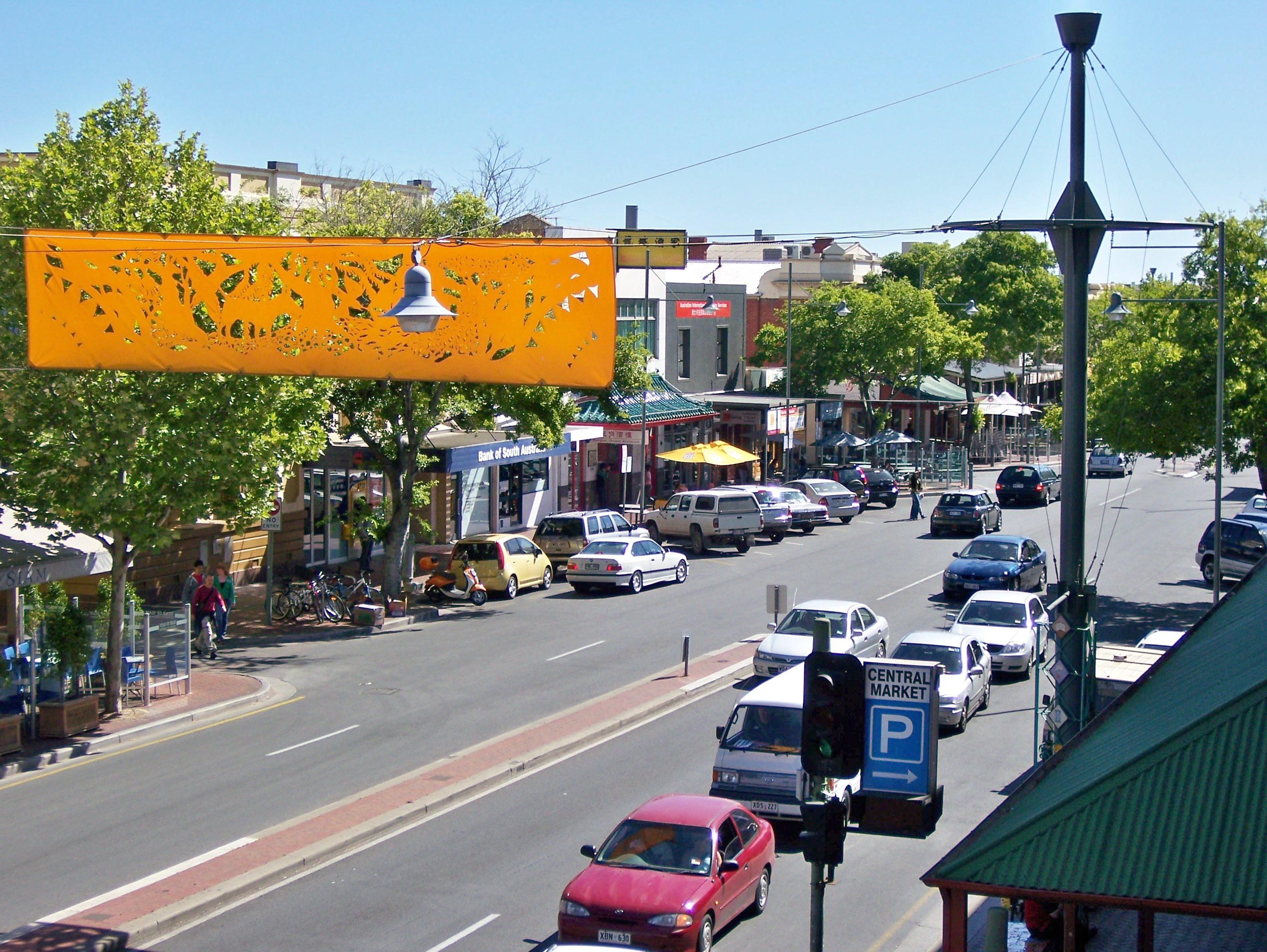
- Gouger Street, looking westward from the Adelaide Central Market
- Coordinates: 34.930707°S 138.587942°E (West end); 34.930117°S 138.600059°E (East end)

General information
- Type: Street
- Location: Adelaide city centre
- Length: 1.1 km (0.7 mi)
- Opened: 1837

Major junctions
- West end: West Terrace; Adelaide
- Morphett Street; Victoria Square
- East end: King William Street; Adelaide

Location(s)
- LGA(s): City of Adelaide

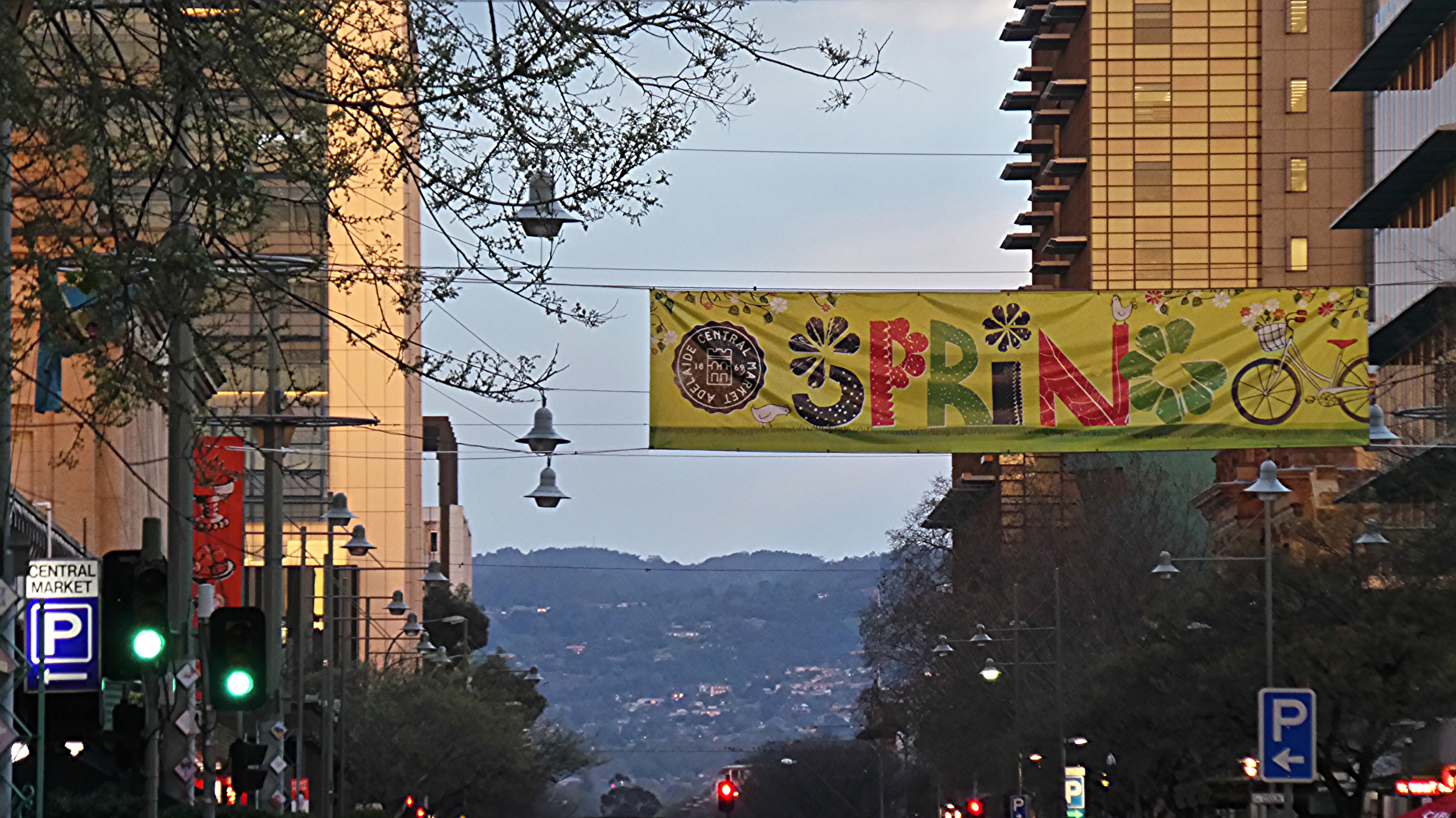
Street sign in Gouger Street. The Adelaide Hills are visible in the distance.

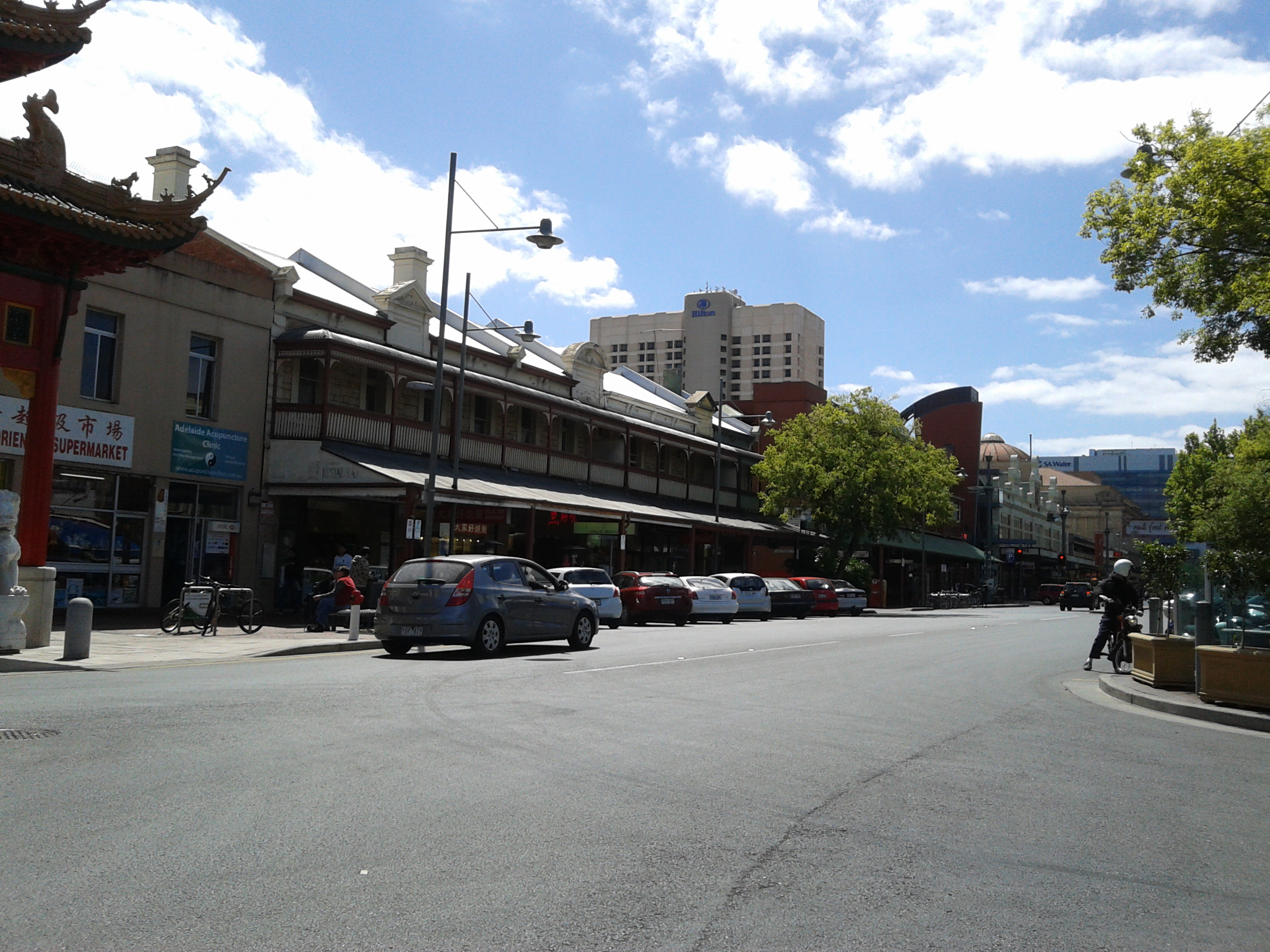
Gouger Street near Chinatown

Gouger Street (/ˈɡʊdʒər/ GUUJ-ər) is a major street in the centre of Adelaide, South Australia. It was named after Robert Gouger, the first Colonial Secretary of South Australia.

== Restaurant district ==
Gouger Street is known for its high-end international restaurants and cafes. Cuisines found along Gouger Street include Italian, French, Argentinian, Malaysian, Vietnamese, Chinese and Thai. Many of the restaurants on Gouger Street have won awards. Some of the better known ones are Star of Siam (which specializes in Thai cuisine), La Porchetta (Italian) and Chi on Gouger.

The southern entrance of the Adelaide Central Market is on Gouger street. A paifang, comprising an archway erected by the city council and two lions donated by the People's Republic of China, marks the southern entrance to the Moonta Street Chinatown.

== Junction list ==
Location	km	mi	Destinations	Notes
Adelaide city centre	0	0.0	West Terrace	Western terminus of Gouger Street.
Adelaide city centre	0.06	0.037	Monck Lane north	No through road.
Adelaide city centre	0.14	0.087	Murrays Lane south	No through road.
Adelaide city centre	0.19	0.12	Bailey Street south	
Adelaide city centre	0.26	0.16	Blenheim Street north Lowe Street south	One-way street – entry only.
Adelaide city centre	0.33	0.21	Claxton Street south Marlborough Street north	
Adelaide city centre	0.39	0.24	Byron Place north	
Adelaide city centre	0.45	0.28	Oakley Street north Selby Street south	
Adelaide city centre	0.49	0.30	Storr Street north	
Adelaide city centre	0.52	0.32	Bartels Street south	One-way street – entry only.
Adelaide city centre	0.57	0.35	Morphett Street north/south	
Adelaide city centre	0.62	0.39	Witcombe Street north	
Adelaide city centre	0.75	0.47	Moonta Street north Field Street south	Moonta Street to the north is a pedestrian way. Field Street is a one-way street – entry only.
Adelaide city centre	0.80	0.50	California Street South north	No through road.
Adelaide city centre	0.81	0.50	Compton Street south	One-way street – exit only.
Adelaide city centre	0.87	0.54	Market Street south	One-way street – entry only.
Adelaide city centre	0.94	0.58	Coglin Street south	One-way street – exit only.
Adelaide city centre	1.00	0.62	Mill Street south	
Adelaide city centre	1.11	0.69	Victoria Square north King William Street south	Eastern terminus of Gouger Street. Continues as Angas Street east.
1.000 mi = 1.609 km; 1.000 km = 0.621 mi: Route transition
