= List of awards and nominations received by Dev (singer) =

Dev awards and nominations
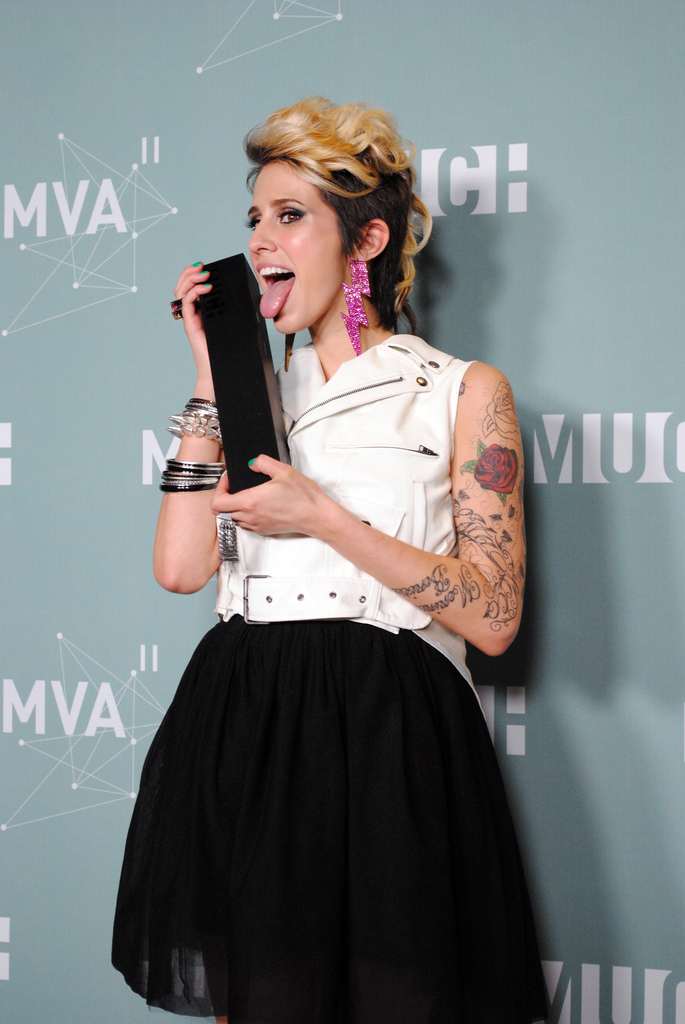
Awards and nominations
Award	Wins	Nominations
Billboard	0	2
Brit	0	1
Much	1	3

Totals (Note: Certain award groups do not simply award one winner. They acknowledge several different recipients, have runners-up, and have third place. Since this is a specific recognition and is different from losing an award, runner-up mentions are considered wins in this award tally. For simplification and to avoid errors, each award in this list has been presumed to have had a prior nomination.)
- Wins: 3
- Nominations: 16

This is a list of awards and nominations received by Dev during her career. She has won 3 awards from 16 nominations.

== Awards received by Dev ==
Year	Nominated work	Award	Result
2012	Dev	MTV Artists to Watch in 2012	Won

Year	Nominated work	Award	Result
2012	Dev	Top 99 women to watch in 2012	Runner-up

Year	Nominated work	Award	Result
2014	Dev	Latina 30 Under 30	Runner-up

=== 4 Music Awards ===
Year	Nominated work	Award	Result
2011	"Bass Down Low" (featuring The Cataracs)	Best Big Beats of 2011	Nominated

=== Billboard Music Awards ===
Year	Nominated work	Award	Result
2011	"Like A G6" (with Far East Movement & The Cataracs)	Top Rap Song	Nominated
2012	"In The Dark"	Top Dance Song	Nominated

=== BMI Pop Music Awards ===
Year	Nominated work	Award	Result
2013	"In the Dark"	Best Song	Won

=== Brit Awards ===
Year	Nominated work	Award	Result
2012	"She Makes Me Wanna" (with JLS)	British Single	Nominated

=== International Dance Music Awards ===
Year	Nominee / work	Award	Result
2011	"Like a G6"	Best Rap/Hip-Hop Dance Track	Won

=== MP3 Music Awards ===
Year	Nominated work	Award	Result
2012	"She Makes Me Wanna" (with JLS)	MIC music Industry Choice	Nominated

=== mtvU Woodie Awards ===
Year	Nominated work	Award	Result
2011	Dev	Breakthrough Woodie	Nominated

=== MTV Video Music Awards Japan ===
Year	Nominated work	Award	Result
2011	"Like a G6"	Best Hip-Hop Video	Nominated

=== MuchMusic Video Awards ===
Year	Nominated work	Award	Result
2011	"Like a G6" (with Far East Movement & The Cataracs)	International Video of the year (Group)	Won
2012	"In the Dark"	Most Streamed Video of the Year	Nominated
2014	"Danse" (with Mia Martina)	Pop Video Of The Year	Nominated

=== Rockbjörnen Awards ===
Year	Nominated work	Award	Result
2012	"Hotter Than Fire" (with Eric Saade)	Best Swedish Song	Nominated
