= Adelaide Central Market =

Produce market in Adelaide, South Australia

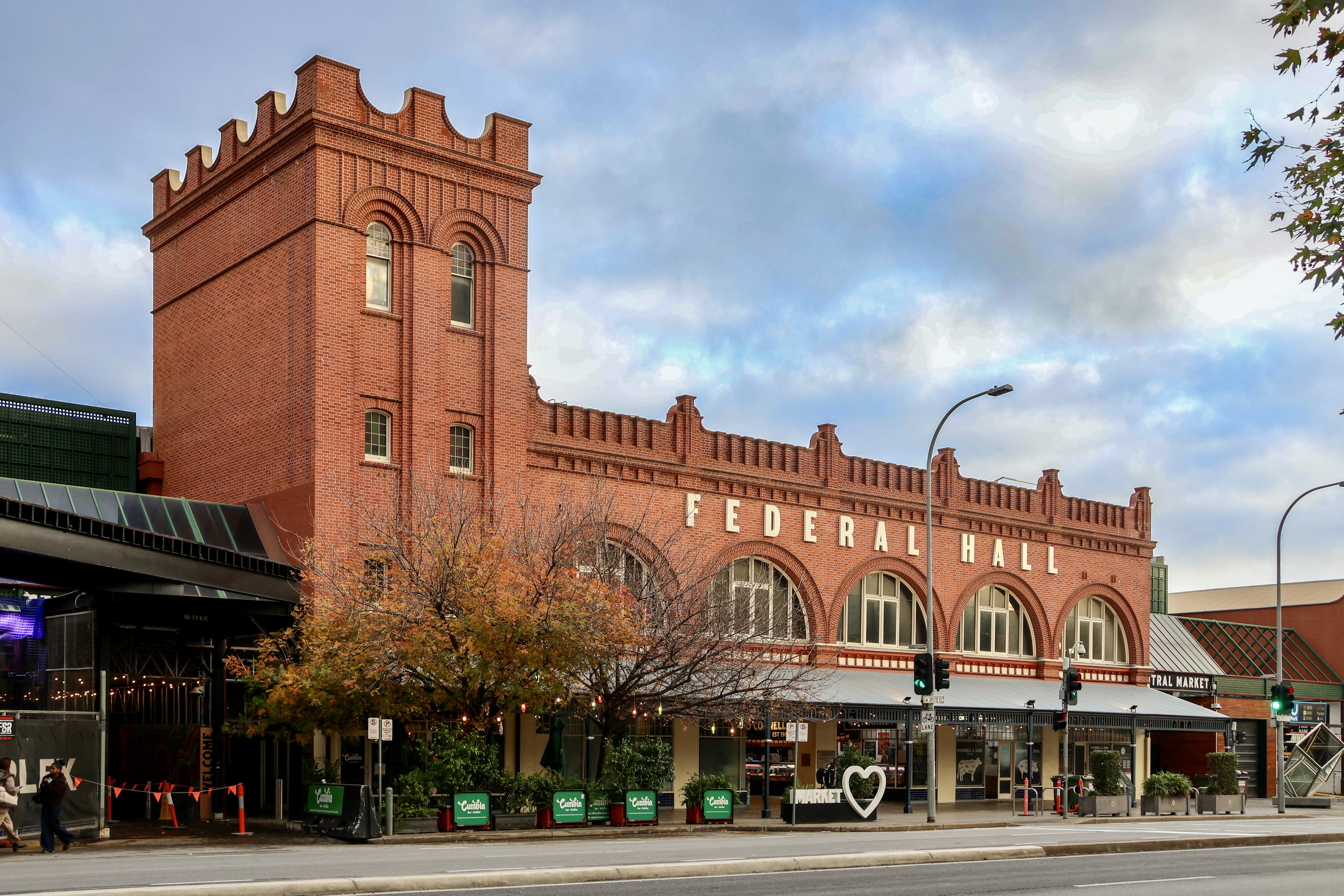
- The restored facade of the Adelaide Central Market
- Location: Adelaide, Australia
- Coordinates: 34°55′47″S 138°35′51″E
- Website: adelaidecentralmarket.com.au

The Adelaide Central Market is a major fresh produce market in Adelaide, South Australia. As one of the oldest markets in Australia, Adelaide Central Market has a large range of fresh food, including fruit and vegetables, meat and poultry, seafood, cheeses, baked goods, small goods, and health foods, along with several cafés and eateries. Currently, approximately one million kilograms of fresh produce are delivered to the market and sold every month. It is a popular tourist attraction in the city, with more than 8.5 million visitors every year. It is also referred to simply as the Central Market. A $400 million redevelopment of the adjacent Central Market Arcade was approved in January 2021, which will include a mixed-use 35-storey building comprising offices, residential apartments and a hotel.

== History ==
=== 19th century ===
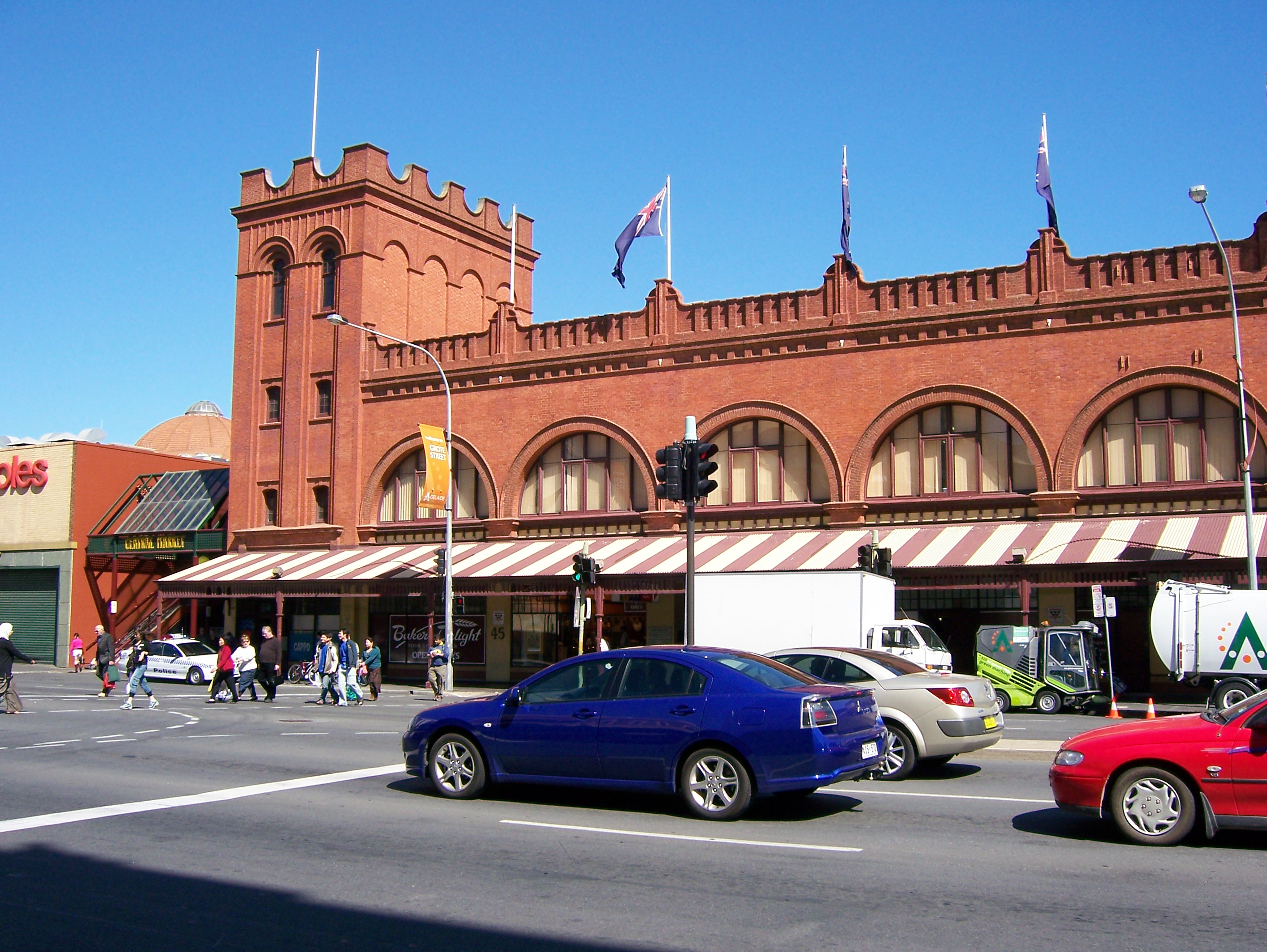
Adelaide Central Market from Grote Street

In January 1869 some traders moved from the East End Markets, between Rundle Street and North Terrace, to a new market site known as the City Market. They traded on open land for some time. Two large sheds were built in Grote Street that year, completed by June.

The City Market was officially opened by Mayor Judah Solomon on 23 January 1870. Later that year, three acres of land were bought for £2,600 in the present-day location.

At its commencement, it opened on Tuesdays and Saturdays with 50–100 produce carts selling vegetables, fruit, hay, fish, and game. Shops were built along the perimeter of the market and facing the streets. In the early 1880s, fish supplies were scarce in Adelaide and had to be brought from Port Augusta and Port Pirie by rail.

=== 20th century ===
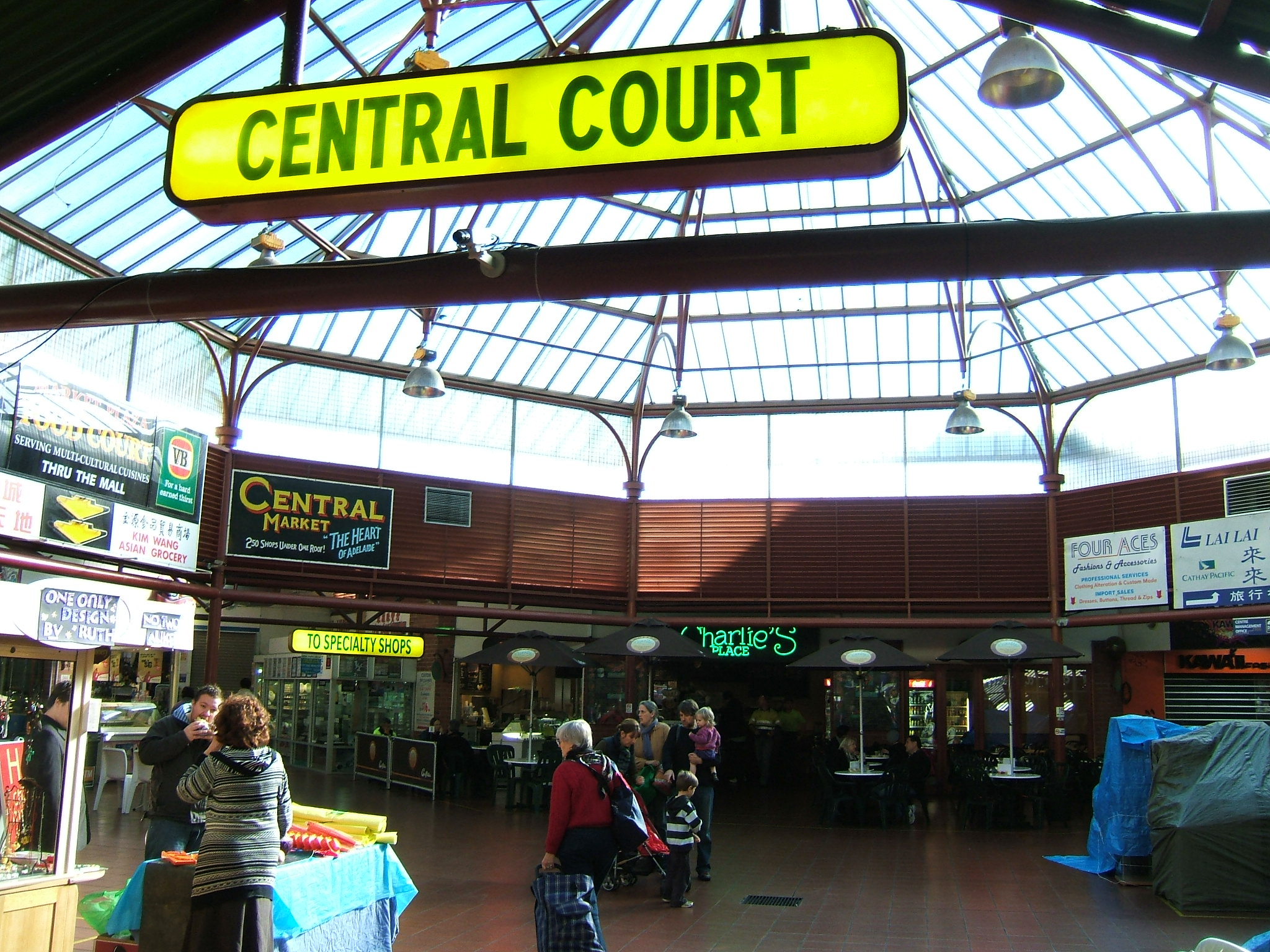
The Central Court

On 8 February 1900, a foundation stone was laid by Mayoress Rosa Ware, in the presence of the Mayor of Adelaide, Arthur Ware. Shops were added as well as a refrigeration plant for fruit and fish. Electricity was added in 1902 to replace the gas lighting. Arcade shops were added in 1915 on the eastern side. At that stage, amusements were provided such as darts, billatelle (a variation of billiards), shooting galleries, ball bowling, hoop-la and cheap jacks. The addition of other businesses, such as the Hampshire Hotel in 1911, the Moore's Department stores in 1914, and Her Majesty's Theatre also attracted customers. The Market opened for trading on Tuesday, commencing April 1920.

In December 1922, the fish quarters of the Market were demolished and further arcades of 32 shops were added.

On 27 December 1925, the northeastern quarters of the Market were partly damaged by a fire. In 1929, butchers' licenses for the Market were not renewed because of sanitary concerns.

Prior to August 1965, the Market was known as the "City Market," and after that, it was known as the "Central Market". Redevelopment of the market commenced on 18 January 1965 with the demolition of the east end facade on Grote Street and the addition of a car park. The new market was opened on 17 June 1966 by Lord Mayor James Irwin.

Coles Supermarkets joined the neighbouring Central Market Arcade in the Central Market precinct in June 1967. Further covered car parking was developed as well as the addition of a shopping complex.

On 27 June 1977, the market's southern stall area was badly damaged in a fire. Major restoration was undertaken to repair the damage caused by the fire. The restoration was completed in 1983.

=== 21st century ===
As of the 2000s, Central Market is surrounded by the Central Market Arcade, Adelaide China Town, and Market Plaza. The centre of the Central Market is made up primarily of fresh produce stalls, with the perimeter and arcade shops being mainly cafés, restaurants, and variety stores.

In 2015, the huge Father Christmas statue the previously adorned John Martin's and David Jones in Rundle Mall was mounted on the Grote St exterior wall of the market.

The Coles Supermarket was closed in 2022 and demolition commenced. Construction of a hotel, the Treehouse Hotel, will take place in 2023, as part of a $400 million Market Square development. The will include a commercial component (2025), retail development (2026), and housing (2025–2026). Treehouse Hotel is a brand owned by SH Hotels & Resorts, with Treehouse Hotel London being the first to open in November 2019. The Adelaide one will be the first in Australia, but it is also expanding to Manchester, California, and Florida.

== Central Market Precinct ==
Including the main Central Market building, the Central Market Precinct is composed of five separately managed areas.

=== Adelaide Central Market ===
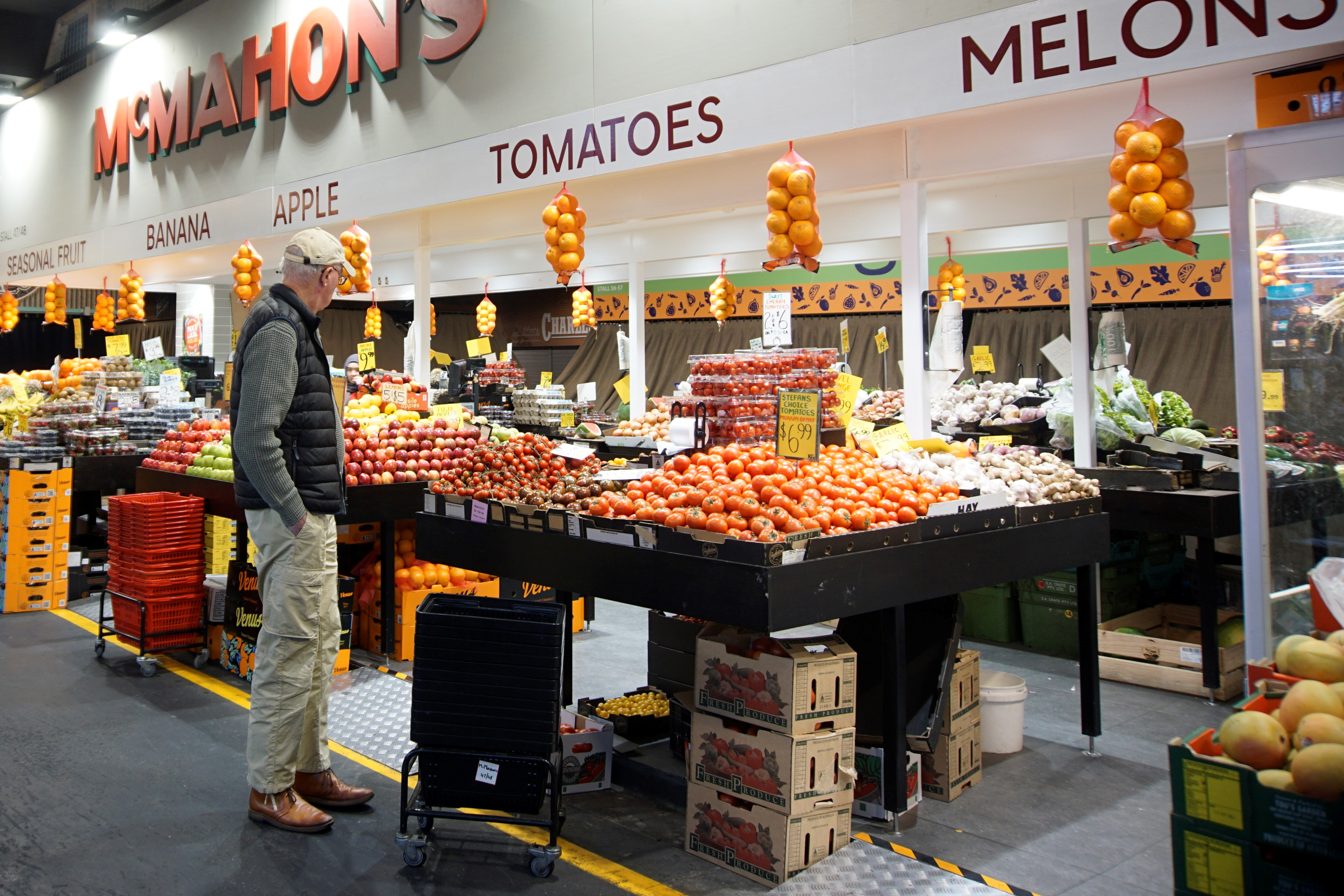
Stall at Central Market, Adelaide

The market itself holds over 76 stalls in a single undercover area. The Market is owned by the City of Adelaide and is managed by the Adelaide Central Market Authority (a subsidiary and statutory authority of the City of Adelaide), which also manages the car park above the entire precinct.

=== Central Market Arcade ===
Originally known as Victoria Square Arcade, the Central Market Arcade is located to the immediate east of the Central Market. The current arcade was constructed following the redevelopment of the market proper and was opened by then Premier David Tonkin on 3 November 1982; it houses over 60 specialty shops. Privately owned from its construction, the City of Adelaide assumed ownership of the arcade in September 2018 when the building's ground lease expired and began plans to completely redevelop the site into a new arcade topped with a mixed-use tower.

=== The Market Plaza ===
Located on the western side of the Central Market and linking it with Chinatown, the Market Plaza houses a number of specialty shops, cafes, and a food court. The Market Plaza was opened by Lord Mayor James Jarvis on 3 December 1985 and is independently owned and managed.

=== Gouger Street ===
Gouger Street in the Adelaide central business district is well known for its abundance of multicultural cuisine and dining establishments.

== Plaques and commemorative stones ==
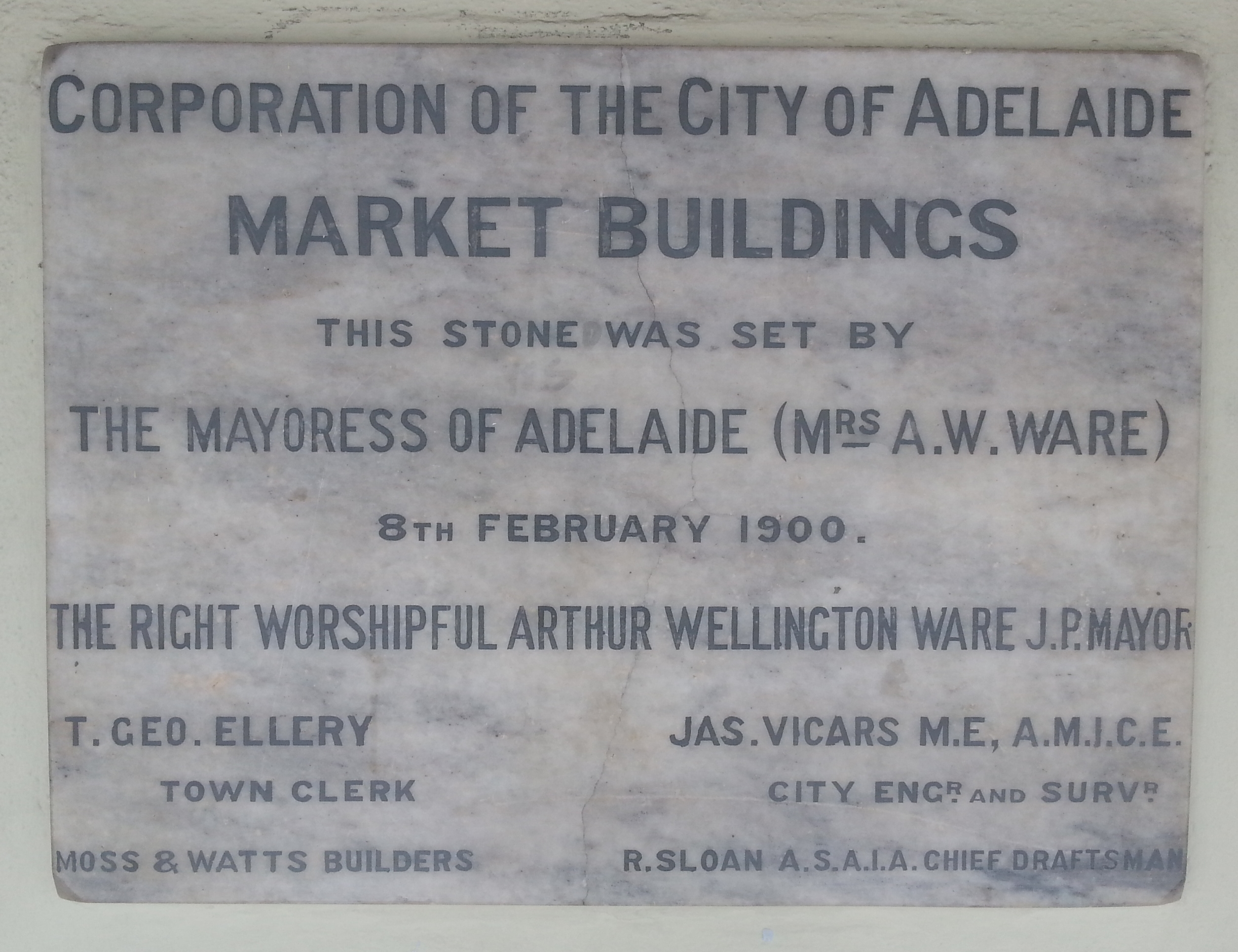
Foundation stone for the Adelaide Central Market Buildings set by Mayoress Rosa Ware and Mayor Arthur Ware on 8 February 1900. Currently located at the Grote Street entrance.

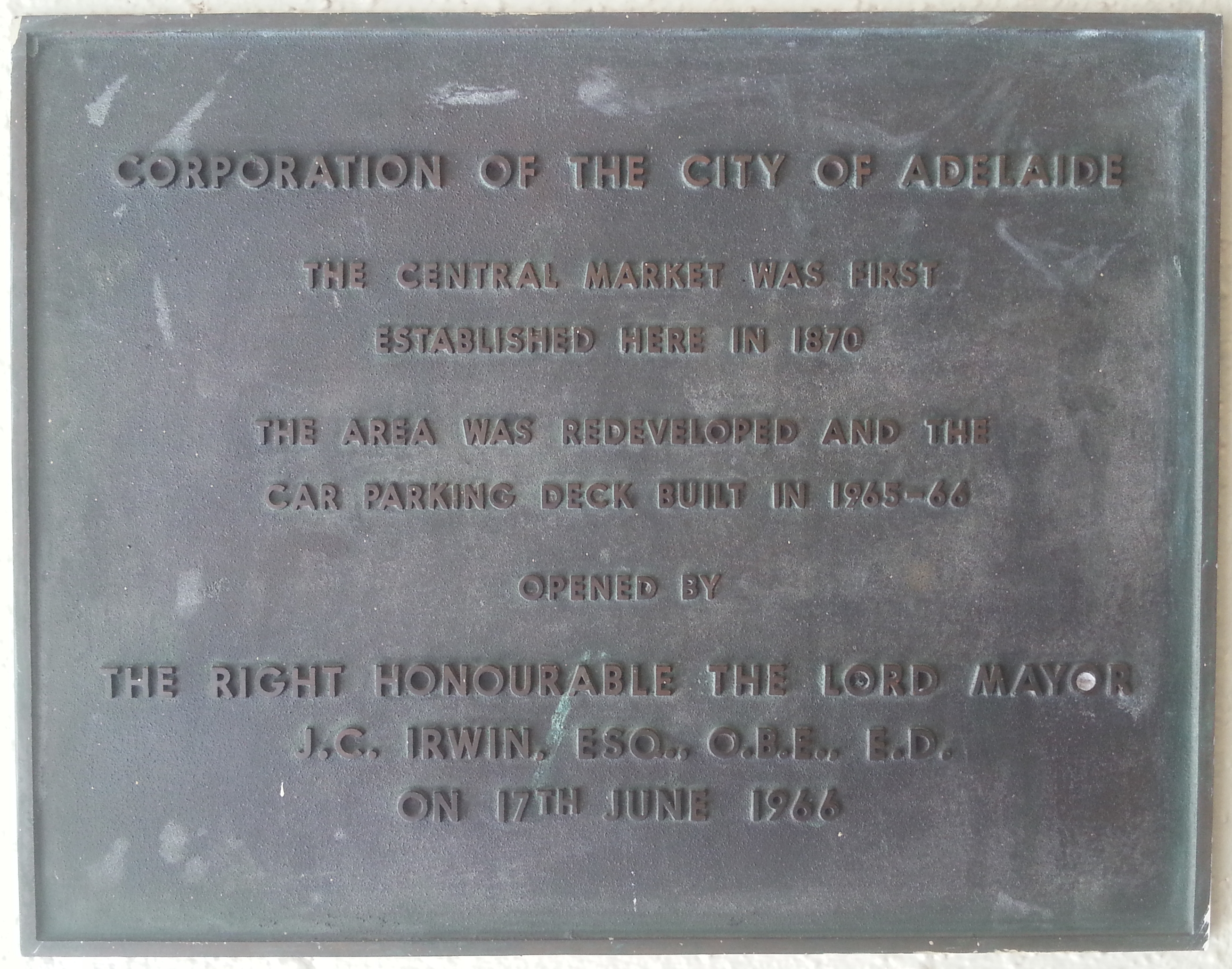
Plaque marking the opening of the redeveloped Adelaide Central Market Buildings by Lord Mayor James Irwin on 17 June 1966. Currently located at the Grote Street entrance.

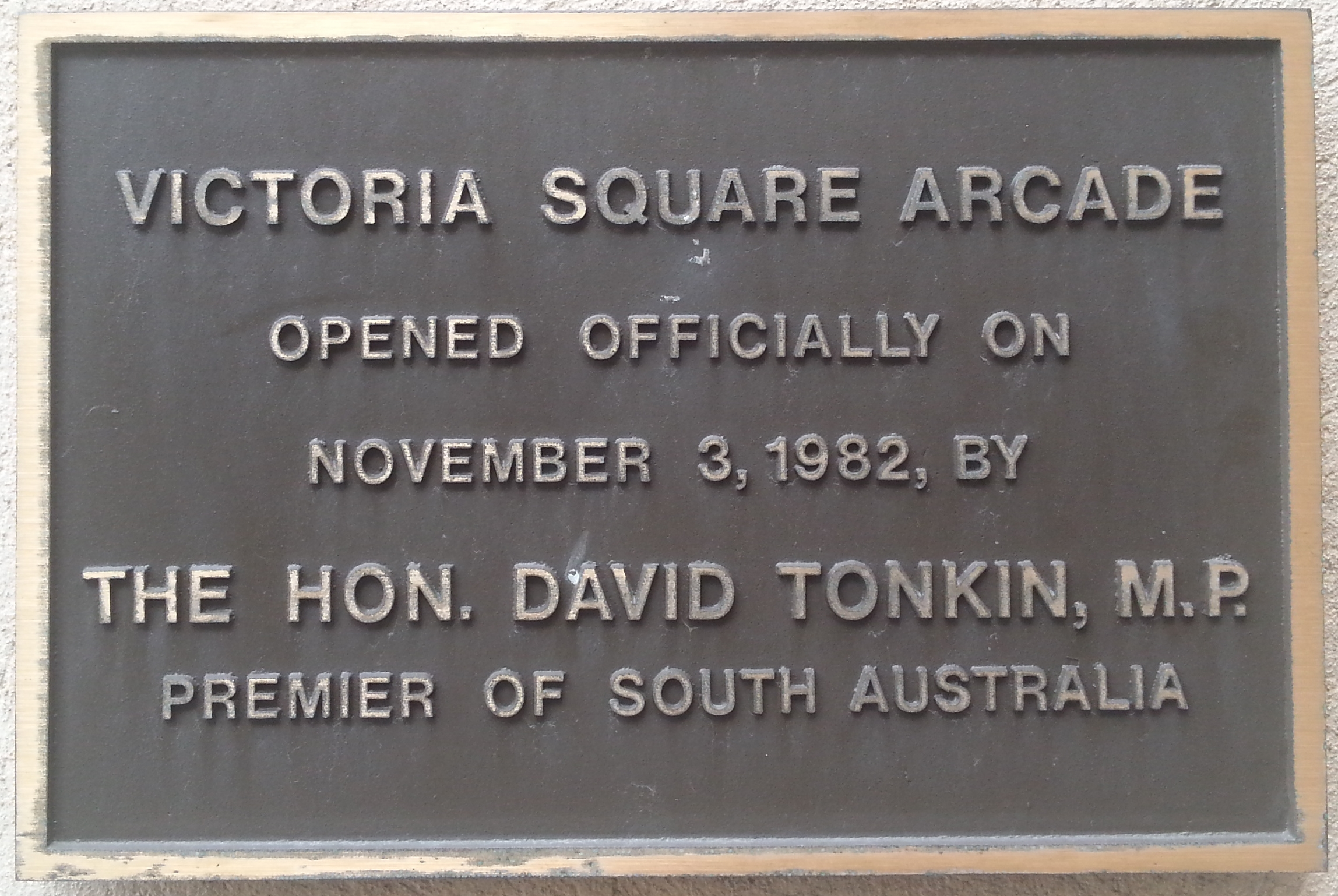
Plaque marking the opening of the Victoria Square Arcade (now Central Market Arcade) by Premier David Tonkin on 3 November 1982. Currently located at the Victoria Square entrance to the Central Market Arcade.

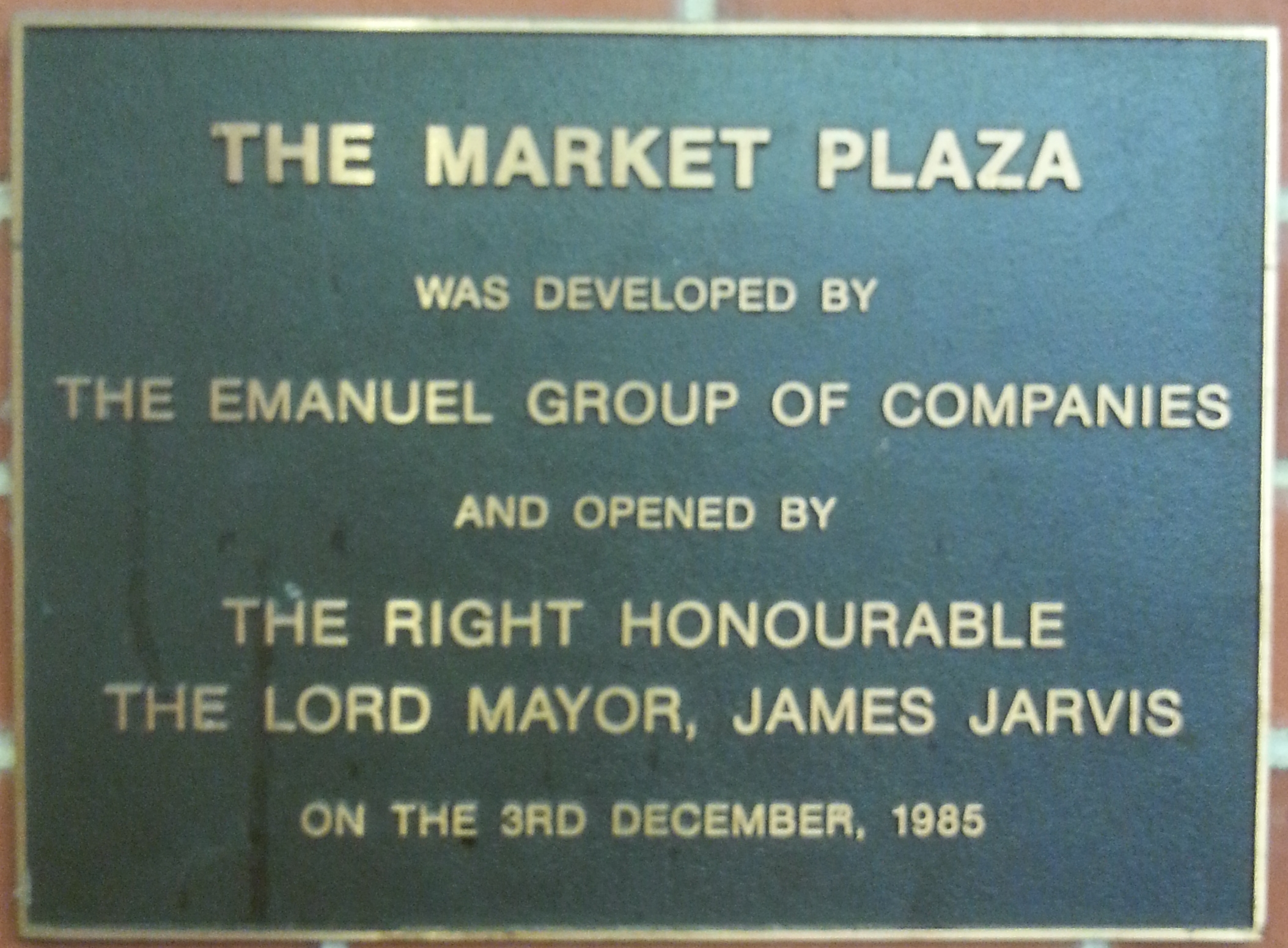
Plaque marking the opening of The Market Plaza by Lord Mayor James Jarvis on 3 December 1985.

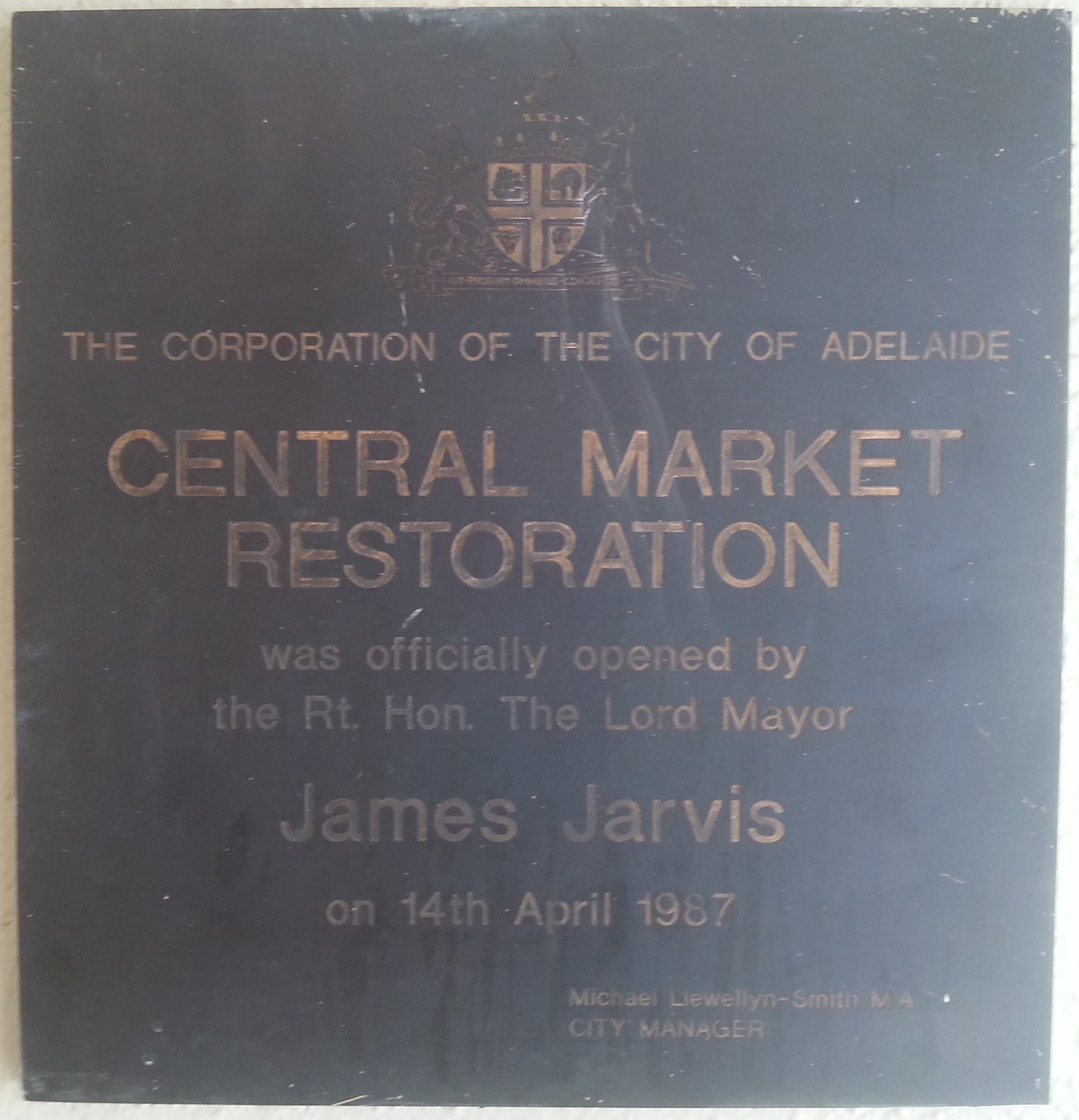
Plaque marking the restoration of the Adelaide Central Market Buildings by Lord Mayor James Jarvis on 14 April 1987. Currently located at the Grote Street entrance.
