= 7th AACTA Awards =

2017 Australian cinema awards

- Date: 4 December 2017 (industry luncheon) and 6 December 2017 (main ceremony)
- Location: The Star Event Centre; Sydney, New South Wales, Australia

Highlights
- Most awards: Film: Lion (12); TV:
- Most nominations: Film: Lion (12); TV: Blue Murder: Killer Cop (11); Top of the Lake: China Girl (11)
- Best Film: Lion
- Best Drama Series: Top of the Lake: China Girl
- Best Comedy Series: Utopia

Television/radio coverage
- Network: Seven Network
- Viewership: 309,000

The 7th Australian Academy of Cinema and Television Arts Awards (generally known as the AACTA Awards) took place on 6 December 2017. Presented by the Australian Academy of Cinema and Television Arts (AACTA), the awards celebrated the best in Australian feature film, television, documentary and short film productions of 2017. A record number of thirty five feature films were submitted for competition. The main ceremony was televised in Australia by the Seven Network.

== Recipients and nominations ==
=== Feature film ===
Best Film: Lion – Emile Sherman, Iain Canning, Angie Fielder; Ali's Wedding – Sheila Jayadev, Helen Panckhurst; Berlin Syndrome – Polly Staniford; Hounds of Love – Melissa Kelly; Jasper Jones – Vincent Sheehan, David Jowsey	Best Direction: Garth Davis – Lion; Jeffrey Walker – Ali's Wedding; Cate Shortland – Berlin Syndrome; Ben Young – Hounds of Love
Best Original Screenplay: Andrew Knight, Osamah Sami – Ali's Wedding; Priscilla Cameron – The Butterfly Tree; Cris Jones – The Death and Life of Otto Bloom; Ben Young – Hounds of Love	Best Adapted Screenplay: Luke Davies – Lion, based on the book A Long Way Home by Saroo Brierley and Larry Buttrose; Shaun Grant – Berlin Syndrome, based on the book Berlin Syndrome by Melanie Joosten; James Greville, Ursula Cleary, Anne Brooksbank – Don't Tell; Shaun Grant, Craig Silvey – Jasper Jones, based on the book Jasper Jones by Craig Silvey
Best Lead Actor: Sunny Pawar as Young Saroo Brierley – Lion; Stephen Curry as John White – Hounds of Love; Ewen Leslie as Al – The Butterfly Tree; Osamah Sami as Ali Albasri – Ali's Wedding	Best Lead Actress: Emma Booth as Evelyn White – Hounds of Love; Teresa Palmer as Clare Havel – Berlin Syndrome; Helana Sawires as Dianne Mohsen – Ali's Wedding; Sara West as Lyndal – Don't Tell
Best Supporting Actor: Dev Patel as Saroo Brierley– Lion; Don Hany as Sheik Mahdi – Ali's Wedding; Jack Thompson as Bob Myers – Don't Tell; Hugo Weaving as Mad Jack Lionel – Jasper Jones	Best Supporting Actress: Nicole Kidman as Sue Brierley – Lion; Frances Duca as Zahra – Ali's Wedding; Jacqueline McKenzie as Jean Dalton – Don't Tell; Susie Porter as Maggie Maloney – Hounds of Love
Best Cinematography: Greig Fraser – Lion; Michael McDermott – Hounds of Love; Stefan Duscio – Jungle; Geoffrey Hall – Red Dog: True Blue	Best Editing: Alexandre de Franceschi – Lion; Nick Meyers – Australia Day; Jack Hutchings – Berlin Syndrome; Merlin Eden – Hounds of Love
Best Original Music Score: Volker Bertelmann, Dustin O'Halloran – Lion; Nigel Westlake – Ali's Wedding; Bryony Marks – Berlin Syndrome; Caitlin Yeo – The Butterfly Tree	Best Sound: Robert Mackenzie, Glenn Newnham, Nakul Kamte, Andrew Ramage, James Ashton, Mario Vaccaro – Lion; Liam Egan, Trevor Hope, Robert Sullivan, Yulia Akerholt, James Andrews, Les Fiddess – Jasper Jones; Serge Lacroix, Cate Cahill, Francis Byrne – Killing Ground; Wayne Pashley, Rick Lisle, Fabian Sanjurgo, Michael Semanick, Gregg Landaker – The LEGO Batman Movie
Best Production Design: Chris Kennedy – Lion; Melinda Doring – Berlin Syndrome; Ben Morieson – The Death and Life of Otto Bloom; Herbert Pinter – Jasper Jones	Best Costume Design: Cappi Ireland – Lion; Maria Pattison – Berlin Syndrome; Tess Schofield – Dance Academy: The Movie; Margot Wilson – Jasper Jones

=== Television ===
Best Drama Series: Top of the Lake: China Girl (Foxtel/BBC First) – Emile Sherman, Iain Canning, Jane Campion, Philippa Campbell, Libby Sharpe; Cleverman (ABC) – Rosemary Blight, Sharon Lark, Ryan Griffen, Jane Allen; Glitch (ABC) – Louise Fox, Tony Ayres, Julie Eckersley, Chris Oliver-Taylor; Janet King – Playing Advantage (ABC) – Lisa Scott, Karl Zwicky, Greg Haddrick; Wentworth (Foxtel/Showcase) – Jo Porter, Pino Amenta	Best Telefeature or Mini Series: Sunshine (SBS) – Ian Collie, Anna McLeish, Sarah Shaw; Blue Murder: Killer Cop (Seven Network) – Carol Hughes, Michael Jenkins; Seven Types of Ambiguity (ABC) – Amanda Higgs, Tony Ayres, Jacquelin Perske; Wake in Fright (Network Ten) – Helen Bowden, Kristian Moliere
Best Comedy Series: Utopia (ABC) – Santo Cilauro, Tom Gleisner, Rob Sitch, Michael Hirsh; No Activity (Stan) – Chloe Rickard; Rosehaven (ABC) – Andrew Walker, Kevin Whyte, Celia Pacquola, Luke McGregor; True Story with Hamish & Andy (Nine Network) – Tim Bartley, Andy Lee, Ryan Shelton, Andrew Walker	Best Children's Series: Little Lunch – The Specials (ABC) – Robyn Butler, Wayne Hope; Mustangs FC (ABC Me) – Amanda Higgs, Rachel Davis; Nowhere Boys – Two Moons Rising (ABC Me) – Beth Frey, Tony Ayres, Michael McMahon; The Wild Adventures of Blinky Bill (7Two) – Barbara Stephen, Alexia Gates-Foale, Tracy Lenon
Best Light Entertainment Series: Australian Ninja Warrior (Nine Network) – Julie Ward, Mark Barlin, Sophia Mogford; Gruen (ABC) – Wil Anderson, Nick Murray, Richard Huddleston, Polly Connolly; Hard Quiz (ABC) – Chris Walker, Kevin Whyte, Charlie Pickering, Tom Gleeson; Julia Zemiro's Home Delivery (ABC) – Damian Davis, Nick Murray, Polly Connolly, Nick Price	Best Reality Series: MasterChef Australia (Network Ten) – Marty Benson, Adam Fergusson, Tim Toni; Australian Survivor (Network Ten) – Peter Newman, Amelia Fisk, Tim Toni, Mark Barlin; Little Big Shots (Seven Network) – Shaun Murphy, Sophia Mogford, Nick Davies; My Kitchen Rules (Seven Network) – Joe Herdman, Matt Apps
Best Direction in a Drama or Comedy: Glendyn Ivin – Seven Types of Ambiguity (ABC) for Episode 2: "Alex"; Jane Campion – Top of the Lake: China Girl (Foxtel/BBC First) for Episode 5: "Who's Your Daddy?"; Leah Purcell – Cleverman (ABC) for Episode 4: "Muya"; Matthew Saville – Please Like Me (ABC) for Episode 4: "Degustation"	Best Direction in a Light Entertainment, Lifestyle or Reality Series: Richard Franc – Australian Survivor (Network Ten) for "Episode 1"; Gary Deans – Australian Ninja Warrior (Nine Network) for "Episode 1"; Damian Davis – Julia Zemiro's Home Delivery (ABC) for Episode 1: "Sam Neill"; Richard Franc – MasterChef Australia (Network Ten) for "Episode 1"
Best Lead Actor – Drama: Hugo Weaving – Seven Types of Ambiguity (ABC); David Dencik – Top of the Lake: China Girl (Foxtel/BBC First); Sean Keenan – Wake in Fright (Network Ten); Richard Roxburgh – Blue Murder: Killer Cop (Seven Network)	Best Lead Actress – Drama: Elisabeth Moss – Top of the Lake: China Girl (Foxtel/BBC First); Toni Collette – Blue Murder: Killer Cop (Seven Network); Marta Dusseldorp – Janet King – Playing Advantage (ABC); Pamela Rabe – Wentworth (Foxtel/Showcase)
Best Guest or Supporting Actor – Drama: Ewen Leslie – Top of the Lake: China Girl (Foxtel/BBC First); Anthony LaPaglia – Sunshine (SBS); Matt Nable – Blue Murder: Killer Cop (Seven Network); David Wenham – Wake in Fright (Network Ten)	Best Guest or Supporting Actress – Drama: Nicole Kidman – Top of the Lake: China Girl (Foxtel/BBC First); Emma Booth – Blue Murder: Killer Cop (Seven Network); Tina Bursill – Doctor Doctor (Nine Network); Andrea Demetriades – Seven Types of Ambiguity (ABC)
Best Comedy Performance: Celia Pacquola – Rosehaven (ABC); Darren Gilshenan – No Activity (Stan); Debra Lawrance – Please Like Me (ABC); Rob Sitch – Utopia (ABC)	Best Screenplay in Television: Jacquelin Perske – Seven Types of Ambiguity (ABC) for Episode 2: "Alex"; Trent O'Donnell – No Activity (Stan) for Episode 3: "Silent Night"; Celia Pacquola and Luke McGregor – Rosehaven (ABC) for "Episode 4"; Santo Cilauro, Tom Gleisner and Rob Sitch – Utopia (ABC) for Episode 5: "Start Up"
Best Cinematography in Television: Bonnie Elliott – Seven Types of Ambiguity (ABC) for Episode 2: "Joe"; Bruce Young – Blue Murder: Killer Cop (Seven Network) for Episode 1: "Part One"; Germain McMicking – Top of the Lake: China Girl (Foxtel/BBC First) for Episode 5: "Who's Your Daddy?"; Geoffrey Hall – Wake In Fright (Network Ten) for Episode 1: "Part 1"	Best Editing in Television: Rodrigo Balart – Seven Types of Ambiguity (ABC) for Episode 1: "Joe"; Bill Russo – Blue Murder: Killer Cop (Seven Network) for Episode 1: "Part One"; Toby Trappel and Karen Crespo – MasterChef Australia (Network Ten) for "Episode 1"; Phil Simon and Santo Cilauro – Utopia (ABC) for Episode 5: "Start Up"
Best Sound in Television: Stephen Smith, Liam Price, Paul Brincat, Shanti Burn and Tony Murtagh – Wake in Fright (Network Ten) for Episode 1: "Part 1"; Tim Chaproniere, Emile De La Ray, Matt Stutter, Paul Brincat, Nigel Scott and Chris Sinclair – Cleverman (ABC) for Episode 3: "Dark Clouds"; Luke Mynott, David Lee and Tony Vaccher – Top of the Lake: China Girl (Foxtel/BBC First) for Episode 4: "Birthday"; Stephen Witherow, Justin Lloyd, Ian MacWilliams, Dan Young, Nigel Croyden and Stefan Kluka – Seven Types of Ambiguity (ABC) for Episode 1: "Joe"	Best Original Music Score in Television: Antony Partos and Matteo Zingales – Wake in Fright (Network Ten) for Episode 1: "Part 1"; Mark Bradshaw – Top of the Lake: China Girl (Foxtel/BBC First) for Episode 4: "Birthday"; John Gray – Blue Murder: Killer Cop (Seven Network) for Episode 1: "Part One"; Samuel Scott, Conrad Wedde, Lukasz Buda and Daniel Rankine – Cleverman (ABC) for Episode 3: "Dark Clouds"
Best Production Design in Television: Fiona Donovan – A Place To Call Home (Foxtel/Showcase) for Episode 2: "Fallout"; Annie Beauchamp – Top of the Lake: China Girl (Foxtel/BBC First) for Episode 4: "Birthday"; Jo Ford – Seven Types of Ambiguity (ABC) for Episode 1: "Joe"; Murray Picknett – Blue Murder: Killer Cop (Seven Network) for Episode 1: "Part One"	Best Costume Design in Television: Damir Peranovic – Blue Murder: Killer Cop (Seven Network) for Episode 1: "Part One"; Lisa Meagher – A Place To Call Home (Foxtel/Showcase) for Episode 2: "Own Worst Enemy"; Emily Seresin – Top of the Lake: China Girl (Foxtel/BBC First) for Episode 4: "Birthday"; Mariot Kerr – Wake in Fright (Network Ten) for Episode 1: "Part 1"

=== Subscription television ===
Subscription Television Award for Best Female Presenter: Margaret Pomeranz – Stage & Screen (Foxtel Arts); Shaynna Blaze – Selling Houses Australia (Foxtel/Lifestyle); Yvonne Sampson – Fox Sports (Foxtel/Fox Sports); Jess Yates – Fox Sports (Foxtel/Fox Sports)	Subscription Television Award for Best Male Presenter: David Speers – PM Agenda and Speers Tonight (Foxtel/Sky News); Paul Murray – Paul Murray Live (Foxtel/Sky News); Neil Oliver – Coast Australia (Foxtel/History); Andrew Winter – Selling Houses Australia (Foxtel/Lifestyle)
Subscription Television Award for Best Live Event Production: Manny Pacquiao vs. Jeff Horn (Foxtel/Fox Sports) – Steve Crawley, Matt Weiss and Joe Bromham; The 7th Annual CMC Music Awards (Foxtel/CMC) – Duane Hatherly; AFLW (Foxtel/Fox Sports) – Michael Neill and Leigh Carlson; Paul Murray Live On The Road (Foxtel/Sky News) – Paul Murray	Subscription Television Award for Best New Talent: Zahra Newman – Wentworth (Foxtel/Showcase); Madeleine Clunies-Ross – A Place to Call Home (Foxtel/Showcase); Matt Okine – The Other Guy (Stan); George Pullar – A Place to Call Home (Foxtel/Showcase); Susie Youssef – No Activity (Stan)

=== Documentary and short film ===
Best Feature Length Documentary: Casting JonBenet – Kitty Green, Scott Macaulay, James Schamus; David Stratton: A Cinematic Life – Jo-anne McGowan; Deep Water: The Real Story – Darren Dale; Whiteley – Sue Clothier, James Bogle, Peta Ayers; Zach's Ceremony – Sarah Linton, Alec Doomadgee	Best Documentary Television Program: War on Waste (ABC) – Jodi Boylan; In My Own Words (NITV) – Darren Dale; Man Up (ABC) – Jennifer Cummins, Danielle Brigham, and Jackie Turnure; Servant Or Slave (NITV) – Mitchell Stanley, Michaela Perske, and Hetti Perkins
Best Short Fiction Film: The Eleven O'Clock – Derin Seale, Josh Lawson, Karen Bryson; Miro – Victoria Wharfe McIntyre, Fran Dobbie, Amadeo Marquez-Perez; Mrs McCutcheon – John Sheedy, Andre Lima, Jenny Vila; Slapper – Luci Schroder, Jason Byrne, Michael Latham, Stephanie Westwood	Best Short Animation: Lost Property Office – Daniel Agdag, Liz Kearney; After All – Michael Cusack, Richard Chataway; Barbara – Larissa Behrendt, Marieka Walsh, Kiki Dillon, Michaela Perske; The Wall – Nick Baker, Tristan Klein
Best Direction in a Documentary: James Bogle – Whiteley; Bentley Dean, Martin Butler and Liz Jackson – A Sense of Self (ABC); Kitty Green – Casting JonBenet; Amanda Blue – Deep Water: The Real Story	Best Cinematography in a Documentary: Jody Muston and Jon Shaw – Blue; Simon Morris – Deep Water: The Real Story; Simon Chapman – Servant or Slave (NITV); Abraham Joffe – Tales by Light (Foxtel/National Geographic) for Episode 3: "Life and Death"
Best Editing in a Documentary: Lawrie Silvestrin – Whiteley; Vanessa Milton – Blue; Terry Carlyon – Conviction (ABC); Orly Danon – The Surgery Ship (Foxtel/Nat Geo People) for Episode 1: "The Power of Yes & No"	Best Sound in a Documentary: Ric Curtin, John Simpson and Lawrie Silvestrin – Whitely; David White, Cate Cahill, Dan Miau and Sarah Henty – Blue; Ben Banks and Keith Thomas – Conviction (ABC); Keith Thomas, Livia Ruzic and Mark Tarpey – The Family
Best Original Music Score in a Documentary: Ash Gibson Greig – Whiteley; Ash Gibson Greig – Blue; Amanda Brown – The Family; George Papanicolaou – Servant or Slave (NITV)

=== Additional awards ===
Best Asian Film: Dangal (India) – Aamir Khan, Kiran Rao and Siddharth Roy Kapur; Birdshot (Philippines) – Pamela L. Reyes; I Am Not Madame Bovary (China) – Wang Zhonglei, Zhou Maofei and Hu Xiaofeng; Kaasav: Turtle (India) – Mohan Agashe, Sunil Sukthankar and Sumitra Bhave; Our Time Will Come (China) – Roger Lee, Stephen Lam and Ann Hui; Pink (India) – Shoojit Sircar, Rashmi Sharma, Ronnie Lahiri and Sheel Kumar; Train to Busan (South Korea) – Lee Dong-ha; Wolf Warrior II (China) – Zhang Miao and Guang Hailong; Your Name (Japan) – Genki Kawamura, Katsuhiro Takei, Kouichurou Itou and Yoshihiro Furusawa	Best Online Video or Series: RackaRacka – Danny Philippou, Michael Philippou, Judd Wild and Timani Seve; Doodles – Charlie Aspinwall, Daley Pearson, Meg O'Connell and Benjamin Zaugg; High Life – Luke Eve and Adam Dolman; Superwog – Paul Walton, Theodore Saidden and Nathan Saidden; The Katering Show Tamasin Simpkin, Kate McCartney, Kate McLennan and Kevin Whyte
Best Visual Effects or Animation: Joe Bauer, Steve Kullback, Glenn Melenhorst, Ineke Majoor, Josh Simmonds – Game of Thrones (Season 7), episode 4: "The Spoils of War" (Showcase); Jason Billington, James Whitlam, Linda Luong – Deepwater Horizon; Brendan Seals, Steven Swanson, Raphael A. Pimentel, Andrew Zink – Doctor Strange; Rob Coleman, Amber Naismith, Miles Green, Damien Gray, Craig Welsh – The Lego Batman Movie	Best Hair and Makeup: Katherine Brown, Troy Follington, Simon Joseph – Cleverman (ABC); Nikki Gooley, Sheldon Wade – Blue Murder: Killer Cop (Seven Network); Hayley Atherton, Kate Anderson – Hounds of Love; Jen Lamphee, Anna Gray, Melissa Chew – Science Fiction Volume One: The Osiris Child

=== Special awards ===
- Longford Lyell Award – Phillip Noyce (director)
- Trailblazer Award – Simon Baker (actor)
- Byron Kennedy Award – Martin Butler and Bentley Dean (filmmakers)
