= Sunstar Entertainment =

Australian talent management company

Sunstar Entertainment is an independent film production and talent management company, founded in 2011 by Andrew Fraser and Shahen Mekertichian. Sunstar Entertainment operates out of Sydney, Australia. The company has a heavy focus on producing films and television shows based on true Australian stories, including the 2016 film Lion, directed by Garth Davis.

== Film Projects ==
In 2012, Sunstar optioned the rights to Indian-born Australian businessman Saroo Brierley’s book, A Long Way Home, which was co-written by Australian author Larry Buttrose. In 2013, Sunstar Entertainment partnered with See-Saw Films to adapt the book into a film titled Lion, directed by Garth Davis and starring Dev Patel, Nicole Kidman, Rooney Mara and David Wenham. Lion was co-produced by Sunstar Entertainment, See-Saw Films, Aquarius Films, Screen Australia and The Weinstein Company. Founders of Sunstar Entertainment Andrew Fraser and Shahen Mekertichian were Executive Producers on the film.

The film premiered at the 2016 Toronto International Film Festival where it received early Oscar buzz and was released for international distribution by The Weinstein Company on November 25, 2016.

In 2013 Sunstar Entertainment was announced as a producer on True Spirit, a film about the true story of Australian sailor Jessica Watson who became the youngest person to sail solo around the world non stop at the age of 16. The film is due to be released in 2020.

In 2015, Sunstar Entertainment optioned the rights to the story of Australian athlete John Maclean. Maclean became a paraplegic following a truck accident and was the first person in a wheelchair to compete in the Ironman World Championship and swim the English Channel.

== Talent Management ==
Sunstar Entertainment represents a number of Australian sporting identities and celebrities, including around the world sailor, Jessica Watson and Australian cricketer, Mitchell Starc and Australian sportswoman Ellyse Perry.
