= Burhanpur railway station =

Railway station in Madhya Pradesh

Burhanpur
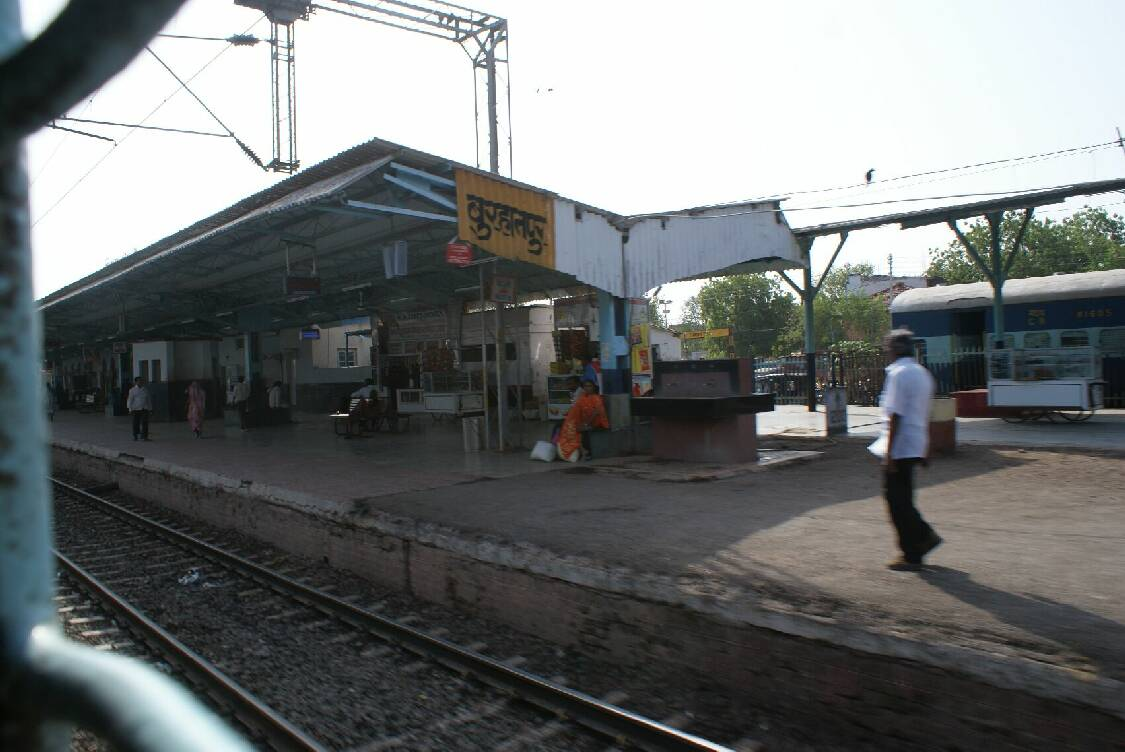

General information
- Location: Lalbagh, Burhanpur, Madhya Pradesh; India
- Coordinates: 21°20′05″N 76°11′58″E
- Elevation: 267 metres (876 ft)
- System: Indian Railways station
- Owner: Indian Railways
- Operator: Central Railway
- Line: Jabalpur–Bhusaval section
- Platforms: 2
- Tracks: 4
- Connections: Auto stand

Construction
- Structure type: Standard (on-ground station)
- Parking: Yes
- Cycle facilities: No

Other information
- Status: Functioning
- Station code: BAU
- Zone(s): Central Railway
- Division(s): Bhusawal
Location
- Interactive map

Burhanpur railway station is a main railway station in Burhanpur district, Madhya Pradesh. Its code is BAU. It serves Burhanpur city. The station consists of two platforms.

== Popular culture ==
Indian-born Australian author Saroo Brierley became separated from his brother at this station after falling asleep on a decommissioned train heading to Kolkata, leading to a 25-year separation from his family. Brierley was later able to find his hometown and reunite with his mother by identifying the station on Google Earth, the subject of his book A Long Way Home and the 2016 film Lion.

== Major trains ==
Some of the important trains that runs from Burhanpur are:

- Sachkhand Express
- Dadadham Intercity Express
- Kolkata Mail
- Mangala Lakshadweep Express
- Pune–Danapur Superfast Express
- Punjab Mail
- Karnataka Express
- Lashkar Express
- Bhagalpur–Lokmanya Tilak Terminus Superfast Express
- Jhelum Express
- Mumbai CST–Amritsar Express
- Mahanagari Express
