= See-Saw Films =

British-Australian film and television production company

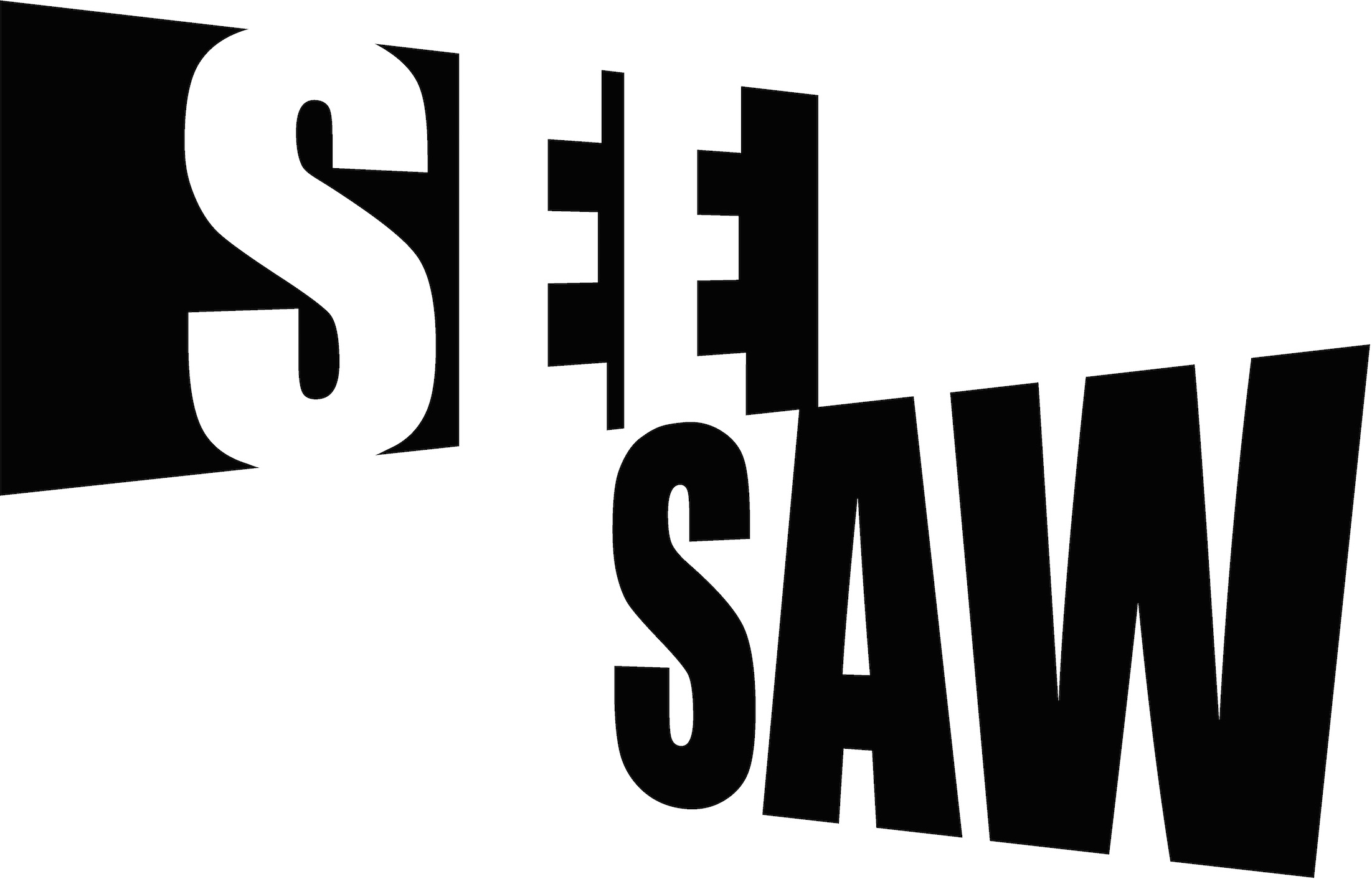
- Industry: Motion picture
- Founded: 2008; 18 years ago
- Founder: Iain Canning; Emile Sherman
- Headquarters: London, UK; Sydney, Australia
- Key people: Iain Canning; Emile Sherman
- Products: Film production Television production
- Parent: Mediawan (51%)
- Website: see-saw-films.com

See-Saw Films is a British-Australian film and television production company founded in 2008 by Iain Canning and Emile Sherman, with offices in London and Sydney. Their productions include The King's Speech, Top Of The Lake, Lion, The Power of the Dog, Slow Horses, and the British teen series Heartstopper.

== History ==
Producers Iain Canning and Emile Sherman co-founded See-Saw Films in 2008.

In 2011, See-Saw won the Academy Award for Best Picture for their film The King's Speech directed by Tom Hooper. The film stars Colin Firth, Geoffrey Rush and Helena Bonham Carter.

See-Saw's first television series was Top Of The Lake, directed by Jane Campion and starring Elisabeth Moss and Holly Hunter. The first series released in 2013 and was nominated for eight Emmy Awards and two Golden Globe Awards. The second series, Top Of The Lake: China Girl, also directed by Campion, premiered at the Cannes Film Festival 2017. Elisabeth Moss reprises her role as Detective Robin Griffin in Top Of The Lake: China Girl, which also stars Nicole Kidman and Gwendoline Christie.

See-Saw produced Lion, which premiered in 2016 at the Toronto International Film Festival and stars Dev Patel, Nicole Kidman and Rooney Mara. The film was nominated for six Academy Awards, won two BAFTA Awards, and won 12 AACTA Awards.

In 2019, See-Saw produced short-form British comedy series, State of the Union, which premiered on Sundance TV. The first season won three Emmy Awards and stars Rosamund Pike and Chris O'Dowd. In 2021, the series was renewed for a second season and stars Brendan Gleeson and Patricia Clarkson.

In 2021 releases included British TV series The North Water, written and directed by Andrew Haigh, starring Jack O'Connell and Colin Farrell; and Australian TV series Firebite, written by Warwick Thornton and Brendan Fletcher and directed by Thornton, Fletcher and Tony Krawitz. Both series premiered on AMC+ in the United States.

Toward the end of 2021, Netflix released The Power of the Dog, which is See-Saw's second collaboration with Jane Campion. In 2022, the film won two BAFTAs including Best Film, and was nominated for 12 Academy Awards, with Jane Campion going on to win Best Director. The film originally premiered at the 78th Venice International Film Festival and Campion was awarded the Silver Lion for Best Director.

TV released in 2022 include Slow Horses seasons one and two and The Essex Serpent for Apple TV+, and Heartstopper season one for Netflix. See-Saw's films that released in 2022 were Operation Mincemeat and The Stranger. Florian Zeller's The Son premiered at the 79th Venice International Film Festival and will release theatrically in early 2023.

In March 2025, French media conglomerate Mediawan acquired a 51% majority stake in See-Saw Films in a cash and stock deal for an undisclosed sum.

== People ==
Iain Canning and Emile Sherman co-founded the company, and as of June 2022 remain co-managing directors.

Executive producer of television in the UK, Patrick Walters, joined the company in 2014 and was promoted in 2018 to head of TV development in the UK, US and Australia as well as serving as executive producer on selected UK productions.

Simon Gillis is chief operating officer.

== Subsidiaries and associated companies ==
See-Saw has an in-house sales arm, Cross City Films, which handles international sales of its titles in select territories.

Between 2019 and 2020, See-Saw Films launched joint venture production companies I Am That with Lion director Garth Davis, and Picking Scabs with Samantha Strauss, creator and screenwriter of the Fox Showcase/Sky Atlantic television series The End. I Am That's 50-50 partnership with See-Saw develops feature film and TV projects for Davis to direct and produce alongside See-Saw's managing directors, Canning and Sherman, while Picking Scabs develops projects for Strauss to write and produce with See-Saw

== Productions ==
=== Film ===
Year	Film	Director	Writer	Notes
2009	Linear	Anton Corbijn		
2010	Oranges and Sunshine	Jim Loach	Rona Munro	Nominated – AACTA Award for Best Film; Nominated – AFI Members' Choice Award; Nominated – FCCA Award for Best Film; Nominated – Inside Film Award for Best Feature Film
2010	The Kings of Mykonos	Peter Andrikidis		Nominated – AFI Readers' Choice Award
2010	The King's Speech	Tom Hooper	David Seidler	Academy Award for Best Picture; BAFTA Award for Best Film; Alexander Korda Award for Best British Film; PGA Award for Best Theatrical Motion Picture; Nominated – EDA Award for Best Picture; Nominated – ACCA Award for Best Motion Picture; Nominated – Davis Award for Best Motion Picture; Nominated – European Film Award for Best Film; Nominated – Online Film & Television Association Award for Best Film
2011	Shame	Steve McQueen	Steve McQueen; Abi Morgan	Nominated – Alexander Korda Award for Best British Film; Nominated – European Film Award for Best Film; Nominated – Online Film & Television Association Award for Best Film
2012	Dead Europe	Tony Krawitz	Louise Fox	Nominated – AACTA Award for Best Film; Nominated – FCCA Award
2013	Tracks	John Curran	Marion Nelson	Nominated – AACTA Award for Best Film; Nominated – AFCA Award for Best Film; Nominated – FCCA Award
2015	Life	Anton Corbijn	Luke Davies	
2015	Macbeth	Justin Kurzel	Jacob Koskoff; Michael Lesslie; Todd Louiso	
2015	Mr. Holmes	Bill Condon	Jeffrey Hatcher	
2015	Slow West	John Maclean	John Maclean	
2016	Lion	Garth Davis	Luke Davies	Nominated – Academy Award for Best Picture; Nominated – AACTA International Award for Best Film; Nominated – Critics' Choice Movie Award for Best Picture; Nominated – Golden Globe Award for Best Motion Picture – Drama; Nominated – Satellite Award for Best Film; Nominated – Online Film & Television Association Award for Best Film; Nominated – PGA Award for Outstanding Producer of Theatrical Motion Pictures
2017	How to Talk to Girls at Parties	John Cameron Mitchell	Philippa Goslett; John Cameron Mitchell	
2018	Mary Magdalene	Garth Davis	Helen Edmundson; Philippa Goslett	
2018	Widows	Steve McQueen	Gillian Flynn; Steve McQueen	
2019	The Day Shall Come	Chris Morris	Chris Morris; Jesse Armstrong	
2020	Ammonite	Francis Lee	Francis Lee	
2021	The Power of the Dog	Jane Campion	Jane Campion	BAFTA Award for Best Film; Critics' Choice Award for Best Picture; AACTA International Award for Best Film; Golden Globe Award for Best Motion Picture – Drama; Nominated - Academy Award for Best Picture; Nominated - PGA Award for Outstanding Producer of Theatrical Motion Pictures
2022	Operation Mincemeat	John Madden	Michelle Ashford	
2022	The Stranger	Thomas M. Wright	Thomas M. Wright	Premiered in Un Certain Regard at 75th Cannes Film Festival
2022	The Son	Florian Zeller	Florian Zeller, Christopher Hampton	
2023	Foe	Garth Davis	Iain Reid and Garth Davis	
2023	The Royal Hotel	Kitty Green	Kitty Green and Oscar Redding	
2023	One Life	James Hawes	Lucinda Coxon and Nick Drake	
2026	Heartstopper Forever	Wash Westmoreland	Alice Oseman	
2026	Tenzing	Jennifer Peedom	Luke Davies	
TBA	Wizards!	David Michôd	David Michôd	

=== Television ===
Year	Show	Writer	Director	Notes
2013	Top of the Lake	Jane Campion, Gerard Lee	Jane Campion, Garth Davis	AACTA Award for Best Telefeature or Miniseries; New Zealand Film and TV Awards for Best Television Feature or Drama; Nominated – Emmy for Outstanding Miniseries or Movie; Nominated – PGA Award for Outstanding Producer of Long-Form Television
2015	Banished	Jimmy McGovern, Shaun Duggan	Daniel Percival, Jeffrey Walker	Nominated – AACTA Award for Best Telefeature or Miniseries
2016	Codes of Conduct	Matthew Michael Carnahan	Steve McQueen	
2016	Love, Nina	Nick Hornby, Nina Stibbe	S.J. Clarkson	
2017	Top of the Lake: China Girl	Jane Campion, Gerard Lee	Jane Campion, Ariel Kleiman	Nominated – Golden Globe Award for Best Television Limited Series or Motion Picture Made for Television
2018	The New Legends of Monkey	Jacquelin Perske	Gerald Johnstone	Nominated - AACTA Award for Best Children's Television Series
2019—2022	State of the Union	Nick Hornby	Stephen Frears	Emmy Award for Outstanding Short Form Comedy or Drama Series
2020	The End	Samantha Strauss	Jessica M. Thompson; Jonathan Brough	Nominated — AACTA Award for Best Miniseries or Telefeature
2021	The North Water	Andrew Haigh	Andrew Haigh	
2021	Firebite	Warwick Thornton; Brendan Fletcher	Warwick Thornton; Brendan Fletcher; Tony Krawitz	
2022—	Slow Horses	Will Smith; Morwenna Banks; Mark Denton; Jonny Stockwood	James Hawes; Jeremy Lovering; Saul Metzstein; Adam Randall	Nominated – Emmy for Outstanding Drama Series Nominated – Golden Globe Award for Best Television Series – Drama
2022—2026	Heartstopper	Alice Oseman	Euros Lyn	Children's and Family Emmys Award for Outstanding Young Teen Series
2022	The Essex Serpent	Anna Symon	Clio Barnard	
2024—	Sweetpea	Kirstie Swain	Ella Jones	
2025	Apple Cider Vinegar	Samantha Strauss	Jeffrey Walker	
