= Emile Sherman =

Australian film producer (born 1972)

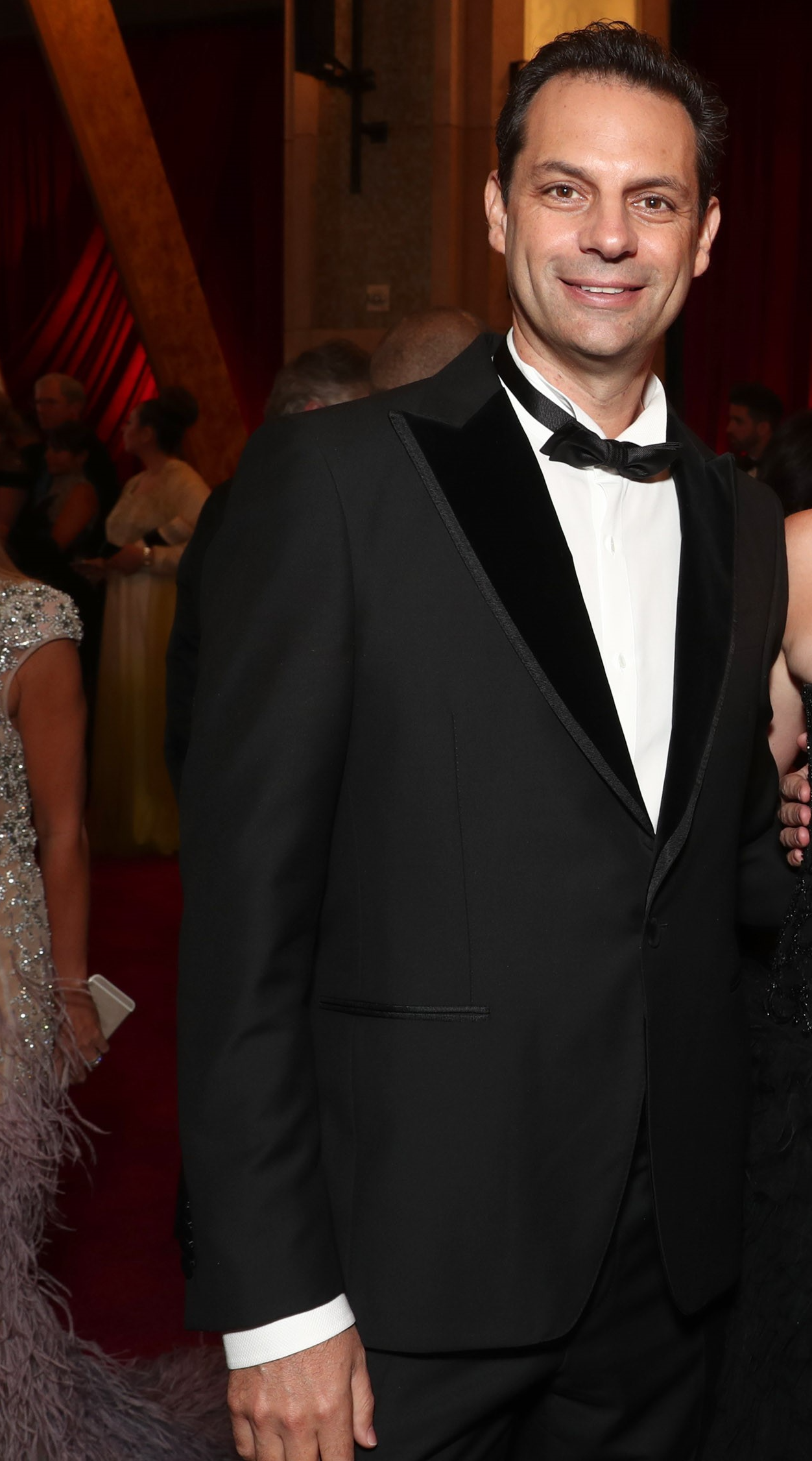
- Emile Sherman at the Oscars, 2017
- Born: June 1972 (age 53–54)
- Occupation: Producer
- Title: Managing director and co-founder of See-Saw Films

Emile Paul Sherman (born June 1972) is an Australian film and television producer best known for producing the film The King's Speech (2010), for which he won an Academy Award for Best Picture and the BAFTA award for Best Film and Best British Film, and for executive producing television series Top of the Lake, which was nominated for an Emmy, BAFTA and Golden Globe award. He has been nominated for three Academy Awards and won one; nominated for five BAFTAs and won three, and nominated for two Emmy Awards and won one.

Emile co-founded See-Saw Films with producing partner Iain Canning in 2008. Their offices are based in Sydney, Australia and London, UK.

== Early life and education ==
Emile Sherman graduated from the University of New South Wales with degrees in arts and law, as well as a masters in arts. He is Jewish.

== Career ==
Sherman was co-executive producer on Rabbit-Proof Fence (2002), starring Kenneth Branagh and directed by Phillip Noyce. Feature films produced by him in the 2000s include Candy (2006) starring Heath Ledger and Geoffrey Rush, and Disgrace (2008) based on J. M. Coetzee's Booker Prize-winning novel of the same name.

Sherman co-founded See-Saw Films with UK producer Iain Canning in 2008.

Sherman produced Jane Campion's Emmy Award-nominated TV series Top of the Lake (2013). The second series, Top of the Lake: China Girl, also directed by Campion, premiered at the Cannes Film Festival in 2017.

In 2016 Sherman produced Lion, winner of two BAFTA Awards, starring Dev Patel, Nicole Kidman and Rooney Mara.

In 2019, Sherman produced short-form British comedy series, State of the Union, which premiered on Sundance TV. The first season starred Rosamund Pike and Chris O'Dowd and won three Emmy Awards including Outstanding Short Form Comedy or Drama Series. In 2021, the series was renewed for a second season starring Brendan Gleeson and Patricia Clarkson.

In 2021, two TV series produced by Sherman were released: British TV series The North Water, written and directed by Andrew Haigh, starring Jack O'Connell and Colin Farrell, and Australian TV series Firebite, written by Warwick Thornton and Brendan Fletcher and directed by Thornton, Fletcher and Tony Krawitz.

In November 2021, Netflix released The Power of the Dog, starring Benedict Cumberbatch, Kodi Smit-McPhee, Kirsten Dunst and Jesse Plemons, See-Saw's second collaboration with Jane Campion. In 2022, the film won two BAFTAs including Best Film, and was nominated for 12 Academy Awards, with Campion going on to win Best Director. The film originally premiered at the 78th Venice International Film Festival and Campion was awarded the Silver Lion for Best Director.

See-Saw's TV projects set to release in 2022 include Slow Horses and The Essex Serpent for Apple TV+, and Heartstopper for Netflix. Upcoming films include Operation Mincemeat; Quick The Stranger; and Florian Zeller's The Son.

In April 2022, Screen Australia announced funding for Immersion, a science fiction drama TV series to be directed by Garth Davis, written by Matt Vesely (Aftertaste) and executive produced by Sherman and director/producer Samantha Lang.

== Other roles ==
In addition to his Managing Director role at See-Saw Films, Sherman is a director of Fulcrum Media Finance, a subsidiary of the company. Fulcrum Media Finance is a specialist film and television financier, providing cashflow for the Australian Producer Offset, Location and PDV Offsets as well as the New Zealand Screen Production Grant and the United Kingdom Film Tax Credit. Fulcrum has provided over $200 million in finance to film and television projects to date.

In 2019, Sherman and Canning teamed up with Garth Davis to form a new production company called I AM THAT, with Samantha Lang as head of development.

Sherman is also a director of animal protection institute Voiceless, and a director of the Sydney Writers’ Festival.

In 2021, Sherman launched a podcast with Lloyd Vogelman called Principle of Charity. In the podcast, the hosts bring together two expert guests with opposing views on big social issues, and in addition to passionately advocating their own views, each guest is challenged to present the best, most generous version of the other’s argument.

In December 2024, he was appointed to the Art Gallery of NSW Board of Trustees.

== Awards ==
- 2011: Academy Award for The King's Speech directed by Tom Hooper, starring Colin Firth, Geoffrey Rush and Helena Bonham Carter.

== Filmography ==
=== Film ===
Year	Film	Director	Writer	Notes
2000	Sample People	Clinton Smith		
2000	Uncle Chatzkel	Rod Freedman		
2002	Rabbit-Proof Fence	Phillip Noyce	Christine Olsen	
2003	Ned	Abe Forsythe	Abe Forsythe	
2003	The Honourable Wally Norman	Ted Emery	Andrew JonesRick Kalowski	
2003	The Night We Called It a Day	Paul Goldman	Peter CliftonMichael Thomas	
2004	Oyster Farmer	Anna Reeves	Anna Reeves	
2006	Candy	Neil Armfield	Neil Armfield Luke Davies	Nominated – AFI Award for Best Film
2006	Opal Dream	Peter Cattaneo	Peter Cattaneo Ben Rice Phil Traill	
2008	$9.99	Tatia Rosenthal	Etgar KeretTatia Rosenthal	
2008	Disgrace	Steve Jacobs	Anna Maria Monticelli	Nominated – FCCA Award for Best Film
2009	Linear	Anton Corbijn		
2010	Oranges and Sunshine	Jim Loach	Rona Munro	Nominated – AACTA Award for Best Film; Nominated – AFI Members' Choice Award; Nominated – FCCA Award for Best Film; Nominated – Inside Film Award for Best Feature Film
2010	South Solitary	Shirley Barrett	Shirley Barrett	
2010	The Kings of Mykonos	Peter Andrikidis		Nominated – AFI Readers' Choice Award
2010	The King's Speech	Tom Hooper	David Seidler	Academy Award for Best Picture; BAFTA Award for Best Film; Alexander Korda Award for Best British Film; PGA Award for Best Theatrical Motion Picture; Nominated – ACCA Award for Best Motion Picture; Nominated – Davis Award for Best Motion Picture; Nominated – EDA Award for Best Picture; Nominated – European Film Award for Best Film; Nominated – Online Film & Television Association Award for Best Film
2011	Shame	Steve McQueen	Steve McQueen, Abi Morgan	Nominated – Alexander Korda Award for Best British Film; Nominated – Black Reel Award for Best Film; Nominated – European Film Award for Best Film; Nominated – Online Film & Television Association Award for Best Film
2012	Dead Europe	Tony Krawitz	Louise Fox	Nominated – AACTA Award for Best Film; Nominated – FCCA Award
2013	Tracks	John Curran	Marion Nelson	Nominated – AACTA Award for Best Film; Nominated – AFCA Award for Best Film; Nominated – FCCA Award
2015	Life	Anton Corbijn	Luke Davies	
2015	Macbeth	Justin Kurzel	Jacob Koskoff, Michael Lesslie, Todd Louiso	
2015	Mr. Holmes	Bill Condon	Jeffrey Hatcher	
2015	Slow West	John Maclean	John Maclean	
2016	Lion	Garth Davis	Luke Davies	Nominated – Academy Award for Best Picture; Nominated – AACTA International Award for Best Film; Nominated – Critics' Choice Movie Award for Best Picture; Nominated – Golden Globe Award for Best Motion Picture – Drama; Nominated – Online Film & Television Association Award for Best Film; Nominated – PGA Award for Outstanding Producer of Theatrical Motion Pictures; Nominated – Satellite Award for Best Film
2017	How to Talk to Girls at Parties	John Cameron Mitchell	Philippa Goslett, John Cameron Mitchell	
2018	Mary Magdalene	Garth Davis	Helen Edmundson, Philippa Goslett	
2018	Widows	Steve McQueen	Gillian Flynn, Steve McQueen	
2019	The Day Shall Come	Chris Morris	Chris Morris, Jesse Armstrong	
2020	Ammonite	Francis Lee	Francis Lee	
2021	The Power of the Dog	Jane Campion	Jane Campion	BAFTA Award for Best Film; Golden Globe Award for Best Motion Picture – Drama; Critics' Choice Movie Award for Best Picture; Nominated – Academy Award for Best Picture; Nominated – PGA Award for Outstanding Producer of Theatrical Motion Pictures
2022	Operation Mincemeat	John Madden	Michelle Ashford	Post-production
2022	The Stranger	Thomas M. Wright	Thomas M. Wright	Premiered in Un Certain Regard at the 75th Cannes Film Festival
2022	The Son	Florian Zeller	Florian Zeller, Christopher Hampton	
2026	Tenzing	Jennifer Peedom	Luke Davies	Post-production

=== Television ===
Year	TV Series	Writer	Director	Notes
2013	Top of the Lake	Jane Campion, Gerard Lee	Jane Campion, Garth Davis	Nominated – Emmy for Outstanding Miniseries or Movie AACTA Award for Best Telefeature or Miniseries New Zealand Film and TV Awards for Best Television Feature or Drama Nominated – PGA Award for Outstanding Producer of Long-Form Television
2015	Banished	Jimmy McGovern, Shaun Duggan	Daniel Percival, Jeffrey Walker	Nominated – AACTA Award for Best Telefeature or Miniseries
2016	Codes of Conduct	Matthew Michael Carnahan	Steve McQueen	
2016	Love, Nina	Nick Hornby, Nina Stibbe	SJ Clarkson	
2017	Top of the Lake: China Girl	Jane Campion, Gerard Lee	Jane Campion, Ariel Kleiman	Nominated – Golden Globe Award for Best Television Limited Series or Motion Picture Made for Television
2017	The Legend of Monkey		Gerard Johnstone	
2019	State of the Union	Nick Hornby	Stephen Frears	International Emmy Award for Short Form Series
2020	The End	Samantha Strauss	Jessica M. Thompson, Jonathan Brough	Nominated - AACTA Award for Best Miniseries or Telefeature
2021	The North Water	Andrew Haigh	Andrew Haigh	
2021	Firebite	Warwick Thornton, Brendan Fletcher	Warwick Thornton, Brendan Fletcher, Tony Krawitz	
2022	Slow Horses	Will Smith, Morwenna Banks, Mark Denton, Jonny Stockwood	James Hawes	
2022	Heartstopper	Alice Oseman	Euros Lyn	Post-production
2022	The Essex Serpent	Anna Symon	Clio Barnard	
2024	Sweetpea	Kirstie Swain	Ella Jones	
2025	Apple Cider Vinegar	Samantha Strauss	Jeffrey Walker	

=== Music Videos ===
Year	Music Video	Director	Notes
2013	Arcade Fire: Reflektor	Anton Corbijn	
