= Iain Canning =

English film producer

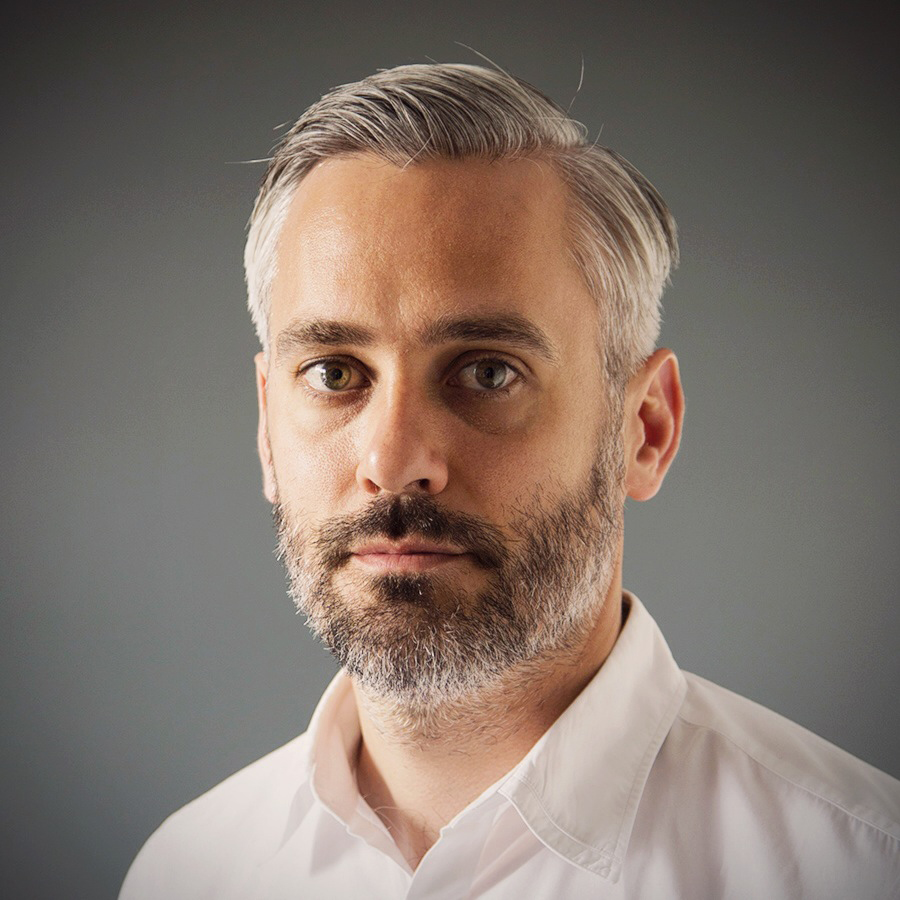
- Born: July 1979 (age 46)
- Occupation: Producer
- Title: Managing director and co-founder of See-Saw Films

Iain Alexander Canning (born July 1979) is an English film and television producer best known for producing the film The King's Speech (2010), for which he won an Academy Award for Best Picture and the BAFTA award for Best Film and Best British Film, and for executive producing television series Top of the Lake, which was nominated for an Emmy, BAFTA and Golden Globe award. He has been nominated for 3 Academy Awards and won 1, nominated for 5 BAFTAs and won 3, and nominated for 2 Emmy Awards and won 1. 9 Iain co-founded See-Saw Films with producing partner Emile Sherman in 2008. Their offices are based in London, UK and Sydney, Australia.

== Career ==
Iain Canning co-founded See-Saw Films with Emile Sherman in 2008 and has produced several major films including Lion, winner of two BAFTA Awards, starring Dev Patel, Nicole Kidman and Rooney Mara, and The Power of the Dog, starring Benedict Cumberbatch, Kodi Smit-McPhee, Kirsten Dunst and Jesse Plemons. Canning produced Jane Campion's Emmy Award-nominated TV series Top of the Lake. The second series, Top of the Lake: China Girl, also directed by Campion, premiered at the Cannes Film Festival 2017. Elisabeth Moss reprised her Golden Globe-winning role as Detective Robin Griffin, which also starred Nicole Kidman and Gwendoline Christie.

Canning won an Academy Award in 2011 for The King's Speech directed by Tom Hooper. The film stars Colin Firth, Geoffrey Rush and Helena Bonham Carter

In 2019, Canning produced short-form British comedy series, State of the Union, which premiered on Sundance TV. The first season starred Rosamund Pike and Chris O'Dowd and won three Emmy Awards including Outstanding Short Form Comedy or Drama Series. In 2021, the series was renewed for a second season starring Brendan Gleeson and Patricia Clarkson.

Also in 2019, Canning and Sherman teamed up with Garth Davis to form a new production company called I AM THAT, with Samantha Lang as head of development.

2021 saw the releases of British TV series The North Water, written and directed by Andrew Haigh, starring Jack O'Connell and Colin Farrell, and Australian TV series Firebite, written by Warwick Thornton and Brendan Fletcher and directed by Thornton, Fletcher and Tony Krawitz. Both series premiered on AMC+ in the United States.

In November 2021, Netflix released The Power of the Dog, which is See-Saw's second collaboration with Jane Campion. In 2022, the film won 2 BAFTAs including Best Film, and was nominated for 12 Academy Awards, with Jane Campion going on to win Best Director. The film originally premiered at the 78th Venice International Film Festival and Campion was awarded the Silver Lion for Best Director.

See-Saw's latest TV projects to release in 2022 include Slow Horses and The Essex Serpent for Apple TV+, and Heartstopper for Netflix. Upcoming films include Operation Mincemeat, which stars Colin Firth, Matthew Macfadyen, Kelly Macdonald, Penelope Winton and Johnny Flynn; The Stranger, which stars Sean Harris and Joel Edgerton; and Florian Zeller's The Son, which stars Hugh Jackman, Laura Dern, Vanessa Kirby and Zen McGrath.

Prior to founding See-Saw, Canning executive-produced the award-winning films Hunger directed by McQueen and Anton Corbijn's Control.

== Filmography ==
=== Film ===
| Year | Film | Director | Writer | Notes |
|---|---|---|---|---|
| 2006 | Candy | Neil Armfield | Neil Armfield; Luke Davies | |
| 2007 | Control | Anton Corbijn | Matt Greenhalgh | |
| 2008 | Hunger | Steve McQueen | Enda Walsh; Steve McQueen | |
| 2009 | Mary and Max | Adam Elliot | Adam Elliot | |
| 2010 | Oranges and Sunshine | Jim Loach | Rona Munro | Nominated – AACTA Award for Best Film; Nominated – AFI Members' Choice Award; Nominated – FCCA Award for Best Film; Nominated – Inside Film Award for Best Feature Film |
| 2010 | The Kings of Mykonos | Peter Andrikidis | | |
| 2010 | The King's Speech | Tom Hooper | David Seidler | Academy Award for Best Picture; BAFTA Award for Best Film; BAFTA Alexander Korda Award for Best British Film; PGA Award for Best Theatrical Motion Picture; Nominated – ACCA Award for Best Motion Picture; Nominated – Davis Award for Best Motion Picture; Nominated – EDA Award for Best Picture; Nominated – European Film Award for Best Film; Nominated – Online Film & Television Association Award for Best Film |
| 2011 | Shame | Steve McQueen | Steve McQueen, Abi Morgan | Nominated – BAFTA Alexander Korda Award for Best British Film; Nominated – Black Reel Award for Best Film; Nominated – European Film Award for Best Film; Nominated – Online Film & Television Association Award for Best Film |
| 2012 | Anton Corbijn Inside Out | Klaartje Quirijns | | |
| 2012 | Dead Europe | Tony Krawitz | Louise Fox | Nominated – AACTA Award for Best Film; Nominated – FCCA Award |
| 2013 | Tracks | John Curran | Marion Nelson | Nominated – AACTA Award for Best Film; Nominated – AFCA Award for Best Film; Nominated – FCCA Award |
| 2015 | Life | Anton Corbijn | Luke Davies | |
| 2015 | Macbeth | Justin Kurzel | Jacob Koskoff, Michael Lesslie, Todd Louiso | |
| 2015 | Mr. Holmes | Bill Condon | Jeffrey Hatcher | |
| 2015 | Slow West | John Maclean | John Maclean | |
| 2016 | Lion | Garth Davis | Luke Davies | AACTA Award for Best Film; Nominated – Academy Award for Best Picture; Nominated – AACTA International Award for Best Film; Nominated – Critics' Choice Movie Award for Best Picture; Nominated – Golden Globe Award for Best Motion Picture – Drama; Nominated – Online Film & Television Association Award for Best Film; Nominated – PGA Award for Outstanding Producer of Theatrical Motion Pictures; Nominated – Satellite Award for Best Film |
| 2017 | How to Talk to Girls at Parties | John Cameron Mitchell | Philippa Goslett, John Cameron Mitchell | |
| 2018 | Mary Magdalene | Garth Davis | Helen Edmundson, Philippa Goslett | |
| 2018 | Widows | Steve McQueen | Gillian Flynn, Steve McQueen | |
| 2019 | The Day Shall Come | Chris Morris | Chris Morris, Jesse Armstrong | |
| 2020 | Ammonite | Francis Lee | Francis Lee | |
| 2021 | The Power of the Dog | Jane Campion | Jane Campion | BAFTA Award for Best Film Critics' Choice Award for Best Picture AACTA International Award for Best Film Golden Globe Award for Best Motion Picture – Drama Nominated - Academy Award for Best Picture Nominated - PGA Award for Outstanding Producer of Theatrical Motion Pictures |
| 2022 | Operation Mincemeat | John Madden | Michelle Ashford | |
| 2022 | The Stranger | Thomas M. Wright | Thomas M. Wright | Premiered in Un Certain Regard at the 75th Cannes Film Festival |
| 2022 | The Son | Florian Zeller | Florian Zeller, Christopher Hampton | |
| 2026 | Tenzing | Jennifer Peedom | Luke Davies | Post-production |

=== Television ===
| Year | TV Series | Writer | Director | Notes |
|---|---|---|---|---|
| 2013 | Top of the Lake | Jane Campion, Gerard Lee | Jane Campion, Garth Davis | AACTA Award for Best Telefeature or Miniseries New Zealand Film and TV Awards for Best Television Feature or Drama Nominated – Emmy for Outstanding Miniseries or Movie Nominated – PGA Award for Outstanding Producer of Long-Form Television |
| 2015 | Banished | Jimmy McGovern, Shaun Duggan | Daniel Percival, Jeffrey Walker | Nominated – AACTA Award for Best Telefeature or Miniseries |
| 2016 | Codes of Conduct | Matthew Michael Carnahan | Steve McQueen | |
| 2016 | Love, Nina | Nick Hornby, Nina Stibbe | SJ Clarkson | |
| 2017 | Top of the Lake: China Girl | Jane Campion, Gerard Lee | Jane Campion, Ariel Kleiman | Nominated – Golden Globe Award for Best Television Limited Series or Motion Picture Made for Television |
| 2018 | The New Legends of Monkey | Jacquelin Perske | Gerard Johnstone | Nominated - AACTA Award for Best Children's Television Series |
| 2019 | State of the Union | Nick Hornby | Stephen Frears | International Emmy Award for Short Form Series |
| 2020 | The End | Samantha Strauss | Jessica M. Thompson, Jonathan Brough | Nominated - AACTA Award for Best Miniseries or Telefeature |
| 2021 | The North Water | Andrew Haigh | Andrew Haigh | |
| 2021 | Firebite | Warwick Thornton, Brendan Fletcher | Warwick Thornton, Brendan Fletcher, Tony Krawitz | |
| 2022 | Slow Horses | Will Smith, Morwenna Banks, Mark Denton, Jonny Stockwood | James Hawes | |
| 2022 | Heartstopper | Alice Oseman | Euros Lyn | |
| 2022 | The Essex Serpent | Anna Symon | Clio Barnard | |

=== Music videos ===
| Year | Music video | Director | Notes |
|---|---|---|---|
| 2009 | Linear | Anton Corbijn | |
| 2013 | Arcade Fire: Reflektor | Anton Corbijn | |
| 2016 | All Day/I Feel Like That | Steve McQueen | |
