= Larry Buttrose =

Australian writer

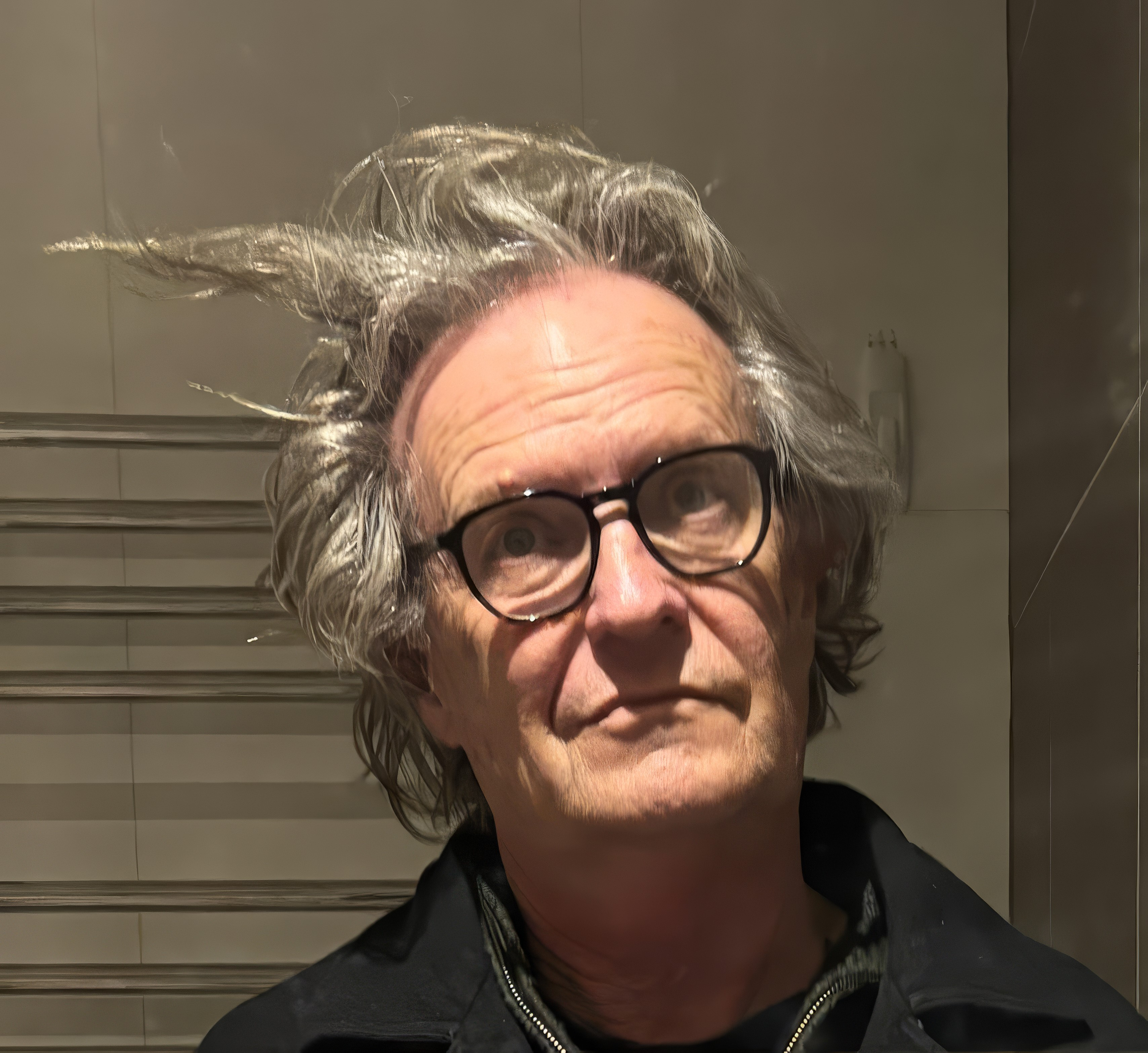
- Larry Buttrose, Selfie in Redfern September 2025
- Citizenship: Australian
- Occupations: Australian Writer and Journalist
- Writing career
- Language: English

Larry Philip Buttrose (born 16 December 1952) is an Australian writer, journalist and academic. He is the ghostwriter of the Saroo Brierley memoir A Long Way Home (adapted for the screen as the major international feature film Lion).

== Personal life ==
Buttrose was born in Adelaide, South Australia. At the age of 17 he co-founded the poetry magazine Dharma (later titled Real Poetry) with his then partner Donna Maegraith and friend Stephen Measday. While at university he trained as a journalist with the Australian Broadcasting Commission, and after graduating he worked as a freelance journalist. He gained his PhD from the University of Adelaide in 2011. He has two children, and lives in Sydney.

== Career ==
Buttrose published his first collection of poems, One Steps Across The Rainbow in 1974, at the age of 21. His first major collection, The Leichhardt Heater Journey (1982), was the first title in the long-running Friendly Street Poets series. He also co-edited the Number 3 Friendly Street anthology with Peter Goldsworthy. Angus & Robertson published Buttrose's first book of travel writing, The King Neptune Day & Night Club in 1992, and the critically acclaimed best-seller Cafe Royale (later retitled The Blue Man) followed in 1997. In 2004, he collaborated on the memoir by Michael Hutchence's brother Rhett, Total Xcess, and other books followed, including Tales of the Popes (2009) and the satirical graphic novel Finding the Shelf Within (2009).

He has also written extensively for the stage, his produced works including Pallas (1987), Kurtz (1991), the co-written musical Hot Shoe Shuffle (1992) and Complaints (1996). The ABC has produced two plays for radio, Santo (1986) and Complaints (1993).

He has contributed journalism to Roadrunner (Australian music magazine) and Rolling Stone, and opinion to various newspapers.

His best known book is A Long Way Home, the Saroo Brierley memoir, which he ghost-wrote in 2012. He researched and wrote the book between September and December of that year, including research trips to Hobart to interview Saroo and his family, and a month-long journey to India with Saroo. There he met Saroo's Indian family, and travelled with Saroo on a rail journey across India, retracing for the first time the journey that Saroo took two and a half decades before as a young child, that ended him in Calcutta (now Kolkata). Buttrose completed the book in his Kolkata hotel room.

He has also taught writing and media at various Australian universities. He holds a PhD in creative writing from Adelaide University (2011).

== Cabaret and comedy ==
In 1982 Buttrose joined Len Lindon's innovative comedy cabaret group Quietly Confident. The group moved to Sydney later that year, establishing itself in Surry Hills. They performed at many of the city's leading venues, including Kinselas, the Tivoli, Stranded and Art Unit. They released a single, Republic of Australia, and in 1983 performed a self-devised play, Scenario X, about the sacking of the Whitlam government, at the Nimrod Theatre. The group broke up that year, but in late 1983 Buttrose co-founded The Gap cabaret venue at the Sydney Trade Union Club with his then partner comedian Mandy Salomon, and their business partner, Judy Barnsley.

The Gap ran from 1983 to 1987, and helped launch the careers of a host of performers, including Salomon herself (with whom Buttrose collaborated in a creative partnership), Gretel Killeen and Julie McCrossin. Buttrose, Salomon and Barnsley also co-produced the Characters! series at The Gap and at the Sydney Theatre Company's Wharf Theatre, showcasing Australia's new generation of women comics, including Wendy Harmer, Mary-Anne Fahey, Gretel Killeen, Sue Ingleton, Angela Moore, Melanie Salomon, Victoria Roberts and Penny Biggins, poet Pam Brown, Sarah Miller (Told by an Idiot) and hosted by Mandy Salomon.

In 1986 Buttrose was approached by Mark Morgan of the Harold Park Hotel to start a weekly comedy night, called Comics in the Park. It quickly gained a following from audiences, and a number of Australia's leading comedians did their first performances there, including Bob Downe (whom Buttrose later managed), Flacco, Jimeoin, Kitty Flanagan, and the Umbilical Brothers. Others who performed there included Robin Williams, Vince Sorrenti, Austen Tayshus, George Smilovici, Steve Abbott, and Funny Stories.

== Other interests ==
Buttrose plays squash and badminton, and in 2006 co-founded The Carringtonians, a long-running weekly drinks get-together for Blue Mountains writers and others, at the historic Carrington Hotel in Katoomba.

== Books ==
=== Novels ===
- The Maze of the Muse (1998)
- Sweet Sentence (2001)

=== Humour and graphic novel ===
- Finding The Shelf Within (2009)

=== Short story collection ===
- Everyone on Mars (2024)

=== Travel ===
- The King Neptune Day & Night Club (1992)
- Cafe Royale (1997)/The Blue Man (1999)

=== Poetry ===
- One Steps Across The Rainbow (1974)
- Random Leaves (1978)
- The King Neptune Day & Night Club (1982)
- Learning Italian (1986)

=== Non-fiction ===
- Total Xcess (editor/collaborator, 2004)
- People Who Changed the Modern World (2005)
- Powerful & Influential People (2006)
- Dead Famous: Deaths of the Famous and Famous Deaths (2007)
- Tales of the Popes (2009)
- Speeches of War and Peace (2009, Concise edition 2010)

== Theatre ==
- Scenario X (co-creator, 1983)
- 111 Foveaux (co-creator/director 1983)
- Opera Opera! (co-creator/director 1985)
- Rubble (co-creator/director 1987)
- Pallas (1987)
- Kurtz (1991)
- Hot Shoe Shuffle (co-written with Kathryn Riding, 1992)
- Complaints (1996)

== Radio plays ==
- Santo (1986)
- Complaints (1993)

== Film ==
- Ozymandias (music film clip, director/producer/narrator, 1986)
- Movietone Memories (1988)
- Gino (feature co-written with Vince Sorrenti, 1993)

== Sources ==
- Ozymandias poetry-music film clip https://www.youtube.com/watch?v=jIfNpityBTQ
- Interview with Judyth Piazza, SOP radio networks US http://thesop.org/story/art/2009/12/28/judyth-piazza-chats-with-larry-buttrose-author-of-tales-of-the-popes.php
- "Interview with ABC's Carol Duncan on Paul Keating's famous Redfern Speech". abc.net.au. August 2010. Archived from the original on 24 April 2012.
- Book extract from The Blue Man published in The Independent https://www.independent.co.uk/arts-entertainment/travel-songs-of-bitter-experience-1093712.html
- Ockham's Razor on Science and Religion http://www.abc.net.au/rn/ockhamsrazor/stories/2009/2675731.htm
- Ockham's Razor, critique of Postmodern Theory http://www.abc.net.au/rn/ockhamsrazor/stories/2006/1785351.htm
- "Opinion piece in The Australian on the international crisis of capitalism". The Australian.
- "Reflections upon surviving a brutal Catholic education". The Sydney Morning Herald.
- Griffith Review – Profile on Larry Buttrose http://www.griffithreview.com/contributors/larry-buttrose
- Larry Buttrose – Personal blog https://larrybuttrose.blogspot.com/
- Guide to the Papers of Larry Buttrose at The University of New South Wales – http://lib.unsw.adfa.edu.au/speccoll/finding_aids/buttrose_larry.html
