= Lost Property Office =

- Directed by: Daniel Agdag
- Written by: Daniel Agdag
- Produced by: Liz Kearney
- Release date: 2017
- Running time: 9 minutes 45 seconds
- Country: Australia

Lost Property Office is a 2017 stop-motion animated short film written and directed by Daniel Agdag and produced by Liz Kearney. The film about a lost property office in a train station premiered at the 56th Melbourne International Film Festival.

== Awards ==
Year	Presenter/Festival	Award/Category	Status
2017	Melbourne International Film Festival	Best Animated Short Film	Nominated
2017	Sydney Film Festival	Yoram Gross Animation Award	Won
2017	Sydney Film Festival	Rouben Mamoulian Award for Best Director	Won
2017	AFI / AACTA	Best Short Animated Film	Won
