= Top of the Lake =

Australian television series

- Genre: Drama
- Created by: Jane Campion; Gerard Lee
- Written by: Jane Campion; Gerard Lee
- Directed by: Jane Campion; Garth Davis; Ariel Kleiman
- Starring: Elisabeth Moss; David Wenham; Peter Mullan; Thomas M. Wright; Holly Hunter; Gwendoline Christie; David Dencik; Ewen Leslie; Alice Englert; Nicole Kidman
- Theme music composer: Mark Bradshaw; Veljo Tormis
- Composer: Mark Bradshaw
- Countries of origin: Australia; United Kingdom; New Zealand
- Original language: English
- No. of series: 2
- No. of episodes: 13 (Sundance); 12 (BBC)

Production
- Executive producers: Emile Sherman; Iain Canning; Jane Campion; Jamie Laurenson
- Producers: Philippa Campbell; Libby Sharpe
- Production locations: Queenstown, New Zealand; Sydney
- Cinematography: Adam Arkapaw; Germain McMicking
- Editors: Alexandre de Franceschi; Scott Gray
- Camera setup: Single-camera
- Running time: 45 minutes (Sundance); 60 minutes (BBC)
- Production company: See-Saw Films

Original release
- Network: BBC UKTV (Australia and New Zealand); BBC Two (United Kingdom)
- Release: 18 March 2013 – 31 August 2017

Top of the Lake is a mystery drama television series created and written by Jane Campion and Gerard Lee, and directed by Campion and Garth Davis. It was broadcast in 2013, and the sequel, entitled Top of the Lake: China Girl, in 2017. It is Campion's first work for television since An Angel at My Table in 1990.

Series 1 follows Detective Robin Griffin (Elisabeth Moss) and deals with her investigation of the disappearance of a pregnant 12-year-old girl in New Zealand. Series 2, China Girl, is set in Sydney five years later, as Detective Griffin investigates the death of an unidentified Asian girl found at Bondi Beach.

Top of the Lake was co-produced for BBC Two in the UK, BBC UKTV in Australia and New Zealand, and Sundance Channel in the United States. It has been generally very well received.

== Cast ==
Elisabeth Moss plays the central role of Robin Griffin, a Sydney detective specializing in sexual assault, in both series. Additional cast members are as follows:

=== Top of the Lake ===
==== Main ====
- David Wenham as Al Parker, an old-school and well-liked detective sergeant, based in Queenstown, who also manages a café where young offenders are given a second chance.
- Peter Mullan as Matt Mitcham, a Scotsman and head of the Mitcham family. He is the informal leader of the town, feared by the townspeople, but with a complex inner life.
- Tom Wright as Johnno Mitcham, Matt's estranged youngest son, and Robin's teenage sweetheart. He recently returned to Laketop after serving eight years in Bangkwang, a Thai prison, for drug possession.
- Holly Hunter as GJ, an androgynous Swiss spiritual leader, arriving at Paradise with a group of troubled women, who hope GJ and Laketop will help them rediscover themselves.

==== Supporting ====
- Kip Chapman and Jay Ryan as Luke and Mark Mitcham, Matt's brute sons.
- Jacqueline Joe as Tui Angel Mitcham, Matt's 12-year-old daughter who disappears after it is discovered that she is five months pregnant.
- Robyn Nevin as Jude Griffin, Robin's mother, who is suffering from cancer.
- Calvin Tuteao as Turangi, Jude's Māori boyfriend, who has a violent temper.

GJ's community
- Alison Bruce as Anne-Marie
- Georgi Kay as Melissa
- Lucy Lawless as Caroline Platt
- Genevieve Lemon as Bunny
- Robyn Malcolm as Anita
- Griz Pomirska as "the Naked Lady"
- Sarah Valentine as Prue
- Skye Wansey as Grishina
Matt's men
- Ben Barrington as Terry
- James Blake as Shotover
- Byron Coll as Penguin
- Cohen Holloway as Mike
- Oscar Redding as Sarge
- Edwin Wright as Scuzz
Tui's friends
- Luke Buchanan as Jamie
- Sam Dickson as Jase
- Connor Olivia Moore as Kayla
- Layne Opetaia as Daniel
- Alice Ward as Gemma
- Sydney Telfer as Teegan
The Southern Lakes Police Department
- Stephen Lovatt as Officer Pete
- Gavin Rutherford as Officer Joy
- Madeleine Sami as Zena the secretary
Residents of Laketop
- Edward Campbell as Putty, the "village idiot".
- Lauren Dawes as Mandy, Johnno's girlfriend.
- Erica Englert as Narelle, Matt's housekeeper.
- Mirrah Foulkes as Simone, Jamie's mother.
- Dra McKay as Delia, Tui's teacher.

=== Top of the Lake: China Girl ===
==== Main ====
- Gwendoline Christie as Miranda Hilmarson, a 35-year-old constable in the Sydney Police Force, who becomes Robin's partner.
- David Dencik as Alexander "Puss" Braun, a 42-year-old charismatic German, who owns a building in Sydney he rents to a brothel. He is also Mary's boyfriend. Puss's grooming of Mary is a major concern for her adoptive parents and Robin.
- Ewen Leslie as Pyke Edwards, Mary's adoptive father. A thoughtful and caring father, he at times appears a pushover in his relationship with Julia.
- Alice Englert as Mary Edwards, Robin's 17-year-old daughter, whom Robin gave up for adoption right after giving birth to her. Mary is in thrall of her manipulative boyfriend and resentful of her parents' separation.
- Nicole Kidman as Julia Edwards, Mary's overbearing adoptive mother. She has recently become estranged from her husband and daughter after having an affair with a female teacher from Mary's school, with whom she now lives.

==== Supporting ====
- Clayton Jacobson as Detective Sergeant Adrian Butler, Robin's boss.
- Kym Gyngell as Bootie, who owns the Silk 41 brothel in Sydney, in space rented from Puss.
- Ling Cooper Tang as Dang, Bootie's Thai-born wife and madam of the brothel.
- Geoff Morrell as Ray, the police pathologist.
- Liv Hewson as Michaela, Mary's best friend at school.
- Christiaan Van Vuuren as Stally, a police constable interested in Robin.
- Lincoln Vickery, as Brett Iles, a young computer science student in love with a missing brothel worker, Cinnamon.

David Wenham returns as Al in one episode. Kip Chapman, Jacqueline Joe, Byron Coll and Cohen Holloway also reprise their Top of the Lake roles in a flashback sequence, with Mark Leonard Winter appearing as Johnno.

== Production ==
=== Top of the Lake ===
Jane Campion originally offered the role of Robin to Anna Paquin, who had worked with her on The Piano (1993), but she declined due to her pregnancy. The role then went to American Elisabeth Moss.

The series was originally intended as a co-production with the Australian Broadcasting Corporation. But after Moss was cast as Robin, the network pulled their funding before production began, citing a prior agreement to put an Australian actress in the lead. Australian-based channel UKTV, owned by BBC Worldwide, filled the funding gap left by the ABC. Philippa Campbell was the New Zealand-based producer.

Filming took 18 weeks and was shot entirely on location in Queenstown and Glenorchy, in Otago, on the South Island of New Zealand. While Queenstown is referred to during the series, Glenorchy doubles as the fictitious town of Laketop. The scenes in the women's commune were filmed at Moke Lake.

=== Top of the Lake: China Girl ===
In early 2013, co-creator Jane Campion said that Top of the Lake comes to a distinct ending, and there would be no additional series. Despite this, it was announced in October 2014 that the series had been renewed for a second season. China Girl began shooting on location in Sydney in December 2015.

Campion returned as co-writer and co-director. Gerard Lee returned as co-writer. The original co-director, Garth Davis, was replaced by Ariel Kleiman due to scheduling conflicts. Philippa Campbell returned as producer. Actress Nicole Kidman joined the cast for China Girl, which is the second time she has worked with Campion. Kidman "plays an Australian mother, Julia, whose story dovetails with that of Detective Robin Griffin", played by Elisabeth Moss. Gwendoline Christie, a fan of Campion's The Piano, joined the cast in a role written especially for her after sending a letter through a mutual friend.

== Release ==
Top of the Lake was screened in its entirety at the January 2013 Sundance Film Festival, in a single seven-hour session with one intermission and a break for lunch. This was the first such screening in the history of the festival. Top of the Lake was additionally shown at the 63rd Berlin International Film Festival.

The US premiere was on the Sundance Channel on 18 March 2013, in Australia on BBC UKTV on 24 March 2013, and in New Zealand on 25 March, also on BBC UKTV.

China Girl was screened in its entirety at the May 2017 Cannes Film Festival. In the UK, it premiered on BBC Two on 27 July 2017. In the US, it premiered in September 2017, on Sundance TV, and each episode was made available on Hulu the day after its screening on SundanceTV. In Canada, China Girl premiered on 25 October 2017, on CBC Television.

== Episodes ==
Series	Episodes	Originally Aired	
Series	Episodes	First Aired	Last Aired
1	7 (Sundance) 6 (BBC)	18 March 2013	15 April 2013
2	6	27 July 2017	31 August 2017

=== Series 1 ===
Sundance episodes
No. overall	No. in season	Title	Directed by	Written by	Original release date
1	1	"Episode 1"	Jane Campion	Jane Campion & Gerard Lee	18 March 2013
In the small town of Laketop, New Zealand, a 12-year-old girl named Tui Mitcham is discovered standing chest-deep in the icy, glacial waters of the titular lake. She is found to be almost 5 months pregnant. Robin Griffin, who grew up in the area, is now a police inspector in Sydney who specializes in cases involving children. While home visiting her sick mother, Robin expresses her disapproval of her mother's boyfriend, who has an explosive temper, but her mother defends him. Robin agrees to interview Tui at the local police station, and asks Tui who impregnated her. She writes NO ONE. Tui goes home where she lives with her father, Matt Mitcham, and her two thuggish brothers. Tui silently points a gun at Matt but he is unfazed and tells her to get a bigger gun. Tui's estranged mother is horrified by her daughter's pregnancy, but Matt seems merely annoyed. Outraged that he has brokered a deal to sell land to an unorthodox women's therapy group in majestic Paradise Valley, the Mitcham family's old homestead, Matt and his sons murder the local real estate agent by dragging him behind their boat, faking his drowning. Packed with a rifle and supplies, Tui rides her horse to visit the women in Paradise and their mysterious leader, GJ.
2	2	"Episode 2"	Garth Davis with Jane Campion	Jane Campion & Gerard Lee	18 March 2013
Robin and her old boyfriend Johnno Mitcham find the body of the real estate agent. Robin reminds Johnno that her father also died in this lake. Robin goes to keep an appointment with Tui but finds only Matt at home. He has the estate agent's dog and shoots it in front of Robin. He tells Robin that no one loves Tui more than he. Tui's horse is found far from home. Two women from Paradise tell Robin that Tui was with them the day before but was gone in the morning. One of the women has a strange sexual encounter at a pub. Robin walks into the lake and has a vision of Tui doing the same, clenching her fists in the water. GJ dismisses a resident's rich, entitled husband and adds her daughter to the group. Robin meets with her colleagues and discusses suspects in Tui's rape and disappearance: her family members and a local registered sex offender. Although she is lost in a vast wilderness, some of the cops shrug off the need to even bother to search for the child with racist and sexist remarks. Only affable Detective Al Parker shows any real interest in Tui's fate or respect for Robin, later taking her for a helicopter search. A community ground search ends that day at a pub. Matt scornfully tells the crowd that if any of them are abusing his daughter, they will pay. Later the drunken male patrons make lewd jokes and heap abuse on the missing girl. An interview at the sex offender's house nearly ends in disaster.
3	3	"Episode 3"	Garth Davis	Jane Campion & Gerard Lee	25 March 2013
Matt Mitcham goes to Paradise and sits in on a session with GJ, the enigmatic leader of the camp. In a mocking tone, Matt asks the group about the human mind. GJ tells Matt that the human mind schemes. Later, Al meets Matt in the middle of the lake for a secret meeting.
4	4	"Episode 4"	Garth Davis with Jane Campion	Jane Campion & Gerard Lee	1 April 2013
Robin has dinner at Al's ultramodern, immaculate, lakeside house. Robin tells Al she thinks Tui's note, that said "No One", meant there were multiple rapists. Al counsels Robin she is getting too involved in Tui's case, likely because of Robin's own history of having been gang raped, at age 15. She gets drunk after learning that the whole police force knows that she was raped and he himself worked the case and roughed the guys up with assistance from Matt Mitcham.
5	5	"Episode 5"	Jane Campion with Garth Davis	Jane Campion & Gerard Lee	8 April 2013
Robin asks Johnno what he wanted to tell her about the night she was raped. Johnno describes how he got in the dog kennel in the back of the truck after he saw Robin get in the truck. While he had heard her screams, he found himself being unable to do anything due to being berated and abused by some of the rapists. Johnno gave up and cried after realizing his helplessness. Robin responds saying he was just a kid, and there was nothing he could have done. Johnno leaves soon after to bully Sarge into leaving town.
6	6	"Episode 6"	Garth Davis with Jane Campion	Jane Campion & Gerard Lee	15 April 2013
Robin reveals to Johnno that she plans to make a case against Matt Mitcham, in hopes of encouraging Tui to come home. Johnno tells her people won't stand her threatening with the towns livelihood. Robin shares that she caught Jamie with Rohypnol, a "date rape" drug that Robin suspects Matt manufactures. Robin tells Jamie's mom and her coworkers that she wants to help their kids and they tell her not to take on Matt. Johnno warns Robin against bringing a case against Matt, as Matt's drug business provides much of the town with a livelihood. Robin tries to have Matt and his fellow hunters DNA tested and Matt refuses for all of them saying he's going to find his daughter. Tui and Jamie go to Paradise to ask GJ how Tui can give birth. Then they flee at her brother’s unexpected arrival. Tui's friends come visit her as well as Putty who says he's a midwife and so was his family and he brought a birthing book for Tui. Hunters encroach upon their campsite.
7	7	"Episode 7"	Jane Campion	Jane Campion & Gerard Lee	15 April 2013
Robin goes to work at the police station the next day and tells Al that Matt said he was her father. Matt, certain that Tui could not be pregnant, searches for and finds her with her newborn baby. As he is about to kill the baby, Tui appears and kills Matt. Robin discovers that Al has been pimping young boys and girls from the barista training, including Tui, to other men for sex.

BBC episodes
No. overall	No. in season	Title	Directed by	Written by	UK air date	UK viewers (millions)
1	1	"Paradise Sold"	Jane Campion	Jane Campion & Gerard Lee	13 July 2013	2.70
Tui's pregnancy is discovered, and the Paradise community moves in.
2	2	"Searchers Search"	Garth Davis	Jane Campion & Gerard Lee	20 July 2013	1.92
Robin's search for Tui begins.
3	3	"The Edge of the Universe"	Garth Davis	Jane Campion & Gerard Lee	27 July 2013	1.57
Robin makes a breakthrough. Over dinner at Al's place he warns her about her past being known.
4	4	"A Rainbow Above Us"	Jane Campion	Jane Campion & Gerard Lee	3 August 2013	1.32
Al dismisses Robin from the case. Her passionate affair with Johnno intensifies.
5	5	"The Dark Creator"	Garth Davis	Jane Campion & Gerard Lee	10 August 2013	1.50
Robin is back on the case. Matt gathers troops to hunt Tui down. Tui's friends celebrate her birthday in the mountains.
6	6	"No Goodbyes, Thanks"	Jane Campion	Jane Campion & Gerard Lee	17 August 2013	1.72
Matt reveals his secret about Robin, and the investigation concludes.

=== Series 2: China Girl ===
No. overall	No. in season	Title	Directed by	Written by	UK air date	UK viewers (millions)
7	1	"China Girl"	Jane Campion	Jane Campion & Gerard Lee	27 July 2017	3.39
In Sydney, brothel owners Bootie and Dang throw a heavy suitcase off a cliff into the ocean. Four years after the events with Tui, Robin tries to adjust back to life in Sydney while dealing with residual PTSD from shooting Al Parker. Parker turned witness in the case of the pedophile ring in exchange for immunity and has now filed a civil suit against Robin, claiming the shooting was personally motivated. Robin's daughter, Mary, is now nearly 18 and exhibiting signs of emotional problems, which deeply worries her adoptive parents. As they later learn, Mary's boyfriend, Alexander, or "Puss", is 25 years her senior, and he rents his house to a brothel, named "Silk 41". Mary believes she is in love with Puss, admiring him for "empowering" young South Asian immigrant women by teaching them English. Mary is openly hostile towards her adoptive parents, Pyke and Julia, who are getting a divorce after Julia came out as a lesbian. When they first meet Puss, he announces his intention to marry Mary. Brett, a socially awkward university student, who frequents brothels, worries about one of the young women working at the brothel, Cinnamon, whom he images to be his girlfriend. Robin's new boss, Detective Sergeant Adrian Butler, brings a large stuffed panda to another young woman at the brothel. Meanwhile, the suitcase containing the decomposing body of a woman washes up on Bondi Beach. Robin, along with a rookie constable, Miranda, is assigned to the case.
8	2	"The Loved One"	Ariel Kleiman	Jane Campion & Gerard Lee	3 August 2017	2.38
A flashback reveals that, four weeks earlier, on the day of her wedding with Johnno, Robin broke up with him after finding him in jail in a company of another woman, having been arrested for growing pot. In the present, Robin, who had suffered miscarriages with Johnno, has nightmares about babies. Instructed by Adrian to mentor Miranda, Robin continues investigating the identify of the murdered woman, believed to be a sex worker and dubbed "China Girl", despite the growing tension between Robin and Miranda. The autopsy of the China Girl reveals that she was about 17 weeks pregnant, which visibly upsets Miranda, who admits that she, too, is pregnant. The non-matching DNA result of the fetus suggests that the China Girl was most likely a surrogate mother. When searching brothels, which are legal in Sydney, Robin notices a large stuffed panda at Silk 41. When she asks her boss what happened to the panda in his office, he claims he gave it to his son. Brett goes to Silk 41 searching for Cinnamon, where he is told that she left for Canberra, which he refuses to believe. Robin finally works up the courage to contact Mary. When she meets with Pyke and Julia, Julia angrily informs her that Mary's behavioral problems began when she didn't receive any reply to her letter to Robin. After Julia storms off, Robin shares with Pyke that she was only 16 when Mary was born. When Robin and Mary eventually meet, Robin confirms Mary's suspicion that she was the product of rape.
9	3	"Surrogate"	Ariel Kleiman	Jane Campion & Gerard Lee	10 August 2017	1.97
Robin learns that the China Girl was acting as an illegal surrogate. She and Miranda visit a fertility clinic, where the doctor tells Robin that illegal surrogacy is too high of a risk because the law would side with the surrogate mother should she wish to keep the child. Robin then sees Miranda arguing with the receptionist. Forced to attend the mediation with Al, who uses a wheelchair, Robin is left fighting for her life when he tries to kill her before the mediation begins. When a delirious woman is found crying about her missing child, Robin gets a lead into the biological parents, Felicity and Mike, of the surrogated baby. She visits the couple and collects Mike's DNA test. Miranda, who is having an affair with the married Adrian, frustrates Robin with her smoking and drinking. Robin's colleague, Stally, makes unwanted advances on her. Learning that Puss is already married, Pyke and Julia confront him in a restaurant, causing him to have a bizarre outburst, which deepens the rift between Mary and her parents. Pouting, Puss locks himself in his apartment and refuses to see anyone, including Mary. Pyke calls Robin, asking for help. Back at Robin's place, Mary falls asleep in Robin's arms.
10	4	"Birthday"	Ariel Kleiman	Jane Campion & Gerard Lee	17 August 2017	1.92
On their way to the school's Daddy/Daughter dance evening, Mary stops to check on Puss, who insists on coming along. At the dance, he interrupts Pyke and Mary's waltz, tries to sexually dance with Mary, and gets kicked out. Brett, who has been following the news, contacts the police and tells them that the woman found in the suitcase might be Cinnamon, who worked at Silk 41. He also describes the creepy guy at the brothel, whom Robin recognizes as Mary's boyfriend, Puss. Pyke, Robin, and Mary make a plan to go to the beach with several girls from the brothel, introduced by Mary as students, to teach them how to swim. Along with Mary also comes Puss. Noticing Robin's air of hostility towards him, he brings up her rape, makes sexually suggestive remarks, and then violently attacks her, biting her on the nose. Mary, panicking, begs Robin not to press charges. The DNA test reveals that Felicity and Mike are not the biological parents. They, however, have hired three other young women as their surrogate mothers. Mocking her privileged upbringing, Puss gradually pressures Mary to start working at the brothel and takes her to a hookers' strip on her 18th birthday. When Mary admits being afraid, he hits her in the face to demonstrate, as he says, the minimal level of pain she should expect from any John. Thrown out of a client's car, Mary, in tears, phones Robin for help. When sitting in Robin's car, Mary finds Cinnamon's photo, whom she recognizes. Robin hints that Mary is in great danger. At Robin's apartment, Mary breaks down crying, saying she doesn't know how to leave Puss.
11	5	"Who's Your Daddy"	Jane Campion	Jane Campion & Gerard Lee	24 August 2017	1.69
Mary leaves the safety of Robin's home to reconnect with Puss, who learns from her that Robin is looking into Cinnamon's murder. Robin tells Pyke about picking Mary up from the hookers' strip, angering Pyke. When asked to identify Cinnamon's body, Brett becomes further unhinged and begins hallucinating about Cinnamon. Miranda says she fears that her baby is dead. Back at the fertility clinic, Miranda, visibly agitated, shows the receptionist Cinnamon's photo and demands to know where Cinnamon is. Robin takes Miranda out to the beach, where Miranda reveals that she is not actually pregnant and that she, too, has a surrogate mother who has gone missing. The fertility doctor connects Robin with another couple, who identify Cinnamon as their surrogate mother. With the help of Mary's friend Michaela, Puss directs an amateurish "short film", set in a Thai village, featuring the women from the brothel and several babies. Mary feels worried when another pregnant girl from Silk 41 is taken away by Puss. Connected by their concern over Mary, Robin and Pyke grow closer, frustrating Julia. Brett, armed with a rifle, shows up at the brothel and demands to see Puss. To escape in the elevator, Puss pushes Mary in front of the gunman when Brett fires the rifle.
12	6	"The Battle of the Mothers"	Ariel Kleiman	Jane Campion & Gerard Lee	31 August 2017	1.84
Robin and Pyke make love when she receives a late-night call from Mary, only to hear a gun shot and screams. She learns from Miranda about the shooting at Silk 41 and the gunman's taking Mary hostage. The security footage from the brothel shows Puss escaping as Brett shoots Bootie, before leaving with Mary. Another footage shows a room with the surrogate mothers. When Pyke and Julia appeal to Mary's classmates for information, Michaela tells them about Stasi Cafe, where Mary first met Puss. The manhunt for Brett sends Robin and Miranda to Bondi Beach, where they notice an empty box on the sand. When Miranda kicks it away, they see Brett's face peeking out. As Miranda rushes to check his pulse, Brett pulls the rifle out of the sand and shoots her in the abdomen. Meanwhile, Mary shows up at home, unharmed. Crying, Julia begs her to stay, but Mary leaves. At the hospital, standing by Miranda's bedside as she lies in a coma, Robin promises Adrian to find their surrogate. She goes to Stasi Cafe to meet Pyke, but he has to leave when Julia informs him that Mary left with her passport. Robin hears a noise and finds Puss in the kitchen. Threatening him with a gun, she gets him to tell her where the missing surrogates are hiding. He also claims that Cinnamon hanged herself. With Adrian and other expectant couples, Robin finds the place emptied and a DVD left behind. At the airport, as Mary and Puss, together with the surrogates, are boarding the plane, Mary accuses Puss of abandoning her during the shooting and refuses to board. At the apartment, Adrian and the couples learn from the DVD of Puss's short film that Puss absconded with the surrogates. The hysterical couples beg Adrian to stop them, but Adrian admits defeat. Robin goes to see Mary back at her adoptive parents' home, where Julia tells her that she and Pyke are getting back together. Robin asks if she could borrow the video of Mary as a child. Although Julia protests, Pyke gives her the video, adding that he would collect it after Robin has watched it. Robin says that she intends to watch it later that evening. Julia looks concerned but says nothing. Later that night, as Robin watches the video, crying happy tears, she hears a knock on her door.

== Reception ==
Reviews of the first series of Top of the Lake have been positive, referring to it as "masterfully made", "beautiful", "mysterious", "riveting", and "a masterpiece".

Rotten Tomatoes reported a 95% approval rating with an average rating of 8.9/10, based on 44 critic reviews. The website's critics consensus reads, "Absorbing and deeply atmospheric, Top of the Lake takes edgy, disturbing content and delivers powerful performances with lasting impressions." Metacritic assigned a score of 87 out of 100 based on 27 critics, indicating "universal acclaim".

There were also some less positive reviews. Mike Hale of The New York Times criticized the "elaborately introduced plotlines" and described Tui's disappearance as "less a story element than a metaphor for the kind of armed resistance to male hegemony that constitutes the central idea of Ms Campion’s body of work."

Top of the Lake was praised for exploring rape culture, gender dynamics and the experiences of single women.

China Girl received positive reviews, although it was considered inferior to the first series. Rotten Tomatoes reported a 72% approval rating with an average rating of 6.9/10, based on 61 critic reviews. The website's critics consensus reads, "Top of the Lake remains impressively idiosyncratic and ambitious in its second season, even if the plot of this six-episode arc isn't quite as tightly wound as its predecessor's." Metacritic assigned a score of 73 out of 100 based on 21 critics, indicating "generally favorable reviews".

=== Awards and nominations ===
==== AACTA Awards ====
Year	Category	Nominated artist/work	Result
2014	Best Telefeature, Mini-Series or Short Run Series	Emile Sherman, Iain Canning, Jane Campion, and Philippa Campbell	Won
2014	Best Direction in a Drama or Comedy	Garth Davis for "The Dark Creator"	Nominated
2014	Best Guest or Supporting Actor in a Television Drama	Peter Mullan	Nominated
2014	Best Guest or Supporting Actress in a Television Drama	Robyn Nevin	Nominated
2014	Best Cinematography in Television	Adam Arkapaw for Episode 5: "The Dark Creator"	Won
2014	Best Sound in Television	Richard Flynn, Tony Vaccher, John Dennison, Craig Butters, Danny Longhurst, and Blair Slater, for Episode 5: "The Dark Creator"	Won
2014	Best Original Music Score in Television	Mark Bradshaw, for Episode 5: "The Dark Creator"	Nominated
2014	Best Production Design in Television	Fiona Crombie for Episode 5: "The Dark Creator"	Nominated
2014	Best Costume Design in Television	Emily Seresin for Episode 5: "The Dark Creator"	Nominated
2014	Best Editing in Television	Scott Gray for Episode 5: "The Dark Creator"	Nominated

==== British Academy Television Craft Awards ====
Year	Category	Nominated artist/work	Result
2018	Best Director: Fiction	Jane Campion	Nominated

==== Critics' Choice Television Awards ====
Year	Category	Nominated artist/work	Result
2013	Best Movie/Miniseries	—	Nominated
2013	Best Actress in a Movie/Miniseries	Elisabeth Moss	Won
2013	Best Supporting Actor in a Movie/Miniseries	Peter Mullan	Nominated
2013	Best Supporting Actor in a Movie/Miniseries	David Wenham	Nominated
2013	Best Supporting Actor in a Movie/Miniseries	Thomas M. Wright	Nominated

==== Emmy Awards ====
Year	Category	Nominated artist/work	Result
2013	Primetime Emmy Awards		
2013	Outstanding Miniseries or Movie	Emile Sherman, Iain Canning, Jane Campion and Philippa Campbell	Nominated
2013	Outstanding Lead Actress in a Miniseries or Movie	Elisabeth Moss	Nominated
2013	Outstanding Supporting Actor in a Miniseries or Movie	Peter Mullan	Nominated
2013	Outstanding Directing for a Miniseries, Movie, or Dramatic Special	Jane Campion, Garth Davis	Nominated
2013	Outstanding Writing for a Miniseries, Movie, or Dramatic Special	Jane Campion and Gerard Lee	Nominated
2013	Creative Arts Emmy Awards		
2013	Outstanding Casting for a Miniseries, Movie, or Special	Kirsty McGregor and Tina Cleary	Nominated
2013	Outstanding Cinematography for a Miniseries or Movie	Adam Arkapaw (for "Part 1")	Won
2013	Outstanding Single-Camera Picture Editing for a Miniseries or Movie	Alexandre de Franceschi and Scott Gray (for "Part 5")	Nominated

==== Golden Globe Awards ====
Year	Category	Nominated artist/work	Result	Ref.
2014	Best Miniseries or Television Film	—	Nominated	
2014	Best Actress – Miniseries or Television Film	Elisabeth Moss	Won	

==== Golden Nymph Awards ====
Year	Category	Nominated artist/work	Result
2014	Best Miniseries	—	Won
2014	Best Actor – Miniseries	Peter Mullan	Won
2014	Best Actress – Miniseries	Elisabeth Moss	Won

==== Screen Actors Guild Awards ====
Year	Category	Nominated artist/work	Result
2014	Outstanding Performance by a Female Actor in a Miniseries or Television Movie	Elisabeth Moss	Nominated
2014	Outstanding Performance by a Female Actor in a Miniseries or Television Movie	Holly Hunter	Nominated

==== New Zealand Film Awards ====
Year	Category	Result	Ref
2013	Best Television Feature or Drama Series	Won	

==== Screen Producers Australia Awards ====
Year	Category	Result	Ref
2013	Drama Television Production of the Year	Won	

==== Equity Ensemble Awards ====
Year	Category	Result	Ref
2013	Outstanding Performance by an Ensemble in a Miniseries or Telemovie	Won	
