= Saroo Brierley =

Indian-born Australian writer

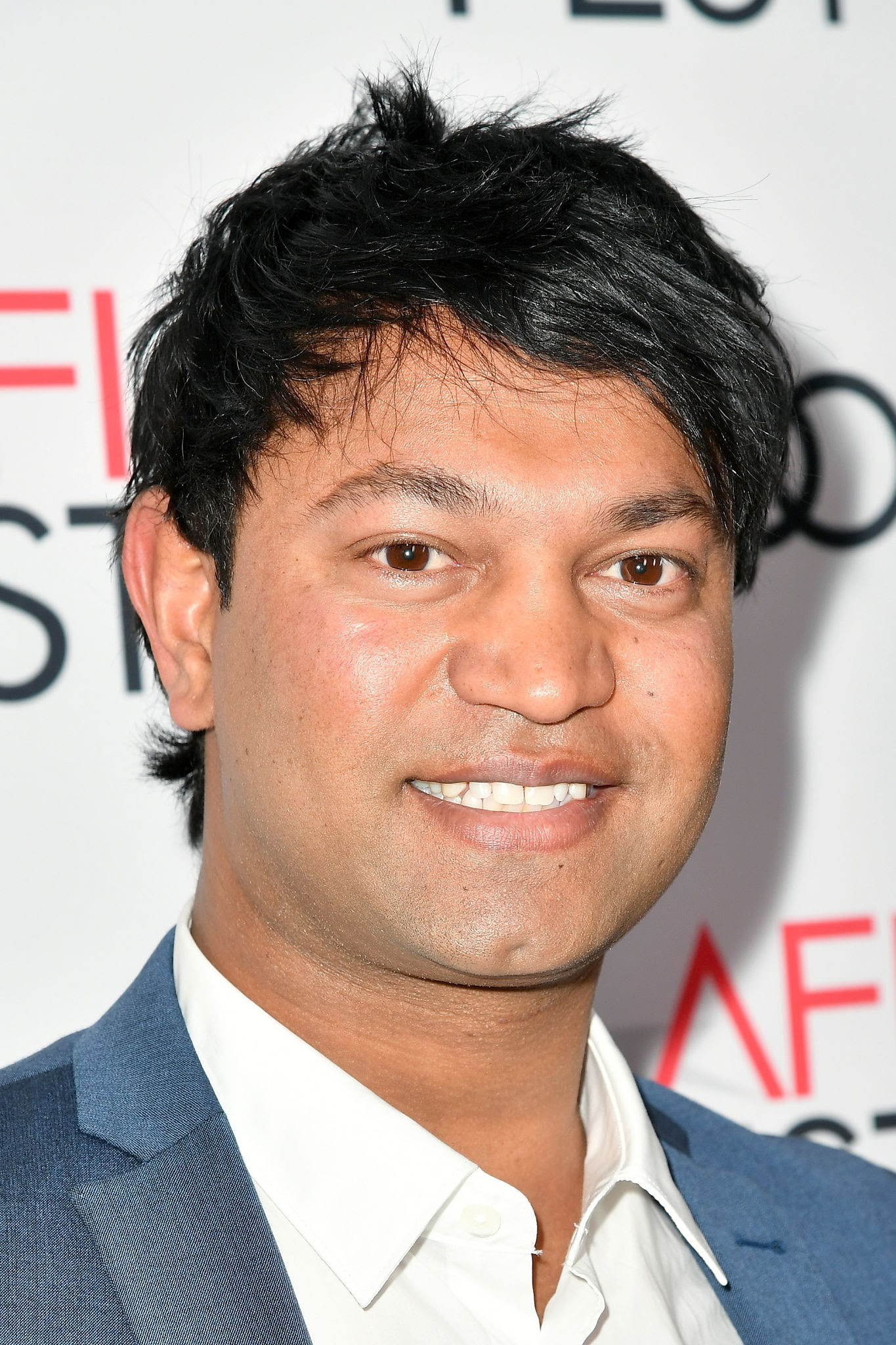
- Brierley in 2016
- Born: Sheru Munshi Khan c.1981 (age 44–45); Ganesh Talai, Madhya Pradesh, India
- Citizenship: Australian
- Occupations: Businessman and author
- Notable work: A Long Way Home
- Website: saroobrierley.com

Saroo Brierley (born Sheru Munshi Khan; c. 1981) is an Indian-born Australian businessman and author who, at age six, was accidentally separated from his biological family. Brierley was adopted out of India by an Australian couple but was reunited with his original family 25 years later after finding his hometown via Google Earth. His story generated significant international media attention especially in Australia and India.

An autobiographical account of his experiences, A Long Way Home, was published in 2013 in Australia, released internationally in 2014, and adapted into the 2016 Oscar-nominated film Lion, starring Sunny Pawar and Dev Patel as Saroo, David Wenham as his adoptive father, John Brierley, and Nicole Kidman as his adoptive mother, Sue Brierley.

== Background ==
Saroo Brierley was born Sheru Munshi Khan, in about 1981, in Ganesh Talai, a suburb within Khandwa, in the Indian state of Madhya Pradesh, into a Muslim family. His father worked as a building contractor. When Saroo was around three years old, his father abandoned the family after taking a second wife, throwing the family into poverty. His mother, who chose not to petition for a divorce although she legally could have done so, worked in construction to support herself and her children but often did not make enough money to feed them all, and could not afford to send them to school. Saroo and his elder brothers, Guddu and Kallu, began begging at the local railway station and market for food and money, and Saroo was sent by his mother with a bowl to ask neighbours for leftovers. Guddu sometimes obtained odd jobs such as washing dishes in a restaurant and sweeping the floors of train carriages. Saroo and his brothers also resorted to pilfering food from bales of rice and chickpeas at the local railway station as well as unwatched fruit trees and vegetable patches. At one point, Guddu was arrested for violating child labour laws after selling toothbrush and paste kits at the railway station platform, and despite the law being intended to protect children, was imprisoned for a few days.

One evening in or about 1986, Guddu said he was going to ride the train from Khandwa to the city of Burhanpur, 70 kilometres (43 mi) to the south, and reluctantly allowed the six-year-old Saroo to join him. By the time the train reached Burhanpur, Saroo was so tired he collapsed onto a seat on the platform. Guddu told his little brother to wait and promised to be back shortly. Guddu did not return, and Saroo eventually became impatient. (Unknown to Saroo, Guddu was killed after falling from a moving train). Saroo noticed a train parked in the station and, thinking his brother was on it, boarded an empty carriage. He found there were no doors to the adjoining carriages. Hoping his brother would come for him, he fell asleep. When he awoke, the train was travelling across an unfamiliar area. Occasionally the train stopped at small stations, but Saroo was unable to open the door to escape. Saroo's rail journey eventually ended at the huge Howrah railway station in Calcutta, West Bengal, and he fled when someone opened the door to his carriage. Saroo did not know it at the time, but he was nearly 1,500 kilometres (930 mi) from his hometown.

He attempted to return home, initially by boarding different trains, but these proved to be on suburban lines and each one eventually took Saroo back to Howrah railway station. For a week or two, he lived in and around the station. He survived by scavenging scraps of food in the street and sleeping underneath the station's seats. His need for food took him further out into the city; and, after days of homelessness on Calcutta's streets, he was found by a railway worker who took him in and gave him food and shelter. Saroo sensed that something was not right when the railway worker showed Saroo to a friend, who had Saroo lie down beside him, causing Saroo to become suspicious. (page 77) Saroo fled and was pursued by railway workers and the man, but he managed to escape- adult Saroo said "I was too young to know what the man might have done to me if he' caught me, but i knew it was a fate i wanted to avoid (page 79)

Saroo eventually met a teenager who took him to a police station and reported that he might be a lost child. The police took Saroo to a government centre for abandoned children. Weeks later, he was moved to the Indian Society for Sponsorship and Adoption. The staff there attempted to locate his family, but Saroo did not know enough for them to sufficiently trace his hometown, and he was officially declared a lost child. In 1987, he was adopted by the Brierley family of Hobart, Tasmania, Australia, and moved there in September 1987.

In the meantime, his mother, Kamla Munshi, searched for her two sons. A few weeks after her sons failed to return home, police informed her that Guddu's body had been found near the railway tracks, having been killed by an oncoming train a kilometre (0.6 mi) from Burhanpur station. She then confined her energy to looking for Saroo, travelling to different places on trains. She never gave up hope that Saroo was still alive and would return some day. Years later, she opted to stay in Ganesh Talai rather than moving in with Kallu's family in Burhanpur so that Saroo would be able to find her if he returned.

== Search for his family ==
Saroo grew up in Hobart in an Australian family. His Australian parents adopted another Indian boy, Mantosh, who became Saroo's brother. Saroo learned English and soon lost touch with Hindi. Saroo originated as a mispronunciation of his given name, Sheru.

He studied business and hospitality at the Australian International Hotel School in Canberra. As an adult, he spent over six years conducting searches using the satellite images on Google Earth, painstakingly following railway lines radiating out from Howrah railway station. He relied on his vague memories of the main features around Burhanpur railway station, remembering it as "Berampur", an unfortunately common place name throughout India (page 149). Late one night in 2011, he came upon a small railway station that closely matched his childhood recollection of where he had become trapped in an empty carriage; the name of this station was Burhanpur, very close to a phonetic spelling of the name he remembered from his childhood ordeal. He followed the satellite images of the railway line north and found the town of Khandwa. He had no recollection of that name, but the town contained recognizable features, such as a fountain near the train tracks where he used to play. He was able to trace a path through the streets to what appeared to be the place where he and his family used to live.

Following up on a lead, Saroo contacted a Facebook group based in Khandwa. The Facebook group reinforced his belief that Khandwa might be his hometown, and people in the group told him the name of the suburb on the map – Ganesh Talai.

In 2012, Saroo travelled to Khandwa in India and asked residents if they knew of any family that had lost their son 25 years prior. He showed photographs of himself as a child in Hobart. Local people soon led him to his mother. He was also reunited with his sister, Shekila, and his surviving brother, Kallu, who are now a schoolteacher and factory manager, respectively. With the loss of Saroo and Guddu, their mother had been able to afford to send the other two to school. The reunion was extensively covered by Indian and international media.

== Aftermath ==
Saroo continues to live in Hobart. He and his Indian family are now able to communicate regularly, taking advantage of a computer at the home of one of Kallu's neighbours. He bought his mother a house, and financially supports her so she no longer has to work. Saroo offered to bring his mother to Australia, but she said she preferred to stay in India, while also noting that Saroo does not speak much Hindi and she does not speak much English, so it would be difficult to communicate if she moved to Australia. She also has cited cultural differences between Australia and India, and has indicated that she prefers living in India.

Saroo has returned to India and visited his biological family over a dozen times. On one trip, he travelled first class on the Kolkata Mail, a train service from Mumbai to Kolkata, to re-trace his journey of a quarter-century earlier.

Penguin Australia published Saroo's book A Long Way Home in 2013. In it, he describes his ordeal as a lost six-year-old, his adoption, and his search for his Indian family.

Lion, a 2016 film based on Saroo's life directed by Garth Davis and starring Dev Patel, Nicole Kidman, David Wenham, and Rooney Mara, premiered to rave reviews and "Oscar buzz" at the 2016 Toronto International Film Festival. It received six nominations at the 89th Academy Awards, but did not take home any awards. Saroo was portrayed in the film by both newcomer Sunny Pawar and Dev Patel, who was nominated for the Academy Award for Best Supporting Actor for his performance.

In April 2019, Saroo announced that he is conducting a search for his father, who left him and his family when he was a young child.
