= Lion (2016 film) =

2016 biographical drama film by Garth Davis

- Australian release poster
- Directed by: Garth Davis
- Screenplay by: Luke Davies
- Based on: A Long Way Home by Saroo Brierley
- Produced by: Emile Sherman; Iain Canning; Angie Fielder
- Starring: Dev Patel; Sunny Pawar; Rooney Mara; David Wenham; Nicole Kidman
- Cinematography: Greig Fraser
- Edited by: Alexandre de Franceschi
- Music by: Dustin O'Halloran; Hauschka
- Production companies: The Weinstein Company; Screen Australia; See-Saw Films; Aquarius Films; Sunstar Entertainment
- Distributed by: Transmission Films (Australia); Entertainment Film Distributors (United Kingdom and Ireland)
- Release dates: 10 September 2016 (TIFF); 19 January 2017 (Australia); 20 January 2017 (United Kingdom)
- Running time: 118 minutes
- Countries: Australia; United Kingdom; United States; India
- Languages: English; Hindi; Bengali
- Budget: $12 million
- Box office: $140.9 million

Lion is a 2016 Australian biographical drama film directed by Garth Davis (in his feature directorial debut) from a screenplay by Luke Davies based on the 2013 nonfiction book A Long Way Home by Saroo Brierley. The film stars Dev Patel, Sunny Pawar, Rooney Mara, David Wenham, and Nicole Kidman, as well as Abhishek Bharate, Divian Ladwa, Priyanka Bose, Deepti Naval, Tannishtha Chatterjee, and Nawazuddin Siddiqui. It tells the true story of how Brierley, 25 years after being separated from his family in India, set out to find them. It was a joint production between Australia and the United Kingdom.

The film, which had its world premiere at the Toronto International Film Festival on 10 September 2016, was given a limited release in North America on 25 November 2016 by the Weinstein Company before opening wide on 6 January 2017. It was released in Australia on 19 January 2017 and in the United Kingdom on 20 January 2017.

Lion was well-received by critics, with praise for the acting (particularly Patel's and Kidman's), emotional weight, visuals, cinematography, and screenplay. It received six Oscar nominations at the 89th Academy Awards, including for Best Picture, Best Supporting Actor (Patel), Best Supporting Actress (Kidman), and Best Adapted Screenplay. At the 70th British Academy Film Awards, the film won the BAFTA Awards for Best Supporting Actor (Patel) and Best Adapted Screenplay. The film was also commercially successful, making $140 million worldwide and becoming one of the highest-grossing Australian films of all time.

== Plot ==
In 1986, five-year-old Saroo lives with his elder brother, Guddu; his baby sister, Shekila; and his mother in Khandwa, Madhya Pradesh, India. Saroo accompanies Guddu to work, and they arrive at a nearby train station, where Saroo falls asleep on a bench and is unable to find Guddu upon waking. He searches for him on an empty train, only to fall asleep in one of the compartments and wake later to find the train in motion and the doors locked. After several days, the train arrives in faraway Calcutta, where Saroo does not understand the local Bengali language. He tries to obtain a ticket home, but the attendant does not recognise the name of his village, which Saroo says is "Ganestalay". He spends the night in the station with some street children and flees when a group of men tries to kidnap them.

Saroo wanders around the city before meeting Noor, a seemingly friendly woman who takes him back to her apartment and tells him that a man named Rama will help him find his way home. Saroo escapes, sensing that Noor and Rama have sinister intentions, and evades Noor when she chases him. After two months of living near the Howrah Bridge, Saroo is taken to the police and placed into an orphanage when authorities are unable to find his family.

An advertisement about Saroo is placed in local newspapers. No one responds, but an Australian couple has become interested in adopting him. Saroo is taught basic English and moves to Hobart, Tasmania, in 1987, under the care of Sue and John Brierley. A year later, the Brierleys adopt another boy, Mantosh, who has trouble adjusting to his new home and suffers from rage and self-harm.

Twenty years later, Saroo moves to Melbourne to study hotel management and starts a relationship with an American student, Lucy. When asked where he's from, he responds that he's from Calcutta. During a meal with some Indian friends at their home, Saroo recognises the jalebis, a dish that he had loved as a child. He reveals that he is not from Calcutta and was separated from his birth family more than 20 years earlier. His friends suggest he use Google Earth to search for his hometown. Saroo begins to do research and becomes obsessive and withdraws from Lucy and his adoptive family, without telling the latter about his search for his biological family.

Eventually, after hearing his adoptive mother is not doing well because he has pulled away and Mantosh (who has substance abuse issues) has gone missing, Saroo visits her to apologise and learns that she is not infertile, as he had always assumed, but wanted to help children in need through adoption. One night, Saroo recognises the rock formations where his mother worked and finds the area where he lived: the Ganesh Talai neighbourhood of the Khandwa district. After reconciling with Lucy, he tells his adoptive mother about his search, and she fully supports his efforts.

Saroo returns to Ganesh Talai and, with the help of a local English speaker, has an emotional reunion with his biological mother and sister, but is heartbroken to learn that Guddu was hit and killed by a train the night they were separated. His mother remained in the village for the 25 years since he went missing because she never gave up hope that he would return. In addition to mispronouncing his home village's name, Saroo learns that he also mispronounced his own name as a child, as his biological parents named him not "Saroo" but "Sheru", meaning "lion".

== Cast ==
- Dev Patel as Saroo Brierley
  - Sunny Pawar as Young Saroo Brierley
- Rooney Mara as Lucy, Saroo's partner
- David Wenham as John Brierley, Saroo's adoptive father
- Nicole Kidman as Sue Brierley, Saroo's adoptive mother
- Abhishek Bharate as Guddu Khan, Saroo's biological brother
- Divian Ladwa as Mantosh Brierley, Saroo's adoptive brother
  - Keshav Jadhav as Young Mantosh
- Priyanka Bose as Kamla Munshi, Saroo's biological mother
- Rohini Kargaiya as Shekila, Saroo's biological sister
  - Khushi Solanki as Young Shekila
- Deepti Naval as Saroj Sood, founder of the Indian Society for Sponsorship and Adoption (ISSA)
- Tannishtha Chatterjee as Noor, a Calcutta woman who briefly takes in young Saroo
- Nawazuddin Siddiqui as Rama, an acquaintance of Noor
- Riddhi Sen as Café Man, who brings young Saroo to the authorities in Calcutta
- Kaushik Sen as Police Official in Calcutta
- Rita Roy as Amita, Saroo's friend at the orphanage
- Menik Gooneratne as Swarmina, who chaperones Saroo, and later Mantosh, on their flights from India to Tasmania
- Pallavi Sharda as Prama, Saroo's college friend
- Sachin Joab as Bharat, Saroo's college friend
- Arka Das as Sami, Saroo's college friend
- Madhukar Narlwade as English Speaking Man
- Daniela Farinacci as Tutor

== Production ==
=== Writing ===
An Australian film, Lion is based on Saroo Brierley's memoir A Long Way Home. In an interview, screenwriter Luke Davies acknowledged the challenges of adapting a book that is primarily about an online search:

It was finding the right balance of the big cinema "no-no", which is that screens on screens is not good. Yet we felt very strongly that our situation was quite different from the usual procedural crime drama TV model, where there are a whole bunch of actors that are crammed with exposition-heavy dialogue pointing at computer screens. We felt that we were a million miles away from that. The relationship with the technology was instigated by a purely and deeply emotional drive and desire to make it to the end of the myth—to find wholeness with the reunification with the lost mother and to find out who you are.

=== Casting ===
Dev Patel and Nicole Kidman were cast in the film in October 2014. Nawazuddin Siddiqui, Priyanka Bose, Tannishtha Chatterjee, and Deepti Naval joined the cast in January 2015; Rooney Mara, David Wenham, and Divian Ladwa were cast in April; and Pallavi Sharda joined the cast in August.

=== Filming ===
Principal photography on the film began in January 2015 in Kolkata, India. Then it was filmed extensively in Madhya Pradesh, focusing on locations central to Saroo's childhood, primarily in and around Khandwa (especially Ganesh Talai), with scenes also shot at Ujjain, Dewas (Railway Station), Patalpani waterfall, Mhow (Gwaloo village), and the Narmada River area near Omkareshwar Temple. Filming moved to Melbourne in mid-April, and then to several locations in Tasmania, including Hobart. Kidman filmed her scenes in Australia.

=== Music ===
Dustin O'Halloran and Hauschka composed the film's score. Sia wrote the song "Never Give Up" for the film. Also included are Jimmy Radcliffe's "The Sun, the Sand and the Sea", performed by Picturetone Pete, and "Urvasi Urvasi" by A. R. Rahman. Other songs featured in the film include "Blind" by Hercules and Love Affair, "State of the Heart" by Mondo Rock, and "The Rivers of Belief" by Enigma. In one scene, Noor sings along with "Come Closer", an iconic track from 'Disco King' Bappi Lahiri from the 1984 film Kasam Paida Karne Wale Ki.

== Release ==
Lion had its world premiere on 10 September 2016 at the Toronto International Film Festival. It served as the opening night film at the Zurich Film Festival on 22 September. It also screened at the London Film Festival on 12 October, and at the Hamptons International Film Festival on 7 and 8 October. The film was released in the United States on 25 November 2016, in Australia on 19 January 2017, and in the United Kingdom on 20 January. A special red carpet charity event for its Tasmanian premiere was attended by the film's subject, Saroo Brierley, and his family at the State Cinema in December 2016.

The film was made available on Digital HD on 28 March 2017, followed by a Blu-ray and DVD release on 11 April. It debuted at No. 10 on the Top 20 NPD VideoScan chart.

== Reception ==
=== Box office ===
Lion grossed $51.7 million in the United States and Canada and $89.1 million in other countries for a worldwide total of $140.9 million, against a production budget of $12 million.

In its limited opening weekend in the United States and Canada, the film made $123,360 from four theatres (an average of $30,840, the highest of the weekend). On the weekend of 17–19 March 2017, Lion crossed the $50 million mark at the North American box-office, becoming the fifth 2016 film among the Academy Award for Best Picture nominees to surpass this threshold.

In Australia, the film opened at number one with $3.18 million, the biggest opening ever for an Australian indie film and the fifth-biggest debut for an Australian film overall. It grossed $29.6 million in the country, becoming the fifth highest-grossing Australian film ever at the Australian box office.

=== Critical response ===
The film received very positive reviews, with Patel's and Kidman's performances particularly praised. On the review aggregator website Rotten Tomatoes, 84% of 270 critics' reviews are positive, with an average rating of 7.3/10. The website's consensus reads: "Lion's undeniably uplifting story and talented cast make it a moving journey that transcends the typical cliches of its genre." Metacritic, which uses a weighted average, assigned the film a score of 69 out of 100, based on 45 critics, indicating "generally favorable" reviews. PostTrak reported that 92% of audience members gave the film a rating of either "excellent" or "very good".

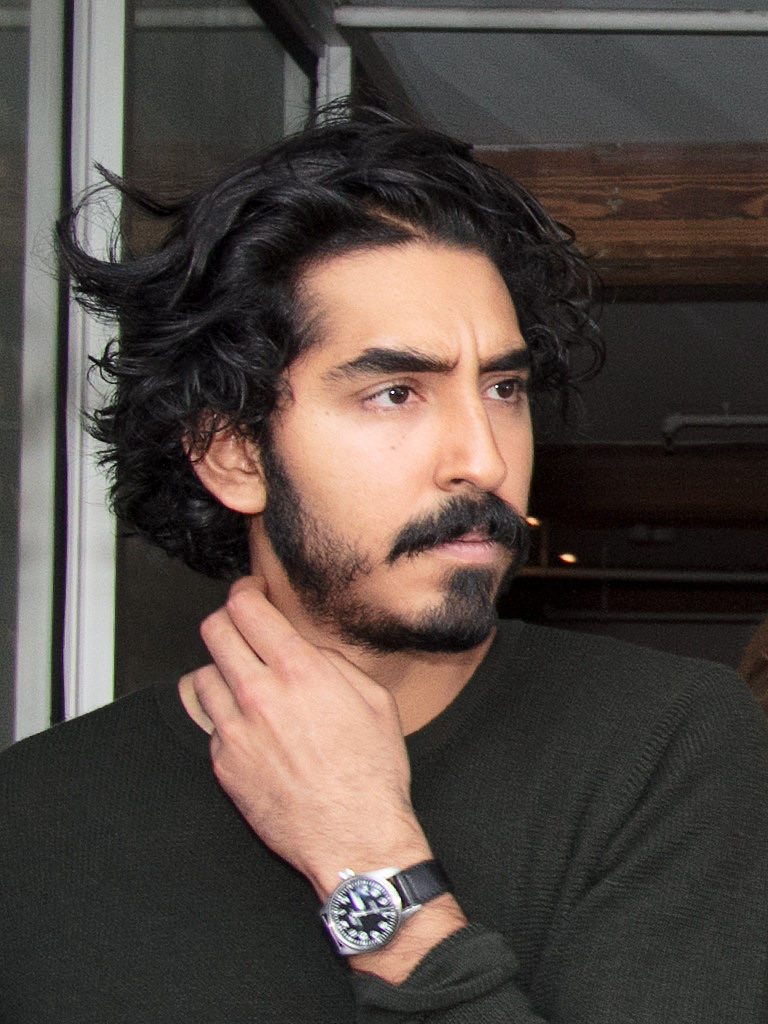
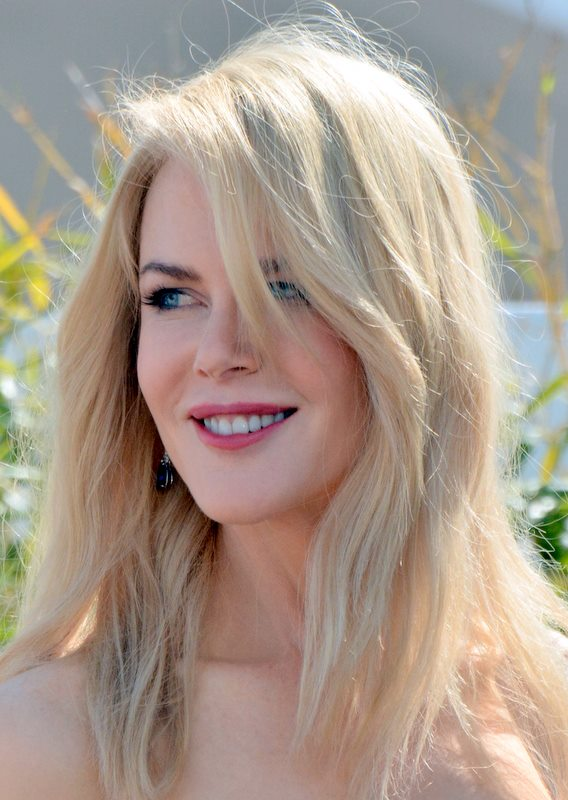
The performances of Dev Patel and Nicole Kidman garnered positive reviews, earning them Academy Award nominations for Best Supporting Actor and Best Supporting Actress respectively.

Brian Truitt of USA Today wrote: "The finale is manipulative in every way, squeezing out the emotions of the audience. But Lion's well-plotted narrative and thoughtful characters suck you in so much that the journey there is totally worth it." Novelist and critic Salman Rushdie thought highly of the film, saying that, while he often lacks interest in films nominated for an Oscar, he rooted for Lion and "would like it to win in every category it's nominated for and in most of the categories it isn't nominated for as well." Noting that he wept "unstoppably" while viewing the film, Rushdie said he is "frequently suspicious of Western films set in contemporary India, and so one of the things that most impressed me about Lion was the authenticity and truth and unsparing realism of its Indian first half. Every moment of the little boy's journey rings true—not an instant of exoticism—and as a result his plight touches us all. Greig Fraser's cinematography portrays the beauty of the country, both honestly and exquisitely [...] Dev Patel and Nicole Kidman, in the film's Australian second half, give wonderful performances too."

Some critics mentioned that parts of the film move at a slow pace. For example, Anthony Lane of The New Yorker wrote: "though wrenching, there is barely enough of it to fill the dramatic space, and the second half is a slow and muted affair after the Dickensian punch of the first."

=== Accolades ===
Lion received six Oscar nominations at the 89th Academy Awards, including Best Picture, Best Supporting Actor (Patel), Best Supporting Actress (Kidman), and Best Adapted Screenplay, but did not win in any of the categories. It did, however, win two BAFTA Awards: Best Actor in a Supporting Role (Patel) and Best Adapted Screenplay. At Australia's 7th AACTA Awards, the film won all twelve awards for which it was nominated, including Best Film.

== See also ==
- Bashu, the Little Stranger
