= A Long Way Home (book) =

Non-fiction book by written by Saroo Brierley with Larry Buttrose

- First edition (paperback)
- Author: Saroo Brierley; Larry Buttrose
- Language: English
- Subject: Autobiography
- Genre: Non-fiction
- Set in: India, Australia
- Publisher: Viking Australia
- Publication date: 24 June 2013
- Publication place: Australia
- Media type: Print, e-book
- Pages: 272
- ISBN: 9780670077045
- OCLC: 870975729

A Long Way Home is a non-fiction book by Indian-Australian businessman Saroo Brierley written together with Larry Buttrose. The text was initially released in Australia on 24 June 2013 via Viking, then re-released internationally in 2014, and adapted into a major film in 2016.

== Background ==
In this autobiographical book, Brierley covers three decades of his life, describing his ordeals and adventures as a lost five-year-old in rural India, his adoption by a middle-class Australian family, and his search for his Indian native family some 25 years later.

In an interview with ABC Radio Sydney, Larry Buttrose explained that "From the very first time I came in contact with the story, I knew it was a fantastic story,... It was a film crying to be made". Buttrose recorded hours of interviews with both Saroo and his adoptive mother and completed a 70,000-word manuscript in a hotel room in Kolkata to meet a tough three-month deadline set by the publisher.

== Reception ==
Karina Wetherbee of Vail Daily stated "There is a real feeling of catharsis when reading Brierley's astounding narrative, in the classic sense of a happy ending, for the journey of the author as a boy — and then again as a young man — evokes the audacity of a fable, but it is set in the real world, a place where wonderment and miraculous occurrences can often seem wanting". Dianne Dempsey of The Sydney Morning Herald commented "Brierley writes in a straightforward manner without trying to do anything fancy except tell a remarkable story. As well as the tale of his quest, he provides an informative and fascinating insight into how Third World families live with, and somehow survive, their poverty". Taylor Dibbert of International Policy Digest added "It's not hard to understand why this work has received such high praise. This is an honest story of pain, struggle, hope and love. He concludes the book on a reflective note... Brierley's journey is inspirational and deeply moving; it's another reminder of how potent passion and the human spirit actually are".

Retitled Lion, the book was on The New York Times Best Seller list for Paperback Nonfiction for six weeks during the first quarter of 2017.

== Film ==
In 2016, the book was adapted into major international feature film Lion, directed by Garth Davis and starring Dev Patel, Nicole Kidman and Rooney Mara. The film premiered at the 2016 Toronto International Film Festival. Dev Patel was nominated for the Academy Award for Best Supporting Actor.
