= Gerard Lee =

Australian writer (1951–2025)

Gerard Lee (23 November 1951 – 25 November 2025) was an Australian screenwriter, novelist, and director. He was best known for his contributions to Australian independent cinema and for his long-standing collaboration with Jane Campion.

== Early life and education ==
Gerard Lee was born in Melbourne in 1951 and brought up in Brisbane in the 1960s in the inner southern suburb of Dutton Park. Lee began writing for The Telegraph newspaper as a cadet at the age of 16 before later attending the University of Queensland and the Australian Film, Television and Radio School. He submitted the feature-length film script Swell and accompanying thesis for a Master of Arts degree to the Queensland University of Technology in 2003.

== Career ==
Lee started as a poet and drummer (including sitting in as the drummer for the first performance by Brisbane band, the Go-Betweens). He later migrated to fiction and travel writing, before focusing on writing for film and television.

As a prose writer, Lee published two novels, a collection of short stories and a collection of travel stories, all with University of Queensland Press. The Oxford Companion to Australian Literature stated of Lee in a commentary on his first novel, True Love and How to Get It, "...a witty writer with a deceptively naive narrative style, Lee frequently satirises contemporary Queensland lifestyles". His second novel, Troppo Man (1990), set in Ubud, Bali, was shortlisted for the Vogel's Young Writers Award.

In the 1980s, Lee met Jane Campion at AFTRS and later co-wrote her feature debut, Sweetie, which won Best Screenplay at the Australian Film Institute Awards, a Caméra d'Or at Cannes, and many other awards. It was screened internationally and is now part of The Criterion Collection.

Lee's own feature film All Men Are Liars, set in the Queensland cane fields, which he wrote and directed, opened the Sydney Film Festival in 1995 and won awards internationally (Palm Springs International Film Festival).

Lee produced and wrote the screenplay for the film My Mistress, starring Emmanuelle Béart and Harrison Sloan Gilbertson, which was released November 2014 and sold in many territories. It is the story of a relationship between a 16-year-old boy and a 40-something S&M mistress.

As a television writer, Gerard Lee was the co-writer with Jane Campion of the successful mini-series Top of the Lake, which garnered eight Emmy nominations for the first series.

He was also the principal screenwriter of the film Breath adapted from the novel of the same name by Tim Winton. It was released in the US in 2018, produced by Simon Baker (also director/actor/producer) and Mark Johnson (Breaking Bad).

Lee had bee working for many years on a script, titled Persian Blue, about an Aboriginal unscrupulous opportunist who convinces a luckless outback community he is a mystic from India sent to save them. Lee could not find an Aboriginal co-writer and script supervisor, as required by the protocols of Creative Australia for First Nations people's stories, even if fictional, so he self-published the story as a novel, The Big Galah, in 2024. Lee claims that his screenplay was used by the creators of the 2022 TV series Irreverent.

== Death ==
Lee died on 25 November 2025.

== Books ==
- Manual for a Garden Mechanic (1976) (Ragman Productions, Robert Kenny, Melbourne)
- Pieces for a Glass Piano (1978), ISBN 0-7022-1175-3
- True Love and How to Get It (1985), ISBN 0-7022-1778-6
- Troppo Man (1990), a comedy novel set in Ubud, Bali. ISBN 0-7022-2299-2
- Sweetie: The Screenplay (1991), ISBN 0-7022-2371-9
- Eating Dog: Travel Stories (1994), ISBN 0-7022-2184-8
- The Big Galah (2024) A script novel (Scrovel) discussing themes of identity, belief and truth, set in outback Australia ISBN 978-1763831803

== Television ==
- Top of the Lake (2013), a seven-hour drama serial, set in the South Island of New Zealand, co-created and co-written with Jane Campion.
- Top of the Lake: China Girl (2017) a seven-hour drama set in Sydney, Australia co-written with Jane Campion.

== Short films ==
- Passionless Moments (1983), co-written and co-directed with Jane Campion

== Feature films ==
- Sweetie (1989), co-written with Jane Campion
- All Men Are Liars (1995), writer/director
- My Mistress (2013), writer/producer
- Breath (2014) writer
