= Shaun Duggan =

English writer (born 1970)

- Born: 25 May 1970 (age 55); Liverpool, England
- Occupations: playwright; television writer
- Years active: 1986+
- Notable work: Brookside; EastEnders; Jamie Johnson

Shaun Duggan (born 1970) is a BAFTA and International Emmy nominated English writer based in the UK. He has repeatedly collaborated with Jimmy McGovern. He has written several plays and has worked extensively for television including Brookside (Channel 4), EastEnders (BBC1), and Jamie Johnson (CBBC).

== Early life and career ==
Like McGovern, Duggan is associated with a realist tradition centring on documenting life in his home town of Liverpool. Born in Norris Green, Duggan's writing career began at the age of 16, when his play William, inspired by The Smiths song "William, It Was Really Nothing", was produced at London's Royal Court Theatre Upstairs as part of their Young Writers' Festival, 1986. Shaun was befriended by his hero, Morrissey, who also interviewed him about the play on Channel 4's The Tube. Shaun continued to write other stage plays for the Liverpool Everyman and the Playhouse, including It's Nearly June, A Brusque Affair, All Lips and Sex; and Boy, (winner of the Liverpool Echo and Daily Post Best Writing Award), which went on a UK tour before transferring to the Lyric Studio, London. His play Drama Queen was produced in Liverpool for the Homotopia lesbian and gay arts festival as part of the city's Capital of Culture celebrations in 2008.

== Television ==
Duggan spent eight years writing for the Liverpool-set soap opera, Brookside, writing over 100 episodes; he wrote the episode that featured the first pre-watershed lesbian kiss on British television when Beth Jordache (Anna Friel) began a relationship with the Farnhams' nanny Margaret Clemence (Nicola Stephenson) in January 1994. The kiss was seen by an estimated global audience of one billion when Danny Boyle included it in the Olympics opening ceremony of London 2012. As a result the kiss was shown in countries such as Saudi Arabia, where it is illegal to be gay. No other gay kiss has ever been shown on television in the Middle Eastern country.

Duggan has also written extensively for television. In addition to Brookside he spent four years on the script-team of EastEnders. Other television work includes Is Harry on the Boat (BSkyB), Maisie Raine, (BBC), Waterloo Road (BBC), Jiggery Pokery (BBC), High Rise, Low Life (Channel 4), Stepping Up (CBBC) and Justice (BBC1).

Duggan received a BAFTA nomination in 2013 for the opening episode of the second series of Jimmy McGovern's Accused (starring Sean Bean in a BAFTA-nominated/RTS Award winning/International Emmy Award winning performance as cross-dressing teacher, 'Tracie' Tremarco). Caitlin Moran said in The Times "It was physically affecting — that brilliant, drug-like transcendence where you're floating inside a story… I can’t remember the last time I was so on the side of someone in a script."

Having created the role of 'Tracie Tremarco' for Jimmy McGovern, Duggan has also written eight episodes of McGovern's Moving On (BBC1): Losing My Religion (2010), Donor (2011), Friends Like These (2013), Fledgling (2013), Madge (2014) A Picture of Innocence (2015) "Zero (2016) and Lost (2018)

He also co-wrote the fifth episode of McGovern's series Banished (2015).

Duggan also wrote episode 5 of the Jimmy McGovern series Broken (BBC1), starring Sean Bean as a Catholic priest. His episode focused on the story of Carl McKenna (played by Ned Dennehy) and challenged homophobia in the Catholic church. It was aired in the summer of 2017.

Duggan is also the lead writer on the popular CBBC show Jamie Johnson, having written the original pilot episode based on the books by Dan Freedman. The drama focuses on a young working class boy who dreams of becoming a famous player. Many top sporting personalities have made cameos in the show including Jurgen Klopp, Gareth Southgate, Steven Gerrard, Gary Linekar, Marcus Rashford, Jessie Lingard to name just a few. Series 6 is currently in pre-production. In 2017 the second series of Jamie Johnson was nominated for a BAFTA and International Emmy for best children's drama. Series 3 was also nominated for an International Emmy Award in the best drama category.
