= Garth Davis =

Australian film and television director

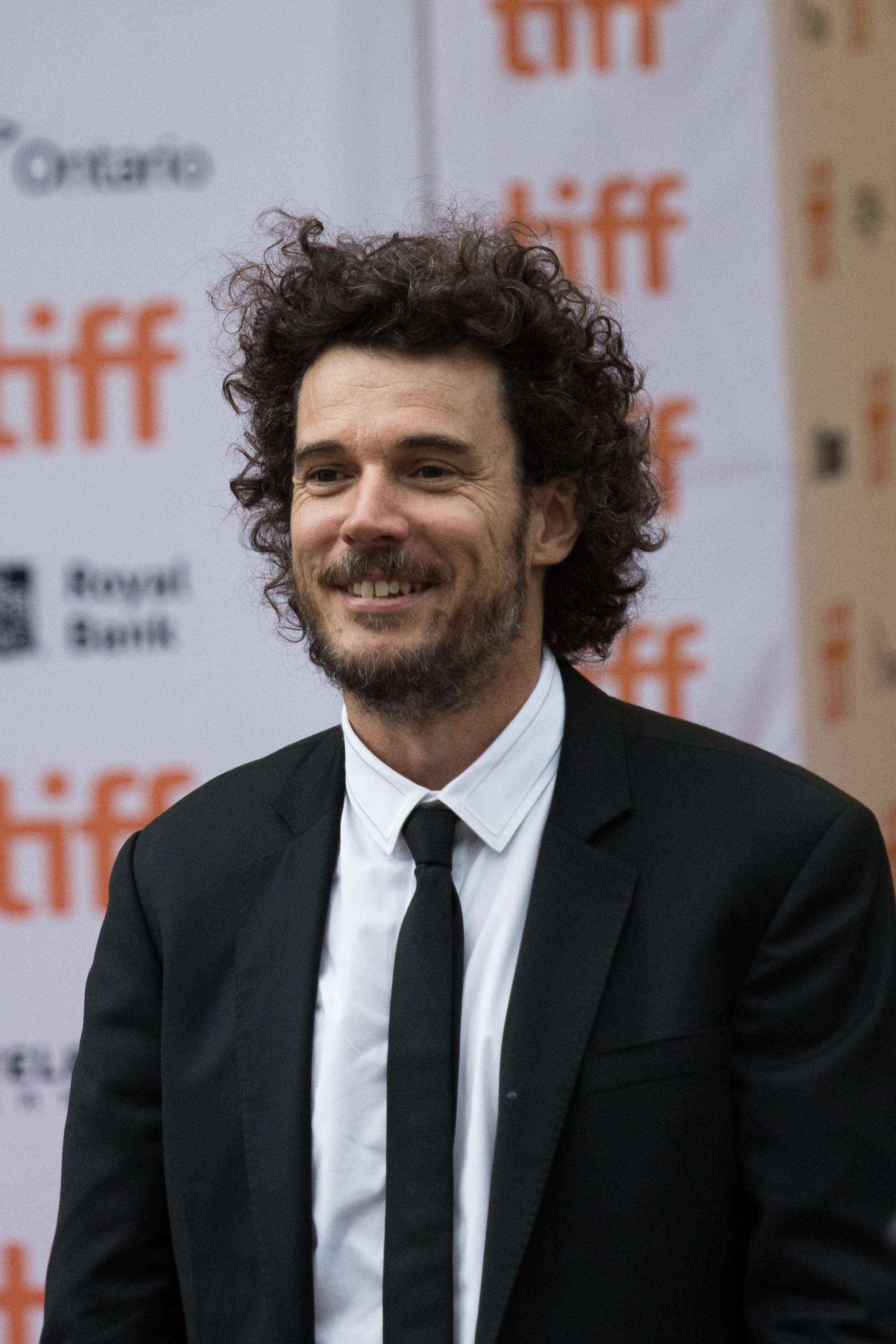
- Davis at the 2016 Toronto International Film Festival
- Born: 1974 (age 51–52); Brisbane, Queensland, Australia
- Occupation: Film director
- Years active: 2000–present
- Partner: Nicola Lester
- Children: 3

Garth Davis (born 1974) is an Australian television, advertising, and film director, best known for directing the films Lion (2016), and biblical drama Mary Magdalene (2018). He earlier directed episodes of the series Top of the Lake (2013).

== Biography ==
Garth Davis was born in 1974.

Davis directed several episodes of the series Top of the Lake (2013).

In October 2013, Warner Bros. Pictures hired Davis to direct a film adaptation of Shantaram, but that did not come to fruition; instead, it was later made into a television adaptation for Apple TV+.

He directed The Weinstein Company film Lion, in his feature film directorial debut, which premiered to rave reviews at the Toronto International Film Festival in 2016.

In January 2016, Davis was hired to direct a biopic about Mary Magdalene, titled Mary Magdalene, written by Helen Edmundson. The film had its world premiere at the National Portrait Gallery in London in February 2018.

In 2019, Davis teamed up with See-Saw Films joint directors Emile Sherman and Iain Canning in a new production company called I AM THAT, with Samantha Lang as head of development.

In August 2020, it was announced that Davis would direct a sequel to Tron: Legacy, titled Tron: Ares, for Walt Disney Pictures. In January 2023, it was announced that Joachim Rønning would instead direct the film.

In April 2022, Screen Australia announced funding for Immersion, a science fiction drama TV series to be directed by Davis, written by Matt Vesely (Aftertaste) and executive produced by Emile Sherman (The King's Speech) and director/producer Samantha Lang.

In May 2026 it was announced that Davis would be directing an adaptation of The Midnight Library, starring Florence Pugh, whom he had directed in East of Eden.

== Awards ==
- 2008: Gold Lion at the Cannes Lions International Festival of Creativity, and a D&AD Yellow Pencil, for the Schweppes commercial "Burst"
- 2010: Finalist in the Directors Guild of America Award for Best Commercials Director
- 2013: Emmy Award nomination for Direction for Top of the Lake (which also won three other Emmys)
- 2016: Lion was nominated for six Oscars at the 89th Academy Awards in 2016, including Best Picture
- 2016: Directors Guild of America Award for Best Direction, Lion

== Personal life ==
Davis lives in Australia with his three children and partner Nicola Lester.

== Filmography ==
Film

Year	Title	Director	Writer	Producer
2016	Lion	Yes	No	No
2018	Mary Magdalene	Yes	No	No
2023	Foe	Yes	Yes	Yes

Short film

Year	Title	Notes
2000	P.I.N.S.	Documentary short, Also cinematographer
2003	Alice	

Television

Year	Title	Notes
2006	Love My Way	3 episodes
2013	Top of the Lake	8 episodes (Co-directed 4 episodes with Jane Campion)
2026	East of Eden	4 episodes, Also executive producer
