= 1989 Australian Film Institute Awards =

Australian film and television award ceremony

31st Australian Film Institute Awards
- Date: 11 October 1989
- Location: Palais Theatre, Melbourne, Australia

Television/radio coverage
- Networks
- ABC-TV

The 31st Australian Film Institute Awards were awards held by the Australian Film Institute to celebrate the best of Australian films and television of 1989. The awards ceremony was held at the Palais Theatre in Melbourne on Wednesday 11 October 1989 and broadcast on ABC-TV.

== Feature film ==
Best Film: Evil Angels — Verity Lambert; Ghosts... of the Civil Dead — Evan English; Island — Paul Cox, Santhana Naidu; Dead Calm — Terry Hayes, Doug Mitchell, George Miller	Best Direction: Fred Schepisi — Evil Angels; Phillip Noyce — Dead Calm; Ben Lewin — Georgia; Paul Cox — Island
Best Lead Actor: Sam Neill — Evil Angels; John Hargreaves — Emerald City; Mike Bishop — Ghosts... of the Civil Dead; Chris Haywood — Island	Best Lead Actress: Meryl Streep — Evil Angels; Judy Davis — Georgia; Irene Papas — Island; Genevieve Lemon — Sweetie
Best Supporting Actor: Chris Haywood — Emerald City; Bogdan Koca — Ghosts... of the Civil Dead; Kim Gyngell — Heaven Tonight; John Darling — Sweetie	Best Supporting Actress: Victoria Longley — Celia; Maryanne Fahey — Celia; Nicole Kidman — Emerald City; Dorothy Barry — Sweetie
Best Original Screenplay: Gerard Lee, Jane Campion — Sweetie; Ben Lewin, Joanna Murray-Smith — Georgia; Gene Conkie, Evan English, John Hillcoat — Ghosts... of the Civil Dead; Paul Cox — Island	Best Adapted Screenplay: Robert Caswell, Fred Schepisi — Evil Angels; Abe Pogos — Compo; Terry Hayes — Dead Calm; David Williamson — Emerald City
Best Cinematography: Dead Calm — Dean Semler; Emerald City — Paul Murphy; Georgia — Yuri Sokol; Sweetie — Sally Bongers	Best Editing: Dead Calm — Richard Francis-Bruce; Evil Angels — Jill Bilcock; Ghosts... of the Civil Dead — Stewart Young; Island — John Scott
Best Original Music Score: Dead Calm — Graeme Revell; Evil Angels — Bruce Smeaton; Georgia — Paul Grabowsky; Ghosts... of the Civil Dead — Nick Cave, Mick Harvey, Blixa Bargeld	Best Sound: Dead Calm — Ben Osmo, Lee Smith, Roger Savage; Evil Angels — Craig Carter, Terry Rodman, Peter Fenton, Martin Oswin; Georgia — John Phillips, Roger Savage, Frank Lipson, Ross Porter; Ghosts... of the Civil Dead — Bronwyn Murphy, Rex Watts, Peter Clancy
Best Production Design: Ghosts... of the Civil Dead — Chris Kennedy; Dead Calm — Graham Walker; Georgia — Jon Dowding; Island — Neil Angwin	Best Costume Design: What The Moon Saw — Rose Chong; Georgia — Aphrodite Kondos; Ghosts... of the Civil Dead — Karen Everett; Sons of Steel — Gary L. Keady, Nicholas Huxley, Nicola Braithwaite

== Television ==
Best Telefeature: Police State (ABC) — Rod Allan; Prejudice (Nine Network) — Pamela Williams; Rescue (ABC) — John Edwards; Malpractice — Tristram Miall	Best Mini Series: Edens Lost (ABC) — Margaret Fink; Act of Betrayal (ABC) — Ray Alchin, Nick Evans; Bodysurfer (ABC) — Ross Matthews; Barlow & Chambers: A Long Way From Home (Nine Network) — Matt Carroll, Steve Krantz
Best Achievement in Direction in a Telefeature: Rescue (ABC) — Peter Fisk; Malpractice — Bill Bennett; Prejudice (Nine Network) — Ian Munro; Police State (ABC) — Chris Noonan	Best Achievement in Direction in a Mini Series: Edens Lost (ABC) — Neil Armfield; Bodysurfer (ABC) — Ian Barry; Act of Betrayal (ABC) — Lawrence Gordon Clark; This Man, This Woman (ABC) — Paul Moloney
Best Performance by an Actor in a Telefeature: Bill Hunter — Police State (ABC); Bob Baines — Malpractice; Gary Sweet — Rescue (ABC); Max Phipps — Police State (ABC)	Best Performance by an Actress in a Telefeature: Pat Thomson — Malpractice; Caz Lederman — Malpractice; Grace Parr — Prejudice (Nine Network); Sonia Todd — Rescue (ABC)
Best Performance by an Actor in a Mini Series: Peter Kowitz — Bodysurfer (ABC); Patrick Bergin — Act of Betrayal (ABC); John Jarrett — Fields of Fire III (Nine Network); John Polson — Barlow & Chambers: A Long Way From Home (Nine Network)	Best Performance by an Actress in a Mini Series: Julia Blake — Edens Lost (ABC); Victoria Longley — Edens Lost (ABC); Lisa Harrow — Act of Betrayal (ABC); Linda Cropper — Edens Lost (ABC)
Best Screenplay in a Telefeature: Police State (ABC) — Ian David, Francine Finnane; Malpractice — Jenny Ainge; Rescue (ABC) — Everett De Roche; Prejudice (Nine Network) — Pamela Williams	Best Screenplay in a Mini Series: Bodysurfer (ABC) — Suzanne Hawley, Christopher Lee, Denis Whitburn; Edens Lost (ABC) — Michael Gow; Act of Betrayal (ABC) — Nick Evans, Michael Chaplin; Barlow & Chambers: A Long Way From Home (Nine Network) — Bill Kerby
