= List of accolades received by The Power of the Dog (film) =

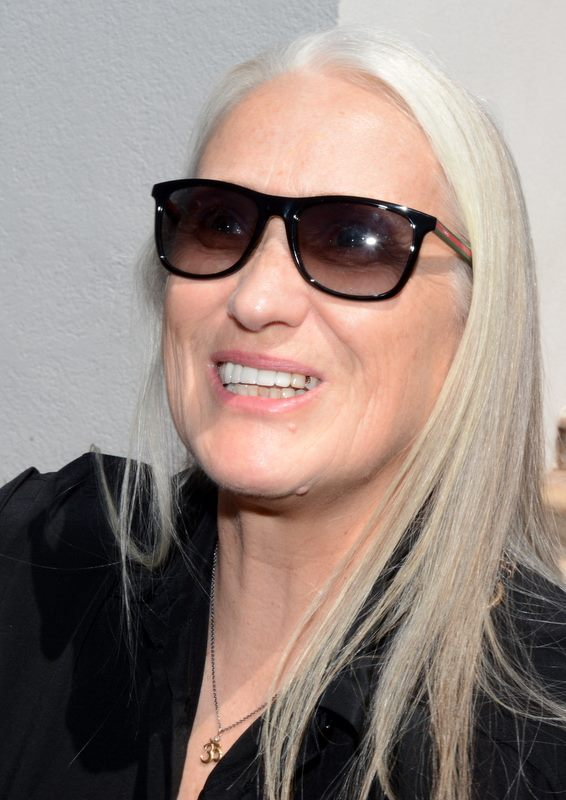
- Jane Campion received widespread critical acclaim for her direction and screenplay.
Awards and nominations
Award	Wins	Nominations
Academy Awards	1	12
Alliance of Women Film Journalists	11	12
American Film Institute Awards	1	1
American Society of Cinematographers	0	1
Austin Film Critics Association	5	9
Belgian Film Critics Association	0	1
Boston Society of Film Critics	2	2
British Academy Film Awards	2	7
Casting Society of America	0	1
Chicago Film Critics Association	7	8
Cinema Audio Society Awards	0	1
Critics' Choice Awards	4	10
Dallas–Fort Worth Film Critics Association	9	9
Detroit Film Critics Society	1	3
Dorian Awards	3	9
Florida Film Critics Circle	5	9
Georgia Film Critics Association	2	9
Gold Derby Awards	4	10
Golden Globe Awards	3	7
Houston Film Critics Society	5	9
Los Angeles Film Critics Association	6	6
National Society of Film Critics	5	5
New York Film Critics Circle	3	3
New York Film Critics Online	7	7
Online Film Critics Society	9	9
San Diego Film Critics Society	4	8
San Francisco Bay Area Film Critics Circle	8	9
Santa Barbara International Film Festival	3	3
Seattle Film Critics Society	2	11
Toronto International Film Festival	1	1
Venice Film Festival	1	2
Washington D.C. Area Film Critics Association	3	11
Women Film Critics Circle	2	2

Totals (Note: Certain award groups do not simply award one winner. They acknowledge several different recipients, have runners-up, and have third place. Since this is a specific recognition and is different from losing an award, runner-up mentions are considered wins in this award tally. For simplification and to avoid errors, each award in this list has been presumed to have had a prior nomination.)
- Wins: 238
- Nominations: 333

The Power of the Dog is a 2021 Western psychological drama film written and directed by Jane Campion, based on the 1967 novel of the same name by Thomas Savage. The film stars Benedict Cumberbatch, Kirsten Dunst, Jesse Plemons, and Kodi Smit-McPhee. The film deals with themes such as love, grief, resentment, jealousy and sexuality.

The film had its world premiere at the 78th Venice International Film Festival on September 2, 2021, where it received a four-minute standing ovation and Campion was awarded the Silver Lion for Best Direction. It also had Special Presentation screenings at the 2021 Toronto International Film Festival where it was second Runner-up for the People's Choice Award. The film had a limited theatrical release in Australia and New Zealand on November 11, 2021, and in the United Kingdom and in the United States on November 17; it was later released to stream worldwide on Netflix on December 1.

The Power of the Dog received universal critical acclaim for Campion's screenplay and direction, Greenwood's composing score, Wegner's cinematography, editing, visuals, and the performances of Cumberbatch, Smit-McPhee, Plemons and Dunst. It received a leading 12 nominations at the 94th Academy Awards, including Best Picture, Best Director for Campion, Best Actor for Cumberbatch, Best Supporting Actor for both Plemons and Smit-McPhee and Best Supporting Actress for Dunst, and was selected by the American Film Institute as one of its ten Movies of the Year.

The film garnered seven nominations at the 79th Golden Globe Awards including Best Actor – Motion Picture Drama and Best Supporting Actress – Motion Picture, winning Best Motion Picture – Drama, Best Director and Best Supporting Actor – Motion Picture for Smit-McPhee. It received three nominations at the 28th Screen Actors Guild Awards for Outstanding Performance by a Male Actor in a Leading Role, Outstanding Performance by a Male Actor in a Supporting Role and Outstanding Performance by a Female Actor in a Supporting Role. At the 75th British Academy Film Awards the film received eight nominations, including Best Film, Best Direction, Best Actor in a Leading Role, Best Actor in a Supporting Role and Best Adapted Screenplay, as well as ten nominations at the 27th Critics' Choice Awards, including Best Picture, Best Director, Best Actor, Best Supporting Actor, Best Supporting Actress and Best Adapted Screenplay. It became the first film directed by a woman to receive more than ten Academy Award nominations, and Campion became the first woman to receive more than one Academy Award nomination for Best Director, her first being for The Piano.

== Accolades ==
Award	Date of ceremony	Category	Recipient(s)	Result	Ref.
AACTA International Awards	January 26, 2022	Best Film	The Power of the Dog	Won	
AACTA International Awards	January 26, 2022	Best Direction	Jane Campion	Nominated	
AACTA International Awards	January 26, 2022	Best Actor	Benedict Cumberbatch	Won	
AACTA International Awards	January 26, 2022	Best Supporting Actor	Kodi Smit-McPhee	Won	
AACTA International Awards	January 26, 2022	Best Supporting Actress	Kirsten Dunst	Nominated	
AACTA International Awards	January 26, 2022	Best Screenplay	Jane Campion	Nominated	
Academy Awards	March 27, 2022	Best Picture	Jane Campion, Tanya Seghatchian, Emile Sherman, Iain Canning and Roger Frappier	Nominated	
Academy Awards	March 27, 2022	Best Director	Jane Campion	Won	
Academy Awards	March 27, 2022	Best Actor	Benedict Cumberbatch	Nominated	
Academy Awards	March 27, 2022	Best Supporting Actor	Jesse Plemons	Nominated	
Academy Awards	March 27, 2022	Best Supporting Actor	Kodi Smit-McPhee	Nominated	
Academy Awards	March 27, 2022	Best Supporting Actress	Kirsten Dunst	Nominated	
Academy Awards	March 27, 2022	Best Adapted Screenplay	Jane Campion	Nominated	
Academy Awards	March 27, 2022	Best Cinematography	Ari Wegner	Nominated	
Academy Awards	March 27, 2022	Best Film Editing	Peter Sciberras	Nominated	
Academy Awards	March 27, 2022	Best Original Score	Jonny Greenwood	Nominated	
Academy Awards	March 27, 2022	Best Production Design	Production Design: Grant Major; Set Decoration: Amber Richards	Nominated	
Academy Awards	March 27, 2022	Best Sound	Richard Flynn, Robert Mackenzie and Tara Webb	Nominated	
Alliance of Women Film Journalists	January 25, 2022	Best Film	The Power of the Dog	Won	
Alliance of Women Film Journalists	January 25, 2022	Best Director	Jane Campion	Won	
Alliance of Women Film Journalists	January 25, 2022	Best Screenplay, Adapted	Jane Campion	Won	
Alliance of Women Film Journalists	January 25, 2022	Best Actor	Benedict Cumberbatch	Won	
Alliance of Women Film Journalists	January 25, 2022	Best Actor in a Supporting Role	Jesse Plemons	Nominated	
Alliance of Women Film Journalists	January 25, 2022	Best Actor in a Supporting Role	Kodi Smit-McPhee	Won	
Alliance of Women Film Journalists	January 25, 2022	Best Actress in a Supporting Role	Kirsten Dunst	Won	
Alliance of Women Film Journalists	January 25, 2022	Best Ensemble Cast - Casting Director(s)	Nikki Barrett, Tina Cleary, Carmen Cuba, Nina Gold	Won	
Alliance of Women Film Journalists	January 25, 2022	Best Cinematography	Ari Wegner	Won	
Alliance of Women Film Journalists	January 25, 2022	Best Editing	Peter Sciberras	Won	
Alliance of Women Film Journalists	January 25, 2022	Best Woman Director	Jane Campion	Won	
Alliance of Women Film Journalists	January 25, 2022	Best Woman Screenwriter	Jane Campion	Won	
American Film Institute	January 7, 2022	Top 10 Movies of the Year	The Power of the Dog	Won	
American Society of Cinematographers	March 20, 2022	Outstanding Achievement in Cinematography in Theatrical Releases	Ari Wegner	Nominated	
Austin Film Critics Association	January 11, 2022	Best Film	The Power of the Dog	Won	
Austin Film Critics Association	January 11, 2022	Best Director	Jane Campion	Won	
Austin Film Critics Association	January 11, 2022	Best Actor	Benedict Cumberbatch	Nominated	
Austin Film Critics Association	January 11, 2022	Best Supporting Actor	Kodi Smit-McPhee	Won	
Austin Film Critics Association	January 11, 2022	Best Supporting Actress	Kirsten Dunst	Won	
Austin Film Critics Association	January 11, 2022	Best Adapted Screenplay	Jane Campion	Nominated	
Austin Film Critics Association	January 11, 2022	Best Original Score	Jonny Greenwood	Won	
Austin Film Critics Association	January 11, 2022	Best Cinematography	Ari Wegner	Nominated	
Austin Film Critics Association	January 11, 2022	Best Film Editing	Peter Sciberras	Nominated	
Belgian Film Critics Association	January 8, 2022	Grand Prix	The Power of the Dog	Nominated	
Boston Society of Film Critics	December 12, 2021	Best English Language Film	The Power of the Dog	Won	
Boston Society of Film Critics	December 12, 2021	Best Cinematography	Ari Wegner	Won	
British Academy Film Awards	March 13, 2022	Best Film	Jane Campion, Iain Canning, Roger Frappier, Tanya Seghatchian and Emile Sherman	Won	
British Academy Film Awards	March 13, 2022	Best Direction	Jane Campion	Won	
British Academy Film Awards	March 13, 2022	Best Actor in a Leading Role	Benedict Cumberbatch	Nominated	
British Academy Film Awards	March 13, 2022	Best Actor in a Supporting Role	Jesse Plemons	Nominated	
British Academy Film Awards	March 13, 2022	Best Actor in a Supporting Role	Kodi Smit-McPhee	Nominated	
British Academy Film Awards	March 13, 2022	Best Adapted Screenplay	Jane Campion	Nominated	
British Academy Film Awards	March 13, 2022	Best Cinematography	Ari Wegner	Nominated	
British Academy Film Awards	March 13, 2022	Best Original Music	Jonny Greenwood	Nominated	
Casting Society of America	March 23, 2022	Outstanding Achievement in Casting – Big Budget Feature (Drama)	Nikki Barrett, Carmen Cuba, Nina Gold, Martin Ware	Nominated	
Cinema Audio Society Awards	March 19, 2022	Outstanding Achievement in Sound Mixing for a Motion Picture – Live Action	Richard Flynn, Robert Mackenzie, Tara Webb, Graeme Stewart, Steve Burgess	Nominated	
Chicago Film Critics Association	December 15, 2021	Best Film	The Power of the Dog	Won	
Chicago Film Critics Association	December 15, 2021	Best Director	Jane Campion	Won	
Chicago Film Critics Association	December 15, 2021	Best Actor	Benedict Cumberbatch	Won	
Chicago Film Critics Association	December 15, 2021	Best Supporting Actor	Kodi Smit-McPhee	Won	
Chicago Film Critics Association	December 15, 2021	Best Adapted Screenplay	Jane Campion	Won	
Chicago Film Critics Association	December 15, 2021	Best Original Score	Jonny Greenwood	Won	
Chicago Film Critics Association	December 15, 2021	Best Editing	Peter Sciberras	Nominated	
Chicago Film Critics Association	December 15, 2021	Best Cinematography	Ari Wegner	Won	
Critics' Choice Awards	March 13, 2022	Best Picture	The Power of the Dog	Won	
Critics' Choice Awards	March 13, 2022	Best Director	Jane Campion	Won	
Critics' Choice Awards	March 13, 2022	Best Actor	Benedict Cumberbatch	Nominated	
Critics' Choice Awards	March 13, 2022	Best Supporting Actor	Kodi Smit-McPhee	Nominated	
Critics' Choice Awards	March 13, 2022	Best Supporting Actress	Kirsten Dunst	Nominated	
Critics' Choice Awards	March 13, 2022	Best Acting Ensemble	The cast of The Power of the Dog	Nominated	
Critics' Choice Awards	March 13, 2022	Best Adapted Screenplay	Jane Campion	Won	
Critics' Choice Awards	March 13, 2022	Best Cinematography	Ari Wegner	Won	
Critics' Choice Awards	March 13, 2022	Best Editing	Peter Sciberras	Nominated	
Critics' Choice Awards	March 13, 2022	Best Score	Jonny Greenwood	Nominated	
Dallas–Fort Worth Film Critics Association	December 20, 2021	Best Picture	The Power of the Dog	Won	
Dallas–Fort Worth Film Critics Association	December 20, 2021	Best Director	Jane Campion	Won	
Dallas–Fort Worth Film Critics Association	December 20, 2021	Best Actor	Benedict Cumberbatch	Won	
Dallas–Fort Worth Film Critics Association	December 20, 2021	Best Supporting Actor	Jesse Plemons	5th Place	
Dallas–Fort Worth Film Critics Association	December 20, 2021	Best Supporting Actor	Kodi Smit-McPhee	Won	
Dallas–Fort Worth Film Critics Association	December 20, 2021	Best Supporting Actress	Kirsten Dunst	2nd Place	
Dallas–Fort Worth Film Critics Association	December 20, 2021	Best Screenplay	Jane Campion	Won	
Dallas–Fort Worth Film Critics Association	December 20, 2021	Best Cinematography	Ari Wegner	2nd Place	
Dallas–Fort Worth Film Critics Association	December 20, 2021	Best Musical Score	Jonny Greenwood	2nd Place	
Detroit Film Critics Society	December 6, 2021	Best Supporting Actor	Kodi Smit-McPhee	Nominated	
Detroit Film Critics Society	December 6, 2021	Best Supporting Actress	Kirsten Dunst	Nominated	
Detroit Film Critics Society	December 6, 2021	Best Adapted Screenplay	Jane Campion	Won	
Directors Guild of America Awards	March 12, 2022	Outstanding Directing – Feature Film	Jane Campion	Won	
Dorian Awards	March 17, 2022	Best Film	The Power of the Dog	Won	
Dorian Awards	March 17, 2022	Best LGBTQ Film	The Power of the Dog	Nominated	
Dorian Awards	March 17, 2022	Best Director	Jane Campion	Won	
Dorian Awards	March 17, 2022	Best Screenplay	Jane Campion	Won	
Dorian Awards	March 17, 2022	Best Film Performance	Benedict Cumberbatch	Nominated	
Dorian Awards	March 17, 2022	Best Supporting Film Performance	Kirsten Dunst	Nominated	
Dorian Awards	March 17, 2022	Best Supporting Film Performance	Kodi Smitt-McPhee	Nominated	
Dorian Awards	March 17, 2022	Most Visually Striking Film	The Power of the Dog	Nominated	
Dorian Awards	March 17, 2022	Best Film Music	Jonny Greenwood	Nominated	
Florida Film Critics Circle	December 22, 2021	Best Picture	The Power of the Dog	Won	
Florida Film Critics Circle	December 22, 2021	Best Director	Jane Campion	Won	
Florida Film Critics Circle	December 22, 2021	Best Actor	Benedict Cumberbatch	Runner-up	
Florida Film Critics Circle	December 22, 2021	Best Supporting Actor	Kodi Smit-McPhee	Won	
Florida Film Critics Circle	December 22, 2021	Best Supporting Actress	Kirsten Dunst	Nominated	
Florida Film Critics Circle	December 22, 2021	Best Adapted Screenplay	Jane Campion	Won	
Florida Film Critics Circle	December 22, 2021	Best Ensemble	The cast of The Power of the Dog	Nominated	
Florida Film Critics Circle	December 22, 2021	Best Cinematography	Ari Wegner	Won	
Florida Film Critics Circle	December 22, 2021	Best Score	Jonny Greenwood	Runner-up	
Georgia Film Critics Association	January 14, 2022	Best Picture	The Power of the Dog	Nominated	
Georgia Film Critics Association	January 14, 2022	Best Director	Jane Campion	Won	
Georgia Film Critics Association	January 14, 2022	Best Actor	Benedict Cumberbatch	Nominated	
Georgia Film Critics Association	January 14, 2022	Best Supporting Actor	Kodi Smit-McPhee	Nominated	
Georgia Film Critics Association	January 14, 2022	Best Supporting Actress	Kirsten Dunst	Nominated	
Georgia Film Critics Association	January 14, 2022	Best Adapted Screenplay	Jane Campion	Won	
Georgia Film Critics Association	January 14, 2022	Best Cinematography	Ari Wegner	Nominated	
Georgia Film Critics Association	January 14, 2022	Best Original Score	Jonny Greenwood	Nominated	
Georgia Film Critics Association	January 14, 2022	Best Ensemble	The cast of The Power of the Dog	Nominated	
Golden Globe Awards	January 9, 2022	Best Motion Picture – Drama	The Power of the Dog	Won	
Golden Globe Awards	January 9, 2022	Best Actor – Motion Picture Drama	Benedict Cumberbatch	Nominated	
Golden Globe Awards	January 9, 2022	Best Supporting Actor – Motion Picture	Kodi Smit-McPhee	Won	
Golden Globe Awards	January 9, 2022	Best Supporting Actress – Motion Picture	Kirsten Dunst	Nominated	
Golden Globe Awards	January 9, 2022	Best Director	Jane Campion	Won	
Golden Globe Awards	January 9, 2022	Best Screenplay	Jane Campion	Nominated	
Golden Globe Awards	January 9, 2022	Best Original Score	Jonny Greenwood	Nominated	
Golden Reel Awards	March 13, 2022	Outstanding Achievement in Sound Editing – Dialogue and ADR for Feature Film	Leah Katz	Nominated	
Grammy Awards	February 5, 2023	Best Score Soundtrack for Visual Media	Jonny Greenwood	Nominated	
Hollywood Critics Association	February 28, 2022	Best Picture	The Power of the Dog	Nominated	
Hollywood Critics Association	February 28, 2022	Best Director	Jane Campion	Won	
Hollywood Critics Association	February 28, 2022	Best Actor	Benedict Cumberbatch	Nominated	
Hollywood Critics Association	February 28, 2022	Best Adapted Screenplay	Jane Campion	Nominated	
Hollywood Critics Association	February 28, 2022	Best Score	Jonny Greenwood	Nominated	
Hollywood Critics Association	February 28, 2022	Best Cinematography	Ari Wegner	Nominated	
Hollywood Music in Media Awards	November 17, 2021	Best Original Score in a Feature Film	Jonny Greenwood	Nominated	
Houston Film Critics Society	January 19, 2022	Best Picture	The Power of the Dog	Won	
Houston Film Critics Society	January 19, 2022	Best Director	Jane Campion	Won	
Houston Film Critics Society	January 19, 2022	Best Actor	Benedict Cumberbatch	Won	
Houston Film Critics Society	January 19, 2022	Best Supporting Actor	Kodi Smit-McPhee	Won	
Houston Film Critics Society	January 19, 2022	Best Supporting Actress	Kirsten Dunst	Nominated	
Houston Film Critics Society	January 19, 2022	Best Screenplay	Jane Campion	Won	
Houston Film Critics Society	January 19, 2022	Best Original Score	Jonny Greenwood	Nominated	
Houston Film Critics Society	January 19, 2022	Best Cinematography	Ari Wegner	Nominated	
Houston Film Critics Society	January 19, 2022	Best Ensemble	The cast of The Power of the Dog	Nominated	
Location Managers Guild Awards	August 27, 2022	Outstanding Locations in a Period Film	The Power of the Dog	Nominated	
London Film Critics Circle	February 6, 2022	Film of the Year	The Power of the Dog	Won	
London Film Critics Circle	February 6, 2022	Director of the Year	Jane Campion	Won	
London Film Critics Circle	February 6, 2022	Actor of the Year	Benedict Cumberbatch	Won	
London Film Critics Circle	February 6, 2022	Supporting Actor of the Year	Jesse Plemons	Nominated	
London Film Critics Circle	February 6, 2022	Supporting Actor of the Year	Kodi Smit-McPhee	Won	
London Film Critics Circle	February 6, 2022	Supporting Actress of the Year	Kirsten Dunst	Nominated	
London Film Critics Circle	February 6, 2022	Screenwriter of the Year	Jane Campion	Nominated	
London Film Critics Circle	February 6, 2022	British/Irish Actor of the Year	Benedict Cumberbatch	Nominated	
London Film Critics Circle	February 6, 2022	Technical Achievement Award	Jonny Greenwood (music)	Nominated	
Los Angeles Film Critics Association	December 18, 2021	Best Film	The Power of the Dog	Runner-up	
Los Angeles Film Critics Association	December 18, 2021	Best Director	Jane Campion	Won	
Los Angeles Film Critics Association	December 18, 2021	Best Actor	Benedict Cumberbatch	Runner-up	
Los Angeles Film Critics Association	December 18, 2021	Best Supporting Actor	Kodi Smit-McPhee	Won	
Los Angeles Film Critics Association	December 18, 2021	Best Cinematography	Ari Wegner	Won	
Los Angeles Film Critics Association	December 18, 2021	Best Music	Jonny Greenwood	Runner-up	
National Society of Film Critics	January 8, 2022	Best Film	The Power of the Dog	3rd Place	
National Society of Film Critics	January 8, 2022	Best Director	Jane Campion	2nd Place	
National Society of Film Critics	January 8, 2022	Best Actor	Benedict Cumberbatch	2nd Place	
National Society of Film Critics	January 8, 2022	Best Supporting Actor	Kodi Smit-McPhee	3rd Place	
National Society of Film Critics	January 8, 2022	Best Cinematography	Ari Wegner	2nd Place	
New York Film Critics Circle	December 3, 2021	Best Director	Jane Campion	Won	
New York Film Critics Circle	December 3, 2021	Best Actor	Benedict Cumberbatch	Won	
New York Film Critics Circle	December 3, 2021	Best Supporting Actor	Kodi Smit-McPhee	Won	
New York Film Critics Online	December 12, 2021	Best Picture	The Power of the Dog	Won	
New York Film Critics Online	December 12, 2021	Best Director	Jane Campion	Won	
New York Film Critics Online	December 12, 2021	Best Actor	Benedict Cumberbatch	Won	
New York Film Critics Online	December 12, 2021	Best Supporting Actor	Kodi Smit-McPhee	Won	
New York Film Critics Online	December 12, 2021	Best Screenplay	Jane Campion	Won	
New York Film Critics Online	December 12, 2021	Best Cinematography	Ari Wegner	Won	
New York Film Critics Online	December 12, 2021	Best Ensemble	The cast of The Power of the Dog	Won	
Online Film Critics Society	January 24, 2022	Best Picture	The Power of the Dog	Won	
Online Film Critics Society	January 24, 2022	Best Director	Jane Campion	Won	
Online Film Critics Society	January 24, 2022	Best Actor	Benedict Cumberbatch	Won	
Online Film Critics Society	January 24, 2022	Best Supporting Actor	Kodi Smit-McPhee	Won	
Online Film Critics Society	January 24, 2022	Best Supporting Actress	Kirsten Dunst	Won	
Online Film Critics Society	January 24, 2022	Best Adapted Screenplay	Jane Campion	Won	
Online Film Critics Society	January 24, 2022	Best Cinematography	Ari Wegner	Won	
Online Film Critics Society	January 24, 2022	Best Editing	Peter Sciberras	Won	
Online Film Critics Society	January 24, 2022	Best Original Score	Jonny Greenwood	Won	
Producers Guild of America Awards	March 19, 2022	Best Theatrical Motion Picture	Jane Campion, Tanya Seghatchian, Emile Sherman, Iain Canning, and Roger Frappier	Nominated	
San Diego Film Critics Society	January 10, 2022	Best Picture	The Power of the Dog	Won	
San Diego Film Critics Society	January 10, 2022	Best Director	Jane Campion	Won	
San Diego Film Critics Society	January 10, 2022	Best Actor	Benedict Cumberbatch	Nominated	
San Diego Film Critics Society	January 10, 2022	Best Supporting Actor	Kodi Smit-McPhee	Nominated	
San Diego Film Critics Society	January 10, 2022	Best Adapted Screenplay	Jane Campion	Won	
San Diego Film Critics Society	January 10, 2022	Best Cinematography	Ari Wegner	Nominated	
San Diego Film Critics Society	January 10, 2022	Best Production Design	Grant Major	Nominated	
San Diego Film Critics Society	January 10, 2022	Best Sound Design	Dave Whitehead	Runner-up	
San Francisco Bay Area Film Critics Circle	January 10, 2022	Best Picture	The Power of the Dog	Won	
San Francisco Bay Area Film Critics Circle	January 10, 2022	Best Director	Jane Campion	Won	
San Francisco Bay Area Film Critics Circle	January 10, 2022	Best Actor	Benedict Cumberbatch	Won	
San Francisco Bay Area Film Critics Circle	January 10, 2022	Best Supporting Actor	Kodi Smit-McPhee	Won	
San Francisco Bay Area Film Critics Circle	January 10, 2022	Best Supporting Actress	Kirsten Dunst	Won	
San Francisco Bay Area Film Critics Circle	January 10, 2022	Best Adapted Screenplay	Jane Campion	Won	
San Francisco Bay Area Film Critics Circle	January 10, 2022	Best Cinematography	Ari Wegner	Nominated	
San Francisco Bay Area Film Critics Circle	January 10, 2022	Best Film Editing	Peter Sciberras	Won	
San Francisco Bay Area Film Critics Circle	January 10, 2022	Best Original Score	Jonny Greenwood	Won	
Santa Barbara International Film Festival	March 5, 2022	Cinema Vanguard Award	Benedict Cumberbatch	Won	
Santa Barbara International Film Festival	March 5, 2022	Outstanding Directors of the Year	Jane Campion	Won	
Santa Barbara International Film Festival	March 5, 2022	Variety Artisans Award	Peter Sciberras	Won	
Satellite Awards	April 2, 2022	Best Motion Picture – Drama	The Power of the Dog	Nominated	
Satellite Awards	April 2, 2022	Best Director	Jane Campion	Won	
Satellite Awards	April 2, 2022	Best Actor in a Motion Picture – Drama	Benedict Cumberbatch	Won	
Satellite Awards	April 2, 2022	Best Supporting Actor	Kodi Smit-McPhee	Won	
Satellite Awards	April 2, 2022	Best Supporting Actress	Kirsten Dunst	Won	
Satellite Awards	April 2, 2022	Best Adapted Screenplay	Jane Campion	Nominated	
Satellite Awards	April 2, 2022	Best Cinematography	Ari Wegner	Nominated	
Satellite Awards	April 2, 2022	Best Film Editing	Peter Sciberras	Nominated	
Satellite Awards	April 2, 2022	Best Art Direction and Production Design	Grant Major and Amber Richards	Nominated	
Satellite Awards	April 2, 2022	Best Costume Design	Kirsty Cameron	Nominated	
Satellite Awards	April 2, 2022	Best Original Score	Jonny Greenwood	Nominated	
Satellite Awards	April 2, 2022	Best Sound (Editing and Mixing)	Robert Mackenzie, Richard Flynn, Leah Katz, Tara Webb and Dave Whitehead	Nominated	
Satellite Awards	April 2, 2022	Best Ensemble – Motion Picture	The cast of The Power of the Dog	Won	
Screen Actors Guild Awards	February 27, 2022	Outstanding Performance by a Male Actor in a Leading Role	Benedict Cumberbatch	Nominated	
Screen Actors Guild Awards	February 27, 2022	Outstanding Performance by a Male Actor in a Supporting Role	Kodi Smit-McPhee	Nominated	
Screen Actors Guild Awards	February 27, 2022	Outstanding Performance by a Female Actor in a Supporting Role	Kirsten Dunst	Nominated	
Seattle Film Critics Society	January 17, 2022	Best Picture	The Power of the Dog	Nominated	
Seattle Film Critics Society	January 17, 2022	Best Director	Jane Campion	Nominated	
Seattle Film Critics Society	January 17, 2022	Best Actor in a Leading Role	Benedict Cumberbatch	Nominated	
Seattle Film Critics Society	January 17, 2022	Best Actor in a Supporting Role	Kodi Smit-McPhee	Won	
Seattle Film Critics Society	January 17, 2022	Best Actress in a Supporting Role	Kirsten Dunst	Nominated	
Seattle Film Critics Society	January 17, 2022	Best Ensemble Cast	The cast of The Power of the Dog	Nominated	
Seattle Film Critics Society	January 17, 2022	Best Screenplay	Jane Campion	Nominated	
Seattle Film Critics Society	January 17, 2022	Best Cinematography	Ari Wegner	Nominated	
Seattle Film Critics Society	January 17, 2022	Best Film Editing	Peter Sciberras	Nominated	
Seattle Film Critics Society	January 17, 2022	Best Original Score	Jonny Greenwood	Nominated	
Seattle Film Critics Society	January 17, 2022	Villain of the Year	Phil Burbank – portrayed by Benedict Cumberbatch	Won	
Set Decorators Society of America Awards	February 22, 2022	Best Achievement in Décor/Design of a Period Feature Film	Amber Richards, Grant Major	Nominated	
St. Louis Film Critics Association	December 19, 2021	Best Film	The Power of the Dog	Nominated	
St. Louis Film Critics Association	December 19, 2021	Best Director	Jane Campion	Won	
St. Louis Film Critics Association	December 19, 2021	Best Actor	Benedict Cumberbatch	Nominated	
St. Louis Film Critics Association	December 19, 2021	Best Supporting Actor	Kodi Smit-McPhee	Won	
St. Louis Film Critics Association	December 19, 2021	Best Supporting Actress	Kirsten Dunst	Nominated	
St. Louis Film Critics Association	December 19, 2021	Best Adapted Screenplay	Jane Campion	Won	
St. Louis Film Critics Association	December 19, 2021	Best Cinematography	Ari Wegner	Won	
St. Louis Film Critics Association	December 19, 2021	Best Score	Jonny Greenwood	Nominated	
Toronto Film Critics Association	January 16, 2022	Best Film	The Power of the Dog	Runner-up	
Toronto Film Critics Association	January 16, 2022	Best Director	Jane Campion	Won	
Toronto Film Critics Association	January 16, 2022	Best Actor	Benedict Cumberbatch	Runner-up	
Toronto Film Critics Association	January 16, 2022	Best Supporting Actor	Kodi Smit-McPhee	Runner-up	
Toronto Film Critics Association	January 16, 2022	Best Supporting Actress	Kirsten Dunst	Runner-up	
Toronto Film Critics Association	January 16, 2022	Best Screenplay	Jane Campion	Runner-up	
Toronto International Film Festival	September 18, 2021	People's Choice Award	The Power of the Dog	2nd Runner-up	
USC Scripter Awards	February 26, 2022	Best Adapted Screenplay - Film	Jane Campion	Nominated	
Vancouver Film Critics Circle	March 7, 2022	Best Film	The Power of the Dog	Won	
Vancouver Film Critics Circle	March 7, 2022	Best Director	Jane Campion	Nominated	
Vancouver Film Critics Circle	March 7, 2022	Best Supporting Actor	Jesse Plemons	Nominated	
Vancouver Film Critics Circle	March 7, 2022	Best Supporting Actor	Kodi Smit-McPhee	Nominated	
Vancouver Film Critics Circle	March 7, 2022	Best Supporting Actress	Kirsten Dunst	Nominated	
Venice Film Festival	September 11, 2021	Golden Lion	Jane Campion	Nominated	
Venice Film Festival	September 11, 2021	Silver Lion for Best Direction	Jane Campion	Won	
Washington D.C. Area Film Critics Association	December 6, 2021	Best Film	The Power of the Dog	Nominated	
Washington D.C. Area Film Critics Association	December 6, 2021	Best Director	Jane Campion	Won	
Washington D.C. Area Film Critics Association	December 6, 2021	Best Actor	Benedict Cumberbatch	Nominated	
Washington D.C. Area Film Critics Association	December 6, 2021	Best Supporting Actor	Jesse Plemons	Nominated	
Washington D.C. Area Film Critics Association	December 6, 2021	Best Supporting Actor	Kodi Smit-McPhee	Won	
Washington D.C. Area Film Critics Association	December 6, 2021	Best Supporting Actress	Kirsten Dunst	Nominated	
Washington D.C. Area Film Critics Association	December 6, 2021	Best Adapted Screenplay	Jane Campion	Won	
Washington D.C. Area Film Critics Association	December 6, 2021	Best Cinematography	Ari Wegner	Nominated	
Washington D.C. Area Film Critics Association	December 6, 2021	Best Editing	Peter Sciberras	Nominated	
Washington D.C. Area Film Critics Association	December 6, 2021	Best Score	Jonny Greenwood	Nominated	
Washington D.C. Area Film Critics Association	December 6, 2021	Best Ensemble	The cast of The Power of the Dog	Nominated	
Women Film Critics Circle	December 13, 2021	Best Movie By a Woman	The Power of the Dog	Won	
Women Film Critics Circle	December 13, 2021	Best Woman Storyteller	Jane Campion	Won	
