= List of awards and nominations received by Jane Campion =

Jane Campion awards and nominations
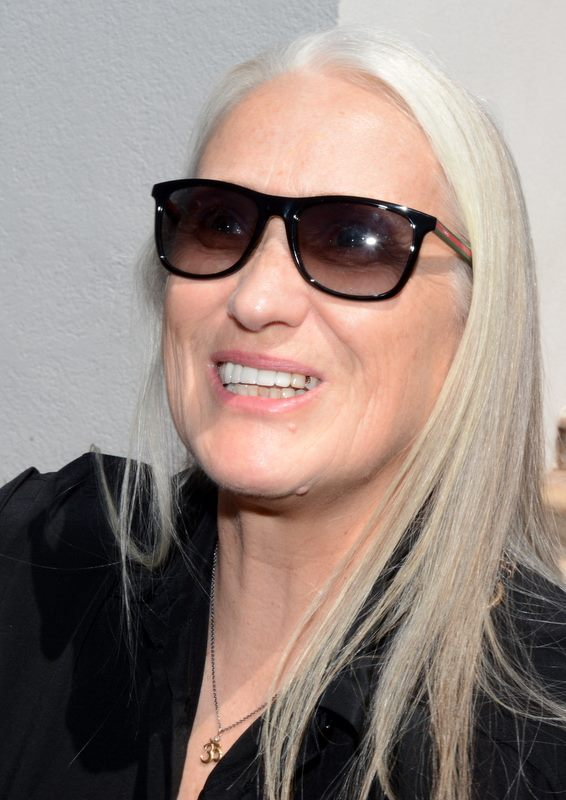
- Campion at the 2014 Cannes Film Festival
Awards and nominations
Award	Wins	Nominations
Academy Awards	2	5
AACTA Awards	8	15
BAFTA Film Awards	3	6
BAFTA Television Awards	0	1
Cannes Film Festival	2	4
Critics' Choice Awards	3	3
Golden Globe Awards	2	6
Primetime Emmy Awards	0	3
Satellite Awards	0	3
Venice Film Festival	7	11

Totals (Note: Certain award groups do not simply award one winner. They acknowledge several different recipients, have runners-up, and have third place. Since this is a specific recognition and is different from losing an award, runner-up mentions are considered wins in this award tally. For simplification and to avoid errors, each award in this list has been presumed to have had a prior nomination.)
- Wins: 101
- Nominations: 172

This is a list of awards and nominations received by New Zealand director, screenwriter and producer Jane Campion.

Active in the cinematographic field since the 1980s, Campion wrote her short film promo, Peel, in 1984, which was recognised at the Cannes Film Festival with the Short Film Palme d'Or. She then directed her first film Sweetie (1989), gaining support from Australian critics who awarded her the AACTA Awards for Best Screenplay and with the Byron Kennedy Award for her contribution to the renewal of the Australian film industry.

In 1990 she presented her full-length film An Angel at My Table at the Venice Film Festival, being honoured with five awards, including the Grand Jury Prize. In 1993, she wrote, directed and produced the internationally critically acclaimed film The Piano, which earned Campion the Academy Award for Best Original Screenplay and made her the second woman in Academy Awards history to be nominated for Best Director. Thanks to the film also became the first female filmmaker to receive the Palme d'Or at the Cannes Film Festival.

After producing and directing Bright Star, which was nominated for two Satellite Awards, Campion directed and produced the television series Top of the Lake, earning three Primetime Emmy Awards nominations in 2013.

In 2021, Campion wrote, directed and produced the film The Power of the Dog. It became one of the most critically acclaimed films of that year for its direction, screenplay and ensemble cast, winning the Golden Globe Award for Best Motion Picture – Drama and Best Director, leading the 94th Academy Awards nominations, becoming the first woman to receive multiple Best Director nominations. Campion also won the Academy Award for Best Director, becoming the third female director to win it in the history of the awards ceremony.

== Major associations ==
=== Academy Awards ===
The Academy Awards, popularly known as the Oscars, are awards for artistic and technical merit in the film industry, given annually by the Academy of Motion Picture Arts and Sciences.

Year	Category	Nominated work	Result	Ref.
1994	Best Director	The Piano	Nominated	
1994	Best Original Screenplay	The Piano	Won	
2022	Best Picture	The Power of the Dog	Nominated	
2022	Best Director	The Power of the Dog	Won	
2022	Best Adapted Screenplay	The Power of the Dog	Nominated	

=== BAFTA Awards ===
The BAFTA Awards are presented in an annual award show hosted by the British Academy of Film and Television Arts to honour the best British and international contributions to film, TV shows and video-games.

Year	Category	Nominated work	Result	Ref.
Film Awards
1994	Best Film	The Piano	Nominated	
1994	Best Director	The Piano	Nominated	
1994	Best Original Screenplay	The Piano	Nominated	
2022	Best Film	The Power of the Dog	Won	
2022	Best Director	The Power of the Dog	Won	
2022	Best Adapted Screenplay	The Power of the Dog	Nominated	
Television Awards
2018	Best Director: Fiction	Top of the Lake	Nominated	

=== Golden Globe Awards ===
The Golden Globe Awards are accolades bestowed by the members of the Hollywood Foreign Press Association, recognizing excellence in both American and international film and television.

Year	Category	Nominated work	Result	Ref.
1994	Best Motion Picture – Drama	The Piano	Nominated	
1994	Best Director	The Piano	Nominated	
1994	Best Screenplay	The Piano	Nominated	
2022	Best Motion Picture – Drama	The Power of the Dog	Won	
2022	Best Director	The Power of the Dog	Won	
2022	Best Screenplay	The Power of the Dog	Nominated	

=== Primetime Emmy Awards ===
The Primetime Emmy Awards are bestowed by the Academy of Television Arts & Sciences (ATAS) in recognition of excellence in American primetime television programming-

Year	Category	Nominated work	Result	Ref.
2013	Outstanding Miniseries or Movie	Top of the Lake	Nominated	
2013	Outstanding Directing for a Miniseries, Movie or a Dramatic Special	Top of the Lake	Nominated	
2013	Outstanding Writing for a Miniseries, Movie or a Dramatic Special	Top of the Lake	Nominated	

== Other awards and nominations ==
=== AACTA Awards ===
The Australian Academy of Cinema and Television Arts Awards, called Australian Film Institute Awards or AFI Awards from 1985 to 2010, are presented annually by the Australian Academy of Cinema and Television Arts (AACTA).

Year	Category	Nominated work	Result	Ref.
1983	Best Short Fiction Film	PEEL	Nominated	
1983	Best Editing	PEEL	Nominated	
1989	Best Original Screenplay	Sweetie	Won	
1989	Byron Kennedy Award		Won	
1993	Best Film	The Piano	Won	
1993	Best Direction	The Piano	Won	
1993	Best Original Screenplay	The Piano	Won	
2010	Best Direction	Bright Star	Nominated	
2010	Best Original Screenplay	Bright Star	Nominated	
2013	Best Telefeature, Mini Series or Short Run Series	Top of the Lake	Won	
2017	Best Television Drama Series	Top of the Lake: China Girl	Won	
2017	Best Direction in a Drama or Comedy	Top of the Lake: China Girl	Nominated	
AACTA International Awards
2022	Best Film	The Power of the Dog	Won	
2022	Best Direction	The Power of the Dog	Nominated	
2022	Best Screenplay	The Power of the Dog	Nominated	

=== Art Directors Guild Awards ===
Year	Work	Category	Result	Ref.
2022	Herself	Cinematic Imagery Award	Won	

=== The Arts Foundation Te Tumu Toi ===
In December 2022 Campion was a recipient of the New Zealand Arts Icon Award Whakamana Hiranga, which makes her one of twenty current living cultural icons.

=== British Independent Film Awards ===
The British Independent Film Awards (BIFA) is an organisation that celebrates, supports and promotes British independent cinema and filmmaking talent in United Kingdom, Australia and New Zealand.

Year	Work	Category	Result	Ref.
2009	Bright Star	Best Director	Nominated	

=== British Screenwriters' Awards ===
Year	Work	Category	Result	Ref.
2018	Top of the Lake	Best Crime Writing on Television	Nominated	

=== Broadcasting Press Guild Awards ===
The Broadcasting Press Guild (BPG) is a British association of journalists dedicated to the topic of general media issues.

Year	Work	Category	Result	Ref.
2014	Top of the Lake	Best Drama Series	Nominated	
2014	Top of the Lake	Best Writer	Nominated	

=== Cannes Film Festival ===
The Cannes Film Festival, is an annual film festival held in Cannes, France, which previews new films of all genres, including documentaries, from all around the world.

Year	Work	Category	Result	Ref.
1986	Peel	Short Film Palme d'Or	Won	
1989	Sweetie	Palme d'Or	Nominated	
1993	The Piano	Palme d'Or	Won	
2009	Bright Star	Palme d'Or	Nominated	

=== César Awards ===
The César Awards is the national film award of France, bestowed by the Académie des Arts et Techniques du Cinéma.

Year	Work	Category	Result	Ref.
1993	The Piano	Best Foreign Film	Won	
2011	Bright Star	Best Foreign Film	Nominated	

=== Critics' Choice Awards ===
The Critics' Choice Movie Awards or Broadcast Film Critics Association Award is an awards show presented annually by the American-Canadian Critics Choice Association (CCA) to honor the finest in cinematic achievement.

Year	Work	Category	Result	Ref.
2022	The Power of the Dog	Best Picture	Won	
2022	The Power of the Dog	Best Director	Won	
2022	The Power of the Dog	Best Adapted Screenplay	Won	

=== Directors Guild of America Awards ===
The Directors Guild of America Awards are issued annually by the Directors Guild of America.

Year	Work	Category	Result	Ref.
1994	The Piano	Outstanding Directing – Feature Film	Nominated	
2022	The Power of the Dog	Outstanding Directing – Feature Film	Won	

=== Gold Derby Film Awards ===
The Gold Derby Film Awards are issued annually by Gold Derby to recognized the best in film industry.

Year	Work	Category	Result	Ref.
2022	The Power of the Dog	Best Picture	Won	
2022	The Power of the Dog	Best Director	Won	
2022	The Power of the Dog	Best Adapted Screenplay	Nominated	

=== Independent Spirit Awards ===
The Independent Spirit Awards are awards dedicated to excellence in the independent film industry, produced by Film Independent, a not-for-profit arts organization that used to produce the LA Film Festival.

Year	Work	Category	Result	Ref.
1991	Sweetie	Best International Film	Won	
1992	An Angel at My Table	Best International Film	Won	
1994	The Piano	Best International Film	Won	

=== Producers Guild of America Awards ===
The Producers Guild of America Awards are issued annually by the Producers Guild of America.

Year	Work	Category	Result	Ref.
1994	The Piano	Best Theatrical Motion Picture	Nominated	
1994	The Piano	Most Promising Producer in Theatrical Motion Pictures	Won	
2022	The Power of the Dog	Best Theatrical Motion Picture	Nominated	

=== Satellite Awards ===
The Satellite Awards are annual awards given by the International Press Academy that are commonly noted in entertainment industry journals.

Year	Work	Category	Result	Ref.
2009	Bright Star	Best Director	Nominated	
2009	Bright Star	Best Screenplay – Original	Nominated	
2022	The Power of the Dog	Best Motion Picture – Drama	Nominated	
2022	The Power of the Dog	Best Director	Won	
2022	The Power of the Dog	Best Adapted Screenplay	Nominated	

=== Venice Film Festival ===
The Venice Film Festival is part of the Venice Biennale and is the world's oldest film festival.

Year	Work	Category	Result	Ref.
1990	An Angel at My Table	Golden Lion	Nominated	
1990	An Angel at My Table	Grand Jury Prize	Won	
1990	An Angel at My Table	OCIC Award	Won	
1990	An Angel at My Table	Little Golden Lion	Won	
1990	An Angel at My Table	Elvira Notari Prize	Won	
1990	An Angel at My Table	Bastone Bianco Award	Won	
1996	The Portrait of a Lady	Pasinetti Award for Best Film	Nominated	
1999	Holy Smoke	Golden Lion	Nominated	
1999	Holy Smoke	Elvira Notari Prize	Won	
2021	The Power of the Dog	Golden Lion	Nominated	
2021	The Power of the Dog	Silver Lion for Best Direction	Won	

=== Writers Guild of America Awards ===
The Writers Guild of America Awards are issued annually by the Writers Guild of America.

Year	Work	Category	Result	Ref.
1994	The Piano	Best Screenplay – Written Directly for the Screen	Won	

== Critics awards ==
Association	Year	Work	Category	Result	Ref.
Alliance of Women Film Journalists	2009	Best Woman Director	Bright Star	Nominated	
Alliance of Women Film Journalists	2009	Best Woman Screenwriter	Bright Star	Won	
Alliance of Women Film Journalists	2009	Women's Image Award	Bright Star	Nominated	
Alliance of Women Film Journalists	2009	Best Woman in the Film Industry	Bright Star	Nominated	
Alliance of Women Film Journalists	2022	Best Film	The Power of the Dog	Won	
Alliance of Women Film Journalists	2022	Best Director	The Power of the Dog	Won	
Alliance of Women Film Journalists	2022	Best Screenplay, Adapted	The Power of the Dog	Won	
Alliance of Women Film Journalists	2022	Best Woman Director	The Power of the Dog	Won	
Alliance of Women Film Journalists	2022	Best Woman Screenwriter	The Power of the Dog	Won	
Argentine Film Critics Association	1993	Best Foreign Film	The Piano	Won	
Austin Film Critics Association	2022	Best Film	The Power of the Dog	Won	
Austin Film Critics Association	2022	Best Director	The Power of the Dog	Won	
Austin Film Critics Association	2022	Best Adapted Screenplay	The Power of the Dog	Nominated	
Belgian Film Critics Association	2022	Grand Prix	The Power of the Dog	Won	
Black Film Critics Circle	2021	Best Adapted Screenplay	The Power of the Dog	Won	
Bodil Awards	1994	Best Non-American Film	The Piano	Won	
Boston Society of Film Critics	2021	Best English Language Film	The Power of the Dog	Won	
Chicago Film Critics Association	1993	Best Director	The Piano	Nominated	
Chicago Film Critics Association	1993	Best Screenplay	The Piano	Won	
Chicago Film Critics Association	2021	Best Film	The Power of the Dog	Won	
Chicago Film Critics Association	2021	Best Director	The Power of the Dog	Won	
Chicago Film Critics Association	2021	Best Adapted Screenplay	The Power of the Dog	Won	
Dallas–Fort Worth Film Critics Association	1993	Best Picture	The Piano	Nominated	
Dallas–Fort Worth Film Critics Association	1993	Best Director	The Piano	Nominated	
Dallas–Fort Worth Film Critics Association	2021	Best Picture	The Power of the Dog	Won	
Dallas–Fort Worth Film Critics Association	2021	Best Director	The Power of the Dog	Won	
Dallas–Fort Worth Film Critics Association	2021	Best Screenplay	The Power of the Dog	Won	
Detroit Film Critics Society	2021	Best Adapted Screenplay	The Power of the Dog	Won	
Film Critics Circle of Australia Awards	1993	Best Director	The Piano	Won	
Film Critics Circle of Australia Awards	1993	Best Screenplay	The Piano	Won	
Florida Film Critics Circle	2021	Best Picture	The Power of the Dog	Won	
Florida Film Critics Circle	2021	Best Director	The Power of the Dog	Won	
Florida Film Critics Circle	2021	Best Adapted Screenplay	The Power of the Dog	Won	
Georgia Film Critics Association	2022	Best Picture	The Power of the Dog	Nominated	
Georgia Film Critics Association	2022	Best Director	The Power of the Dog	Won	
Georgia Film Critics Association	2022	Best Adapted Screenplay	The Power of the Dog	Won	
Hawaii Film Critics Society	2022	Best Picture	The Power of the Dog	Nominated	
Hawaii Film Critics Society	2022	Best Director	The Power of the Dog	Nominated	
Hawaii Film Critics Society	2022	Best Art Direction	The Power of the Dog	Nominated	
Hawaii Film Critics Society	2022	Best Adapted Screenplay	The Power of the Dog	Nominated	
Hollywood Critics Association	2022	Best Picture	The Power of the Dog	Nominated	
Hollywood Critics Association	2022	Best Director	The Power of the Dog	Won	
Hollywood Critics Association	2022	Best Adapted Screenplay	The Power of the Dog	Nominated	
Houston Film Critics Society	2022	Best Picture	The Power of the Dog	Won	
Houston Film Critics Society	2022	Best Director	The Power of the Dog	Won	
Houston Film Critics Society	2022	Best Adapted Screenplay	The Power of the Dog	Won	
London Film Critics Circle	1993	Film of the Year	The Piano	Won	
London Film Critics Circle	2021	Film of the Year	The Power of the Dog	Won	
London Film Critics Circle	2021	Director of the Year	The Power of the Dog	Won	
London Film Critics Circle	2021	Screenwriter of the Year	The Power of the Dog	Nominated	
Los Angeles Film Critics Association	1990	New Generation Award	Herself	Won	
Los Angeles Film Critics Association	1993	Best Director	The Piano	Won	
Los Angeles Film Critics Association	1993	Best Screenplay	The Piano	Won	
Los Angeles Film Critics Association	2021	Best Film	The Power of the Dog	Runner-up	
Los Angeles Film Critics Association	2021	Best Director	The Power of the Dog	Won	
Melbourne International Film Festival	2017	Best Narrative Feature	Top of the Lake	Nominated	
Mill Valley Film Festival	2021	Mind the Gap – Best Innovation	Herself	Won	
Nastro d'Argento	1994	Best Foreign Director	The Piano	Won	
National Society of Film Critics	1993	Best Film	The Piano	Runner-up	
National Society of Film Critics	1993	Best Director	The Piano	Runner-up	
National Society of Film Critics	1993	Best Screenplay	The Piano	Won	
New York Film Critics Circle	1989	Best New Director	Sweetie	Nominated	
New York Film Critics Circle	1993	Best Director	The Piano	Won	
New York Film Critics Circle	1993	Best Screenplay	The Piano	Won	
New York Film Critics Circle	2021	Best Director	The Power of the Dog	Won	
National Society of Film Critics	1990	Best Director	Sweetie	Nominated	
National Society of Film Critics	1993	Best Director	The Piano	Nominated	
National Society of Film Critics	1993	Best Screenplay	The Piano	Won	
San Diego Film Critics Society	2022	Best Film	The Power of the Dog	Won	
San Diego Film Critics Society	2022	Best Director	The Power of the Dog	Won	
San Diego Film Critics Society	2022	Best Adapted Screenplay	The Power of the Dog	Won	
San Francisco Bay Area Film Critics Circle	2022	Best Film	The Power of the Dog	Won	
San Francisco Bay Area Film Critics Circle	2022	Best Director	The Power of the Dog	Won	
San Francisco Bay Area Film Critics Circle	2022	Best Adapted Screenplay	The Power of the Dog	Won	
Southeastern Film Critics Association	1993	Best Director	The Piano	Won	
Southeastern Film Critics Association	2021	Best Film	The Power of the Dog	Won	
Southeastern Film Critics Association	2021	Best Director	The Power of the Dog	Won	
Southeastern Film Critics Association	2021	Best Adapted Screenplay	The Power of the Dog	Won	
St. Louis Film Critics Association	2021	Best Film	The Power of the Dog	Nominated	
St. Louis Film Critics Association	2021	Best Director	The Power of the Dog	Won	
Taormina Film Fest	2000	Taormina Arte Award	Herself	Won	
Toronto Film Critics Association	2022	Best Film	The Power of the Dog	Runner-up	
Toronto Film Critics Association	2022	Best Director	The Power of the Dog	Won	
Toronto Film Critics Association	2022	Best Adapted Screenplay	The Power of the Dog	Runner-up	
Utah Film Critics Association	2021	Best Director	The Power of the Dog	Won	
Valladolid International Film Festival	1990	Golden Spike Award	An Angel at My Table	Nominated	
Valladolid International Film Festival	1990	Silver Spike Award	An Angel at My Table	Won	
Valladolid International Film Festival	2003	Golden Spike Award	In the Cut	Nominated	
Washington D.C. Area Film Critics Association	2021	Best Film	The Power of the Dog	Nominated	
Washington D.C. Area Film Critics Association	2021	Best Director	The Power of the Dog	Won	
Washington D.C. Area Film Critics Association	2021	Best Adapted Screenplay	The Power of the Dog	Won	
Women Film Critics Circle	2009	Best Movie By a Woman	Bright Star	Nominated	
Women Film Critics Circle	2021	Best Movie By a Woman	The Power of the Dog	Won	
Women Film Critics Circle	2021	Best Woman Storyteller	The Power of the Dog	Won	

== Awards received by Campion's movies ==
Year	Film	Academy Awards		BAFTA Awards		Golden Globe Awards	
Year	Film	Nominations	Wins	Nominations	Wins	Nominations	Wins
1993	The Piano	8	3	10	3	6	1
1996	The Portrait of a Lady	2				1	
2009	Bright Star	1		1			
2021	The Power of the Dog	12	1	7	2	7	3
Total		23	4	18	5	14	4

=== Directed Academy Award performances ===
Year	Performer	Film	Result
Academy Award for Best Actor
2022	Benedict Cumberbatch	The Power of the Dog	Nominated
Academy Award for Best Actress
1994	Holly Hunter	The Piano	Won
Academy Award for Best Supporting Actor
2022	Jesse Plemons	The Power of the Dog	Nominated
2022	Kodi Smit-McPhee	The Power of the Dog	Nominated
Academy Award for Best Supporting Actress
1994	Anna Paquin	The Piano	Won
1997	Barbara Hershey	The Portrait of a Lady	Nominated
2022	Kirsten Dunst	The Power of the Dog	Nominated
