= The Power of the Dog (film) =

2021 film by Jane Campion

- Release poster
- Directed by: Jane Campion
- Screenplay by: Jane Campion
- Based on: The Power of the Dog by Thomas Savage
- Produced by: Jane Campion; Tanya Seghatchian; Emile Sherman; Iain Canning; Roger Frappier
- Starring: Benedict Cumberbatch; Kirsten Dunst; Jesse Plemons; Kodi Smit-McPhee
- Cinematography: Ari Wegner
- Edited by: Peter Sciberras
- Music by: Jonny Greenwood
- Production companies: New Zealand Film Commission; BBC Film; Max Films; See-Saw Films; Cross City Films; Bad Girl Creek; Brightstar
- Distributed by: Netflix (international); Transmission Films (New Zealand and Australia)
- Release dates: 2 September 2021 (Venice); 11 November 2021 (New Zealand and Australia)
- Running time: 126 minutes
- Countries: New Zealand; Australia; United Kingdom; United States; Canada
- Language: English
- Budget: $35–39 million
- Box office: $417,022

The Power of the Dog is a 2021 Western psychological drama film written, co-produced and directed by Jane Campion. It is based on Thomas Savage's 1967 novel. The film stars Benedict Cumberbatch, Kirsten Dunst, Jesse Plemons, and Kodi Smit-McPhee. Set in Montana in 1925 and filmed mostly in rural areas in New Zealand’s Otago Region, the film is an international co-production between New Zealand, Australia, the United Kingdom, the United States, and Canada.

The Power of the Dog premiered at the 78th Venice International Film Festival on 2 September 2021, where Campion won the Silver Lion for Best Direction. The film had a limited theatrical release in November 2021, and was released to stream worldwide on Netflix on 1 December 2021. The Power of the Dog was acclaimed by critics, who praised Campion's direction and screenplay, and the cinematography, score, and four lead performances.

It was widely regarded as one of the best films of 2021, appearing on many top-ten lists, and received many accolades, including a leading 12 nominations at the 94th Academy Awards, among them Best Picture, Best Actor for Cumberbatch, Best Supporting Actor for both Plemons and Smit-McPhee, and Best Supporting Actress for Dunst. Campion won Best Director, making the film the first to win only in that category since The Graduate (1967); its 11 losses tied the record for most in Oscars history, until it was surpassed by Sinners, with 12 losses. It was named one of the best films of 2021 by the American Film Institute, and received seven nominations at the 79th Golden Globe Awards, winning Best Motion Picture – Drama, Best Supporting Actor – Motion Picture for Smit-McPhee, and Best Director. It received ten nominations at the 27th Critics' Choice Awards, winning four, including Best Picture, and received eight nominations at the 75th British Academy Film Awards, winning Best Direction and Best Film. It has since been cited as among the best films of the 2020s and of the 21st century.

== Plot ==
In 1925 Montana, wealthy ranch-owning brothers Phil and George Burbank meet widow and inn owner Rose Gordon during a cattle drive. The kindhearted George is quickly taken with Rose, but the coarse and volatile Phil dislikes her, believing she only wants George's money. Phil also belittles her teenage son Peter, deriding him as weak and effeminate.

George and Rose marry and she moves into the Burbank ranch house while Peter attends medical school. George organizes a dinner party with his parents and the governor and pressures Rose into a piano performance. George reveals that Phil was a brilliant Classics student at Yale, in contrast to his rough nature. Shaken by Phil's earlier belittlement of her piano playing, Rose is unable to perform. Humiliated and upset by Phil's behavior, Rose starts drinking, becoming an alcoholic by the time Peter arrives home for a break from school. Phil and his men taunt Peter, and he isolates himself in his room, where he dissects a rabbit he has caught.

In a glade away from the mansion, Phil masturbates with a delicate scarf belonging to his late mentor, Bronco Henry. Peter enters a bivouac in the glade and finds a stash of Bronco Henry's homoerotic magazines. He observes Phil bathing in a pond with Bronco's scarf around his neck before Phil notices and chases him away. Later, in front of his men, Rose, and George, Phil makes amends with Peter, offering to plait him a lasso from rawhide before he returns to school. He teaches Peter to ride a horse.

Peter heads out on his own one day, finds a dead cow, and, after carefully putting on rubber surgeon's gloves he had brought in his backpack, cuts off a piece of its hide. Phil and Peter ride into the hills together. While trying to catch a rabbit hiding in a pile of wood posts, Phil reopens a large gash in his hand but declines Peter's offer to dress the wound. Peter tells Phil about finding the body of his alcoholic father, who had hanged himself, and having to cut him down.

Rose's alcoholism worsens as Peter and Phil spend more time together. Upon learning about Phil's policy of burning unwanted hides, Rose defiantly trades them to a local Shoshone merchant for a pair of leather gloves. Immediately after this transaction, she collapses on her way back to the house. Upon discovering this, Phil is infuriated. George says she is unwell. Peter pacifies Phil by offering him strips from the hide he cut, not mentioning its origin. Phil is touched by Peter's gesture and holds him close to his face. The pair spend the night in the barn finishing the rope. Blood flows from Phil's open wound as he swirls the hide in the solution used to soften it. Peter asks Phil about his relationship with Bronco Henry. Phil says Bronco Henry had once saved his life when they were caught in a freezing storm in the mountains by keeping him warm with his body. Peter asks if they were naked, but Phil does not answer. They later share a cigarette, with Peter passing it to Phil while holding it in his fingers.

The next morning, George finds Phil sick in bed, his wound now severely infected. A delirious Phil looks for Peter to give him the finished lasso, but George takes him to the doctor. Phil dies. Later, George picks out a coffin for Phil while his body is prepared for burial. At the funeral, the doctor tells George that Phil most likely died of anthrax. This puzzles George, as Phil was always careful to avoid diseased cattle.

Peter, who skipped Phil's funeral, opens a Book of Common Prayer to a passage on burial rites and reads Psalm 22 before stowing the finished lasso under his bed with carefully gloved hands. As Peter watches George and a now-sober Rose return home and embrace, he turns away and smiles.

== Cast ==
- Benedict Cumberbatch as Phil Burbank
- Kirsten Dunst as Rose Gordon
- Jesse Plemons as George Burbank
- Kodi Smit-McPhee as Peter Gordon
- Thomasin McKenzie as Lola
- Genevieve Lemon as Mrs. Lewis
- Keith Carradine as Governor Edward
- Frances Conroy as Old Lady Burbank
- Peter Carroll as "Old Gent" Burbank
- Alison Bruce as Governor Edward's Wife
- Alistair Sewell as Jock
- Cohen Holloway as Bobby
- Sean Keenan as Sven
- Adam Beach as Edward Nappo
- Maeson Stone Skuggedal as Edward Nappo's son
- Alice Englert as Buster

== Production ==
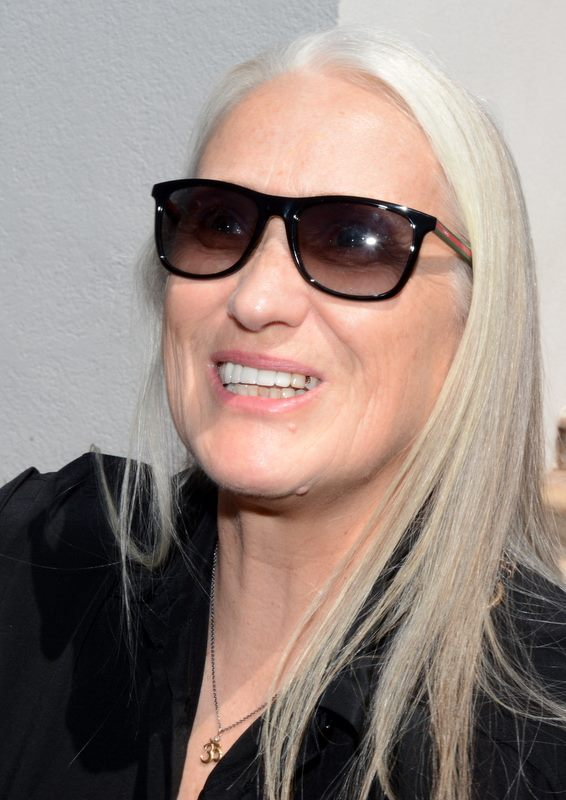
Director Jane Campion, who received an Oscar and a Silver Lion award for her direction.

=== Background ===
In early 2017, writer-director Jane Campion, having just finished filming the second season of Top of the Lake, received a copy of Thomas Savage's 1967 novel The Power of the Dog from her stepmother, Judith. Enthralled by the book, Campion began hunting for its film rights. She and producer Tanya Seghatchian obtained the rights from Canadian producer Roger Frappier after meeting with him at the 2017 Cannes Film Festival. According to Campion, the novel had been optioned at least five times but never adapted. Paul Newman was among those who had tried to adapt it.

While working on the script, Campion maintained correspondence with author Annie Proulx, who wrote the afterword to a 2001 edition of Savage's novel. After completing her first draft, Campion visited Savage's ranch in Montana, met with members of his family (Savage died in 2003), and consulted with an expert on Savage at the University of Montana Western in Dillon. She was unable to film in Montana due to budget concerns, and opted to shoot in her native New Zealand instead. Cinematographer Ari Wegner and production designer Grant Major found an ideal location in Central Otago on New Zealand's South Island, months before the film's early 2020 start date.

=== Development and casting ===
In May 2019 it was announced that Campion was to write and direct the film with Benedict Cumberbatch and Elisabeth Moss cast to star. Paul Dano entered negotiations to join the film in September. He was confirmed to star the next month, with Kirsten Dunst cast to replace Moss. But by November, Dano also dropped out due to scheduling conflicts with The Batman. Jesse Plemons, who had been offered the role before Dano, was cast to replace him. In February 2020, Thomasin McKenzie, Kodi Smit-McPhee, Frances Conroy, Keith Carradine, Peter Carroll, and Adam Beach were confirmed to be cast in the film.

Campion had Cumberbatch in mind for the role of Phil Burbank. He first caught Campion's attention in the 2012–13 BBC drama Parade's End. To prepare for the role, Cumberbatch researched the Lewis and Clark Expedition and worked for a time on a Montana cattle ranch near Glacier National Park. He attended a three-week boot camp to learn horse-riding, rope-throwing, castrating bulls, and playing the banjo.

=== Filming ===
Filming began in New Zealand in January 2020 in the Maniototo in Central Otago, and also took place in the coastal Otago city of Dunedin and the town of Oamaru. Production was halted in March by the COVID-19 pandemic. After border exemptions were granted for cast and crew, production resumed in June. All the film's interior scenes were shot on sound stages in Auckland during the final weeks of filming. Principal photography concluded in July. Throughout the production Cumberbatch stayed in character; he and Dunst agreed not to speak on set.

=== Cinematography ===
Director of photography Ari Wegner shot The Power of the Dog using two Arri Alexa LF cameras paired with Panavision Ultra Panatar anamorphic lenses, with a 2.40:1 aspect ratio. Campion was specifically looking for a female cinematographer who would embark on a full year of preparations alongside her. She sought out Wegner, who had shot a 2015 ANZ ad campaign with Campion. Wegner and Campion did meticulous storyboarding for the film, sometimes separately so that the two could compare later. Wegner drew extensively on the work of Evelyn Cameron, an English photographer who moved to Montana near the turn of the 20th century. Period photographs from the Time magazine archives, Ken Burns's documentary series The West, and the works of artists Andrew Wyeth and Lucian Freud were additional points of reference.

=== Set design ===
Grant Major was responsible for The Power of the Dog's production design; he had worked with Campion on her film An Angel at My Table. In inclement weather, Major and his team built the façade of the two-story mansion, a working barn, a cattle pen, and stockyards on location in time for the start of the shoot. The interiors of the mansion, built later on a sound stage in Auckland, were modeled after Theodore Roosevelt's Sagamore Hill. Period-correct furniture was not readily available in New Zealand, so set decorator Amber Richards sourced most of the objects from various prop houses in Los Angeles.

=== Music ===
Campion recruited Jonny Greenwood to compose the film score. Greenwood wanted to avoid the "sweeping strings" typical of Westerns, opting instead to use atonal brass sounds to emphasize the "alien, forbidding" quality of the landscape. He was not satisfied with the sound of Phil's banjo on screen and, as an alternative, played the cello like a banjo on his own, using the same fingerpicking technique. The resulting sound, according to Greenwood, was "a nice confusion" and "a sound you recognize, but it's not a style that you’re familiar with." As a result of the pandemic and the accompanying restrictions, Greenwood was unable to work with an orchestra and recorded many of the cello parts himself, layering them to achieve an orchestral texture.

== Release ==
The Power of the Dog premiered at the 78th Venice International Film Festival on September 2, 2021, and had Special Presentation screenings at the 2021 Toronto International Film Festival and Telluride Film Festival that same month. By the end of its run, it screened at film festivals in Charlottesville, London, Middleburg, Mill Valley, Montclair, New York (centerpiece screening), San Diego, San Sebastian, Savannah, and Zurich. It also played at the 52nd International Film Festival of India in November.

The film had a limited theatrical release in Australia and New Zealand commencing on November 11, 2021, with theatrical distribution in both countries handled by Transmission Films. The film's limited theatrical release in the United States and the United Kingdom began on November 17, before it was released on Netflix worldwide on December 1. A behind-the-scenes documentary, Behind the Scenes with Jane Campion, was released on Netflix worldwide on January 27, 2022. Between promotion and awards campaigns, Netflix spent around $50 million on the film.

The Criterion Collection released the film on DVD and Blu-ray on November 8, 2022.

== Reception ==
=== Box office ===
Although Netflix does not report box-office grosses of its films, IndieWire estimated the film made $125,000 from 40 theaters in its opening weekend, and a total of $160,000 over its first five days.

=== Audience viewership ===
Over its first five days of digital release it was streamed by 1.2 million U.S. households, 92,000 UK households, 37,000 German households, and 16,000 Australian. By March 20 the film had been streamed in 3.4 million U.S. households, including 717,000 since the Oscar nomination announcements on February 8. Between its release and June 2023, the film totaled 4.8 million hours watched.

=== Critical response ===
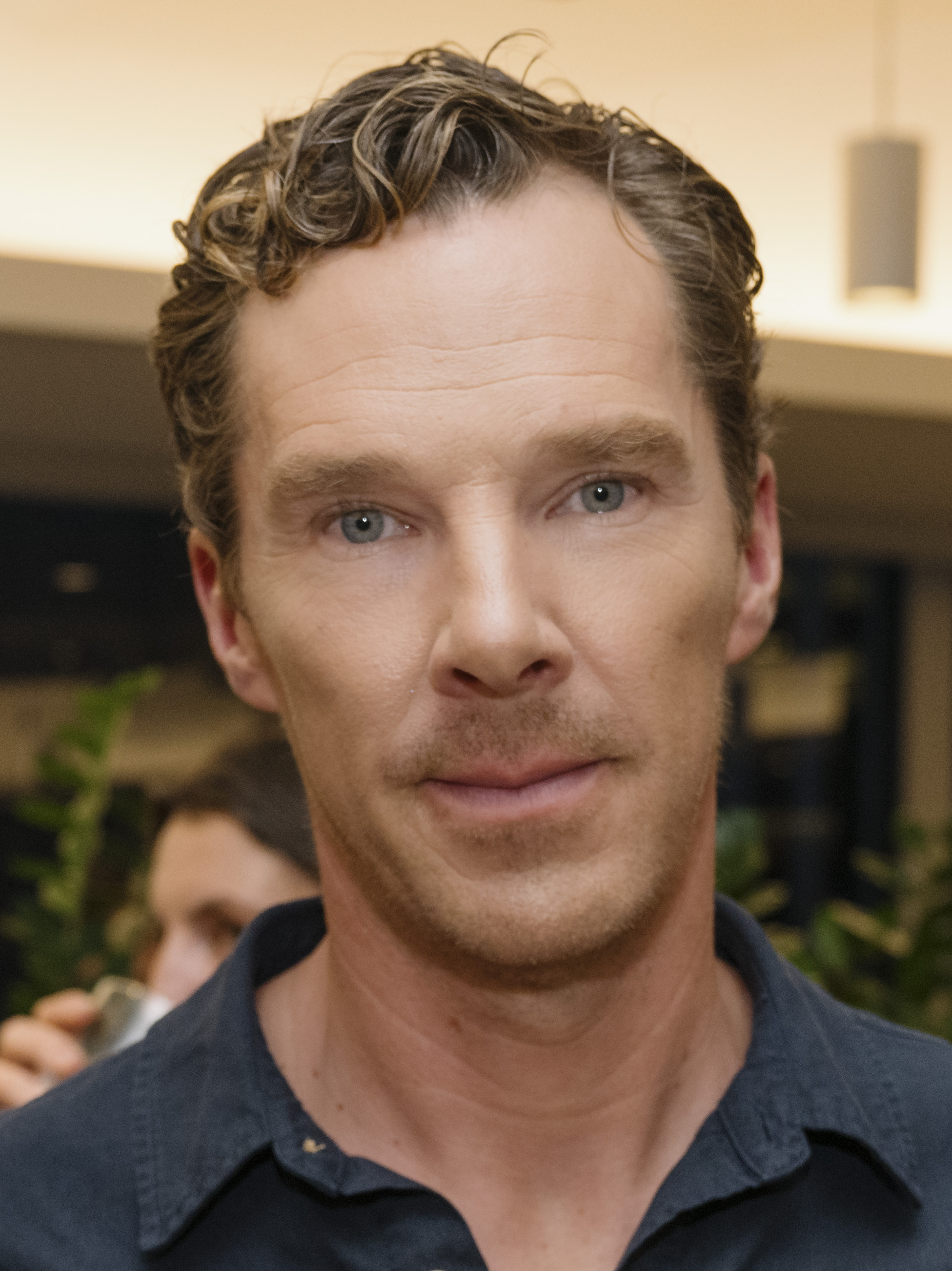
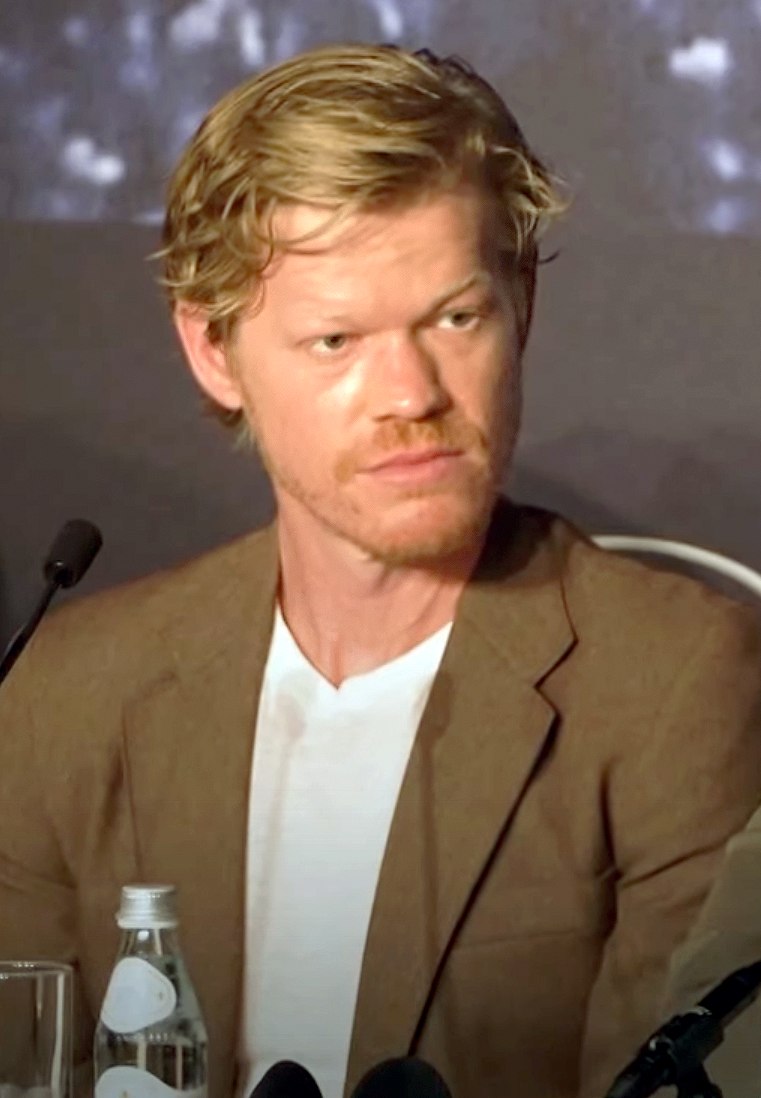
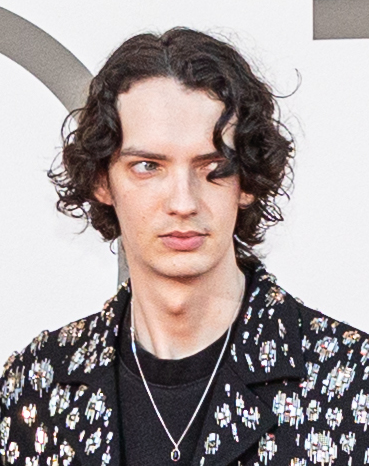
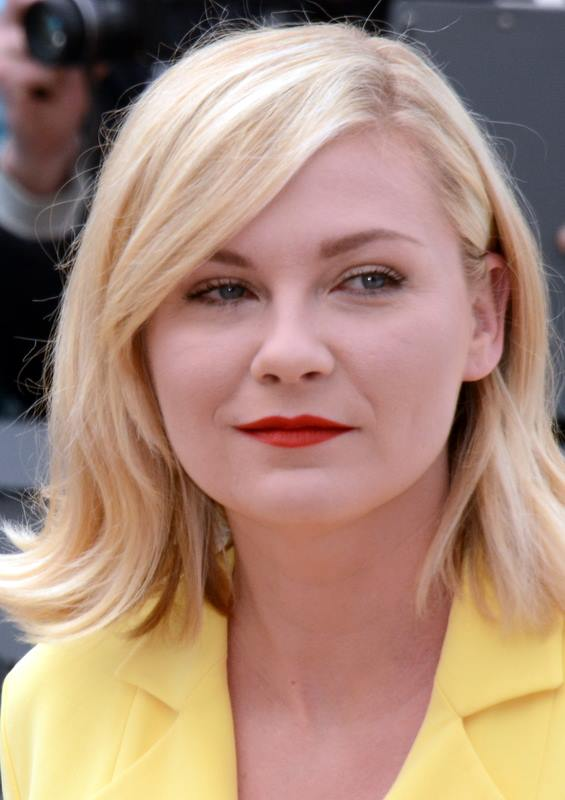
Benedict Cumberbatch, Jesse Plemons, Kodi Smit-McPhee, and Kirsten Dunst received critical acclaim for their performances. Cumberbatch was nominated for the Academy Award for Best Actor, Plemons and Smit-McPhee for Best Supporting Actor, and Dunst for Best Supporting Actress.

On review aggregator website Rotten Tomatoes, the film has an approval rating of 94% based on 351 reviews, with an average rating of 8.4/10. The site's critical consensus reads, "Brought to life by a stellar ensemble led by Benedict Cumberbatch, The Power of the Dog reaffirms writer-director Jane Campion as one of her generation's finest filmmakers." Metacritic assigned a weighted average score of 89 out of 100 based on 58 critics.

Reviewing the film for The Hollywood Reporter, David Rooney wrote: "This is an exquisitely crafted film, its unhurried rhythms continually shifting as plangent notes of melancholy, solitude, torment, jealousy and resentment surface. Campion is in full control of her material, digging deep into the turbulent inner life of each of her characters with unerring subtlety." Conversely, Owen Gleiberman of Variety wrote: "All of this should build, slowly and inexorably, in force and emotion. But for a film that's actually, at heart, rather tidy and old-fashioned in its triangular gamesmanship, The Power of the Dog needed to get to a more bruising catharsis. In its crucial last act, the film becomes too oblique."

Metacritic reported that The Power of the Dog appeared on over 118 film critics' top-ten lists for 2021, the most for any film that year. It ranked first on 31 lists and second on 23 lists.

Former U.S. President Barack Obama cited it as among his favorite films of 2021.

On 6 April 2023, it ranked 15th on The Hollywood Reporter's list of the "50 Best Films of the 21st Century (So Far)" and was called a "brilliantly uncomfortable chamber piece about corrosive masculinity fed by sexual repression" and a "psychodrama whose epic scope is echoed in its majestic landscapes". On 24 August 2023, it ranked eighth on Collider's list of "The 20 Best Drama Movies of the 2020s So Far". Collider wrote, "Campion unravels an understated love story in the heart of the American west, and shows how forcing someone to conform can lead to tragic circumstances". The March 2022 issue of New York magazine included the film as one of "The Best Movies That Lost Best Picture at the Oscars". In 2024, IndieWire included it on its list of "The Best Modern Western Movies," with Wilson Chapman calling it "one of the most intimate films of Jane Campion's career." IndieWire also ranked it number 14 on its list of "The 100 Best Movies of the 2020s (So Far)" in June 2025.

=== Accolades ===
The Power of the Dog is the first film directed by a woman to receive more than ten Academy Award nominations, and Campion is the first woman to receive more than one Academy Award nomination for Best Director, her first being for The Piano. The film is the first since Becket (1964) to win only one award from 12 nominations.
