= Elizabeth Savage (writer) =

American author (1918–1989)

- Born: February 15, 1918; Hingham, Montana
- Died: July 15, 1989 (aged 71); Whidbey Island, Washington, United States.
- Education: Colby College (B.A., English, Magna Cum Laude)
- Occupation: Author
- Spouse: Thomas Savage
- Children: 3
- Writing career
- Notable works: The Last Night at the Ritz, The Girls from the Five Great Valleys

Elizabeth Savage (née Fitzgerald; February 15, 1918 – July 15, 1989) was an American novelist and short-story writer. In nine novels, she explored the turbulent decades between 1930 and 1980 in the Western United States and along the Atlantic Coast. Her work focuses on men and women dealing with the Great Depression, World War II, the birth of the women’s movement, the Sixties counterculture and the Vietnam War. Among her best-known books are The Last Night at the Ritz, the semi-autobiographical The Girls from the Five Great Valleys, Summer of Pride, But Not for Love, A Fall of Angels, and Happy Ending.

Savage was married for 50 years to the equally celebrated novelist Thomas Savage, with whom she had three children. In novels such as But Not For Love, she captures the stresses caused by class distinctions, economic differences and male/female relationships within groups of friends or extended families, whether the combatants live in Maine beach colonies, remote Idaho ranches or Montana college towns. She also focuses on complex female friendships, stretching over many years. A strong sense of place permeates all her work. Three of Savage's novels illuminate the American West, where she spent much of her childhood. Others are set in Maine, where she lived most of her adulthood.

== Early life ==
Savage was born in Hingham, Montana. She was the daughter of Mildred Ridlon and Brassil Fitzgerald. Her father was an English professor and freelance writer. “He was a harbinger of this peripatetic century;” she once said. “He attended Boston College, the University of Arizona and Stanford before he taught first at Utah and then Montana. So I grew up thinking of myself primarily as a westerner and was not surprised to marry one—although we met in the east.”

Known as “Betty” to her family and friends, Savage graduated from Missoula County High School in Missoula, Montana, and went east to enroll at Colby College, Waterville, Maine, in 1937. That summer, she began exchanging letters with “a friend of a friend,” the young man who would become her husband. Thomas (then known as Thomas Brenner) was from Horse Prairie, Montana. Although he had been a student of her father’s at the University of Montana, Missoula, he had never met Elizabeth. After months of letters, he hopped on a Greyhound bus and traveled from Montana to Boston, where he met his future wife and her mother at the Copley Plaza Hotel, a scene she later fictionalized in her best-known novel, The Last Night at the Ritz.

Afterwards, Thomas joined Elizabeth at Colby College. The couple married in 1939, while still students, and received B.A. degrees in 1940. She graduated magna cum laude. The Savages lived in Chicago, Montana and Massachusetts, before settling down in Maine, their home for the next thirty years.

During the Maine years, both Savages established "big literary careers as novelists." Each published nine novels. In 1985, they moved to Whidbey Island, Washington, where Thomas had a recently discovered sister. Elizabeth died there in 1989. She was 71 years old.

== Career ==
Savage wrote her first novel, Lacquer Lady, at the age of 10, featuring not only a "sophisticated young woman who wore black" but also "Binky, an older man of 18". She won a National Scholastic prize for The Master in the House, a one-act play set in Hingham, her birthplace.It was later published by Samuel French.

After she married and became busy raising children, Savage wrote mainly poetry. She sold a story based on her husband's grandmother, "The Sheep Queen of Idaho", to the Saturday Evening Post for $1,000—a princely sum at the time. She was 42 years old before she published her first novel, Summer of Pride, in 1960. The second novel, But Not for Love, came ten year later.

”But once she was freed up, she wrote quite rapidly," said her husband.

Seven novels followed, sometimes one a year. She also wrote for Writer magazine, Paris Review, Redbook and Saturday Evening Post.

Savage's last work has a prophetic name, Toward the End. She died in Washington State in 1989, nine years after its publication.

Asked about her influences, Savage listed William Makepeace Thackeray and Charles Dickens. Her interest in Victorian literature is reflected in Willowwood: A Novel, (1978), an exploration of the Pre-Raphaelite Brotherhood focused on the complicated relationship between artist Dante Gabriel Rossetti and his muse Elizabeth Siddal.

In 2012, Nancy Pearl sparked new interest in Savage's work when The Last Night at the Ritz became a Nancy Pearl's Book Lust Rediscoveries imprint. A line from the novel had been a favorite of Pearl's for many years. "It is very dangerous to get caught without something to read." Pearl notes that The Last Night In the Ritz is set in the Mad Men era and "there's a lot of drink, everyone smokes (cigarettes) and fornication, not to say adultery, is hardly an unknown event."

Last Night at the Ritz displays a "delicate interplay of past and present that is a pure delight ... " wrote Martin Levin in The New York Times. "The nostalgic aura surrounding these happenings is strong enough to make Elizabeth Savage's novel glow in the dark." Time magazine said that "In a very short compass, with extraordinary deftness, humor and a rueful shrewdness edging toward wisdom, it rises above its genre to something not unlike small genius."

"Published in 1973 and set in the late 1960s, The Last Night at the Ritz is both intensely of its time and also, in important ways, absolutely timeless," notes the Library Journal.

The Girls From the Five Great Valleys became a Book Lust Rediscoveries in 2014. Built around five young women on the brink of adulthood in Missoula, Montana, it is set during the Great Depression and contrasts five stable families with the poverty around them. The main themes are chance and "the terrible inexorability of change."

== Novels ==
- Summer of Pride (Boston: Little, 1960).
- But Not for Love (Boston: Little, 1970).
- A Fall of Angels (Boston: Little, 1971).
- Happy Ending (Boston: Little, 1972).
- The Last Night at the Ritz (Boston: Little, 1973).
- A Good Confession (Boston: Little, 1975.)
- The Girls from the Five Great Valleys (Boston: Little, Brown 1976).
- Willowwood: A Novel (Boston: Little, 1978).
- Toward the End (Boston: Little, 1980).

== Selected publications ==
- Savage, Elizabeth. "The Sheep Queen of Idaho," Saturday Evening Post, 1952, p. 24.
- Savage, Elizabeth. "Bitter Christmas". Saturday Evening Post November 29, 1952, p. 24+.
- Savage, Elizabeth. "Victoria", Paris Review, Issue 24, Fall 1960.
- Savage, Elizabeth. "Summer of Pride" (condensation) Redbook January 1962, p. 111+.
- Savage, Elizabeth. "One Way Out". Writer, September 1972, p 9-10.
- Savage, Elizabeth. "Beautiful Day" (excerpt from Happy Ending). Redbook, February 1972–3, p, 173 +.
- Savage, Elizabeth. "Bringing it Back". Writer. December 1974 p. 15-16.
- Savage, Elizabeth. "Bringing George Home". A Book for Boston. Boston: Godine, 1980, p. 207-13.
- Savage, Elizabeth. "Before You Write Your Historical Novel". Writer. April 1981, p. 20-122.
