= Peel (1982 film) =

- Directed by: Jane Campion
- Written by: Jane Campion
- Produced by: Ulla Ryghe
- Starring: Tim Pye; Katie Pye; Ben Martin
- Cinematography: Sally Bongers
- Edited by: Jane Campion
- Music by: Ralph Tyrrell
- Release date: 1982
- Running time: 9 minutes
- Country: Australia
- Language: English

Peel, also known as An Exercise in Discipline – Peel, is a 1982 Australian short film directed by Jane Campion. A father along with his son and sister are taking a trip, during which an orange peel has significance. Peel won the Short Film Palme d'Or at the 1986 Cannes Film Festival, making Campion the first woman to win the award.
