= Thomas Savage (novelist) =

American novelist

- Savage, c. 1976
- Born: April 25, 1915; Salt Lake City, Utah, U.S.
- Died: July 25, 2003 (aged 88); Virginia Beach, Virginia, U.S.
- Education: Colby College
- Occupation: Novelist
- Spouse: Elizabeth Savage (m. 1939; died 1989)
- Children: 3
- Writing career
- Period: 1937–1988
- Genre: Western
- Notable works: The Power of the Dog (1967); A Strange God (1974); I Heard My Sister Speak My Name (1977); The Corner of Rife and Pacific (1988)

Thomas Savage (April 25, 1915 – July 25, 2003) was an American author of novels published between 1944 and 1988. He is best known for his Western novels, which drew on early experiences in the American West.

== Life ==
=== Early life ===
Savage was born in Salt Lake City in 1915 to Elizabeth (Yearian) and Benjamin Savage. His parents divorced when he was two years old, and he moved with his mother to a ranch near Lemhi, Idaho. When his mother remarried Charles Brenner in 1920, Savage moved with his mother and his stepfather to the Brenner cattle ranch in Beaverhead County, Montana. Charles Brenner adopted young Savage, who took the Brenner name. However, Savage felt like a misfit on the ranch. Savage was home schooled in the early grades but the Brenners sent him away to Dillon, the nearest town of any size, to attend high school. Savage's early experiences influenced his writing and are reflected in many of his novels.

In 1932, Savage graduated from Beaverhead County High School. Savage studied writing at the State University of Montana (today the University of Montana), where he met Brassil Fitzgerald (1896–1962), a professor of English literature and a novelist, (Note: Robert Brassil Fitzgerald published and taught under the name Brassil Fitzgerald. His works include Never Surrender (1943) and Onward, Mr. Casey: The Misadventures of a Gentle Man (1952).) who introduced Savage to his only daughter, Elizabeth Fitzgerald, who then left to study English Literature at Colby College in Waterville, Maine. Savage published his first story, "The Bronc Stomper", in Coronet in 1937, to some critical success, and then joined Elizabeth at Colby. He and Elizabeth were married on September 15, 1939; theirs was the first marriage of two Colby students. They received their B.A. degrees in 1940. Both would become well-known novelists, writing as Thomas Savage and Elizabeth Savage.

=== Career ===
After their marriage, the Savages lived briefly in Chicago before moving back to Montana in 1942 to work on the Brenner ranch. World War II made it hard to find ranch hands, and Charles Brenner needed help. But Savage still felt out of place on the ranch, and he dropped the Brenner surname and returned to using his birth father's name. After just a year, the couple moved away from the ranch, settling in Massachusetts.

By the time Savage was 29, he had worked as a wrangler, ranch hand, welder, and railroad brakeman. In 1944, Doubleday published Savage's first novel, The Pass. In spite of encouraging sales, revenue from the book was not enough to support the Savage family, which now included two boys, Robert and Russell. Savage secured a teaching position at Suffolk University in Boston where he taught from 1947 to 1948. His daughter Elizabeth was born in 1949, the same year he began teaching at Brandeis University in Waltham, Massachusetts, founded just a year earlier. One of the few non-Jewish faculty members, he was promoted to assistant professor in his third year. In 1953, he published his third book, A Bargain with God, his most popular success, confirmed when republished in a condensed version by Reader's Digest. By 1955, Savage was able to leave Brandeis and devote himself to writing full-time.

In 1955, the Savages purchased a home in Georgetown, Maine, where they would remain for nearly thirty years. Tom wrote a total of 13 novels. Elizabeth Savage's ambition to be a novelist was also realized, once their children were sufficiently raised. She wrote nine novels, including the famous Last Night at the Ritz. She also helped edit her husband's novels, a task at which he thought she excelled.

In 1982, the Savages built a home on Whidbey Island in Puget Sound, on property given to him by his sister. Savage published his last novel in 1988. Set in Montana, The Corner of Rife and Pacific follows the founders of a tiny Montana town over several generations. Elizabeth Savage died on Whidbey Island in 1989. Savage kept a photo of her by his bedside until his death. He observed that any loving partnership required laughter and good conversation, and after her death he often complained that he missed her conversation.

While married, Savage had several long-term and close relationships with men, only after he began slowly coming out in the late 1950s. His wife was aware of his homosexuality before they married. Late in life, he told his daughter he should not be characterized as bisexual. Manohla Dargis, in her New York Times review of the 2021 film based on Savage's The Power of the Dog, described him as "a closeted gay man".

=== Decline and death ===
After the death of his wife in 1989, Savage lived briefly in Seattle and San Francisco, before moving to Virginia Beach, Virginia, to be near his daughter. His son, the writer Robert Brassil Savage, was struck and killed by a vehicle in 2001 while walking on Virginia Beach Boulevard. In 2001, the Montana Book Festival featured a panel on Savage and his work, but Savage—then 86 years old—did not attend.

Savage died in Virginia Beach on July 25, 2003, at age 88.

== Writing career ==
Savage published his first story, "The Bronc Stomper", in 1937 in Coronet under the name Tom Brenner. Annie Proulx has noted that the story was "unremarkable except for its unusual subject matter", breaking a horse. However, the seventy-five dollar payment he received encouraged him to attempt writing a novel. In his first two novels, he introduced the theme of a dysfunctional ranch dynasty that appears throughout Savage's western novels. The Pass (1944) was dedicated to his mother and set in the Lemhi Valley, Idaho. Doubleday's advance payment of $750 for the manuscript confirmed his belief in his career as a writer, a view confirmed when a long section of the novel was included in an anthology of Montana fiction in 1946. (Note: The anthology was Montana Margins.) His second novel, Lona Hanson (1948), continued the story and proved a financial success unequalled by any of his later Western novels. Columbia Pictures paid him $50,000 for the movie rights. The film slated to star Rita Hayworth and William Holden was never made, but the payment made Savage financially secure.

In 1967, Savage's The Power of the Dog was released. The plot focuses on two brothers, simple but honest George Burbank and cold yet malicious Phil Burbank. Phil works to destroy his sister-in-law, goading her with insults to alcoholism in the hope that George will divorce her. He hopes to make an ally of his nephew Peter in this, but Peter proved loyal to his mother. Critics considered the novel Savage's best. The book received favorable reviews. In the New York Times, Marshall Sprague wrote that Savage had "a magic hand" with characters that have "a classic inevitability", adding, "The prose is austere and economical. Mr. Savage is not one to waste a whole word if no word at all will do." Sales of the book remained modest. In 2001 a new edition was published with an afterword by Annie Proulx. In 2021, a film version was adapted by Jane Campion, featuring Benedict Cumberbatch, Kirsten Dunst, Jesse Plemons and Kodi Smit-McPhee. The film was a critical success, earning several accolades, including the Academy Award for Best Director for Campion.

Savage published I Heard My Sister Speak my Name in 1977 (reprinted in 2001 as The Sheep Queen). He was inspired by a phone call he received as an adult informing him he had an older sister Patricia [Savage] Hemingway. Patricia, the first child born to Tom's parents, was given up for adoption. Tom did not know Patricia until much later in life and the siblings finally met in 1969. Tom and his sister grew to be close friends and always laughed about their similarities, including that they smoked the same cigarettes, liked the same beer and had the same deep throated laugh.

Savage received a Guggenheim Fellowship in 1979. He used it to write Her Side of It, which he considered his best work. His last novel, The Corner of Rife and Pacific, was nominated for the PEN/Faulkner Award and received the Pacific Northwest Booksellers Association Award in 1989.

In his writing, Savage dealt with themes of fatal provincialism and the claustrophobia of sexual boundaries. He used his novels to denounce the bigotry he considered entrenched in the western towns and ranches of his upbringing. He loosely modeled several character types on his own family. His beloved mother inspired the character of a culturally refined young mother, driven by isolation to alcohol. His grandmother Emma Russell Yearian inspired the character of an iron-fisted matriarch. His stepfather Charles Brenner inspired the character of an honest but slow-witted rancher. His uncle William Brenner inspired the character of a manipulative, calculating ranch hand. Savage wrote himself into many of his novels in the character of an outsider, unsuited to ranch life. These characters appear in many of his novels under different names and different circumstances.

When asked to speak of his influences, Savage stated "Mrs. Bridge, by Evan S. Connell, is one of the best novels I ever read. I was influenced by John Steinbeck, Robert Benchley, and Dorothy Parker. I was a history major, read little fiction, chiefly biography and history. I read S.J. Perelman."

== Awards ==
- Honorary M.F.A. from Colby College, 1954
- Guggenheim Fellowship, 1979
- Pacific Northwest Booksellers Association Award, 1989 for The Corner of Rife and Pacific

== Selected writings ==
Novels

- The Pass (1944)
- Lona Hanson (1948)
- A Bargain with God (1953)
- Trust in Chariots (1961)
- The Power of the Dog (1967)
- The Liar (1969)
- Daddy's Girl (1970)
- A Strange God (1974)
- Midnight Line (1976)
- I Heard My Sister Speak My Name (1977)
  - republished with the author's approval as The Sheep Queen in 2001
- Her Side of It (1981)
- For Mary with Love (1983)
- The Corner of Rife and Pacific (1988)
