= Amber Richards (set decorator) =

New Zealand set decorator

- Occupation: Set decorator

Amber Richards is a New Zealand set decorator. She was nominated for an Academy Award in the category Best Production Design for the film The Power of the Dog.

== Selected filmography ==
- The Power of the Dog (2021; co-nominated with Grant Major)
