= Passionless Moments =

1983 film

- Directed by: Jane Campion; Gerard Lee
- Written by: Jane Campion; Gerard Lee
- Produced by: Jane Campion; Gerard Lee
- Starring: David Benton
- Cinematography: Jane Campion
- Edited by: Veronika Jenet
- Release date: 1983
- Running time: 13 minutes
- Country: Australia
- Language: English

Passionless Moments is a 1983 short Australian drama film written and directed by Jane Campion and Gerard Lee. It was screened in the Un Certain Regard section at the 1986 Cannes Film Festival.

== Cast ==
- David Benton - Ed Tumbury
- Ann Burriman - Gwen Gilbert
- Alan Brown - Neighbor / Neighbor
- Sean Callinan - Jim Newbury
- Paul Chubb - Jim Simpson
- Sue Collie - Angela Elliott
- Haedyn Cunningham - Board Member
- Ron Gobert - Board Member
- Elias Ibrahim - Ibrahim Ibrahim
- Paul Melchert - Arnold
- George Nezovic - Gavin Metchalle
- Jamie Pride - Lyndsay Aldridge
- Gordon Quiller - Board Member
- Keith Smith - Board Member
- Yves Stening - Shaun
