= The Power of the Dog (Savage novel) =

1967 novel by Thomas Savage

- First edition (publ. Little, Brown)
- Author: Thomas Savage
- Cover artist: Milton Glaser
- Language: English
- Genre: Western fiction
- Set in: Montana
- Published: Print
- Publisher: Little, Brown and Company
- Publication date: 1967
- Publication place: United States
- Media type: Print (hardcover)
- Pages: 276
- OCLC: 1065897
- Dewey Decimal: 813/.54
- LC Class: PZ3.S2652 Po PS3569.A83

The Power of the Dog is a 1967 novel of Western fiction written by American author Thomas Savage.

The story deals with bachelor brothers Phil and George, who live on a ranch in Montana, and the events following George's marriage. Phil looks with disdain at George's new wife, Rose, and her son Pete, after which dramatic events begin to unfold.

In 2021, the novel was adapted into a film of the same name which went on to be nominated for 12 Oscars and renewed interest in the novel.

== Plot ==
In Montana in 1925, bachelor brothers Phil and George Burbank run the family ranch together after their parents retire to Salt Lake City. Phil is an incredibly gifted man who is talented in all aspects of his life and is highly educated but chooses to live as a rough rancher. George is his less notable younger brother.

While driving their cattle into the small town of Beech, Phil offends the widow Rose Gordon, a local businesswoman and hotelier whose doctor husband had committed suicide, when he makes a cruel comment towards her teenage son, Peter, calling him a sissy. When George goes to pay the bill he finds Rose weeping and he begins to visit her to make amends. Hearing of this, Phil writes to his mother hoping to break the two up. Instead George announces they have secretly wed.

Rose soon moves into the ranch house with George, and Phil takes an instant dislike to her, believing her to be a conniving gold digger. He does all he can to make life unpleasant for Rose, who senses Phil's subtle animosity and struggles to adjust to her new life.

Peter temporarily takes up residence at a boarding school in a nearby town but is brought out to the Burbank ranch during summer break. He approves of his mother's relationship with George but immediately finds himself antagonized by Phil after he accidentally stumbles across Phil naked in a private pond he uses for bathing.

Rose secretly begins to drink to cope with blinding headaches she develops because of the tense living situation between Phil, her, and her son, and begins stealing liquor from George's cabinet. When she makes a final attempt to make peace with Phil by asking him why he dislikes her, he reveals that he knows about her drinking. The confrontation is overheard by Peter.

After Phil witnesses Peter being humiliated by the fellow ranchers but choosing to ignore their jeers, he decides to take Peter under his wing in order to pry him away from Rose, scheming in the hope that George will eventually divorce her. Phil, however, unwittingly becomes enthralled by Peter and comes to admire his confidence and curiosity. After Rose sells Burbank hides without Phil's permission, Phil becomes enraged with her; he had planned to use the hides to braid a rope for Peter. Peter offers to let Phil use a hide he has saved in order to finish the work and Phil is overcome by the gesture, privately admitting to himself that he is sexually attracted to Peter, an attraction he had felt only once before with his mentor Bronco Henry.

Shortly after, Phil takes ill and dies. The Burbank family becomes more closely knit after this. Rose stops drinking and invites George's parents to visit the ranch for Christmas. Peter is elated that his mother is happy at last and reflects that this was always meant to be, as his father's suicide and his own action of giving Phil a hide tainted with anthrax has paved the way for her to be content.

== Reception ==
Michelle Nijhuis from Literary Hub writes about the reception of the book: "Though published to critical acclaim, Thomas Savage's 1967 novel, The Power of the Dog, sold poorly and was largely forgotten until its republication in 2001, after which it began to be appreciated as a regional classic". She describes the novel as "spare, chilling, and finely crafted, and while its action feels as fated as a Greek epic, it still manages to shock".

A contemporary review in Kirkus Reviews praised Savage's storytelling for its "skill and scope" and the "cautious, yet concise, characterizations to the refined horror of its denouement."

In her afterword to the book, author Annie Proulx describes The Power of the Dog as a "literary artwork" and an influence on her works like "Brokeback Mountain".

== Film adaptation ==
The book was adapted into a 2021 film of the same name written and directed by Jane Campion. She described that she was not able to put it down and afterwards kept thinking about it: "When I made a move to find out who had the rights, that's when I knew it had got me. I needed to do it." The film stays generally close to the book.

== Literature ==
- Sue Hart: Thomas and Elizabeth Savage. Boise State University Western Writers Series No. 119, Boise/Idaho 1995.
- O. Alan Weltzien: "Thomas Savage: Forgotten Novelist" In: Montana. The Magazine of Western History. Band 58, Nr. 4, Winter 2008, p. 22–41, 93–94.
- Alan Weltzien: "Literary Sociology in Montana Town: Novelist Thomas Savage Rewrites Old Dillon." In: Great Plains Quarterly. Band 37, Nr. 2. Spring 2017, p. 111–130.
- O. Alan Weltzien: Savage West: The Life and Fiction of Thomas Savage. University of Nevada Press, Reno/Las Vegas 2020, ISBN 978-1-948908-86-3.
