= Police State (1989 film) =

- Written by: Ian David; Francine Finnane; Chris Noonan
- Directed by: Chris Noonan
- Starring: Bill Hunter; Nick Tate; Max Phipps; Gerry Connolly
- Country of origin: Australia
- Original language: English

Production
- Producer: Rod Allan
- Running time: 90 mins
- Production companies: ABC; Southern Star

Original release
- Network: ABC
- Release: 1989

Police State is a 1989 Australian television film about the Fitzgerald Inquiry.

== Cast ==
- Bill Hunter as Graeme Parker
- Nick Tate as Tony Fitzgerald
- Max Phipps as Queensland Police Commissioner Terry Lewis
- Gerry Connolly as Premier Joh Bjelke-Petersen
- Lewis Fitz-Gerald as Gary Crooke
- Lynette Curran as Dawn Parker
- Damon Herriman as Parker's young son
- Peter Carroll as Narrator
