= Act of Betrayal =

1988 television film by Lawrence Gordon Clark

- Genre: Miniseries
- Written by: Nicholas Evans; Michael Chaplin
- Directed by: Lawrence Gordon Clark
- Starring: Lisa Harrow; Elliott Gould; Patrick Bergin; Deborra-Lee Furness; Max Cullen
- Composer: Bruce Smeaton
- Countries of origin: Australia; Ireland
- Original language: English
- No. of episodes: 2 x 2 hours

Production
- Executive producers: Graham Benson; Michael Deakin; John Kelleher; Sandra Levy; Joe Mulholland
- Producers: Nick Evans; Ray Alchin
- Cinematography: Peter Hendry; Breffni Byrne
- Editor: Lynn Solly
- Running time: 240 mins
- Production companies: ABC; Benbow Evans Productions; Griffin Productions; Radio Telefís Éireann; TVS Television

Original release
- Network: ABC
- Release: 18 September – 19 September 1988

Act of Betrayal is a 1988 mini-series that was a co-production between Ireland, Australia and the US. Directed by Lawrence Gordon Clark, it stars Lisa Harrow, Elliott Gould, Patrick Bergin, Deborra-Lee Furness, and Max Cullen.

It had a budget of $6 million and was later cut down to a 117-minute TV movie.

== Premise ==
Michael McGurk, an IRA man, turns informer and the British police send him to Australia with his family. The IRA send an American hit man, Callaghan, to assassinate him. A woman, Kathy, has an affair with both McGurk and Callaghan.

== Cast ==
- Lisa Harrow as Eileen McGurk
- Elliott Gould as Callaghan
- Patrick Bergin as Michael McGurk
- Bryan Marshall as Kennedy
- Krister Greer as Sean McGurk
- Deborra-Lee Furness as Kathy
- Max Cullen as Quinn
- Bosco Hogan as Brady
- Oliver Maguire as IRA Chief
- Gerard McSorley as Brendon
- Stella McCusker as Eileen's Mother

== Reception ==
Max Cullen's performance as an Australian IRA sympathiser won him an AFI Award.
