= Georgia (1988 film) =

1988 film by Ben Lewin

- Theatrical release poster
- Directed by: Ben Lewin
- Screenplay by: Ben Lewin; Joanna Murray-Smith; Bob Weis
- Story by: Mac Gudgeon
- Produced by: Bob Weis
- Starring: Judy Davis
- Cinematography: Yuri Sokol
- Edited by: Edward McQueen-Mason
- Music by: Paul Grabowsky
- Distributed by: Jethro Films Production
- Release dates: 9 September 1988 (TIFF); 12 October 1989 (Australia)
- Running time: 90 minutes
- Country: Australia
- Language: English
- Budget: 3 million
- Box office: 44,205 (Australia)

Georgia is a 1988 Australian thriller film directed by Ben Lewin (in his theatrical film directing debut) and starring Judy Davis.

== Plot ==
Judy Davis plays the two roles of a mother, Georgia, and her daughter Nina. The film is presented as a series of flashbacks as Nina investigates her mother's death, which led to her adoption as a young child.

== Cast ==
- Judy Davis as Nina Bailley/Georgia White
- John Bach as Karlin
- Julia Blake as Elizabeth
- Alex Menglet as Lazlo
- Marshall Napier as Frank Le Mat
- Tommy Dysart as Bystander
- Lynda Gibson as Policewoman 2
- John O'May as Mr Leonard

== Production ==
The film was inspired by Albert Tucker's 1984 painting of Joy Hester. Producer Bob Weis originally wanted to make a film based on Hester's life but decided to make a fictional film.

== Box office performance ==
Georgia grossed $44,205 at the box office in Australia.

== See also ==
- Cinema of Australia
