= Sweetie (1989 film) =

Film by Jane Campion

- Film poster
- Directed by: Jane Campion
- Written by: Jane Campion; Gerard Lee
- Produced by: John Maynard
- Starring: Genevieve Lemon; Karen Colston; Tom Lycos; Dorothy Barry; Jon Darling; Michael Lake
- Cinematography: Sally Bongers
- Edited by: Veronika Jenet
- Music by: Martin Armiger
- Distributed by: Filmpac Distribution
- Release date: 28 September 1989
- Running time: 97 minutes
- Country: Australia
- Language: English

Sweetie is a 1989 Australian black comedy drama film directed by Jane Campion, and starring Genevieve Lemon, Karen Colston, Tom Lycos, and Jon Darling. Co-written by Campion and Gerard Lee, the film documents the contentious and chaotic relationships among a woman in her twenties, her parents, and her emotionally unstable sister. It was Jane Campion's second feature film. It was entered into the 1989 Cannes Film Festival, and won an Independent Spirit Award for Best Foreign Film in 1991.

== Plot ==
The story focuses on a dysfunctional Australian family that includes two daughters: Dawn (nicknamed "Sweetie"), a lively, but erratic, and often delusional woman who fancies herself an actor, and her uptight, sullen, and superstitious sister Kay, a factory worker who has a boyfriend named Louis. Their parents, Flo and Gordon, are having serious marital problems.

Kay loves Louis because the words of a fortune teller portended she would end up with him. However, the couple's relationship begins to show signs of strain, with Kay uprooting and hiding a tree Louis attempts to plant in their yard because she feels a deep foreboding about it. After an absence, Sweetie returns home with her druggie lover and "producer" Bob; she then proceeds to intimidate, control, and abuse the other members of her family. Gordon chooses to ignore Sweetie's mental illness and erratic, childish behavior because he loves her and thinks of her as a child. Throughout the film, there are flashbacks to Sweetie dancing, singing and performing small, circus-like tricks with Gordon's assistance. Flo admits he indulges her.

Sweetie's emotional volatility and physical destructiveness (ruining Kay's clothes, breaking furniture) reflects the disruption she has caused her family. Louis breaks up with Kay after mounting tension between the couple. After a series of circular fights (Sweetie rages, her family forgives her, her sweetness and fun persona return), Sweetie completely loses her mind. She strips off her clothes, paints her body black and holes up in her childhood tree house. Though her family begs her to come down, she refuses and keeps shaking the fort until it falls from the tree, killing her and injuring Flo. Trees continue to play a role even after Sweetie's death, as her private interment is briefly disrupted by a tree root that obstructs her grave.

Louis and Kay get back together, while Kay's family achieves a sort of resolution. They no longer feel manipulated and agitated by Sweetie's presence. However, the best of her personality persists, as Kay and her parents maintain an image of her in her truest form, that of a little girl.

== Cast ==
- Geneviève Lemon as Dawn aka "Sweetie"
- Karen Colston as Kay
- Tom Lycos as Louis
- Jon Darling as Gordon
- Dorothy Barry as Flo
- Michael Lake as Bob
- Andre Pataczek as Clayton
- Jean Hadgraft as Mrs. Schneller
- Paul Livingston as Teddy Schneller
- Louise Fox as Cheryl
- Ann Merchant as Paula
- Robyn Frank as Ruth (as Robin Frank)
- Bronwyn Morgan as Sue
- Sean Fennell as Boy clerk
- Sean Callinan as Simboo

== Production ==
Campion wanted to make a low-budget contemporary feature. She came up with the character of Sweetie and she and Gerard Lee started writing in February 1987 and finished in May. The film was shot in Sydney.

For both Lemon and Colston, Sweetie was their film acting debut. Both described an immediate connection to each other as well as to Campion, akin to a sisterly relationship. The production team itself was heavily dominated by women.

== Reception ==
=== Box office ===
Sweetie grossed $337,680 at the box office in Australia.

=== Critical response ===
In Australian Film, 1978-1994, Sweetie is described as "a ghastly parody of the tyranny of family life". Roger Ebert gave the film 3½ stars out of four, writing "[Sweetie] is a story with a realistic origin, told with a fresh and bold eye...Most movies slide right through our minds without hitting anything. This one screams and shouts every step of the way".

In a 2015 review in The Guardian, Luke Buckmaster wrote, "The world of Sweetie – a beautifully strange and compelling film debut – is bent out of shape with almost intangibly subtle precision. Campion offsets what could have been a morose drama with an atmosphere that becomes increasingly, and unnervingly, mystical".

The DVD and Blu-ray editions of the film, released by The Criterion Collection, include three of Campion's earlier short films: "An Exercise in Discipline: Peel", "Passionless Moments", and "A Girl’s Own Story".

Filmmaker Carol Morley, who has called Campion her greatest influence, cited Sweetie as her favorite film on an episode of Radio 4's The Film Programme. Campion was a surprise guest on the program and said Philip French of The Observer found the film "disgusting", and an Italian outlet asked her why she had to make a film that was "so dirty".

== Restoration ==
The film was restored from original picture negatives to a digital format in 2025, and was showcased at the Melbourne International Film Festival by the National Film and Sound Archives.

== See also ==
- Cinema of Australia
