= Barry Sisters (Australian band) =

Australian country duo

The Barry Sisters
- Years active: ~1950-1963
- Members: Dorothy Davidson; Lorna Whiteside

The Barry Sisters is an Australian country music duo of Dorothy Davidson and Lorna Whiteside who became known as Dorothy and Lorna Barry. Their first releases came out billed as The Bar B-Q Girls, with songs recorded straight to disc. They were commonly featured on radio and performed on Bandstand and Six O'Clock Rock. The Allen Brothers and The Barry Sisters combined to release the single "No Hesitation" (Pye, 1961) which reached #33 on the Australian Singles Chart. The Barry Sisters own "Fly Away, Peter; Fly Away, Paul" (Pye, 1961) reached #98. They were inducted into the Tamworth Hands of Fame in 1988.

== After The Barry Sisters ==
Lorna Barry continued as a songwriter and had songs performed by Patsy Ann Noble, Jimmy Little and Val Doonican.

Dorothy Barry went on with a solo career and appeared in the 1989 film Sweetie, playing Flo, the mother of Sweetie. A song, "There's a Love That Waits For You", performed by Dorothy and written by Lorna appeared on the soundtrack. Dorothy was nominated for the 1989 AFI Award for Best Actress in a Supporting Role.

== Members ==
- Dorothy Davidson (aka Dorothy Barry)
- Lorna Whiteside (aka Lorna Barry)
