= Jane Campion =

New Zealand filmmaker (born 1954)

Dame Jane Campion DNZM
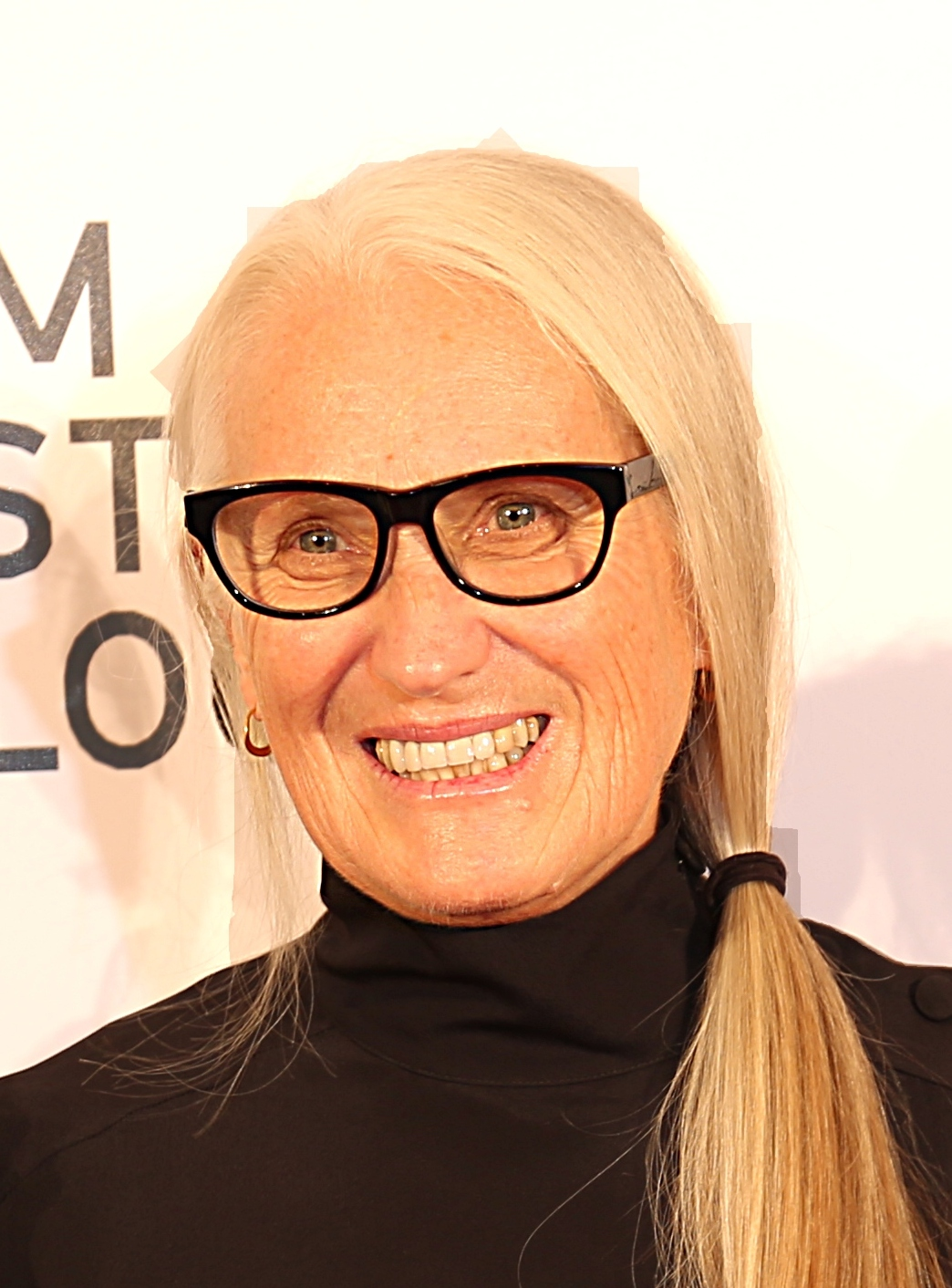
- Campion in 2017
- Born: Elizabeth Jane Campion; 30 April 1954 (age 72); Wellington, New Zealand
- Occupations: Screenwriter; producer; director
- Known for: The Piano; The Power of the Dog
- Spouse: Colin David Englert (m. 1992; div. 2001)
- Children: 2, including Alice Englert
- Parents: Richard Campion (father); Edith Campion (mother)

Dame Elizabeth Jane Campion (born April 30, 1954) is a New Zealand filmmaker whose accolades include two Academy Awards. From a feminist perspective, her films often explore themes such as female desire, sexuality, autonomy, and artistic expression, often portraying women’s pursuit of freedom and independence through their conflicts with patriarchy and tradition.

Campion is best known for writing and directing the critically acclaimed films The Piano (1993), which earned her the Academy Award for Best Original Screenplay, and The Power of the Dog (2021), which earned her the Academy Award for Best Director, becoming only the third woman to win the award (after Kathryn Bigelow and Chloé Zhao). Her other films include An Angel at My Table (1990), The Portrait of a Lady (1996), and Bright Star (2009). She co-created the television series Top of the Lake (2013-2017).

Campion was appointed a Dame Companion of the New Zealand Order of Merit (DNZM) in the 2016 New Year Honours, for her services to film.

== Early life ==
Jane Campion was born on 30 April 1954 in Wellington, New Zealand. She is the second daughter of Edith Campion (born Beverley Georgette Hannah), an actress, writer, and heiress, and Richard M. Campion, a teacher and director of theatre and opera. (Note: Attributed to multiple references:) Her maternal great-grandfather was Robert Hannah, the founder of the footwear company Hannahs, and for whom Antrim House was built. Campion's father came from a family that belonged to Exclusive Brethren, a Christian evangelical sect.

Campion attended Queen Margaret College and Wellington Girls' College. Along with her older sister and younger brother, Campion grew up in the world of New Zealand theatre; her parents founded the New Zealand Players. Campion initially rejected the idea of a career in the dramatic arts and graduated instead with a Bachelor of Arts in Anthropology from Victoria University of Wellington in 1975. The following year, she enrolled in the Chelsea Art School in London and travelled throughout Europe. She earned a graduate diploma in visual arts (focused on painting) from the Sydney College of the Arts at the University of Sydney in 1981. Campion's later film work was shaped in part by her art school education; she has cited the painter Frida Kahlo and the sculptor Joseph Beuys as influences. Campion's dissatisfaction with the limitations of painting led her to filmmaking and the creation of her first short film, Tissues, in 1980. The following year, she began studying at the Australian Film, Television and Radio School.

== Career ==
=== 1982–1989 ===
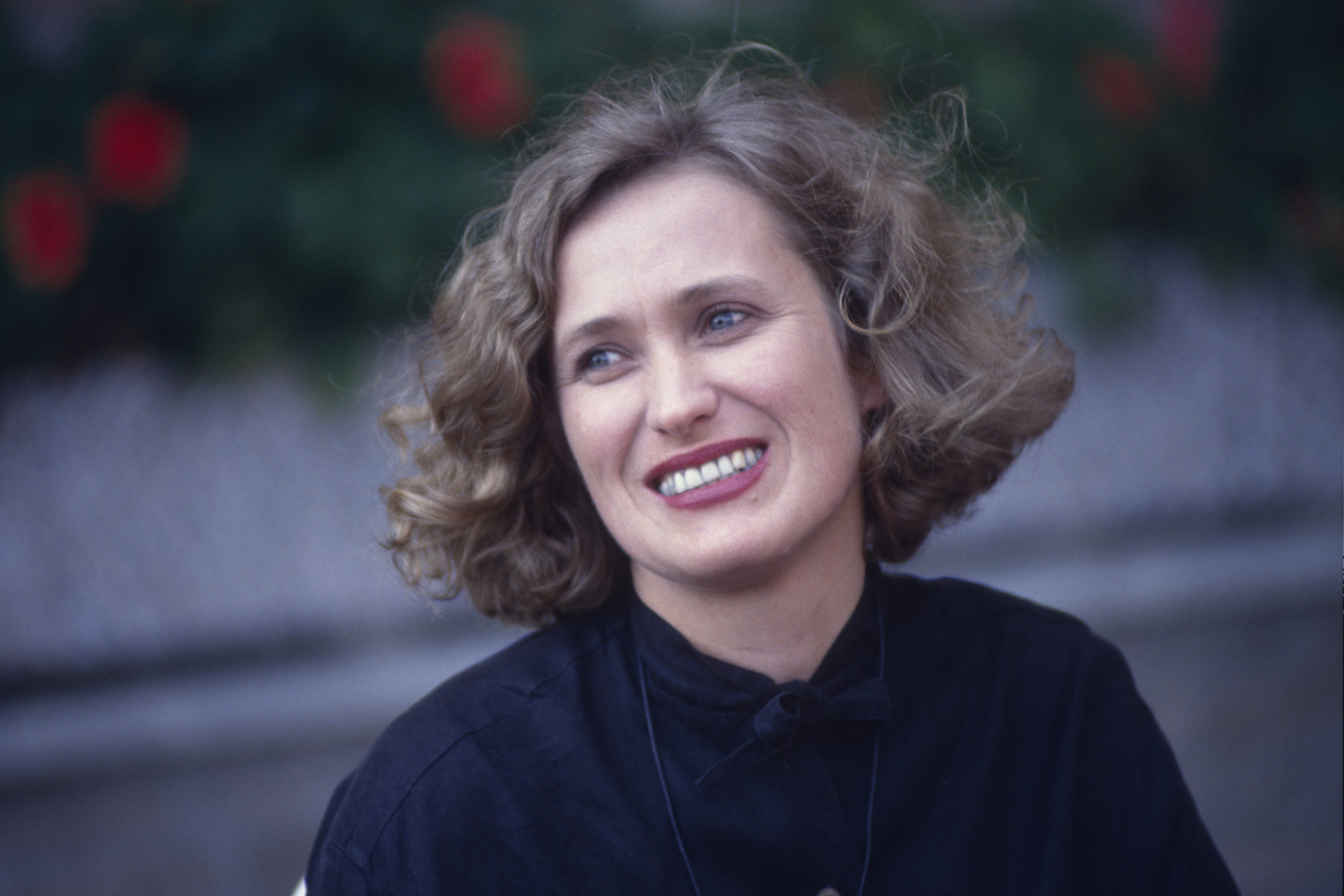
Campion at the 47th Venice International Film Festival in 1990

Campion's 1982 short film Peel won the Short Film Palme d'Or at the 1986 Cannes Film Festival, and other awards followed for her short films Passionless Moments (1983), A Girl's Own Story (1984), and After Hours (1984). After graduating from the Australian Film, Television and Radio School in 1984, she directed an episode for the ABC series Dancing Daze (1986). She then directed her first television film, Two Friends (1986), which was produced by Jan Chapman. Campion's first feature film, Sweetie (1989), won international awards.

=== 1990–2006 ===
Campion received further recognition with An Angel at My Table (1990), a biopic about the life of New Zealand writer Janet Frame, from a screenplay written by Laura Jones. Widespread recognition followed with The Piano (1993), which won the Palme d'Or at the 1993 Cannes Film Festival, Best Director from the Australian Film Institute, and an Academy Award for Best Original Screenplay in 1994. At the 66th Academy Awards, Campion was the second woman ever to be nominated for Best Director.

Campion's 1996 film The Portrait of a Lady, based on the Henry James novel, featured Nicole Kidman, John Malkovich, Barbara Hershey and Martin Donovan. Holy Smoke! (1999) saw Campion teamed with Harvey Keitel for a second time (the first being The Piano), this time with Kate Winslet as the female lead. In the Cut (2003), an erotic thriller based on Susanna Moore's bestseller, provided Meg Ryan an opportunity to depart from her more familiar onscreen persona. In 2006 she produced Abduction: The Megumi Yokota Story. Campion has also served as a faculty member of the European Graduate School in Saas-Fee, Switzerland.

=== 2009–present ===
Her 2009 film Bright Star, a biographical drama about poet John Keats (played by Ben Whishaw) and his lover Fanny Brawne (Abbie Cornish), was shown at the Cannes Film Festival. In an interview with Jan Lisa Huttner, Campion discussed how she focused on Fanny's side of the story, pointing out that only two of the film's scenes did not feature her. Campion created, wrote, and directed the TV mini-series Top of the Lake, which received near universal acclaim, won numerous awards—including, for its lead actress Elisabeth Moss, a Golden Globe Award for Best Actress – Miniseries or Television Film and a Critics' Choice Television Award for Best Actress in a Movie/Miniseries—and was nominated for the Primetime Emmy Award for Outstanding Lead Actress in a Miniseries or a Movie. Campion was also nominated for the Primetime Emmy Award for Outstanding Directing for a Miniseries, Movie or a Dramatic Special.

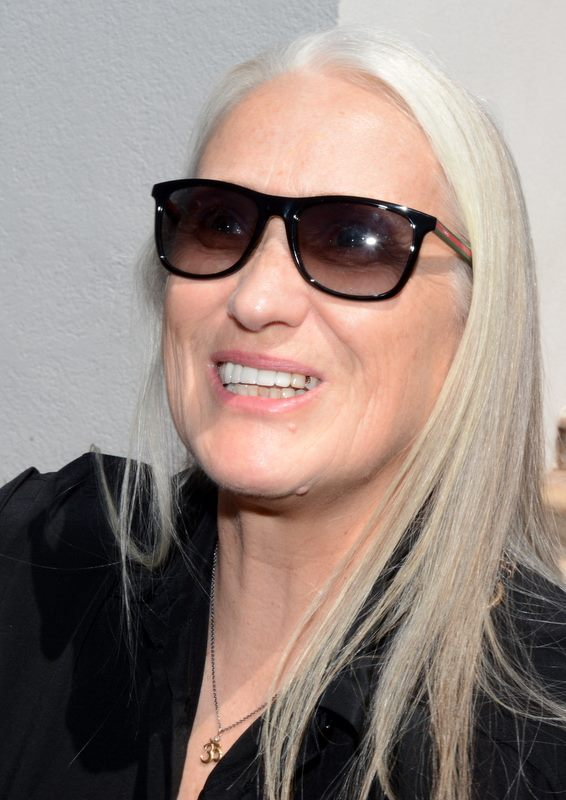
Campion in 2014

She was the head of the jury for the Cinéfondation and Short Film sections at the 2013 Cannes Film Festival and the head of the jury for the main competition section of the 2014 Cannes Film Festival. When Canadian filmmaker Xavier Dolan received the Prix du Jury for his film Mommy, he said that Campion's The Piano "made me want to write roles for women—beautiful women with soul, will and strength, not victims or objects." Campion responded by rising from her seat to give him a hug. In 2014, it was announced that Campion was nearing a deal to direct an adaptation of Rachel Kushner's novel The Flamethrowers.

In 2015, Campion confirmed that she would co-direct and co-write a second season of Top of the Lake with the story moved to Sydney and Harbour City, Hong Kong, and with Elisabeth Moss reprising her role as Robin Griffin. The sequel series titled Top of the Lake: China Girl was released in 2017. Shot and set in Sydney, Top of the Lake: China Girl features Alice Englert, Campion's daughter, in a lead role as Robin's biological daughter. The series also features Ewen Leslie, David Dencik and Nicole Kidman.

In 2019, Campion's first film in a decade was announced, an adaptation of Thomas Savage's novel The Power of the Dog. The film was written and directed by her and was released in 2021, having premiered at the 78th Venice International Film Festival, where Campion was awarded the Silver Lion for Best Direction. The film was critically acclaimed internationally, winning numerous awards and nominations for the direction, screenplay, and performance of the cast of actors. Campion earned three nominations in the respective categories for Best Director, Best Screenplay and Best Picture at the Golden Globe Awards, AACTA International Awards, Critics' Choice Movie Awards, and Satellite Awards. Campion issued an apology to Serena and Venus Williams following criticism of her acceptance speech for Critics' Choice Movie Award for Best Director, in which Campion said, "And you know, Serena and Venus, you are such marvels. However, you do not play against the guys — like I have to." Her apology included, "I made a thoughtless comment equating what I do in the film world with all that Serena Williams and Venus Williams have achieved," she said. "I did not intend to devalue these two legendary Black women and world-class athletes." In February 2022, the film received 12 nominations at the 94th Academy Awards, leading that year's Oscar nominations. The film was nominated for Best Picture, Best Director, Best Adapted Screenplay, Best Actor for Benedict Cumberbatch, Best Supporting Actress for Kirsten Dunst, and Best Supporting Actor for both Kodi Smit-McPhee and Jesse Plemons. Campion became the first woman to receive multiple Best Director nominations, and she won Best Director for the film.

In 2026, Campion served on the jury of Taormina Film Fest. While at the festival, she stated that she was actively working on her next project, which would be a musical film.

== Personal life ==
In 1992, Campion married Colin David Englert, who had worked as a second unit director on The Piano. Their son was born in 1993 and died after 12 days. Their daughter, Alice Englert, was born in 1994 and is an actress. Campion and Englert divorced in 2001.

== Reception ==
In V.W. Wexman's Jane Campion: Interviews (1999), critic David Thomson described Campion "as one of the best young directors in the world today." In Sue Gillett's "More Than Meets The Eye: The Mediation of Affects in Jane Campion's Sweetie", Campion's work is described as "perhaps the fullest and truest way of being faithful to the reality of experience"; by utilising the "unsayable" and "unseeable", she manages to catalyze audience speculation. Campion's films tend to gravitate around themes of gender politics, such as seduction and female sexual power. This has led some to label Campion's body of work as feminist; however, Rebecca Flint Marx argues that "while not inaccurate, [the feminist label] fails to fully capture the dilemmas of her characters and the depth of her work." Despite the positive feminist reputation of her work, Campion has received criticism from some feminists. Bell hooks has argued that The Piano "seduces and excites audiences with its uncritical portrayal of sexism and misogyny" and even though the film touches upon feminist tropes, it "celebrates and eroticizes male domination."

== Filmography ==
=== Feature films ===
Year	Title	Director	Writer	Producer	Notes
1986	Two Friends	Yes	No	No	Television film
1989	Sweetie	Yes	Yes	No	
1990	An Angel at My Table	Yes	No	No	
1993	The Piano	Yes	Yes	No	
1996	The Portrait of a Lady	Yes	No	No	
1999	Holy Smoke!	Yes	Yes	No	
2003	In the Cut	Yes	Yes	No	
2006	Abduction: The Megumi Yokota Story	No	No	Yes	Documentary
2009	Bright Star	Yes	Yes	Yes	
2021	The Power of the Dog	Yes	Yes	Yes	

=== Short films ===
Year	Title	Director	Writer	Producer	Notes
1980	Tissues	Yes	Yes	No	
1981	Mishaps of Seduction and Conquest	Yes	Yes	No	
1982	Peel: An Exercise in Discipline	Yes	Yes	No	
1983	Passionless Moments	Yes	Yes	Yes	
1984	A Girl's Own Story	Yes	Yes	No	
1984	After Hours	Yes	Yes	No	
2006	The Water Diary	Yes	Yes	No	Segment of 8
2007	The Lady Bug	Yes	Yes	No	Segment of To Each His Own Cinema
2012	I'm the One	No	No	Yes	
2016	Family Happiness	No	No	Yes	

=== Television ===
Year	Title	Director	Writer	Producer	Notes
2013	Top of the Lake	Yes	Yes	Yes	Miniseries; co-directed with Garth Davis
2017	Top of the Lake: China Girl	Yes	Yes	Yes	Miniseries; co-directed with Ariel Kleiman

== Recurring collaborators ==
Work Actor	1986	1989	1990	1993	1996	1999	1999	2003	2009	2013	2017	2021
Work Actor	Two Friends (TV)	Sweetie	An Angel at My Table	The Piano	The Portrait of a Lady	Holy Smoke	Soft Fruit	In the Cut	Bright Star	Top of the Lake (S1)	Top of the Lake (S2)	The Power of the Dog
Roger Ashton-Griffiths					Yes				Yes			
Kerry Fox			Yes						Yes			
Paul Goddard						Yes					Yes	
Holly Hunter				Yes						Yes		
Harvey Keitel				Yes		Yes						
Nicole Kidman					Yes			Yes			Yes	
Genevieve Lemon		Yes		Yes		Yes	Yes			Yes		Yes
Elisabeth Moss										Yes	Yes	
Kerry Walker				Yes		Yes						

== Honours and accolades ==
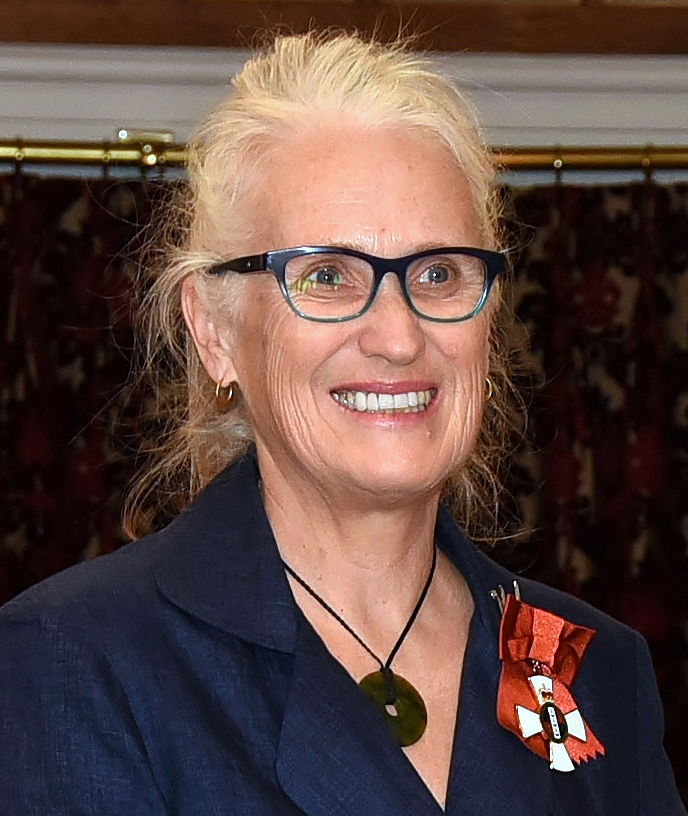
Jane Campion was appointed a Dame Companion of the New Zealand Order of Merit (DNZM) in the 2016 New Year Honours, for services to film.

Her accolades throughout her career including two Academy Awards, two BAFTA Awards, two Golden Globe Awards, and a Silver Lion award, and nominations of three Primetime Emmy Awards. Campion's direction of The Power of the Dog (2021) earned her second Best Director nomination, becoming the first woman to receive multiple Best Director nominations. She also won her first Best Director award, becoming the third female director to win the award.

As of 2026, Campion is the only filmmaker to win both Short Film Palme d'Or (for Peel) and the feature film Palme d'Or (for The Piano) at the Cannes Film Festival, both were pioneered as the first female filmmaker to achieve both awards.

Campion was appointed a Dame Companion of the New Zealand Order of Merit (DNZM) in the 2016 New Year Honours, for services to film.

== See also ==
- Women's cinema
- List of New Zealand Academy Award winners and nominees
- List of New Zealand film makers

== Bibliography ==
- Cheshire, Ellen: Jane Campion. London: Pocket Essentials, 2000.
- Fox, Alistair: Jane Campion: Authorship and Personal Cinema. Bloomington–Indianapolis: Indiana University Press, 2011. ISBN 978-0-253-22301-2.
- Gillett, Sue: 'Views for Beyond the Mirror: The Films of Jane Campion.' St.Kilda: ATOM, 2004. ISBN 1 876467 14 2
- Hester, Elizabeth J.: Jane Campion: A Selective Annotated Bibliography of Dissertations and Theses. ISBN 978-1484818381, ISBN 1484818385.
- Jones, Gail: 'The Piano.' Australian Screen Classics, Currency Press, 2007.
- Margolis, Harriet (ed): 'Jane Campion's The Piano.' Cambridge University Press, 2000.
- McHugh, Kathleen: 'Jane Campion.'Urbana and Chicago: University of Illinois Press, 2007.
- Radner, Hilary, Alistair Fox and Irène Bessière (eds): 'Jane Campion: Cinema, Nation, Identity.'Detroit: Wayne State University Press, 2009.
- Verhoeven, Deb: Jane Campion. London: Routledge, 2009.
- Wexman V.W.: Jane Campion: Interviews. Roundhouse Publishing. 1999.
