= Tanya Seghatchian =

British film producer

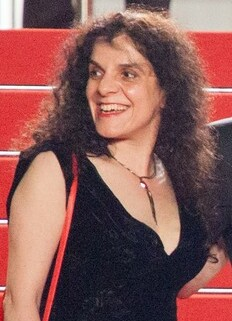
- Seghatchian in 2018
- Occupation: Producer

Tanya Seghatchian is a British-Armenian film producer.

== Education ==
Seghatchian attended Cambridge University and was a member of the Footlights. She became joint vice-president in 1989 with Henry Naylor as president.

== Career ==
Seghatchian previously worked for the BBC. She was a co-producer and then executive producer for the first four Harry Potter films, the BAFTA-winning My Summer of Love and the film adaptation of The Curious Incident of the Dog in the Night-Time, which was due out in 2007.

She was appointed Head of the Development Fund at the UK Film Council before becoming head of its film fund in 2010. During her tenure, it provided funding for successful films including The King's Speech and Bright Star. She oversaw the merger of the council with the British Film Institute and briefly served as the newly merged institution's head of film fund before resigning in September 2011 to concentrate on her production work.
