= Luke Davies bibliography =

Bibliography of Australian writer Luke Davies

List of the published work of Luke Davies, Australian writer.

== Novels ==
- Davies, Luke (1997). Candy. Sydney: Allen & Unwin.
- — (1998). Candy (1st UK ed.). London: Vintage Books.
- Candy: A Novel of Love and Addiction (Ballantine Books, New York 1998) ISBN 0-345-42387-9
- Isabelle the Navigator (Allen & Unwin Publishers, Sydney 2000)
- Isabelle the Navigator (Berkley Books, New York 2002) ISBN 0-425-18604-0
- God of Speed (Allen and Unwin, 2008), about Howard Hughes

== Children's books ==
- Magpie (HarperCollins Publishers Australia, Sydney 2010) ISBN 0733322689

== Screenplays ==
- Candy (co-written with Neil Armfield; 2006)
- Air (short film; also directed; 2009)
- Reclaim (co-written with Carmine Gaeta; 2014)
- Life (2015)
- Lion (2016)
- Beautiful Boy (co-written with Felix Van Groeningen; 2018)
- Catch-22 (miniseries; 2019)
- Angel of Mine (co-written with David Regal; 2019)
- News of the World (co-written with Paul Greengrass; 2020)

== Poetry ==
- Four plots for magnets (Glandular Press, 1982) ISBN 0-9594130-3-0
- Absolute event horizon : poems (Angus & Robertson, 1994) ISBN 0-207-18402-X
- Running with light : poems (Allen & Unwin, 1999) ISBN 1-86508-012-8
- The Entire History of Architecture and Other Love Poems (Vagabond Press, 2001)
- Totem : Totem poem plus 40 love poems (Allen & Unwin, 2004)
- Interferon psalms: 33 psalms on the 99 names of God (Allen & Unwin, 2011) ISBN 978-1-74237-034-7
- The Feral Aphorisms (Vagabond Press, 2011)
- Four plots for magnets (Pitt Street Poetry reissue with additional material, 2013) ISBN 978-1-922080-12-7

== Selected articles ==
- Davies, Luke (April 2007). "Extravagant Stillness: Philip Gröning's 'Into Great Silence'". The Monthly. 22.
- — (March 2008). "Heath Ledger, 1979–2008". The Monthly. 32.
- — (September 2008). "The Penalty is Death". The Monthly. 38.
- — (March 2009). "Tales of the City". The Monthly. 43: 64–66. Film review of Milk, directed by Gus Van Sant.
- — (April 2009). "Snow falling on vampires". The Monthly. 44: 66–68. Film review of Tomas Alfredson's Let the right one in.
- — (August 2014). "Not your Mother Country". Arts & Letters. Film. The Monthly. 103: 54–55. Reviews Rolf de Heer's Charlie's Country and Iain Forsyth and Jane Pollard's 20,000 Days on Earth.
