= List of awards and nominations received by Heath Ledger =

Heath Ledger awards and nominations
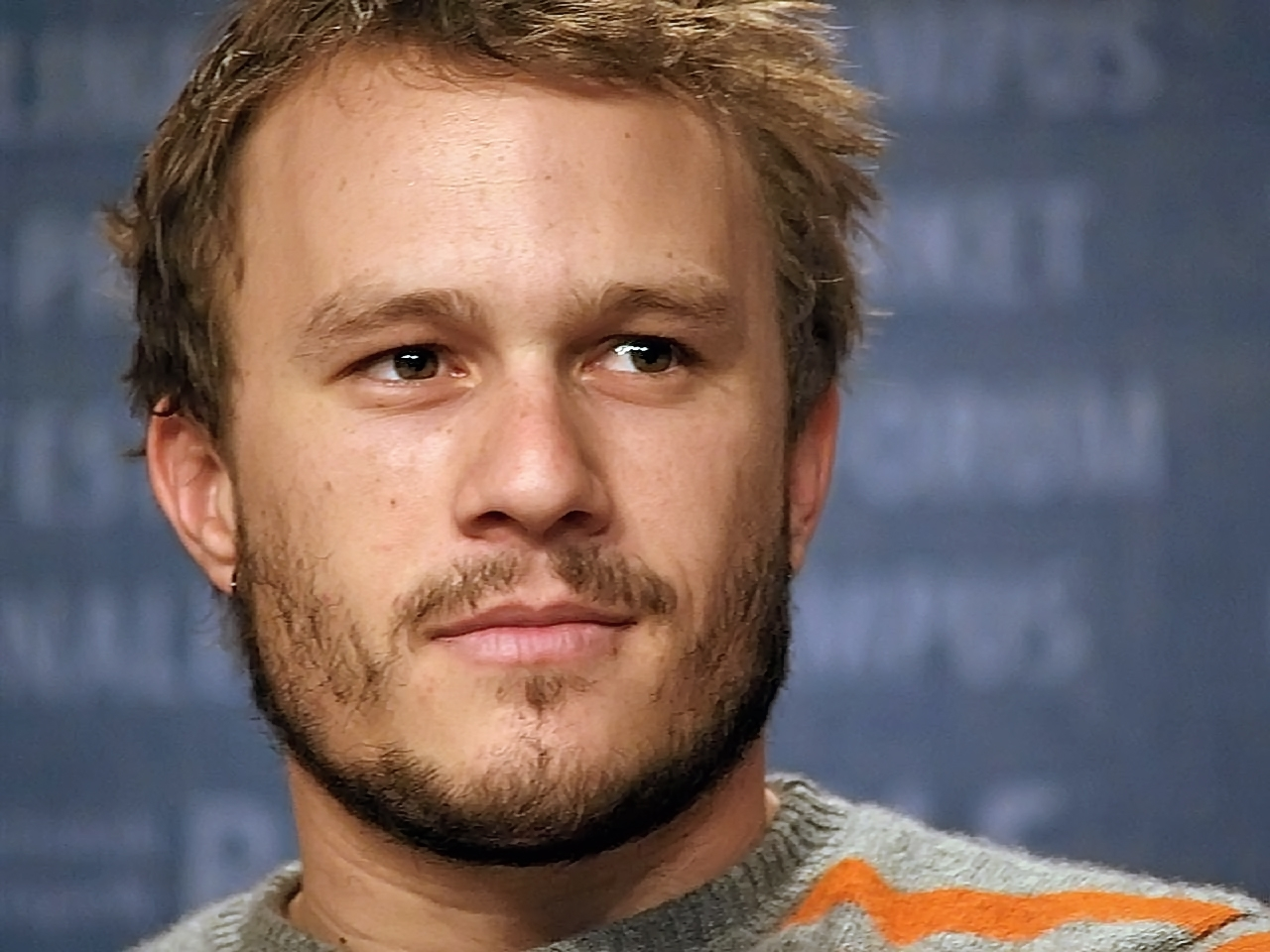
Awards and nominations
Award	Wins	Nominations
Academy Awards	1	2
Australian Film Institute Awards	3	3
Boston Society of Film Critics	1	1
Brisbane International Film Festival	1	1
British Academy Film Awards	1	2
Broadcast Film Critics	1	3
Chicago Film Critics Association	1	2
Dallas-Fort Worth Film Critics Association Award	1	1
Film Critics Circle of Australia	0	3
Florida Film Critics Circle Award	1	1
Golden Globe Awards	1	2
Independent Spirit Awards	1	2
Inside Film Awards	0	1
Kansas City Film Critics Circle	1	1
Las Vegas Film Critics Society	2	2
Las Vegas Film Critics Society	1	1
London Film Critics' Circle	0	2
Los Angeles Film Critics Association	1	1
New York Film Critics	1	1
Online Film Critics Society	1	1
People's Choice Awards	3	3
Phoenix Film Critics Society	2	2
San Francisco Film Critics Circle	2	2
Santa Barbara International Film Festival	1	1
Satellite Awards	0	2
Saturn Awards	1	1
Scream Awards	2	2
Screen Actors Guild Award	1	3
Toronto Film Critics Association	1	1
Washington D.C. Area Film Critics Association	1	2

Totals (Note: Certain award groups do not simply award one winner. They acknowledge several different recipients, have runners-up, and have third place. Since this is a specific recognition and is different from losing an award, runner-up mentions are considered wins in this award tally. For simplification and to avoid errors, each award in this list has been presumed to have had a prior nomination.)
- Wins: 36
- Nominations: 58

Heath Ledger (1979–2008), was an Australian film actor whose career lasted more than 16 years. Ledger received acclaim for his acting in the Australian crime film Two Hands (1999), receiving nominations at the Australian Film Institute (AFI) and Film Critics Circle of Australia in the categories for Best Actor. After starring in the 2001 films A Knight's Tale and Monster's Ball, Ledger was cast as the title character in the 2003 biographical film Ned Kelly for which he received his second AFI and Film Critics Circle award nominations.

Ledger's breakthrough performance as Ennis Del Mar in the 2005 film adaptation of Brokeback Mountain earned him nominations for an Academy Award, a BAFTA Award, a Golden Globe Award, and a Screen Actors Guild Award, all for Best Actor in a Leading Role. At age 26, he became the ninth-youngest Academy Award Best Actor nominee at the time. In addition, Ledger received recognition from several North American critics' associations, winning the 2005 Las Vegas Film Critics Society, New York Film Critics Circle, Phoenix Film Critics Society, and San Francisco Film Critics Circle awards, as Best Actor. In 2006, he starred in the Australian romantic drama Candy, and was nominated in the category of Best Actor at the AFI, Film Critics Circle, and Inside Film awards ceremony.

Following his death on 22 January 2008, Ledger received numerous posthumous awards and honours. He shared the 2007 Independent Spirit Robert Altman Award with the rest of the ensemble cast for the 2007 biographical film I'm Not There. In his penultimate film performance, Ledger was nominated and awarded for his portrayal of the Joker in The Dark Knight (2008). His wins include an Academy Award, BAFTA, Golden Globe Award, and Screen Actors Guild Award for Best Supporting Actor. Ledger also won the Best Actor International Award at the 2008 AFI Awards ceremony, for which he became the first actor to win an award posthumously. In August 2008, Ledger was posthumously honoured at the Brisbane International Film Festival with the Chauvel Award in recognition of his contribution to the Australian film industry.

== Major associations ==
=== Academy Awards ===
Year	Category	Nominated work	Result	Ref.
2006	Best Actor	Brokeback Mountain	Nominated	
2009	Best Supporting Actor	The Dark Knight	Won	

=== BAFTA Awards ===
Year	Category	Nominated work	Result	Ref.
2006	Best Actor in a Leading Role	Brokeback Mountain	Nominated	
2009	Best Actor in a Supporting Role	The Dark Knight	Won	

=== Critics' Choice Awards ===
Year	Category	Nominated work	Result	Ref.
2006	Best Actor	Brokeback Mountain	Nominated	
2009	Best Supporting Actor	The Dark Knight	Won	
2009	Best Cast	The Dark Knight	Nominated	

=== Golden Globe Awards ===
Year	Category	Nominated work	Result	Ref.
2006	Best Actor – Motion Picture Drama	Brokeback Mountain	Nominated	
2009	Best Supporting Actor – Motion Picture	The Dark Knight	Won	

=== Screen Actors Guild Awards ===
Year	Category	Nominated work	Result	Ref.
2006	Outstanding Cast in a Motion Picture	Brokeback Mountain	Nominated	
2006	Outstanding Actor in a Leading Role	Brokeback Mountain	Nominated	
2009	Outstanding Actor in a Supporting Role	The Dark Knight	Won	

== Miscellaneous awards ==
Organizations	Year	Category	Work	Result	Ref.
Australian Film Institute Awards	1999	Best Actor in a Leading Role	Two Hands	Nominated	
Australian Film Institute Awards	2003	Best Actor in a Leading Role	Ned Kelly	Nominated	
Australian Film Institute Awards	2006	Best International Actor	Brokeback Mountain	Won	
Australian Film Institute Awards	2006	Reader's Choice Award for Best Actor	Brokeback Mountain	Won	
Australian Film Institute Awards	2006	Best Actor in a Leading Role	Candy	Nominated	
Australian Film Institute Awards	2008	Best International Actor	The Dark Knight	Won	
Brisbane International Film Festival	2008	Chauvel Award	—N/a	Won	
Independent Spirit Awards	2005	Best Male Lead	Brokeback Mountain	Nominated	
Independent Spirit Awards	2008	Robert Altman Award	I'm Not There	Won	
Inside Film Awards	2006	Best Actor	Brokeback Mountain	Nominated	
People's Choice Awards	2009	Best Ensemble Cast	The Dark Knight	Won	
People's Choice Awards	2009	Best Onscreen Match-up	The Dark Knight	Won	
Satellite Awards	2005	Outstanding Actor in a Motion Picture – Drama	Brokeback Mountain	Nominated	
Satellite Awards	2008	Best Supporting Actor in a Motion Picture	The Dark Knight	Nominated	
Saturn Awards	2009	Best Supporting Actor	The Dark Knight	Won	
Scream Awards	2008	Best Fantasy Actor	The Dark Knight	Won	
Scream Awards	2008	Best Villain	The Dark Knight	Won	

== Critic awards ==
Organizations	Year	Category	Work	Result	Ref.
African-American Film Critics Association	2008	Best Supporting Actor	The Dark Knight	Won	
Austin Film Critics Association	2008	Best Supporting Actor	The Dark Knight	Won	
Boston Society of Film Critics	2008	Best Supporting Actor	The Dark Knight	Won	
Chicago Film Critics Association	2005	Best Actor	Brokeback Mountain	Nominated	
Chicago Film Critics Association	2008	Best Supporting Actor	The Dark Knight	Won	
Dallas-Fort Worth Film Critics Association	2005	Best Actor	Brokeback Mountain	Nominated	
Dallas-Fort Worth Film Critics Association	2008	Best Supporting Actor	The Dark Knight	Won	
Film Critics Circle of Australia	1999	Best Actor in a Leading Role	Two Hands	Nominated	
Film Critics Circle of Australia	2003	Best Actor in a Leading Role	Ned Kelly	Nominated	
Film Critics Circle of Australia	2006	Best Actor in a Leading Role	Candy	Nominated	
Florida Film Critics Circle	2008	Best Supporting Actor	The Dark Knight	Won	
Iowa Film Critics Awards	2008	Best Supporting Actor	The Dark Knight	Won	
Kansas City Film Critics Awards	2008	Best Supporting Actor	The Dark Knight	Won	
London Film Critics' Circle	2005	Actor of the Year	Brokeback Mountain	Nominated	
London Film Critics' Circle	2008	Actor of the Year	The Dark Knight	Nominated	
Los Angeles Film Critics Association	2005	Best Actor	Brokeback Mountain	Nominated	
Los Angeles Film Critics Association	2008	Best Supporting Actor	The Dark Knight	Won	
New York Film Critics Circle Awards	2005	Best Actor	Brokeback Mountain	Won	
New York Film Critics Circle Awards	2008	Best Supporting Actor	The Dark Knight	Nominated	
Online Film Critics Society Awards	2006	Best Actor	Brokeback Mountain	Nominated	
Online Film Critics Society Awards	2009	Best Supporting Actor	The Dark Knight	Won	
San Diego Film Critics Society	2008	Best Supporting Actor	The Dark Knight	Won	
San Francisco Film Critics Circle	2005	Best Actor	Brokeback Mountain	Won	
San Francisco Film Critics Circle	2008	Best Supporting Actor	The Dark Knight	Won	
Santa Barbara International Film Festival	2006	Outstanding Performance of the Year Award	Brokeback Mountain	Won	
Southeastern Film Critics Association	2005	Best Actor	Brokeback Mountain	Nominated	
Southeastern Film Critics Association	2008	Best Supporting Actor	The Dark Knight	Won	
St. Louis Gateway Film Critics Association	2005	Best Actor	Brokeback Mountain	Won	
St. Louis Gateway Film Critics Association	2008	Best Supporting Actor	The Dark Knight	Won	
Toronto Film Critics Association	2008	Best Supporting Actor	The Dark Knight	Won	
Vancouver Film Critics Circle	2005	Best Actor	Brokeback Mountain	Nominated	
Vancouver Film Critics Circle	2008	Best Supporting Actor	The Dark Knight	Won	
Washington D.C. Area Film Critics Association	2005	Best Actor	Brokeback Mountain	Nominated	
Washington D.C. Area Film Critics Association	2008	Best Supporting Actor	The Dark Knight	Won	

== See also ==
- List of oldest and youngest Academy Award winners and nominees – Youngest nominees for Best Actor in a Leading Role
- List of Australian Academy Award winners and nominees
- List of actors with Academy Award nominations
- List of actors with two or more Academy Award nominations in acting categories
- List of posthumous Academy Award winners and nominees

== Notes ==
^IShared with rest of the ensemble cast, director, and casting director of I'm Not There
^IIShared with rest of the ensemble cast of Brokeback Mountain
^IIIShared with rest of the ensemble cast of The Dark Knight
^IVShared with Christian Bale
