= Posthumous award =

Award granted after death

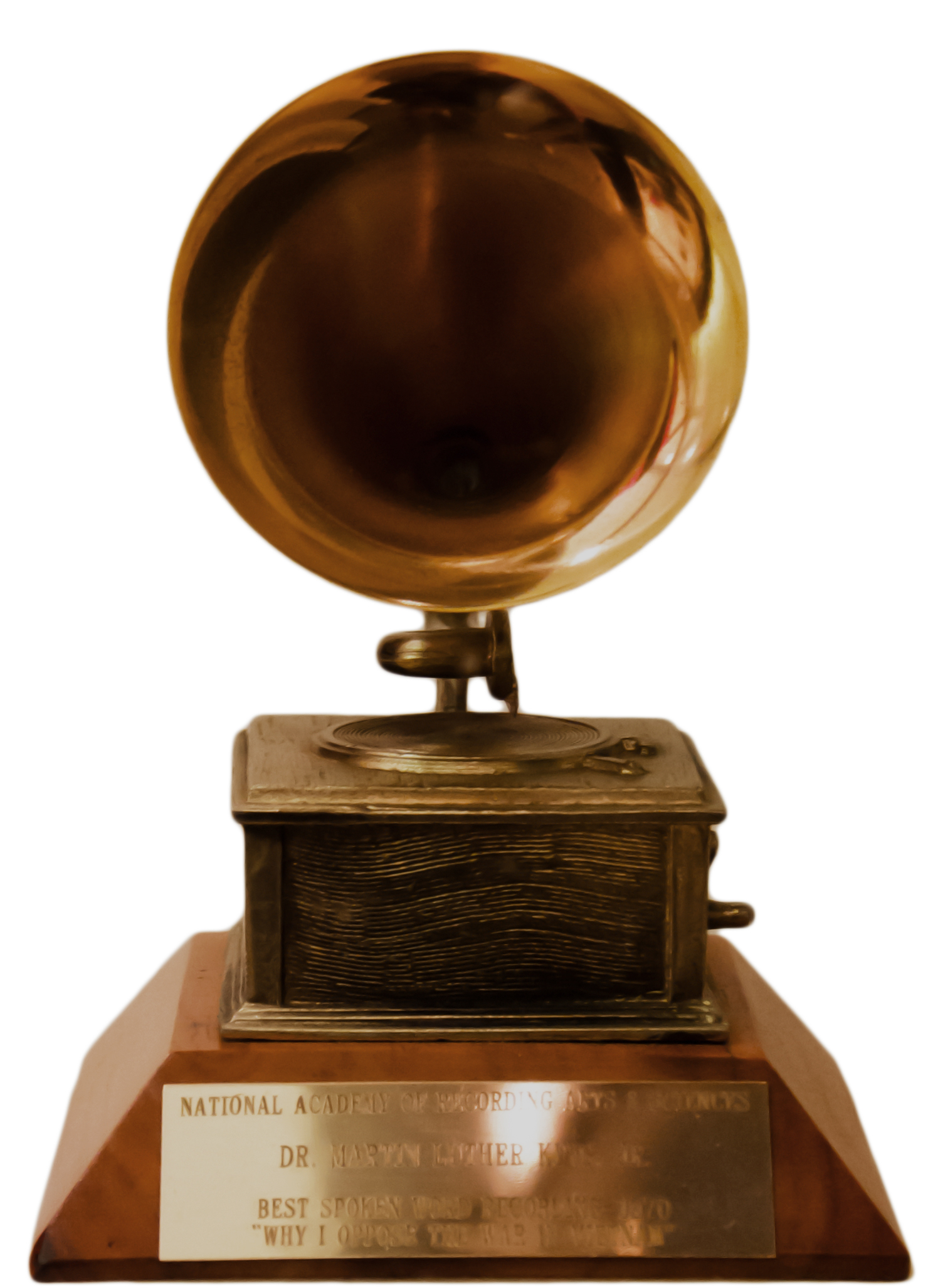
An example of a posthumous accolade: the Grammy Award for Best Spoken Word Album for Martin Luther King Jr.

A posthumous award is an award that is granted after the recipient has died. Many prizes, medals, and awards can be granted posthumously.

== Military decorations ==
Military decorations, such as the Medal of Honor, are often given posthumously. The title Hero of the Soviet Union was posthumously given, but the Gold Star medal was not awarded itself. During World War II, many countries practiced the granting of posthumous awards.

In the Soviet Union, the only posthumous award that was physically awarded was the Order of the Patriotic War. All other awards were not physically awarded. Until 1977, upon the death of an awardee, all medals and awards were returned.

Less commonly, certain prizes, medals, and awards are granted only posthumously, especially those that honor people who died in service to a particular cause. Such awards include the Confederate Medal of Honor award, to Confederate veterans who distinguished themselves conspicuously during the American Civil War (1861–1865), and the Dag Hammarskjöld Medal, to military personnel, police, or civilians who died while serving in a United Nations peacekeeping operation.

== Other fields ==
Sports awards and titles can be awarded posthumously, for example 1970 Formula One champion Jochen Rindt, who died in a crash late in the season, but still had enough points to be named champion.

Australian actor Heath Ledger won many awards after his death in 2008, particularly concerning his performance as The Joker in the film The Dark Knight.

== See also ==
- Lists of awards
- List of people who achieved posthumous recognition
