= Austin Film Critics Association Awards 2008 =

Film awards

4th AFCA Awards

Best Film:
The Dark Knight

The 4th Austin Film Critics Association Awards, honoring the best in filmmaking for 2008, were announced on December 16, 2008.

== Top 10 Films ==
1. The Dark Knight
2. Slumdog Millionaire
3. Milk
4. Synecdoche, New York
5. The Curious Case of Benjamin Button
6. The Wrestler
7. WALL-E
8. Frost/Nixon
9. Let the Right One In (Låt den rätte komma in)
10. Gran Torino

== Winners ==
- Best Film:
  - The Dark Knight
- Best Director:
  - Christopher Nolan – The Dark Knight
- Best Actor:
  - Sean Penn – Milk
- Best Actress:
  - Anne Hathaway – Rachel Getting Married
- Best Supporting Actor:
  - Heath Ledger – The Dark Knight
- Best Supporting Actress:
  - Taraji P. Henson – The Curious Case of Benjamin Button
- Best Original Screenplay:
  - Synecdoche, New York – Charlie Kaufman
- Best Adapted Screenplay:
  - The Dark Knight – Jonathan Nolan and Christopher Nolan
- Best Cinematography:
  - The Fall – Colin Watkinson
- Best Original Score:
  - The Dark Knight – James Newton Howard and Hans Zimmer
- Best Foreign Language Film:
  - Let the Right One In (Låt den rätte komma in) • Sweden
- Best Documentary:
  - Man on Wire
- Best Animated Feature:
  - WALL-E
- Best First Film:
  - Nacho Vigalondo – Timecrimes (Los cronocrímenes)
- Breakthrough Artist Award:
  - Danny McBride – The Foot Fist Way, Pineapple Express, and Tropic Thunder
- Austin Film Award:
  - Crawford – David Modigliani
