= Life (2015 film) =

2015 film

- Theatrical release poster
- Directed by: Anton Corbijn
- Screenplay by: Luke Davies
- Produced by: Iain Canning; Christina Piovesan; Emile Sherman; Benito Mueller; Wolfgang Mueller
- Starring: Robert Pattinson; Dane DeHaan; Joel Edgerton; Alessandra Mastronardi; Stella Schnabel; Ben Kingsley
- Cinematography: Charlotte Bruus Christensen
- Edited by: Nick Fenton
- Music by: Owen Pallett
- Production companies: Barry Films Production; First Generation Films; See-Saw Films; Corner Piece Capital; Cross City Sales; Entertainment One; Film4; FilmNation Entertainment; The Harold Greenberg Fund; Screen Australia; Telefilm Canada
- Distributed by: SquareOne Entertainment; Universum Film (Germany); Transmission Films (Australia); Cinedigm (United States); Entertainment One (United Kingdom)
- Release dates: 9 February 2015 (Berlin); 9 September 2015 (France); 4 December 2015 (United States)
- Running time: 111 minutes
- Countries: Canada; Germany; Australia; United States; United Kingdom
- Language: English
- Budget: $10–15 million
- Box office: $1.2 million

Life is a 2015 biographical drama film directed by Anton Corbijn and written by Luke Davies. It is based on the friendship of Life photographer Dennis Stock and American actor James Dean, starring Robert Pattinson as Stock and Dane DeHaan as Dean.

The film is an American, British, German, Canadian and Australian co-production, produced by Iain Canning and Emile Sherman from See-Saw Films and Christina Piovesan from First Generation Films with co-financed by Barry Films Production.

Production took place from February to April 2014 in Toronto and Los Angeles. The film had its premiere at 65th Berlin International Film Festival, at Berlinale Special Gala at the Zoo Palast on 9 February 2015. In the United States, it was released through a simultaneous limited theatrical release and video on demand on 4 December 2015 by Cinedigm.

== Synopsis ==
The story follows Dennis Stock, who works at the Magnum Photos Agency and gets an assignment to shoot rising Hollywood star James Dean, before the release of East of Eden. Friendship developed between them during the assignment, as the pair traveled from Los Angeles to New York City to Indiana.

== Cast ==
- Robert Pattinson as Dennis Stock
- Dane DeHaan as James Dean
- Ben Kingsley as Jack L. Warner
- Joel Edgerton as John G. Morris
- Alessandra Mastronardi as Anna Maria Pierangeli
- Stella Schnabel as Norma
- Michael Therriault as Elia Kazan
- Kristen Hager as Veronica
- Kelly McCreary as Eartha Kitt
- Eva Fisher as Judy Garland
- Jack Fulton as Rodney Stock, Dennis's son
- Kasey Lea as Marcus "Markie" Winslow Jr., Dean's cousin
- Peter Lucas as Nicholas Ray
- Lauren Gallagher as Natalie Wood
- John Blackwood as Raymond Massey
- Kristian Bruun as Roger
- Caitlin Stewart as Julie Harris
- Nicholas Rice as Lee Strasberg
- Phil Hayes as Marshall
- Eve Crawford as Aunt Ortense
- Ron White as Uncle Marcus

== Production ==
=== Development ===
With Life is first and foremost a story about a photographer, Dennis Stock (Robert Pattinson), who profiled James Dean (DeHaan). So it is the story of a photographer and their subject. As a photographer that story interested me: studying the power balance between a photographer and their subject.

— Anton Corbijn, director of Life, on the film.

Luke Davies started writing the script in 2010. He was initially interested to write a script about James Dean but as he researched about Dean, he found that the one thing which stood out most was Dean's images at Times Square by Dennis Stock. Afterwards, Davies found more about Stock and wrote the screenplay for the film. Corbijn initially turned down the offer to make biopic on James Dean. But the story of the photographer Dennis Stock interested him more as "(the photographer and the subject) You know, who influences who? The James Dean portion of the story wasn't my interest."

=== Casting ===
Talking about the casting, Corbijn said that "Rob has an intensity that I think Dennis would have. When I see Rob, I see an inner turmoil that is great for the role and Dane is really interesting. He has a beautiful face, but it's a hard face to grasp. It's hard to see how Dane reads [on screen] sometimes, and the same goes for James Dean." Corbijn later revealed that "Rob was quickly on the horizon for me, and after we met I didn't meet anyone else for that (Dennis Stock's) role." While producers Iain Canning and Emile Sherman said that "Finding the right actor to play James Dean was a big responsibility, but Dane's body of work has proved what a chameleon he is and what he will contribute to the role" and further added that "Casting Robert Pattinson and Dane DeHaan brings together two of the most exciting young actors of their generation." Talking about portraying James Dean, DeHaan said that "He had a very specific voice so I've gotta have it, too! It's a challenge. His voice was a lot higher than mine, but it's fun, you know, that's what I like to do. The harder it is, the more fun it is, but it's definitely a challenge, for sure."

Pattinson said about his character in the film, "He's a really bad dad. And you don't really see that in young guy parts. He just doesn't love his kid, or is incapable of it, and it kind of pains him." About the interaction between the main characters he said, "It's a little ego battle, and a lot of it is about professional jealousy, and who's a better artist, who's the subject and who's the artist." And added that's what drew him to the role in the film.

In February 2014, Ben Kingsley joined the cast as president of the Warner Bros. Studios, Jack L. Warner. Writer Luke Davies joined the film in cameo appearance. On 14 March 2014, it was announced that Joel Edgerton has joined the cast of the film as Magnum Photography editor John G. Morris. Initially Corbijn offered Philip Seymour Hoffman, with whom he previously worked on A Most Wanted Man, the role of John G. Morris (later played by Edgerton) in the film, which according to Corbijn, "(Hoffman was) trying to find a way to make it work" due to his earlier commitments, but he died before filming began. Edgerton, about his involvement in the film, said that "It was a situation where it was never going to be something I was involved in but for certain circumstances. They lost an actor, I love these people, I love everything they're about, the story and script was really fascinating. So I left working on Jeff Nichols's movie in New Orleans and just scooted across to Toronto literally for three days and shot five, six scenes. It was a blast."

=== Filming ===
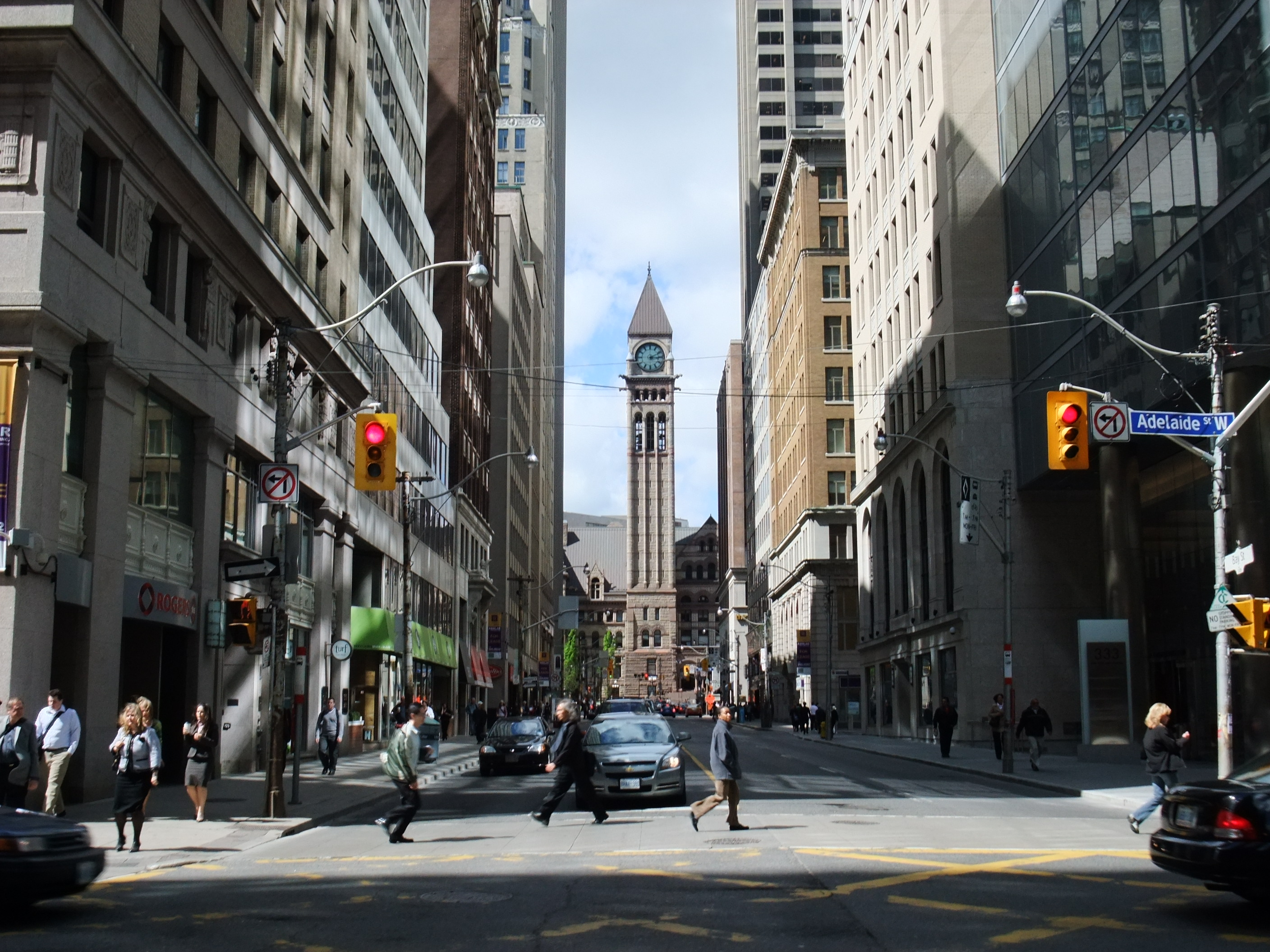
Bay Street in Toronto was used as a filming location.

Principal photography began on 18 February 2014 in Toronto, Ontario, Canada and continued till 27 March 2014. Pattinson filmed a scene in snow in Toronto on 18 February 2014. On 20 February 2014, filming took place at 33rd Maitland Street in Toronto. Filming took place inside and outside of a building in Downtown Toronto on 21 February 2014 with Pattinson, Kingsley and DeHaan. Pattinson and DeHaan filmed scenes at the farm outside of Toronto on 26 February – 1 March 2014. On 4 March 2014, filming took place downtown Millbrook near Peterborough at King Street, which was transformed into the 1950s era and at the Pastry Peddler shop which was transformed into a 1950s shoe store. A rainy scene was shot in downtown Toronto on 7 March 2014. On 8 March 2014, filming took place at Bay Street in downtown Toronto, which was transformed into 1950s New York City street. On 11 March 2014, Pattinson and DeHaan shot a motorcycle riding scene in Toronto, on a bike resembling a 1955 Trophy Triumph, James Dean's bike. On 15 March 2014, filming took place at Victoria and King streets in downtown Toronto with Pattinson and Edgerton. Scenes shot at 71 Gloucester Street Toronto on 20 March 2014.

After Toronto, filming moved to Los Angeles, California. Filming took place at Chateau Marmont on 30 March 2014. On 31 March 2014, scenes were shot at Pantages Theatre, which was transformed as it was at the premiere of 1954 film A Star Is Born. Filming finally wrapped up on 1 April 2014.

Producer Christina Piovesan talking about the outdoor filming said, "There's a huge section that takes place exterior on a farm, and Rob and Dane are in period costumes that are so slight while the crew were covered from head to toe with only eyes showing. They were such troopers to be shooting with Anton in this brutal weather. The environment was hostile, but you can't tell when you watch it, and that's a testament to how professional they are."

== Promotion and marketing ==
Entertainment Weekly released the first image of Pattinson and DeHaan as Stock and Dean in the film on 6 March 2014. In September 2013, Transmission Films acquired the Australian distribution rights of the film. On 9 February 2015, after its premiere at Berlinale, a scene featuring Pattinson and DeHaan was released. On 12 August 2015, official trailer of the film was released.

=== Releases ===
The film was shown at Guanajuato International Film Festival as a part of the gala event on 24 July 2015. On 5 September 2015, it premièred at Deauville American Film Festival. It was also screened at Sitges Film Festival in October 2015.

The film had a theatrical release in France on 9 September 2015. It had a premiere in Belgium, which was attended by Corbijn on 21 September 2015. In Germany, the film was released on 24 September 2015. In UK, the film was released on 25 September 2015. Cinedigm acquired the distribution rights of the film in United States and released the film in a limited release and through video on demand on 4 December 2015.

== Reception ==
The film received mixed to positive reviews from the critics, with Pattinson and DeHaan receiving praise for their portrayals of Stock and Dean. Review aggregator Rotten Tomatoes gives the film a 64% "Fresh" rating based on reviews from 61 critics, with an average score of 6.2/10. The website's critics consensus reads: "Life may frustrate viewers seeking a James Dean biopic with its subject's intensity, but it remains a diverting, well-acted effort assembled with admirable craft and ambition." Metacritic gives the film a score of 59 based on reviews from 9 critics, indicating "mixed or average" reviews.

Tim Robey of The Daily Telegraph gave the film four out of five stars by saying that "it's an interestingly personal picture about that moment when the shutter snaps, and how it changes the nature of any human interaction" and about performances that "the underrated Pattinson is playing a cold fish here, and does a credible job getting inside Dennis's aura of shifty desperation" and "DeHaan gives us very much his own Dean, and he's immediately rather fascinating." Guy Lodge of Variety said that "peculiarly moving, even subtly queer friendship between the two men that distinguishes Life from standard inside-Hollywood fare, while gorgeous production values and ace star turns make it a thoroughly marketable arthouse prospect" and added that "DeHaan and Pattinson enact this anti-romance beautifully, each man quizzically eyeing the other for leads and clues, while coyly retreating from scrutiny. Pattinson, adding to his post-"Twilight" gallery of sharp-cut screw-ups, brings intriguing layers of childish dysfunction to a character who is only ostensibly the straight man in the partnership. DeHaan, meanwhile, plays Dean as the more openly flirtatious of the two, a flashier generational companion to his louchely inspired Lucien Carr in 2013's Kill Your Darlings". Stephen Schaefer of the Boston Herald in his review said that, "Life is fairly low-key, yet it breathes with an honesty and an astuteness" and that "Pattinson is perfectly cast as Stock, a man adrift with an ex-wife from a teenage marriage and guilt filled about the young son he never sees. DeHaan doesn't exactly resemble Dean so much as inhabit his Fifties hipster lingo, attitude and speech patterns." Little White Lies gave the film a positive review by saying that "As Life proceeds the pace picks up and by the third act, it is a compelling dramatisation of an artistically fascinating alliance." About the performances, it added that "DeHaan ratchets up Dean's rhythmic speech and sounds permanently like a performance poet reading Allan Ginsberg [sic]. He is curt and minimal essaying a very controlled, clock-watching professional" and "Pattinson's performance is as crisp as the white shirt and black suits his character always wears. This is a camouflage for his own problems that slowly unfurl, adding colour and improving the film."

While David Rooney of The Hollywood Reporter criticized the film, saying that "Life doesn't deliver on its considerable promise" but ultimately praised Pattinson, saying that "While Pattinson has endured a lot of gratuitous bashing post-Twilight, he gives arguably the most fully rounded performance here, even if the character is inconsistently drawn." Peter Bradshaw of The Guardian gave the film two stars out of five and notes that, "There are some pleasing touches, but this film is a frustrating experience."

== See also ==
- The James Dean Story
- James Dean - 2001 biographical television film
- Beyond Iconic: Photographer Dennis Stock - 2011 biographical documentary film
