= Candy: A Novel of Love and Addiction =

Book by Luke Davies

- First edition
- Author: Luke Davies
- Language: English
- Genre: Romance, drama
- Publisher: Allen & Unwin
- Publication date: 1997
- Publication place: Australia
- Media type: Print (paperback)
- Pages: 286 pp (paperback edition)
- ISBN: 9781864483390 (Australian first paperback edition)
- OCLC: 37947403
- Dewey Decimal: 823 21
- LC Class: PR9619.3.D29 C36 1998

Candy: A Novel of Love and Addiction (1997) is a novel by Luke Davies. The novel follows an unnamed narrator and his relationship with Candy, his girlfriend and later wife, and their addiction to heroin. The novel was loosely based on Luke Davies' own troubles with addiction and after the release of a movie adaptation of the novel Australian painter Megan Bannister, Davies' ex-wife, identified herself as the inspiration for Candy.

In 2006 the novel was adapted into a movie directed by Neil Armfield from a script by Davies starring Heath Ledger as the narrator and Abbie Cornish as Candy.

== Summary ==
An unnamed narrator who is addicted to heroin introduces his beloved blonde girlfriend, Candy, to the drug. Early in their relationship the couple try to detox separately, with the narrator staying in Sydney while Candy returns home to Melbourne to stay clean. While Candy succeeds the narrator fails to stay clean and when she returns home she quickly relapses.

After pawning their possessions for drugs fails to procure them the necessary amount of money to secure a hit of heroin, a pawnbroker offers Candy cash for sex, which she accepts. Learning that someone from their social circle works at a brothel, Candy takes up the work herself and quickly finds that she can earn up to a thousand dollars a day working as a prostitute and escort. The narrator runs small scams to try to supplement their income.

With money for heroin temporarily secured, the couple decide to get married. Shortly after Candy becomes pregnant and though the two plan to quit heroin "tomorrow", by the time Candy is 5 months pregnant, they are still keeping up their habit. Candy has a miscarriage and the baby is stillborn.

Candy goes from working in high end brothels and for wealthy clients to prostituting herself on the street. As their ability to procure heroin becomes more erratic, Candy tells the narrator she wants to quit prostitution. The narrator decides to provide for them by selling drugs and is able to purchase the recipe for making heroin off a professor friend of theirs, Casper.

Though the narrator and Candy are able to successfully make heroin they are less successful at selling and end up using most of their product. Ironically now that they have a near endless supply of their drug of choice the narrator cannot enjoy it due to his collapsed veins.

The narrator and Candy eventually give up their drug business and go on methadone, successfully rehabilitating themselves. With cash from Candy's parents they are able to buy a rundown farm in the countryside, however as she comes down off heroin Candy becomes bitter about both her relationship with the narrator and her relationship with her parents.

After she has an affair with a neighbor who deals pot, things fall apart. The narrator leaves and stays with an old friend whom he angers, and gets kicked out after two days. The narrator then begins his own affair but is soon called by Candy's father. Candy has had a full nervous breakdown and is hospitalised. The narrator makes his way home to find a very changed and very delusional Candy. After she is released they try one more time, but the narrator breaks the rules after running into Casper. Candy leaves the narrator, and shortly afterward Casper is caught making heroin. His employer sends him to rehab but Casper leaves, knowing that action marks the end of his career. Casper then gets antidepressants and alcohol, goes to his lab, cooks one last batch, and commits suicide. The narrator goes into rehab and sobers up. He sees Candy the first chance he is allowed to, and she tells him she knows they have to end. They have to stay apart to be clean.

== Background ==
Davies has admitted the novel is based on his experiences as a heroin addict in the 1980s, the "worst years" being 1984 to 1990. Sydney and Melbourne were the epicentres of a "severe" heroin problem during this period. Davies has also emphasised that the novel is "fiction rather than memoir".

Following the release of the film based on the book, also called Candy (2006), Melbourne painter Megan Bannister was identified as the woman who is portrayed as Candy in the novel. She and Davies were married for six years during the 1980s and confirms that key events in the film (and novel) really did happen except that "living it was 50,000 times worse".

Davies put the story together over the course of the early 1990s, stating in interviews that "chapters were written separately and out of sequence". The first edition was published on 16 June 1998.

== Themes ==
Candy explores the lives of young lovers suffering from heroin addiction. Apart from the love story and the idea of escapism, Candy shows how the two characters find themselves rationalizing and deteriorating both physically and personally due to their drug addiction.

Davies says: "... the character Candy is a two-dimensional approximation of the narrator's desires, obsessions and his inability to see the truth at any deep level". In the second part of the book, as the narrator and Candy meet tragedy through the loss of their unborn child and Candy's mental breakdown, the story explores the themes of guilt, loss, and self-awareness.

== Awards and nominations ==
- Shortlisted, Christina Stead Prize for fiction, New South Wales Premier's Literary Awards 1999
- Joint Winner, Best Young Australian Novelist, The Sydney Morning Herald 1998
- Shortlisted, Addison Wesley Longman Award for the Best Cover/Jacket D

== Film adaptation ==
A film adaptation, also called Candy (2006), stars Heath Ledger as Dan, Abbie Cornish as Candy, Geoffrey Rush as Casper, Noni Hazlehurst as Mrs. Wyatt, and Tony Martin as Mr. Wyatt. It was directed by Neil Armfield and produced by Emile Sherman and Margaret Fink.

== Release details ==
- 1997, Allen & Unwin, Sydney ISBN 9781864483390. Issued in paperback. pp. [viii] 286 [6]
- 1998, USE, Ballantine Books ISBN 0-345-42387-9, Pub date 16 June 1998, Softcover
- 1998, Vintage Books, Random House, UK

The book was also published in France (Editions Heloise d'Ormesson), Germany (Droemer-Knaur), Greece, Israel, and Spain (Editions Planeta).

The subtitle, "A Novel of Love and Addiction", was only used in the American edition; elsewhere the book is only called Candy. There is also an essential difference between the American edition and all the others: in the US edition, the opening chapter "Example of Good Times" runs for only a page, then the chapter repeats and continues as the final chapter in the book. Davies has stated publicly he regrets agreeing to this change, and the Australian edition should be taken as the definitive one.

== Sources ==
- Candy, Allen & Unwin
