= Frank Ledger =

Western Australian businessman (1899–1993)

Sir Joseph Francis Ledger (29 October 1899 – 8 April 1993), widely known as Frank Ledger, was a Western Australian businessman and philanthropist. Knighted in 1963, he supported agricultural development, advocated for sports, and his legacy includes the Sir Frank Ledger Charitable Trust.

== Early life ==
Ledger was born on 29 October 1899, in East Perth, Western Australia. He was the third of nine children born to Edson Ledger and Annie Francis née Sumner. At age fourteen, he started an apprenticeship with his father's and uncle's engineering firm J. and E. Ledger, during which he gained diverse skills in general engineering, blacksmithing, and founding.

Ledger enlisted in the Australian Imperial Force on 4 May 1918, during World War I. The war concluded while he was still training in Victoria, and Ledger was discharged on 24 December. He worked in various engineering fields, including motor vehicles, whilst also attending night classes at Perth Technical School. In 1923, he married Gladys Muriel Lyons (1905–1981).

== Family business ==
After the death of his father in 1924, Ledger took on more responsibilities in the family business. The firm was officially incorporated as a company in September, marking the beginning of Ledger's long tenure at the helm. In response to the economic challenges of the Great Depression, Ledger expanded the business activities to include brickmaking, pottery, and manufacturing print machinery. He also expanded the business' premises, acquired additional land, and developed the sales side of the business. Ledger's leadership continued until 1965 when the company was sold to Mitchell Cotts, a British firm.

== Industrial development ==
During his career, Ledger played a pivotal role in the industrial landscape of Western Australia. Notably, he was the instigator and inaugural president of the Institute of Foundrymen in 1943, aimed at raising standards and promoting metallurgical advancements. His involvement extended to various associations, including the Metropolitan Ironmaster's Association, the West Australian Chamber of Manufactures, and the Western Australian Employers Federation. Ledger's commitment to industrial development for economic growth led him to support future premier Charles Court's entry into politics. His dedication to fostering economic growth extended beyond industry to agricultural development, notably the Ord River Scheme and initiatives near Esperance. Ledger was knighted during the 1963 royal visit in recognition for his contributions to industry.

== Sports ==
Apart from his professional endeavours, Ledger maintained a passion for sports including football, yachting, and horse racing. He was vice-president of the East Perth Football Club from 1936 to 1941, was vice-president and later president of the Western Australian Trotting Association in the 1960s and 1970s and was the initial chairman of the Australian Harness Racing Council. Ledger oversaw the redevelopment of Gloucester Park, including the building of grandstands and modernisation of public amenities.

== Later life and legacy ==
In his final years, Sir Frank Ledger was unknowingly placed in financial jeopardy by his grandson Kim Ledger. The management of Sir Frank's estate became the subject of controversy when Kim Ledger claiming that he was rebuilding the family company on his 90yo Grandfather's behalf, had his grandfather sign documents guaranteeing loans totalling millions of dollars in favour of Kim Ledger. The company was in receivership and Sir Frank died on 8 April 1993, aged 92–93 (for he has outlived both his son who died aged 65 two years prior in 1991 and also his wife); unaware he was insolvent. After his death, his home was sold at a mortgagee auction with the proceeds going to the bank that lent Kim Ledger the money.

Ledger's legacy endures through the Sir Frank Ledger Charitable Trust, established in 1971 to providing financial support for young people, and a scholarship at the University of Western Australia Business School bears his name. Ledger was recognised as one of the most influential Western Australian businesspeople in The West Australian's 2013 list of the 100 most influential.

Ledger's great-grandson was actor Heath Ledger.
