= Luke Davies =

Australian writer

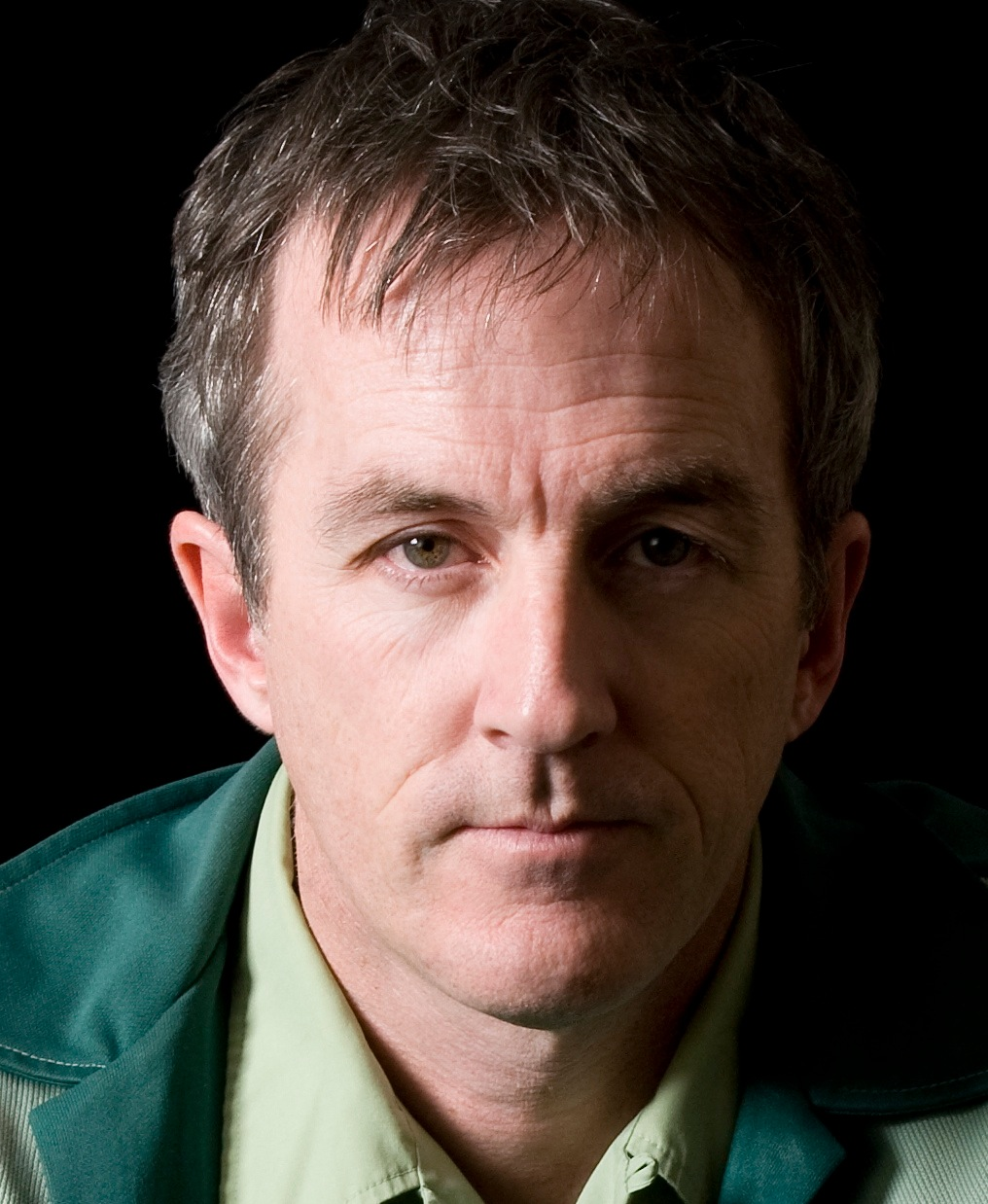
- Davies in 2013
- Education: University of Sydney (BA)

Luke Davies is an Australian writer of poetry, novels, and screenplays. His best known works are Candy: A Novel of Love and Addiction (which was adapted for the screen in 2006) and the screenplay for the film Lion (2016), which earned him a nomination for the Academy Award for Best Adapted Screenplay. Davies also co-wrote the screenplay for the 2020 film News of the World and the 2026 film Tenzing.

== Early life and education ==
Luke Davies grew up in the Sydney suburb of West Pymble. He studied arts at the University of Sydney.

== Career ==
=== Fiction and poetry ===
Davies' first poetry collection, Four Plots for Magnets, was published in 1982 by S. K. Kelen at Glandular Press. Long out of print, it was republished (with additional poetry and prose) by Pitt Street Poetry in 2013.

Davies' other works include the novels Isabelle the Navigator and God of Speed, and several volumes of poetry – Four Plots for Magnets, Absolute Event Horizon, Running With Light, Totem and Interferon Psalms – as well as the chatbooks The Entire History of Architecture [...] and other love poems (Vagabond Press, 2001) and The Feral Aphorisms (Vagabond Press, 2011).

His children's book, Magpie, was published by ABC Books in 2010.

=== Non-fiction ===
Davies is also a film critic for The Monthly, and occasional book reviewer and essayist for other magazines and newspapers. In 2010, Davies won the John Curtin Prize for Journalism, at the Victorian Premier's Literary Awards, for his 2008 essay The Penalty Is Death, about the lives inside prison of Andrew Chan and Myuran Sukumaran, two drug runners on Bali's death row. (They were executed by firing squad, to great public controversy, in 2015.)

=== Film ===
Davies co-wrote the screenplay for the 2006 film Candy with director Neil Armfield, based on his 1997 novel Candy. The film stars Heath Ledger and Abbie Cornish as struggling heroin addicts.

He wrote the screenplays for Air (a 2009 short film which he also directed), Life, Lion, and the 2018 Felix van Groeningen drama Beautiful Boy. He wrote the screenplay for the 2020 film News of the World, adapted from Paulette Jiles' novel, starring Tom Hanks .

Davies wrote the screenplay for the 2026 film Tenzing, an international co-production directed by Australian filmmaker Jennifer Peedom.

== Personal life ==
Davies overcame heroin addiction in 1990.

In May 2017, the ABC Television program Australian Story profiled Davies' life in a two-part episode.

== Awards and nominations ==
=== Literary ===
- 1995: Turnbull Fox Phillips Poetry Prize Shortlisted for Absolute Event Horizon
- 1998: Sydney Morning Herald Young Writer of the Year
- 2000: Queensland Premier's Literary Awards, Judith Wright Poetry Prize for Running With Light
- 2004: The Age Poetry Book of the Year) for Totem
- 2004: Overall Age Book of the Year for Totem
- 2004: Grace Leven Prize for Poetry for Totem
- 2004: Philip Hodgins Memorial Medal at the Mildura Writer's Festival
- 2006: South Australian Premier's Awards, John Bray Poetry Award for Totem
- 2010: John Curtin Prize for Journalism at the Victorian Premier's Literary Awards for the essay The Penalty Is Death
- 2011: Southern California Journalism Awards for the essay The Cisco Kid (Finalist)
- 2012: Prime Minister's Literary Awards Poetry Winner for Interferon Psalms

=== Screen ===
==== Candy ====
- 2006: Co-winner, AWGIE Award for Feature Film-Adaptation, shared with Neil Armfield
- 2006: Co-winner, Australian Film Institute Award for Best Screenplay-Adapted, shared with Neil Armfield

==== Lion ====
- 2016: Nominated, Critics' Choice Movie Award for Best Adapted Screenplay
- 2016: Winner, Austin Film Festival Audience Award for Marquee Feature,
- 2016: Nominated,, WAFCA Award for Best Adapted Screenplay
- 2016: Nominated,, SLFCA Award for Best Adapted Screenplay
- 2016: Nominated,, SDFCS Award for Best Adapted Screenplay
- 2016: Nominated,, PFCS Award for Best Screenplay Adapted from Other Material
- 2016: Nominated,, Sierra Award for Best Screenplay, Adapted
- 2016: AFCA Award for Best Adapted Screenplay
- 2016: Winner, Capri Adapted Screenplay Award
- 2016: Nominated,, Alliance of Women Film Journalists EDA Award for Best Adapted Screenplay
- 2016: Winner, Hamilton Behind the Camera Awards for Breakthrough Screenwriter
- 2017: Nominated, Satellite Award for Best Adapted Screenplay
- 2017: Nominated,, AACTA International Award for Best Screenplay
- 2017: Nominated, USC Scripter Award for Best Screenplay
- 2017: Winner, Capri International Film Festival Award for Best Adapted Screenplay
- 2017: Winner, BAFTA for Best Adapted Screenplay
- 2017: Nominated,, Academy Award for Best Adapted Screenplay
- 2017: Nominated,, Online Film & Television Association Film Award for Best Writing, Screenplay Based on Material from Another Medium
- 2017: Winner, AACTA Award for Best Adapted Screenplay
- 2017: Nominated,, EDA Awards for Best Writing, Adapted Screenplay
- 2018: Nominated, Film Critics Circle of Australia Awards for Best Screenplay
- 2018: Winner, Asia-Pacific Film Festival Awards for Best Screenplay

==== News of the World ====
- 2021: Hawaii Film Critics Society Awards for Best Adapted Screenplay for News of the World, shared with Paul Greengrass (Nominated)
- 2021: National Board Of Review Award for Best Adapted Screenplay for News of the World shared with Paul Greengrass (Won)
- 2021: Satellite Awards for Best Screenplay, Adapted for News of the World shared with Paul Greengrass (Nominated)
- 2021: Critics Choice Awards for Best Adapted Screenplay for News of the World shared with Paul Greengrass (Nominated)
- 2021: AARP Movies for Grownups Awards for Best Screenwriter for News of the World shared with Paul Greengrass (Nominated)
- 2021: Writers Guild of America Awards for Adapted Screenplay for News of the World shared with Paul Greengrass (Nominated)
