= Dennis Stock =

American journalist and professional photographer

- The Photojournalist - Portrait of Dennis Stock by Andreas Feininger for Life magazine, 1951
- Born: July 24, 1928; The Bronx, New York City
- Died: January 11, 2010 (aged 81); Sarasota, Florida
- Occupations: Photographer, photojournalist

Dennis Stock (July 24, 1928 – January 11, 2010) was an American journalist and professional photographer.

== Life and career ==
Stock was born in The Bronx in New York City, to Fannie and Fred Stock. His father was Swiss and his mother was English.

Stock served in the United States Navy from 1947 to 1951. Following his discharge, he apprenticed under photographer Gjon Mili. In 1951, he won a first prize in a Life magazine competition for young photographers. That same year, he became an associate member of the photography agency Magnum. He became a full partner-member in 1954.

Stock met the actor James Dean in 1955, a few months before the latter's sudden death. He undertook a series of photos of the actor in Hollywood, Dean's hometown in Indiana, and in New York City. One of his portraits of Dean in New York's Times Square became an iconic image of the young star. The black and white picture shows the actor with a pulled up collar on a long coat and a cigarette in his mouth on a rain-soaked, grey day. It later appeared in numerous galleries and on postcards and posters and became one of the most reproduced photographs of the post-war period.

From 1957 until the early 1960s, Stock aimed his lens at jazz musicians, photographing such people as Louis Armstrong, Billie Holiday, Sidney Bechet, Gene Krupa and Duke Ellington or Miles Davis (see for example, Milestones Cover Photo). With this series of photographs he published the book Jazz Street. In 1962, he received the first prize at the International Photo Competition in Poland. In 1968, Stock left Magnum to start his own film company, Visual Objectives Inc., and made several documentaries, but he returned to the agency a year later, as vice president for new media and film. In the mid-1970s, he traveled to Japan and the Far East, and also produced numerous features series, such as photographs of contrasting regions, like Hawaii and Alaska. In the 1970s and 1980s he focused on color photography of nature and landscape, and returned to his urban roots in the 1990s focusing on architecture and modernism.

In 2006, Stock married writer Susan Richards. They lived in Woodstock, New York, with their four dogs. He had previously been married three other times, and had three children.

== Death ==
Dennis Stock died of colon and liver cancer in Sarasota, Florida on 11 January 2010.

== Film portrayals ==
In 2011, a documentary film Beyond Iconic: Photographer Dennis Stock, narrated by Stock himself was released. It was completed before his death.

Robert Pattinson portrayed him in the biographical drama film Life (2015), about Stock's friendship with James Dean.

== Awards ==
- 1991, Advertising Photographers of America, USA
- 1962, 1st Prize, International Photography Competition, Poland.
- 1951, 1st Prize, Life Young Photographers Contest, USA

== Publications ==
- Alaska, USA: Harry N. Abrams, 1978
- The Alternative: Communal Life in New America, UK: Collier-Macmillan, 1970
- America Seen, France: Contrejour, 1980, ISBN 978-2-85949-027-0
- Brother Sun, USA: Sierra Club Books, 1974
- California: the Golden Coast, with Philip L. Fradkin, USA: Viking Press/Studio Book, 1974, ISBN 978-0-670-19969-3
- California Trip, USA: Grossman Publishers, 1970, ISBN 978-0-670-19976-1
- California Trip, Brooklyn, NY: Anthology Editions, 2019, ISBN 978-1-944860-26-4
- The Circle of Seasons, with Josephine W. Johnson, USA: Viking Press, 1974, ISBN 978-0-436-49650-9
- Edge of Life: World of the Estuary, USA: Sierra Club Books, 1972
- Flower Show, USA: Rizzoli, 1986; Impressions, fleurs, France: Mengès, 1986
- A Haiku Journey, Japan/USA: Kodansha International, 1974
- The Happy Year, USA: Channel Press, Inc., 1963
- Hawaii New York: Harry N. Abrams, 1988, ISBN 978-0-8109-1076-8; 1991, ISBN 978-0-7924-4712-2
- I Grandi Fotografi : Dennis Stock, Italy: Gruppo Editoriale Fabbri, 1982
- James Dean: Fifty Years Ago New York: Harry N. Abrams, 2005, ISBN 0-8109-5903-8; France: La Martinière, 2005.
- James Dean Revisited, USA: Viking Press/Penguin Books, 1978, ISBN 978-0-14-004939-8; USA: Shirmer & Mosel/Chronicle Books, 1987, ISBN 978-0-87701-471-3
- Jazz Street, USA: Doubleday, 1960
- Jazz Welt, Germany: Verlag Gerd Hatje, 1959
- Living Our Future : Francis of Assisi, USA: Franciscan Herald, 1972
- Made in the U.S.A., Germany/USA: Cantz, 1995, ISBN 978-3-89322-639-9
- National Parks Centennial Portfolio, USA: Sierra Club Books, 1972, ISBN 978-0-87156-058-2
- New England Memories, USA: Bulfinch Press, 1989, ISBN 978-0-8212-1749-8
- Plaisir du Jazz, France: La Guilde du Livre, 1959
- Portrait of a Young Man, James Dean, USA: Kadokawa Shoten, 1956
- Provence Memories, USA: New York Graphic Society, ISBN 0-8212-1715-1; Bullfinch Press, 1989, ISBN 978-0-8212-1715-3; Provence, France: Le Chêne, 1988
- Saint Francis of Assisi, with Lawrence Cunningham, USA: Harper & Row, 1981, ISBN 978-0-584-97080-7; Franziskus: Der Mann aus Assisi, Switzerland: Reich Verlag, 1981
- This Land of Europe, Japan/USA: Kodansha International, 1976, ISBN 978-0-87011-276-8
- Voyage Poétique à Travers le Japon d'Autrefois, Switzerland: Office du Livre, 1976
