= Crawford (film) =

- Directed by: David Modigliani
- Produced by: David Modigliani
- Edited by: Matt Naylor
- Release date: March 8, 2008 (South by Southwest Film Festival)
- Running time: 75 minutes
- Country: United States
- Language: English

Crawford is a 2008 documentary film about Crawford, Texas, and the impact of President George W. Bush having relocated to the town shortly after announcing his nomination for the 2000 presidential election. The film spans nearly the entirety of Bush's presidency, from 1999 to mid-2008. Crawford was directed by David Modigliani and distributed by B-Side Entertainment.

On October 7, 2008, the complete film was made available for free on the video website Hulu and was billed as the site's "first movie premiere."

== Reviews ==
On Rotten Tomatoes the film has an approval rating of 100% based on reviews from 5 critics.

It won the 2008 San Antonio Film Festival Auteur Award. It also won the Austin Award at the Austin Film Critics Association Awards 2008.
