= African-American Film Critics Association Awards 2008 =

Annual US film awards ceremony

6th African-American Film Critics Association Awards
- Date: December 19, 2008

Highlights
- Best Picture: The Dark Knight

The African-American Film Critics Association Awards 2008, honoring the best in filmmaking of 2008, were given on December 19, 2008.

== Top 10 Films ==
1. The Dark Knight
2. Slumdog Millionaire
3. The Curious Case of Benjamin Button
4. The Secret Life of Bees
5. Cadillac Records
6. Miracle at St. Anna
7. Milk
8. Seven Pounds
9. Doubt
10. Iron Man

== Winners ==
- Best Actor:
  - Frank Langella – Frost/Nixon
- Best Actress:
  - Angelina Jolie – Changeling
- Best Director:
  - Danny Boyle – Slumdog Millionaire
- Best Picture:
  - The Dark Knight
- Best Supporting Actor:
  - Heath Ledger – The Dark Knight posthumously
- Best Supporting Actress:
  - Viola Davis – Doubt
