= Totem (poetry collection) =

2004 poetry collection by Luke Davies

Totem : Totem Poem Plus 40 Love Poems
- Author: Luke Davies
- Language: English
- Genre: Poetry collection
- Publisher: Allen and Unwin
- Publication date: 2004
- Publication place: Australia
- Media type: Print
- Pages: 85 pp.
- Awards: 2004 The Age Book of the Year Award — Book of the Year
- ISBN: 1741143489

Totem : Totem Poem Plus 40 Love Poems is a collection of poems by Australian writer Luke Davies, published by Allen and Unwin in 2004.

The collection contains 41 poems which were published in a variety of original publications, with some being published here for the first time.

== Contents ==
- "Totem Poem"
- "(Naked)"
- "(Bells)"
- "(Transparent)"
- "(Mortal)"
- "(Sweep)"
- "(Suck)"
- "(Shudder)"
- "(Supple)"
- "(Horizon)"
- "(Hunger)"
- "(Blade)"
- "(Clasp)"
- "(Roar)"
- "(Creek)"
- "(Slide)"
- "(Breathe)"
- "(Beyond)"
- "(Bloom)"
- "(Brim)"
- "(Blink)"
- "(Bed)"
- "(Glow)"
- "(Fluorescent)"
- "(Arc)"
- "(Nine Hours)"
- "(Bearing)"
- "(Borne)"
- "(Sketch)"
- "(Home)"
- "(Cut)"
- "(Hell)"
- "(Arrow)"
- "(Adam)"
- "(Loop)"
- "(Girl)"
- "(Lion)"
- "(Warren)"
- "(Teeter)"
- "(Plateau)"
- "(Theology)"

== Critical reception ==
Writing in The Age reviewer Cameron Woodhead noted: "As well as being a novelist of distinction, Luke Davies is one of the handful of Australian versifiers whose poetic sensibility is keen and grand enough to command the attention, if not of the gods, then of men and booksellers alike. The publication of his fourth book of poems, Totem, confirms his place as one of our finest contemporary poets...The centrepiece of Davies's new collection, "Totem Poem", is an extraordinary achievement. It is one of the rarest things in our fallen world - a 40-page love poem that matches, for strength of vision, verbal mastery and emotive force, the love poetry of previous centuries, without succumbing to anachronism or embarrassing cliche...Davies is unquestionably our greatest love poet ever; anyone who cares about verse cannot afford to ignore him."

== Awards ==
- 2004 The Age Book of the Year Award
- 2004 Grace Leven Prize for Poetry
- 2006 Adelaide Festival Awards for Literature

== See also ==
- 2004 in Australian literature
