= Interferon Psalms =

2011 poetry collection by Luke Davies

- Author: Luke Davies
- Language: English
- Genre: Poetry collection
- Publisher: Allen and Unwin
- Publication date: 1977
- Publication place: Australia
- Media type: Print
- Pages: 120 pp.
- Awards: 2012 Prime Minister's Literary Award for Poetry, winner
- ISBN: 9781742370347

Interferon Psalms : 33 Psalms on the 99 Names of God is a collection of poems by Australian poet Luke Davies, published by Allen and Unwin in Australia in 2011.

The collection won the 2012 Prime Minister's Literary Award for Poetry.

== Background ==
In an interview with The Daily Telegraph in 2004 Davies noted that he was working on this collection of prose poems "which reflects his experiences with treatment for a liver condition that has delayed his new novel."

== Contents ==
The contents of this volume are a series of 33 "Psalms" grouped under 5 sections as follows:

- Group I: 1 to 5
- Group II: 6 to 15
- Group III: 16 to 27
- Group IV: 28 to 31
- Group V: 32 to 33

== Critical reception ==
In a review of the collection for The Weekend Australian critic Peter Craven noted that it "is not in any literal sense a suite of interrelated poems about medical procedures, and still less about getting free, but rather a book about the deep and annihilating darkness of mortality and the light that can shine in its depths." He concluded that the volume "is one of the most ambitious performances in modern Australian poetry".

David McCooey, in The Age newspaper found "The book's arc is one of bewilderment and sadness giving way, through memory and poetry, to a kind of praise."

== Notes ==
Epigraphs: "This life of yours is not a picture of the world. It is the world itself, and it is composed not of bone or dream or time but of worship." — Cormac McCarthy, Cities of the Plain
"From death before we are ready to die, good Lord deliver us." — Sir Francis Chichester, The Lonely Sea and the Sky

== See also ==
- 2011 in Australian literature
