= Beyond Iconic: Photographer Dennis Stock =

- Film poster
- Directed by: Hanna Sawka Hamaguchi
- Written by: Hanna Sawka Hamaguchi
- Produced by: Hanna Sawka Hamaguchi
- Cinematography: Mateusz Broughton
- Edited by: Hanna Sawka Hamaguchi
- Music by: John Menegon; Teri Roiger
- Production company: Peppercat Productions
- Release date: October 15, 2011 (HSDFF)
- Running time: 75 minutes
- Country: United States
- Language: English

Beyond Iconic: Photographer Dennis Stock is a 2011 American biographical documentary film, written, produced and directed by Hanna Sawka Hamaguchi. The film chronicles the personal and professional life of photographer Dennis Stock. It is narrated by Stock himself and was completed before his death in 2010. The film illuminated different aspects of Stock's life including his classroom at the Omega Institute, where he taught a master class on photography before his death.

The film premiered at 20th Hot Springs Documentary Film Festival on October 15, 2011. Later the film screened at number of festivals including 35th São Paulo International Film Festival, 2014 DOC NYC Film Festival, 34th Denver Film Festival and 2014 Visions du Réel.

== Synopsis ==
The film explores the work and life of one of the late 20th century's most influential photographers in his own words and through hundreds of his famous photographs.

== Reception ==
The film received mostly positive reviews from critics. Lauren Wissot in her review for Filmmaker: The Magazine of Independent Film praised the director by saying that "Hamaguchi smartly cuts from Stock’s master class to direct interviews with the no-nonsense product of The Bronx (“The more you rationalize bad pictures the further you get from taking good pictures,” he advises his students), juxtaposed with Stock narrating the stories behind many of his legendary stills, including the shot of a pre-iconic James Dean navigating Times Square in the rain. Stock comes off as a brilliant teacher – both brutally honest and sensitive, and able to clearly articulate what works in a photo, what doesn’t, and why."

Colorado Photographic Arts Center in their review praised Hamaguchi: "Her film balances Stock’s quiet, contemplative life with his wife and pets against his worldly, vibrant, and yet somehow equally intimate portraits of actors, musicians, and a generation of iconoclasts struggling to find meaning in an increasingly pop culture–driven America."

Ann Hutton of Almanac gave the film a positive review by saying that "Stock’s artistic philosophy, his commitment to integrity of purpose and his ability to see the story in a picture are expertly depicted in this unnarrated treatment." She further added that "Stock’s work is much more than just a bio in photographs, as Sawka, who grew up in High Falls and has four award-winning short films to her credit, gets inside the artist, goes beyond the “iconic” and finds the man behind the beautiful and evocative pictures."

Mark Antonation, in his review for the Starz Denver Film Festival said that "The director balances Stock’s quiet, contemplative life with his wife and pets against his worldly, vibrant, and yet somehow equally intimate portraits of actors, musicians, and a generation of iconoclasts struggling to find meaning in an increasingly pop culture–driven America. While his pictures need no explanation, Hamaguchi allows Stock’s belief in his work to echo with the same eloquence, clarity, and confidence they emanate."
