= Antidepressants and suicide risk =

The relationship between antidepressant use and suicide risk is a subject of medical research and has faced varying levels of debate. This problem was thought to be serious enough to warrant intervention by the U.S. Food and Drug Administration to label greater likelihood of suicide "in children and adolescents" as a risk of using antidepressants in 2006.

According to the FDA, the heightened risk of suicidality occurs within the first one to two months of treatment. The National Institute for Health and Care Excellence (NICE) places the excess risk in the "early stages of treatment".

A meta-analysis suggests that the relationship between antidepressant use and suicidal behavior or thoughts is age-dependent. Compared with placebo, the use of antidepressants is associated with an increase in suicidal behavior or thoughts among those 25 years old or younger (OR=1.62). A review of RCTs and epidemiological studies by Healy and Whitaker found an increase in suicidal acts by a factor of 2.4. There is no effect or possibly a mild protective effect among those aged 25 to 64 (OR=0.79).

Antidepressant treatment has a protective effect against suicidality among those aged 65 and over (OR=0.37).

Conclusions about increased suicidality have faced considerable scrutiny and disagreement: a multinational European study indicated that antidepressants decrease risk of suicide at the population level, and other reviews of antidepressant use claim that there is not enough data to indicate antidepressant use increases risk of suicide.

Some studies have shown that the use of certain antidepressants correlate with an increased risk of suicide in some patients relative to other antidepressants.

== By type of population ==
=== Youth ===
Meta analyses of short duration randomized clinical trials have found that SSRI use is related to a higher risk of suicidal behavior in children and adolescents. For instance, a 2004 U.S. Food and Drug Administration (FDA) analysis of clinical trials on children with major depressive disorder found statistically significant increases of the risks of "possible suicidal ideation and suicidal behavior" by about 80%, and of agitation and hostility by about 130%. According to the FDA, the heightened risk of suicidality is within the first one to two months of treatment. The National Institute for Health and Care Excellence (NICE) places the excess risk in the "early stages of treatment". The European Psychiatric Association places the excess risk in the first two weeks of treatment and, based on a combination of epidemiological, prospective cohort, medical claims, and randomized clinical trial data, concludes that a protective effect dominates after this early period.

A 2014 Cochrane review found that at six to nine months, suicidal ideation remained higher in children treated with antidepressants compared to those treated with psychological therapy.

In a 2006 study, sertraline, tricyclic agents and venlafaxine were found to increase the risk of attempted suicide in severely depressed adolescents on Medicaid.

A 2007 comparison of aggression and hostility occurring during treatment with fluoxetine to placebo in children and adolescents found that no significant difference between the fluoxetine group and a placebo group. There is also evidence that higher rates of SSRI prescriptions are associated with lower rates of suicide in children, though since the evidence is correlational, the true nature of the relationship is unclear.

A 2016 review of selective serotonin reuptake inhibitors (SSRIs) and serotonin-norepinephrine reuptake inhibitors (SNRIs) which looked at four outcomes—death, suicidality, aggressive behaviour, and agitation—found that while the data was insufficient to draw strong conclusions, adults taking these drugs did not appear to be at increased risk for any of the four outcomes, but that for people under the age of 18, the risks of suicidality and for aggression doubled. The authors expressed frustration with incomplete reporting and lack of access to data, and with some aspects of the clinical trial designs, which may have resulted in significant under-reporting of harms.

A 2021 Swedish study, using a within-individual design, also found that young people (as well as adults) who have both attempted suicide and been prescribed SSRIs most commonly make the attempt before, rather than after, starting their SSRI prescription.

=== Adults ===
A 2009 analysis shows that the increased risk for suicidality and suicidal behaviour among adults under 25 approaches that seen in children and adolescents.

In 2016 a review criticized the effects of the FDA "black box" suicide warning inclusion in the prescription. The authors discussed the suicide rates might increase also as a consequence of the warning. A 2019 review makes a similar claim, noting that instead of increasing the use of psychotherapy (as the FDA had hoped), the warning has increased the use of benzodiazepines.

In 2019 Hengartner and Plöderl published the research, which was based on the integrated safety summaries provided by the FDA for all phase II and III trials conducted by the pharmaceutical industry for adults with major depression, treated with sertraline, paroxetine, venlafaxine, nefazodone, mirtazapine, venlafaxine ER, citalopram, escitalopram, duloxetine, desvenlafaxine, trazodone ER, vilazodone, levomilnacipram, and vortioxetine versus placebo. They found 37 deaths by suicide in the antidepressant group (31,781 patients), and only 4 deaths by suicide in the placebo group (10,080 patients). Apart from this the rates of suicide attempts were 250% higher in the people taking antidepressants than in those who were given the placebo: 206 suicide attempts in people taking antidepressants, versus 28 suicide attempts in people taking placebo.

A 2021 study on Swedish youth and adults between 2006 and 2013 (n = 538,577) finds that the highest frequency of suicides occurs at 30 days before, rather than after, the beginning of SSRI prescription. This indicates that SSRIs do not increase the risk of suicide and may reduce the risk. This result holds for all age groups examined.

=== On dose change ===
A 2009 study found increased risk of suicide after initiation, titration, and discontinuation of medication. A study of 159,810 users of either amitriptyline, fluoxetine, paroxetine or dothiepin found that the risk of suicidal behavior is increased in the first month after starting antidepressants, especially during the first 1 to 9 days.

== By type of drug ==
=== Removed warnings ===
==== Varenicline and bupropion ====
In 2009, the FDA issued a health advisory warning that the prescription of varenicline and bupropion for smoking cessation has been associated with reports of unusual behavior changes, agitation, and hostility. Some people, according to the advisory, have become depressed or have had their depression worsen, have had thoughts about suicide or dying, or have attempted suicide. This advisory was based on a review of anti-smoking products that identified 75 reports of "suicidal adverse events" for bupropion over ten years. Based on the results of follow-up trials this warning was removed in 2016.

== Mechanism ==
It remains controversial whether increased risk of suicide is due to the medication (a paradoxical effect) or part of the depression itself (i.e. the antidepressant enables those who are severely depressed—who ordinarily would be paralyzed by their depression—to become more alert and act out suicidal urges before being fully recovered from their depressive episode).

Another possible mechanism for increased suicide risk, involving the effects of medication, is as follows. In children and adolescents, frequent new experiences, extensive learning and rapid brain development could lead to neurotransmitter depletion in presynaptic terminals in the brain, both cortical and subcortical. This would be consistent with their longer sleep requirements, to enable learning to be consolidated and neurotransmitter stores replenished. (Presynaptic depletion might also arise in adults in some circumstances, for example from experiencing prolonged stressful and demanding situations, working excessively long hours, or getting insufficient sleep.)

Starting treatment with antidepressants that inhibit reuptake of neurotransmitters into the presynaptic terminals would then exacerbate presynaptic depletion and tend to make depression worse, with increased risk of suicidal thoughts, before longer-term potentially therapeutic effects start to kick in. Antidepressants that work in other ways, or that have a large distribution volume and long half-life in the body (such as fluoxetine) causing buffering and tapering of drug concentration, would be safer.

== Management ==
Young patients should be closely monitored for signs of suicidal ideation or behaviors, especially in the first eight weeks of therapy.

== Methodology ==
=== By prevalence ===
On September 6, 2007, the Centers for Disease Control and Prevention reported that the suicide rate in American adolescents, (especially girls, 10 to 24 years old), increased 8% (2003 to 2004), the largest jump in 15 years, to 4,599 suicides in Americans ages 10 to 24 in 2004, from 4,232 in 2003, giving a suicide rate of 7.32 per 100,000 people that age. The rate previously dropped to 6.78 per 100,000 in 2003 from 9.48 per 100,000 in 1990. Jon Jureidini, a critic of this study, says that the US "2004 suicide figures were compared simplistically with the previous year, rather than examining the change in trends over several years". It has been noted that the pitfalls of such attempts to infer a trend using just two data points (years 2003 and 2004) are further demonstrated by the fact that, according to the new epidemiological data, the suicide rate in 2005 in children and adolescents actually declined despite the continuing decrease of SSRI prescriptions. "It is risky to draw conclusions from limited ecologic analyses of isolated year-to-year fluctuations in antidepressant prescriptions and suicides.

One promising epidemiological approach involves examining the associations between trends in psychotropic medication use and suicide over time across a large number of small geographic regions. Until the results of more detailed analyses are known, prudence dictates deferring judgment concerning the public health effects of the FDA warnings." Subsequent follow-up studies have supported the hypothesis that antidepressant drugs reduce suicide risk.

== Regulatory actions ==
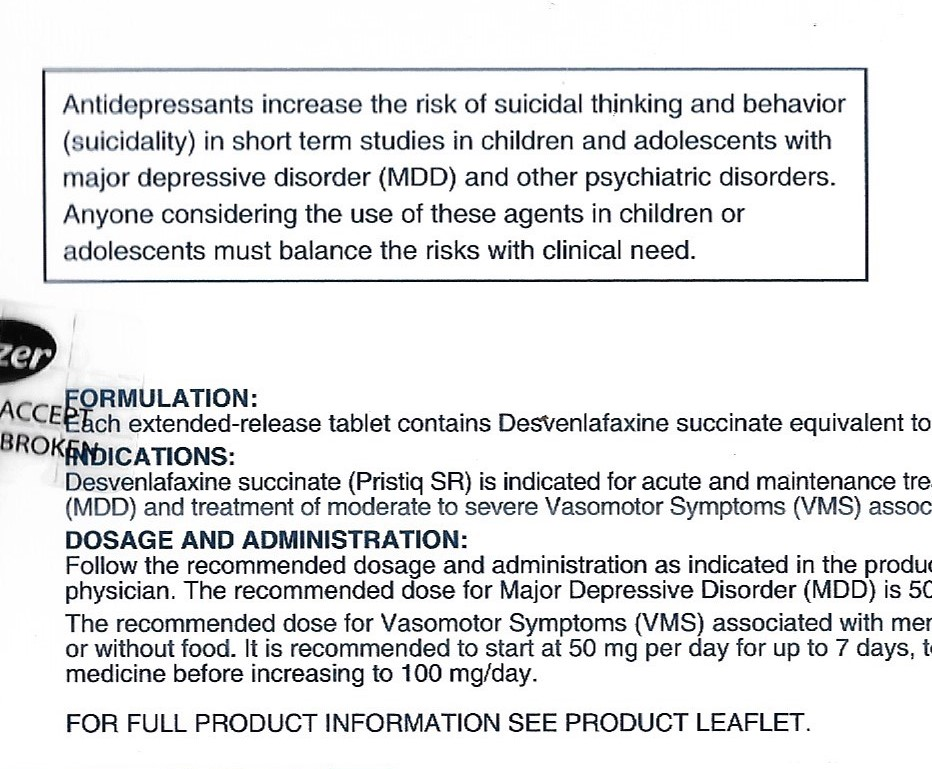
Boxed warning for desvenlafaxine, an SNRI

The Food and Drug Administration (FDA) requires "black box warnings" on all SSRIs, which state that they double suicidal ideation rates (from 2 in 1,000 to 4 in 1,000) in children and adolescents.

In 2004, the Medicines and Healthcare products Regulatory Agency (MHRA) in the United Kingdom judged fluoxetine (Prozac) to be the only antidepressant that offered a favorable risk-benefit ratio in children with depression, though it was also associated with a slight increase in the risk of self-harm and suicidal ideation. Only two SSRIs are licensed for use with children in the UK, sertraline (Zoloft) and fluvoxamine (Luvox), for the treatment of obsessive–compulsive disorder. Fluoxetine is not licensed for this use.

== See also ==
- Selective serotonin reuptake inhibitor § Suicide risk
- Paradoxical effect
- Substance-induced psychosis
