= Candy (2006 film) =

- Theatrical release poster
- Directed by: Neil Armfield
- Written by: Neil Armfield; Luke Davies
- Based on: Candy: A Novel of Love and Addiction by Luke Davies
- Produced by: Margaret Fink; Emile Sherman
- Starring: Heath Ledger; Abbie Cornish; Geoffrey Rush
- Cinematography: Garry Phillips
- Edited by: Dany Cooper
- Music by: Paul Charlier
- Production company: Renaissance Films
- Distributed by: Dendy Films
- Release dates: 15 February 2006 (Berlin); 25 May 2006 (Australia)
- Running time: 108 minutes
- Country: Australia
- Language: English
- Box office: $2.1 million

Candy is a 2006 Australian romantic drama film, adapted from Luke Davies's 1997 novel Candy: A Novel of Love and Addiction. Candy was directed by filmmaker Neil Armfield and stars Heath Ledger, Abbie Cornish and Geoffrey Rush.

Candy, produced by Margaret Fink, was released in Australia on 25 May 2006 and subsequently released worldwide.

== Plot ==
There are three acts of roughly three scenes each, Heaven, Earth, and Hell.

=== Heaven ===
A poet named Dan and an art student named Candy fall passionately in love, as Candy gravitates to his bohemian lifestyle and love of heroin.

Frequently seeking drug money, they borrow from Candy's parents or eccentric university professor Casper, then turn to theft. When Candy sells her grandmother's ring, she has sex with a pawn shop owner for $50.

=== Earth ===
Dan and Candy marry and confront the realities of addiction and family life. Dan purchases the drugs while Candy prostitutes. While considering having sex with men in a park bathroom for money, Dan steals a credit card and scams the owner for his PIN, taking $7000.

Candy becomes pregnant, and despite a few days of tortuously "going clean", their baby is delivered stillborn at 23 weeks. They return to heroin, but stop again, enduring agonizing withdrawal symptoms in the process.

Despite poor living conditions, constant struggles for money, and frequent disputes, the pair remain in love.

=== Hell ===
Dan and Candy move to the country to "try methadone" as a way to ease into a more normal life and eventually quit drugs altogether. After a disastrous attempt to have Candy's parents over for Sunday lunch, Candy screams at her mother about how she is the cause for Candy to "never have been able to unclench [her] fists".

After Dan returns home one day from working as a bricklayer, he finds Candy smoking marijuana with a new man and watches as she later leaves to have sex with him. When she returns, she screams at Dan about how much she hates him and wants him to leave. He returns later to find the walls of every room of the house are covered with poems about Dan and Candy that she has written in smeared makeup.

Distressed, Dan seeks Casper again and takes heroin with him. Dan is informed the next morning of Candy's hospitalization back in Sydney, where he finds her in the aftermath of a nervous breakdown. Dan returns to Casper's only to find him dead of a heroin overdose. This forces Dan to reconsider his life.

While Candy recovers in a treatment clinic, Dan gets clean and finds a job washing dishes at a restaurant while still missing Candy. But when Candy finishes treatment and comes to the restaurant to finish off where they started, he cries and says "There's no going back. If you're given a reprieve, I think it's good to remember just how thin it is." She subsequently leaves.

== Cast ==
- Abbie Cornish as Candy
- Heath Ledger as Dan
- Geoffrey Rush as Casper
- Tom Budge as Schumann
- Roberto Meza Mont as Jorge
- Tony Martin as Jim Wyatt
- Noni Hazlehurst as Elaine Wyatt
- Tim McKenzie as Uncle Rod
- Tara Morice as Aunt Katherine
- Maddi Newling as Janey
- Cristian Castillo as Little Angelo
- Paul Blackwell as Phillip Dudley
- Adrienne Pickering as bank teller
- Nathaniel Dean as Paul Hillman
- Alicia Hannah as neighbour
- Luke Davies as a milkman
- Anni Finsterer as Crystal (uncredited)

== Soundtrack ==
The film features a version of the Tim Buckley song "Song to the Siren", sung by actress/singer Paula Arundell. It also includes the track "Sugar Man" from the debut 1970 album by Detroit singer-songwriter Sixto Rodriguez.

== Reception ==
On Rotten Tomatoes, the film holds an approval rating of 47% with an average rating of 5.76/10, based on 76 reviews. The site's critics consensus reads: "Stars Heath Ledger and Abbie Cornish look better than they should as heroin addicts, and their characters are too absorbed and self-pitying to be totally compelling." On Metacritic, the film has a weighted average score of 57 out of 100, based on 24 critics, indicating "mixed or average reviews".

Peter Bradshaw of The Guardian called it an "excellent, heartfelt film" when compared to Darren Aronofsky's Requiem for a Dream and praised both Cornish and Ledger for delivering "performances of absolute conviction". Geoff Andrew of Time Out felt the film's story was "slightly over-familiar" but gave praise to Armfield's "confident direction" for being "sufficiently fresh and imaginative" and the cast for giving "uniformly strong performances". Russell Edwards of Variety praised Ledger for giving a "warm depiction" to his role and Armfield for showing restraint in his direction, but critiqued that the script suffers from awkward "behaviour and narrative" shifts, being heavily reliant on the actors, and lacking an "emotional vein" in the ending.

== Festivals ==
- 2006 – Germany – Berlin International Film Festival
- 2006 – Hong Kong International Film Festival
- 2006 – Canada – Toronto International Film Festival
- 2006 – UK – BFI London Film Festival
- 2006 – USA – Milwaukee International Film Festival
- 2007 – Singapore – Singapore International Film Festival

== Awards ==
Won:

- 2006 Australian Writers Guild Awards: Feature Film – Adaptation (Luke Davies with Neil Armfield).
- 2006 Film Critics Circle of Australia: Best Actress in a Lead Role (Abbie Cornish), Best Actor in a Supporting Role (Geoffrey Rush).
- 2006 Australian Screen Editors Ellie for Best Editing in a Feature Film Dany Cooper ASE

Nominated:

- 2006 Berlin International Film Festival: Golden Berlin Bear.
- 2006 Film Critics Circle of Australia: Best Actor in a Leading Role (Heath Ledger), Best Actress in a Supporting Role (Noni Hazlehurst), Best Film, Best Director, Best Adapted Screenplay, Best Music Score (Paul Charlier).
- 2006 Australian Film Institute Awards: Best Film, Best Actress in a Leading Role (Abbie Cornish), Best Actor in a Leading Role (Heath Ledger), Best Actor in a Supporting Role (Geoffrey Rush), Best Actress in a Supporting Role (Noni Hazlehurst), Best Adapted Screenplay, Best Editing, Best Production Design.
- 2006 Inside Film Awards: Best Actor (Heath Ledger), Best Actress (Abbie Cornish).

== See also ==
- Cinema of Australia
