= Heath Ledger =

Australian actor (1979–2008)

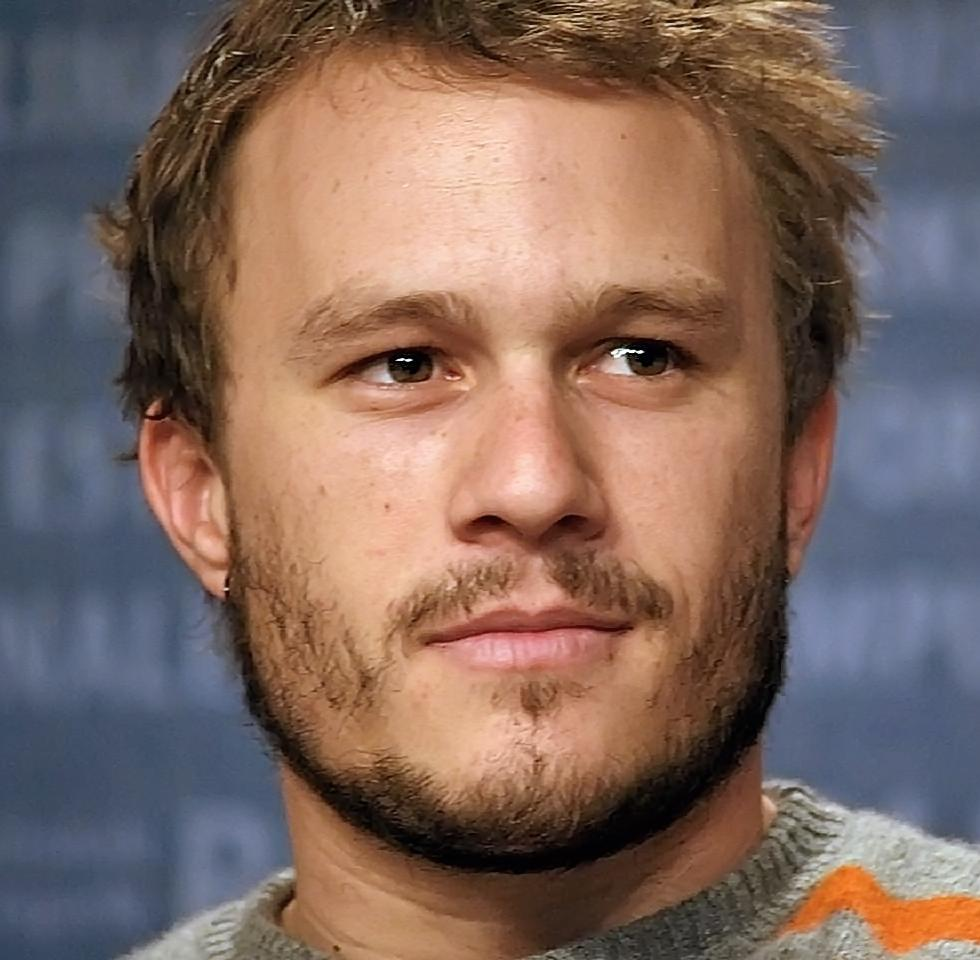
- Ledger in 2006
- Born: Heath Andrew Ledger; 4 April 1979; Perth, Western Australia, Australia
- Died: 22 January 2008 (aged 28); New York City, U.S.
- Cause of death: Accidental drug overdose
- Occupations: Actor; music video director
- Years active: 1991–2008
- Partner: Michelle Williams (2004–2007)
- Children: 1
- Awards: Full list

Heath Andrew Ledger (4 April 1979 – 22 January 2008) was an Australian actor. Known for his versatility across independent and major studio films, his work consisted of 20 films in a variety of genres. His accolades included an Academy Award, an Actor Award, a BAFTA Award, and a Golden Globe Award.

After playing roles in Australian television and film productions during the 1990s, he moved to the United States in 1998 to further develop his film career. His film breakthrough came as the lead in the romantic comedy 10 Things I Hate About You (1999). He gained further recognition for his roles in films such as Two Hands (1999), The Patriot (2000), A Knight's Tale (2001), Monster's Ball (2001), Ned Kelly (2003), and Lords of Dogtown (2005). For his portrayal of Ennis Del Mar in Ang Lee's Brokeback Mountain (2005), he received a nomination for the Academy Award for Best Actor. He also starred in Candy (2006) and portrayed a composite of Bob Dylan's life and persona in Todd Haynes's I'm Not There (2007).

In January 2008, Ledger died from an accidental overdose of prescription drugs. Several months before his death, he had finished filming his role as the Joker in The Dark Knight (2008), which later became his first posthumous release. His performance received widespread media attention and critical acclaim, including the Academy Award for Best Supporting Actor. It has since been regarded as one of the greatest villain performances in film history. His final film, The Imaginarium of Doctor Parnassus, was posthumously released in 2009.

== Early life ==
Heath Andrew Ledger was born on 4 April 1979 in Perth, Western Australia, to Sally Ramshaw, a French teacher, and Kim Ledger, a racing car driver and mining engineer whose family established and owned the Ledger Engineering Foundry. The Sir Frank Ledger Charitable Trust is named after his great-grandfather Frank Ledger. He had English, Irish, and Scottish ancestry. Ledger attended Mary's Mount Primary School in Gooseberry Hill, and later Guildford Grammar School, where he had his first acting experiences, starring in a school production as Peter Pan at age ten. His parents separated when he was ten and divorced when he was eleven. Ledger's older sister Kate, an actress and later a publicist, with whom he was very close, inspired his acting on stage; and his love of Gene Kelly inspired his successful choreography, leading to Guildford Grammar's 60-member team's "first all-boy victory" at the Rock Eisteddfod Challenge. Ledger's two half-sisters are Ashleigh Bell (born 1990), his mother's daughter with her second husband Roger Bell; and Olivia Ledger (born 1996), his father's daughter with his second wife Emma Brown.

== Career ==
=== 1990s ===
After sitting for early graduation exams at age 16 to get his diploma, Ledger left school to pursue an acting career. With Trevor DiCarlo, his best friend since the age of three, Ledger drove across Australia from Perth to Sydney, returning to Perth to take a small role in Clowning Around (1991), the first part of a two-part television series, and to work on the TV series Sweat (1996), in which he played a gay cyclist. From 1993 to 1997, Ledger also had parts in the Perth television series Ship to Shore (1993); Ledger also had parts in the short-lived Fox Broadcasting Company fantasy-drama Roar (1997); in Home and Away (1997), one of Australia's most successful television shows; and in the Australian film Blackrock (1997), his feature film debut. In 1999, he starred in the teen comedy 10 Things I Hate About You and in the acclaimed Australian crime film Two Hands, directed by Gregor Jordan.

=== 2000s ===
In the early 2000s, he starred in supporting roles as Gabriel Martin, the eldest son of Benjamin Martin (Mel Gibson), in The Patriot (2000), and as Sonny Grotowski, the son of Hank Grotowski (Billy Bob Thornton), in Monster's Ball (2001); as well as leading or title roles in A Knight's Tale (2001), The Four Feathers (2002), The Order (2003), Ned Kelly (2003), Casanova (2005), The Brothers Grimm (2005), and Lords of Dogtown (2005). In 2001, he won a ShoWest Award as "Male Star of Tomorrow".

Ledger received "Best Actor of 2005" awards from both the New York Film Critics Circle and the San Francisco Film Critics Circle for his performance in Brokeback Mountain, in which he plays Wyoming ranch hand Ennis Del Mar, who has a love affair with aspiring rodeo rider Jack Twist, played by Jake Gyllenhaal. He also received the nominations for a Golden Globe Award for Best Actor — Motion Picture Drama, an Actor Award for Outstanding Performance by a Male Actor in a Leading Role, a BAFTA Award for Best Actor in a Leading Role, and an Academy Award for Best Actor for this performance, making him, at age 26, the eighth-youngest nominee in the category. In The New York Times review of the film, critic Stephen Holden writes: "Both Mr. Ledger and Mr. Gyllenhaal make this anguished love story physically palpable. Mr. Ledger magically and mysteriously disappears beneath the skin of his lean, sinewy character. It is a great screen performance, as good as the best of Marlon Brando and Sean Penn." In a review in Rolling Stone, Peter Travers states: "Ledger's magnificent performance is an acting miracle. He seems to tear it from his insides. Ledger doesn't just know how Ennis moves, speaks and listens; he knows how he breathes. To see him inhale the scent of a shirt hanging in Jack's closet is to take measure of the pain of love lost."

After Brokeback Mountain, Ledger costarred with fellow Australian Abbie Cornish in the 2006 Australian film Candy, an adaptation of the 1998 novel Candy: A Novel of Love and Addiction, as young heroin addicts in love attempting to break free of their addiction, whose mentor is played by Geoffrey Rush; for his performance as sometime poet Dan, Ledger was nominated for three "Best Actor" awards, including one of the Film Critics Circle of Australia Awards, which both Cornish and Rush won in their categories. Shortly after the release of Candy, Ledger was invited to join the Academy of Motion Picture Arts and Sciences. As one of six actors embodying different aspects of the life of Bob Dylan in the 2007 film I'm Not There, directed by Todd Haynes, Ledger "won praise for his portrayal of 'Robbie [Clark],' a moody, counter-culture actor who represents the romanticist side of Dylan, but says accolades are never his motivation". Posthumously, on 23 February 2008, he shared the 2007 Independent Spirit Robert Altman Award with the rest of the film's ensemble cast, its director, and its casting director.

In his penultimate film role, Ledger played the Joker in Christopher Nolan's 2008 film The Dark Knight, which was released nearly six months after his death. While working on the film in London, Ledger told Sarah Lyall in their New York Times interview that he viewed The Dark Knight's Joker as a "psychopathic, mass murdering, schizophrenic clown with zero empathy". For his performance in The Dark Knight, Ledger posthumously won the Academy Award for Best Supporting Actor (becoming the fourth-youngest winner of the award) which his family accepted on his behalf, as well as numerous other posthumous awards, including the Golden Globe Award for Best Supporting Actor, which Nolan accepted for him. At the time of his death on 22 January 2008, Ledger had completed about half of the work for his final film role as Tony in Terry Gilliam's The Imaginarium of Doctor Parnassus. Gilliam chose to adapt the film after his death by having fellow actors (and friends of Ledger) Johnny Depp, Jude Law, and Colin Farrell play "fantasy transformations" of his character so that Ledger's final performance could be seen in theatres.

=== Directorial work ===
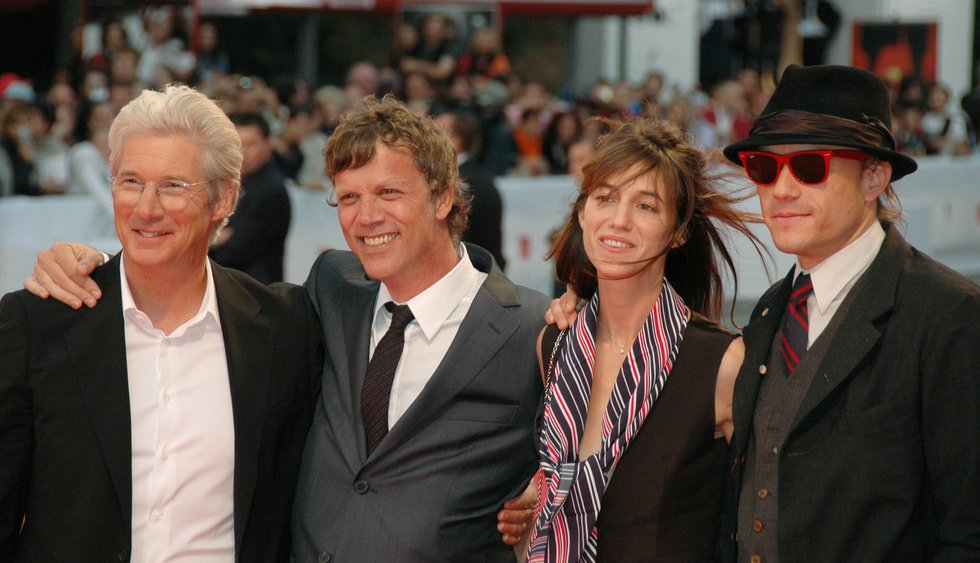
Ledger (far right) posing with the cast and the director of I'm Not There at the 64th Venice Film Festival in September 2007, four months before his death

Ledger had aspirations to become a film director and had made some music videos with his production company The Masses, which director Todd Haynes praised highly in his tribute to Ledger upon accepting the ISP Robert Altman Award, which Ledger posthumously shared, on 23 February 2008. In 2006, Ledger directed music videos for the title track on Australian hip hop artist N'fa's CD debut solo album Cause An Effect and for the single "Seduction Is Evil (She's Hot)". Later that year, Ledger inaugurated a new record label, The Masses Music, with singer Ben Harper and also directed a music video for Harper's song "Morning Yearning".

At a news conference at the 2007 Venice Film Festival, Ledger spoke of his desire to make a documentary film about the British singer-songwriter Nick Drake, who died in 1974, at the age of 26, from an overdose of an antidepressant. Ledger created and acted in a music video set to Drake's recording of the singer's 1974 song about depression, "Black Eyed Dog" — a title "inspired by Winston Churchill's descriptive term for depression" (black dog); it was shown publicly only twice, first at the Bumbershoot Festival, in Seattle, held from 1 to 3 September 2007; and secondly as part of "A Place To Be: A Celebration of Nick Drake", with its screening of Their Place: Reflections On Nick Drake, "a series of short filmed homages to Nick Drake" (including Ledger's), sponsored by American Cinematheque, at the Grauman's Egyptian Theatre, in Hollywood, on 5 October 2007. After Ledger's death, his music video for "Black Eyed Dog" was shown on the Internet and excerpted in news clips distributed via YouTube. (Note: Drake's song "Black Eyed Dog" is featured as track number five on the soundtrack album for the 1998 film Practical Magic, directed by Griffin Dunne and starring Sandra Bullock and Nicole Kidman.)

He was working with Scottish screenwriter and producer Allan Scott on an adaptation of the 1983 novel The Queen's Gambit by Walter Tevis, which would have been his first feature film as a director. He also intended to act in the film, with Canadian actor Elliot Page proposed in the lead role. Ledger's final directorial work, in which he shot two music videos before his death, premiered in 2009. The music videos, completed for Modest Mouse and Grace Woodroofe, include an animated feature for Modest Mouse's song "King Rat", and the Woodroofe video for her cover of David Bowie's "Quicksand". The "King Rat" video premiered on 4 August 2009.

== Press controversies ==
Ledger's relationship with the Australian press was sometimes turbulent, and it led to his abandonment of plans for his family to reside part-time in Sydney. In 2004, he strongly denied press reports alleging that "he spat at journalists on the Sydney set of the film Candy", or that one of his relatives had done so later, outside Ledger's Sydney home. On 13 January 2006, "Several members of the paparazzi retaliated ... squirting Ledger and Williams with water pistols on the red carpet at the Sydney premiere of Brokeback Mountain".

After his performance on stage at the 2005 Screen Actors Guild Awards, when he had giggled in presenting Brokeback Mountain as a nominee for Outstanding Performance by a Cast in a Motion Picture, the Los Angeles Times referred to his presentation as an "apparent gay spoof". Ledger called the Times later and explained that his levity resulted from stage fright, saying that he had been told that he would be presenting the award only minutes earlier; he stated: "I am so sorry and I apologise for my nervousness. I would be absolutely horrified if my stage fright was misinterpreted as a lack of respect for the film, the topic and for the amazing filmmakers."

After learning that two cinemas in Utah refused to show Brokeback Mountain, Ledger said: "I don't think the movie is [controversial] but I think maybe the Mormons in Utah do. I think it's hilarious and very immature of a society". In the same interview with the Herald Sun newspaper, Ledger mistakenly claimed that lynchings had occurred in West Virginia as recently as the 1980s; state scholars disputed his statement, asserting that no documented lynchings had occurred in West Virginia since 1931.

== Personal life ==
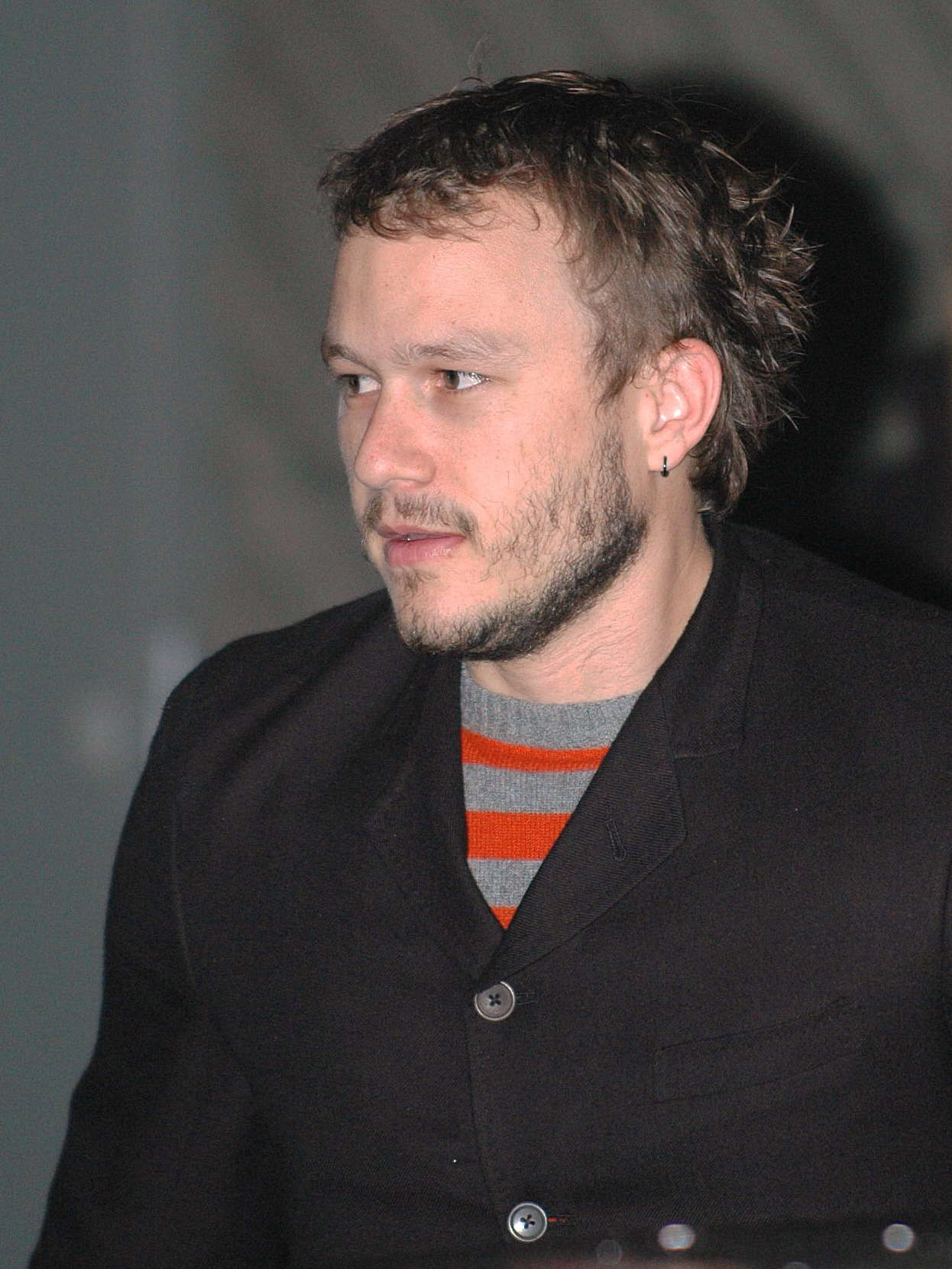
Ledger at the 56th Berlin International Film Festival in February 2006

Ledger was an avid chess player, and had participated in tournaments when he was young. As an adult, he often played with other chess enthusiasts at Washington Square Park in Manhattan. He was a fan of West Coast Eagles, an Australian rules football team that competes in the Australian Football League (AFL) and is based in his hometown of Perth.

Ledger was an "obsessive" photographer who loved taking stills, then drawing over them with paint, markers or nail polish.

=== Relationships ===
Ledger dated Lisa Zane, Christina Cauchi, Heather Graham, and Naomi Watts.

In 2004, Ledger began a relationship with actress Michelle Williams after meeting her on the set of Brokeback Mountain. Their daughter, Matilda Rose Ledger, was born on 28 October 2005 in New York City. Matilda's godparents are Brokeback Mountain co-star Jake Gyllenhaal and Williams's Dawson's Creek co-star Busy Philipps. In January 2006, Ledger listed his residence in Bronte, Sydney, for sale and returned to the US, where he shared a house with Williams in Boerum Hill, Brooklyn from 2005 to 2007. In September 2007, Williams's father confirmed to The Daily Telegraph that Ledger and Williams had broken up.

After Ledger's breakup with Williams, the press linked him romantically with supermodel Helena Christensen, actress Kate Hudson, and model Gemma Ward. Ward later stated that she had begun dating Ledger in November 2007 and that they and their families had spent that year's Christmas together in their hometown of Perth.

=== Health problems and drug use ===
In an interview with Sarah Lyall, published in The New York Times on 4 November 2007, Ledger stated that he often could not sleep when taking on roles, and that the role of the Joker in The Dark Knight (2008) was causing his usual insomnia: "Last week I probably slept an average of two hours a night. ... I couldn't stop thinking. My body was exhausted, and my mind was still going." At that time, he told Lyall that he had taken two Ambien pills, after taking just one had not sufficed, and those left him in "a stupor, only to wake up an hour later, his mind still racing".

Prior to his return to New York City from his last film assignment in London, in January 2008, while he was apparently suffering from some kind of respiratory illness, he reportedly complained to his The Imaginarium of Doctor Parnassus co-star Christopher Plummer that he was continuing to have difficulty sleeping and taking pills to help with that problem: "Confirming earlier reports that Ledger hadn't been feeling well on set, Plummer said: 'we all caught colds because we were shooting outside on horrible, damp nights. But Heath's went on and I don't think he dealt with it immediately with the antibiotics.... I think what he did have was the walking pneumonia.' [...] On top of that, 'He was saying all the time, 'dammit, I can't sleep'... and he was taking all these pills to help him'".

Speaking to Interview magazine after Ledger's death, Michelle Williams confirmed reports that the actor had experienced trouble sleeping: "For as long as I'd known him, he had bouts with insomnia. He had too much energy. His mind was turning, turning, turning – always turning".

Ledger was "widely reported to have struggled with substance abuse". Following Ledger's death, Entertainment Tonight aired video footage from 2006 in which Ledger stated that he "used to smoke five joints a day for 20 years" and news outlets reported that his drug abuse had prompted Williams to request that he move out of their apartment in Brooklyn. Ledger's publicist asserted that reports of the drug use had been inaccurate.

== Death ==
At around 3 p.m. Eastern Standard Time on Tuesday, 22 January 2008, Ledger was found lying face down unresponsive in his bed by his housekeeper, Teresa Solomon, and his massage therapist, Diana Wolozin, in his loft at 421 Broome Street in the SoHo neighbourhood of Manhattan.

According to police, Wolozin, who had arrived early for a 3 p.m. appointment with Ledger, telephoned his friend Mary-Kate Olsen for help. Olsen, who was in Los Angeles at the time, directed her New York City private security guard to go to the scene. At 3:26 p.m., "less than 15 minutes after she first saw him in bed and only a few moments after the first call to Ms. Olsen", Wolozin dialed 911 "to say that Mr. Ledger was not breathing". At the urging of the 911 operator, Wolozin administered CPR, which was unsuccessful in reviving him.

Paramedics and emergency medical technicians arrived seven minutes later, at 3:33 p.m. but were also unable to revive him. At 3:36 p.m., Ledger was pronounced dead, and his body was removed from the apartment. He was 28 years old.

=== Autopsy and toxicology report ===
On 6 February 2008, the Office of Chief Medical Examiner of the City of New York released its conclusions. Those conclusions were based on an initial autopsy that occurred 23 January 2008, and a subsequent complete toxicological analysis. The report concluded that Ledger died "as the result of acute intoxication by the combined effects of oxycodone, hydrocodone, diazepam, temazepam, alprazolam and doxylamine". It added: "We have concluded that the manner of death is accident[al], resulting from the abuse of prescribed medications."

Although the Associated Press and other outlets reported that police estimated Ledger's death occurred between 1 p.m. and 2:45 p.m. on 22 January 2008, the Medical Examiner's Office announced that it would not publicly disclose the official estimated time of death. The official announcement of the cause and manner of Ledger's death heightened concerns about the growing problems of prescription drug abuse or misuse and combined drug intoxication (CDI).

In 2017, Jason Payne-James, a forensic pathologist, asserted that Ledger might have survived if hydrocodone and oxycodone had been left out of the combination of drugs that the actor took just before his death. He furthermore stated that the mixture of drugs, combined with a possible chest infection, caused Ledger to stop breathing.

=== Federal investigation ===
Late in February 2008, a DEA investigation of medical professionals relating to Ledger's death exonerated two American physicians, who practice in Los Angeles and Houston, of any wrongdoing, determining that "the doctors in question had prescribed Ledger other medications—not the pills that killed him."

On 4 August 2008, Mary-Kate Olsen's attorney Michael Miller issued a statement denying that Olsen supplied Ledger with the drugs causing his death and asserting that she did not know their source. In his statement, Miller said specifically, "Despite tabloid speculation, Mary-Kate Olsen had nothing whatsoever to do with the drugs found in Heath Ledger's home or his body, and she does not know where he obtained them."

After a flurry of further media speculation, on 6 August 2008, the U.S. Attorney's Office in Manhattan closed its investigation into Ledger's death without filing any charges and rendering moot its subpoena of Olsen. With the clearing of the two doctors and Olsen, and the closing of the investigation because the prosecutors in the Manhattan U.S. Attorney's Office "don't believe there's a viable target," it is still not known how Ledger obtained the oxycodone and hydrocodone in the lethal drug combination that killed him.

=== Estate ===
Ledger's will was filed in New York City on 28 February 2008. His father, Kim Ledger, said that he considered the financial well-being of Heath's daughter Matilda Rose an "absolute priority," whilst also stating that her mother, Michelle Williams, was "an integral part of our family". He added, "They will be taken care of and that's how Heath would want it to be". Ledger's will was signed in 2003, prior to his involvement with Williams and the birth of their daughter; the will divided half of his estate between his parents and half between his siblings.

A 31 March 2008 report asserted that Ledger may have fathered another child. The mother and stepfather of the child in question dismissed the claim.

On 27 September 2008, Kim Ledger stated that the family had agreed to leave Ledger's US$16.3 million estate to Matilda Rose Ledger.

== Legacy ==
=== Memorial tributes and services ===
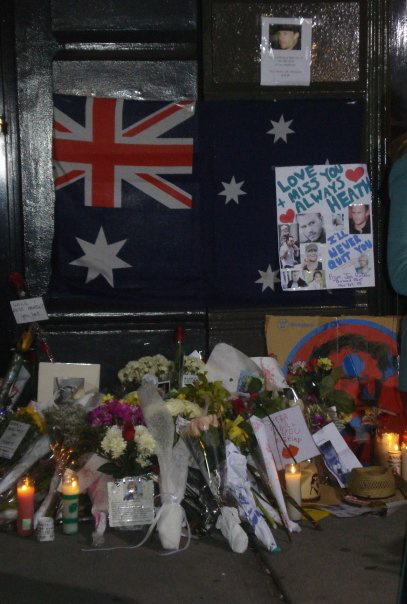
Memorial for Ledger, outside 421 Broome Street, SoHo, Manhattan, 23 January 2008

As the news of Ledger's death became public, throughout the night of 22 January 2008, and the following day, media crews, mourners, fans, and other onlookers began gathering outside his apartment building, with some leaving flowers or other memorial tributes.

The following day, at 10:50 am AWST, Ledger's parents and sister appeared outside his mother's house in Applecross, a riverside suburb of Perth, and read a short statement to the media expressing their grief and desire for privacy. Within the next few days, memorial tributes were communicated by family members, Kevin Rudd (then-Prime Minister of Australia), Eric Ripper (then-Deputy Premier of Western Australia), Warner Bros. (distributor of The Dark Knight) and thousands of Ledger's fans around the world.

Several actors made statements expressing their sorrow at Ledger's death, including Daniel Day-Lewis, who dedicated his Screen Actors Guild Award to him, saying that he was inspired by Ledger's acting; Day-Lewis praised Ledger's performances in Monster's Ball and Brokeback Mountain, describing the latter as "unique, perfect". Verne Troyer, who was working with Ledger on The Imaginarium of Doctor Parnassus at the time of his death, had a heart shape, an exact duplicate of a symbol that Ledger scrawled on a piece of paper with his email address, tattooed on his hand in remembrance of Ledger because Ledger "had made such an impression on [him]". On 1 February, in her first public statement after Ledger's death, Michelle Williams expressed her heartbreak and described Ledger's spirit as surviving in their daughter.

After attending private memorial ceremonies in Los Angeles, Ledger's family members returned with his body to Perth. On 9 February, a memorial service attended by several hundred invited guests was held at Penrhos College, attracting considerable press attention; afterwards, Ledger's body was cremated at Fremantle Cemetery, followed by a private service attended by only 10 of his closest family members. The ashes were taken from Fremantle for interment at an unspecified location. Later that night, his family and friends gathered for a wake on Cottesloe Beach.

The Eskimo Joe song "Foreign Land" was written as a tribute to Ledger. The band were in New York at the time of his death.

In January 2011, the State Theatre Centre of Western Australia in Ledger's home town of Perth named a 575-seat theatre the Heath Ledger Theatre after him. For the opening of the theatre, Ledger's Academy Award for Best Supporting Actor was on display in the theatre's foyer along with his Joker costume.

Bon Iver's "Perth" was inspired by Heath Ledger. Justin Vernon, the lead singer and songwriter of the American indie folk band, revealed in 2011 that he had begun working on the song in 2008 and was scheduled to meet with a music video director who was good friends with Ledger, Matt Amato. "The first thing I worked on, the riff and the beginning melodies, was the first song on the record, 'Perth,'" Vernon told Exclaim!. Amato was directing the band's "The Wolves (Act I & II)" music video the day that Ledger died. "It was no longer about just making a Bon Iver music video anymore," Vernon says. "This was now our chance to be there with Matt as he grieved. It was a three-day wake." Amato told Vernon stories about Ledger that eventually became the inspiration for "Perth," the opening track to the band's second studio album Bon Iver, Bon Iver (2011).

In October 2026, Ledger's 10 Things I Hate About You co-star Julia Stiles paid tribute to him by dedicating her dance to Ledger during "Dedication Night" on season 35 of Dancing with the Stars. Ledger's fellow 10 Things I Hate About You co-stars: Joseph Gordon-Levitt, Larisa Oleynik, Andrew Keegan, Gabrielle Union, and Susan May Pratt joined her.

=== Method and style ===
Ledger on the March 2006 cover of Rolling Stone

"You know when you see the preachers down South? And they grab a believer and they go, 'Bwoom! I touch you with the hand of God!' And they believe so strongly, they're on the ground shaking and spitting. And fuck's sake, that's the power of belief... Now, I don't believe in Jesus, but I believe in my performance. And if you can understand that the power of belief is one of the great tools of our time and that a lot of acting comes from it, you can do anything."

— Ledger, during the interview with Rolling Stone in 2006, on belief, power and acting

Portraying a variety of roles, from romantic heroes to tragic characters, Ledger created a hodgepodge of characters that are deliberately unlike one another, stating: "I feel like I am wasting my time if I repeat myself". He also reflected on his inability to be happy with his work, "I feel the same thing about everything I do. The day I say, 'It's good' is the day I should start doing something else." Ledger liked to wait between jobs so that he would start creatively hungry on new projects. In his own words, acting was about harnessing "the infinite power of belief," thus using belief as a tool for creating.

Directors who have worked with the actor praised him for his creativity, seriousness, and intuition. "I've never felt as old as I did watching Heath explore his talents," The Dark Knight director Christopher Nolan has written, expressing amazement over the actor's working process, genuine curiosity and charisma. Marc Forster, who directed Ledger in Monster's Ball, complimented him as taking the job "very seriously", being disciplined, observant, understanding, and intuitive. In 2007, director Todd Haynes compared Ledger's presence to actor James Dean, casting Ledger as Robbie Clarke, a fictive personification of Bob Dylan in I'm Not There. Drawing on the similar characteristics between the actors, Haynes further highlighted Ledger's "precocious seriousness" and intuition. He also felt that Ledger had a rare maturity beyond his years." Ledger, however, disconnected himself and acting from perfectionism. "I'm always gonna pull myself apart and dissect [the work]. I mean, there's no such thing as perfection in what [actors] do. Pornos are more perfect than we are, because they're actually fucking."

"Some people find their shtick," Ledger reflected on the categorisation of style. "I never figured out who 'Heath Ledger' is on film: 'This is what you expect when you hire me, and it will be recognisable'... People always feel compelled to sum you up, to presume that they have you and can describe you. That's fine. But there are so many stories inside of me and a lot I want to achieve outside of one flat note."

=== Posthumous films and awards ===
Ledger's death affected the marketing campaign for Christopher Nolan's The Dark Knight (2008) and also both the production and marketing of Terry Gilliam's film The Imaginarium of Doctor Parnassus, with both directors intending to celebrate and pay tribute to his work in these films. Although Gilliam temporarily suspended production on the latter film, he expressed determination to "salvage" it, perhaps using computer-generated imagery (CGI), and dedicated it to Ledger. In February 2008, as a "memorial tribute to the man many have called one of the best actors of his generation," Johnny Depp, Jude Law, and Colin Farrell signed on to take over Ledger's role, becoming multiple incarnations of his character, Tony, transformed in this "magical re-telling of the Faust story". The three actors donated their fees for the film to Ledger's and Williams's daughter.

Speaking of editing The Dark Knight, on which Ledger had completed his work in October 2007, Nolan recalled, "It was tremendously emotional, right when he passed, having to go back in and look at him every day. ... But the truth is, I feel very lucky to have something productive to do, to have a performance that he was very, very proud of, and that he had entrusted to me to finish." All of Ledger's scenes appear as he completed them in the filming; in editing the film, Nolan added no "digital effects" to alter Ledger's actual performance posthumously. Nolan dedicated the film in part to Ledger's memory, as well as to the memory of technician Conway Wickliffe, who was killed during a car accident while preparing one of the film's stunts.

Released in July 2008, The Dark Knight broke several box office records and received both popular and critical accolades, especially with regard to Ledger's performance as the Joker. Even film critic David Denby, who does not praise the film overall in his pre-release review in The New Yorker, evaluates Ledger's work highly, describing his performance as both "sinister and frightening" and Ledger as "mesmerizing in every scene", concluding: "His performance is a heroic, unsettling final act: this young actor looked into the abyss." Attempting to dispel widespread speculations that Ledger's performance as the Joker had in any way led to his death (as Denby and others suggest), Ledger's co-star and friend Christian Bale, who played opposite him as Batman, has stressed that, as an actor, Ledger greatly enjoyed meeting the challenges of creating that role, an experience that Ledger himself described as "the most fun I've ever had, or probably ever will have, playing a character". Terry Gilliam also rejected the claims that playing the Joker made him crazy, calling it "absolute nonsense" and going on to say, "Heath was so solid. His feet were on the ground and he was the least neurotic person I've ever met."

Ledger received numerous awards for his Joker role in The Dark Knight. On 10 November 2008, he was nominated for two People's Choice Awards related to his work on the film, "Best Ensemble Cast" and "Best Onscreen Match-Up" (shared with Christian Bale), and Ledger won an award for "Match-Up" in the ceremony aired live on CBS in January 2009.

On 11 December 2008, it was announced that Ledger had been nominated for a Golden Globe Award for Best Supporting Actor – Motion Picture for his performance as the Joker in The Dark Knight; he subsequently won the award at the 66th Golden Globe Awards ceremony telecast on NBC on 11 January 2009, with Dark Knight director Christopher Nolan accepting on his behalf.

Film critics, co-stars Maggie Gyllenhaal and Michael Caine and many of Ledger's peers in the film community joined Bale in calling for and predicting a nomination for the 2008 Academy Award for Best Supporting Actor in recognition of Ledger's achievement in The Dark Knight. Ledger's subsequent nomination was announced on 22 January 2009, the anniversary of his death.

Ledger went on to win the Academy Award for Best Supporting Actor, becoming the second person to win a posthumous Academy Award for acting (after fellow Australian actor Peter Finch, who won for 1976's Network), as well as the first comic-book movie actor to win an Oscar for their acting. Ledger's family attended the ceremony on 22 February 2009, with his parents and sister accepting the award onstage on his behalf. Following talks with the Ledger family in Australia, the academy determined that Ledger's daughter, Matilda Rose, would own the award. However, due to Matilda's age, she would not gain full ownership of the statuette until her eighteenth birthday in 2023. Her mother, Michelle Williams, would hold the statuette in trust for Matilda until that time.

On 4 April 2017, a trailer was released for the documentary I Am Heath Ledger, which was released on 3 May 2017. It features archival footage of Ledger and interviews.

== Filmography ==
=== Film ===
Year	Title	Role	Director	Notes	Ref.
1997	Blackrock	Toby Ackland	Steven Vidler		
1997	Paws	Oberon	Karl Zwicky		
1999	10 Things I Hate About You	Patrick Verona	Gil Junger		
1999	Two Hands	Jimmy	Gregor Jordan		
2000	The Patriot	Gabriel Martin	Roland Emmerich		
2001	A Knight's Tale	William Thatcher	Brian Helgeland		
2001	Monster's Ball	Sonny Grotowski	Marc Forster		
2002	The Four Feathers	Harry Faversham	Shekhar Kapur		
2003	Ned Kelly	Ned Kelly	Gregor Jordan		
2003	The Order	Alex Bernier	Brian Helgeland		
2005	Lords of Dogtown	Skip Engblom	Catherine Hardwicke		
2005	The Brothers Grimm	Jacob Grimm	Terry Gilliam		
2005	Brokeback Mountain	Ennis Del Mar	Ang Lee		
2005	Casanova	Giacomo Casanova	Lasse Hallström		
2006	Candy	Dan Carter	Neil Armfield		
2007	I'm Not There	Robbie Clark / Bob Dylan	Todd Haynes		
2008	The Dark Knight	The Joker	Christopher Nolan	Academy Award for Best Supporting Actor (posthumous release)	
2009	The Imaginarium of Doctor Parnassus	Tony Shepard	Terry Gilliam	Last film role (posthumous release)	

=== Television ===
Year	Title	Role	Notes	Ref.
1991	Clowning Around	Orphan clown	TV movie; debut role (uncredited)	
1993	Ship to Shore	Cyclist	Seasons 1–2 (3 episodes)	
1996	Sweat	Snowy Bowles	Season 1 (26 episodes)	
1997	Home and Away	Scott Irwin	Season 10 (9 episodes)	
1997	Roar	Conor	Season 1 (13 episodes)	
2017	I Am Heath Ledger	Himself	Posthumous release; archive footage	

=== Music videos ===
Year	Title	Performer	Notes	Ref.
2006	"Cause an Effect"	N'fa	Also director	
2006	"Seduction is Evil (She's Hot)"	N'fa	Also director	
2006	"Morning Yearning"	Ben Harper	Also director	
2007	"Black Eyed Dog"	Nick Drake	Also director and featuring himself	
2009	"Quicksand"	Grace Woodroofe	Also director	
2009	"King Rat"	Modest Mouse	Animated video; conceived by himself	

== Accolades ==
Ledger's accolades include an Academy Award, an Actor Award, a British Academy Film Award, a Critics' Choice Movie Award, and a Golden Globe Award.

== See also ==
- List of Academy Award winners and nominees from Australia
- List of oldest and youngest Academy Award winners and nominees
- List of posthumous Academy Award winners and nominees
- List of Golden Globe winners
- List of Australian film actors
