= 13th AACTA Awards =

Australian film and television award ceremony

- Sponsored by: Foxtel
- Date: 8 February 2024 (industry luncheon); 10 February 2024 (main ceremony)
- Location: Home of the Arts, Gold Coast, Queensland, Australia
- Hosted by: Rebel Wilson

Highlights
- Most nominations: The Newsreader (15)
- Best Film: Talk to Me
- Best Drama Series: The Newsreader
- Best Comedy Series: Colin from Accounts

Television/radio coverage
- Networks
- Docos; Network 10

The 13th Australian Academy of Cinema and Television Arts Awards (generally known as the AACTA Awards) is an awards ceremony to celebrate the best Australian films and television of 2023. The main ceremony took place on 10 February 2024 at the Home of the Arts on the Gold Coast and was broadcast on Network 10 and Arena.

Previously held towards the end of each year, the date was moved to early 2024 instead of December 2023, which was designed to bring the Australian ceremony in line with the global awards season and the international awards schedule.

In 2024, the previously single award for Best Casting was split by film and television. Awards for comedy were expanded to include Best Acting in a Comedy, Best Comedy Entertainment Program and Best Online Drama or Comedy.

The nominations were announced on 8 December 2023.

== Feature film ==
The nominations are as follows, with the winners in bold at the top of each category:

**Best Film**: **Talk to Me – Samantha Jennings, Kristina Ceyton**; Of an Age – Kristina Ceyton, Samantha Jennings; Shayda – Vincent Sheehan, Noora Niasari; Sweet As – Liz Kearney; The New Boy – Kath Shelper, Andrew Upton, Cate Blanchett, Lorenzo de Maio; The Royal Hotel – Liz Watts, Emile Sherman, Iain Canning, Kath Shelper	**Best Indie Film**: **Limbo – Ivan Sen, David Jowsey, Greer Simpkin, Rachel Higgins**; A Savage Christmas – Madeleine Dyer, Ben McNeill, Daniel Mulvihill; Monolith – Matt Vesely, Bettina Hamilton; Streets of Colour – Ronnie S Riskalla, Yolandi Franken; The Rooster – Mark Leonard Winter, Geraldine Hakewill, MahVeen Shahraki; The Survival of Kindness – Rolf de Heer, Julie Byrne
**Best Direction**: **Danny and Michael Philippou – Talk to Me**; Goran Stolevski – Of an Age; Noora Niasari – Shayda; Jub Clerc – Sweet As; Warwick Thornton – The New Boy; Kitty Green – The Royal Hotel	**Best Screenplay in Film**: **Danny Philippou, Bill Hinzman – Talk to Me**; Goran Stolevski – Of an Age; Noora Niasari – Shayda; Warwick Thornton – The New Boy; Kitty Green, Oscar Redding – The Royal Hotel
**Best Lead Actor**: **Aswan Reid – The New Boy**; Elias Anton – Of an Age; Simon Baker – Limbo; Thom Green – Of an Age; Phoenix Raei – The Rooster; Osamah Sami – Shayda	**Best Lead Actress**: **Sophie Wilde – Talk to Me**; Zar Amir Ebrahimi – Shayda; Shantae Barnes-Cowan – Sweet As; Cate Blanchett – The New Boy; Julia Garner – The Royal Hotel; Sarah Snook – Run Rabbit Run
**Best Supporting Actor**: **Hugo Weaving – The Rooster**; Mojean Aria – Shayda; Eric Bana – Blueback; Wayne Blair – The New Boy; Rob Collins – Limbo; Zoe Terakes – Talk to Me	**Best Supporting Actress**: **Deborah Mailman – The New Boy**; Alex Jensen – Talk to Me; Tasma Walton – Sweet As; Mia Wasikowska – Blueback; Ursula Yovich – The Royal Hotel; Selina Zahednia – Shayda
**Best Cinematography**: **Warwick Thornton – The New Boy**; Carl Allison – Godless: The Eastfield Exorcism; Sherwin Akbarzadeh – Shayda; Katie Milwright – Sweet As; Aaron McLisky – Talk to Me	**Best Editing**: **Geoff Lamb – Talk to Me**; Dany Cooper – Carmen; Michelle McGilvray, Matt Villa, Courtney Teixera – Scarygirl; Katie Flaxman – Sweet As; Nick Meyers – The New Boy
**Best Original Music Score**: **Cornel Wilczek – Talk to Me**; Nigel Westlake – Blueback; Dmitri Golovko – Godless: The Eastfield Exorcism; Me-Lee Hay – Suka; Sam Weiss – The Big Dog	**Best Sound**: **Emma Bortignon, Pete Smith, Nick Steele – Talk to Me**; Benni Knop – Godless: The Eastfield Exorcism; Stuart Morton & Cameron Grant – Scarygirl; Sam Hayward, Angus Robertson, Guntis Sics, Danielle Wiessner – Seriously Red; Anthony Marsh – Three Chords and the Truth
**Best Production Design**: **Amy Baker – The New Boy**; Steven Jones-Evans – Carmen; Nathan Jurevicius – Scarygirl; Matthew Putland – The Portable Door; Michelle McGahey, Bill Booth & Gillian Butler – True Spirit	**Best Costume Design**: **Emily Seresin – Carmen**; Lien See Leong – Blueback; Tim Chappel – Seriously Red; Heather Wallace – The New Boy; Ellen Stanistreet – The Rooster
**Best Casting**: **Anousha Zarkesh – Shayda**; Allison Meadows & Keziah Morgan – Run Rabbit Run; Jane Norris – Sweet As; Anousha Zarkesh – The New Boy; Kirsty McGregor – The Royal Hotel

== Television ==
Best Drama Series: The Newsreader – Joanna Werner, Michael Lucas – Werner Film Productions (ABC); Bay of Fires – Marta Dusseldorp, Yvonne Collins – Archipelago Productions and Fremantle Australia (ABC); Black Snow – Kaylene Butler, Lois Randall, Rosemary Blight – Goalpost Pictures (Stan); Bump – Dan Edwards, John Edwards, Claudia Karvan, Kelsey Munro – Roadshow Rough Diamond (Stan); Erotic Stories – Liam Heyen, Helen Bowden, Jason Stephens – Lingo Pictures (SBS); Love Me – Nicole O'Donohue, Hamish Lewis, Michael Brooks – Warner Bros. International Television Production (Binge)	Best Miniseries: The Lost Flowers of Alice Hart – Jodi Matterson, Bruna Papandrea, Steve Hutensky, Barbara Gibbs, Sarah Lambert, Glendyn Ivin – Made Up Stories, Amazon Studios, Fifth Season (Amazon Prime Video); Bad Behaviour – Amanda Higgs – Matchbox Pictures (Stan); In Our Blood – Nathan Mayfield, Tracey Robertson – Hoodlum Entertainment (ABC); Safe Home – Imogen Banks, Emelyne Palmer – Kindling Pictures (SBS); The Clearing – Jude Troy, Richard Finlayson, Matt Cameron, Elise McCredie, Jeffrey Walker – Wooden Horse (Disney+); While the Men Are Away – Lisa Shaunessy, Alexandra Burke, Kim Wilson, Elissa Down – Arcadia (SBS)
Best Comedy Series: Colin from Accounts – Ian Collie, Rob Gibson, Patrick Brammall, Harriet Dyer – Easy Tiger (Binge, Foxtel); Deadloch – Kate McCartney, Kate McLennan, Andrew Walker, Kevin Whyte – Guesswork Television, OK Great Productions and Amazon Studios (Amazon Prime Video); Fisk – Vincent Sheehan, Kitty Flanagan – Origma 45 (ABC); Gold Diggers – Ujuk Linda, John-Paul Sarni, Muffy Potter, Kate Butler – KOJO Studios (ABC); Upright – Jason Stephens, Meg O'Connell, Tim Minchin, Helen Bowden – Lingo Pictures (Foxtel); Utopia – Michael Hirsh, Deb Herman – Working Dog Productions (ABC)	Best Entertainment Series: Eurovision Song Contest 2023: Grand Final – Paul Clarke, Emily Griggs – Blink TV Production (SBS); Dancing with the Stars – Peter Beck, Kylie Washington, Deb Spinocchia – BBC Studios Australia (Seven Network); Lego Masters: Grand Masters – David McDonald, AJ Johnson, Di Yang – Endemol Shine Australia (Nine Network); Mastermind – Lucy De Luca, Kylie Washington, Deb Spinocchia – BBC Studios Australia (SBS); The 1% Club – John Leahy, Deb Spinocchia, Kylie Washington – BBC Studios Australia (Seven Network); The Amazing Race Australia: Celebrity Edition – Rikkie Proost – Eureka Productions (Network 10)
Best Comedy Entertainment Program: Hard Quiz – Chris Walker, Kevin Whyte, Tom Gleeson, John Tabbagh – Thinkative Television (ABC); RocKwiz – Ken Connor, Peter Bain-Hogg, Brian Nankervis, Joe Connor – Renegade Films (Foxtel); Taskmaster Australia – Cam Bakker – Kevin & Co and Avalon (Network 10); Thank God You're Here – Michael Hirsh, Deb Herman, Rob Sitch – Working Dog Productions (Network 10); The Cheap Seats – Michael Hirsh, Deb Herman, Rob Sitch – Working Dog Productions (Network 10); The Weekly with Charlie Pickering – Chris Walker, Kevin Whyte, Charlie Pickering, Julia Holmes – Thinkative Television (ABC)	Best Factual Entertainment Program: Old People's Home for Teenagers – Tony De La Pena, Tara McWilliams, Emily Potts – Endemol Shine Australia (ABC); Alone Australia – Riima Daher, Beth Hart – ITV Studios Australia (SBS); Gogglebox Australia – David McDonald, Will Minchin, Danielle Vos – Endemol Shine Australia (Foxtel, Network 10); Kitchen Cabinet – Julie Hanna, Madeleine Hawcroft, Annabel Crabb, Rebecca Lamond (ABC); Take 5 with Zan Rowe – Nikita Agzarian, Josh Schmidt, Zan Rowe, Phoebe Bennett (ABC); Who The Bloody Hell Are We? – Tony Jackson, David Collins, Nick McInerney – Chemical Media (SBS)
Best Lifestyle Program: Gardening Australia – Gill Lomas, Rachel Coffey – ABCTV (ABC); Adam and Poh's Great Australian Bites – Adam Liaw – i8 Studio (SBS); Grand Designs Australia – Brooke Bayvel, Michael Collett – Fremantle (Foxtel); Love It or List It Australia – Karen Warner, Geoff Fitzpatrick, Caroline Audcent, Howard Myers – Beyond Productions (Binge, Foxtel); Selling Houses Australia – Nicole Rogers, Monique Bushby, Kam Vurlow – Warner Bros. International Television Production (Foxtel); The Great Australian Bake Off – Alenka Henry, Howard Myers, Kylie Washington, Deb Spinocchia – BBC Studios Australia (Foxtel)	Best Reality Series: MasterChef Australia – David Forster, Simon Child, Eoin Maher, April Mackay – Endemol Shine Australia (Network 10); Australian Survivor: Heroes V Villains – Amelia Fisk, David Forster, Maria Handas, Toby Trappel – Endemol Shine Australia (Network 10); FBOY Island Australia – Caroline Swift, Anson Charody-Bognar, Dean Toccini, Laura Cassidy – Warner Bros. International Television Production (Binge); Hunted Australia – Marty Benson, Natalie Cattach, Ben Davis – Endemol Shine Australia (Network 10); The Real Housewives of Sydney – Samantha Martin, Natalie Brosnan, Dan Sheldon – Matchbox Pictures (Binge, Foxtel); RuPaul's Drag Race Down Under – Amanda Duthie, Cailah Scobie – World of Wonder (Stan)
Best Children's Series: Bluey – Charlie Aspinwall, Sam Moor, Daley Pearson – Ludo Studio (ABC); Barrumbi Kids – Monica O'Brien, Danielle Maclean, Julia Morris – Ambience Entertainment & Tamarind Tree Pictures (NITV, SBS); Beep and Mort – Kaye Weeks – Windmill Pictures (ABC); Crazy Fun Park – Joanna Werner – Werner Film Productions (ABC); The PM's Daughter – Tim Powell, Kieran Hoyle, Warren Clarke, Yingna Lu – Fremantle (ABC); Turn Up The Volume – Philippa Campey, Amanda Higgs, Rachel Davis – Matchbox Pictures & Film Camp (ABC)	Best Stand-Up Special: Something Special – Hannah Gadsby – Guesswork Television (Netflix); If Weren't Filmed, Nobody Would Believe – Aaron Chen – Junkyard Artists (YouTube Premium); Fine, thanks – Celeste Barber – Big Yellow Taxi Productions (Netflix); High & Dry – Jim Jefferies – Nugget Productions (Netflix); Hoo Cares!? – Lizzy Hoo – Guesswork Television (Amazon Prime Video); Rhys Nicholson's Big Queer Comedy Concert – Rhys Nicholson, – Big Yellow Taxi Productions (Amazon Prime Video)
Best Lead Actor in Drama: Hugo Weaving – Love Me; Tim Draxl – In Our Blood; Travis Fimmel – Black Snow; Joel Lago – Erotic Stories; Sam Reid – The Newsreader; Richard Roxburgh – Bali 2002	Best Lead Actress in Drama: Anna Torv – The Newsreader; Kate Box – Erotic Stories; Aisha Dee – Safe Home; Bojana Novakovic – Love Me; Teresa Palmer – The Clearing; Sigourney Weaver – The Lost Flowers of Alice Hart
Best Supporting Actor in Drama: Hunter Page-Lochard – The Newsreader; Tim Draxl – Erotic Stories; Alexander England – Black Snow; William McInnes – The Newsreader; Bob Morley – Love Me; Guy Pearce – The Clearing	Best Supporting Actress in Drama: Heather Mitchell – Love Me; Alycia Debnam-Carey – The Lost Flowers of Alice Hart; Marg Downey – The Newsreader; Michelle Lim Davidson – The Newsreader; Leah Purcell – The Lost Flowers of Alice Hart; Brooke Satchwell – Black Snow
Best Comedy Performer: Cal Wilson – The Great Australian Bake Off; Tom Gleeson – Hard Quiz; Jim Jefferies – The 1% Club; Luke McGregor – Taskmaster Australia; Rhys Nicholson – RuPaul's Drag Race Down Under; Nina Oyama – Taskmaster Australia; Charlie Pickering – The Weekly with Charlie Pickering; Natalie Tran – The Great Australian Bake Off	Best Acting in a Comedy: Kate Box – Deadloch; Celeste Barber – Wellmania; Patrick Brammall – Colin From Accounts; Harriet Dyer – Colin From Accounts; Kitty Flanagan – Fisk; Nina Oyama – Deadloch; Helen Thomson – Colin From Accounts; Julia Zemiro – Fisk
Best Direction in Drama or Comedy: Emma Freeman – The Newsreader – Episode 4; Trent O'Donnell – Colin From Accounts – Episode 3; Matt Moore – Colin From Accounts – Episode 6; Ben Chessell – Deadloch – Episode 1; Glendyn Ivin – The Lost Flowers of Alice Hart – Episode 1	Best Direction in Non-Fiction Television: Rachel Perkins, Dylan River & Tov Belling – The Australian Wars – Episode 1; Henry Stone – Aaron Chen: If Weren't Filmed, Nobody Would Believe; Josh Martin – Adam and Poh's Great Australian Bites – Episode 1; Katie Bender Wynn – Matildas: The World at Our Feet – Episode 2; Stamatia Maroupas – Queerstralia – Episode 1
Best Screenplay in Television: Kate McCartney & Kate McLennan – Deadloch – Episode 1; Lucas Taylor – Black Snow – Episode 1; Harriet Dyer – Colin From Accounts – Episode 3; Patrick Brammall – Colin From Accounts – Episode 6; Adrian Russell Wills – The Newsreader – Episode 4	Best Casting: Alison Telford & Kate Leonard – Deadloch; Kirsty McGregor & Stevie Ray – Colin From Accounts; Nathan Lloyd – Safe Home; Jane Norris – The Lost Flowers of Alice Hart; Nathan Lloyd – The Newsreader
Best Cinematography in Television: Sam Chiplin – The Lost Flowers of Alice Hart – Episode 1; Aaron Farrugia – Aunty Donna's Coffee Cafe – Episode 1; Katie Milwright – Deadloch – Episode 1; Tania Lambert – Erotic Stories – Episode 2; Earle Dresner – The Newsreader – Episode 4	Best Costume Design in Television: Zed Dragojlovich – The Newsreader – Episode 4; Xanthe Heubel – Ten Pound Poms – Episode 1; Lisa Galea Gunning – The Claremont Murders – Episode 1; Erin Roche – The Clearing – Episode 1; Nina Edwards – While The Men Are Away – Episode 2
Best Editing in Television: Angie Higgins – Deadloch – Episode 1; Peter Bennett – Aunty Donna's Coffee Cafe – Episode 1; Danielle Boesenberg – Colin From Accounts – Episode 3; Deborah Peart – The Lost Flowers of Alice Hart – Episode 1; Deborah Peart & Dany Cooper – The Lost Flowers of Alice Hart – Episode 6; Angie Higgins – The Newsreader – Episode 4	Best Production Design in Television: Melinda Doring – The Lost Flowers of Alice Hart – Episode 1; Jonathon Oxlade – Beep and Mort – Episode 2; Helen O'Loan – Black Snow – Episode 1; Emma Fletcher – Deadloch – Episode 1; Simon McCutcheon – Gold Diggers – Episode 3; Paddy Reardon – The Newsreader – Episode 4
Best Original Music Score in Television: Amanda Brown – Deadloch – Episode 1; Caitlin Yeo – Bad Behaviour – Episode 1; Megan Washington & Daniel O'Brien – Fisk – Episode 4; Matteo Zingales – In Limbo – Episode 1; Amanda Brown & Damien Lane – RFDS – Episode 5	Best Sound in Television: David Lee, Robert Mackenzie, Leah Katz, James Ashton – The Lost Flowers of Alice Hart – Episode 6; Mark Cornish, Tom Heuzenroeder, Justin Spasevski, Robert Mackenzie – Black Snow – Episode 6; Grant Shepherd – Last King of the Cross – Episode 4; Roger van Wensveen, David Williams, Ralph Ortner – The Clearing – Episode 1; Nick Godkin, Ralph Ortner, Lee Yee, Liesl Pieterse – The Newsreader – Episode 6

== Documentary ==
Best Documentary: John Farnham: Finding the Voice – Poppy Stockell, Mikael Borglund, Paul Clarke, Martin Fabinyi, Olivia Hoopmann; Ego: The Michael Gudinski Story – Paul Goldman, Bethany Jones, Paige McGinley; Harley & Katya – Selina Milea, Blayke Hoffman, Jo-anne McGowan, Aaliyah-Jade Bradbury; The Dark Emu Story – Allan Clarke, Darren Dale, Belinda Mravicic, Jacob Hickey; The Giants – Laurence Billiet, Rachael Antony, Helen Panckhurst; The Last Daughter – Brenda Matthews, Nathaniel Schmidt, Simon Williams, Brendon Skinner; This Is Going to Be Big – Thomas Charles Hyland, Jim Wright, Josie Mason-Campbell; To Never Forget – Peter Hegedüs, Jaclyn McLendon, Bobbi-Lea Dionysius	Best Documentary or Factual Program: The Australian Wars – Darren Dale, Rachel Perkins, Belinda Mravicic – Blackfella Films (NITV, SBS); Matildas: The World at Our Feet – Steve Bibb – Barking Mad Productions & Station 10 Media (Disney+); Ningaloo Nyinggulu – Celia Tait, Tim Winton, Peter Rees, Karen Williams – Artemis Media (ABC); Queerstralia – Jon Casimir, Kevin Whyte, Zoë Coombs Marr, Plum Stubbings – Guesswork Television (ABC); War on Waste – Craig Reucassel, David Galloway, Leonie Lowe – Lune Media (ABC); Who Do You Think You Are? – Maxine Gray – Warner Bros. International Television Production (ABC)
Best Editing in a Documentary: Andrea Lang, Mark Atkin, Hilary Balmond – The Australian Wars; Patrick McCabe – Because We Have Each Other; Peter Crombie, Lawrie Silvestrin – Folau; Simon Njoo, Pete Ward – Harley & Katya; Aleck Morton, Lydia Springhall – Queerstralia	Best Cinematography in a Documentary: Sherwin Akbarzadeh – The Giants; Nick Robinson, Jack Riley, Ashley Gibb, Caspar Mazzotti – Australia's Wild Odyssey; Caspar Mazzotti, Cam Batten, Nick Robinson, Miles Rowland – Shackleton: The Greatest Story of Survival; Simon Morris – The Dark Emu Story; Alex Serafini – This is Going To Be Big
Best Original Music Score in a Documentary: Caitlin Yeo, Damien Lane – The Dark Emu Story; David Hirschfelder – John Farnham: Finding The Voice; Caitlin Yeo – Kindred; Brett Aplin, Burkhard Dallwitz – Splice Here: A Projected Odyssey; Mark D'Angelo – Under Cover	Best Sound in a Documentary: David Williams – Ego: The Michael Gudinski Story; Wayne Pashley – John Farnham: Finding The Voice; Damien Lane, Andrew Belletty – Kindred; Tristan Meredith – Memory Film: A Filmmaker's Diary; Eren Sener, Andrew Wright, Will Carroll, Megan Howieson – The Dark Emu Story

== Short form and online ==
Best Short Film: Finding Addison – Francisca Braithwaite, Jess Milne, Nick Bolton; An Ostrich Told Me the World Is Fake and I Think I Believe It – Lachlan Pendragon; Ashes – Georgina Haig, Dean Francis, Daisy Betts-Miller, Charmaine Kuhn; Jia – Vee Shi, Nicholson Ren, Taysha McFarland; Mud Crab – David Robinson-Smith, Adam Daniel, Adam Finney; Not Dark Yet – Bonnie Moir, Nicholas Denton, Michael Jones	Best Short Animation
Best Online Drama or Comedy: Latecomers – Liam Heyen, Hannah Ngo, Angus Thompson, Emma Myers, Nina Oyama, Madeleine Gottlieb, Alistair Baldwin; Appetite – Mohini Herse, Karen Radzyner; Me & Her(pes) – Gemma Bird Matheson, Hannah Ngo, Kasia Vickery, Vic Zerbst; Monologue – Jim Wright, Elise Trenorden, Nicholas Clifford, Nina Oyama; The Disposables – Karen Radzyner, Renny Wijeyamohan, Sonia Whiteman, Keir Wilkins; The Future of Everything – Nicholas Colla, Mike Greaney, Nicolette Minster

== Additional awards ==
Best Hair and Makeup: Rebecca Buratto, Paul Katte, Nick Nicolaou – Talk to Me; Jennifer Lamphee – Last King of The Cross; Lara Jade Birch, Georgia Lockhart-Adams – The Lost Flowers of Alice Hart; Jennifer Lamphee – The Portable Door; Sheldon Wade, Adam Johansen, Damian Martin – Wolf Like Me	Best Visual Effects or Animation: Indiana Jones and the Dial of Destiny – Andrew Whitehurst, Kathy Siegel, Alistair Williams, Julian Hutchens, Ian Cope; Ant-Man and the Wasp: Quantumania – Jesse James Chisholm, Fiona Campbell Westgate, Jamie Macdougall, Rachel Copp, Paul Corbould; I Am Groot: Season 2 – Kirsten Lepore, Brad Winderbaum, Raphael de Almeida Pimentel, Adam Goins; Scarygirl – Sophie Byrne, Tania Vincent, Ricard Cussó, Nathan Jurevicius; Wolf Like Me – Jason Hawkins, Mark Millar, Martina Joison, Flavia Riley, Matthew Chance
Audience Choice Award for Favourite Film: Barbie; Mean Girls; Saltburn; Taylor Swift: The Eras Tour; The Hunger Games: The Ballad of Songbirds & Snakes; Wonka	Audience Choice Award for Favourite Television Show: Ginny & Georgia; My Life with the Walter Boys; Outer Banks; The Kardashians; The Summer I Turned Pretty; Young Sheldon
Audience Choice Award for Favourite Actor: Adam Sandler; Chris Hemsworth; Jacob Elordi; Ryan Gosling; Timothėe Chalamet; Vin Diesel	Audience Choice Award for Favourite Actress: Margot Robbie; Jenna Ortega; Jennifer Aniston; Jennifer Lawrence; Millie Bobby Brown; Sydney Sweeney
Audience Choice Award for Favourite Australian Media Personality: Sophie Monk; Abbie Chatfield; Chloe Hayden; Em Rusciano; Jimmy Rees; Shameless Podcast	Audience Choice Award for Favourite Australian Digital Creator: Kat Clark and family; Anna Paul; Bridey Drake; Georgia Productions; Indy Clinton; Luke and Sassy Scott; Maddy MacRae; Sofia Ligeros
Audience Choice Award for Favourite Australian Sports Moment: Soccer: Matildas World Cup run; AFL: Carlton reach the finals; AFL Grand Final: Collingwood vs Brisbane; F1: Daniel Ricciardo returns to F1; Netball: Australian Diamonds win Netball World Cup; NRL Grand Final: Panthers vs Broncos

== Individual awards ==
The Trailblazer Award: Margot Robbie	The Byron Kennedy Award: Bruna Papandrea
The Brian Walsh Award: Ngali Shaw	The Reg Grundy Award: Rachel Berger – Seriously Funny
