= Made Up Stories (company) =

Film and television production company

- Type: Privately held company
- Industry: Entertainment
- Founded: 2017
- Founders: Bruna Papandrea; Jodi Matterson; Steve Hutensky
- Number of locations: 3 (Los Angeles, Sydney, London)
- Services: Film production and Television production

Made Up Stories is a film and television development and production company founded in 2017 by producer Bruna Papandrea that claims to "[champion] women on and off the screen." The company has offices in Los Angeles and Sydney.

== History ==
Made Up Stories was founded in 2017 by Bruna Papandrea, Jodi Matterson and Steve Hutensky. Matterson exited the company in April 2024, establishing her own company, Silent Firework.

In 2012, Bruna Papandrea co-founded Pacific Standard with actress Reese Witherspoon, a production company focusing on creating films made by and about women. Their first two projects at Pacific Standard were Gone Girl and Wild, both adapted from books whose rights were acquired before publication. Both films were released in 2014, receiving commercial success and extensive accolades. The company had finished production on Hot Pursuit (2015), by the time the first two pictures were released.

In 2016, Papandrea and Witherspoon announced that they were ending their partnership, though they would continue to work on the projects that were in the middle of production, including the HBO series Big Little Lies which was received 16 Primetime Emmy Award nominations and won eight, including Outstanding Limited Series.

Papandrea launched Made Up Stories in January 2017 to carry on her mission in championing female filmmakers, adapting female-written novels and creating stories featuring multi-faceted female characters. The company is also committed to inclusivity in less-acknowledged departments behind-the-scenes such as transportation teams and gaffers. Papandrea has expressed intent to start a foundation, Made Up Solutions, to provide opportunities for women from low socio-economic and diverse backgrounds.

In January 2021, the company made history: it became the first ever Australian production company to have the top two films at the Australian box office (with Penguin Bloom and The Dry).

In November 2023, founders Papandrea, Hutensky and Matterson along with Matterson's husband Michael Napthali (legal consultant to Made Up Stories), signed an online pledge on the Australian website, 'Say No to Antisemitism', that cites The Executive Council on Australian Jewry's claim that antisemitism had risen '482%'. Independent Australian media company Crikey refutes this data.

== Controversies ==
In October 2017, The New York Times journalists Jodi Kantor and Megan Twohey reported on Made Up Stories Chief Operating Officer and Producer Steve Hutensky's historical involvement in silencing victims of Harvey Weinstein during Hutensky's time as an employee of Miramax and The Weinstein Company. The article described Hutensky's role in creating two nondisclosure agreements that protected Weinstein, including one that barred the victim from disclosing Weinstein's name even to a therapist.

In December 2022, Hutensky's role was reported for the first time in the Australian Media. Hutensky was also named in an April 2022 Rolling Stones article.

Hutensky's Weinstein involvement was referenced in a scene in the 2022 feature film, She Said. The film, produced by Annapurna Pictures and Plan B Entertainment, was based on Kantor and Twohey's book of the same name and followed their investigation into Weinstein's abuse and sexual misconduct against women.

== Current projects ==
On the film side, Made Up Stories adapted The Dry based on the debut book of Australian novelist Jane Harper. The film, directed by Robert Connolly and starring Eric Bana, was released in Australia on January 1 to a strong box office, making it one of the highest grossing Australian film opening weekends ever. The film was released by IFC Films in North America on May 21, 2021. The company also produced the film Penguin Bloom, starring Naomi Watts and Andrew Lincoln, directed by Glendyn Ivin, based on the true story of the Bloom family from the book of the same name by Bradley Trevor Greive. It premiered at the 2020 Toronto International Film Festival and was released in Australia cinemas on January 21, topping the box office for its opening weekend, and in other key countries, including the United States by Netflix on January 27.

It was announced on February 22, that the company was adapting Jessica Knoll's novel Luckiest Girl Alive in partnership with Picturestart for film at Netflix. It will star Mila Kunis, and be directed by Mike Barker.

On the television side, Made Up Stories produced the recent HBO miniseries The Undoing, starring Nicole Kidman and Hugh Grant, which debuted on October 25, 2020, and became the most viewed show for the network in 2020. The company also produced the Amazon Prime Video thriller drama series Tell Me Your Secrets, released on February 19, created by Harriet Warner, and starring Lily Rabe, Amy Brenneman, Hamish Linklater, and Enrique Murciano. They also produced the new Hulu hit series, Nine Perfect Strangers, based on the book by Liane Moriarity. The series, written by David E. Kelley, stars Nicole Kidman and Melissa McCarthy, along with numerous other high-profile actors, debuted on August 18 with the premiere quickly becoming the most-watched Hulu original ever.

The company is currently in production on two Netflix series. The first project, Pieces of Her, based on the book by Karin Slaughter, features an all-female creative team including director Minkie Spiro and executive producers Lesli Linka Glatter, Charlotte Stoudt and Bruna Papandrea. The show stars Toni Collette and Bella Heathcote. The second project is the six-episode anthology series, Anatomy of a Scandal, based on the book by Sarah Vaughan, created and written by David E. Kelley and Melissa James Gibson, and directed by SJ Clarkson. The show is being produced in partnership with 3Dot Productions' Liza Chasin, and stars Sienna Miller, Michelle Dockery, Rupert Friend, and Naomi Scott.

Additionally, the company is producing Long Slow Exhale for Spectrum Originals and BET, along with showrunner Pam Veasey, director Anton Cropper, and co-executive producer John Dove. The basketball drama series stars Rose Rollins. The company also produced Roar for Apple TV+, based on the book by Cecelia Ahern and adapted as an anthology series by Glow creators Liz Flahive and Carly Mensch. Produced in partnership with Blossom Films, the series will star Nicole Kidman, Cynthia Erivo, Merritt Wever, and Alison Brie. And the company is also producing the genre-bending series Wolf Like Me for Peacock in the US and Stan in Australia. The show is created and directed by Abe Forsythe, and is starring Josh Gad and Isla Fisher. The company is also producing the seven-part dramatic series, The Lost Flowers of Alice Hart, based on Holly Ringland's debut novel, for Amazon Prime Video. The show is created and written by Sarah Lambert, directed by Glendyn Ivin, and stars Sigourney Weaver.

== Productions ==
=== Films ===
Year	Title	Director	Gross (worldwide)	Notes
2018	The Nightingale	Jennifer Kent	$988,687	Premiered in competition at the 75th Venice International Film Festival, winning two awards Swept the 9th AACTA Awards including winning Best Film and Best Director Distributed in the United States by IFC Films
2019	Little Monsters	Abe Forsythe	N/A - US box office not reported	Premiered at the Sundance Film Festival Released in the United States by NEON and Hulu
2020	The Dry	Robert Connolly	$17,051,620 (AUS & NZ only)	Released in Australia by Roadshow on January 1, 2021 Releasing in N. America by IFC Films on May 21, 2021
2020	Penguin Bloom	Glendyn Ivin	$6,039,513 (AUS, NZ, Russia/CIS only)	Premiered at the 2020 Toronto International Film Festival Released in cinemas in Australia by Roadshow on January 21, 2021 Released in N. America, U.K., France and select Asian countries by Netflix on Jan. 27, 2021
2022	Luckiest Girl Alive	Mike Barker	n/a	Released by Netflix on Oct. 7, 2022
2024	Force of Nature: The Dry 2	Robert Connolly		To be released in Australia by Roadshow on February 8, 2024
TBA	Ashley's War	—N/a	—N/a	Distributed by Universal Pictures; co-production with Hello Sunshine

=== Television series ===
Year	Title	Network	Notes
2018	Queen America	Facebook Watch	Created by Meagan Oppenheimer
2020	The Undoing	HBO	Created by David E. Kelley, based on a Jean Hanff Korelitz book Nominated for the Critics' Choice Television Awards for Best Limited Series Nominated for 4 Golden Globe Awards including Best Limited Series or Television Film
2021	Tell Me Your Secrets	Amazon Prime Video	Created by Harriet Warner
2021–present	Nine Perfect Strangers	Hulu, Prime Video	Created by David E. Kelley, based on the Liane Moriarty book
2022	Anatomy of a Scandal	Netflix	Created by David E. Kelley and Melissa James Gibson, based on the Sarah Vaughan book
2022	Pieces of Her	Netflix	Created by Charlotte Stoudt, based on the Karin Slaughter book
2022	Long Slow Exhale	Spectrum Originals/BET	Created by Pam Veasey
2022	Roar	Apple TV+	Created by Liz Flahive & Carly Mensch, based on the short story collection by Cecelia Ahern
2022	Wolf Like Me	Peacock, Stan	Created by Abe Forsythe
2023	The Lost Flowers of Alice Hart	Amazon Prime Video	Created by Sarah Lambert, based on the Holly Ringland novel
2024	The Last Anniversary	Binge	Created by Samantha Strauss, based on the Liane Moriarty novel

== Projects in Development ==
- Film adaptation of the thriller novel As Long As We Both Shall Live by JoAnn Chaney
- Adaptation of the historical epic The Lost Queen by Signe Pike for television
- TV series based on the Jessica Knoll novel The Favorite Sister
- A limited TV series on Tina Brown based on her book The Vanity Fair Diaries
- Film adaptations of the YA fantasy books Stepsister and Poisoned by Jennifer Donnelly with Lynette Howell Taylor's 51 Entertainment
- The multi-generational novel The Last Anniversary by Liane Moriarty
- TV adaption of Christina Baker Kline's new book The Exiles
- TV show based on Greer Macallister's historical thriller Woman 99 with Nina Dobrev
- TV adaption of Marie Lu's Warcross with John Cameron
- TV adaption of Christopher Paolini's first adult novel, the sci-fi space opera To Sleep in a Sea of Stars with Snoot Entertainment
- TV adaption of Elizabeth Acevedo's dual-narrative YA novel, Clap When You Land
- Film adaptation of Gordon Reece's debut novel, Mice, in partnership with Nicole Kidman's Blossom Films
- Film adaptation of Erin French's memoir, Finding Freedom: A Cook's Story; Remaking Life From Scratch
- TV adaption of Kirsten Miller's upcoming novel, The Change, in partnership with Raelle Tucker
