= Bruna Papandrea =

Australian film and television producer

Bruna Papandrea AM
- Born: Adelaide, South Australia, Australia
- Occupation: Film producer
- Years active: 1997 – present
- Works: Wild; Big Little Lies; Gone Girl
- Spouse: Steve Hutensky
- Children: 2

Bruna Papandrea AM is an Australian film and television producer and the founder of production company Made Up Stories. Prior to Made Up Stories, Papandrea co-founded the production company Pacific Standard with Reese Witherspoon.

== Early life and education ==
Papandrea was raised in Adelaide, South Australia, by a single mother.

== Career ==
Papandrea moved to New York City in the 1990s after establishing a career in film production. She briefly returned to Australia to produce the 2000 film Better Than Sex, which was nominated for the AFI Award for Best Film, before moving to London in 2001. She served as a production executive at the film studio Mirage Enterprises and later returned to New York to work for GreeneStreet Films, a production company for independent films, as a creative director. At GreeneStreet she executive produced the 2006 romantic comedy Wedding Daze before joining another independent production company, Groundswell Productions, in Los Angeles in February 2006. There she was responsible for producing Smart People (2008), Milk (2008), The Marc Pease Experience (2009), and All Good Things (2010).

In 2011, Papandrea produced Warm Bodies, a zombie comedy film directed by Jonathan Levine and released in 2013.

In 2012, she and actress Reese Witherspoon co-founded Pacific Standard, a Beverly Hills-based production company focusing on creating films made by and about women. Their first two projects at Pacific Standard were Gone Girl and Wild, both adapted from books whose rights were acquired by Papandrea and Witherspoon before publication. Both films were released in 2014, by which time they had also completed production on the 2015 comedy film Hot Pursuit. In 2016, they announced that they were ending their partnership, though they would continue to work on the projects that were in the middle of production, including the HBO series Big Little Lies and a film adaptation of the novel Luckiest Girl Alive.

Papandrea launched her production company, Made Up Stories, in January 2017 to carry on her mission in championing female filmmakers, adapting female-written novels and creating stories featuring multi-faceted female characters. The company is also committed to inclusivity in behind-the-scenes departments such as transportation teams and gaffers.

== Other activities ==
In April 2020, Papandrea and Gregg Fienberg founded the "It Takes Our Village" initiative, along with numerous A-list Hollywood producers to help raise money for below-the-line crews affected by the COVID-19 pandemic. Papandrea credited "below-the-line crews" as "the backbone of our industry".

On 12 October 2023 an open letter was published by Creative Community for Peace, whose mission statement "to galvanize support against the cultural boycott of Israel". Papandrea joined the petition, along with around "2000 leaders from the entertainment industry" in support of Israel. On 23 October 2023 Papadrea signed a second petition, "NoHostageLeftBehind", which consisted of several hundred Hollywood figures petitioning US President Joe Biden to secure the release of more Israeli hostages.

== Recognition ==
2015: Papandrea received the Australians in Film International Award.

2018: Papandrea was honored by G'Day USA, receiving Outstanding Achievement in Film & TV Award.

2020: Papandrea won the Don Dunstan Award, and appeared "In Conversation" with one of the patrons of the Adelaide Film Festival, Margaret Pomeranz AM in mid-October during the 2020 event.

2020: Papandrea was named to Variety's L.A. Women's Impact Report 2020.

2020: Papandrea was named as one of 40 Australians who mattered in Film & TV for 2020 by The Age's Good Weekend.

2021: Papandrea received the Australian Women's Film Festival (AWFF) Groundbreaker Award.

2021: Papandrea was included in The Hollywood Reporter's 2021 Women In Entertainment Power 100

2021: Papandrea was included in Deadline's DISRUPTORS 2021 class

2023: Papandrea was appointed a Member of the Order of Australia in the 2023 Australia Day Honours.

2024: Received the Australian Academy of Cinema and Television Arts (AACTA), Byron Kennedy Award.

== Awards and nominations ==
2000: Nominated for the Australia Film Institute (AFI) Award Best Film for Better Than Sex

2017: Winner of the Primetime Emmy for Outstanding Limited Series for Big Little Lies

2018: Winner of the Golden Globe for Best Television Series or Motion Picture Made for Television for Big Little Lies (season 1)

2018: Nominated for the BAFTA TV Award for Best International for Big Little Lies

2018: Nominated for the PGA Award for Outstanding Producer of Episode Television, Drama for Big Little Lies (season 1)

2019: Winner of the AACTA Award for Best Film for The Nightingale

2020: Winner of the Film Critics Circle of Australia Awards for Best Film for The Nightingale

2020: Nominated for the PGA Award for Outstanding Producer of Episode Television, Drama for Big Little Lies (season 2)

2020: Nominated for the Golden Globe for Best Television Series, Drama for Big Little Lies (season 2)

2021: Nominated for the Critics' Choice Television Awards for Best Limited Series for The Undoing

2021: Nominated for the Golden Globe for Best Limited Series or Television Film for The Undoing

2021: Nominated for the PGA Award's David L. Wolper Award for Outstanding Producer of Limited Series Television for The Undoing

== Personal life ==
Papandrea is married to producer Steve Hutensky and gave birth to twins in 2012. She has systemic lupus erythematosus (lupus), diagnosed in August 2010, which causes her chronic joint pain.

== Filmography ==
Before she started her own production companies, Papandrea produced various films with other companies, including:

- Better Than Sex (2000)
- Wedding Daze (2006)
- Milk (2008)
- Smart People (2008)
- The Marc Pease Experience (2009)
- All Good Things (2010)
- Not Suitable for Children (2012)

=== Films ===
Year	Title	Director	Gross (worldwide)	Notes
2013	Warm Bodies	Jonathan Levine	$117 million	A Summit Entertainment film
2014	Wild	Jean-Marc Vallée	$52.5 million	Produced as Pacific Standard Nominated for two Academy Awards
2014	Gone Girl	David Fincher	$369.3 million	Produced as Pacific Standard Nominated for one Academy Award
2015	Hot Pursuit	Anne Fletcher	$51.7 million	Produced as Pacific Standard
2019	Lucy in the Sky	Noah Hawley	n/a	Produced by Bruna Papandrea Premiered at the Toronto International Film Festival
2018	The Nightingale	Jennifer Kent	n/a	Premiered in competition at the 75th Venice International Film Festival, winning two awards Swept the 9th AACTA Awards including winning Best Film and Best Director Distributed in the United States by IFC Films
2019	Little Monsters	Abe Forsythe	n/a	Premiered at the Sundance Film Festival Released in the United States by NEON and Hulu
2020	Penguin Bloom	Glendyn Ivin	$6 million (AUS & NZ only)	Premiered at the 2020 Toronto International Film Festival Released in Australia by Roadshow on January 21, 2021, Releasing in North America, U.K., France and select countries in Asia by Netflix on Jan. 27, 2021
2021	The Dry	Robert Connolly	$17 million (AUS & NZ only)	Released in Australia by Roadshow on January 1, 2021, Releasing in N. America by IFC Films on May 21, 2021
2022	Luckiest Girl Alive	Mike Barker	n/a	Will be released by Netflix
2024	Force of Nature: The Dry 2	Robert Connolly		To be released in Australia by Roadshow on February 8, 2024
TBA	Ashley's War	—N/a	—N/a	Distributed by Universal Pictures; co-production with Hello Sunshine

=== Television series ===
Year	Title	Network	Notes
2017-2019	Big Little Lies	HBO	Produced as Pacific Standard (S1) and Bruna Papandrea (S2) Created by David E. Kelley, based on the Liane Moriarty book S1 nominated for 16 Emmy Awards, winning eight including Outstanding Limited Series
2018	Queen America	Facebook Watch	Created by Meagan Oppenheimer
2020	The Undoing	HBO	Created by David E. Kelley, based on a Jean Hanff Korelitz book Nominated for the Critics' Choice Television Awards for Best Limited Series Nominated for 4 Golden Globe Awards including Best Limited Series or Television Film
2021	Tell Me Your Secrets	Amazon Prime Video	Created by Harriet Warner
2021	Pieces of Her	Netflix	Created by Charlotte Stoudt, based on the Karin Slaughter book
2021	Nine Perfect Strangers	Hulu	Created by David E. Kelley, based on the Liane Moriarty book
2022	Anatomy Of A Scandal	Netflix	Created by David E. Kelley and Melissa James Gibson, based on the Sarah Vaughan book
2022	Long Slow Exhale	Spectrum Originals/BET	Created by Pam Veasey
2022	Roar	Apple TV+	Created by Liz Flahive and Carly Mensch, based on the short story collection by Cecelia Ahern
2022	Wolf Like Me	Peacock, Stan	Created by Abe Forsythe
2023	The Lost Flowers of Alice Hart	Amazon Prime Video	Created by Sarah Lambert, based on the Holly Ringland novel
2024	The Last Anniversary	Binge	Created by Samantha Strauss, based on the Liane Moriarty novel

=== Projects in development ===
- Film adaptation of the thriller novel As Long As We Both Shall Live by JoAnn Chaney
- Television adaptation of The Lost Flowers of Alice Hart based on the debut novel from Australian writer Holly Ringland
- Adaptation of the historical epic The Lost Queen by Signe Pike for television
- TV series based on the Jessica Knoll novel The Favorite Sister
- A limited TV series on Tina Brown based on her book The Vanity Fair Diaries
- Film adaptations of the YA fantasy books Stepsister and Poisoned by Jennifer Donnelly with Lynette Howell Taylor's 51 Entertainment
- The multi-generational novel The Last Anniversary by Liane Moriarty
- TV adaptation of Christina Baker Kline's new book The Exiles
- TV show based on Greer Macallister's historical thriller Woman 99 with Nina Dobrev
- TV adaptation of Marie Lu's Warcross with John Cameron
- Feature film adaptation of Christopher Paolini's first adult novel, the sci-fi space opera To Sleep in a Sea of Stars with Snoot Entertainment
- Universal's film adaptation of Gayle Tzemach Lemmon's novel, Ashley's War: The Untold Story of a Team of Women Soldiers on the Special Ops Battlefield
- TV adaptation of Elizabeth Acevedo's dual-narrative YA Novel, Clap When You Land
- Film adaptation of Gordon Reece's debut novel, Mice, in partnership with Nicole Kidman's Blossom Films
- Film adaptation of Erin French's memoir, Finding Freedom: A Cook's Story; Remaking Life From Scratch
- TV adaptation of Kirsten Miller's upcoming novel, The Change, in partnership with Raelle Tucker
