= Doctors and Nurses =

Doctors and Nurses may refer to a children's game of imaginative role-playing where medical profession roles are adopted and acted out.

It may also refer to:

- Doctors and Nurses (TV series), a British television sitcom
- Doctors and Nurses (film), a 1981 Australian comedy film
- "Doctors & Nurses" (Cardiac Arrest), a 1994 television episode
