= Little Monsters (2019 film) =

2019 comedy film by Abe Forsythe

- Theatrical release poster
- Directed by: Abe Forsythe
- Written by: Abe Forsythe
- Produced by: Jodi Matterson; Bruna Papandrea; Steve Hutensky; Keith Calder; Jessica Calder
- Starring: Lupita Nyong'o; Alexander England; Josh Gad; Kat Stewart
- Cinematography: Lachlan Milne
- Edited by: Drew Thompson; Jim May
- Music by: Piers Burbrook de Vere
- Production companies: Screen Australia; Protagonist Pictures; Made Up Stories; Snoot Entertainment
- Distributed by: Neon; Hulu; (United States); Altitude; (United Kingdom); Universal Pictures; (Australia)
- Release dates: January 27, 2019 (Sundance); October 8, 2019 (United States); October 31, 2019 (Australia); November 15, 2019 (United Kingdom)
- Running time: 94 minutes
- Countries: Australia; United States; United Kingdom
- Language: English

Little Monsters is a 2019 zombie comedy film written and directed by Abe Forsythe, starring Lupita Nyong'o, Alexander England, Josh Gad, and Kat Stewart. The story centres on a washed-up musician, a children's television personality and a kindergarten teacher teaming up to protect a group of young schoolchildren during a sudden zombie outbreak.

The film had its world premiere at the Sundance Film Festival on January 27, 2019, and was released in the United States on October 8, 2019, by Neon, in a limited release followed by digital streaming on October 11, 2019, by Hulu. It was released in Australia on October 31, 2019, by Universal Pictures and in the United Kingdom on November 15, 2019, by Altitude. It received generally positive reviews from critics, with many praising the performances of the cast.

== Plot ==
Set in Australia, Dave is a dirty-talking, washed-up musician who goes through a rough break up with his girlfriend Sara and is forced to stay with his sister, Tess, and her son, Felix, a child with a fascination for tractors, space blasters, and Darth Vader. While dropping Felix off at school, Dave meets Miss Audrey Caroline, Felix's kindergarten teacher, and is attracted to her. After a parent drops out from an upcoming field trip to a farm, Dave volunteers to chaperone, to be near Audrey.

On the day of the field trip, Dave is upset to learn that beloved children's television personality Teddy McGiggle is filming his show there and that Audrey is engaged to someone else. Meanwhile, zombies break out of a U.S. testing facility and head straight for the neighboring farm where they attack the class, who try to escape, only to realize the farm is overrun.

The survivors try to seek shelter in the gift shop, only to find that Teddy has locked himself inside and refuses to let them in. Audrey and the children crawl into an opening next to the shop. Dave breaks in from the roof, beats up Teddy, and unlocks the door so Audrey and the children can come in. Felix then has an allergic reaction after Dave accidentally feeds him chips with dairy in them. After a botched attempt to give Felix epinephrine, Audrey rushes to get some from Felix's backpack, which was left in the tractor. Teddy tries to signal a military helicopter, but falls off the roof and is rescued by Dave, to whom Teddy reveals that his real name is Nathan Schneider and that he is an alcoholic sex addict who hates children and sleeps with their mothers to escape his depression.

That night, while Teddy and the children are asleep, Dave tells Audrey about how his father left him when he was young and that only his sister was there for him. Audrey reveals that she is no longer engaged, as her fiancé had cheated on her with a co-worker (only wearing the ring to keep her pupils' fathers away), and that she got into teaching after following Hanson on tour.

The next day, the children wake up and begin complaining, so David sings Neil Diamond's "Sweet Caroline", getting the children involved when he changes the chorus to Miss Caroline. Meanwhile, the military plans to bomb the gift shop the children are in to destroy the zombies and prevent an outbreak. The survivors decide to get a large vehicle and drive to safety. Teddy and Dave attempt to get Teddy's McGiggle Mobile, but Teddy betrays Dave, and is then killed by the zombified crew member who plays his sidekick Frogsie. Dave is forced to climb on top of the van to avoid being eaten, where he is able to get phone reception and thank Tess for supporting him. When all seems lost, Felix arrives driving a tractor and saves Dave, and together they rescue Audrey and the children. As they drive to safety, they discover that the zombies respond to the music Audrey plays. They eventually reach the military and escape just as the farm is bombed. The zombies following them are gunned down by the army.

Dave and Audrey share a kiss before they and the kids are taken away and placed in quarantine for 48 hours in case of infection. The final scene shows Dave, Audrey, and the kids singing Taylor Swift's "Shake It Off", which Dave previously hated, as the kids' parents watch on with tears of joy in their eyes.

== Cast ==
- Lupita Nyong'o as Miss Audrey Caroline
- Alexander England as David "Dave" Anderson
- Kat Stewart as Tess
- Diesel La Torraca as Felix
- Josh Gad as Teddy McGiggle / Nathan Schneider
- Nadia Townsend as Sara
- Marshall Napier as Army General
- Ava Caryofyllis as Beth
- Charlie Whitley as Max
- Kim Thien Doan as Kim
- Mason Mansour as Mickey
- Caliah Pinones as Caliah
- Ashton Arokiaswamy as Ashton
- Shia Hamby as Shia
- Wolfgang Gledhill as Wolfgang
- Vivienne Albany as Vivienne
- Rahel Romahn as Griffin
- Shalamah Tautaiolefue as Zombie
- Jack LaTorre as Jack
- Glenn Hazeldine as Rory
- Jason Chong as Lieutenant
- Stephen Peacocke as Stevens
- Felix Williamson as Novak
- Josh Quong Tart as Echidna Man
- Henry Nixon and Zindzi Okenyo as Security Guards

== Production ==
In October 2017, it was announced Lupita Nyong'o and Josh Gad had joined the cast of the film, with Abe Forsythe directing from a screenplay he wrote. Keith Calder, Jess Calder, Bruna Papandrea will serve as producers on the film, under their Snoot Entertainment and Made Up Stories banners, respectively. The film was financed and produced by Screen Australia, and shot in Sydney.

== Release ==
The film had its world premiere at the Sundance Film Festival on 27 January 2019. Shortly after, Neon and Hulu acquired distribution rights to the film. Little Monsters was released in the United States in a limited release on October 8, 2019, followed by digital streaming on Hulu on October 11, 2019. The film had a limited release in Australia on 31 October 2019 by Universal Pictures Australia, followed by a digital release on various platforms three weeks later. It was released in the United Kingdom on 15 November 2019.

== Reception ==
On Rotten Tomatoes the film has an approval rating of 79% based on 131 reviews, with an average score of 6.8/10. The website's critical consensus reads, "Led by typically outstanding work from Lupita Nyong'o, Little Monsters is a horror/rom-com hybrid that proves the zombie genre still has fresh brains to savor." On Metacritic, the film has a score of 59 out of 100, based on 19 critics, indicating "mixed or average" reviews.
