= The Last Anniversary =

Australian television drama series

- Created by: Samantha Strauss
- Based on: The Last Anniversary by Liane Moriarty
- Written by: Samantha Strauss; Sarah L. Walker; Giula Sandler; Greg Waters
- Directed by: John Polson
- Starring: Teresa Palmer; Miranda Richardson; Danielle Macdonald; Helen Thomson
- Theme music composer: Agnes Obel
- Opening theme: "Riverside" by Agnes Obel
- Composer: Dickon Hinchliffe
- Country of origin: Australia
- Original language: English
- No. of episodes: 6

Production
- Executive producers: Lana Greenhalgh; Alison Hubert-Burns; Steve Hutensky; Nicole Kidman; Jodi Matterson; Liane Moriarty; Bruna Papandrea; John Polson; Per Saari; Samantha Strauss
- Producer: Lorelle Adamson
- Production location: New South Wales
- Cinematography: Rob Marsh
- Editor: Dany Cooper
- Production companies: Aussie Aus; Blossom Films; Fifth Season; Foxtel Productions; Made Up Stories

Original release
- Network: Binge
- Release: 27 March – 1 May 2025

The Last Anniversary is an Australian television series. It is directed by John Polson and is an adaptation by Samantha Strauss of the Liane Moriarty novel of the same name. It is executive produced by Nicole Kidman amongst other producers. It stars Teresa Palmer, Miranda Richardson and Danielle Macdonald.

== Premise ==
Sophie Honeywell (Palmer) inherits a house on Scribbly Gum Island from her ex-boyfriend's great-aunt Connie. However the island has many secrets.

== Cast and characters ==
- Teresa Palmer as Sophie Honeywell
- Miranda Richardson as Rose
  - Josephine Blazier as young Rose
- Danielle Macdonald as Veronika
- Helen Thomson as Enigma
- Susan Prior as Margie
- Claude Scott-Mitchell as Grace
- Charlie Garber as Thomas
- Uli Latukefu as Callum
- Jeremy Lindsay Taylor as Ron
- Angela Punch McGregor as Connie
  - Elizabeth Cullen as young Connie
- Xavier Samuel as Zeke
- Leon Ford as Elvis
- Ines English as Alice

== Episodes ==
No.	Title	Directed by	Written by	Original release date
1	"Episode 1"	John Polson	Samantha Strauss	March 27, 2025
2	"Episode 2"	John Polson	Samantha Strauss	April 3, 2025
3	"Episode 3"	John Polson	Samantha Strauss & Sarah L. Walker	April 10, 2025
4	"Episode 4"	John Polson	Giula Sandler	April 17, 2025
5	"Episode 5"	John Polson	Greg Waters	April 24, 2025
6	"Episode 6"	John Polson	Samantha Strauss & Sarah L. Walker	May 1, 2025

== Production ==
=== Development ===
Nicole Kidman and production partner Per Saari first discussed adapting the Liane Moriarty novel in 2019, but it only entered production in 2023. Kidman's Blossom Films produced the series with Bruna Papandrea’s Made Up Stories, and Fifth Season co-produced the project. The project was overseen by Brian Walsh of Foxtel prior to his death in 2023.

Bruna Papandrea, Jodi Matterson, and Steve Hutensky of Made Up Stories, along with Per Saari and Nicole Kidman of Blossom Films, Binge’s Alison Hurbert-Burns and Lana Greenhalgh, and John Polson, Liane Moriarty, and Samantha Strauss served as executive producers. The New South Wales government provided support for the production through the Made in NSW Fund. John Polson was confirmed as the director of the series.

=== Casting ===
In November 2023, it was announced that lead roles in the series would be played by Miranda Richardson, Teresa Palmer and Danielle Macdonald. Also in the cast were Helen Thomson, Susan Prior, Claude Scott-Mitchell, Charlie Garber, Uli Latukefu and Jeremy Lindsay Taylor.

=== Filming ===
Moriarty insisted that the novel be filmed in Australia, because according to producer Jodi Matterson the location where the book is set, on the Hawkesbury River in New South Wales, Moriarty considered to be a real character within the story. Filming began in Sydney in November 2023.

== Release ==
The miniseries released a first-look trailer for the show during the 2025 AACTA Awards on February 7, 2025. It was shown in Australia on March 27, 2025, on Binge, with a new episode released weekly. In October 2024, UK television rights were obtained by the BBC for iPlayer while AMC was responsible for the U.S. distribution via its Sundance Now streamer. The miniseries was premiered in the U.S. on Sunday, March 30, 2025, on AMC+, with new episodes dropping weekly on Sundays.

== Reception ==
=== Critical response ===
The review aggregator website Rotten Tomatoes reported a 78% approval rating with an average rating, based on 9 critic reviews. Metacritic, which uses a weighted average, assigned a score of 62 out of 100 based on 5 critics, indicating "generally favorable reviews".
