= Last Ride (2009 film) =

- Theatrical release poster
- Directed by: Glendyn Ivin
- Screenplay by: Mac Gudgeon
- Based on: Last Ride by Denise Young
- Produced by: Antonia Barnard; Nicholas Cole; Anthony Maras
- Starring: Hugo Weaving; Tom Russell
- Cinematography: Greig Fraser
- Edited by: Jack Hutchings
- Music by: Paul Charlier
- Distributed by: Madman Entertainment
- Release date: 2 July 2009
- Running time: 101 minutes
- Country: Australia
- Language: English
- Budget: $3,000,000
- Box office: A$388,722 (Australia)

Last Ride is a 2009 Australian drama film directed by Glendyn Ivin. It is based on the novel of the same name by Denise Young. The film follows a young boy (Tom Russell) accompanying his father (Hugo Weaving), who is wanted by the police, across Australia.

The film was given a limited release across Australia on 2 July 2009, and in the United States on 29 June 2012.

== Plot ==
Kev and his young son Chook are going by car and foot across the Australian outback, stealing cars, robbing for cash, shoplifting for food and beer, and sleeping each different night either with friends, in the outback, or where they can break it.

Chook has the memory of Max sleeping next to him in bed, Kev discovering this and viciously beating Max, and them leaving to be on the run. Kev often reassures Chook that Max is okay, as he was breathing when they left. Chook tells Kev that he didn't need to hit Max, because Max didn't hurt him, Max was just lonely. But Kev calls Chook a "little poofdah," and reveals that Max is dead. He drags him out of the car and leaves him stranded in the middle of the lake/flats. He returns in the car later, but Chook refuses a ride and walks the rest of the lake/flats.

Using a stolen cell phone, Chook secretly texts someone a photo of where they are hiding out. When they hear sirens coming, Chook admits to Kev that he was the reason, and Kev eventually tells Chook it's okay, takes the rifle and tells Chook to tell the police to take him to his ex-girlfriend's. As Chook walks towards the arriving police cars, he hears a rifle shot and turns around to see Kev lying on the ground.

== Cast ==
- Hugo Weaving as Kev
- Tom Russell as Chook
- Kelton Pell as Lyle
- Anita Hegh as Maryanne
- John Brumpton as Max

== Reception ==
The film received universal acclaim from film critics. It holds a 93% approval rating on review aggregator Rotten Tomatoes, based on 29 reviews. Last Ride received four and a half stars from Margaret Pomeranz and David Stratton respectively on At The Movies. Roger Ebert also gave it the maximum four stars. He later went on to name it as one of the best films of 2012.

== Music for end credits ==
- 'Home' by The Burning Leaves

== See also ==
- Cinema of Australia
