= Waterfront (miniseries) =

- Genre: miniseries
- Written by: Mac Gudgeon
- Directed by: Chris Thomson
- Starring: Jack Thompson; Greta Scacchi; Mark Little; Wynn Roberts
- Composer: George Dreyfus
- Country of origin: Australia
- Original language: English
- No. of episodes: 3

Production
- Producer: Bob Weis
- Running time: 3 x 2 hours

Original release
- Network: Network Ten
- Release: 20 March – 22 March 1984

Waterfront is a 1984 Australian miniseries about industrial disputes on the Australian waterfront during the Great Depression.

== Premise ==
In 1928, industrial unrest erupts on the Melbourne waterfront.

== Cast ==
- Jack Thompson as Maxey Woodbury
- Greta Scacchi as Anna Chieri
- Warren Mitchell as Laughing Les
- Noni Hazlehurst as Maggie
- Ray Barrett as Sam Elliott
- Chris Haywood as Ernie Donaldson
- Jay Mannering as Savo
- Elin Jenkins as Vera Donaldson
- Frank Gallacher as Paddy Ryan
- Jan Friedl as Sheila Ryan
- Mark Little as Allan Williams
- Wynn Roberts as Inspector Legge
- Tony Rickards as Snowy Williams
- Eileen Chapman as Florence "Flo" Williams
- Edward Hepple as Harry Geahry
- Sylvie Fonti as Teresa Callini
- Peter Sardi as Paolo Callini
- Steve Bastoni as Emilio Callini
- Joseph Spano as Giorgio
- Simon Chilvers as Cross
- David Cameron as Albert Maple-Brown
- Bruce Myles as Premier Hogan
- John Lee as The Governor
- Anthony Hawkins as Sir William McPherson
- Kirk Alexander as Commissioner Blamey
- Robert Meldrum as Parsons
- Wilfred Last as Purcell

== Production ==
The production was originally envisioned as a feature film. It was based on a script by Mac Gudgeon, who worked on the docks in the 1960s when he was avoiding the draft for the Vietnam War. He heard stories about the 1928 strike and became fascinated by it. Gudgeon wrote the script in six weeks and showed it to Bob Weis, who was producing Women of the Sun, a mini series on which Gudeon was unit manager. Weis liked it but wanted to do it as a mini series. Gudgeon spent the next 18 months rewriting.

Weis hired Chris Thompson to direct on the basis of 1915. It was the first Australian television Jack Thompson had appeared in except for Spyforce as "I fell in love with the Waterfront script." Greta Scacchi agreed to play the female lead after her breakthrough role in Heat and Dust.

Filming started in February 1983 and took place in Melbourne over 14 weeks with a budget of $2.5 million. The mini-series sold to Channel Ten.

== Reception ==
The Sydney Sun Herald called it "stunning. It will make you cry, it will make you laugh, and it will make you weep with anger. It is superbly made." The Age called it "gritty, gutsy drama... a rattling good yarn... not to be missed."

The mini-series was popular, with a market share of 30 in Sydney and Melbourne.
