= The Beautiful Lie (TV series) =

Australian drama television series

- Genre: Drama
- Written by: Alice Bell; Jonathan Gavin; Blake Ayshford
- Directed by: Glendyn Ivin; Peter Salmon
- Country of origin: Australia
- Original language: English
- No. of seasons: 1
- No. of episodes: 6

Production
- Producers: John Edwards; Imogen Banks
- Running time: 60 minutes
- Production company: Endemol Australia

Original release
- Network: ABC
- Release: 18 October – 22 November 2015

The Beautiful Lie is an Australian television drama that aired on ABC. The six-part series is a contemporary re-imagining of Leo Tolstoy's classic 1877 novel Anna Karenina. It is directed by Glendyn Ivin and Peter Salmon and produced by Endemol Australia's John Edwards and Imogen Banks. It premiered on Sunday 18 October 2015 at 8:30pm. Screenwriter Alice Bell made the decision to turn Anna and Xander into sports stars to heighten the transgression of a wife leaving her husband.

== Cast ==
=== Main / regular ===
- Sarah Snook as Anna Ivin
- Rodger Corser as Xander Ivin
- Sophie Lowe as Kitty Ballantyne
- Celia Pacquola as Dolly Faraday
- Daniel Henshall as Kingsley Faraday
- Benedict Samuel as Skeet Du Pont
- Catherine McClements as Tess Du Pont
- Alexander England as Peter Levin
- Dan Wyllie as Nick Levin
- Robert Menzies as Phillip Ballantyne
- Gina Riley as Catherine Ballantyne

=== Supporting ===
- Georgina Naidu as Joni
- Marlon Williams as Dylan
- Lewis Fletcher as Kasper Ivin
- Sue Jones as Mira

== Episodes ==
No.	Title	Directed by	Written by	Running time	Original release date	US viewers (millions)
1	"Episode 1"	Glendyn Ivin	Alice Bell	55 mins	18 October 2015	0.54
2	"Episode 2"	Glendyn Ivin	Alice Bell	54 mins	25 October 2015	0.435
3	"Episode 3"	Glendyn Ivin	Jonathan Gavin	58 mins	1 November 2015	0.381
4	"Episode 4"	Peter Salmon	Alice Bell	57 mins	8 November 2015	0.433
5	"Episode 5"	Peter Salmon	Jonathan Gavin	58 mins	15 November 2015	0.414
6	"Episode 6"	Peter Salmon	Alice Bell	56 mins	22 November 2015	0.425

== Reception ==
Melinda Houston found that the changes in society since Anna Karenina made Anna's decision to cheat on her husband seem immature rather than tragic. Michael Idato regards The Beautiful Lie as being superbly cast.
