= Tell Me Your Secrets =

American thriller drama television series

- Genre: Thriller; Drama
- Created by: Harriet Warner
- Written by: Harriet Warner
- Directed by: John Polson
- Starring: Lily Rabe; Amy Brenneman; Hamish Linklater; Enrique Murciano
- Country of origin: United States
- Original language: English
- No. of seasons: 1
- No. of episodes: 10

Production
- Executive producers: Harriet Warner; Bruna Papandrea; Casey Haver; John Polson
- Production companies: To Be Continued; Made Up Stories; Studio T

Original release
- Network: Amazon Prime Video
- Release: February 19, 2021

Tell Me Your Secrets is an American thriller drama television series created by Harriet Warner that premiered on Amazon Prime Video on February 19, 2021. The series was also written by Warner, who executive produced alongside Bruna Papandrea and Casey Haver.

== Premise ==
Tell Me Your Secrets follows "a trio of characters, each with a mysterious and troubling past: Emma (formerly known as Karen Miller) is a woman who once looked into the eyes of a dangerous killer; John is a former serial rapist desperate to find redemption; and Mary is a grieving mother obsessed with finding her missing daughter. As each of them is pushed to the edge, the truth about their pasts and motives grows ever murkier, blurring the lines between victim and perpetrator."

== Cast and characters ==
=== Starring ===
- Lily Rabe as Emma Hall
- Amy Brenneman as Mary Barlow
- Hamish Linklater as John Tyler
- Enrique Murciano as Peter Guillory

=== Main ===
- Chiara Aurelia as Rose Lord
- Ashley Madekwe as Lisa Guillory
- Bryant Tardy as Jay Abellard
- Elliot Fletcher as Jake Barlow
- Xavier Samuel as Kit Parker
- Stella Baker as Theresa Barlow

=== Recurring ===
- Marque Richardson as Tom Johnston
- Katherine Willis as Diana Lord
- Richard Thomas as Bodie Lord
- E'myri Crutchfield as Jess Cairns
- Charles Esten as Saul Barlow
- Chase Stokes as Adam

== Episodes ==
| No. | Title | Directed by | Written by | Original release date |
|---|---|---|---|---|
| 1 | "Once I Had Love" | Houda Benyamina | Harriet Warner | February 19, 2021 |
Emma Hall, the former girlfriend of a serial killer named Parker, is released from jail after covering for him and placed into witness protection in Saint James, Louisiana. Mary Barlow's daughter, Theresa, was believed to have been kidnapped and murdered by Parker, but her body was never found, leaving Mary to believe she is still alive. Her search has strained her marriage. Emma struggles to fit in and move on from her past and befriends Jess, a local teen from a group home. Mary is set to meet Parker after seven years of requests, but right before meeting her he commits suicide in his cell. Having lost her only source to find Theresa, she remembers his girlfriend, Emma, and tasks John, a convicted rapist who is looking for redemption, to find her. Emma finds her new friend murdered and barely escapes with her life. A flashback reveals Emma had met Theresa, even though she told Mary she did not know her.
| 2 | "Burn Me When I'm Gone" | John Polson | Harriet Warner and Linda McGibney | February 19, 2021 |
Emma tells Pete about Jess' murder, but her body is gone. Peter tells her she must be imagining it, a side effect of the medications she is taking. John learns, after locating Emma's mother, that she was in a group home and is ordered by Mary to travel to Minnesota to find where she ended up. Mary holds a vigil for Theresa to spread awareness of the missing girls and hopes she will find other parents who never found a body. Peter struggles to be a good husband to his wife, Lisa. Emma grows closer to a local rich girl, Rose, who has an abusive mother. Mary is shown sleeping with a teenage boy, Adam. Emma realizes that Jess' murder was real, and she vows to find out who killed her. Meanwhile, Peter is shown dressed as the man who attacked her in the swamp.
| 3 | "Someone Worse Than Me" | Cherie Nowlan | Harriet Warner | February 19, 2021 |
Mary meets with a woman whose daughter was also believed to be murdered by Parker. However, the woman reveals that she has a tape of Parker saying that he did not kill her, leading Mary to believe that the real killer is still at large. John meets with a psychiatrist who placed Emma into a home and fights an urge to sexually assault her. He learns of the adoptive home and mother that Emma was placed with. Emma investigates the group home, St. James, and learns that Peter used to work there but was suspended for inappropriate behavior, all while learning more about Rose. Emma begins to feel threatened by Peter and thinks he has something to do with Jess' death, or at least something else. Peter tries to force her to take her meds, but she refuses. Mary is still having sex with Adam each night. Mary releases the video of the mother meeting with Parker, which gains media attention. A flashback reveals Emma was involved with kidnapping Parker's victims, despite having denied it earlier. Emma calls her adoptive mother, who is being watched by John.
| 4 | "I Don't Know You" | Alrick Riley | Erica Lipez | February 19, 2021 |
In a flash back, we see Pete trying to help Emma in prison but she doesn't accept his offer for witness relocation until she becomes a target of other inmates' violence due to her alleged crimes. Emma remembers seeing a blonde girl getting tattooed by Kit but later leaving his van unharmed. Mary lies to her son and says she is taking a break from everything for a spa getaway but in reality she is meeting up with John in Minnesota to talk to Emma's mother, Esther. John has been taking advantage of Esther's dementia by pretending to be her late husband, Roger, and forming a trusting bond, which the dark and angry presence of Mary obviously disrupts. Meanwhile, Emma confronts Pete about his murky past but he says it's just because he works for the federal government. However, he threatens to relocate Emma and her suspicions lead her to search the cabin (which turns out to be his) and finds a picture of him with a young girl. Emma goes to St. Jerome's to talk to a young boy, Jay, about Pete but they are interrupted. Emma bumps into Rose at the shelter and they leave together. Rose confides in Emma that her mom locks her in her room at night to protect her from dangerous men. When Emma doesn't disagree, Rose starts asking questions which prompts Emma to leave her and find more clues about the mystery of St. Jeromes. After an unsettling dinner with John, Mary goes to talk to Esther to apologize for bringing John into her life, but she reveals she knows she's trying to find Emma and because she concedes that she will not give her location until her last breath, in a fit of rage, Mary suffocates Esther with a pillow. Later, John views a secret recording of Mary's murder.
| 5 | "I Got Here By Myself" | Louise Friedberg | Steve Harper | February 19, 2021 |
| 6 | "I'm A Good Person" | Lisa Siwe | Cathryn Humphris | February 19, 2021 |
| 7 | "Now You See Me" | John Polson | N Beckwith | February 19, 2021 |
| 8 | "Be Mine" | Emile Levisetti | Deborah Schoeneman | February 19, 2021 |
| 9 | "Gotcha" | Daisy von Scherler Mayer | Steve Harper | February 19, 2021 |
| 10 | "The Dead Come Back" | John Polson | Harriet Warner | February 19, 2021 |

== Production ==
=== Development ===
On July 24, 2017, TNT officially gave the production, then called Deadlier Than the Male, a pilot order. The show was one of two pilots that TNT ordered with an eye toward a new programming block it is prepping, TNT Mystery, along with Deep Mad Dark.

On February 15, 2018, it was announced that TNT had given a series order to be created and written by Harriet Warner. The series order was reportedly for a first season in which Warner will also executive produce alongside Bruna Papandrea and Casey Haver. John Polson directed the series and also serves as an executive producer. Production companies involved in the series include Made Up Stories and Studio T. On June 18, 2018, it was announced that the series had been retitled Tell Me Your Secrets.

In June 2020, it was announced the series would not be aired on TNT and had been scrapped. However, at the end of October 2020, Amazon Prime Video announced it had acquired the series set to air in 2021. On January 27, 2021, it was announced that the series would premiere on February 19, 2021.

=== Casting ===
Alongside the initial series announcement, it was reported that Lily Rabe, Amy Brenneman, Hamish Linklater, Enrique Murciano, Chiara Aurelia, Ashley Madekwe, and Bryant Tardy had joined the show in series regular roles. In June 2018, it was reported that Xavier Samuel and Stella Baker had joined the main cast and that Marque Richardson would appear in a recurring capacity. In July 2018, it was announced that Katherine Willis and Charles Esten had been cast in recurring roles.

=== Filming ===
Principal photography for the series took place in mid-2018 in New Orleans, Louisiana.

== Reception ==
The critical response to Tell Me Your Secrets has been mixed. Review aggregator Rotten Tomatoes reported an approval rating of 50% based on 22 reviews. The website's critical consensus reads, "Lily Rabe, Amy Brenneman, and a glut of insane mysteries nearly save Tell Me Your Secrets - alas, it's simply too underwritten and cynical to fulfill its alluring promise." On Metacritic, it has a weighted average score of 55 out of 100 based on 6 reviews, indicating "mixed or average reviews".
