= Lambs of God =

2019 Australian television drama series

- Created by: Marele Day
- Written by: Sarah Lambert
- Directed by: Jeffrey Walker
- Composer: Bryony Marks
- Country of origin: Australia
- No. of seasons: 1
- No. of episodes: 4

Production
- Executive producers: Helen Bowden; Penny Win; Mark Fennessy; Carl Fennessy
- Producers: Jason Stephens; Elisa Argenzio; Sarah Lambert
- Editor: Deb Peart
- Running time: 60min
- Production companies: Lingo Pictures; Endemol Shine Australia

Original release
- Network: Foxtel
- Release: July 21 – July 28, 2019

Lambs of God is a 2019 Australian television gothic drama series on Foxtel's Showcase. The series was adapted from Marele Day's 1997 novel of the same name about three eccentric nuns living on a secluded and remote island. They have been forgotten by time and the Catholic Church and are forced to defend their lives and beliefs when a priest, Father Ignatius, unwittingly finds them.

== Plot ==
Three Catholic nuns, Sisters Iphigenia, Margarita and Carla, are the last remaining members of the enclosed order of St. Agnes living on a remote island with a flock of sheep which they believe are the reincarnations of their departed sisters. A young priest, Father Ignatius, arrives to survey the supposedly abandoned abbey for the church, but he is injured and becomes their prisoner. His presence stirs very different emotions in each of the nuns which come to a climax when another envoy from the church, Father Bob, is sent to investigate and dies after falling into a trap. While Iphigenia travels to the mainland to claim her inheritance to save the abbey, Margarita accidentally creates a miracle and heals Ignatius' foot. The abbey then becomes a commercial success as an attraction for pilgrims.

== Production ==
Filming commenced in May 2018 at Fox Studios and on location in the Blue Mountains, the New South Wales south coast and Tasmania. The series is written by Sarah Lambert, directed by Jeffrey Walker and Don McAlpine is director of photography.

== Cast ==
- Essie Davis as Sister Iphigenia
- Ann Dowd as Sister Margarita
- Jessica Barden as Sister Carla
- Sam Reid as Father Ignatius
- Kate Mulvany as Frankie
- Daniel Henshall as Barnaby
- Ezekiel Simat as Jeremiah
- Damon Herriman as Father Bob
- Arianthe Galani as Abess
- John Bell as Bishop Malone
- Eddie Baroo as Groundsman

== Episodes ==
| No. | Title | Directed by | Written by | Original release date |
|---|---|---|---|---|
| 1 | "The Devil into Paradise" | Jeffrey Walker | Sarah Lambert | 21 July 2019 |
Father Ignatius arrives at what was supposed to be an abandoned church facility on a remote island. He is surprised to find three eccentric nuns living a self-sufficient existence. After he announces that the facility will be closed, they drug him and steal his clothes. He flees for his life during the night, only to fall and injure himself. Later, he awakes to find that he is their captive while they conspire to remove any trace of his arrival.
| 2 | "The Blood of Eden" | Jeffrey Walker | Sarah Lambert | 21 July 2019 |
With Ignatius now a prisoner of the three nuns, he is encouraged to become one of their order and learns to knit. However, when sister Carla tries to relieve his tension by placing her hand beneath his blanket he accuses her of being a harlot. Ignatius then uses a shell that sister Carla gave him to remove the cast placed around his legs. Meanwhile, Ignatius' sister Frankie is concerned when she does not hear from him, and convinces the police to send a helicopter to search the island. Ignatius sees the helicopter and tries to attract its attention, but he is pushed out of the window by Carla who feels betrayed.
| 3 | "The Beast Incarnate" | Jeffrey Walker | Sarah Lambert | 28 July 2019 |
Ignatius survives the fall from the window but sustains serious injuries to his leg and is confined to his room. Iphigenia secretly uses Ignatius' phone to contact her lawyer to access her funds to purchase the convent, claiming to be the missing heiress to the Stanford estate. However, the lawyer requires proof and so she plans to meet him to confirm her identity. The demons possessing Margarita cause her to see Ignatius as the devil and she plans to kill him, but she sees her own shadow as the beast and wounds herself instead. Meanwhile Carla feels drawn to Ignatius and she gives him his mobile phone to contact his sister. Instead he calls the bishop to confirm that he is alive and a prisoner of the nuns on the island. The bishop receives the message as the funeral for Ignatius is in progress but nonetheless proceeds with the funeral. Meanwhile, the priest Father Bob approaches Ignatius' sister Frankie, seeking information about her brother without revealing his motives, although he arouses the suspicions of Sergeant Barnaby. Iphigenia departs, leaving Ignatius in the care of Margarita and Carla.
| 4 | "Resurrection" | Jeffrey Walker | Sarah Lambert | 28 July 2019 |
Iphigenia travels to the mainland and does what is necessary to secure her inheritance. It is revealed that Carla is Iphigenia's daughter. Meanwhile a memorial is held in the mainland for Ignatius who is presumed dead. Father Bob arrives on the island intending to dispose of the Sisters of St Agnes. He is led into a trap and is impaled on wooden stakes after falling into a deep pit. While hiding in an oven, Ignatius and Carla act on their attraction towards each other, but are interrupted by Sister Margarita. Margarita sets a ring of fire around Ignatius, but rather than killing him, his damaged foot is healed and he reveres her as a miracle worker. Ignatius and Carla return to the mainland together and he reunites with his sister. One year later, Carla has given birth to a baby, and the island has become a shrine to the miracle of Sister Margarita and is besieged by hordes of pilgrims who are allowed to visit one day per year.
