= Mac Gudgeon =

Australian screenwriter (1949–2023)

- Born: 2 March 1949; Woollongong, New South Wales, Australia
- Died: 25 May 2023 (aged 74)
- Occupation(s): Screenwriter, producer
- Notable work: Last Ride (2009 film)

Mac Gudgeon (2 March 1949 – 25 May 2023) was an Australian film and television screenwriter and producer.

== Biography ==
=== Career ===
Gudgeon was perhaps best known for writing the television mini-series Waterfront, The Petrov Affair, Killing Time and for co-writing The Secret River.

Gudgeon's film screenwriting include Last Ride and he co-wrote the screenplays for Ground Zero, The Delinquents and Wind.

Gudgeon served as president of the Australian Writers' Guild from 1998 to 2000, and received a lifetime membership in 2002.

Gudgeon died on 25 May 2023, at the age of 74. Among those to pay tribute to Gudgeon after his death were Australian Writers' Guild president Shane Brennan, former president Jan Sardi and film producer Roger Simpson.

== Filmography ==
Title	Year	Role
Waterfront (mini-series)	1984	as Writer (3 episodes)
The Petrov Affair (miniseries)	1987	as Writer (3 episodes)
Ground Zero (film)	1987	Written by
Georgia (film)	1988	based on an original story by
The Delinquents (film)	1989	Screenplay
Skirts (TV series)	1990	as Writer (2 episodes)
Wind (film)	1992	Screenplay
Snowy (mini-series)	1993	as Writer (1 episode)
Sky Trackers (TV series)	1994	Written by (3 episodes)
Stingers (TV series) (TV series)	1998	as Writer (1 episode)
Good Guys, Bad Guys (TV series)	1997-1998	Written by
Dogwoman: A Grrrl's Best Friend (TV movie)	2000	Written by
Halifax f.p. (TV series)	1995-2001	Written by (3 episodes)
Wolf Creek (film)	2005	Script editor
Monash: The Forgotton Anzac (TV movie)	2008	Written by
The Last Ride	2009	Screenplay
Killing Time (TV miniseries)	2011	Written by (4 episodes)
Fatal Honeymoon (TV movie)	2012	Written by
Devil Dust	2012	Script editor
THe Secret River (miniseries)	2015	Screenplay by (2 episodes)
