= Penguin Bloom =

2020 drama film

- Australian theatrical release poster
- Directed by: Glendyn Ivin
- Written by: Shaun Grant; Harry Cripps
- Based on: Penguin Bloom by: Cameron Bloom; Bradley Trevor Greive
- Produced by: Emma Cooper; Bruna Papandrea; Steve Hutensky; Jodi Matterson; Naomi Watts
- Starring: Naomi Watts; Andrew Lincoln; Jacki Weaver
- Cinematography: Sam Chiplin
- Edited by: Maria Papoutsis
- Music by: Marcelo Zarvos
- Production companies: Screen Australia; Endeavor Content; Create NSW; Made Up Stories; Jam Tart Films; Broadtalk
- Distributed by: Roadshow Films (Australia); Netflix (United States)
- Release dates: 12 September 2020 (TIFF); 21 January 2021 (Australia); 27 January 2021 (United States)
- Running time: 95 minutes
- Countries: Australia; United States
- Language: English
- Box office: $6.3 million

Penguin Bloom is a 2020 Australian drama film directed by Glendyn Ivin, from a screenplay by Shaun Grant and Harry Cripps, and is based on the book of the same name by Cameron Bloom and Bradley Trevor Greive. It stars Naomi Watts, Andrew Lincoln and Jacki Weaver. The book and film are based on a true story of Sam and Cameron Bloom's family and their interactions with an Australian magpie named 'Penguin'.

It was theatrically released in Australia by Roadshow Films on 21 January 2021 and digitally in the United States by Netflix on 27 January.

== Plot ==
Mother of three Sam Bloom accidentally falls off a roof due to a rotten wooden bracket during her family's summer vacation in Thailand. She breaks her T6 thoracic vertebrae, resulting in partial paralysis from her mid-back down. Back home in Australia, Sam, once an avid surfer, struggles to adjust to life as a paraplegic, but is supported by her husband Cameron, their three sons Noah, Rueben, and Oli, and Sam's overbearing mother Jan.

In the first months, Sam lacks motivation to interact, closing the curtains to sit in the dark, deliberately pushing a glass jar of honey on the floor, etc. She is encouraged by her mother and Cameron to leave the house, but she resists. One afternoon, the three boys find and bring home a magpie chick, which fell out of its nest, who they name Penguin.

Sam becomes despondent upon hearing one of the boys crying out for his father, having become violently ill from a bad oyster. Feeling useless, she cries with frustration. Noah asks Sam to work on getting Penguin to eat. Initially feeling too down to care for the bird, she musters the strength to help, understanding it is important to Noah. As time goes on, Sam bonds with Penguin.

Feeling guilty for being the one who asked his mum to go up to the roof in Thailand, Noah has withdrawn from her since the accident. Sam and Cameron's relationship also deteriorates as she struggles to find joy in daily life and wishes to forget who she was before the fall, since she can no longer live in the same way. She demands he never ask her how she is.

After several weeks, Penguin fully recovers and learns to fly, inspiring Sam to want to do something for herself; she starts kayaking lessons. For Sam's birthday, the Blooms go for dinner at Jan's house, joined by Sam's sister Kylie and Sam's kayaking instructor Gaye. While Jan and Cameron argue about Sam's new life and their responsibilities to her, Penguin is attacked by two larger magpies and then flies away.

Sam eventually confronts Noah about his guilt and tells him he is not to blame for what happened to her. She apologises for being distant and reveals she has found her strength, and the whole family reconcile. Sam requests Cameron ask her how she is, and when he does, she replies, "I'm better."

When Penguin returns home a few days later, Sam thanks her for helping her recover, before the bird flies away for good.

== Cast ==
- Naomi Watts as Sam Bloom, Cameron's wife and Jan's daughter.
- Andrew Lincoln as Cameron Bloom, Sam's husband
- Griffin Murray-Johnston as Noah Bloom
- Felix Cameron as Rueben Bloom
- Abe Clifford-Barr as Oli Bloom
- Jacki Weaver as Jan, Sam's mother
- Rachel House as Gaye
- Leeanna Walsman as Kylie
- Lisa Hensley as Bron

== Production ==
The rights to the book were acquired in December 2016 by Bruna Papandrea. Naomi Watts was set to star and to co-produce with Mark Audet, Emma Cooper, and Made Up Stories. In June 2017, Shaun Grant was hired to write the screenplay. By February 2019, Glendyn Ivin was set to direct, and in July Andrew Lincoln, Jacki Weaver and Rachel House were added to the cast.

Filming began in Australia in early August 2019.

== Release ==
Penguin Bloom had its world premiere at the Toronto International Film Festival on 12 September 2020.

The film was released theatrically in Australia on 21 January 2021 by Roadshow Films, and hit number one at the Australian box office for its opening weekend.

Netflix released the film in North America, the United Kingdom, Ireland, South Africa, France and select Asian countries on 27 January 2021.

== Reception ==
Review aggregator Rotten Tomatoes gives the film a 67% approval rating based on 84 reviews, with an average rating of 6.1/10. The website's critical consensus reads: "Penguin Bloom's fact-based story could have been adapted with greater nuance, but strong work from Naomi Watts and Andrew Lincoln adds some much-needed heart." According to Metacritic, which sampled 17 critics and calculated a weighted average score of 54 out of 100, the film received "mixed or average reviews".

The script for Penguin Bloom by Shaun Grant and Harry Cripps was shortlisted for the Betty Roland Prize for Scriptwriting at the 2021 New South Wales Premier's Literary Awards.

== Accolades ==
Award	Ceremony date	Category	Subject	Result	Ref
AACTA Awards	December 8, 2021	Best Film	Emma Cooper, Steve Hutensky, Jodi Matterson, Bruna Papandrea, Naomi Watts	Nominated	
AACTA Awards	December 8, 2021	Best Direction	Glendyn Ivin	Nominated	
AACTA Awards	December 8, 2021	Best Adapted Screenplay	Harry Cripps and Shaun Grant	Nominated	
AACTA Awards	December 8, 2021	Best Actress	Naomi Watts	Nominated	
AACTA Awards	December 8, 2021	Best Supporting Actress	Jacki Weaver	Nominated	
AACTA Awards	December 8, 2021	Best Cinematography	Sam Chiplin	Nominated	
AACTA Awards	December 8, 2021	Best Original Music Score	Marcelo Zarvos	Nominated	
AACTA Awards	December 8, 2021	Best Production Design	Annie Beauchamp	Nominated	
