= Long Slow Exhale =

American television drama series

- Genre: Drama
- Created by: Pam Veasey
- Directed by: Anton Cropper
- Starring: Rose Rollins
- Country of origin: United States
- Original language: English
- No. of episodes: 12

Production
- Executive producers: Pam Veasey; Bruna Papandrea; Casey Haver; Anton Cropper; John Dove
- Production companies: Made Up Stories; Green Eggs & Pam Productions; Paramount Television Studios

Original release
- Network: BET
- Release: April 4 – April 25, 2022

Long Slow Exhale is an American women's basketball drama television series created by Pam Veasey that aired on Spectrum Originals and BET. From Paramount Television Studios, Veasey executive produced alongside her former L.A.'s Finest collaborators Anton Cropper and Jon Dove, bringing the trio back to Spectrum after the Bad Boys spinoff served as their first scripted originals foray. Cropper also directed the series. Also executive producing were Bruna Papandrea and Casey Haver for Made Up Stories. The series premiered April 4, 2022 and was canceled after one season in June 2022.

== Premise ==
A competitive women's college basketball team head coach, J.C. Abernathy, finds herself in a potentially career-ending sexual abuse scandal. As she tries to find the truth among the many secrets she uncovers, she has to make hard decisions that will affect her, her family and the team of female athletes who all rely on her.

== Cast and characters ==
=== Main ===
- Rose Rollins as J.C. Abernathy, Head Coach
- Josh Lucas as Hillman Ford, Athletic Director of the university
- Ian Harding as Eddie Hagan, Assistant Coach
- Lyriq Bent as Garrett Carter, J.C.'s husband
- Shalini Bathina as Emily Fisk, Associate Head Coach
- Enajite Esegine as Jordan Malone
- Brittney Elena as Corrine Porter
- Jazmine Stewart as Verdell
- Isabella Star LaBlanc as Elfrina
- Carmen Flood as Nikki Dessandro
- Erin Croom as Lorna Avery

=== Recurring ===
- Famke Janssen as Dr. Melinda Barrington, Chancellor of the university
- Samantha Bartow as Shannon Crawford, the star three-pointer on the Clayton Hall Cougars
- Brent Sexton as Arlin Swayne, a former Atlanta police officer
- Tony Gonzalez as Desmond, Corrine's father, a former professional football player and Clayton Hall superstar
- Jaiden Kaine as Deputy Belmont
- Gabrielle Byndloss as Vivian, J.C.'s assistant
- Enya Flack as Jillian Porter, Corrine's step-mother
- Melissa Saint-Amand as Claire Brockman
- Britt Rentschler are Rachel Fleming
- Betsy Borrego as Jessica Owens
- Anabella Raye as Kate Ford

== Episodes ==
No.	Title	Directed by	Written by	Original release date
1	"Traveling Violations"	Anton Cropper	Pam Veasey	April 4, 2022
After winning the NCAA Women’s Basketball Championship, Head Coach J.C. Abernathy’s path to a repeat victory is threatened when a team scandal begins to surface, and a dead body appears without warning.
2	"Full Court Press"	Anton Cropper	Pam Veasey & Brook Sitgraves Turner	April 4, 2022
As the university tries to keep a scandalous story contained, J.C. gets an ominous warning.
3	"Power Forward"	Michael Smith	John Dove & Molly Miller	April 4, 2022
As more women find the courage to come forward, J.C. struggles with having missed what was happening right under her nose.
4	"Away Game"	Michael Smith	Michael J. Ballin & Thomas Aguilar	April 11, 2022
A bold choice from J.C. puts her in some dangerous crosshairs, and late-night drills on the road force the team to a breaking point.
5	"Setting the Screen"	Emma Westenberg	Molly Miller	April 11, 2022
Following her injury, Shannon begins to reconsider her position on keeping coach’s misconduct a secret.
6	"Pressure Defense"	Emma Westenberg	Brook Sitgraves Turner	April 11, 2022
Shannon agrees to an on-camera interview, and Jordan’s impromptu post on social media comes with consequences.
7	"Technical Foul"	Crystle Roberson	Michael J. Ballin & Thomas Aguilar	April 18, 2022
As J.C. tries to figure out who she can still trust, some damning personal drama catches up to one of the team members right before a big game.
8	"Out of Bounds"	Crystle Roberson	Jonathan Curtiss	April 18, 2022
Increasingly suspicious of the university administration, J.C. works to piece together the mystery of Hillman’s sordid past.
9	"High Post"	Pete Chatmon	Pam Veasey & Estevan	April 18, 2022
As J.C. continues to dig into the university’s cover ups, she must decide whether or not she’ll ever come forward with the truth.
10	"Dead Ball Foul"	Pete Chatmon	John Dove	April 25, 2022
As J.C. reflects on quieter moments of her past, a pivotal figure finally comes forward with the truth as Hillman spirals towards his demise.
11	"Fast Break"	Anton Cropper	Pam Veasey	April 25, 2022
Following the shocking death, J.C. turns to a trusted ally for help; meanwhile, the team must put aside their differences to save one of their own.
12	"Madness"	Anton Cropper	Pam Veasey & John Dove	April 25, 2022
With the playoff tournament underway, evidence mounts around Hillman’s accident; meanwhile, J.C. is running out of places to hide as the walls close in around her.

== Production ==
The show was announced on February 9, 2021, with the cast announcement of Rose Rollins. There would be twelve episodes in the series. The series, from Paramount Television Studios, would launch first on Spectrum and then on BET after nine months. It was noted that this windowing strategy "is a way to split the costs of producing high-end scripted fare during a time in which many media companies are focusing less on linear networks."

The show was in development/pre-production in Atlanta, GA. It was reported that filming would begin in Atlanta in March.

Josh Lucas was announced on February 19, 2021. Jeff Schine was announced on March 4, 2021 but due to scheduling conflicts, he was replaced by Ian Harding as announced on March 24, 2021. Famke Janssen was announced on March 9, 2021. Lyriq Bent, Shalini Bathina, and the series regulars and recurring cast were also all announced on March 24, 2021. Melissa Saint-Amand was announced on August 4, 2021.
