= The Lost Flowers of Alice Hart =

Australian television series

- Genre: Drama
- Created by: Sarah Lambert
- Based on: The Lost Flowers of Alice Hart by Holly Ringland
- Screenplay by: Sarah Lambert; Kirsty Fisher; Kim Wilson
- Directed by: Glendyn Ivin
- Starring: Sigourney Weaver; Asher Keddie; Alycia Debnam-Carey; Alyla Browne; Leah Purcell; Frankie Adams; Alexander England; Charlie Vickers; Tilda Cobham-Hervey; Sebastián Zurita; Shareena Clanton
- Theme music composer: Hania Rani
- Country of origin: Australia
- Original language: English
- No. of episodes: 7

Production
- Executive producers: Sigourney Weaver; Jodi Matterson; Bruna Papandrea; Steve Hutensky; Allie Goss; Sarah Lambert; Glendyn Ivin; Lucinda Reynolds
- Producer: Barbara Gibbs
- Cinematography: Sam Chiplin
- Editors: Dany Cooper; Deborah Peart
- Running time: 51–63 minutes
- Production companies: Amazon Studios; Made Up Stories; Fifth Season

Original release
- Network: Amazon Prime Video
- Release: 4 August – 1 September 2023

The Lost Flowers of Alice Hart is an Australian drama miniseries created by Sarah Lambert and based on the novel by Holly Ringland. All seven episodes were directed by Glendyn Ivin, and were released by Amazon Studios from 4 August to 1 September 2023.

The series received positive reviews for its direction and performances, in particular Weaver's. It received 12 nominations at the 13th AACTA Awards, including Best Miniseries, Best Lead Actress in Drama for Weaver, and Best Supporting Actress in Drama for Debnam-Carey and Leah Purcell.

== Synopsis ==
Set in Australia, the series follows Alice Hart (Alyla Browne and Alycia Debnam-Carey), a girl abused by her father who finds herself orphaned after a fire and is taken in by her estranged grandmother (Sigourney Weaver), who runs a flower plant nursery doubling as a haven for "Flowers", women who were victims of domestic abuse.

== Cast ==
=== Main cast ===
- Sigourney Weaver as June Hart, Alice's paternal grandmother who takes her in after the death of Alice's parents, but hides many secrets from her granddaughter.
- Alyla Browne and Alycia Debnam-Carey as Alice Hart, the abused daughter of Agnes and Clem who is raised by June after her parents' death, only to face another crisis as a grown-up. Browne portrays Alice as a child, and Debnam-Carey portrays her as a young adult.
- Asher Keddie as Sally Morgan, a librarian who realizes the abuse Alice and her mother suffer, and later tries to adopt Alice before adopting Charlie.
- Leah Purcell as Twig, June's wife
- Frankie Adams as Candy Blue, June and Twig's adopted daughter
  - Catherine Laga'aia as young Candy
- Alexander England as John Morgan, a policeman and Sally's husband
- Charlie Vickers as Clem Hart, Alice's abusive father, Agnes' husband and June's estranged son
  - Jack Latorre as young Clem Hart
- Tilda Cobham-Hervey as Agnes Hart, Alice's mother
- Sebastián Zurita as Dylan, a ranger Alice falls in love with as an adult
- Shareena Clanton as Ruby, a ranger who becomes Alice's friend
- Bree Bain as May

=== Guests ===
- Andrew McFarlane as Dr Harris
- Catherine McClements as Sarah
- Emma Lung as Nurse Brooke Jansen
- Jeremy Blewitt as Charlie Morgan, Alice's brother who was adopted by Sally and John as a newborn
- Victoria Haralabidou as Jana

== Episodes ==
No.	Title	Directed by	Screenplay by	Original release date
1	"Part 1: Black Fire Orchid"	Glendyn Ivin	Sarah Lambert	August 4, 2023
Young Alice Hart is growing up in a seemingly happy environment. A kind librarian becomes suspicious when she finds Alice covered in bruises. When Alice is taken to hospital, injured, it is revealed that her abusive father and expectant mother were killed in a fire under mysterious circumstances. When Alice's estranged paternal grandmother, June, arrives to claim custody of her, it becomes clear that there is more to the story than meets the eye.
2	"Part 2: Wattle"	Glendyn Ivin	Sarah Lambert	August 4, 2023
3	"Part 3: Lantern Bush"	Glendyn Ivin	Kirsty Fisher and Sarah Lambert	August 4, 2023
4	"Part 4: River Lily"	Glendyn Ivin	Kim Wilson and Sarah Lambert	August 11, 2023
5	"Part 5: Desert Oak"	Glendyn Ivin	Kirsty Fisher and Sarah Lambert	August 18, 2023
6	"Part 6: Wheel of Fire"	Glendyn Ivin	Kim Wilson	August 25, 2023
7	"Part 7: Sturt's Desert Pea"	Glendyn Ivin	Sarah Lambert	September 1, 2023

== Production ==
In May 2021, it was announced that Made Up Stories, Amazon Studios and Endeavor Content would produce an adaptation of the book The Lost Flowers of Alice Hart, with filming taking place in Australia. Sigourney Weaver was announced as starring and executive producing, with Sarah Lambert show running and executive producing, Glendyn Ivin as director and executive producer, and Jodi Matterson, Bruna Papandrea, Steve Hutensky and Allie Goss also executive producing.

Filming began in October 2021 in Sydney and the regions of New South Wales and the Northern Territory. It was confirmed that Asher Keddie, Leah Purcell, Alycia Debnam-Carey, Frankie Adams, Alexander England, Charlie Vickers, Tilda Cobham-Hervey and Alyla Browne had been added to the cast. In April 2022, Sebastián Zurita was cast, Kirsty Fisher and Kim Wilson were announced as co-writers alongside Lambert, Barbara Gibbs was confirmed as producer and Lucinda Reynolds as co-executive producer. In September 2022, production company Endeavour Content rebranded as Fifth Season.

== Release ==
Amazon Studios announced the show will be available in over 240 countries and territories through the streaming service Amazon Prime Video. It premiered on 4 August 2023, with the first three episodes available immediately and a new episode debuting on a weekly basis until the series finale on 1 September 2023.

On 16 August 2023, Mediaweek reported that the series set a record for highest viewership of an Australian series worldwide. It also reached the top five in 78 countries and top three in 42 countries on Prime Video.

== Reception ==
On review aggregator Rotten Tomatoes, 82% of 34 critics gave the series a positive review, with an average rating of 7.2/10. The website's critical consensus reads, "Sigourney Weaver is excellent as a thorny matriarch in The Lost Flowers of Alice Hart, a visually appealing and well-acted melodrama." On Metacritic, the series holds a weighted average score of 66 out of 100 based on 16 critics, indicating "generally favorable reviews".

== Accolades ==
Award	Year of ceremony	Category	Recipient(s)	Result	Ref.
AACTA Awards	2024	Best Miniseries or Telefeature	Jodi Matterson, Bruna Papandrea, Steve Hutensky, Barbara Gibbs, Sarah Lambert, Glendyn Ivin – Made Up Stories, Amazon Studios, Fifth Season (Amazon Prime Video)	Won	
AACTA Awards	2024	Best Lead Actress in a Television Drama	Sigourney Weaver	Nominated	
AACTA Awards	2024	Best Guest or Supporting Actress in a Television Drama	Alycia Debnam-Carey	Nominated	
AACTA Awards	2024	Best Guest or Supporting Actress in a Television Drama	Leah Purcell	Nominated	
AACTA Awards	2024	Best Direction in Television	Glendyn Ivin (episode 1)	Nominated	
AACTA Awards	2024	Best Casting	Jane Norris	Nominated	
AACTA Awards	2024	Best Cinematography in Television	Sam Chiplin (episode 1)	Won	
AACTA Awards	2024	Best Editing in Television	Deborah Peart (episode 1)	Nominated	
AACTA Awards	2024	Best Editing in Television	Deborah Peart, Dany Cooper (episode 6)	Nominated	
AACTA Awards	2024	Best Production Design in Television	Melinda Doring (episode 1)	Won	
AACTA Awards	2024	Best Sound in Television	David Lee, Robert MacKenzie, Leah Katz, James Ashton (episode 6)	Won	
AACTA Awards	2024	Best Hair and Makeup	Lara Jade Birch, Georgia Lockhart-Adams	Nominated	
AWGIE Awards	2024	Television – Limited Series	Sarah Lambert, Kirsty Fisher, Kim Wilson	Nominated	
Young Artist Award	2024	Best Performance in a Streaming Series: Leading Youth Artist	Alyla Browne	Nominated	
TV Week Logies	2024	Best Lead Actress in a Drama	Sigourney Weaver	Nominated	
TV Week Logies	2024	Best Supporting Actress	Leah Purcell	Nominated	
TV Week Logies	2024	Graham Kennedy Award for Most Popular New Talent	Alyla Browne	Nominated	
TV Week Logies	2024	Best Miniseries or Telemovie	The Lost Flowers of Alice Hart	Nominated	

== See also ==
- List of Australian television series
