= Alexander England =

Australian actor

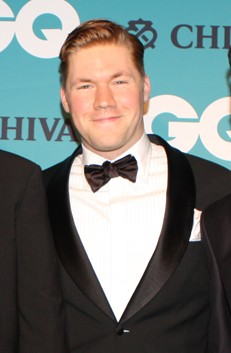
- England in 2012
- Born: Alexander England
- Occupation: Actor
- Years active: 1995–present
- Known for: Howzat! Kerry Packer's War (2012); Little Monsters (2019); Black Snow (2022)

Alexander England is an Australian actor. He is known for his role in the 2022 TV series Black Snow, and in 2026 appears in the drama feature film Life Could Be a Dream and the Netflix TV series My Brilliant Career.

== Early life and education ==
Alexander England is from Albury in New South Wales, where he attended Scots School Albury.

== Career ==
England was selected to play Tony Greig, a former captain of the English cricket team known in Australia for his cricketing commentary, in 2012 for the television miniseries Howzat! Kerry Packer's War. To copy Greig's distinctive accent, England listened to commentary recordings.

In 2016, England was cast to play Harry Crewe in the Australian television series Offspring, joining the show in season 6.

England starred opposite Lupita Nyong'o and Josh Gad in the 2019 zombie comedy horror film Little Monsters, and in the same year appeared in the Channel 7 drama Secret Bridesmaids' Business.

In 2022 he played Anton in the TV drama series Black Snow, for which he was nominated for a Logie Award for Most Outstanding Supporting Actor. In 2023, he appeared in Stan series Caught.

England stars as abusive husband Jake in the 2026 Australian drama film Life Could Be a Dream. He also plays Julius Bossier in the Netflix TV series adaptation of My Brilliant Career which was released in August 2026.

== Filmography ==
=== Film ===
Year	Title	Role	Notes
2022	How to Please a Woman	Tom	
2019	Danger Close: The Battle of Long Tan	CSM Jack Kirby	
2019	Little Monsters	David "Dave" Anderson	
2017	Alien: Covenant	Ankor	
2016	Down Under	Shit-Stick	
2016	Gods of Egypt	Mnevis	
2014	Parer's War	Chester Wilmot	
2026	Life Could Be a Dream	Jake	
TBA	Scales	TBA	

=== Television ===
Year	Title	Role	Notes
2026	My Brilliant Career	Julius	
2026	Small Town Scandal	Matt	
2024	Nautilus	Cornelius Fogg	1 episode
2023	Caught	Phil Choi	6 episodes
2023	The Lost Flowers of Alice Hart	John Morgan	7 episodes
2022	Black Snow	Anton	6 episodes
2022	Barons (TV series)	Arthur Forman	2 episodes
2019	Secret Bridesmaids' Business	Jakob Novak	6 episodes
2018	Queen America	Rick Bishop	3 episodes
2016-17	Offspring	Harry Crewe	16 episodes
2015	The Beautiful Lie	Peter Levin	6 episodes
2014	Rake	Police officer	1 episode (Series 3)
2013	Power Games: The Packer-Murdoch Story	Clyde Packer	Miniseries (2 Parts)
2013	Paper Giants: Magazine Wars	James Packer	Miniseries (2 Parts)
2012	Mr & Mrs Murder	Doyle	Episode: "The Course Whisperer"
2012	Howzat! Kerry Packer's War	Tony Greig	Miniseries
2012	Tricky Business	Damien Wilson	Episode: "Love Bites"
2011	Wild Boys	Conrad Fischer	10 episodes

=== Theatre ===
Year	Role/Character	Title/Production	Theater	Director	Notes
2013	Paris	Romeo and Juliet	Sydney Theatre Company	Kip Williams	
2011	Nil	The Nest	Hayloft Project	Anne-Louise Sarks	
2010	Macbeth	Manbeth	Forty Five Downstairs	Tanya Gertsie	An adaptation of Macbeth
2010	Phu Dien Vinh	For a Better World	Griffin Independent Theatre	Daisy Noyes	
2009	Mads Moen	Peer Gynt	VCA	Daniel Schlusser	
2009	Chrysale	The Learned Ladies	VCA	Paul Weingott	

== Awards and nominations ==
Year	Category	Award	Series	Result
2014	Best Supporting Actor in a Television Drama	AACTA Awards	Power Games: The Packer-Murdoch Story Part 1	Nominated
2023	Most Outstanding Supporting Actor	Logie Awards	Black Snow	Nominated
