= Jodi Matterson =

Australian producer

- Born: 1976 (age 49–50); Australia
- Occupations: Film producer; Managing Director, Australia of Made Up Stories; Founder of Silent Firework
- Years active: 2004 – present
- Spouse: Michael Napthali
- Children: 2

Jodi Matterson is an Australian producer who has produced films and TV series including Penguin Bloom (2020), The Dry (2020), Wolf Like Me (2022) and Nine Perfect Strangers, with Nicole Kidman. Matterson was managing director, Australia of film production company Made Up Stories alongside Bruna Papandrea and Steve Hutensky. Matterson exited Made Up Stories in April 2024 and launched her new film production company, Silent Firework.

== Career ==
Matterson started her career at university, putting on children's parties, and organising events. She met a film producer at a Starlight Foundation event, who offered her a role as a producer's assistant, after noticing her high level organisation skills.

In 2017, Matterson joined film and television production company Made Up Stories alongside Bruna Papandrea and Steve Hutensky as managing director, Australia.

It got to the point where I was getting more and more frustrated because I felt like I wasn’t getting to the next level,” she admits. “I’d made a bunch of things and I knew what I was doing, but I just needed that …” she makes a sprinkling motion “… whatever it was.

Matterson has been involved in the production of TV series such as The Lost Flowers of Alice Hart, based on the book by Holly Ringland, and starring Sigourney Weaver. She was also producer of Wolf Like Me, starring Isla Fisher, as well as Nine Perfect Strangers, written by Australian author Lianne Moriaty and starring Nicole Kidman. Her credits include producer, actress, and casting. Other productions include Roar (2022), and Little Monsters (2019).

Matterson has been listed as an actress for productions including Down Under (2016), Water Rats (1996), and G.P. (1994).

Patterson is part of a production company called Made Up Stories, with Bruna Papandrea, which has created a series of TV and films. The production company created a number of films and TV series during the pandemic lockdown.

The company’s television roster includes Hugh Grant and Nicole Kidman thriller The Undoing, Pieces of Her with Toni Colette and Nine Perfect Strangers, which reunited Papandrea and Kidman with their Big Little Lies author Liane Moriarty. On the film side, it just saw Luckiest Girl Alive, starring Mila Kunis, top the Netflix Top 10 chart globally while Eric Bana vehicle The Dry and Naomi Watts starrer Penguin Bloom were responsible for bringing the Australian box office back to life in 2021. All of this achieved against the backdrop of a pandemic, nonetheless.

Matterson described the empowerment and opportunities she hopes her production company, Made Up Stories provides:

“For me, Made Up Stories is also about empowerment and giving people opportunities. We have an amazing young filmmaker who just made a short film that knocked us out and we’ve been working on developing her for the last few years to make her feature debut. The editor we have on Penguin Bloom is a super-talented young girl and we want to give her an opportunity. The production designer we had on The Dry is another young girl, incredibly gifted and it was a big step up for her to do a movie of this scale. It’s such a rewarding thing to be able to facilitate.”

== Gender equity ==
Matterson is a supporter of diversity and equity, including staff in their production teams who have disabilities involved. She had, during the production of Penguin Bloom, a staff member called a director's attachment, who had cerebral palsy and is in a wheelchair, "she’s been so incredibly additive to our process.” Their production company claims to champion gender equity and women in film, 'putting women at the centre of film'.

== Personal life ==
Matterson is married to Michael Napthali. They have two daughters, the eldest was born in 2012.

Napthali is a lawyer, policy advisor and consultant. He currently is board member of Bell Shakespeare. Napthali is Director of Business Affairs at Matterson's production company, Eddie Wong Films. He was previously consultant at Made Up Stories.

In November, 2023 both Matterson and Napthali signed an online pledge on the Australian website, 'Say No to Antisemitism', that cites The Executive Council on Australian Jewry's statement that antisemitism has risen '482%' six weeks after the events of October 7. The signatories include Matterson's Made Up Stories colleagues, Papandrea and Hutensky. Independent Australian media company Crikey refutes this data.

Napthali was included in the 'z600' list, a group of over 600 individuals in a WhatsApp group chat whose members identified as Zionists. The group were industry professionals working in creative industries (music, arts, museums, film, etc.). The private group chat was leaked and its contents shared. The group was heavily criticized for encouraging the doxxing of pro-Palestinians living in Australia.

== Awards ==
Matterson has been nominated for and won a number of awards, including AACTA and FCCC awards, for her various film and TV series.

- 2022 - Wolf Like Me, AACTA award, best drama series.
- 2021 - The Dry, best film, FCCC award, nominee.
- 2021 - Penguin Bloom - AACTA award, nominee.
- 2014 - Twisted, Tropfest, 3rd prize, shared with Stuart Bowen, Ilana Lazar.
- 2013 - Not Suitable for Children, FCCC award, Best Film, nominee.
