= Glendyn Ivin =

Australian film and television director

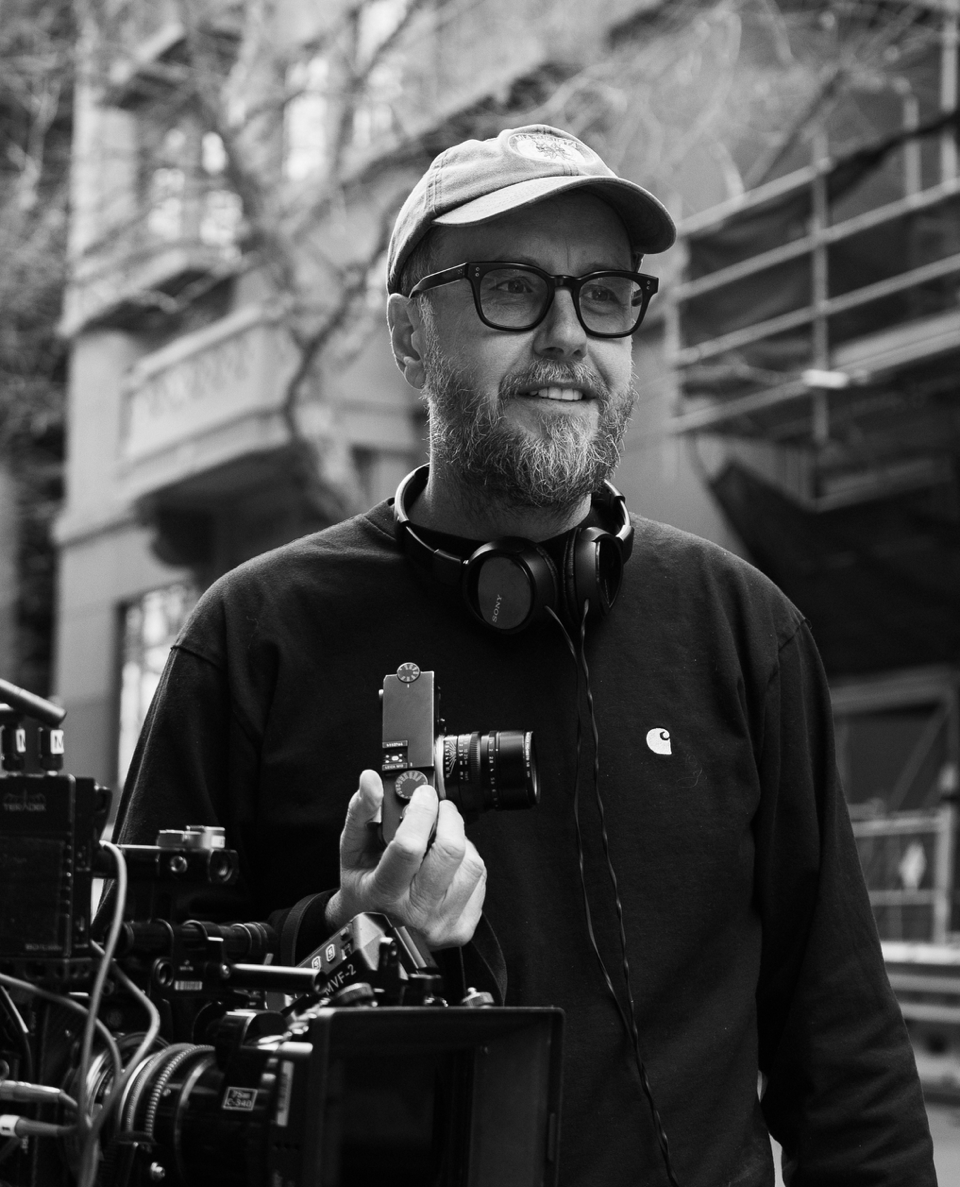
- Born: Tamworth, New South Wales, Australia
- Occupations: Director, writer, producer
- Years active: 2001–present

Glendyn Ivin is an Australian film and television director.

== Early life ==
Glendyn was born in Tamworth. He graduated from the University of Newcastle, Australia in 1993 with a Bachelor of Arts in graphic design. In 1998, he attended the Victorian College of the Arts, where he completed a Post Graduate diploma in documentary film.

== Career ==
In 2003, Glendyn directed his first short film, Cracker Bag, which won many awards including the Short Film Palme d'Or at the Cannes Film Festival. He has directed two feature films, Last Ride in 2009 and Penguin Bloom in 2020.

Glendyn also directed several television series like Seven Types of Ambiguity, Safe Harbour, The Lost Flowers of Alice Hart and more.

== Filmography ==
Short film

Year	Title	Director	Writer	Notes
2003	Cracker Bag	Yes	Yes	Also producer
2006	The Desert	Yes	Yes	Also editor

Feature film

- Last Ride (2009)
- Penguin Bloom (2020)

Television

Year	Title	Notes
2006	Two Twisted	1 episode
2010	Offspring	2 episodes
2012	Beaconsfield	TV movie
2012 - 2014	Puberty Blues	9 episodes
2015	Gallipoli	7 episodes
2016	The Beautiful Lie	3 episodes
2017	Seven Types of Ambiguity	2 episodes
2018	Safe Harbour	4 episodes
2018	The Cry	4 episodes
2023	The Lost Flowers of Alice Hart	7 episodes; Also executive producer

== Awards and nominations ==
Year	Result	Award	Category	Work	Ref.
2003	Won	Cannes Film Festival	Short Film Palme d'Or	Cracker Bag	
2003	Won	Australian Film Institute Awards	Best Short Fiction Film	Cracker Bag	
2003	Won	Australian Film Institute Awards	Best Screenplay in a Short Film	Cracker Bag	
2004	Won	Aspen Shortsfest	Special Jury Award	Cracker Bag	
2004	Won	Berlin International Film Festival	Best Short Film	Cracker Bag	
2009	Won	Rome Film Festival	Alice in the City Prize	Last Ride	
2009	Nominated	Australian Directors' Guild	Best Direction in a Feature Film	Last Ride	
2012	Nominated	Australian Directors' Guild	Best Direction in an Original Online Project	PlayGround	
2013	Nominated	AACTA Awards	Best Direction	Beaconsfield	
2017	Won	AACTA Awards	Best Direction in a Drama or Comedy	Seven Types of Ambiguity - Episode 2: "Alex"	
2018	Won	AACTA Awards	Best Television Direction	Safe Harbour	
2019	Won	International Emmy Awards	Best TV Movie or Miniseries	Safe Harbour	
2021	Nominated	AACTA Awards	Best Direction	Penguin Bloom	
2023	Nominated	Camerimage	TV Series Competition	The Lost Flowers of Alice Hart	
2024	Nominated	AACTA Awards	Best Direction in Drama or Comedy	The Lost Flowers of Alice Hart	
2024	Won	AACTA Awards	Best Miniseries	The Lost Flowers of Alice Hart	
