= Erin French =

American chef

Erin French is an American chef and author. She is the owner of The Lost Kitchen, a renowned 40-seat restaurant in Freedom, Maine.

She was a semifinalist for James Beard Award for Best Chefs in America in 2016, 2018, 2019, and 2020. In November 2024, Erin interviewed celebrity chef Ina Garten in connection with Ina's book tour at the historic Boston Symphony Orchestra.

The Lost Kitchen is a TV Series on Magnolia Network.

== Books ==
- Finding Freedom: A Cook's Story; Remaking a Life from Scratch. Celadon Books. 2021.
- Big Heart Little Stove: Bringing Home Meals & Moments from The Lost Kitchen. Celadon Books. 2023.
- The Lost Kitchen: Recipes and a Good Life Found in Freedom, Maine: A Cookbook. Clarkson Potter. 2017.
