= Samantha Strauss =

Australian screenwriter

- Born: Gold Coast, Queensland, Australia
- Occupation: Screenwriter
- Writing career
- Language: English
- Notable works: Dance Academy; H_{2}O: Just Add Water
- Notable awards: Logie Award; International Emmy Award nomination

Samantha Strauss is a multi-Logie award winning Australian screenwriter known for the shows Dance Academy, Nine Perfect Strangers and Apple Cider Vinegar.

== Early life and family ==
Strauss grew up in Gold Coast, Queensland, and was educated at St Hilda's School, Trinity Lutheran College and Bond University, where she studied Film and Television. She also trained in professional ballet on the Gold Coast, before a fractured back injury forced her to change directions.

== Screenwriting career ==
Samantha Strauss is the co-creator and head writer of the 65-part ABC teen drama series Dance Academy. In 2011 the series won the Australian Logie for Most Outstanding Children's Drama and was nominated for an International Emmy Award in the Children and Young People category.

On 22 September 2020, See-Saw Films launched production company Picking Scabs jointly with Strauss.

She created the 2020 Showcase and Sky Atlantic series The End about three generations of family trying their best to navigate how to live meaningfully and die with dignity. The inspiration for the show came from Strauss's experience watching her grandmother go through life changes after moving into a retirement village she thought she would hate.

She was a writer on the 2021 Hulu series Nine Perfect Strangers, based on the novel by Australian writer Liane Moriarty.

Strauss created the Logie award winning 2025 Netflix series Apple Cider Vinegar about the convicted scammer and health influencer Belle Gibson. She was shortlisted for Betty Roland Prize for Scriptwriting, NSW Premier's Literary Awards, for episode 1.

Strauss adapted Liane Moriarty's novel The Last Anniversary for Binge which premiered in 2025.

== Filmography ==
=== Film ===
- Mary: The Making of a Princess (2015) (writer)
- Dance Academy: The Movie (2017) (writer)
- Penguin Bloom (2020) (additional writing)
- The Dry (2020) (additional writing)
- Christmas on the Farm (2021) (additional writing)

=== Television ===
Year	Title	Creator	Writer	Executive Producer	Notes
2010	H_{2}O: Just Add Water	No	Yes	No	
2010-2013	Dance Academy	Yes	Yes	No	
2013	Offspring	No	Yes	No	
2013-2015	Wonderland	No	Yes	No	
2017	The Wrong Girl	No	Yes	Script producer	
2018	The New Legends of Monkey	No	Yes	No	
2020	The End	Yes	Yes	Yes	
2021	Nine Perfect Strangers	No	Yes	Yes	
2025	Apple Cider Vinegar	Yes	Yes	Yes	
2025	The Last Anniversary	Yes	Yes	Yes	
TBA	Grown Ups †	Yes	Yes	Yes	
