= Doctors and Nurses (film) =

- Directed by: Maurice Murphy
- Written by: Morris Gleitzman; Doug Edwards; Robn Moase; Tony Sheldon; Maurice Murphy
- Based on: an original idea by Maurice Murphy
- Produced by: Brian Rosen
- Starring: Pamela Stephenson; Bert Newton; Richard Meikle; Graeme Blundell
- Cinematography: John Seale
- Music by: Mike Harvey
- Distributed by: Classic Films
- Release date: 1981
- Country: Australia
- Language: English
- Budget: A$400,000

Doctors and Nurses is a 1981 Australian comedy film directed by Maurice Murphy. The gimmick is child actors play doctors and nurses and adults play patients.

== Cast ==
- Pamela Stephenson as Permanent Wave
- Bert Newton as Mr. Cody
- Richard Meikle as The President
- Graeme Blundell as Mr. X
- Drew Forsythe as Katz
- Andrew McFarlane as Milligan
- Sarah Lambert as Mary Grey

== Reception ==
FilmInk magazine later said "I’ve got to say, I used to watch this on VHS when I was eight and remember loving it. I haven’t seen it since I was eight. Amazing cast."

== Horror Movie and Goose Flesh ==
After making the movie, Maurice Murphy and Brian Rosen decided to make a follow-up project, shooting two films back to back, Horror Movie and Goose Flesh, budgeted at $500,000 each. The movie had the same plot line but Horror Movie was a straight film, whereas Goose Flesh was a comedy. The same cast and crew were used.

Filming started in Sydney in April 1981. A scene would be shot straight then re-shot as a comedy. However, the film ran out of money and filming stopped after a week. Brian Rosen was left with $700,000 debt.
