= Sarah Lambert =

Australian actress, writer, director and producer

- Occupations: Director, writer, producer, actress
- Known for: Lambs of God; Heartbreak High; A Country Practice; Love Child
- Children: 2
- Family: Anne-Louise Lambert (sister)

Sarah Lambert (born 1970) is an Australian writer, director and producer, working primarily in television.

== Early life ==
Lambert grew up with two older brothers, Tony and Andrew, and an older sister, actress Anne-Louise Lambert, known for her role as Miranda in the 1975 classic film Picnic at Hanging Rock. When their parents split up in the mid-1970s, Lambert moved to the inner-Sydney suburb of Balmain with her mother and siblings.

== Career ==
Lambert had a recurring role as Sandy on television soap opera A Country Practice, playing Jo Loveday's best friend, Sandy Crosby from 1986 to 1989. She starred in drama series Heartbreak High as teacher Christina Milano in 1994.

She made guest appearances in Spring & Fall, Bellamy, E Street, Rafferty's Rules, Police Rescue, G.P. and Medivac as well as featuring in the miniseries Against the Wind (1978) and Scales of Justice (1983). She also appeared in the films Doctors and Nurses (1981), Fluteman (1982) and The Roly Poly Man (1994). Lambert retired from acting in 2002, starting a career as a documentary filmmaker, followed by a television writer and show runner.

Lambert was the creator of the Nine Network television drama series Love Child, which she also wrote and produced. It aired from 2014 to 2019 and over its four seasons, received 20 award nominations, including Best Miniseries at the AWGIE Awards, Best Television Drama Series at the AACTA Awards, and Best Drama Program at the Logie Awards twice.

Lambert is the writer and showrunner of the 2019 television adaptation of the Marele Day novel Lambs of God for Lingo Pictures and Foxtel. The miniseries stars Ann Dowd, Jessica Barden and Essie Davis. The series received eighteen AACTA nominations. It was nominated for Best Screenplay at the 2019 AACTA Awards as well as being nominated for Best Television Series or Miniseries at the 2019 AWGIEs. It also won at the 2019 Screen Producers Awards for Best Miniseries.

In 2022, Lambert was writer and an executive producer on an adaptation of Markus Zusak’s novel, The Messenger.

Lambert was also the showrunner of the 2023 Amazon Prime Video miniseries, The Lost Flowers of Alice Hart, based on the novel by Holly Ringland. Starring Sigourney Weaver, it was Amazon Prime’s most successful Australian Original series worldwide, with the biggest opening weekend viewership globally for an Australian launch. The series was nominated for twelve AACTAs, winning Best Miniseries. Lambert was recognised for an AWGIE nomination for Best Screenplay in a Limited Series. Lambert's work on the episode "Black Fire Orchid" also earned her a Highly Commended nod at the NSW Premier's Literary Awards.

Lambert's other writing credits include episodes for award-winning shows The Doctor Blake Mysteries, A Place to Call Home, and Dance Academy. For the latter, she was nominated for Best Children’s Screenplay at the AWGIE Awards. She also co-created the 2002 U.K. series Aliens Among Us, writing and directing over thirty episodes. Her U.S. credits include Clone Story, God In Government, 14 Million Dreams, New Type of Jazz and The Play's The Thing for PBS. She received an Emmy nomination for the latter.

She runs her own production company, Lantern Pictures, which was launched in 2023.

== Personal life ==
Lambert is married to husband Peter Frost and they have a daughter and a son.

== Acting credits ==
=== Films ===
Year	Title	Role	Notes
1981	Doctors and Nurses	Mary Grey	
1982	Fluteman	Jane	
1994	The Roly Poly Man	Vicki Lane	
1996	Hey Amigos	Chicciolina	Short film
2002	Turtle Monkey	Jana	Short film

=== Television ===
Year	Title	Role	Notes
1978	Against the Wind	Elizabeth Wiltshire	Miniseries
1980	Spring & Fall	Debra	
1981	Bellamy	Cassie	Miniseries
1983	Scales of Justice		Miniseries
1986–1989	A Country Practice	Sandy Crosby	
1989	E Street	Elizabeth Kennedy	
1990	Rafferty's Rules	Rudi Apps	
1991	Police Rescue	Juliet	
1991–1993	Uncle Jack and the Dark Side of the Moon	Kate	
1993	G.P.	Leah White	
1994	Heartbreak High	Christina Milano	Season 1, episodes 1–26
1995	Eat My Shorts		
1997	Medivac	Francine Lord	1 episode

== Writing / directing credits ==
=== Film ===
Year	Title	Role	Notes
1992	Come Fly with Me	Writer / Director	Short film
2006	Photograph	Writer / Director	Short film

=== Television ===
Year	Title	Role	Notes
1996	City Arts – The Play's the Thing	Writer / Director	Documentary
2000	Last Chance for Peace: Sierra Leone	Writer	Documentary
2001	14 Million Dreams	Producer	Documentary
2002	Clone Story	Writer	TV film
2002	Aliens Among Us	Co-creator / Writer (17 episodes) / Director (26 episodes)	
2004	God in Government	Writer	TV film
2005	The Alice	Writer	Miniseries, episode 14
2005	God in Government	Writer / Co-Director	Documentary
2006	Clone Story	Writer / Director	Documentary
2006	Love My Way	Writer (1 episode) / Script Editor (13 episodes)	Season 2
2007	All Saints	Writer	Season 10, episode 26: "Under the Skin"
2008	Resistance	Writer	
2010; 2012	Dance Academy	Writer	Season 1 & 2, 2 episodes
2014–2017	Love Child	Creator / Writer / Producer	36 episodes
2015	A Place to Call Home	Writer	Season 3, episode 6: "In the Heat of the Night"
2016	The Doctor Blake Mysteries	Writer	Season 4, episode 7: "For Whom the Bell Tolls"
2019	Lambs of God	Writer / Showrunner / Producer	Miniseries, 4 episodes
2023	The Lost Flowers of Alice Hart	Writer / Showrunner	Miniseries, 7 episodes
2023	The Messenger	Writer / Executive Producer	Miniseries, 3 episodes

== Awards and nominations ==
Year	Work	Award	Category	Result
1996	The Play's The Thing	Emmy Awards		Nominated
2006	The Alice (episode 14)	Queensland Premier's Literary Awards		Nominated
2010	Dance Academy	AWGIE Awards	Best Children's Television	Nominated
2019	Lambs of God	AWGIE Awards	Best Television Series or Miniseries of 4 hours or less	Nominated
2019	Lambs of God	AACTA Awards	Best Miniseries	Won
2019	Lambs of God (episode 1: "The Devil into Paradise")	AACTA Awards	Best Screenplay in Television	Nominated
2019	Lambs of God	Screen Producers Australia Awards	Television or Miniseries Production of the Year	Won
2024	The Lost Flowers of Alice Hart	AWGIE Awards	Best Television – Limited Series	Nominated
2024	The Lost Flowers of Alice Hart	AACTA Awards	Best Miniseries	Won
2024	The Lost Flowers of Alice Hart (episode: "Black Fire Orchid")	NSW Premier's Literary Awards		Highly Commended
