= Bradley Trevor Greive =

Australian author (born 1970)

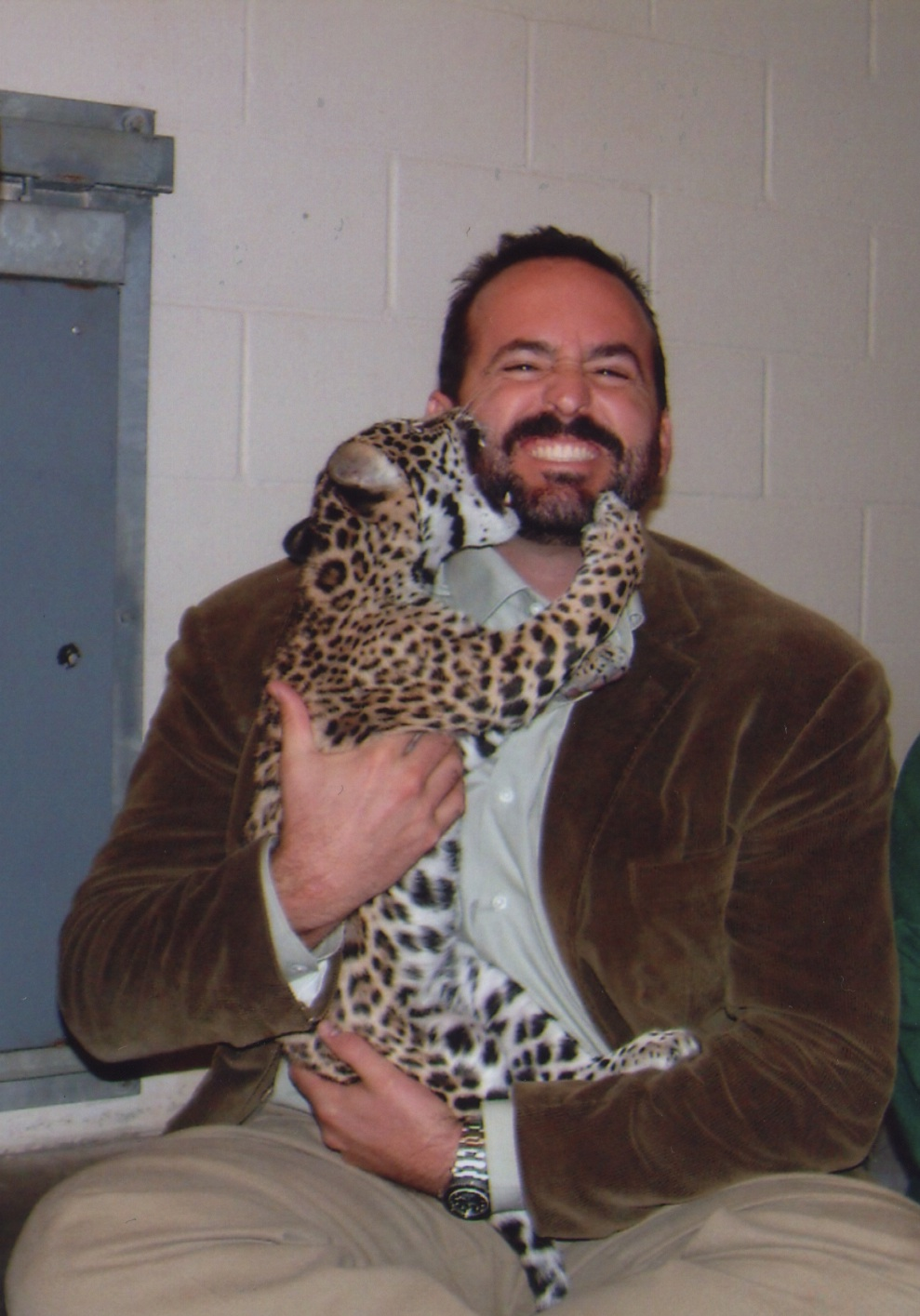
- Greive posing with a jaguar cub
- Born: Bradley Trevor Greive; 22 February 1970 (age 56); Hobart, Tasmania, Australia
- Occupations: Author, artist, naturalist, writer, actor, adventure sportsman, radio and television personality
- Years active: 1993–present
- Spouse: Amy Greive
- Website: http://www.btgstudios.com

Signature
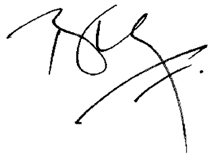

Bradley Trevor Greive AM (born 22 February 1970) is an Australian author. He has written 24 books which have been translated into 27 languages, and have been sold in 115 countries, several of which have appeared in the New York Times bestseller list. Greive's work has won multiple awards worldwide and has sold more than 25 million copies. He lives mostly in Tasmania, Alaska and California.

== Early life and career ==
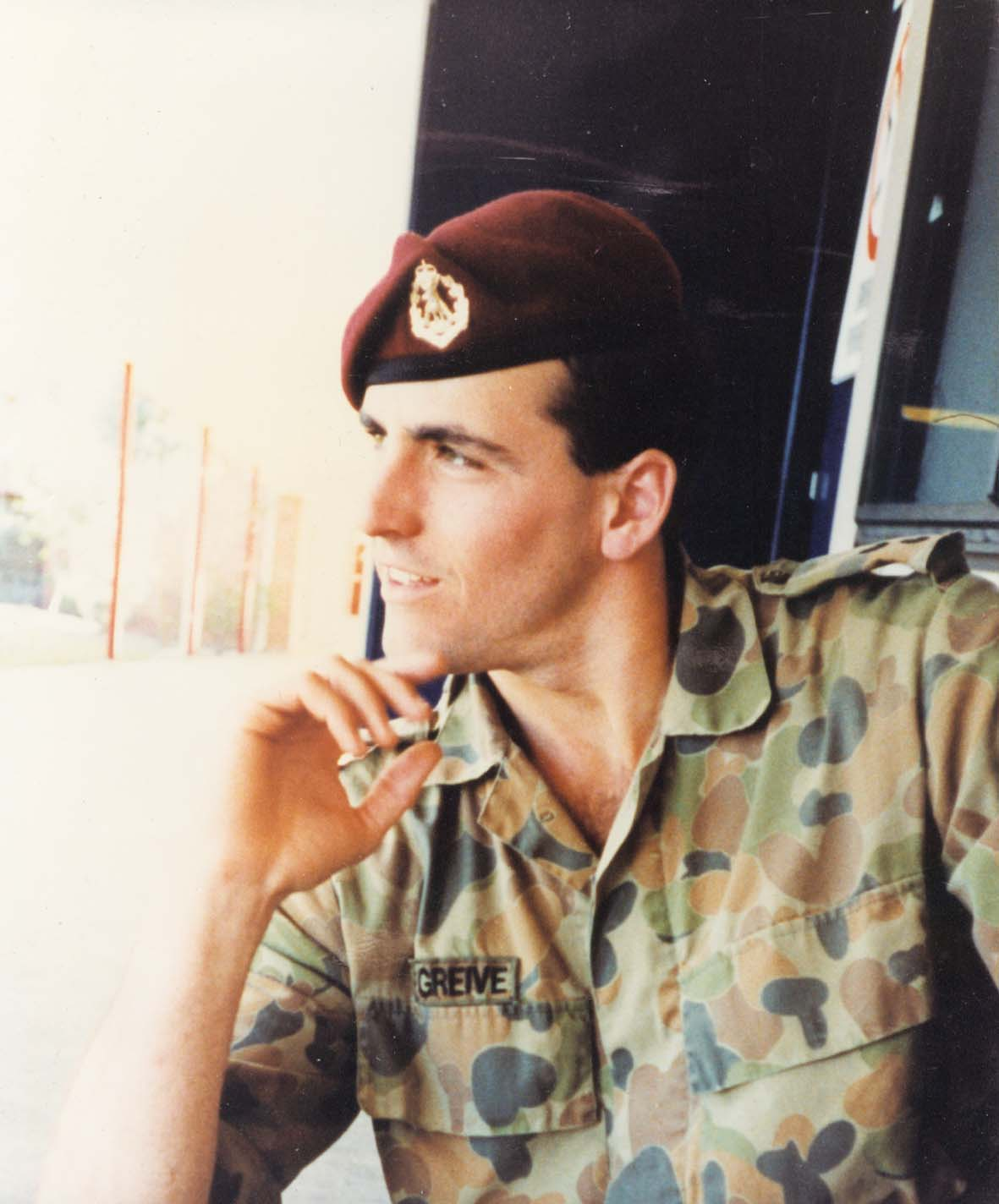
Greive was a paratrooper until 1993.

Greive was born in Hobart, Tasmania to Dr Trevor Colin Greive and Nita Fay Greive, and spent his childhood living with his parents and sisters in numerous countries across Europe and Asia. He returned to Australia in 1979 to finish his schooling at Tweed Valley College in Murwillumbah, where he was awarded Dux in 1988.

Greive joined the Australian Army after leaving high school and underwent training at the Royal Military College Duntroon in Canberra. Whilst an undergraduate at RMC Duntroon, Greive undertook a military exchange with the Royal Thai Military Academy, during which he toured Thai/Cambodian border military installations and refugee camps. Upon graduation as a commissioned officer (Lieutenant) Greive was posted to the 3rd Battalion of the Royal Australian Regiment (Para), and assumed command of 1st Platoon, Alpha Company – a paratroop combat rifle platoon. Greive's specialist combat qualifications include: Airborne Operations, Air Mobile Operations, Survival, Mine Warfare & Anti Handling Devices (Instructor), Heavy Weapons – Direct Fire Weapons, Anti-Armour, Heavy Machine Guns (Instructor). He continued to serve in this capacity until 1993, when he left the military due to a tropical respiratory infection that led to asthma.

Greive subsequently worked across several creative fields (including media such as television, radio and published cartoons) before his debut as a successful author in 2000, which led to the inception of BTG Studios, followed by The Lost Bear Company and the uptake of several creative projects.

== Creative career ==
=== Publishing ===
Greive rose to prominence as an author in 2000 with the release of his hugely successful The Blue Day Book, a collection of amusing animal photos and inspirational text designed to "lift the spirits of anyone who has got the blues." Since then he has published 24 books and has won numerous awards for his work, including the ABA Book of the Year Award (2000), the APA Best Designed Children's Non-fiction Book Award (2003) and numerous #1 placings in bestseller lists across the world. Greive's books have been published on 6 continents and have sold in excess of 25 million copies to date. In late 2013, Greive purchased the English language gift-book rights to Bertrand Russell's seminal essay, 'In Praise of Idleness'.

=== Television and radio ===
In 1996, Greive became a creative consultant and writer for Godfrey Bigot's weekly political sketches on Channel 7's Today Tonight, and went on to pursue a similar role in 1997 with MTV Australia. In 1998, Greive collaborated with Kapow Pictures to write and direct an animated short for Nickelodeon called Agent Green, and a short film called Show & Tell which won the Comgraph Animation Gold Award, the Tellrude Film Festival Best Short Film Award, the Danish International 3D Award, and was nominated for an AFI Award for Best Short Animation.

In 2007 he wrote, produced and hosted The World According to Bradley Trevor Greive on Tasmania's community radio station Star FM.

Greive has formed a close relationship with ABC Radio and Television, appearing on numerous programs over the past decade, including Stateline, ABC National News, ABC Radio National Night Club, and an appearance on Creature Features with his pet rabbit, Biff.

On 21 April 2007, Greive read his poem "Welcome to the East Coast (After the Fire)", during the live broadcast from the ABC 'Back to St Helens' concert to acknowledge the heroic efforts of the East Coast community who rallied together during the devastating forest fires of December 2006.

Over December 2009 and January 2010, Greive presented ABC Radio National Evenings (hosted by Christopher Lawrence) with his 'E-Mail From America' – a weekly series of eclectic and humorous reports from Florida, USA. The title of Greive's program was a tongue in cheek homage to the late Alistair Cooke's Letter From America, "a weekly 15-minute radio series on BBC Radio 4, previously called the Home Service, which ran for 2,869 shows from 24 March 1946, to 20 February 2004, making it the longest-running speech radio program in history. The program was also broadcast for many years on the BBC World Service."

Greive and Christopher Lawrence teamed up again, this time on ABC Classic FM, over Monday, 5 April 2010 to co-host "The Life Changers", the finale of First Time Classics, a publicly voted classical music showcase, produced by Marian Arnold.

In 2013 and 2014 Greive made five appearances as the resident wildlife expert on E!'s late-night comedy talk-show Chelsea Lately. In 2014 Greive also appeared as the resident wildlife expert on The Late Late Show with Craig Ferguson on CBS.

An adult animated television series titled Adventure Beast and featuring Greive was released on Netflix on October 22, 2021.

=== Stage ===
In 2007 Greive produced two sell-out performances of An Intimate Evening with John Cleese – starring John Cleese and featuring Richard Morecroft, one with Paul Chesher and 4D Events.

On 4 January 2013, Greive joined celebrated primatologist Dame Jane Goodall, along with fellow wildlife conservationist and American screen legend Betty White, on stage at the Warner Grand Theater, in San Pedro, California, to raise money for the Jane Goodall Institute.

In 2016 Greive rewrote Ogden Nash's humorous verse for The Carnival of the Animals (Le carnaval des animaux) for an all-Australian themed production of Camille Saint-Saens's classic work performed by the Tasmanian Symphony Orchestra, entitled The (Australian) Carnival of the Animals.

=== Cartoons ===
Shortly after retiring from his career as a paratrooper in 1993, Greive worked in several entry-level positions in the advertising, modelling and service industries which he has described as "creatively enlightening". In 1994 Greive went on to become the youngest feature cartoonist at the Sydney Morning Herald, and launched a series of cartoons known as Fate which featured in the Manly Art Gallery and Museum Newsletter. Greive continued to explore his graphical creativity in 1995 with the launch of the Bradley Trevor Greive Cartoon Series in the Sydney Morning Herald. Greive's work was later exhibited at the Museum of Contemporary Art, Sydney in 1997. In 2011 Greive launched 'The Lost Bear', a single panel cartoon series on Go Comics, the world's most popular online comic site. Go Comics currently generates over 70,000,000-page views per month and belongs to Universal Uclick, the world's largest independent syndicate.

=== Walt Disney Imagineering ===
Since 2010 Greive has twice been the Executive Creative Consultant in Residence for Walt Disney Imagineering's elite Blue Sky creative think-tank. He has also returned to WDI to lecture on 'The Nature of Creativity' on two occasions, and continues to have close professional ties with a number of key creative divisions within the world's largest media conglomerate.

=== International representation ===
In late 2013 Greive signed with the United Talent Agency, who now represent him for film, stage, radio, lectures and television work. As an author, and for all his publishing endeavours Greive continues to be represented by Al Zuckerman, the founder of Writers House, New York.

== Wildlife conservation and other activities ==
Greive has supported numerous conservation, arts and literacy initiatives and projects around the world, and presently holds the following offices: Founding Governor – The Taronga Foundation, Chairman – The Taronga Foundation Poetry Prize, Life Benefactor – Durrell Wildlife Conservational Trust (Jersey), Patron – Painted Dog Conservation Inc (Africa), International Conservation Ambassador – Fort Worth Zoo (USA), Council Member of the Australian Youth Orchestra, Board Member – Australia Poetry Centre, Ambassador – Dymocks Literacy Foundation.

In 2002 Greive teamed up with famed Japanese wildlife photographer, Mitsuaki Iwago, to produce a book on biodiversity entitled Priceless – The Vanishing Beauty of a Fragile Planet. Greive donated all his author royalties to the Taronga Foundation, an Australasian wildlife conservation charity. The book has inspired numerous people to take positive action in regards to wildlife conservation, including British filmmaker, Steve Piper, who went on to make an acclaimed documentary about critically endangered Scottish Wildcats.

In 2004 Greive qualified for the Russian space program by completing testing and basic training at the Yuri Gagarin Cosmonaut Training Center in Moscow, and in 2006 won the French Polynesian Ha'a'piti Rock lifting championships.

On 24 October 2013 Greive attended the official opening of the Tasmanian Devil exhibit at the San Diego Zoo in his capacity as both a Tasmanian representative and also as Governor of Taronga Western Plains Zoo; the Taronga Conservation Society Australia facility that provided the Tasmanian Devils for this international conservation education partnership.

== National honors ==
In 2014 Greive was appointed a Member of the Order of Australia for his significant service to literature and wildlife conservation.

== Personal life ==
Despite his many media appearances, Greive is known to be a very private person: a "self-described cave bear by nature, who equates publicity to 'being stoned to death with toffee apples'". He currently lives on a remote farm on the East Coast of Tasmania, Australia and has never allowed media onto his property.

In 2011, Greive temporarily relocated to Costa Rica to work on a new book entitled The Obsequious Parrot.

Since 2010, Greive has been in a romantic relationship with American architect Amy Melin. They were married in June 2015.

In 2013, Greive temporarily relocated to Alaska to research an as yet untitled book about brown bears and Tlingit culture.

Greive's hobbies and interest include sky-diving, desert racing, scuba diving, wildlife, adventure travel, art, cooking, science, and reading. Greive has said his favourite authors include Joseph Heller, Douglas Adams, and Gerald Durrell, and his favourite painter is Philip Guston. Other historical figures Greive admires include Richard Feynman, Jacques Cousteau, Howard Carter, Robert Goddard, Marie Curie, Yuri Gagarin, Erwin Rommel, David Lynch and David Sterling. Greive has been quoted as saying his favourite fictional character is "the lace-making, latently heroic Beaver from Lewis Carroll's Hunting of the Snark".

== Published works ==
- The Blue Day Book (2000)
- The Meaning of Life (2001)
- Dear Mom (2001)
- Looking for Mr Right (2001)
- Priceless: the Vanishing Beauty of a Fragile Planet (2002)
- The Incredible Truth About Mothers (2003)
- Tomorrow (2003)
- The Book for People Who Do Too Much (2004)
- Friends to the End (2004)
- Dear Dad (2005)
- The Simple Truth about Love (2005)
- The Blue Day Book for Kids (2005)
- A Teaspoon of Courage (2006)
- Dieting Causes Brain Damage (2006)
- Friends to the End for Kids (2006)
- Every Day is Christmas (2007)
- A Teaspoon of Courage for Kids (2007)
- Thank You for Being You (2008)
- I'm Sorry... My Bad! (2008)
- Why Dogs Are Better Than Cats (2009)
- Curses and Blessings for All Occasions (2012)
- Penguin Bloom (2016)
- Broken Girl (2024)
