= Holly Ringland =

Australian author

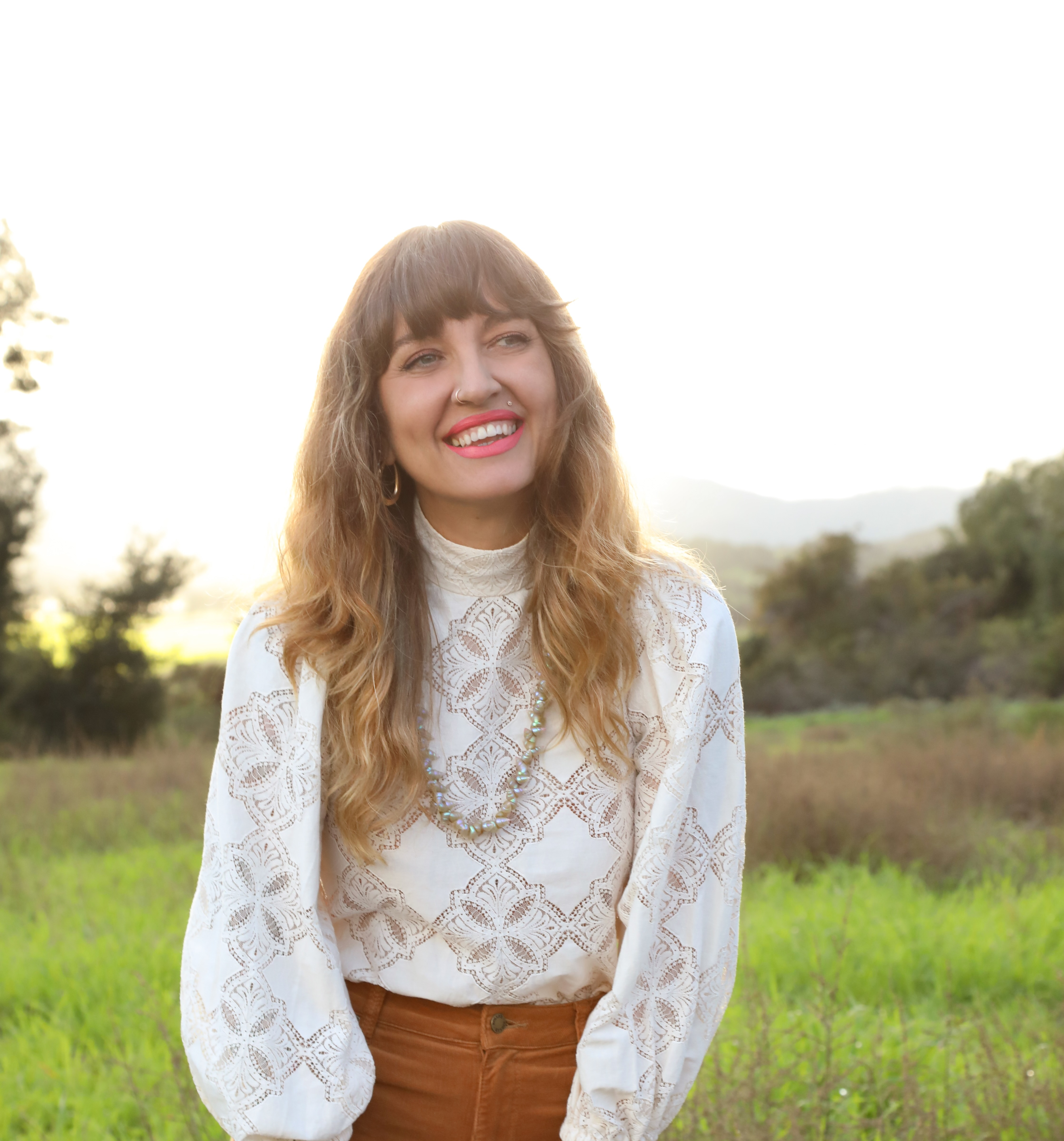
Holly Ringland in 2024

Holly Ringland is an Australian author and TV presenter. She is best known for her 2018 novel The Lost Flowers of Alice Hart, which won the 2019 General Fiction Book of the Year Award at the Australian Book Industry Awards, and was adapted into a television miniseries in 2023.

== Early life ==
Ringland was born and raised in South East Queensland, spending most of her childhood in the care of her single mother, Colleen, who worked as a school teacher. When she was nine, her family relocated to North America, renting a home in Vancouver and traveling extensively between national parks in both Canada and the US for two years.

== Career ==
Prior to becoming a writer, Ringland held various jobs in Australia including hospitality, data entry, call centre work and temporary work. She went to Canada on a working visa in her 20's, then after returning to Australia obtained a job at Uluru-Kata Tjuta National Park, using poetry in her successful written application for the position. Ringland reports leaving the area to escape from a domestic violence relationship. She used her life savings to relocate to the UK in 2009, where she studied a master's degree in creative writing at Manchester University.

Her first novel, The Lost Flowers of Alice Hart, was written in Manchester and published in 2018. The book tells the story of Alice Hart, who becomes mute after her mother and her violent father both die, and is taken to her previously unknown grandmother who runs a native Australian flower farm. Ringland states the catalyst for the book was her experience of living with male-perpetrated violence, which had silenced her ambitions for being a writer. The book has been translated into over 30 languages. In 2019, it won the General Fiction Book of the Year award at the Australian Book Industry Awards. In 2023, the book was adapted into a seven-part miniseries of the same name starring Sigourney Weaver and Alycia Debnam-Carey.

In December 2019, Ringland and her partner visited Ringland's mother in Australia for Christmas, though were unable to return home due to travel restrictions during the COVID-19 pandemic. She subsequently lived with her mother and step-father. During this time she co-hosted the ABC TV show Back to Nature, which focused on exploring Australian nature. She also wrote her second book, The Seven Skins of Esther Wilding, despite being separated from her research materials and being unable to visit the locations in her novel for research. The book, which is a fairy tale quest for a missing sister, was published in 2022 to critical acclaim.

In 2023, Ringland published her first non-fiction book, The House That Joy Built, which is about the transformative power of finding joy through creativity. The book draws on Ringland's own personal experiences in confronting things such as imposter syndrome, procrastination and self-doubt, and discusses how she manages those fears and anxieties. The Sydney Morning Herald described it as a "down-to-earth" invitation to people who have wanted to explore their creativity "but for varying reasons don't dare to."

Her novel The World Beneath Her Feet was published by Fourth Estate in 2026. It won the 2026 Dymocks Book of the Year.
