= BookCon =

Fan convention (2014–19)

Coordinates: 40°45′29.4″N 74°00′09.0″W

- Genre: Literary
- Venue: Jacob K. Javits Convention Center (2014–15, 2017–19); McCormick Place (2016)
- Locations: New York City (2014–15, 2017–19); Chicago (2016)
- Country: United States
- Inaugurated: 2014
- Most recent: June 1–2, 2019
- Organizer: ReedPop, a division of Reed Exhibitions and Reed Elsevier
- Website: bookcon.com

BookCon is an annual fan convention established in 2014 in New York City. Taking the name format from other fan conventions such as Comic-Con, BookCon was established to combine pop culture and the book industry. Many authors, celebrities and publishing professionals would attend BookCon. In a statement made on December 1, 2020, it was announced that due to the impact of COVID-19 pandemic the convention was canceled for 2021 and would be reworked for the future. In June 2025, Reedpop announced the return of BookCon in April 2026.

== History ==
BookCon was run by ReedPop, which also organizes New York Comic Con, Chicago Comic & Entertainment Expo, Star Wars Celebration, and other events. BookCon was created to boost the image and attendance of long-running book fair BookExpo America.

== Events ==
=== 2014 edition ===
The first BookCon was held on May 31, 2014, at the Jacob K. Javits Convention Center in New York City. On May 30, a sneak preview event was held with the This Is Where I Leave You Q&A panel, featuring author Jonathan Tropper and stars of the film version, Jason Bateman and Tina Fey.

The event featured a panel with best-selling novelist John Grisham. Other writers and stars there for Q&As and autograph signing included Amy Poehler (Yes Please), Martin Short (I Must Say: My Life as a Humble Comedy Legend), Jodi Picoult (Leaving Time), Kathy Reichs (Bones Never Lie), and Ruth Reichl (Delicious!).

Nickelodeon also organized a Dora and Friends storytime for children.

=== 2015 edition ===
The second edition took place on May 30–31 at the Javits Center in New York City. Scheduled authors for the event included James Patterson, Candace Bushnell, Sherman Alexie, Julianne Moore, Aziz Ansari, Mindy Kaling and B. J. Novak. John Hodgman of The Daily Show led a panel discussion with comedian Nick Offerman (Parks and Recreation), whose second book, Gumption: Relighting the Torch of Freedom with America's Gutsiest Troublemakers, was released on May 26, 2015.

=== 2016 edition ===
The third BookCon was held on May 14, 2016 at McCormick Place in Chicago. The event was shortened to one day, which caused complaints from fans that it was too short. About 7,000 people attended the event. Authors at the event included Alexandra Bracken, Khloé Kardashian, Kate DiCamillo, Sherman Alexie and Meg Cabot.

=== 2017 edition ===
The fourth BookCon was held at the Javits Center in New York City. Authors included Dan Brown, Margaret Atwood, Kwame Alexander, Cory Doctorow, Shea Serrano, Rainbow Rowell, Veronica Roth and Soman Chainani. Celebrities at the event include scientist Bill Nye and actors Jeffrey Tambor, Mayim Bialik, Krysten Ritter, Chad Michael Murray and Andrew McCarthy.

=== 2018 edition ===
The fifth BookCon was held at the Javits Center in New York City. Authors included Angie Thomas, Victoria Aveyard, Leigh Bardugo, and Marissa Meyer. Celebrities at the event included Taye Diggs and Zach King.

=== 2019 edition ===
The sixth BookCon was held at the Javits Center in New York City. Authors included Victoria Aveyard, Leigh Bardugo, V.E. Schwab, Marie Lu, Joe Hill, Holly Black, Cassandra Clare, Maggie Stiefvater and Marissa Meyer. Celebrities at the event included Alyssa Milano, John Cena, and Evangeline Lilly.

=== 2020 edition ===
The seventh BookCon was to be held at the Javits Center in New York City, however due to the COVID-19 pandemic, the event was canceled. Instead, BookCon was held virtually as "BookConline," with panels held over Facebook.

=== 2026 edition ===
The next BookCon is to be held at the Javits Center in New York City on April 18-19, 2026.

== See also ==
- Books in the United States
