= Warcross =

2017 novel by Marie Lu

- Author: Marie Lu
- Cover artist: Eileen Savage
- Language: English
- Series: Warcross
- Genre: Science fiction
- Publisher: G.P. Putnam's Sons
- Publication date: September 12, 2017
- Publication place: United States
- Media type: hardcover, paperback, e-book, audiobook
- Pages: 353
- ISBN: 978-0399547966
- Followed by: Wildcard

Warcross is a young adult science fiction novel by Marie Lu, which was published on September 17, 2017 by G.P. Putnam's Sons. Warcross is the first book in the duology of the same name, set in a cyberpunk future, New Yorker 18-year-old Emika Chen works as a "hunter" (a kind of bounty hunter) who earns her living making arrests for minor crimes. She is handpicked by billionaire Hideo Tanaka, creator of the virtual reality combat game Warcross to go to the game's world championship in Tokyo to investigate a security breach.

The sequel, Wildcard, was released on September 18, 2018.

== Plot ==
18-year-old Emika Chen works as a bounty hunter for a living, which entails capturing individuals who are suspected of betting on Warcross, the largest internet game in the world, in which players access a virtual-reality world by wearing a pair of glasses—the Neuro Link— and battle on realistic terrains by using power-ups to take their opponent's Artifact (a gem). While on the hunt for a suspect, Emika is reminded of the upcoming Warcross tournament in Tokyo. This could be seen in the news and in Times Square.

During the first Warcross tournament match, a rare power-up appears. This particular power-up sells for a hefty amount of money, which compels Emika to exploit a vulnerability in the code. Upon using the hack, she glitches into the middle of the tournament match, which confuses both teams and leads to the cancellation of the match. After her unexpected intrusion, Emika rises to stardom. She receives a call from Henka Games, informing her that the game's creator, Hideo Tanaka, intends to fly her out to Tokyo to discuss a job opportunity.

Hideo informs Emika that Warcross has been suffering from the actions of a mysterious hacker, known as Zero, who has managed to enter Warcross' database and access the information of all the spectators at the tournament. Hideo offers her a position as a bounty hunter so that she can help him capture the elusive hacker. Hideo suspects that the hacker is likely a competitor in the tournament. Thus, he signs Emika up for the tournament so that she can spy on her competitors without raising suspicion. In the Wardraft, where wildcards are drafted into teams, Emika is the first player picked and joins Team Phoenix Riders.

Emika becomes wary of one of her teammates, a wildcard called DJ Ren, who has set up a system of shields to encrypt his information. Emika extracts a string of code from the shield, which Hideo suggests is related to the Dark World, a place where people commit crimes through Warcross and their fake persona. There, Emika stumbles upon Ren, placing small bets and conversing with an ominous figure known as Zero. Since the bets are so small, Emika believes them to be a set of coordinates that map out future attacks against Henka Games.

After Emika's team wins their first match, the stadium is plunged into darkness. Emika, fearing that something is amiss, sends a message to Hideo, warning him of a possible attack against him. Hideo escapes unscathed from the attack; however, his colleagues suggest that he should leave Tokyo to avoid further incidents, which he downplays. Emika meets up with him in an attempt to change his convictions; however, Hideo remains steadfast. Nevertheless, he reveals that he has developed feelings for Emika and as a result, discloses that the disappearance of his younger brother, Sasuke, brought about the creation of Warcross and the Neurolink (Virtual Reality glasses), uncovering a hidden layer of Hideo's past. Hideo and Sasuke used to play a game where they hid "eggs," and that's what inspired Hideo to create the game Warcross.

At the start of the next Warcross game, Emika decides to trail Ren; however, Zero suddenly appears in front of her. He offers her an opportunity to work with him to thwart Hideo's plans. She rejects his offer, which makes Zero threaten her about the repercussions of her decision. As the match concludes, images of Emika with Hideo emerge, which stirs the media into a frenzy. When she arrives at her team's dormitory, her teammates Asher, Hammie, and Roshan are infuriated at her due to her actions and get into a heated argument with each other. Although they press her for details, Emika keeps quiet to avoid divulging her secrets. As she walks away from her teammates, an explosion erupts that levels the dormitory.

Emika wakes up in a hospital to find herself surrounded by some of her teammates. As she turns on the television, she finds out that she and Ren have been disqualified from the tournament. Simultaneously, Hideo visits her and informs her that her contract has concluded. Hideo agrees to pay her the sum that he offered for the bounty, but he implores her not to meddle in the Warcross finals. A member from a rival team, Tremaine, sends Emika a video wherein Zero and Ren discuss wreaking havoc on the finals by placing bugged power-ups around the map Undeterred by Hideo's demands, Emika decides to intervene to stymie a disaster.

With the funds from the bounty, Emika buys some power-ups that will help her team win the championship without touching the bugged power-ups. Emika manages to glitch into another tournament match. She deploys the power-ups, which eventually lead her team to victory. As the game concludes, Zero spawns on the map. He vaguely warns Emika of the dangers of Hideo's plans without going into further details.

Emika meets up with Hideo once again, and he divulges the true intentions of Warcross. He mentions that the new contact lenses used as an alternative to the glasses interact with the user's brain. Thus, he will be able to stop individuals who plan on committing a crime. These revelations leave Emika distraught, and she questions the purpose of Warcross altogether. After the meeting, Emika receives a text from Zero, who extends his previous offer to her. She reviews footage from the final and discovers a vulnerability in Zero's code. She learns that Zero turns out to be Sasuke, Hideo's long-lost brother.

== Development and inspiration ==
Before releasing her debut novel Legend in 2011, Lu worked briefly as an intern at Disney Interactive Studios. In the creation process of Warcross, she took particular inspiration from Ready Player One and League of Legends tournaments, stating that "fifty thousand people will pack into the Staples Center to watch the world championships, and that very much influenced the creation of Warcross." For the structure of the Warcross game, Lu compares it to "a mix between Overwatch, Mario Kart, and Quidditch". Lu's characterization of the main protagonist was inspired by her mother's computer skills as a computer scientist, perseverance and determination; however, Lu concedes that Emika shares the same interests and flaws as her.

== Reception ==
The novel was commercially successful and received generally positive reviews. After its release, the novel appeared on The New York Times Best Seller list in the young adult category where it remained for 12 weeks.

The novel received mostly positive reviews, with reviewers praising the seamless transition between plot elements. Some critics took exception to the predictability of some of the plot elements and the shallow relationship between Emika and Hideo.

In her list of the best science fiction books to read in September 2017, Everdeen Mason praised the novel for its quickly developing plot and entertainment value. Moreover, she argued that the novel transcends its young-adult billing, likening it to Neal Stephenson's Snow Crash and Ernest Cline's Ready Player One. Kirkus praised the novel for the romance between Emika and Hideo and the plot which captures the feel of an action movie. Kirkus included Warcross in its list of the best teen science fiction books of 2017.

Feliza Casano of Tor.com was critical in her review of Warcross, citing the monotony of the plot as a hindrance to the overall story. In particular, she took exception with the romance between Emika and Hideo and the disclosure of Zero's identity, believing that these plot elements were too easy to foretell.

== Adaptation rights ==
It was announced in September 2020 that the book rights had been optioned for a TV adaption by Bruna Papandrea's Made Up Stories and John Cameron (Fargo, Legion).
