= Leigh Dragoon =

American comics writer and illustrator

- Born: May 6, 1976 (age 50) Plattsburgh, New York, U.S.
- Areas: Writer, Illustrator

Leigh Dragoon is a professional American comics writer and illustrator.

== Career ==
Leigh Dragoon's work first appeared in Girlamatic, publisher of her urban fantasy webcomic By the Wayside, which won Friends of Lulu's Kimberly Yale Award for Best New Talent in 2006. She contributed art to Sam Kieth's My Inner Bimbo graphic novel. In 2009 she wrote the script for the three-volume HarperCollins/Tokyopop manga series based on Frewin Jones' YA fantasy series The Faerie Path. She also contributed a story to the Fraggle Rock Vol. 1 graphic novel published by Archaia Studios Press in 2010. In 2011 she adapted the script for Richelle Mead's Vampire Academy graphic novel. She also scripted the graphic novel adaptations of Marie Lu's Legend, Prodigy, and Champion YA novels. The adaptations are illustrated by Caravan Studio. She is currently working on a fantasy retelling graphic novel of Little Women by Louisa May Alcott to be published by Oni Press.

== Personal life ==
Dragoon is non-binary and a Reform Jew. She has mentioned having autism, obsessive–compulsive disorder, attention deficit hyperactivity disorder and anxiety.

== Bibliography ==
- My Inner Bimbo (multiple artists, Sam Kieth, Oni Press, 2009, ISBN 978-1-934964-12-5)
- The Faerie Path: Lamia's Revenge #1: The Serpent Awakens (artist Alison Acton, HarperCollins/Tokyopop, 2009, ISBN 978-0-06-145694-7)
- The Faerie Path: Lamia's Revenge #2: The Memory of Wings (artist Alison Acton, HarperCollins/Tokyopop, 2009, ISBN 978-0-06-145695-4)
- Fraggle Rock (multiple contributors, Archaia Studios Press, 2010, ISBN 978-1-932386-42-4)
- Vampire Academy (artist Emma Vieceli, Razorbill, 2011, ISBN 978-1-59514-429-4)
- Frostbite (artist Emma Vieceli, Razorbill, 2012, ISBN 978-1595144300)
- Shadow Kiss (artist Emma Vieceli, Razorbill, 2013, ISBN 978-1595144317)
- Legend (artist Caravan Studio, Penguin Group LLC, 2015, ISBN 978-0399171895)
- Prodigy (artist Caravan Studio, Penguin Group LLC, 2016, ISBN 978-0399171901)
- Champion (artist Caravan Studio, Penguin Group LLC, 2017, ISBN 978-0451534347)
- Epic Tales from Adventure Time: Queen of Rogues, 2014. Penguin Random House. 26 June 2014. ISBN 978-0698171961.
- Epic Tales from Adventure Time: The Lonesome Outlaw, 2015. Penguin Random House. 29 September 2015. ISBN 978-0399540110.
- Epic Tales from Adventure Time: The Virtue of Ardor, 2016. Penguin Random House. 28 June 2016. ISBN 978-0451532886.
- Little Women: Magic in Concord (forthcoming, Oni Press)
