= Jamie Costa =

American actor (born 1990)

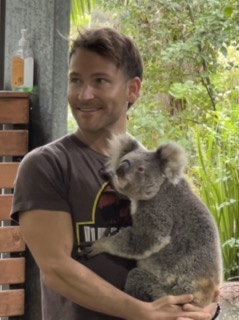
- Jamie Costa at the Currumbin Wildlife Sanctuary, Australia in 2022
- Born: James Edward Costa; May 12, 1990 (age 36); Charleston, South Carolina, U.S.
- Occupations: Actor; producer
- Years active: 2013–present

James Edward Costa (born May 12, 1990) is an American actor. He gained international attention for his impersonation of Robin Williams. He made his film debut in the crime-thriller film, Bring Him to Me.

== Early life ==
Jamie Costa was born on May 12, 1990, and grew up in Charleston, South Carolina. He attended private Christian schools up until high school when he was sent to a military boarding school in Virginia where he ended up graduating highest-ranking cadet. He briefly attended college at The Citadel and eventually ended up studying theater at North Greenville University in South Carolina. He took a semester to study film in Los Angeles, and then finally graduated in December 2013. He also has a brother named Caleb.

== Career ==
Starting in 2015, Costa began posting impersonations on YouTube, including Robin Williams, Ian McKellen, Owen Wilson, Matthew McConaughey, and Harrison Ford.

In July 2015, Costa moved to LA to continue his career in acting and filmmaking and has since appeared in various film and television projects both on screen and as a voice over artist. He has produced and acted in Star Wars fan films hosted on his YouTube channel.

In 2017, Costa played supporting roles in the feature film Heaven Bound, and on the TV show, My Crazy Ex. In 2018, he played a supporting role in the movie Funny Story and the Price of Fame TV series. Costa played a soldier in the 2020 B-rated film, Robot Riot.

In 2021, Costa posted a five-minute piece titled "ROBIN Test Footage Scene" to YouTube. The video shows Williams, played by Costa, in his trailer preparing for an episode of Mork & Mindy. His co-star Pam Dawber (portrayed by Sarah Murphree) brings news of John Belushi's death, prompting an emotional reaction from Williams. The video received several million views. USA Today and The Independent both called his imitation of Williams "uncanny".

In 2022, in an interview with Silver Screen magazine, Costa announced that he will have a guest role as young Kurt Russell on one of the episodes for the Netflix adult animated series: Agent Elvis starring Matthew McConaughey as Elvis. He also starred in a short film titled The Cowboy & the Samurai with director and writer, Jake Lewis.

Costa made his theatrical debut in the 2023 feature Australian film Bring Him to Me, a crime thriller alongside actors Barry Pepper and Sam Neill.

In 2024, he was originally going to voice The Grandmaster in the third season of What If...? but was replaced by actor and comedian, Matt Friend. He also starred as Agent Richard Beckett in the pilot episode of the independent web-series, Zack In Time.

Costa announced on his YouTube community tab page that he would star in the 2024 horror film Scurry alongside newcomer Australian RnB artist, Emalia. Scurry was Costa's first one-shot film. The film had its world premiere at the 2024 Sydney Sci-fi Film Festival. It released in limited theatres in the U.S. on October 2, 2025, and was released on digital, on November 5.

In 2025, he had a role in the independent comedy horror film, Zombie Apache as Sheriff Hatfield who finds out that a greedy real estate developer has desecrated a sacred Viking burial ground, unleashing a comical nightmare upon the unsuspecting locals. The film released on November 8, 2025, on Amazon Prime.

=== Upcoming projects ===
Currently in post-production, Costa will be portraying Herman Schultz / Shocker ll in the upcoming web series Spider Man and the Monsters of Manhattan after it was previously announced to be released in 2021.

Costa will also star in the action-supernatural film, Fight For Your Life with director Luke Sparke alongside Entourage star, Jeremy Piven set to release on an undisclosed date.

In 2025, on a live stream on his YouTube channel, Costa revealed he was recording voiceover work for his first feature length animation film. Costa also announced that he will also doing voice work for a major video game project. The video game project has yet to be revealed.

On November 17, Costa revealed that he would have a voice role in his first animated feature-length film in Brad Bird's neo-noir science fiction film, Ray Gunn which will release in 2026 on Netflix.

Costa has also announced other entertainment projects in the works such as the film, The Nearly Forgotten Incident, & Home Solo, a star wars stop-motion fan film.

== Filmography ==
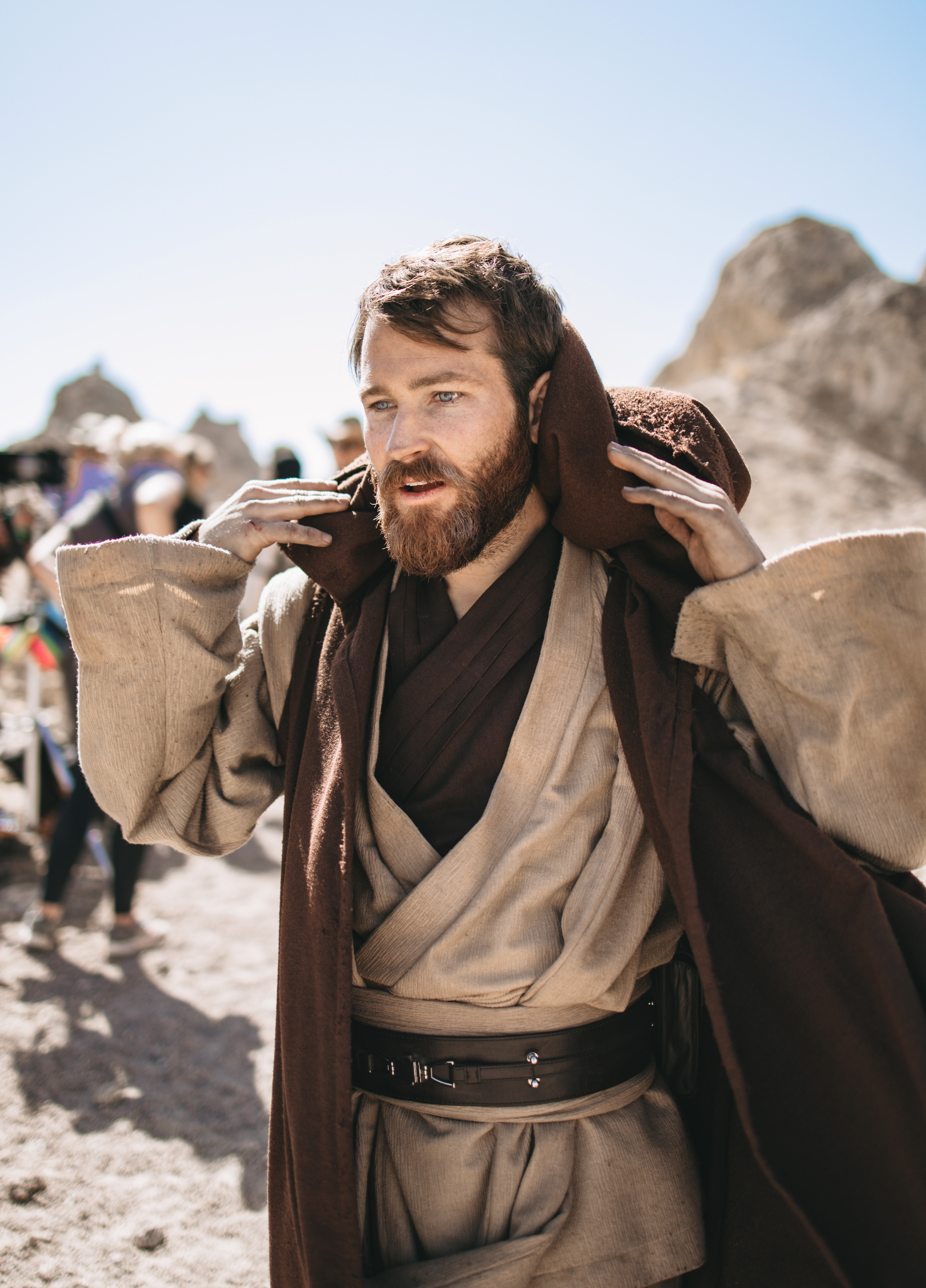
Costa on the set of Kenobi: A Star Wars Fan Film in 2019

=== Film ===
Key
†	Denotes films that have not yet been released

Year	Title	Role	Notes
2017	Heaven Bound	Curt	Direct to DVD
2018	Funny Story	Waiter	Extra
2019	Zeroville	Additional voices	Feature film
2020	Robot Riot	Peterson	Supporting
2023	Bring Him to Me	Jake the Passenger	Feature film
2023	The Activated Man	Ors Gabriel	Feature film
2024	Scurry	Mark	Feature film
2025	Zombie Apache	Sheriff Hatfield	Feature film
2026	Ray Gunn		Voice only

=== Short film ===
Year	Title	Role	Notes
2013	Wolverine	Logan	Fan film
2013	Shifter	TV Host/TV Chef	Short film Also director
2014	Take a Deep Breath	Pizarro	Short film Voice only
2014	Shadows of Man	Man	Short film
2015	Cures Anything	Cash	Short film
2016	We Can't Die	Richard West	Short film
2016	Han Solo: A Smuggler's Trade	Han Solo	Fan film
2018	A Magician Home Alone	Harv	Short film
2018	Deadpool The Musical 2 - Ultimate Disney Parody	Iron Man (voice)	Fan film
2018	Jurassic World: Exodus	Neal "Doc"	Fan film
2019	KENOBI: A Star Wars Story	Obi-Wan "Ben" Kenobi	Fan film
2019	Star Wars: Origins	Walter	Fan film
2021	Batman: Dying Is Easy	Jervis Tetch / Mad Hatter	Fan film
2021	Robin	Robin Williams	Test footage
2022	Defiance: A Joker Fan Film	Voice of Joker	Fan film
2023	The Cowboy and The Samurai	Jack Nicholson	Short film
2023	Outpost	Sager/The Thief	Short film
2025	Hivemind Deluxe	Chip	Short film

=== Television ===
Year	Title	Role	Notes
2015	Jimmy's Books	Jimmy / Cool Robot / Director	Voice only
2015	The 3rd Annual Geekie Awards	Marty McFly	TV movie
2015	Schmoes Know Movie Show	Himself	Episode 213
2016	Making an Impression	Himself	Documentary
2016	Caught on Camera with Nick Cannon	Himself	#2.3
2017	My Crazy Ex	Billy	#4.11
2017	The Inspectors	Duncan Soto	#2.16 (Guest Appearance)
2018	The Price of Fame	Patrick Swayze	#1.5
2023	Agent Elvis	Kurt Russell	Voice role; 1 episode
2023	The Beech Boys	FBI Agent Ashley	7 episodes

=== Web series ===
Key
†	Denotes television productions that have not yet been released

Year	Title	Role	Notes
2019	How It Should Have Ended	The Genie	Voice role; 2 episodes
2024	Zack In Time	Agent Richard Beckett	Voice role
TBA	Marvel Adventures: Spider-Man and the Monsters of Manhattan †	Herman Schultz / Shocker II	Web Series

=== Video games ===
Year	Title	Role	Notes
2020	Final Fantasy VII Remake		Additional voices
2021	Doki Doki Literature Club Plus!	Caeser	
2023	Pinball M - The Thing	R.J. MacReady	
2024	What If...? An Immersive Story	Steve Rogers / Titan Judge	

=== Stage ===
Year	Title	Role	Notes
2017	Twelfth Night	Sebastian	Theatre
