= The Rose Society =

2015 novel by Marie Lu

- Author: Marie Lu
- Language: English
- Genre: Fantasy, young adult
- Published: October 13, 2015
- Publisher: G. P. Putnam's Sons
- Publication place: United States
- Pages: 395
- Preceded by: The Young Elites
- Followed by: The Midnight Star

Professional ratings
Review scores
Source	Rating
Barnes & Noble	4.5/5 stars
Goodreads	4/5 stars

The Rose Society is a fantasy novel by American author Marie Lu released on October 13, 2015. It is the second book in The Young Elites trilogy, being preceded by The Young Elites. The story follows Adelina Amouteru as she embraces her notorious newfound identity as the "White Wolf" and undertakes to form a new 'society' to rival the Dagger Society, whose remaining members expelled her, and the anti-malfetto government.

== Background ==
Lu revealed in various interviews that she felt uncomfortable writing The Rose Society as it explored Adelina's more psychotic side, stating that she was scared that nobody would want to read a story with a character as "unlikeable" as Adelina, and she struggled to make it look reasonable and not just a symptom of pure insanity. She compared Adelina to Darth Vader stating that she initially thought it would be "fun to write from Darth Vader’s point-of-view", but eventually realized that she was instead exploring the darker, more complex sides of psychologically unstable villains.

== Plot ==
Adelina Amouteru has turned her back on the people she loves and has loved after they turned theirs to her, except for her sister, Violetta, the only person that prevents her from submitting to the darkness that threatens to consume her. Amouteru strives to form a new 'society' composing of only the strongest malfettos, which includes Magiano and a discarded Dagger. She calls it The Rose Society.

After gathering the Rose Society, Adelina manages to take control of Kenettra as the nation's new queen, with Teren imprisoned and the previous queen dead.

== Reception ==
The book peaked at number two on the New York Times Best Seller list.
