= Phil Hawkins =

English film director

- Born: December 26, 1984 (age 41); Manchester, United Kingdom

Phil Hawkins (born December 26, 1984) is a commercial, television and independent film director from Manchester, United Kingdom. His work in feature film includes Prancer: A Christmas Tale (2022) and Robin And The Hoods (2024) He is also known for appearing in the Fox/DreamWorks reality television show On The Lot produced by Steven Spielberg.

== Career ==
Hawkins directed his first short film when he was 13, and admits that it wasn't very good. He had no formal education in film and is entirely self-taught. He learned the film-making trade by taking part in a lot of 48-hour film challenges. When he was 17 he gained a place on the BBC's Mentor Project. With a £1000 fund he made a short called The Dotted Line which got him noticed by a TV advertising production company.

His first feature, The Women Of Troy, won Best Director at the New York Independent Film Festival in 2006.

In late 2006, Hawkins was signed by the Dutch production company Dynamic Entertainment to direct the film version of Philip Pullman's novel The Butterfly Tattoo, The independent film won three awards at international festivals, including Best Director at the New York Independent Film Festival in 2008 - the second time Hawkins has won this award.

In mid-2010, Hawkins shot the film Being Sold in just two days. The film went won Best Film and Best Actor for its lead Christopher Dane at the London Independent Film Festival.

In 2013 Hawkins directed the horror film The Last Showing, starring Robert Englund. The film had a budget of £2m and was shot in the north west of England. It had its world premier in 2014 at Frightfest before being released on DVD and VOD. Englund commented: "You know, it’s so great to work for someone as gifted as Phil Hawkins. After a day and a half of working with him. I was like, “Where’s he been all my life?”"

2022 marked Hawkins’ first studio feature film. Prancer: A Christmas Tale was made for Universal, produced by Raffaella De Laurentiis and stars James Cromwell.

His latest feature film is the family action adventure Robin and the Hoods for Sky Studios. The film stars Oscar-nominee Naomie Harris, Gwendoline Christie, Mark Williams (actor) and rising star Darcey Ewart.

=== Star Wars: Origins ===
In 2019, Phil wrote and directed the epic fan film Star Wars: Origins to critical acclaim. Jacob Stolworthy of The Independent called it, "a must-watch for any fan." The film took inspiration from the Star Wars and Indiana Jones franchises, with online publication Nerdist describing it as a "mashup."

=== On The Lot ===
In 2007, Hawkins was the only filmmaker from the UK selected by Steven Spielberg and Mark Burnett to appear on the Fox/DreamWorks reality television show On The Lot for filmmakers.

=== TV commercials ===
In addition to his film work, Hawkins has directed many TV commercials for a wide range of advertising agencies and production companies worldwide. He’s worked with high profile talent including Christopher Walken.

== Filmography ==
Year	Film	Credit
2008	Philip Pullman's The Butterfly Tattoo (film)	Director
2011	Being Sold	Director
2014	The Last Showing	Director
2015	The Four Warriors	Director
2019	Say Grace	Director
2019	Star Wars: Origins	Director
2022	Prancer: A Christmas Tale	Director
2024	Robin and the Hood	Director

== Awards ==
- Best Feature Director at the New York Independent Film and Video Festival 2006 for The Woman of Troy
- Best Feature Director at the New York Independent Film and Video Festival 2008 for The Butterfly Tattoo
