= Robin and the Hoods =

British family comedy film

- Release poster
- Directed by: Phil Hawkins
- Written by: Stuart Benson; Paul Davidson
- Produced by: Claudia Bluemhuber; Matt Williams
- Starring: Naomie Harris; Gwendoline Christie; Darcey Ewart
- Cinematography: David Meadows
- Edited by: Andrew Walton
- Music by: James Everingham
- Production companies: Silver Reel Productions; Future Artists Entertainment
- Distributed by: Sky Cinema
- Release date: July 26, 2024
- Running time: 101 minutes
- Country: United Kingdom
- Language: English

Robin and the Hoods is a 2024 Sky Cinema family comedy film. It is directed by Phil Hawkins and written by Stuart Benson & Paul Davidson. It is produced by Claudia Bluemhuber and Matt Williams for Silver Reel productions and Future Artists Entertainment. It stars Naomie Harris, Gwendoline Christie, Mark Williams and Darcey Ewart. It premiered in the UK on Sky Cinema on 26 July 2024.

== Cast ==
- Naomie Harris as Clipboard
- Gwendoline Christie as Aura
- Darcey Ewart as Robin
- Gloria Ishikawa as Amaya
- Dexter Sol Ansell as Little Dan
- Bruno Edgington-Gibson as Glen
- Eddison Burch as Henry
- Mark Williams as The Mayor
- Morgana Robinson as Cathy
- Christine Bottomley as Bridget
- Tom Goodman-Hill as Nick
- Lucas Welbourne as Hood 4
- Alexa Goodall as Knight 1
- Harry Connor as Knight 2
- Jack Attenborough as Hood

== Premise ==
A real estate developer (Harris) threatens the neighbourhood of 11 year-old Robin (Ewart) and her gang The Hoods.

== Production ==
The script by Stuart Benson & Paul Davidson was developed with Karol Griffiths and optioned by Silver Reel in 2021. The film is produced for Sky by Claudia Bluemhuber for Silver Reel and Matt Williams for Future Artists Entertainment. It is directed by Phil Hawkins.

Principal photography took place in England the summer of 2023. Filming locations include Carr Mill Dam.

With a view to sustainability and the preservation of green space, the production hired 50% of the costumes and sourced others from charity shops. Props and materials were also reused to minimise waste.
