= BookExpo America =

Former annual book trade fair in the United States

- Genre: Book publishing
- Location: varies (New York City 2009–2015, Los Angeles in 2008, Chicago in 2016)
- Country: United States
- Organizer: Reed Exhibitions
- Website: http://www.bookexpoamerica.com/

BookExpo America (commonly referred to within the book publishing industry as BEA) was an annual book trade fair in the United States. BEA was almost always held in a major city over four days in late May and/or early June. Nearly all significant book publishers in the United States, and many from abroad, had booths and exhibits at BEA, and used the fair as an opportunity to showcase upcoming titles, sell current books, socialize with colleagues from other publishing houses, and sell and buy subsidiary rights and international rights. Authors, librarians, and buyers for book retailers also attended the event.

In later years, it was accompanied by the spin-off event BookCon, a literature fan convention oriented towards the general public.

== History ==
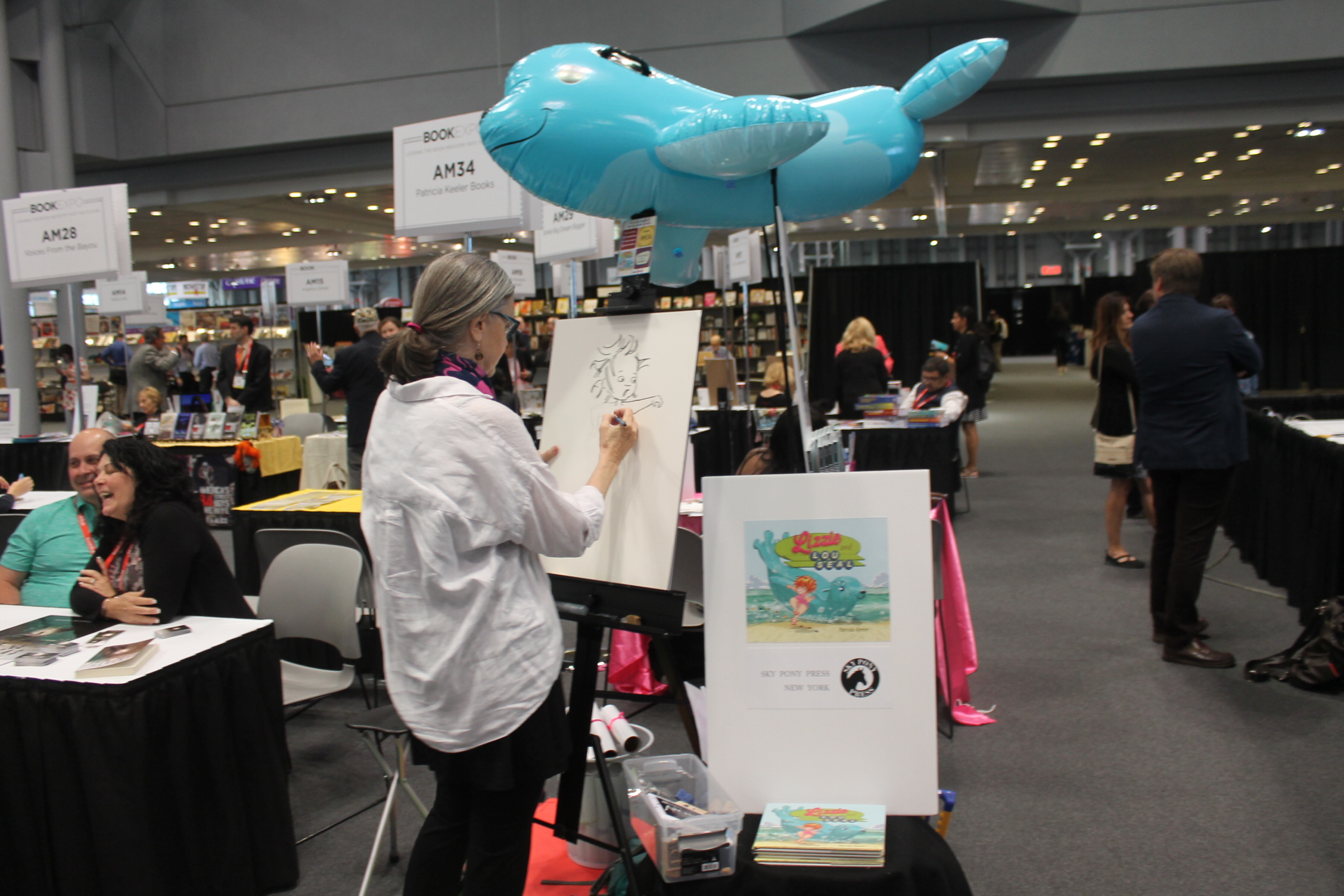
The exhibit hall at BookExpo America in 2017

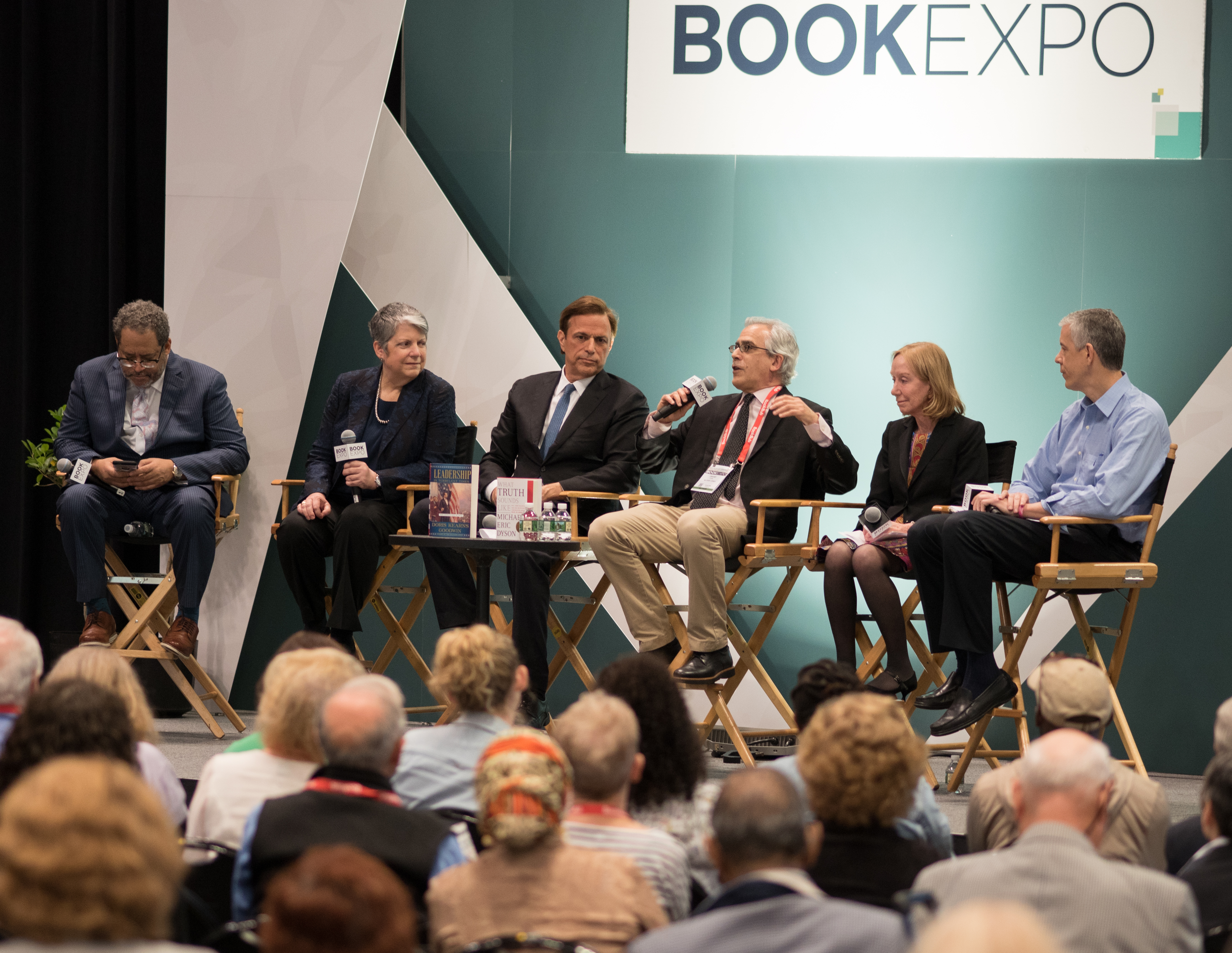
A political panel at the 2018 BookExpo America

The event was founded as the American Booksellers Association Convention and Trade Show in 1947 and continued under this name until 1994, when Reed Exhibitions purchased a 49% share of the event. The following year, 1995, Reed took 100% control and renamed the convention BookExpo America.

From its beginning until 1970, it was held in Washington, D.C. Starting in 1971, it rotated through different cities (1971 Boston, 1972 Washington, 1973 Los Angeles, 1974 Washington, 1975 New York, and so on). In the 1990s and early 2000s, BEA was often held in Chicago. BEA was held in Washington, D.C. in 2006, in New York City in 2007, and in Los Angeles in 2008. BEA was held at the Jacob K. Javits Convention Center in New York City from 2009 through 2015. BEA returned to Chicago in 2016.

The 2015 book fair featured Chinese publishers for the first time.

For a time, DigiCon from the International Digital Publishing Forum (IDPF) ran concurrently with BEA. However, the IDPF was absorbed into the W3C in 2017; no further DigiCon events have been announced, though the W3C holds other conferences on digital publishing.

The 2020 edition was initially delayed from May 2020 to July 2020 due to the COVID-19 pandemic, but was later canceled. In December 2020, Reed Exhibitions announced that BookExpo America and sister events BookCon and Unbound would be "retired" indefinitely in order to "explore new ways to meet the community's needs through a fusion of in-person and virtual events."

== See also ==
- Books in the United States
