= Wildcard (novel) =

2018 novel by Marie Lu

- Author: Marie Lu
- Language: English
- Series: Warcross
- Genre: Science fiction, GameLit, Young Adult fiction
- Publisher: G.P. Putnam's Sons
- Publication date: September 18, 2018
- Publication place: United States
- Media type: hardcover, paperback, e-book, audiobook
- Pages: 352
- ISBN: 978-0399547997
- Preceded by: Warcross

Wildcard is a science fiction gamelit novel written by Marie Lu on September 18, 2018. The book serves as a sequel to the hit novel Warcross, also written by Lu, and follows the protagonist Emika Chen as she continues her hunt for Hideo, a rogue AI.

== Publication history ==
Lu's background as an art designer for the video game industry influenced her to create a relatable and realistic videogame-like setting for her books. The books also allowed her to blend multiple genres, from young adult, to dystopian, and science fiction and gamelit.

Additionally, Lu had already planned for the series to be a two-parter, stating, "I had an erroneous idea that writing a duology would be simpler than writing a trilogy because I would get to cut out the middle book. It turns out it was actually harder because Wildcard became this combination of having to write a book two and three at the same time."

== Premise ==
Emika Chen barely made it out of the Warcross Championships alive. Now that she knows the truth behind Hideo's new NeuroLink algorithm, she can no longer trust the one person she's always looked up to, who she once thought was on her side. Determined to put a stop to Hideo's grim plans, Emika and the Phoenix Riders band together, only to find a new threat lurking on the neon-lit streets of Tokyo. Someone's put a bounty on Emika's head, and her sole chance for survival lies with Zero and the Blackcoats, his ruthless crew. But Emika soon learns that Zero isn't all that he seems - and his protection comes at a price.

== Reception ==
Wildcard garnered positive reception upon release. Amna from The Pop Culturalist gave it a positive review, saying, "[It] is everything you want in a finale: explosive, intense, emotional, entertaining, and most importantly, 100% satisfying."

The Bookish Libra described it as "more intense" than the first book, stating, "The stakes are definitely higher in this second installment since it moves beyond the idea of a bunch of teams trying to win a video game tournament. Some of the differences worked for me, and some of them didn’t quite work, but even with the issues I had with Wildcard, I still think it’s a very worthy follow-up to Warcross."
