= Marie Lu =

Chinese-American author (born 1984)

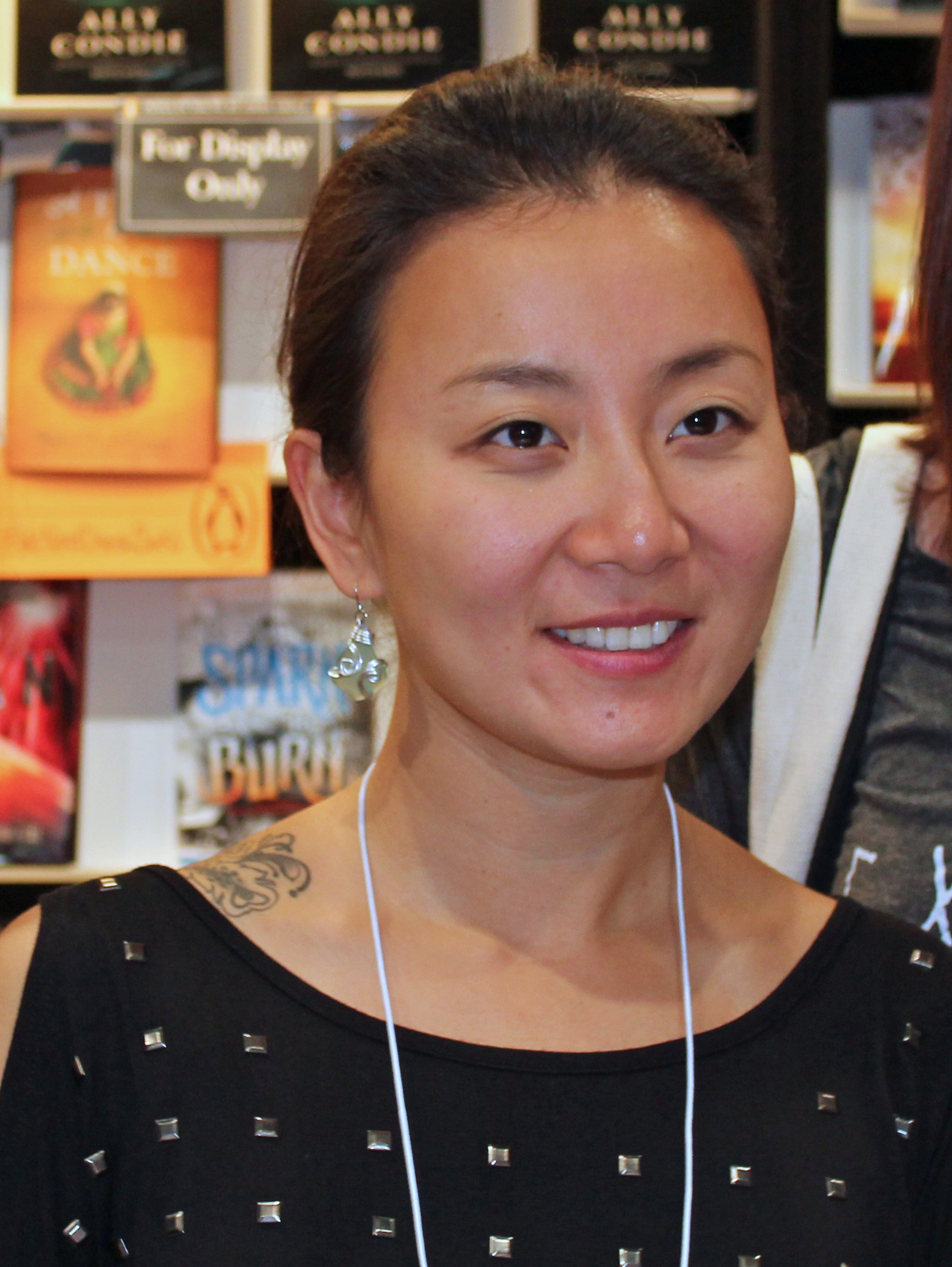
- Lu in 2014
- Born: Xiwei Lu; July 11, 1984 (age 42); Wuxi, Jiangsu, China
- Education: University of Southern California
- Occupation: Novelist
- Spouse: Primo Gallanosa
- Children: 1
- Writing career
- Pen name: Marie Lu
- Period: 2011–present
- Genres: Young adult fiction, Dystopian fiction
- Notable works: Legend (2011); Prodigy (2013); Champion (2013); The Young Elites (2014); The Rose Society (2015); The Midnight Star (2016); Warcross (2017); Wildcard (2018); Rebel (2019); The Kingdom of Back (2020); Skyhunter (2020); Steelstriker (2021)

Marie Lu (born 11 July 1984; born Xiwei Lu, Chinese: 陸希未) is an American young adult science fiction and fantasy author. She is best known for the Legend series, novels set in a dystopian and militarized future, as well as the Young Elites series, the Warcross series, and Batman: Nightwalker in the DC Icons series.

== Early life ==
Lu was born in 1984 in Wuxi, Jiangsu, China, and later moved to Beijing. In 1989, she and her family moved to the United States in Texas when she was five years old, during the Tiananmen Square Protest. She grew up between Baton Rouge, New Orleans, and Houston, learning English by writing stories. She attended the University of Southern California, where she studied political science and biology, and interned as an artist at Disney Interactive Studios.

Lu currently lives in the Arts District of Los Angeles with her husband, their son (born 2019) and three dogs.

== Career ==
Lu's debut novel, Legend, was published November 29, 2011 as the first of a young adult science fiction trilogy. Lu has said that she was inspired by the movie Les Miserables and sought to recreate the conflict between Valjean and Javert in a teenage version. Two other books in the planned trilogy, Prodigy and Champion, were published in 2013.

Lu's first fantasy series began with publication of The Young Elites on October 7, 2014. It was followed by The Rose Society on October 13, 2015, and The Midnight Star on October 16, 2016.

Lu and her husband, Primo Gallanosa, worked together on a game called Fuzz Academy, which was shut down after being hacked.

== Works ==
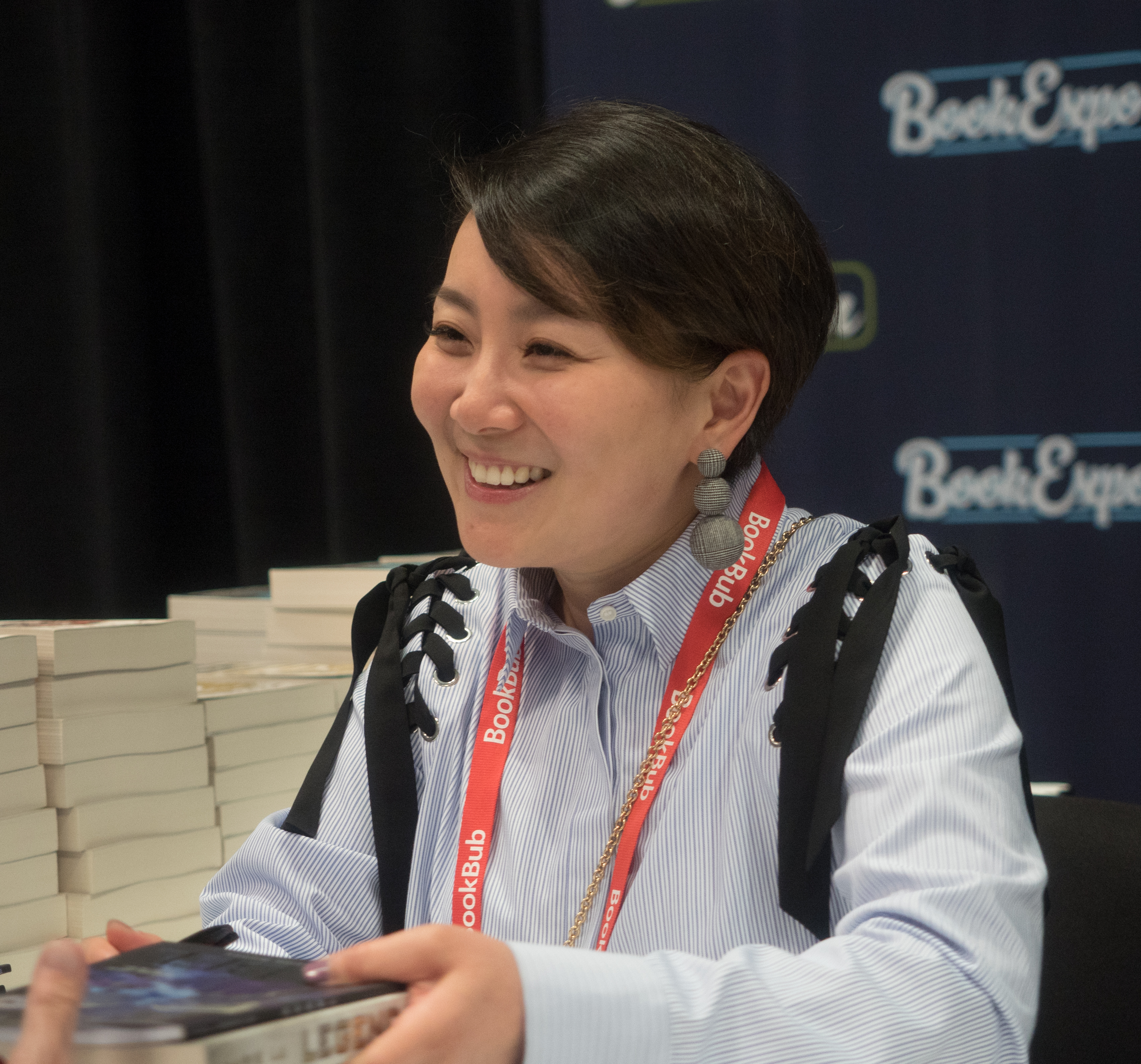
Lu at BookCon in June 2019

=== Legend series ===
- Legend (November 29, 2011)
- Prodigy (January 8, 2013)
- Champion (November 5, 2013)
- Life Before Legend (Novella #0.5) (January 5, 2013)
- Life After Legend (Novella #3.5) (2017)
- Life After Legend II (Novella #3.6) (2018)
- Rebel (October 1, 2019)

=== The Young Elites series ===
- The Young Elites (October 7, 2014)
- The Rose Society (October 13, 2015)
- The Midnight Star (October 16, 2016)

=== Warcross series ===
- Warcross (September 12, 2017)
- Wildcard (September 18, 2018)

=== Skyhunter series ===
- Skyhunter (September 29, 2020)
- Steelstriker (September 28, 2021)

=== Stars and Smoke series ===
- Stars and Smoke (March 28, 2023)
- Icon and Inferno (June 11, 2024)

=== The New Alchemists series ===
- Red City (October 14, 2025)
- Silver Dawn (April 27, 2027)

=== Mortal Things series ===
- Mortal Things (October 13, 2026)

=== DC Icons series ===
- Batman: Nightwalker (DC Icons, Book 2) (January 2, 2018)

=== Spirit Animals series ===
- The Evertree (Spirit Animals, Book 7) (March 31, 2015)

=== Standalone novels ===
- The Kingdom of Back (March 3, 2020)

=== Short stories ===
- "The Journey" in A Tyranny of Petticoats, edited by Jessica Spotswood (March 8, 2017)
- "Surviving"
- “The Girl without a Face” in “Slasher Girls and Monster Boys” by April Genevieve Tucholke (2015)
