= Star Wars: Origins =

- The YouTube thumbnail of the film
- Directed by: Phil Hawkins
- Written by: Phil Hawkins
- Based on: Star Wars by George Lucas and Indiana Jones by: Lucas; Philip Kaufman
- Starring: Marie Everett; Jamie Costa; Hadrian Howard; Philip Walker
- Cinematography: David Meadows
- Music by: Richard Bodgers
- Production companies: PhilmCo; Velvet Film
- Release date: 12 December 2019 (YouTube)
- Running time: 21 minutes
- Country: United Kingdom
- Language: English

Star Wars: Origins is a 2019 British Star Wars and Indiana Jones fan film written and directed by Phil Hawkins. The films stars Marie Everett, Jamie Costa, Hadrian Howard, and Philip Walker. It was uploaded to YouTube on December 12, 2019.

== Cast ==
- Marie Everett as Ellie
- Jamie Costa as Walter
- Hadrian Howard as Saif
- Philip Walker as Ackbar

== Background ==
The film takes inspiration from the Star Wars and Indiana Jones franchises, with online publication Nerdist describing it as a "mashup."

It also contains Easter eggs relating to the two franchises., which was inspired by the Easter egg in Raiders of the Lost Ark (1981), where the Star Wars characters, C-3PO and R2-D2 appear as hieroglyphs.

== Synopsis ==
The official synopsis states, "Star Wars: Origins takes a unique look at where it all began. A thrilling action adventure film drawing inspiration from both Star Wars and Indiana Jones to tell an epic story based on Earth during WWII."

== Production ==
The project took over three years in total to be completed.

External videos
- A two and a half minute VFX breakdown featurette by Flipbook Studio (uploaded to the official Star Wars: Origins YouTube channel) on YouTube

According to publication Prolific North, in May 2019, the executive producers approached VFX company, Flipbook Studio, to produce the special effects for the project. They were given a deadline of eight weeks, and in this time were able to complete 100 VFX shots in a 4K resolution.

External videos
- A four minute behind the scenes/making of featurette (uploaded to the official Star Wars: Origins YouTube channel) on YouTube

Filming took place in June 2019, and was shot on location in the Sahara Desert. Shooting lasted for two days.

It utilizes VCode technology, developed by VST Enterprises, which allows viewers to scan the screen as they watch the film and access special features, such as deleted scenes and comments from the director.

== Reception ==
Star Wars: Origins received positive reviews.

Jacob Stolworthy of The Independent called it, "a must-watch for any fan." Eric Diaz of Nerdist called it, "the mashup you never knew you needed until now." Rachel LaBonte of Screen Rant said, "It's incredibly well-made and thrilling to watch from start to finish." Joey Paur of Geek Tyrant called it, "an entertaining and fun Star Wars fan flick." Alex Billington of FirstShowing.net called it, "spectacular, whimsical, and entertaining," and went on to state, "Not only does this look and sound great, it's a thoroughly entertaining film." Sean Evans of Back to the Movies gave a rating of four and a half out of five stars, and said, "This is one polished package across the board. Solid acting performances, visually stunning and with a unique blend of two iconic franchises there is only one way this film is heading and that’s up."

Ethan Anderton of SlashFilm called it "an impressive and imaginative project that fans will enjoy," and praised the cinematography, visual effects, and production design. However, he criticized the dialogue that references Star Wars, calling it "cheesy," a scene referencing J. J. Abrams' 2009 Star Trek film, calling it "even more ham-fisted," and said, "certain details don't make sense," such as Darth Vader's helmet appearing.

On Twitter, Mark Hamill (the portrayer of Star Wars character Luke Skywalker) replied to the crew of the film, saying, "Congratulations on your well-deserved success. You all did a fantastic job! (thumbs up)."

Citing the comments made on the YouTube upload, Rachel LaBonte reported that the fans' reactions toward the film are positive.

== External links. ==
- Star Wars: Origins on YouTube
- Star Wars: Origins at IMDb
