= The Last Showing =

- Theatrical film poster
- Directed by: Phil Hawkins
- Written by: Phil Hawkins
- Produced by: Alexandra Baranska
- Starring: Robert Englund; Finn Jones; Emily Berrington
- Cinematography: Ed Moore
- Edited by: Paul Griffiths-Davies
- Music by: Richard Bodgers
- Production company: The Philm Company
- Distributed by: Sony Pictures
- Release date: 22 August 2014 (FrightFest)
- Running time: 89 minutes
- Country: United Kingdom
- Language: English
- Budget: $2m

The Last Showing is a 2014 British independent horror thriller film directed by Phil Hawkins. The film had its world premiere on 22 August 2014 at the London FrightFest Film Festival and stars Robert Englund as a movie projectionist who kidnaps a couple for his own sinister purposes.

== Plot ==
Stuart (Robert Englund) is a film purist who despises the current film world, viewing it as vulgar and cheap. After being laid-off from his job as a projectionist and forced to work at the concession stand, Stuart decides to take his revenge. Stuart manages to capture Martin (Finn Jones) and Allie (Emily Berrington), a young couple who have come to his theatre to watch The Hills Have Eyes 2 and make out. After drugging Allie and incapacitating his manager, Stuart traps the couple in the theatre overnight. He then proceeds to use the building's CCTV system and a handheld camcorder to make his own personal horror movie.

== Cast ==
- Robert Englund as Stuart Lloyd
- Finn Jones as Martin Watts
- Emily Berrington as Allie
- Keith Allen as Collins
- Malachi Kirby as Clive
- Chris Geere as Jamie

== Reception ==
The film had a mixed reception from audiences and critics. "Scream: The Horror Magazine" described it as "a superb psychological horror" and Starburst Magazine praised the film describing it as "clever, crazed and contagious... a film that is awash with tradition, twists, atmosphere, and charm. Does for multiplexes what Jaws did for water". The Hollywood Reporter and Hey Guys both panned the movie, which The Hollywood Reporter felt "has a strong pulpy premise, but ultimately lacks the sly humor and jolting shock value required to make it come alive on screen".
