= The Midnight Star =

2016 book by Marie Lu

- Author: Marie Lu
- Language: English
- Series: The Young Elites
- Genre: Fantasy
- Published: October 11, 2016
- Publisher: G.P. Putnam's Sons
- Publication place: United States
- Pages: 316
- Preceded by: The Rose Society

The Midnight Star is a fantasy novel by American author Marie Lu and the third and final book in The Young Elites trilogy. It was released on October 11, 2016. The book follows the titular character, Adelina Amouteru, after her takeover of the kingdom that once hated her.

== Background ==
Asked about how she felt about the book, Lu stated that she felt like a "parent... watching their kid go off to college," claiming that although she felt sad to "leave" Adelina at the end of the book, she was "kind of happy for her, and proud of her." She additionally stated that the book follows Adelina "discovering what she really wants".

== Plot ==
Adelina Amouteru has achieved her goal of defeating all that have ever opposed her but must side with her former enemies in order to defeat a threat greater than all of them. After becoming Queen of Kenettra, Adelina gets a letter from Rafael stating that her sister, Violetta, is dying. After Adelina attacked Violetta, she found sanctuary with the Daggers. Adelina attacks the country in which she believes Violetta is in. Adelina's fury takes control of her and she is unable to think clearly which results in her and her soldier's capture. During the capture, Adelina begs to see Magiano, whom she loves. Later on, she is presented to a court in which Rafael, Enzo, and other members of the Daggers are. Because many elites have godlike powers, they are unable to contain their powers and it eventually will kill them. They make a deal with Adelina in which she and the Roses travel to the portal of the gods to return their powers. The gods have also had a negative effect on the environment such as sea animals being beached. Adelina later agrees but secretly only because she can be near her dying sister. Enzo attempts to kill Adelina under the influence of the Goddess of Death, Moritas. Luckily, Rafael kills Enzo while Enzo whispers the name of his dead beloved. Rafael saves Adelina and later cries over Enzo's dead body. Each elite that was going on the journey connects with a certain god; The Beldish Queen, Maeve Corrigan, and Teren Santoro are the only ones to connect with Moritas and Tristius, Angel of War. Much to Adelina's disgust, Maeve and Teren are brought on the journey. During the journey, Adelina confesses her love for Magiano, and for the first time in a long time, Adelina is able to sleep without the voices in her head talking. As the elites get closer to the portal, their powers and the negative effects of their powers increase. This results in Violetta's death. Everyone mourns the death of Violetta but continues on the journey. After reaching the portal, Maeve's men wait outside the portal for the elites' return. The elites enter the portal and meet monsters that feed on their godlike powers. Teren dies protecting others from the monsters and Adelina cries even though she hates him. All go and meet Moritas and bargain with her and return their powers. Adelina meets the Moritas and sees the dead body of Violetta and begins to cry. Moritas states that for one to come back to life, another life must be taken. Adelina cries and apologizes to Magiano for leaving him and trades her life for her sister because if Violetta were in the same situation, she would have traded her life for Adelina's. Violetta is transported back to the entrance of the portal where she cries and explains what happened. Maeve's men greeted their Queen and says she has been gone to the portal for two months. Violetta apologizes to Magiano who in return says that it was Adelina's choice. A couple of months later Violetta begs the Goddess of Empathy, Compasia, to give her sister back. Compasia apologizes to Moritas and makes Adelina into a star just as Compasia did to her human lover. Magiano follows Adelina's constellation and in the book it states:

If you are very quiet and do not look away, you may see the brightest star in the constellation glow steadily brighter. It brightens until it overwhelms every other star in the sky, brightens until it seems to touch the ground, and then the glow is gone, and in its place is a girl. Her hair and lashes are painted a shifting silver, and a scar crosses one side of her face. She is dressed in Sealand silk and a necklace of sapphire. Some say that, once upon a time, she had a prince, a father, a society of friends. Others say that she was once a wicked queen, a worker of illusions, a girl who brought darkness across the lands. Still, others say that she once had a sister, and that she loved her dearly. Perhaps all of these are true. She walks to the boy, tilts her head up at him, and smiles. He bends down to kiss her. Then he helps her onto the horse, and she rides away with him to a faraway place, until they can no longer be seen.

These are only rumors, of course, and make little more than a story to tell around a fire. But it is told. And thus they live on.

== Promotion ==
To promote the book, Lu went on a book signing tour. It began on October 11, the release date of the book, and ended on October 25, 2016.

== Reception ==
Kirkus Reviews commended the ending of the trilogy stating "the affecting conclusion to the Young Elites trilogy relishes ardent emotion but is never mawkish," before going to say that "like many a classic antihero's, Adelina's trajectory is both sobering and satisfying."
