= The Young Elites =

Fantasy novel by Marie Lu

- Author: Marie Lu
- Language: English
- Genre: Fantasy, young adult
- Published: October 7, 2014
- Publisher: G. P. Putnam's Sons
- Publication place: United States
- Pages: 344
- Followed by: The Rose Society

The Young Elites is a fantasy novel by novelist Marie Lu released on October 7, 2014. It is the first novel in the trilogy. The second book is called The Rose Society and was released on October 13, 2015. The third book, The Midnight Star, was released October 11, 2016.

== Plot ==
A decade after the blood fever swept through the nation, most survivors—all of whom were children—gained strange markings during their time of illness. Those with visible markings became known as malfettos. When people close to malfettos, such as family members, began having strange accidents or deaths, people began to believe that these malfettos were bad luck and began treating them as second-class citizens. It is not widely known that the blood fever gifted some of these malfetto children with strange abilities—the children with these powers became known as the Young Elites. The Inquisition Axis believes that Young Elites are dangerous and vengeful and will destroy the nation, and thus seek to destroy them before they can do so.

Adelina Amouteru was a survivor of the blood fever and, as a result, her black hair turned silver and she lost her left eye. She grew up with an abusive father who wished to exploit any possible abilities that she may have developed. One night, in an attempt to escape from her father, she accidentally murders him when her powers manifest: she is a Young Elite who can weave illusions that can trick the sense of sight, touch, smell, and sound. She is then caught by The Inquisition Axis, led by a secret malfetto named Teren Santoro, and imprisoned. Later, in the middle of her execution, she is rescued by The Dagger Society, a group of Young Elites that seek others like themselves and teach them how to control and use their gifts.

Though it seemed that the Dagger Society have saved her out of kindness at first, the motives of Enzo, the leader of the society, are revealed. Enzo is the former heir of the throne. After his parents’ deaths, his sister removed his title and banished him from the palace for being a malfetto. She then married a duke, who became king, and started denouncing malfettos so Enzo could not regain the throne. Enzo seeks to overthrow the current king and gain control of the kingdom with the help of the Dagger Society. As the story continues, Enzo and Adelina start to develop feelings towards each other.

In the climax, Enzo battles Teren and Adelina attempts to use her power to cause Teren severe pain. She mistakenly attacks Enzo though, and with the distraction, Teren kills him. The Dagger Society expels her and she flees the country on a ship, vowing to create her own army and return.

== Characters ==
- Adelina Amouteru Adelina, also known as the White Wolf, is the 16 year old main character of the story. A malfetto herself, her once brown hair has turned silver, and she's missing her left eye. After the death of her mother during the blood fever, she grows up with her cruel and abusive father, leaving a vengeful darkness in her heart. After silently witnessing how he sells her to a merchant as a paramour (not even wife), she flees her home in the middle of the night. Her father notices, follows her and intends to forcefully bring her back. Adelina, in a sudden and heavy outburst of her illusionist powers, accidentally kills him. She is subsequently captured by the Inquisition and sentenced to the stake. Shortly before being burned alive, she is saved by members of The Dagger Society and ultimately joins their ranks. She there finds out her powers are strongly linked to fear and anger, mirroring her horrifying childhood. During the training with the leader of the group, Enzo Valenciano, her powers of illusion quickly grow. She is very protective of her little sister Violetta and finds herself torn apart between fear and a bad conscience when Violetta's life is threatened by Teren Santoro.
- Enzo Valenciano Enzo is the founder of The Dagger Society. Publicly only known as The Reaper, Enzo is the son of the late king, crown prince to Kenettra and the rightful heir to the throne. Enzo was deposed by his elder sister Giulietta who gained the throne along with her husband, a powerful duke. After she became queen, Giulietta banished Enzo from the palace. The monarchs encourage the hunt of malfettos and portray them as demons and bringers of ill fortune in order to keep Enzo unfit for the throne. Seeking vengeance, Enzo forms the Dagger Society, planning to assassinate the king and queen and rightfully take the throne. The blood fever turned his hair and eyes dark red. He has the power to create and manipulate fire in all sorts of ways.
- Maeve Corrigan Maeve is the queen of the kingdom of Beldain, where malfettos are celebrated as children of the gods. Maeve is the youngest of her siblings, all seven of which are her brothers. The young queen is an Elite, she has the power to resurrect the dead, with the side effect of the resurrected slowly loosing themselves to the Underworld, and Maeve losing some of her life energy. She has kept it a secret from everyone, even Lucent, who shares a mutual love with her. Maeve's marking is clearly shown, as her hair is split into brilliant gold and midnight black.
- Teren Santoro Teren Santoro works for the queen, whom he has a secret love affair with. As leader of the Inquisition, it is his job to seek out the Young Elites, to destroy them before they destroy the nation. He believes the elites to be unworthy scum, but still dangerous. Yet, unbeknownst to most people, Teren himself is also an elite and has the ability to instantly heal all kinds of wounds on himself as well as superhuman strength. The blood fever marked him with light blonde hair and formerly blue, now almost colourless eyes. He was once a childhood friend of Enzo's, having grown up in the palace as son of the First Inquisitor, but since Enzo became a malfetto and got dispelled from the court, the friendship quickly vanished. Teren does not know Enzo is The Reaper and is very surprised and upset to discover his former friend under the mask of his now greatest enemy when they duel at the end of the novel.
- Violetta Amouteru She is two years younger than her sister Adelina. Until the very end of the volume, she is believed to have no powers and to be "pure " and no malfetto, thus being her and Adelina's father's favourite, spoiled and seemingly happy and carefree child. She has a friendly, compassionate soul and frequently tried to persuade their father to let go of Adelina when he was tormenting her. She also tried to save Adelina from the Inquisition after she got captured, risking her own life and getting taken prisoner by Teren Santoro. Yet she turns out to be an elite, having the ability to take other elites' powers temporarily and to sense them. Due to her kind of power, she has no marks and doesn't get recognized as a malfetto.
- Raffaele Laurent Bessette Second in command and second founding member of the Dagger Society, Raffaele has the ability to manipulate other people's emotions - which he mostly uses for calm and comfort - and to sense the powers of Young Elites. He is very calm and thoughtful, a foresightful tactician and a scholar in some way. Also known as The Messenger, he collects information about the elites and their abilities, wishing to preserve them for future generations. He has two markings, one being the blue streaks in his black hair, and the other being his eyes, one of which has an emerald colour, the other one bright amber. Knowing of Adelina's inclination to fear and anger, he is worried about what she might become and counsels Enzo to kill her before she can betray or murder them.
- Lucent Also known as Windwalker, Lucent has the ability to manipulate air and wind, and do whatever those can do (scream, howl, fly, whistle etc.). She is an outcast of her homeland of Beldain and became a member of The Dagger Society a couple of years earlier. She has red-blonde, curly hair. Her marks are grey spirals going up her arms.
- Michel He has the ability to "unravel" non-living objects and make them appear in another place, similar to teleportation. Michel is a skilled artist, and taught Adelina to create more realistic illusions while she was in The Dagger Society. His nickname is The Architect.
- Gemma Salvatore Gemma is known as the Star Thief and can command and control animals with her powers. She is a member of The Dagger Society as well as of the gentry class of Kenettra. Her father being a powerful and influential man among nobility, this is the only reason she's still allowed to walk around publicly and to participate in public events despite being a malfetto. Adelina is secretly envious of this loving and supportive father-daughter-relationship. Gemma's powers are linked to kindness, and she finds herself more often than not followed randomly by stray animals. She has a purple marking that covers half her face.
- Dante Dante is another recruit of The Dagger Society and was once a blacksmith apprentice. His mark from the blood fever is dark, irregular markings that stretch from across his neck to part of his chest. He's known as the Spider for his strength and quickness and his ability to see in darkness. From the very beginning he was wary of Adelina's presence on the team and her powers and shows open distrust and aggression towards her. He frequently mocks and threatens Adelina and tries to persuade the others to get rid of her. His main argument in trying to convince Enzo is the developing mutual infatuation between Enzo and Adelina. Dante believes Enzo's feelings blind him on the one hand and are actually directed towards Enzo's former (and deceased) girlfriend Daphne on the other hand, who looked very similar to Adelina. Dante is also the only one who early on realises that Adelina is giving information about the Daggers to Teren Santoro, but, not knowing she does so in order to save her sister, suspects her of treason. Blinded by his assumptions and rage, he attacks Adelina and tries to kill her, only to be killed by her when she loses control of her powers.

== Reception ==
Professional ratings
Review scores
Source	Rating
The Guardian	3.5/5 stars

The Guardian gave it 3.5 stars. The book reached number 4 on the New York Times bestseller list.

== Sequels ==
The second novel in the series is called The Rose Society and was released on October 13, 2015. The third and final book, The Midnight Star, was released on October 11, 2016.

== Film adaptation ==
On April 14, 2015, it was announced that the studio and producers behind The Maze Runner franchise, Fox and Temple Hill Entertainment, had bought the film rights.
