= Deadpool The Musical 2 – Ultimate Disney Parody =

- Directed by: Julian Higgins
- Screenplay by: Paul Bianchi
- Story by: Paul Bianchi; Brian Danner; Julian Higgins; Michael S. Parker
- Produced by: Paul Bianchi; Brian Danner; Julian Higgins
- Starring: Michael S. Parker; Sheila Collins; Vic Mignogna; Kate Le; Brian Danner; Monette Moio; Joe Santos; Casper Van Dien; Jennifer Wenger; Orion Barnes; David Bauer; Elliott Branch Jr.; Jamie Costa
- Cinematography: Pierce Cook
- Edited by: Julian Higgins
- Production company: Zamurai Productions
- Distributed by: Zamurai Productions
- Release date: July 10, 2018 (YouTube)

Deadpool The Musical 2 – Ultimate Disney Parody is a 2018 parody short fan film directed by Julian Higgins and written by Paul Bianchi and Brian Danner. It stars Michael S. Parker, Sheila Collins, Vic Mignogna, and Kate Le.

== Cast ==
- Michael S. Parker as Deadpool
- Sheila Collins as Blind Al
- Vic Mignogna as Beast / Captain America (voice)
- Kate Le as Jubilee
- Brian Danner as Wolverine / Ant Man
- Monette Moio as Black Widow
- Joe Santos as Hawkeye
- Casper Van Dien as Cyclops
- Jennifer Wenger as Rogue
- Orion Barnes as Doctor Strange
- David Bauer as Beast
- Elliott Branch Jr. as Nick Fury
- Jamie Costa as Iron Man (voice)

== Production ==
The film is a parody to several Disney movies including Moana, Mulan, and Aladdin. It is a follow up to Higgins' short fan film titled Deadpool The Musical.

== Reception ==
Inverse said "this fan film ain't a bad way to quench your Deadpool thirst." Io9 said it "boasts some great action sequences, fun character moments, and decent songs." A review at Nerdist said "it's hard to walk around singing a catchy musical number stuck in your head when it has so many f-bombs."
