= Agent Elvis =

American adult animated sitcom television series

- Title screen
- Genre: Sitcom; Action comedy; Black comedy; Biographical; Adventure; Spy fiction
- Created by: Priscilla Presley; John Eddie
- Developed by: Mike Arnold; John Eddie
- Directed by: Gary Ye
- Voices of: Matthew McConaughey; Kaitlin Olson; Johnny Knoxville; Niecy Nash; Tom Kenny; Don Cheadle
- Music by: Tyler Bates; Timothy Williams
- Country of origin: United States
- Original language: English
- No. of seasons: 1
- No. of episodes: 10

Production
- Executive producers: Mike Arnold; Priscilla Presley; John Eddie; Kevin Noel; Matthew McConaughey; Chris Prynoski; Shannon Prynoski; Antonio Canobbio; Ben Kalina; Jamie Salter; Corey Salter; Marc Rosen
- Producer: Seranie Manoogian
- Running time: 23–27 minutes
- Production companies: Sony Pictures Animation; Titmouse, Inc.

Original release
- Network: Netflix
- Release: March 17, 2023

Agent Elvis is an American adult animated television series created by Priscilla Presley, the ex-wife of American singer Elvis Presley, and singer-screenwriter John Eddie, and developed by Mike Arnold and Eddie for Netflix.

The series follows the exploits of a fictionalized version of American rock and roll legend Elvis Presley (voiced by Matthew McConaughey), who moonlights as a spy for the United States government. The supporting cast of characters includes other historical figures from the 20th century, including cult leader Charles Manson, film producer Howard Hughes, psychologist Timothy Leary, filmmaker Stanley Kubrick, politician Richard Nixon, actor and singer Robert Goulet, musician Paul McCartney, and actor Kurt Russell.

The series premiered on March 17, 2023. In November 2023, the series was canceled after one season.

== Voice cast and characters ==
=== Main ===
- Matthew McConaughey as Elvis Presley
- Kaitlin Olson as CeCe Ryder, a secret agent who works with Elvis
- Johnny Knoxville as Bobby Ray, Elvis' best friend and stuntman
- Niecy Nash as Bertie, Elvis' legal guardian
- Tom Kenny as Scatter, Elvis' drug-addicted chimpanzee
- Don Cheadle as The Commander, CeCe's handler

=== Recurring ===
- Priscilla Presley as herself
- Asif Ali as Doyle
- Jason Mantzoukas as Howard Hughes

=== Guest ===
- Fred Armisen as Charles Manson
- Chris Elliott as Timothy Leary
- Ron Tutt as himself
- Baz Luhrmann as The Director
- Tony Cavalero as Flyboy
- Dee Bradley Baker as Stanley Kubrick
- Gary Cole as President Nixon
- Ed Helms as Robert Goulet
- Christina Hendricks as Roxanne Ryder
- George Clinton as himself
- Ego Nwodim as Zara
- Simon Pegg as Paul McCartney
- Craig Robinson as Jackie
- Jamie Costa as Kurt Russell
- Kieran Culkin as Gabriel Wolf

Carlos Alazraqui, Tara Strong, Cree Summer, Jim Meskimen, Ilia Volok, Gary Anthony Williams, Michael-Leon Wooley, and Eric Bauza provide additional voices

== Episodes ==
No.	Title	Directed by	Written by	Original release date
1	"Full Tilt"	Gary Ye	Mike Arnold	March 17, 2023
2	"F*ck You, Vegas"	Gary Ye	Casper Kelly	March 17, 2023
3	"Cocaine Tuesdays"	Gary Ye	Mark Ganek	March 17, 2023
4	"Total Mind F*ck"	Gary Ye	Mike Arnold	March 17, 2023
5	"Maximum Density"	Gary Ye	Matt Roller	March 17, 2023
6	"Pookie-Bear"	Gary Ye	Mike Arnold	March 17, 2023
7	"Maghrebi Mint"	Gary Ye	Asha Wilson	March 17, 2023
8	"Head Soup"	Gary Ye	John Eddie	March 17, 2023
9	"Swollen Desire"	Gary Ye	Matt Roller	March 17, 2023
10	"Godspeed, Drunk Monkey"	Gary Ye	Mike Arnold	March 17, 2023

== Reception ==
The review aggregator website Rotten Tomatoes reported a 64% approval rating with an average rating of 5.7/10, based on 21 critic reviews. The website's critics consensus reads, "Agent Elvis one-joke premise won't fill viewers with burning love, but its all-star voice cast and sheer novelty make for an alright, alright, alright animated comedy". Metacritic, which uses a weighted average, assigned a score of 65 out of 100 based on 10 critics, indicating "generally favorable reviews".
