= Han Solo: A Smuggler's Trade =

- Film poster
- Directed by: Keith Allen
- Screenplay by: Jared Bell; Keith Allen; Nathan Nauert
- Story by: Nathan Nauert
- Based on: Characters by George Lucas
- Produced by: Jamie Costa; Jadon Gauthier; David Oakes; Keith Allen
- Starring: Jamie Costa; Doug Jones; Kristine Gerolaga; Cory Daniel
- Cinematography: Kristopher S. Kimlin (director of photography)
- Edited by: Keith Allen; Jadon Gauthier
- Music by: Andrew Gerlicher
- Release date: December 11, 2016 (YouTube)
- Running time: 14 minutes
- Country: United States
- Language: English

Han Solo: A Smuggler's Trade is a 2016 Star Wars fan film starring Jamie Costa as Han Solo and Cory Daniel as Chewbacca. The film also stars Doug Jones and Kristine Gerolaga. On December 11, 2016, it was released to YouTube. As of April 2026, it has received over 2.8 million views.

== Plot ==
Han Solo is caught cheating in a card game trying to win money so he could pay off Chewbacca's freedom. Solo is kicked out of the cantina where he was playing, but it is revealed that he took an old lightsaber from D'Jharn, the man in charge of the cantina, before making his way to give it to Gyorsho, who is keeping Chewbacca. Gyorsho, however, refuses to release Chewbacca, as "Solo cannot be trusted and Wookiees make for valuable slaves in the spice mining industry." Solo suddenly Force grabs the lightsaber off the table, but Gyorsho pushes him down, causing him to drop the weapon in front of Chewbacca. Within moments, Chewbacca releases himself and kills Gyorsho. Later, Solo reveals to Chewbacca that he used a magnetic wristband to pretend he was using the Force. The duo then walks through the desert, pondering how they will get the Millennium Falcon back.

== Cast ==
- Jamie Costa as Han Solo
- Doug Jones as Gyorsho
- Kristine Gerolaga as D'Jharn
- Cory Daniel as Chewbacca
- Bernie Bregman as Gork
- Christopher Troy as Small Thug
- Matt Shadden as Large Thug

== Production ==
=== Funding ===
The crowdfunding site Indiegogo was utilized to earn funding for the project. By the time the crowdfunding closed, the project garnered over US$21,795 from 408 backers.

== Reception ==
James Whitbrook of io9 called the film "nifty" and praised Costa's performance. Ethan Anderton of SlashFilm called the film "rather impressive", praised the production design and Costa's performance, and criticized the aesthetics and visual effects. B. Alan Orange of MovieWeb spoke highly of Costa's performance, and said, "[he] transcends the material here, and actually looks and feels like a young Han Solo." Kevin Fraser of JoBlo.com described the production values as "decent". Joey Paur of GeekTyrant called the film "fun and charming" and described it as "a perfect mix of Star Wars and Indiana Jones". Tom James of Digital Fox Media described the film as "a delightful little movie". Alex Hernandez of Techaeris described it as "... well done and well thought out". John Abbitt of The Unheard Nerd praised Costa's performance, set design, costumes, and music.
