= Bring Him to Me =

2023 film by Luke Sparke

- Theatrical release poster
- Directed by: Luke Sparke
- Written by: Tom Evans
- Produced by: Martin Walton; Sean Virgin; Carmel Imrie; Carly Sparke
- Starring: Barry Pepper; Jamie Costa; Liam McIntyre; Rachel Griffiths; Sam Neill
- Cinematography: Ross W. Clarkson
- Edited by: Luke Sparke
- Music by: Frederik Wiedmann
- Production companies: Myriad Pictures; Sparke Films Productions
- Distributed by: Rialto Distribution
- Release date: 2 November 2023 (Australia / New Zealand)
- Running time: 96 minutes
- Country: Australia
- Language: English
- Box office: $65,492

Bring Him to Me is a 2023 Australian crime thriller film directed and produced by Luke Sparke and written by Tom Evans. The film stars Barry Pepper, Jamie Costa, Liam McIntyre, Rachel Griffiths and Sam Neill.

The film was released in Australia on November 2, 2023. The film was also released in limited theatres in the U.S. and digitally on January 19, 2024.

== Cast ==
- Barry Pepper as Driver
- Jamie Costa as Passenger
- Liam McIntyre as Travis
- Zac Garred as Shaun McCarthy
- Bryan Jennings Brower as Leon
- Sam Neill as Frank McCarthy
- Rachel Griffiths as Veronica

== Production ==
In December 2022, it was reported that Barry Pepper, Sam Neill, Rachel Griffiths, Liam McIntyre, Jamie Costa, Jennings Brower and Zac Garred were cast in the film and that filming occurred in Queensland. By February 2023, the film was in post-production.

Evans' screenplay was inspired by the death scene of Nicky Santoro (played by Joe Pesci) in the Martin Scorsese film Casino (1995).

== Release ==
In February 2023, it was announced that Rialto Distribution acquired Australian and New Zealand distribution rights to the film. It was released in cinemas in Australia and New Zealand on 2 November 2023. Roadside Attractions and Samuel Goldwyn Films released the film in select cinemas and VOD on 19 January 2024, in the United States. Photon Films will distribute in Canada.

== Reception ==
On review aggregator website Rotten Tomatoes, the film holds an approval rating of 62% based on 13 reviews, with an average rating of 5.6/10.
