= Champion (novel) =

2013 novel by Marie Lu

- Champion
- Author: Marie Lu
- Language: English
- Series: Legend series
- Genre: Dystopian, young adult, romance
- Published: November 5, 2013
- Publisher: G. P. Putnam's Sons
- Publication place: United States
- Media type: Print (hardback & paperback), audiobook, e-book
- Pages: 369 pp.
- ISBN: 978-0-399-25677-6
- OCLC: 855507153
- LC Class: PZ7.L96768 Ch 2013
- Preceded by: Prodigy
- Followed by: Rebel

Champion is a dystopian young adult romance novel and the third book in the Legend series written by American novelist Marie Lu. It was released on November 5, 2013.

== Plot ==
After the events of Prodigy, Daniel "Day" Altan Wing now lives as a free citizen in San Francisco with his younger brother, Eden Bataar. Following several months of no communication, Day is contacted by June Iparis about a "feast" held by Anden Stavropoulos, the young Elector of the Republic. In reality, Anden wants Day to hand over Eden as part of the Republic's search for a cure for their virus, wreaking havoc upon the Colonies, causing the latter to give an ultimatum for the cure, lest they and Africa will invade the Republic. Day denies the request and the Republic's cause is further eroded when traitor soldiers Thomas Bryant and Commander Jameson, both in death row for the attempted coup, and the murder of June's brother (Metias Iparis), escape. The next day, Day collapses due to his illness and is rushed to the hospital. The following day, Day tells June about his terminal illness, just before the city is attacked by the Colonies' airships. While the population is being evacuated to Los Angeles, Day works with the Patriot organization to hijack the Colonies' airships. During the event, Thomas sacrifices himself to save Day.

Day is sent to the Los Angeles Central Hospital due to another illness flare-up and is contacted by the Chancellor of the Colonies, who blackmails him into defecting to the Colonies and convincing the masses to do so, or else he will kill June and Eden if the Colonies win. He gives him three days to decide. Day instead spreads messages through graffiti to make the Republic's population support Anden. He also reluctantly decides to let Eden become a test subject to find a cure for biological diseases spreading in the Colonies. Meanwhile, June accompanies Anden to meet with the President of Antarctica to request help for the war. The President refuses, stating that the Republic was infested with disease and that he would aid Anden only if a cure was found along with several plots of land as payment.

The Colonies has conquered Denver and are now landing their airships near the harbor. Day meets with the Chancellor to give an answer for the blackmail: no. He escapes as the Colonies attack Los Angeles. With the war ensuing in the streets, June speeds up the search for the cure when she offers her blood to be tested, as she realizes that she is the missing link required to patch up Eden, due to testing done on her by the colonies in the previous novel. Once the testing is done, she assists the Republic. She confronts Jameson, who has shot Day, and lets her get shot by Republic soldiers. Day almost dies of blood loss with bullet wounds in his chest and hip. After being in a coma for five months, Day wakes up, but has lost all memory of the events of the previous year and does not remember June. She lets him go, believing he will be happier without remembering all the grief she caused him.

In the epilogue, the Republic manages to neutralize the virus as well as opening up and establishing relations with the Colonies by building transborder cities; June continues to serve in the Republic's military, rekindles her friendship with Tess, and briefly dates Anden; while Day, now known by his given name, Daniel, leaves the Republic to accompany Eden (who is going to university in Antarctica) and attend military academy in Antarctica after the latter has regained his eyesight. Ten years after the invasion, June is about to have dinner with Tess when she hears Day and Eden are coming back. As she dashes her hope to meet Day, June stumbles on him and Eden, realizing that Tess has made them reunite. Day stops June, thinking he recognizes her. He begins to recover some memories, though they are scattered. He wants to know her further and introduces himself, an action foreshadowed in Prodigy.

== Characters ==
June Iparis: A sixteen-year-old prodigy, who scored a 1500 (the maximum score) on her Trial. She decides at the end of the book to not tell Day whom she is, thinking that his suffering and pain is caused by her. When he appears dying, she pleas for his survival. She then lets go of Day, telling herself that it is for the best. She is good at appealing to other's emotions and understanding people's backgrounds, as well as observing things around her. In the epilogue, Day and June meet again, when they are both twenty-seven, and re-introduce themselves in hopes of becoming friends again.

Daniel Altan "Day" Wing: A sixteen-year-old boy who was experimented on by the Republic at the age of ten. During the ending sequence, he is shot twice. He ends up in a coma for five months, as he also needs surgery on his hippocampus. He is also a prodigy but is mostly considered the "Legend" and "Champion" of the Republic, who also scores a 1500 as well, but he didn't know this. Throughout the book, he experiences several excruciatingly painful headaches, which comes from the experiments on him that happed when he ‘failed’ his trial. In Prodigy, Day broke up with June as he thought she shouldn't be with a dying man but they rekindle their relationship in Champion after almost a year of being apart.

Eden Bataar Wing: Day's younger brother, who Day will do anything to protect. Day is adamant of not letting the Republic experiment on Eden again, but Eden agrees to do it. Eden was very sick from the plague.

Captain Thomas Alexander Bryant: A very loyal soldier to the Republic; however he is too loyal and follows his commander's orders exactly, which results in placing him as a traitor in an assassination plot against the Elector. Thomas killed his love interest and June's brother, Metias Iparis, after kissing him. He is killed by the soldiers of the Colonies.

Anden Stavropoulos: The young leader/elector of the Republic who is attracted to June. By the end of the novel (epilogue), Anden is leading the Republic in a new era of peace. In the epilogue, he even dates June for four years, before they eventually separate.

Tess: An orphan girl whom Day took in, and is becoming attracted to Day. She joins the Patriot organization as a Medic-in-training. Later on, when she receives the plague, a cure made from June's blood helps save her. She and June become friends by the end of the novel. In the epilogue, she is responsible for making Day and June reunite.

Commander Natasha Jameson: An important antagonist in the series who is a murderer and attempted to kill Anden, Day and June. Her orders to Thomas were the reason why June's brother, Metias, was killed. She shoots Day and, not long after, is shot by Republic soldiers on June's command.

Pascao: A member of the Patriots, and leader of the Runners.

Chancellor of the Colonies: The antagonist of the story. He commands the Colonies and wages war against the Republic.

== Reception ==
Critical reception to Champion was favorable and gained a favorable review from the Smithsonian Asian Pacific American Center. Commonsensemedia gave the work four stars, writing that "Action-packed sci-fi series reaches rousing conclusion." Publishers Weekly gave the work a starred review, comparing Lu to Charlotte Brontë.
