= Emily Berrington =

English actress

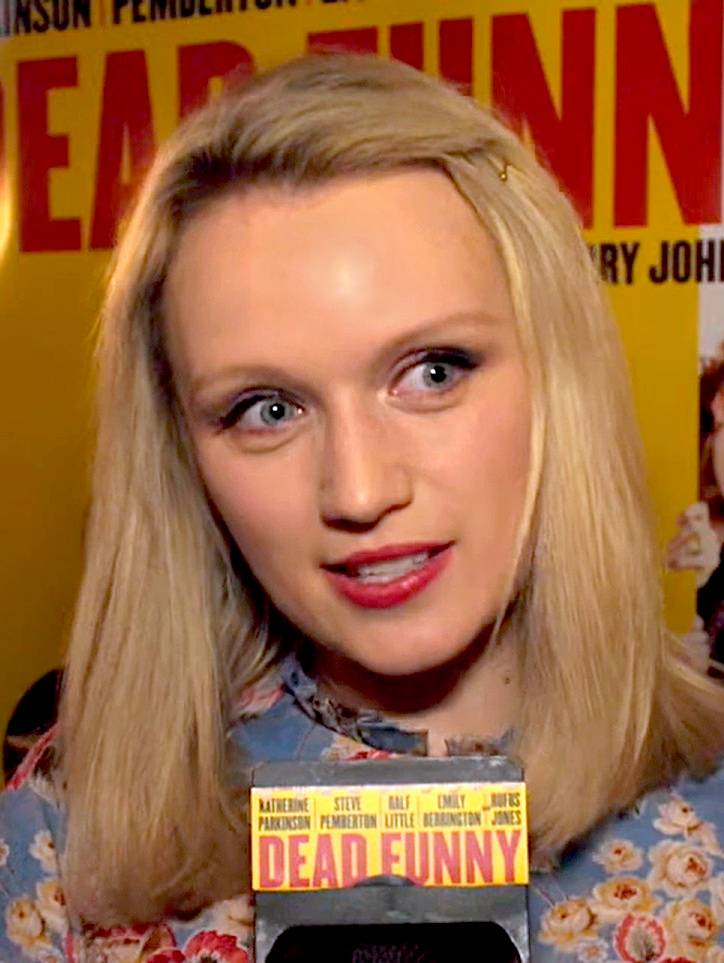
- Berrington at Dead Funny 2016
- Born: 7 December 1985 (age 40); Oxford, Oxfordshire, England
- Education: King's College London
- Occupation: Actress
- Years active: 2013–present
- Height: 5 ft 6 in (168 cm)
- Spouse: Ben Lloyd-Hughes (m. 2019)
- Children: 3

Emily Berrington (born 7 December 1985) is an English actress who played Simone Al-Harazi in 24: Live Another Day (2014) and Niska in the Channel 4 and AMC TV series Humans (2015–2018).

== Early life ==
Berrington's parents were social workers. She has three siblings: Amy, a professor in the United States; Tom, who works for IMG in Abu Dhabi; and Katie, who was a writer for Vogue before becoming the Senior Editor of Net-a-Porter's magazine Porter. Berrington attended Cheney School and later studied development geography at King's College London.

== Career ==
Berrington was involved in youth drama but pursued a career in politics, working at the House of Commons for Labour Party MP Siobhain McDonagh of the London constituency of Mitcham and Morden. In 2009 she won a place studying acting at the Guildhall School of Music and Drama, graduating in 2012.

While studying there she had a part in the Almeida Theatre's production of Children's Children, and also in Michael Winterbottom's The Look of Love.

In 2013 she starred as Jane Shore in the period drama The White Queen, and in 2014 she appeared as Stacey in the BBC sitcom Outnumbered and as Simone Al-Harazi in the thriller series 24: Live Another Day. Her character in 24 had been planned to appear in two episodes, but that was expanded to seven. Her first major supporting film role came in the 2014 comedy film The Inbetweeners 2.

Between 2015 and 2018, in 24 episodes over three seasons, she portrayed Niska in Channel 4's TV series Humans.

From 2017 to 2020 she played Chloe in Richard Herring's sitcom Relativity on BBC Radio 4.

== Filmography ==
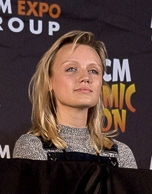
Emily Berrington at the 2015 MCM London Comic Con

Film
Year	Title	Role	Notes
2013	The Look of Love	Clare	Uncredited role
2014	The Inbetweeners 2	Katie Evans	
2014	The Last Showing	Allie	
2017	The Hippopotamus	Jane Swann	
2022	The Stranger in Our Bed	Charlotte	

Television
Year	Title	Role	Notes
2013	The White Queen	Jane Shore	3 episodes
2014	Outnumbered	Stacey	Recurring role (season 5)
2014	24: Live Another Day	Simone Al-Harazi	Recurring role
2015	Sons of Liberty	Margaret Kemble Gage	Main role
2015–2018	Humans	Niska	Main role
2017	The Miniaturist	The Miniaturist	Main role
