= Zach King =

American internet personality (born 1990)

Zachary King
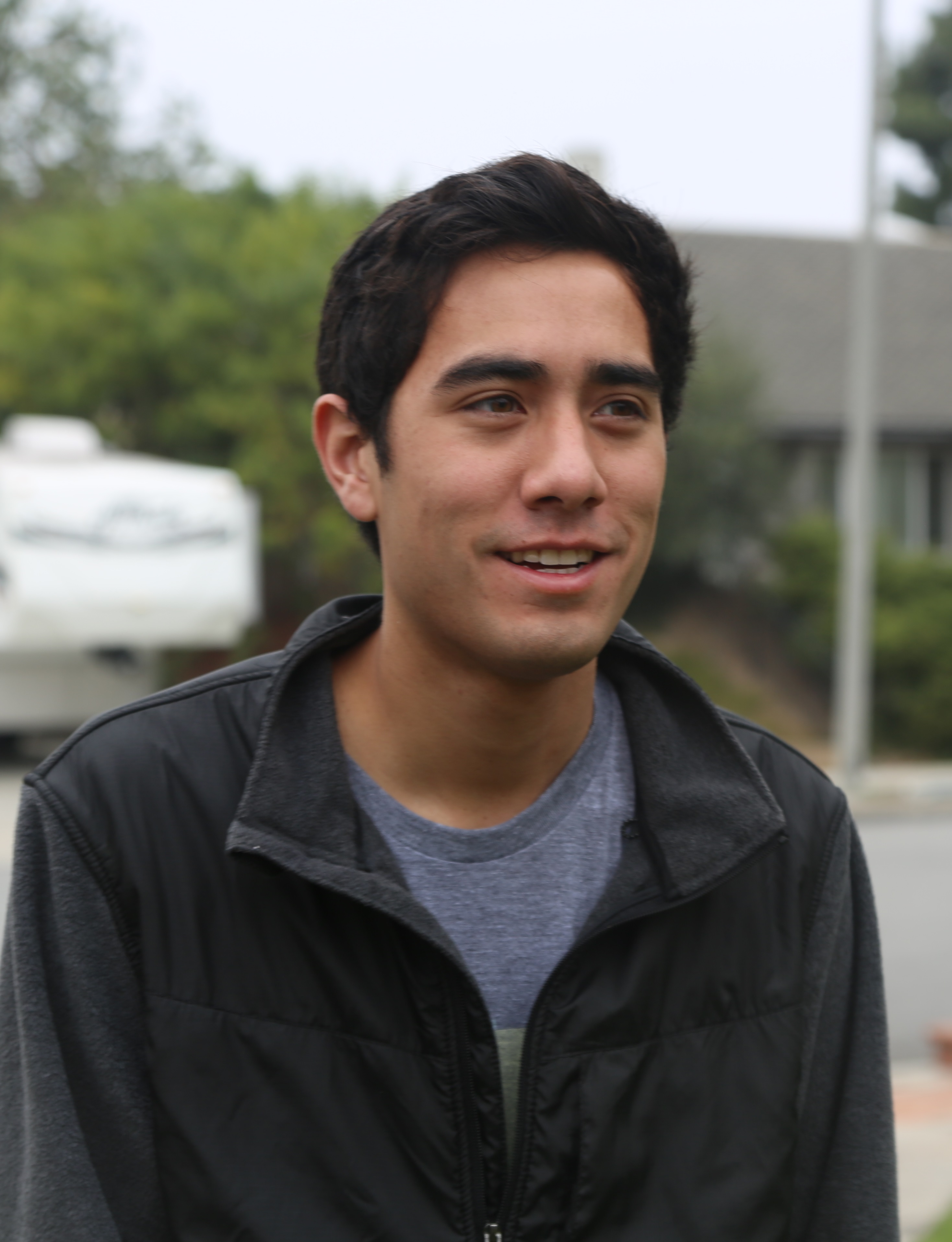
- King in 2013
- Born: Zachary Michael King; February 4, 1990 (age 36); Portland, Oregon, U.S.
- Other name: Final Cut King
- Education: Biola University
- Occupation: Internet personality
- Years active: 2008–present
- Spouse: Rachel Holm (m. 2014)
- Children: 4

TikTok information
- Page: zachking
- Years active: 2016-present
- Followers: 86.7 million

YouTube information
- Channel: Zach King
- Years active: 2008-present (if including FinalCutKing)
- Subscribers: 43.7 million
- Views: 24.1 billion
- Last updated: November 22, 2026

Zachary Michael King (born February 4, 1990) is an American internet personality and filmmaker, known for creating short videos featuring visual effects. He began posting content on YouTube in 2008 and gained widespread recognition on Vine in 2013 for his six-second "magic vines." King later expanded his content creation to TikTok, where he has amassed tens of millions of followers for his digitally edited videos, which he describes as "digital sleight of hand."

== Early life and education ==
Zachary Michael King was born and raised in Portland, Oregon. He is of half-Chinese descent from his paternal side, one-quarter Austrian and one-quarter Nicaraguan descent from his maternal side. King's mother homeschooled him and his three sisters, including one adopted sister, while his father worked in their home office. King made his first film at age seven using a home video camera. When he was fourteen, he purchased video equipment including a Mac computer, cameras, and a tripod and started making and editing videos.

He was a film and music major with a minor in worship at Biola University and graduated in December 2012.

== Career ==
=== Early work and YouTube ===
King started his website, FinalCutKing.com, in 2008 to offer training and tips about using the editing software Final Cut Pro, as he was unable to find tutorials for the software on the internet. At the same time, he started using his YouTube channel to give tutorials for visual effects using the software. After gaining an audience for his website, he began selling training seminars and used the money to help pay his college tuition. He participated as a contestant on an episode of Viral Video Showdown that aired on Syfy in 2012.

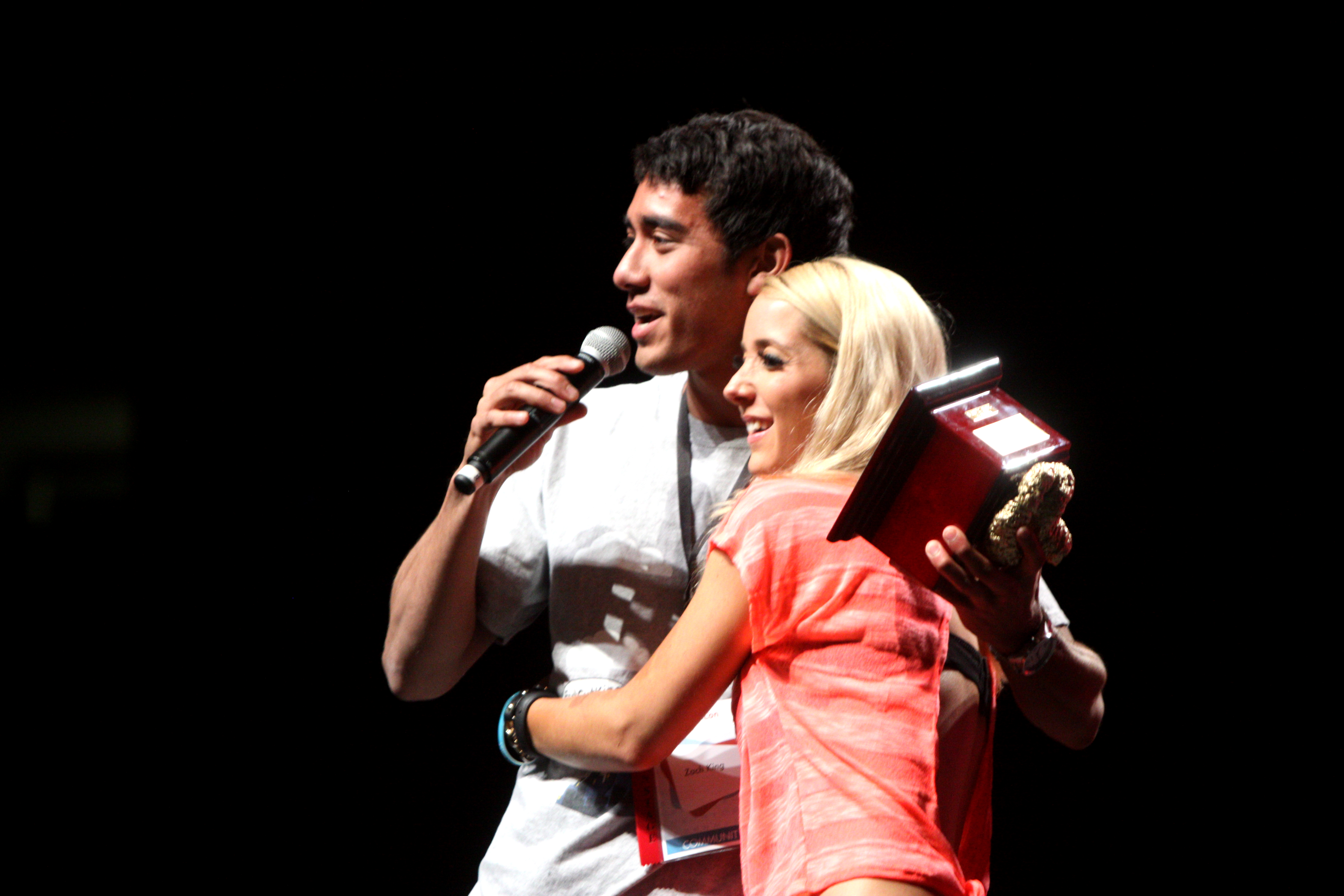
King (left) receiving his Golden Poop Award

In 2011, he posted a video titled Jedi Kittens on YouTube that he produced with a college friend under the name FinalCutKing. The video showed two kittens fighting with lightsabers. The video gained over a million views in three days and went on to have over 25 million views as of March 2025. A sequel of the video titled Jedi Kittens Strike Back gained over 10 million views as of 2014. A third video in the series, Jedi Kittens – The Force Awakens, was posted in 2013 and has gained over 28 million views.

He was named by YouTube as one of the 25 most promising young film-makers in America in May 2013. As part of its Next Up Creators contest, YouTube awarded King $35,000 as well as a trip to New York City for a four-day YouTube Creator Camp. His submission to the contest was titled Contest Entry Gone Wrong. As of May 2025, he has 42 million subscribers and 775 videos with 21.4 billion views.

King posted a short video as part of YouTube Shorts which gained over 1.2 billion views.

=== Vine ===
King made his Vine account on September 9, 2013, and decided to create one Vine daily for thirty days straight. His videos on the platform quickly became popular. By 2014, he was making videos on Vine full-time and working out of his garage.

King has been featured in multiple media outlets for his Vines. He appeared on The Ellen DeGeneres Show on January 29, 2014, and made several Vines with the crew of the show. Chez Pazienza wrote about King that "this guy's stuff is pure magic (or at least the work of some very clever editing.)" Laura Vitto praised King's work in Mashable, stating, "Vine star and filmmaker Zach King may not perform magic in the traditional sense, but his expertly-edited six-second videos could put David Blaine to shame." Writing for Complex magazine, J. Duaine Hahn wrote, "While people have hit Vine stardom for skits, or splicing together commentary with popular YouTube videos, King has gone the extra mile to use his six seconds to create magic, or the closest thing you can get to it with on a smartphone."

=== TikTok ===
King posted his first video to short-form video platform TikTok (formerly musical.ly) on February 28, 2016. As of November 2024, he has amassed a following of over 82.3 million followers, making him the third most followed user on the site. He has a 25-person staff to help him write and produce videos. His videos can take up to 2 weeks to make, with a goal to produce two per week.

On December 9, 2019, King uploaded a video called "Zach Kings Magic Broomstick", which received an estimated 2 billion views and was the most viewed videos on the platform that day. On December 1, 2022, Guinness World Records officially recognized it as the most viewed video on TikTok at 2.2 billion views.

=== Writing career ===
Zach King has been a published author since 2016. King has three books based on the game Minecraft and a fantasy trilogy starring a self-named protagonist.

King's first book, My Minecraft Escapades, was published on January 21, 2016. A follow-up, Minecraft Mathematicians, was published on March 19, 2016. His third Minecraft book was published on April 10, 2016, and is called A Minecraft Wish Granted.

King then shifted his focus to writing about his own life. King released his "Magic Life" trilogy, a fantasy series based upon his own life and the events that shaped the way he saw magic. Each of the three books have a downloadable app for interacting with each book.

King's first children's book in the Magic Life Series was published on September 16, 2017, and was titled "Zach King: My Magical Life". The second book published was "Zach King: The Magical Mix-Up" on May 1, 2018. King wraps up the trilogy with "Zach King: Mirror Magic".

== Personal life ==
When King was seven, his family converted to Christianity, which he states is one of the "greatest things" that has happened in his life. He considers himself a devout Christian, attempting to read parts of the Bible when he wakes every morning. He is vocal about his faith, even incorporating it into his videos. King attended Biola University, a non-denominational Christian university, and led youth groups at various Christian camps.

King proposed to his girlfriend, Rachel Holm, while pretending to create a video advertisement for one of her brands. They got married in 2014. In 2016, they competed together on The Amazing Race 28 and placed 6th. As of 2017, they lived in Rossmoor, an unincorporated community in Orange County, California. Both King and his wife have adopted siblings, which inspired Rachel to work as a case manager for adoption and foster-care. The couple have an adopted son, Mason, and a biological son, Liam, as well as having fostered children . In 2022, it was announced that the couple was expecting another baby, a girl named Emerson, who was born in February 2023 and later announced on YouTube. In December 2024, it was announced that the couple was expecting another baby, a boy named Carson, who was born in June 2025.

In December 2021, a former employee sued King and his company, King Studio LLC, in Los Angeles County Superior Court. The lawsuit alleged that King had paid the former employee less than male colleagues for similar work and fired her in May 2020 for complaining about the treatment. In filings seeking dismissal of the suit, King's attorneys said that she had been the company's second-highest-paid employee and alleged that she had brought "false claims" after the company declined her proposed contract terms. A judge heard arguments on the motion in August 2026 and took it under submission.

== Filmography ==
Film roles
Year	Title	Director	Role	Notes
2016	Zootopia	No	Muzzled Wolf	Voice only, promotional clip
2018	Would You Fire Me For This?	Co-director	Zach King	Short film
2018	Magic Duel: Jack Black vs Zach King	Yes	Zach King	Short film to promote The House with a Clock in Its Walls featuring Jack Black
2018	A Magician Home Alone	Co-director	Zach King	Short film based on Home Alone featuring Jamie Costa
2019	Viking Academy	Co-director	Zach King	Short film to promote How to Train Your Dragon: The Hidden World featuring Jay Baruchel and America Ferrera
2019	Stranded on Treasure Island	No	Zach King	Short film
2019	Zach King's the Magical Night Before Christmas	Co-director	Zach King	Short film
2020	Zach King's Day Off	Co-director	Zach King	Short film based on Ferris Buller's Day Off featuring Brian Patrick Butler and Nicholas Downs
2021	The Time Traveling Sheriff	No	Zach King	Short film
2021	Pete the Cat	No	Kawow the Magician	Voice only
2022	First to the Gate	Co-director	Zach King	Short film
2022	Stranded Part 2	No	Zach King	Short film
2023	How I Got Cast in Shazam! Fury of the Gods	No	Zach King	Short film to promote Shazam! Fury of the Gods featuring Zachary Levi
2023	Stranded 3	No	Zach King	Short film featuring Terry Crews
2024	Zach King vs Porch Pirates	No	Zach King	Short film featuring Mark Rober and Wayne Brady
2026	Jurassic Bark	No	Alan Grant	Short film based on Jurassic Park featuring Randall Park, Nick DiGiovanni, Adam Rose, etc.
2026	Cardboard Wars	No	Luke Skywalker	Short film based on Star Wars featuring Airrack, Randall Park, Michelle Khare, Jamie Costa, Jordan Matter, Sofie Dossi, Jesser, Nick DiGiovanni, Colin and Samir, etc.
Cardboard Wars II	No	Luke Skywalker	Short film based on Star Wars: The Empire Strikes Back featuring Jamie Costa	

Television roles
Year	Title	Role	Notes
2021	Nickelodeon's Unfiltered	Himself	Episode: "This DJ is Bananas!"
2021	Dave	Himself	Episode: "Somebody Date me"

== Awards and honors ==
- 2009 – First place in student film festival for HP advertisement
- 2009 – Critic's Choice Award at Bridgestone Tires's Safety Scholars Teen Driver Video Contest
- 2010 – First place London Film Festival: Heartbrand Ad
- 2010 – Bridgestone Safety Scholar Winner
- 2012 – Vidcon Golden Poop Award
- 2013 – YouTube's NextUp Creators Contest
- 2016 – Shorty Award for Best Vine Artist
- 2023 – Streamy Award for Visual and Special Effects
