= Prodigy (novel) =

2013 book by Marie Lu

- Author: Marie Lu
- Language: English
- Series: Legend series
- Genre: Dystopian, young adult, romance
- Publisher: G. P. Putnam's Sons
- Publication date: January 29, 2013
- Publication place: United States
- Media type: Print (hardcover and paperback), audiobook, e-book
- Pages: 371 pp.
- ISBN: 978-0-399-25676-9
- OCLC: 779740220
- LC Class: PZ7.L96768 Pro 2012
- Preceded by: Legend
- Followed by: Champion

Prodigy is a 2013 dystopian young adult romance novel written by American author Marie Lu. It is the second book of a trilogy, preceded by Legend and followed by Champion.

== Plot ==
After the events of Legend, June Iparis and Daniel "Day" Altan Wing arrive at Las Vegas in search for the Patriots. Through Kaede, they meet with Tess and Andrew "Razor" DeSoto, a Republic Commander doubling as the leader of the Patriots. Razor offers Day a prosthetic leg and protection in exchange for assassinating the new Elector Primo, Anden Stavropoulos, who has recently succeeded his deceased father. To execute the task, June will need an audience with Anden at Denver to falsify the time and place of the assassination and convince him to seek "protection" at the actual place of assassination.

Accepting the offer, June lets herself get captured by a Republic task group led by Thomas Bryant. She learns that he and her brother, Metias, were in love with each other. June successfully makes an appointment with Anden, but she becomes reluctant to execute the plan when she realizes that the reformist Anden has little in common with the conservative Senate and wants to change the Republic for the better. She decides to abandon the plot and signals to Day through a security camera about her decision of betrayal to the Patriots. Meanwhile, Day boards a Republic airship towards the warfront city of Lamar, where one of the Patriots' bases is located. Day learns about the current situation of the international world–the fact that the Republic is considered a pariah state–and further hones his skills to become a Runner, the Patriots' diversion team. He is confessed by Tess, who warns him not to trust June. One night, while creating a diversion at a local train station, Day meets a boy experimented to be a biological war weapon like Eden and wasn't able to free him.

On the day of assassination, June fails to avert the sequence of the plan, but Day makes up for this by rescuing Anden from the bombers, having finally decided to trust June. Day hides inside the tunnels with June through Kaede's knowledge. He lashes out at June for her sudden decision, though he ultimately mellows out and is taught self-defense arts from her. Seeing that June is infected by the Republic's virus, Day carries her further across the sewers until they cross the border and arrives at a city of the Colonies, which turns out to be a corporate state ruled by several major companies.

Seeking refuge at a hospital, Day meets with Kaede and is informed that the botched assassination attempt was deliberate; the Patriots had been deceived by Razor, who in truth works for several Republic Senators to assassinate Anden, whom they deem to be revolutionary; should Anden lose the faith of the masses, Razor will ascend to the Elector Primo position. She also points out that the Republic and the Colonies are two sides of the same coin, as the Colonies, through their strict corporatism, punishes the poor and rewards the rich even more than the Republic does. Day, June, and Kaede flee as Colonial soldiers pursue them; heading across the war zone straight towards Denver in a jet, though Kaede is killed in the process. Day successfully reaches the City Hall and pledges his support for Anden. Thanks to this, Anden gains the trust of the masses and manages to command the Army to capture Razor, the traitorous Senators, and most of their supporters.

While he is reunited with the now-blind Eden, Day is diagnosed with a terminal illness due to the Republic's experimentation on him five years prior. Meanwhile, June is offered by Anden a training program for the position of Senator Princeps–the head of the Senate. She meets with Day after his release from the hospital, only to find out that Day, not wanting his illness to hinder June's future, plans to distance himself from her. He quickly leaves the apartment, but not before giving the agonized June a parting kiss.

== Characters ==
- June Iparis, the Republic's fifteen year old prodigy who scored a perfect 1500 on her Trial, the Republic's mandatory test system. Born into an elite family, her parents were mysteriously killed in a car crash, leaving Metias, her older brother, to care for her. When Metias is murdered and Day is the prime suspect, June sets out to find him but ends up slowly falling in love with Day. Her first encounter with Day was a ruse to find out his true identity, only seeking revenge for her brother's death. She's very analytical and smart, able to keenly survive on the streets, and a bit of an uptight person. She has long, dark brown hair usually tied back in a high ponytail. She has dark brown eyes with golden flecks in them.
- Daniel 'Day' Altan Wing, the sixteen year old legend born in the slums of the Republic. Day is the Republic's most-wanted criminal and the prime suspect of Metias's murder. He is a mix between Mongolian/Caucasian with long, light blond hair and bright blue eyes. He also has a limp in his left leg and an "imperfection" (a lighter patch of blue) in one eye from when the Republic experimented on him. Day is described as being extremely agile, even more so than June. He, like June, is confident and stubborn. He also scored a perfect 1500 during his Trial, but was lied to from the Republic, being told he scored 674 (45%). In Prodigy, Day has his injured leg replaced by a mostly metal prosthesis, and he also discovers that he has a terminal illness. When June is sent to find him, he falls in love with June even though he doesn't know her.
- Metias Iparis, Metias pronounced "meh-TAY-us" (according to a Twitter post from Marie Lu on May 18, 2012) was June's older brother who was killed early in the previous novel. He was murdered by Thomas, who was acting on orders from Commander Jameson. He was twenty-seven when he died, and had dark hair and eyes like June. Metias was a brilliant hacker who turned away from the Republic after making several shocking discoveries.
- Thomas, Metias's old friend who acted like he was in love with June (and tries to kiss her) and has a special hatred against Day. It is later indicated that Thomas was Metias's murderer. June comes to believe that her brother was in love with Thomas, but does not know if the feeling was reciprocated.
- Eden Bataar Wing, Day's 10 year old younger brother who caught a mutated version of the plague. In Prodigy, Eden to be used as a biological weapon. The new Elector releases Eden and is no longer required to take the Trial, but he has lost his sight.
- John Suren Wing, Day's older brother who was killed at the end of Legend by the Republic's firing squad in a sacrifice to save both Day and June.
- Commander Jameson, June's hard-core commander and sort of another parent to June, being that June's brother and parents are dead. In Prodigy it is revealed that Jameson was working with the head of the Patriots to remove the new Elector.
- Tess, Day's thirteen-year-old partner in crime and caretaker. Tess was abandoned by her parents and taken in by Day when she was only ten. She goes missing after Day is taken into custody by June but is later discovered to have joined the Patriots. In Prodigy, Tess is working to become a Medic. Tess also developed a crush on Day, and her jealousy and suspicion of June add tension to her relationship with Day, who views her more as a sibling than someone he could be interested in romantically.
- Chian, Los Angeles's head Trial administrator. He administered June's and Day's Trial and used to be Metias's mentor.
- Kaede, A Patriot known to be involved in 'Skiz' fights. She helps Day and June escape the Republic after June pays her a large sum of money. It is revealed Kaede was a Colonies fighter pilot who was let go after harming an abusive peer. She insists she's in it for the money, but at points implies she just wants unity in North America. She is shot and killed upon crashing a Colonies jet into Denver.
- Ollie, June's loyal white shepherd dog who helps coax her through the tragic period of Metias' death. Thomas uses Ollie to search for June in Prodigy, and at the end of the story she is reunited with him.
- Senator Kamion, A Senator in the Republic government who opposes the new Elector.
- Anden Stavropoulos, After the death of his father, Anden became the new Elector, the head of the Republic. However, Anden's positions on many policies differed vastly from his father, and the Republic Senate sought to have him removed. It is shown that he is romantically interested in June.
- Baxter, A Patriot Runner who bullies Day because he trusts June (Baxter believes that June is a double agent). He was also thought to have some relationship with Tess, but ended it after Day and Baxter had a fight.
- Pascao, The undisputed leader of the Patriot Runners.
- Dr. Sadhwani, She performs the lie detector test on June, which she narrowly passed.
- Commander Andrew "Razor" DeSoto, Leader of the Patriots, but also a former Republic soldier. Razor instrumented a plan to remove the Elector Anden for the Republic Senate, whereupon he would be made the new Elector.

== Reception ==
The novel has been warmly received by critics. In The Los Angeles Times, Sara Scribner wrote, "Marie Lu has beaten the curse with 'Prodigy,' the second book in the 'Legend' series...Unlike 'The Hunger Games,' which delivers its adrenaline rush by giving kids bows and arrows, this series' power is derived through its layered atmospheres and the way its characters reflect and fight their worlds — and one another. With 'Prodigy,' Lu proves that a Book Two needn't play second fiddle, providing intrigue and deep pleasure all its own." The trade publication Publishers Weekly gave Prodigy a starred review. "June and Day were once divided by ignorance and circumstance; now they are held apart by principle and choice. The portrayal of their dilemma is taut and insightful, and while the story line resembles a high plateau of tension rather than a conventional arc, there are enough unfolding questions to propel the narrative to its aching ending." Kirkus Reviews also gave the novel a favorable review, writing that "The pathos of Day and June's erstwhile romance shines through without detracting from the tension of their rebellion; both riveting action and entertaining characterization keep their quest engaging." Legend also went to number two on The New York Times Best Seller list, underneath The Fault in Our Stars.
