= Legend (Lu novel) =

2011 novel by Marie Lu

- Front cover of the first U.S. edition
- Author: Marie Lu
- Language: English
- Series: Legend series
- Genre: Dystopian, young adult, science fiction, romance
- Publisher: G. P. Putnam's Sons, Penguin Books
- Publication date: November 29, 2011
- Publication place: United States
- Media type: Print (hardcover and paperback), audiobook, e-book
- Pages: 305
- ISBN: 978-0-399-25675-2
- OCLC: 703209165
- LC Class: PZ7.L96768 Leg 2011
- Followed by: Prodigy

Legend is a 2011 dystopian young adult romance novel written by American author Marie Lu. It is the first book in the Legend series followed by Prodigy, Champion, and Rebel. Lu draws inspiration from events and experiences throughout her life and media she has consumed such as the film Les Miserables.

== Background ==
Published by Penguin Young Readers Group under the Putnam imprint in November 2011, Legend is Marie Lu's first published work. Lu drew inspiration from several sources while writing this novel. One of her biggest inspirations was Les Misérables, basing her characters of Day and June on the police inspector Javert and ex-convict Jean Valjean in the film. In an interview with Judith Pereira from The Globe and Mail, Lu explained that watching Les Misérables drew her to adapt the criminal versus detective narrative to make it a teen version.

Additionally, Lu drew inspiration from events in East Asia such as the Eugenics movement in early 20th century Korea and the Tiananmen Square Massacre in China. In an interview with the School Library Journal, Lu revealed that her experiences while living in China and being at Tiananmen Square hours before the massacre indirectly shaped the novel by changing the way she saw things.

Furthermore, Lu was inspired by her life in the United States. She notes that she drew inspiration from the SATs when creating the nationwide test both June and Day had to take in the novel. Also, she chose Los Angeles as the setting for the novel since she lives there and she thought Los Angeles demonstrates the dramatic economic disparity between the wealthy and poor that is further illustrated in the novel.

== Plot ==
Legend is set in a flooded, fortified, and futuristic version of Los Angeles, ruled by the totalitarian Republic of America. The novel centers around Daniel "Day" Altan Wing and June Iparis, two 15-year-olds on opposite sides of the economic spectrum. June Iparis is a military prodigy, born into an elite family, and groomed for success in the Republic's highest circles. She is the only person to have ever scored full marks on the Trial (aside from Day, but he was denied fame), a comprehensive test administered at age 10 to determine the child's future role in society. Her parents died several years before the start of the story, so she is raised by her older brother Metias. Daniel "Day" Wing is an infamous wanted criminal, born in the impoverished slums of the Republic. His family believes he is dead, apart from his older brother John.

Day learns that his younger brother, Eden, is infected with the Plague, a disease that periodically ravages sectors of the Republic. Day breaks into the city hospital to steal medicine and escapes after a confrontation with Metias. Later that night, June is informed by Thomas, an officer in the Republic and Metias's childhood friend, that her brother was murdered by Day. June graduates early from her military university and sets out to catch Day. Using the promise of a cure for Eden's infection, she lures Day to the site of one of his previous heist locations, and they converse, albeit not face-to-face, before Day realizes she is a Republic agent.

June poses as another person from the sector searching for Day. She gets in a street fight, stepping in for Tess, and beats the previous champion, Kaede. June is stabbed in the process. Day rescues June, unaware of her identity, and Tess, a friend of Day's, sets about healing June. Day and June begin to develop romantic feelings for each other, eventually culminating in a kiss, but June realizes who he is and reports his family's location to Thomas and the Republic. Day attempts to defend his family's house from Republic soldiers, but Thomas kills his mother and Day is captured.

As June questions Day, he insists he is innocent of Metias's murder. June reviews Day's files and discovers he got a perfect score on the Trial, like June herself. However, instead of Day being celebrated as a prodigy, the Republic falsified records to indicate Day failed his Trial and died in a labor camp. While Day is being moved to a new cell, he sees evidence that the Republic is intentionally spreading the Plague. Day is further tortured by Commander Jameson and sentenced to death.

June informs Day that John is in a cell and Eden has been sent to labs on the war front. Day tells June about painful tests inflicted on him after supposedly failing the Trial. Children sent to "work camps" are actually killed or used for experimentation in laboratories; Day escaped after being left for dead. Day tells June his theory about the origins of the Plague. Later, protestors gather in support of Day; June watches Thomas order his soldiers to fire on the protestors.

That night, June determines that Metias was actually murdered by Thomas, under the orders of Commander Jameson. Metias left a coded message for June, revealing that their parents were murdered for discovering the true purposes of the Plague: a method of culling the weaker Republic populations, and a biological weapon against the Colonies. June decides to break Day and John out.

June and the Patriots plot an escape plan, but Jameson moves up the execution date. June attempts to rescue Day and John on her own but is arrested by Thomas. Their confrontation is halted by attacking Patriots, and June escapes with Day in the chaos; John sacrifices himself to allow June and Day to escape, and the Republic, having mistaken John for Day, claims that Day has been executed. Day and June decide to head to the war front labs to rescue Eden and then escape into the Colonies.

== Characters ==
- June Iparis, a fifteen-year-old military prodigy who scored a perfect 1500 on her Trial, the Republic's mandatory test system. Born into an elite Republic family, her parents were mysteriously killed in a car crash, leaving Metias, her older brother, to care for her. She is described as extremely analytical and clever, able to keenly survive on the streets, and a bit of an uptight person. She is also said to be very attractive and has long, dark brown hair usually tied back in a high ponytail, as well as dark brown eyes with golden flecks in them.
- Daniel "Day" Altan Wing, a fifteen-year-old rebellious criminal was born in the slums of the Republic. Day is the Republic's most-wanted criminal. He is of mixed race heritage (from a Mongolian father and a Caucasian mother) with long, light blond hair and luminous baby blue eyes. He has a limp in his left leg and an "imperfection" (a lighter patch of blue) in one eye from when the Republic experimented on him. Day is described as being extremely agile, even more so than June. He, like June, is confident and stubborn. He also scored a perfect 1500 during his Trial, meaning that he is also a prodigy, but was lied to by the Republic, being told he scored 674 (45%).
- Thomas Alexander Bryant, Metias's friend who is infatuated with June and has a special hatred of Day because June had kissed him. He was born in the slums, but clawed his way through the hierarchy to become a lieutenant and later captain of the Republic's army.
- Metias Iparis, June's older brother. Like her, he has brown hair and eyes with flecks of gold in it. Metias was murdered one night while guarding plague medicine. He was twenty-seven when he died, being 12 years older than June.
- Commander Jameson, Metias' hardcore military commander who gains June an early graduation from Drake, so June can join Jameson's squad. Her skill, experience, and ruthlessness as a soldier are regularly mentioned.
- Tess, Day's thirteen-year-old partner in crime and caretaker. Tess was abandoned by her parents and taken in by Day when she was only ten. She is described as having tan skin, large brown eyes, and reddish hair.
- Kaede, A Patriot known to be involved in 'Skiz' (illegal fights) (June and Kaede fight one of these around the beginning of the story). She helps Day and June escape Batalla Hall.
- Eden Bataar Wing, Day's ten-year-old brother who is infected with a mutated version of the plague and is used by the Republic as a lab rat to develop a biological weapon in the war against the Colonies, who they are at war with. Day describes him as acting like a 'little engineer'.
- John Wing, Day's nineteen-year-old brother, who looks very similar to him. At the opening of Legend, he is the only person from Day's old life who knew he was still alive. He is killed by the Republic's firing squad in a sacrifice to save both Day and June in a life-threatening situation.
- Grace Wing, Day's mother. Thomas is ordered by Commander Jameson to shoot Day's mother in the head during the raid on the Wings' home. Day and his siblings inherited their blond hair and blue eyes from her.
- Michael and Nadia Iparis, June's parents who are allegedly killed in a car accident. They are later revealed to have been murdered by the government.

== Genre ==
Legend is a Young Adult Science Fiction Dystopian Romance novel. Typical of the Young Adult genre, Legend has a female protagonist. 65% of Young Adult books feature young female protagonists according to the Geena Davis Institute. Young Adult fiction is classified as easy to follow without being overly simplified, allowing all age groups to enjoy it.

In character with the Science fiction genre that features no historical constraints and is set in the future, Legend is set in futuristic Los Angeles where an artificially created virus scavenges the nation. Dystopian Young Adult novels feature societies that highlight political or moral lessons or warnings through their corrupt characteristics; Lu's society in Legend serves as a political warning of the turmoils a stark divide in upper and lower classes creates in society.

== Analysis ==
The dystopian setting of Legend is a commentary on wealth inequality in the world. Lu stated that she chose Los Angeles as the setting in the novel particularly because it is a location with rampant wealth inequality. She commented that in Los Angeles, "The fact that you can go down the street and you run into a wealthy neighborhood. Then two blocks later, it's a really poor street. It's very extreme and I think that is kind of symbolic for Legend where there is no middle class."

Although their romantic involvement is not revealed until later in the series, there are two LGBTQ+ characters in the novel - Metias and Thomas. In an interview with Everdeen Mason from The Washington Post, Lu states that she wished she included more LGBTQ+ representation in the novel, aside from solely Thomas and Metias, since this limited representation solely allows LGBTQ+ readers to relate to either Metias' or Thomas' respective characterizations as a dead brother or an antagonist.

== Reception ==
Susan Carpenter, writing in the Los Angeles Times calls Legend "a taut and exciting romp for all readers with enough inventive details to keep things from becoming cliché", and The New York Times' Ridley Pearson called it "[a] fine example of commercial fiction with razor-sharp plotting, depth of character and emotional arc." In the University Wire, SUNY Oneota student Claudia Corneyea reviewed the novel, writing, “This novel has everything a young adult dystopia is expected to have: an avenging heroine, a loving bad boy and a corrupt government that brings them together.”

A review in Bookmarks magazine has a mixed position on the book citing the rapidly moving plot as enticing but has draw backs because they believe that the characters are not fully formed. Elizabeth McDonnell's review in the Boston Examiner, agrees with the fast paced plot makes the book an appealing read, but points the clichés present as negative aspects of the book.

== Adaptations ==
=== Canceled films ===
Legend's film rights have been sold to Lionsgate, with Twilight producers Wyck Godfrey and Marty Bowen to produce. In January 2013, MTV reported that Jonathan Levine, though initially attached as director, had dropped out of the film. Godfrey stated, "We have a fantastic script, and we had Jonathan Levine who directed Warm Bodies, but because he had just done a YA book, he's kinda like, 'I've got to do something different.' So we're in the process of putting a director on Legend. Whoever gets that is going to be excited because the world-building for that is a blast." Producers are in the process of attaching a new director to the film. That same month, it was reported that Andrew Barrer and Gabe Ferrari have completed the script.

In July 2018, it was announced that the film and television rights have been acquired by BCDF Pictures with Joseph Muszynski hired to write the script. Lu stated that she is happy with the current script as it stays true to the novel. Claude Dal Farra, Brice Dal Farra, and Brian Keady serve as producers from BCDF Pictures, while Irfaan Fredericks of Kalahari Film & Media will co-produce the project.

=== Television series ===
In November 2021, it was announced that Bound Entertainment would be adapting the novel as a television series. Lu is to write the pilot with Lindsay Sturman. Bound Entertainment's Samuel Yenuju Ha and Jamie Lai are set as executive producers. It was also announced that Day and June would be aged up to eighteen instead of fifteen, cast is yet to be announced.

=== Graphic novel ===
A graphic novel adaptation of Legend was published on April 25, 2015, by Penguin Group (USA) LLC. An adaptation of the second novel, Prodigy, was slated to be published on April 26, 2016. A third and final adaptation of Champion was released on April 25, 2017. The adaptations are written by Leigh Dragoon and illustrated by Caravan Studio.
