= My Crazy Ex =

- Genre: Reality
- No. of seasons: 5
- No. of episodes: 44 (and 1 special)

Original release
- Network: LMN
- Release: June 23, 2014 – September 24, 2018

My Crazy Ex is an American reality storytelling television series on LMN. This show tells the true stories of people who imagine themselves lucky in love, but their relationships eventually spiral out of control, and they find themselves in desperate search of escape. It can be difficult to see the difference between being in love or being given attention by a person who is habitually charming.

== Episodes ==
Season	Episodes	Originally released	
Season	Episodes	First released	Last released
1	9	June 23, 2014	May 27, 2015
2	11	December 30, 2015	April 13, 2016
3	5	June 30, 2016	July 28, 2016
Special		July 6, 2016	
4	13	December 28, 2016	September 18, 2017
5	6	September 24, 2018	

=== Season 1 (2014–15) ===
No. overall	No. in season	Title	Original release date
1	1	"Flipped, Followed & Framed"	June 23, 2014
A seemingly harmless one-night stand has dangerous consequences. A woman is arrested for armed robbery shortly after an ugly breakup. Lies are revealed when a woman secretly follows her fiancé to an underground nightclub.
2	2	"Clocking In, Freaking Out and Falling Down"	April 1, 2015
A slacker salesman falls for a beautiful co-worker with high expectations. A newly single woman falls for a neighbor with an unnatural obsession. A bachelor finds himself in a sticky situation with a sweet Southern Belle.
3	3	"Covered, Conned and Cloned"	April 8, 2015
A handyman's fetish puts a dangerously public spin on a relationship. A romance kindled at a dog park leads to an unhealthy turn for man and pooch alike. Two best friends fall for brothers with serious baggage.
4	4	"Shocked, Rocked and Spooked"	April 15, 2015
A clueless bartender is outmatched by a deranged customer who refuses to take no for an answer. A wife's thoughtful gift rocks her marriage. A single guy falls for a gamer girl with a penchant for pain.
5	5	"Duped, Doped and Delirious"	April 22, 2015
A woman refuses to accept that her recent ex is terrorizing her. A woman tries to smoke out the truth about her mysterious old flame. A guy's relationship with his personal trainer brings him to his knees. Note: Episode was also known as Til Death Do Us Part.
6	6	"Prisons, Pros and Princes"	April 29, 2015
A newly single man becomes a prisoner of love. A husband learns his librarian wife might be checking out more than just books. A bachelorette finds dating a prince a royal pain.
7	7	"Sex, Laws and Medical Tape"	May 7, 2015
An old college flame's reappearance heats things up for a married couple. An average guy feels the sting of his pain-obsessed girlfriend. A construction worker gives new meaning to the term "love hurts."
8	8	"Slander, Dander and Pander"	May 20, 2015
A businesswoman's world is rocked when she hires the former high school jock. A woman's new boyfriend hides a wild obsession. A single woman finally meets her match.
9	9	"Deranged, Changed and Arranged"	May 27, 2015
A woman falls for a guy with a frightening obsession. A barista's new girlfriend grinds him into something new. A woman falls for a family man, in the truest sense of the word.

=== Season 2 (2015–16) ===
No. overall	No. in season	Title	Original release date
10	1	"Scrooged, Used & Abused"	December 30, 2015
Deck the halls and buckle up, in the season's premiere of My Crazy Ex(mas), a Christmas celebration turns less than merry when Maggie finds herself sitting in cuffs right next to her boyfriend: Santa Claus. Later, Samantha wants to apologize to her sister but wonders how much paper it takes to giftwrap her makeup present (a new boyfriend)... And finally, Vivian rushes in at the last minute to save her boyfriend who literally believes in giving till it hurts.
11	2	"Seething, Thieving & Teething"	January 6, 2016
Fix up leads to break up when an industrious couple's remodel demolishes their relationship. A wild woman drives her shy boyfriend over the edge. A waitress throws the baby out with the bathwater when she discovers her boyfriend's secret.
12	3	"Crackpots, Jackpots & Flower Pots"	January 13, 2016
A community organizer turns fist-fighting warrior for the love of a woman. An unsuspecting woman believes she's hit the jackpot with her entrepreneur boyfriend. A needy mother comes between a woman and the man she loves.
13	4	"Exposed, De-clothed & Seriously Hosed"	January 20, 2016
Social media circles its wagons against a man on the wrong side of a breakup. A healthy lifestyle has unhealthy consequences for a couple's relationship. A frequent flyer takes a turbulent ride with a tyrannical flight attendant.
14	5	"Sexed, Perplexed and Unfortunate Texts"	January 27, 2016
Accidentally crashing a costume party unmasks a couple's hidden issues. A man falls for a food truck owner on a crash course for Crazy town. The office beauty mysteriously falls for the nerdy IT guy.
15	6	"Psychotic, Neurotic, and Auto Erotic"	February 3, 2016
A trusting woman gets taken for the ride of her life by a freaky admirer. A man fights to save his relationship when it becomes clear that someone is out to sabotage it. A woman starts dating an advocate for the disabled, only to realize he's hiding a dark secret.
16	7	"Vexed, Hexed & Artfully Sexed"	March 16, 2016
A woman desperately tries to save her relationship when a psychic predicts it will end badly. An Iowa farm boy gets his first dose of big city dating life. A woman falls for a starving artist, but begins to suspect he might actually be a con artist.
17	8	"Camera Plants, Patriotic Rants and Yoga Pants"	March 23, 2016
A woman's plan to make her timid boyfriend more assertive backfires in a blaze of glory. Overly affectionate siblings muddy the water for a couple of unsuspecting florists. A woman thinks she's dating a U.S. soldier, but when he starts behaving strangely, she wonders if he may have gone rogue.
18	9	"Sitting, Squatting and Plotting"	March 30, 2016
A man suspects his new pastry chef girlfriend is actually filling her baked goods with something illegal. A woman working for a local charity falls for one of their richest donors, only to discover he's hiding something big. An up-and-coming painter jeopardizes his future in the art world when he falls for his sexy assistant.
19	10	"Sexy Props, Dirty Cops & Covert Ops"	April 6, 2016
When a man's ex-girlfriend becomes his dating coach, he starts loving life, until he ends up in trouble with the law. A woman's fantasy fling with a police officer takes a strange turn when she realizes he might be a crooked cop. A government employee with top-secret info questions his Russian-speaking girlfriend's mysterious motives.
20	11	"Impersonating, Humiliating & Vibrating"	April 13, 2016
When a guy breaks up with a girl whose father appears to be "connected" to the mob, he experiences the terror that comes with crossing the wrong "Family." When a woman gets romantically involved with the handyman who's renovating her guesthouse...she soon becomes suspicious that he is using her property for illegal activity. A gorgeous groupie with mysterious motives threatens to disband a band.

=== Season 3 (2016) ===
No. overall	No. in season	Title	Original release date
21	1	"Falsifying, Mortifying & Electrifying"	June 30, 2016
When an RV deliveryman picks up a panicked bride, her ill-fated wedding leads him on the ride of his life. When a struggling author becomes obsessed with breaking a world record, his girlfriend tries to intervene before he goes too far. A woman regrets convincing her unemployed husband to run for city council when his campaign takes a dirty turn.
22	2	"Hidden Cams, Business Scams & Forest Jams"	July 7, 2016
When a woman falls for her florist, she thinks love is in bloom, but is he interested in her, or not? A man is seduced by his maid until he discovers she's using her cleaning duties for some dirty work. When a woman starts dating her ride-share driver, she soon suspects he may be taking her for more than a ride.
23	3	"Compulsions, Confessions & Obsessions"	July 14, 2016
When a man introduces his girlfriend to his favorite sci-fi TV show, her infatuation quickly turns into a dangerous obsession. When a man starts sleeping with the Boss' niece, he's thrown into a twisted game of sexual blackmail that could cost him more than just his job. An ugly divorce turns uglier when an unlikely villain is revealed.
24	4	"Fumigated, Manipulated and Inseminated"	July 21, 2016
A woman's plan to clean up her slobbish boyfriend backfires; a geeky guy's hot new girlfriend has an ulterior motive; a lady's fiancé begins to believe he can communicate with the dead after he's struck by lightning.
25	5	"Oddballs, Pitfalls & Gutter Balls"	July 28, 2016
A guy's competitive new girlfriend reveals the ugly side of bowling; a woman meets a simple man with a complicated past; a man on the rebound falls for a new gal, who grows strangely jealous of his ex.

=== Special (2016) ===
Title	Original release date
"Extra Hot"	July 6, 2016
One-hour My Crazy Ex special that features the "Best Of" segments from Seasons 1 and 2.

=== Season 4 (2016–17) ===
No. overall	No. in season	Title	Original release date
26	1	"Renegades, Escapades & Masquerades"	December 28, 2016
A high-powered attorney's interoffice romance takes a turn for the worse; a woman falls for a party boy; a threesome ends in an unexpected way.
27	2	"Deceptions, Receptions & Infections"	January 4, 2017
A seemingly down-to-earth bride transforms into a ruthless bridezilla who’ll stop at nothing to have her dream wedding, including a felony. When a woman asks her boyfriend to become more informed about current events, he dives headfirst down a doomsday rabbit hole. When a copy shop owner meets a man in the witness protection program, she soon discovers he’s hiding much more than his identity.
28	3	"Rude Dummies, Ripped Tummies and Lying Hubbies"	January 11, 2017
When a girl accidentally encourages her boyfriend to become a ventriloquist, she uncovers a warped side of him she never knew existed. When a woman tries to get her boyfriend into shape, he becomes unexpectedly devoted to working out…and finds a bizarre way to feed his obsession. When a man starts dating his “Dating Coach” it seems like a perfect match, until he gets the sense that she may be “hands on” with other clients too.
29	4	"Gimmicks, Mimics, and Academics"	January 25, 2017
When a young writing student starts secretly dating the teacher’s assistant, he learns that his private lessons come at a very high price. When a young actress starts dating her famous and eccentric director, he convinces her to reveal more than just her emotions. When a woman gets romantically involved with her favorite radio DJ, she discovers the voice she fell for is much smoother than the man she’s dating.
30	5	"Desperate Measures, Secret Pleasures & Buried Treasures"	February 1, 2017
When a couple befriends new neighbors, she begins to suspect that three’s company and she’s the odd woman out. When a park ranger decides to help a woman unearth her family’s fortune, he discovers there’s more buried in his park than he could have imagined. When a woman starts dating a yoga instructor, she finds out that he may be twisted to his spiritual core.
31	6	"Small Parts, False Starts, and Broken Hearts"	February 8, 2017
Sparks fly when 2 childhood classmates reunite… until everything crashes and burns. After swearing off men, an independent woman meets a sexy mystery man who seems oddly familiar. Group therapy turns into gang warfare when a desperate man attends couples counseling to save his relationship.
32	7	"Super Fans, Alien Shams and Anglo Scams"	September 14, 2017
A man claims he was abducted by aliens; a sportswriter's dream comes true when he begins dating a basketball lover; a woman gets roped into her boyfriend's plan to fool his employers.
33	8	"Illusions, Invasions & Implosions"	September 18, 2017
A woman is prone to accidents after discovering she is a descendant of Harry Houdini. A man's second job as an escaping artist.
34	9	"Panting, Primping and Probing"	September 18, 2017
A woman is shocked by how far her boyfriend will go to become a model; a man is baffled by the growth of his girlfriend's singing telegram business, then uncovers the secret to her success; a woman believes she's met the man of her dreams.
35	10	"Unlucky Breaks, Wedding Cakes and Tummy Aches"	September 18, 2017
A man finds a potato chip that turns his life around; a couple challenges another to lose weight; a man agrees to go to a wedding with his ex, then the weekend turns into a fight for his life.
36	11	"Crusaders, Invaders and Penetrators"	September 18, 2017
A woman fears her boyfriend may choose the military over a life with her; a comic-book artist finds inspiration for a new character in his girlfriend; future in-laws threaten to derail a couple's wedding.
37	12	"Bluffing, Bruising and Balding"	September 18, 2017
Much to his girlfriend's dismay, a man decides to wear a toupee to his high school reunion; a man suspects his girlfriend lost money to gangsters in Las Vegas; a man fears his girlfriend's newfound love of nature may lead to an affair.
38	13	"Bad Blood, Bad Timing, Bad Karma"	September 18, 2017
A couple's families engage in an age-old feud; a man wonders if his dream woman will turn out to be a total nightmare; a man's love of animals leads to a dangerous encounter with a wild beast.

=== Season 5 (2018) ===
No. overall	No. in season	Title	Original release date
39	1	"Freaky Males, Tattoo Tales & Wardrobe Fails"	September 24, 2018
A woman begins dating a bad-boy tattoo artist who claims he's looking to change his life; a local weatherman starts dating a fan with ulterior motives; an author falls for a firefighter and soon discovers his twisted secret.
40	2	"Mortified, Terrified & Stupefied"	September 24, 2018
A couple's plans to prank each other backfire; a young duo believe their new house is haunted; a woman's boyfriend vows to shut down a disruptive sorority that moves in next door.
41	3	"Illusions, Invasions and Implosions"	September 24, 2018
A couple’s simple attempt to save money escalates into a desperate struggle for survival. After discovering he’s related to Harry Houdini, a woman’s accident prone, delusional boyfriend attempts a second career as an escape artist. When a woman allows her boyfriend to tag along on “girl’s night,” she suspects he might have developed an interest in one of her friends… only to discover the truth is much worse.
42	4	"Incriminating, Escalating and Percolating"	September 24, 2018
When a man decides to change careers from lab tech to private eye, his girlfriend discovers that his sudden success hides a sinister secret. While serving on a jury, a guy gets romantically involved with another juror and finds himself torn between voting his conscience or suffering her wrath. After a sweet guy gets recruited by his girlfriend to be a test subject in a psychological experiment, he soon realizes that being a guinea pig can be terrifying.
43	5	"Aspiring, Desiring and Misfiring"	September 24, 2018
A woman decides to let a close friend sleep with her husband to try and get pregnant…but the guy soon suspects her friend might have ulterior motives. A clueless boyfriend tries to reignite his girlfriend’s passion for fashion, but the competitive design world ends up sending her down a dark path. After a woman on the rebound finds a new boyfriend, she soon discovers that he’s hiding an astronomical secret.
44	6	"Scheming, Reaming and Screaming"	September 24, 2018
When a woman moves in with her boyfriend of five months, she learns that some secrets are better left in the dark. A girl dating a former child star, ends up an unwitting pawn when he decides to try and stage a comeback. A man’s dreams come true when he gets funding to direct his first movie, but when the star turns out to be his girlfriend’s ex, the on-set friction threatens to ruin the film.
