= Emily Shaffer =

American actress

- Born: Clarksburg, West Virginia, U.S.
- Education: West Virginia University
- Occupations: Actress, narrator
- Years active: 2011–present
- Spouse: Vance Barber
- Website: emilyshaffer.me

Emily Shaffer is an American film actress, dancer and audiobook narrator.

== Early life and education ==
Shaffer was born in Clarksburg, West Virginia. She attended Robert C. Byrd High School, and graduated from West Virginia University with a degree in Bachelor of Fine Arts, Acting / Minor in Dance.

== Career ==
Shaffer appeared in productions sponsored by Jigsaw Theatre and West Virginia Public Theatre. In 2010 she performed in He’s Coming Up the Stairs at Empire Stage in Fort Lauderdale.

Shaffer got her start acting on television on HBO's How to Make It in America (2011). She was a guest star in the pilot for the NBC series Chicago Med, a spin off of Chicago Fire and Chicago P.D.

She later had theatrical roles at the Gladys G. Davis Theatre and the New York Theatre Workshop. In 2018 she performed in It's a Wonderful Life, staged by Virginia Public Theatre.

== Filmography ==
| Year | Title | Role |
|---|---|---|
| 2009 | Sex & Grammer | Rachel |
| 2011 | How to Make It in America (TV Series) HBO | Brianna |
| 2012 | Covert Affairs (TV Series) | Debbie Green |
| 2013 | Unforgettable (TV Series) | Andrea Weston |
| 2014 | Heather and Andy (Short) | Heather |
| 2015 | Allegiance (TV Series) | Ella Sutton |
| 2015 | Chicago Fire (TV Series) | Dr. Diana Claman |
| 2017 | Law & Order: Special Victims Unit (TV Series) | Jessica Walcott |
| 2018 | NCIS: New Orleans (TV Series) | Leila Addison |
| 2019 | The Good Fight (TV Series) | Sunny De Fina |
| 2019 | FBI (TV Series) | Linda Kennedy |
| 2022 | Blue Bloods (TV Series) | Monique |
| 2026 | Caity | Robin |

== Appearances in commercials ==
- Axe Body Spray (commercial)
- Axe Body Spray (print ad) print model
- First Look LXTV (NBC New York) host
- Doritos (commercial) lead talent

== Audiobooks narration ==
- Vampire Academy: Blood Promise 2010
- Vampire Academy: Spirit Bound 2010
- Vampire Academy: Last Sacrifice 2010
- Bloodlines 2011
- The Golden Lily 2012
- The Indigo Spell 2013
- Gameboard of the Gods 2013
- The Fiery Heart 2013
- The Immortal Crown 2014
- The Ruby Circle 2015
- Silver Shadows 2017
- Minecraft: The Lost Journals 2019
- The Grace Year 2019
- Minecraft: The End 2019
- Light Changes Everything 2020
- Tweet Cute 2020
- Hush 2020
- The Wife Upstairs 2021
- The Project 2021
- All Girls 2021
- The House Uptown 2021
- Trouble Girls 2021
- League of Liars 2022
- Veil 2022
- Minecraft: Mob Squad: Don’t Fear the Creeper 2022
- Moongarden 2023
- Seagarden 2024
- Ashgarden 2024

== Theatre ==
- It’s A Wonderful Life, Mary Bailey, West Virginia Public Theatre
- Human, Frosty, Reading – directed by Jerry Zaks
- Vinegar Tom, Alice, West Virginia University
- Much Ado About Nothing, Beatrice, West Virginia University
- The Seagull, Nina, West Virginia University
