= Vampire Academy (disambiguation) =

Vampire Academy is a series of paranormal romance novels by Richelle Mead.

Vampire Academy may also refer to:

- Vampire Academy (novel), first novel of the series
- Vampire Academy (film), 2014 film based on the novel series
- Vampire Academy (TV series), 2022 TV series based on the novel series
