= Outline of fiction =

Narratives with imaginary elements

The following outline is provided as an overview of and topical guide to fiction:

Fiction is any creative work, chiefly any narrative work, portraying individuals, events, or places that are imaginary or in ways that are imaginary. Fictional portrayals are thus inconsistent with fact, history, or plausibility. In a traditional narrow sense, fiction refers to written narratives in prose – often specifically novels, novellas, and short stories. More broadly, however, fiction encompasses imaginary narratives expressed in any medium, including not just writings but also live theatrical performances, films, television programs, radio dramas, comics, role-playing games, and video games.

== What type of thing is fiction? ==
- Product of imagination – Fiction forms pure imagination in the reader, partially because these novels are fabricated from creativity and are not pure truth; when the reader reads a passage from a novel they connect the words to images and visualize the event or situation being read in their imagination, hence the word.
- Source of entertainment – This type of entertainment is usually pursued to escape reality and imagine their own.
- Genre – any category of literature or other forms of art or culture; for example, music, and in general, any type of discourse, whether written or spoken, audial or visual, based on some set of stylistic criteria.
- Opposite of non-fiction – non-fiction is the form of any narrative, account, or other communicative work whose assertions and descriptions are understood to be fact.

== Elements of fiction ==
=== Character ===
- Fictional character – person in a narrative work of arts (such as a novel, play, television series or film).
  - Protagonist – main character around whom the events of the narrative's plot revolve.
  - Antagonist – character, group of characters, or an institution, who oppose the main character.

=== Plot ===
- Plot – events that make up a story, particularly: as they relate to one another in a pattern or in a sequence; as they relate to each other through cause and effect; how the reader views the story; or simply by coincidence.
  - Subplot – secondary strand of the plot that is a supporting side story for any story or the main plot. Subplots may connect to main plots, in either time and place or in thematic significance. Subplots often involve supporting characters, those besides the protagonist or antagonist.
  - Story arc – extended or continuing storyline in episodic storytelling media such as television, comic books, comic strips, boardgames, video games, and films with each episode following a narrative arc. On a television program, for example, the story would unfold over many episodes.
  - Narrative structure – structural framework that underlies the order and manner in which a narrative is presented to a reader, listener, or viewer. The narrative text structures are the plot and the setting.
  - Monomyth – the hero's journey; it is the common template of a broad category of tales that involve a hero going on an adventure, and in a decisive crisis wins a victory, and then comes home changed or transformed.

=== Setting ===
- Setting
- Milieu

=== Theme ===
- Theme
- Motif

=== Style ===
- Writing style
- Fiction writing
- Fiction-writing mode
- Continuity
- Allegory
- Symbolism
- Tone

== Types of fiction ==
=== Literary fiction ===
- Literary fiction – type of fiction that focuses more on analyzing the human condition than on plot

=== Genre fiction ===
Genre fiction – plot-driven fiction

- Crime fiction
- Fantasy
- Romance fiction
- Science fiction
- Western fiction
- Inspirational fiction
- Horror fiction

==== Genres based on age of reader ====
- Children's literature
- Young adult fiction
- New adult fiction

==== Genres based on subject matter ====
- Mystery fiction
  - Detective fiction
- Fantasy fiction – genre of fiction that uses magic and other supernatural phenomena as a primary element of plot, theme, or setting.
- Science fiction – genre of fiction dealing with the impact of imagined innovations in science or technology, often in a futuristic setting. Exploring the consequences of such innovations is the traditional purpose of science fiction, making it a "literature of ideas".
- Pornography
- Erotica – works of art, including literature, photography, film, sculpture and painting, that deal substantively with erotically stimulating or sexually arousing descriptions.

==== Genres based on form ====
- Novels
- Short stories
- Radio Theatre
  - Audio Drama
  - Podcasting
- Electronic literature
  - Cell phone novel
  - Digital poetry
    - Instapoetry
  - Hypertext fiction
  - Interactive fiction
  - Generative literature
- Fables
- Fairy tales
- Legend
- Plays
- Poems
- Films
- Comics
- TV Programs
- Video games

==== Genres based on the length of the work ====
- Flash fiction - A work of fewer than 2,000 words. (1,000 by some definitions) (around 5 pages)
- Short story - A work of at least 2,000 words but under 7,500 words (between about 10 and 40 pages).
- Novella - A work of at least 17,500 words but under 50,000 words (90-170 pages). The boundary between a long short story and a novella is vague.
- Novel - A work of 50,000 words or more (about 170+ pages).
- Epic - A long poem.

==== Other genres ====
- Fan fiction
  - Slash fiction
- Real person fiction

== Fictional elements ==
- Libraries and librarians in fiction
- Fictional animals
  - Fictional species
- Fictional locations
  - Fictional universes
  - Fictional planets
  - Fictional countries
  - Fictional cities
- Category:Lists of fictional story elements
- All pages beginning with "List of fiction(al)..."
- All pages beginning with "Lists of fiction(al)..."

== History of fiction ==
- History of literature
- History of film
- History of theatre

=== By content ===
- History of mystery fiction
  - History of detective fiction
- History of fantasy fiction
- History of science fiction

=== By form ===
- History of comics
- History of fables
- History of fairy tales
- History of film
- History of novels
- History of poetry
- History of serials
- History of short stories
- History of situation comedies
- History of video games

=== By length ===
- History of flash fiction
- History of short stories
- History of novellas
- History of novels

== Uses of fiction ==
- Advertising
- Instruction
- Propaganda
- Storytelling

== Narrative technique ==
Narrative technique – any of several specific methods the creator of a narrative uses to convey what they want — in other words, a strategy used in the making of a narrative to relay information to the audience and, particularly, to "develop" the narrative, usually in order to make it more complete, complicated, or interesting.

== Authors of fiction ==
=== Fantasy fiction authors ===
- Piers Anthony – Xanth
- Julian May – Saga of Pliocene Exile, Galactic Milieu Series
- J. R. R. Tolkien – The Hobbit, The Lord of the Rings
- C. S. Lewis – The Chronicles of Narnia
- Brand Sanderson – Cosmere

=== Horror fiction authors ===
- Stephen King
- H. P. Lovecraft – Cthulhu Mythos
- R. L. Stine – Fear Street, Goosebumps

=== Science fiction authors ===
- Isaac Asimov – Foundation series
- Arthur C. Clarke – 2001: A Space Odyssey film
- Philip K. Dick – Ubik, Do Androids Dream of Electric Sheep?
- Robert A. Heinlein – Stranger in a Strange Land, Starship Troopers
- Frank Herbert – Dune

=== Contemporary Fantasy Authors ===
- J. K. Rowling – Harry Potter
- Stephenie Meyer – Twilight
- Cassandra Clare – Shadowhunter Chronicles
- Jim Butcher – The Dresden Files
- Rick Riordan – Camp Half-Blood Chronicles, Kane Chronicles, Magnus Chase and the Gods of Asgard
- Richelle Mead – Vampire Academy, Georgina Kincaid
- Jill Murphy – Worst Witch
- P. L. Travers – Mary Poppins
- Katherine Applegate – Animorphs
- Melinda Metz – Roswell
- L. J. Smith – The Vampire Diaries

=== Superhero authors ===
- Jean Giraud – Blueberry, Arzach
- Stan Lee – Marvel Comics
- Will Eisner – Spirit, A Contract with God
- Alan Moore – Watchmen, V for Vendetta
- Michael Grant – Gone
