= Bloodlines (Mead novel) =

2011 novel by Richelle Mead

- Cover of Bloodlines
- Author: Richelle Mead
- Cover artist: Emilian Gregory; Michael Frost
- Language: English
- Series: Bloodlines
- Genre: Young adult Urban fantasy Dark fantasy
- Publisher: Razorbill
- Publication date: August 23, 2011
- Publication place: United States
- Media type: Print (Hardcover); Audio CD
- Pages: 421
- ISBN: 978-1-59514-317-4
- OCLC: 731728988
- Preceded by: Last Sacrifice
- Followed by: The Golden Lily

Bloodlines is the first book in the spin-off series of the Vampire Academy series by American author Richelle Mead. It follows the story of narrator Sydney Sage, the alchemist who helped Rose in Blood Promise, Spirit Bound and Last Sacrifice.

The book was released on August 23, 2011.

== Plot ==
After helping rogue Dhampir Rose Hathaway evade justice, Sydney Sage's situation with the Alchemists is shaky at best. Her career is jeopardized to the point where she may have to undergo re-education. Woken in the middle of the night, Sydney is given a last chance: to pose as the older sister of Jill Dragomir ( illegitimate sister of Vasilisa Dragomir ) at a boarding school in Palm Springs California and assists Keith the alchemist whom she hates and also studied with Sydney's father to conceal her identity to those who oppose Vasilisa. This is because of the family quorum law which means that if Jill were to die Vasilisa would have no family left and would have to abdicate the throne. This is all set in motion due to an attack on Jill which was violent and brutal. Sydney, Jill, Eddie Castile, and Adrian head off to Palm Springs. Sydney and Jill room together while Eddie rooms with Micah which is later said to remind Eddie of his dead best friend Mason from St. Vladimir's Academy.

On the first day of school, Jill is sent back to her dorm room accused of having a hangover in the morning. While Sydney visits Adrian in the afternoon, he reveals that he and Jill are bonded from the attack which actually killed Jill, but Adrian, being a spirit user, brought her back from the dead - she is now shadow kissed. This is why she always knows what Adrian is thinking and why she feels hungover every morning. As time goes on, Sydney is excelling in school while Jill is seen to have few friends and is continuously picked on by Laurel due to her crush on Micah, as he shows an interest in Jill.

When meeting with an older Moroi - Clarence, who is housing Adrian, Jill starts to fall for the Moroi's 19-year-old son Lee. Lee takes the whole squad mini-golfing and Jill uses her water magic much to Sydney's disdain, as it freaks her out reminding her of her alchemist training that Moroi are unnatural creatures made from evil.

While at school, Sydney starts to get friendly with a boy who helps out in her history class. Trey asks Sydney about the lily tattoo on her cheek, which is the sign of an alchemist. Many in the school have similar tattoos that give them drug-like effects similar to steroids or marijuana. Sydney tells Keith about the alchemist-like tattoos, but Keith brushes it off. After talking to her friends, Sydney discovers that the tattoos are given by a place called Nevermore and she finds vials of Moroi blood and saliva along with copper and silver. When visiting Adrian, Sydney sees a needle sized hole in Clarence's neck and deduces that Keith has been supplying Nevermore. Thus, she has him removed by the Alchemists.

Jill is in a fashion show at a local boutique and after the show Adrian and Sydney get into an argument because Sydney has been paying for Adrian to go to college classes without him knowing. Sydney was worried he would drop out before next semester, but seeing as damaging it is to Jill she decides to go to Keith's house and let Lee drop Jill back at school.

While clearing out Keith's things, Lee turns up and Sydney discovers that Lee was a strigoi, but he was turned back by a spirit user. This means that he ages slower and may be unable to access his magic. Lee also wishes to be turned back into a strigoi, but is unable to and he's the reason for all of the unknown deaths in Palm Springs including that of his cousin. Adrian show up at Keith's house, but both he and Sydney are restrained and Lee called his strigoi friends using Sydney and Adrian as a bargain for being re-awakened. Once the strigoi turn up and try to change Lee into one of them he instead dies then Sydney, Adrian, and the two strigoi get into a fight. One strigoi goes to drink Sydney's blood, but cannot as it is too vile and tastes horrible, but as they feed on Adrian. Sydney uses a fire charm that she created on a whim of her history teacher Mrs.Terwilliger to distract the strigoi. Just then, Eddie and Jill show up and with the help of Jill's water magic Eddie kills both strigoi.

After the encounter, the alchemist offer Sydney Keith's apartment, but knowing Adrian's wishes, she instead asks that Adrian be given the apartment in exchange for his assistance in the research into spirit users and Strigoi and why they cannot be reawakened. Sydney instead requests her own dorm room on campus, allowing her to continue to watch Jill. Back at school, Sydney confronts her teacher about the amulet, and the teacher confesses she had known about vampires all along as well as Alchemists. She believes that Sydney has an innate magical ability, and it was that ability that gave the amulet its power.

Abe Mazur, Rose's father, arrives with Jill's new roommate – a Dhampir named Angeline who Sydney met while on the run with Rose the previous year. Adrian realizes that Abe has been keeping a close eye on Palm Springs because of Nevermore – and that Abe himself is likely trafficking vampire blood as well. Abe, in turn, reveals to Adrian that the reason Sydney had been forced to obey his commands was that Sydney had contracted him for an attack on Keith that left him with a glass eye – retribution for Keith's rape of her sister.

== Characters ==
- Sydney Sage – an Alchemist and the main protagonist of the Bloodlines series
- Adrian Ivashkov – a royal Moroi Spirit user who was once Rose Hathaway's boyfriend
- Jill Mastrano – Vasilisa Dragomir's half-sister and a water user, bonded to Adrian
- Eddie Castile – Jill's Guardian
- Lee Donahue – Clarence Donahue's son
- Keith Darnell – the Palm Springs Alchemist, in charge of supervising Sydney
- Micah Vallence – Jill's classmate at Amberwood
- Abe Mazur – Rose Hathaway's father
- Laurel – Jill's rival
- Clarence Donahue – a Moroi in Palm Springs

== Reception ==
Critical reception for Bloodlines has been positive, with UT San Diego writing that it "stands out from the crowded vampire genre because it's not centered on a human-vampire romance".

== See also ==
- Vampire Academy, the series preceding Bloodlines
