= Vampire Academy =

Series of young adult paranormal romance novels by Richelle Mead

- Vampire Academy; Frostbite; Shadow Kiss; Blood Promise; Spirit Bound; Last Sacrifice
- Author: Richelle Mead
- Cover artist: Emilian Gregory
- Country: United States
- Language: English
- Genre: Young adult Paranormal romance Urban fantasy
- Publisher: Razorbill
- Published: 2007–2010
- Media type: Print (hard, soft) ebook (Kindle, Nook)
- No. of books: 6
- Followed by: Bloodlines series

Vampire Academy is a series of six young adult paranormal romance novels by American author Richelle Mead. It tells the story of Rosemarie "Rose" Hathaway, a dhampir girl, who is training to be a guardian of her moroi best friend, Vasilisa "Lissa" Dragomir. In the process of learning how to defeat strigoi in St. Vladimir's Academy, Rose finds herself caught in a forbidden romance with her instructor, Dimitri Belikov, while having an unbreakable psychic bond with Lissa.

The first book in the series, Vampire Academy, was published in 2007; it was followed by Frostbite in 2008. The third book in the series, Shadow Kiss was also published in 2008, and the fourth book, Blood Promise, was published in 2009. The fifth book, Spirit Bound, and the sixth book, Last Sacrifice, were released in 2010. As of 2013, the series had sold 8 million copies in 35 countries.

The first book in the series was adapted into a film directed by Mark Waters, starring Zoey Deutch, Lucy Fry, Danila Kozlovsky and Dominic Sherwood, released by The Weinstein Company on February 7, 2014. The film was a financial and critical failure. A reboot television series, co-developed by Julie Plec, debuted on September 15, 2022 on Peacock. It was canceled after one season.

== Overview ==
- Vampire Academy follows Dhampir Rosemarie "Rose" Hathaway and her best friend, Moroi princess Vasilissa "Lissa" Dragomir, who after two years on the run, have been brought back to their school, St. Vladimir's Academy. Rose and Lissa become caught in and must entangle themselves from forbidden romances and the Strigoi, evil and dangerous vampires who are set on turning Lissa into one of their own.
- Frostbite follows Rose and Lissa as they navigate through their tangled love lives, a Strigoi attack which has St. Vladimir on high alert, and a school ski trip crashed by deadly Strigoi.
- Shadow Kiss follows Rose and Lissa as graduation looms near. Rose begins to have worrying visions, and has fallen in love with her instructor and mentor, Dimitri Belikov. The Strigoi attack St. Vladimir's, and Rose is forced to decide between protecting Lissa, or losing Dimitri.
- Blood Promise follows Rose as she deals with the aftermath of the recent Strigoi attack on St. Vladimir's. She must decide between honouring her life's vow and protecting Lissa, or leaving the Academy to hunt down Dimitri, who is now a Strigoi.
- Spirit Bound follows Rose as she returns to St. Vladimir's. While life after graduation awaits both Rose and Lissa, Rose cannot forget about failing to kill Dimitri. Roses fears come true, and Dimitri comes hunting after her, now a Strigoi and wishing for her to join him too.
- Last Sacrifice follows Rose who is in prison awaiting a wrongful execution, and Lissa who is grappling for the Moroi throne. Both must go to incredible lengths to find freedom, leaning on enemies and friends alike.

== Main characters ==
- Rosemarie "Rose" Hathaway, the narrator. A dhampir teenager training to be a guardian at St. Vladimir's Academy, Rose has a spirit bond with Lissa as a result of being brought back to life by Lissa's magic. Rose falls in love with her older mentor Dimitri.
- Vasilisa "Lissa" Dragomir, a Moroi, the last of the royal Dragomirs, and Rose's best friend. A user of a rare form of magic (spirit), she can bring the dead back to life, heal, and use compulsion. She maintains a bond with Rose throughout the majority of the series.
- Dimitri Belikov, a twenty-four-year-old Russian dhampir and guardian. He is Rose's primary love interest.
- Christian Ozera, a Moroi and Lissa's primary love interest. His parents willingly turned Strigoi, causing people to treat him with distrust.
- Adrian Ivashkov, a Moroi spirit user who dated Rose.
- Mia Rinaldi, a Moroi water user. Rose and Lissa's enemy (and later, friend) at St. Vladimir's Academy.
- Abe Mazur, Rose's father and an influential Moroi whom Rose didn't know earlier. He has weird networks and gangster dealings to solve problems for his daughter. Rose comes to know him only in the fourth book.
- Sydney Sage, a strict but friendly alchemist who helps Rose find Dimitri and later Rose and Dimitri in their escape and we later see her getting detained for her deeds.

== Publication history ==
There are six books in the original series, which is followed by a spin-off series called Bloodlines (see below). As of 2013, the series had sold over 8 million copies worldwide.

1. Vampire Academy (August 16, 2007), ISBN 978-1-59514-174-3
2. Frostbite (April 10, 2008), ISBN 978-1-59514-175-0
3. Shadow Kiss (November 13, 2008), ISBN 978-1-59514-197-2
4. Blood Promise (August 25, 2009), ISBN 978-1-59514-198-9
5. Spirit Bound (May 18, 2010), ISBN 978-1-59514-250-4
6. Last Sacrifice (December 7, 2010), ISBN 978-1-59514-306-8

The series made its first appearance on the New York Times Best Seller list at #4 with the release of Shadow Kiss. It has since made the list with each new book release, including an appearance at #1 when Spirit Bound was released.

== Spin-off ==
A spin-off series called Bloodlines follows several characters from the Vampire Academy series and is centered around an Alchemist, Sydney Sage. The series includes six books.

The first book in the series Bloodlines, was released August 23, 2011. It eventually reached the number two spot on The New York Times Best Seller list in March 2013. It was followed by The Golden Lily on June 12, 2012, which debuted at number one on The New York Times Best Seller list. The third book, The Indigo Spell, was released February 12, 2013. The fourth book, The Fiery Heart, was released on November 19, 2013. The fifth book, Silver Shadows, was released on July 29, 2014. The sixth book, The Ruby Circle, was released on February 10, 2015.

== Adaptations ==
=== Film ===
In June 2010, Preger Entertainment optioned the film rights to the Vampire Academy series. On July 6, they announced that producer Don Murphy joined them to help bring the series to the big screen.

On December 17, 2012, Daniel Waters was hired to write a script based on the first novel. On February 1, 2013, it was announced that Zoey Deutch, Lucy Fry, and Danila Kozlovsky were cast as Rose Hathaway, Lissa Dragomir, and Dimitri Belikov respectively. Principal photography commenced on May 28, 2013, in London, at Pinewood Studios in Buckinghamshire, England and officially ended on July 20, 2013.

It was released in North America on February 7, 2014, and globally between March and July of the same year. It was distributed in the United States by The Weinstein Company. The film was a financial failure, grossing only $15.4 million worldwide against a $30 million budget, making the film a box office flop. Critically it was almost universally panned upon release.

Despite the movie financial failure, Preger Entertainment announced on August 4, 2014 that they had found investors for a sequel based on the second novel. However, to convince them that there's enough demand, they launched a fundraising campaign on Indiegogo to help fund the rest of the production cost. The campaign was launched on August 6, 2014 and Piers Ashworth was hired to write a script. The campaign failed to reach its goal, resulting in the project cancellation.

=== Television ===
In May 2021, Peacock announced a straight-to-series order for a series based on the books, developed by Julie Plec. It was canceled after one season.

=== Graphic novel ===
A graphic novel based on the first Vampire Academy book was published on August 23, 2011. The graphic novel is adapted by Leigh Dragoon and illustrated by Emma Vieceli. A graphic novel for the second book in the series, Frostbite, was also released in May 2012.
