= Dominic Sherwood =

English actor

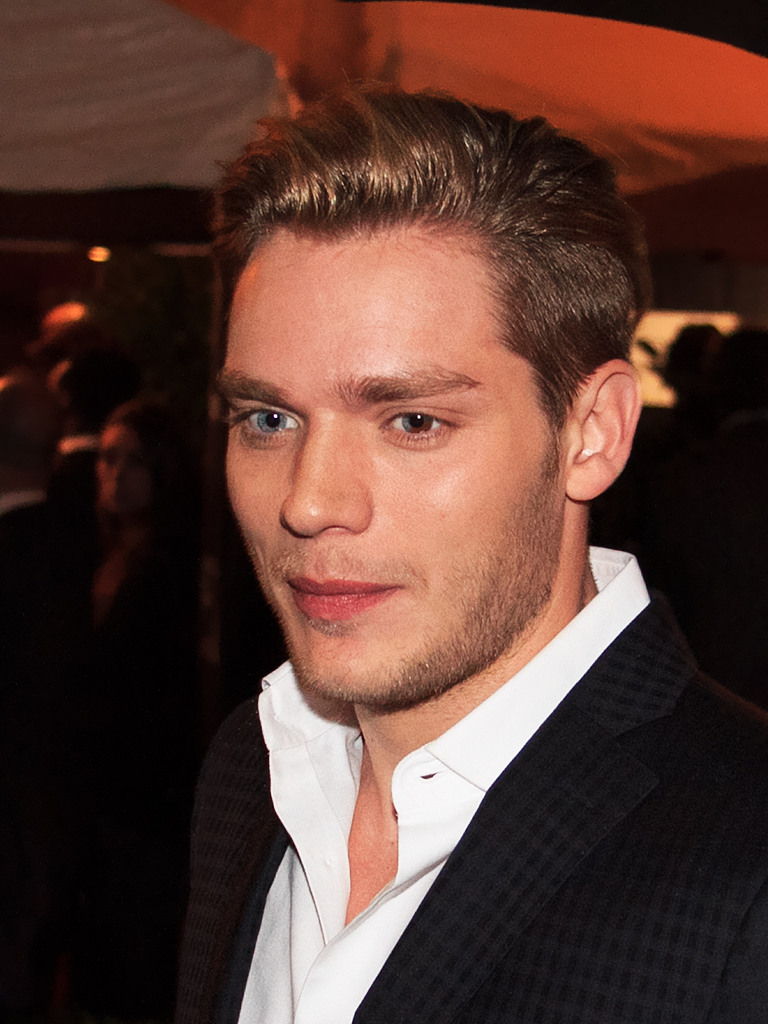
- Sherwood at the 2015 Toronto International Film Festival
- Born: Dominic Anthony Sherwood; 6 February 1990 (age 36); Tunbridge Wells, Kent, England
- Occupations: Actor, model
- Years active: 2010–present

Dominic Anthony Sherwood (born 6 February 1990) is an English actor and model, best known for his roles as Christian Ozera in the teen vampire film Vampire Academy (2014), Jace Wayland on the Freeform fantasy series Shadowhunters (2016–2019), Kurt in the series Penny Dreadful: City of Angels (2020) and Jeff Murphy in the Netflix legal drama Partner Track (2022).

== Early life ==
Sherwood was born in Tunbridge Wells, Kent. He attended Oakwood Park Grammar School in Maidstone for his secondary school education. After studying drama and theatre in Maidstone and Sevenoaks, he left to work abroad, starting in Kenya and working for six months before moving to London.

== Career ==
Sherwood's first acting role came in 2010, with his appearance as Jack Simmons in the third season of The Cut. The following year, he guest starred as a waiter named Tom in the Sadie J episode "Cherylistic". In 2012, he had a small role in the drama film Not Fade Away as a young Mick Jagger. He landed his first notable role in 2014, as Christian Ozera in the satirical horror film Vampire Academy, based on the novel by Richelle Mead.

In February 2015, he became known for his appearance in Taylor Swift's music video for her single "Style", which was directed by Kyle Newman. On 20 April 2015, it was announced he was chosen to play Jace Herondale in the Freeform fantasy drama series Shadowhunters, an adaptation of Cassandra Clare's The Mortal Instruments book series. He also co-starred alongside Ed Westwick and Jeremy Sumpter in the thriller film Billionaire Ransom, and appeared in the horror-thriller film Don't Sleep with Drea de Matteo and Cary Elwes.

In 2020, Sherwood starred in the dark fantasy TV series Penny Dreadful: City of Angels, which was cancelled after one season.

On 13 September 2021, it was reported that Sherwood will be starring in a reboot of Arnold Schwarzenegger's 1996 film Eraser, titled Eraser: Reborn, which was released on 31 March 2022.

Sherwood also starred in the Netflix series Partner Track based on Helen Wan's novel of the same name. Principle production for the series began in September 2021 and ended in late February 2022 in New York.

On 11 April 2022, he began hosting a Shadowhunters rewatch podcast with co-star Katherine McNamara called Return to the Shadows.

== Personal life ==
Sherwood dated his Vampire Academy co-star Sarah Hyland from 2015 to 2017. From 2023 to 2024, Sherwood was in a relationship with American actress Decker Sadowski. As of 2025, Sherwood is dating actress Francesca Corney.

Sherwood has sectoral heterochromia; one of his eyes is blue while the other is half blue-half brown.

== Filmography ==
=== Film ===
| Year | Title | Role | Notes |
|---|---|---|---|
| 2012 | Not Fade Away | Mick Jagger | Supporting role |
| 2014 | Vampire Academy | Christian Ozera | Main role |
| 2016 | Billionaire Ransom | James Herrick | Main role |
| 2017 | Don't Sleep | Zach Bradford | Main role |
| 2022 | Eraser: Reborn | Mason Pollard | Main role |
| TBA | White Tide | Jack | Filming |

=== TV ===
| Year | Title | Role | Notes |
|---|---|---|---|
| 2010 | The Cut | Jack Simmons | Recurring role; 11 episodes |
| 2011 | Sadie J | Tom | Episode: "Cherylistic" |
| 2013 | Mayday | Louis | Episode: "1.1" |
| 2016–2019 | Shadowhunters | Jace Herondale | Main role Nominated – Teen Choice Award for Choice Sci-Fi/Fantasy TV Actor (2018); Nominated – Teen Choice Award for Choice Sci-Fi/Fantasy TV Actor (2019) |
| 2016 | Modern Family | James | Episode: "Crazy Train" |
| 2020 | Penny Dreadful: City of Angels | Kurt | Recurring role |
| 2022 | Partner Track | Jeff Murphy | Main role |
| 2024 | Haunted Wedding | Brian Fuller / Malcolm Buchanan | Dual role |
| 2025 | A Suite Holiday Romance | Ian | Main role |

Music video roles
| Year | Title | Artist |
|---|---|---|
| 2013 | "I Want You to Know" | Tchengiz |
| 2015 | "Style" | Taylor Swift |
| 2017 | "Au Revoir" | Katie Welch |
