= Silver Shadow =

Silver Shadow may refer to:

- "Silver Shadow" (song), a 1985 song by Atlantic Starr
- Silver Shadow Stakes, a horse race
- Rolls-Royce Silver Shadow, a car
- Silver Shadow (ship), operated by Silversea Cruises
- Legacy of the Silver Shadow, a 2002 Australian children's television series
- Silver Shadows, a 2014 Bloodlines series novel by Richelle Mead
