= Eraser (film) =

1996 American film by Chuck Russell

- Theatrical release poster
- Directed by: Chuck Russell
- Screenplay by: Tony Puryear; Walon Green
- Story by: Tony Puryear; Walon Green; Michael S. Chernuchin
- Produced by: Arnold Kopelson; Anne Kopelson
- Starring: Arnold Schwarzenegger; Vanessa Williams; James Caan; James Coburn; Robert Pastorelli
- Cinematography: Adam Greenberg
- Edited by: Michael Tronick
- Music by: Alan Silvestri
- Production company: Kopelson Entertainment
- Distributed by: Warner Bros.
- Release dates: June 21, 1996 (United States); August 23, 1996 (United Kingdom)
- Running time: 114 minutes
- Country: United States
- Language: English
- Budget: $100 million
- Box office: $242 million

Eraser is a 1996 American action film directed by Chuck Russell and starring Arnold Schwarzenegger, Vanessa Williams, James Caan, James Coburn and Robert Pastorelli.

The film tells the story of a U.S. Marshal of WITSEC who protects a senior operative testifying about an illegal arms deal and is forced to fight his former allies when one of the players is revealed to be a mole inside WITSEC.

Eraser premiered in United States on June 21, 1996, and was released in the rest of the United Kingdom on August 23, 1996, by Warner Bros. It received mixed reviews from critics, although they praised Williams's and Schwarzenegger's performances, the action sequences and the visual effects, and grossed $242 million against a $100 million budget. The film was nominated for an Academy Award for Best Sound Effects Editing in 1997, but lost to The Ghost and the Darkness. It was also one of the first major films released on DVD, being part of the Japanese launch lineup of Warner Home Video's debut of the format on December 20, 1996.

A direct-to-video reboot of the film, titled Eraser: Reborn and starring Dominic Sherwood, was released on June 7, 2022.

== Plot ==
John Kruger, a U.S. Marshal who specializes in "erasing" witnesses, is given a new assignment by his superior, Arthur Beller: Lee Cullen has alerted the FBI that Cyrez executives have financed the creation of an electromagnetic rifle, which they intend to sell on the black market.

Lee downloads data from the weapon's development onto two discs. Cyrez Vice President William Donahue detects Lee's intrusion and summons her for a meeting. After discovering her alliance with the FBI, Donahue commits suicide. Lee delivers the disc but refuses Kruger's offer to go into protection. The FBI's disc is replaced with a fake on the orders of Under Secretary of Defense Daniel Harper.

Lee is attacked by mercenaries sent by Cyrez CEO Eugene Morehart but is rescued by Kruger, who learns that several other witnesses are being murdered due to someone in WITSEC leaking information. The agency is now transferring all witnesses to other locations. Kruger helps his mentor Robert DeGuerin raid a cabin and rescue the latter's witness from a team of assassins. DeGuerin murders the witness when she overhears one of her captors reveal that he is the mole.

DeGuerin drugs Kruger, who manages to warn Lee before losing consciousness. The call is traced to New York City and DeGuerin kills his innocent deputy Monroe with Kruger's gun. When Kruger awakens, DeGuerin tries to blackmail him into giving up Lee and even offers to cut him in on the highly lucrative deal he is apparently planning. Kruger fends them off and escapes from the plane to rescue Lee from the same mercenaries who tried to kill her before. Kruger and Lee flee through New York City Zoo.

DeGuerin has Kruger and Lee branded as fugitives. The pair infiltrate Cyrez with the aid of Johnny Casteleone, a witness Kruger recently erased, and use Donahue's terminal to decrypt Lee's second disc. The disc reveals that a shipment of rifles has been stashed at the docks in Baltimore. The buyer is Russian mafia boss Sergei Ivanovich Petrofsky, who plans to resell the weapons to terrorists. The company detects the intrusion and erases the disc; DeGuerin and his men capture Lee, but Kruger escapes.

Casteleone contacts his cousin Tony "Two-Toes", who controls the docks. They kill Petrofsky and everyone else. DeGuerin tries to shoot Lee, but Kruger comes to her aid and destroys the system on the crane. He then secures DeGuerin, proving his and Lee's innocence. DeGuerin, Harper and Morehart are indicted for treason, but when it becomes clear that they will likely be acquitted in court, Kruger fakes his and Lee's deaths in an explosion.

DeGuerin, Harper and Morehart leave in a limo that suddenly stops at a railroad crossing. The driver, revealed to be Casteleone, locks the doors and exits the vehicle. Kruger calls DeGuerin with his iconic words, "You've just been erased!" at which point a freight train plows into the limo, killing all three men in it. Kruger returns to Lee, who asks what happened, to which he responds, "They caught a train", and they drive off to start a new life.

== Cast ==
- Arnold Schwarzenegger as U.S. Marshal John "Eraser" Kruger
- Vanessa Williams as Lee Cullen
- James Caan as U.S. Marshal Robert DeGuerin
- James Coburn as U.S. Marshal WITSEC Chief Arthur Beller
- Robert Pastorelli as Johnny Casteleone
- James Cromwell as William Donahue, Vice President of International Division at Cyrez and Cullen's supervisor
- Danny Nucci as WITSEC U.S. Deputy Marshal Monroe
- Andy Romano as Under Secretary of Defense Daniel Harper
- Joe Viterelli as Tony "Two-Toes"
- Olek Krupa as Sergei Ivanovich Petrofsky
- Gerry Becker as Eugene Morehart
- Nick Chinlund as Calderon
- Michael Papajohn as Schiff
- K. Todd Freeman as FBI Agent Dutton
- Mark Rolston as "J. Scar", the mercenary leader
- John Slattery as FBI Agent Corman
- Robert Miranda as FBI Agent Frediano
- Roma Maffia as Claire Isaacs
- Tony Longo as Mike "Little Mike"
- John Snyder as Sal
- Rocco Sisto as Pauley
- Rick Batalla as Kevin, The Bartender
- Ismael "East" Carlo as Father Rodriguez
- Skipp Sudduth as Watch Commander
- Sven-Ole Thorsen as Petrofsky's Goon
- Denis Forest as Cyrez's System Administrator
- Patrick Kilpatrick as James Haggerty, Head of Cyrez Security
- Camryn Manheim as Nurse
- Steven Ford as Knoland
- Cylk Cozart as Darryl
- Brian Libby as 1st Perimeter Guy

== Production ==
=== Development and casting ===
Director Chuck Russell and star Arnold Schwarzenegger were originally working on another project together when Eraser was brought to their attention. Russell was excited about the possibilities the film could bring between actor and the character: "I see Arnold the way a lot of people do—as a mythic, bigger-than-life character—and that's who Kruger is. The character and the scenario are based firmly in reality, but I liked the mythic proportions of this man with a strong sense of duty, a strong sense of honor, who will literally do anything to protect a noble witness. I was excited about doing a film that had heroic proportions." Producer Arnold Kopelson was also keen to cast Schwarzenegger in the role of "The Eraser", having talked with the actor about working on projects before. Vanessa Williams would be cast as the lead female character, Lee Cullen, the key witness Eraser must protect. Williams came to the attention of the Kopelsons when Maria Shriver, wife of Arnold Schwarzenegger at the time, suggested her for the role. To play the character of DeGuerin (Kruger's mentor and the main sociopathic antagonist), the filmmakers wanted an actor who could "convey intelligence, skill and magnetism—a more mature version of the Kruger character", and they cast James Caan in this role. Before Caan was officially cast, Jonathan Pryce was also considered for the role.

=== Screenplay ===
The screenplay was initially the work of Tony Puryear, who had a background in advertising and rap videos. Writers Walon Green and Michael S. Chernuchin had previously worked together on the television drama Law & Order. Extensive, uncredited rewrites were made by Russell's regular collaborator Frank Darabont, Terminator 2 screenwriter William Wisher Jr., and Christine Roum.

Additional rewrites were made by John Milius as a favor to Schwarzenegger. John Pogue also did rewrites on the script; however, most of his ideas were not used. He later directed the film's standalone sequel, Eraser: Reborn.

=== Design ===
The "rail-gun" featured in the film as a key plot device, and Schwarzenegger talks on the subject: "We paid a lot of attention to making the audience feel the danger of this weapon, that anyone can be outside of your house, looking right through the walls. It really leaves you nowhere to hide," he explains. "But, on top of that, we show the sophistication of the weapon in a lot of fun ways: you not only see through a building, you see a person's skeleton and even their heart beating inside. There are some great visual effects there."

=== Filming ===
Eraser began principal photography on September 13, 1995, in New York City. Locations would include The Harlem Rail Yard in the South Bronx, Central Park's Sheep Meadow and Chinatown. Following shooting in New York production moved to Washington, D.C. For the action sequence which takes place in the Reptile House of New York City Zoo, interiors were built on the soundstages of the Warner Bros. Studios in Burbank, California. The screenplay went through numerous drafts by some of the most prominent screenwriters in the business, with a great deal of uncredited script-doctoring work being done by and William Wisher.

One of the most demanding action sequences in the film featured the character of Kruger forced to flee from a jet speeding through the skies at 250 miles per hour (400 km/h). Speaking about this scene, director Russell says: "These things are jigsaw puzzle pieces not only within shooting sequence but within each shot. You had elements that were live action, elements that were miniature, sometimes computer-generated, and they're all married together in the final processing." Some of the physical stunts were performed by Schwarzenegger himself. For the "aerial" stunt he was required to fall 65 feet (20 m) in vertical descent and perform a back flip in mid-flight. The shot took seven takes to get right. In the final film, Kruger appears to drop along the length of the fuselage and past the flaming engine of the jet thanks to inventive camera angles and special effects.

=== Post-production ===
The original name of the Cyrez corporations was "Cyrex". However, Cyrix, a microprocessor corporation and rival of Intel, protested. The name was then changed digitally in any scenes where the name appeared in a fairly costly process for the time, and dialogue redubbed. Some instances of the "Cyrex" logo are still visible in the finished film.

== Music ==
Vanessa Williams sang the theme song, "Where Do We Go from Here".

== Release ==
=== Home media ===
Eraser was released on VHS and LaserDisc on October 29, 1996. The DVD was then released in 1997.

The North American LaserDisc release of the film is notorious for being poorly manufactured, with a large number of copies exhibiting severe laser rot.

It was released on Blu-ray in 2008 and on 4K Blu-ray in 2026.

== Reception ==
=== Box office ===
Eraser had an opening weekend of $24.5 million in the United States during the summer season of 1996, staying ahead of The Hunchback of Notre Dame. The final U.S. gross was $101 million and final worldwide gross was $242 million. Eraser was a commercial success in the Philippines, grossing more at the local box office than Twister, Mission: Impossible and The Rock. The film also had the largest opening for a Warner Bros. Pictures film in Malaysia, holding that record for six years until 2002 when it was given to Harry Potter and the Chamber of Secrets.

=== Critical response ===
Based on 59 reviews collected by Rotten Tomatoes, the film has an overall approval rating of 46% and an average score of 5.4/10. The site's consensus reads: "Eraser's shoot-'em-up action might show off some cutting edge weaponry, but its rote story is embarrassingly obsolete". On Metacritic, the film has a score of 56 out of 100 based on reviews from 18 critics, indicating "mixed or average" reviews.

Audiences polled by CinemaScore gave the film an average grade of "A−" on an A+ to F scale.

A more positive review came from Roger Ebert, who gave the film 3 stars out of a possible 4. He wrote that there were so many plot holes that "it helps to have a short attention span", but that Eraser is nonetheless "actually good action fun, with spectacular stunts and special effects" and a spirited performance from Williams "running and jumping and fighting and shooting and kicking and screaming and being tied to chairs and smuggling computer discs and looking great."

== Other media ==
=== Novelization ===
A novelization of the film by Robert Tine was released in 1996.

=== Video game ===
The PC video game Eraser: Turnabout was released as a follow-up to the plot of the film.

== Reboot ==
In September 2021, a sequel, which became a reboot of Eraser instead, was announced to be in development with Dominic Sherwood in the lead role. The film co-stars Jacky Lai, and the supporting cast includes McKinley Belcher III and Eddie Ramos. It was filmed secretly in mid-2021, for release through Warner Bros. Home Entertainment. The film was released theatrically in Germany on March 31, 2022, and on Digital, Blu-ray and DVD in United States on June 7, 2022. It became available for streaming on HBO Max in fall 2022.

== See also ==
- List of American films of 1996
- Arnold Schwarzenegger filmography
