= Vampire Academy (film) =

2014 fantasy comedy horror film by Mark Waters

- Theatrical release poster
- Directed by: Mark Waters
- Screenplay by: Daniel Waters
- Based on: Vampire Academy by Richelle Mead
- Produced by: Don Murphy; Susan Montford; Michael Preger; Deepak Nayar
- Starring: Zoey Deutch; Lucy Fry; Danila Kozlovsky; Dominic Sherwood; Cameron Monaghan; Sami Gayle; Sarah Hyland; Joely Richardson; Olga Kurylenko; Gabriel Byrne
- Cinematography: Tony Pierce-Roberts
- Edited by: Chris Gill
- Music by: Rolfe Kent
- Production companies: Kintop Pictures; Reliance Entertainment; Angry Films; Preger Entertainment
- Distributed by: The Weinstein Company
- Release date: February 7, 2014 (United States)
- Running time: 104 minutes
- Country: United States
- Language: English
- Budget: $30 million
- Box office: $15.4 million

Vampire Academy is a 2014 American fantasy comedy film directed by Mark Waters from a screenplay by his brother Daniel Waters, based on the first book of the novel series of the same name by Richelle Mead. The film stars an ensemble cast led by Zoey Deutch as Rose Hathaway, a Dhampir, and Lucy Fry as Lissa Dragomir, her Moroi best friend, and follows their return to the St Vladimir's Academy boarding school, after being on the run for one year.

Preger Entertainment announced the film's development in 2010, with Don Murphy as producer. In 2012, the Waters brothers joined the project with Mark serving as director and Daniel as screenwriter. Casting began in February 2013 with Deutch, Fry, and Danila Kozlovsky announced to play their respective roles. Principal photography took place at Pinewood Studios in England between May and July 2013.

The Weinstein Company released Vampire Academy theatrically in the United States on February 7, 2014. The film received generally negative reviews from critics and grossed $15.4 million worldwide against a $30 million budget, making it a box-office bomb. Due to the film's poor box-office performance, its theatrical release in the United Kingdom was postponed and the film was later released as a direct-to-video on July 14, 2014 by Entertainment One.

Following the film's failure, Preger Entertainment launched an Indiegogo campaign to help fund the production for a sequel based on the second novel, Frostbite, with Piers Ashworth hired to write a script. However, the campaign failed to reach its goal. A reboot television series premiered in 2022 on Peacock and ran for one season.

== Plot ==
Rose Hathaway, a seventeen-year-old Dhampir guardian-in-training, and her best friend, Moroi Princess Vasilisa "Lissa" Dragomir, are living discreetly, having escaped from the St. Vladimir's Academy boarding school one year prior. Dhampirs are vampire-human hybrids trained to protect the Moroi, mortal vampires with a normal lifespan and death who tend to have magical powers and belong to royal bloodlines.

The girls are found and forced to return to St. Vladimir's Academy where they encounter the Strigoi, the undead vampires of legend, which Moroi become if they completely drain their victims of blood, or are turned. Lissa is ostracised by her peers as Rose starts to form an attraction to her Russian Dhampir mentor and fellow Guardian, Dimitri Belikov.

Mysterious messages threatening Lissa start to appear, written in blood on her wall and an exploding memorial to her family in the school church. They suspect that it is the work of classmate Mia Rinaldi, who had dated Lissa's now-deceased, non-monogamous brother Andre and now directs her hatred towards Lissa as the only surviving member of the Dragomir line.

Manipulating two other students using sex, she persuades them to help her spread rumors about Rose. Moroi Christian Ozera, viewed poorly by his peers as both his parents became Strigoi, tries to romance Lissa but Rose blocks him by lying to them both. Christian and Lissa begin to bond regardless.

Later, Rose investigates the disappearance of Sonya Karp, a teacher who helped her and Lissa escape, and finds video footage of Karp mentally unstable from using Spirit Magic. She also discovers that Lissa has the same rare power that the founder of their school St. Vladimir had, that of Spirit, a power which enables the caster to heal ailments, and saves the dying; however, using Spirit also drains the user's life energy gradually with each use.

Rose demands headmistress Ellen Kirova show her classified information on Karp, who reveals that Karp became Strigoi and escaped before disappearing. At the same time, dead animals begin to appear wherever Lissa goes. At the Equinox Dance, Rose discovers Mia is not responsible for all the dead animals. Soon, Lissa is kidnapped and Rose, Dimitri, and Christian rush to save her.

The Moroi responsible for the kidnapping and the threats against Lissa is Victor Dashkov, a previous candidate for the throne, who suffers from the chronic disease Sandovsky's Syndrome. He plans to use Lissa to cure himself, although the cure would eventually cost Lissa's life. Once captured and placed in the secure cells beneath the school, Victor explains to Rose that the reason she bonded to Lissa is because she was "shadow-kissed", having been brought back to life by Lissa's magic.

While they are talking, Victor's daughter Natalie, who befriended both Lissa and Rose and was a very insecure student there, is enacting the tools of his escape. She'd turned Strigoi by draining her crush to death. Dimitri comes and kills Natalie and detains Victor.

During Vampire Queen Tatiana Ivashkov's speech, Lissa steps in and gives a speech of her own. She announces that Spirit is her type of magic, and that it is thanks to Rose that she can master it. Rose then meets Dimitri outside and asks about his feelings for her. He states that he can't love her because if there was any danger between Rose and Lissa, he would save her instead of Lissa. She gives Dimitri a kiss on the cheek and walks back to the academy.

In a mountain cave close to the academy, Karp looks down upon the campus with a horde of Strigoi behind her.

== Cast ==
- Zoey Deutch as Rosemarie "Rose" Hathaway, a seventeen-year-old Dhampir, Lissa's best friend, and a novice Guardian
  - Macey Chipping as young Rose
- Lucy Fry as Vasilisa "Lissa" Dragomir, an eighteen-year-old Moroi princess
- Danila Kozlovsky as Dimitri Belikov, a Russian Dhampir, and Rose's love interest
- Dominic Sherwood as Christian Ozera, a social outcast Moroi due to his parents willingly becoming Strigoi, and Lissa's love interest
- Cameron Monaghan as Mason Ashford, a Dhampir who is one of Rose's close friends, and also a novice Guardian like her
- Sami Gayle as Mia Rinaldi, a non-royal Moroi whose element is water
- Sarah Hyland as Natalie Dashkov, a very awkward royal Moroi, and a good friend of Lissa and Rose
- Claire Foy as Sonya Karp, a Moroi teacher who turned herself into a Strigoi
- Ashley Charles as Jesse Zeklos, a royal Moroi who specializes in fire
- Edward Holcroft as Aaron Drozdov, Lissa's ex-boyfriend who started dating Mia
- Chris Mason as Ray Sarcozy, a Moroi specializes in fire and Jesse's friend
- Ben Peel as Spiridon, one of Victor's guardians
- Joely Richardson as Queen Tatiana Ivashkov, the ruler of the Moroi and Dhampirs
- Olga Kurylenko as Ellen Kirova, the headmistress at St. Vladimir's Academy
- Gabriel Byrne as Victor Dashkov, a royal Moroi, Natalie's father and a close friend of Lissa's father

Additionally, Dominique Tipper appears as Gabriela, a Dhampir Guardian, while Nick Gillard portrays Kenneth, a Moroi who works for Victor. Bronté Norman-Terrell appears as Camilla Conta, and Harry Bradshaw as Bruno, two students at St. Vladimir's Academy. Ramon Tikaram portrays Mr. Meisner, a teacher at the academy. Lissa's family is portrayed by Rory Fleck-Byrne as Andre, Alexander Abadzis as Eric, and Elizabeth Conboy as Rhea Dragomir.

Richelle Mead makes a non-speaking cameo appearances as a teacher, passing by Rose and Lissa.

== Production ==
=== Development ===
In June 2010, Preger Entertainment optioned the film rights to the Vampire Academy series. On July 6, 2010, they announced that producer Don Murphy had joined them to help bring the series to the big screen. On December 17, 2012, it was announced that Daniel Waters was writing the script and subsequently, it was announced that his brother, Mark Waters, would direct.

=== Casting ===
Casting for the film was undertaken by Marci Liroff and Reg Poerscout-Edgerton.

On February 1, 2013, it was announced that Zoey Deutch, Australian actress Lucy Fry, and Russian actor Danila Kozlovsky were cast as Rose Hathaway, Lissa Dragomir, and Dimitri Belikov, respectively. On April 29, 2013, it was announced that Olga Kurylenko had been cast as Headmistress Ellen Kirova. On May 10, additional cast members were announced to be Cameron Monaghan, Sami Gayle, Claire Foy, and Ashley Charles for the roles of Mason Ashford, Mia Rinaldi, Sonya Karp and Jesse Zeklos respectively.

On May 18, it was announced that Gabriel Byrne would play Victor Dashkov, Lissa's uncle, while Sarah Hyland would play Natalie Dashkov, Victor's daughter and fellow student at the academy. Joely Richardson played Queen Tatiana Ivashkov, leader of the Moroi Vampires and Dominic Sherwood played Christian Ozera, Lissa's love interest. Two days later, the producers posted a behind the scenes photograph revealing the names of a few more cast members.

=== Pre-production ===
The title was initially changed from Vampire Academy to Vampire Academy: Blood Sisters. This was the name of the first book in many foreign languages and a different name for each film was wanted. The title was later changed back to simply Vampire Academy. The project was officially greenlit on April 1, 2013. The producers announced on their official Facebook page that principal photography would take place in the United Kingdom with additional photography planned in and around Montana, and that director Mark Waters had started pre-production work in London.

The Academy exterior shots were filmed at Chaterhouse School in Surrey. Director Mark Waters said that "as soon as I saw that courtyard I had that exhilarating feeling of everything locking into place. This school was not just my mental image of St. Vladimir's...it was better." The school allowed the production to shoot at the location during the school holidays. Waters believed the location really defined the look of the film.

To prepare for their roles as Dhampir novices and guardians, Deutch, Monaghan and Kozlovsky underwent rigorous training sessions and workouts.

=== Filming ===
Principal photography commenced on May 28, 2013, in London, at Pinewood Studios in Buckinghamshire, England. Filming officially ended on July 20.

== Soundtrack ==
Vampire Academy: Music from the Motion Picture

Soundtrack album by various artists
- Released: February 4, 2014
- Length: 44:28
- Label: UMe

On January 14, 2014, the track listing of the official soundtrack was unveiled. The album itself was released on February 4, 2014, including tracks by artists such as Katy Perry, Iggy Azalea, Sky Ferreira, Natalia Kills, and Au Revoir Simone. It also contains Chvrches' cover of Bauhaus' 1979 song "Bela Lugosi's Dead", featured during the film's end credits.

No.	Title	Performer(s)	Length
1.	"In Your Grave"	Jaymes Bullet	3:11
2.	"Red Lips" (DSL Remix)	Sky Ferreira	3:50
3.	"Nice and Slow"	Max Frost	3:50
4.	"Thea"	Goldfrapp	4:48
5.	"Boys Don't Cry"	Natalia Kills	3:36
6.	"Bounce"	Iggy Azalea	2:46
7.	"Sinful Nature"	Bear in Heaven	3:30
8.	"Think About It"	Naughty Boy featuring Wiz Khalifa and Ella Eyre	3:05
9.	"Rats"	Rainy Milo	4:32
10.	"Spiritual"	Katy Perry	4:34
11.	"Crazy"	Au Revoir Simone	2:57
12.	"Bela Lugosi's Dead"	Chvrches	3:49
13.	"Felt Mountain"	Goldfrapp	4:14

== Marketing ==
The Weinstein Company, the North American distributor for the film, held a competition where the winner would be able to visit the set in London and meet the cast. The official motion poster was also revealed on July 22, 2013 by Yahoo!. On August 13, three official stills were released by USA Today and later in the day The Weinstein Company released a sneak peek of the teaser trailer.

On August 14, the full official teaser trailer was released on Yahoo! Movies. On September 12, The Weinstein Company started releasing stills and character profile photos on the film's Twitter account. Sherwood, Gayle, Fry and Deutch attended the New York Comic Con for the movie, where a new sizzle reel was previewed by those in attendance. On November 21, the official theatrical trailer was released by Yahoo! Movies.

== Release ==
=== Theatrical ===
The film was originally set to be released on Valentine's Day, but was moved up a week to February 7, 2014, in the United States. In the United Kingdom, the release date had been set for a February 19 release by the film's British distributor Entertainment One, but was pushed back to April 24. However, due to the film's poor box office incomes and critical response, the film was again postponed. It was released as a direct-to-video on July 14.

=== Home media ===
The film was released in the United States on DVD and Blu-ray Disc on May 20, 2014 by Anchor Bay Entertainment and in the United Kingdom on July 14, 2014 by Entertainment One. Special features include an alternate opening, deleted scenes and a conversation with the author of the Vampire Academy book series, Richelle Mead.

== Reception ==
=== Box office ===
The film underperformed and made $3,921,742 in its opening weekend, ranking number 7 in the U.S. box office. The film later opened in a further 12 countries, but did not pass the $1 million mark, grossing just $619,381.

As of February 16, 2014, the film had grossed $6,663,650, with many suggesting that poor box office returns would effectively end any plans for a sequel. After a month of theatrical release in the U.S., Vampire Academy grossed just $7,742,311 at the box office. The film was expected to be a big hit in both Australia and Russia, but only made $1.6 million in each country. As of April 10, 2014, the film had earned $7,791,979 domestically and $7,600,000 overseas for a worldwide total of $15,391,979, therefore failing to recoup its $30 million budget making the film a box office bomb.

Poor international box office takings led to the cancelation of the film's theatrical release in Brazil and the United Kingdom.

=== Critical reception ===
Vampire Academy was not screened for critics. On the review aggregator website Rotten Tomatoes, 18% of 57 critics' reviews are positive, with an average rating of 3.6/10. The website's consensus reads: "Though it may appeal to its built-in fanbase, Vampire Academy's Twilight-meets-Mean Girls conceit borrows lazily from its predecessors and offers few laughs or thrills to complement its overstuffed backstory." Metacritic, which uses a weighted average, assigned the film a score of 31 out of 100, based on 15 critics, indicating "generally unfavorable" reviews. Audiences surveyed by CinemaScore gave the film a grade "B−" on scale of A to F.

Peter Travers from Rolling Stone gave the film zero stars out of four and wrote, "One idea, mixed with lame jokes, and stretched beyond coherence. Vampire Academy doesn't need a review. It needs a stake in the heart." Dennis Harvey from Variety called it "the crassest possible mashup of Harry Potter and Twilight elements" and compared it negatively to both series. Manohla Dargis from The New York Times said "[Mr. Waters] doesn't seem especially interested in the supernatural parts of Vampire Academy, and he clearly didn't have the budget to make what little hocus pocus there is, magical."

The performances received a mixed response, with Harvey and RogerEbert.com's Susan Wloszczyna negatively comparing Deutch's performance to that of Elliot Page as the titular character in Juno, while Jordan Hoffman of the New York Daily News called her work the film's "breakout" performance while positively comparing her to Page. However, Hoffman criticized Byrne's performance as "obligatory slumming". Harvey described Kozlovsky's acting as "so expressionless that he can in all honesty now say that he never acted in anything called Vampire Academy", while also criticizing Byrne, Richardson, and Kurylenko; Travers also panned the latter three, saying they were "bringing shame on all their reputations". Dargis praised Waters for providing "a conspicuous sympathetic touch" to the performances of Deutch, Fry, Hyland, and Sherwood.

=== Accolades ===
The film garnered nominations at the 2014 Teen Choice Awards for Choice Movie: Comedy and Choice Movie Actress: Comedy for Deutch, but lost both awards to The Other Woman and Emma Roberts for We're the Millers, respectively.

== Canceled sequel and reboot ==
Following the movie's financial failure, no adaptation of the second novel, Frostbite, was announced. On August 4, 2014, Preger Entertainment announced on MTV website that they had found investors for a sequel. However to convince them that there's enough demand, they launched a fundraising campaign on Indiegogo to help fund the rest of the production cost. The campaign was launched on August 6, 2014 and Piers Ashworth was hired to write a script. The campaign failed to reach its goal, resulting in the project cancellation.

On May 19, 2021, it was announced that Peacock had given a series order for a Vampire Academy reboot television series by Julie Plec. The series premiered in 2022 but was canceled by Peacock after one season.
