= Eraser: Reborn =

- Official DVD cover
- Directed by: John Pogue
- Written by: Michael Weiss
- Based on: Characters by: Tony Puryear; Walon Green; Michael S. Chernuchin
- Produced by: Hunt Lowry; Patty Reed
- Starring: Dominic Sherwood; Jacky Lai; McKinley Belcher III; Eddie Ramos
- Cinematography: George Amos
- Edited by: Glenn Garland
- Music by: Mark Kilian
- Production companies: Warner Bros. Home Entertainment Group; Roserock Films; Film Afrika Worldwide
- Distributed by: Warner Bros. Home Entertainment (Note: Released theatrically in Germany by Warner Bros. Pictures)
- Release dates: March 31, 2022 (Germany); June 7, 2022 (United States)
- Running time: 102 minutes
- Country: United States
- Language: English

Eraser: Reborn is a 2022 American action film, that serves as a reboot of the 1996 Eraser, and it is the second installment in the Eraser franchise. Directed by John Pogue from a script by Michael D. Weiss, the plot centers around a secret agency that specializes in engineering the fake deaths of witnesses that need to leave no trace of their existence. Starring British actor Dominic Sherwood in the lead role as U.S. Marshal Mason Pollard, the supporting cast includes Jacky Lai, McKinley Belcher III and Eddie Ramos.

== Plot ==
U.S. Marshal Mason Pollard specializes in "erasing" people – faking the deaths of high-risk witnesses. With the technological advances of the last 25 years, the game has upgraded, and it's just another day at the office when he's assigned to Rina Kimura, a crime boss' wife who's decided to turn state's evidence. As the two flee to Cape Town, South Africa, with a team of merciless assassins on their trail, Pollard discovers he's been set up. Double-crossed and fueled by adrenaline, he needs to be at the top of his game, or he'll be the one who's erased. Permanently.

== Cast ==
- Dominic Sherwood as U.S. Marshal Mason Pollard
- Jacky Lai as Rina Kimura
- McKinley Belcher III as Paul Whitlock
- Eddie Ramos as Sugar Jax

== Production ==
In September 2021, a sequel, which became the reboot of Eraser instead, was announced to be in development with Dominic Sherwood in the lead role. John Pogue was announced as director with a script written by Michael D. Weiss. Jacky Lai co-starred in the movie, while the supporting cast included McKinley Belcher III and Eddie Ramos. Hunt Lowry and Patty Reed served as producers. The project is a joint-venture production between Warner Bros. Home Entertainment Group and Roserock Films. Production took place secretly with principal photography commencing in mid-2021, during the COVID-19 pandemic. The film was distributed by Warner Bros. Home Entertainment.

== Release ==
=== Theatrical ===
Eraser: Reborn premiered in German theatres on March 31, 2022.

=== Home media and streaming ===
Domestically, Eraser: Reborn was released directly to home media on June 7, 2022. It was later released on HBO Max on October 5, 2022.
