= Dark Swan =

Novel sequence by Richelle Mead

- Cover of the first novel in the sequence
- Author: Richelle Mead
- Country: United States
- Language: English
- Genre: Fantasy

Dark Swan is a novel sequence by Richelle Mead. The novels center on Eugenie Markham, a shaman; the shapeshifting Kiyo, her boyfriend; and Dorian, the king of the fairies.

== Publication history ==
There are four books in the series, with another possibly in the far-off future

1. Storm Born (August 5, 2008): Nominee - 2008 Reviewers' Choice Awards - Best Urban Fantasy Novel
2. Thorn Queen (July 28, 2009)
3. Iron Crowned (February 22, 2011)
4. Shadow Heir (December 27, 2011)
