= Shadow Kiss =

2008 novel by Richelle Mead

- Cover of Shadow Kiss
- Author: Richelle Mead
- Cover artist: Emilian Gregory, Michael Frost
- Language: English
- Series: Vampire Academy
- Genre: Young adult, Urban fantasy, Dark fantasy, Paranormal romance
- Publisher: Razorbill
- Publication date: November 13, 2008
- Publication place: United States
- Media type: Print (Soft), e-Book (Kindle, Nook)
- Pages: 448
- ISBN: 978-1-59514-197-2
- OCLC: 221152468
- LC Class: PZ7.M478897 Shc 2008
- Preceded by: Frostbite
- Followed by: Blood Promise

Shadow Kiss is a vampire novel written by Richelle Mead. It is the third novel in the Vampire Academy series, and was preceded by Frostbite. The release of the book pushed the Vampire Academy series into the New York Times Best Seller list for the first time, making its debut at #4. Shadow Kiss continues the story of the main character, Rose Hathaway and her education in becoming a Guardian.

== Plot ==
Rose, in shock over Mason's death, prepares with the rest of the novices for the Qualifying Exam, in which the novices protect the Moroi students from "attacks" by "Strigoi" (their Dhampir teachers). Rose is positive that she will be paired with Lissa, but instead is paired with Christian Ozera, while Eddie Castile (Mason's best friend) is paired with Lissa. Rose complains to her teachers, but ultimately resigns herself to guarding Christian. During the first attack on Christian, Rose sees Mason's ghost and freezes – and is accused of being a sore loser by her teachers. In a sudden twist, Christian is the only person who truly believes that Rose didn't screw up on purpose.

Meanwhile, Rose overhears that Victor Dashkov's trial is coming soon – and that she and Lissa aren't going to be called to testify. She begs Dimitri to find a way to get them into the trial, and he promises to see what he can do. Adrian and Lissa are growing closer (in a teacher-student sense) while practicing their Spirit use, making Christian jealous. After Rose settles a fight between Lissa and Christian, she begins to sense changes in herself – mainly feelings of intense anger (even more than is usual). Christian is also approached by Jesse Zeklos to join a secret "club" he and Ralf have started, though Christian turns them down. Rose becomes suspicious, and tries to learn more about this club, which she later learns is called "Mână".

Although Dimitri attempts to get Rose and Lissa into court to testify, it is ultimately Adrian who gains them entry. On the plane ride to Court, Rose is struck with a horrible migraine, but shakes it off as they arrive at Court; Dimitri and Alberta accompany Rose, Lissa, Christian, Eddie, and Adrian. Dimitri and Rose go to visit Victor in jail, who is as maddeningly pleasant as ever, and threatens to reveal what really happened between Dimitri and Rose the night he kidnapped Lissa. Dimitri threatens to have him killed in jail, but Victor taunts them with his knowledge. The day of the trial, Victor does reveal that Rose and Dimitri almost slept together, but everyone in the courtroom automatically believe this to be another one of Victor's lies. He is sent to prison by the court. Lissa meets with Queen Tatiana to discuss her future; she agrees to go to a college close to Court, and voices her opinion on Moroi fighting with Dhamphirs. Rose goes in to meet with Tatiana next – who insists that Rose stop sleeping with Adrian and call off their "engagement". Rose is stunned, and listens to Tatiana call her everything but a whore. Tatiana then reveals that she has been planning a marriage between Adrian and Lissa, and that they don't need to be carrying any of her "emotional baggage" around with them.

Rose shrugs off the queen's accusations and meets up with Lissa, lying to her about her conversation with the queen. Lissa takes Rose for a manicure, where Rose is treated by a young man, Ambrose, who turns out to be a Dhamphir and the queen's blood whore. He takes Lissa and Rose to a fortune teller, who gives Rose a rather boring reading. Dimitri finds them and agrees to have his fortune read. The fortune teller predicts that Dimitri will "lose that which he treasures most".

On the plane ride back to the academy, Rose gets another horrible migraine, this time drawing the attention of Alberta and Dimitri. When they are forced to make an unscheduled stop at a human airport to refuel during a snow storm, Rose's migraine becomes much worse, and when she steps off the plane, she sees the ghosts of Lissa's parents and brother, along with many others. When she comes to, she is in the infirmary back at the academy. Rose is finally forced to come clean about seeing Mason's ghost, and she is ordered to see a counselor. Her "guardian time" with Christian is also limited. While back at school, her temper still increases, though she does successfully defeat Dimitri as a "Strigoi" while guarding Christian. Lissa is approached by Jesse and Ralf to join Mână, and she accepts their invitation as a chance to spy on them, without Rose's knowing. Lissa is led into the woods and attacked by Jesse and the other magic users. Rose senses something is terribly wrong and runs to Lissa's aid. She beats Lissa's torturers – fellow students — and Lissa tortures Jesse using Spirit. Rose realizes that whenever Lissa uses Spirit, dark emotions fill Lissa — which caused her to cut herself in the first book — and tells Lissa to let the dark emotion flow through their connection and into Rose — which is what has been causing Rose's mood swings and violent behavior. Lissa obeys, and Rose suddenly begins beating Jesse fiercely. Alberta and Dimitri appear, and Alberta has several guards take Jesse away, while ordering Dimitri to handle Rose, who is still in a manic state.

Dimitri takes Rose to an old cabin that Tasha Ozera stayed in when she visited the academy. Rose attempts to run to the infirmary, where she knows they would take Jesse, but Dimitri subdues her and forces her to let go of her anger. She collapses, terrified that she is going crazy. Dimitri listens to Rose's explanation and insists that he won't let Rose go crazy. They then make love thus causing Rose to lose her virginity . Sometime during the night, Rose senses death nearby. It turns out to be a Strigoi. She's sent to the Moroi dorms. Here she and the other novices are told to stay put. Rose is sent to guard a small window, where she is finally given a silver stake. She senses immense fear from Lissa, and learns that Christian is in the church, where he was supposed to meet Lissa to talk about Jesse and Mână. Eddie and several other novices are guarding Lissa and the other Moroi, so Rose sneaks out the small window to go after Christian. She and Christian rush to the elementary school, where there would be much less security, and combine Rose's fighting skills and Strigoi sense with Christian's Fire magic to destroy many Strigoi. After the battle, Rose learns that this is one of the biggest groups of Strigoi – who are typically loners – to ever attack any Moroi or Dhamphirs. Along with many dead guardians and Moroi, several Dhamphirs and Moroi were captured by the retreating Strigoi — including Eddie. Rose's mother, Janine, comes to the aid of the guardians with reinforcements, and with Mason's help, Rose figures out where the Strigoi are holding the hostages. Before they leave, Dimitri tells Rose that he is going to ask to be placed with a different Moroi close to Court, so that he and Rose can be together.

Janine, Dimitri, and Rose plan a counterattack, and reluctantly enlist the help of other Dhamphir novices and, surprisingly, several Moroi teachers to harness their power as a weapon. When the army reaches the caves the Strigoi are hiding in, Rose is forced to stay outside while Janine and Dimitri lead the attack inside. Once all the hostages are out, Rose goes into the caves to assist the retreat. Just as she thinks everyone she loves is safe, Dimitri is attacked and left behind as Janine forces Rose out of the caves.

Rose later finds out that Dimitri's body wasn't found. Another team of guardians returns to the caves the next day, confirming that Dimitri was not killed, but was made Strigoi. Rose realizes that the fortune teller's prediction came true: "you will lose what you value most so treasure it while you can" – not herself, as Rose believed, but his soul. Rose decides to leave the academy to go after Dimitri and kill him. After she files the necessary papers, Lissa meets her just before she leaves and reveals that she figured out Rose was in love with Dimitri. Lissa begs Rose to stay, even tries to use compulsion on her, but Rose snaps and tells Lissa that all her life she's been told that Lissa comes first. Rose says that she needs to do something for herself for once. Rose asks Adrian for money, which he willingly gives to her, and asks her if she will come back. Rose says she will eventually, and tells Adrian that she will give him a chance – go out with him – when she comes back. As she leaves the academy, Rose says good bye to Mason, then heads off to Siberia, where she believes Dimitri would go first; back to his hometown.

== Sequel ==
Shadow Kiss's sequel Blood Promise was released on August 25, 2009.

== See also ==
- Vampire Academy
- Richelle Mead
