= Caity =

2026 American drama film

- Directed by: Lindsay Calleran
- Written by: Lindsay Calleran
- Produced by: Mary Elizabeth Monda; Malcolm Thorndike Nicholson
- Starring: Morgan Spector; Chiara Aurelia; Zach Cherry; Michelle Mao; Jordan Hull; Olivia Rouyre
- Cinematography: Jack Davis
- Edited by: Joe Stankus
- Music by: Kevin Donald
- Production company: Curious Gremlin
- Release date: June 7, 2026 (Tribeca)
- Running time: 95 minutes
- Country: United States
- Language: English

Caity is a 2026 American drama film written and directed by Lindsay Calleran in their directorial debut. It stars Morgan Spector, Chiara Aurelia, Zach Cherry, Michelle Mao, Jordan Hull and Olivia Rouyre.

It had its world premiere at the Tribeca Festival on June 7, 2026.

== Premise ==
16-year-old Caity balances running her family's haunted house, juggling a new crush, the arrival of twins to work alongside her and her father's sobriety.

== Cast ==
- Morgan Spector as Paul
- Chiara Aurelia as Caity
- Zach Cherry as Todd
- Michelle Mao as Petey
- Jordan Hull as Hannah
- Olivia Rouyre as Dana
- Emily Shaffer as Robin
- Christian Lees as Sean
- Jonah Lees as Liam

== Production ==
In October 2025, it was announced Morgan Spector and Chiara Aurelia had joined the cast of the film, with Lindsay Calleran directing from a screenplay they wrote. Principal photography had concluded and took place at Kevin McCurdy's Haunted Mansion in Wappingers Falls, New York. In November 2025, Zach Cherry, Michelle Mao, Jordan Hull, Olivia Rouyre, Emily Shaffer, Christian Lees and Jonah Lees were announced to be cast in the film.

The film previously participated in the Sundance Institute Catalyst and Creative Producing Lab, Gotham Project Week, and the Outfest Screenwriters Lab.

== Release ==
It had its world premiere at the Tribeca Festival on June 7, 2026.
