= Frostbite (Mead novel) =

2008 novel by Richelle Mead

- Cover of Frostbite
- Author: Richelle Mead
- Cover artist: Emilian Gregory, Fanelie Rosier
- Language: English
- Series: Vampire Academy
- Genre: Young adult, Urban fantasy, Dark fantasy, Paranormal romance
- Publisher: Razorbill
- Publication date: April 10, 2008
- Publication place: United States
- Media type: Print (Hardcover, Softcover, Large-print), e-Book (Kindle, Nook)
- Pages: 336
- ISBN: 978-1-59514-175-0
- OCLC: 732847639
- LC Class: PZ7.M478897 Fro 2008
- Preceded by: Vampire Academy
- Followed by: Shadow Kiss

Frostbite is a vampire novel written by Richelle Mead. It is the second novel in the #1 New York Times bestselling series, Vampire Academy. Frostbite continues the story of the main character, Rose Hathaway including her bond with Princess Vasilisa "Lissa" Dragomir, her budding romance with her instructor Dimitri Belikov, and her education in becoming a Guardian.

== Plot ==
The story begins with Rose and Dimitri traveling to meet the legendary guardian Arthur Schoenberg for Rose's Qualifier Exam. Once they arrive at the home of the Moroi family he protects, they discover a bloody massacre of the entire family and their guardians, including Arthur. Rose also discovers a silver stake, a magical device which Strigoi cannot touch, meaning the Strigoi must have had human assistance in their attack. The massacre puts the vampire community on high alert. After that, Dimitri takes Rose to meet a friend of his named Tasha Ozera, who is Christian's aunt. To keep the students at St. Vladimir's Academy safe, a ski trip to a lodge owned by a wealthy Moroi family is required right after Christmas.

During the ski trip, panic sets in when news of another Strigoi attack on a royal Moroi family spreads, where one of the dead was Mia's mother. During her stay at the lodge, Rose talks to her mother and finds out that Tasha is not only a friend of Dimitri, but she also wants him to be her guardian, and even more astonishingly that she wants to have a relationship with him and as it seems Dimitri is all up for it; she also meets a royal Moroi named Adrian Ivashkov, who shows obvious interest in Rose, and later becomes friendly with Lissa after they both discover they are Spirit users. During Adrian's pool party, Mason, his friend Eddie, and Mia begin voicing their opinions about hunting Strigoi. After a heated argument with Dimitri, Rose tells Mason confidential information about the possible whereabouts of the Strigois' hideouts. Using Rose's information, Mia, Mason, and Eddie sneak out of the ski lodge and travel to Spokane, Washington, to hunt down the Strigoi themselves. Rose discovers their plan, and she and Christian run out to stop them.

Rose and Christian find the group and convince them to return to the lodge. However, they are ambushed by Strigoi led by Isaiah, who hold them captive for days, threatening to kill the young novices and convince either Christian or Mia to turn into Strigoi by killing one of their friends. Rose and Christian eventually come up with a plan to escape, and they all manage to get out of the house into the protection of the light, except Rose, who is left fighting Isaiah and his subordinate Elena. Mason's neck gets snapped, killing him instantly when he returns and attempted to help Rose. Rose then kills Isaiah and Elena by beheading them with a dull sword in rage from Mason's death, and then collapses into shock, just as Guardians arrive. Once back at St. Vladimir's, Rose receives two molnija marks for her Strigoi kills. Dimitri also tells her that he turned down Tasha's offer to become her guardian, admitting that his heart is with Rose and will never leave her, then he kisses her.

== See also ==
- Vampire Academy
- Richelle Mead
