= Georgina Kincaid =

Book series by Richelle Mead

- Cover of the first book in the series
- Author: Richelle Mead
- Country: United States
- Language: English
- Genre: Dark fantasy Horror; Romantic fantasy Urban fantasy Vampire

The Georgina Kincaid series is a collection of eight urban fantasy novels written by Richelle Mead. The series is written in a first-person perspective following the main character, Georgina Kincaid, who is a succubus with a heart, who is working at a local book store called Emerald City Books & Cafe.

== Books ==
1. Succubus Blues (2007)
2. Brushstrokes
3. Succubus on Top (2008)
4. City of Demons (2016)
5. Succubus Dreams (2008)
6. Succubus Heat (2009)
7. Succubus Shadows (2010)
8. Succubus Revealed (2011)

== Succubus Blues ==
Succubus Blues is the first novel in the series. It introduces the character of Georgina Kincaid, an immortal (though still very human) succubus, her coworkers at her human job, and her damned co-workers at her real job. Despite her wholesome and dull position at a Seattle bookstore, Georgina is charged with tempting men to sin so that she can score points for team Hell, and recharge her own personal magical essence. The status quo is upset when her favorite author comes to town for a book signing and immortals around her start inexplicably dying.

Film rights for Succubus Blues have been sold to Fox TV.

== Succubus on Top (Succubus Nights in the UK) ==
Succubus on Top is the second novel in the series.

== Succubus Dreams ==
Succubus Dreams is the third novel in the series.

== Succubus Heat ==
Succubus Heat is the fourth novel in the series. RT Book Reviews found it amusing but said the plot dragged; they awarded 3 stars. It was 4th equal in Publishers Weekly's BHB Reader's Choice Best Books of 2009.

== Succubus Shadows ==
Succubus Shadows is the fifth novel in the series.

== Succubus Revealed ==
Succubus Revealed is the sixth novel in the series.

== City of Demons ==
City of Demons is a novella in the Georgina Kincaid series. It is found in the anthology Eternal Lover and takes place between the second (On Top) and third (Dreams) titles.
