= Vampire Academy (novel) =

Novel by Richelle Mead

- Author: Richelle Mead
- Cover artist: Emilian Gregory, Fanelie Rosier
- Language: English
- Series: Vampire Academy
- Genre: Young adult, Urban fantasy, Dark fantasy, Paranormal romance
- Published: 2007 (Razorbill)
- Publication place: United States
- Media type: Print (Hardcover, Softcover; Large-print), e-Book (Kindle, Nook)
- Pages: 332
- ISBN: 978-1-59514-174-3
- OCLC: 732847643
- LC Class: PZ7.M478897 Vam 2007
- Followed by: Frostbite

Vampire Academy is the first out of six books in the worldwide bestselling series Vampire Academy by American author Richelle Mead.

This book chronicles the life of 17-year-old Rosemarie Hathaway, commonly known as Rose, a dhampir and her Moroi best friend Vasilisa "Lissa" Dragomir after being brought back to their school "St Vladimir's Academy" after being on the run for two years.

The novel was adapted into a film, also titled Vampire Academy, released on February 7, 2014 in the United States.

== Plot ==
Rose Hathaway and her best friend, Moroi Princess Vasilisa "Lissa" Dragomir, have been living in secrecy after escaping from St. Vladimir's Academy boarding school a year ago. Rose, a seventeen-year-old Dhampir guardian-in-training, belongs to a group of vampire-human hybrids who are trained to protect the Moroi. The Moroi are mortal vampires with magical powers and royal bloodlines, but they have a normal lifespan and can die. The Guardians are to protect their Moroi from the immortal Strigoi. Moroi can turn into Strigoi if they drain their victims completely of blood or if they are turned, and the Strigoi have been massacring the Moroi relentlessly.

The girls' peaceful existence is disrupted when they are found and forced to return to St. Vladimir's Academy. As they navigate their way through the academy, Lissa faces isolation from her peers while Rose finds herself developing feelings for Dimitri Belikov, her Russian Dhampir mentor and fellow Guardian.

Mysterious messages threatening Lissa start to appear, written in blood on her wall and an exploding memorial to her family in the school church. They suspect that it is the work of classmate Mia Rinaldi, who had dated Lissa's now-deceased, non-monogamous brother Andre. Mia directs her hatred towards Lissa as the only surviving member of the Dragomir line.

Manipulating two other students using sex, Mia persuades them to help her spread rumors about Rose. Moroi Christian Ozera, viewed poorly by his peers as both his parents became Strigoi, tries to romance Lissa. Rose blocks him by lying to them both. Despite this, Christian and Lissa begin to bond regardless.

Later, Rose delves into an investigation regarding the disappearance of Sonya Karp, a teacher who had aided her and Lissa in their escape. Through video footage, Rose uncovers the unsettling truth that Karp had become mentally unstable due to her use of Spirit Magic. Additionally, Rose makes a shocking revelation that Lissa possesses the same rare power as the school's founder, St. Vladimir - the power of Spirit. This extraordinary ability allows the user to heal and save lives, but at the cost of gradually draining their own life energy with each use.

Demanding answers, Rose confronts headmistress Ellen Kirova and insists on accessing classified information about Karp. Kirova discloses that Karp had turned into a Strigoi and escaped before vanishing completely. Simultaneously, a disturbing occurrence unfolds as dead animals mysteriously appear wherever Lissa goes. During the Equinox Dance, Rose uncovers the truth that Mia is not solely responsible for the dead animals. As tension rises, Lissa is suddenly abducted, prompting Rose, Dimitri, and Christian to embark on a frantic rescue mission.

The mastermind behind Lissa's kidnapping and the threats against her is revealed to be Victor Dashkov, a former contender for the throne plagued by the chronic disease known as Sandovsky's Syndrome. Victor's sinister plan revolves around using Lissa as a means to cure himself, even though this cure would ultimately result in Lissa sacrificing her own life. After successfully capturing Victor and confining him in the secure cells beneath the school, he discloses to Rose the reason for their unbreakable bond - Rose is "shadow-kissed," having been brought back to life by Lissa's magic after the car crash that killed Lissa’s brother and parents.

While they are talking, Victor's daughter Natalie, who befriended both Lissa and Rose and was a very insecure student there, is enacting the tools of his escape. She'd turned Strigoi by draining her crush to death. Dimitri comes and kills Natalie and detains Victor.

During Vampire Queen Tatiana Ivashkov's speech, Lissa steps in and gives a speech of her own. She announces that Spirit is her type of magic, and that it is thanks to Rose that she can master it. Rose then meets Dimitri outside and asks about his feelings for her. He states that he can't love her because if there was any danger between Rose and Lissa, he would save her instead of Lissa. She gives Dimitri a kiss on the cheek and walks back to the academy.

== Reception ==
It was listed on the list of Quick Picks for Reluctant Young Adult Readers and recommended by Booklist, teenbookstoo.com, and Voice of Youth Advocates (VOYA). Vampire Academy was also voted number four after Eclipse by Stephenie Meyer, Harry Potter and the Deathly Hallows by J.K. Rowling, and Diary of a Wimpy Kid on ALA's teens top 10. The Vampire Academy series was also one of the New York Times Bestseller top ten in the children's books series division.
