= The Golden Lily (Mead novel) =

2012 novel by Richelle Mead

- Cover of the first edition of The Golden Lily
- Author: Richelle Mead
- Language: English
- Series: Bloodlines
- Genre: Young adult Urban fantasy Paranormal romance
- Publisher: Razorbill
- Publication date: June 12, 2012
- Publication place: United States
- Media type: Print (Hardcover)
- Pages: 400
- ISBN: 978-1-59514-318-1
- OCLC: 738336354
- Preceded by: Bloodlines
- Followed by: The Indigo Spell

The Golden Lily is a 2012 urban fantasy young adult novel by New York Times bestselling author Richelle Mead and is the second novel of the Bloodlines series. The book follows several teenaged students as they deal with forbidden romances, the Strigoi, and the supernatural in general.

== Summary ==
The book follows Sydney Sage, a young Alchemist that is forced to hide inside a ritzy boarding school in Palm Springs, California so that she can protect Jillian (Jill) Dragomir, a Moroi princess. The Alchemists are one of a group of humans who dabble in magic and serve to bridge the worlds of humans and vampires. They protect vampire secrets—and human lives.

There are those who want Jill dead by an assassin's hand in order to provoke a civil war within the Moroi court, and to take Jill's sister Moroi Queen, Lissa off of her throne. The assignment provides Sydney a way to redeem herself from previous disgrace due to helping a Dhampir who was falsely accused of murder, Rose Hathaway, who was also Lissa's best friend. But her close proximity with Jill, the Dhampir Eddie, and the Moroi Spirit user Adrian, cause her to question everything she thought she knew about herself, Alchemists, and the world in general.

During all of this, Sydney finds herself also questioning her relationship with Brayden, someone who is seemingly perfect for her in every way. Even as she cares for him, Sydney finds her attentions also being drawn to someone that she can never be allowed to be with, Adrian. As secrets come to light and loyalties are given a trial by fire, Sydney has to find a way to make it through all of this with herself and all that she cares for intact.

== Reception ==
Reviews for The Golden Lily were generally positive, receiving four stars from RT Book Reviews.

== Characters ==
- Sydney Sage - The main character throughout the series
- Adrian Ivashkov - One of Sydneys' friends who is secretly in love with Sydney
- Jill Mastrano - The bastard sister of the queen
- Eddie Castile - A dhampir, who secretly loves Jill
- Dimitri Belikov – a former Strigoi, Christian's Guardian and Rose's boyfriend
- Angeline Dawes – a Keeper dhampir and Jill's roommate, responsible for her protection
- Jacqueline Terwilliger – Sydney's history teacher and a witch

== Timeline of Events ==
- Sydney goes into the rehabilitation center and sees Keith and another disturbed mind.
