= McKinley Belcher III =

American actor (born 1984)

- Born: Atlanta, Georgia, U.S.
- Education: Belmont University (BA); University of Southern California (MFA)
- Occupation: Actor
- Years active: 2010–present
- Spouse: Blake Fox (m. 2023)

McKinley Belcher III is an American actor and writer, known for his breakout role as Detective Michael Ledroit in Netflix's Eric, for which he was nominated for a 2025 BAFTA TV Award in Supporting Actor. He also starred in the Netflix limited series Zero Day opposite Robert De Niro and Jesse Plemons, as Samuel Diggs in the PBS television series Mercy Street, Anthony Carter in the Fox genre drama The Passage, and as Agent Trevor Evans in Netflix crime thriller Ozark.

== Early life and education ==
McKinley Belcher was born in Atlanta, Georgia at Grady Memorial Hospital, the first son of McKinley Belcher Jr. and Pamela McGhee Belcher.

The family later moved to Powder Springs, where he attended elementary and middle school. Belcher graduated from Campbell High School in Smyrna, Georgia, in 2002, where he was in the International Baccalaureate program and ran track and cross country.

He went to Belmont University in Nashville, Tennessee, and graduated in 2006 with a B.A. in Communication Studies and Political Science. At Belmont he competed on the Speech and Debate Team, winning awards as a debater and individual speaker. He subsequently went to USC School of Dramatic Arts in Los Angeles, where he won the Ava Greenwald Memorial Award and graduated in 2010 with an MFA in Acting.

== Career ==
=== Theatre ===
Belcher appeared Off-Broadway in Romeo and Juliet at Classic Stage Company in 2013. In 2016 he won a Drama Desk Award for his performance as amateur boxer Fish in the ensemble of Marco Ramirez's The Royale at Lincoln Center, directed by Rachel Chavkin. He also appeared as Sam in Darko Tresnjak's 2015 world premiere production of Rear Window at Hartford Stage, alongside Kevin Bacon.

Belcher played the dual roles of Teddy and Nicholas in the world premiere of Ken Urban's A Guide for the Homesick at the Huntington Theatre Company in 2017, winning both an Elliot Norton Award for Outstanding Actor and an IRNE Award for Best Actor. In 2019 Belcher played Rashad in MCC's off-Broadway production of The Light, for which he was nominated for an Outer Critics Circle Award for Outstanding Actor in a Play.

In 2020, Belcher made his Broadway debut as Private Louis Henson (a role originated by Samuel L. Jackson off-Broadway) in the Broadway premiere of A Soldier's Play at the Roundabout Theatre Company. He made history as Happy Loman in the 2022-2023 Broadway production of Death of a Salesman, featuring the first African-American Loman family on Broadway alongside Wendell Pierce, Sharon D. Clarke, Khris Davis and André De Shields.

=== Film and television ===
Belcher made his film debut in John Sayles' 2013 independent film Go for Sisters, playing Lisa Gay Hamilton's son Rodney.

In 2015 he appeared in David Simon's HBO mini-series Show Me a Hero as LaTanya Richardson Jackson's son Dwayne Meeks, directed by Paul Haggis. Belcher had his first experience as a series regular as Samuel Diggs in two seasons of PBS's Ridley Scott-produced Civil War drama Mercy Street. His character, Samuel, is a free man who works as a laborer, but harbors secret knowledge and ability in medicine.

In 2018 he was cast as Anthony Carter in Fox's drama The Passage, based on Justin Cronin's novel by the same name.

Belcher worked with David Simon again, in HBO's 2022 limited series We Own This City, playing real-life BPD veteran and Gun Trace Task Force officer Momodu Gondo. In 2022, Belcher also joined the cast of Netflix's live-action adaptation of the Japanese manga One Piece as Arlong.

In 2024 he played a leading role as police officer Michael Ledroit in the Netflix drama miniseries Eric.

== Personal life ==
Belcher married artist Blake Fox on January 17, 2023, in Hoboken, NJ in a wedding that was officiated by Belcher's Death of a Salesman co-star André De Shields.

== Filmography ==
=== Film ===
Year	Title	Role	Notes
2013	Go for Sisters	Rodney	
2018	Mapplethorpe	Milton Moore	
2018	Trial By Fire	Ponchai	
2019	The Art of Racing in the Rain	Mark Finn	
2019	Marriage Story	Lighting Designer	
2022	Eraser: Reborn	Paul Whitlock	

=== Television ===
Year	Title	Role	Notes
2010	Law & Order: Los Angeles	Timmy Lutz	Episode: "Hondo Field"
2011	Rizzoli & Isles	Pvt. Lawrence	Episode: "We Don't Need Another Hero"
2012	Louie	Gravedigger #1	Episode: "Barney/Never"
2014	Elementary	Reeling Detective	Episode: "Enough Nemesis to Go Around"
2014–2017	Power	Marcus	4 episodes
2015	Madam Secretary	Officer Wilson	Episode: "Chains of Command"
2015	Chicago PD	Aubrey Carrington	Episode: "What Do You Do"
2015	Unbreakable Kimmy Schmidt	Bryce	Episode: "Kimmy Goes Outside!"
2015	Show Me a Hero	Dwayne Meeks	5 episodes
2016–2017	Mercy Street	Samuel Diggs	12 episodes
2017–2022	Ozark	Agent Trevor Evans	16 episodes
2019	The Passage	Anthony Carter	10 episodes
2020	The Good Lord Bird	Broadnax	6 episodes
2021	FBI	Ben Harris	Episode: "Clean Slate"
2022	We Own This City	Det Momodu "G Money" Gondo	6 episodes
2023	One Piece	Arlong	4 episodes
2024	Eric	Michael Ledroit	Miniseries
2025	Zero Day	Carl Otieno	Limited Series

=== Theater ===
Year	Title	Role	Category	Theatre	Ref.
2019-2020	A Soldier's Play	Private Louis Henson	Broadway	Roundabout Theatre Company	
2022-2023	Death of a Salesman	Happy Loman	Broadway	Hudson Theatre	

== Awards and nominations ==
Year	Awards	Category	Nominated work	Result	Ref.
2016	Drama Desk Award	Special Award for Outstanding Ensemble	The Royale	Won	
2019	Outer Critics Circle Awards	Outstanding Actor in a Play	The Light	Nominated	
2021	Screen Actors Guild Awards	Outstanding Performance by an Ensemble in a Drama Serie	Ozark	Nominated	
2025	Royal Television Society Awards	Supporting Actor	Eric	Nominated	
2025	BAFTA Television Awards	Supporting Actor	Eric	Nominated	
