= Last Sacrifice =

2010 novel by Richelle Mead

- Cover of Last Sacrifice
- Author: Richelle Mead
- Language: English
- Series: Vampire Academy
- Genre: Young adult Urban fantasy Dark fantasy Paranormal romance
- Publisher: Razorbill
- Publication date: December 7, 2010
- Publication place: United States
- Media type: Print (Hard, Soft) e-Book (Kindle, Nook)
- Pages: 594
- ISBN: 978-1-59514-306-8
- OCLC: 435421330
- LC Class: PZ7.M478897 Las 2010
- Preceded by: Spirit Bound
- Followed by: Bloodlines Series

Last Sacrifice is the sixth book in the #1 New York Times bestselling series, Vampire Academy by Richelle Mead. It is the last book in the original storyline, but Mead will continue writing more Vampire Academy books in a spinoff series.

Lead character and dhampir Rosemarie Hathaway is locked in Moroi jail after being framed in the cold-blooded murder of the Moroi Queen. The punishment for this crime is immediate execution. At the same time, she is faced with the challenge of somehow locating Princess Vasilisa Dragomir's lone remaining relative, her secretly existing illegitimate sibling.

== Plot ==
The novel begins with Rose in her prison cell contemplating the charges brought against her and occasionally using the bond to slip into Lissa's mind to view goings-on at Court. During Queen Tatiana’s funeral, bas-reliefs outside the church suddenly blow up, causing chaos, and acting as a distraction for the guardians. Rose is soon broken out of prison by Mikhail, Eddie, Adrian, Abe, and Dimitri. Dimitri takes Rose out of Court and they drive for hours until they reach Sydney Sage, the Alchemist Rose met in Siberia, who is also aiding in the escape. They continue traveling until reaching West Virginia, where Rose discovers she is to be kept in a motel until her friends back at Court can clear her name. However, she insists on leaving and helping out, but after Dimitri halts her escape, Rose convinces him and Sydney to look for Lissa’s half-sibling. For safety, Sydney takes them to the Keepers, a strange group of Moroi, dhampirs, and humans. Later, they find out the sole person who holds the information needed to find Lissa’s sibling: Sonya Karp, who was once teacher at St. Vladimir's but is now a Strigoi. The Dashkov brothers invade Rose’s dreams and they later meet up with her at Sonya's house in Kentucky, where Robert changes her back into a Moroi by staking her with a silver stake infused with spirit. After recovering from the initial shock of being restored, Sonya leads them to Jillian Mastrano’s house in Michigan, who is revealed to be the illegitimate child of Eric Dragomir. Not long after they arrive, Guardians raid the Mastrano house, forcing them to scatter and flee again and creating the opportunity for Victor and Robert to kidnap Jill. Using her spirit abilities, Sonya is able to locate where the brothers are hiding Jill and relays the information onto Rose. Upon questioning, Sonya also reveals to Rose that her and Dimitri’s auras shine extraordinarily bright when they are around each other, which shows they are in love. This further confuses Rose about Dimitri's true feelings for her.

Back at Court, Lissa, Christian and Adrian try looking for Tatiana's murderer, and discover unsettling information about the Queen, her lover Ambrose and Adrian's own mother, Daniella. While at Court, Lissa is in the running for Queen, despite being ineligible as the result of being without a quorum. The process involves taking a series of tests to prove she is worthy of the throne, and after she passes, there is a huge debate among the Moroi about whether she can actually be Queen.

Rose, Dimitri, and Sonya quickly find Victor and Robert and fight them to get Jill back. Rose battles with Victor, and in a spirit-induced rage, she inadvertently kills him. She becomes distraught as the group heads to a hotel to recover. In one of the rooms, Dimitri attempts to comfort her and tells her not to blame herself. He admits he loves her and regrets losing her, but refuses to take another man’s girlfriend. Rose tells him she only belongs to herself, and she chooses Dimitri. Accepting that they were meant for each other, Rose and Dimitri make love. Rose makes the decision to break up with Adrian when she sees him in person and not in one of his spirit dreams. That evening, the four leave to meet up with Mikhail near Court; Adrian comes along and witnesses a kiss between Dimitri and Rose. More pressing matters are at hand as they head back to Court, Mikhail and Rose having just gotten information from Sydney and the Alchemists confirming who the killer is.

Back at Court and in front of the Council and assembled Moroi, Rose presents Jill as part of the Dragomir bloodline, arguing that this enables Lissa to become Queen. Then she reveals to everyone that Tasha is the one who killed the queen, as she hated Tatiana's policies about dhampirs and Moroi. Rose also silently notices that Tasha has longed for Dimitri the entire time, which is why Tasha framed Rose for the murder. As guardians attempt to take in Tasha, she grabs a gun and holds Mia hostage. Lissa hurries forward in an attempt to compel her to stop, but Tasha makes a rash decision, shooting at Lissa. Rose jumps in front of Lissa and takes the bullet in her chest. Her final glimpse is of Lissa and Dimitri standing over her as she blacks out. A few days later, she awakens in a palace room with Dimitri by her side. He joyfully tells her that they have both received full pardons and their guardian statuses again—she is one of Lissa’s guardians and he is Christian’s guardian. Both are finally able to be open about their relationship. When Lissa visits Rose, she realizes they are no longer bonded. They speculate that because Rose was at the brink of death and healed herself without the help of spirit, the bond was negated. Lissa also won the royal election, thanks to Jill being part of the Dragomir bloodline and making her eligible for the throne. Adrian visits Rose and confronts her on why their relationship failed; Adrian blames it on Rose's constant yearning for Dimitri but Rose tells him it’s both that and the fact that they are so different and he depends on her too much, saying that she is his anchor to life. Rose spends the remainder of her convalescence healing and being with Dimitri.

The series ends with Lissa’s coronation. As she is crowned the new queen, Lissa shares a humorous look with Rose in the crowd. Rose, embracing Dimitri and feeling happier than ever with his love and Lissa's triumph, tells him she thinks that the future will be good.

== Characters ==
- Rose Hathaway
- Lissa Dragomir
- Christian Ozera
- Adrian Ivashkov
- Sydney Sage
- Dimitri Belikov
- Tasha Ozera
- Janine Hathaway
- Abe Mazur
- Jill Mastrano/Jill Dragomir
- Mikhail Tanner
- Sonya Karp
- Robert Doru
- Victor Dashkov
- Daniella Ivashkov
- Eddie
- Emily Mastrano

== Book ban ==
In 2023, the book was banned, in Clay County District Schools, Florida.
