= Bloodlines (book series) =

Book series by Richelle Mead

Bloodlines series
- Bloodlines; The Golden Lily; The Indigo Spell; The Fiery Heart; Silver Shadows; The Ruby Circle
- Author: Richelle Mead
- Country: United States
- Language: English
- Genre: Young adult Urban fantasy Dark fantasy Paranormal romance
- Publisher: Razorbill
- Published in English: 2011–2015
- No. of books: 6
- Preceded by: Vampire Academy series
- Website: Bloodlines.htm

Bloodlines is a book series by Richelle Mead. It is a spin-off of Mead's Vampire Academy series. The books follow alchemist Sydney Sage. After the incident with Rose and Dimitri, Sydney is being closely watched by the Alchemists (humans who help keep the vampire world a secret). They reluctantly entrusted her to be the main part in a cover-up plan to keep Princess Jillian Dragomir (Queen Vasilisa's recently found little sister) safe from the Moroi rebels who want to undermine the Queen's rule by assassinating her little sister.

== Books ==
- Bloodlines (August 23, 2011)
- The Golden Lily (June 12, 2012)
- The Indigo Spell (February 12, 2013)
- The Fiery Heart (November 19, 2013)
- Silver Shadows (July 29, 2014)
- The Ruby Circle (February 10, 2015)

== Characters ==
- Sydney Sage - Narrator of the series, alchemist and later a witch. The love interest and, as of Silver Shadows, wife of Moroi Adrian Ivashkov. Sage is portrayed by the Australian actress Daisy Masterman in the Bloodlines (series) book trailers produced by Penguin Books Australia.
- Adrian Ivashkov - Moroi, co-narrator from The Fiery Heart onwards. Adrian is a spirit user, and the love interest and husband, from Silver Shadows onwards, of human Sydney Sage. He is spirit-bound and has a psychic link with moroi princess Jillian Mastrano Dragomir.
- Jillian "Jill" Mastrano Dragomir - Moroi Princess and the younger half-sister of Vasilisa "Lissa" Dragomir. Jill is shadow-kissed and bonded psychically to Adrian Ivashkov, who saved her life using his abilities with spirit. She is also the love interest of Dhampir Eddie Castile.
- Eddie Castile - A Dhampir and the guardian of Moroi Princess, Jillian Mastrano Dragomir. They fall in love and begin dating towards the end of the series.
- Jacqueline "Jackie" Terwilliger - History teacher at Amberwood Prep. She is a member of the Stelle Witch Coven, and the mentor of Sydney Sage.
- Dimitri Belikov - A Dhampir and the Guardian of Lord Christian Ozera. He is the boyfriend of Dhampir guardian Rose Hathaway. Dimitri is an ex-strigoi who was turned back into a Dhampir by Lissa in the Vampire Academy Series.
- Sonya Karp - A Spirit user Moroi, formerly a Strigoi but turned back to Moroi in Last Sacrifice. She is the wife of Mikhail Tanner.
- Lee Donahue - An Air user Moroi. The son of Clarence Donahue and the cousin of deceased Tamara Donahue. He was a Strigoi but was turned back into a Moroi. He died in Bloodines when he wanted to change back into a Strigoi and also change Jillian.
- Keith Darnell - An Alchemist who raped Sydney's older sister, Carly. Because of this, Abe Mazur saw to it that he lost an eye, as a favor to Sydney. Keith was sent to Re-Education when he was found to be selling vampire blood into tattoo business, Nevermore.
- Angeline Dawes - a Dhampir and Novice. She was brought from the Keepers to help protect Jill from danger. She is the love interest of human Trey Juarez.
- Zoe Sage - A human and a junior Alchemist. Zoe is the younger sister of Sydney; she now attends Amberwood Prep with the others.
- Marcus Finch - A human and ex-Alchemist, who had been helping other Alchemist escape the fold. He was the one that broke Sydney's Golden Lily tattoo in The Indigo Spell.
- Rose Hathaway - A Dhampir and Guardian of Queen Vasilisa Dragomir. She is the girlfriend and lover of Dhampir Guardian Dimitri Belikov. She is the best friend of Queen Vasilisa Dragomir.
- Vasilisa Dragomir - The Queen of Moroi and best friends with her Guardian Rose Hathaway. Vasilisa is a Spirit user and the girlfriend and lover of Moroi Christian Ozera. She is the older half-sister of * Jillian Mastrano - Dragomir.
- Christian Ozera - A Fire user Moroi. He is the boyfriend and lover of Queen Vasilisa Dragomir.
- Trey Juarez - Is a human and former member of the Warriors of the Light, he was kicked out in The Golden Lily. He is the love interest of Dhampir Angeline Dawes.
- Neil Raymond - A Dhampir and Guardian of Princess Jillian Mastrano - Dragomir. He has a faint British accent. He gets involved with Olive in the fourth book.
- Alicia - A seemingly benign girl who is revealed to be an evil witch, who sucks out magic from other witches in order to gain power.
- Declan Neil Raymond - Olive Sinclair and Neil Raymond biological son. Sydney Sage and Adrian Ivashkov are his adopted parents. His true parents are a secret because they were both dhampirs.

== Reception ==
Critical reception for the series has been positive, with The Golden Lily receiving a positive review from RT Book Reviews.
