= The Indigo Spell =

2013 novel by Richelle Mead

- First edition (publ. Razorbill); Cover artist:Michael Frost
- Author: Richelle Mead
- Language: English
- Publisher: Razorbill
- Publication date: 2013

The Indigo Spell is a 2013 fantasy novel written by the American author Richelle Mead. Released in February 2013, it is the third novel in Mead's book series Bloodlines. "The Indigo Spell" has 401 pages, making up the 25 chapters in the book. This book is preceded by "The Golden Lily" and is followed by "The Fiery Heart".

== Plot ==
The book starts with Sydney being woken by her history/magic teacher and asked a personal question. Ms Terwiliger then drags her out to the middle of the desert so she can perform a spell, which she can't do herself because it has to be done by a virgin. Sydney is still resistant to learning magic but does the spell anyway. Her teacher is worried by Sydney's findings, as it means her older sister is nearby, and she uses an evil spell to suck the youth and power out of teen girls, which means Sydney may be in danger. Ms Terwiliger tells Sydney that she has to develop her magical skills quickly, whether she wants to or not.

Sydney is invited to Sonya and Mikhail's wedding, as are the other two Alchemists that were on house arrest with her after the escapade with Rose. This is because the Moroi are trying to make amends to them. She is supposed to be flying separately from Adrian so people don't find out they are in the same place but, due to an overbooked plane, Sydney gets switched to Adrian's flight. She tells him he can't love her, but he says he is going to keep doing so whether she loves him back or not, and he is convinced she is in love with him and just doesn't know it yet. Changing the subject, Sydney ends up telling him about Ms Terwiliger and the desert spell, and the fact that she is supposed to find one neighbourhood in L.A. At the wedding, Sydney is shocked by the strength of Ian's revulsion to the Moroi, who doesn't even want to shake hands with any Moroi. Sydney is the put on the spot when Adrian asks her to dance in a show of fostering good relations. She accepts, and Sonya and Rose comment on how good they look together, troubling Sydney. Later in the evening, she goes outside in the moonlight with Adrian to do the spell again, this time to try to find Marcus Finch, and she sees a building in Santa Barbara.

Back in Palm Springs, Sydney has to fix Angeline's math problem by finding her a tutor, and eventually, Trey agrees to do it, but little does she know, that leads to Angeline cheating on Eddie with Trey. Sydney's problems mount as Ms Terwiliger wants her and Adrian to go and warn potential victims of her sister (in disguise of course). That leads to romantic interludes, including one that leaves her with a hickey. Sydney keeps telling herself to forget about them and is in complete denial of her feelings for Adrian.

She finally finds Marcus, but not before ending up in a fight with him. She sees a girl who was with the Warriors with Marcus and learns that she is a double agent. She discovers that Marcus finds Alchemists and Warriors that want to leave their groups, and helps them. He also says that he can break the group compulsion in the Alchemist tattoos, but that she has to pull off a mission to collect evidence of Alchemists and Warriors working together first. She uses Ian's crush on her to get access to an Alchemist facility and, using magic, collects the information she needs. She then agrees to the process of breaking her tattoo, but almost gets herself into a trap by questioning her superior. She has to cover her tracks, but her quick thinking has unforeseen consequences.

Adrian goes with Sydney to the bed-and-breakfast Veronica was staying at and explains to her why he knows she's in love with him. He says it's because of what her aura does when he touches her, and he's about to kiss her when the receptionist comes in, causing Sydney to pull away and her cross necklace to come off, and her other necklace, which protects her, to slip.

The Angeline and Trey situation is discovered and Eddie is hurt. Marcus takes his recruits to Mexico to 'seal' their tattoos with special indigo ink. Sydney refuses to go with them, preferring to work from the inside, which the ex-Alchemists warn her against. Ms. Terwiliger's sister Veronica turns up in the coma that is the trademark aftermath of her spell. The receptionist, Alicia, is revealed to be using it after Sydney's car explodes into foam. She finds her cross inside it, which is why she went after one of Jackie's coven sisters: she doesn't need the youth, just the power.

After going to Jackie's house with Adrian, worried when she didn't answer her phone, Sydney has to engage in a magical showdown with Alicia, accidentally sets the house on fire, and they just barely manage to escape. Jackie's thirteen cats then lead them to her.

Sydney eventually decides to go to Mexico with Marcus to get her tattoo sealed, and finds it hard to say goodbye to everyone, especially Adrian, who leaves her a letter. Before she gets on the train to Mexico, she changes her mind and realizes she loves Adrian and doesn't want to leave him. This is based on Jill's advice and a story from her and Adrian's old self-defense teacher, who told it to her when she went to return the gun she borrowed from him. She follows the latitude and longitude directions Adrian left her, and finds him at a museum of Roman antiquities. She professes her love for him and tells hims she's staying and that they will date in secret.

When she gets back to the school, she finds her little sister, Zoe, waiting for her in her room, with a golden lily on her cheek. This is Stanton's answer to her plea for more help and protection, along with another Dhampir.
