= Spirit Bound =

2010 novel by Richelle Mead

- Cover of Spirit Bound
- Author: Richelle Mead
- Language: English
- Series: Vampire Academy
- Genre: Young adult, Urban fantasy, Dark fantasy, Paranormal romance
- Publisher: Razorbill
- Publication date: May 18, 2010
- Publication place: United States
- Media type: Print (Hardcover, Softcover, Large-print), e-Book (Kindle, Nook)
- Pages: 489
- ISBN: 978-1-59514-250-4
- OCLC: 739437472
- LC Class: PZ7.M478897 Sp 2010
- Preceded by: Blood Promise
- Followed by: Last Sacrifice

Spirit Bound is the fifth book in the Vampire Academy series by Richelle Mead.

In its opening week, Spirit Bound debuted at #1 on The Wall Street Journal's hardcover fiction list and #1 on the USA Today bestseller list, which covers all books of all genres together in one list. Its release also pushed the Vampire Academy series into the #1 slot on the New York Times list for children's series.

After a long and taxing journey to Dimitri's birthplace in Siberia, Rose Hathaway has finally returned to St. Vladimir's and has been reentered student life. However, Dimitri has survived against all odds and now seeks Rose's death. She believes that there may be one way to change him back, but she may have to put everything at risk to find out.

== Plot ==
The book starts off with Rose reading the last in a series of love letters/death threats from Dimitri. The final exams are set to start in a short time and she resolves to stay focused and pass them to the best of her abilities and hope it will be enough for her to get assigned to Lissa. The teachers test her by having her trapped on a swinging bridge with Strigoi approaching on both sides, which she passes by cutting the bridge, then "killing" the opponents on her end.

After Abe's network relayed a message from Victor Dashkov that there was nothing he could be bribed with while he was behind bars, Rose plots with Lissa and Eddie to break him out of his high-security vampire prison. They successfully do so by disguising themselves as guardians bringing new feeders and relying heavily on Lissa's compulsion abilities. Victor agrees to lead them to his brother, Robert, a reclusive spirit user who is rumored to have once returned a Strigoi to their original state.

They travel to Las Vegas, where Adrian tracks Rose's credit cards and follows them. While not very pleased with Rose's continued endeavors to help Dimitri, he stays with them. Robert tells them that the Spirit user must infuse a stake with Spirit and kill the Strigoi on its own, but escapes when they are attacked by Dimitri and other Strigoi. They manage to escape and upon their arrival at court Eddie and Rose are punished for endangering the Moroi and sent to do physical labor. While they are occupied, Lissa and Christian are kidnapped by Dimitri as bait for Rose.

Deciding to kill him for good and eliminate a threat to Lissa, Rose leads a group of guardians to his hiding place. She fights her way over to him and is about to kill him when Christian encircles him in a ring of fire, effectively cutting all movement while Lissa stakes him. Dimitri is restored as a Dhampir and taken into custody. Traumatized and crushed by guilt, he pushes Rose away and tries to avoid her as much as possible saying that he cannot forgive himself for what he did to her. Soon a discussion takes place in the court regarding the age law - i.e that dhampirs have to graduate at the age of 16 not 18 because of the low number of dhampirs. Since there are only 11 royal Moroi families Tatiana give her vote for the age law. Rose bursts up at this and tells that Lissa can be a part of council since she is 18 years old. But as per the law, there needs to be another family member other than the council member for Lissa to get her quorum. Then disturbed, Rose turns to Adrian for comfort.

The next morning at breakfast, Rose and Dimitri run into each other. Dimitri sees the bite marks and knows who they come from, he knew Rose was going to move on. In the middle of the discussion, a group of Guardians surround Rose and Dimitri instinctively fights to protect her, but she calms him down. The Guardians announce that Queen Tatiana has been found murdered with Rose's stake and as such she is to come with them. At the ensuing hearing, it is decided that Rose must face an official hearing. If she is guilty, she will be sentenced to death. During the trial, Abe turns up and wants to be her lawyer. On the way to wait for the impending trial, Ambrose delivers a note to her from Tatiana saying that Lissa needs to have her voice heard in the Council and that there is a second living Dragomir, necessary for Lissa to have her quorum.

== Characters ==
- Rose Hathaway – The protagonist of the story who has a one-sided bond with the Dragomir princess, Lissa. At the end of the book, she is found guilty of the murder of Queen Tatiana and is sentenced to death. She is given a note from Queen Tatiana from Ambrose and discovers there's a second Dragomir.
- Lissa Dragomir- Rose's best friend and the last Dragomir who has a rare element known as Spirit and can heal wounds. She is willing to help Rose by saving Dimitri. In the end, she gets back together with Christian. She may have another relative who can fulfill Lissa's quorum.
- Eddie Castile – A dhampir and friend of Rose. He has a strong sense of humor, but is also serious about his guardian duties, due to him being kidnapped by a pack of Strigoi in Frostbite. The Strigoi drank his blood so much that he was at the brink of death when Rose and Christian went to rescue the victims.
- Adrian Ivashkov – Great nephew to Queen Tatiana and Rose's boyfriend during Spirit Bound. He is also a Spirit user who can "walk" into dreams. He and Rose have trouble with their relationship when Dimitri returns. Near the end, they make up before Rose is accused of his great aunt's murder.
- Christian Ozera – Lissa's boyfriend and friend of Rose. His parents went Strigoi willingly, because of that, he's an outcast. His element is fire. He is known to be very sarcastic and quick-witted, especially when he is upset and doesn't want to reveal his true feelings.
- Victor Dashkov – Lissa's "uncle" who used her Spirit ability to cure himself of his illness. He escaped from Rose and others with his brother, Robert. It is unknown what his fate is.
- Dimitri Belikov – Rose's former instructor and love interest. He is very grateful to Lissa for saving him from his Strigoi state but claims he can no longer love Rose.
- Queen Tatiana – Ruler of the Moroi and dhampir world and great aunt to Adrian Ivashkov. She shows some respect to Rose and other dhampirs. Near the end she is murdered.
- Robert Doru – Victor Dashkov's brother and a spirit user who claims to have brought a Strigoi back to their original state
