= Blood Promise (novel) =

2009 novel by Richelle Mead

- Cover of Blood Promise
- Author: Richelle Mead
- Cover artist: Emilian Gregory
- Language: English
- Series: Vampire Academy
- Genre: Young adult, Urban Fantasy, Dark fantasy, Paranormal romance
- Publisher: Razorbill
- Publication date: August 25, 2009
- Publication place: United States
- Media type: Print (Hardcover, Softcover, Large-print), e-Book (Kindle, Nook)
- Pages: 503
- ISBN: 978-1-59514-198-9
- OCLC: 739437472
- LC Class: PZ7.M478897 Bl 2009
- Preceded by: Shadow Kiss
- Followed by: Spirit Bound

Blood Promise is the fourth book in the Vampire Academy series by Richelle Mead. Previously in the series, the main character, Rose, and her true love Dimitri made a pact that if either of them were turned into strigoi, the other would kill them rather than let them roam as an evil vampire. Blood Promise follows Rose's emotional struggle as she travels to Russia to hunt down Dimitri and fulfill this promise.

Blood Promise's opening week sales put the Vampire Academy series on the New York Times list for children's series, making its best rank to date at #2, just behind the dominant Twilight series.

== Plot ==
In Blood Promise, Rose leaves St. Vladimir's Academy to go after Dimitri, who has become Strigoi, and kill him. The only clue she has is that he might be somewhere in Siberia. After meeting an Alchemist named Sydney, they travel to Siberia, where she eventually finds Dimitri’s family in the small town of Baia. While in Baia, she meets another "Shadow-Kissed" bonded pair, Oksana and Mark, and a mysterious Moroi man named Abe, who tries to force her to go back to St. Vladimir's. He eventually coerces her into leaving, and Rose agrees after a falling out with Dimitri's sister Viktoria. She then travels to Novosibirsk with other unpromised guardians to stake out Strigoi in the hopes of finding Dimitri. When she does meet him, she is too stunned by his Strigoi appearance to attempt to kill him, and ends up being held hostage by him. He refuses to kill her, and instead, says he will keep her until she decides to turn Strigoi by her own will to be with him.

All the while, Rose keeps checking up with Lissa back at St. Vladimir's through the bond. Avery Lazar, a secret Spirit user, has been using compulsion to control Lissa. During a visit to Lissa's head, Rose gets pushed out by Avery. While held hostage by Dimitri, who has been feeding off her and thus weakening her, Rose eventually manages to escape, grabbing a stake on the way out. Dimitri catches up with her, and they eventually battle on a bridge, where Rose manages to plunge her stake into his chest.

Exhausted, Rose ends up at the home of an Alchemist friend of Sydney's, where Oksana, Mark, and Abe are waiting. When she wakes up, she realizes Lissa is in danger with Avery, who wants to kill Lissa and then heal her back so that Lissa would be "shadow-kissed" and bonded to Avery. With help from Oksana, Rose manages to guide Lissa and Adrian through the fight against Avery and her brother, Reed, and Avery's guardian Simon. After saving Lissa, Rose asks Oksana and Mark whether there is a way a Strigoi can be restored to their former selves. Reluctantly, they tell her of a Spirit user they knew named Robert Doru, who claimed to have restored a Strigoi back to life. However, only Victor Dashkov, his half-brother, would have any idea where he currently was. Realizing the situation was hopeless because she already staked Dimitri, Rose goes back to St. Vladimir's Academy.

Back at St. Vladimir's, Rose reunites with Lissa and shares what happened to her in Russia. Rose's mother, Janine, is also there, and reveals to Rose that Abe is actually her father. After agreeing to re-enroll in school to graduate, Rose goes back to her normal life at St. Vladmir's. However, she soon receives a package from Russia, enclosed with the stake she used on Dimitri, and a note from him saying he was not really staked properly, and was still alive, waiting for Rose to finish school to find him. Rose realizes that with Dimitri still a Strigoi, she has a chance to restore him to his former life, but only by finding Robert Doru.

== See also ==
- Vampire Academy
- Richelle Mead
