= The Fiery Heart =

2013 novel by Richelle Mead

- First edition
- Author: Richelle Mead
- Language: English
- Series: Bloodlines
- Genre: Young adult Urban fantasy Paranormal romance
- Publisher: Razorbill
- Publication date: November 19, 2013
- Publication place: United States
- Media type: Print (Hardcover)
- Pages: 420
- ISBN: 978-1-59514-320-4
- Preceded by: The Indigo Spell
- Followed by: Silver Shadows

The Fiery Heart is the fourth book in Richelle Mead's Bloodlines series and was released on November 19, 2013. It is told from both Adrian's and Sydney's perspectives. As from the start of the series, Sydney Sage is an Alchemist who been assigned to protect the Moroi princess, Jillian Mastrano Dragomir, from the assassins who would like to overthrow Vasilisa (Lissa) Dragomir, the Queen of the Moroi, from her throne.

== Plot ==
The novel begins where The Indigo Spell left off, when Alchemist Sydney Sage proclaimed her love to the Moroi Adrian Ivashkov. That starts their taboo relationship just as Sydney's younger sister Zoe is introduced as an Alchemist tasked to both watch over Sydney and learn from her. The Fiery Heart is told in alternating chapters, between Adrian's perspective and Sydney's. Sydney begins to accept her path in defying the Alchemists by being initiated in Jacklyn Terwilliger's coven of witches, which is named The Stelle. Sydney finds out from one of the witches that the oldest witch in their region, Inez, has had a history with personally fighting Strigoi. Inez claims it was because her blood tasted bad to them. Sydney has been having the same issue, and is immediately curious. She asks her mentor Jackie to take her to meet Inez. Things are further complicated when Sydney receives a call from her father, notifying her of his impending divorce and his expectation that Sydney will testify against her mother in order to win custody over the underage Zoe, and thus ensure that she will stay on the path to becoming an Alchemist.

Adrian continues to struggle with a balance in his use of Spirit, with the ever-looming threat of darkness that envelops him if he uses too much. Previously turning to alcohol and cigarettes to mute Spirit's effects, he and Sydney have made a pact to cut down on their vices (hers being caffeine addiction) in order to try live a healthier lifestyle. An incident with one of Adrian's fellow college artist friends, a student named Rowena, causes a block of concrete to fall on her hand while she is constructing a sculpture. This leads Adrian to impulsively heal her hand, worried that a broken hand would ruin her future career as an artist. After Adrian begins to crash from the high of Spirit magic, he begins to hallucinate hearing the voice of his dead aunt Tatiana, and consequently begins to heavily drink again. Sydney finds him in a disheveled state, and suggests that Adrian begin taking anti-depressants in order to cut him off from Spirit and thus the darkness. Adrian argues that he is not able to cut himself off of Spirit, for fear that those he cares about might need his help.

Zoe begins to grow suspicious of Sydney as she continues to be absent with the excuse for doing work for Ms. Terwilliger. Zoe tells Sydney her constant involvement with the teacher is unnecessary, as is being too friendly with the Moroi and Dhampirs. Sydney retaliates by saying that being involved is necessary for their mission and for their cover. Sydney, Jackie, and Adrian then travel together to see the witch Inez. Inez is at first a little sarcastic and bitter, but eventually warms up to Sydney when she sees how committed she is after making her change her flat tire, and that she has already been initiated into a coven. Inez reveals that the reason Strigoi were not able to drink from Sydney was because she had been using magic, and had thus tainted her blood. Sydney soon learns that magic is bound to the Moroi blood, but that witches have to draw their magic from the Earth. This leads her to get the idea of replicating the tattoo that her friend and ex-Alchemist Marcus Finch created in order to break the magic in the Golden Lily tattoo that all Alchemists possess.

Lissa contacts Adrian and assigns him to inspect a new Strigoi restoration in the hope of being able to discover why those who have been restored are no longer able to turn Strigoi again. Adrian meets the newly restored Dhampir Olive, and senses that there is Spirit magic still lingering in her blood. Spirit continues to leak out of the blood after it is taken from Olive, and Adrian, with the help of Spirit user Nina Sinclair, charms several silver rings to contain it long enough to be sent back to the Royal Court and be properly inspected. Invigorated with his achievement and high on Spirit's power, Adrian attempts to celebrate by surprising Sydney by preparing crème brulée for her, but he begins to crash from his high when he realizes he doesn't have enough money to buy the necessary ingredients. He begins to hear the voice of his late aunt Tatiana again, who encourages him to sell the cuff-links she had once bought him for his birthday. Adrian compromises with pawning one of the rubies that embellished the cuff-links for $200. Sydney cancels their date, leading Adrian to spiral into darkness as Tatiana continues to haunt him, leading him to spend all the money on a drinking binge.

Jill, sensing Adrian's distress, wakes Sydney up and convinces her to help him. Sydney is disappointed in Adrian, and after talking to Rowena, finds him yelling outside the pawnshop for the ruby. Sydney pays the money Adrian owes and breaks down in front of him once she drives him home, telling him she is scared of how far Spirit's darkness might take him over. Jill eventually convinces Adrian to try taking the pills, pointing out that it's not a life-long commitment. Adrian visits a therapist, who diagnoses him with bi-polar disorder and prescribes him mood stabilizers.

Zoe and Sydney meet their father, who has come into town to discuss the details of the divorce. He gives them both folders with photos and information for them to study, wanting them to testify against their mother and make her appear to be an unfit parent. He then updates Sydney on the details of Keith's re-education, and video-calls him to show Sydney the full effect it has had on him. Sydney, frightened that Keith has turned into a lifeless husk of himself, takes the initiative in re-creating Marcus's ink. She tests the tattoo on Trey without having a way to find out whether or not it truly worked, because she does not have access to the golden ink.

Adrian, Sydney and Neil are summoned to Court in order to help with the blood sample, and in the hope that Sydney would be able to create a binding tattoo with Olive's blood. Sydney compiles a list for Abe Mazur to acquire the necessary ingredients, and requests that he get her double the amount in case she were to make a mistake. While waiting, Adrian and Sydney take the opportunity away from Alchemist eyes to spend time together as a couple touring the Moroi Court. The run into some of Adrian's old partying friends while at a diner, who tell Adrian that they would like to "dabble" with Sydney, as she has never had her blood drunk before. Outraged, Adrian orders them to leave. This disappoints his friends, saying Adrian never used to mind before. Sydney overhears the conversation, and Rose reveals to her that "dabble" is the blood equivalent to date rape.

Sydney is disgusted and angered with Adrian, because he used to willingly take part in something similar. After finishing the ink mixture for the blood, Sydney is confronted by Abe, who catches on to the fact that she wanted double the ingredients and senses she needed it for her own purposes. Abe agrees to use Earth magic to charm the vials of Moroi blood in the mix of tattoo ingredients, and promises he won't tell anyone.

Adrian is confronted about his lack of Spirit use when he didn't help the other Spirit users contain the magic in Olive's blood as they were tattooing Neil. He then reveals that he is unable to access his magic due to mood stabilizers. Sydney forgives him after understanding that he is trying to change and that they are now both different people from the past. After walking toward her hotel room, Sydney is attacked by Adrian's old friends, who attempt to drink her blood. She uses some of her magic to startle them and run off. Adrian comes to her rescue, hitting one of the guys with a tree branch. Lissa attempts damage control of the incident by making Adrian, Sydney, and Neil leave Court as soon as possible, anticipating backlash from the Alchemists.

On the drive to the airport, they get caught in a blizzard and Sydney crashes the car into a tree. While waiting for a tow truck, Sydney creates a ball of fire to keep them warm despite the fact that Neil has no knowledge of Sydney's abilities. They stay at an inn while their car is being repaired, and Sydney and Adrian make love for the first time.

Neil confronts Sydney, telling her he would keep her secret but he needs her help to track down a Strigoi in order to truly find out if the tattoo worked. He assures her it is safe by recruiting Eddie for their mission. Angeline begins to grow suspicious of the three talking in secret, and asks Adrian's help to find out what's going on. He dismisses her and says not to worry. He plans Sydney's birthday celebration, leading to Adrian and Sydney making love once again in her car. Zoe later finds Adrian's cellphone in the car, revealing his relationship with Sydney.

Sydney, Eddie, and Neil successfully track down the Strigoi. However, they had underestimated him, previously believing he was a young and inexperienced Strigoi. The Strigoi is unable to drink from Neil, revealing the tattoo worked. Eddie is able to finally kill the Strigoi when Angeline, Trey, and Jill show up to help them.

Marcus contacts Adrian, setting up a time for them to exchange Sydney's replicated ink. Adrian decides to set the meet up at Ms. Terwiliger's house, as it was unlikely to be monitored by the Alchemists. As they grow concerned when Sydney fails to show up to the exchange on time, Eddie drives up to them and reveals that Sydney has been captured by the Alchemists.

Ms. Tewilliger is unable to scry for Sydney. Adrian is frustrated that he doesn't have the use of his magic to allow him to Spirit dream to find her. The novel ends to Sydney being sensory deprived and subjected to Alchemist mind games as she begins re-education.

== Characters ==
=== Main ===
1. Sydney Sage - The protagonist of the series. Sydney is an Alchemist and witch, she is highly intelligent and has a natural ability for magic. Initially repulsed with all things unnatural as was taught by the Alchemist, Sydney begins warming up to Dhampirs and Moroi after spending time and helping Rose Hathaway and eventually begins a taboo relationship with Adrian Ivashkov.
2. Adrian Ivashkov - A Moroi royal in the Ivashkov line, Adrian is charismatic and charming, having a reputation as womanizer and almost always associated with alcohol and smoking. Adrian cleans up his act as he feels he is not worthy of Sydney. Adrian is one of the rare few Spirit users and has a psychic bond with Jill Mastrano after he brought her back to life prior to the series beginning.
3. Jillian Mastrano-Dragomir - A Moroi princess and half sister to Queen Vasilisa Dragomir. Due to certain Moroi laws, Lissa is only able to hold onto her throne if she has one other living relative, those who wish to overthrow Lissa have attempted to assassinate Jill, with one succeeding until Adrian brought her back to life. Jill is shadow-kissed, and is able to see and hear everything Adrian experiences, leading to complications in Sydney and Adrians relationship.
4. Eddie Castile - Dhampir and Guardian of Jill Mastrano, Eddie is a long time friend of Rose Hathaway. Eddie has feelings for Jill, but does not deem himself worthy of a princess.
5. Angeline Dawes - A Dhampir from 'The Keepers', a mixed group of Moroi, Dhampirs and Humans who live in a mountain in West Virginia, is assigned to help protect Jill Mastrano. She is from a place where humans, Moroi and Dhampirs all coexist with one another and is often scrutinized for being somewhat uncivilized. Angeline is hot-headed and learning the ways of the world away from her village, often leading her to cause trouble. She's described as strong, blunt, lethal and smart despite her upbringing and young age.
6. Trey Juarez - A human and former member of the Warriors of Light, a group of humans who hunt vampires. He is good friends with Sydney and works at the local coffee shop Spencer's. At first, Trey struggles against the beliefs of his group, but when the Warriors cut him and his dad off, he starts spending more time with Sydney and against all logic falls in love with Angeline. He finally realizes he was wrong and his new Moroi and Dhampir friends were never the enemy.

=== Secondary characters ===
1. Jaclyn Terwilliger - A history teacher and witch at Amberwood Prep. She is Sydney's mentor in witchcraft and is quick to help Sydney when she needs her on her personal missions without question.
2. Malachi Wolfe - Sydney and Adrian's old self-defense instructor. He often tells extravagant and impossible tales of bravery he has achieved. He begins a relationship with Jacyln Tewilliger.
3. Marcus Finch - An ex-Alchemist identified by an indigo lily tattooed on his face. He is helping those who have seen the deceit and oppressive views of the Alchemists. He helps those wanting to quit by breaking their Golden Lily tattoos and building a rebellion.
4. Neil - The newest Dhampir Guardian to assigned to protect Jill, he is described as having a British accent and being very uptight and overly dedicated to his job. Neil respects Eddie as a Guardian but also feels a sense of rivalry with him.
5. Jared Sage - Sydney and Zoe's strict father. He is no nonsense and very cold and critical toward his daughters and those around him.
6. Rosemarie Hathaway - Dhampir Guardian and best friend to Queen Vasilisa Dragomir. Rose was the one who broke the initial boundaries of Sydney's fear of vampires by asking for her help after she was framed for the murder of the late Queen Tatiana. She is in a romantic relationship with Dimitri Belikov.
7. Dimitri Belikov - Dhampir Guardian to Lissa's boyfriend Christian Ozera. He is a former instructor and teacher of Rose whilst she was at St. Vladamir's Academy. He was turned Strigoi but was restored by Lissa. He is in a romantic relationship with Rose Hathaway.
8. Zoe Sage - An Alchemist and Sydney's younger sister. Zoe has an intense need for her father's approval and is more gullible and susceptible to the Alchemist's way of thinking. Sydney does not wish Zoe to be an Alchemist and wishes Zoe was free from her father's influence.
9. Sonya Karp - A Moroi and ex-teacher at St. Vladamir's Academy. She is one of the rare Spirit users and one who succumbed to the darkness of Spirit, leading her to turn herself Strigoi. She was restored by Robert Doru and is married to Mikhail Tanner.
10. Vasilisa Dragomir - Called Lissa by her friends is the Moroi Queen, best friend to Rose and half sister to Jill Mastrano. Lissa is a Spirit user who restored Dimitri from his Strigoi form.
11. Inez Garcia - A powerful and old witch. She holds vital information for Sydney to uncover a way of replicating ink that would break the Alchemists Golden Lily tattoo.
