= Silver Shadows =

2014 novel by Richelle Mead

- Author: Richelle Mead
- Language: English
- Series: Bloodlines
- Genre: Young adult Urban fantasy Paranormal romance
- Publisher: Razorbill
- Publication date: 29 July 2014
- Publication place: United States
- Media type: Print, E-book
- ISBN: 978-1-59514-321-1
- Preceded by: The Fiery Heart
- Followed by: The Ruby Circle

Silver Shadows is the fifth book in the Bloodlines series by Richelle Mead. It is told from two perspectives.

== Plot ==
The novel starts with Sydney Sage in re-education, still in her dark cell, called reflection time by the Alchemists. She is still resisting their mind games, holding onto Adrian's love for her, until they start talking about letting her see her family if she admits she has been corrupted, making her think that if she's out of reflection, she might be able to see Adrian in a dream.

Meanwhile, Adrian is still searching for her in his dreams, but sporadically, and is losing heart because he never connects, so he turns to drinking again. Jill tells his mother where he is. Since she's out of prison, she comes and takes him to the Moroi Court, where he meets Nina Sinclair again. He takes her under his wing, oblivious to the fact that she's in love with him. While at Court, Adrian discovers that his parents don't love each other, and that his mother is staying with his father for the money and status, which disgusts him.

Back in the secret Alchemist facility, Sydney tells the Alchemists that she is ready to 'purge the darkness' so she can get out of the dark cell, and then she is taken to re-education, where she meets other Alchemists who have all been there for varying amounts of time. They are all told about her relationship with a Moroi, and as a result, nobody speaks to her. They even go so far as to move as far away from her as possible. She thinks that she will be able to have a normal sleep, meaning that Adrian will be able to reach her, but when she wakes up in the morning, she realises that the Alchemists are still drugging them somehow. She quickly makes a friend who has been there over a year, and he provides her with snippets of information, while being careful not to get noticed.

Adrian is taking Nina to various parties at Court, and after a visit to Sonya, in which he demands that Nina get compensation for her time and help with the research for the Spirit vaccine, Nina kisses him in his room. He pushes her away, but then she talks about how no one understands each other like they do because they are both Spirit users. He responds to her kiss, but then he thinks of Sydney and rejects Nina, trying to let her down gently. He then decides to go back to Palm Springs.

Sydney makes the mistake of defending the Moroi and speaking out in her first class, and so is then subjected to "purging," which means that she is given a drug that makes her nauseous but unable to vomit. Once under the drug's influence, she is shown images of happy Moroi. This "treatment" is designed to invoke the reaction and feeling of disgust and sickness when she sees Moroi. She realises that this needs repeat sessions to work.

Adrian finally realises he hasn't been trying Sydney when she would be asleep as he's been on a vampire schedule. He begins trying at night. Sydney succeeds at cutting off the flow of anti-Spirit gas to her room, thanks to some help from her roommate. After a few days, she finally gets a Spirit dream with Adrian. The Alchemists' techniques clearly aren't working, because all she wants to do is kiss him! She gets woken up too soon, but they have dreams on following nights. Sydney decides to start exploring at night, using magic, and information from her friends, to check out the facility and see if she can find an escape route. After seeing an apology to her sister from Keith, Sydney realises that she is being held at the same facility he was, which gives her 'rescuers' a lead.

Sydney gets hold of some salt and manages to magically charm it, trying to recreate her "Alchemist-proof" ink from the previous book, to give to one of the other young Alchemists before he gets re-inked. It works, so then other inmates want her to do the same for them.

Adrian talks to Marcus and Eddie and the rest of the Palm Springs gang, and they try to figure out where Sydney is so they can break her out. Adrian and Marcus talk to Carley and Keith, and realise that the facility is closer than anyone knew. Adrian grows increasingly worried when he loses the dream connection with Sydney again and assumes she has been caught, which turns out to be true. The Alchemists have figured out she was using magic, and trapped her in a torture chamber.

Adrian and the Dhampirs storm the facility and manage to get most of the inmates out, but realise Sydney is missing. So, Eddie and Adrian go to find her, and they get her and the only other occupant of the torture cells out as well. She happens to be Duncan's friend (a friend of Sydney on the re-education center )- Chantal who was missing for a year. They run, and Sydney and Adrian are meant to meet Marcus, but she wants to go off on their own as she says that if Sydney is with the other people, the alchemists might catch the others easily.

They are found by the Alchemists again and again.

Adrian has an idea of how Sydney would be granted aid from the Moroi Queen: by becoming his wife. They plan to have a Las Vegas wedding, but Adrian wants Sydney to have the best wedding she would want, with whatever dress, shoes, and accessories she wants, so he finds a venue that looks like one of her favourite places. To pay for all of it, he sells his Aunt Tatiana's cuff links, and makes the jewels into the wedding bands.

They then have to escape the Alchemists again. Jill has arranged a helicopter ride from a small Moroi school as their escape, but Sydney has to get past the Alchemists that were torturing her in the facility, and she uses magic to threaten them with fire. She hates hurting them, but there is nothing she wouldn't do for Adrian. They make it to Court, and everybody is shocked that Adrian married a human, but Lissa allows Sydney to stay and the Alchemists - including Sydney's father, sister, and Ian (who has a crush on her) - are removed from the premises. The book ends with the discovery that Jill is missing.

== Characters ==
- Sydney Sage - Narrator of the series. Alchemist and also a Witch. She falls in love with Adrian Ivashkov which makes the Alchemists send her to re-education. She later manages to escape and marries Adrian.
- Adrian Ivashkov - Moroi. Co-Narrator from The Fiery Heart onwards. Adrian is a Spirit user, and the love interest and husband from Silver Shadows onwards of human Sydney Sage. He has a psychic bond with Jillian Mastrano - Dragomir.
- Jillian "Jill" Mastrano Dragomir - Moroi Princess and the younger half-sister of Vasilisa Dragomir. Jill is "shadow-kissed" to the Spirit user Adrian Ivashkov, who saved her life. The love interest of Dhampir Eddie Castile.
- Sonya Karp - A Spirit user Moroi, she was a Strigoi but turned back in Last Sacrifice. She is married to Mikhail Tanner.
- Eddie Castile - A Dhampir and the Guardian of Moroi Princess, Jillian Mastrano- Dragomir. The love interest of Jillian Mastrano Dragomir.
- Marcus Finch - A human and ex-Alchemist, who had been helping other Alchemist escape the fold. He was the one that broke Sydney's Golden Lily tattoo in The Indigo Spell.
- Keith Darnell - An Alchemist and who had raped Sydney's older sister, Carley, because of this he lost an eye from Abe Mazur, because of a deal Abe made with Sydney. He was sent to Re-Education when found to be selling vampire blood into tattoo business and always fears being sent to Re-Education.
- Vasilisa 'Lissa' Sabina Rhea Dragomir - An eighteen-year-old Moroi Queen.
