= Richelle Mead =

American fantasy author (born 1976)

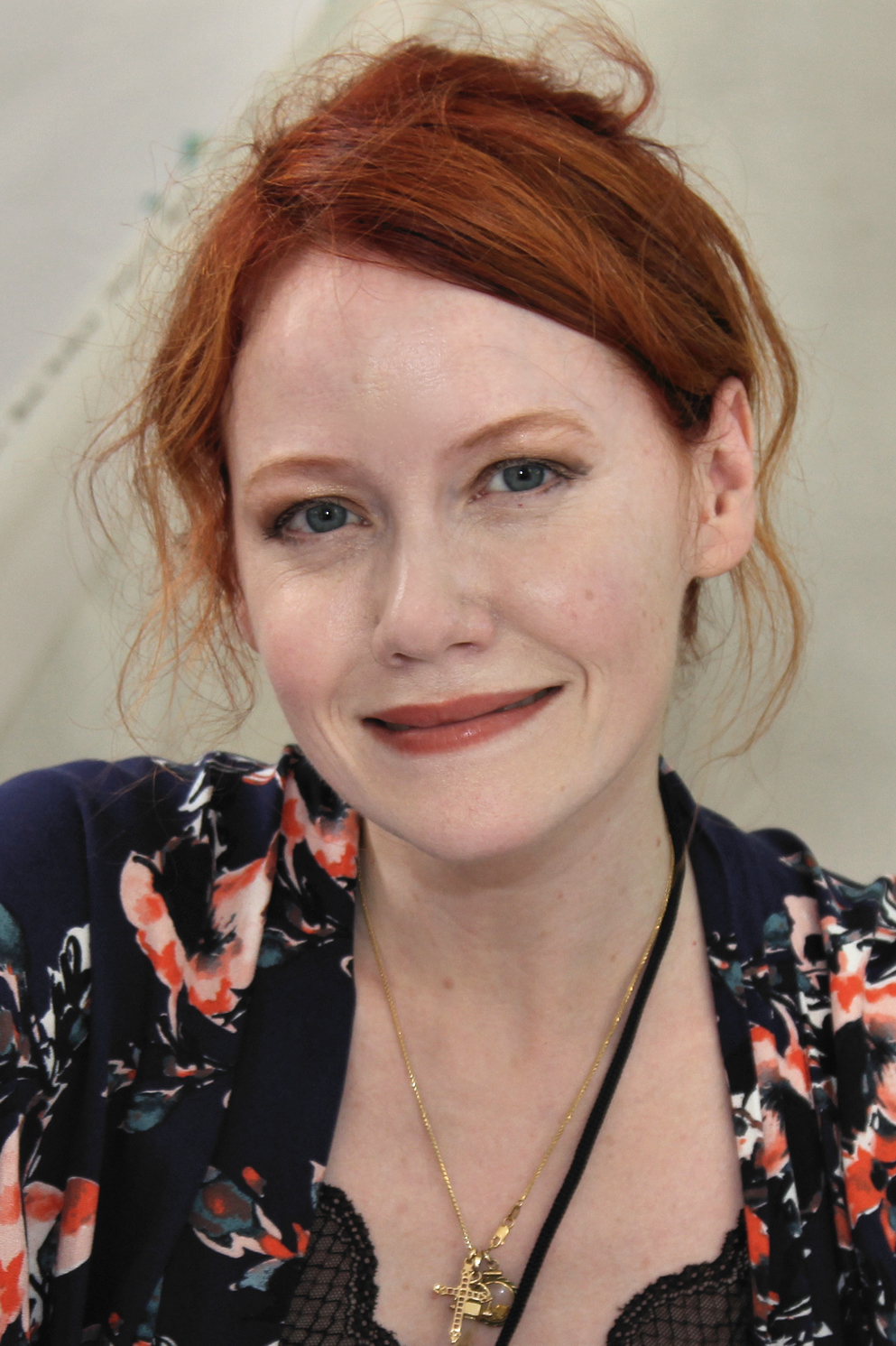
- Mead at the 2018 Texas Teen Book Festival
- Born: November 12, 1976 (age 49); Michigan, U.S.
- Education: University of Michigan Western Michigan University University of Washington
- Occupation: Author
- Children: 2 sons
- Writing career
- Period: 2007–present
- Genres: Fantasy, Young adult fiction
- Website: www.richellemead.com

Richelle Mead (born November 12, 1976) is an American fantasy author best known for Georgina Kincaid, Vampire Academy, Bloodlines and the Dark Swan.

== Education and career ==
Richelle Mead was born in Michigan, and currently lives in the Seattle suburb of Kirkland, Washington. She has three degrees: a Bachelor of General Studies from the University of Michigan, a Master of Comparative Religion from Western Michigan University, and a Master of Teaching from the University of Washington. Her teaching degree led her to become an 8th grade teacher in suburban Seattle, where she taught social studies and English. She continued writing in her free time, until she sold her first novel, Succubus Blues. After quitting her job to write full-time, her other books quickly followed.

== Awards and recognitions ==
- Honorable Mention - 2009 P.E.A.R.L. Awards - Best Romantic Fantasy - Thorn Queen
- Winner - 2010 Teen Read Awards - Best Teen Series - Vampire Academy series
- Winner - 2010 Goodreads Choice Awards - Goodreads Author - Richelle Mead
- Nominee - 2010 Goodreads Choice Awards - Paranormal Fantasy - Succubus Shadows
- Nominee - 2011 Kids' Choice Awards - Favorite Book - Vampire Academy series
- Winner - 2011 Goodreads Choice Awards - Best Graphic Novels and Comics - Vampire Academy
- Nominee - 2011 Goodreads Choice Awards - Favorite Book of 2011 - Bloodlines
- Nominee - 2011 Goodreads Choice Awards - Best Paranormal Fantasy - Succubus Revealed
- Nominee - 2011 Goodreads Choice Awards - Best Young Adult Fantasy and Science Fiction - Bloodlines
- Nominee - 2011 Goodreads Choice Awards - Best Goodreads Author
- Winner - 2013 Romantic Times Reviewers' Choice Best Book Awards - YA Protagonist - The Fiery Heart
- Nominee - 2013 Romantic Times Reviewers' Choice Best Book Awards - Futuristic Romance Gameboard of the Gods

== Bibliography ==
=== Novels ===
==== Georgina Kincaid series ====
1. Succubus Blues (February 27, 2007): Nominee - 2007 Reviewers' Choice Awards - Best Urban Fantasy Novel
2. Succubus on Top (December 18, 2007) (United Kingdom title: Succubus Nights)
3. Succubus Dreams (September 30, 2008)
4. Succubus Heat (May 26, 2009)
5. Succubus Shadows (March 30, 2010)
6. Succubus Revealed (August 30, 2011)

==== Dark Swan series ====
1. Storm Born (August 5, 2008): Nominee - 2008 Reviewers' Choice Awards - Best Urban Fantasy Novel
2. Thorn Queen (July 28, 2009)
3. Iron Crowned (February 22, 2011)
4. Shadow Heir (December 27, 2011)

==== Age of X Series ====
This series has been dropped by Richelle Mead's publisher and all further books in the series are unlikely to be released.

1. Gameboard of the Gods (June 4, 2013)
2. The Immortal Crown (May 29, 2014)
3. The Eye of Andromeda (not yet released)

=== Young adult novels ===
==== Vampire Academy series ====
1. Vampire Academy (August 16, 2007):Library Association: 2008 Quick Picks for Reluctant Young Adult Readers
2. Frostbite (April 10, 2008): Library Association: 2009 Quick Picks for Reluctant Young Adult Readers
3. Shadow Kiss (November 13, 2008)
4. Blood Promise (August 25, 2009)
5. Spirit Bound (May 18, 2010)*Nominee - 2011 Children's Choice Book Awards - Teen Choice Book of the Year
6. Last Sacrifice (December 7, 2010)

The first Vampire Academy book was adapted into a movie under the title Vampire Academy in 2014. Mead makes a non-speaking cameo appearances as a teacher in the film. The series was also loosely adapted into a television series in 2022 on Peacock.

==== Bloodlines series ====
Mead wrote a six-book spin-off series featuring characters from the Vampire Academy series: Sydney, Jill, Eddie, and Adrian. This spin-off series takes place in the same universe as Vampire Academy.

1. Bloodlines (August 23, 2011, ISBN 1-59514-317-3)
2. The Golden Lily (June 12, 2012, ISBN 1-59514-318-1)
3. The Indigo Spell (February 12, 2013)
4. The Fiery Heart (November 19, 2013)
5. Silver Shadows (July 29, 2014)
6. The Ruby Circle (February 10, 2015)

==== The Glittering Court series ====
1. The Glittering Court (April 5, 2016)
2. Midnight Jewel (June 27, 2017)
3. The Emerald Sea (June 26, 2018)

==== Standalone novels ====
Soundless (November 17, 2015)

=== Children's novels ===
- Doctor Who: Something Borrowed, the sixth Puffin E-short featuring the Sixth Doctor and Peri Brown (23 June 2013)

=== Anthologies ===
- “Brushstrokes”, Dreams & Desires Vol. 1 (Freya's Bower, February 2007) (featuring characters from the Georgina Kincaid series)
- “City of Demons”, Eternal Lover (Kensington, April 2008) (featuring characters from the Georgina Kincaid series)
- “Blue Moon”, Immortal: Love Stories With Bite (BenBella Books, August 2008)
- “Sunshine”, Kisses From Hell (HarperTeen, August 2010) (featuring characters from the Vampire Academy series)
- "Homecoming", Foretold (August 2012) (featuring characters from Vampire Academy series)
