= Cawthra Park Secondary School =

High school in Mississauga, Canada

Location
- 1305 Cawthra Road; Mississauga, Ontario, L5G 666; Canada; 43.576081°N 79.573497°W

Information
- School type: Provincial, High school
- Motto: "Learning the art of Living...Living the art of Learning"
- Founded: 1972
- School board: Peel District School Board
- Superintendent: Paul Da Silva
- Area trustee: John Marchant
- School number: (905) 274-1271
- Principal: Steven Keenleyside
- Vice principal: Barbara Gordon; Sian Evans
- Grades: 9–12
- Enrolment: 1,300 (Sept 2023)
- Language: English
- Colours: Purple, Orange and White
- Mascot: Panthers
- Website: www.cawthrapark.com

Cawthra Park Secondary School, also known as CPSS, is a public high school built in 1972 located in Southeast Mississauga, Ontario, Canada. It is one of two regional arts schools in the Peel District School Board. Cawthra Park provides instruction to students from grades 9 to 12. Cawthra Park offers a Regional Arts Program, which Peel students may audition to attend. The principal is Steven Keenleyside, as of March 2024.

== Music ==
In May and June 2013, the Cawthra Park Chamber Choir performed with The Rolling Stones in the Air Canada Centre.

== Notable alumni ==
- Erica Peck, lead role in the musical We Will Rock You in Toronto and a Broadway performer
- Daria Werbowy, supermodel
- Spencer Macpherson, Degrassi: Next Class
- André Dae Kim, actor, Degrassi: The Next Generation, Vampire Academy (TV series)
- Wali Shah, singer-songwriter, educational speaker, United Way ambassador and honouree of Canada's Top 20 Under 20
- Sebastien Grainger, singer-songwriter, Death from Above 1979
- Blake McGrath, singer, dancer, star of Dancelife, finalist on So You Think You Can Dance (season 1)
- Deanna Casaluce, actor, Degrassi: The Next Generation
- Adamo Ruggiero, actor, Degrassi: The Next Generation
- Amanda Stepto, actor, Degrassi (1987–1991, 2001–2009)
- David Bryant, guitarist for Godspeed You! Black Emperor
- The FemBots, musicians
- Drew McCreadie, winner of Best Male Improvisor in Canada at the Canadian Comedy Awards.
- J.D Fortune, former replacement INXS lead singer
- Lorne Ryder, singer-songwriter – CCMA and Canadian Smooth Jazz Award Nominee
- Dan Griffin, vocalist/guitarist/keyboardist for the Arkells
- Dave Seglins, CBC News
- Marnie Woodrow, author
- Sabrina Grdevich, actor
- Pooja Handa, CP24 anchor
- Boman Martinez-Reid, comedian
- Karoline Podolak, operatic soprano

== See also ==
- Education in Ontario
- List of secondary schools in Ontario
