= Lucy Ansell =

Australian actress

- Born: Melbourne, Australia
- Occupation: Actress
- Years active: 2019–present

Lucy Ansell is an Australian actress. She is best known for playing Bree in Force of Nature: The Dry 2, and Norma in the Australian comedy drama series Strife.

== Early life ==
Ansell was born in Melbourne, Australia. She is of Afro-Caribbean and English descent. She graduated from the Victorian College of the Arts in 2018

== Career ==
Ansells first appearance in a full-length film came in the mystery thriller Force of Nature: The Dry 2 starring alongside Sisi Stringer and Eric Bana. Ansells first recurring role was in the comedy drama series Strife where she played Norma Ansell has also appeared in theatre productions. Most recently Ansell will feature in a short film called CHINA: Come Home I Need Affection.

== Personal life ==
Her mother Jacqui is her idol, along with all black matriarchs. She said her dream job outside of acting is being a glassmaker, volcanologist or a librarian.

== Filmography ==
=== Film ===
Year	Title	Role	Notes
2019	The Water Inside Us All	Girl	Short
2024	Force of Nature: The Dry 2	Bree	

=== Television ===
Year	Title	Role	Notes
2019	Rostered On	Young Girl 2	Episode: "My Whole House Smells Like Poo"
2019	My Life Is Murder	School Girl	Episode: "Old School"
2019	Utopia	Secretary	Episode: "The Ghost of Christmas Future"
2023–2025	Strife	Norma	9 episodes
