= Podolak =

Podolak is a surname. Notable people with the surname include:

- Arleta Podolak (born 1993), Polish judoka
- Ed Podolak (born 1947), American football running back
- Mitch Podolak (1947–2019), Canadian documentary filmmaker and folk music festival founder
- Karoline Podolak, Canadian–Polish operatic soprano
- Leonard Podolak, Canadian banjoist and founder of The Duhks
