= The Lost Man (novel) =

2018 novel by Jane Harper

- Author: Jane Harper
- Language: English
- Genre: Fiction
- Publisher: Pan Macmillan
- Publication date: 2018
- Publication place: Australia
- Media type: Print (paperback)
- Pages: 384 pp
- ISBN: 9781743549100
- Preceded by: Force of Nature
- Followed by: The Survivors

The Lost Man (2018) is a novel by Australian writer Jane Harper. It was her third novel, and first stand-alone work not featuring her recurring character Aaron Falk. It was originally published in Australia by Pan Macmillan in 2018.

== Abstract ==
"At the grave of a long-dead stockman, hours from anywhere in the middle of the scorching Australian outback, lies a fresh corpse. A dust circle surrounds the grave's headstone, made by the desperate man as he tried to stay within its small shadow, but who lasted less than 24 hours in the fierce heat of an outback 'blasted smooth by a 100-year assault from sand, wind and sun'.

"The dead man, Cameron, is one of three brothers who farm on vast cattle properties in the red desert; driveways run to more than 20 kilometres here; neighbours are hours away. His car is found abandoned and locals begin to ask if Cameron walked to his death; he wouldn't be the first. But as his eldest brother, Nathan – a man reviled by the far-flung community, and who lives a life of horrifying loneliness – digs into the mystery, the discrepancies pile up, and he can't stop asking questions."

== Awards ==
- Ned Kelly Award, Best Novel, 2019
- Davitt Award, Readers' Choice Award, 2019
- International Thriller Writers Awards, Best Paperback Original, 2019
- Martin Beck Award, 2019
- Barry Award, Best Novel, 2020

== Publishing history ==
Following the book's initial publication by Pan Macmillan in 2018 it was subsequently published as follows:

- Little, Brown, 2019, UK, ISBN 9781408711835
- Flatiron Books, 2019, USA, ISBN 9781250105684
- Pan Macmillan, 2019, Australia, ISBN 9781760781064
- It was translated into Swedish (2018), German (2019), Dutch (2019), French (2019), Croatian (2019), Polish (2019), Greek (2020), Hungarian (2020) and Bulgarian (2021)

== Critical reception ==
The reviewer in The Guardian compared this novel with the author's previous works: "The landscape of The Lost Man is even more hostile, even more alien and beautiful, as Harper deftly manipulates her small but fully realised cast to a conclusion that chills, despite the outback heat."

The Kirkus Reviews noted that "Harper's masterful narrative places readers right in the middle of a desolate landscape that's almost as alien as the moon's surface, where the effects of long-term isolation are always a concern." They concluded: "A twisty slow burner by an author at the top of her game."

== See also ==
- 2018 in Australian literature
