= Salvation (TV series) =

2017 science fiction thriller series

- Genre: Drama; Science fiction; Thriller
- Created by: Liz Kruger; Craig Shapiro; Matt Wheeler
- Starring: Santiago Cabrera; Jennifer Finnigan; Charlie Rowe; Jacqueline Byers; Rachel Drance; Shazi Raja; Ian Anthony Dale; Melia Kreiling; Ashley Thomas
- Composer: John Paesano
- Country of origin: United States
- Original language: English
- No. of seasons: 2
- No. of episodes: 26

Production
- Executive producers: Alex Kurtzman; Craig Shapiro; Liz Kruger; Heather Kadin; Juan Carlos Fresnadillo; Peter M. Lenkov; Stuart Gillard
- Production locations: Toronto, Ontario (season 1); Vancouver, British Columbia (season 2)
- Camera setup: Single-camera
- Running time: 43 minutes
- Production companies: Still Married Productions; Secret Hideout; CBS Studios

Original release
- Network: CBS
- Release: July 12, 2017 – September 17, 2018

Salvation is an American suspense drama television series, that premiered on July 12, 2017. The series was originally announced as being developed in September 2013, but received its straight-to-series 13-episode order in October 2016. On October 18, 2017, CBS renewed the series for a 13-episode second season, which premiered on June 25, 2018. On November 20, 2018, CBS canceled the series after two seasons.

== Premise ==
The show centers on the discovery of an asteroid that will impact the Earth in just six months, highlighting the attempts to prevent it and its worldwide ramifications. The show looks at how different individuals and groups of people react to the impending doom.

== Cast ==
=== Main ===
- Santiago Cabrera as Darius Tanz, a billionaire scientist who is the founder and CEO of Tanz Industries and a pivotal player in the United States' defense against the impending asteroid. Darius briefly serves as the Vice President of the United States before becoming president after President Mackenzie's assassination.
- Jennifer Finnigan as Grace Barrows, the Pentagon press secretary, later senior advisor to President Mackenzie and later President Tanz; she has an intimate relationship with Harris Edwards, Deputy Secretary, and later, Secretary of Defense, and works with Darius to prevent the asteroid collision.
- Charlie Rowe as Liam Cole, a student at MIT and later Darius' protégé; he is one of the first people outside the government to predict the asteroid's impending collision with Earth. He, his MIT professor and mentor Malcolm Croft and Darius work together on an EM drive for a gravity tractor they hope to use to change the asteroid's course.
- Jacqueline Byers as Jillian Hayes, a science fiction writer from Boston who becomes involved with Liam and is later chosen by Darius to pick 160 survivors to leave Earth if the asteroid collision cannot be stopped.
- Rachel Drance as Zoe Barrows (season 1; recurring season 2), Grace's daughter
- Shazi Raja as Amanda Neel (season 1), an investigative reporter who is searching for the truth about Darius' and the government's secrets. After learning about the asteroid, Amanda is assassinated before she can publish the story.
- Ian Anthony Dale as Harris Edwards, a graduate of the United States Air Force Academy who now serves as the United States Deputy Secretary of Defense and is one of the few people in Washington, D.C. who knows of the asteroid's impending impact. He is described as a skilled operative but an even better bureaucrat. After his superior is fired, he is promoted to Secretary of Defense.
- Ashley Thomas as Alonzo Carter (season 2), a detective with the D.C. police who is investigating the disappearance of Claire Rayburn
- Melia Kreiling as Alycia Vrettou (season 2), a brilliant computer scientist, former protégé of Darius Tanz, and member of RE/SYST, leading an international group of captive scientists to come up with a plan to prevent the asteroid collision

=== Recurring ===
- Dennis Boutsikaris as Malcolm Croft, a professor at MIT and Liam's mentor
- Erica Luttrell as Claire Rayburn, Senior Adviser and later White House Chief of Staff to President Monroe Bennett.
- Tovah Feldshuh as Pauline Mackenzie, the President of the United States
- Josette Jorge as Karissa (season 1), Darius' assistant
- Sasha Roiz as Monroe Bennett, the vice president, and later president, of the United States
- Mark Moses as Hugh Keating, Grace's father and former CIA agent
- Brian Markinson as Randall Calhoun (season 1), the United States Secretary of Defense who is later fired by President Mackenzie and replaced by Harris Edwards.
- Jeffrey Nordling as Daniel Hayes (season 1), Jillian's father and a bookseller
- John Noble as Nicholas Tanz, Darius' uncle and Chairman of the Board of Directors at Tanz Industries.
- Raven Dauda (season 1) as Harris' secretary
- Autumn Reeser as Theresa (season 1), aka Tess, Darius' first love
- André Dae Kim as Dylan Edwards (recurring season 1, guest season 2), Harris' son and a member of the hacker organization RE/SYST
- Taylor Cole as Fiona Lane (guest season 1; recurring season 2), a bartender with whom Harris Edwards has an affair, but who later is revealed to have a connection to Darius' plans to save humanity
- Madison Smith as Nate Ryland (season 2), a co-worker, a later friend, of Jillian's in the White House
- Jonathan Silverman as Roland Kavanaugh (season 2), the White House Counsel
- Anjali Jay as Dr. Rosetta Stendahl (season 2), an old friend of Darius' and a brilliant scientist. She joins Darius and leads the project to prepare a rail-gun intended to help divert the asteroid.
- Luke Arnold as Bass Shepherd (season 2), the spiritual leader of Children of Planet Earth (COPE), a support group that Jillian joins
- Manoj Sood as Dr. Chandra (season 2), an international specialist in Orbital Dynamics and General Purturbation Theory
- James Lesure as Trey Thompson (season 2), a two-term congressman and former NASA pilot who is later named Vice President under Tanz.

== Episodes ==
Season	Episodes	Originally released	
Season	Episodes	First released	Last released
1	13	July 12, 2017	September 20, 2017
2	13	June 25, 2018	September 17, 2018

=== Season 1 (2017) ===
No. overall	No. in season	Title	Directed by	Written by	Original release date	U.S. viewers (millions)
1	1	"Pilot"	Juan Carlos Fresnadillo	Story by : Matt Wheeler; Teleplay by : Liz Kruger & Craig Shapiro & Matt Wheeler	July 12, 2017	4.90
Liam Cole, an MIT grad, discovers an asteroid headed towards Earth. After informing his instructor, who later goes missing, he gains the assistance of Darius Tanz, a billionaire scientist. The two later speak with Harris Edwards, the Deputy Secretary of Defense, who tells them that the United States government is already aware and plans to keep word of the asteroid secret. Liam and Darius are informed of the plan the government has to stop the asteroid and realize that the plan won't work. Darius then begins putting his own plan into motion. Darius later gains the support of Grace Barrows, the Pentagon press secretary, after she also finds out that the government's plan failed. Meanwhile, Liam returns to his girlfriend in his hometown of Boston but ultimately decides to help Darius after having second thoughts.
2	2	"Another Trip Around the Sun"	Ken Fink	Corey Miller	July 19, 2017	4.28
Following the failure of the last plan, the Department of Defense begins looking for a new strategy. Darius receives funding from the U.S. government for his newest idea, which involves an electromagnetic drive. Meanwhile, after a Pentagon employee is found dead at his residence, Amanda, a news reporter, finds it suspicious that no autopsy was performed and begins digging into what he was working on. Liam is tasked with finding his missing MIT instructor, whom he later finds when his research is needed for Darius's plan. Also, Grace almost gets arrested by military police after authorizing an illegal uranium transfer, which is also needed for Darius's plan, from a maximum security classified facility.
3	3	"Truth or Darius"	Stuart Gillard	Gavin Johannsen & Dennis Saldua	July 26, 2017	3.87
Darius is only given six days to prove his electromagnetic drive will work. Dylan Edwards, Harris' son, is arrested after a peaceful protest he was in turns violent. Liam and Malcolm, Liam's professor, find a matching frequency. Darius' company builds a prototype of the electromagnetic drive, which ultimately fails. Grace goes behind Harris' back in an attempt to get Claire Rayburn, Senior Advisor for the White House, to approve a delay on the Department of Defense's plan. The electromagnetic drive is destroyed in its first test. Jillian Hayes, a science fiction writer and Liam's love interest, is offered a job by Darius, which she accepts and moves to D.C. The President gives the order to move forward with the original plan. Darius appears to hack NASA, which causes the plan not to move forward. Amanda is injured during a hit-and-run.
4	4	"The Human Strain"	Greg Beeman	Mike Werb	August 2, 2017	3.61
5	5	"Keeping the Faith"	Jennifer Lynch	Angela L. Harvey	August 2, 2017	3.61
Following the failed launch attempt to destroy the asteroid, Darius goes missing. The DoD raids his office building. He is later found at an airport and is arrested on suspicion of high treason. Jillian is tasked with assisting a team in a search to find the "perfect 160 people" needed in an attempt to colonize the planet Mars, which proves difficult. Malcolm attempts to rebuild the destroyed electromagnetic drive. In an interrogation room, Darius leaves Grace a clue which leads her and Liam to a compound found in the middle of the woods. In the compound they find a rocket ship named "Salvation", along with the missing uranium. In the back of an arcade game, Liam finds a motherboard, which when turned on connects the server to NASA. Liam disconnects the server and NASA regains control of the probe, proving Darius' innocence. However, with the probe traveling too close to Jupiter, it's lost due to gravitational pull. It is later revealed that Lazlow, Darius' Head of Security, was the one who performed the hack. Upon arriving to arrest him, he is found to have committed suicide. Meanwhile, Liam and Malcolm manage to get the electromagnetic drive prototype operational. The now-functioning prototype is moved to a larger facility for testing. The government decides to pull funding given to Darius' company. Amanda awakens in the hospital to be informed that she received a minor concussion. The transport with the drive is set up and the driver killed. The shooters take the drive as well as take Liam and Malcolm hostage. Meanwhile, Amanda is released from the hospital and her supervisor pulls her from the story she was working on prior to the accident. After Malcolm accidentally slips, Liam finds out that Malcolm is the mole who has been inside Darius' company and was in on the set up. Darius and Grace are also informed after a facial recognition match. Malcolm later reveals he is secretly working with the Russian government. Amanda continues to secretly work on the story and receives a major lead from an anonymous person. It is revealed that Malcolm is the one who killed Lazlow. Liam manages to break loose and acquire a gun, which he is forced to use to shoot Malcolm and his accomplice. An anti-terrorism team arrives at the airport too late to prevent the drive from being taken.
6	6	"Chip Off the Ol' Block"	Russell Fine	Blake Taylor	August 9, 2017	3.11
The U.S. military officially cut all ties with Darius' company following the report of the missing drive. Grace is informed by her Russian contact that the drive was stolen as retribution for Project ATLAS. When the place in Siberia where the drive was stored is trapped in a storm, the DoD only has 36 hours to plan an attempt to retrieve it. Darius and Liam travel to London in an attempt to gain material for a new drive. Jillian visits Amanda and confides her worries about Liam to her, and Amanda shares her investigation with Jillian. After she confronts him, Liam finally tells Jillian about the asteroid on a collision course with Earth. Harris, Liam, Darius, and Grace begin planning a secret extraction in order to collect a key element needed to build a new drive. However, in the middle of extraction, they are ambushed by the Russian military. Also, Liam is forced to return to an empty home when Jillian decides to return to Boston.
7	7	"Seeing Red"	Robbie Duncan McNeill	Christina M. Walker	August 16, 2017	2.91
8	8	"From Russia, With Love"	Nick Gomez	Dennis Saldua	August 16, 2017	2.91
Russia begins threatening the United States with nuclear war. Darius and Liam build a new drive, however, they are not able to launch it without "starting World War III". Zoe Barrows, Grace's daughter, begins digging in to Harris' son after Grace tells Zoe that she and Harris are dating. Jillian returns home to Boston and tells her father she quit her job and is moving back, and finds out that he is engaged. Darius and Grace travel to Russia in hopes of solving the diplomatic issues. In Russia, Grace informs her contact about the asteroid in an attempt to get a meeting with a ranking Russian official. With Grace off the grid, Harris begins searching for her. Darius finds out that the previous asteroid that hit Russia in 2013 was a weapon created using his technology under the working title "Project ATLAS". Grace gets a meeting with the Russian Minister of Defence. Harris learns from Liam that Darius and Grace are in Moscow. Darius and Grace plan to meet with the minister of defence, but the car sent for them blows up before they enter. They return to their hotel to find Grace's informant dead, and they leave just before the police arrive. Harris is informed that Grace was the one who took the Uranium and immediately suspended her security clearance. Following the murder of Grace's informant, a manhunt is underway in Russia for Darius and Grace, who fake their identities in an attempt to escape. Darius informs Liam that if they don't make it out of Russia he will need to expedite the 160 selection process. Grace and Darius ultimately decide to surrender themselves at the Russian airport. Harris informs Randall Calhoun, Secretary of Defense, about Darius' and Grace's location, who later says they are on their own. Darius and Grace are taken to an unknown location in Russia, where they later find Malcolm, who survived the gunshot from Liam. Malcolm tells them that the only way he will be able to stop the asteroid is by working with Russia. Dylan begins digging into Zoe after she sends him a friend request on Facebook. Darius and Grace finally meet with the minister of defense, who agrees to present their proposal to the Russian military. Zoe reaches out to Dylan and the two finally meet. The Russian minister of defense later tells Darius and Grace that their proposal has been accepted. After returning to the United States, Grace is arrested for violation of the Logan Act; however, she is later released. Also, Jillian returns to D.C. after Liam and her grandfather convince her to.
9	9	"Patriot Games"	Maja Vrvilo	Gavin Johannsen	August 23, 2017	3.13
Grace is attacked and almost killed at her home; however, she is able to kill the attacker. Amanda receives an unmarked envelope with a flash drive containing files about Project ATLAS. Collaboration begins between the U.S. and Russian governments in an attempt to launch the drive. Amanda publishes the files online, causing the Russian government to pull the joint deal. The President denies all claims made by the press, forcing Amanda to go on a hunt to find a reputable source. The United States Pentagon Police arrive at Darius' company to confiscate the drive. Darius agrees to go on record for Amanda as long as she puts him in touch with an underground resistance team. NASA launches the drive, but Russia launches missiles from international waters, destroying it before it can reach the asteroid. Darius reveals that he gave NASA a fake drive, and he gets the underground team to agree to block all of Russia's satellites. This gives Darius a chance to launch the drive on his own, which successfully reaches orbit.
10	10	"Coup de Grace"	Dan Lerner	Angela L. Harvey	August 30, 2017	3.44
When trying to get a meeting with the president, Darius and Grace are informed that the president is ill. Darius chooses to go public and verify Amanda's story by claiming to be her source. The Secret Service later finds Darius and Grace and tells them the president wishes to meet with them. The president continues to deny any knowledge of Project ATLAS. Darius informs the president that the person responsible for attacking Grace works inside the White House. Grace decides to tell Zoe about the asteroid, but when she visits her workplace, she is informed that Zoe has quit. Grace tracks Zoe and finds her with Dylan. The President tells Harris that she is firing the Secretary of Defense and promoting him to Acting Secretary of Defense. Darius and Liam find out that the drive has been hacked by the government, who plan to collide it with the asteroid, which would cause fragments of it to fall on Russia and China, destroying both countries. The board of directors at Darius' company holds a vote and removes him as CEO. In the middle of a public announcement, the president collapses and later dies. The vice president is sworn in as the new president.
11	11	"All In"	Ed Ornelas	Corey Miller	September 6, 2017	3.45
Grace informs Harris that her daughter and his son are romantically involved. The board at Darius' company requires an audit to find out what happened to the missing billion dollars. Meanwhile, Amanda is determined to find out what the president was going to say in her State of the Union address before she died. The new president tasks Harris with destroying the underground hacktivist group, RE/SYST, which Harris' son is a part of. Also, Liam proposes to Jillian, and she accepts. Grace is later informed that her daughter has bugged her phone. Liam introduces Jillian to his mother and tells her that they are getting married that day. Amanda finds a rough draft of the president's script. She begins investigating a "Project Samson" described as post-apocalyptic which was mentioned in the draft. Jillian, leaves Liam at the altar and says she needs more time. A strike team mobilizes on RE/SYST's headquarters and blows up the building. It was later reported that six bodies were recovered.
12	12	"The Wormwood Prophecy"	Greg Prange	Mike Werb	September 13, 2017	3.51
When it is found that the asteroid is made of different material than originally thought, it is proven that the drive will not work as planned. Darius and Harris make a plan to regain control of it. Zoe returns home and tells Harris that his son died in the bombing. Liam and Jillian begin narrowing down the final candidates to fill the 160 slots needed in the attempt to start a self-sustaining human colony on Mars. Harris finds it suspicious that no autopsy is performed on the president's body and plans to do one himself. Amanda finds another draft of the president's speech, but this one is encrypted. Following successful translation of the speech, she knows that an asteroid is headed towards Earth. Upon digging up the president's grave, all that is found is an empty casket. Grace finally tells Zoe about the asteroid. Harris begins digging deeper into the president's grave and finds out that she is still alive. In the process of sending an e-mail about the asteroid, Amanda's office building is infiltrated. Amanda and her boss are both shot, but Amanda still manages to press "send". The office is then set on fire.
13	13	"The Plot Against America"	Stuart Gillard	Liz Kruger & Craig Shapiro	September 20, 2017	3.13
The underground resistance group bombs a U.S. military ship off the coast of Florida using Darius' software. However, it was made to appear that Russian submarines performed the attack. Harris and Grace begin coming up with a plan to get the presumed dead president reinstated into office. Following Amanda's death, Darius and Liam meet with the underground resistance group. Darius agrees to give them his supercomputer and in exchange they grant him control of the drive. Claire corners Harris in a parking garage and threatens to kill him, but Grace shoots her before she can. Harris manages to get the power of the presumed-dead president re-instated. The President then makes her initial statement with the intent of informing United States citizens about impact of the asteroid. NORAD interrupts the broadcast with their own statement about Russian nuclear missiles headed towards the D.C. area. This causes Darius to immediately put his 160 plan into action.

=== Season 2 (2018) ===
No. overall	No. in season	Title	Directed by	Written by	Original release date	U.S. viewers (millions)
14	1	"Fall Out"	Stuart Gillard	Liz Kruger & Craig Shapiro	June 25, 2018	3.36
Tensions flare inside the "Salvation" bunker where 160 people including Harris, Grace, and Jillian are locked inside. The United States Military launches their defense systems in an attempt to stop the incoming Russian missiles. Five days later, Darius opens the bunker and informs Grace that he is now the Vice President. Most of the Russian missiles are stopped. However, one of them was hacked by "RE/SYST", the underground hacktivist group, which changed the target of the missile to Lebanon, Kansas, which is the geographic center of the contiguous United States. RE/SYST makes an announcement to the world stating that they now control the drive and thereby hold the fate of the world in their hands, and adding that any country refusing to meet their demands would face consequences. Included in RE/SYST's demands are using Tanz Industries HQ as their base of operations, forcing the government to nationalize Tanz Industries. RE/SYST is also putting together a team of scientists in which Liam is their top pick. The President picks Darius to become the Vice President. The President also officially promotes Harris from Acting Secretary of Defense to Secretary of Defense and Grace to Senior Adviser. Upon arriving for RE/SYST's team of scientists, Liam finds out that Malcolm is also a part of the team.
15	2	"Détente"	Ken Fink	Gavin Johannsen	July 2, 2018	3.11
Liam and Malcolm clash at the first meeting of the scientist team. Detective Alonzo Carter begins looking into the disappearance of Claire. Meanwhile, Darius and Grace take a trip under the radar to Reykjavik, Iceland, despite RE/SYST's travel ban in an attempt to begin building their own counter-team of scientists. Jillian begins settling into her new role as Assistant to the Vice President and also temporarily moves in with Grace. Darius successfully pitches his idea in Iceland. Darius is shot twice following his speech; he survives due to wearing a bulletproof shirt. Liam finds out that another member of the team previously worked for Darius. The former Vice President, Monroe Bennett, who temporarily served as President, claimed that his power as President was illegally revoked and that he is still the President. It is later found that he is forming his own military to regain the Presidency. Alonzo visits Grace and informs her that he is Claire's brother.
16	3	"Crimes and Punishment"	Maja Vrvilo	Mike Werb	July 9, 2018	2.57
Monroe officially files a case with the United States Supreme Court in his newest attempt to regain office. Darius begins building a railgun with the assistance of Iceland. However, all the employees left after conflicting arguments on whom to report to. Disagreements continue to arise in the team of scientists. Alonzo begins digging deeper into Claire's death. Liam receives pressure from Darius to shut down his supercomputer which would lower RE/SYST's threat level. Claire's body unexpectedly shows up in the morgue after washing on up on the beach shore. Flash mobs continue to grow outside the White House and Supreme Court. A suicide bomber blows up an office in the Supreme Court after threats against her family, seriously injuring Chief Justice Cheng and leaving the Court at a 4-4 result as to who is the legal president of the United States. Meanwhile, Mackenzie prepares for a second civil war within the United States as she approves mobilization of the National Guard.
17	4	"Indivisible"	Dan Lerner	Damani Johnson	July 16, 2018	2.53
Cheng remains in critical condition as the number of protests increase. Liam confronts Alycia Vrettou, a member of the team assembled by RE/SYST, after he finds out she is actually a member of the hacker group. She gives him permission to leave the Tanz headquarters. Grace is tasked to travel to Cheng's hospital and retrieve his vote on who is the legitimate president. Harris finds out that a general is leaking information to Bennett. Bennett makes a post on social media asking his supporters to raid the hospital. Darius informs Grace of the raid, but she refuses to leave until she officially has Cheng's decision on the case video-recorded. Darius, Harris, and Pauline decide to shut down the Internet in an attempt to prevent Bennett from communicating with his supporters. Alonzo tracks down Grace at the hospital and helps her escape safely with Cheng's vote. Liam decides to return to the RE/SYST asteroid team following a disagreement with Darius. With the hospital surrounded, the President sends a helicopter to pick up Grace and Alonzo on the hospital's helipad, but as it attempts to land, it is hit by a surface-to-air rocket.
18	5	"White House Down"	Douglas Aarniokoski	Carolyn Townsend	July 23, 2018	2.57
Following the explosion of the helicopter Grace is forced to work with Alonzo to escape. Bennett, using his military forces, infiltrates the White House. Despite the White House being on lock down, Darius and Harris sneak out in an attempt to find Grace. After successfully finding Grace and Alonzo the four return to the White House to find it is under attack. Bennett and his forces take over the Oval Office forcing Mackenzie to surrender. Prior to voluntarily surrendering Darius tasks Liam with turning the internet back on and publishing the video with Cheng's decision. As Bennett plans to announce his victory the video with Cheng's decision is broadcast across all of the United States. This forces Bennett and his forces to surrender allowing Mackenzie to remain as president without any opposition. Bennett is subsequently arrested.
19	6	"Let the Chips Fall"	Greg Prange	K.D. Davila	July 30, 2018	2.60
Due to his assistance Grace allows Alonzo access to Claire's autopsy report. Darius decides to resign as Vice President in an attempt to shift more of his focus to the railgun project. Under Mackenzie's advisement, he agrees not to disclose his resignation until a replacement is named. Grace begins putting together a list of possible replacements with Harris at the top of the list. Grace later admits to Darius that she is responsible for Claire's murder. Grace's father admits to killing Claire to keep Grace from being arrested. After RE/SYST comes up with a plan to forcefully take over the railgun project, Liam gets backing from the rest of the team to leave the group if it isn't done peacefully. Harris begins interrogating Bennett, but Bennett is later found dead in his cell before he is able to give any information. After giving a speech Mackenzie is shot and killed by a sniper, making Darius the president of the United States.
20	7	"The Madness of King Tanz"	Nick Gomez	Blake Taylor	August 6, 2018	2.44
Darius assumes the duties as president following Mackenzie's assassination. Liam finds out that Darius' newest plan is to use the railgun to shoot down RE/SYST's nukes instead of the asteroid. Liam visits Darius in an attempt to make peace between RE/SYST and the United States but Darius has Liam arrested for treason. Harris finds out that Fiona is secretly working for someone else and was forced by them to infiltrate Darius' salvation project. RE/SYST issues an official statement saying that if Liam is not released they will drop a nuclear bomb on New York City. Grace declines Darius' offer to become Chief of Staff due to his refusal to comply with RE/SYST. At Liam's request Jillian visits the team of scientists to negotiate. Grace admits to Alonzo that she killed Claire after he confronts her about covering for her father. Jillian resigns as Darius' personal assistant. Liam is released after Alycia claims RE/SYST will disarm the nukes, this is later proven untrue. When Harris and Grace visit Darius they find that he is missing.
21	8	"Abre Sus Ojos"	Tessa Blake	Steven Maeda	August 13, 2018	2.62
Harris and Grace believe that Fiona's organisation was involved in Darius' disappearance. They use Fiona to locate those running her - a secretive organisation called Q17. Raul Aguirre appears at Tanz Industries and gives them the nano technology to help with the solar sail. Liam notices the missiles are still armed, and gets into an argument with Alycia, who confirms that RE/SYST will never give up the missiles. Later, Raul reveals to Liam that he is Darius in disguise and requests Liam's help to stop RE/SYST by using a chip to disable TESS. Harris and Grace visit Dr. Rosetta Stendahl to stop the launch of the rail gun because of the RE/SYST threat, explaining that Darius is missing, but she initially refuses. At Tanz Industries Liam betrays Darius to Alycia. While Darius is being interrogated, Liam goes to disable TESS. However, he is stopped by Malcolm. In a fight, Liam drops the chip. When Malcolm is told Raul is Darius, Malcolm goes to get the chip, but it is seen by Alycia. Malcolm gets the chip, but is killed when throwing it to Liam. Stendahl tries to stop the rail gun being fired, but she is locked out. As the rail gun fires, Liam manages to disable TESS. No missiles are fired and the satellite is destroyed by the rail gun slug.
22	9	"The Manchurian Candidate"	Nina Lopez-Corrado	Damani Johnson & Gavin Johannsen	August 20, 2018	2.53
Liam takes control of Tanz HQ for Darius and begins returning it to its pre-RE/SYST state including rebooting TESS. Darius begins searching for a Vice President with the intent for them to take over as President if he resigns. Liam and Jillian begin seeing each other again. Grace and Harris contact Alonzo for assistance. Alonzo initially refuses but is later forced into it. Jillian takes Liam to COPE, her support group. Nicholas, Darius' uncle, returns to the United States. Darius informs Grace of his plan to resign so that he can focus on the solar sail project. Nicholas spooks Grace when he begins asking questions about Zoe. Nicholas informs Darius that his people killed President Mackenzie so that Darius could become president. Liam tells Darius and Grace that he believes COPE is a suicide cult and that Jillian is in trouble.
23	10	"Prisoners"	Joe Gallagher	Mark Kruger	August 27, 2018	2.56
Alycia, wearing a disguise, is found in public by the FBI. Darius has Jillian picked up for safety and she is angry with Liam for worrying. Zoe returns home from Africa. Liam and Darius begin preparing for the solar sail launch. Grace receives a call from a private number threatening Zoe's life. Alonzo volunteers to be Zoe's bodyguard. Darius puts out the order for Nicholas to be captured by the FBI dead or alive. Grace's father is stabbed in prison. Grace has Darius arrange a flight and plans to leave the country with her father and Zoe. Alycia assists Darius and Liam in the solar sail project. Nicholas is found attempting to flee the country and arrested at the airport. Jillian decides to move out of Grace's house. Grace finds out that Zoe is pregnant with Dylan's child. Jillian and Zoe go missing, causing Alonzo to put out an APB and go searching. Grace informs Harris of Zoe's pregnancy. Liam and Alycia ultimately decide to launch the solar sail despite the deteriorating weather conditions. The launch is successful. Darius makes a public speech informing the United States of the solar sail launch. Jillian finds Zoe shelter at COPE in exchange for giving Bass Shepherd, leader of COPE, information about Darius' railgun project.
24	11	"Celebration Day"	Stuart Gillard	Carolyn Townsend	September 3, 2018	2.43
After a successful firing of the rail gun, Darius holds a press conference at which a COPE reporter commits suicide. An investigation of COPE highlights that they have been buying weapons. Alycia is asked to help find Bass Shepherd using her RE/SYST contacts. She refuses, but is persuaded by Grace. Alonzo gets a tip off on a possible sighting of a COPE location, and goes to investigate. He informs Harris, who uses satellite footage which confirms that Jillian and Zoe are there, but Bass has gone. The FBI are then sent and both Harris and Grace follow. Alonzo, believing that a mass suicide is about to happen, goes up to the house. Indicating that he is looking for Jillian and Zoe he enters, but is shot by Nora. Alycia starts getting help from RE/SYST. But when TV news about the COPE location appears on the internet, she is doxxed by RE/SYST who say she is a traitor for working with the US government. Grace enters the house, and with Jillian's help she manages to get Zoe and Alonzo out. Harris and the FBI then assault the house, but Nora escapes with Jillian. Darius realises that the rail gun is the target of attack. He orders Dr. Rosetta Stendahl to shut down the rail gun, and evacuate the site. Nate manages to get into the control room, infecting the computer with a virus which causes the rail gun to be destroyed killing Dr. Rosetta Stendahl and Nate.
25	12	"Hail Marry"	Joe Gallagher	Jeffrey Lieber and K.D. Dávila	September 10, 2018	2.74
After the destruction of the rail gun, riots erupt around the country. Darius resigns as the president, and puts in motion a plan to ram "Salvation" against the asteroid. Jillian is held captive by Bass Shepherd. She confronts him about the destruction of the rail gun, but he blames her because she gave him the information. Harris and Grace look at buying a bunker, but they can't afford it. But in a meeting, Harris finds out he may be able to save Grace and Zoe. Darius makes a deal with Nicholas to get his meteorite for use with the EM drives. A problem is found with the rail gun slugs already fired putting in doubt ramming the asteroid. Nicholas requests a meeting with Darius, about saving Grace and Zoe, but instead kidnaps him. Jillian escapes and manages to phone Liam, but the phone dies just as she sees Darius with Nicholas.
26	13	"Get Ready"	Liz Kruger	Liz Kruger and Craig Shapiro	September 17, 2018	2.61
As Harris prepares to launch a nuclear missile at the asteroid as a last-ditch, best-case-scenario option, a badly injured Darius acts on a hunch to prove that their best course of action is to do nothing. Just seconds before the nuke is launched, Darius convinces Harris to abort the launch by revealing that the object is not an asteroid. Moments later, the still unidentified spherical object comes to a halt, hovering "like a hummingbird" between the Earth and the Moon.

== Production ==
The first season was filmed in Toronto, Ontario. The show relocated to Vancouver, British Columbia for its second season.

== Reception ==
On the review aggregator website Rotten Tomatoes, the series has an approval rating of 47% based on 17 reviews, with an average rating of 5.75/10. The site's critical consensus reads: "Neither remarkably bad nor impressively well-made, Salvation is stereotypical summer television – a low-stakes diversion that may pass the time well enough for undemanding audiences without ever being particularly memorable along the way." On Metacritic, the series has a score of 48 out of 100, based on 18 critics, indicating "mixed or average reviews".

=== Ratings ===
Salvation : U.S. viewers per episode (millions)
Audience measurement performed by Nielsen Media Research

==== Season 1 ====
Viewership and ratings per episode of Salvation
No.	Title	Air date	Rating/share (18–49)	Viewers (millions)	DVR (18–49)	DVR viewers (millions)	Total (18–49)	Total viewers (millions)
1	"Pilot"	July 12, 2017	0.7/3	4.90	0.2	1.65	0.9	6.55
2	"Another Trip Around the Sun"	July 19, 2017	0.7/3	4.28	0.2	1.59	0.9	5.87
3	"Truth or Darius"	July 26, 2017	0.6/3	3.87	—N/a	—N/a	—N/a	—N/a
4	"The Human Strain"	August 2, 2017	0.5/2	3.61	0.2	1.34	0.7	4.95
5	"Keeping the Faith"	August 2, 2017	0.5/2	3.61	0.2	1.34	0.7	4.95
6	"Chip Off the Ol' Block"	August 9, 2017	0.5/2	3.11	0.2	1.30	0.7	4.42
7	"Seeing Red"	August 16, 2017	0.4/2	2.91	0.2	1.34	0.6	4.23
8	"From Russia, With Love"	August 16, 2017	0.4/2	2.91	0.2	1.34	0.6	4.23
9	"Patriot Games"	August 23, 2017	0.4/2	3.13	0.2	1.18	0.6	4.31
10	"Coup de Grace"	August 30, 2017	0.5/2	3.44	0.2	1.33	0.7	4.69
11	"All In"	September 6, 2017	0.5/2	3.45	—N/a	—N/a	—N/a	—N/a
12	"The Wormwood Prophecy"	September 13, 2017	0.5/2	3.51	0.2	1.33	0.7	4.84
13	"The Plot Against America"	September 20, 2017	0.5/2	3.13	—N/a	—N/a	—N/a	—N/a

==== Season 2 ====
Viewership and ratings per episode of Salvation
No.	Title	Air date	Rating/share (18–49)	Viewers (millions)	DVR (18–49)	DVR viewers (millions)	Total (18–49)	Total viewers (millions)
1	"Fall Out"	June 25, 2018	0.4/2	3.36	0.2	1.26	0.6	4.62
2	"Détente"	July 2, 2018	0.4/2	3.11	0.2	1.08	0.6	4.20
3	"Crimes and Punishment"	July 9, 2018	0.3/1	2.57	0.2	1.04	0.5	3.61
4	"Indivisible"	July 16, 2018	0.3/1	2.53	0.2	0.94	0.5	3.47
5	"White House Down"	July 23, 2018	0.3/1	2.57	0.1	0.96	0.4	3.53
6	"Let the Chips Fall"	July 30, 2018	0.3/1	2.60	0.2	1.08	0.5	3.69
7	"The Madness of King Tanz"	August 6, 2018	0.3/1	2.44	0.1	1.02	0.4	3.46
8	"Abre Sus Ojos"	August 13, 2018	0.3/1	2.62	0.2	1.01	0.5	3.63
9	"The Manchurian Candidate"	August 20, 2018	0.3/1	2.53	0.2	1.03	0.5	3.57
10	"Prisoners"	August 27, 2018	0.3/1	2.56	0.2	0.91	0.5	3.48
11	"Celebration Day"	September 3, 2018	0.3/1	2.43	0.2	1.00	0.5	3.43
12	"Hail Marry"	September 10, 2018	0.4/2	2.74	0.1	1.02	0.5	3.76
13	"Get Ready"	September 17, 2018	0.4/2	2.61	0.1	0.94	0.5	3.56

=== Awards and nominations ===
Year	Ceremony	Category	Nominee(s)	Result	Ref.
2017	The Joey Awards	Best Recurring Principal or Guest Star Actor in a TV Series Age 13 Years & Over	André Dae Kim	Nominated	
2018	Saturn Awards	Best Science Fiction Television Series	Salvation	Nominated	

== Home media ==
Season	Episodes	DVD release dates				Blu-ray release dates			
Season	Episodes	Region 1	Region 2	Region 4	Discs	Region A/1	Region B/2	Region C/3	Discs
1	13	December 19, 2017	TBA	—N/a	4	TBA	TBA	—N/a	TBA
