= Exiles (novel) =

2022 crime novel by Australian writer Jane Harper

- Author: Jane Harper
- Language: English
- Series: Aaron Falk trilogy
- Genre: Crime
- Publisher: Pan Macmillan
- Publication date: 20 September 2022
- Publication place: Australia
- Media type: Print
- Pages: 416 pp.
- Awards: Ned Kelly Award Best Novel, 2023
- ISBN: 9781760988425
- Preceded by: The Survivors
- Followed by: -

Exiles (2022) is a crime novel by Australian writer, Jane Harper. It was originally published by Pan Macmillan in Australia in 2022.

This novel is the third, and final installment in the author's Aaron Falk series, following The Dry (2016), and Force of Nature (2017). The novel won the Ned Kelly Award for Best Novel in 2023.

== Synopsis ==
A year before the main timeline of this novel Aaron Falk had been in the small South Australian wine-making town of Marralee visiting the annual Marralee Valley Food and Wine Festival at the invitation of some friends who live in the town. During that festival thirty-nine-year-old Kim Gillespie went missing, leaving her six-week-old daughter alone in a stroller. A frantic search for the woman finds nothing. The mystery remains unsolved.

A year later and Falk is back in town for the festival again staying with his friend, Greg Raco, a police officer who is uncle to Gillespie's teenage daughter. Raco persuades Falk to look over the material he has gathered on the disappearance but nothing, initially, seems to stand out. We learn that Gillespie's husband appears to have a firm alibi for the night and that Gillespie had been suffering from depression. One of her shoes has been found in a nearby reservoir and it is generally considered that she committed suicide, though no-one can fathom why.

In the background is the six-year-old fatal hit-and-run case of Dean Tozer, the late husband of a woman that Falk is interested in. The two cases, both being unresolved, could be connected though no-one can find the link.

== Publishing history ==
After its initial publication in Australia by Pan Macmillan in 2022, the novel was reprinted by Pan Macmillan in 2023.

The novel has also been translated into French, Greek, German, Dutch and Danish in 2023.

== Critical reception ==
Writing in The Sydney Morning Herald Sue Turbull concluded: "In the end, Exiles is a book as much about friendship as it is about family. While there’s a crime at its centre, it’s also about kindness and care. The moment when Falk silently helps Joel clean the graffiti from his father’s memorial by the reservoir a touching case in point. Quietly and inevitably, the secrets and deceptions are unravelled as Falk finds himself deftly woven into the weft of this small community. In Exiles, Falk, may at last have come home."

Marion Winik in The Washington Post stated: "Though she makes a point of careful plotting and neatly tied-up threads, Harper’s books are as much about Australian society and the pressures and dangers of the country’s landscape as they are about finding missing people and solving murders. Social issues like domestic abuse, addiction and bullying play a significant role in her plots, and Exiles is no exception."

== Awards ==
- Ned Kelly Award Best Novel, 2023 winner

== See also ==
- 2022 in Australian literature
