= The Dry (novel) =

2016 mystery debut novel by Jane Harper

- Author: Jane Harper
- Language: English
- Series: Aaron Falk trilogy
- Genre: Crime
- Publisher: Macmillan Publishers
- Publication date: 31 May 2016
- Publication place: Australia
- Pages: 336
- ISBN: 1-250-10560-9
- Followed by: Force of Nature

The Dry is the 2016 debut novel by Australian author Jane Harper. The book has won numerous international awards and has sold more than one million copies worldwide. A film adaptation starring Eric Bana was released on 1 January 2021 with great success, placing it as one of the highest grossing Australian film opening weekends ever.

It is the first installment in Harper's Aaron Falk trilogy, followed by Force of Nature (2017) and Exiles (2022).

== Synopsis ==
Australian Federal Police agent Aaron Falk returns to his hometown, the (fictional) struggling farming community of Kiewarra, for the funeral of his childhood best friend, Luke Hadler, and his wife Karen and son Billy. It is widely believed that Luke killed his family in a murder-suicide, but Luke's father Gerry and mother Barb ask him to investigate other possibilities. Twenty years earlier, Falk and his father left Kiewarra following the death of Falk's friend Ellie Deacon, which Falk was suspected of; Falk and Luke lied about their alibis. After Luke's death, Gerry sent Falk a message: "Luke lied. You lied. Be at the funeral."

Falk meets Sergeant Greg Raco, a police officer investigating the deaths, who also doubts whether Luke killed his family. One reason for this is that Luke's baby daughter, Charlotte, was not killed; another is that the ammunition used in the killings does not match what Luke had on the property. Falk and Raco work together to investigate the deaths. They meet Jamie Sullivan, the last person to report seeing Luke alive, hunting rabbits together. They visit the local school that Billy attended, where Karen worked part-time as a bookkeeper, and discover that Billy was due to play at the house of the principal, Scott Whitlam, on the day he was killed, but that Karen cancelled at the last minute.

Gerry tells Falk that he saw Luke cycling away from the river where Ellie drowned, and also saw a white ute driving after him; he suspects this might have something to do with the deaths. Raco discovers that Sullivan lied about being at his farm during the murders. Falk's car is vandalised because of his alleged involvement with Ellie's death. Falk finds a note in one of Karen's library books that says "'Grant?" and has Falk's phone number written down (even though they had never met); Falk thinks this refers to Grant Dow, Ellie's cousin.

Sullivan gets in a fight with Grant and then reveals that during the deaths he was with the local doctor, Dr Leigh, with whom he is in a gay relationship. Falk visits Ellie's grave and argues with Mal Deacon, her father, who now has dementia. Raco interviews Deacon, who remembers that he had an alibi for the time of the murders; he was on the phone with someone from the local pharmacy. Falk has dinner with Gretchen Schoner, a childhood friend of his, Luke's and Ellie's, but they argue after he sees a photo album that makes him suspect Luke was the father of her son. Gretchen tells Falk that she knows where Luke was the day Ellie died, but refuses to tell him.

Falk realises (and this is also revealed in a flashback), that Scott (the principal) killed the family after Karen realised that he had stolen money from a grant for the school to pay off some of his gambling debts; this is what her note referred to. Whitlam discovers that the police know what he did and threatens to burn down the town, but Falk and Raco are able to stop him, though they suffer burns.

Gretchen tells Falk that she and Luke were together when they saw Ellie the day she died, and failed to tell anyone out of guilt that they had not spoken to her (they believe she died in a suicide); she was the driver of the white ute. Falk finds an old diary of Ellie's that reveals (and this is also shown in flashbacks) that Ellie was killed by Grant and Mal after she tried to run away from home because she had been abused by Mal; he decides to reveal this information.

== Reception ==
=== Literary awards ===
The Dry has won multiple major awards, including the following:

Year	Award	Category	Result	Ref
2016	Fellowship of Australian Writers	Christina Stead Fiction Award	Shortlisted	
	Victorian Premier's Literary Award	Unpublished Manuscript	Won	
2017	Australian Book Industry Award	Book of the Year	Won	
2017	Australian Book Industry Award	General Fiction	Won	
2017	Australian Book Industry Award	Matt Richell Award for New Writer	Shortlisted	
2017	Books Are My Bag Readers' Award	Popular Fiction	Shortlisted	
2017	CWA Gold Dagger	—	Won	
2017	Davitt Award	Adult Crime Novel	Won	
2017	Davitt Award	Readers' Choice	Won	
2017	Goodreads Choice Award	Mystery & Thriller	Won	
2017	Goodreads Choice Award	Debut	Won	
2017	Indie Book Award	Debut Fiction	Won	
2017	Ned Kelly Award	Debut Crime	Won	
2018	Anthony Award	First Novel	Shortlisted	
2018	Barry Award	First Novel	Won	
2018	British Book Award	Crime & Thriller	Won	
2018	Macavity Award	First Novel	Shortlisted	
2018	International Dublin Literary Award	—	Longlisted	
2018	RUSA CODES Reading List	Mystery	Shortlisted	
2018	Theakston's Old Peculier Crime Novel of the Year Award	—	Shortlisted	

=== Distinctions ===
- Amazon's Best Books of the Month (January 2017)
- Amazon.com Best Books (2017)
- NPR: Books We Love (2017)
- The Sunday Times Crime Book of the Year
- This Mystery is Amazing! (Foreign – 2018)

== Film adaptation ==
The film rights for The Dry were optioned by producers Bruna Papandrea and Reese Witherspoon in 2015 and the film was produced by Papandrea's production company, Made Up Stories. Eric Bana starred in the lead role of Aaron Falk, with Genevieve O'Reilly as Gretchen and Keir O'Donnell as Raco.

Principal photography began in March 2019 in the Australian state of Victoria, including the Wimmera Mallee region.

The film was due for release on 27 August 2020 but was delayed due to COVID-19. It was released by Roadshow Films in Australia and New Zealand on 1 January 2021 and broke box office records, making it one of the highest grossing Australian film opening weekends ever.
