= Jonetta Kaiser =

American actress

- Born: 10 November 1997 (age 28); Hammond, Louisiana, U. S.
- Occupation: Actress
- Years active: 2019–present

Jonetta Kaiser is an American actress. She is best known for playing Sonya Karp, one of the leads in Vampire Academy.

== Early life ==
Kaiser was born in Hammond, Louisiana. She wanted to become an actress at 14 and searched how to become an actress on Google. She revealed she lived in a low income area. Kaiser is an advocate for mental health and body image positivity, something she personally has struggled with due to her scoliosis.

== Career ==
Kaiser made her on screen debut in one episode of the sitcom Me Time With Frangela. Kaiser's first recurring role was as Kara in the TV series Breakwater. Kaiser landed the biggest role of her career so far when she was cast as Sonya in the fantasy horror Vampire Academy. Kaiser is set to appear in the upcoming thriller The Man Across the Street.

== Personal life ==
In her spare time Kaiser enjoys reading, making jewelry, and taking Pilates classes. She has been working on a couple of AI-based startups with her boyfriend and also building websites for clients.

== Filmography ==
=== Film ===
Year	Title	Role	Notes
2019	The Unauthorized Bash Brothers Experience	Bikini Babe	Short
2019	Pure	Pure	Short
2020	Jane	Rosario	Short
2021	Blue Hour	Mel	Short
2022	Root Letter	Mia	
2022	A Party to Die for	Sadie	
2024	Would You?	Meghan	Short
2024	Killer Nurses	Jade Hewitt	Short

=== Television ===
Year	Title	Role	Notes
2019	Me Time with Frangela	Plaintiff	Episode; Fears and Phobias
2019	Two Sides	Heather	5 episodes
2021	Millenials	Simmi Johnson	2 episodes
2022	Breakwater	Kara	10 episodes
2022	Tales	Amber	Episode: "Put It on Me"
2022	Vampire Academy	Sonya	10 episodes
2025	The Pitt	Chloe	Episode: "5:00 P. M."
