= Rhian Blundell =

British actress

- Born: 31 August 1997 (age 29); Fleetwood, Lancashire, England
- Occupation: Actress
- Years active: 2017–present

Rhian Blundell (born 31 August 1997) is an English actress. On television, she is known for her roles in the Peacock series Vampire Academy (2022) and the ITV series Professor T (2025–).

== Early life ==
Blundell was born in Fleetwood, Lancashire. Her mother was a civil servant while her father was a truck driver. When she was a teen her mother returned to education. Blundell said this helped her confidence in becoming an actress. She attended local church groups and amateur groups to practise her drama. Blundell trained at the Royal Welsh College of Music & Drama.

== Career ==
Blundell made her acting debut in the film, Nobody Girl, directed by David Shillitoe. Blundell was then cast as Isabel in Doctor Who: The Seventh Doctor Adventures. In 2023, Blundell was nominated for a The Stage Debut Awards for her performance in Let the Right One In. Blundell landed the biggest role of her career so far when she was cast as Meredith in the fantasy horror Vampire Academy. Most recently Blundell has been cast as detective Chloe Highsmith in series 4 and 5 of Professor T.

== Personal life ==
In her spare time Blundell loves swimming and gardening, and she calls watching movies her escape.

== Filmography ==
=== Film ===
Year	Title	Role	Notes
2021	Nobody Girl	Jenny	

=== Television ===
Year	Title	Role	Notes
2017	Torchwood	Marta (voice)	Podcast series. Episode: "Corpse Day"
2018	Torchwood: Believe	Erin (voice)	Podcast series.
2018	Doctor Who: The Seventh Doctor Adventures	Isabel (voice)	Podcast series. Episode: "The Dread of Night"
2024	Vampire Academy	Meredith Beckham	8 episodes
2025–2026	Professor T.	DC Chloe Highsmith	Series 4 & 5; 12 episodes
