= Free Times Cafe =

Live music venue and restaurant

- Interactive map of Free Times Cafe
- Location: 320 College Street; Toronto, Ontario, Canada
- Coordinates: 43.657683°N 79.402482°W
- Owner: Judy Perly
- Seating type: restaurant
- Capacity: 50 (back room), 110 (full)
- Type: Restaurant, Café, Bar, Nightclub
- Events: Folk, Jazz, Indie rock

Construction
- Opened: 1980

Website
- Free Times Cafe

The Free Times Cafe is a live music venue and restaurant in Toronto, Ontario, Canada.

The cafe was purchased by Judy Perly in 1980. The restaurant serves a menu of Jewish, Middle Eastern and Canadian food as well as all-day breakfast. The restaurant also has live events nightly available on their calendar at www.freetimescafe.com/enetertainment. Events include live music, comedy, poetry, and book launches. Free Times has featured singer-songwriters and performers such as Ron Sexsmith, Emm Gryner, Sarah Slean, Jack Carty, Keith Jolie, Esthero, The Lemon Bucket Orkestra, Lorne Ryder, Rehan Dalal, Erik Bleich, Jory Nash, Glen Hornblast, Laura Fernandez, Kat Goldman, Jason Fowler and Liam Titcomb. There is an open stage on Tuesday nights. Bob Snider's Live at the Free Times Cafe was recorded at the venue.

Since 1995 the restaurant has offered a buffet styled Jewish brunch known as "Bella! Did Ya Eat?" on Sundays, accompanied by live Klezmer music. The event is named after an amusing incident involving Perly's grandmother. In 2018 a documentary film about Perly and the cafe also titled "Bella! Did Ya Eat?" premiered at the Toronto Jewish Film Festival.
