= The Dry (film) =

2020 Australian mystery drama film

- Australian release poster
- Directed by: Robert Connolly
- Screenplay by: Harry Cripps; Robert Connolly
- Based on: The Dry by Jane Harper
- Produced by: Bruna Papandrea; Steve Hutensky; Jodi Matterson; Robert Connolly; Eric Bana
- Starring: Eric Bana; Genevieve O'Reilly; Keir O'Donnell; John Polson
- Cinematography: Stefan Duscio
- Edited by: Nick Meyers; Alexandre de Franceschi
- Music by: Peter Raeburn
- Production companies: Screen Australia; Film Victoria; Made Up Stories; Arenamedia; Pick Up Truck Pictures
- Distributed by: Roadshow Films
- Release dates: 11 December 2020 (Melbourne); 1 January 2021 (Australia)
- Running time: 117 minutes
- Country: Australia
- Language: English
- Box office: US$17.1 million

The Dry is a 2020 Australian mystery drama thriller film directed by Robert Connolly, from a screenplay by Connolly and Harry Cripps, and is based on the 2016 book of the same name by Jane Harper. The film stars Eric Bana, Genevieve O'Reilly, Keir O'Donnell and John Polson.

The film had its premiere in Melbourne on 11 December 2020, before Roadshow Films released the film in Australia on 1 January 2021, and received positive reviews from critics. IFC Films released the film in the United States on 21 May 2021.

A sequel, Force of Nature: The Dry 2, based on Harper's 2017 book Force of Nature, was released on 8 February 2024.

== Plot ==
Federal agent Aaron Falk returns to his home town of Kiewarra in Victoria to attend the funeral of his childhood friend Luke Hadler, who has allegedly killed his wife Karen and their son Billy before taking his own life. Only their infant daughter, Charlotte, was spared. Luke's parents ask Falk to stay and investigate the crime, and he reluctantly agrees.

In flashbacks, it is revealed that Falk left town twenty years earlier to escape harassment when he was suspected in the death of his girlfriend Ellie. On his return, he finds many of the townspeople are still angry towards him, particularly Ellie's father Mal and her cousin Grant who brand him a liar and a murderer.

With the help of the town's local sergeant Greg Raco, Falk begins to look into the events surrounding Luke's death. They discover that the shotgun shells used in the crime were Remingtons, while Luke only owned Winchesters. Falk also interviews Scott Whitlam, the local school principal and Karen's boss, who explains that although she and Luke had some money trouble, they did not appear to have any serious problems.

Falk discovers the word 'GRANT?' handwritten on the back of a library book receipt. So, he suspects Grant wants to purchase the Hadler family farm as Luke's parents cannot manage it on their own.

Falk visits Gretchen, another childhood friend and Karen's co-worker who tells him about applications found in Karen's desk for school funding. While reminiscing over an old photo album, Falk sees one of Luke holding Gretchen's newborn son Lachlan. He questions her about Luke being the father; Gretchen denies this, but indirectly confirms they were having an affair. Falk directly asks Gretchen if she is responsible for the murders, and she tells him to leave.

The next morning, Falk finds some of the funding applications and realises Karen wrote 'GRANT?' in reference to finances. Falk discovers Whitlam has been embezzling from the school and murdered Karen and her family to cover up his crime.

Falk and Raco go to question Whitlam at the school, only to be told he's left. While visually confirming that his daughter is still in class, they look outside to see him run inside a shed. By the time they reach it, he's gone, but Raco discovers Remington shotgun shells on a shelf. They continue after him into the bush, where he's hiding behind a tree with a jerry can of petrol and a lighter. Whitlam admits to his gambling addiction, stealing money from the school to pay his debts, and murdering the Hadler family to cover up his fraud. He then drenches himself in the petrol and sets himself on fire. Falk and Raco tackle him to the ground and put out the flames, during which there are flashbacks of Whitlam murdering each victim. Whitlam and Raco are badly burnt and hospitalised, although Falk's injuries are not as severe. The investigation is closed with Whitlam's confession, and Luke's parents thank Falk for proving Luke's innocence.

Before leaving town, Falk meets with Gretchen and apologises for accusing her; she forgives him. She reveals she was always in love with Luke but that he chose Karen. She also admits to seeing Ellie walk towards the river on the night she died; she was on her way to see Luke, with whom she spent the night.

Falk visits the rocky area above the river that he and Ellie went to frequently and places a dried bouquet in the same crevice where he accidentally knocked her bracelet off years earlier. He finds her old backpack under some brush nearby, containing her hat, wallet, and journal. Falk opens the journal, finds a photo of the four friends, and reads the last entry, a poem that reveals Ellie's intent to run away due to physical abuse at the hands of her father, following in her mother's footsteps. Mal had also threatened to kill Ellie if she ever tried to leave. A flashback reveals Ellie's last moments and Falk's whereabouts at the time of her death: she hides her backpack, heads to the river where Falk is swimming and calling out her name, changes her mind, and then encounters her father, who pursued her after discovering she'd fled. Falk lets the realization of what happened sink in to the sounds of Mal attacking and drowning Ellie in a rage. Falk takes the backpack as evidence to clear his name, and walks back into town along the riverbed, which is now completely dry.

== Cast ==
- Eric Bana as Aaron Falk
  - Joe Klocek as young Aaron Falk
- Genevieve O'Reilly as Gretchen
  - Claude Scott-Mitchell as young Gretchen
- Keir O'Donnell as Greg Raco
- John Polson as Scott Whitlam
- Bebe Bettencourt as Eleanor "Ellie" Deacon
- Martin Dingle-Wall as Luke Hadler
  - Sam Corlett as young Luke Hadler
- Julia Blake as Barb Hadler
- Bruce Spence as Gerry Hadler
- William Zappa as Mal Deacon
- Matt Nable as Grant Dow
  - Tommy Nable as young Grant Dow
- James Frecheville as Jamie Sullivan
- Jeremy Lindsay Taylor as Erik Falk
- Miranda Tapsell as Rita Raco
- Daniel Frederiksen as Dr. Leigh
- Eddie Baroo as McMurdo
- Renee Lim as Sandra Whitlam
- Rosanna Lockhart as Karen Hadler
- Maude Davey as Helen
- Audrey Moore as Baby Charlotte Hadler
- Jarvis Mitchell as Billy Hadler

Jane Harper, on whose novel the film is based, has a cameo as a funeral attendee.

== Production ==
The film rights for the novel were optioned by producers Bruna Papandrea and Reese Witherspoon in 2015 and was produced by Papandrea's production company, Made Up Stories. Eric Bana starred in the lead role of Aaron Falk, with Genevieve O'Reilly as Gretchen and Keir O'Donnell as Raco.

Principal photography began in March 2019 in the Australian state of Victoria, including the Wimmera Mallee region.

== Release ==
The film was due for release on 27 August 2020 but was delayed due to the COVID-19 pandemic. It had its premiere in Melbourne on 11 December 2020, and was released wide by Roadshow Films in Australia and New Zealand on 1 January 2021.

It was announced on 9 February 2021 that through Cornerstone Films, the film has entered into distribution deals with Leonine for German-speaking Europe, Swift for France, Notorious for Italy and Spain, Selmer Media for Scandinavia, Three Lines for Benelux, M2 Films for Eastern Europe, Terry Steiner International for international airlines and ships, with UK negotiations ongoing at the time.

It was announced on 18 February 2021 that IFC Films acquired the film for distribution in North America, with a release in cinemas and on-demand on 21 May 2021. The film had its North American premiere at the SFFILM Festival on 10 April 2021, and was named one of the must-see films of the festival.

== Reception ==
=== Critical response ===
On the review aggregator website Rotten Tomatoes, 89% of 85 critics gave the film a positive review, with an average rating of 7.3/10. The site's critics consensus reads: "A slow-burning crime drama anchored by a solid central performance from Eric Bana, The Dry offers gripping thrills for genre fans." On Metacritic, the film has a weighted average score of 69 out of 100, based on 23 critics, indicating "generally favorable reviews".

The Guardian gave a positive review, saying "The film remains rock solid throughout: taut, tough and tense, matching wide-open spaces with uncomfortably close drama."

=== Box office ===
The Dry was among the top ten highest-grossing films of 2020 in Australia with A$20.1 million. The film made AU$3.5 million during its opening weekend in Australia, making it one of the highest grossing Australian film opening weekends ever, and the best debut for an Australian-made feature at the country's box office from an independent studio. After five weeks, the film stood at more than A$19 million (US$14.6 million) and had overtaken Muriel's Wedding and The Water Diviner to rank 17th on Australia's all-time top 20, just behind The Adventures of Priscilla, Queen of the Desert. By 23 March, the film had passed A$20 million and was the 14th-highest-grossing Australian film of all time, outpacing The Adventures of Priscilla, Queen of the Desert.

=== Accolades ===
Award	Ceremony date	Category	Subject	Result	Ref
AACTA Awards	8 December 2021	Best Film	Eric Bana	Nominated	
AACTA Awards	8 December 2021	Best Film	Steve Hutensky	Nominated	
AACTA Awards	8 December 2021	Best Film	Jodi Matterson	Nominated	
AACTA Awards	8 December 2021	Best Film	Bruna Papandrea	Nominated	
AACTA Awards	8 December 2021	Best Film	Robert Connolly	Nominated	
AACTA Awards	8 December 2021	Best Direction	Robert Connolly	Nominated	
AACTA Awards	8 December 2021	Best Adapted Screenplay	Robert Connolly	Won	
AACTA Awards	8 December 2021	Best Adapted Screenplay	Harry Cripps	Won	
AACTA Awards	8 December 2021	Best Actor	Eric Bana	Nominated	
AACTA Awards	8 December 2021	Best Actress	Genevieve O'Reilly	Nominated	
AACTA Awards	8 December 2021	Best Supporting Actress	Miranda Tapsell	Nominated	
AACTA Awards	8 December 2021	Best Cinematography	Stefan Duscio	Won	
AACTA Awards	8 December 2021	Best Editing	Alexandre de Franceschi	Nominated	
AACTA Awards	8 December 2021	Best Editing	Nick Meyers	Nominated	
AACTA Awards	8 December 2021	Best Original Music Score	Peter Raeburn	Nominated	
AACTA Awards	8 December 2021	Best Sound	Chris Goodes	Nominated	
AACTA Awards	8 December 2021	Best Costume Design	Cappi Ireland	Nominated	
AACTA Awards	8 December 2021	Best Casting	Jane Norris	Nominated	
AWGIE Awards	7 December 2021	Best Screenplay, Feature Film – Adapted	Robert Connolly and Harry Cripps	Won	

== See also ==
- Cinema of Australia
