= Force of Nature: The Dry 2 =

Australian mystery thriller film

- Theatrical release poster
- Directed by: Robert Connolly
- Screenplay by: Robert Connolly
- Based on: Force of Nature by Jane Harper
- Produced by: Jodi Matterson; Steve Hutensky; Bruna Papandrea; Robert Connolly; Eric Bana
- Starring: Eric Bana; Anna Torv; Deborra-Lee Furness; Robin McLeavy; Sisi Stringer; Lucy Ansell; Jacqueline McKenzie; Tony Briggs; Jeremy Lindsay Taylor; Richard Roxburgh
- Cinematography: Andrew Commis
- Edited by: Alexandre De Franceschi; Maria Papoutsis
- Music by: Peter Raeburn
- Production companies: Screen Australia; Film Victoria; Made Up Stories; Arenamedia; Pick Up Truck Pictures
- Distributed by: Roadshow Films
- Release dates: 21 January 2024 (Melbourne); 8 February 2024 (Australia)
- Running time: 112 minutes
- Country: Australia
- Language: English
- Box office: $5.8 million

Force of Nature: The Dry 2 (titled on-screen as simply Force of Nature) is a 2024 Australian mystery thriller film written and directed by Robert Connolly. The film is a sequel to the 2020 film The Dry and is based on the 2017 novel Force of Nature by Jane Harper. It stars Eric Bana, reprising his role as Aaron Falk, alongside Anna Torv, Deborra-Lee Furness, Robin McLeavy, Sisi Stringer, Lucy Ansell, Jacqueline McKenzie, Tony Briggs, Jeremy Lindsay Taylor and Richard Roxburgh.

The film had its premiere in Melbourne on 21 January 2024. It was released in Australia by Roadshow Films on 8 February 2024.

== Plot ==
Federal police detectives Aaron Falk and Carmen Cooper investigate money laundering facilitated by Daniel Bailey at his firm, Bailey Tennants Finances. They coerce employee Alice Russell to obtain evidence, in return for immunity for her previous embezzlement from the firm.

Alice attends a corporate hiking retreat in the fictional Victorian Giralang Ranges with four other employees: her boss and Daniel's wife, Jill, childhood friend Lauren, and sisters Brianna "Bree" and Bethany "Beth". Three days later, Falk receives an incomprehensible call from Alice. He then learns that only Jill, Lauren, Beth and a spider-bitten Bree have emerged from the wilderness; Alice is missing.

In flashbacks, it is revealed that Falk’s mother also disappeared from the same area during a family hiking trip in his childhood. After searching for several days, Falk and his father found her mortally injured.

Falk questions Alice's hiking partners. They recount how during the hike, the group had become lost. A fight over their only map then caused it to fall into a river. Without the map, the group disagreed over which direction to proceed. Alice intentionally misdirected the group against the consensus opinion, causing further tension. The next day, the group discovered an abandoned cabin. Alice suggested this could have been the base of a notorious serial killer active in the area several decades prior. However, the group dismissed her concerns and voted to spend the night there, where another fight ensued. The next morning, the group was awoken by Bree's cries of pain from a spider bite. Finding Alice missing, they proceeded without her and were rescued from the wilderness.

Using details from their accounts, Falk locates the cabin and finds Alice's corpse a short distance away. However, he also notices next to the corpse a log with a broken spider's web, suggesting Bree had been there. Confronted by Falk, Bree confesses she had stumbled upon Alice's corpse on the morning of her disappearance. Believing Beth was the killer, Bree hid the corpse to protect Beth, who is on probation and cannot afford further legal issues. Bree was bitten by the spider while hiding the corpse.

Falk then notices Lauren and Alice’s daughters bickering nearby. Lauren confesses that on the morning of Alice’s disappearance, she had stumbled upon Alice trying to call Falk. An argument over Alice’s parenting and bullying behavior escalated into a fight, during which Alice suffered a fatal head injury. Believing the injury to be minor, Lauren returns to the cabin, leaving Alice unconscious. Her body was later discovered by Bree.

As Bree and Lauren are escorted away by police, Beth reveals to Falk that before departing for the retreat, she witnessed Alice upload crucial evidence against Daniel onto a USB drive she brought with her. Beth knows where Alice hid the drive, recovers it and hands it to Falk for his investigation into Daniel.

== Cast ==
- Eric Bana as Aaron Falk
  - Archie Thomson as young Aaron Falk
- Anna Torv as Alice Russell
- Deborra-Lee Furness as Jill Bailey
- Robin McLeavy as Lauren
- Sisi Stringer as Bethany "Beth"
- Lucy Ansell as Brianna "Bree"
- Jacqueline McKenzie as Carmen Cooper
- Tony Briggs as Ian Chase
- Jeremy Lindsay Taylor as Erik Falk
- Richard Roxburgh as Daniel Bailey
- Kenneth Radley as Sergeant Vince King
- Ash Ricardo as Jennifer "Jenny" Falk
- Ingrid Torelli as Margot Russell
- Matilda May Pawsey as Rebecca

== Production ==
A sequel to The Dry, based on Jane Harper's 2017 follow-up novel Force of Nature, was announced to be in production in 2022, with principal photography having begun in Victoria in May 2022. Robert Connolly was set to return to direct and Eric Bana would reprise his role as Aaron Falk.

The story was situated in the fictional Giralang Ranges, but the film was shot in Victoria's Otway Ranges, the Dandenongs and Yarra Valley.

In September 2022, it was announced that IFC Films acquired North American distribution rights to the film (after also distributing the first film).

== Release ==
Force of Nature premiered in Melbourne on 21 January 2024.

The film was originally set to be released in Australia on 24 August 2023, but the release was postponed with no new release date set, in solidarity with the 2023 SAG-AFTRA strike in the United States, which would have affected the film's promotion. It was eventually released on 8 February 2024 in Australia.

== Reception ==
The film has a 65% approval rating on review aggregator Rotten Tomatoes, based on 46 reviews, with an average rating of 6.1/10. The website's critics consensus reads, "Generally absorbing from moment to moment despite uneven pacing and a rather convoluted mystery, Force of Nature: The Dry 2 should satisfy fans of the first installment while setting up the third." On Metacritic, the film holds a weighted average score of 58 out of 100 based on seven critics, indicating "mixed or average reviews".
