= André Dae Kim =

Canadian actor and writer

- Kim at the 2026 Toronto International Film Festival
- Born: December 2, 1996 (age 29); Edmonton, Alberta, Canada
- Education: Cawthra Park Secondary School; Sheridan College
- Alma mater: University of Toronto (BA)
- Occupations: Actor, writer
- Years active: 2013–present
- Website: andredaekim.com

André Dae Kim (born December 2, 1996) is a Canadian actor. He is known for his role as Winston Chu in the Canadian television series Degrassi: The Next Generation and Degrassi: Next Class, and as Dylan Edwards in the CBS series Salvation.

== Early life and education ==
Kim was born in Edmonton and grew up in Mississauga where he joined the drama program at Cawthra Park Secondary School. He attended the Mississauga campus of the University of Toronto and Sheridan College's joint theatre and drama studies program.

== Career ==
In 2012, while in grade 10, Kim sent a video audition to producers of Degrassi, which granted him the part of Winston Chu in Degrassi: The Next Generation and then Degrassi: Next Class which premiered in 2016. In 2017, he was nominated for Joey Award for his role in Salvation and for his role in Degrassi: Next Class. Kim was nominated for the Young Entertainer Award in 2017 and 2018 for his role in Degrassi: Next Class.

== Filmography ==
Television and film roles
Year	Title	Role	Notes
2013–2015	Degrassi: The Next Generation	Winston Chu	Main role
2015	Degrassi: Don't Look Back	Winston Chu	Television film
2016–2017	Degrassi: Next Class	Winston Chu	Main role
2017–2018	Salvation	Dylan Edwards	Main role
2018	Schitt's Creek	Teen	
2018	Mary Kills People	Joshua Yang	
2018	In Contempt	Fabian Reyes	
2018	The Detail	Hugo	
2018	Private Eyes	Aubrey	
2019	Samanthology	Yumiko	
2019	American Gods	The Son (1987)	
2019	Hudson & Rex	Toby	School Daze
2019	Northern Rescue	Trevor	4 episodes
2020	Locke & Key	Young Mark Cho	3 episodes
2020	Good Witch	Zack	
2020	The Hardy Boys	Billy	"Of Freedom and Pleasure"
2021	Coroner	Ben	
2022	Vampire Academy	Christian Ozera	Main role
2022	Star Trek: Strange New Worlds	Chief Kyle	8 episodes
2025	SkyMed	Charlie	"Clarity"
2025	Twisted Metal	Chuckie Floop	3 episodes

== Awards and nominations ==
Year	Award	Category	Work	Result
2017	Joey Awards	Best Recurring Principal or Guest Star Actor in a TV Series	Salvation	Nominated
2017	Joey Awards	Best Series Regular or Leading Actor in a TV Series	Degrassi: Next Class	Nominated
2017	Young Entertainer Award	Best Leading Young Actor – Television Series	Degrassi: Next Class	Nominated
2018	Young Entertainer Award	Best Leading Young Actor – Television Series	Degrassi: Next Class	Nominated
