= Jane Harper =

British–Australian author (born 1980)

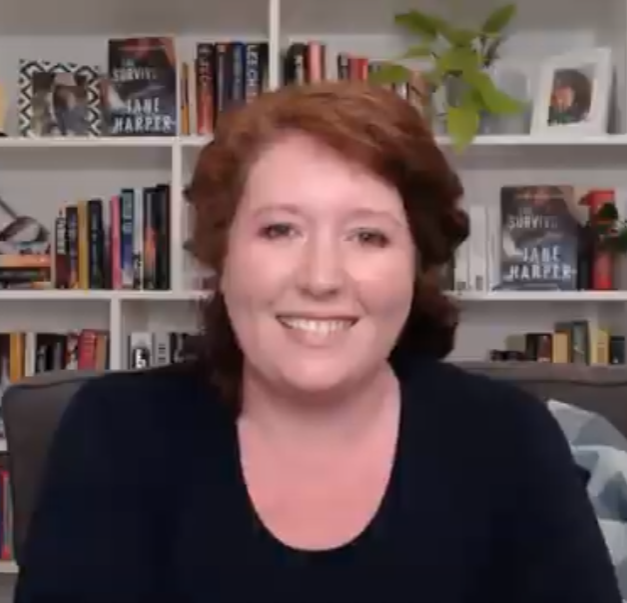
- Harper during an online discussion in 2020
- Born: 1980 (age 45–46); Manchester, England
- Occupation: Author
- Known for: The Dry
- Website: janeharper.com.au

Jane Harper (born 1980) is a British Australian author known for her crime novels, including The Dry, Force of Nature, and The Lost Man, all set in rural Australia.

== Early life and education ==
Born in Manchester, England, Jane Harper moved to Australia with her family when she was eight. The family lived in the outer Melbourne suburb of Boronia for six years, when she acquired Australian citizenship.

As a teen, she returned to the UK with her family and lived in Hampshire. She attended the University of Kent, where she studied English and history.

== Career ==
After completing her degree, Harper gained an entry-level journalism qualification. Her first job was as a trainee at the Darlington & Stockton Times in County Durham, and she later became a senior news journalist at the Hull Daily Mail.

In 2008, she returned to Australia to take up a reporting job at the Geelong Advertiser. In 2011, she joined the staff of the Herald Sun in Melbourne. After working as a print journalist for 13 years, her first novel, The Dry, was published in 2016.

=== The Dry ===
The Dry, Harper's first novel, is a thriller set in a fictional town five hours west of Melbourne. A federal agent, Aaron Falk, returns to his old hometown to attend the funeral of his childhood best friend, Luke. Falk teams up with a local detective and tries to uncover the truth behind Luke's sudden mysterious death, only to find more questions than answers.

=== Force of Nature ===
Harper's second thriller, Force of Nature, is set in the thickly forested mountains north-east of Melbourne, again featuring federal agent Aaron Falk. A group from a Melbourne tech company go on a retreat in the mountains, where Alice Russell, one of the women in the group, disappears while navigating the Mirror Falls trail. Falk had been investigating the company for financial irregularities, and the woman was his secret informer.

=== The Lost Man ===
Harper's third murder mystery, The Lost Man, is set on a large cattle station in South West Queensland. The police find nothing in Cameron Bright's death from dehydration to suggest foul play, but the dead man's older brother Nathan spots irregularities and starts his own informal investigation.

=== The Survivors ===
In Harper's fourth murder mystery, the death of a young woman in a Tasmanian coastal town unearths questions around events during a storm 12 years earlier, during which two men drowned and a girl disappeared.

A TV series of the same name was made by Netflix in 2025.

=== Exiles ===
Exiles is the third and final Aaron Falk mystery. Visiting friends in South Australian wine country, Falk finds himself drawn into the investigation of the disappearance of a woman at the local food and wine festival a year before, and the hit-and-run death of a man a few years earlier.

=== Last One Out ===
Five years after her son Sam disappeared on his 21st birthday, Ro Crowley returns to the declining New South Wales town of Carralon Ridge determined to find out what happened to him.

== Awards and recognition ==
In 2014, The Big Issue published one of Harper's short stories. In the Victorian Premier's Literary Awards in 2015, Harper won an award for the unpublished manuscript of The Dry. In 2017, Harper won the Gold Australian Book Industry Award (ABIA} for Book of the Year, and the Davitt Award for The Dry, and the novel won the Gold Dagger, awarded by the Crime Writers' Association of the United Kingdom, for the best crime novel of the year. Harper became a New York Times best-selling author for The Dry. Reese Witherspoon bought the film rights to the novel and the movie was released in January 2021.

Force of Nature was adapted as a film in 2024 under the title Force of Nature: The Dry 2, with Eric Bana in the lead role of Aaron Falk.

The Lost Man was shortlisted for the 2020 Theakston's Old Peculier Crime Novel of the Year Award, and won the Barry Award for Best Mystery/Crime Novel in 2020.

The Survivors was shortlisted for the general fiction book of the year at the 2021 Australian Book Industry Awards. It was also shortlisted for the 2021 Colin Roderick Award. In 2025, The Survivors was adapted into a Netflix series.

Exiles was shortlisted for the Best Crime Fiction at the 2023 Ned Kelly Awards.

== Personal life ==
Harper married ex-journalist and web developer Peter Strachan in 2015. The couple have two daughters and live in the Melbourne suburb of Elwood.

== Published works ==
Aaron Falk novels

- Harper, Jane (2016). The Dry. Pan Macmillan Australia. ISBN 9781743549995.
- —— (2017). Force of Nature. Pan Macmillan Australia. ISBN 9781743549094.
- —— (2022). Exiles. Pan Macmillan Australia. ISBN 9781760783952.

Standalone novels

- —— (2018). The Lost Man. Pan Macmillan Australia. ISBN 9781743549100.
- —— (2020). The Survivors. Pan Macmillan Australia. ISBN 9781760783945.
- —— (2025). Last One Out. Pan Macmillan Australia. ISBN 9781760783969. (2026 in UK and US)

== Adaptations ==
- The Dry (2020 feature film)
- Force of Nature: The Dry 2 (2024 feature film)
- The Survivors (2025 TV series)
