= Lorne Ryder =

- Born: Lorne MacMillan; 1970 (age 54–55); Mississauga, Ontario, Canada
- Genres: Country; Pop; Blues; Rock
- Occupation(s): Singer-songwriter, multi instrumentalist
- Instrument(s): Keyboard, guitar, blues harmonica, vocals
- Years active: 1985–present

Lorne Ryder (born Lorne MacMillan September 1970 in Mississauga, Ontario) is a Canadian singer-songwriter and multi-instrumentalist. In his thirty six years in the Canadian music scene, he has received three Canadian Country Music Association top-ten nominations for Keyboard Player of the Year, two nominations for Best Country Artist at the Ontario Independent Music Awards, and was nominated for a 2009 Canadian Smooth Jazz Awards for Best Original Composition for his song, "Beautiful Feeling."

== Career ==
=== 80s–90s ===
In 1985, while still at (Cawthra Park Secondary School) Lorne co-founded the all original progressive rock band Revision. Lorne played his first gig at the age of 15 in Etobicoke with Revision co founders guitarist frontman George Sheffield, drummer Leo Di Giovanni and guitarist Rob Sanderson. Lorne has credited Di Giovanni for getting him started in bands. In 1988, Lorne co-founded the band First & Last with his brother Kent (Max Bent) and Ralph Herzig. After a horrific accident Herzig was replaced by drummer Harold Vassell. Later they were joined by Bassist and Songwriter Steve Russell aka Psycopath (Infernal Majesty) and later Manitoba Guitarist Mark Grysiuk. They toured Ontario and Manitoba off and on, as well as produced numerous demos and albums up until 1994. In 1992 First and Last made an 8 song record at Phase One Studios in Toronto with Legendary Producer Bob Gallo (Ben.E.King & George Harrison & Patti LaBelle) engineered by Lenny Derosa(Alice Cooper & The Tragically Hip). In 1993 and 1994, Lorne took a break from the hectic tour life and filled in on keys for Alt-Rock pioneer Purple Joe. He then hit the road as a duo, 2 On Tour, again touring Ontario and Manitoba.

Lorne returned home in 1995 ready to switch gears and with plenty of songs to write. It was then that he started working with Toronto writer and producer Peter Linseman (Angelica Dicastro, Sarina Paris.) In 1998, Lorne received a FACTOR Grant and started production on his debut solo album, Ice Cream And Guns (1999). The album was recorded at Metalworks Studios in Mississauga, Ontario and was co-produced by Lorne, Juno Award-winning engineer L. Stu Young (Prince & David Bowie & Guns N' Roses) and Peter Linseman (KLM Sisters & Carla Sacco). The title track was co-written with Juno Award-winning writer Naoise Sheridan (Ricky Skaggs & Kenny Chesney & Jimmy Rankin.) Three of the singles were featured nationwide on the television show "Up And Coming" produced by the New VR (A-Channel.) The videos were also aired across Canada on CBC television.

=== 2000–2009 ===
After releasing the album, Lorne chose to split his time between promoting his solo material as well as playing in various bands to continue improving his skills. He played with two rhythm and blues cover bands, two tribute bands, and also played keys, harmonica and sang harmonies from 1999 to 2006 for country singer Donna Ferra. It was during his time in Ferra's band he earned 3 CCMA Top-Ten Nominations for Keyboard Player of the Year (2004, 2005, 2006.) Lorne has also recorded and played keys, blues harmonica and sang harmonies for the Max Bent Blues Band since 2003. In 2006 Lorne played keys on "Mistletoe, My Cowboy and Me," by Judy Kanyo. The song spent six weeks at number 1 on the European Country Charts and was nominated for ECMA song of the year.

Lorne continues songwriting and performing at various songwriter clubs, including the C'est What Club and Free Times Cafe in Toronto, and the Broken Spoke and Boardwalk Cafe in Nashville, TN. Many of Lorne's songs he has written with Peter Linseman have been recorded by other artists, most recently by vocalist Angelica Dicastro. Ms. Dicastro's cover of Lorne's song, "Beautiful Feeling," has received airplay across Canada and has been nominated for a 2009 Canadian Smooth Jazz Award for best original composition. Lorne's song "Silverwound Strings," a song he co-wrote with Andrew Mech, has received recognition at both the Billboard Songwriting Contest and the International Songwriting Competition.

In the fall of 2004, Lorne was the music director for a hurricane relief concert, "Canadiana For The Caribbean." The concert was held at the Kool Haus in Toronto, and featured Ronnie Hawkins as the Emcee. The show included performances by Rik Emmett, Barney Bentall and The Good Brothers. Lorne has opened up for artists including Doc Walker, Jason McCoy, The Stampeders and Robert Cray and has shared the stage with Jeff Healey, Ken Moores (front-man from CCR tribute Green River and Windjam), Colorado folk legend Mo Kauffey and Mike Fitzpatrick from the Downchild Blues Band.
