= Force of Nature (novel) =

2017 crime novel by Australian author Jane Harper

- Author: Jane Harper
- Language: English
- Series: Aaron Falk trilogy
- Genre: thriller, mystery
- Publisher: Pan Macmillan
- Publication date: 26 September 2017
- Publication place: Australia
- Media type: Print
- Pages: 377 pp.
- ISBN: 9781760554781
- Preceded by: The Dry
- Followed by: Exiles

Force of Nature is a 2017 thriller novel by Australian author Jane Harper.

This novel is the second in the author's Aaron Falk trilogy, which started with The Dry in 2016, and concluded with Exiles in 2022.

== Synopsis ==
Force of Nature is set in the thickly forested mountains north-east of Melbourne and features Federal Agent Aaron Falk. A group from a Melbourne tech company go on a retreat in the mountains, where Alice Russell, one of the women in the group, disappears while navigating the Mirror Falls trail. Falk has been investigating the company for financial irregularities, and the woman was his secret informer.

== Critical reception ==
Writing in The Guardian, Amanda Coe called the novel "a gripping procedural, with the narrative chops and assured pace of a Hollywood thriller." She noted a number of traits found in the author's earlier works as "Harper deploys end-of-chapter hooks and narrative misdirections with aplomb. But with a style that is efficient at best (people never smile: instead, their mouths always 'lift at the corners'), Force of Nature begs for an internal dynamism. Perhaps Falk is the problem." She did find some difficulties with the overall plot noting that in "The Dry he's personally connected to a story that forced his exile from his hometown. Here, it's strictly business, and given the nature of that business – the clue is in 'financial' – he is more methodical accountant than maverick cop."

In the Chicago Review of Books, Greer MacAllister reviewed the novel positively: "Nearly all of the main characters of Jane Harper's new Australia-set thriller, Force of Nature — a loose follow-up to The Dry — are more unpleasant than pleasant, more misbehaving than misunderstood." The reviewer pointed out that while the novel is only the author's second "it clearly displays her background of more than a decade in journalism. Once the core players are introduced, the novel ramps up to a brisk, compelling pace with red herrings and revelations popping up regularly."

== Publishing history ==
After the novel's initial publication in Australia by Pan Macmillan in 2017, it was reprinted as follows:

- Pan Macmillan, Australia, 2018
- Little, Brown, UK, 2018
- Flatiron Books, USA, 2018
- Pan Macmillan, Australia, 2023

The novel was also translated into Swedish in 2017; Chinese, German, French, Dutch, Danish, Italian, Greek and Croatian in 2018; Norwegian, Hungarian, Spanish, Polish, Japanese, Indonesian, Ukrainian and Czech in 2019; Bulgarian, Finnish, Lithuanian, Russian, Persian, and Romanian in 2020; Portuguese and Latvian in 2021; and Turkish and Arabic in 2022.

== Awards ==
- Davitt Award — Best Adult Crime Novel, 2018, shortlisted
- Davitt Award — People's Choice, 2018, winner
- Australian Booksellers Association Awards — BookPeople Book of the Year, 2018, shortlisted
- Australian Book Industry Awards (ABIA) — Australian General Fiction Book of the Year, 2018, shortlisted
- Indie Book Awards Book of the Year – Fiction, 2018 shortlisted

== Film adaptation ==
The novel was adapted as a film in 2024 under the title Force of Nature: The Dry 2, with Eric Bana in the lead role of Aaron Falk and also featuring Anna Torv and Deborra-Lee Furness. The film was directed by Robert Connolly from his own script.

== See also ==
- 2017 in Australian literature

== Notes ==
- Dedication: "For Pete and Charlotte, with love."
