= Dave Seglins =

Dave Seglins is a Canadian investigative journalist and industry mental health educator and advocate. He has covered domestic and international affairs, policing, government and corporate corruption for many years and has played various hosting roles across CBC Radio (The World at Six, The World This Weekend, fill-in on As It Happens).

More recently, Seglins has worked as a "Well-being Champion" focused on research, training and innovation to support the mental health of news professionals. In 2022, he and research partner Professor Matthew Pearson of Carleton University in Ottawa chronicled high levels of anxiety, depression and trauma exposure when they published Taking Care: A report on mental health, trauma and wellbeing among Canadian media workers, based on a survey of more than 1200 news professionals across Canada.

Seglins is a fellow of the Dart Center for Journalism and Trauma and a member of the Canadian Journalism Forum on Violence in Trauma.

He edits an industry blog "Well-being In News" and moderates the industry Facebook group of Well-being In News & Journalism.
