= Karoline Podolak =

Canadian operatic soprano

- Karolina Podolak
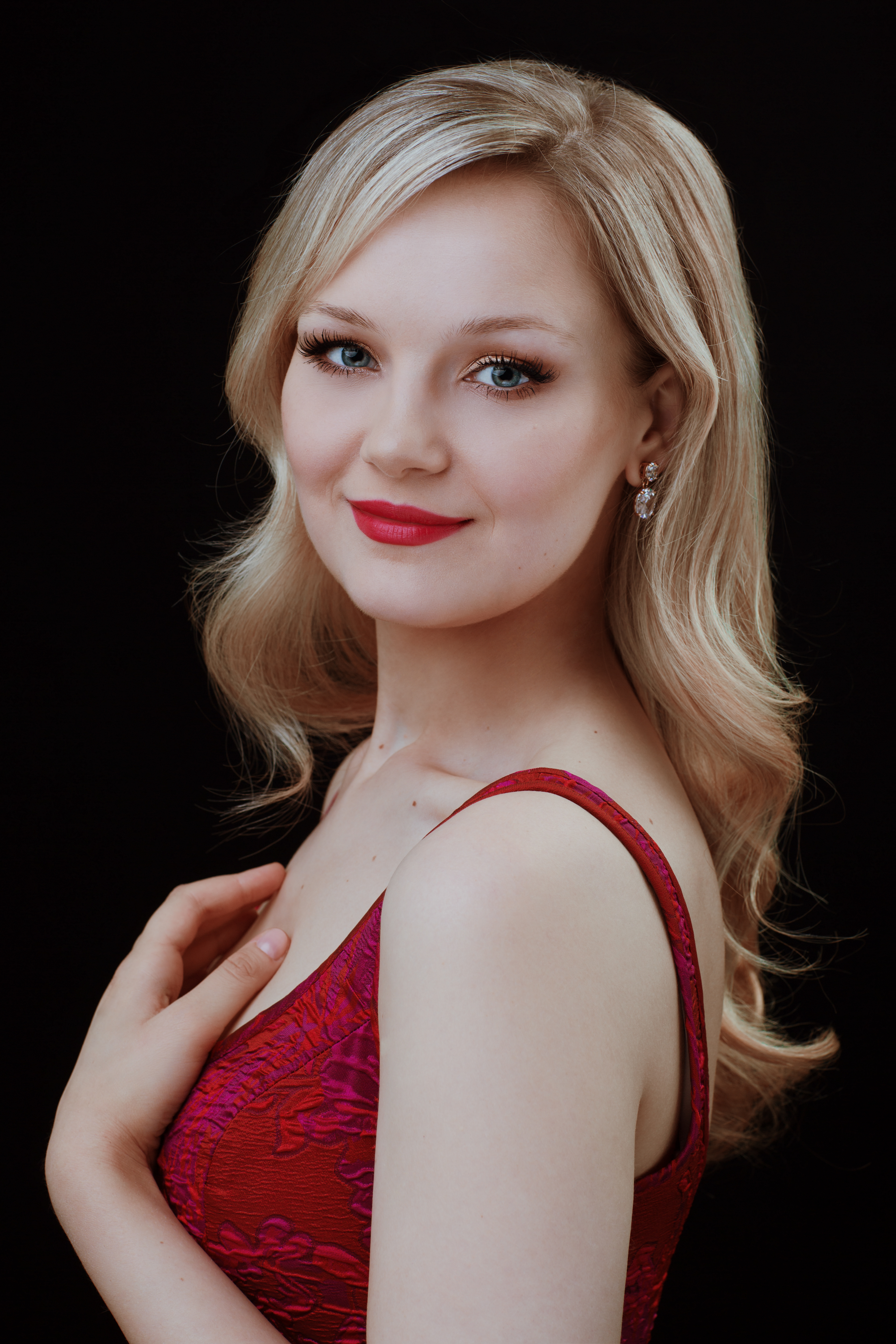
- Karoline Podolak in 2022
- Born: Toronto, Canada
- Occupation: Operatic soprano
- Years active: 2019–present
- Website: www.karolinepodolak.com

Karoline Podolak (Polish: Karolina Podolak) is a Canadian-Polish operatic soprano. She has performed leading roles in European and Canadian opera houses and has won major international voice competitions including the Canadian Opera Company's Ensemble Studio Competition, the Nuits Lyriques International Competition in Marmande, the George and Nora London Foundation Competition, and the Loren L. Zachary National Vocal Competition. She has been formally recognized as a contemporary contributor to Polish culture and heritage.

== Early life and education ==
Podolak was born in Toronto, Canada. An alumna of the Karol Szymanowski Academy of Music in Katowice, Poland, where she completed a Master of Music in Opera Performance, she earlier completed a Bachelor of Arts in Media Production at the RTA School of Media at Ryerson University (now Toronto Metropolitan University). She attended Cawthra Park Secondary School in Mississauga, where she completed an honours Dramatic Arts diploma.

== Career ==
Podolak made her operatic debut in 2019 at the Silesian Opera House in Poland, performing Zuzia in Stanisław Moniuszko's Verbum nobile and Adele in Johann Strauss II's Die Fledermaus.

In 2022 she won First Prize and the Audience Choice Award at the Canadian Opera Company's Centre Stage Ensemble Studio Competition. In 2023 she won the Grand Prix at the Nuits Lyriques International Competition in Marmande, the Grand Prize at the George and Nora London Foundation Competition, the Loren L. Zachary National Vocal Competition, and Third Prize at the Gerda Lissner International Vocal Competition in New York.

She has performed Violetta in Verdi's La traviata as well as Norina in Gaetano Donizetti's Don Pasquale with National Opera and Ballet of Bulgaria.

She has appeared in recital at the Opéra National de Bordeaux in France, and performed Papagena in The Magic Flute at the Daegu Opera House in South Korea.

Podolak has participated in young artist training programs including the Canadian Opera Company's Ensemble Studio and the Atelier lyrique of the Opéra de Montréal.

At the Canadian Opera Company she sang Vixen in Janáček's The Cunning Little Vixen, and at the Opéra de Montréal she performed the roles of Fire, Princess, and Nightingale in Ravel's L'enfant et les sortilèges.

Her concert work includes performances of Mozart's Requiem and Bach's Magnificat with Sing the North, and a recital with the Orchestre classique de Montréal in a program of Polish repertoire.

She has been recognized as a modern contributor to Polish culture and heritage. In 2024, she received the Bronze Cross of Merit from the President of Poland for her contributions to the arts. In 2025, she received the "Outstanding Pole in Canada" recognition from Teraz Polska, awarded to those who contribute in a unique way to the promotion of Poland, Polish culture and values in Canada.

== Repertoire ==
=== Opera ===
Year (debut)	Role	Composer	Piece	Location	Notes
2019	Zuzia	Stanisław Moniuszko	Verbum nobile	Silesian Opera House	
2019	Adele	Johann Strauss II	Die Fledermaus	Silesian Opera House	Polish
2022	Violetta	Giuseppe Verdi	La traviata	National Opera and Ballet of Bulgaria	
2023	Fire / Princess / Nightingale	Maurice Ravel	L'enfant et les sortilèges	Opéra de Montréal	
2024	Vixen	Leoš Janáček	The Cunning Little Vixen	Canadian Opera Company	
2024	Papagena	Wolfgang Amadeus Mozart	The Magic Flute	Daegu Opera House	
2024	Adele	Johann Strauss II	Die Fledermaus	Edmonton Opera	German
2025	Kate Pinkerton	Giacomo Puccini	Madama Butterfly	Canadian Opera Company	
2025	Norina	Gaetano Donizetti	Don Pasquale	National Opera and Ballet of Bulgaria	
2026	Musetta	Giacomo Puccini	La bohème	Brott Opera	

=== Concert ===
Year (debut)	Role	Composer	Piece	Location
2018	Soprano Soloist	Gabriel Fauré	Requiem	Toronto Sinfonietta
2018	Soprano Soloist	Sir Karl Jenkins	The Armed Man: A Mass for Peace	Toronto Sinfonietta
2024	Soprano Soloist	Wolfgang Amadeus Mozart	Requiem	Sing The North Festival
2025	Soprano I Soloist	Johann Sebastian Bach	Magnificat	Sing The North Festival
2025	Soprano Soloist	Johann Sebastian Bach	Cantata No. 137, Lobe den Herren	Sing The North Festival
2026	Soprano Soloist	Joseph Haydn	The Creation	Peterborough Symphony Orchestra

== Honors and awards ==
- First Prize, Romuald Tesarowicz Competition, Grand Theatre, Łódź (2021)
- First Prize & Audience Choice Award, Canadian Opera Company Centre Stage Ensemble Studio Competition (2022)
- Grand Prix, Nuits Lyriques International Competition, Marmande (2023)
- Grand Prize, George and Nora London Foundation Competition (2023)
- Third Prize, Gerda Lissner International Vocal Competition (2023)
- Second Prize, Loren L. Zachary National Vocal Competition (2023)
- Bronze Cross of Merit (Poland), awarded for contributions to the arts (2024)
- First Prize, National Capital Opera Competition (2025)
- Winner, "Outstanding Pole in Canada" Award – Young Pole Category, presented by the Teraz Polska Foundation (2025)

== Critical reception ==
Ludwig van Toronto described her tone as "gleaming, with excellent agility for the treacherous runs … attractive stage presence, not to mention that intangible something called star power."

Rick Perdian in Seen and Heard International praised her "fireworks display of coloratura, trills and bell-like high notes" in Thomas's Mignon.

Opera Canada wrote that she made "a strong impression ... one is struck by the beauty and purity of her lyric soprano, its focused tone, accuracy of pitch, and easy top."

Other reviewers highlighted her "spirited performance ... altogether enchanting" (Voce di Meche), "beautiful and free coloratura" (Ruch Muzyczny), and "remarkable vocal technique" (Revue L'Opéra).
