= Sisi Stringer =

Australian actress

- Born: Sianda Stringer; 10 January 1997 (age 29); Melbourne, Victoria Australia
- Occupation: Actress
- Years active: 2020–present

Sisi Stringer is an Australian actress best known for playing the lead role as Rose Hathaway in Vampire Academy.

== Early life ==
Stringer was born in Byron Bay on 10 January 1997. In 2018, she graduated from Queensland University of Technology where she received a Bachelor degree in Fine Arts for her acting.

== Career ==
Stringer’s acting career started when played the role of Little Inez in a Queensland Performing Arts Centre production of Hairspray when she was 17. Stringer made her on screen debut in the horror film Children of the Corn. Stringer then appeared in the Australian comedy horror Bloody Hell. Stringer’s first big role came when she played Mileena in the new Mortal Kombat film Stringer’s biggest role of her career so far was playing Rose Hathway, the main character in the Peacock television series Vampire Academy. Stringer has most recently starred in the mystery thriller Force of Nature: The Dry 2

== Personal life ==
She was previously in a relationship with actor Joe Klocek.

== Filmography ==
=== Film ===
- Force of Nature: The Dry 2 (2024)
- Vampire Academy (2022)
- Carnifex (2022)
- Mortal Kombat (2021)
- Bloody Hell (2020)
- Children of the Corn (2020)
