= Vampire Academy (TV series) =

American television series

- Genre: Fantasy; Supernatural; Horror
- Based on: Vampire Academy by Richelle Mead
- Developed by: Julie Plec & Marguerite MacIntyre
- Starring: Sisi Stringer; Daniela Nieves; Kieron Moore; André Dae Kim; Anita-Joy Uwajeh; Mia McKenna-Bruce; Jonetta Kaiser; Andrew Liner; Rhian Blundell; J. August Richards
- Music by: Jacob Yoffee & Roahn Hylton
- Country of origin: United States
- Original language: English
- No. of seasons: 1
- No. of episodes: 10

Production
- Executive producers: Julie Plec; Marguerite MacIntyre; Emily Cummins; Jillian DeFrehn; Susan Montford; Don Murphy; Deepak Nayar
- Producers: José Luis Escolar; Cory Kaplan
- Production locations: Spain; Portugal
- Cinematography: Scott Peck; Stefan Ciupek; Cary Lalonde
- Editors: Leon Martin; Gaston Jaren Lopez; Vincent Tabaillon; Larissa James; Nathan Easterling
- Running time: 45–55 minutes
- Production companies: Angry Films Entertainment; Kintop Pictures; My So-Called Company; Big Whoop Productions Inc.; Universal Television

Original release
- Network: Peacock
- Release: September 15 – October 27, 2022

Vampire Academy is an American fantasy horror television series based on the novels series of the same name by Richelle Mead. Adapted for Peacock by Julie Plec and Marguerite MacIntyre, the series is produced by Universal Television. It stars Sisi Stringer, Daniela Nieves, Kieron Moore and André Dae Kim alongside an ensemble cast.

It is the second adaptation of the novel series, after the 2014 film of the same name, and serves as a reboot. Unlike the film, it does not adapt a particular novel of Mead's series, but instead takes the basics, inspirations, and elements from the six novels, using them to tell a different story. It was given a straight-to-series order in May 2021 by Peacock, and casting announcements were made in 2021. The filming took place in Spain and Portugal.

The series takes place in 1997 and features characters from the books and re-imagined versions of others. It revolves around Rose Hathaway who is a guardian-in-training Dhampir, and Lissa Dragomir, who is a Moroi princess, and follows their life and adventures at the St Vladimir's Academy, a boarding school.

The series premiered on September 15, 2022, on Peacock to generally positive reviews. In January 2023, the series was canceled after one season.

== Cast ==
=== Main ===
- Sisi Stringer as Rose Hathaway: a dhampir guardian-in-training; Lissa's best friend; Dimitri's love interest
- Daniela Nieves as Lissa Dragomir: a royal moroi vampire; spirit user; Dragomir princess; Andre's sister; Rose's best friend; Christian's love interest
- Kieron Moore as Dimitri Belikov: a Russian dhampir guardian; head command; Rose's love interest
- André Dae Kim as Christian Ozera: a royal moroi vampire; fire user; Lissa's love interest
- Anita-Joy Uwajeh as Tatiana Vogel: a royal moroi vampire; member of the royal council; political underdog
- Mia McKenna-Bruce as Mia Karp: a non-royal moroi vampire; water user; Victor and Robert's adoptive daughter; Sonya's adoptive sister; Meredith's love interest
- Jonetta Kaiser as Sonya Karp: a non-royal moroi vampire-turned Strigoi; a secret spirit user; Victor and Robert's daughter, Mia's adoptive sister; Mikhail's former girlfriend
- Andrew Liner as Mason Ashford: a dhampir guardian-in-training; Stefan's son; Rose's friend and one-sided love interest
- Rhian Blundell as Meredith Beckham: a dhampir guardian-in-training; Mia's love interest
- J. August Richards as Victor Dashkov: a royal moroi vampire, member of the royal council; key advisor to the queen; Robert's husband; Sonya and Mia's father; Lissa's godfather and legal guardian

=== Recurring ===
- Pik-Sen Lim as Queen Marina: a royal moroi vampire; air user; the 200 year old queen of the Dominion
- Jason Diaz as Andre Dragomir: a royal moroi vampire; fire user; Dragomir prince; the queen's pick to be her successor; Lissa's brother
- Max Parker as Mikhail Tanner: a dhampir guardian; Kieran's son; Sasha's brother; Sonya's former boyfriend
- Jennifer Kirby as Alberta Casey: a dhampir guardian; head of the guardians
- Joseph Ollman as Jesse Zeklos: fire user; a royal moroi vampire; Dane's son
- Yael Belicha as Marie Carter: a royal moroi vampire; earth user; member of the royal council; a traditionalist and conservative
- Amanda Drew as Diane
- Angela Wynter as Irene Vogel: a royal moroi vampire; high priestess; earth user; Tatiana's great aunt
- Craig Stevenson as Dane Zeklos: a royal moroi vampire; air user; member of the royal council; Jesse's cruel and abusive father
- Adam Quintero as Peter Tarus: a royal moroi vampire; member of the royal council
- Blake Patrick Anderson as Eddie Castile: a dhampir guardian-in-training
- Louisa Connolly-Burnham as Silver
- Cornelius Macarthy as Robert Karp: Victor's husband; Sonya and Mia's father

== Episodes ==
| No. | Title | Directed by | Teleplay by | Original release date |
|---|---|---|---|---|
| 1 | "Pilot" | Bille Woodruff | Marguerite MacIntyre & Julie Plec | September 15, 2022 |
| 2 | "Earth. Air. Water. Fire." | Luis Prieto | Linda Ge | September 15, 2022 |
| 3 | "Death Watch" | Luis Prieto | Morenike Balogun-Koch | September 15, 2022 |
| 4 | "Benchmark" | Jesse Warn | Jason Coffey | September 15, 2022 |
| 5 | "Near Guard, Far Guard" | Jesse Warn | Adam Starks | September 22, 2022 |
| 6 | "Molnija" | Erica Dunton | Y. Shireen Razack | September 29, 2022 |
| 7 | "Beyond the Wards" | Erica Dunton | J.J. Braider | October 6, 2022 |
| 8 | "The Trials" | Julie Plec | Noah Diaz | October 13, 2022 |
| 9 | "Darkness" | Geoffrey Wing Shotz | Tawal Panyacosit, Jr & Benjamin O'Hara | October 20, 2022 |
| 10 | "Ascension" | Geoffrey Wing Shotz | Marguerite MacIntyre | October 27, 2022 |

== Production ==
=== Development ===
In 2010, Preger Entertainment optioned the film rights to the Vampire Academy series by Richelle Mead. The film, based on the first book, was released theatrically in United States in February 2014 and was a box-office bomb. Following the movie failure, Preger Entertainment launched a Indiegogo campaign to help fund the production for a sequel based on the second novel, Frostbite. However, the campaign failed to reach its goal and the project was ultimately cancelled.

In March 2015, Julie Plec expressed on Twitter a desire to adapt the books into a television series. In May 2021, Peacock picked up Vampire Academy straight-to-series with Plec and Marguerite MacIntyre as developers and also expected to executive produce alongside Emily Cummins and Jillian DeFrehn, as part of Plec overall deal at Universal Television. Don Murphy, Susan Montford, and Deepak Nayar, who produced the 2014 film, also joined the series as executive producers.

On January 20, 2023, Peacock canceled the series after one season. Though Plec initially announced that they were shopping the series to other platforms, she confirmed in April 2023 that cast contracts had expired, ending chances of a revival.

=== Casting ===
In August 2021, the core cast for the series was set, including Sisi Stringer as Rose Hathaway, Daniela Nieves as Lissa Dragomir, Kieron Moore as Dimitri Belikov, and André Dae Kim as Christian Ozera. J. August Richards, Jonetta Kaiser, and Andrew Liner were cast as Victor Dashkov, Sonya Karp, and Mason Ashford, respectively. Anita-Joy Uwajeh joined the cast as Tatiana Vogel, while Mia McKenna-Bruce signed for the role of Mia Karp, two re-imagined versions of characters from the books, Tatiana Ivashkov, and Mia Rinaldi. Rhian Blundell was announced to play Meredith, a minor characters in the books. In August 2022, Angela Wynter, Lorna Brown, Louisa Connolly-Burnham, Cornelius Macarthy, Jason Diaz, Jennifer Kirby, Joseph Ollman, and Pik-Sen Lim were cast in recurring capacities.

=== Filming ===
Filming had begun in Spain in locations such as Pamplona, Olite, Viana and Zaragoza in September 2021, as revealed by Bille Woodruff, who directed the pilot, and Julie Plec. The series was also filmed in Portugal.

== Release ==
Vampire Academy premiered on Peacock on September 15, 2022.

== Reception ==
The review aggregator website Rotten Tomatoes reported a 77% approval rating with an average rating of 7.4/10, based on 13 critic reviews. Metacritic, which uses a weighted average, assigned a score of 59 out of 100 based on 7 critics, indicating "mixed or average reviews".
