= Golden Reel Award for Outstanding Achievement in Sound Editing – Sound Effects and Foley for Feature Film =

Annual award

- Country: United States
- Presented by: Motion Picture Sound Editors
- Currently held by: Nathan Robitaille, Paul Germann, Scott Hitchon, Craig MacLellan, Dashen Naidoo, Jenna Dalla Riva, Chelsea Body, Goro Koyama, Sandra Fox – Frankenstein (2025)

The Golden Reel Award for Outstanding Achievement in Sound Editing – Sound Effects and Foley for Feature Film is an annual award given by the Motion Picture Sound Editors. It honors sound editors whose work has warranted merit in the field of cinema; in this case, their work in the field of sound effects and Foley. It was first awarded in 1954, for films released the previous year, under the title Best Sound Editing – Feature Film. In 1964 the award was split in two, this to honor sound effects editing, while the other honored ADR. It wasn't until 1974 that the title specified that it was being awarded to sound effects, under the title Best Sound Editing – Sound Effects. The "Foley" of the title wasn't recognized until 1997. Between then and 2018, the category's title fluctuated between similar variations. The award has been given under its current title since 2018.

== Winners and nominees ==
=== 1950s ===
| Year | Film |
|---|---|
| 1953 | Best Sound Editing – Feature Film |
| 1953 | The War of the Worlds |
| 1954 | Them! |
| 1954 | Apache |
| 1954 | Broken Lance |
| 1954 | Carnival Story |
| 1954 | Cease Fire |
| 1954 | Human Desire |
| 1954 | Johnny Dark |
| 1954 | Knights of the Round Table |
| 1955 | This Island Earth |
| 1955 | Green Fire |
| 1955 | It Came From Beneath the Sea |
| 1955 | The Kentuckian |
| 1955 | Lady and the Tramp |
| 1955 | The McConnell Story |
| 1955 | The Racers |
| 1955 | Strategic Air Command |
| 1955 | Underwater |
| 1956 | Earth vs. the Flying Saucers |
| 1956 | Around the World in 80 Days |
| 1956 | Away All Boats |
| 1956 | Bhowani Junction |
| 1956 | The Brave One |
| 1956 | The Conqueror |
| 1956 | Giant |
| 1956 | The Great Locomotive Chase |
| 1956 | The Ten Commandments |
| 1956 | On the Threshold of Space |
| 1957 | The Enemy Below |
| 1957 | 20 Million Miles to Earth |
| 1957 | Battle Hymn |
| 1957 | Bombers B-52 |
| 1957 | Dino |
| 1957 | A Farewell to Arms |
| 1957 | Perri |
| 1957 | The Pride and the Passion |
| 1957 | The Wings of Eagles |
| 1957 | Zero Hour! |
| 1958 | The Defiant Ones |
| 1958 | The Buccaneer |
| 1958 | The Hunters |
| 1958 | The Last Hurrah |
| 1958 | Merry Andrew |
| 1958 | Queen of Outer Space |
| 1958 | The Seventh Voyage of Sinbad |
| 1958 | Tonka |
| 1958 | A Time to Love and a Time to Die |
| 1959 | Ben-Hur |
| 1959 | The Atomic Submarine |
| 1959 | Don't Give Up the Ship |
| 1959 | The FBI Story |
| 1959 | The Horse Soldiers |
| 1959 | It Happened to Jane |
| 1959 | Journey to the Center of the Earth |
| 1959 | Porgy and Bess |
| 1959 | The Shaggy Dog |

=== 1960s ===
| Year | Film |
|---|---|
| 1960 | Spartacus |
| 1960 | The Alamo |
| 1960 | Cimarron |
| 1960 | Exodus |
| 1960 | Hell to Eternity |
| 1960 | The Lost World |
| 1960 | Pepe |
| 1960 | Swiss Family Robinson |
| 1961 | El Cid |
| 1961 | The Absent-Minded Professor |
| 1961 | Atlantis, the Lost Continent |
| 1961 | The Devil at 4 O'Clock |
| 1961 | Flower Drum Song |
| 1961 | Judgment at Nuremberg |
| 1961 | Voyage to the Bottom of the Sea |
| 1962 | Lonely Are the Brave |
| 1962 | Mutiny on the Bounty |
| 1962 | Birdman of Alcatraz |
| 1962 | Hatari! |
| 1962 | Hemingway's Adventures of a Young Man |
| 1962 | The Interns |
| 1962 | Legend of Lobo |
| 1962 | The Manchurian Candidate |
| 1962 | The Music Man |
| 1962 | The Wonderful World of the Brothers Grimm |
| 1963 | How the West Was Won |
| 1963 | Bye Bye Birdie |
| 1963 | A Gathering of Eagles |
| 1963 | The Great Escape |
| 1963 | It's a Mad, Mad, Mad, Mad World |
| 1963 | McLintock! |
| 1963 | Move Over, Darling |
| 1963 | The Prize |
| 1963 | PT 109 |
| 1963 | Savage Sam |
| 1963 | Son of Flubber |
| 1963 | The Ugly American |
| 1963 | The Young Racers |
| 1964 | The Lively Set |
| 1964 | Advance to the Rear |
| 1964 | Cheyenne Autumn |
| 1964 | Fate is the Hunter |
| 1964 | The Outlaws Is Coming |
| 1964 | One Potato, Two Potato |
| 1964 | The Pink Panther |
| 1964 | Robinson Crusoe on Mars |
| 1964 | The Secret Invasion |
| 1965 | The Great Race |
| 1965 | Von Ryan's Express |
| 1965 | Cat Ballou |
| 1965 | Hallelujah Trail |
| 1965 | How to Stuff a Wild Bikini |
| 1965 | A Patch of Blue |
| 1965 | Red Line 7000 |
| 1965 | Saturday Night in Apple Valley |
| 1965 | Shenandoah |
| 1965 | That Darn Cat |
| 1966 | Fantastic Voyage |
| 1966 | Assault on a Queen |
| 1966 | Grand Prix |
| 1966 | Hawaii |
| 1966 | Not With My Wife You Don't |
| 1966 | Out of Sight |
| 1966 | The Professionals |
| 1966 | Wild Angels |
| 1967 | Bonnie and Clyde |
| 1967 | Beach Red |
| 1967 | El Dorado |
| 1967 | Point Blank |
| 1967 | Thoroughly Modern Millie |
| 1967 | The Trip |
| 1968 | Bullitt |
| 1968 | Coogan's Bluff |
| 1968 | Funny Girl |
| 1968 | Head |
| 1968 | Ice Station Zebra |
| 1968 | Project X |
| 1968 | Planet of the Apes |
| 1969 | The Wild Bunch |
| 1969 | The Devil's 8 |
| 1969 | Darby O'Gill and the Little People (Note: The film was originally released in 1959, but re-released in 1969 with re-dubbing and additional audio adjustments made. Although it was eligible for the Oscars in 1959, the MPSE considered it for 1969.) |
| 1969 | A Dream of Kings |
| 1969 | The Gypsy Moths |
| 1969 | Hello, Dolly! |
| 1969 | The Love Bug |
| 1969 | Marooned |
| 1969 | Paint Your Wagon |
| 1969 | The Reivers |
| 1969 | The Undefeated |
| 1969 | Winning |

=== 1970s ===
| Year | Film |
|---|---|
| 1970 | Patton |
| 1970 | Airport |
| 1970 | Darling Lili |
| 1970 | Little Big Man |
| 1970 | The Owl and the Pussycat |
| 1971 | The French Connection |
| 1971 | The Andromeda Strain |
| 1971 | The Bus Is Coming |
| 1971 | Carnal Knowledge |
| 1971 | Dirty Harry |
| 1971 | Dollars |
| 1971 | The Gang That Couldn't Shoot Straight |
| 1971 | Two Lane Blacktop |
| 1971 | Willard |
| 1972 | The Getaway |
| 1972 | Blacula |
| 1972 | Fat City |
| 1972 | Fuzz |
| 1972 | The Godfather |
| 1972 | The Life and Times of Judge Roy Bean |
| 1972 | The Poseidon Adventure |
| 1972 | Skyjacked |

| Year | Film | Winners/Nominees |
|---|---|---|
| 1973 | Best Sound Editing – Sound Effects | |
| 1973 | The Exorcist | James Nelson, Fred J. Brown, Ross Taylor |
| 1973 | Charley Varrick | |
| 1973 | Day of the Dolphin | |
| 1973 | Electra Glide in Blue | |
| 1973 | Jonathan Livingston Seagull | |
| 1973 | Magnum Force | |
| 1973 | The Paper Chase | |
| 1973 | White Lightning | |
| 1974 | Freebie and the Bean | James Nelson, Sam F. Shaw |
| 1974 | Black Belt Jones | |
| 1974 | Blazing Saddles | |
| 1974 | Dirty Mary, Crazy Larry | |
| 1974 | Earthquake | |
| 1974 | For Pete's Sake | |
| 1974 | The Godfather Part II | |
| 1974 | The Towering Inferno | |
| 1975 | Three Days of the Condor | |
| 1975 | Jaws | |
| 1975 | Cleopatra Jones and the Casino of Gold | |
| 1975 | Framed | |
| 1975 | The Hiding Place | |
| 1975 | Bite the Bullet | |
| 1975 | Lucky Lady | |
| 1975 | Rollerball | |
| 1977 | Close Encounters of the Third Kind | |
| 1977 | Star Wars | |
| 1977 | Black Sunday | |
| 1977 | Damnation Alley | |
| 1977 | The Deep | |
| 1977 | Mr. Billion | |
| 1977 | Slap Shot | |
| 1977 | Sorcerer | |
| 1977 | Airport '77 | |
1978
| 1978 | The Big Fix | |
| 1978 | Convoy | |
| 1978 | Every Which Way But Loose | |
| 1978 | Foul Play | |
| 1978 | Grey Lady Down | |
| 1978 | Hooper | |
| 1978 | Jaws 2 | |
| 1978 | Paradise Alley | |
| 1978 | The Swarm | |
| 1979 | The Black Stallion | Alan Splet, Ann Kroeber, Todd Boekelheide |
| 1979 | 1941 | |
| 1979 | Star Trek: The Motion Picture | |
| 1979 | Beyond the Poseidon Adventure | |
| 1979 | Apocalypse Now | |
| 1979 | The China Syndrome | |
| 1979 | The Electric Horseman | |
| 1979 | Ice Castles | |
| 1979 | Norma Rae | |
| 1979 | The Black Hole | |

=== 1980s ===
| Year | Film | Winners/Nominees |
|---|---|---|
| 1980 | The Blues Brothers | John Stacey (supervising sound editor); Bob Bradshaw, Mike Wilhoit, Bryan Courcier, Don Tomlinson, Wes Wolfe, Billie Owens, Art Pullen, Walt Jenevein, Roger Sword, Jeff Sandler, Glen Hoskinson (sound effects editors) |
| 1980 | Airplane | |
| 1980 | The Empire Strikes Back | |
| 1980 | Below the Belt | |
| 1980 | The Competition | |
| 1980 | Altered States | |
| 1980 | Gloria | |
| 1980 | The Hunter | |
| 1980 | The Long Riders | |
| 1980 | Stir Crazy | |
| 1980 | The Stunt Man | |
| 1980 | Urban Cowboy | |
| 1981 | Raiders of the Lost Ark | Ben Burtt, Richard L. Anderson |
| 1981 | Wolfen | |
| 1981 | Chariots of Fire | |
| 1981 | Cheech and Chong's Next Movie | |
| 1981 | Heartbeeps | |
| 1981 | Modern Problems | |
| 1981 | Reds | |
| 1981 | Sharky's Machine | |
| 1981 | Sphinx | |
| 1981 | Stripes | |
| 1981 | Thief | |
| 1981 | Time Bandits | |
| 1982 | E.T. the Extra-Terrestrial | Charles L. Campbell, David A. Pettijohn, Louis L. Edmann, Richard C. Franklin, Jr., Samuel C. Crutcher, Donald Di Girolamo, Robert Glass, Robert "Buzz" Knudson |
| 1982 | Star Trek II: The Wrath of Khan | |
| 1982 | Conan the Barbarian | |
| 1982 | First Blood | |
| 1982 | Firefox | |
| 1982 | Personal Best | |
| 1982 | Poltergeist | |
| 1982 | Six Pack | |
| 1982 | 48 Hrs. | |
| 1982 | Tron | |
| 1983 | Never Cry Wolf | Alan Splet, Robert Shoup, Teresa Eckton |
| 1983 | Return of the Jedi | |
| 1983 | Cujo | |
| 1983 | The Dead Zone | |
| 1983 | Heart Like a Wheel | |
| 1983 | Blue Thunder | |
| 1983 | The Right Stuff | |
| 1983 | Scarface | Maurice Schell |
| 1983 | Sudden Impact | |
| 1983 | Uncommon Valor | |
| 1983 | Under Fire | |
| 1983 | WarGames | |
| 1984 | Places in the Heart | Richard P. Cirincione, Maurice Schell |
| 1984 | The River | Kay Rose |
| 1984 | 2010: The Year We Make Contact | Richard L. Anderson, Dale Strumpelli |
| 1984 | Indiana Jones and the Temple of Doom | Ben Burtt |
| 1984 | Star Trek III: The Search for Spock | George Watters II, Cecelia Hall |
| 1984 | Beverly Hills Cop | George Watters II, Cecelia Hall |
| 1984 | The Cotton Club | Maurice Schell |
| 1984 | Dune | Alan Splett, Les Wiggans |
| 1984 | Ghostbusters | Tom McCarthy Jr. |
| 1984 | Gremlins | Richard L. Anderson |
| 1984 | The Adventures of Buckaroo Banzai Across the 8th Dimension | Gordon Ecker |
| 1984 | The Last Starfighter | Fred J. Brown |
| 1984 | The Karate Kid | Norvald Crutcher, Samuel Crutcher |
| 1984 | Romancing the Stone | Charles L. Campbell |
| 1984 | Amadeus | B.H. Sears |
| 1984 | Streets of Fire | Stephen Hunter Flick |
| 1985 | Ladyhawke | Alan Robert Murray, Robert G. Henderson |
| 1985 | Back to the Future | |
| 1985 | Cocoon | |
| 1985 | The Color Purple | |
| 1985 | Explorers | |
| 1985 | Out of Africa | |
| 1985 | Rambo: First Blood Part II | |
| 1985 | Silverado | |
| 1985 | To Live and Die in L.A. | |
| 1985 | Weird Science | |
| 1985 | Witness | |
| 1985 | Year of the Dragon | |
| 1986 | Top Gun | |
| 1986 | Batteries Not Included | |
| 1986 | Star Trek IV: The Voyage Home | |
| 1986 | Cobra | |
| 1986 | Heartbreak Ridge | |
| 1986 | The Hitcher | |
| 1986 | The Karate Kid Part II | |
| 1986 | The Mosquito Coast | |
| 1986 | Platoon | |
| 1986 | Salvador | |
| 1986 | Blue Velvet | |
| 1986 | Where the River Runs Black | |
| 1987 | Predator | Richard Shorr |
| 1987 | Batteries Not Included | |
| 1987 | Beverly Hills Cop 2 | |
| 1987 | Empire of the Sun | |
| 1987 | Fatal Attraction | |
| 1987 | Innerspace | |
| 1987 | Lethal Weapon | |
| 1987 | Masters of the Universe | |
| 1987 | The Princess Bride | |
| 1987 | RoboCop | |
| 1987 | The Running Man | |
| 1987 | The Untouchables | |
| 1987 | The Witches of Eastwick | |
| 1988 | Die Hard | Richard Shorr |
| 1988 | Beetlejuice | |
| 1988 | Willow | |
| 1988 | Tucker: The Man and His Dream | |
| 1988 | Distant Thunder | |
| 1988 | The Presidio | |
| 1988 | Red Heat | |
| 1988 | Crocodile Dundee 2 | |
| 1988 | Who Framed Roger Rabbit | |
| 1988 | Colors | |
| 1988 | Young Guns | Mark R. La Pointe |
| 1989 | The Abyss | Dody Dorn, Blake Leyh |
| 1989 | Born on the Fourth of July | Wylie Stateman, Michael Minkler |
| 1989 | Back to the Future Part II | |
| 1989 | Indiana Jones and the Last Crusade | |
| 1989 | Star Trek V: The Final Frontier | |
| 1989 | Glory | |
| 1989 | Harlem Nights | |
| 1989 | Black Rain | |
| 1989 | Lethal Weapon 2 | |
| 1989 | The Package | |
| 1989 | Casualties of War | |

=== 1990s ===
| Year | Film | Winners/Nominees |
|---|---|---|
| 1990 | Total Recall | |
| 1990 | Dances with Wolves | |
| 1990 | Days of Thunder | |
| 1990 | Die Hard 2 | |
| 1990 | Ghost | |
| 1990 | The Godfather Part III | |
| 1990 | Gremlins 2: The New Batch | |
| 1990 | The Hunt for Red October | |
| 1990 | Jacob's Ladder | |
| 1990 | Miller's Crossing | |
| 1990 | RoboCop 2 | |
| 1991 | Barton Fink | |
| 1991 | Terminator 2: Judgment Day | Gary Rydstrom (supervising sound editor/sound designer/re-recording mixer); Gloria S. Borders (supervising sound editor); Tim Holland, Teresa Eckton, Richard Hymns, Ethan Van der Ryn, Tom Myers, Robert Shoup, Ken Fischer, Larry Oatfield (sound effects editors); Marion Wilde, Diana Pellegrini, Sandina Bailo-Lape (Foley editors); Dennie Thorpe (Foley artist) |
| 1991 | Backdraft | Gary Rydstrom (supervising sound editor/sound designer/re-recording mixer); Richard Hymns (supervising sound editor); Frank E. Eulner, Tim Holland, Ken Fischer (sound effects editors); Mary Helen Leasman, Diana Pellgrini, Sandina Bailo-Lape (Foley editors); Dennie Thorpe, Marine Moore (Foley artists) |
| 1991 | JFK | |
| 1991 | Robin Hood: Prince of Thieves | |
| 1991 | The Rocketeer | |
| 1991 | Star Trek VI: The Undiscovered Country | |
| 1991 | The Addams Family | |
| 1992 | Under Siege | John Leveque, Bruce Stambler (supervising sound editors/sound designers); Scott D. Jackson (supervising Foley editor); Becky Sullivan (supervising ADR editor); Richard Burton, Robert Bradshaw, Clayton Collins, Bruce Fortune, Hector C. Gika, Glenn Hoskinson, Williams Jacobs, Frank Kniest, John Kwiatkowski, Kimberly Ellen Lowe, Jay Nierenberg, Kim Secrist, Shawn Sykora, Donald L. Warner Jr., Richard E. Yawn (sound effects editors) |
| 1992 | Alien 3 | |
| 1992 | Batman Returns | |
| 1992 | Bram Stoker's Dracula | |
| 1992 | The Last of the Mohicans | |
| 1992 | Lethal Weapon 3 | |
| 1992 | Patriot Games | |
| 1992 | A River Runs Through it | |
| 1992 | Sneakers | |
| 1992 | Unforgiven | |
| 1993 | Jurassic Park | Gary Rydstrom (supervising sound editor/sound designer/re-recording mixer); Richard Hymns (supervising sound editor); Christopher Boyes, Ken Fischer, Tim Holland, Terry Eckton (sound effects editors); Sandina Bailo-Lape, Mary Helen Leasman (Foley editors); Dennie Thorpe, Marine Moore (Foley artists) |
| 1993 | Cliffhanger | Wylie Stateman, Gregory Baxter (supervising sound editors) |
| 1993 | Demolition Man | Robert G. Henderson (supervising sound editor) |
| 1993 | The Fugitive | John Leveque, Bruce Stambler (supervising sound editors/sound designers); John P. Fasal (sound designer); Patrick Bietz, Lance Brown, Michael Dressel, Sam Gemette, Hector C. Gika, Glenn Hoskinson, Victor Iorillo, Frank Kniest, Anthony Milch, Jay Nierenberg, Steve Schwalbe, Greg Stacy, Shawn Sykora, Donald L. Warner Jr., Marshall Winn (sound effects editors) |
| 1993 | Geronimo: An American Legend | Jay Wilkinson (supervising sound editor) |
| 1993 | Gettysburg | Bruce Nazarian, J. Stanley Johnson (supervising sound editors) |
| 1993 | Hard Target | John Dunn, George E. Simpson (supervising sound editors) |
| 1993 | In the Line of Fire | Wylie Stateman, Gregory Baxter (supervising sound editors) |
| 1993 | Posse | Bruce Stambler (supervising sound editor); Shawn Sykora (supervising Foley editor); Lance Brown, Anthony Milch, Jay Nierenberg, Richard E. Yawn (sound effects editors) |
| 1993 | Searching for Bobby Fischer | Elizabeth Sterner (supervising sound editor) |
| 1993 | The Three Musketeers | Tim Chau, Richard Franklin Jr. (supervising sound editors) |
| 1994 | Speed | Stephen Hunter Flick (supervising sound editor/sound designer); David Bartlett, Paul Berolzheimer, Dean Beville, John T. Cucci, Ken Dufva, Donald Flick, Judee Flick, Avram D. Gold, Warren Hamilton Jr., Greg Hedgepath, Patricio A. Libenson, Dean G. Manly, Dan O'Connell, Eric Potter, Catherine Rowe, Joan Rowe, Kirk Schuler, Solange S. Schwalbe, David E. Stone, Bruce Stubblefield (sound effects editors) |
| 1994 | Clear and Present Danger | John Leveque, Bruce Stambler (supervising sound editors/sound designers); Lance Brown (sound designer); Pamela Bentkowski (supervising Foley editor); Glenn Hoskinson, Frank Howard, Steve Mann, Jay Nierenberg, Jeffrey L. Sandler, David E. Stone, Donald L. Warner Jr. (sound effects editors); Christine Danelski, Jeffrey R. Payne (Foley editors) |
| 1994 | Forrest Gump | Randy Thom (supervising sound editor/sound designer/re-recording mixer); Gloria S. Borders (supervising sound editor); Dennie Thorpe, Jana Vance (Foley artists); Marian Wilde, Karen Harding (Foley editors); Pat Jackson, David E. Turner (sound effects editors) |
| 1994 | Star Trek: Generations | |
| 1994 | Pulp Fiction | |
| 1994 | Natural Born Killers | |
| 1994 | Stargate | |
| 1994 | True Lies | |
| 1994 | The War | |
| 1994 | Wyatt Earp | |
| 1995 | Braveheart | Lon Bender, Per Hallberg (supervising sound editors/sound designers) |
| 1995 | Crimson Tide | George Watters II (supervising sound editor/sound designer) |
| 1995 | Apollo 13 | |
| 1995 | Batman Forever | |
| 1995 | Die Hard with a Vengeance | |
| 1995 | First Knight | |
| 1995 | Jumanji | |
| 1995 | Rob Roy | |
| 1995 | Sense and Sensibility | |
| 1995 | Se7en | |
| 1995 | Under Siege 2: Dark Territory | |
| 1995 | Waterworld | |
| 1996 | Daylight | Richard L. Anderson (supervising sound editor/sound designer); David A. Whittaker (supervising sound editor); Jeffrey Kaplan (sound effects editor) |
| 1996 | Broken Arrow | George Watters II (supervising sound editor/sound designer); Victoria Martin (supervising Foley editor); Christopher Boyes, John P. Fasal (additional sound designers) |
| 1996 | Courage Under Fire | Per Hallberg (supervising sound editor/sound designer), Lon Bender (sound designer); Scott Martin Gershin (sound effects editor) |
| 1996 | Dragonheart | Richard L. Anderson (supervising sound editor) |
| 1996 | The English Patient | Pat Jackson (supervising sound editor); Kyrsten Mate, Douglas Murray, Jennifer L. Ware (sound effects editors) |
| 1996 | Eraser | Bub Asman, Alan Robert Murray (supervising sound editors/sound designers); Christopher Boyes (additional sound designer); Christopher Flick (supervising Foley editor); Christopher S. Aud, Patrick Bietz, John Bonds, Neil Burrow, Samuel C. Crutcher, Mike Dobie, Doug Jackson, James J. Klinger, Gary Krivacek, Walter Newman, Jayme S. Parker (sound effects editors) |
| 1996 | Executive Decision | Robert G. Henderson, David M. Horton (supervising sound editors); David L. Horton Jr. (supervising Foley editor) |
| 1996 | The Ghost and the Darkness | Bruce Stambler (supervising sound editor/sound designer); Lance Brown (sound designer/sound effects editor); Michael Dressel (supervising Foley editor); Gordon Ecker, Glenn Hoskinson, Steve Mann, Gary Mundheim, Steve Nelson, Kim Secrist, Donald L. Warner Jr., Richard E. Yawn (sound effects editors) |
| 1996 | Independence Day | Val Kuklowsky, Mark A. Lanza (supervising sound editors); Bill W. Benton, Mark A. Lanza (sound designers) |
| 1996 | Mission: Impossible | Christopher Boyes, Tom Bellfort (supervising sound editors/sound designers); Jon P. Fasal (additional sound designer) ; Vic Radulich (Supervising Foley Editor) |
| 1996 | The Rock | George Watters II (supervising sound editor/sound designer) Victoria Martin (supervising Foley editor/Foley artist), John P. Fasal (sound effects editor) |
| 1996 | Star Trek: First Contact | Cameron Frankley, James Wolvington (supervising sound editors); Pamela Bentkowski (supervising Foley editor); Jeff Clark, Scott G.G. Haller, Doug Jackson, David F. Van Slyke (sound effects editors) |
| 1996 | Twister | Stephen Hunter Flick (supervising sound editor); Charles Maynes (Foley editor/sound designer/sound effects editor); Ken J. Johnson, Martin Lopez, Eric Potter, John Pospisol (special sound designers) |
| 1997 | Best Sound Editing – Sound Effects & Foley | |
| 1997 | James Cameron's Titanic | Christopher Boyes (supervising sound editor/sound designer/re-recording mixer); Tom Bellfort (supervising sound editor); Thomas W. Small (supervising Foley editor); Scott Guitteau, Shannon Mills, Christopher Scarabosio, Ethan Van der Ryn (sound effects editors); Scott Curtis, Michael Dressel, Tammy Fearing, David L. Horton Jr. (Foley editors) |
| 1997 | Contact | Randy Thom (supervising sound editor/sound designer/re-recording mixer); Phill Benson (supervising sound editor); Steve Boeddeker, Teresa Eckton, Douglas Murray, Marian Wilde (sound effects editors); Bruce Lacey, Mary Helen Leaseman, Sara Bolder (Foley editors); Dennie Thorpe, Catherine Haper (Foley artists) |
| 1997 | Con Air | |
| 1997 | Face/Off | |
| 1997 | The Fifth Element | |
| 1997 | L.A. Confidential | |
| 1997 | Men in Black (MIB) | |
| 1997 | Rosewood | |
| 1997 | Starship Troopers | |
| 1998 | Saving Private Ryan | Gary Rydstrom (supervising sound editor/sound designer/re-recording mixer); Richard Hymns (supervising sound editor); Sandina Bailo-Lape (supervising Foley editor); Teresa Eckton, Frank E. Eulner, Larry Oatfield, Ethan Van der Ryn, Karen G. Wilson (sound effects editors); Bruce Lacey (Foley editor) |
| 1998 | Armageddon | |
| 1998 | Blade | |
| 1998 | Deep Impact | |
| 1998 | Enemy of the State | |
| 1998 | Godzilla | |
| 1998 | Lethal Weapon 4 | |
| 1998 | The Mask of Zorro | |
| 1998 | The Negotiator | |
| 1998 | Ronin | |
| 1998 | The X-Files | |
| 1999 | The Matrix | Dane A. Davis (supervising sound editor/sound designer); Eric Lindemann (sound designer/sound effects editor); Thom Brennan (supervising Foley editor); Susan Dudeck, Julia Evershade, David Grimaldi (sound effects editors); Valerie Davidson (Foley editor); Hilda Hodges, John Roesch (Foley artists); Nancy Barker, Barbara Delpuech, Frank Long, Noel McIntosh, David McRell (assistant sound effects editors); Carolyn Tapp (Foley recordist); Mary Jo Lang (Foley mixer) |
| 1999 | End of Days | Kelly Oxford, Michael D. Wilhoit (supervising sound editors); Chris Hogan (supervising Foley editor); Tony Lamberti, Alan Rankin (sound designers); Christopher Assells, Kerry Carmean-Williams, Scott Martin Gershin, Hector C. Gika, Scott Sanders (sound effects editors); Craig S. Jaeger (Foley editor) |
| 1999 | Fight Club | Ren Klyce (supervising sound editor/sound designer); Richard Hymns (supervising sound editor); Malcolm Fife (supervising Foley editor); Lindakay Brown, Steve Boeddeker, David C. Hughes, Kyrsten Mate, Larry Oatfield (sound effects editors) |
| 1999 | The Green Mile | Mark Mangini (supervising sound editor); Aaron Glascock (supervising Foley editor); Howell Gibbens, David E. Stone (sound effects editors); Solange S. Schwalbe (Foley editor) |
| 1999 | Inspector Gadget | Lon Bender (supervising sound editor); Craig S. Jaeger (supervising Foley editor); Christopher Assells, Scott Martin Gershin, Dan Hegeman, Philip A. Hess, Randy Kelley, Michael Regan, Frank Smathers, Jon Title (sound effects editors) |
| 1999 | The Mummy | Leslie Shatz (supervising sound editor); Jonathan Klein (supervising Foley editor); Richard Burton (sound effects editor); Thom Brennan (sound effects/Foley editor); Mark Pappas (Foley editor) |
| 1999 | Sleepy Hollow | Skip Lievsay (supervising sound editor); Thomas W. Small (supervising Foley editor); Richard L. Anderson, Craig Berkey, Sean Garnhart, Lewis Goldstein, John Pospisil, Paul Urmson (sound effects editors); Scott Curtis, Michael Dressel, Tammy Fearing, Matthew Harrison (Foley editors) |
| 1999 | Star Wars: Episode I – The Phantom Menace | Ben Burtt (supervising sound editor/sound designer); Matthew Wood, Tom Bellfort (supervising sound editors); Teresa Eckton, Christopher Scarabosio (sound effects editors); Bruce Lacey, Marian Wilde (Foley editors) |
| 1999 | Three Kings | Bruce Fortune, John Leveque (supervising sound editors); Shawn Sykora (supervising Foley editor); Gary Blufer, Steve Mann, Anthony Milch, Terry Rodman, Aaron D. Weisblatt, Richard E. Yawn (sound effects editors); Bob Beher, Michael Dressel (Foley editors) |

=== 2000s ===
| Year | Film | Winners/Nominees |
|---|---|---|
| 2000 | Best Sound Editing – Sound Effects & Foley, Domestic Feature Film | |
| 2000 | Gladiator | Per Hallberg (supervising sound editor/sound designer); Craig S. Jaeger (supervising Foley editor); Christopher Assells, Dino Dimuro, Richard Dwan Jr., Scott Martin Gershin, Dan Hegeman, Randy Kelley, Lou Kleinman, Mark P. Stoeckinger, Jon Title (sound effects editors) |
| 2000 | Cast Away | Randy Thom (supervising sound editor/sound designer/re-recording mixer); Dennis Leonard (supervising sound editor); Sue Fox, Andrea Gard (supervising Foley editors); Ken Fischer, David C. Hughes, Stephen Kearney (sound effects editors) |
| 2000 | Crouching Tiger, Hidden Dragon | Eugene Gearty (supervising sound editor); Will Ralston (supervising Foley editor); Benjamin Cheah, Blake Leyh (sound effects editors) |
| 2000 | Gone in 60 Seconds | George Watters II (supervising sound editor/sound designer); Victoria Martin (supervising Foley editor); David A. Arnold, Suhail Kafity, Adam Kopald, F. Hudson Miller, Piero Mura, R.J. Palmer, Todd Toon, Gary Wright (sound effects editors); Fred Burke, Matthew Harrison, James Likowski (Foley editors) |
| 2000 | Mission: Impossible 2 | Mark P. Stoeckinger (supervising sound editor/sound designer); Thomas W. Small (supervising Foley editor); Bryan Bowen, Tony Lamberti, Alan Rankin, Geoffrey G. Rubay, Scott Wolf (sound effects editors); Scott Curtis, Dino Dimuro, Tammy Fearing, Glenn T. Morgan (Foley editors) |
| 2000 | The Patriot | Per Hallberg (supervising sound editor/sound designer); Craig S. Jaeger (supervising Foley editor); Christopher Assells, David Baldwin, Harry Cohen, Dino Dimuro, Dan Hegeman, Paul Jyrälä, Randy Kelley, Lou Kleinman, Scott Sanders, Peter Staubli (sound effects editors) |
| 2000 | The Perfect Storm | Wylie Stateman (supervising sound editor/sound designer); Kelly Cabral (supervising sound editor); Stu Bernstein, Kerry Carmean-Williams, Valerie Davidson, Scott Martin Gershin, Hector C. Gika, Randy Kelley, Scott Sanders, Jon Title, Wade Wilson (sound effects editors) |
| 2000 | Space Cowboys | Bub Asman, Alan Robert Murray (supervising sound editors); Michael Dressel (supervising Foley editor); Christopher Boyes, Phil Benson, Teresa Eckton, David Farmer, Ken Fischer, Glenn Hoskinson, Jason King, Gary Krivacek, Steve Mann, Anthony Milch, Howard Neiman (sound effects editors) |
| 2000 | U-571 | Jon Johnson (supervising sound editor); Miguel Rivera (supervising Foley editor); Keith Bilderbeck, Tim Gedemer, Sandy Gendler, Brian W. Jennings, Charles Maynes, Angelo Palazzo, Guy Tsujimoto (sound effects editors); Bruce Stubblefield, Donald Sylvester (Foley editors) |
| 2000 | X-Men | John A. Larsen (supervising sound editor); John Morris (supervising Foley editor); Craig Berkey, Steve Boeddeker, Beau Borders, Gary Rydstrom, Richard Burton, David C. Hughes, Ethan Van der Ryn, Jay Wilkinson (sound effects editors); Andy Kopetzky (Foley editor) |
| 2001 | Black Hawk Down | Per Hallberg, Karen Baker Landers (supervising sound editors/sound designers); Craig S. Jaeger (supervising Foley editor); Christopher Assells, Dino Dimuro, Gregory Hainer, Dan Hegeman, Michael Hertlein, Michael A. Reagan, Perry Robertson, Solange S. Schwalbe, Peter Staubli, Bruce Tanis, Jon Title (sound effects editors) |
| 2001 | A.I. Artificial Intelligence | Gary Rydstrom (supervising sound editor/sound designer/re-recording mixer); Richard Hymns (supervising sound editor); Al Nelson, Christopher Scarabosio, Teresa Eckton, Kyrsten Mate (sound effects editors); Lindakay Brown, Jonathan Null (Foley editors) |
| 2001 | The Fast and the Furious | Bruce Stambler, Jay Nierenberg (supervising sound editors/sound designers); Tim Walston, Charles Deenen (sound designers); Michael Dressel (supervising Foley editor); Glenn Hoskinson, Steve Mann, Steve Nelson, Howard Neiman, Kim Secrist (sound effects editors); Scott Curtis, Dan Yale (Foley editors) |
| 2001 | Jurassic Park III | Christopher Boyes (supervising sound editor/sound designer/re-recording mixer); Howell Gibbens (supervising sound editor); James Likowski (supervising Foley editor); Frank E. Eulner, Ken Fischer (sound effects editors) |
| 2001 | Lara Croft: Tomb Raider | Steve Boeddeker (supervising sound editor/sound designer); Bub Asman, Alan Robert Murray (supervising sound editors); Thomas W. Small (supervising Foley editor); Ed Callahan, Ronald Eng, Frank E. Eulner, Andrea Gard, David Grimaldi, Robert Ireland, Doug Jackson, Michael Jonascu, Krysten Mate, Charles Maynes, Chuck Michael, Nigel Mills, Addison Teague (sound effects editors); Scott Curtis, Matthew Harrison (Foley editors) |
| 2001 | The Mummy Returns | Leslie Shatz (supervising sound editor); Malcolm Fife, Jon Olive, Ann Scibelli (sound effects editors); Jonathan Klein (Foley editor) |
| 2001 | Pearl Harbor | George Watters II, Christopher Boyes (supervising sound editors/sound designers); Victoria Martin (supervising Foley editor); Ethan Van der Ryn (additional sound designer); Beau Borders, Scott Guitteau, Suhail Kafity, Adam Kopald, F. Hudson Miller, R.J. Palmer, Christopher Scarabosio, Robert L. Sephton (sound effects editors); Matthew Harrison, James Likowski, Gary Wright (Foley editors) |
| 2001 | Planet of the Apes | Richard L. Anderson (supervising sound editor/sound designer); John Murray (supervising Foley editor); Donald Flick, Avram D. Gold, Curt Schulkey, Marvin Walowitz, David A. Whittaker (sound effects editors); Ted Caplan, John A. Larsen, Dan Yale (Foley editors) |
| 2001 | Spy Game | George Watters II, F. Hudson Miller (supervising sound editors/sound designers); Victoria Martin (supervising Foley editor); Ed Callahan, Suhail Kafity, R.J. Palmer, Gary Wright (sound effects editors); Matthew Harrison, James Likowski (Foley editors) |
| 2002 | Road to Perdition | Scott A. Hecker (supervising sound editor); Mark Pappas (supervising Foley editor); Jason W. Jennings, Kenneth L. Johnson, Eric A. Norris, Bruce Tanis (sound effects editors) |
| 2002 | The Bourne Identity | Per Hallberg, Karen Baker Landers (supervising sound editors/sound designers); Craig S. Jaeger (supervising Foley editor); Christopher Assells, Mark Choi, Dino Dimuro, Dan Hegeman, Michael Hertlein, Lou Kleinman, Perry Robertson, Bruce Tanis (sound effects editors) |
| 2002 | Gangs of New York | Philip Stockton, Eugene Gearty (supervising sound editors/sound designers); Frank Kern (supervising Foley editor); Kam Chan, Bruce Prosser, Steven Visscher (Foley editors) |
| 2002 | Minority Report | Gary Rydstrom (supervising sound editor/sound designer/re-recording mixer); Richard Hymns (supervising sound editor); David C. Hughes, J.R. Grubbs, Kyrsten Mate (sound effects editors); Lindakay Brown, Jonathan Null (Foley editors) |
| 2002 | Panic Room | Ren Klyce (supervising sound editor/sound designer); Richard Hymns (supervising sound editor); Malcolm Fife (supervising Foley editor); Eric Dachs, Luke Dunn Gielmuda, David C. Hughes, Doug Winningham (sound effects editors) |
| 2002 | Spider-Man | Susan Dudeck, Stephen Hunter Flick (supervising sound editors/sound designers); Dana Gustafson (supervising Foley editor); Michael J. Benavente, Donald Flick, William Jacobs, Jon Mete, Steven Ticknor (sound effects editors) |
| 2002 | Star Wars: Episode II – Attack of the Clones | Ben Burtt (supervising sound editor/sound designer); Matthew Wood (supervising sound editor); Teresa Eckton, Bruce Lacey, Christopher Scarabosio (sound effects editors); Mary Helen Leasman, Kevin Sellers (Foley editors) |
| 2002 | We Were Soldiers | Lon Bender, Mark P. Stoeckinger (supervising sound editors/sound designers); Wylie Stateman (supervising Foley editor); Gregory Hainer, Hector C. Gika, Peter J. Lehman, Michael A. Reagan, Geoffrey G. Rubay, Bruce Tanis (sound effects editors) |
| 2002 | XXX | Bruce Stambler (supervising sound editor/sound designer); Michael Dressel (supervising Foley editor); Mike Chock, Harry Cohen, Ken Fischer, Elliott Koretz, Steve Mann, Steve Nelson, Michael Payne, Kim Secrist, Tim Walston, Richard E. Yawn (sound effects editors); Frank A. Fuller Jr., Shawn Sykora (Foley editors) |
| 2003 | Master and Commander: The Far Side of the World | Richard King (supervising sound editor/sound designer); Christopher Flick (supervising Foley editor); Michael W. Mitchell, Hamilton Sterling (sound effects editors) |
| 2003 | The Italian Job | Mark P. Stoeckinger (supervising sound editor/sound designer); Thomas W. Small (supervising Foley editor); Bryan Bowen, Dan Hegeman, Kenneth L. Johnson, Michael Kamper, Randy Kelley, Alan Rankin, Peter Zinda (sound effects editors); Fred Burke, Ed Callahan, Willard Overstreet (Foley editors) |
| 2003 | Kill Bill: Volume 1 | Wylie Stateman (supervising sound editor/sound designer); Scott Martin Gershin (supervising sound editor); Kerry Carmean-Williams, Harry Cohen (sound designers); Bob Beher, Dino Dimuro, Dan Hegeman, Scott Sanders (sound effects editors); Craig S. Jaeger (Foley editor) |
| 2003 | The Last Samurai | Mark P. Stoeckinger (supervising sound editor/sound designer); Michael Kamper, Jon Title (sound designers); Craig S. Jaeger (supervising Foley editor); Christopher Assells, Dino Dimuro, Alan Rankin, Bruce Tanis, Ben Wilkins (sound effects editors); Bob Beher, Frank Smathers (Foley editors) |
| 2003 | The Matrix Reloaded | Dane A. Davis (supervising sound editor/sound designer); Julia Evershade (supervising sound editor); Thom Brennan (supervising Foley editor); Richard Adrian, Michael Edward Johnson, Andrew Lackey, Mark Larry, Eric Lindemann, Michael W. Mitchell (sound effects editors) |
| 2003 | Open Range | Barney Cabral, Perry Robertson (supervising sound editors); Scott Sanders (sound designer); Stu Bernstein, Rickley W. Dumm, Frederick H. Stahly (sound effects editors) |
| 2003 | Pirates of the Caribbean: The Curse of the Black Pearl | Christopher Boyes, George Watters II (supervising sound editors/sound designers); Victoria Martin (supervising Foley editor); Ken Fischer, Tim Nielsen, Addison Teague (sound effects editors); Christine Danelski, Valerie Davidson, James Likowski, Matthew Harrison, Solange S. Schwalbe (Foley editors) |
| 2003 | Seabiscuit | Per Hallberg, Karen Baker Landers (supervising sound editors/sound designers); Craig S. Jaeger (supervising Foley editor); Christopher Assells, Dino Dimuro, Ezra Dweck, Dan Hegeman, Scott Sanders, Peter Staubli, Bruce Tanis (sound effects editors) |
| 2003 | Terminator 3: Rise of the Machines | Stephen Hunter Flick (supervising sound editor/sound designer); Matthew C. Beville (supervising Foley editor); Paula Fairfield, Ken Fischer, Donald Flick, Jason W. Jennings, Carla Murray, Steven Ticknor, Ben Wilkins (sound effects editors) |
| 2004 | The Aviator | Eugene Gearty, Philip Stockton (supervising sound editors/sound designers); Frank Kern (supervising Foley editor); Wyatt Sprague (sound effects editor); Kam Chan, Jacob Ribicoff, Steven Visscher (Foley editors) |
| 2004 | The Bourne Supremacy | Per Hallberg, Karen Baker Landers (supervising sound editors/sound designers); Christopher Assells, Dino Dimuro, Dan Hegeman, Scott Sanders, Peter Staubli (sound effects editors) |
| 2004 | Collateral | Elliott Koretz (supervising sound editor); Thom Brennan (supervising Foley editor); Mike Chock, Steve Nelson, Michael Payne, Kim Secrist (sound effects editors) |
| 2004 | The Day After Tomorrow | Larry Kemp, Mark P. Stoeckinger (supervising sound editors/sound designers); Glenn T. Morgan (supervising Foley editor/sound editor); Bob Beher, Harry Cohen, Craig S. Jaeger, Michael Kamper, Randy Keller, Alan Rankin, Ann Scibelli (sound effects editors) |
| 2004 | I, Robot | Craig Berkey (supervising sound editor/sound designer); John A. Larsen (supervising sound editor); Erik Aadahl (additional sound designer); John Murray (supervising Foley editor); Jay Wilkinson (sound effects editor); Stu Bernstein, Steve F. Price (Foley editors) |
| 2004 | Kill Bill: Volume 2 | Wylie Stateman (supervising sound editor/sound designer); Harry Cohen (supervising sound editor); Bob Beher, Kerry Carmean-Williams, Dino Dimuro, Hector C. Gika, Tom Ozanich, Branden Spencer, Jon Title (sound effects editors) |
| 2004 | Million Dollar Baby | Bub Asman, Alan Robert Murray (supervising sound editors); David Grimaldi, Jason King (sound effects editors) |
| 2004 | Spider-Man 2 | Paul N. J. Ottosson (supervising sound editor/sound designer); Christopher Flick (supervising Foley editor); Lisa Hannan, Ai-Ling Lee, Martin Lopez, Bernard Weiser, Scott G.G. Haller, Reuben Simon, Jussi Tegelman (sound effects editors) |
| 2005 | Best Sound Editing in Feature Film – Sound Effects & Foley | |
| 2005 | War of the Worlds | Richard King (supervising sound editor/sound designer); Randy Thom (additional sound designer); Christopher Flick (supervising Foley editor); Richard Hymns, Addison Teague, Michael Babcock, Aaron Glascock, Jonathan Klein, Michael W. Mitchell, Will Files, Piero Mura, Mark Pappas, Hamilton Sterling (sound effects editors); Michael Broomberg, Gary A. Hecker (Foley artists) |
| 2005 | The Chronicles of Narnia: The Lion, the Witch and the Wardrobe | George Watters II, Richard Beggs (supervising sound editors/sound designers); Victoria Martin (supervising Foley editor); Heather Gross, Suhail Kafity, Chuck Michael, F. Hudson Miller, John Morris, R.J. Palmer, Todd Toon, Gary Wright (sound effects editors); Matthew Harrison, James Likowski (Foley editors); John T. Cucci, Dan O'Connell (Foley artists) |
| 2005 | The Island | Per Hallberg, Karen Baker Landers (supervising sound editors/sound designers); Christopher Scarabosio, Tim Nielsen (additional sound designers); Craig S. Jaeger (supervising Foley editor); Christopher Assells, Dino Dimuro, Dan Hegeman, Chris Hogan, Michael Payne, Peter Staubli, Bruce Tanis, Karen Vassar Triest, David Werntz (sound effects editors); Lou Kleinman, Dave McMoyler (Foley editors); John T. Cucci, Dan O'Connell (Foley artists) |
| 2005 | The Legend of Zorro | Bub Asman, Alan Robert Murray (supervising sound editors); Michael Dressel (supervising Foley editor); David Grimaldi Jason W. Jennings, Jason King (sound effects editors); Linda Lew, Shawn Sykora (Foley editors); Michael Broomberg, Vincent Guisetti, Pamela Kahn (Foley artists) |
| 2005 | Memoirs of a Geisha | Wylie Stateman (supervising sound editor/sound designer); Harry Cohen (supervising sound editor); Dino Dimuro, Hector C. Gika, Ann Scibelli, Branden Spencer (sound effects editors); Michael Broomberg, Gary A. Hecker (Foley artists) |
| 2005 | Sin City | Tim Rakoczy (supervising sound editor); Craig Henighan, William Jacobs (sound designers); Paula Fairfield, Carla Murray (sound effects editors); Edward M. Steidele, Jerry Trent (Foley artists) |
| 2005 | Star Wars: Episode III – Revenge of the Sith | Ben Burtt (supervising sound editor/sound designer); Matthew Wood (supervising sound editor); Christopher Scarabosio, Tom Myers, Teresa Eckton, Steve Slanec (sound effects editors); Kevin Sellers (Foley editor); Ellen Heuer, Dennie Thorpe, Jana Vance (Foley artists) |
| 2006 | Letters from Iwo Jima | Bub Asman, Alan Robert Murray (supervising sound editors); Michael Dressel (supervising Foley editor); Christopher Flick, Jason W. Jennings, Jason King, Steve Mann, Shawn Sykora (sound effects editors); Robin Harlan, Sarah Monat (Foley artists) |
| 2006 | Blood Diamond | Lon Bender (supervising sound editor/sound designer); Christopher Assells, Harry Cohen, Karen Vassar Triest (sound effects editors); Craig S. Jaeger (Foley editor); David Lee Fein, Pamela Kahn, Alyson Dee Moore, John Roesch, Joseph T. Sabella, Damien Smith (Foley artists) |
| 2006 | Flags of Our Fathers | Bub Asman, Alan Robert Murray (supervising sound editors); Steven Ticknor (sound designer/sound effects editor); Michael Dressel (supervising Foley editor); Valerie Davidson, Jason W. Jennings, Jason King, Steve Mann, Charles Maynes (sound effects editors); John T. Cucci, Dan O'Connell (Foley artists) |
| 2006 | Mission: Impossible III | Alan Rankin, Mark P. Stoeckinger (supervising sound editors/sound designers); Michael Kamper, Jon Title, Scott Wolf (sound designers/sound effects editors); Scott Curtis, Thomas W. Small (supervising Foley editors); Kenneth L. Johnson, Beth Sterner, Peter Zinda (sound effects editors); Linda Lew (Foley editor); Robin Harlan, Sarah Monat (Foley artists) |
| 2006 | Pirates of the Caribbean: Dead Man's Chest | Christopher Boyes, George Watters II (supervising sound editors/sound designers); Victoria Martin (supervising Foley editor); Brent Burge, Ken Fischer, Melanie Graham, Shannon Mills, Tim Nielsen, Dee Selby, Addison Teague (sound effects editors); Matthew Harrison, James Likowski, F. Hudson Miller (Foley editors); John T. Cucci, Dan O'Connell (Foley artists) |
| 2006 | The Prestige | Richard King (supervising sound editor/sound designer); Christopher Flick (supervising Foley editor); Paul Berolzheimer, Jonathan Klein, Michael W. Mitchell (sound effects editors); Alyson Dee Moore, John Roesch (Foley editors) |
| 2006 | Superman Returns | Erik Aadahl, Craig Berkey (supervising sound editors/sound designers); Christopher S. Aud (sound effects editor); Craig S. Jaeger (Foley editor); Pamela Kahn, Alyson Dee Moore, John Roesch (Foley artists) |
| 2006 | World Trade Center | Wylie Stateman (supervising sound editor/sound designer); Anne Scibelli, Renée Tondelli, Michael D. Wilhoit (supervising sound editors); Scott Curtis (supervising Foley editor); Charlie Campagna, Hector C. Gika, Linda Lew, Daniel R. Kerr, Mark Ormandy, Jeremy Pitts, Branden Spencer, Scott Wolf (sound effects editors); Robin Harlan, Sarah Monat, James Moriana, Jeffrey Wilhoit (Foley artists) |
| 2007 | The Bourne Ultimatum | Per Hallberg, Karen Baker Landers (supervising sound editors/sound designers); Craig S. Jaeger, Kelly Oxford (supervising Foley editors); Christopher Assells, Dino Dimuro, Hector C. Gika, Dan Hegeman, Ann Scibelli, Chris Hogan Peter Staubli, Jon Title (sound effects editors) |
| 2007 | 3:10 to Yuma | Donald Sylvester (supervising sound editor); John Murray (supervising Foley editor); Steve Bissinger, Ted Caplan, Simon Coke, Scott Curtis, Matthew Harrison (sound effects editors); Dawn Fintor, Elizabeth Rainey, Alicia Stevenson (Foley artists) |
| 2007 | American Gangster | Per Hallberg, Karen Baker Landers (supervising sound editors/sound designers); Craig S. Jaeger (supervising Foley editor); Christopher Assells, Dino Dimuro, Dan Hegeman, Peter Staubli, Jon Title (sound effects editors) |
| 2007 | I Am Legend | Skip Lievsay (supervising sound editor/sound designer); Jeremy Peirson (sound designer); John Joseph Thomas (supervising Foley editor); Craig Berkey, Greg ten Bosch, Jason W. Jennings, James Morioka (sound effects editors); Christopher Flick, Ryan Juggler (Foley editors); Alyson Dee Moore, John Roesch (Foley artists); Johnna Chism, Joel Dougherty, Todd Harris, P.K. Hooker (assistant sound effects editors); John P. Fasal (Foley recordist); Mary Jo Lang (Foley mixer) |
| 2007 | No Country for Old Men | Skip Lievsay (supervising sound editor); Craig Berkey (sound effects editor); Catherine Harper, Christopher Moriana, Derek Vanderhorst (Foley artists) |
| 2007 | Pirates of the Caribbean: At World's End | Christopher Boyes, George Watters II (supervising sound editors/sound designers); Tim Nielsen, Christopher Scarabosio (sound designers); Victoria Martin (supervising Foley editor); Ken Fischer, J.R. Grubbs, David C. Hughes, Shannon Mills, Addison Teague (sound effects editors); Matthew Harrison, James Likowski, Thomas W. Small (Foley editors) |
| 2007 | Spider-Man 3 | Paul N. J. Ottosson (supervising sound editor/sound designer); Joseph Bonn, Greg ten Bosch, Chris M. Jacobson, Jussi Tegelman, Bernard Weiser (sound effects editors); Scott Curtis, Christopher Flick (Foley editors); Michael Broomberg, Gary A. Hecker (Foley artists) |
| 2007 | Transformers | Ethan Van der Ryn, Mike Hopkins, (supervising sound editors/sound designers); Luke Dunn Gielmuda (supervising Foley editor); Erik Aadahl (additional sound designer); Christopher S. Aud, Michael Babcock, Craig Berkey, Brent Burge, Steve Bissinger, Warren Hendriks, P.K. Hooker, Jeff Sawyer, Robert Shoup (sound effects editors); Coya Elliot, Pascal Garneau (Foley editors); John Roesch, Alyson Dee Moore (Foley artists) |
| 2008 | The Dark Knight | Richard King (supervising sound editor/sound designer); Christopher Flick (supervising Foley editor); Michael Babcock, Michael W. Mitchell, Hamilton Sterling (sound effects editors); Alyson Dee Moore, John Roesch (Foley artists) |
| 2008 | Cloverfield | Will Files, Douglas Murray (supervising sound editors/sound designers); Steve Bissinger, Kim Foscato, Andrea Gard, Luke Dunn Gielmuda, Josh Gold, Robert Shoup (sound effects editors); Samuel H. Hinckley (Foley editor); Goro Koyama, Andy Malcolm (Foley artists) |
| 2008 | The Curious Case of Benjamin Button | Ren Klyce (supervising sound editor/sound designer/re-recording mixer); Thom Brennan (supervising Foley editor); Coya Elliot, Malcolm Fife, Larry Oatfield (sound effects editors); Alyson Dee Moore, John Roesch (Foley artists) |
| 2008 | Eagle Eye | Per Hallberg, Karen Baker Landers (supervising sound editors/sound designers); Craig S. Jaeger, Glenn T. Morgan (supervising Foley editors); Christopher Assells, Dino Dimuro, Albert Gasser, Hector C. Gika, Dan Hegeman, Peter Staubli, Bruce Tanis (sound effects editors); John T. Cucci, Dan O'Connell (Foley artists) |
| 2008 | Indiana Jones and the Kingdom of the Crystal Skull | Ben Burtt (supervising sound editor/sound designer); Richard Hymns (supervising sound editor); Christopher Scarabosio (additional sound designer); Luke Dunn Gielmuda (supervising Foley editor); Krysten Mate, Shannon Mills, Tim Nielsen, Addison Teague (sound effects editors); Pascal Garneau (Foley editor); Ellen Heuer, Dennie Thorpe, Jana Vance (Foley artists) |
| 2008 | Iron Man | Christopher Boyes (supervising sound editor/sound designer/re-recording mixer); Frank E. Eulner (supervising sound editor); Shannon Mills (additional sound designer); Ken Fischer, J.R. Grubbs (sound effects editors); James Likowski, Robert Shoup (Foley editors); Ronni Brown, Ellen Heuer, Dennie Thorpe, Jana Vance (Foley artists) |
| 2008 | Speed Racer | Dane A. Davis (supervising sound editor/sound designer); Bill R. Dean (supervising sound editor); Scott Curtis (supervising Foley editor); Christopher S. Aud, Mike Chock, Adam Kopald, Tom Ozanich, Bryan O. Watkins, David Werntz, David A. Whittaker, Drew Yerys (sound effects editors); David Lee Fein, John Roesch (Foley artists) |
| 2008 | Wanted | Wylie Stateman (supervising sound editor/sound designer); Harry Cohen, Ann Scibelli (sound designers/sound effects editors); Hector C. Gika, Margit Pfeiffer, Branden Spencer, David Stanke, Jon Title (sound effects editors); James Moriana, Jeffrey Wilhoit (Foley artists) |
| 2009 | James Cameron's Avatar | Christopher Boyes (supervising sound editor/sound designer/re-recording mixer); Gwendolyn Yates Whittle, Addison Teague (supervising sound editors); Luke Dunn Gielmuda (supervising Foley editor); Ken Fischer, Shannon Mills, Tim Nielsen, Christopher Scarabosio (sound effects editors); James Likowski (Foley editor); Dennie Thorpe, Jana Vance (Foley artists) |
| 2009 | 2012 | Paul N. J. Ottosson (supervising sound editor/sound designer); Mark Pappas (supervising Foley editor); Thom Brennan, Lee Gilmore, Jamie Hardt, Ai-Ling Lee, Angelo Palazzo, Bernard Weiser (sound effects editors); Michael Broomberg, Gary A. Hecker (Foley artists) |
| 2009 | The Hurt Locker | Paul N. J. Ottosson (supervising sound editor/sound designer); Jamie Hardt, Chris M. Jacobson, Bernard Weiser, Ryan Juggler (sound effects editors); Richard C. Franklin (Foley editor); Alex Ullrich (Foley artist) |
| 2009 | Inglourious Basterds | Wylie Stateman (supervising sound editor/sound designer); Harry Cohen, Ann Scibelli (sound designers); Paul Aulicino, Hector C. Gika, Craig S. Jaeger, Michael Keller, Dror Mohar, Branden Spencer (sound effects editor/Foley editor); James Moriana, Jeffrey Wilhoit (Foley artists) |
| 2009 | Push | Paula Fairfield (supervising sound editor/sound designer); Carla Murray (sound designer); Alex Bullick, Bob Kellough (sound effects editors); Tim Rakoczy (Foley editor); Catherine Harper, Christopher Moriana (Foley artists) |
| 2009 | Star Trek | Alan Rankin, Mark P. Stoeckinger (supervising sound editors/sound designers); Ben Burtt, Tim Walston, Ann Scibelli (sound designers); Thomas W. Small (supervising Foley editor); David Barbee, Charlie Campagna, Harry Cohen, Scott Martin Gershin, Glenn T. Morgan, Geoffrey G. Rubay, Ben Wilkins (sound effects editors); Robin Harlan, Sarah Monat (Foley artists) |
| 2009 | Transformers: Revenge of the Fallen | Ethan Van der Ryn, Erik Aadahl (supervising sound editors/sound designers); Jonathan Klein (supervising Foley editor); Greg ten Bosch, Warren Hendriks, P.K. Hooker, John Marquis (sound effects editors); Alyson Dee Moore, John Roesch (Foley artist) |
| 2009 | Watchmen | Scott A. Hecker (supervising sound editor/sound designer); Eric A. Norris (supervising sound editor); Jeremy Peirson (sound designer); Tim Gedemer, Rick Hromadka, Ai-Ling Lee, Daniel Pagan, Bruce Tanis, David Werntz (sound effects editors); Derek Pippert (Foley editor); Michael Broomberg, Gary A. Hecker (Foley artists) |

=== 2010s ===
| Year | Film | Winners/Nominees |
|---|---|---|
| 2010 | Inception | Richard King (supervising sound editor/sound designer); Christopher Flick (supervising Foley editor); Michael Babcock, Paul Berolzheimer, Michael W. Mitchell, Bryan O. Watkins (sound effects editors); Bruce Tanis (Foley editor); Alyson Dee Moore, John Roesch (Foley artists) |
| 2010 | 127 Hours | Glenn Freemantle (supervising sound editor/sound designer); Niv Adiri, Ben Barker (sound effects editors); Nicolas Becker (Foley editor/artist); Jon Olive (Foley editor) |
| 2010 | Black Swan | Craig Henighan (supervising sound editor/sound designer); Brian Emrich (sound designer); Wayne Lemmer (sound effects editor); Steve Baine (Foley artist) |
| 2010 | Iron Man 2 | Christopher Boyes (supervising sound editor/sound designer/re-recording mixer); Frank E. Eulner (supervising sound editor); James Likowski (supervising Foley editor); Ken Fischer, J.R. Grubbs, Scott Guitteau, Kyrsten Mate (sound effects editors); Andrea Gard, Luke Dunn Gielmuda, Robert Shoup (Foley editors); Dennie Thorpe, Jana Vance (Foley artists) |
| 2010 | Salt | Paul Hsu, Warren Shaw, Philip Stockton (supervising sound editors); Frank Kern (supervising Foley editor); Marko A. Costanzo, Dan O'Connell (Foley artists) |
| 2010 | Tron: Legacy | Addison Teague, Gwendolyn Yates Whittle (supervising sound editors); Steve Boeddeker, Christopher Boyes (sound designers); Jonathan Null (supervising Foley editor); Teresa Eckton, Ken Fischer, Josh Gold, Warren Hendriks, Adam Kopald, Kyrsten Mate, Mac Smith, Christopher Scarabosio (sound effects editors); Brian Chumney (Foley editor); Dennie Thorpe, Jana Vance (Foley artists) |
| 2010 | True Grit | Skip Lievsay (supervising sound editor); Craig Berkey (sound designer); Joel Dougherty (supervising Foley editor); Jay Wilkinson (sound effects editor); Bob Beher, Marko A. Costanzo (Foley editors) |
| 2010 | Unstoppable | Mark P. Stoeckinger (supervising sound editor/sound designer); Alan Rankin, Ann Scibelli (sound designers); Christopher Assells, Dino Dimuro, Hector C. Gika (sound effects editors); Catherine Harper, Gary A. Hecker, Christopher Moriana, Dan O'Connell (Foley artists) |
| 2011 | War Horse | Gary Rydstrom (supervising sound editor/sound designer/re-recording mixer); Richard Hymns (supervising sound editor); Luke Dunn Gielmuda (supervising Foley editor); Colette D. Dahanne, Teresa Eckton, Kyrsten Mate, Tim Nielsen (sound effects editors); Dennie Thorpe, Jana Vance (Foley artists) |
| 2011 | Drive | Lon Bender, Victor Ray Ennis (supervising sound editors); Peter Zinda (sound designer/sound effects editor); Damian Volpe (sound effects editor); Paul Hackner (Foley editor); Catherine Harper, Christopher Moriana (Foley artists); Kerry Carmean-Williams (background editor) |
| 2011 | Fast Five | Peter Brown (supervising sound editor); Glynna Grimala, Stephen P. Robinson (sound designers); Paul Aulicino (supervising Foley editor); Charles Maynes, Ann Scibelli, Peter Staubli, Jon Title, Tim Walston (sound effects editors); Kerry Carmean-Williams, George Pereyra (Foley editors); Gary A. Hecker; Katherine Rose (Foley artist) |
| 2011 | The Girl with the Dragon Tattoo | Ren Klyce (supervising sound editor/sound designer/re-recording mixer); Thom Brennan (supervising sound editor/Foley editor); Al Nelson, Coya Elliott, Scott Guitteau, David C. Hughes, Krysten Mate, Larry Oatfield (sound effects editors); Alyson Dee Moore, John Roesch (Foley artists) |
| 2011 | Mission: Impossible – Ghost Protocol | Gary Rydstrom (supervising sound editor/sound designer/re-recording mixer); Richard Hymns (supervising sound editor); Luke Dunn Gielmuda (supervising Foley editor); Dustin Cawood, Teresa Eckton, Will Files, Ken Fischer, Pascal Garneau (sound effects editors); Dennie Thorpe, Jana Vance (Foley artists) |
| 2011 | Rise of the Planet of the Apes | Chuck Michael (supervising sound editor/sound designer); John A. Larsen (supervising sound editor); John Murray (supervising Foley editor); David Grimaldi, Wayne Lemmer, John Morris (sound effects editors); Matthew Harrison, Thomas W. Small, Bruce Tanis (Foley editors); John T. Cucci, Dawn Fintor, Dan O'Connell, Alicia Stevenson (Foley artists) |
| 2011 | Super 8 | Ben Burtt (supervising sound editor/sound designer); Matthew Wood (supervising sound editor); Gary Rydstrom (additional sound designer); Kevin Sellers (supervising Foley editor); David Acord, Dustin Cawood, Adam Kopald, Steve Slanec (sound effects editors), Malcolm Fife, Luke Dunn Gielmuda (Foley editors); Ronni Brown, Sean England (Foley artists) |
| 2011 | Transformers: Dark of the Moon | Ethan Van der Ryn, Erik Aadahl (supervising sound editors/sound designers); Jonathan Klein (supervising Foley editor); Greg ten Bosch, P.K. Hooker, Ai-Ling Lee, John Marquis, Tobias Poppe, Christian Schaanning (sound effects editors); Willard Overstreet (Foley editor); Alyson Dee Moore, John Roesch (Foley artists) |
| 2012 | Skyfall | Per Hallberg, Karen Baker Landers (supervising sound editors/sound designers); Christopher Assells, Peter Staubli (sound designers); Craig S. Jaeger (supervising Foley editor); Bill R. Dean, Dino Dimuro, Dan Hegeman, Piero Mura (sound effects editors); John T. Cucci, Dan O'Connell (Foley artists) |
| 2012 | Argo | Ethan Van der Ryn, Erik Aadahl (supervising sound editors/sound designers); Jonathan Klein (supervising Foley editor); Greg ten Bosch, P.K. Hooker (sound effects editors); John T. Cucci, Dan O'Connell (Foley artists) |
| 2012 | The Avengers | Christopher Boyes (supervising sound editor/sound designer/re-recording mixer); Frank E. Eulner (supervising sound editor); Justin Doyle (sound designer); James Likowski (supervising Foley editor/sound effects editor); Steve Boeddeker, David Chrastka, Teresa Eckton, Luke Dunn Gielmuda, J.R. Grubbs, Scott Guitteau, Kyrsten Mate, Robert Shoup (sound effects editors); Sean England, Jana Vance (Foley artists) |
| 2012 | The Dark Knight Rises | Richard King (supervising sound editor/sound designer); Kenneth L. Johnson (sound designer); Christopher Flick (supervising Foley editor); Randle Akerson, Micahel Babcock, Michael W. Mitchell, Jeff Sawyer, Bryan O. Watkins (sound effects editors); Alyson Dee Moore, John Roesch (Foley artists) |
| 2012 | Django Unchained | Wylie Stateman (supervising sound editor/sound designer); Harry Cohen (sound designer); Kris Fenske, Hector C. Gika, Dror Mohar, Branden Spencer, Michael D. Wilhoit (sound effects editors); Gary A. Hecker, Gary Marullo (Foley artists) |
| 2012 | The Hobbit: An Unexpected Journey | Brent Burge, Chris Ward (supervising sound editors/sound designers); David Farmer (additional sound designer); Craig Tomlinson (supervising Foley editor); Hayden Collow, Justin Webster (sound effects editor); Matthew Lambourn (Foley editor) |
| 2012 | Life of Pi | Eugene Gearty (supervising sound editor/sound designer/sound effects editor); Philip Stockton (supervising sound editor); Frank Kern (supervising Foley editor); John Morris, Jamie Baker, Kam Chan (sound effects editors); Marko A. Costanzo (Foley artist) |
| 2012 | Prometheus | Victor Ray Ennis, Mark P. Stoeckinger (supervising sound editors/sound designers); Alan Rankin, Ann Scibelli (sound designers); Charlie Campagna, Harry Cohen, Glenn T. Morgan, Karen Vassar Triest, Tim Walston (sound effects editors); John T. Cucci, Dan O'Connell (Foley artists) |
| 2013 | Gravity | Glenn Freemantle (supervising sound editor/sound designer); Niv Adiri, Ben Barker, Eilam Hoffman, Danny Freemantle (sound effects editors); Nicolas Becker (Foley artist); Hugo Adams (Foley editor) |
| 2013 | 12 Years a Slave | Ryan Collins, Robert Jackson (supervising sound editors); Leslie Shatz (sound designer); Brian Dunlop (supervising Foley editor); Jon Vogl (sound effects editor); Ellen Heuer (Foley artist) |
| 2013 | All Is Lost | Steve Boeddeker (supervising sound editor/sound designer/re-recording mixer); Richard Hymns (supervising sound/Foley editor); Brandon Procter (sound effects editor); Goro Koyama, Andy Malcolm (Foley artists) |
| 2013 | Captain Phillips | Oliver Tarney (supervising sound editor); Michael Fentum, James Harrison (sound designers); Mark Taylor (supervising Foley editor); Dillon Bennett (sound effects editor); Peter Burgis, Jason Swanscott (Foley artists) |
| 2013 | Fast & Furious 6 | Peter Brown (supervising sound editor); Harry Cohen, Stephen P. Robinson, Peter Staubli, Jay Wilkinson (sound designers); Paul Aulicino (supervising Foley editor); Kris Fenske, Glynna Grimala, Piero Mura (sound effects editors); Joe Dzuban (Foley editor); Gary A. Hecker, Gary Marullo (Foley artists) |
| 2013 | The Hobbit: The Desolation of Smaug | Chris Ward (supervising sound editor/sound designer); David Farmer, Dave Whitehead (sound designers); Craig Tomlinson (supervising Foley editor); Hayden Collow, Melanie Graham, Justin Webster (sound effects editors); John Simpson (Foley artist) |
| 2013 | Iron Man 3 | Andrew DeCristofaro, Mark P. Stoeckinger (supervising sound editors/sound designers); Alan Rankin, Ann Scibelli (sound designers); Charlie Campagna, Shannon Mills, Karen Vassar Triest, Tim Walston, Masanobu 'Tomi' Tomita (sound effects editors); John T. Cucci, Dan O'Connell (Foley artists) |
| 2013 | Lone Survivor | Wylie Stateman (supervising sound editor/sound designer); Harry Cohen (sound designer); Charlie Campagna, Hector C. Gika, Dror Mohar, Branden Spencer (sound effects editors); Gary A. Hecker, Gary Marullo (Foley artists) |

Best Sound Editing – Sound Effects and Foley in an English Language Feature

| Year | Film | Winners/Nominees |
|---|---|---|
| 2014 | American Sniper | Bub Asman, Alan Robert Murray (supervising sound editors); Tom Ozanich (sound designer); Michael Dressel (supervising Foley editor); Jason King, Mark Larry, Roland N. Thai (sound effects editors); Christopher Flick (Foley editor); John T. Cucci, Dan O'Connell (Foley artists) |
| 2014 | Birdman or (The Unexpected Virtue of Ignorance) | Peter Brown, Aaron Glascock (supervising sound editors/sound designers); Martin Hernández (supervising sound editor); Goeun Lee Everett (supervising Foley editor); Gary A. Hecker (supervising Foley artist); Paul Aulicino, Albert Gasser, Jeremy Peirson, Alejandro Quevedo, Roland N. Thai (sound effects editors); Joe Dzuban (Foley editor); Catherine Harper, Gary Marullo, Jeffrey Wilhoit (Foley artists) |
| 2014 | Captain America: The Winter Soldier | Daniel Laurie, Shannon Mills (supervising sound editors); Al Nelson, David C. Hughes (sound designers); Nia Hansen (supervising Foley editor); David Acord, Jeremy Bowker, Ken Fischer, Josh Gold, J.R. Grubbs, Richard Hymns (sound effects editors); Dee Selby (Foley editor); Ronni Brown, Sean England (Foley artists) |
| 2014 | Dawn of the Planet of the Apes | Will Files, Douglas Murray (supervising sound editors/sound designers); John Murray (supervising Foley editor); David Grimaldi, Scott Guitteau, Doug Jackson, John Morris, Mac Smith, Jack Whittaker (sound effects editors); Scott Curtis, Matthew Harrison, Thomas W. Small (Foley editors); John T. Cucci, Goro Koyama, Andy Malcolm, Dan O'Connell (Foley artists) |
| 2014 | Fury | Paul N. J. Ottosson (supervising sound editor/sound designer); Mark Pappas (supervising Foley editor); Lee Gilmore, Jamie Hardt, Hamilton Sterling, Bruce Tanis (sound effects editors); Scott Curtis, Ryan Juggler, Jonathan Klein (Foley editors); Gary A. Hecker, Rick Owens (Foley artists) |
| 2014 | Guardians of the Galaxy | Christopher Boyes (supervising sound editor/sound designer/re-recording mixer); Matthew Wood (supervising sound editor); David Acord (sound designer/sound effects editor); Kevin Sellers (supervising Foley editor); David Chrastka, Kyrsten Mate (sound effects editors); Luke Dunn Gielmuda, Dee Selby (Foley editors); Dennie Thorpe, Jana Vance (Foley artists) |
| 2014 | Interstellar | Richard King (supervising sound editor/sound designer); Christopher Flick (supervising Foley editor); Aaron Glascock, Ken J. Johnson, Michael W. Mitchell, Jeff Sawyer (sound effects editors); Scott Curtis, Michael Dressel (Foley editors); Alyson Dee Moore, John Roesch (Foley artists) |
| 2014 | Unbroken | Becky Sullivan, Andrew DeCristofaro (supervising sound editors); Eric A. Norris, Jay Wilkinson (sound designers); David Raines (supervising Foley editor); Dan Hegeman, Nancy MacLeod, Karen Vassar Triest, Darren 'Sunny' Warkentin (sound effects editors); John T. Cucci, Dan O'Connell (Foley artists) |

Best Sound Editing – Sound Effects and Foley in a Feature Film

| Year | Film | Winners/Nominees |
|---|---|---|
| 2015 | Mad Max: Fury Road | Scott Hecker, Mark Mangini, Wayne Pashley (supervising sound editors); Julian Slater, David White (sound designers); Stuart Morton (supervising Foley editor); Christopher S. Aud, Phil Barrie, Cate Cahill, Nigel Christensen, Jared Dwyer, Mario Gabrieli, Rick Lisle, Chuck Michael, Andrew Miller, Emma Mitchell, Michael W. Mitchell, Fabian Sanjurjo, Alicia Slusarski (sound effects editors); John Simpson, Blair Slater (Foley artists) |
| 2015 | The Revenant | Randy Thom (supervising sound editor/sound designer/re-recording mixer); Lon Bender, Martin Hernández (supervising sound editors); Jon Title (sound designer); Geordy Sincavage (supervising Foley editor); Todd Toon (additional supervising sound editor); Bill R. Dean, Dino Dimuro, Hector C. Gika, Adam Kopald, Mark Larry, Dave McMoyler, Stephen P. Robinson, Pernell L. Salinas, D. Chris Smith (sound effects editors); Nancy MacLeod, Aran Tanchum, Ryan Wassil (Foley editors); Gregg Barbanell, Andrea Gard, Vincent Guisetti, Catherine Harper, Rick Owens, Katherine Rose, Gretchen Thoma (Foley artists) |
| 2015 | Ant-Man | Shannon Mills, Daniel Laurie (supervising sound editors); David Farmer, David C. Hughes (sound designers); James Likowski (supervising Foley editor); Jeremy Bowker, Josh Gold, Nia Hansen, Bob Kellough, Jack Whittaker (sound effects editors); Dee Selby (Foley editor); Ronni Brown, John T. Cucci, Sean England, Dan O'Connel (Foley artists) |
| 2015 | Jurassic World | Al Nelson (supervising sound editor/sound designer); Gwendolyn Yates Whittle (supervising sound editor); Gary Rydstrom; Pete Horner (additional sound designers); Nia Hansen (supervising Foley editor); Benjamin A. Burtt, Pascal Garneau, Scott Guitteau (sound effects editors); Dennie Thorpe, Jana Vance (Foley artists) |
| 2015 | The Martian | Oliver Tarney (supervising sound editor/sound designer); Michael Fentum (sound designer); Hugo Adams (supervising Foley editor); James Harrison, Mark Taylor (sound effects editors); Andrea King, Jack Stew (Foley artists) |
| 2015 | Sicario | Alan Robert Murray (supervising sound editor); Tom Ozanich (sound designer); Christopher Flick (supervising Foley editor); Bub Asman, Jason King, Kevin R.W. Murray, Roland N. Thai (sound effects editors); John T. Cucci, Dan O'Connell (Foley artists) |
| 2015 | Southpaw | Mandell Winter (supervising sound editor); David Esparza (sound designer); John Sanacore (supervising Foley editor); Ryan Collins (sound effects editor); Anita Cannella, Amy Kane (Foley artists) |
| 2015 | Star Wars: The Force Awakens | David Acord, Matthew Wood (supervising sound editors/sound designers); Ben Burtt, Gary Rydstrom (sound designers); Frank Rinella (supervising Foley editor); Teresa Eckton, E.J. Holowicki (sound effects editors); Jonathan Borland, Dee Selby, Kevin Sellers (Foley editors); Ronni Brown, Andrea Gard, Margie O'Malley, Kimberly Patrick, Dennie Thorpe, Jana Vance (Foley artists) |
| 2016 | Hacksaw Ridge | Andy Wright (supervising sound editor); Steve Burgess (sound effects/Foley editor); Liam Price, Tara Webb (sound effects editor); Alex Francis (Foley editor); Mario Vaccaro (Foley artist) |
| 2016 | Arrival | Sylvain Bellemare (supervising sound editor); Olivier Calvert, Michelle Child, Dave Whitehead (sound designers); Mimi Allard, Pierre-Jules Audet, Mathieu Beaudin, Daniel Capeille, Simon Girard, Alan Robert Murray, Patrick Rioux (sound effects editors); Niels Barletta, Steven Ghouti, Olivier Guillaume, Luc Raymond (Foley editors); Nicolas Becker, Gregory Vincent (Foley artists) |
| 2016 | Captain America: Civil War | Daniel Laurie, Shannon Mills (supervising sound editors); Nia Hansen, David C. Hughes (sound designers); Jeremy Bowker, Josh Gold, J.R. Grubbs (sound effects editors); Jacob Riehle (Foley editor); Shelley Roden, John Roesch (Foley artists) |
| 2016 | Deadpool | Jim Brookshire, Wayne Lemmer (supervising sound editors); Warren Hendriks, Craig Henighan, Ai-Ling Lee (sound designers); John T. Cucci, Dan O'Connell (Foley artists) |
| 2016 | Deepwater Horizon | Wylie Stateman (supervising sound editor/sound designer); Renée Tondelli (supervising sound editor); Harry Cohen, Kris Fenske, Hector C. Gika, Eric Hoehn, Sylvain Lasseur, Dror Mohar, Branden Spencer (sound effects editors); Gary A. Hecker, Rick Owens (Foley artists) |
| 2016 | Doctor Strange | Shannon Mills, Daniel Laurie (supervising sound editors); Nia Hansen, David C. Hughes (sound designers); David Chrastka, Josh Gold, J.R. Grubbs (sound effects editors); Ryan J. Frias, Steve Orlando (Foley editors); Shelley Roden, John Roesch (Foley artists) |
| 2016 | The Jungle Book | Christopher Boyes (supervising sound editor/sound designer/re-recording mixer); Frank E. Eulner (supervising sound editor); David Chrastka, Andre Fenley, Ken Fischer (sound effects editors); James Likowski, Dee Selby (Foley editors); Dennie Thorpe, Jana Vance (Foley artists) |
| 2016 | Rogue One: A Star Wars Story | Matthew Wood (supervising sound editor); David Acord, Christopher Scarabosio (sound designers); Frank Rinella (supervising Foley editor); Jonathan Borland, Josh Gold, J.R. Grubbs (sound effects editors); Ryan J. Frias, Luke Dunn Gielmuda, Kimberly Patrick (Foley editors); Ronni Brown, Margie O'Malley (Foley artists) |

Outstanding Achievement in Sound Editing – Sound Effects and Foley for Feature Film

| Year | Film | Winners/Nominees |
|---|---|---|
| 2017 | Blade Runner 2049 | Mark Mangini (supervising sound editor); Theo Green (sound designer); Christopher S. Aud, Greg ten Bosch, Charlie Campagna, Elliot Connors, Lee Gilmore, Dave Whitehead (sound effects editors); Ezra Dweck (Foley editor); Goro Koyama, Andy Malcolm (Foley artists) |
| 2017 | Baby Driver | Julian Slater (supervising sound editor); Martin Cantwell, Arthur Graley, Jeremy Price, Rowan Watson (sound effects editors); Peter Hanson (Foley editor); Peter Burgis, Zoe Freed (Foley artists) |
| 2017 | Dunkirk | Richard King (supervising sound editor/sound designer); Michael W. Mitchell, Randy Torres (sound effects editors); Michael Dressel (Foley editor); Shelley Roden, John Roesch (Foley artists) |
| 2017 | Logan | Donald Sylvester (supervising sound editor); Wayne Lemmer, Hamilton Sterling (sound designers); Doug Jackson (sound effects editor); Matthew Harrison, John Morris (Foley editors); John T. Cucci, Dan O'Connell (Foley artists) |
| 2017 | The Shape of Water | Nathan Robitaille (supervising sound editor); Alex Bullick, Kevin Howard, Dashen Naidoo, Tyler Whitham (sound effects editors); Gina Gyles, Peter Persaud (Foley editors); Steve Baine (Foley artist) |
| 2017 | Star Wars: The Last Jedi | Ren Klyce (supervising sound editor/sound designer/re-recording mixer); Matthew Wood (supervising sound editor); Frank Rinella (supervising Foley editor); Steve Orlando (additional sound designer); Jonathan Borland, Coya Elliott, Bonnie Wild (sound effects editors); Kimberly Patrick, Dee Selby (Foley editors); Ronni Brown, Margie O'Malley (Foley artists) |
| 2017 | Thor: Ragnarok | Daniel Laurie, Shannon Mills (supervising sound editors); David Farmer, Nia Hansen (sound designers); Jeremy Bowker, David Chrastka, Samson Neslund, Steve Orlando (sound effects editors); Kimberly Patrick, Jacob Riehle (Foley editors); Shelley Roden, John Roesch (Foley artists) |
| 2017 | War for the Planet of the Apes | Will Files, Douglas Murray (supervising sound editors/sound designers); Lindsey Alvarez, David Grimaldi, P.K. Hooker, Doug Jackson, Ken McGill, Jack Whittaker (sound effects editors); Thom Brennan, Matthew Harrison, John Morris, Willard Overstreet (Foley editors); John T. Cucci, Dan O'Connell (Foley artists) |
| 2018 | A Quiet Place | Ethan Van der Ryn, Erik Aadahl (supervising sound editors/sound designers); Justin M. Davey, Brandon Jones (sound effects editors); Jonathan Klein (Foley editor); Steve Baine, Peter Persaud (Foley artists) |
| 2018 | Avengers: Infinity War | Daniel Laurie, Shannon Mills (supervising sound editors); David Farmer, Nia Hansen (sound designers); Josh Gold, Samson Neslund, Steve Orlando (sound effects editors); Christopher Flick, Kimberly Patrick, Jacob Riehle (Foley editors); John T. Cucci, Dan O'Connell, Shelley Roden, John Roesch (Foley artists) |
| 2018 | Black Panther | Steve Boeddeker (supervising sound editor/sound designer/re-recording mixer); Benjamin A. Burtt (supervising sound editor); David C. Hughes (additional sound designer); Jonathan Borland (sound effects editor); Richard Gould, James Likowski (Foley editors); Shelley Roden, John Roesch (Foley artists) |
| 2018 | Deadpool 2 | Mark P. Stoeckinger (supervising sound editor/sound designer); Chuck Michael, Alan Rankin, Martyn Zub (sound designers); John Morris (sound effects editor); Dan O'Connell (Foley artist); Matthew Harrison, Mark Pappas (Foley editor) |
| 2018 | The Favourite | Johnnie Burn (supervising sound editor); Simon Carroll (sound effects editor); Caoimhe Doyle (Foley artist); Jean McGrath, Brendan Rehill (Foley editors) |
| 2018 | First Man | Mildred Iatrou, Ai-Ling Lee (supervising sound editors); Shannon Mills (sound designer); Phil Barrie, Greg ten Bosch, Lee Gilmore, Nia Hansen (sound effects editors); Matthew Harrison, Mark Pappas (Foley editors); John T. Cucci, Dan O'Connell (Foley artists) |
| 2018 | Mission: Impossible – Fallout | James Mather (supervising sound editor); Samir Foco, Jed Loughran, David Mackie, Ben Meechan (sound effects editors); Lilly Blazewicz (Foley editor); Peter Burgis, Zoe Freed (Foley artists) |
| 2018 | Ready Player One | Gary Rydstrom (supervising sound editor/sound designer/re-recording mixer); Richard Hymns (supervising sound editor); Cameron Barker, Brent Burge, E.J. Holowicki, Kyrsten Mate, Addison Teague, Justin Webster, Doug Winningham (sound effects editors); Luke Dunn Gielmuda, Dee Selby (Foley editors); Dennie Thorpe, Jana Vance, Geoff Vaughan (Foley artists) |
| 2019 | Ford v Ferrari | Donald Sylvester (supervising sound editor); David Giammarco, Jay Wilkinson (sound designers); Eric A. Norris (sound effects editor); Anna MacKenzie (Foley editor) |
| 2019 | 1917 | Oliver Tarney (supervising sound editor); James Harrison, Michael Fentum (sound designers); Hugo Adams (Foley editor); Sue Harding, Andrea King (Foley artists) |
| 2019 | Avengers: Endgame | Daniel Laurie, Shannon Mills (supervising sound editors); David Farmer, Nia Hansen (sound designers); Josh Gold, Samson Neslund, Steve Orlando (sound effects editors); Christopher Flick, James Likowski (Foley editors); John T. Cucci, Dan O'Connell, Shelley Roden, John Roesch (Foley artists) |
| 2019 | A Hidden Life | Brad Engleking (supervising sound editor); David Forshee, Bob Kellough (sound effects editors); Dusty Albertz, Bastien Benkhelil (Foley artists) |
| 2019 | John Wick: Chapter 3 – Parabellum | Mark P. Stoeckinger (supervising sound editor/sound designer); Luke Gibleon, Alan Rankin, Martyn Zub (sound designers); John T. Cucci, Dan O'Connell (Foley artists) |
| 2019 | Joker | Alan Robert Murray (supervising sound editor); Tom Ozanich (sound designer); Darren Maynard, John Joseph Thomas, Christian Wenger (sound effects editors); Michael Dressel, Kevin R.W. Murray, Willard Overstreet (Foley editors); John T. Cucci, Dan O'Connell (Foley artists) |
| 2019 | Once Upon a Time in Hollywood | Wylie Stateman (supervising sound editor/sound designer); Harry Cohen, Sylvain Lasseur (sound designers); Gary A. Hecker, Rick Owens, Kyle Rochlin (Foley artists) |
| 2019 | Star Wars: The Rise of Skywalker | David Acord, Matthew Wood (supervising sound editors/sound designers); Frank Rinella (supervising Foley editor); Justin Doyle, Coya Elliott, Steve Slanec, Addison Teague (sound effects editors); Richard Gould, Dee Selby (Foley editors); Ronni Brown, Margie O'Malley (Foley artists) |

=== 2020s ===
| Year | Film | Winners/Nominees |
|---|---|---|
| 2020 | Greyhound | Warren Shaw, Michael Minkler, Will Digby (supervising sound editors); Ann Scibelli, Jon Title (sound designers); Odin Benitez, Jason King, Richard Kitting (sound effects editors); Luke Gibleon (Foley editor); Marko Costanzo (Foley artist) |
| 2020 | Cherry | Mark Binder (supervising sound editor); Matthew Coby, Donald Flick, Michael Gilbert (sound effects editors) |
| 2020 | The Midnight Sky | Randy Thom (supervising sound editor/sound designer); Bjørn Schroeder (supervising sound editor); Kyrsten Mate (additional sound designer); Leff Lefferts (sound effects editor); Nicholas Docter (Foley editor); Shelley Roden, John Roesch (Foley artists) |
| 2020 | News of the World | Oliver Tarney (supervising sound editor); Mike Fentum (sound designer); Dawn Gough, Kevin Penney (sound effects editors); Hugo Adams (Foley editor); Oliver Ferris, Sue Harding, Andrea King (Foley artists) |
| 2020 | Sound of Metal | Nicolas Becker (supervising sound editor), Carolina Santana (sound effects editor), Pietu Korhonen (Foley editor), Heikke Kossi (Foley artist) |
| 2020 | Tenet | Richard King (supervising sound editor/sound designer); Joseph Fraioli, Mark Larry, Michael W. Mitchell (sound effects editors); Angela Ang, Bruce Tanis (Foley editors); John Cucci, Catherine Harper, Alyson Dee Moore, Chris Moriana, Dan O'Connell, Shelley Roden, John Roesch, Katie Rose (Foley artists) |
| 2020 | Wonder Woman 1984 | Richard King (supervising sound editor/sound designer); Jimmy Boyle (supervising sound editor); Michael Babcock, Jeff Sawyer, Rowan Watson (sound effects editors); Lily Blazewicz, Kevin Penney (Foley editors); Peter Burgess, Zoe Freed (Foley artists) |
| 2021 | Dune | Theo Green, Mark Mangini (supervising sound editors/sound designers); Dave Whitehead (sound designer); Phil Barrie, Greg Ten Bosch, Lee Gilmore, Robert Kellough, Piero Mura (sound effects editors); Christopher Bonis (Foley editor); Sandra Fox, Goro Koyama, Andy Malcolm (Foley artists) |
| 2021 | Belfast | Simon Chase, James Mather (supervising sound editors); Tomas Blazukas (sound editor); Arthur Graley (Foley editor); Oliver Ferris, Sue Harding (Foley artists) |
| 2021 | The Matrix Resurrections | Dane A. Davis, Stephanie Flack (supervising sound editors); Albert Gasser, Laurent Kossayan, Eric Lindemann, Jeremy Peirson, Michael Schapiro, Markus Stemler, Bryan O. Watkins, Caron Weidner (sound effects editors); Frank Kruse, Kuen Il Song (Foley editors); Daniel Weiss (Foley artist) |
| 2021 | Nightmare Alley | Nathan Robitaille (supervising sound editor); Dashen Naidoo (sound effects editor); Chelsea Body (Foley editor); Goro Koyama, Andy Malcolm (Foley artist) |
| 2021 | No Time to Die | James Harrison, Oliver Tarney (supervising sound editors); Bryan Bowen, Eilam Hoffman (sound designers); Dawn Gough (sound effects editor); Hugo Adams (Foley editor); Sue Harding, Andrea King (Foley artists) |
| 2021 | A Quiet Place Part II | Ethan Van der Ryn, Erik Aadahl (supervising sound editors/sound designers); Malte Bieler, Brandon Jones (sound designers); Matt Cavanaugh, Chris Diebold (sound effects editors); Jonathan Klein (Foley editor); Steve Baine, Peter Persaud (Foley editors) |
| 2021 | Spider-Man: No Way Home | Steven Ticknor, Vanessa Lapato (supervising sound editors), Tony Lamberti, Ken McGill, Chris Diebold (sound designers); Jessica Parks (supervising Foley editor); Sam Fan, Jamie Hardt, Justin M. Davey, Chris Jacobson, Takako Ishikawa (sound effects editors); Sam Nacach (Foley editor); Gary Hecker, Adam DeCoster (Foley artists) |
| 2022 | Top Gun: Maverick | Al Nelson (supervising sound editor/sound designer); James Mather, Bjørn Ole Schroeder (supervising sound editors); Christopher Boyes, Benjamin A. Burtt, Scott Guitteau, Jed Loughran, Rowan Watson, Qianbaihui Yang (sound effects editors); Luke Dunn Gielmuda (supervising Foley editor); Dmitri Makarov, David Mackie (Foley editors); Jana Vance, Ronni Brown, John Roesch, Shelley Roden (Foley artists) |
| 2022 | Avatar: The Way of Water | Christopher Boyes (supervising sound editor/sound designer/re-recording mixer); David Chrastka, Dave Whitehead (sound designers); Hayden Collow, Matt Stutter (sound effects editors); Gwendolyn Yates Whittle, Brent Burge (supervising sound editors); Craig Tomlinson, Dee Selby (Foley editors); Dan O'Connell, John Cucci (Foley artist) |
| 2022 | The Batman | Will Files, Douglas Murray (supervising sound editors/sound designers); Chris Terhune, Lee Gilmore, Craig Henighan (sound designers); Diego Perez, Phil Barrie (sound effects editors) |
| 2022 | Black Adam | Bill R. Dean (supervising sound editor); Bruce Tanis (supervising Foley editor); Erick Ocampo, Dane A. Davis, Richard King, David Werntz, Harry Cohen, Tim Walston, Ann Scibelli (sound designers); Mitch Osias, D. Chris Smith, Ando Johnson, Greg Ten Bosch, Bryan O. Watkins (sound designers/sound effects editors); Diego Perez, Christopher Battaglia (sound effects editors); Mark Pappas (Foley editor); Alyson Dee Moore, Christopher Moriana, Patricia Nedd Doski (Foley artists) |
| 2022 | Everything Everywhere All at Once | Brent Kiser (supervising sound editor) |
| 2022 | Jurassic World Dominion | Al Nelson, Gwendolyn Yates Whittle (supervising sound editors/sound designers); Pete Horner, Gary Rydstrom (sound designers); Stuart McCowan, Benjamin A. Burtt, Scott Guitteau, Qianbaihui Yang (sound effects editor); Luke Dunn Gielmuda (supervising Foley editor); Coya Elliott (Foley editor); Jana Vance, Ronni Brown (Foley artists) |
| 2022 | Nope | Johnnie Burn (supervising sound editor); Simon Carroll, Brendan Feeney, Max Behrens, Ben Gulvin, Jeff Smith, Beresford Cookman (sound effects editors); Natalia Lubowiecka, Ewa Mazurkiewicz (Foley editors); Jacek Wisniewski (Foley artist) |
| 2023 | Oppenheimer | Richard King (supervising sound editor/sound designer); Randy Torres (sound designer); Christopher Flick (supervising Foley editor); Michael Mitchell (sound effects editor); Dan O'Connell, John Cucci (Foley artists) |
| 2023 | Gran Turismo | Kami Asgar, Erin Oakley (supervising sound editors); Charles Deenen, Tim Gedemer (sound designers); Sam Fan, Matt Cavanaugh (sound effects editors); Jessica Parks (Foley editor); Gary Hecker, Mike Horton (Foley artists) |
| 2023 | Ferrari | Tony Lamberti, Bernard Weiser (supervising sound editors); David Wentz (sound designer); Beso Kacharava (supervising Foley editor); Brent Findley, Steven Ticknor, Benjamin Cook (sound effects editors); Alexander Sanikidze, Rati Chkhetiani (Foley editors); Biko Gogaladze (Foley artist) |
| 2023 | John Wick: Chapter 4 | Paul Soucek (supervising sound editor); Mark P. Stoeckinger, Luke Gibleon, Olivia Xiao'ou Zhang, Stephen Robinson, Gael Nicolas (sound designers); Casey Genton, Nicolas Interlandi (sound effects editors) |
| 2023 | The Killer | Jeremy Molod (supervising sound editor); Ren Klyce (sound designer); Thom Brennan (supervising Foley editor); Jonathon Stevens, Malcolm Fife (sound effects editors); Dee Selby (Foley editor); Shelley Roden, John Roesch (Foley artists) |
| 2023 | Napoleon | Oliver Tarney, James Harrison (supervising sound editors); Mike Fentum, Hugo Adams (sound designers); Aran Clifford, Kevin Penney, Rowan Watson (sound effects editors); Oliver Ferris, Sue Harding (Foley artists) |
| 2024 | Dune: Part Two | Richard King (supervising sound editor/sound designer); Dave Whitehead, Michael Babcock, Lee Gilmore, Randy Tores (sound designers); Brent Burge, Hayden Collow, Melanie Graham, Michael Mitchell, Jeff Sawyer, Matt Stutter, Chris Terhune (sound effects editors); Chris Flick (supervising foley editor); Willard Overstreet (Foley editor); John Cucci, Dan O'Connell (Foley artists) |
| 2024 | Alien: Romulus | Will Files, Lee Gilmore (supervising sound editors/sound designers); Chris Terhune(sound designer); Luis Galdames, Dan Kenyon, Ken McGill, James Miller, Matt "Smokey" Cloud, Steve Neal (sound effects editors); Samuel Munoz, Lyndsey Schenk (Foley editors); Jacob McNaughton, Noel Vought (Foley artists) |
| 2024 | Deadpool & Wolverine | Ryan Cole, Craig Henighaner (supervising sound editors); Samson Nelsund, Eric. A. Norris, Addison Teague (sound designers); Lee Gilmore, J.R. Grubbs (sound effects editors); Pete Persaud, Gina Wark (Foley editors); Steve Baine (Foley artist) |
| 2024 | Furiosa: A Mad Max Saga | Robert Mackenzie (supervising sound editor); James Ashton (sound designer); Tom Heuzenroeder, Tara Webb, Jessica Meier (sound effects editors); Duncan Campbell, Adrian Medhurst (Foley editors) |
| 2024 | Nosferatu | Damian Volpe (supervising sound editor); Michael Fentum, Damian Volpe (sound designers); Samir Foco, Mariusz Glabinski (sound effects editors); Joel Raabe (Foley editor); Heikki Kossi, Shelley Roden (Foley artists) |
| 2024 | September 5 | Frank Kruse (sound effects editor/sound designer); Uwe Zillner (Foley supervisor/Foley artist); Johanna Rellinghaus, Benedikt Uebe (Foley editors) |
| 2025 | Frankenstein | Nathan Robitaille (supervising sound editor/sound designer); Paul Germann, Scott Hitchon, Craig MacLellan, Dashen Naidoo(sound effects editors); Jenna Dalla Riva, Chelsea Body (Foley editors); Goro Koyama, Sandra Fox (Foley artists) |
| 2025 | Anemone | Steve Fanagan (supervising sound editor/sound designer); James Tebbitt (Foley editor); Caoimhe Doyle (Foley artist) |
| 2025 | F1 | Al Nelson, Gwendolyn Yates Whittle (supervising sound editors/sound designers); Thom Brennan (Foley supervisor); Benjamin A. Burtt, Kim B. Christensen, Luke Dunn Gielmuda, Scott Guitteau (sound effects editors); Sean England, Heikki Kossi, Shelley Roden (Foley artists) |
| 2025 | One Battle After Another | Christopher Scarabosio (supervising sound editor/sound designer/re-recording mixer); Justin Doyle, Jeremy Mold (sound effects editors); Jenna Dalla Riva, Colton Maddigan, Kevin Jung (Foley editors); Steve Hammond, Goro Koyama, Sandra Fox M.P.S.E., Davi Aquino (Foley artists) |
| 2025 | Sinners | Benjamin A. Burtt (supervising sound editor); Steve Boeddeker (sound designer); Willard Overstreet (supervising Foley editor); David C. Hughes (sound effects editor); Alyson Dee Moore, Katie Rose (Foley artists) |
