= HPA Award for Outstanding Sound – Feature Film =

Annual award given by the Hollywood Professional Association

The Hollywood Professional Association Award for Outstanding Sound in a Feature Film is an annual award, given by the Hollywood Professional Association (HPA) to post-production workers in the film and television industry, in this case sound. First awarded in 2006, it has been presented every year since. From 2006 to 2009, the category was titled HPA Award for Outstanding Audio Post - Feature Film.

== Winners and nominees ==
- †† – indicates the winner of both the Academy Award for Best Sound Editing and Academy Award for Best Sound Mixing.
- ‡‡ – indicates nominations for both the Academy Award for Best Sound Editing and Academy Award for Best Sound Mixing.
- †‡ – indicates a winner of the Academy Award for Best Sound Editing and a nominee for the Academy Award for Best Sound Mixing
- ‡ – indicates a nomination for the Academy Award for Best Sound Editing

=== 2000s ===
Outstanding Audio Post - Feature Film

Year	Film	Winners/Nominees
2006	Flightplan	Dave McMoyler, Michael Minkler, Myron Nettinga
2006	The Producers	Lon Bender, Lee Dichter
2007	The Bourne Ultimatum ††	Karen Baker Landers, Per Hallberg, Scott Millan, David Parker
2007	Meet the Robinsons	David E. Fluhr, Myron Nettinga, Todd Toon
2008	WALL-E ‡‡	Ben Burtt, Tom Myers, Michael Semanick, Matthew Wood
2008	Into the Wild	Michael Minkler, Lora Hirschberg, Martin Hernández
2008	Wanted ‡‡	Wylie Stateman, Harry Cohen, Chris Jenkins, Frank A. Montaño
2009	Watchmen	Chris Jenkins, Frank A. Montaño, Scott Hecker, Eric A. Norris
2009	Quantum of Solace	Eddy Joseph, James Boyle
2009	Up ‡‡	E.J. Holowicki, Tom Myers, Michael Silvers, Michael Semanick

=== 2010s ===
Outstanding Sound - Feature Film

Year	Film	Winners/Nominees
2010	District 9	Chris Ward, Brent Burge (supervising sound editors); Michael Hedges, Gilbert Lake (re-recording mixers)
2010	The Book of Eli	Steven D. Williams, Eric A. Norris (sound designers/supervising sound editors); Chris Jenkins, Frank A. Montaño (re-recording mixers)
2010	Inception ††	Richard King (sound designer/supervising sound editor); Lora Hirschberg, Gary Rizzo (re-recording mixers)
2010	The Princess and the Frog	Odin Benitez (sound designer/supervising sound editor); David E. Fluhr, Dean Zupanic (re-recording mixers)
2010	Toy Story 3 ‡‡	Tom Myers (re-recording mixer/sound designer/supervising sound editor), Michael Silvers (supervising sound editor), Michael Semanick (re-recording mixer)
2011	Green Lantern	Per Hallberg, Karen Baker Landers (supervising sound editors); John T. Reitz, Gregg Rudloff, Rick Kline (re-recording mixers)
2011	Cars 2	Tom Myers (re-recording mixer/sound designer/supervising sound editor), Michael Silvers (supervising sound editor), Michael Semanick (re-recording mixer)
2011	Fast Five	Peter Brown (sound designer/supervising sound editor); Jon Taylor, Frank A. Montaño (re-recording mixers)
2011	Sucker Punch	Scott Heccker, Eric A. Norris (sound designers/supervising sound editors); Chris Jenkins, Frank A. Montaño (re-recording mixers)
2011	True Grit ‡‡	Skip Lievsay, Craig Berkey (re-recording mixers/supervising sound editors); Greg Orloff (re-recording mixer)
2012	The Adventures of Tintin	Chris Ward, Brent Burge (supervising sound editors); Christopher Boyes, Michael Hedges, Andy Nelson (re-recording mixers)
2012	Brave	Gwendolyn Yates Whittle (supervising sound editor), E.J. Holowicki (sound designer), Gary Rydstrom (re-recording mixer/sound designer), Tom Johnson (re-recording mixer)
2012	Extremely Loud & Incredibly Close	Blake Leyh (supervising sound editor); Eliza Paley (supervising dialogue editor); Skip Lievsay, Paul Urmson (re-recording mixers)
2012	The Hunger Games	Lon Bender (sound designer/supervising sound editor); Bill R. Dean, Kris Fenske (sound designers); Glynna Grimala (supervising dialogue editor); Michael Keller, Mike Prestwood Smith (re-recording mixers)
2012	Safe House	Per Hallberg (supervising sound editor); Chris Jenkins, Frank A. Montaño (re-recording mixers); Nico Louw, Conrad Kuhne (production sound mixers)
2013	Argo ‡‡	Erik Aadahl, Ethan Van der Ryn (sound designers/supervising sound editors); John T. Reitz, Gregg Rudloff (re-recording mixers)
2013	Gangster Squad	Cameron Frankley (sound designer/supervising sound editor); Jason W. Jennings (sound designer); Dean Zupanic, Jon Taylor (re-recording mixers)
2013	Iron Man 3	Mark Stoeckinger, Andrew DeCristofaro (supervising sound editors); Michael Keller, Mike Prestwood Smith (re-recording mixers)
2013	Pacific Rim	Scott Martin Gershin (sound designer/supervising sound editor); Tim LeBlanc, John T. Reitz, Gregg Rudloff (re-recording mixers)
2013	Turbo	Richard King (supervising sound editor); Andy Nelson, Michael Babcock (re-recording mixers); Nico Louw, Conrad Kuhne (production sound mixers)
2014	Gravity ††	Glenn Freemantle (sound designer/supervising sound editor); Skip Lievsay, Christopher Benstead, Niv Adiri (re-recording mixers)
2014	Frozen	Odin Benitez (sound designer/supervising sound editor), David E. Fluhr (re-recording mixer), Gabriel Guy (re-recording mixer/original dialogue mixer)
2014	Godzilla	Erik Aadahl, Ethan Van der Ryn (sound designers/supervising sound editors); Tim LeBlanc, John T. Reitz, Rick Kline (re-recording mixers)
2014	The Hunger Games: Catching Fire	Jeremy Peirson (re-recording mixer/sound designer/supervising sound editor), Skip Lievsay (re-recording mixer)
2014	Noah	Craig Henighan (re-recording mixer/supervising sound editor), Skip Lievsay (re-recording mixer), Jill Purdy (supervising dialogue editor)
2015	American Sniper †‡	Alan Robert Murray (supervising sound editor); Tom Ozanich (sound designer); John T. Reitz, Gregg Rudloff (re-recording mixers)
2015	Birdman or (The Unexpected Virtue of Ignorance) ‡‡	Martin Hernández, Aaron Glascock (sound designers/supervising sound editors); Jon Taylor, Frank A. Montaño (re-recording mixers)
2015	Interstellar ‡‡	Richard King (sound designer/supervising sound editors); Gary Rizzo, Gregg Landaker (re-recording mixers); Mark Weingarten (production sound mixer)
2015	Mad Max: Fury Road ††	Mark Mangini, Scott Hecker (supervising sound editors); Chris Jenkins, Gregg Rudloff (re-recording mixers)
2015	Unbroken ‡‡	Becky Sullivan, Andrew DeCristofaro (supervising dialogue editors); Jon Taylor, Frank A. Montaño (re-recording mixers)
2016	Sicario ‡	Alan Robert Murray (supervising sound editor), Tom Ozanich (re-recording mixer/sound designer), John T. Reitz (re-recording mixer)
2016	Batman v Superman: Dawn of Justice	Scott Hecker (supervising sound editor); Chris Jenkins, Michael Keller (re-recording mixers)
2016	Eye in the Sky	Bill R. Dean (supervising sound editor/sound designer), Craig Mann (re-recording mixer/supervising sound editor), Adam Jenkins (re-recording mixer), Chase Keehn (dialogue editor)
2016	Room	Niall Brady (supervising dialogue editor), Steve Fanagan (re-recording mixer/sound designer), Ken Galvin (re-recording mixer)
2016	Zootopia	Addison Teague (sound designer/supervising sound editor), David E. Fluhr (re-recording mixer), Gabriel Guy (re-recording mixer/original dialogue mixer)
2017	Guardians of the Galaxy Vol. 2	Addison Teague, David Acord (sound designers/supervising sound editors), Christopher Boyes, Lora Hirschberg (re-recording mixers)
2017	Doctor Strange	Shannon Mills, Daniel Laurie (supervising sound editors); Tom Johnson, Juan Peralta (re-recording mixers)
2017	The Fate of the Furious	Peter Brown, Mark Stoeckinger (supervising sound editors); Paul Aulicino (assistant supervising sound editor); Stephen P. Robinson (sound designer), Bobbi Banks (supervising adr editor)
2017	John Wick: Chapter 2	Mark Stoeckinger (supervising sound editor); Alan Rankin (sound designer/supervising sound editor); Andy Koyama, Martyn Zub, Gabriel J. Serrano (re-recording mixers)
2017	Sully ‡	Alan Robert Murray, Bub Asman (supervising sound editors); John T. Reitz (re-recording mixer); Tom Ozanich (re-recording mixer/sound designer)
2018	The Shape of Water ‡‡	Nelson Ferreira, Nathan Robitaille (supervising sound editors); Christian Cooke, Brad Zoern (re-recording mixers)
2018	Ant-Man and the Wasp	Addison Teague, Katy Wood (supervising sound editors); Tom Johnson, Juan Peralta (re-recording mixers)
2018	Avengers: Infinity War	Shannon Mills, Daniel Laurie (supervising sound editors); Tom Johnson, Juan Peralta (re-recording mixers)
2018	Black Panther ‡‡	Benjamin A. Burtt (supervising sound editor), Steve Boeddeker (supervising sound editor/re-recording mixer), Brandon Proctor (re-recording mixer)
2018	Blade Runner 2049 ‡‡	Mark Mangini (supervising sound editor); Theo Green (sound designer); Mac Ruth (production sound mixer); Ron Bartlett, Doug Hemphill (re-recording mixers)
2019	Godzilla: King of the Monsters	Erik Aadahl (sound designer/supervising sound editor); Jason W. Jennings, Nancy Nugent (supervising sound editors); Tim LeBlanc, Tom Ozanich (re-recording mixers)
2019	Aquaman	Eliot Connors, Stephen P. Robinson (sound designers); Joe Dzuban (sound designer/re-recording mixer); Peter Brown (supervising sound editor); Tim LeBlanc (re-recording mixer)
2019	Roma ‡‡	Sergio Diaz (sound designer/supervising sound editor), Skip Lievsay (sound designer/supervising sound editor/re-recording mixer), Ruy García (supervising adr editor), Craig Henighan (re-recording mixer), Carlos Honc (dialogue editor), Caleb Townsend (music editor)
2019	Shazam!	Bill R. Dean (sound designer/supervising sound editor); Erick Ocampo (sound designer); Kelly Oxford (supervising adr editor); Michael Keller, Kevin O'Connell (re-recording mixers)
2019	Smallfoot	Michael Babcock (sound designer/supervising sound editor/re-recording mixer), Chris Diebold (sound effects editor), Harrison Meyle (dialogue supervisor), Jeff Sawyer (foley supervisor), David E. Fluhr (re-recording mixer)
