= Wild Angels =

Wild Angels may refer to:

- Wild Angels (film), a 1969 Croatian film directed by Fadil Hadžić
- The Wild Angels, a 1966 film starring Peter Fonda
- The Wild Angels (band), an English rock and roll group
- Wild Angels (album), an album by Martina McBride
- Wild Angels, an album by Mary Anne Hobbs
- The Wild Angels, a soundtrack album by Davie Allan & the Arrows
- Wild Angels (song), a 1995 song by Martina McBride

== See also ==
- "Wild Wild Angels", a 1976 song by Smokie
