= George Watters II =

Sound Editor

- Born: George Duncan Watters; September 19, 1949 (age 76); Los Angeles, California
- Occupation: Sound editor
- Years active: 1978–2011

George Watters II (born September 19, 1949) is an American retired sound editor with more than 80 feature film credits. He has won the Academy Award for Best Sound Editing twice, for The Hunt for Red October (1990) and for Pearl Harbor (2001).

Watters entered the film industry in 1973 as an apprentice in the Television Sound Editing Department at Paramount Pictures. Following his apprenticeship, he became an assistant sound editor for feature films at Paramount; in a 2012 interview, he said, "At that time I had the opportunity to work a bit in picture editing and music editing, but I found I preferred sound FX editing. Sound is sculptural, imaginative, universal and for me the most creative medium." Watters' first credit as a Supervising Sound Editor was for American Hot Wax (1978). Watters worked at Paramount Studios until 1992. In his interview, Watters singled out his long relationship with Jerry Bruckheimer. Bruckheimer produced twenty-five out of thirty of the films for which Watters was the sound editor, from Flashdance (1983) through Pirates of the Caribbean: On Stranger Tides (2011).

In 2012, Watters received the Career Achievement Award of the Motion Picture Sound Editors (MPSE), which is an honorary society of sound editors based in the United States.

== Oscar Nominations ==
All of these are in Best Sound Editing.

- 1986 Academy Awards-Nominated for Top Gun. Nomination shared with Cecelia Hall. Lost to Aliens.
- 1990 Academy Awards-The Hunt for Red October. Shared with Cecelia Hall. Won.
- 1991 Academy Awards-Nominated for Star Trek VI: The Undiscovered Country. Nomination shared with F. Hudson Miller. Lost to Terminator 2: Judgment Day.
- 1995 Academy Awards-Nominated for Crimson Tide. Lost to Braveheart.
- 1998 Academy Awards-Nominated for Armageddon. Lost to Saving Private Ryan.
- 2001 Academy Awards-Pearl Harbor. Shared with Christopher Boyes. Won.
- 2003 Academy Awards-Nominated for Pirates of the Caribbean: The Curse of the Black Pearl. Nomination shared with Christopher Boyes. Lost to Master and Commander: The Far Side of the World.
- 2006 Academy Awards-Nominated for Pirates of the Caribbean: Dead Man's Chest. Nomination shared with Christopher Boyes. Lost to Letters from Iwo Jima.
