= The Hidan of Maukbeiangjow =

The Hidan of Maukbeiangjow (1985: Invasion of the Girl Snatchers)
- VHS cover for 1985 re-release
- Directed by: Lee Jones
- Written by: Don Elkins; Carla Rueckert
- Produced by: Don Elkins; Lee Jones; Jeffrey C. Hogue (1985 re-release)
- Cinematography: Lee Jones
- Edited by: Bub Asman; Lee Jones
- Music by: James DeWitt
- Production companies: Atlantis Films; L & L Company
- Distributed by: Atlantis Films; 1985 re-release: Majestic International Pictures; VCI Home Video (VHS)
- Release date: 1973
- Running time: 93 minutes
- Country: United States
- Language: English

The Hidan of Maukbeiangjow is a 1973 exploitation film written by Don Elkins and Carla Rueckert and directed and filmed by Lee Jones. As a sci-fi/comedy/action film. It was re-released as Invasion of the Girl Snatchers in the mid-1980s under the 'Le Bad Cinema' line. and then again on VHS in 1999.

In the film, an investigation into a kidnapping ring leads to humanoid aliens. They are killing their victims, and replacing them with alien look-alikes. The film is based on tales of alien abduction.

== Synopsis ==
Kaspar (Ele Grigsby) is partnered with Detective Sam Trowel (Hugh Smith). He locates the hideout of a kidnapping and drug ring that Trowel has been unable to find because he is too focused on procedures. Trowel hires safecracker Frederick Fenzer (David Roster) and his bodyguard, Noname (Harlo Cayse), as phoney suppliers to set up Ruthie (Carla Rueckert) to be kidnapped by the ring. She is supposed to wear a tracking device in her bra, but she is taken before she can put it on. Fortunately, Kaspar already knows where the hideout is.

At the compound, named the 'Hidan of Maukbeiangjow', Ruthie is killed and replaced with a confused alien. This is supervised by the sorcerer Aph (Charles Rubin), who is a slave to an evil alien named Utaya (McCain Jeeves). Aph accidentally led Utaya to Earth. Another humanoid alien (Pepper Thurston), teaches the replacement Ruthie how to function in her new body. She also kidnaps Trowel so his body could to be used by Utaya.

Freddie's brother "Junior" (Paul Lenzi) shows up to deliver his brother's stash of marijuana and give Aph's apprentice, Prudence (Elizabeth Rush), a hard time. Prudence and Kaspar end up bound together by the alien Ruthie.

Utaya wants Fenzer's help in stealing a billion dollars. He also wants Kaspar's body ready as a back-up vessel, since the dead are usually vapid and confused or become zombies. Junior attempts to catch and rape Prudence, but she shoots him after a lengthy chase. Freddie complains that Utaya is simply Trowel high on junk, and puffing his joint complains, "I don't work with nobody (puff) who ain't straight!" Trowel/Utaya is killed in battle, as are most of the kidnapping ring. Meanwhile, romance has blossomed between Prudence and Kaspar, so Aph gives the couple a ride in his convertible.

== Partial cast ==
- Elizabeth Rush as Prudence
- Ele Grigsby as Kaspar
- David Roster as Frederick 'Freddie Fingers' Fenzer, Jr.
- Paul Lenzi as Frederick 'Junior' Fenzer, Jr.
- Charles Rubin as Aph
- Hugh Smith as Sam Trowel / Utaya II
- McCain Jeeves as Utaya I
- Harlo Cayse as Noname
- Carla Rueckert as Ruthie (as Ellen Tripp)
- Ruth Horn as Bunny / Rosebush
- James Rueckert as Zombie
- Lee Boylan as ... Higgie

== See also ==
- List of American films of 1973
