= Cecelia Hall (sound editor) =

American sound designer

- Other names: Cece Hall
- Occupation: Sound editor
- Years active: 1977–2010

Cecelia Hall (Cece Hall) is an Oscar-winning sound designer and sound editor. She became the first woman to be nominated for an Academy Award for Best Sound Effects Editing in 1986 for Top Gun and went on to win the Oscar for The Hunt for Red October, a 1990 film for which she also received a nomination for the BAFTA Award for Best Sound at the 44th British Academy Film Awards.

== Career ==
In 1984, Hall was elected the first woman president of the Motion Picture Sound Editors and served on the executive committee of the Sound Branch of the Academy of Motion Picture Arts and Sciences from 1988 to 1995.

In 1995, Hall was invited to teach at the University of California, Los Angeles (UCLA) Graduate School of Theatre, Film and Television/Media; she remains the only professor teaching sound design. Hall has also taken residencies at Savannah College of Art and Design (SCAD) and California State University, Monterey Bay, taught master classes in sound in London, and participated in numerous panels and seminars on sound design.

Hall has been the subject of numerous interviews and articles on sound design and women working in Hollywood. She is profiled in Sound Design for Film, Working in Hollywood, The Women Who Run Hollywood, and The Editors Guild Magazine. Hall is featured in the 2019 documentary Making Waves: The Art of Cinematic Sound.

== Awards and nominations ==
- 1980 Motion Picture Sound Editors (MPSE) Awards – nominated for Star Trek: The Motion Picture
- 1983 MPSE Awards – nominated for Star Trek II: The Wrath of Khan
- 1985 MPSE Awards – nominated for Star Trek III: The Search For Spock
- 1985 MPSE Awards – nominated for Beverly Hills Cop.
- 1986 MPSE Awards – nominated for Witness.
- 1987 Academy Awards – shared nomination with George Watters II for Top Gun
- 1987 MPSE Awards – shared nomination with George Watters II for Top Gun
- 1990 MPSE Awards – nominated for Harlem Nights
- 1991 MPSE Awards – shared nomination with George Watters II for The Hunt for Red October
- 1991 MPSE Awards – nominated for Days of Thunder
- 1991 Academy Awards – won, shared with George Watters II, for The Hunt for Red October
- 1991 BAFTAs – shared nomination with George Watters II for The Hunt for Red October

== Selected filmography ==
- Addams Family Values (1993)
- Patriot Games (1992)
- The Addams Family (1991)
- Days of Thunder (1990)
- The Hunt for Red October (1990)
- Big Top Pee-wee (1988)
- Beverly Hills Cop II (1987)
- The Golden Child (1986)
- Top Gun (1986)
- Pee-wee's Big Adventure (1985)
- Witness (1985)
- Beverly Hills Cop (1984)
- Star Trek III: The Search for Spock (1984)
- Flashdance (1983)
- Terms of Endearment (1983)
- Airplane II: The Sequel (1982)
- Star Trek II: The Wrath of Khan (1982)
- Star Trek: The Motion Picture (1979)
