= Aaron Glascock =

Sound editor

- Occupation: sound editor
- Years active: 1984-present

Aaron Glascock is a sound editor.

Glascock was nominated for an Academy Award for Best Sound Editing at the 87th Academy Awards for his work on the film Birdman or (The Unexpected Virtue of Ignorance), his nomination was shared with Martin Hernández.

== Career ==
He has worked on over 70 films.
