= Steve Boeddeker =

American sound editor

- Occupation: sound editor
- Years active: 1995–present

Steve Boeddeker is a sound editor. Boeddeker and supervising sound editor Richard Hymns were nominated for an Academy Award for Best Sound Editing for the film All Is Lost (2013).

== Filmography ==
- Monkeybone (2001) Sound Designer
- Sing (2016) Sound Designer/Additional Re-Recording Mixer
- Frequency (2000) Sound Designer
- Hellboy (2004) Sound Designer/Interviewed on "Making of"
- Hart's War (2002) Sound Designer/Re-Recording Mixer (as Stephen Boedekker)
- Drive Angry (2011) Sound Designer (as Steve "Falcon" Boedekker)
- Charlie and the Chocolate Factory (2005) Sound Designer
- Star Wars: The Clone Wars (2011–12) Sound Effects Editor (Seasons 4 and 5)/Re-Recording Mixer (Season 4, Episodes 15-17)
- Contact (1997) Sound Effects Editor
- The Nun (2018) Sound Designer
- Hemingway & Gellhorn (2012) Sound Effects Editor (Emmy Award for Outstanding Sound Editing for a Miniseries, Movie, or Special: Miniseries)
- Naqoyqatsi (2002) Sound Designer (as Steven Boeddeker)/Re-Recording Mixer (according to skysound.com)
- Se7en (1995) Assistant Sound Effects Editor/Assistant Sound Designer
- All Is Lost (2013) Supervising Sound Editor/Sound Designer/Re-Recording Mixer (Academy Award Nomination for Best Sound Editing)
- Starship Troopers 2: Hero of the Federation (2004) Sound Designer/Supervising Sound Editor/Re-Recording Mixer
- Mars Attacks! (1996) Assistant Sound Designer
- The Village (2004) Supervising Sound Editor/Sound Designer
- Pixels (2015) Sound Designer/Re-Recording Mixer
- Paranorman (2012) Sound Designer
- The Avengers (2012) Sound Effects Editor
- Be Home Soon: Letters From My Grandfather (2012) Sound Designer (according to official site)/Sound Effects Editor (according to IMDb)
- Chain Reaction (1996) Assistant Sound Designer
- The Game (1997) Conforming Editor
- The Frighteners (1996) Sound Effects Editor
- Lincoln (2012) Additional Re-Recording Mixer
- Now You See Me (2013) Sound Designer/Re-Recording Mixer
- Maleficent (2014) Sound Designer until replaced by Tim Nielsen
- The Company You Keep (2012) Sound Designer/Re-Recording Mixer
- Alice in Wonderland (2010) Sound Designer/Supervising Sound Editor
- Fight Club (1999) Sound Effects Editor
- Beasts of the Southern Wild (2012) Sound Designer/Sound Effects Editor/Re-Recording Mixer
- Hand of God (2014) Sound Designer
- Lara Croft: Tomb Raider (2001) Sound Designer/Supervising Sound Editor
- Lara Croft Tomb Raider: The Cradle of Life (2003) Sound Designer/Supervising Sound Editor
- Rules of Engagement (1999) Sound Designer/Supervising Sound Editor
- The Hunted (2003) Sound Designer
- Kraven the Hunter (2024) Sound Designer
- Sinners (2025) Sound Designer/Re-Recording Mixer
- Toy Story that Time Forgot (2014) Sound Designer
- Jinn (2014) Sound Designer/Re-Recording Mixer
- Silent (2014) Sound Designer/Sound Editor
- The Touch (2002) Sound Designer/Re-Recording Mixer
- X-Men (2000) Sound Designer
- The Horse Whisperer (1998) Sound Designer
- Mimic (1997) Sound Designer
- Armageddon (1998) Sound Editor
- The Faculty (1998) Sound Designer
- Halloween H20: 20 Years Later (1998) Sound Designer
- Lake Placid (1999) Sound Designer
- Dracula 2000 (2000) Sound Designer/Music Composer
- The Exorcist (1977, 1998 re-release) Sound Designer/Music Composer
- The Eye (2008) Additional Sound Designer
- Project Arbiter (2014) Sound Supervisor/Re-Recording Mixer (according to official site)
- Sweeney Todd: The Demon Barber of Fleet Street (2007) Sound Designer
- Daredevil (2003) Sound Designer/Special Thanks on "Making of"
- Black Panther (2018) Sound Designer/Supervising Sound Editor/Re-Recording Mixer
- Maanokoobiyo (2013) Sound Designer
- American Express ad with M. Night Shyamalan (2006) - Sound Designer
- The Corpse Bride (2005) Sound Designer
- Tron Legacy (2010) Sound Designer
- Killer Joe (2011) Sound Designer/Writer of "Led Pud"
- Coraline (2009) Sound Effects Editor
- Lady in the Water (2006) Sound Designer
- LUV (2011) Sound Designer
- My Bloody Valentine 3D (2009) Sound Designer
- The Kite Runner (2007) Sound Designer
- I Origins (2014) Sound Designer/Supervising Sound Editor/Re-Recording Mixer
- Journey of Hanuman (2013) Sound Effects Editor
- From Hell (2001) Sound Designer (as Steven Boedecker)
- The 13th Warrior (1999) Sound Effects Editor (as Steve Boedecker)
- 54 (1998) Sound Designer
- Dogma (1999) Additional Music/The Producers would like to thank
- The Prophecy 3: The Ascent (2000) Music Composer
