= David A. Whittaker =

American sound effects editor (born 1952)

- Born: November 11, 1952 (age 73); Long Beach, California, USA
- Other names: Dave Whiitaker; Dave Whittaker; David Whittaker
- Occupation: sound effects editor
- Years active: 1977-present

David A. Whittaker (born November 11, 1952) is an American sound effects editor. He was nominated at the 69th Academy Awards for the film Daylight for the category of Best Sound Editing, he shared his nomination with Richard L. Anderson.

He has over 150 credits to date.
