= Stephen Hunter Flick =

American sound editor (born 1949)

- Born: June 21, 1949 (age 77); Evanston, Illinois, USA
- Other names: Stephen Flick, Stephen H. Flick
- Occupation: Sound editor
- Years active: 1977-2015

Stephen Hunter Flick (born June 21, 1949, in Evanston, Illinois) is an American retired sound editor with over 170 film credits.

== Oscar Nominations ==
All of these are in Best Sound Editing, with one being a Special achievement award.

- 1982 Academy Awards-nominated for Poltergeist, nomination shared with Richard L. Anderson. Lost to E.T. the Extra-Terrestrial.
- 1987 Academy Awards-Received the Special Achievement Academy Award for RoboCop. Shared the award with John Pospisil.
- 1988 Academy Awards-Nominated for Die Hard. Nomination shared with Richard Shorr. Lost to Who Framed Roger Rabbit.
- 1990 Academy Awards-Nominated for Total Recall. Lost to The Hunt for Red October.
- 1994 Academy Awards-Speed. Won.
