= Richard L. Anderson (sound effects editor) =

American sound effects editor

- Occupation: Sound effects editor
- Years active: 1972-present

Richard L. Anderson is an American sound effects editor, best known for Raiders of the Lost Ark. He has been nominated twice for sound editing, and received a Special Achievement Academy Award in 1981. He has nearly 140 film credits since his start in 1972.

In April 2017, Anderson partnered with Pro Sound Effects to release The Odyssey Collection, developed from his personal sound library built throughout his career with partner Mark Mangini.

In 2026, Anderson is making his first directing debut swampy creature horror feature film Wekiwa, starring Billy Zane, Kevin Chapman, C.S. Lee, and Alex Garfin. Production began in early September 2026 around Orange County and Orlando, Florida.

== Oscar history ==
- 1981 Academy Awards-Special Achievement Academy Award for Raiders of the Lost Ark. Shared with Ben Burtt.
- 1982 Academy Awards-nominated for Best Sound Editing for Poltergeist, nomination shared with Stephen Hunter Flick. Lost to E.T. the Extra-Terrestrial.
- 1996 Academy Awards-nominated for Best Sound Editing for Daylight. Nomination shared with David A. Whittaker. Lost to The Ghost and the Darkness.

== Selected filmography ==
- Wekiwa (TBA)
- Jack the Giant Slayer (2013)
- Hop (2011)
- New Year's Eve (2011)
- Valentine's Day (2010)
- Imagine That (2009)
- The Spiderwick Chronicles (2008)
- Blades of Glory (2007)
- Shrek the Third (2007)
- Flushed Away (2006)
- Over the Hedge (2006)
- Madagascar (2005)
- Monster-in-Law (2005)
- Anchorman: The Legend of Ron Burgundy (2004)
- Shark Tale (2004)
- Brother Bear (2003)
- Legally Blonde 2: Red, White & Blonde (2003)
- The Majestic (2001)
- Planet of the Apes (2001)
- Cats & Dogs (2001)
- Disney's The Kid (2000)
- The Flintstones in Viva Rock Vegas (2000)
- Being John Malkovich (1999)
- Sleepy Hollow (1999)
- Virus (1999)
- Antz (1998)
- Lethal Weapon 4 (1998)
- Anastasia (1997)
- Conspiracy Theory (1997)
- Dante's Peak (1997)
- Daylight (1996)
- Dragonheart (1996)
- Apollo 13 (1995)
- The Lion King (1994)
- The Nightmare Before Christmas (1993)
- Batman Returns (1992)
- Hoffa (1992)
- Edward Scissorhands (1990)
- Tremors (1990)
- K-9 (1989)
- Cocktail (1988)
- Beetlejuice (1988)
- Predator (1987)
- The Color Purple (1985)
- The Goonies (1985)
- Gremlins (1984)
- D.C. Cab (1983)
- 48 Hrs. (1982)
- Poltergeist (1982)
- Raiders of the Lost Ark (1981)
- The Final Countdown (1980)
- Star Trek: The Motion Picture (1979)
- Star Wars (1977)
