= Alan Robert Murray =

American sound editor (1954–2021)

- Born: July 30, 1954
- Died: February 24, 2021 (aged 66); Los Angeles, California, U.S.
- Occupation: Sound editor
- Years active: 1978–2021

Alan Robert Murray (July 30, 1954 – February 24, 2021) was an American sound editor.

Murray was nominated for ten Academy Awards. In 2007, Murray won the Academy Award for Best Sound Editing for his work on Letters from Iwo Jima (2005). In 2015, Murray won his second Academy Award for Best Sound Editing for his work on American Sniper (2014). He shared both awards with Bub Asman. Murray earned his tenth nomination at the 92nd Academy Awards for Best Sound Editing for Joker, setting record for the Sound Editing category. He died in Los Angeles on February 24, 2021, at age 66.

== Academy Awards ==
With ten nominations, Alan Robert Murray has set a record for becoming the most-nominated sound editor for the Academy Award for Best Sound Editing category, surpassed Richard Hymns with nine nominations.

| Year | Film | Collaborator | Result |
|---|---|---|---|
| 1986 (58th) | Ladyhawke | Robert G. Henderson | Nominated |
| 1990 (62nd) | Lethal Weapon 2 | Robert G. Henderson | Nominated |
| 1997 (69th) | Eraser | Bub Asman | Nominated |
| 2001 (73rd) | Space Cowboys | Bub Asman | Nominated |
| 2007 (79th) | Letters from Iwo Jima | Bub Asman | Won |
| 2007 (79th) | Flags of Our Fathers | Bub Asman | Nominated |
| 2015 (87th) | American Sniper | Bub Asman | Won |
| 2016 (88th) | Sicario | — | Nominated |
| 2017 (89th) | Sully | Bub Asman | Nominated |
| 2020 (92nd) | Joker | - | Nominated |
