= Richard Shorr =

American sound editor

- Born: Richard Jay Shorr; November 24, 1942; New York City, New York, USA
- Died: August 13, 2001 (aged 58); Paris, France
- Occupation: Sound editor
- Years active: 1974-2001

Richard Shorr (November 24, 1942 – August 13, 2001) was an American sound editor who was nominated at the Academy Awards for Best Sound Editing. He was nominated for Die Hard, which he shared the nomination with Stephen Hunter Flick. The nomination was at the 61st Academy Awards.

== Selected filmography ==
- Highlander II: The Quickening (1992)
- Shipwrecked (1991)
- Teenage Mutant Ninja Turtles (1990)
- Die Hard (1988)
- Poltergeist III (1988)
- Predator (1987)
