= Robert G. Henderson =

American sound editor

- Born: Robert George Henderson
- Other names: Robert Henderson; Bob Henderson; Bob G. Henderson
- Occupation: Sound editor
- Years active: 1967-1996

Robert G. Henderson is an American retired sound editor. He got his start on the TV series Hogan's Heroes.

== Oscar Nominations ==
Both of these are in Best Sound Editing.

- 1985 Academy Awards-Nominated for Ladyhawke. Nomination shared with Alan Robert Murray. Lost to Back to the Future.
- 1989 Academy Awards-Nominated for Lethal Weapon 2. Nomination shared with Alan Robert Murray. Lost to Indiana Jones and the Last Crusade.

== Selected filmography ==
- Executive Decision (1996)
- The Fan (1996)
- Assassins (1995)
- Bad Boys (1995)
- Maverick (1994)
- Demolition Man (1993)
- True Romance (1993)
- Lethal Weapon 3 (1992)
- Passenger 57 (1992)
- Radio Flyer (1992)
- The Last Boy Scout (1991)
- New Jack City (1991)
- Die Hard 2 (1990)
- Hard to Kill (1990)
- The Rookie (1990)
- Lethal Weapon 2 (1989)
- Pink Cadillac (1989)
- Bird (1988)
- The Dead Pool (1988)
- Scrooged (1988)

Above the Law (1988)

- Fatal Attraction (1987)
- Lethal Weapon (1987)
- Heartbreak Ridge (1986)
- Ladyhawke (1985)
- Pale Rider (1985)
- National Lampoon's Vacation (1983)
- Sudden Impact (1983)
- Firefox (1982)
