= Scott Hecker =

- Occupation: Sound editor
- Years active: 1978–present

Scott Hecker is a supervising sound editor/designer who has over 100 film credits to date. He was nominated at the 75th Academy Awards for the film Road to Perdition in the category of Best Sound Editing.

He has won six times at the Motion Picture Sound Editors awards.

He won an Australian Academy Award (AACTA) for Best Sound on “Mad Max: Fury Road” in 2015.

He also was nominated for an Emmy Award for the sound on Miami Vice.
