= Addison Teague =

American sound editor

- Occupation: Sound editor
- Years active: 1993–present

Addison Teague is an American sound editor who has done sound editing on 42 films since 1993. He was nominated for an Academy Award during the 83rd Academy Awards for the film Tron: Legacy. This was for Best Sound Editing, his nomination was shared with Gwendolyn Yates Whittle.

He also is a member of Skywalker Sound.

== Selected filmography ==
- The Secret Life of Pets 2 (2019)
- Ant-Man and the Wasp (2018)
- Ralph Breaks the Internet (2018)
- Zootopia (2016)
- The Amazing Spider-Man 2 (2014)
- Big Hero 6 (2014)
- The Lone Ranger (2013)
- The Amazing Spider-Man (2012)
- Rango (2011)
- Tron: Legacy (2010)
- Avatar (2009)
- Indiana Jones and the Kingdom of the Crystal Skull (2008)
- Pirates of the Caribbean: At World's End (2007)
- Pirates of the Caribbean: Dead Man's Chest (2006)
- Munich (2005)
- War of the Worlds (2005)
- Hellboy (2004)
- The Lord of the Rings: The Return of the King (2003)
- Pirates of the Caribbean: The Curse of the Black Pearl (2003)
- The Ring (2002)
- Lara Croft: Tomb Raider (2001)
- The Mexican (2001)
- Mystery Men (1999)
- Play It to the Bone (1999)
