= Mark Stoeckinger =

American sound editor

- Other names: Mark P. Stoeckinger; Mark B. Stoeckinger
- Occupation: Sound editor

Mark Stoeckinger is an American sound editor. He has over 80 film credits. In addition to 3 Oscar nominations, he has been nominated for the Motion Picture Sound Editors a total of 10 times, winning once with Gladiator.

== Oscar Nominations ==
All of these are in Best Sound Editing.

- 70th Academy Awards-Nominated for Face/Off. Nomination shared with Per Hallberg. Lost to Titanic.
- 82nd Academy Awards-Nominated for Star Trek. Nomination shared with Alan Rankin. Lost to The Hurt Locker.
- 83rd Academy Awards-Nominated for Unstoppable. Lost to Inception.
