= Ethan Van der Ryn =

American sound editor

- Born: Alameda, California, USA
- Occupation: Sound editor
- Years active: 1986–present

Ethan Van der Ryn is an American sound designer and sound editor.

== Career ==
He won two Academy Awards for Best Sound Editing for The Lord of the Rings: The Two Towers and King Kong. He earned further Academy Awards nominations for Transformers (2007), Transformers: Dark of the Moon (2011), Argo (2012), and A Quiet Place (2018). He is an alumnus of San Francisco State University.
