= Martin Hernández =

Mexican sound editor and designer

- Born: 1 June 1964 (age 62); Mexico City, Mexico
- Other name: Martín Hernández
- Occupations: Sound editor; Sound designer
- Years active: 1998–present

Martin Hernández (born 1 June 1964) is a Mexican sound editor and designer. He was nominated for two Academy Awards for his work on the films Birdman (2014) and The Revenant (2015), the latter of which also earned him a British Academy Film Award.

== Awards and nominations ==
Major awards

=== Academy Awards ===
Year	Category	Nominated work	Result	Ref.
2015	Best Sound Editing	Birdman	Nominated	
2016	Best Sound Editing	The Revenant	Nominated	

=== British Academy Film Awards ===
Year	Category	Nominated work	Result	Ref.
2007	Best Sound	Babel	Nominated	
2007	Best Sound	Pan's Labyrinth	Nominated	
2015	Best Sound	Birdman	Nominated	
2016	Best Sound	The Revenant	Won	

=== Ariel Awards ===
Year	Category	Nominated work	Result
2001	Best Sound	Amores perros	Won
2005	Best Sound	Voces inocentes	Nominated
2007	Best Sound	Crónicas	Nominated
2007	Best Sound	Pan's Labyrinth	Nominated
2008	Best Sound	Cobrador: In God We Trust	Nominated
2008	Best Sound	Silent Light	Nominated
2009	Best Sound	Rudo y Cursi	Nominated
2013	Best Sound	La vida precoz y breve de Sabina Rivas	Nominated
2018	Best Sound	Tigers Are Not Afraid	Nominated

=== Golden Reel Awards ===
Year	Category	Nominated work	Result
2004	Outstanding Achievement in Sound Editing – Sound Effects, Foley, Dialogue and ADR for Foreign Language Feature Film	City of God	Won
2007	Outstanding Achievement in Sound Editing – Sound Effects, Foley, Dialogue and ADR for Foreign Language Feature Film	Pan's Labyrinth	Won
2007	Outstanding Achievement in Sound Editing – Sound Effects, Foley, Dialogue and ADR for Foreign Language Feature Film	Babel	Nominated
2009	Outstanding Achievement in Sound Editing – Sound Effects, Foley, Dialogue and ADR for Foreign Language Feature Film	Hellboy II: The Golden Army	Nominated
2011	Outstanding Achievement in Sound Editing – Sound Effects, Foley, Dialogue and ADR for Foreign Language Feature Film	Biutiful	Nominated
2015	Outstanding Achievement in Sound Editing – Dialogue and ADR for Feature Film	Birdman	Nominated
2015	Outstanding Achievement in Sound Editing – Sound Effects and Foley for Feature Film	Birdman	Nominated
2015	Outstanding Achievement in Sound Editing – Feature Underscore	Birdman	Won
2016	Outstanding Achievement in Sound Editing – Dialogue and ADR for Feature Film	The Revenant	Nominated
2016	Outstanding Achievement in Sound Editing – Sound Effects and Foley for Feature Film	The Revenant	Won
2016	Outstanding Achievement in Sound Editing – Feature Underscore	The Revenant	Nominated
2018	Outstanding Achievement in Sound Editing – Sound Effects, Foley, Music, Dialogue and ADR for Special Venue	Flesh and Sand	Won

=== Goya Awards ===
Year	Category	Nominated work	Result
2007	Best Sound	Pan's Labyrinth	Won

=== Satellite Awards ===
Year	Category	Nominated work	Result
2006	Best Sound	Babel	Nominated
