= Andrew DeCristofaro =

- Occupation: sound editor
- Years active: 1993–present

Andrew DeCristofaro is a sound editor.

DeCristofaro was nominated for an Academy Award for Best Sound Editing at the 87th Academy Awards for his work on the film Unbroken. His nomination was shared with Becky Sullivan.
