= Becky Sullivan =

Sound editor

- Born: Rebecca Sullivan
- Other names: Becky Sullivan Coblentz; Becky Coblentz
- Occupation: sound editor
- Years active: 1986-present

Becky Sullivan is a Supervising Sound Editor. She won the BAFTA for her work on the film The Fugitive. Sullivan was nominated at the 87th Academy Awards in the category of Best Sound Editing for her work on the film Unbroken. Her nomination was shared with Andrew DeCristofaro.
