= Skip Lievsay =

American sound designer

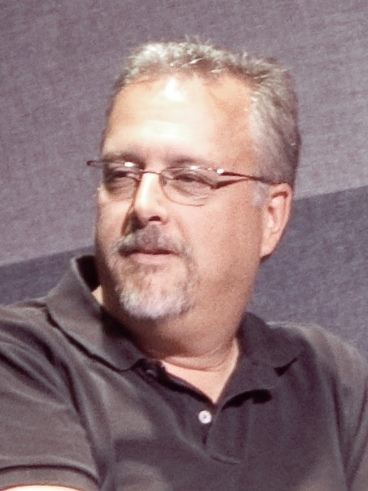
- Lievsay in 2009
- Occupations: Supervising sound editor, Re-recording mixer
- Years active: 1981 – present

Skip Lievsay is an American supervising sound editor, re-recording mixer and sound designer for film and television, Lievsay has worked with filmmakers and directors including Alfonso Cuarón, the Coen brothers, Martin Scorsese, Spike Lee, Jonathan Demme and Robert Altman.

In January 2008, he received two Oscar nominations—for Best Sound Mixing and Best Sound Editing—for his work on Joel and Ethan Coen's No Country for Old Men. In 2011, he was nominated in the same categories for the film True Grit.

In 2014, he won the Academy Award for Best Sound Mixing for Gravity; he was also nominated in the same category for the film Inside Llewyn Davis that same year, and was also nominated for that same category and for Best Sound Editing for Roma in 2019.
