= Benjamin A. Burtt =

American sound editor

Benjamin A. Burtt (born 1984), also known as Benny Burtt and Ben Burtt Jr., is an American sound editor for Skywalker Sound.

The son of Ben Burtt, Benjamin A. Burtt grew up in Northern California, and first worked in film when he was in high school, as an assistant to his father on Star Wars: Episode II – Attack of the Clones. He provided the vocal effects of the Velociraptors Blue, Charlie, Delta and Echo in the Jurassic World trilogy. He was nominated for the Academy Award for Best Sound Editing for his work on Black Panther.
