= F. Hudson Miller =

F. Hudson Miller is a motion picture sound editor and designer for feature films in Hollywood California.

== Career ==
Miller's credits include Déjà Vu, National Treasure, Man on Fire, Patriot Games, The Chronicles of Narnia: The Lion, the Witch and the Wardrobe, Armageddon, and Star Trek VI: The Undiscovered Country. In 1991, he was nominated for an Academy Award in Sound Effects Editing for Star Trek VI: The Undiscovered Country. He has also worked on five other films that received Academy Award nominations, of which The Hunt for Red October and Pearl Harbor each won the Oscar.

Hudson's other professional activities include eight years on the Board of Directors of the Motion Picture Editor's Guild nine years as Vice President of the Motion Picture Sound Editors (the professional organization of sound and music editors). In 2005 he joined the Motion Picture Advisory Board of the Interlochen Center for the Arts.

In 2007, Miller partnered with Suhail F. Kafity to form Rhapsody Post, a motion picture sound editorial company.

He is also the author of "The Outsourcer's Apprentice" in the Editors Guild Magazine.
