= Richard King (sound designer) =

American film sound designer and editor (born 1940)

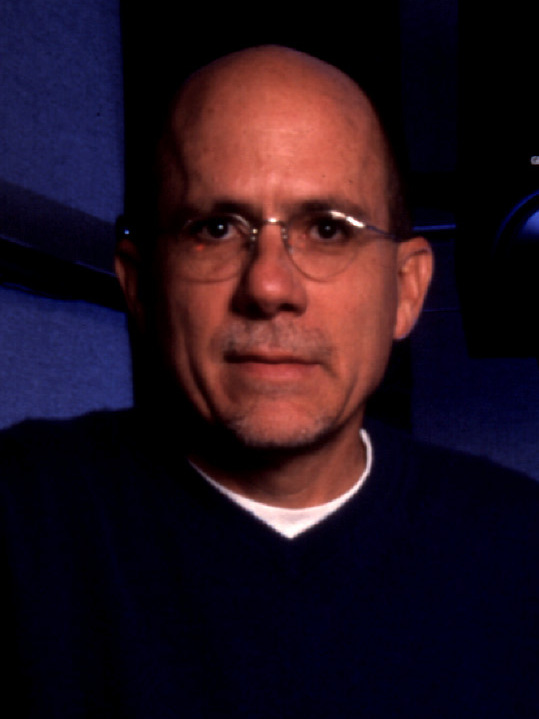
- Born: Tampa, Florida, U.S.
- Occupations: Sound designer and sound editor
- Years active: 1985–present

Richard King is an American film sound designer and editor who has worked on over 100 feature films. A native of Tampa, Florida, he graduated from the University of South Florida with a BFA in painting and film. He has won Academy Awards for Best Sound Editing for the films Master and Commander: The Far Side of the World (2003), The Dark Knight (2008), Inception (2010), Dunkirk (2017) and the Academy Award for Best Sound for Dune: Part Two (2024). He was also nominated for War of the Worlds (2005), Interstellar (2014), Oppenheimer (2023), and Maestro (2023). He has won BAFTA awards for Master and Commander: The Far Side of the World (2003), Inception (2010), Dunkirk (2017), and Dune: Part Two (2024). He has won eight MPSE awards for Best Sound Editing & Design, as well as the MPSE Career Achievement Award (2016).
