= Bub Asman =

American sound editor

- Born: August 17, 1949 (age 76); Louisville, Kentucky
- Occupation: sound editor
- Years active: 1973-present
- Relatives: John Asman (brother)

Bub Asman (born August 17, 1949, in Louisville, Kentucky) is a sound editor known for his collaborations with director Clint Eastwood. He and his colleagues on the 2006 film Letters from Iwo Jima won the Academy Award for Best Sound Editing, and were nominated the same year for Flags of Our Fathers. He also won for the 2014 film American Sniper. He shared both awards with Alan Robert Murray.

He is a brother of cinematographer William L. Asman and re-recording mixer John Asman. He began his career (with brother John) as a film editor on Lee Jones' The Hidan of Maukbeiangjow (1973) and films of William Girdler.
