= Alan Rankin =

- Occupation: Sound editor
- Years active: 1992–present

Alan Rankin is an American sound editor. He was nominated at the 82nd Academy Awards for Star Trek in the category of Best Sound Editing, his nomination was shared with Mark Stoeckinger.

He also works for video games such as Resident Evil 4. He is a member of Todd Soundelux.

== Selected filmography ==
- Iron Man 3 (2013)
- Jack Reacher (2012)
- Prometheus (2012)
- Unstoppable (2010)
- Star Trek (2009)
- Mission: Impossible III (2006)
- The Day After Tomorrow (2004)
- 2 Fast 2 Furious (2003)
- The Italian Job (2003)
- The Last Samurai (2003)
- Windtalkers (2002)
- The 6th Day (2000)
- Final Destination (2000)
- Mission: Impossible 2 (2000)
- Supernova (2000)
- Vertical Limit (2000)
- American Beauty (1999)
- Godzilla (1998)
- Courage Under Fire (1996)
- The Hunchback of Notre Dame (1996)
- Heat (1995)
- Congo (1995)
- Outbreak (1995)
- Pocahontas (1995)
- Dennis the Menace (1993)
- In the Line of Fire (1993)
- Home Alone 2: Lost in New York (1992)
