= Wild Angels (film) =

Wild Angels (Divlji anđeli) is a 1969 Croatian language Yugoslav film directed by Fadil Hadžić, starring Božidar Orešković, Mladen Crnobrnja and Igor Galo.

== Plot ==
Inspired by crime movies, three young men decide to rob a store. With the stolen money, they go to a seaside resort to have some fun, but after a while the police tracks them down.
