= Craig Berkey =

Canadian sound engineer

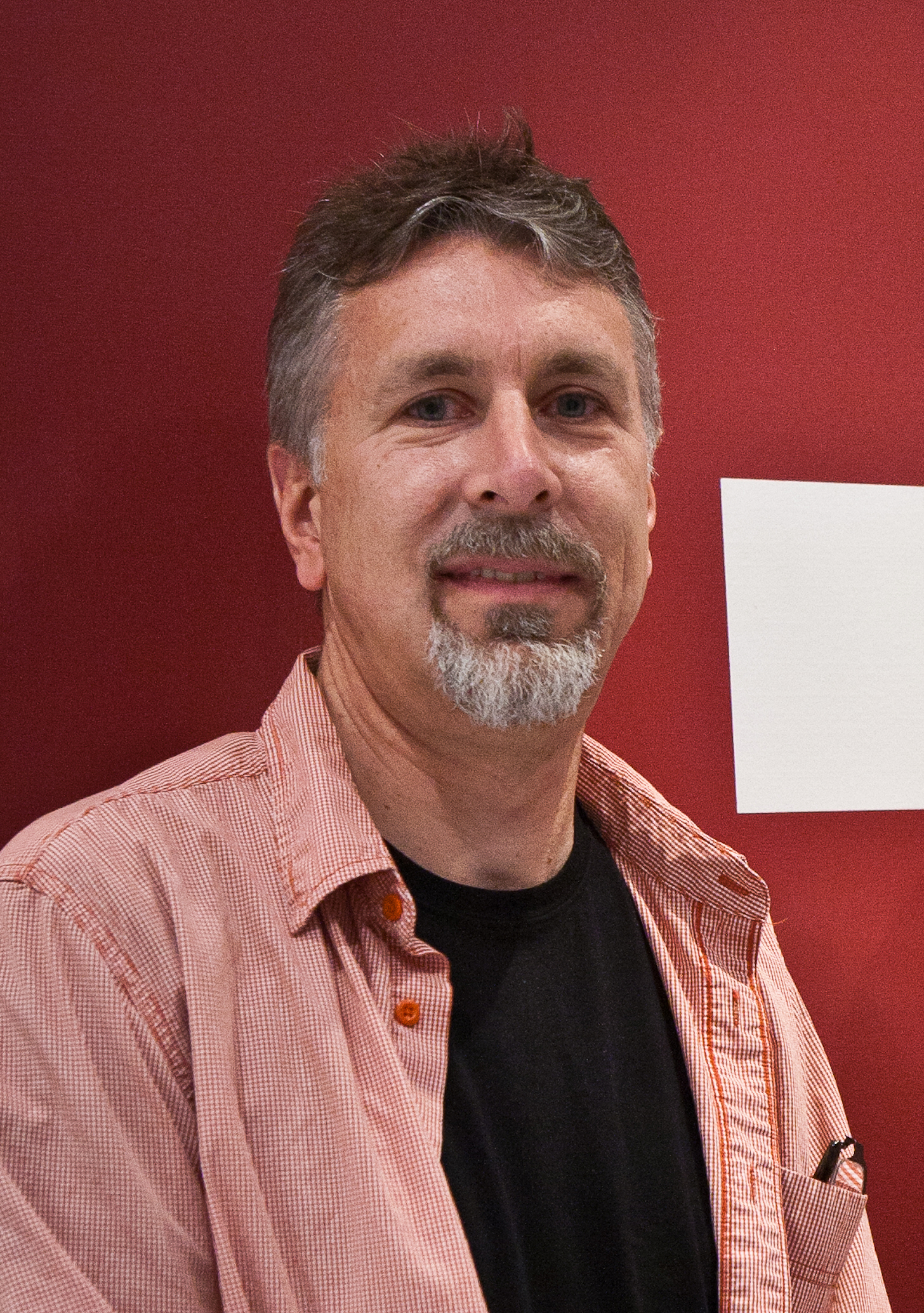
- Born: June 18, 1962 (age 63); Burnaby, British Columbia, Canada
- Occupation: Sound engineer
- Years active: 1990-present

Craig Berkey (born June 18, 1962) is a Canadian sound engineer. He has been nominated for three Academy Awards. He has worked on over 80 films since 1990, when he relocated to Los Angeles.

== Selected filmography ==
- No Country for Old Men (2007) - Best Sound Mixing
- True Grit (2010) - Sound Editing and Best Sound Mixing
