= Erik Aadahl =

American sound editor

- Occupation: Sound editor
- Years active: 1998–present
- Known for: Providing Godzilla's roar.

Erik Aadahl is an American sound editor. He is best known for his role in creating Godzilla's iconic roar in the 2014 film of the same name. He also voiced Bumblebee in Transformers: The Last Knight.

== Early life and education ==
He graduated from the University of Southern California's School of Cinematic Arts in 1998.

== Career ==
Aadahl worked on all seven of the Transformer movies. He served as the supervising sound editor on Transformers: Dark of the Moon, for which he was nominated for an Academy Award and also voiced Bumblebee in Transformers: The Last Knight. Aadahl also worked on Godzilla's "roar" in the 2014 Godzilla film He was the sound editor for A Quiet Place and The Creator alongside Ethan Van der Ryn.
