= Richard Hymns =

English sound editor

- Born: 18 July 1947 (age 78); England
- Occupation: Sound editor

Richard Hymns (born 18 July 1947) is an English sound editor. He won three Academy Awards for his work on Indiana Jones and the Last Crusade, Jurassic Park and Saving Private Ryan. He was also nominated for nine more in the category Best Sound Editing, including one for the 1999 film Fight Club.

On 24 January 2012, he was nominated for an Academy Award for the film War Horse.
