= Christopher Boyes =

American sound engineer

- Born: 1972 (age 53–54); United Kingdom
- Occupation: Sound engineer
- Years active: 1991–present

Christopher Boyes is an American sound engineer. He has won four Academy Awards and has been nominated for another eleven. He has worked on more than 100 films since 1991.

== Academy Awards ==
Boyes has won four Academy Awards and has been nominated for another nine:

Wins

- Titanic (Best Sound Effects Editing) (1997)
- Pearl Harbor (Best Sound Editing) (2001)
- The Lord of the Rings: The Return of the King (Best Sound Mixing) (2003)
- King Kong (Best Sound Mixing) (2005)

Nominations

- The Lord of the Rings: The Fellowship of the Ring (Best Sound) (2001)
- The Lord of the Rings: The Two Towers (Best Sound) (2002)
- Pirates of the Caribbean: The Curse of the Black Pearl (Best Sound Editing and Best Sound Mixing) (2003)
- Pirates of the Caribbean: Dead Man's Chest (Best Sound Editing and Best Sound Mixing) (2006)
- Iron Man (Best Sound Editing) (2008)
- Avatar (Best Sound Editing and Best Sound Mixing) (2009)
- The Hobbit: The Desolation of Smaug (Best Sound Mixing) (2013)
- Avatar: The Way of Water (Best Sound) (2022)
