= Golden Reel Award for Outstanding Achievement in Sound Editing – Sound Effects, Foley, Dialogue and ADR for Animated Feature Film =

Motion picture award for sound

- Country: United States
- Presented by: Motion Picture Sound Editors
- Currently held by: Jeremy Bowker (supervising sound editor/sound designer); Brad Semenoff (supervising dialogue editor); Stephen M. Davis, Earl Ghaffari (supervising music editors); Luke Dunn Gielmuda, Joel Raabe, Kimberly Patrick, Cameron Barker (sound effects editors); Jacob Riehle, Angela Ang (dialogue editors); Kendall Demarest (music editor); Jordan Myers (Foley editor); Ronni Brown, Sean England (Foley artists) – Zootopia 2 (2025)

The Golden Reel Award for Outstanding Achievement in Sound Editing – Sound Effects, Foley, Dialogue and ADR for Animated Feature Film is an annual award given by the Motion Picture Sound Editors. It honors sound editors whose work has warranted merit in the field of cinema; in this case, their work in the field of animated film.

== History ==
It was first awarded in 1989, for films released the previous year, under the title Best Sound Editing - Animated Feature. The award has been given with its current title since 2018.

== Winners and nominees ==
Notes: ≠ indicates an Academy Award for Best Sound winner while ± indicates a nominee for the same category

=== 1980s ===
Best Sound Editing - Animated Feature

Year	Film
1985	Rainbow Brite and the Star Stealer
1985	The Black Cauldron
1985	Here Come the Littles
1985	The Secret of the Sword
1985	Starchaser: The Legend of Orin
1986	An American Tail
1986	The Great Mouse Detective
1986	My Little Pony: The Movie
1986	Transformers
1988	Oliver & Company
1988	The Chipmunk Adventure
1988	The Land Before Time
1988	Pinocchio and the Emperor of the Night
1989	The Little Mermaid
1989	All Dogs Go to Heaven
1989	Babar: The Movie

=== 1990s ===
Year	Film	Winners/Nominees
1990	The Rescuers Down Under	
1990	DuckTales the Movie: Treasure of the Lost Lamp	
1990	Jetsons: The Movie	
1991	Beauty and the Beast	
1991	An American Tail: Fievel Goes West	
1991	Rover Dangerfield	
1992	Aladdin	
1992	Bebe's Kids	
1992	FernGully: The Last Rainforest	
1992	Little Nemo: Adventures in Slumberland	
1993	Once Upon a Forest	
1993	The Nightmare Before Christmas	
1993	Batman: Mask of the Phantasm	
1993	Tom and Jerry: The Movie	
1993	We're Back! A Dinosaur's Story	
1994	The Lion King	
1994	The Pagemaster	
1994	The Swan Princess	
1995	Toy Story	Gary Rydstrom (supervising sound editor/sound designer/re-recording mixer); Tim Holland (supervising sound editor); Pat Jackson (sound effects editor); Marilyn McCoppen (ADR editor); Mary Helen Leasman (Foley editor); Dennie Thorpe, Tom Barwick (Foley artists)
1995	Balto	
1995	Pocahontas	
1995	A Goofy Movie	
1995	The Thief and the Cobbler	
1996	The Hunchback of Notre Dame	John K. Carr
1996	All Dogs Go to Heaven II	
1997	Hercules	Tim Holland (supervising sound editor); Gary Rydstrom (sound designer); Marilyn McCoppen (supervising ADR editor/dialogue editor); John K. Carr, Pat Jackson, Jeff Jones (sound effects editors); James Melton (dialogue editor); Mary Helen Leasman, Marian Wilde (Foley editors)
1997	Aaron's Magic Village	
1997	Anastasia	
1997	Cats Don't Dance	
1997	The Swan Princess: Escape from Castle Mountain	
1998	A Bug's Life	Gary Rydstrom (supervising sound editor/sound designer/re-recording mixer); Tim Holland (supervising sound editor); Pat Jackson (sound effects editor); Michael Silvers (ADR editor); Mary Helen Leasman, Marian Wilde (Foley editors)
1998	Antz	
1998	I Married a Strange Person!	
1998	Mulan	
1998	The Prince of Egypt	
1998	Quest for Camelot	
1998	Rudolph the Red-Nosed Reindeer: The Movie	
1998	The Rugrats Movie	
1999	The Iron Giant	Randy Thom (supervising sound editor/sound designer); Dennis Leonard (supervising sound editor); Curt Schulkey (supervising dialogue editor); Beau Borders, Mary Helen Leasman (Foley editors); Yin Cantor, Andrea Gard, Joanna Laurent (sound effects editors); Dennie Thorpe, Jana Vance (Foley artists)
1999	Toy Story 2	Gary Rydstrom (supervising sound editor/sound designer/re-recording mixer); Tom Myers (sound designer); Michael Silvers (supervising sound editor/ADR editor); Shannon Mills (sound effects editor); Teresa Eckton, Bruce Lacey, Susan Sanford (Foley editors); Mary Helen Leasman (supervising Foley editor); Jonathan Null (ADR editor)
1999	Perfect Blue	Masafumi Mima (supervising sound editor); Les Claypool III (supervising dialogue editor); Shizuo Kurahashi (sound editor); Lia Sargent, Kevin Seymour (ADR editors)
1999	Pokémon: The First Movie	Daisuke Jinbo, Richard King (supervising sound editors); Ryôko Nashimoto (ADR editor)
1999	Princess Mononoke	Michihiro Itô (sound effects editor); Dan Edelstein, Warren Shaw (sound effects/Foley editors); Ernie Sheesley (ADR editor)
1999	South Park: Bigger, Longer & Uncut	Deb Adair, Bruce Howell (supervising sound editors); Christopher T. Welch (supervising dialogue/ADR editor); Christopher Flick (supervising Foley editor); Cameron Frankley, Randall Guth, Michael Jonascu, Lydia Quidilla, Brian Risner, Daniel Yale (sound effects editors); Evan T. Chen, Julie Feiner, Avram D. Gold, Joe Schiff (dialogue editors); Nancy MacLeod (Foley editor)
1999	Tarzan	Per Hallberg (supervising sound editor/sound designer); Curt Schulkey (supervising ADR editor); Craig S. Jaeger (supervising dialogue editor); Christopher Assells, Scott Martin Gershin, Lou Kleinman, Geoffrey G. Rubay, Peter Michael Sullivan (sound effects editors)
1999	The King and I	James Koford (supervising sound editor); Joe Campana, Paul Murphy (sound effects editors)

=== 2000s ===
Year	Film	Winners/Nominees
2000	Titan A.E.	Christopher Boyes (supervising sound editor/sound designer/re-recording mixer); Matthew Wood (supervising sound editor); Christopher Scarabosio (sound effects editor/field recordist); Michael Ferdie, Andrea Gard (sound effects editors); Scott Seymann (dialogue editor); Sandina Bailo-Lape, Susan Sanford (Foley editors)
2000	Chicken Run	James Mather (supervising sound editor/Foley editor); Graham Headicar (supervising sound editor); Danny Hambrook (sound effects editor); Tim Hands (dialogue editor)
2000	Dinosaur	Christopher Boyes (supervising sound editor/sound designer/re-recording mixer); Frank E. Eulner (supervising sound editor); Michele Perrone (supervising ADR editor); Andrea Gard, Scott Guitteau, Mark A. Hester, Ethan Van der Ryn (sound effects editors); Joanna Laurent, James Likowski, John Verbeck (Foley editors)
2000	The Emperor's New Groove	Tim Chau (supervising sound editor); Thomas Whiting (supervising ADR editor); Albert Gasser, Nils C. Jensen, David Kern, Donald Sylvester (sound effects editors)
2000	The Road to El Dorado	Gregory King (supervising sound editor); Yann Delpuech (supervising sound effects editor); Darren King (supervising ADR editor)
2000	Rugrats in Paris: The Movie	Cameron Frankley, Beth Sterner (supervising sound editors)

Best Sound Editing - Animated Feature Film, Domestic and Foreign

Year	Film	Winners/Nominees
2001	Atlantis: The Lost Empire	Gary Rydstrom (supervising sound editor/sound designer/re-recording mixer); Michael Silvers (supervising sound editor/ADR editor); Mary Helen Leasman (supervising Foley editor); John K. Carr, Ken Fischer, David C. Hughes, Shannon Mills (sound effects editors); Susan Sanford (Foley editor)
2001	Final Fantasy: The Spirits Within	Randy Thom (supervising sound editor/sound designer/re-recording mixer); Dennis Leonard (supervising sound editor); Andrea Gard (supervising Foley editor); Sue Fox (supervising ADR editor); David C. Hughes, Jim McKee, Christopher Scarabosio, Robert Shoup (sound effects editors); Ernie Cheesley (dialogue editor)
2001	Jimmy Neutron: Boy Genius	Christopher T. Welch (supervising sound editor); Scott Curtis (supervising Foley editor); David Grimaldi, Michael Jonascu, Chuck Michael, Paul N. J. Ottosson, Beth Sterner, Steve Tushar (sound effects editors); Tammy Fearing, Julie Feiner, Carol Lewis (dialogue editors); Fred Burke, Matthew Harrison (Foley editors)
2001	Monsters, Inc.±	Gary Rydstrom (supervising sound editor/sound designer/re-recording mixer); Michael Silvers (supervising sound editor); Karen G. Wilson (supervising Foley editor); Teresa Eckton, Stephen Kearney, Shannon Mills, Tom Myers (sound effects editors); Lindakay Brown (Foley editor)
2001	Osmosis Jones	Randy Thom (supervising sound editor/sound designer); Elliott Koretz (supervising sound editor); Curt Schulkey (co-supervising sound editor); Thom Brennan (supervising Foley editor); Mike Chock, Aaron Glascock, John Pospisil, Marvin Walowitz (sound effects editors); Michele Perrone (dialogue editor)
2001	Shrek	Wylie Stateman (supervising sound editor/sound designer); Lon Bender (supervising sound editor); Hugh Waddell (supervising ADR editor); Chris Jargo (supervising dialogue editor); Valerie Davidson, Scott Martin Gershin, Hector C. Gika, Tony Lamberti, Jennifer L. Mann, Branden Spencer, Wade Wilson (sound effects editors)

Best Sound Editing in Animated Features

Year	Film	Winners/Nominees
2002	Treasure Planet	Dane A. Davis (supervising sound editor); Julia Evershade (supervising sound/dialogue/ADR editor); Andrew Lackey (supervising Foley editor); Richard Adrian (sound effects editor)
2002	Ice Age	Sean Garnhart (supervising sound editor/sound designer); Steven Visscher (supervising Foley editor); Craig Berkey, Lewis Goldstein, Paul Urmson (sound effects editors); Kam Chan, Frank Kern (Foley editors); Albert Gasser, Kenton Jakub, Marissa Littlefield, Nicholas Renbeck (dialogue editors)
2002	Lilo & Stitch	Frank E. Eulner, Christopher Boyes (supervising sound editors/sound designers); Thomas Whiting (supervising dialogue/ADR editor); Scott Guitteau, Al Nelson, Christopher Scarabosio (sound effects editors); James Likowski, John Verbeck (Foley editors)
2002	Spirited Away	Petra Bach (supervising ADR editor); Michihiro Itô, Tôru Noguchi, Robert L. Sephton (sound editors)
2002	Spirit: Stallion of the Cimarron	Carmen Baker, Tim Chau (supervising sound editors); Jim Brookshire (supervising dialogue/ADR editor); Nils C. Jensen, Albert Gasser, David Kern, Piero Mura, Bruce Tanis (sound effects editors)
2002	The Wild Thornberrys Movie	Beth Sterner (supervising sound editor); Scott Curtis (supervising Foley editor); Carol Lewis (supervising dialogue editor); Noah Blough, Fred Burke, Ronald Eng, Tammy Fearing, David Grimaldi, Scott G.G. Haller, Chuck Michael, David E. Stone (sound effects editors)
2003	The Triplets of Belleville	Eric DeVos, Laurent Quaglio (sound editors)
2003	Brother Bear	Richard L. Anderson, Mike Chock (supervising sound editors); Reuben Simon (supervising Foley editor); Steve Lee, Piero Mura (sound effects editors)
2003	Finding Nemo±	Gary Rydstrom (supervising sound editor/sound designer/re-recording mixer); Michael Silvers (supervising sound editor); Al Nelson (Foley editor); Steve Slanec (supervising dialogue/ADR editor); Teresa Eckton, E.J. Holowicki, Shannon Mills, Dee Selby (sound effects editors)
2003	The Jungle Book 2	Petra Bach (supervising ADR editor); Michihiro Itô, Tôru Noguchi, Robert L. Sephton (sound effects editors)
2003	Millennium Actress	Masafumi Mima (supervising sound editor)
2003	Rugrats Go Wild	Beth Sterner (supervising sound editor); Willard Overstreet (supervising Foley editor), Carol Lewis (supervising dialogue/ADR editor); Chuck Michael, David E. Stone (sound effects editors); Fred Burke, Ed Callahan (Foley editors); Eliza Pollack Zebert (dialogue editor); Tammy Fearing (ADR editor)
2003	Sinbad: Legend of the Seven Seas	Charles L. Campbell, Richard C. Franklin (supervising sound editors); Mildred Iatrou Morgan, Christopher T. Welch (supervising ADR editors); Ronald Eng, Doug Jackson, Chuck Michael (sound effects editors); Bruce Richardson (Foley editor); Kimberly Ellen Lowe, Carin Rogers (dialogue editors)
2004	The Incredibles≠	Randy Thom (supervising sound editor/sound designer/re-recording mixer); Michael Silvers (supervising sound editor); Teresa Eckton, Kyrsten Mate (sound effects editors); Sue Fox, Al Nelson (Foley editors); Steve Slanec (ADR editor); Stephen M. Davis (music editor); Dennie Thorpe, Jana Vance, Ellen Heuer (Foley artists)
2004	Kaena: The Prophecy	Jake Eberle, Jonathan Miller (supervising sound editors); Nigel Galt (supervising Foley editor); Evan T. Chen (sound editor); Tom D. Backman (Foley editors); Andrew Patterson, Angie Stanghetti (dialogue editors)
2004	The Polar Express±	Randy Thom (supervising sound editor/sound designer/re-recording mixer); Dennis Leonard (supervising sound editor); Sue Fox (supervising Foley editor); Marilyn McCoppen (supervising dialogue/ADR editor); Will Files, Scott Guitteau, David C. Hughes, Jonathan Null, Larry Oatfield (sound effects editors); Kenneth Karman (music editor)
2004	Shark Tale	Richard L. Anderson (supervising sound editor/sound designer); Thomas Jones (supervising dialogue editor); Mark Binder, Mike Chock, Wade Wilson (sound effects editors); Mark Mangini (Foley editor); Ralph Osborn, David Williams (dialogue editors); Slamm Andrews (music editor)
2004	Shrek 2	Dennis Leonard (supervising sound editor); Randy Thom, David C. Hughes (sound designers); Andre Fenley, J.R. Grubbs, Scott Guitteau (sound effects editors); Marilyn McCoppen, Ewa Sztompke-Oatfield (ADR editors); Jonathan Null, Larry Oatfield (Foley editors); Mark Jan Wlodarkiewicz (music editor)
2004	Team America: World Police	Bruce Howell, Beth Sterner (supervising sound editors); Thomas W. Small (supervising Foley editor); Robert Ulrich (supervising ADR editor); Lydia Quidilla (supervising dialogue editor); Doug Jackson, Michael Kamper, Chuck Michael, Jon Title, Peter Zinda (sound effects editors); Cary Butler (sound effects/dialogue editor); Fred Burke, Scott Curtis (Foley editors); Nic Ratner (music editor)
2005	Wallace & Gromit: The Curse of the Were-Rabbit	James Mather (supervising sound editor); Danny Hambrook (sound designer); Joseph Stracey (sound designer/sound effects editor); Graham Headicar (sound effects editor); Tim Owens (dialogue/ADR editor); Simon Changer, Michael Connell (music editors); Peter Burgis, Andie Derrick, Derek Trigg (Foley artists)
2005	Chicken Little	Robert L. Sephton (supervising sound editor/sound designer); Christopher Flick (supervising Foley editor); Thomas Whiting (supervising ADR editor); Jeff Sawyer (sound effects/Foley editor); Adam Kopald (sound effects editor); Linda Folk (dialogue/ADR editor); Earl Ghaffari, Jim Harrison, Jeff Carson (music editors); John T. Cucci, Dan O'Connell (Foley artists)
2005	Tim Burton's Corpse Bride	Eddy Joseph (supervising sound editor); Steve Boeddeker, Martin Cantwell (sound designers); Harry Barnes (supervising Foley editor); Tony Currie (supervising dialogue editor); Simon Chase (Foley editor); Colin Ritchie (dialogue editor); Michael Higham, Shie Rozow (music editors); Paul Hanks, Ian Waggott (Foley artists)
2005	Howl's Moving Castle	Petra Bach (supervising ADR editor); Tôru Noguchi (sound editor); Yukio Hokari, Mizuki Ito, Masaya Kitada, Akihiko Okase (Foley artists)
2005	Madagascar	Richard L. Anderson (supervising sound editor/sound designer); Reuben Simon (supervising Foley editor); Thomas Jones (supervising dialogue/ADR editor); Mark Binder, David A. Whittaker, Wade Wilson (sound editors); Melissa Muik (music editors); John T. Cucci, Dan O'Connell (Foley artists)
2005	Robots	Sean Garnhart (supervising sound editor/sound designer); Steven Visscher (supervising Foley editor); Nicholas Renbeck (supervising dialogue/ADR editor); Paul Urmson, Wyatt Sprague (sound effects editors); Frank Kern (Foley editor); Marissa Littlefield (dialogue editor); Tom Carlson, Joshua Winget (music editors); Marko A. Costanzo, Jay Peck (Foley artists)

Best Sound Editing - Sound Effects, Foley, Dialogue and ADR for Feature Film Animation

Year	Film	Winners/Nominees
2006	Cars	Tom Myers (supervising sound editor/sound designer/re-recording mixer); Michael Silvers (supervising sound editor); Al Nelson, Teresa Eckton, Shannon Mills, Dee Selby (sound effects editors); Jonathan Null, Christopher Barrick (Foley editors); Bruno Coon (music editor); Ellen Heuer, Dennie Thorpe, Jana Vance (Foley artists);
2006	The Ant Bully	Mark Menza (supervising sound editor); Solange S. Schwalbe (supervising Foley editor); David Grimaldi, Randall Guth, Jason King, Chuck Michael, Bruce Tanis, Derek Vanderhorst, Bernard Weiser (sound effects editors); Val Kuklowsky (sound editors); Willard Overstreet (Foley editor); Alyson Dee Moore (Foley artist); Jeff Carson, Andrew Dorfman, Tanya Noel Hill (music editors)
2006	Flushed Away	Richard L. Anderson, Thomas Jones (supervising sound editors/sound designers); Mike Chock, Steve Lee, David A. Whittaker (sound effects editors); Ralph Osborn (dialogue editor); Thom Brennan (Foley editor); Catherine Harper, Christopher Moriana (Foley artists); Richard Whitfield (music editor)
2006	Happy Feet	Wayne Pashley (supervising sound editor/sound designer); Fabian Sanjurjo (supervising sound editor); Sonal Joshi (supervising dialogue editor); Damian Candusso, Rick Lisle, Derryn Pasquill, Angus Robertson (sound effects editors); Nick Breslin (dialogue/sound effects editor); Jenny T. Ward (dialogue editor); Jason Hancock, John Simpson (Foley artist); Thomas A. Carlson, Simon Leadley, Tim Ryan (music editors)
2006	Ice Age: The Meltdown	Randy Thom (supervising sound editor/sound designer/re-recording mixer) Douglas Murray (supervising sound editor); Sue Fox (supervising Foley editor); Gwendolyn Yates Whittle (supervising ADR editor); Will Files, David C. Hughes, Al Nelson, Christopher Scarabosio (sound effects editor); Samuel H. Hinckley (Foley editor); Stuart McCowan, Marshall Winn (ADR editors); Tom Carlson (music editor); Ellen Heuer, Dennie Thorpe, Jana Vance (Foley artists)
2006	Over the Hedge	Richard L. Anderson, Thomas Jones (supervising sound editors/sound designers); Reuben Simon (supervising Foley/sound editor); Mike Chock, Steve Lee, David A. Whittaker (sound effects editors); Slamm Andrews (music editor)
2007	Ratatouille±	Randy Thom (supervising sound editor/sound designer/re-recording mixer); Michael Silvers (supervising sound editor); Teresa Eckton, Kyrsten Mate (sound effects editors); Steve Slanec (ADR editor); Sue Fox, Al Nelson (Foley editors); Stephen M. Davis (music editor); Dennie Thorpe, Jana Vance, Ellen Heuer (Foley artists)
2007	Bee Movie	Will Files (supervising sound editor/sound designer); Michael Silvers (supervising sound editor); Randy Thom (sound designer); Luke Dunn Gielmuda (supervising Foley editor); J.J. George (supervising music editor); Scott Guitteau, Kyrsten Mate (sound effects editors); Steve Slanec (ADR editor); Kevin Crehan (music editor)
2007	Meet the Robinsons	Todd Toon (supervising sound editor/sound designer); David Kern (supervising Foley editor); G.W. Brown (supervising dialogue/ADR editor); Adam Kopald, Donald J. Malouf, Chuck Michael (sound effects editors); Charles W. Ritter (dialogue editor); Earl Ghaffari, Bill Abbott (music editors); Dan O'Connell, John T. Cucci (Foley artists);
2007	Persepolis	Samy Bardet, Thierry Lebon (supervising sound editor/sound designer); Eric Chevallier (supervising Foley editor)
2007	Shrek the Third	Richard L. Anderson, Thomas Jones (supervising sound editors/sound designers); Mark Binder (additional sound designer); Mike Chock, David A. Whittaker (sound effects editors); Michael Hertlein, Patrick Hogan (dialogue editors); Catherine Harper, Christopher Moriana (Foley artists); Richard Whitfield (music editor)
2007	The Simpsons Movie	Randy Thom (supervising sound editor/sound designer); Gwendolyn Yates Whittle (supervising sound editor); Christopher Scarabosio, Stuart McCowan, Luke Dunn Gielmuda, Chuck Michael, Shannon Mills, Al Nelson, Robert Shoup (sound effects editors); Sue Fox (Foley editor); Cheryl Nardi (dialogue editor); Daniel Pinder (music editor); Dennie Thorpe, Jana Vance, Ellen Heuer (Foley artists)
2007	Surf's Up	Steven Ticknor (supervising sound editor); Martin Lopez (sound designer); Jason King (supervising Foley editor); Michael J. Benavente (supervising dialogue/ADR editor); Michael Broomberg, Gary A. Hecker (Foley artists); Ulrika Akander (dialogue/ADR editor)
2007	Tekkonkinkreet	Mitch Osias (sound designer); Tsutomu Asakura (supervising dialogue editor); Michael Dillenberger, Axel Ericson (sound editors); Masahiko Kubo, Matt Naiman (Foley artists)

Best Sound Editing - Sound Effects, Foley, Music, Dialogue and ADR Animation in a Feature Film

Year	Film	Winners/Nominees
2008	WALL-E±	Ben Burtt (supervising sound editor/sound designer/re-recording mixer); Matthew Wood (supervising sound editor); E.J Holowicki (additional sound designer); Al Nelson, Dustin Cawood, Teresa Eckton(sound effects editors); Juan Peralta, Kevin Sellers (Foley editors); Steve Slanec (ADR editor); Bill Bernstein (music editor); Dennie Thorpe, Jana Vance (Foley artists)
2008	Bolt	Randy Thom (supervising sound editor/sound designer/re-recording mixer); Frank E. Eulner (supervising sound editor); J.R. Grubbs, Scott Guitteau (sound effects editors); James Likowski (Foley editor); Marshall Winn (dialogue editor); Earl Ghaffari, Thomas A. Carlson (music editors); Dennie Thorpe, Jana Vance (Foley artists)
2008	Fear(s) of the Dark	Fred Demolder, Valène Leroy (supervising sound editors/sound designers); Emmanuel de Boissieu (sound designer/sound re-recording mixer); Bertrand Boudaud, Philippe van Leer (Foley artists)
2008	Dr. Seuss' Horton Hears a Who!	Randy Thom (supervising sound editor/sound designer/re-recording mixer); Dennis Leonard (supervising sound editor); Sue Fox (supervising Foley editor); Jonathan Null (supervising dialogue/ADR editor); Colette D. Dahanne, Pete Horner, Kyrsten Mate, Mac Smith (sound effects editors); Jeremy Bowker, Andrea Gard (Foley editors); Steve Slanec (dialogue editor); Thomas A. Carlson (music editor); Ronni Brown, Ellen Heuer, Dennie Thorpe, Jana Vance (Foley artists)
2008	Kung Fu Panda	Ethan Van der Ryn, Erik Aadahl (supervising sound editors/sound designers); Mike Hopkins (supervising dialogue/ADR editor); P.K. Hooker, Paul Pirola (sound effects editors); Wayne Lemmer (ADR editor); Jonathan Klein (Foley editor); Adam Smalley (music editor); John T. Cucci, Dan O'Connell (Foley artists)
2008	Madagascar: Escape 2 Africa	Will Files (supervising sound editor/sound designer); Dennis Leonard (supervising sound editor); Randy Thom (sound designer); Sue Fox (supervising Foley editor); Jonathan Null (supervising dialogue/ADR editor); Jeremy Bowker, Dustin Cawood, Pete Horner, Mac Smith (sound effects editors); Larry Oatfield (Foley editor); Slamm Andrews (music editor); Dennie Thorpe, Jana Vance (Foley artists)
2008	The Tale of Despereaux	Lon Bender (supervising sound editor); Jon Title (sound designer); Nancy MacLeod (supervising Foley editor); Chris Jargo (supervising dialogue/ADR editor); Paul Aulicino (sound effects editor); Michael Hertlein (dialogue/ADR editor); Anna MacKenzie, Michelle Pazer (ADR editors); Peter Myles (music editor); Diane Marshall, James Moriana, Jeffrey Wilhoit (Foley artists)
2008	Waltz with Bashir	Aviv Aldema (supervising sound editor/sound designer); Noemi Hampel (sound designer); Adrian Baumeister (supervising dialogue editor); Nili Feller (music editor); Carsten Richter (Foley artist)
2009	Up±	Tom Myers (supervising sound editor/sound designer/re-recording mixer); Michael Silvers (supervising sound editor); E.J. Holowicki (additional sound designer); Teresa Eckton, J.R. Grubbs, Al Nelson (sound effects editors); Pascal Garneau, Jonathan Null (Foley editors); Steve Slanec (ADR editor); Stephen M. Davis (music editor); Dennie Thorpe, Jana Vance (Foley artists)
2009	Cloudy with a Chance of Meatballs	Jason George, Geoffrey G. Rubay (supervising sound editors); John Pospisil (sound designer); John Dunn, Ben Wilkins (sound effects editors); Andrew Dorfman (music editor); Michael Broomberg, Gary A. Hecker (Foley artists)
2009	Coraline	Ronald Eng (supervising sound editor/sound designer/music editor); David A. Cohen (supervising sound/dialogue/ADR editor); Randy Thom (additional sound designer); Willard Overstreet (supervising Foley editor); Steve Boeddeker, Steve Tushar (sound effects editors); Dan O'Connell (Foley artist)
2009	Fantastic Mr. Fox	David Evans, Jacob Ribicoff (supervising sound editors); Harry Barnes (supervising Foley editor); Tony Currie (supervising dialogue editor); Steve Browell, Stefan Henrix, Andy Kennedy (sound effects editors); Stuart Stanley (Foley editor); Gerald Donlan, Tony Martinez (dialogue editors); Gerard McCann (music editor); Peter Burgis, Jay Peck (Foley artists)
2009	Monsters vs. Aliens	Ethan Van der Ryn, Erik Aadahl (supervising sound editors/sound designers); Susan Dudeck (supervising ADR editor); P.K. Hooker, John Marquis (sound effects editors); Wayne Lemmer (ADR editor); Jonathan Klein (Foley editor); Adam Milo Smalley (music editor); John T. Cucci, Dan O'Connell (Foley artists)
2009	9	Will Files (supervising sound editor/sound designer); Pascal Garneau (supervising Foley editor/Foley editor); Jill Purdy (supervising dialogue editor); Jeremy Bowker, Luke Dunn Gielmuda (sound effects editors); Shie Rozow (music editor); Dennie Thorpe, Jana Vance (Foley artists)
2009	The Princess and the Frog	Odin Benitez (supervising sound editor/sound designer); Todd Toon (supervising Foley editor); G.W. Brown (supervising dialogue/ADR editor); Arthur Farkas, Greg Hedgepath, Jeff Sawyer (sound effects editors); Christopher T. Welch, Charles W. Ritter (dialogue/ADR editors); Willard Overstreet (Foley editor); Bruno Coon, Earl Ghaffari (music editors); Alyson Dee Moore, John Roesch (Foley artists)

=== 2010s ===
Best Sound Editing - Sound Effects, Foley, Dialogue and ADR in an Animation Feature Film

Year	Film	Winners/Nominees
2010	How to Train Your Dragon	Randy Thom (supervising sound editor/sound designer); Jonathan Null (supervising sound editor); Al Nelson (additional sound designer); Colette D. Dahanne, Josh Gold (sound effects editors); Pascal Garneau, Sue Fox (Foley editors); Chris Gridley (ADR editor); Dennie Thorpe, Jana Vance (Foley artists)
2010	Despicable Me	Christopher Scarabosio (supervising sound editor/sound designer); Dennis Leonard (supervising sound editor); Luke Dunn Gielmuda (supervising Foley editor); Daniel Laurie (supervising dialogue/ADR editor); Steve Bissinger, Jeremy Bowker, David C. Hughes (sound effects editors); Larry Oatfield (Foley editor); Sean England, Michael Lyle (Foley artists)
2010	Legend of the Guardians: The Owls of Ga'Hoole	Wayne Pashley (supervising sound/ADR editor/sound designer); Fabian Sanjurjo (supervising sound effects editor); John Simpson (supervising Foley editor); Polly McKinnon (supervising dialogue editor); Nick Breslin, Damian Candusso, Rick Lisle, Andrew Miller, Damon Mouris (sound effects editors); Lisa Simpson (Foley editor); Paul Huntingford, Martin Kwok, Derryn Pasquill, Jenny T. Ward (dialogue editors)
2010	Shrek Forever After	Ethan Van der Ryn, Erik Aadahl (supervising sound editors/sound designers); Susan Dudeck (supervising ADR editor); John Marquis, P.K. Hooker (sound effects editors); Ulrika Akander (ADR editor); Jonathan Klein (Foley editor); Dan O'Connell, John Cucci (Foley artists)
2010	Tangled	Cameron Frankley (supervising sound editor/sound designer); David V. Butler (supervising dialogue editor); Petra Bach (supervising ADR editor); Jason W. Jennings, Ai-Ling Lee (sound effects editors); Earl Ghaffari (music editor); Alyson Dee Moore, John Roesch (Foley artists)
2010	Toy Story 3±	Tom Myers (supervising sound editor/sound designer); Michael Silvers (supervising sound editor); Dustin Cawood, Teresa Eckton, Al Nelson, Tim Nielsen (sound effects editors); Pascal Garneau, Dee Selby (Foley editors); Steve Slanec (ADR editor); Dennie Thorpe, Jana Vance (Foley artists)
2011	The Adventures of Tintin	Chris Ward (supervising sound/dialogue/ADR editor); Brent Burge (supervising sound editor); Dave Whitehead (sound designer); Craig Tomlinson (supervising Foley editor); Gary Rydstrom, Hayden Collow, Justin Doyle, Frank Lipson, Matt Stutter (sound effects editors); Jason Canovas, Martin Kwok, Chris Todd (dialogue editors); Morgan Samuel (ADR editor); Justin Webster ("Snowy" effects editor); John Simpson (Foley artist)
2011	Cars 2	Tom Myers (supervising sound editor/sound designer); Michael Silvers (supervising sound editor); Teresa Eckton, David C. Hughes, Al Nelson (sound effects editors); Pascal Garneau (Foley editor); Steve Slanec (ADR editor); Dennie Thorpe, Jana Vance (Foley artists)
2011	Kung Fu Panda 2	Ethan Van der Ryn, Erik Aadahl (supervising sound editors/sound designers); Susan Dudeck (supervising ADR editor); John Marquis, P.K. Hooker (sound effects editors); Jonathan Klein, Willard Overstreet (Foley editors); Allen Hartz (adr editor) John T. Cucci, Dan O'Connell (Foley artists)
2011	Puss in Boots	Richard King (supervising sound editor/sound designer); Christopher Flick (supervising Foley editor); Jessica Gallavan (supervising ADR editor/dialogue editor); Michael W. Mitchell, Jeff Sawyer (sound effects editors); Alyson Dee Moore, John Roesch (Foley artists)
2011	Rango	Peter Miller (supervising sound editor/sound designer); Addison Teague (supervising sound editor); Steve Slanec (supervising Foley editor); Michael Silvers (supervising dialogue editor); J.R. Grubbs, David C. Hughes, Shannon Mills, Adam Kopald (sound effects editors); Mac Smith (dialogue editor); Richard Hymns (additional ADR editor); Dee Selby (Foley editor); Dennie Thorpe, Jana Vance (Foley artists)
2011	Rio	Randy Thom (supervising sound editor/sound designer); Gwendolyn Yates Whittle (supervising sound editor); Teresa Eckton, Malcolm Fife, Josh Gold, Pete Horner (sound effects editors); Cheryl Nardi (dialogue editor); Luke Dunn Gielmuda, Sue Fox (Foley editors); Dennie Thorpe, Jana Vance (Foley artists)
2011	The Smurfs	Robert L. Sephton (supervising sound editor/sound designer); Will Files (additional sound designer); Mark Pappas (supervising Foley editor); Bernard Weiser (supervising dialogue/ADR editor); Randle Akerson, Paul Berolzheimer (sound effects editors); Robert Troy (dialogue editor); Ronni Brown, Sean England, Robin Harlan, Sarah Monat (Foley artists)
2012	Wreck-It Ralph	Gary Rydstrom (supervising sound editor/sound designer); Frank E. Eulner (supervising sound editor); J.R. Grubbs, E.J. Holowicki (sound effects editors); Marshall Winn (dialogue editor); Luke Dunn Gielmuda, Dee Selby (Foley editors); Earl Ghaffari, Daniel Pinder (music editors); Dennie Thorpe, Jana Vance (Foley artists)
2012	Brave	Gwendolyn Yates Whittle (supervising sound editor); Gary Rydstrom (sound designer); E.J. Holowicki (additional sound designer); Teresa Eckton, Josh Gold, Nia Hansen, Kyrsten Mate (sound effects editors); Cheryl Nardi (ADR editor); Sue Fox, Dee Selby (Foley editors); Dennie Thorpe, Jana Vance (Foley artists)
2012	Madagascar 3: Europe's Most Wanted	Dennis Leonard (supervising sound editor); Will Files (sound designer); Luke Dunn Gielmuda (supervising Foley editor); Jeremy Bowker, Dustin Cawood, Mac Smith (sound effects editors); Richard Quinn (dialogue editor); Slamm Andrews (music editor); Ronni Brown, Sean England (Foley artists)
2012	Frankenweenie	Oliver Tarney (supervising sound editor/sound designer); Michael Fentum (sound designer); Bjorn Ole Schroeder (supervising dialogue editor); Dillon Bennett, Steve Browell (sound effects editors); Peter Burgis, Andie Derrick, Jack Stew, Jason Swanscott (Foley artists); Glen Gathard (Foley mixer)
2012	Dr. Seuss' The Lorax	Randy Thom (supervising sound editor/sound designer); Dennis Leonard (supervising sound editor); Luke Dunn Gielmuda (supervising Foley editor), Daniel Laurie (supervising dialogue/ADR editor); Jonathan Borland, Jeremy Bowker, Leff Lefferts (sound effects editors); Sue Fox (Foley editor); Sean England, Dennie Thorpe, Jana Vance (Foley artists)
2012	ParaNorman	Ronald Eng (supervising sound editor); Steve Boeddeker, Tom Myers (supervising sound editors/sound designers); Willard Overstreet (supervising Foley editor); David A. Cohen (supervising dialogue/ADR editor); Al Nelson, Steve Tushar (sound effects editors); John T. Cucci, Dan O'Connell (Foley artists)
2012	The Pirates! Band of Misfits	Adrian Rhodes (supervising sound editor); Nick Adams, Antony Bayman, Will Norie (sound effects editors); Julien Pirrie (Foley editor); Tim Hands (dialogue editor); Thomas S. Drescher (music editor); Sue Harding (Foley artist)
2012	Rise of the Guardians	Richard King (supervising sound editor/sound designer); Christopher Flick (supervising Foley editor); Jessica Gallavan (supervising dialogue editor); Paul Berolzheimer, Roland N. Thai (sound effects editors); Alyson Dee Moore, John Roesch (Foley artists)
2013	Epic	Randy Thom (supervising sound editor/sound designer); Gwendolyn Yates Whittle (supervising sound editor); Luke Dunn Gielmuda (supervising Foley editor); Brad Semenoff (supervising dialogue editor); Andre Fenley, Jeremy Bowker, Kyrsten Mate, Kent Sparling (sound effects editors); Benjamin A. Burtt, James Likowski (Foley editors); Michael Silvers (dialogue editor); Bill Abbott, Lisa Jaime (music editors); Dennie Thorpe, Jana Vance (Foley artists)
2013	Cloudy with a Chance of Meatballs 2	Geoffrey G. Rubay (supervising sound editor); John Pospisil (sound designer); James Morioka (supervising Foley editor); Jason George (supervising dialogue editor); John Dunn, Jussi Tegelman, David Werntz (sound effects editor); Andrew Dorfman (music editor); Robin Harlan, Sarah Monat (Foley artists)
2013	The Croods	Randy Thom (supervising sound editor/sound designer); Jonathan Null (supervising sound editor); Al Nelson (additional sound designer); J.R. Grubbs, Mac Smith (sound effects editors); Sue Fox, Pascal Garneau (Foley editor); Brian Chumney (dialogue editor); Dennie Thorpe, Jana Vance (Foley artists)
2013	Despicable Me 2	Christopher Scarabosio (supervising sound editor/sound designer); Dennis Leonard (supervising sound editor; Larry Oatfield (supervising Foley editor); Bjorn Ole Schroeder (supervising dialogue editor); Jonathan Borland, E.J. Holowicki, Mac Smith (sound effects editors); Erik Foreman, Frank Rinella (Foley editors); Slamm Andrews (music editor); Ronni Brown, Sean England (Foley artists)
2013	Frozen	Odin Benitez (supervising sound editor/sound designer); Todd Toon (supervising Foley editor); Christopher T. Welch (supervising dialogue/ADR editor); Greg Hedgepath, Angelo Palazzo, Stephen P. Robinson, Jeff Sawyer, Martyn Zub (sound effects editors); Charles W. Ritter (Foley editor); Eliza Pollack Zebert (dialogue editor); Earl Ghaffari, Fernand Bos (music editors); Alyson Dee Moore, John Roesch (Foley artists)
2013	Monsters University	Tom Myers (supervising sound editor/sound designer); Michael Silvers (supervising sound editor); Dustin Cawood, Teresa Eckton, E.J. Holowicki (sound effects editors); Pascal Garneau, Luke Dunn Gielmuda (Foley editors); Brian Chumney (dialogue editor); Bruno Coon (music editor); Dennie Thorpe, Jana Vance (Foley artists)
2013	Planes	Todd Toon (supervising sound editor/sound designer); Rob Nokes (supervising sound editor); Thomas Whiting (supervising ADR editor); Odin Benitez, Pernell L. Salinas, Jeff Sawyer, Charles W. Ritter (sound effects editors); Alyson Dee Moore, John Roesch (Foley artists)
2013	Turbo	Richard King (supervising sound editor/sound designer); Jessica Gallavan (supervising dialogue/ADR editor); Christopher Flick (supervising Foley editor); Paul Berozlheimer, Roland Thai (sound effects editors); Lisa J. Levine (dialogue editor); John Roesch, Alyson Dee Moore (Foley artists)
2014	Big Hero 6	Shannon Mills (supervising sound editor/sound designer); Kim Foscato (supervising dialogue editor); Daniel Laurie (supervising ADR editor); Jeremy Bowker, Nia Hansen, David C. Hughes, Addison Teague (sound effects editors); James Likowski, Robert Shoup (Foley editors); Earl Ghaffari, Daniel Pinder (music editors); Alyson Dee Moore, John Roesch (Foley artists)
2014	The Book of Life	Scott Martin Gershin (supervising sound editor/sound designer); Margit Pfeiffer (supervising dialogue/ADR editor); Charles Martin Inouye (supervising music editor); Stephen P. Robinson, Masanobu 'Tomi' Tomita, Tim Walston, Scott Wolf, Peter Zinda (sound effects editors); Julie Feiner, Christopher T. Welch (ADR editors); John T. Cucci, Dan O'Connell (Foley artists)
2014	The Boxtrolls	Ren Klyce, Tom Myers (supervising sound editors/sound designers); Thom Brennan (supervising Foley editor); Ben Burtt, Dustin Cawood, David C. Hughes (sound effects editors); Jeremy Molod (Foley editor); Marilyn McCoppen (dialogue/ADR editor); James Bellamy, Jonathon Stevens (music editors); Alyson Dee Moore, John Roesch, Dennie Thorpe, Jana Vance (Foley artists)
2014	How to Train Your Dragon 2	Randy Thom (supervising sound editor/sound designer); Michael Silvers (supervising sound editor); Al Nelson (additional sound designer); Brian Chumney (supervising dialogue/ADR editor); Jeremy Bowker, Mac Smith (sound effects editors); Sue Fox, Pascal Garneau (Foley editors); Sean England, Robin Harlan (Foley artists)
2014	The Lego Movie	Wayne Pashley (supervising sound editor/sound designer); Fabian Sanjurjo (supervising sound editor); Derryn Pasquill (supervising dialogue editor); Andrew Dorfman (supervising music editor); Damian Candusso, Rick Lisle, Andrew Miller, Emma Mitchell (sound effects editors); Nigel Christensen, Jared Dwyer, Geoffrey G. Rubay, Cameron Frankley, Jon Michaels (additional sound effects editors); Sonal Joshi (dialogue editor); John Simpson (Foley artist); Tim Ryan (music editor)
2014	Penguins of Madagascar	Paul N. J. Ottosson (supervising sound editor/sound designer/re-recording mixer); Mark Pappas (supervising Foley editor); Christian Schaaning, Jamie Hardt, Bruce Tanis, Greg Ten Bosch (sound effects editors); James Simcik, Robert Troy (ADR editors); Jonathan Klein (Foley editor); Sarah Monat, Robin Harlan, John Roesch, Alyson Dee Moore (Foley artists)
2015	Inside Out	Ren Klyce (supervising sound editor/sound designer/sound effects recordist); Shannon Mills (supervising sound editor); Daniel Laurie (supervising dialogue editor); Stephen M. Davis (supervising music editor); Jeremy Bowker, Malcolm Fife, David C. Hughes (sound effects editors); Thom Brennan (Foley editor); Alyson Dee Moore, John Roesch (Foley artists)
2015	Anomalisa	Christopher S. Aud (supervising sound/ADR editor/sound designer); Aaron Glascock (supervising sound editor/sound designer); Ezra Dweck (supervising Foley editor); Marko A. Costanzo (Foley artists)
2015	The Good Dinosaur	Craig Berkey (supervising sound editor/sound designer); Shannon Mills (supervising sound editor); Daniel Laurie (supervising dialogue editor); Josh Gold, J.R. Grubbs, Nia Hansen (sound effects editors); Erich Stratmann (music editor); Ronni Brown, John Roesch (Foley artists)
2015	Home	Tom Myers, Brian Chumney (supervising sound editors); Randy Thom, Al Nelson (sound designers); Benjamin A. Burtt, Josh Gold (sound effects editors); Marilyn McCoppen (dialogue editor); Frank Rinella, Shaun Farley (Foley editors); Thomas A. Carlson (music editor); Ronni Brown, Sean England (Foley artists)
2015	Hotel Transylvania 2	Geoffrey G. Rubay (supervising sound editor); James Morioka (supervising Foley editor); Curt Schulkey (supervising dialogue/ADR editor); Andrew Dorfman (supervising music editor); Ryan Collins, John Dunn (sound effects editors); Jon Wakeham (Foley editor); Tanya Noel Hill, Lodge Worster (music editors); Robin Harlan, Sarah Monat (Foley artists)
2015	Minions	Christopher Scarabosio (supervising sound editor/sound designer/re-recording mixer); Marilyn McCoppen (supervising dialogue/ADR editor); Dennis Leonard (supervising sound editor); Jeremy Bowker, Luke Dunn Gielmuda, Josh Gold (sound effects editors); Brian Chumney, Larry Oatfield (Foley editors); Slamm Andrews (music editor); Ronni Brown, Sean England (Foley artists)
2015	The Peanuts Movie	Randy Thom (supervising sound editor/sound designer/re-recording mixer); Gwendolyn Yates Whittle (supervising sound editor); Pascal Garneau (supervising Foley editor); Fernand Bos (supervising music editor); Jeremy Bowker, Dmitri Makarov, Mac Smith (sound effects editors); Kimberly Patrick (Foley editor); Cheryl Nardi (dialogue/ADR editor); Ted Caplan, Terry Wilson (music editors); Ronni Brown, Sean England (Foley artists)
2016	Moana	Tim Nielsen (supervising sound editor/sound designer); Jacob Riehle (supervising dialogue editor); Thom Brennan (supervising Foley editor); Jonathan Borland, Pascal Garneau, Lee Gilmore (sound effects editors); Matthew Harrison (Foley editor); Earl Ghaffari, Daniel Pinder (music editors); Shelley Roden, John Roesch (Foley artists)
2016	Finding Dory	Tim Nielsen (supervising sound editor/sound designer); Steve Slanec (supervising sound editor); Jonathan Borland, Ken Fischer, Jack Whittaker (sound effects editors); James Spencer (dialogue editor); Christopher Flick, Jacob Riehle (Foley editors); Bill Bernstein (music editor); Shelley Roden, John Roesch (Foley artists)
2016	Ice Age: Collision Course	Randy Thom (supervising sound editor/sound designer/re-recording mixer); Michael Silvers (supervising sound editor); Brad Semenoff (supervising dialogue/ADR editor); Robert Shoup (supervising foley editor); Jeremy Bowker (additional sound designer); Shaun Farley, E.J. Holowicki (sound effects editors); Jeremy Molod (foley editor); Dennie Thorpe, Jana Vance (foley artists)
2016	Kung Fu Panda 3	Ethan Van der Ryn, Erik Aadahl (supervising sound editors/sound designers); Kira Roessler (supervising dialogue/ADR editor); Jonathan Klein (supervising Foley editor); Jason W. Jennings (additional sound designer); P.K. Hooker (sound effects editor); Christopher Flick (Foley editor); Larry Kemp (dialogue editor); Dan O'Connell, John Cucci (Foley artists)
2016	Trolls	Ethan Van der Ryn, Erik Aadahl (supervising sound editors/sound designers); David Bach (supervising dialogue/ADR editor); Jonathan Klein (supervising Foley editor); Jason W. Jennings, John Marquis (sound designers); Anna McKenzie (ADR editor); Dan O'Connell, John Cucci (Foley artists); Fernand Bos (music editor)
2016	The Secret Life of Pets	David Acord (supervising sound editor/sound designer/re-recording mixer); Dennis Leonard (supervising sound editor); Luke Dunn Gielmuda, Mac Smith (sound effects editors); Cheryl Nardi, Kim Foscato (dialogue editors); Richard Gould, James Likowski, Frank Rinella, David Slusser (foley editors); Ronni Brown, Sean England (foley artists)
2016	Sing	Steve Boeddeker (supervising sound editor/sound designer/re-recording mixer); Dennis Leonard (supervising sound editor); Dustin Cawood, Luke Dunn Gielmuda, Mac Smith (sound effects editors); Cheryl Nardi (dialogue editor); Richard Gould, Zach Martin, Larry Oatfield (Foley editors); Dominick Certo, Michael Connell, Andre Zweers (music editors); Shelley Roden, John Roesch, Ronni Brown, Jana Vance (Foley artists)
2016	Zootopia	Addison Teague (supervising sound editor/sound designer); Jacob Riehle (supervising dialogue editor); Daniel Laurie (supervising ADR editor); Christopher Flick (supervising Foley editor); Jeremy Bowker, Lee Gilmore, Jack Whittaker (sound effects editors); Willard Overstreet (Foley editor); Stephen M. Davis, Earl Ghaffari (music editors); Ronni Brown, John Roesch (Foley artists)

Outstanding Achievement in Sound Editing - Sound Effects, Foley, Dialogue and ADR for Animated Feature Film

Year	Film	Winners/Nominees
2017	Coco	Christopher Boyes (supervising sound editor/sound designer/re-recording mixer); J.R. Grubbs (supervising sound editor); Justin Doyle, Teresa Eckton, Jack Whittaker (sound effects editors); Michael Silvers, Marshall Winn (dialogue/ADR editors); James Likowski, Dee Selby (Foley editors); Stephen M. Davis, Warren Brown (music editors); Dennie Thorpe, Jana Vance, Geoff Vaughan (Foley artists)
2017	The Boss Baby	Paul N. J. Ottosson (supervising sound editor/sound designer); Phil Barrie, Christian Schaaning, Greg Ten Bosch (sound effects editors); Joe Schiff, Robert Troy, Christopher T. Welch (dialogue editors); Christopher Flick, Thom Brennan, Mark Pappas (Foley editors); Sarah Monat, Robin Harlan, Anita Cannella, Amy Kane, Paul Stevenson (Foley artists)
2017	Captain Underpants: The First Epic Movie	Michael Babcock (supervising sound editor/sound designer); Curt Schulkey (supervising ADR editor); Jeff Sawyer (supervising Foley editor/sound effects editor); Chris Diebold (sound effects editor); Patrick Cicero (Foley editor); Catherine Harper, Katherine Rose (Foley artists); Thomas Drescher (music editor)
2017	Cars 3	Tom Myers (supervising sound editor/sound designer/re-recording mixer); Brian Chumney (supervising sound editor); Benjamin A. Burtt, E.J. Holowicki (sound effects editors); Michael Silvers (dialogue/ADR editor); Teresa Eckton, Qianbaihui Yang (Foley editors); Joe E. Rand (music editor); Dennie Thorpe, Jana Vance, Geoff Vaughan (Foley artists)
2017	Despicable Me 3	Tim Nielsen (supervising sound editor/sound designer); Dennis Leonard (supervising sound editor); Matthew Hartman (supervising dialogue editor); Christopher Flick (supervising Foley editor); Mac Smith, Andre Zweers (sound effects editors); Richard Gould (Foley editor); Slamm Andrews (music editor); Shelley Roden, John Roesch (Foley artists)
2017	Ferdinand	Randy Thom (supervising sound editor/sound designer/re-recording mixer); Gwendolyn Yates Whittle (supervising sound editor); Dmitri Makarov (supervising dialogue editor); Larry Oatfield (supervising Foley editor); Jeremy Bowker (additional sound designer); Pascal Garneau, E.J. Holowicki (sound effects editors); Jamie Branquinho, Will Ralston (ADR editors); Chris Manning, Christopher Barnett, Qianbaihui Yang (Foley editors); Thomas A. Carlson (music editor); Shelley Roden, John Roesch (Foley artists)
2017	The Lego Ninjago Movie	Wayne Pashley (supervising sound editor/sound designer); Fabian Sanjuro (supervising sound editor); Rick Lisle, Nigel Christensen, Mario Gabrieli, Andrew Miller, F. Hudson Miller, Terry Rodman (sound effects editors); Emma Mitchell, Ines Richter, Jared Dywer, Paul Huntingford, John Joseph Thomas (additional sound effects editors); Sonal Joshi, Derryn Pasquill, Danielle Wiessner (dialogue editors); Dominick Certo, Maarten Hofmeijer (music editors); John Simpson (Foley artist)
2017	Smurfs: The Lost Village	Robert L. Sephton (supervising sound editor/sound designer); Bernard Weiser (supervising dialogue/ADR editor); James Morioka, Thom Brennan (supervising Foley editors); Jussi Tegelman, Charles Maynes (sound designers); Sarah Monat, Robin Harlan (Foley artists)
2018	Spider-Man: Into the Spider-Verse	Geoffrey G. Rubay, Curt Schulkey (supervising sound editors); John Pospisil (sound designer); Alec Rubay (supervising Foley editor); Christopher S. Aud, Benjamin L. Cook, Donald Flick, Ando Johnson, Michael A. Reagan, Andy Sisul, Kip Smedley, David Werntz (sound effects editors); James Morioka, Matthew E. Taylor (dialogue editors); Michael Broomberg, Gary A. Hecker, Rick Owens (Foley artists)
2018	Dr. Seuss' The Grinch	David Acord (supervising sound editor/sound designer); Dennis Leonard (supervising sound editor); Cheryl Nardi (supervising dialogue editor); Christopher Flick (supervising Foley editor); Pascal Garneau, Bonnie Wild (sound effects editors); Jonathan Greber (dialogue editor); James Likowski (Foley editor); Jana Vance, Geoff Vaughan (Foley artists)
2018	Incredibles 2	Ren Klyce (supervising sound editor/sound designer); Coya Elliott (supervising sound editor); Cheryl Nardi (supervising dialogue/ADR editor); Steve Bissinger, Jonathan Borland, Teresa Eckton, Frank E. Eulner, Steve Orlando (sound effects editors); Thom Brennan, Dee Selby (Foley editors); Shelley Roden, John Roesch (Foley artists)
2018	Isle of Dogs	Christopher Scarabosio, Wayne Lemmer (supervising sound editors); Peter Persaud (Foley editor); Steve Baine (Foley artist)
2018	Peter Rabbit	Robert Mackenzie, Andy Wright (supervising sound editors); Mark Franken (supervising dialogue/ADR editor); Ulrika Akander (supervising ADR editor); Mick Boraso, Tara Webb (sound effects editors); Leah Katz, Mia Stewart (dialogue/ADR editors); Steve Burgess, Adam Connelly (Foley editors); Mario Vaccaro (Foley artist)
2018	Ralph Breaks the Internet	Jacob Riehle, Addison Teague (supervising sound editors); Jeremy Bowker, Gary Rydstrom (sound designers); Willard Overstreet (supervising Foley editor); Lee Gilmore, Samson Neslund (sound effects editors); Christopher Flick, Thom Brennan (Foley editors); Earl Ghaffari, Daniel Pinder (music editors); Shelley Roden, John Roesch (Foley artists)
2018	Smallfoot	Michael Babcock (supervising sound editor/sound designer); Harrison Meyle (supervising dialogue editor); Jeff Sawyer (supervising Foley editor/sound effects editor); Chris Diebold (sound effects editor); Dan Kenyon (Foley editor); Catherine Harper, Katherine Rose (Foley artists)
2019	Toy Story 4	Ren Klyce (supervising sound editor/sound designer); Coya Elliott (supervising sound editor); Cheryl Nardi (supervising dialogue/ADR editor); Thom Brennan (supervising Foley editor); Jonathon Stevens, Kimberly Patrick, Qianbaihui Yang (sound effects editors); James Spencer (Foley editor); Shelley Roden, John Roesch (Foley artists)
2019	Abominable	Ethan Van der Ryn, Erik Aadahl (supervising sound editors/sound designers); David Bach (supervising dialogue/ADR editor); Jonathan Klein (supervising Foley editor); Malte Bieler (sound designer); Goeun Lee Everett, Jason W. Jennings, Tim Walston (sound effects editors); Alicia Stevenson, Dawn Lunsford (Foley artists)
2019	The Angry Birds Movie 2	Tom Myers (supervising sound editor/sound designer/re-recording mixer); Brian Chumney (supervising sound editor); David C. Hughes, Steve Orlando (sound effects editors); Shaun Farley, Zach Martin (Foley editors); Ronni Brown, Jana Vance (Foley artists)
2019	Frozen 2	Odin Benitez (supervising sound editor/sound designer); Harrison Meyle (supervising dialogue/ADR editor); Christopher Bonis (supervising Foley editor); Earl Ghaffari (supervising music editor); Eliot Connors, Angelo Palazzo, Stephen P. Robinson, Jeff Sawyer, Russell Topal (sound effects editors); Fernand Bos (music editor); Shelley Roden, John Roesch (Foley artists)
2019	How to Train Your Dragon: The Hidden World	Brian Chumney, Leff Lefferts (supervising sound editors); Randy Thom, Al Nelson (sound designers); Jeremy Bowker (additional sound designer); Jonathan Borland, Malcolm Fife (sound effects editors); Dee Selby (Foley editor); Jana Vance, Geoff Vaughan (Foley artists)
2019	The Lion King	Christopher Boyes (supervising sound editor/sound designer/re-recording mixer); Frank E. Eulner (supervising sound editor); James Likowski (supervising Foley editor); Justin Doyle, Pascal Garneau (sound effects editors); Marshall Winn (dialogue editor); Dee Selby (Foley editor); Ronni Brown, Jana Vance (Foley artists)
2019	The Secret Life of Pets 2	David Acord (supervising sound editor/sound designer/re-recording mixer); Dennis Leonard (supervising sound editor); Jonathan Greber (supervising dialogue/ADR editor); Frank Rinella (supervising Foley editor); Addison Teague, Benjamin A. Burtt, J.R. Grubbs (sound effects editors); Richard Gould, Larry Oatfield (Foley editors); Ronni Brown, Andrea Gard, Margie O'Malley (Foley artists)
2019	Spies in Disguise	Jeremy Bowker, Leff Lefferts (supervising sound editors); Randy Thom (supervising sound editor/sound designer/re-recording mixer); Bjorn Ole Schroeder (supervising dialogue editor); Larry Oatfeld (supervising Foley editor); David Farmer, Samson Neslund (sound effects editors); Michael Silvers (dialogue/ADR editor); Chris Manning (Foley editor); Shelley Roden, John Roesch (Foley artists)
2019	The Lego Movie 2: The Second Part	Ethan Van der Ryn, Erik Aadahl (supervising sound editors/sound designer); Malte Bieler, Jason W. Jennings, Brandon Jones (sound designers); Joel Erickson (supervising dialogue/ADR editor); Jonathan Klein (supervising Foley editor); Tim Walston, Matt Yocum (sound effects editors); John Stuver, Michelle Perrone, Harrison Meyle (dialogue editors); Alyson Dee Moore, Christopher Moriana (Foley artists)

=== 2020s ===
Year	Film	Winners/Nominees
2020
2020	Soul	Coya Elliott (supervising sound editor); Ren Klyce (supervising sound editor/sound designer/re-recording mixer); Cheryl Nardi (supervising dialogue/ADR editor); Thom Brennan (supervising Foley editor); Steve Orlando, Kimberly Patrick, Jonathan Stevens (sound effects editors); Dee Selby (Foley editor); Shelley Roden, John Roesch (Foley artists)
2020	The Croods: A New Age	Brian Chumney, Leff Lefferts (supervising sound editors); Randy Thom (sound designer); Dominick Certo (supervising music editor); Pascal Garneau, Mac Smith (sound effects editors); Doug Winningham, Dee Selby (Foley editors); Jonathan Greber (dialogue editor); Ronni Brown, Shelley Roden, John Roesch, Jana Vance (Foley artists)
2020	Onward	Shannon Mills (supervising sound editor/sound designer); Nia Hansen (sound designer); Chris Gridley (supervising dialogue/ADR editor); Christopher Flick (supervising Foley editor); Josh Gold, David C. Hughes, Samson Neslund, Kimberly Patrick (sound effects editors); Steve Orlando (Foley editor); Erich Stratmann (music editors); Shelley Roden, John Roesch (Foley artists)
2020	Over the Moon	Jeremy Bowker, Qianbaihui Yang (supervising sound editors); Dee Selby (supervising Foley editor); James Spencer, Brad Semenoff (dialogue/ADR editors); Chris Frazier, Alyssa Nevarez, Larry Oatfield (Foley editors); Bradley Farmer (music editor); Ronni Brown, Jana Vance (Foley artists)
2020	Scoob!	Bill R. Dean (supervising sound editor/sound designer); Kira Roessler (supervising dialogue editor); Willard Overstreet (supervising foley editor); Ando Johnson, Harry Cohen (sound designers); Jon Title, Jeff Sawyer, Mitch Osias (sound designers/sound effects editors); Matt Wilson, Jeremy Peirson (sound effects editors); Michelle Pazer, Cameron Steenhagen, Fred Paragano, Julie Feiner (dialogue editors); Christopher Flick (foley editor); Catherine Harper, Katherine Rose (foley artists)
2020	Trolls World Tour	Paul Hackner (supervising sound editor/sound designer); Susan Dudeck (supervising dialogue editor); Jessie Pariseau (supervising Foley editor); Mark Larry (sound effects editor); Catherine Harper, Katherine Rose (Foley artists)
2021	Raya and the Last Dragon	Shannon Mills (supervising sound editor/sound designer); Brad Semenoff (supervising dialogue editor/ADR editor); Nia Hansen (additional sound designer); Earl Ghaffari, Jim Weidman (supervising music editors); David C. Hughes, Samson Neslund (sound effects editors); Chris Frazier, Steve Orlando (Foley editors); Shelley Roden, John Roesch (Foley artists); David Olson, Kendall Demarest, Tommy Holmes (music editors)
2021	Encanto	Shannon Mills (supervising sound editor/sound designer); Brad Semenoff (supervising dialogue editor/ADR editor); Nia Hansen (sound designer); Earl Ghaffari (supervising music editor); Justin Doyle, Samson Neslund, Qianbaihui Yang (sound effects editors); Alyssa Nevarez (Foley editor); Richard Quinn (dialogue editor); Shelley Roden, John Roesch (Foley artists); Kendall Demarest, Angie Rubin (music editors)
2021	Luca	Christopher Scarabosio (supervising sound editor/sound designer/re-recording mixer); Andre Fenley (supervising sound editor); Ronni Brown (supervising Foley editor/Foley artist); Richard Quinn (supervising dialogue editor); Justin Doyle, Pascal Garneau (sound effects editors); Larry Oatfield (Foley editor); Jana Vance (Foley artist); Lodge Worster (music editor)
2021	The Mitchells vs. the Machines	Geoffrey G. Rubay (supervising sound editor); James Morioka (supervising dialogue/ADR editor); John Pospisil (sound designer); Greg Ten Bosch, Dan Kenyon, Alec G. Rubay, Andy Sisul, Kip Smedley (sound effects editors); Curt Schulkey (ADR editor); Kai Scheer (Foley editor); Gregg Barbanell, Rick Owens (Foley artists); Dominick Certo (music editor)
2021	The Boss Baby: Family Business	Paul N. J. Ottosson (supervising sound editor/sound designer); Christian Schaanning, Matt Yocum, Greg Ten Bosch (sound effects editors); James Morioka, Robert Troy (dialogue editors); Jade Hill (Foley editor); Michael Broomberg (Foley artist)
2021	Sing 2	Dennis Leonard (supervising sound editor); Daniel Laurie (supervising ADR editor); Dominick Certo (supervising music editor); Josh Gold (sound designer); Benjamin A. Burtt, Lucas Miller (sound effects editors); Jonathan Greber (dialogue editor); Shaun Farley, Jonathon Stevens (Foley editors); Charles Martin Inouye (music editor)
2022	Guillermo del Toro's Pinocchio	Scott Martin Gershin (supervising sound editor); Masanobu "Tomi" Tomita, Andrew Vernon, Dan Gamache (sound effects editors); Dan Gamache (dialogue editor); Dan O'Connell, John Cucci (Foley artists)
2022	The Bad Guys	Jason W. Jennings (supervising sound editor/sound designer); Julian Slater (supervising sound editor); Paul Pirola (supervising Foley editor); Brandon Jones (sound designer); Michelle Pazer, Joel Erickson (dialogue editors); Brendan Croxon, Adam Shaw (Foley editors); John Simpson (Foley artist)
2022	DC League of Super-Pets	Bill R. Dean, Ando Johnson (supervising sound editors/sound designers); Jessie Pariseau (supervising sound/Foley editor); Erick Ocampo (sound designer); Chris Battaglia, Kip Smedley (sound effects editors); Stephanie Brown (supervising dialogue/ADR editor); Chase Keehn (dialogue editor); Bruce Tanis (Foley editor); Alyson Dee Moore, Christopher Moriana (Foley artists)
2022	Lightyear	Coya Elliott (supervising sound editor); Ren Klyce (supervising sound editor/sound designer); Cheryl Nardi (supervising dialogue/ADR editor); Kimberly Patrick, Jonathon Stevens, Benjamin A. Burtt (sound effects editor); James Spencer, Dee Selby (Foley editors); Shelley Roden, John Roesch (Foley artists)
2022	Minions: The Rise of Gru	Tim Nielsen (supervising sound editor/sound designer); Steve Slanec (supervising sound editor); Christopher Flick (supervising Foley editor); Justin Doyle, Andre Zweers (sound effects editors); Jonathan Greber (dialogue editor); Heiiki Kossi (Foley artist)
2022	Puss in Boots: The Last Wish	Jason W. Jennings (supervising sound editor/sound designer); Julian Slater (supervising sound editor); Paul Pirola (supervising Foley editor); Tim Walston (sound designer); Ken McGill (sound effects editor); Mia Stewart (dialogue editor); Christopher Campanga, Adam Shaw (Foley editors); Sam Rogers (Foley artist)
2022	Turning Red	Ren Klyce (supervising sound editor/sound designer/re-recording mixer); Coya Elliot (supervising sound editor); Cheryl Nardi (supervising dialogue/ADR editor); Kimberly Patrick, Steve Bissinger, Jonathan Stevens (sound effects editors); James Spencer (Foley editor); John Roesch, Shelly Roden (Foley artists)
2023	Spider-Man: Across the Spider-Verse	Geoffrey G. Rubay (supervising sound editor); James Morioka (supervising dialogue/ADR editor); Colin Lechner (supervising Foley editor); John Pospisil, Alec Rubay, Kip Smedley (sound designers); Cathryn Wang, David Werntz, Bruce Tanis, Greg ten Bosch, Daniel McNamara, Will Digby, Andy Sisul (sound effects editors); Rob Getty, Jason W. Freeman, Kai Scheer (dialogue editors); Gregg Barbanell, Alex Ullrich, Jeffrey Wilhoit, Dylan Wilhoit (Foley artists)
2023	Elemental	Ren Klyce (supervising sound editor/sound designer); Coya Elliott (supervising sound editor); Richard Quinn (supervising dialogue/ADR editor); Jonathan Stevens (additional sound designer); Benjamin A. Burtt, Kimberly Patrick, Steve Bissinger (sound effects editors); Dee Selby, Nicholas Docter (Foley editors); Shelley Roden, Heikki Kossi (Foley artists)
2023	Migration	Josh Gold (supervising sound editor/sound designer); Daniel Laurie (supervising sound editor); Richard Gould, Scott Guitteau (sound effects editors); Bjorn Ole Schroder (dialogue editor); Thom Brennan, E. Larry Oatfield (Foley editors); Sean England, Andrea Gard (Foley artists); Bill Bernstein (music editor)
2023	The Super Mario Bros. Movie	Daniel Laurie (supervising sound editor); Jacob Riehle (supervising dialogue/ADR editor); E. Larry Oatfield (supervising Foley editor); Randy Thom, Jamey Scott (sound designers); Leff Lefferts, Qianbaihui Yang, Scott Guitteau (sound effects editors); Zach Martin (Foley editor); Ronni Brown, Jana Vance, Sean England (Foley artists)
2024	The Wild Robot±	Brian Chumney, Leff Lefferts (supervising sound editors); Randy Thom (sound designer), David Farmer, David Hughes, Jamey Scott (sound effects editors); Rich Quinn (dialogue editor); Malcolm Fife, Dee Selby (Foley editors); Ronni Brown, Jana Vance (Foley artists)
2024	Inside Out 2	Coya Elliott (supervising sound editor); Ren Klyce (supervising sound editior/sound designer), David C. Hughes, Jonathon Stevens (sound effects editors); Cheryl Nardi (supervising dialogue editor); Dee Selby (supervising Foley editor); Nicholas Docter (Foley editor); Heikki Kossi, Shelley Roden (Foley artists)
2024	The Lord of the Rings: The War of the Rohirrim	Brent Burge, Martin Kwok, Matt Stutter (supervising sound editors); David Farmer (sound designer); Hayden Collow, Alexis Feodoroff (sound effects editors); Dmitry Novikov (dialogue editor); Michael Donaldson, Craig Tomlinson (Foley editors); Simon Riley (Foley artist)
2024	Mufasa: The Lion King	Onnalee Blank (supervising sound editor); Harry Cohen, Paula Fairfield, Luke Gibleon, Jason W. Jennings (sound designers); Benjamin L. Cook, Katie Halliday, Ando Johnson, Michael Mitchell, Jessie Pariseau, Roland N. Thai (sound effects editors); Vanessa Lapato (supervising ADR editor); Katy Wood (supervising dialogue editor); Pietu Korhonen (Foley editor); John Cucci, Gary Hecker, Mike Horton, Heikki Kossi, Dan O'Connell (Foley artists)
2025	Zootopia 2	Jeremy Bowker (supervising sound editor/sound designer); Brad Semenoff (supervising dialogue editor); Stephen M. Davis, Earl Ghaffari (supervising music editors); Luke Dunn Gielmuda, Joel Raabe, Kimberly Patrick, Cameron Barker (sound effects editors); Jacob Riehle, Angela Ang (dialogue editors); Kendall Demarest (music editor); Jordan Myers (Foley editor); Ronni Brown, Sean England (Foley artists)
2025	The Bad Guys 2	Ken McGill, Julian Slater (supervising sound editors); Paul Pirola (supervising foley editor); Cathryn Wang (sound effects editor)
2025	Elio	Jeremy Bowker (supervising sound editor/sound designer); Cheryl Nardi (supervising dialogue editor); Jordan Myers (supervising Foley editor); Steve Bissinger, Jessey Drake, Richard Gould, Joel Raabe (sound effects editors); Ronni Brown, Jana Vance (Foley artists)
2025	KPop Demon Hunters	Michael Babcock (supervising sound editor); Branden Spencer (supervising dialogue editor); Michael Babcock, Chris Diebold, Jeff Sawyer, Trevor Gates, Katie Halliday (sound designers); Goeun Lee Everett, Russell Topal (sound effects editors); Ian Herzon, Beso Kacharava (Foley editors)

== Sound editors with most wins ==
- Michael Silvers - 8
- Randy Thom - 6
- Gary Rydstrom - 4
