= Golden Reel Award for Outstanding Achievement in Sound Editing - Sound Effects, Foley, Dialogue and ADR for Documentary Feature Film =

The Golden Reel Award for Outstanding Achievement in Sound Editing - Sound Effects, Foley, Dialogue and ADR for Documentary Feature Film is an annual award given by the Motion Picture Sound Editors. It honors sound editors whose work has warranted merit in the field of cinema; in this case, their work in the field of documentary feature (theatrical) film. The award has been given with its current title since 2018.

== Winners and nominees ==
Year	Film	Winners/Nominees
2010	Best Sound Editing - Sound Effects, Foley, Dialogue, ADR and Music in a Feature Documentary	
2010	Rush: Beyond the Lighted Stage	David Rose (supervising sound editor, sound effects/music editor), Andrew Wright (sound effects/music editor), Stephen Barden (dialogue editor)
2010	Babies	Samy Bardet (supervising sound/Foley editor, sound designer), Thierry Lebon (supervising sound editor), Eric Chevallier (supervising dialogue editor), Jérôme Faurel (music editor), Philippe Penot (Foley artist)
2010	Catfish	Coll Anderson (supervising sound editor), Matt Snedecor (sound designer)
2010	Exit Through the Gift Shop	Jack Gillies (supervising sound editor), Jim Carey (sound designer)
2010	Inside Job	Tom Efinger (supervising sound editor), Abigail Savage (sound designer)
2010	Restrepo	Coll Anderson (supervising sound editor), Matt Snedecor (sound designer)
2010	Waiting for "Superman"	Skip Lievsay (supervising sound editor); Phil Barrie, Joel Dougherty (sound effects editors); Byron Wilson (dialogue editor); Erica Weis (music editor)
2011	George Harrison: Living in the Material World	Philip Stockton (supervising sound editor), Allan Zaleski (sound designer), Jennifer L. Dunnington (music editor)
2011	Being Elmo: A Puppeteer's Journey	Ken Hahn (supervising sound editor), Jay Fisher (sound effects/Foley editor), Kevin Bluhm (music editor)
2011	Cave of Forgotten Dreams	Eric Spitzer (sound)
2011	Lemmy	Greg Olliver (supervising sound editor)
2011	Pearl Jam Twenty	Eric R. Fischer, Kevin Klauber, Chris Perkel (sound designers)
2012	Last Call at the Oasis	Peter Brown (supervising sound editor), Paul Aulicino (sound effects editor), Glynna Grimala (dialogue), Kim Roberts (music editor)
2012	Bully	Christopher Barnett (supervising sound/dialogue editor); Al Nelson, Gary Rydstrom (sound designers); Bob Edwards, Pascal Garneau, Pete Horner (sound effects editors); Michael Furjanic (music editor)
2012	Climate Refugees	Sam Londe (supervising sound editor, sound designer); Steven Avila (sound designer); Peter D. Lago, Alexander Pugh, Michael Turner, Stephen Spencer (sound effects editors); Bryon Speller, Brian S.M. Wroth (dialogue editor); Steven Utt (music editor)
2012	Jiro Dreams of Sushi	Darren 'Sunny' Warkentin (supervising sound editor, sound designer), Tim Hoogenakker (supervising dialogue editor), Anthony Vanchure (sound effects editor, Foley artist), Robert Weiss (sound effects editor), Chris Johnston (Foley editor)
2012	Marley	Glenn Freemantle (supervising sound editor); Ben Barker, Danny Freemantle, Nina Hartstone (sound editors)
2012	Searching for Sugar Man	Per Nyström (supervising sound editor), Malik Bendjelloul (sound editor)
2013	Epic	Randy Thom (supervising sound editor/sound designer); Gwendolyn Yates Whittle (supervising sound editor); Jeremy Bowker (sound designer); Luke Dunn Gielmuda (supervising Foley editor); Brad Semenoff (supervising dialogue editor); Andre Fenley, Leff Lefferts, Kyrsten Mate, Kent Sparling (sound effects editors); Ben Burtt, James Likowski (Foley editors); Michael Silvers (dialogue editor); Bill Abbott, Lisa Jaime (music editors); Dennie Thorpe, Jana Vance (Foley artists)
2013	Cloudy with a Chance of Meatballs 2	Geoffrey G. Rubay (supervising sound editor); John Pospisil (sound designer); James Morioka (supervising Foley editor); Jason George (supervising dialogue editor); John Dunn, Jussi Tegelman, David Werntz (sound effects editor); Andrew Dorfman (music editor); Robin Harlan, Sarah Monat (Foley artists)
2013	The Croods	Randy Thom (supervising sound editor/sound designer); Jonathan Null (supervising sound editor); Al Nelson (sound designer); Leff Lefferts (assistant sound designer); J.R. Grubbs, Mac Smith (sound effects editors); Sue Fox, Pascal Garneau (Foley editor); Brian Chumney (dialogue editor); Dennie Thorpe, Jana Vance (Foley artists)
2013	Despicable Me 2	Christopher Scarabosio (supervising sound editor/sound designer); Dennis Leonard (supervising sound editor); Larry Oatfield (supervising Foley editor); Bjorn Ole Schroeder (supervising dialogue editor); Jonathan Borland, E.J. Holowicki, Mac Smith (sound effects editors); Erik Foreman, Frank Rinella (Foley editors); Slamm Andrews (music editor); Ronni Brown, Sean England (Foley artists)
2013	Ernest & Celestine	Fred Demolder (supervising sound editor), Bertrand Boudaud (sound effects editor)
2013	Frozen	Odin Benitez (supervising sound editor/sound designer); Todd Toon (supervising Foley editor); Christopher T. Welch (supervising dialogue/ADR editor); Greg Hedgepath, Angelo Palazzo, Stephen P. Robinson, Jeff Sawyer, Martyn Zub (sound effects editors); Charles W. Ritter (Foley editor); Eliza Pollack Zebert (dialogue editor); Alyson Dee Moore, John Roesch (Foley artists)
2013	Monsters University	Tom Myers (supervising sound editor/sound designer); Michael Silvers (supervising sound editor/supervising dialogue editor); Pascal Garneau (supervising Foley editor); Dustin Cawood, Teresa Eckton, E.J. Holowicki (sound effects editors); Luke Dunn Gielmuda (Foley editor); Brian Chumney (dialogue editor); Bruno Coon (music editor); Dennie Thorpe, Jana Vance (Foley artists)
2013	Planes	Todd Toon (supervising sound editor/sound designer); Rob Nokes (supervising sound editor); Thomas Whiting (supervising ADR editor); Odin Benitez, Pernell L. Salinas, Jeff Sawyer (sound effects editors); Charles W. Ritter (sound editor); Alyson Dee Moore, John Roesch (Foley artists)
2014	Big Hero 6	Shannon Mills (supervising sound editor); Robert Shoup (supervising Foley editor); Kim Foscato (supervising dialogue editor); Daniel Laurie (supervising ADR editor); Daniel Pinder (supervising music editor); Jeremy Bowker, Nia Hansen, David C. Hughes, Addison Teague (sound effects editors); James Likowski (Foley editor); Earl Ghaffari (music editor); Alyson Dee Moore, John Roesch (Foley artists)
2014	The Book of Life	Scott Martin Gershin (supervising sound editor/sound designer); Stephen P. Robinson (sound designer); Margit Pfeiffer (supervising dialogue/ADR editor); Charles Martin Inouye (supervising music editor); Jessie Pariseau (sound effects/dialogue editor); Charlie Campagna, Masanobu 'Tomi' Tomita, Tim Walston, Scott Wolf, Peter Zinda (sound effects editors); Julie Feiner, Christopher T. Welch (dialogue/ADR editors); John T. Cucci, Dan O'Connell (Foley artists)
2014	The Boxtrolls	Ren Klyce, Tom Myers (supervising sound editor/sound designer); Thom Brennan (supervising Foley editor); Ben Burtt Dustin Cawood, David C. Hughes (sound effects editors); Jeremy Molod (Foley editor); Marilyn McCoppen (dialogue/ADR editor); James Bellamy, Jonathon Stevens (music editors); Alyson Dee Moore, John Roesch, Dennie Thorpe, Jana Vance (Foley artists)
2014	How to Train Your Dragon 2	Randy Thom (supervising sound editor/sound designer); Michael Silvers (supervising sound editor); Al Nelson (sound designer); Brian Chumney (supervising dialogue/ADR editor); Jeremy Bowker, Mac Smith (sound effects editors); Sue Fox, Pascal Garneau (Foley editors); Sean England, Robin Harlan (Foley artists)
2014	The Lego Movie	Wayne Pashley (supervising sound editor/sound designer); Fabian Sanjurjo (supervising sound editor); John Simpson (supervising Foley editor); Derryn Pasquill (supervising dialogue editor); Andrew Dorfman (supervising music editor); Damian Candusso, Nigel Christensen, Jared Dwyer, Cameron Frankley, Rick Lisle, Jon Michaels, Andrew Miller, Emma Mitchell, Geoffrey G. Rubay (sound effects editors); Ryan Squires (Foley editor); Sonal Joshi (dialogue/ADR editor); Craig Beckett, Jim Harrison, Tim Ryan (music editors)
2015	Inside Out	Ren Klyce (supervising sound editor/sound designer); Shannon Mills (supervising sound editor); Daniel Laurie (supervising dialogue editor); Stephen M. Davis (supervising music editor); Jeremy Bowker, Malcolm Fife, David C. Hughes (sound effects editors); Thom Brennan (Foley editor); Alyson Dee Moore, John Roesch (Foley artists)
2015	Anomalisa	Christopher S. Aud (supervising sound editor/sound designer/supervising ADR editor), Aaron Glascock (supervising sound editor/sound designer), Ezra Dweck (supervising Foley editor), Marko A. Costanzo (Foley artist)
2015	The Good Dinosaur	Craig Berkey (supervising sound editor/sound designer); Shannon Mills (supervising sound editor); Daniel Laurie (supervising dialogue editor); Josh Gold, J.R. Grubbs, Nia Hansen (sound effects editors); Erich Stratmann (music editor); Ronni Brown, John Roesch (Foley artists)
2015	Hotel Transylvania 2	Geoffrey G. Rubay (supervising sound editor); James Morioka (supervising Foley editor); Curt Schulkey (supervising dialogue/ADR editor); Andrew Dorfman (supervising music editor); Ryan Collins, John Dunn, Alec Rubay, Jon Wakeham (sound effects editors); Bernard Weiser (dialogue/ADR editor); Tanya Noel Hill, Lodge Worster (music editors); Robin Harlan, Sarah Monat (Foley artists)
2015	Minions	Dennis Leonard, Christopher Scarabosio (supervising sound editors); Jeremy Bowker, Luke Dunn Gielmuda, Josh Gold (sound effects editors); Brian Chumney, Larry Oatfield (Foley editors); Marilyn McCoppen (ADR editor); Slamm Andrews (music editor); Ronni Brown, Sean England (Foley artists)
2015	The Peanuts Movie	Randy Thom (supervising sound editor/sound designer); Gwendolyn Yates Whittle (supervising sound editor); Pascal Garneau (supervising Foley editor); Fernand Bos (supervising music editor); Jeremy Bowker, Dmitri Makarov, Mac Smith (sound effects editors); Kimberly Patrick (Foley editor); Cheryl Nardi (dialogue/ADR editor); Ted Caplan, Terry Wilson (music editors); Ronni Brown, Sean England (Foley artists)
2015	Shaun the Sheep Movie	Antony Bayman (supervising sound editor); Adrian Rhodes (sound designer); Mathias Schuster (Foley editor); John Warhurst, Kirsty Whalley (music editors); Julien Pirrie (Foley artist)
2016	Moana	Tim Nielsen (supervising sound editor); Jacob Riehle (supervising dialogue editor); Jonathan Borland, Pascal Garneau, Lee Gilmore (sound effects editors); Thom Brennan, Matthew Harrison (Foley editors); Earl Ghaffari, Daniel Pinder (music editors); Dominick Certo, Tommy Holmes (temp music editors); Shelley Roden, John Roesch (Foley artists)
2016	Finding Dory	Steve Slanec (supervising sound editor); Tim Nielsen (sound designer); Jonathan Borland, Ken Fischer, Jack Whittaker (sound effects editor); Christopher Flick, Jacob Riehle (Foley editors); James Spencer (dialogue editor); Bill Bernstein, Michael Zainer (music editors); Shelley Roden, John Roesch (Foley artists)
2016	Kubo and the Two Strings	Tim Chau (supervising sound editor/sound designer); Clayton Weber, Thomas O'Neil Younkman (sound effects editors); Travis Crotts (Foley editor); Dominick Certo (music editor); Gregg Barbanell, Catherine Harper (Foley artists)
2016	The Little Prince	Christopher Barnett, Tim Nielsen (supervising sound editors); Jonathan Borland, Ken Fischer (sound effects editors); Doug Winningham (Foley editor); Brad Semenoff (dialogue editor); Bob Badami, Catherine Wilson (music editors); Heikki Kossi (Foley artist)
2016	The Red Turtle	Sébastien Marquilly, Bruno Seznec (supervising sound editors); Matthieu Michaux (sound designer); Christine Seznec (supervising dialogue editor); Fabien Devillers (music editor); Florian Fabre (Foley artist)
2016	Sing	Dennis Leonard (supervising sound editor); Steve Boeddeker (sound designer); Dustin Cawood, Luke Dunn Gielmuda, Mac Smith (sound effects editors); Ronni Brown, Richard Gould, Zach Martin, Larry Oatfield (Foley editors); Cheryl Nardi (dialogue editor); Dominick Certo, Michael Connell, Andre Zweers (music editors); Shelley Roden, John Roesch, Jana Vance (Foley artists)
2016	Zootopia	Addison Teague (supervising sound editor); Jacob Riehle (supervising dialogue editor); Jeremy Bowker, Lee Gilmore, Jack Whittaker (sound effects editors); Christopher Flick, Willard Overstreet (Foley editors); Daniel Laurie (ADR editor); Stephen M. Davis, Earl Ghaffari, Daniel Waldman (music editors); Dominick Certo, Tommy Holmes (temp music editors); Ronni Brown, John Roesch (Foley artists)

Outstanding Achievement in Sound Editing - Sound Effects, Foley, Dialogue and ADR for Animated Feature Film

Year	Film	Winners/Nominees
2017	Coco	Christopher Boyes, J.R. Grubbs (supervising sound editors); Stephen M. Davis (supervising music editor); Michael Silvers (sound effects/dialogue editor); Justin Doyle, Teresa Eckton, Jack Whittaker (sound effects editors); James Likowski, Dee Selby (Foley editors); Marshall Winn (dialogue editor); Warren Brown, Barney Jones (music editors); Dennie Thorpe, Jana Vance, Geoff Vaughan (Foley artists)
2017	The Breadwinner	Nelson Ferreira, J.R. Fountain (supervising sound editors); Dashen Naidoo, Tyler Whitham (sound effects editors); Kevin Schultz (Foley editor); Erich Stratmann (music editor); John Elliot (Foley artist)
2017	Cars 3	Brian Chumney (supervising sound editor); Tom Myers (sound designer); Benjamin A. Burtt, E.J. Holowicki (sound effects editors); Anthony De Francesco (sound editor); Teresa Eckton, Qianbaihui Yang (Foley editors); Michael Silvers (ADR editor); Joe E. Rand (music editor); Dennie Thorpe, Jana Vance, Geoff Vaughan (Foley artists)
2017	Despicable Me 3	Dennis Leonard (supervising sound editor); Tim Nielsen (sound designer); Mac Smith, Andre Zweers (sound effects editors); Christopher Flick, Richard Gould (Foley editors); Matthew Hartman (dialogue editor); Slamm Andrews (music editor); Shelley Roden, John Roesch (Foley artists)
2017	Ferdinand	Randy Thom, Gwendolyn Yates Whittle (supervising sound editors); Jeremy Bowker (sound designer); Dmitri Makarov (supervising dialogue editor); Christopher Barnett, Pascal Garneau, E.J. Holowicki, Devon Kelley, Leff Lefferts (sound effects editors); Chris Manning, Larry Oatfield, Qianbaihui Yang (Foley editors); Jamie Branquinho, Will Ralston (ADR editors); Thomas A. Carlson (music editor); Scott Curtis, Shelley Roden, John Roesch (Foley artists)
2017	The Lego Batman Movie	Wayne Pashley (supervising sound editor); Rick Lisle (supervising dialogue editor); Christopher S. Aud, Beth Bezzina, Nigel Christensen, Jared Dwyer, Mario Gabrieli, Andrew Miller, F. Hudson Miller, Emma Mitchell, Terry Rodman, Fabian Sanjurjo (sound effects editors); Sonal Joshi, Derryn Pasquill, Linda Yeaney (dialogue editors); Will Kaplan (music editor); John Simpson (Foley artist)
2018	Spider-Man: Into the Spider-Verse	Geoffrey G. Rubay, Curt Schulkey (supervising sound editors); John Pospisil (sound designer); Christopher S. Aud, Benjamin L. Cook, Donald Flick, Ando Johnson, Michael A. Reagan, Andy Sisul, Kip Smedley, David Werntz (sound effects editors); Alec Rubay (Foley editor); James Morioka, Matthew E. Taylor (dialogue editors); Michael Broomberg, Gary A. Hecker, Rick Owens (Foley artists)
2018	The Grinch	David Acord, Dennis Leonard (supervising sound editors); Cheryl Nardi (supervising dialogue editor); Pascal Garneau, Bonnie Wild (sound effects editors); James Likowski (Foley editor); Jonathan Greber (dialogue editor); Jana Vance, Geoff Vaughan (Foley artists)
2018	Incredibles 2	Coya Elliott, Ren Klyce (supervising sound editors); Cheryl Nardi (supervising ADR editor); Steve Bissinger, Jonathan Borland, Teresa Eckton, Frank E. Eulner, Steve Orlando, Jonathon Stevens (sound effects editors); Thom Brennan, Dee Selby (Foley editors); Shelley Roden, John Roesch (Foley artists)
2018	Isle of Dogs	Wayne Lemmer, Christopher Scarabosio (supervising sound editors); Peter Persaud (Foley editor); Steve Baine (Foley artist)
2018	Peter Rabbit	Robert Mackenzie, Andy Wright (supervising sound editors); Mark Franken (supervising dialogue/ADR editor); Ulrika Akander (supervising ADR editor); Mick Boraso, Tara Webb (sound effects editors); Leah Katz, Mia Stewart (dialogue/ADR editors); Steve Burgess, Adam Connelly (Foley editors); Mario Vaccaro (Foley artist)
2018	Ralph Breaks the Internet	Jacob Riehle, Addison Teague (supervising sound editors); Jeremy Bowker, Gary Rydstrom (sound designers); Lee Gilmore, Samson Neslund (sound effects editors); Christopher Flick, Willard Overstreet (Foley editors); Shelley Roden, John Roesch (Foley artists)
2018	Smallfoot	Michael Babcock (supervising sound editor/sound designer); Harrison Meyle (supervising ADR editor); Jeff Sawyer (sound effects/Foley editor); Chris Diebold (sound effects editor); Dan Kenyon (Foley editor); Catherine Harper, Katherine Rose (Foley artists)
2019	Toy Story 4	Coya Elliott (supervising sound editor); Ren Klyce (sound designer); Cheryl Nardi (supervising dialogue editor); Jonathon Stevens, Kimberly Patrick, Qianbaihui Yang (sound effects editors); Thom Brennan, James Spencer (Foley editors); Shelley Roden, John Roesch (Foley artists)
2019	Abominable	Erik Aadahl, Ethan Van der Ryn (supervising sound editors); Malte Bieler, Rick Hromadka (sound designers); Goeun Lee Everett, Jason W. Jennings, Tim Walston (sound effects editors)
2019	Frozen II	Odin Benitez (supervising sound editor); Eliot Connors, Angelo Palazzo, Stephen P. Robinson, Jeff Sawyer (sound designers); Harrison Meyle (supervising dialogue editor); Christopher Bonis (supervising Foley editor); Earl Ghaffari (supervising music editor); Russell Topal (sound effects editor); Fernand Bos, Kendall Demarest (music editors); Scott Curtis (Foley editor); Shelley Roden, John Roesch (Foley artists)
2019	How to Train Your Dragon: The Hidden World	Randy Thom (supervising sound designer); Brian Chumney, Leff Lefferts (supervising sound editors); Al Nelson (sound designer); Jonathan Borland, Malcolm Fife (sound effects editors); Dee Selby (Foley editor); Jana Vance, Geoff Vaughan (Foley artists)
2019	The Lion King	Christopher Boyes (supervising sound editor/sound designer); Frank E. Eulner (supervising sound editor); Justin Doyle, Pascal Garneau (sound effects editors); Marshall Winn (dialogue editor); Dee Selby (Foley editor); Ronni Brown, Jana Vance (Foley artists)
2019	Missing Link	Tim Chau (supervising sound editor/sound designer); Clayton Weber (sound designer); Jessie Pariseau, Terry Rodman, Thomas O'Neil Younkman (sound effects editors); Fred Paragano (dialogue editor); Travis Crotts (Foley editor); Catherine Harper, Amy Kane, Katherine Rose (Foley artists)
2019	Spies in Disguise	Jeremy Bowker, Leff Lefferts (supervising sound editors); Randy Thom (sound designer); Bjorn Ole Schroeder (supervising ADR editor); David Farmer, Samson Neslund (sound effects editors); Michael Silvers (dialogue editor); Chris Manning, Larry Oatfield (Foley editors); Shelley Roden, John Roesch (Foley artists)
2019	White Snake	Guang Chen, Shuangshuang Wang (sound effects editors); Emily Ding (sound effects/dialogue editor); Mei He (sound effects/Foley editor); Sam Fan, Shenglun Lu, Irene Sun (sound effects editor); Sandra Sun (ADR/Foley editor); Yin Miao, Ziwei Wang (Foley artists)
