= List of animated feature films nominated for Academy Awards =

This page highlights the animated feature films nominated for or won Academy Awards aside from the Best Animated Feature category.

== Feature film categories ==
=== Best Picture ===
Animated feature films were nominated for Best Picture in only three cases: 1991, 2009 and 2010. Beauty and the Beast is the only animated-feature film Best Picture nominee before the inception of Best Animated Feature and in the five-nominee format. Up and Toy Story 3 were both nominated after the inception of the animated feature category and in the expanded ten-nominee format.

Year	Film	Award Recipient(s)	Studio	Result	Ref.
1991 (64th)	Beauty and the Beast	Don Hahn	Disney	Nominated	
2009 (82nd)	Up	Jonas Rivera	Disney, Pixar	Nominated	
2010 (83rd)	Toy Story 3	Darla K. Anderson	Disney, Pixar	Nominated	

=== Best International Feature Film ===
Year	Film	Award Recipient(s)	Studio	Result	Ref.
2008 (81st)	Waltz with Bashir	Ari Folman (Israel)	Bridgit Folman Film Gang, Les Films d'Ici, Razor Film Produktion	Nominated	
2021 (94th)	Flee	Jonas Poher Rasmussen (Denmark)	Neon	Nominated	
2024 (97th)	Flow	Gints Zilbalodis (Latvia)	Baltic Content Media	Nominated	

=== Best Documentary Feature ===
Year	Film	Award Recipient(s)	Studio	Result	Ref.
2021 (94th)	Flee	Jonas Poher Rasmussen, Monica Hellström, Signe Byrge Sørensen, and Charlotte De La Gournerie	Neon	Nominated	

== Writing (screenplay) categories ==
=== Best Original Screenplay ===
All films are distributed/produced by Disney/Pixar.

Year	Film	Award Recipient(s)	Result	Ref.
1995 (68th)	Toy Story	Andrew Stanton (screenplay and story), Joss Whedon, Joel Cohen, Alec Sokolow (screenplay), John Lasseter, Pete Docter, Joe Ranft (story)	Nominated	
2003 (76th)	Finding Nemo	Andrew Stanton (screenplay and story), Bob Peterson, David Reynolds (screenplay)	Nominated	
2004 (77th)	The Incredibles	Brad Bird	Nominated	
2007 (80th)	Ratatouille	Brad Bird (screenplay and story), Jan Pinkava, Jim Capobianco (story)	Nominated	
2008 (81st)	WALL-E	Andrew Stanton (screenplay and story), Jim Reardon (screenplay), Pete Docter (story)	Nominated	
2009 (82nd)	Up	Bob Peterson, Pete Docter (screenplay and story), Tom McCarthy (story)	Nominated	
2015 (88th)	Inside Out	Pete Docter (screenplay and story), Meg LeFauve, Josh Cooley (screenplay), Ronnie del Carmen (story)	Nominated	

=== Best Adapted Screenplay ===
Year	Film	Award Recipient(s)	Studio	Result	Ref.
2001 (74th)	Shrek	Ted Elliott, Terry Rossio, Joe Stillman, Roger S. H. Schulman	DreamWorks Animation, Pacific Data Images	Nominated	
2010 (83rd)	Toy Story 3	Michael Arndt (screenplay), John Lasseter, Andrew Stanton, Lee Unkrich (story)	Disney, Pixar	Nominated	

== Music categories ==
=== Best Original Score ===
Year	Film	Award Recipient(s)	Studio	Result	Ref.
1937 (10th)	Snow White and the Seven Dwarfs	Walt Disney Studio Music Department, Leigh Harline, head of department (Score by Frank Churchill, Harline and Paul Smith)	Disney	Nominated	
1939 (12th)	Gulliver's Travels	Victor Young	Fleischer Studios	Nominated	
1940 (13th)	Pinocchio	Leigh Harline and Paul J. Smith (composers); Ned Washington (lyricist)	Disney	Won	
1941 (14th)	Dumbo	Frank Churchill, Oliver Wallace	Disney	Won	
1942 (15th)	Bambi	Frank Churchill, Edward H. Plumb	Disney	Nominated	
1950 (23rd)	Cinderella	Oliver Wallace, Paul Smith	Disney	Nominated	
1951 (24th)	Alice in Wonderland	Oliver Wallace	Disney	Nominated	
1959 (32nd)	Sleeping Beauty	George Bruns	Disney	Nominated	
1963 (36th)	The Sword in the Stone	George Bruns	Disney	Nominated	
1970 (43rd)	A Boy Named Charlie Brown	music by Rod McKuen, John Scott Trotter; lyrics by Rod McKuen, Bill Melendez; Al Shean; adaptation score by Vince Guaraldi	Cinema Center Films, Lee Mendelson Films, Melendez Features, United Feature Syndicate	Nominated	
1989 (62nd)	The Little Mermaid	Alan Menken	Disney	Won	
1991 (64th)	Beauty and the Beast	Alan Menken	Disney	Won	
1992 (65th)	Aladdin	Alan Menken	Disney	Won	
1994 (67th)	The Lion King	Hans Zimmer	Disney	Won	
1995 (68th)	Pocahontas	Music by Alan Menken; Lyrics by Stephen Schwartz; Orchestral Score by Menken	Disney	Won	
1995 (68th)	Toy Story	Randy Newman	Disney, Pixar	Nominated	
1996 (69th)	The Hunchback of Notre Dame	Music by Alan Menken; Lyrics by Stephen Schwartz; Orchestra Score by Menken	Disney	Nominated	
1997 (70th)	Anastasia	Music by Stephen Flaherty; Lyrics by Lynn Ahrens; Orchestral Score by David Newman	20th Century Fox Animation, Fox Animation Studios	Nominated	
1998 (71st)	A Bug's Life	Randy Newman	Disney, Pixar	Nominated	
1998 (71st)	Mulan	Music by Matthew Wilder; Lyrics by David Zippel; Orchestral Score by Jerry Goldsmith	Disney	Nominated	
1998 (71st)	The Prince of Egypt	Music and Lyrics by Stephen Schwartz; Orchestral Score by Hans Zimmer	DreamWorks Animation	Nominated	
2001 (74th)	Monsters, Inc.	Randy Newman	Disney, Pixar	Nominated	
2003 (76th)	Finding Nemo	Thomas Newman	Disney, Pixar	Nominated	
2007 (80th)	Ratatouille	Michael Giacchino	Disney, Pixar	Nominated	
2008 (81st)	WALL-E	Thomas Newman	Disney, Pixar	Nominated	
2009 (82nd)	Up	Michael Giacchino	Disney, Pixar	Won	
2009 (82nd)	Fantastic Mr. Fox	Alexandre Desplat	20th Century Fox Animation, Indian Paintbrush, Regency Enterprises, American Empirical Pictures, Scott Rudin Productions, Dune Entertainment	Nominated	
2010 (83rd)	How to Train Your Dragon	John Powell	DreamWorks Animation	Nominated	
2011 (84th)	The Adventures of Tintin	John Williams	Nickelodeon Movies, Nickelodeon Animation Studio, Amblin Entertainment, The Kennedy/Marshall Company, Hergé Foundation, WingNut Films, Média-Participations, Hemisphere Media Capital	Nominated	
2018 (91st)	Isle of Dogs	Alexandre Desplat	20th Century Fox Animation, Indian Paintbrush, American Empirical Pictures, Scott Rudin Productions, Studio Babelsberg	Nominated	
2020 (93rd)	Soul	Trent Reznor, Atticus Ross, Jon Batiste	Disney, Pixar	Won	
2021 (94th)	Encanto	Germaine Franco	Disney	Nominated	
2024 (97th)	The Wild Robot	Kris Bowers	DreamWorks Animation	Nominated	

=== Best Original Song ===
Since the category's inception in 1934, thirteen animated films have won this music category, with Disney winning eleven (three with Pixar), and DreamWorks winning one. Beauty and the Beast (1991) and The Lion King (1994) both had three nominations in this category, the first and second films to do so.

Gulliver's Travels was the first animated film to be nominated in this category with "Faithful/Forever", but eventually lost to "Over the Rainbow" from The Wizard of Oz.

Wet Blanket Policy, a 1948 Woody Woodpecker short cartoon, was also nominated for Best Original Song. "The Woody Woodpecker" song was written by George Tibbles and Ramey Idriess and was nominated for the 21st Academy Awards. It is the only animated short subject to be nominated in a traditionally feature film category.

Outside of Disney and Pixar theatrical films, The Prince of Egypt (1998), the only film for DreamWorks Animation to win an award category, was also the only non-Disney animated feature to do so until KPop Demon Hunters (2025), the first Sony Pictures Animation feature to be nominated in this category, won with "Golden".

Year	Film	Song/Award Recipient(s)	Studio	Result	Ref.
1939 (12th)	Gulliver's Travels	"Faithful/Forever"; Ralph Rainger (Music), Leo Robin (Lyrics)	Fleischer Studios	Nominated	
1940 (13th)	Pinocchio	"When You Wish Upon a Star"; Leigh Harline (Music), Ned Washington (Lyrics)	Disney	Won	
1941 (14th)	Dumbo	"Baby Mine"; Frank Churchill (Music), Ned Washington (Lyrics)	Disney	Nominated	
1942 (15th)	Bambi	"Love Is a Song"; Frank Churchill (Music), Larry Morey (Lyrics)	Disney	Nominated	
1950 (23rd)	Cinderella	"Bibbidi-Bobbidi-Boo"; Mack David, Al Hoffman and Jerry Livingston	Disney	Nominated	
1967 (40th)	The Jungle Book	"The Bare Necessities"; Terry Gilkyson	Disney	Nominated	
1973 (46th)	Robin Hood	"Love"; George Bruns (Music), Floyd Huddleston (Lyrics)	Disney	Nominated	
1977 (50th)	The Rescuers	"Someone's Waiting for You"; Sammy Fain (Music), Carol Connors and Ayn Robbins (Lyrics)	Disney	Nominated	
1986 (59th)	An American Tail	"Somewhere Out There"; James Horner and Barry Mann (Music), Cynthia Weil (Lyrics)	Sullivan Bluth Studios, Amblin Entertainment	Nominated	
1989 (62nd)	The Little Mermaid	"Under the Sea"; Alan Menken (Music), Howard Ashman (Lyrics)	Disney	Won	
1989 (62nd)	The Little Mermaid	"Kiss the Girl"; Alan Menken (Music), Howard Ashman (Lyrics)	Disney	Nominated	
1991 (64th)	Beauty and the Beast	"Beauty and the Beast"; Alan Menken (Music), Howard Ashman (Lyrics)	Disney	Won	
1991 (64th)	Beauty and the Beast	"Be Our Guest"; Alan Menken (Music), Howard Ashman (Lyrics)	Disney	Nominated	
1991 (64th)	Beauty and the Beast	"Belle"; Alan Menken (Music), Howard Ashman (Lyrics)	Disney	Nominated	
1992 (65th)	Aladdin	"A Whole New World"; Alan Menken (Music), Tim Rice (Lyrics)	Disney	Won	
1992 (65th)	Aladdin	"Friend Like Me"; Alan Menken (Music), Howard Ashman (Lyrics)	Disney	Nominated	
1994 (67th)	The Lion King	"Can You Feel the Love Tonight"; Elton John (Music), Tim Rice (Lyrics)	Disney	Won	
1994 (67th)	The Lion King	"Circle of Life"; Elton John (Music), Tim Rice (Lyrics)	Disney	Nominated	
1994 (67th)	The Lion King	"Hakuna Matata"; Elton John (Music), Tim Rice (Lyrics)	Disney	Nominated	
1995 (68th)	Pocahontas	"Colors of the Wind"; Alan Menken (Music), Stephen Schwartz (Lyrics)	Disney	Won	
1995 (68th)	Toy Story	"You've Got a Friend in Me"; Randy Newman	Disney, Pixar	Nominated	
1997 (70th)	Hercules	"Go the Distance"; Alan Menken (Music), David Zippel (Lyrics)	Disney	Nominated	
1997 (70th)	Anastasia	"Journey to the Past"; Stephen Flaherty (Music), Lynn Ahrens (Lyrics)	20th Century Fox Animation, Fox Animation Studios	Nominated	
1998 (71st)	The Prince of Egypt	"When You Believe"; Stephen Schwartz (Music and Lyrics)	DreamWorks Animation	Won	
1998 (71st)	Quest for Camelot	"The Prayer"; David Foster and Carole Bayer Sager (Music), David Foster, Carole Bayer Sager, Tony Renis and Alberto Testa (Lyrics)	Warner Bros. Feature Animation	Nominated	
1999 (72nd)	Tarzan	"You'll Be in My Heart"; Phil Collins (Music and Lyrics)	Disney	Won	
1999 (72nd)	South Park: Bigger, Longer & Uncut	"Blame Canada"; Trey Parker and Marc Shaiman (Music and Lyrics)	Comedy Central Films, Scott Rudin Productions, Braniff Productions	Nominated	
1999 (72nd)	Toy Story 2	"When She Loved Me"; Randy Newman (Music and Lyrics)	Disney, Pixar	Nominated	
2000 (73rd)	The Emperor's New Groove	"My Funny Friend and Me"; David Hartley and Sting (Music), Sting (Lyrics)	Disney	Nominated	
2001 (74th)	Monsters, Inc.	"If I Didn't Have You"; Randy Newman (Music and Lyrics)	Disney, Pixar	Won	
2002 (75th)	The Wild Thornberrys Movie	"Father and Daughter"; Paul Simon (Music and Lyrics)	Nickelodeon Movies, Nickelodeon Animation Studio, Klasky Csupo	Nominated	
2003 (76th)	The Triplets of Belleville	"Belleville Rendez-Vous"; Benoît Charest (Music), Sylvain Chomet (Lyrics)	Les Armateurs, Production Champion, Vivi Film, France 3 Cinéma	Nominated	
2004 (77th)	Shrek 2	"Accidentally in Love"; Jim Bogios, David Bryson, Adam Duritz, Charlie Gillingham, David Immerglück and Matthew Malley (Music), Adam Duritz and Daniel Vickrey (Lyrics)	DreamWorks Animation	Nominated	
2004 (77th)	The Polar Express	"Believe"; Glen Ballard and Alan Silvestri (Music and Lyrics)	Castle Rock Entertainment, Shangri-La Entertainment, ImageMovers	Nominated	
2006 (79th)	Cars	"Our Town"; Randy Newman (Music and Lyrics)	Disney, Pixar	Nominated	
2008 (81st)	WALL-E	"Down to Earth"; Peter Gabriel and Thomas Newman (Music), Peter Gabriel (Lyrics)	Disney, Pixar	Nominated	
2009 (82nd)	The Princess and the Frog	"Almost There"; Randy Newman (Music and Lyrics)	Disney	Nominated	
2009 (82nd)	The Princess and the Frog	"Down in New Orleans"; Randy Newman (Music and Lyrics)	Disney	Nominated	
2010 (83rd)	Toy Story 3	"We Belong Together"; Randy Newman (Music and Lyrics)	Disney, Pixar	Won	
2010 (83rd)	Tangled	"I See the Light"; Alan Menken (Music), Glenn Slater (Lyrics)	Disney	Nominated	
2011 (84th)	Rio	"Real in Rio"; Carlinhos Brown and Sérgio Mendes (Music), Siedah Garrett (Lyrics)	Blue Sky Studios, 20th Century Fox Animation	Nominated	
2013 (86th)	Frozen	"Let It Go"; Kristen Anderson-Lopez and Robert Lopez (Music and Lyrics)	Disney	Won	
2013 (86th)	Despicable Me 2	"Happy"; Pharrell Williams (Music and Lyrics)	Illumination Entertainment	Nominated	
2014 (87th)	The Lego Movie	"Everything Is Awesome"; Shawn Patterson (Music and Lyrics)	Village Roadshow Pictures, Lego System A/S, Vertigo Entertainment, Warner Animation Group	Nominated	
2016 (89th)	Trolls	"Can't Stop the Feeling!"; Justin Timberlake, Max Martin and Karl Johan Schuster (Music and Lyrics)	DreamWorks Animation	Nominated	
2016 (89th)	Moana	"How Far I'll Go"; Lin-Manuel Miranda (Music and Lyrics)	Disney	Nominated	
2017 (90th)	Coco	"Remember Me"; Robert Lopez and Kristen Anderson Lopez (Music and Lyrics)	Disney, Pixar	Won	
2019 (92nd)	Toy Story 4	"I Can't Let You Throw Yourself Away"; Randy Newman (Music and Lyrics)	Disney, Pixar	Nominated	
2019 (92nd)	Frozen II	"Into the Unknown"; Robert Lopez and Kristen Anderson-Lopez (Music and Lyrics)	Disney	Nominated	
2021 (94th)	Encanto	"Dos Oruguitas"; Lin-Manuel Miranda (Music and Lyrics)	Disney	Nominated	
2025 (98th)	KPop Demon Hunters	"Golden"; Ejae, Mark Sonnenblick, 24, Ido, Teddy Park, Ian Eisendrath (Music and Lyrics)	Sony Pictures Animation, Netflix	Won	

== Sound categories ==
=== Best Sound ===
Year	Film	Award Recipient(s)	Studio	Result	Ref.
1942 (15th)	Bambi	Sam Slyfield	Disney	Nominated	
1950 (23rd)	Cinderella	C. O. Slyfield	Disney	Nominated	
1991 (64th)	Beauty and the Beast	Terry Porter, Mel Metcalfe, David J. Hudson and Doc Kane	Disney	Nominated	
1992 (65th)	Aladdin	Terry Porter, Mel Metcalfe, David J. Hudson and Doc Kane	Disney	Nominated	
2020 (93rd)	Soul	Ren Klyce, Coya Elliot and David Parker	Disney, Pixar	Nominated	
2024 (97th)	The Wild Robot	Randy Thom, Brian Chumney, Gary A. Rizzo and Leff Lefferts	DreamWorks Animation	Nominated	

=== Best Sound Editing ===
Year	Film	Award Recipient(s)	Studio	Result	Ref.
1992 (65th)	Aladdin	Mark Mangini	Disney	Nominated	
2001 (74th)	Monsters, Inc.	Gary Rydstrom and Michael Silvers	Disney, Pixar	Nominated	
2003 (76th)	Finding Nemo	Gary Rydstrom and Michael Silvers	Disney, Pixar	Nominated	
2004 (77th)	The Incredibles	Michael Silvers and Randy Thom	Disney, Pixar	Won	
2004 (77th)	The Polar Express	Randy Thom and Dennis Leonard	Castle Rock Entertainment, Shangri-La Entertainment, ImageMovers	Nominated	
2007 (80th)	Ratatouille	Randy Thom and Michael Silvers	Disney, Pixar	Nominated	
2008 (81st)	WALL-E	Ben Burtt and Matthew Wood	Disney, Pixar	Nominated	
2009 (82nd)	Up	Michael Silvers and Tom Myers	Disney, Pixar	Nominated	
2010 (83rd)	Toy Story 3	Tom Myers and Michael Silvers	Disney, Pixar	Nominated	

=== Best Sound Mixing ===
Year	Film	Award Recipient(s)	Studio	Result	Ref.
2004 (77th)	The Incredibles	Randy Thom, Gary Rizzo, and Doc Kane	Disney, Pixar	Nominated	
2004 (77th)	The Polar Express	Randy Thom, Tom Johnson, Dennis S. Sands, and William B. Kaplan	Castle Rock Entertainment, Shangri-La Entertainment, ImageMovers	Nominated	
2007 (80th)	Ratatouille	Randy Thom, Michael Semanick and Doc Kane	Disney, Pixar	Nominated	
2008 (81st)	WALL-E	Tom Myers, Michael Semanick and Ben Burtt	Disney, Pixar	Nominated	

== Visual Effects ==
With the nomination of The Lion King in 2019, three animated films have been nominated for Best Visual Effects.

Year	Film	Award Recipient(s)	Studio	Result	Ref.
1993 (66th)	The Nightmare Before Christmas	Pete Kozachik, Eric Leighton, Ariel Velasco Shaw and Gordon Baker	Disney, Skellington Productions	Nominated	
2016 (89th)	Kubo and the Two Strings	Steve Emerson, Oliver Jones, Brian McLean, and Brad Schiff	Laika, Focus Features	Nominated	
2019 (92nd)	The Lion King	Robert Legato, Adam Valdez, Andrew R. Jones, and Elliot Newman	Disney	Nominated	

== Honorary Awards and Special Achievement Awards ==
Honorary Awards and Special Achievement Award are given to celebrate noted achievements in motion picture arts.

=== Honorary Awards ===
A handful of the honorary award recipients are awarded in their achievements in animated feature films.

Year	Award Recipient(s)	Citation	Ref.
1931/1932 (5th)	Walt Disney	"for the creation of Mickey Mouse"	
1938 (11th)	Disney	"for Snow White and the Seven Dwarfs, recognized as a significant screen innovation which has charmed millions and pioneered a great new entertainment field for the motion picture cartoon"	
1941 (14th)	Disney, William Garity, John N. A. Hawkins, and the RCA Manufacturing Company	"for their outstanding contribution to the advancement of the use of sound in motion pictures through the production of Fantasia"	
1941 (14th)	Leopold Stokowski and his associates	"for their unique achievement in the creation of a new form of visualized music in Walt Disney's production, Fantasia, thereby widening the scope of the motion picture as entertainment and as an art form"	
1943 (16th)	George Pal	"for the development of novel methods and techniques in the production of short subjects known as Puppetoons"	
1978 (51st)	Walter Lantz	"for bringing joy and laughter to every part of the world through his unique animated motion pictures"	
2014 (87th)	Hayao Miyazaki	"has deeply influenced animation forever, inspiring generations of artists to work in our medium and illuminate its limitless potential..."	
2026 (99th)	Floyd Norman	"for having broken barriers and inspired generations of artists over his remarkable career"	

=== Special Achievement Awards ===
Year	Award Recipient(s)	Citation
1988 (61st)	Richard Williams	"for the animation direction of Who Framed Roger Rabbit"
1995 (68th)	John Lasseter	"for his inspired leadership of the Pixar Toy Story team, resulting in the first feature-length computer-animated film"

== R-rated animated films ==
Films like Chico and Rita and I Lost My Body were not officially rated by the MPA due to their respective mature themes.

Year	Film	Category	Recipient(s)	Studio	Result	Ref.
1999 (72nd)	South Park: Bigger, Longer & Uncut	Best Original Song	"Blame Canada"; Trey Parker and Marc Shaiman (Music and Lyric)	Comedy Central Films, Scott Rudin Productions, Braniff Productions	Nominated	
2008 (81st)	Waltz With Bashir	Best International Feature Film	Israel, directed by Ari Folman	Bridgit Folman Film Gang, Les Films d'Ici, Razor Film Produktion	Nominated	
2015 (88th)	Anomalisa	Best Animated Feature	Charlie Kaufman, Duke Johnson, and Rosa Tran	Paramount Animation, Starburns Industries	Nominated	
2024 (97th)	Memoir of a Snail	Best Animated Feature	Adam Elliot and Liz Kearney	Arenamedia, Snails Pace Films, IFC Films	Nominated	

== Live-action/animated films ==
Live-action animated film blends various traditional animation or computer animation in live action films.

=== Competitive awards ===
Year	Film	Category	Award Recipient(s)	Result	Ref.
1943 (16th)	Saludos Amigos	Best Scoring of a Musical Picture	Edward H. Plumb, Paul J. Smith and Charles Wolcott	Nominated	
1943 (16th)	Saludos Amigos	Best Song	"Saludos Amigos"; Charles Wolcott (Music), Ned Washington (Lyric)	Nominated	
1943 (16th)	Saludos Amigos	Best Sound Recording	C. O. Slyfield, Walt Disney Studio Sound Department	Nominated	
1943 (16th)	Victory Through Air Power	Best Music Score of a Dramatic or Comedy Picture	Edward H. Plumb, Paul J. Smith and Oliver Wallace	Nominated	
1945 (18th)	Anchors Aweigh	Best Motion Picture	Joe Pasternak	Nominated	
1945 (18th)	Anchors Aweigh	Best Actor	Gene Kelly	Nominated	
1945 (18th)	Anchors Aweigh	Best Cinematography, Color	Robert Planck and Charles P. Boyle	Nominated	
1945 (18th)	Anchors Aweigh	Best Scoring of a Musical Picture	Georgie Stoll	Won	
1945 (18th)	Anchors Aweigh	Best Song	"I Fall in Love Too Easily"; Jule Styne (Music), Sammy Cahn (Lyric)	Nominated	
1945 (18th)	The Three Caballeros	Best Scoring of a Musical Picture	Edward H. Plumb, Paul J. Smith and Charles Wolcott	Nominated	
1945 (18th)	The Three Caballeros	Best Sound Recording	C. O. Slyfield, Walt Disney Studio Sound Department	Nominated	
1947 (20th)	Song of the South	Best Scoring of a Musical Picture	Daniele Amfitheatrof, Paul J. Smith and Charles Wolcott	Nominated	
1947 (20th)	Song of the South	Best Song	"Zip-a-Dee-Doo-Dah"; Allie Wrubel (Music), Ray Gilbert (Lyric)	Won	
1948 (22nd)	So Dear to My Heart	Best Song	"Lavender Blue (Dilly Dilly)"; Eliot Daniel (Music), Larry Morey (Lyric)	Nominated	
1964 (37th)	Mary Poppins	Best Picture	Walt Disney and Bill Walsh	Nominated	
1964 (37th)	Mary Poppins	Best Director	Robert Stevenson	Nominated	
1964 (37th)	Mary Poppins	Best Actress	Julie Andrews	Won	
1964 (37th)	Mary Poppins	Best Screenplay - Based on Material from Another Medium	Bill Walsh and Don DaGradi	Nominated	
1964 (37th)	Mary Poppins	Best Art Direction, Color	Carroll Clark and William H. Tuntke (Art Direction), Emile Kuri and Hal Gausman (Set Decoration)	Nominated	
1964 (37th)	Mary Poppins	Best Cinematography, Color	Edward Colman	Nominated	
1964 (37th)	Mary Poppins	Best Costume Design, Color	Tony Walton	Nominated	
1964 (37th)	Mary Poppins	Best Film Editing	Cotton Warburton	Won	
1964 (37th)	Mary Poppins	Best Original Song	"Chim Chim Cher-ee"; Richard M. Sherman and Robert B. Sherman (Music and Lyric)	Won	
1964 (37th)	Mary Poppins	Best Music Score - Substantially Original	Richard M. Sherman and Robert B. Sherman	Won	
1964 (37th)	Mary Poppins	Best Scoring of Music - Adaptation or Treatment	Irwin Kostal	Nominated	
1964 (37th)	Mary Poppins	Best Sound	Robert O. Cook	Nominated	
1964 (37th)	Mary Poppins	Best Special Visual Effects	Peter Ellenshaw, Hamilton Luske and Eustace Lycett	Won	
1971 (44th)	Bedknobs and Broomsticks	Best Art Direction	John B. Mansbridge and Peter Ellenshaw (Art Direction), Emile Kuri and Hal Gausman (Set Decoration)	Nominated	
1971 (44th)	Bedknobs and Broomsticks	Best Costume Design	Bill Thomas	Nominated	
1971 (44th)	Bedknobs and Broomsticks	Best Scoring: Adaptation and Original Song Score	Richard M. Sherman and Robert B. Sherman (songs) Irwin Kostal (adaptation score)	Nominated	
1971 (44th)	Bedknobs and Broomsticks	Best Original Song	"The Age of Not Believing"; Richard M. Sherman and Robert B. Sherman (Music and Lyric)	Nominated	
1971 (44th)	Bedknobs and Broomsticks	Best Special Visual Effects	Alan Maley, Eustace Lycett, Danny Lee	Won	
1977 (50th)	Pete's Dragon	Best Original Song Score and Its Adaptation or Adaptation Score	Joel Hirschhorn and Al Kasha (songs), Irwin Kostal (adaptation score)	Nominated	
1977 (50th)	Pete's Dragon	Best Original Song	"Candle on the Water"; Joel Hirschhorn and Al Kasha (Music and Lyric)	Nominated	
1988 (61st)	Who Framed Roger Rabbit	Best Art Direction	Elliot Scott (Art Decoration), Peter Howitt (Set Decoration)	Nominated	
1988 (61st)	Who Framed Roger Rabbit	Best Cinematography	Dean Cundey	Nominated	
1988 (61st)	Who Framed Roger Rabbit	Best Film Editing	Arthur Schmidt	Won	
1988 (61st)	Who Framed Roger Rabbit	Best Sound	Robert Knudson, John Boyd, Don Digirolamo and Tony Dawe	Nominated	
1988 (61st)	Who Framed Roger Rabbit	Best Sound Effects Editing	Charles L. Campbell and Louis Edemann	Won	
1988 (61st)	Who Framed Roger Rabbit	Best Visual Effects	Ken Ralston, Richard Williams, Ed Jones and George Gibbs	Won	
1996 (69th)	James and the Giant Peach	Best Original Musical or Comedy Score	Randy Newman	Nominated	
2007 (80th)	Enchanted	Best Original Song	"Happy Working Song"; Alan Menken (Music), Stephen Schwartz (Lyric)	Nominated	
2007 (80th)	Enchanted	Best Original Song	"So Close"; Alan Menken (Music), Stephen Schwartz (Lyric)	Nominated	
2007 (80th)	Enchanted	Best Original Song	"That's How You Know"; Alan Menken (Music), Stephen Schwartz (Lyrics)	Nominated	
2013 (86th)	Saving Mr. Banks	Best Original Score	Thomas Newman	Nominated	
2018 (91st)	Mary Poppins Returns	Best Costume Design	Sandy Powell	Nominated	
2018 (91st)	Mary Poppins Returns	Best Original Score	Marc Shaiman	Nominated	
2018 (91st)	Mary Poppins Returns	Best Original Song	"The Place Where Lost Things Go"; Marc Shaiman (Music and Lyric), Scott Wittman (Lyric)	Nominated	
2018 (91st)	Mary Poppins Returns	Best Production Design	John Myhre (Production Design), Gordon Sim (Set Decoration)	Nominated	

=== Honorary awards ===
Year	Award Recipient(s)	Citation	Ref.
1946 (20th)	James Baskett	"for his able and heart-warming characterization of Uncle Remus, friend and story teller to the children of the world in Walt Disney's Song of the South"	
1949 (22nd)	Bobby Driscoll	"as the outstanding juvenile actor of 1949" (for his roles in So Dear to My Heart and The Window)	

== Multiple numbers ==
There are at least two nominations of a single film appeared in a list.

Film	Wins	Nominations
Beauty and the Beast	2	6
WALL-E	1	6
Aladdin	2	5
Toy Story 3	2	5
Up	2	5
Ratatouille	1	5
The Incredibles	2	4
The Lion King	2	4
Finding Nemo	1	4
Monsters, Inc.	1	4
The Little Mermaid	2	3
Soul	2	3
Encanto	1	3
Bambi	0	3
Cinderella	0	3
Flee	0	3
The Polar Express	0	3
The Princess and the Frog	0	3
The Wild Robot	0	3
Toy Story	0	3
Coco	2	2
Frozen	2	2
KPop Demon Hunters	2	2
Pinocchio	2	2
Pocahontas	2	2
Dumbo	1	2
Flow	1	2
Inside Out	1	2
The Prince of Egypt	1	2
Shrek	1	2
Toy Story 4	1	2
Anastasia	0	2
Cars	0	2
Despicable Me 2	0	2
Fantastic Mr. Fox	0	2
How to Train Your Dragon	0	2
Kubo and the Two Strings	0	2
Isle of Dogs	0	2
Moana	0	2
Shrek 2	0	2
The Triplets of Belleville	0	2

== Notes ==
- Beauty and the Beast (1991) and WALL-E (2008) have 6 nominations, both shares their most nominations for an animated film.
- Are the first and only animated films to be nominated in each categories (and sometimes win) without Disney and Pixar's involvement.
  - The Polar Express (2004) received two technical nominations, Best Sound Editing and Mixing and was the only non-Disney animated film to be nominated in the Sound Design categories until The Wild Robot (2024).
  - The Prince of Egypt (1998) won Best Original Song and was the only non-Disney animated film to win Best Original Song until KPop Demon Hunters (2025).
  - Kubo and the Two Strings (2016) nominated for Best Visual Effects.
  - Shrek (2001) nominated for Best Adapted Screenplay.
- Also some of the first adult animated films to be nominated in each categories.
  - The Triplets of Belleville (2003) is rated PG-13 by the MPAA, the first PG-13 rated to be nominated for Best Animated Feature and Original Song.
  - Isle of Dogs (2018) is rated PG-13 by the MPAA, the first PG-13 rated to be nominated for Best Original Score.
  - South Park: Bigger, Longer & Uncut (1999) is rated R by the MPAA, the first R-rated to be nominated for Best Original Song.
  - Waltz with Bashir (2008) is rated R by the MPAA, the first to be nominated for Best Foreign Language Film, representing Israel.
