= Brian Chumney =

American sound editor

- Education: Middle Tennessee State University
- Occupation: Sound editor

Brian Chumney is an American sound editor. He was nominated for two Academy Awards in the category Best Sound for the films West Side Story and The Wild Robot.

== Selected filmography ==
- West Side Story (2021; co-nominated with Tod A. Maitland, Gary Rydstrom, Andy Nelson and Shawn Murphy)
- The Wild Robot (2024; co-nominated with Randy Thom, Gary A. Rizzo and Leff Lefferts)
