= Andre Fenley =

American Sound Editor

- Born: San Francisco, California
- Education: San Francisco State University
- Occupations: Sound editor, Foley editor, sound designer, First Assistant Sound Editor dialogue editor, Supervising Sound Editor and Assistant director
- Years active: 1990–present
- Relatives: Tiffany Derry (cousin)

André Fenley (often spelled Andre Fenley) is an Academy Award winning American supervising sound editor, Foley editor, first Assistant Sound Editor, sound designer, dialogue editor, sound designer and assistant director, film editor from San Francisco, California who spent much of his career sound editing at Skywalker Sound. As a sound editor, his credits include Iron Man, Minority Report, The Lion King, The Jungle Book, Fight Club and Jurassic Park.

== Filmography ==
=== 1990s ===
- Jurassic Park (1993)
- The Meteor Man (1993)
- Baby's Day Out (1994)
- Quiz Show (1994)
- Miracle on 34th Street (1994)
- Casper (1995)
- Nine Months (1995)
- Strange Days (1995)
- Jumanji (1995)
- The Arrival (1996)
- Mars Attacks! (1996)
- Boys Night Out (Short) (1996)
- B*A*P*S (1996)
- The Lost World: Jurassic Park (1997)
- Saving Private Ryan (1998)
- Halloween H20: 20 Years Later (1998)
- Dogma (1999)
- Fight Club (1999)

=== 2000s ===
- The Prophecy 3: The Ascent (Video) (2000)
- Dinosaur (2000)
- The Legend of Bagger Vance (2000)
- Wes Craven Presents: Dracula 2000 (2000)
- A.I. Artificial Intelligence (2001)
- Lilo & Stitch (2002)
- Minority Report (2002)
- Hulk (2003)
- Peter Pan (2003)
- Shrek 2 (2004)
- Catwoman (2004)
- Lorelei: The Witch of the Pacific Ocean (2005)
- xXx: State of the Union (2005)
- Rent (2005)
- Munich (2005)
- Lady in the Water (2006)
- Zodiac (2006)
- The Kite Runner (2007)
- Lions for Lambs (2007)
- Iron Man (2008)
- Bolt (2008)
- My Bloody Valentine (2009)
- Ice Age: Dawn of the Dinosaurs (2009)
- Waking Sleeping Beauty (Documentary) (2009)

=== 2010s ===
- Fanny, Annie & Danny (2010)
- Iron Man 2 (2010)
- The Conspirator (2010)
- Cowboys & Aliens (2011)
- Mission: Impossible – Ghost Protocol (2011)
- Wreck-It Ralph (2012)
- Epic (2013)
- All Is Lost (2013)
- A Bit of Bad Luck (2014)
- How to Train Your Dragon 2 (2014)
- Maleficent (2014)
- A Most Violent Year (2014)
- Avengers: Age of Ultron (2015)
- The Other Kids (2016)
- The Jungle Book (2016)
- Kong: Skull Island (2017)
- Only the Brave (2017)
- A Wrinkle in Time (2018)
- It's Snowing Outside (Short) (2019)
- 'Til Death (Short) (2019)
- The Lion King (2019)

=== 2020s ===
- Dolittle (2020)
- Second Team (Short) (2020)
- Green Cobra (Short) (2020)
- Canvas (Short) (2020)
- West Side Story (2021)
- Rumors of War (Short) (2022)
- I’m a Virgo (2023)
- Peter Pan & Wendy (2023)
- Haunted Mansion (2023)
- Origin (2023)
- Twisters (2024)
- Lilo & Stitch (2025)

=== As assistant director ===
- Daughters (1997)

== Discography ==
=== Studio albums ===
List of albums worked on, with selected details
Title	Album details	Charts	Role
20s A Difficult Age	Artist: Marcus Orelias; Released: August 26, 2017; Format: Streaming, Digital download; Label: R.O.T.U. Records / R.O.T.U. World	79 (ITunes Germany)	Foley, Sound Design

== Awards ==
Year	Award	Category	Type	Title
2020	Golden Reel Award	Supervising Sound Editor	Nominated	Canvas
2017	Golden Reel Award	Best Sound Editing - Sound Effects and Foley in a Feature Film	Nominated	The Jungle Book
2014	Golden Reel Award	Best Sound Editing - Sound Effects, Foley, Dialogue and ADR in an Animation Feature Film	Won	Epic
2005	Golden Reel Award	Best Sound Editing in Feature Film - Animated	Nominated	Shrek 2
1999	Academy Awards	Sound Effects Editing Assistant	Won	Saving Private Ryan

== Education ==
André attended film school at San Francisco State University where he graduated and joined fellow sound engineer, Richard Hymns as an apprentice for the film The Meteor Man but he states “the early turning point in his career was being offered a position on the crew for Jurassic Park.

== Influences ==
In a 2021 interview with cinemotage, André states fellow artists, Paul Robeson, Gordon Parks, Melvin Van Peebles, and Spike Lee amongst his influences. He also cites mentors, Richard Hymns and Frank Eulner amongst such. Films that inspired André to pursue a career in film include, “Buck and the Preacher,” “Shaft,” and “Do The Right Thing.”

== Personal life ==
André is the cousin of celebrity chef Tiffany Derry.
