= Leff Lefferts =

American sound editor

- Occupation: Sound editor

Leff Lefferts is an American sound editor. He was nominated for an Academy Award in the category Best Sound for the film The Wild Robot.

In addition to his Academy Award nomination, he was nominated for a Primetime Emmy Award in the category Outstanding Sound Editing for his work on the television program McCartney 3,2,1. His nomination was shared with Jonathan Greber, Bjorn Ole Schroeder, E. Larry Oatfield and Kim Foscato. In 2026, He won an Emmy Award for Outstanding Sound Mixing and Sound Editing for an Animated Program for his work on Ultraman: Rising. His win was shared with Gary A. Rizzo, Brian Chumney, Samson Neslund, Jamey Scott, Christopher Manning, John Cucci, Dan O'Connell, Rich Quinn and Randy Thom.

== Selected filmography ==
- The Wild Robot (2024; co-nominated with Randy Thom, Brian Chumney and Gary Rizzo)
