= John Pospisil =

American sound editor

- Other names: John Popisil; John P.
- Occupation: Sound editor
- Years active: 1982-2018

John Pospisil is an American sound editor with more than 50 major film credits, including such varied movies as Edward Scissorhands, From Dusk till Dawn, Lion King, Ocean's 13, and RoboCop. He has received seven Golden Reel Awards, as well as (with Stephen Hunter Flick) a Special Achievement Academy Award for Best Sound Editing at the 60th Academy Awards for the film RoboCop.

== Selected filmography ==
- Spider-Man: Across the Spider-Verse (2023)
- Kimi (2022)
- The Mitchells vs. the Machines (2021)
- Spider-Man: Into the Spider-Verse (2018)
- Hotel Transylvania 3: Summer Vacation (2018)
- The Emoji Movie (2017)
- Phoenix Forgotten (2017)
- Jim Henson's Turkey Hollow (2015)
- Attack of the 50 Ft. Gummi Bear (2014)
- Cloudy with a Chance of Meatballs 2 (2013)
- Hotel Transylvania (2012)
- Contagion (2011)
- Cloudy with a Chance of Meatballs (2009)
- Max Payne (2008)
- Ocean's Thirteen (2007)
- Serenity (2005)
- Spy Kids 3D: Game Over (2003)
- Time Machine (2002)
- Planet of the Apes (2001)
- The Green Mile (1999)
- Sleepy Hollow (1999)
- Virus (1999)
- Lethal Weapon 4 (1998)
- Small Soldiers (1998)
- The Fifth Element (1997)
- From Dusk till Dawn (1996)
- Twister (1996)
- Apollo 13 (1995)
- The Lion King (1994)
- Hard Target (1993)
- Matinee (1993)
- The Nightmare Before Christmas (1993)
- Aladdin (1992)
- Batman Returns (1992)
- The Addams Family (1991)
- Beauty and the Beast (1991)
- Edward Scissorhands (1990)
- Predator 2 (1990)
- RoboCop 2 (1990)
- Tremors (1990)
- The 'Burbs (1989)
- Star Trek V: The Final Frontier (1989)
- Alien Nation (1988)
- Innerspace (1987)
- Predator (1987)
- RoboCop (1987)
- Star Trek IV: The Voyage Home (1986)
- Brewster's Millions (1985)
- Explorers (1985)
- 2010 (1984)
