= Michael Silvers =

American sound editor

- Occupation: sound editor
- Years active: 1978–present

Michael Silvers is a sound editor who has often worked with Pixar. He has worked on nearly every Pixar feature film.

He has over 110 credits to his name.

== Oscar history ==
All of these films were for Best Sound Editing.

- 74th Academy Awards-Nominated for Monsters, Inc.. Nomination shared with Gary Rydstrom.
- 76th Academy Awards-Nominated for Finding Nemo. Nomination shared with Gary Rydstrom.
- 77th Academy Awards-The Incredibles. Shared with Randy Thom. Won.
- 80th Academy Awards-Nominated for Ratatouille. Nominated shared with Randy Thom.
- 82nd Academy Awards-Nominated for Up. Nomination shared with Tom Myers.
- 83rd Academy Awards-Nominated for Toy Story 3. Nomination shared with Tom Myers.
