= Christopher Scarabosio =

Sound editor

- Other name: Chris Scarabosio
- Occupation: Sound editor
- Years active: 1988–present
- Children: 3

Christopher Scarabosio is a sound editor who started working in sound on Gumby Adventures (1988) as a Sound Effects Assistant, and later as a Sound Editor on The Young Indiana Jones Chronicles. He usually works at Skywalker Sound.

He was nominated at the 80th Academy Awards for the film There Will Be Blood in the category of Best Sound Editing, shared with Matthew Wood. He has, also, received two nominations for the Academy Award for Best Sound Mixing, for his work on Star Wars: The Force Awakens (with Andy Nelson and Stuart Wilson), and Rogue One: A Star Wars Story (with David Parker and, again, Stuart Wilson).

== Filmography ==
He has worked on over 100 films to date since 1992 including...

- Volcano – Sound Effects Editor
- Titan A.E. – Sound Effects Editor/Assistant Sound Designer/Voice of the Drej Queen
- Titanic – Sound Effects Editor
- Young Indiana Jones (TV show and movies) – Sound Editor, Sound Designer (uncredited?)
- Star Wars: Episode I – The Phantom Menace – Sound Effects Editor/Voice of Neimoidian Senator
- Star Wars: Episode II – Attack of the Clones – Sound FU, Additional Sound Effects (uncredited?)
- Star Wars: Episode III – Revenge of the Sith – Dialogue Editor/Re-Recording Mixer
- Star Wars: The Clone Wars TV show – Re-Recording Mixer (season 1 & 4) and Sound Editor (Shades of Reason)
- Hellboy – Sound Effects Editor
- Pearl Harbor – Sound Editor, Sound Design Editor (uncredited?)
- Armageddon – Sound Editor
- Avatar – Sound Effects Editor
- Tron Legacy – Sound Effects Editor
- Whip It – Supervising Sound Editor/Re-Recording Mixer
- Ice Age: The Meltdown – Sound Mixing
- Eragon – Additional Re-Recording Mixer
- Gumby Adventures – Sound Effects Assistant
- The Simpsons Movie – Sound Designer/Additional Re-Recording Mixer
- Despicable Me – Sound Designer/Supervising Sound Editor/Re-Recording Mixer
- Despicable Me 2 – Sound Designer/Additional Re-Recording Mixer
- Minions – Sound Designer/Re-Recording Mixer
- Zoom – Sound Designer/Supervising Sound Mixer
- In God's Hands – Sound Designer/Supervising Sound Editor (uncredited roles)
- Lilo & Stitch – Sound Effects Editor, Additional Sound Effects (uncredited?)
- The Grand Budapest Hotel – Supervising Sound Editor and Re-Recording Mixer
- Junun – Re-Recording Mixer
- There Will Be Blood – Sound Designer, Additional Re-Recording Mixer (uncredited?)
- The Master – Sound Designer/Supervising Sound Editor/Re-Recording Mixer
- Inherent Vice – Sound Designer/Supervising Sound Editor/Re-Recording Mixer
- Munich – Sound Effects Editor/Re-Recording Mixer
- Indiana Jones and the Kingdom of the Crystal Skull – Additional Sound Design/Re-Recording Mixer
- The Investigator (1994 TV Movie) – Dialogue Editor
- Partly Cloudy – Sound Designer
- The Pardon – Sound Designer/Re-Recording Mixer
- Rogue One: A Star Wars Story – Sound Designer/Re-Recording Mixer
- Chef – Sound Effects Editor
- Hanna – Sound Designer/Supervising Sound Editor/Re-Recording Mixer
- The Soloist – Sound Designer/Supervising Sound Editor/Re-Recording Mixer
