= Christopher Barnett =

British sound editor

Christopher Barnet
- Occupations: Sound editor, re-recording mixer, musician
- Years active: 1990–present

Christopher Barnett is a British supervising sound editor, re-recording mixer and music mixer at Skywalker Sound.

== Filmography ==
- The Little Prince (2016) - Supervising Sound Editor
- Racing Dreams (2009) - Supervising Sound Editor

== Awards ==
- Winner, 2014 Motion Picture Sound Editors Golden Reel Award for the movie Dirty Wars
