= Dennis Leonard (sound editor) =

Sound editor

- Occupation: Sound effects editor
- Years active: 1979–present

Dennis Leonard is a sound editor. He was nominated at the 77th Academy Awards for the film The Polar Express in the category of Best Sound Editing. His nomination was shared with Randy Thom.

== Selected filmography ==
- Tucker: The Man and His Dream (1988) - Post-Production Sound Engineer (uncredited)
- All Dogs Go To Heaven (1989) - rumored to be Supervising Sound Editor (on IMDb as of December 2013)
- All Dogs Go To Heaven 2 (1995) - rumored to be Supervising Sound Editor (on IMDb as of December 2013)
- Species (1995) - Additional Sound Designer/Sound Editor (uncredited)
- What Lies Beneath (2000) - Supervising Sound Editor, Skywalker Sound Administrator/Additional Foley Artist (uncredited)
- Cast Away (2000)
- Harry Potter and the Chamber of Secrets (2002)
- Shrek 2 (2004)
- The Polar Express (2004)
- Harry Potter and the Goblet of Fire (2005)
- Enchanted (2007)
- Madagascar: Escape 2 Africa (2008)
- Horton Hears a Who! (2008)
- A Christmas Carol (2009)
- Merry Madagascar (2009)
- Despicable Me (2010)
- Rio (2011) - Additional Re-Recording Mixer (uncredited)
- Cowboys & Aliens (2011) - Additional Re-Recording Mixer (uncredited)
- Olive (2011) - Supervising Sound Editor (as Dennis "Wiz" Leonard)/Role: Doctor
- Madagascar 3: Europe's Most Wanted (2012)
- The Lorax (2012)
- Flight (2012) - Sound Designer & Supervising Sound Editor (according to Soundworks Collection), Supervising Sound Editor/Re-Recording Mixer
- Despicable Me 2 (2013)
- Free Birds (2013)
- War Story (2014) - Sound Designer/Re-Recording Mixer, Supervising Sound Editor/Re-Recording Mixer (according to Skywalker Sound and IMDb's bio pages)
- Minions (2015)
