= Eliot Connors =

American sound editor

- Occupation: Sound editor
- Years active: 2014–present

Eliot Connors is an American sound editor. He won a Primetime Emmy Award and was nominated for another one in the category Outstanding Sound Editing for his work on the television program Arcane.
