= Frank E. Eulner =

- Born: 1963 (age 62–63); Little Silver, NJ
- Died: 21 October 2021 (aged 57–58); California
- Occupation: Sound editor
- Years active: 1986–2021
- Spouse: Barbara Eulner
- Children: 2

Frank E. Eulner (born 1963 - October 21, 2021) was a sound editor and a member of Skywalker Sound. He was nominated for Best Sound Editing for the film Iron Man at the 81st Academy Awards. His nomination was shared with Christopher Boyes.

He had over 70 sound editing credits since 1986.
