= Tom Myers (sound engineer) =

American sound engineer

- Occupation: Sound engineer
- Years active: 1990–present

Tom Myers is an American sound engineer. He has been nominated for 3 Academy Awards; one for Best Sound Mixing and two for Best Sound Editing. He has worked on more than 100 films since 1990.

== Selected filmography ==
- Mission: Impossible (1996)
- Geri's Game (1997)
- Grandia (1997)
- Quest for Camelot (1998)
- For the Birds (2000)
- Monsters, Inc. (2001)
- Star Wars: Episode II – Attack of the Clones (2002)
- Bayside Shakedown 2 (2003)
- Star Wars: Episode III – Revenge of the Sith (2005)
- Cars (2006)
- WALL-E (2008) – Best Sound
- Up (2009) – Best Sound Editing
- Toy Story 3 (2010) – Best Sound Editing
- 009 Re:Cyborg (2012)
- Kong: Skull Island (2017)
