= Randy Thom =

American sound designer (born 1951)

- Born: David Randall Thom; August 21, 1951 (age 75); Shreveport, Louisiana, U.S.
- Occupation: Sound Design
- Years active: 1971–present

David Randall Thom (born August 21, 1951) is an American sound designer and the director of sound design at Skywalker Sound.

== Career ==
Thom started his film career with a phone call to Walter Murch, who invited him to visit a re-mix of American Graffiti. Thom introduced himself to Murch, Ben Burtt, and Mark Berger, and said he had been working for a radio station in Berkeley, and wanted to work in film sound.

== Filmography ==
Year	Title	Role	Notes
1979	Apocalypse Now	Post-production sound effects recordist	
1983	Koyaanisqatsi	Sound effects recordist	
1983	Star Wars Episode VI: Return of the Jedi	Production sound mixer, re-recording mixer	
1983	Never Cry Wolf	Sound mixer - Saul Zaentz	
1983	The Right Stuff	Sound re-recording mixer, sound effects recordist (uncredited) - Saul Zaentz	
1984	Indiana Jones and the Temple of Doom	Re-recording mixer	
1985	Grand Canyon: The Hidden Secrets	Sound designer, re-recording mixer (uncredited)	
1985	Latino	Sound designer, re-recording mixer	
1987	Spaceballs	Sound designer, re-recording mixer	
1987	Gardens of Stone	Re-recording mixer	
1988	Colors	Sound designer, re-recording mixer	
1988	Tucker: The Man and His Dream	Re-recording mixer	
1989	Romero	Sound re-recording mixer	
1989	Always	Re-recording mixer, foley artist	
1990	Wild at Heart	Sound designer, re-recording mixer	
1990	Loom	Sound design consultant: Audio Book Cassette	
1991	Backdraft	Re-recording mixer	
1991	A Brief History of Time	Sound effects, re-recording mixer	
1994	Miracle on 34th Street	Sound designer, re-recording mixer, supervising sound editor (uncredited)	
1994	Forrest Gump	Sound designer, re-recording mixer, supervising sound editor (uncredited)	
1995	Jumanji	Sound designer, re-recording mixer, supervising sound editor (uncredited)	
1995	Species	Re-recording mixer	
1996	The Frighteners	Sound designer, re-recording mixer, supervising sound editor (uncredited)	
1996	Mars Attacks!	Sound designer, re-recording mixer, supervising sound editor (uncredited)	
1996	Chain Reaction	Sound designer, supervising sound editor (uncredited)	
1997	FairyTale: A True Story	Additional sound designer	
1997	Contact	Sound designer, re-recording mixer, supervising sound editor (uncredited)	
1998	Stepmom	Re-recording mixer	
1999	Arlington Road	Sound designer, re-recording mixer	
1999	Snow Falling on Cedars	Re-recording mixer	
1999	The Iron Giant	Sound designer, supervising sound editor (uncredited)	
1999	Bicentennial Man	Sound designer, re-recording mixer	
2000	Reindeer Games	Sound designer	
2000	What Lies Beneath	Sound designer, re-recording mixer, supervising sound editor (uncredited)	
2000	Cast Away	Sound designer, re-recording mixer, supervising sound editor (uncredited)	
2001	Osmosis Jones	Sound designer, supervising sound editor (uncredited)	
2001	Final Fantasy: The Spirits Within	Sound designer, re-recording mixer, supervising sound editor (uncredited)	
2002	Windtalkers	Supervising sound editor (uncredited), re-recording mixer	
2002	Harry Potter and the Chamber of Secrets	Sound designer, supervising sound editor	
2003	Darkness Falls	Sound designer, re-recording mixer	
2003	Lara Croft Tomb Raider: The Cradle of Life	Sound designer, re-recording mixer, supervising sound editor (uncredited)	
2004	Ghost in the Shell 2: Innocence	Sound designer	
2004	Shrek 2	Sound designer	
2004	The Polar Express	Sound designer, re-recording mixer, supervising sound editor (uncredited)	
2004	The Incredibles	Sound designer, re-recording mixer, supervising sound editor	
2005	War of the Worlds	Additional sound designer, additional supervising sound editor (uncredited)	
2005	Harry Potter and the Goblet of Fire	Sound designer, supervising sound editor	
2006	Ice Age: The Meltdown	Sound designer, re-recording mixer, supervising sound editor	
2006	Over the Hedge	Re-recording mixer	
2006	Monster House	Sound designer, re-recording mixer, supervising sound editor	
2006	Eragon	Sound designer, re-recording mixer, supervising sound editor	
2007	Ratatouille	Sound designer, re-recording mixer, supervising sound editor (uncredited)	
2007	The Simpsons Movie	Sound designer, supervising sound editor (uncredited)	
2007	Bee Movie	Sound designer	
2007	Enchanted	Sound designer, re-recording mixer, supervising sound editor	
2007	Beowulf	Sound designer, re-recording mixer, supervising sound editor (uncredited)	
2008	Standard Operating Procedure	Sound designer (uncredited), supervising sound editor	
2008	Dr. Seuss' Horton Hears a Who!	Sound designer, re-recording mixer, supervising sound editor	
2008	Bolt	Sound designer, re-recording mixer, supervising sound editor (uncredited)	
2008	Madagascar: Escape 2 Africa	Sound designer	
2009	Coraline	Sound designer, re-recording mixer, supervising sound editor (uncredited)	
2009	Ice Age: Dawn of the Dinosaurs	Sound designer, re-recording mixer, supervising sound editor (uncredited)	
2009	A Christmas Carol	Sound designer, re-recording mixer, supervising sound editor (uncredited)	
2010	Percy Jackson & the Olympians: The Lightning Thief	Sound designer, re-recording mixer, supervising sound editor	
2010	How to Train Your Dragon	Voice of Toothless, sound designer, re-recording mixer, supervising sound editor	
2010	Despicable Me	Sound designer consultant, supervising sound editor (uncredited)	
2010	The Last Airbender	Sound designer, re-recording mixer, supervising sound editor (uncredited)	
2011	Mars Needs Moms	Sound designer, re-recording mixer	
2011	Rio	Sound designer, re-recording mixer, supervising sound editor	
2012	The Lorax	Sound designer, re-recording mixer, supervising sound editor	
2012	Ice Age: Continental Drift	Sound designer, re-recording mixer, supervising sound editor, additional voices	
2012	Flight	Sound designer, re-recording mixer, supervising sound editor	
2013	The Croods	Voice of Sandy Crood, sound designer, re-recording mixer, supervising sound editor, ADR group	
2013	Epic	Sound designer, re-recording mixer, supervising sound editor (uncredited)	
2013	Free Birds	Sound designer, Re-recording mixer, supervising sound editor (uncredited)	
2014	Rio 2	Sound designer, re-recording mixer, supervising sound editor (uncredited)	
2014	How to Train Your Dragon 2	Voice of Toothless, sound designer, re-recording mixer, supervising sound editor	
2015	Home	Sound designer, supervising sound editor (uncredited)	
2015	The Peanuts Movie	Sound designer, re-recording mixer, supervising sound editor, additional voices: Snoopy vocals	
2015	Crimson Peak	Sound designer, supervising sound editor	
2015	The Walk	Sound designer, supervising sound editor, re-recording mixer	
2016	Pete's Dragon	Additional supervising sound designer	
2017	Despicable Me 3	Re-recording mixer, sound designer consultant	
2017	Ferdinand	Sound designer, re-recording mixer, supervising sound editor	
2019	How to Train Your Dragon: The Hidden World	Voices of Toothless and Light Fury, sound designer	
2019	Spies in Disguise	Sound designer, re-recording mixer, supervising sound editor (uncredited)	
2019	Abominable	Special thanks	
2020	The Croods: A New Age	Sound designer, re-recording mixer (uncredited), supervising sound editor (uncredited), ADR group	
2020	The Witches	Sound designer, re-recording mixer	
2021	Vivo	Sound designer, re-recording mixer, additional voices	
2022	Wendell & Wild	Sound designer	
2023	The Super Mario Bros. Movie	Sound designer, supervising sound editor (uncredited)	
2024	The Wild Robot	Voice of the RECOs, supervising sound designer	
2024	Ultraman: Rising	supervising sound designer	

== Awards ==
=== Academy Awards ===
- 2005 – Best Sound Editing, The Incredibles (shared with Michael Silvers)
- 1984 – Best Sound, The Right Stuff (shared with Mark Berger, Tom Scott and David MacMillan)

==== Nominations ====
- 2025 - Best Sound, The Wild Robot
- 2016 – Best Sound Mixing, The Revenant
- 2008 – Best Sound, Ratatouille
- 2008 – Best Sound Editing, Ratatouille
- 2005 – Best Sound Editing, The Polar Express
- 2005 – Best Sound Mixing, The Polar Express
- 2005 – Best Sound Mixing, The Incredibles
- 2001 – Best Sound Mixing, Cast Away
- 1998 – Best Sound Mixing, Contact
- 1995 – Best Sound Effects Editing, Forrest Gump
- 1995 – Best Sound, Forrest Gump
- 1992 – Best Sound, Backdraft
- 1984 – Best Sound, Never Cry Wolf
- 1984 – Best Sound, Return of the Jedi

=== British Academy Film Awards (BAFTA) ===
- 2016 - Best Sound, The Revenant

=== French Academy Awards (César) ===
- 2020 - Best Sound, The Wolf's Call

=== Emmy Awards ===
- 2025 - Outstanding Sound Editing and Sound Mixing for an Animated Program, Ultraman: Rising

==== Nominations ====
- 1986 - Outstanding Sound Mixing for a Miniseries or a Special, Ewoks: The Battle for Endor
