= List of accolades received by Skyfall =

Skyfall accolades
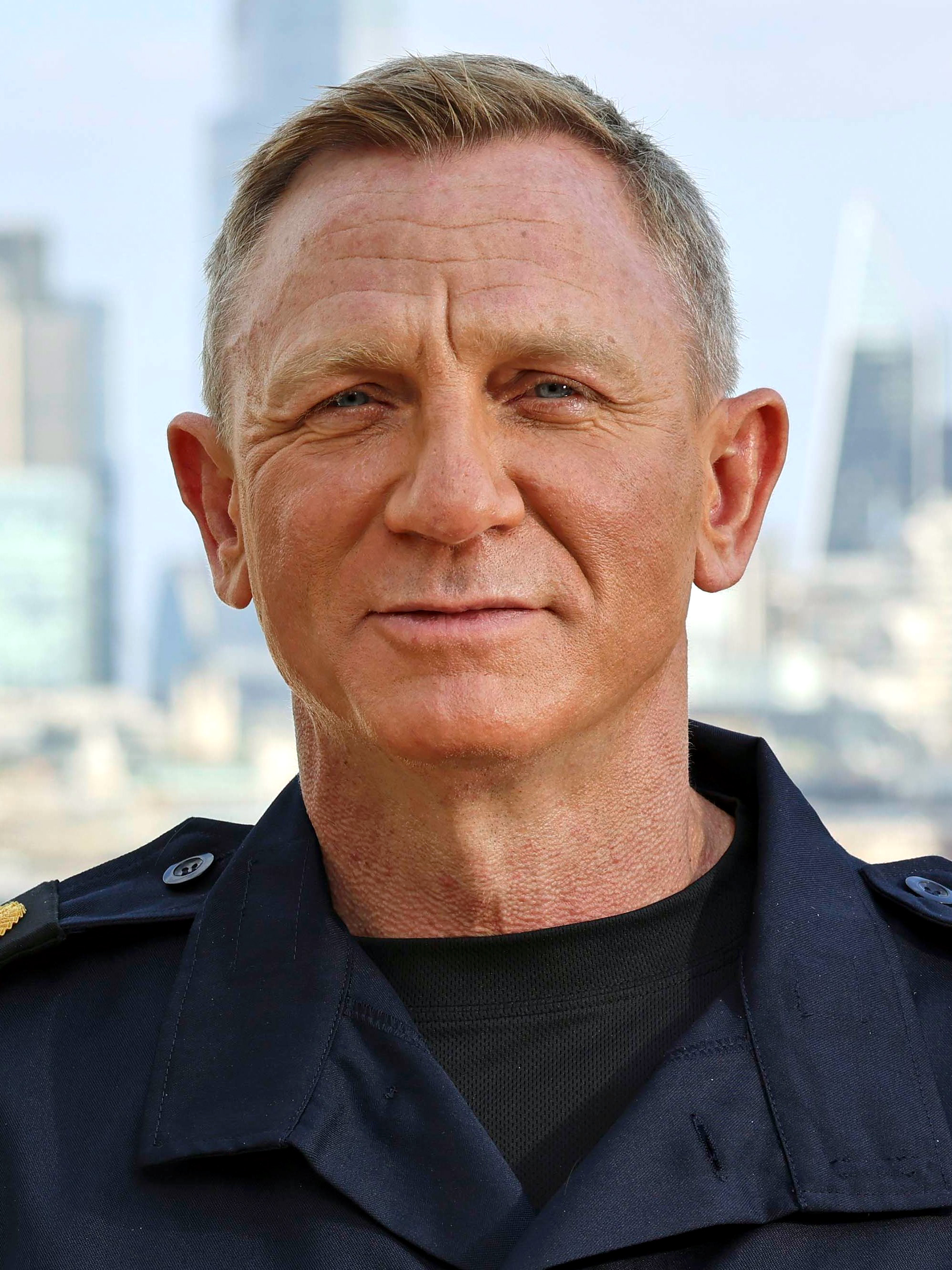
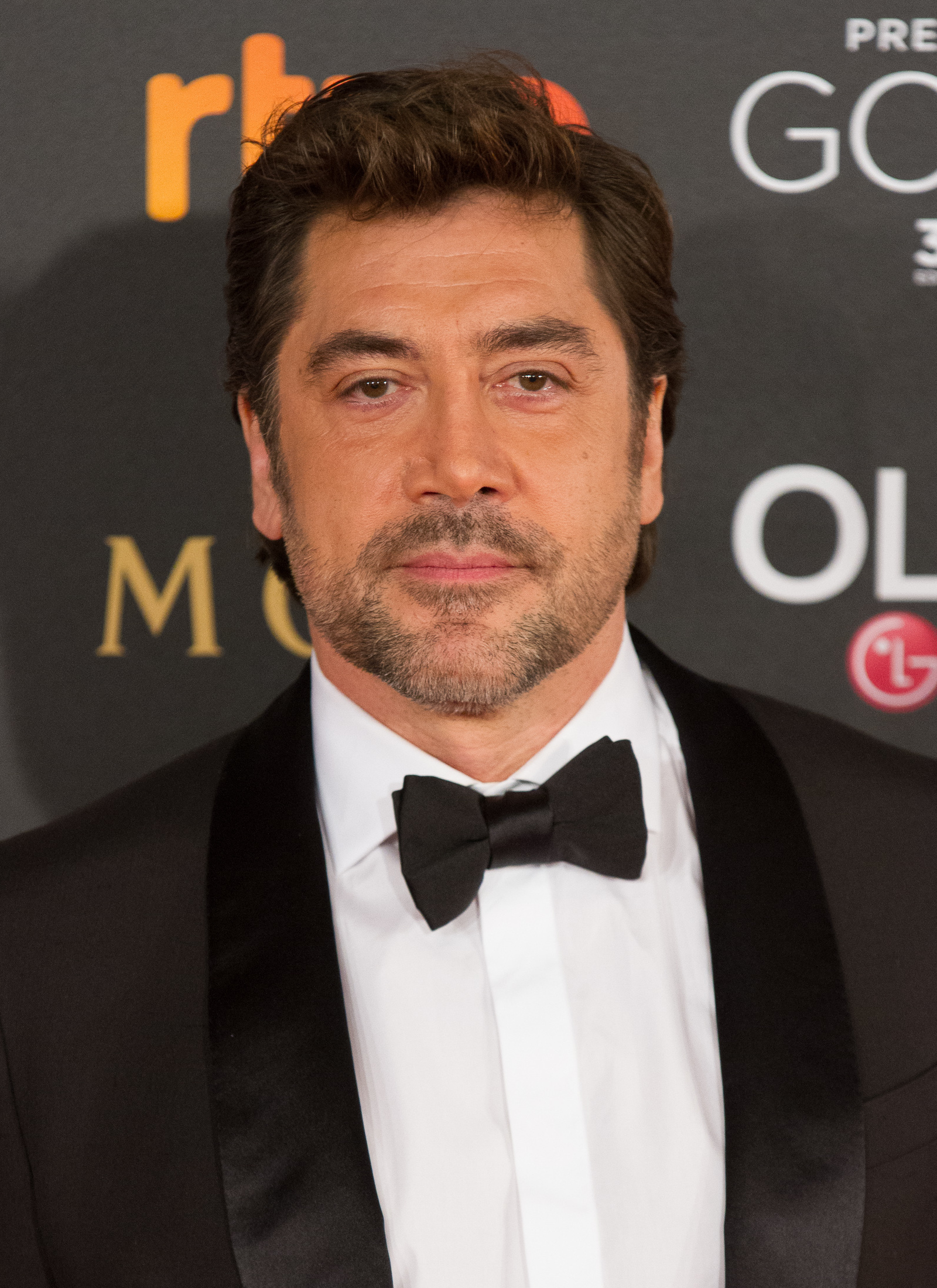
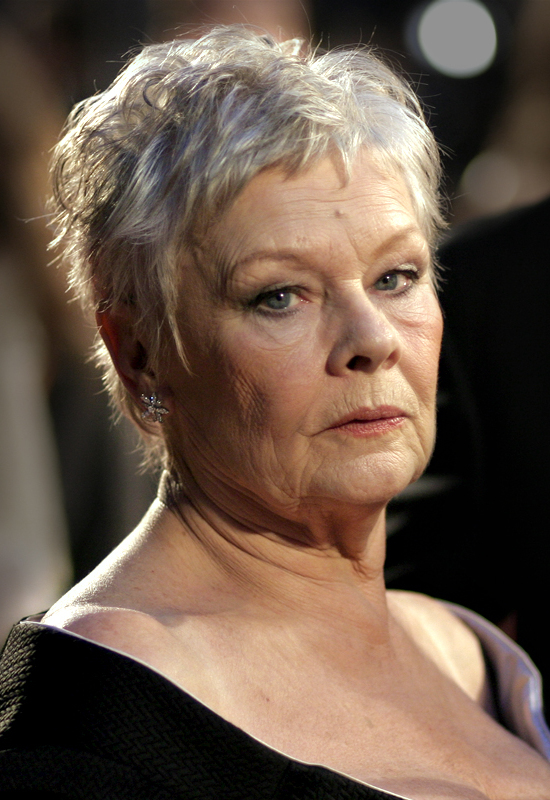
- Daniel Craig, Javier Bardem, and Judi Dench received multiple accolades for their roles in the film.
Awards and nominations
Award	Wins	Nominations
Academy Awards	2	5
Alliance of Women Film Journalists Awards	1	3
American Cinema Editors Awards	0	1
American Society of Cinematographers Awards	1	1
Art Directors Guild Awards	1	1
Black Reel Awards	1	1
BMI Film & TV Awards	1	1
British Academy Film Awards	2	8
Chicago Film Critics Association	0	3
Cinema Audio Society Awards	0	1
Costume Designers Guild Awards	1	1
Critics' Choice Movie Awards	4	7
Dallas–Fort Worth Film Critics Association	0	2
Empire Awards	2	6
Evening Standard British Film Awards	2	2
Florida Film Critics Circle Awards	1	1
Golden Globe Awards	1	1
Golden Reel Awards	1	3
Golden Trailer Awards	3	6
Grammy Awards	2	2
Houston Film Critics Society Awards	2	5
ICG Publicists Awards	0	1
International Cinephile Society Awards	0	1
International Film Music Critics Association Awards	1	1
Japan Academy Film Prize	0	1
London Film Critics' Circle Awards	0	5
Los Angeles Film Critics Association Awards	1	1
Movieguide Awards	0	1
MTV Movie Awards	0	4
National Society of Film Critics Awards	1	1
NME Awards	0	1
Online Film Critics Society Awards	1	2
Producers Guild of America Awards	0	1
Satellite Awards	1	7
Saturn Awards	1	7
Screen Actors Guild Awards	1	2
Screen Nation Film and Television Awards	1	1
St. Louis Film Critics Association Awards	1	1
Teen Choice Awards	0	3
Washington D.C. Area Film Critics Association Awards	0	2
World Soundtrack Awards	1	3

Totals (Note: Certain award groups do not simply award one winner. They acknowledge several different recipients, have runners-up, and have third place. Since this is a specific recognition and is different from losing an award, runner-up mentions are considered wins in this award tally. For simplification and to avoid errors, each award in this list has been presumed to have had a prior nomination.)
- Wins: 37
- Nominations: 107

Skyfall is a 2012 spy film based on the Ian Fleming character James Bond, produced by Eon Productions and distributed by Sony Pictures Releasing. It is the twenty-third Eon-produced James Bond film. Directed by Sam Mendes and written by Neal Purvis, Robert Wade, and John Logan, it stars Daniel Craig as Bond, alongside Javier Bardem, Ralph Fiennes, Naomie Harris, Bérénice Marlohe, Albert Finney, and Judi Dench. In the film, Bond investigates a series of targeted data leaks and co-ordinated attacks on MI6 led by cyberterrorist Raoul Silva (Bardem).

Skyfall debuted at the Royal Albert Hall on 23 October 2012, and was released on 26 October in the United Kingdom and on 9 November in the United States. Produced on a budget of $150–200 million, Skyfall grossed $1.109 billion worldwide, finishing its theatrical run as the second-highest-grossing film of 2012 and the seventh-highest-grossing film of all time; it ranked as Sony Pictures' highest-grossing film from December 2012 to August 2019. On the review aggregator website Rotten Tomatoes, the film holds an approval rating of 92% based on 388 reviews.

Skyfall garnered awards and nominations in various categories with particular recognition for Craig, Bardem, and Dench's performances as well as its cinematography, sound effects, and musical score. It received five nominations at the 85th Academy Awards, including Best Cinematography. The film won Best Sound Editing and Best Original Song ("Skyfall"). At the 66th British Academy Film Awards, Skyfall was nominated for Best Actor in a Supporting Role (Bardem), Best Actress in a Supporting Role (Dench), Best Cinematography, Best Editing, Best Production Design, and Best Sound; and won Best British Film and Best Film Music. It received seven nominations at the 18th Critics' Choice Awards and won Best Supporting Actress (Dench), Best Song ("Skyfall"), Best Action Movie, and Best Actor in an Action Movie (Craig). Adele and Paul Epworth won Best Original Song at the 70th Golden Globe Awards for the title song.

== Accolades ==
Accolades received by Skyfall
Award	Date of ceremony	Category	Recipient(s)	Result	Ref.
Academy Awards	24 February 2013	Best Cinematography	Roger Deakins	Nominated	
Academy Awards	24 February 2013	Best Original Score	Thomas Newman	Nominated	
Academy Awards	24 February 2013	Best Original Song	Adele and Paul Epworth for "Skyfall"	Won	
Academy Awards	24 February 2013	Best Sound Editing	Per Hallberg and Karen Baker Landers	Won (Note: Tied with Paul N. J. Ottosson for Zero Dark Thirty (2012))	
Academy Awards	24 February 2013	Best Sound Mixing	Stuart Wilson, Scott Millan, and Greg P. Russell	Nominated	
Alliance of Women Film Journalists Awards	7 January 2013	Best Cinematography	Roger Deakins	Nominated	
Alliance of Women Film Journalists Awards	7 January 2013	Actress Defying Age and Ageism	Judi Dench	Won	
Alliance of Women Film Journalists Awards	7 January 2013	Award for Humanitarian Activism – Female Icon Award	Judi Dench	Nominated	
American Cinema Editors Awards	16 February 2013	Best Edited Feature Film – Dramatic	Stuart Baird	Nominated	
American Society of Cinematographers Awards	10 February 2013	Outstanding Achievement in Cinematography in Theatrical Releases	Roger Deakins	Won	
Art Directors Guild Awards	2 February 2013	Excellence in Production Design for a Contemporary Film	Dennis Gassner	Won	
Black Reel Awards	7 February 2013	Best Supporting Actress	Naomie Harris	Won	
BMI Film & TV Awards	15 May 2013	BMI Film Music Awards	Thomas Newman	Won	
British Academy Film Awards	10 February 2013	Best British Film	Sam Mendes, Michael G. Wilson, Barbara Broccoli, Neal Purvis, Robert Wade, and John Logan	Won	
British Academy Film Awards	10 February 2013	Best Actor in a Supporting Role	Javier Bardem	Nominated	
British Academy Film Awards	10 February 2013	Best Actress in a Supporting Role	Judi Dench	Nominated	
British Academy Film Awards	10 February 2013	Best Cinematography	Roger Deakins	Nominated	
British Academy Film Awards	10 February 2013	Best Editing	Stuart Baird	Nominated	
British Academy Film Awards	10 February 2013	Best Production Design	Dennis Gassner and Anna Pinnock	Nominated	
British Academy Film Awards	10 February 2013	Best Film Music	Thomas Newman	Won	
British Academy Film Awards	10 February 2013	Best Sound	Stuart Wilson, Scott Millan, Greg P. Russell, Per Hallberg, Karen Baker Landers	Nominated	
Chicago Film Critics Association Awards	17 December 2012	Best Supporting Actress	Judi Dench	Nominated	
Chicago Film Critics Association Awards	17 December 2012	Best Cinematography	Roger Deakins	Nominated	
Chicago Film Critics Association Awards	17 December 2012	Best Editing	Stuart Baird	Nominated	
Cinema Audio Society Awards	17 February 2013	Outstanding Achievement in Sound Mixing for a Motion Picture – Live Action	Stuart Baird, Scott Millan, Greg P. Russell, Simon Rhodes, Peter Gleaves, James Ashwill	Nominated	
Costume Designers Guild Awards	19 February 2013	Excellence in Contemporary Film	Jany Temime	Won	
Critics' Choice Movie Awards	10 January 2013	Best Supporting Actor	Javier Bardem	Nominated	
Critics' Choice Movie Awards	10 January 2013	Best Supporting Actress	Judi Dench	Nominated	
Critics' Choice Movie Awards	10 January 2013	Best Cinematography	Roger Deakins	Nominated	
Critics' Choice Movie Awards	10 January 2013	Best Song	Adele and Paul Epworth for "Skyfall"	Won	
Critics' Choice Movie Awards	10 January 2013	Best Action Movie	Skyfall	Won	
Critics' Choice Movie Awards	10 January 2013	Best Actor in an Action Movie	Daniel Craig	Won	
Critics' Choice Movie Awards	10 January 2013	Best Actress in an Action Movie	Judi Dench	Nominated	
Dallas–Fort Worth Film Critics Association Awards	18 December 2012	Best Film	Skyfall	Nominated	
Dallas–Fort Worth Film Critics Association Awards	18 December 2012	Best Cinematography	Roger Deakins	Nominated	
Empire Awards	24 March 2013	Best Film	Skyfall	Won	
Empire Awards	24 March 2013	Best British Film	Skyfall	Nominated	
Empire Awards	24 March 2013	Best Director	Sam Mendes	Won	
Empire Awards	24 March 2013	Best Actor	Daniel Craig	Nominated	
Empire Awards	24 March 2013	Best Actress	Judi Dench	Nominated	
Empire Awards	24 March 2013	Best Thriller	Skyfall	Nominated	
Evening Standard British Film Awards	4 February 2013	Best Film	Skyfall	Won	
Evening Standard British Film Awards	4 February 2013	Blockbuster of the Year	Skyfall	Won	
Florida Film Critics Circle Awards	18 December 2012	Best Cinematography	Roger Deakins	Won	
Golden Globe Awards	13 January 2013	Best Original Song	Adele and Paul Epworth for "Skyfall"	Won	
Golden Reel Awards	17 February 2013	Outstanding Achievement in Sound Editing – Dialogue and ADR for Feature Film	Skyfall	Nominated	
Golden Reel Awards	17 February 2013	Outstanding Achievement in Sound Editing – Sound Effects and Foley for Feature Film	Skyfall	Won	
Golden Reel Awards	17 February 2013	Outstanding Achievement in Sound Editing – Feature Underscore	Skyfall	Nominated	
Golden Trailer Awards	3 May 2013	Best Action	"Domestic" (Picture Production Company)	Won	
Golden Trailer Awards	3 May 2013	Best Thriller	"Domestic" (Picture Production Company)	Nominated	
Golden Trailer Awards	3 May 2013	Best Original Score	"Teaser Trailer" (Picture Production Company)	Won	
Golden Trailer Awards	3 May 2013	Most Action TV Spot	"Bond is Back – Men" (Create Advertising Group)	Nominated	
Golden Trailer Awards	3 May 2013	Best Music TV Spot	"Adele" (Create Advertising Group)	Nominated	
Golden Trailer Awards	3 May 2013	Best International Poster	Skyfall (Empire Design)	Won	
Grammy Awards	26 January 2014	Best Score Soundtrack for Visual Media	Thomas Newman for Skyfall	Won	
Grammy Awards	26 January 2014	Best Song Written for Visual Media	Adele for "Skyfall"	Won	
Houston Film Critics Society Awards	5 January 2013	Best Supporting Actor	Javier Bardem	Nominated	
Houston Film Critics Society Awards	5 January 2013	Best Supporting Actress	Judi Dench	Nominated	
Houston Film Critics Society Awards	5 January 2013	Best Cinematography	Roger Deakins	Won	
Houston Film Critics Society Awards	5 January 2013	Best Original Score	Thomas Newman	Nominated	
Houston Film Critics Society Awards	5 January 2013	Best Original Song	Adele and Paul Epworth for "Skyfall"	Won	
ICG Publicists Awards	22 February 2013	Maxwell Weinberg Publicists Showmanship Motion Picture Award	Skyfall	Nominated	
International Cinephile Society Awards	11 January 2013	Best Cinematography	Roger Deakins	Nominated	
International Film Music Critics Association Awards	21 February 2013	Best Original Score for an Action/Adventure/Thriller Film	Thomas Newman	Won	
Japan Academy Film Prize	8 March 2013	Outstanding Foreign Language Film	Skyfall	Nominated	
London Film Critics' Circle Awards	20 January 2013	Supporting Actor of the Year	Javier Bardem	Nominated	
London Film Critics' Circle Awards	20 January 2013	Supporting Actress of the Year	Judi Dench	Nominated	
London Film Critics' Circle Awards	20 January 2013	British Film of the Year	Skyfall	Nominated	
London Film Critics' Circle Awards	20 January 2013	British Actor of the Year	Daniel Craig	Nominated	
London Film Critics' Circle Awards	20 January 2013	British Actress of the Year	Judi Dench	Nominated	
Los Angeles Film Critics Association Awards	9 December 2012	Best Cinematography	Roger Deakins	Won	
Movieguide Awards	15 February 2013	Best Movie for Mature Audiences	Skyfall	Nominated	
MTV Movie Awards	14 April 2013	Best Villain	Javier Bardem	Nominated	
MTV Movie Awards	14 April 2013	Best Shirtless Performance	Daniel Craig	Nominated	
MTV Movie Awards	14 April 2013	Best Fight	Daniel Craig vs. Ola Rapace	Nominated	
MTV Movie Awards	14 April 2013	Best Gut-Wrenching Performance	Javier Bardem	Nominated	
National Society of Film Critics Awards	5 January 2013	Best Cinematography	Roger Deakins	2nd place	
NME Awards	27 February 2013	Best Film	Skyfall	Nominated	
Online Film Critics Society Awards	31 December 2012	Best Cinematography	Roger Deakins	Won	
Online Film Critics Society Awards	31 December 2012	Best Editing	Stuart Baird	Nominated	
Producers Guild of America Awards	26 January 2013	Best Theatrical Motion Picture	Barbara Broccoli and Michael G. Wilson	Nominated	
Satellite Awards	16 December 2012	Best Film	Skyfall	Nominated	
Satellite Awards	16 December 2012	Best Supporting Actor	Javier Bardem	Won	
Satellite Awards	16 December 2012	Best Supporting Actress	Judi Dench	Nominated	
Satellite Awards	16 December 2012	Best Cinematography	Roger Deakins	Nominated	
Satellite Awards	16 December 2012	Best Original Score	Thomas Newman	Nominated	
Satellite Awards	16 December 2012	Best Original Song	Adele and Paul Epworth for "Skyfall"	Nominated	
Satellite Awards	16 December 2012	Best Visual Effects	Steve Begg, Arundi Asregadoo, and Andrew Whitehurst	Nominated	
Saturn Awards	26 June 2013	Best Action or Adventure Film	Skyfall	Won	
Saturn Awards	26 June 2013	Best Actor	Daniel Craig	Nominated	
Saturn Awards	26 June 2013	Best Supporting Actor	Javier Bardem	Nominated	
Saturn Awards	26 June 2013	Best Supporting Actress	Judi Dench	Nominated	
Saturn Awards	26 June 2013	Best Editing	Stuart Baird and Kate Baird	Nominated	
Saturn Awards	26 June 2013	Best Music	Thomas Newman	Nominated	
Saturn Awards	26 June 2013	Best Make-up	Naomi Donne, Donald Mowat, and Love Larson	Nominated	
Screen Actors Guild Awards	27 January 2013	Outstanding Performance by a Male Actor in a Supporting Role	Javier Bardem	Nominated	
Screen Actors Guild Awards	27 January 2013	Outstanding Performance by a Stunt Ensemble in a Motion Picture	Skyfall	Won	
Screen Nation Film and Television Awards	23 February 2014	Female Performance in Film	Naomie Harris (Note: Also for Mandela: Long Walk to Freedom (2013))	Won	
St. Louis Film Critics Association Awards	11 December 2012	Best Cinematography	Roger Deakins	Won	
Teen Choice Awards	11 August 2013	Choice Movie: Action	Skyfall	Nominated	
Teen Choice Awards	11 August 2013	Choice Movie Actor: Action	Daniel Craig	Nominated	
Teen Choice Awards	11 August 2013	Choice Movie: Villain	Javier Bardem	Nominated	
Washington D.C. Area Film Critics Association Awards	10 December 2012	Best Supporting Actor	Javier Bardem	Nominated	
Washington D.C. Area Film Critics Association Awards	10 December 2012	Best Cinematography	Roger Deakins	Nominated	
World Soundtrack Awards	19 October 2013	Soundtrack Composer of the Year	Thomas Newman	Nominated	
World Soundtrack Awards	19 October 2013	Best Original Score of the Year	Thomas Newman	Nominated	
World Soundtrack Awards	19 October 2013	Best Original Song Written Directly for a Film	Adele and Paul Epworth for "Skyfall"	Won	

== See also ==
- List of accolades received by No Time to Die
