= No Time to Die =

2021 James Bond film by Cary Joji Fukunaga

- British theatrical release poster
- Directed by: Cary Joji Fukunaga
- Screenplay by: Neal Purvis Robert Wade; Cary Joji Fukunaga; Phoebe Waller-Bridge
- Story by: Neal Purvis; Robert Wade; Cary Joji Fukunaga
- Based on: James Bond by Ian Fleming
- Produced by: Michael G. Wilson; Barbara Broccoli
- Starring: Daniel Craig; Rami Malek; Léa Seydoux; Lashana Lynch; Ben Whishaw; Naomie Harris; Jeffrey Wright; Christoph Waltz; Ralph Fiennes
- Cinematography: Linus Sandgren
- Edited by: Elliot Graham; Tom Cross
- Music by: Hans Zimmer
- Production companies: Metro-Goldwyn-Mayer Pictures; Eon Productions
- Distributed by: United Artists Releasing (United States); Universal Pictures (United Kingdom and Ireland)
- Release dates: 28 September 2021 (Royal Albert Hall); 30 September 2021 (United Kingdom); 8 October 2021 (United States)
- Running time: 163 minutes
- Countries: United Kingdom; United States
- Language: English
- Budget: $250–301 million
- Box office: $774.2 million

No Time to Die is a 2021 spy thriller film and the twenty-fifth film in the James Bond series produced by Eon Productions. The sequel to Spectre (2015), it is the fifth and final film to star Daniel Craig as the fictional British MI6 agent James Bond. In the film, Bond has retired from active service in MI6 and is recruited by the CIA to extract a kidnapped scientist carrying deadly DNA-targeting nanobots, leading him to uncover a plot by the bioterrorist Lyutsifer Safin to kill millions of people. The film was directed by Cary Joji Fukunaga from a screenplay he co-wrote with Neal Purvis and Robert Wade and Phoebe Waller-Bridge, based on a story conceived by Purvis, Wade, and Fukunaga. In addition to Craig, Léa Seydoux, Ben Whishaw, Naomie Harris, Jeffrey Wright, Christoph Waltz, Ralph Fiennes, and Rory Kinnear reprise their roles from previous films, with Rami Malek, Lashana Lynch, Billy Magnussen, Ana de Armas, David Dencik, and Dali Benssalah appearing in new roles.

Development on the film began in 2016. Danny Boyle was originally attached to direct and co-write the screenplay with John Hodge. Both left in August 2018 due to creative differences, and Fukunaga was announced as Boyle's replacement a month later. Most of the cast had signed on by April 2019, and principal photography took place from April to October 2019. No Time to Die is the only James Bond film starring Daniel Craig that was not co-produced by Columbia Pictures, due to the expiration of a deal between Metro-Goldwyn-Mayer and Sony. It is also the only James Bond film to be distributed by United Artists Releasing, a joint venture between MGM and Annapurna Pictures, as well as the last film in the franchise to be released by MGM before the studio's acquisition by Amazon in 2022. Billie Eilish performed the theme song, "No Time to Die", and Hans Zimmer composed the score, with Steve Mazzaro serving as the score producer.

After being delayed by Boyle's departure and later by the COVID-19 pandemic, No Time to Die premiered at the Royal Albert Hall in London on 28 September 2021, and was released in the United Kingdom on 30 September and in the United States on 8 October. The film received generally positive reviews from critics. It grossed over $774.2 million worldwide, becoming the fourth-highest-grossing film of 2021, the third-highest-grossing Bond film, and the third-highest-grossing film (and third-highest Bond film) of all time in the UK. No Time to Die was nominated for three awards at the 94th Academy Awards, winning Best Original Song, and received numerous other accolades.

On 20 February 2025, Amazon MGM Studios announced that it had gained full creative control of the James Bond franchise from Danjaq and Eon Productions, making this the final film in the series to be produced under the stewardship of Albert R. Broccoli, Michael G. Wilson, or Barbara Broccoli. The next film will be co-produced by Amy Pascal and David Heyman, directed by Denis Villeneuve, with Robert Pattinson set to succeed Craig as Bond.

== Plot ==
A young Madeleine Swann witnesses her mother's murder by Lyutsifer Safin, whose family was murdered by Madeleine's father, Mr. White, under orders from Ernst Stavro Blofeld. After wounding Safin, Madeleine falls into a frozen lake, but Safin rescues her.

In the present day, following the capture of Blofeld, (Note: As depicted in Spectre (2015).) Madeleine travels to Gravina in Puglia with James Bond and persuades him to visit his ex-lover Vesper Lynd's (Note: As depicted in Casino Royale (2006).) grave to help Bond get over her. When Bond visits the tomb, it explodes, and he is attacked by SPECTRE operatives led by Primo, a mercenary with a bionic eye. While fleeing with Bond, Madeleine receives a congratulatory phone call from Blofeld. Bond accuses Madeleine of betraying him and sends her away, saying they will never meet again.

Five years later, SPECTRE agents infiltrate an MI6 laboratory and kidnap the scientist Valdo Obruchev, who secretly works for Safin. They steal Project Heracles, a programmable DNA-targeting nanobot bioweapon developed under M. Now living in Jamaica, Bond is asked by his CIA ally Felix Leiter to extract Obruchev from a SPECTRE party in Cuba. Nomi, Bond's successor as Agent 007, warns him not to interfere with her own extraction of Obruchev. She puts him in contact with M, who refuses to explain Heracles, and soon after, Bond accepts Felix's offer. Bond infiltrates the party with Leiter's Cuban agent, Paloma. Blofeld, overseeing the party from Belmarsh prison through his own bionic eye, deploys a nanobot mist to kill Bond, but the mist kills the SPECTRE members because Obruchev had secretly reprogrammed the nanobots to target them. Bond takes Obruchev aboard a trawler, where Leiter and his associate Logan Ash are waiting. As Bond questions Obruchev about Heracles and Blofeld, Obruchev looks to Ash, exposing him as a co-conspirator. Ash shoots Leiter and traps him with Bond below deck, then triggers explosives to sink the ship as he flees with Obruchev. Bond escapes, but Leiter dies.

Bond seeks to interrogate Blofeld but learns he will only speak to Madeleine, his psychiatrist. Safin coerces Madeleine into infecting herself with a nanobot dose to assassinate Blofeld. MI6 allows Bond to visit Belmarsh with Madeleine, but she is too distressed to face Blofeld. Bond touches Madeleine before she leaves, unknowingly infecting himself with the nanobots. During the interrogation, Blofeld reveals to Bond that he planned the ambush at Vesper's grave to make Bond believe that Madeleine betrayed him. Enraged, Bond briefly strangles Blofeld, who dies shortly afterward from exposure to the nanobots in Bond's bloodstream. Bond reconciles with Madeleine at her childhood home in Norway and meets her young daughter, Mathilde, who Madeleine insists is not Bond's child, despite their resemblance. After Madeleine shares intelligence that her father gathered about Safin and his family's island, Bond realizes that Ash is approaching the house. Ash and his thugs pursue Bond, Mathilde, and Madeleine into a forest, and Bond orders Madeleine and Mathilde to hide. Bond kills Ash and his men, but Safin kidnaps Madeleine and Mathilde.

Q provides Bond and Nomi with a submersible glider to infiltrate Safin's nanobot factory headquarters, from which Safin and Obruchev plan to distribute the nanobots worldwide, potentially killing millions and establishing a new world order. Bond confronts Safin and kills his bodyguards, and Safin flees with Mathilde. Madeleine escapes from Primo and reunites with Bond. The pair finds Mathilde, whom Safin abandoned. Nomi kills Obruchev and escorts Madeleine and Mathilde off the island. Bond convinces M to authorise a missile strike on the island, then kills Primo and Safin's remaining men. Safin reappears, shoots Bond repeatedly, and infects him and himself by breaking a vial containing nanobots programmed to kill Madeleine and Mathilde. Bond shoots Safin dead and opens the facility's blast doors to allow the missiles to penetrate it. Seriously wounded and knowing he can never touch Madeleine or Mathilde, Bond radios Madeleine to say goodbye and express his love for her and Mathilde. Madeleine confirms that Mathilde is his daughter, and Bond assures her that he knew all along. Bond is then killed as the missiles destroy the facility. At MI6, M, Moneypenny, Nomi, Q, and Bill Tanner drink to Bond's memory. Driving Mathilde to Gravina, Madeleine begins to tell her about her father, James Bond.

== Cast ==
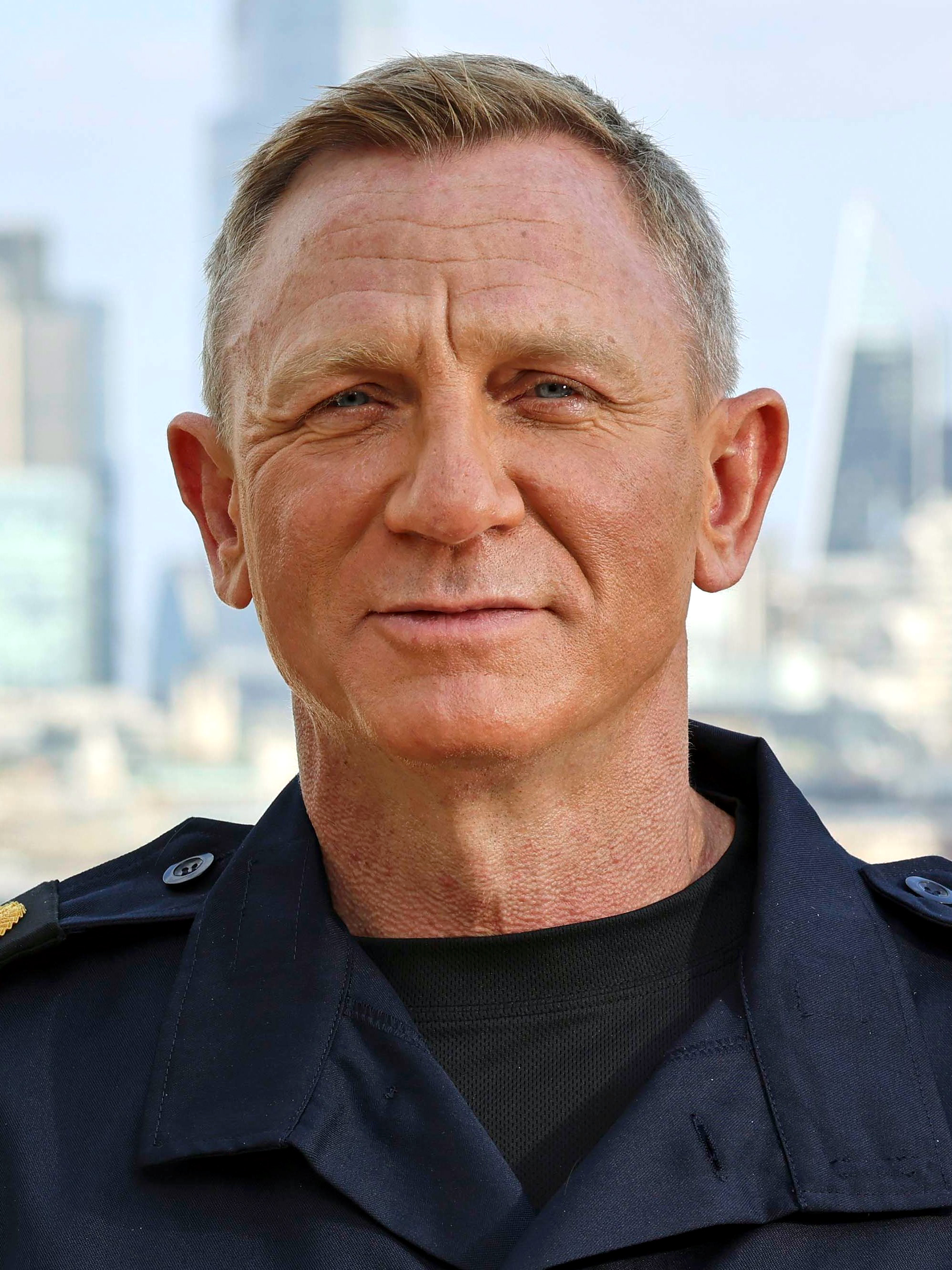
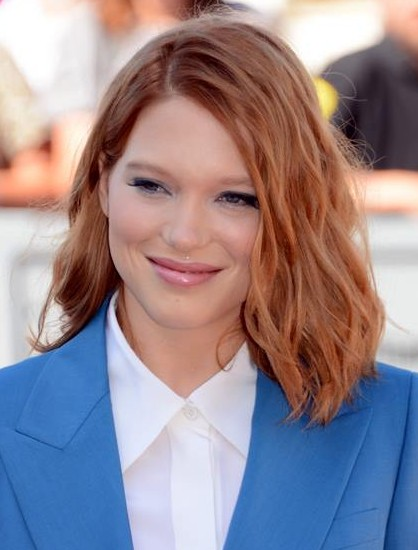
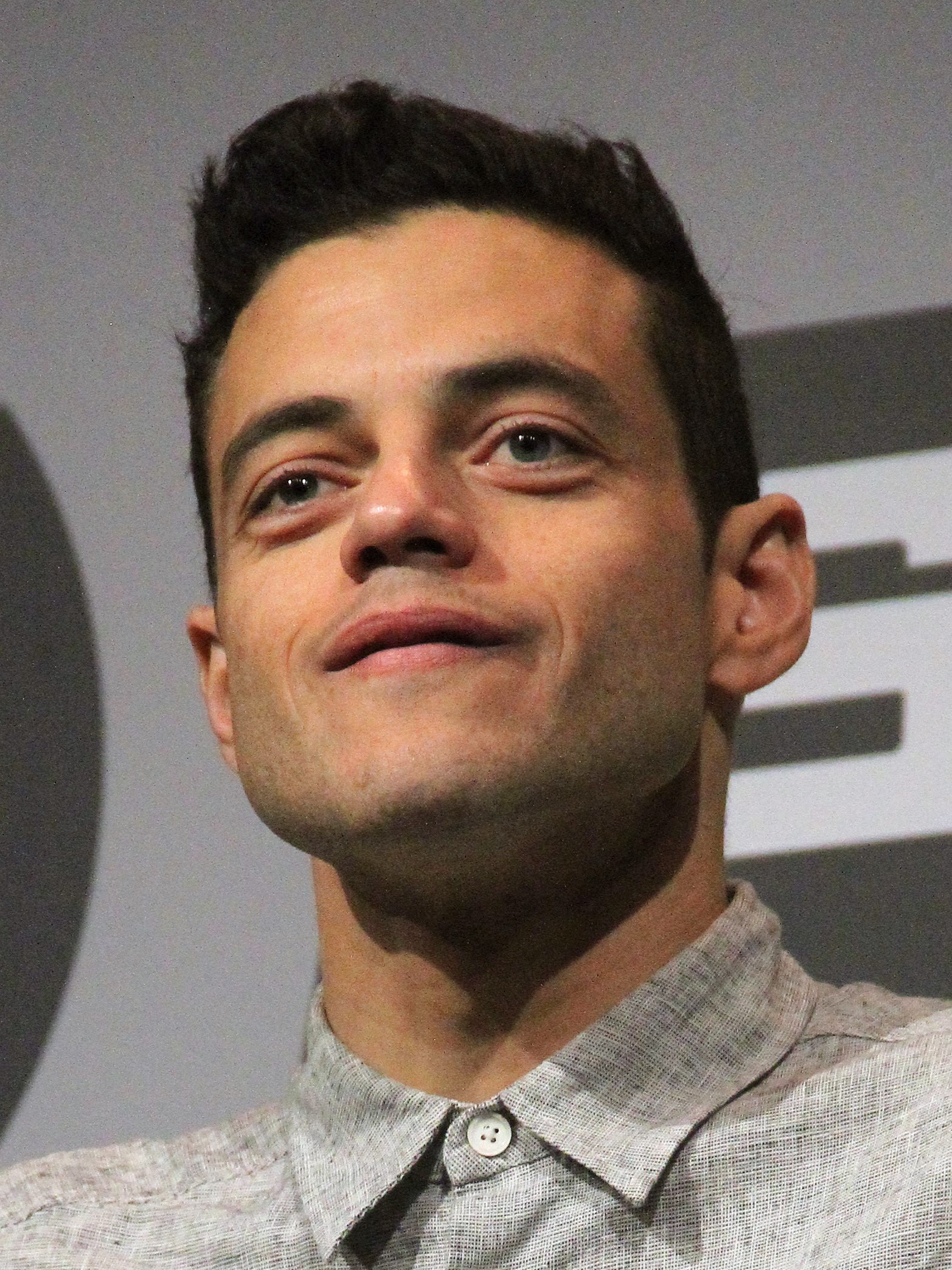
Daniel Craig (left) in 2021, Léa Seydoux (in 2014) and Rami Malek (in 2016)
- Daniel Craig as James Bond: Former MI6 agent 007, retired for five years. Director Cary Joji Fukunaga compared Bond to a "wounded animal" and described his state of mind as "struggling to deal with his role as a '00 agent'. The world's changed. The rules of engagement aren't what they used to be. The rules of espionage are darker in this era of asymmetric warfare". Craig stated that the film is "about relationships and family".
- Léa Seydoux as Dr. Madeleine Swann: Psychotherapist daughter of Mr. White, and Bond's love interest who assisted him in the film Spectre. Fukunaga underscored Madeleine's importance in exploring Bond's unresolved trauma from the death of Vesper Lynd in Casino Royale. Seydoux said: "There's a lot of emotion in this Bond. It's very moving. I bet you're going to cry. When I watched it, I cried, which is weird because I am in it."
- Rami Malek as Lyutsifer Safin: Bioterrorist and scientist on a revenge mission against SPECTRE who becomes Bond's adversary. Producer Barbara Broccoli described the character as "the one that really gets under Bond's skin. He's a nasty piece of work". Malek said Safin considers himself "a hero almost in the same way that Bond is a hero", while Fukunaga described him as "more dangerous than anyone [Bond has] ever encountered", a "hyper-intelligent and worthy adversary".
- Lashana Lynch as Nomi: A new agent, assigned the 007 number. Lynch hoped that her character would bring a new layer of relatability to the world of espionage, saying "When you're dealing with a franchise that has been slick for so many years, I wanted to throw a human spin on it—to deal with anxiety and be someone who's figuring it out, completely on her toes".
- Ralph Fiennes as Gareth Mallory / M: Head of MI6 and Bond's superior officer.
- Ben Whishaw as Q: MI6's Quartermaster who outfits "00" agents with field equipment. Q is revealed to be gay. Whishaw said: "I think I'm done now. I've done the three that I was contracted to do. So I think that might be it for me."
- Naomie Harris as Eve Moneypenny: M's secretary and Bond's ally. Harris says since Spectre, "Moneypenny has grown up somewhat. I think she still has her soft spot for Bond though, that's never going to go. But she's an independent woman with her own life".
- Jeffrey Wright as Felix Leiter: Bond's friend and a CIA field officer. While Wright was surprised not to be asked to return in Skyfall and Spectre, he felt Felix's return in No Time to Die is given "more weight" by his prior absence. He said the film establishes the core brotherhood of Bond and Felix's relationship.
- Billy Magnussen as Logan Ash: a State Department agent assigned by Leiter to support Bond in finding Obruchev.
- Ana de Armas as Paloma: A CIA agent. De Armas described her character as "irresponsible" and "bubbly," and playing a key role in Bond's mission.
- Christoph Waltz as Ernst Stavro Blofeld: Bond's arch-enemy and foster brother, founder and head of the criminal syndicate SPECTRE, and now in MI6 custody. Fukunaga said: "Blofeld is an iconic character in all the Bond films. He's in prison, but he certainly can't be done yet, right? So what could he be doing from in there and what nefarious, sadistic things does he have planned for James Bond and the rest of the world?"
- David Dencik as Dr. Valdo Obruchev: a corrupt scientist and creator of Project Heracles.
- Rory Kinnear as Bill Tanner: M's chief of staff
- Dali Benssalah as Primo: a mercenary
- Lisa-Dorah Sonnet as Mathilde: The five-year-old daughter of James Bond and Madeleine Swann

Hugh Dennis and Priyanga Burford portray scientists working at an MI6 laboratory. Mathilde Bourbin and Coline Defaud appear as Madeleine Swann's mother and young Madeleine, respectively, in the opening sequence. Brigitte Millar reprises her role as SPECTRE chief Dr. Vogel from Spectre. The veteran British civil servant Hayden Phillips makes a cameo appearance in the film as the antagonist Sir Sebastian d'Ath.

== Production ==
=== Development ===
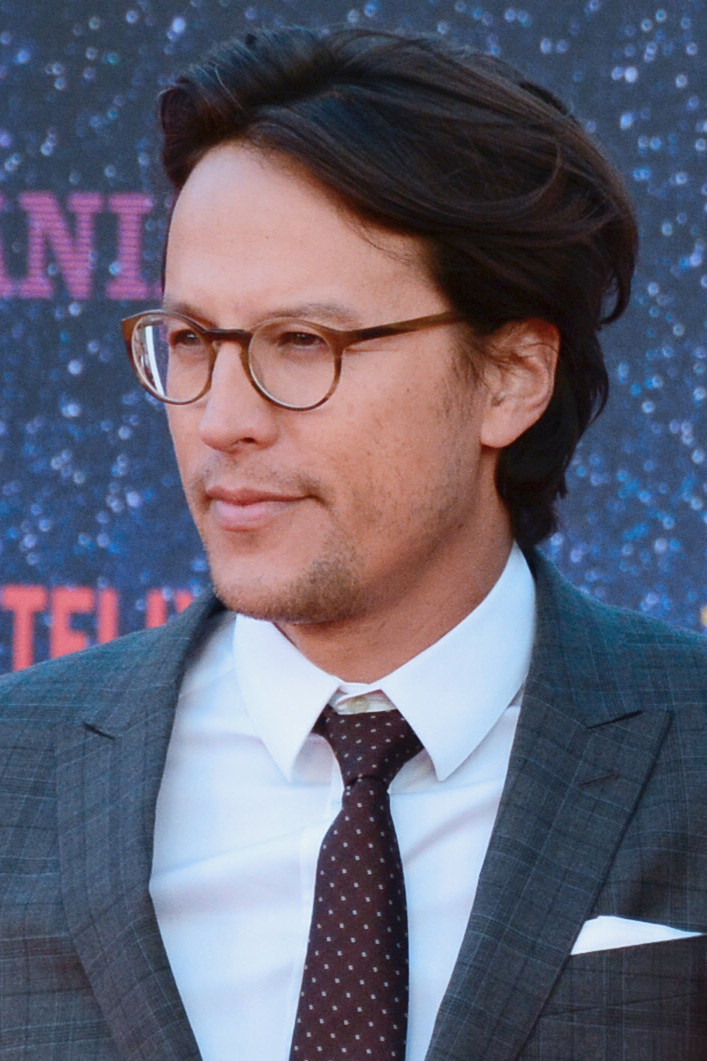
Cary Joji Fukunaga, director of No Time to Die

Development of No Time to Die began in February 2016. In March 2017, screenwriters Neal Purvis and Robert Wade—who have worked on every Bond film since The World Is Not Enough (1999)—were approached to write the script by producers Barbara Broccoli and Michael G. Wilson. Purvis and Wade mapped out the story for the film in 2017. Sam Mendes stated that he would not return after directing Skyfall and Spectre. Christopher Nolan ruled himself out to direct. By July 2017, Yann Demange, David Mackenzie and Denis Villeneuve (who was later announced as the director of the upcoming 26th Bond film in June 2025) were courted to direct. In December 2017, Villeneuve decided against the role due to his commitments to the first Dune film from 2021.

In February 2018, Danny Boyle was established as a frontrunner for the directing position. Boyle's original pitch to Broccoli and Wilson saw John Hodge writing a screenplay based on Boyle's idea with Purvis and Wade's version scrapped. Hodge's draft was greenlit, and Boyle was confirmed to direct with a production start date of December 2018. However, Boyle and Hodge left in August 2018 due to creative differences. It was reported at the time that Boyle's exit was due to the casting of Tomasz Kot as the lead villain; however, Boyle later confirmed the dispute was over the script. The release date became contingent on whether the studio could find a replacement for Boyle within sixty days. Cary Joji Fukunaga was announced as the new director in September 2018. Fukunaga became the first American to direct an Eon Productions Bond film and the first director to receive a writing credit for any version. (Note: The American directors John Huston and Robert Parrish were two of five directors who worked on the 1967 adaptation of Casino Royale, and Irvin Kershner directed the 1983 film Never Say Never Again. Neither film was produced by Eon Productions.) Fukunaga had been considered for Spectre before Mendes was hired, and afterwards had expressed an interest to Broccoli and Wilson about directing a future Bond film. Linus Sandgren was hired as cinematographer in December 2018.

Purvis and Wade were brought back to start working on a new script with Fukunaga in September 2018. Casino Royale and Quantum of Solace screenwriter Paul Haggis turned in an uncredited rewrite in November 2018, with Scott Z. Burns doing the same in February 2019. At Daniel Craig's request, Phoebe Waller-Bridge provided a script polish in April 2019. Waller-Bridge is the second female screenwriter credited with writing a Bond film after Johanna Harwood co-wrote Dr. No and From Russia with Love. (Note: Harwood also provided uncredited contributions to the script for Goldfinger. Dana Stevens contributed to the script of The World Is Not Enough, but was never formally credited for her work.) Barbara Broccoli was questioned about the MeToo movement at the Bond 25 launch event, where she stated that Bond's attitude towards women would move with the times and the films should reflect that. In a separate interview, Waller-Bridge argued that Bond was still relevant and that "he needs to be true to this character", instead suggesting that it was the films which had to grow and evolve, emphasising "the important thing is that the film treats the women properly".

Some concepts changed during development with Fukunaga. An early unrealised idea he considered was to have seen the film take place "inside Bond's head", while being tortured by Blofeld in Spectre, up until the end of act two of a three-act structure. Originally, Safin, the villain, and his henchman would wear masks based on Siberian bear-hunting armour. The henchman character was written out before filming, and Fukunaga requested changes to Safin's costume. A new mask based on Noh, a Japanese style of theatre, was introduced as Fukunaga felt that the original mask was dominating the costume.

Paloma's costume, a navy Michael Lo Sordo gown, was chosen by costume designer Suttirat Anne Larlarb to enable the character to fight alongside Bond while still being dressed elegantly and formally for the black tie event in the plot.

The film entered production under the working title of Bond 25. The title No Time to Die was announced on 20 August 2019. (Note: No Time to Die shares its title with a 1958 film directed by Terence Young, produced by Albert R. "Cubby" Broccoli and written by Richard Maibaum, respectively the original director, producer and writer of Dr. No, From Russia with Love and Thunderball.) Broccoli said: "We were struggling to find a title. We wanted a title that wouldn't give away anything but would be understandable, and after you see the movie, have a deeper resonance, because that's often what Fleming titles are all about."

=== Writing ===
When Boyle was hired, he pitched the film to take place in present-day Russia and explore Bond's origins; he left the production after Broccoli and Wilson "lost confidence" in the idea. During Boyle's time, a leaked casting sheet described the male leading role as a "cold and charismatic Russian" and the female leading role as a "witty and skillful survivor". Production also sought male supporting roles of Māori descent with "advanced combat skills". The idea of Bond having a child was introduced by Hodge and retained for the final script.

Waller-Bridge was hired to revise dialogue, work on character development, and add humour to the script. The character of Paloma was made more significant from originally being a simple contact; Purvis and Wade indicated this was probably written by Waller-Bridge at Fukunaga's request.

No Time to Die is the first Eon-produced film in which Bond is killed. Craig first proposed killing Bond in 2006, after the premiere of Casino Royale; Broccoli agreed to the suggestion. Craig said, "It's the only way I could see for myself to end it all and to make it like that was my tenure, someone else could come and take over ... When he [Craig's Bond] goes, he can't come back." Wilson said it was "the fitting way to deal with a situation where a person is risking their life all the time. Eventually, the odds catch up with you." The production team considered several ways for Bond to die, including being shot by an anonymous shooter. However, Fukunaga said that a "conventional weapons death" felt inappropriate considering that Bond had been able to "escape from everything else". Craig said the team tried to create a sense of tragedy and weight by using Safin's bioweapon, which killed "the only thing that Bond wants in life ... to be with the people he loves". In a November 2024 interview, Craig reiterated that this was his final Bond film, saying, "He's dead! How many times do I have to blow him up? He's in teeny-weeny little pieces ... He’s full of a virus that would kill his family, so there’s no way he can come back".

=== Casting ===
After Spectre, there was speculation that it would be Craig's final Bond film. Immediately after the film's release, Craig had complained about the rigours of performing the part, saying he would rather "slash [his] wrists" than play Bond again. In May 2016, it was reported that Craig had received a $100 million offer from Metro-Goldwyn-Mayer (MGM) to do two more Bond films, but turned it down. In October 2016, Craig denied having made a decision but praised his time in the role, describing it as "the best job in the world doing Bond". He further denied that $150 million was offered to him for the next two instalments. Eventually, Craig was paid $25 million for his involvement. In August 2017, on The Late Show with Stephen Colbert, Craig said that the next film would mark his final appearance as Bond. His position was reaffirmed between November 2019 and March 2020. Craig later acknowledged that the physicality of the part had deterred him from returning, as he had sustained injuries when making earlier Bond films. With Craig's departure, Broccoli said that No Time to Die would "tie up loose narrative threads" from Craig's previous Bond films and "come to an emotionally satisfying conclusion".

In December 2018, Fukunaga said that Ben Whishaw, Naomie Harris and Ralph Fiennes would all be reprising their roles in the film. Fukunaga also said that Léa Seydoux would be reprising her role as Madeleine Swann, making her the first female lead to appear in successive Bond films. Rory Kinnear returns as Bill Tanner, as does Jeffrey Wright as Felix Leiter. Wright makes his third appearance in the series after Casino Royale and Quantum of Solace and becomes the first actor to play Leiter three times. Ana de Armas, Dali Benssalah, David Dencik, Lashana Lynch, Billy Magnussen and Rami Malek were announced as cast members in a live stream, at Ian Fleming's Goldeneye estate in Jamaica. The event was on 25 April 2019 and marked the official start of production. The film is the second to unite de Armas with Craig, after Knives Out (filmed in 2018). Malek was further announced as playing Safin, the film's villain, and the actor revealed in an interview that his character would not be connected to any religion or ideology.

After the release of Spectre it was reported that Christoph Waltz had signed on to return as Blofeld for further Bond films, on the condition that Craig returned as Bond. Despite Craig's definite casting as Bond, Waltz announced in October 2017 that he would not return as Blofeld, but did not give a reason for his departure. Waltz's casting as Blofeld in No Time to Die was not announced at the press launch but was revealed in the trailer in December 2019.

=== Filming ===
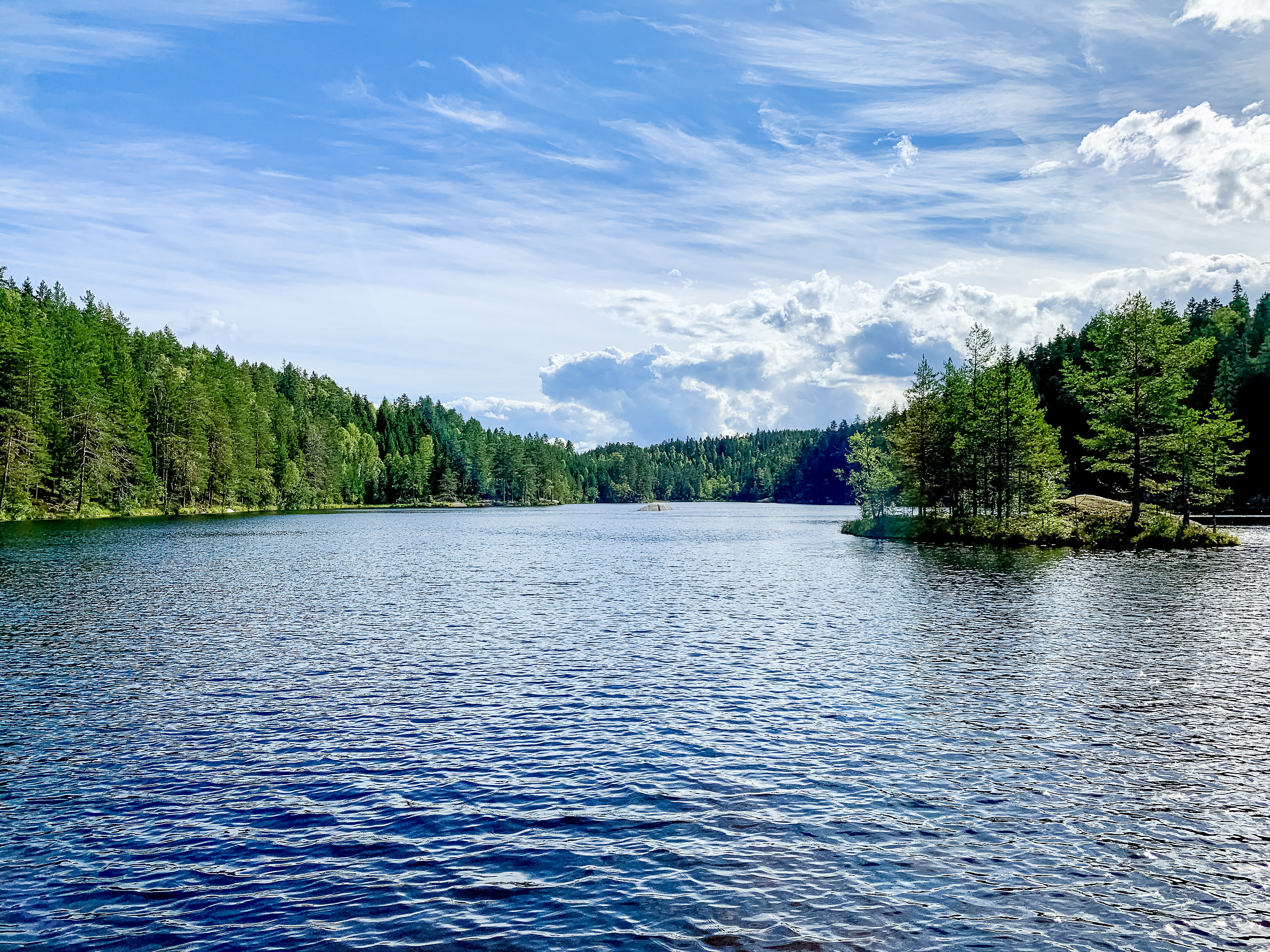
Filming began at Langvann Lake, Norway, the backdrop for Madeleine's childhood home

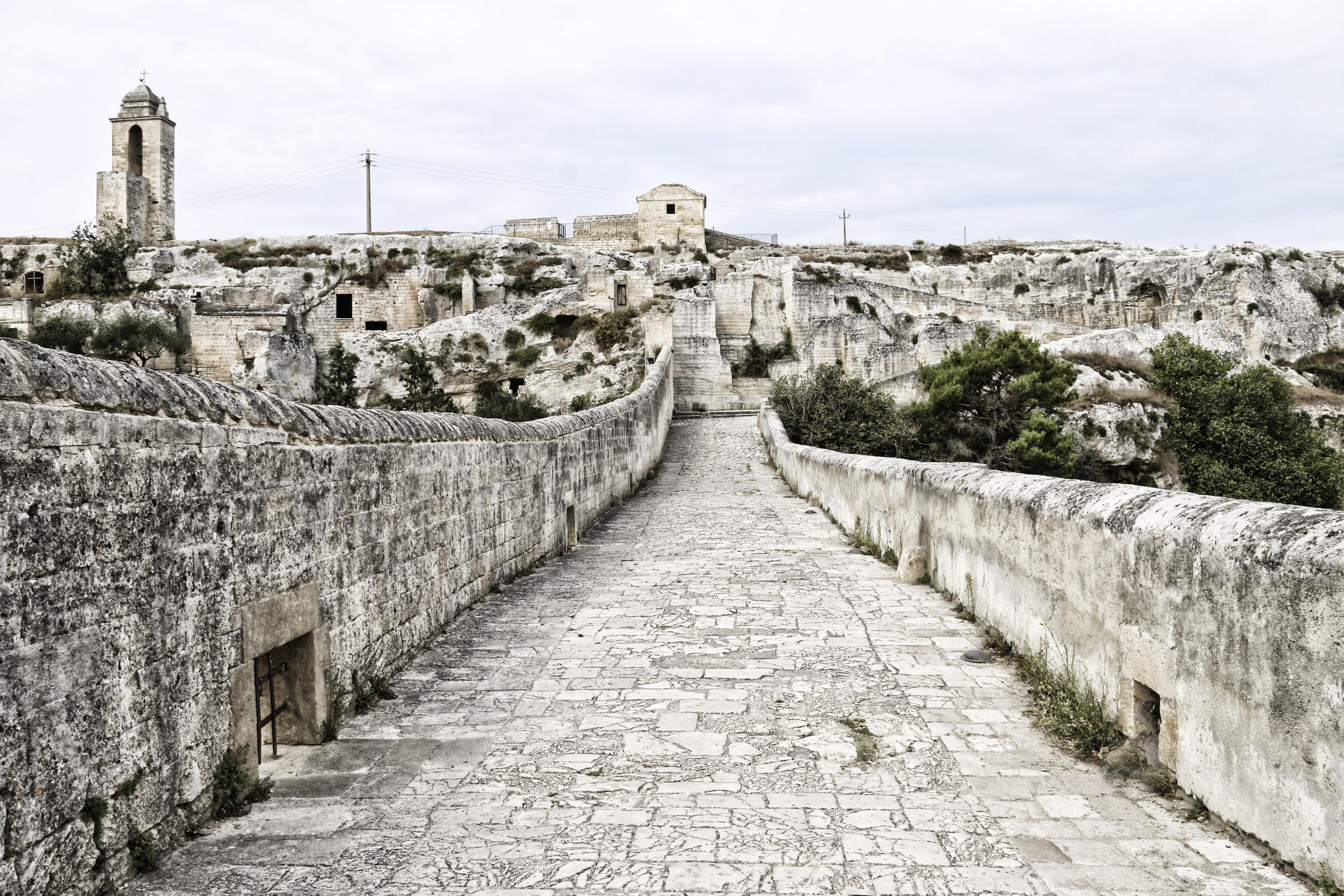
Ponte Viadotto-Acquedotto Madonna della Stella, Gravina di Puglia, used in the bridge stunt

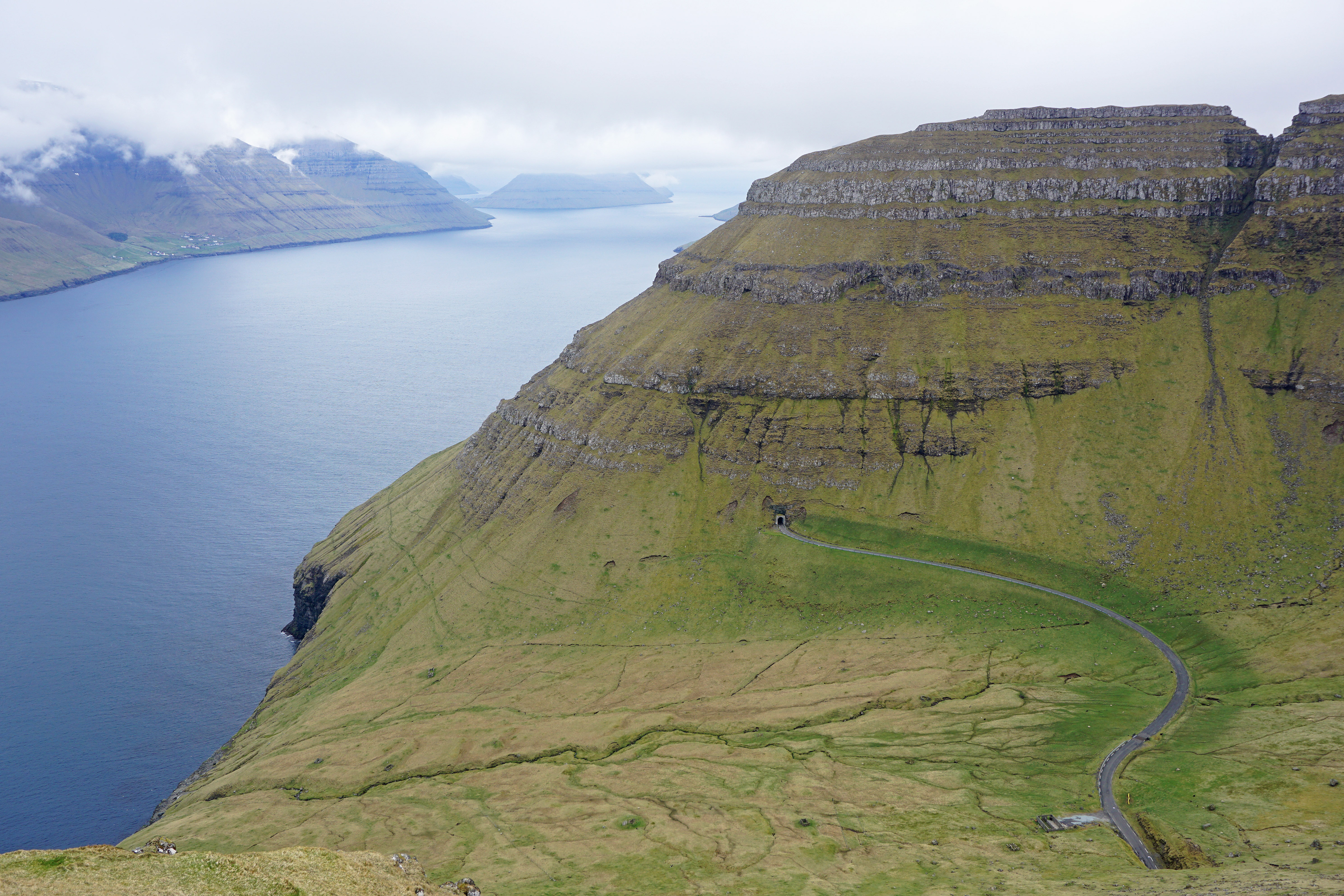
Kalsoy serves as the disputed island that is Safin's base; its sets were inspired by those of Ken Adam and the buildings of Tadao Ando

Production was scheduled to begin on 3 December 2018 at Pinewood Studios, but filming was delayed until April 2019 after Boyle's departure. The film is the first in the series to have sequences shot with 65mm IMAX film cameras. Fukunaga and Sandgren pushed for using film over digital to enhance the look of the film. The budget was reported to be between $250 million and $301 million, while B25 Limited, Eon's subsidiary company created for the film's production, reported a total production cost of £214 million.

Filming locations included Italy, Jamaica, Norway, the Faroe Islands and London, in addition to Pinewood Studios. In March 2019, production started in Nittedal, Norway, with the second unit capturing scenes on a frozen lake. On 28 April 2019, principal photography officially began in Jamaica, including Port Antonio. In May 2019, Craig sustained an ankle injury while filming in Jamaica and subsequently underwent minor surgery. In June 2019, production was further interrupted when a controlled explosion damaged the 007 Stage at Pinewood Studios and left a crew member with minor injuries. Also in June 2019, production went back to Norway to shoot a driving sequence along the Atlantic Ocean Road featuring an Aston Martin V8 Vantage. Aston Martin also confirmed that the DB5, DBS Superleggera, and Valhalla models would feature in the film.

Production then moved to the UK. Scenes featuring Craig, Fiennes, Harris and Kinnear were filmed around London, including Whitehall, Senate House and Hammersmith. In July 2019, filming took place in the town of Aviemore and in the surrounding Cairngorms National Park area. Some scenes were also shot at the Ardverikie House Estate and on the banks of Loch Laggan, just outside the park. The forest scene was filmed in Buttersteep Forest in Windsor Great Park. In late August 2019, the second unit moved to southern Italy where they began to shoot a chase sequence involving an Aston Martin DB5 through the streets of Matera, including a doughnut in Piazza San Giovanni Battista. In early September 2019, the main production unit, Craig and Léa Seydoux arrived to film scenes inside several production-built sets, as well as further sequences in Matera and Gravina in Puglia. Scenes were shot in the town of Sapri in southern Italy throughout September. Locations included the town's "midnight canal" and railway station. The city is referred to as "Civita Lucana" in the film. In late September 2019, scenes were filmed in the Faroe Islands.

The Ministry of Defence confirmed that filming took place around the Royal Navy destroyer HMS Dragon and a Royal Air Force C-17 aircraft, at RAF Brize Norton. (Note: The filming was part of existing commercial relationships across film and television that use British Armed Forces equipment. The details for this particular financial arrangement were not disclosed.) No weapons were fired. The British Army's Household Cavalry unit was also filmed. Filming of an action sequence with a seaplane took place at CMA CGM's Kingston Container Terminal in Jamaica. Whishaw praised Fukunaga's directing work, saying "It was great and you know what was amazing is that he treated it, or was able to approach it, it felt to me almost as if it were an independent film. You know? And it was quite improvisational... we didn't do many takes," he added. "It was very light. Sometimes quite chaotic, but I'm very excited to see how he's constructed the final film". Principal photography wrapped up on 25 October 2019 at Pinewood Studios with the filming of a chase sequence set in Havana, Cuba. Production had intended to shoot the sequence earlier, but was forced to reschedule when Craig injured his ankle in Jamaica. Further pick-up shots at Pinewood were confirmed by Fukunaga on 20 December 2019.

=== Post-production ===
Visual effects for No Time to Die were created by Industrial Light & Magic (ILM), Framestore, DNEG, and Cinesite. Charlie Noble was the visual effects supervisor. Post-production concluded without further changes, as the film's release date was delayed.

=== Music ===
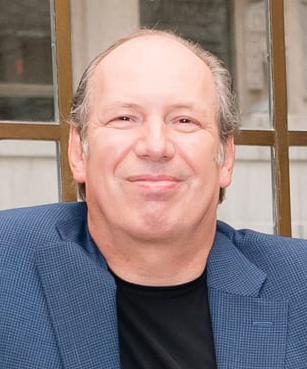
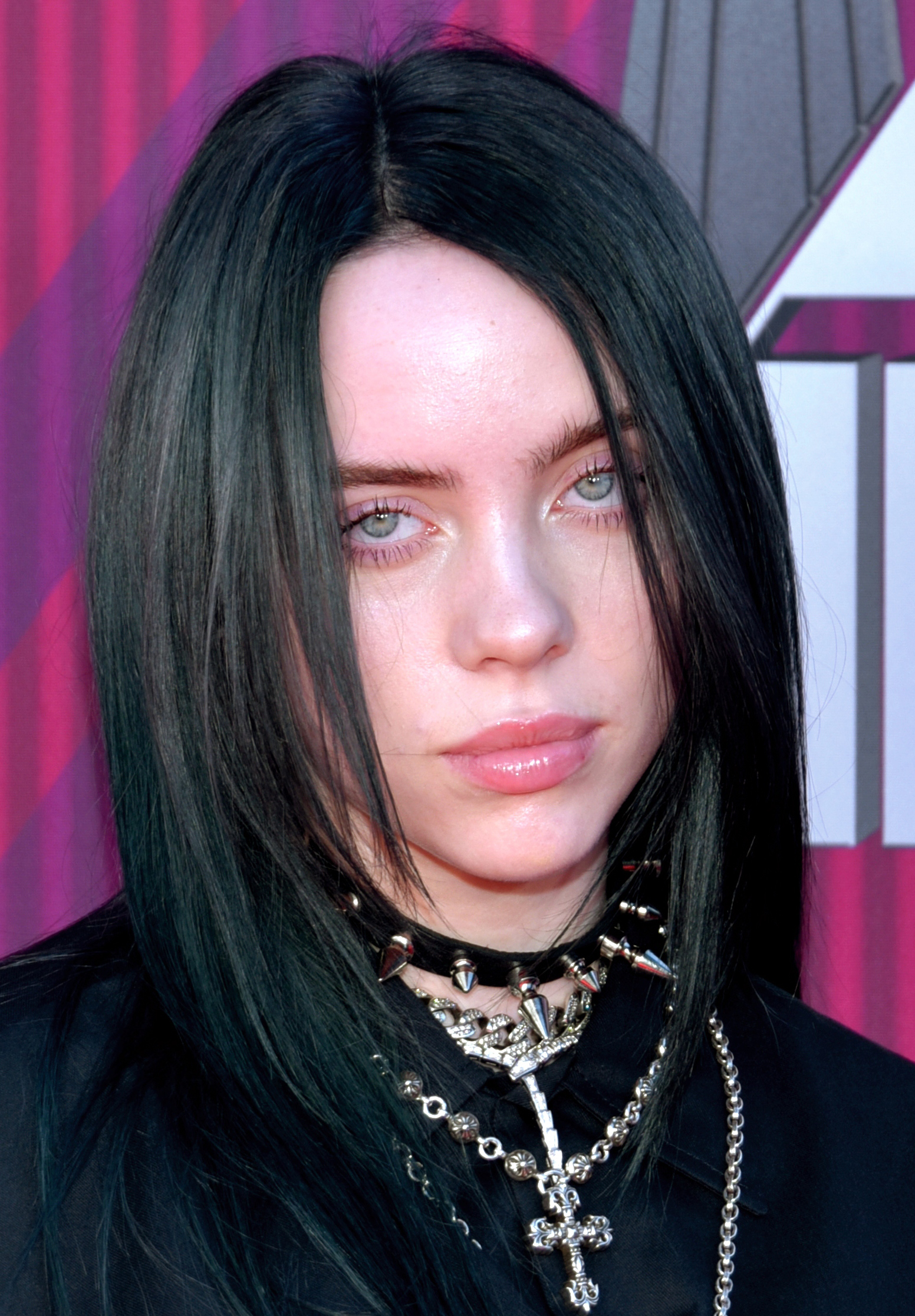
Hans Zimmer (left) composed the film's score and Billie Eilish (right) performed the theme song.

In July 2019, Dan Romer was announced as composer for the film's score, having previously worked with Fukunaga on Beasts of No Nation and Maniac. Romer left the film due to creative differences in November 2019. Hans Zimmer replaced Romer by January 2020. It is the first time in the Bond series history that a composer has been replaced during post-production, and the second major personnel change for the film after Boyle's departure. Steve Mazzaro produced the score, while Johnny Marr played guitar. The No Time to Die score album was set to be released through Decca Records in March 2020 but was delayed to 1 October 2021 to coincide with the release of the film.

In January 2020, Billie Eilish was announced as the performer of the film's theme song, with her brother, Finneas O'Connell, serving as co-writer as well as the track's producer. The song, which has the same title, was released on 13 February 2020. At the age of 18, Eilish is the youngest artist to record a Bond theme song. The song's music video was subsequently released on 1 October 2020. Despite the film's delay, the song was nominated for and won the Grammy Award for Best Song Written for Visual Media at the 63rd Annual Grammy Awards, on 14 March 2021, six months before the film's release date, because the song itself was released during the 2019–20 eligibility period, in anticipation of the film's original April 2020 release date.

The song "Dans la ville endormie" by French singer Dalida is heard briefly in the opening scene. Louis Armstrong's version of "We Have All the Time in the World", composed by John Barry with lyrics by Hal David, is a recurring theme included three times within the score and originally appeared in On Her Majesty's Secret Service, recalling both love and loss experienced by Bond following a similar poignancy in this film. The track is played in full during the closing credits.

== Release ==
=== Distribution rights ===
The Sony Pictures contract to co-produce the Bond films with Metro-Goldwyn-Mayer and Eon Productions expired with the release of Spectre in 2015. In April 2017, Sony Pictures, Warner Bros. Pictures, 20th Century Fox, Universal Pictures (who later acquired the film's international distribution rights), and Annapurna Pictures (who later created a distribution joint venture with MGM) entered a bidding competition to win the co-distribution rights. MGM secured the North American, digital, and worldwide television rights to the film through its distribution arm United Artists Releasing. Universal became the international distributor and worldwide holder of the rights for physical home media (DVD and Blu-ray) through its subsidiary Universal Pictures Home Entertainment, prior to its joint venture agreement in January 2020 with Warner Bros. Home Entertainment. (Note: In January 2020, Warner Bros. Home Entertainment and Universal Pictures Home Entertainment entered into a pact for a new joint venture to distribute their new releases and libraries for physical home media in North America. Under a separate agreement for international physical home media releases, Warner Bros. will handle the distribution in Belgium, Ireland, Italy, Luxembourg, the Netherlands, and the UK for a few years, while Universal will be responsible for physical home media distribution outside these regions, including Austria, Germany, Switzerland, and Japan. The studios will continue to operate their streaming and video-on-demand businesses independently.)

=== Theatrical release and postponements ===
No Time to Die had its world premiere at the Royal Albert Hall in London on 28 September 2021, and was released in cinemas on 30 September 2021 in the United Kingdom and on 8 October 2021 in the United States in 2D, RealD 3D, 4DX, ScreenX, Dolby Cinema and IMAX. The film also opened the same week in September in South Korea and the following week in October in Brazil, France, Germany, Ireland, Italy, the Netherlands and Russia. China and Australia would see the release later in October and November 2021. The film had the highest box office opening weekend takings in the United Kingdom for any Bond feature.

No Time to Die was originally scheduled for release in November 2019, but was postponed to February 2020 and then to April 2020 after Boyle's departure. (Note: After Boyle's departure, the release was postponed to 14 February 2020, then to 2 April 2020 in the UK and internationally and 10 April 2020 in the US. The world premiere was scheduled for the Royal Albert Hall in London on 31 March 2020.) The premiere in China and a countrywide publicity tour, planned for April 2020, were cancelled due to the early outbreak of COVID-19 in the country. By March 2020, the global spread of the virus and the declaration of a pandemic by the World Health Organization prompted a joint open letter from two Bond fan sites addressed to the producers. The letter asked that the release be delayed to minimise the risk of spreading the disease and to ensure the film's commercial success. On 4 March 2020, MGM and Eon Productions announced that after "thorough evaluation of the global theatrical marketplace" they had postponed the release until 12 November 2020 in the United Kingdom and 25 November 2020 in the United States. (Note: Revised worldwide release dates were not published at the time of the announcement.) No Time to Die was the first major film affected by the pandemic. According to Deadline Hollywood, MGM and Universal needed to assure a strong performance across all international markets. It was hoped that the rescheduling to November would ensure all cinemas, particularly those in China, South Korea, Japan, Italy, and France, that were closed due to the pandemic would be open and operational.

In the early stages of the pandemic, an estimated 70,000 cinemas in China closed, and countries including Australia and the United Kingdom closed cinemas to minimise the spread of the virus. Variety said the studio had already spent $66 million on promoting the film, while The Hollywood Reporter wrote that the delay cost MGM $30–50 million in wasted marketing costs, estimating that the global box office losses could have exceeded $300 million had the film stayed in its April 2020 slot. In October 2020, No Time to Die was delayed again to 2 April 2021. The decision to delay the release was made when it became apparent that theatrical markets, especially in the United States, would not see full demand. After the delay was announced, the British chain Cineworld, the world's second-largest cinema chain, closed its cinemas indefinitely, with its chief executive Mooky Greidinger stating that the delay was the "last straw" for Cineworld following a string of other film delays and cancellations. Cineworld chains would later reopen in May 2021.

In January 2021, the film was rescheduled to 8 October 2021. In February 2021, an earlier release date of 30 September 2021 was announced for the United Kingdom. In August 2021, it was announced that the release date in Australia was delayed from 30 September to 11 November 2021, in response to lockdowns in several states. It was also screened at the Zurich Film Festival on the same day as the world premiere and the first Bond film to be in the official selection at a festival. The release in China was on 29 October 2021.

=== Home media ===
Universal Pictures Home Entertainment released No Time to Die on DVD, Blu-ray, and Ultra HD Blu-ray in the United Kingdom on 20 December 2021 and in the United States on 21 December 2021. It was available from digital download services on 9 November 2021 in the United States. The 31-day theatrical release window of the film is considered a relatively quick turnaround for a film of this size. One factor has been that Bond films attract an older audience, and that demographic has been hesitant to return to cinemas during the pandemic.

No Time to Die was the top-ranking film on Vudu and Google Play for two weeks and iTunes for five weeks. In the UK, it was the highest-selling digital title of 2021, with more than 430,000 units sold. Upon its release in disc format, No Time to Die debuted atop the "NPD VideoScan First Alert" chart for both the overall disc sales and Blu-ray sales in the US. According to The Numbers, it sold a combined 380,902 Blu-ray and DVD units in the first week for a revenue of $9.7 million. It was the top-selling-title on both charts for three weeks. It also debuted at the first position on Redbox's disc rental charts and second on its digital charts. According to the NPD Group, it sold the eighth-highest amount of DVDs and Blu-rays in 2021, and the second-highest in December 2021.

In the UK, it ranked atop the Official Film Chart for three weeks. The film was the highest-selling title on disc in the country during 2021, with 1.15 million units being sold, including 717,500 DVD and Blu-ray units being sold within two weeks. It was also the highest-selling Blu-ray title of 2021 with 237,000 units sold, in addition to becoming the highest-selling title on 4K Blu-ray in the first week of release and selling the highest number of discs for any title in the first week of release since 2017, with 621,000 Blu-ray and DVDs being sold. In addition, it sold a combined 780,000 units across digital platforms and retail in the final week of 2021.

== Reception ==
=== Box office ===
No Time to Die grossed $160.9 million in the United States and Canada and $613.3 million in other territories, for a worldwide total of $774.2 million. It was the fourth-highest-grossing film of 2021. Because of the combined production and promotional costs of at least $350 million, it was estimated that the film would have needed to gross at least $800 million worldwide to break even.

No Time to Die's opening weekend set a $119.1 million box office from 54 countries, including the UK, Brazil, Germany, Italy, Japan, Mexico, and Spain, besting its $90 million projections. It was the first film since the COVID-19 pandemic that crossed $100 million in an overseas debut without the Chinese market. The Hollywood Reporter stated the premiere was the biggest in the United Kingdom since the pandemic began. In the United States and Canada, No Time to Die was projected to gross $65–85 million in its opening weekend. The film made $23.3 million on its first day, including $6.3 million from Thursday night previews (which included $1 million from Wednesday previews), the best total of the franchise. It went on to debut to $55.2 million, topping the box office and marking the fourth-best opening weekend of the franchise. No Time to Die earned an additional $6.9 million on Columbus Day, bringing its four-day total in the United States and Canada to $62.2 million. Deadline Hollywood attributed the slight underperformance to the film's 163-minute runtime limiting the number of showtimes. TheWrap said that the opening was good news for cinemas, even if the studio did not break even during the film's theatrical run, and that it was an encouraging sign for upcoming adult-oriented pictures. The film fell 56% in its second weekend to $24.3 million, finishing second behind newcomer Halloween Kills. No Time to Die was re-released in IMAX for the weekend ending on 23 January 2022 as part of the 60th anniversary of the Bond film series.

No Time to Die became the highest-grossing film of 2021 in Europe, the Middle East and Africa, surpassing F9 on 17 October. In China, the film opened to a $28.2 million weekend, displacing The Battle at Lake Changjin from the top rank on the country's box office, despite 13% of cinemas being closed due to China's policies against local COVID-19 outbreaks. It remained at the top of the box office charts during its second weekend despite a drop of 59%, earning $11.4 million for a cumulative total of $49.2 million according to Artisan Gateway. It became the highest-grossing non-Chinese film of 2021 outside the United States and Canada on 14 November, earning an estimated $24 million for a cume of $558.2 million, which included $126 million in the United Kingdom, $70 million in Germany and $57.9 million in China. It also opened to an $8.2 million weekend in Australia, which was the biggest opening for any film since December 2019.

During the weekend of 19–21 November, No Time to Die overtook F9 to become the highest-grossing non-Chinese film of 2021, reaching a global cume of around $734 million as it grossed an estimated $2.6 million in the United States and Canada, as well as $13.4 million from 72 countries outside the two territories. It overtook Spectre the following weekend to become the third-highest-grossing film in the United Kingdom as well as the second-highest-grossing Bond film in the market with a gross of $129.9 million.

=== Critical response ===
No Time to Die has an approval rating of 83% based on 425 reviews on the review aggregator website Rotten Tomatoes, with an average rating of 7.3/10. The critics' consensus states: "It isn't the sleekest or most daring 007 adventure, but No Time to Die concludes Daniel Craig's franchise tenure in satisfying style." Metacritic assigned the film a weighted average score of 68 out of 100 based on 67 critics, indicating "generally favorable reviews". Audiences polled by CinemaScore gave the film an average grade of "A−" on an A+ to F scale, while those at PostTrak gave it an 83% positive score, with 63% saying they would definitely recommend it.

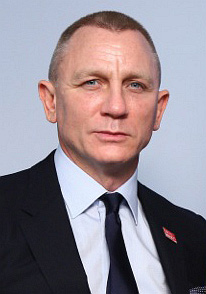
Daniel Craig was praised for his final portrayal of James Bond.

The film received praise from many film critics. Peter Bradshaw of The Guardian called it "an epic barnstormer" delivered "with terrific panache" and with "pathos, action, drama, camp comedy, heartbreak, macabre horror, and outrageously silly old-fashioned action". Robbie Collin of The Daily Telegraph described it as funny, "extravagantly satisfying", with "gorgeous" cinematography, starting with "a sensationally thrilling and sinister prologue" and ending with a "moving conclusion". Kevin Maher of The Times wrote: "It's better than good. It's magnificent"; he later named it one of the best films of 2021.

Barry Hertz of The Globe and Mail wrote that the film "makes sure that my eyes are following every oh-whoa stunt. As well as guaranteeing that I actually care about whether (or, really, how) Bond gets out of this one." Mick LaSalle of the San Francisco Chronicle wrote that the film "takes its place among the best of the entire series", and concluded "Craig leaves the series in a mammoth, 163-minute extravaganza that audiences will be enjoying for decades. It's a lovely thing to see." K. Austin Collins of Rolling Stone described the film as being "just fine: sometimes intriguing, sometimes not, sometimes boring, sometimes not", adding: "It's a bit more successful if we think of it instead as a tribute to the Craig era, and to the star himself."

Michael O'Sullivan of The Washington Post gave the film three out of four stars, writing that it was "a bit too long and a bit too complicated", but added that it was "also a fittingly complicated and ultimately perversely satisfying send-off for the actor". Peter Rainer of The Christian Science Monitor gave the film three out of five stars, writing: "It offers up the requisite thrills, stunts, and bad guys. Beautiful people abound, and 007 still knows how to fill out a tux." However, he questioned "Has James Bond become irrelevant?"

Conversely, some critics found fault with the film. John Nugent of Empire criticised its length (2 hours and 43 minutes), asserting that the plotting and exposition in the middle third "doesn't justify that heaving runtime". Nevertheless, he thought the film "a fitting end to the Craig era". Kyle Smith of National Review also criticised the film's length, and described it as "the least fun and most somber excursion in the entire Bond series". Clarisse Loughrey of The Independent found it uneventful and disappointing: its core premise of a biological weapon of mass destruction was described as "generic spy nonsense", while she felt that Rami Malek "gives almost nothing to the role beyond his accent and stereotyped disfigurement makeup".

David Sexton of New Statesman wrote that the film "shows signs of emerging from an over-deliberated, market-sensitised production process", adding: "It delivers the set-pieces without ever trying to connect them with any urgency, almost like an anthology or re-mix." Brian Tallerico of RogerEbert.com gave the film a score of two out of four stars, writing: "For something that once felt like it so deftly balanced the old of a timeless character with a new, richer style, perhaps the biggest knock against [the film] is that there's nothing here that hasn't been done better in one of the other Craig movies."

Anthony Horowitz, an author of several Bond novels, was disappointed with Bond being killed off in the film. Although he had almost considered doing so once before, he had refrained from killing Bond and felt that the producers should have done the same with the film. He told The Times newspaper, "I didn't do it because, first of all, I think it would be impertinent of me to kill a character that I hadn't created, and secondly, Bond shouldn't die, Bond is forever."

=== Accolades ===
At the 94th Academy Awards, No Time to Die received nominations for Best Sound and Best Visual Effects, and won Best Original Song, becoming the third Bond film to do so after Skyfall and Spectre. The film's other nominations include five British Academy Film Awards (winning one), two Critics' Choice Movie Awards (winning one), and a Golden Globe Award (which it won).

== See also ==
- Outline of James Bond
- Production of the James Bond films
