= Ponte Madonna della Stella =

Ponte Acquedotto Madonna della Stella
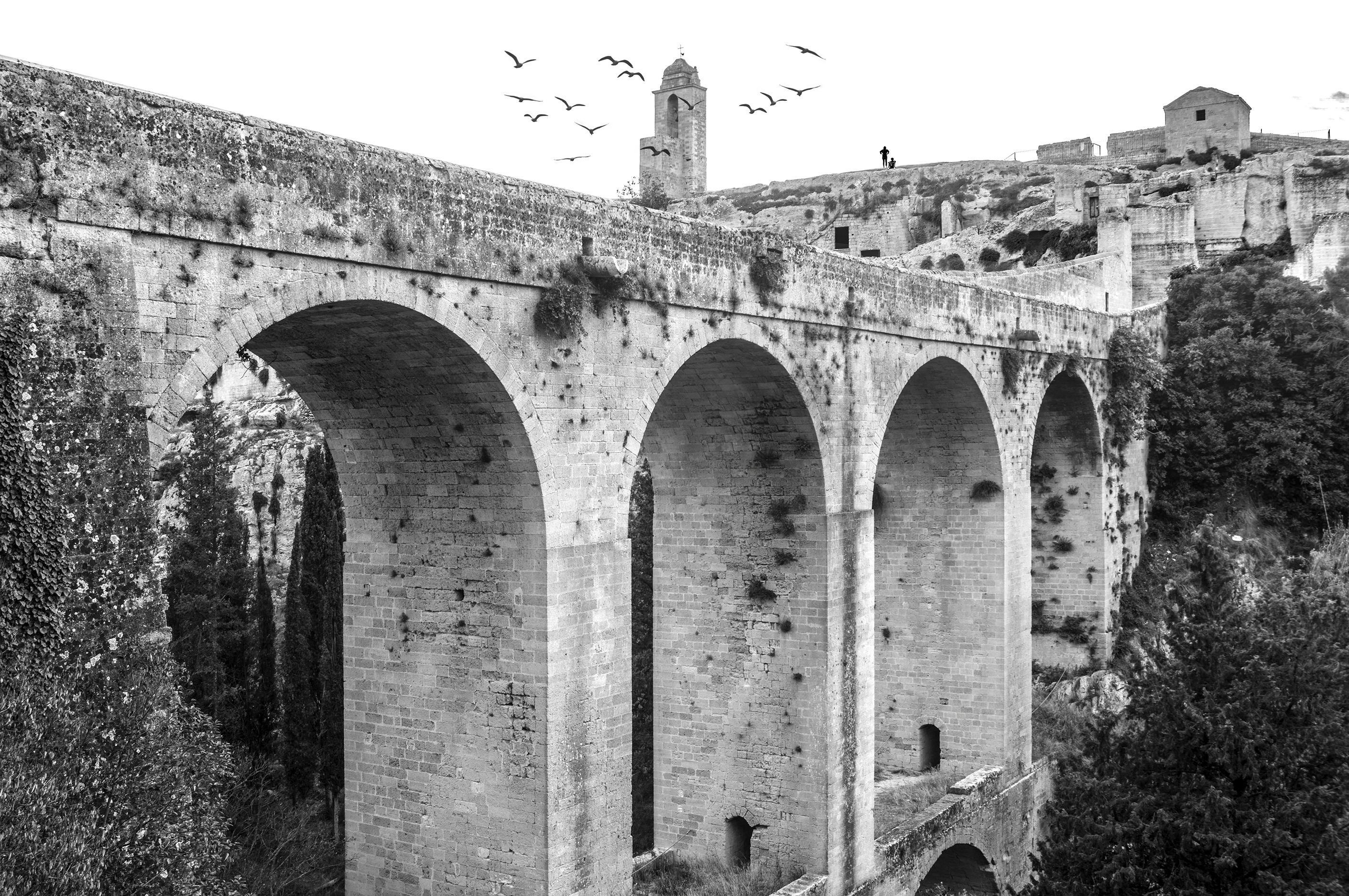
- Coordinates: 40°49′12″N 16°24′46″E
- Crosses: Gravina
- Locale: Gravina in Puglia

Characteristics
- Total length: 90 metres (300 ft)
- Width: 5.5 metres (18 ft)
- Height: 37 metres (121 ft)

History
- Engineering design by: Di Costanzo
- Opened: Eighteenth century

Location
- Interactive map of Ponte Acquedotto Madonna della Stella

The Ponte Madonna della Stella, also known as the Ponte Acquedotto Madonna della Stella, Ponte Viadotto-Acquedotto Madonna della Stella, or simply il ponte di Gravina, amongst other combinations, is an eighteenth-century bridge and aqueduct over the Gravina in the southern Italian town of Gravina in Puglia.

== Name ==
The bridge takes its name from the mediaeval church and rock sanctuary, dedicated to the Madonna, which overlooks the gorge. The bridge leads from the town centre to the east. According to local tradition, Mary was formerly depicted, in a now-lost fresco, in a blue mantle with a silver star (Italian: stella); this image is said to have been revered during the Renaissance as a dispenser of miracles.

== Description ==
The bridge is 90 metres (300 ft) in length and 5.5 metres (18 ft) in breadth, is a two-tier arched structure, rising to a height of 37 metres (121 ft), built in ashlar of locally quarried limestone. It spans the Gravina torrent, formerly known as the Crapo, and functions also as an aqueduct. The parapet on the south side, at 3 metres (9.8 ft), is twice the height of that on the north side, allowing room for the water channel.

The larger aqueduct of which it forms part has its source some 3 kilometres (1.9 mi) northwest of the centre of Gravina, at the Sant'Angelo springs in the area of Lamacolma, where two collection basins capture the waters that emerge from between the Plio-Pleistocene calcarenite and the clay layers above. It leads to two fountains, Fontana La Stella to the west before the bridge is reached, for the supply of drinking water, and another at the east end of the bridge, for use in a washhouse. The largely subterranean aqueduct runs 3,479.51 metres (11,415.7 ft) from its source to this fountain, descending some 7 metres (23 ft) over its length, an average gradient of 0.2% (from an elevation of 359 metres (1,178 ft) at its source to 352 metres (1,155 ft) by the fountain). The aqueduct was constructed with a series of sixty-six inspection shafts along its length, thirty of which may be separately identified at the surface, sunk at an interval of 100–135 metres (328–443 ft). The galleries through which the water flowed have an average height of 1.75 metres (5 ft 9 in), rising to a maximum of 3.5 metres (11 ft), and an average width of 0.77 metres (2 ft 6 in). A double channel, 15 centimetres (5.9 in) in width and with a partition some 10 centimetres (3.9 in) in height, allows one channel to be closed during maintenance work without total interruption of the supply.

== History ==
An earlier bridge that connected the two banks and allowed the faithful to reach the church is first documented in 1686. Likely damaged in the earthquake of that year, it subsequently collapsed in the earthquake of 1722. Around the middle of the century, the Orsini family ordered its reconstruction and transformation into an aqueduct, to bring to the town the waters from the Sant'Angelo and San Giacomo springs. Work on the aqueduct, supervised by the engineer Di Costanzo, and of which the bridge carries but a short part, commenced in 1743 and was largely completed in 1778. The first maintenance and repair works on the water channel began just three years later, and periodic works in a similar vein continued until the aqueduct was superseded by the Apulian Aqueduct in the twentieth century. A series of twenty-five arches formerly carried the water channel over the bridge, but, damaged by a flood in August 1855, they were replaced by a wall of tuff. In 1860, iron tie bars were fitted and rustic paving installed.

The bridge is featured in the pre-credit sequence of the 2021 James Bond film No Time to Die, where it was cinematographically transplanted from Gravina in Puglia to connect Matera with its necropolis; to protect the historic structure during filming (in 2019), it was lined with sheets of steel, and to allow for Bond's leap, fitted with dummy electric cabling. The bridge has also been used in the upcoming The Way of the Wind. At the end of 2019, in recognition of its cultural importance and touristic potential, and specifically citing its recent use at the time in international film productions, the Regione of Apulia awarded a grant of €1.5 million for works on the bridge, including the removal of accretions, pre-emptive weed control, crack mitigation, and improved illumination.

== Gallery ==
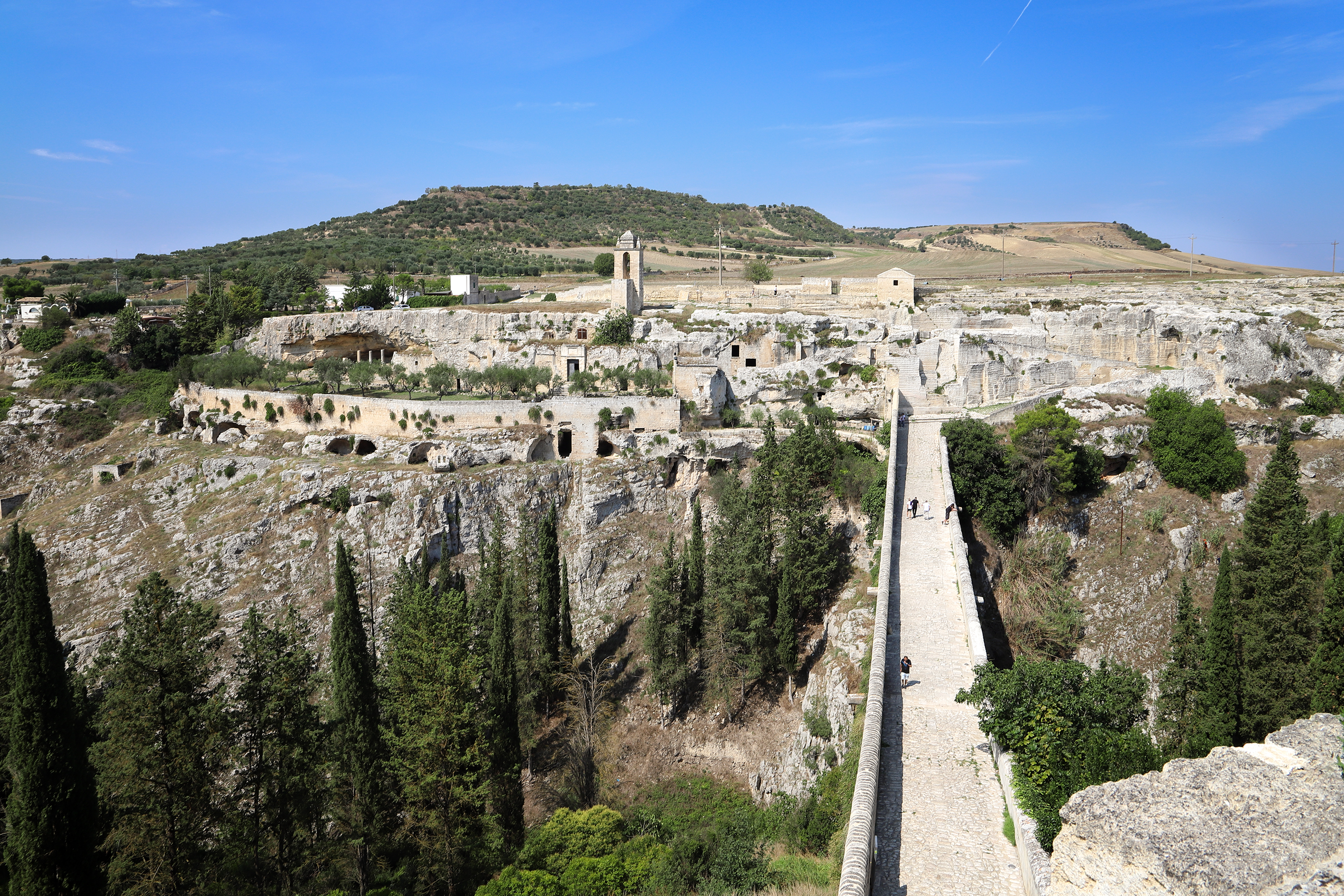
View over the gorge, through which flows the Gravina, towards the eponymous sanctuary to the Madonna to the west

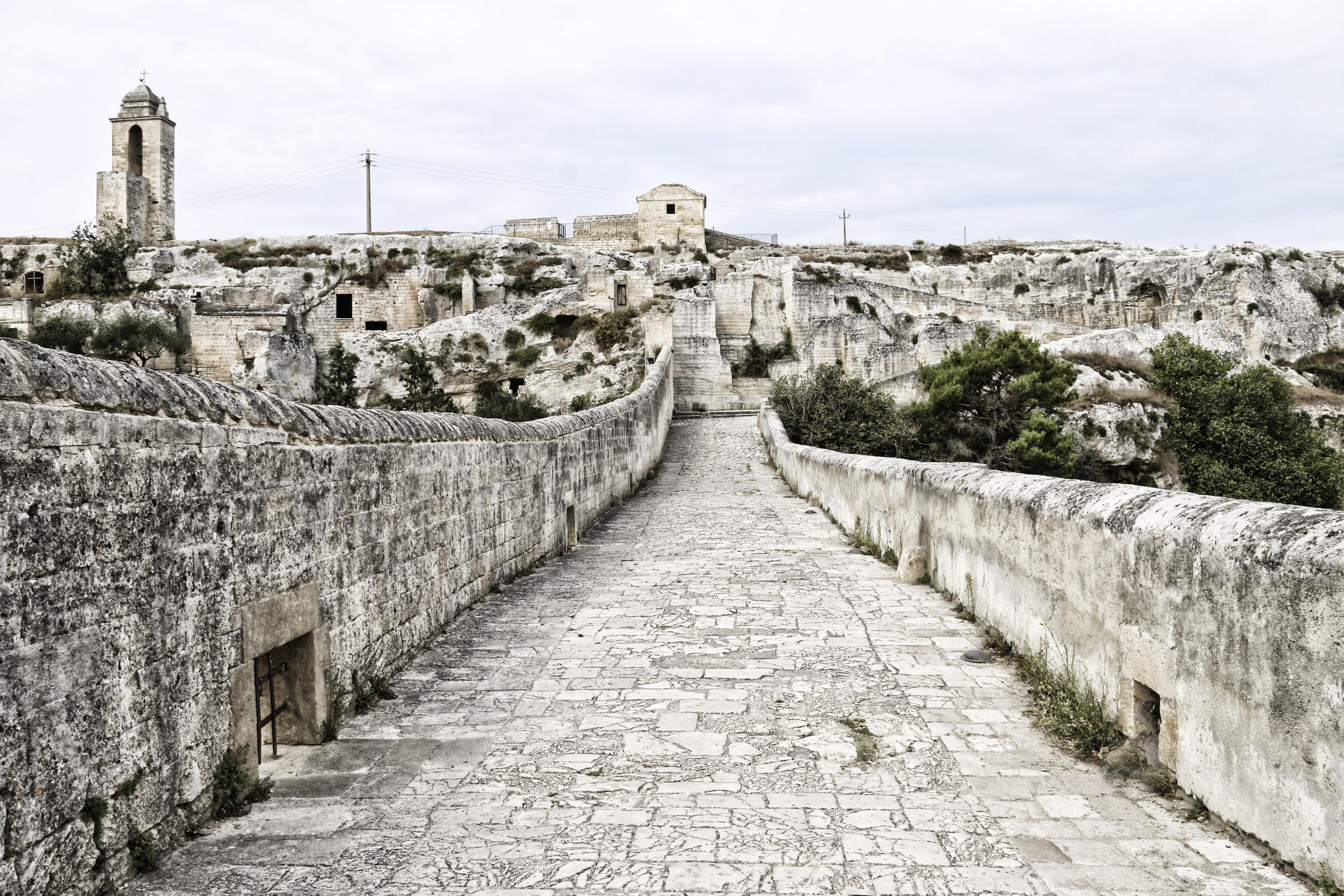
The parapet rises to some 3 metres (9.8 ft) on the south side of the bridge, twice the height of the north, to allow for the water channel

== See also ==
- Metropolitan City of Bari
- Alta Murgia National Park
