= San Giovanni Battista, Matera =

Chiesa di San Giovanni Battista
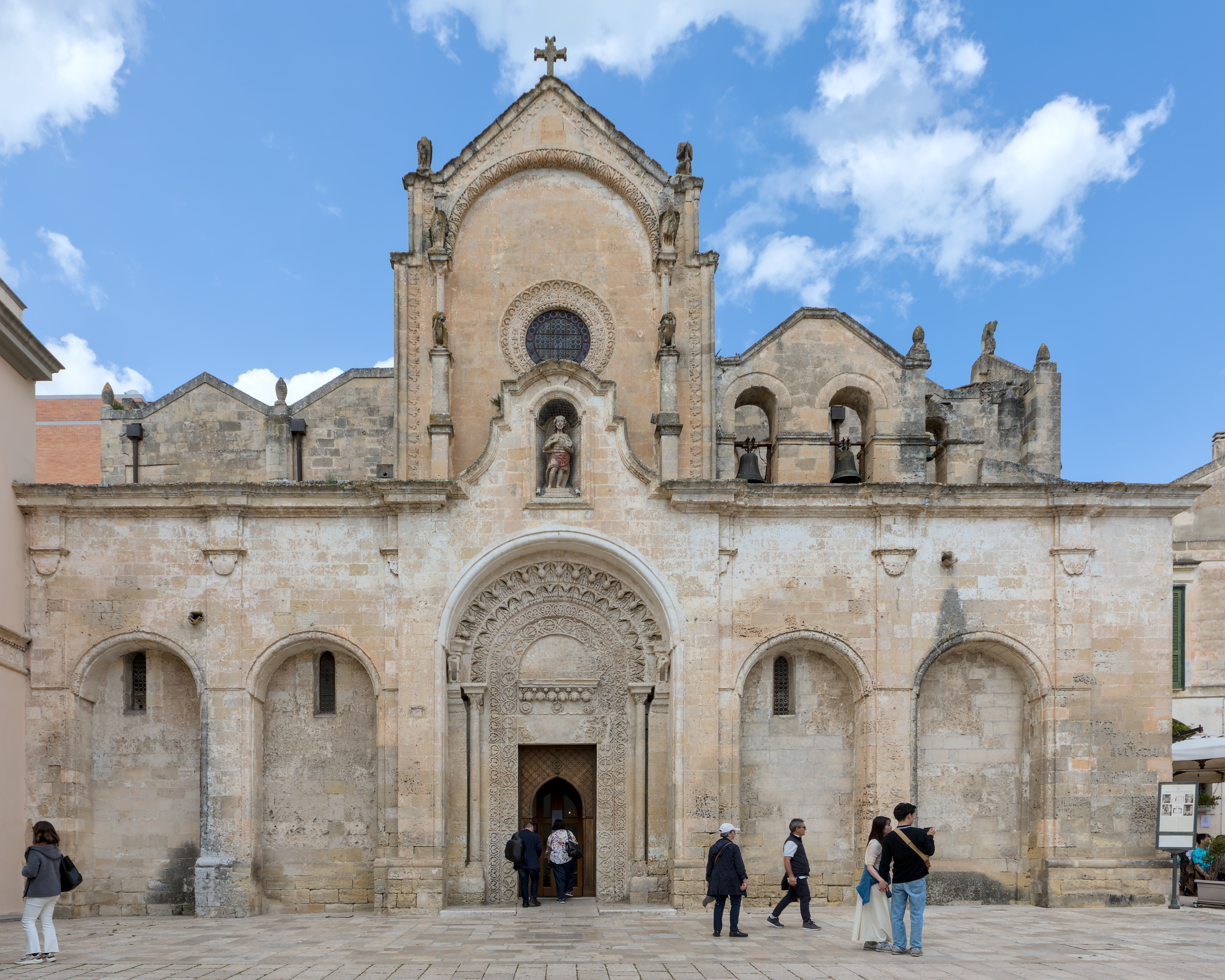
- South façade, opening onto Piazza San Giovanni Battista; to the west, l'ex Ospidale San Rocco
- Chiesa di San Giovanni Battista
- 40°40′04″N 16°36′29″E
- Location: Matera, Basilicata
- Country: Italy

History
- Dedication: Saint John the Baptist
- Dedicated: 1695
- Earlier dedication: Mary
- Consecrated: 1230s

The Chiesa di San Giovanni Battista is a Roman Catholic church dating to the 13th and 18th centuries, located in Matera in the Italian region of Basilicata, and dedicated to Saint John the Baptist. Like the Duomo, the church is an important example of Apulian Romanesque architecture.

== History ==
In 1215, "penitents" of Santa Maria di Accon arrived in Matera from the Kingdom of Acre and, in 1220, they were granted the chapel of Santa Maria la Nova, previously a Benedictine establishment (until 1212). In 1229, they began work on a new church as a replacement for this chapel; this was completed in 1236. In 1480, at the time of the Ottoman invasion of Otranto, the nuns abandoned the church, which lay outside the city walls.

In 1695, due to the poor state of the nearby parish church of San Giovanni Battista in Sasso Barisano, Antonio Del Ryos Colmenares, archbishop of Matera and Acerenza, with the agreement of the nuns of Accon, transferred the parish to the abandoned thirteenth century church of Santa Maria la Nova. Ensuing eighteenth-century additions included the 1701 sacristy and 1735 Cappella del Santissimo Sacramento. At the end of the century, due to the deterioration of the three domes over the transept, they were demolished and replaced with vaults. To help contain the thrust of the new superstructure, the façade was lined with a series of arches, though leaving visible the original thirteenth-century portal, above which there is a statue of the Baptist.

== Description ==
The floor plan is that of a Latin cross with a central nave, with "Lecce vaults" [it], flanked on each side by an aisle with cross vaults. In the left aisle there is a polychrome altar with a fresco above depicting Santa Maria la Nova, while in the Chapel of the Holy Sacrament there is a painting on canvas by local artist Vito Antonio Conversi. In addition to ornate capitals, there are two sculptures attributed to the school of Altobello Persio.

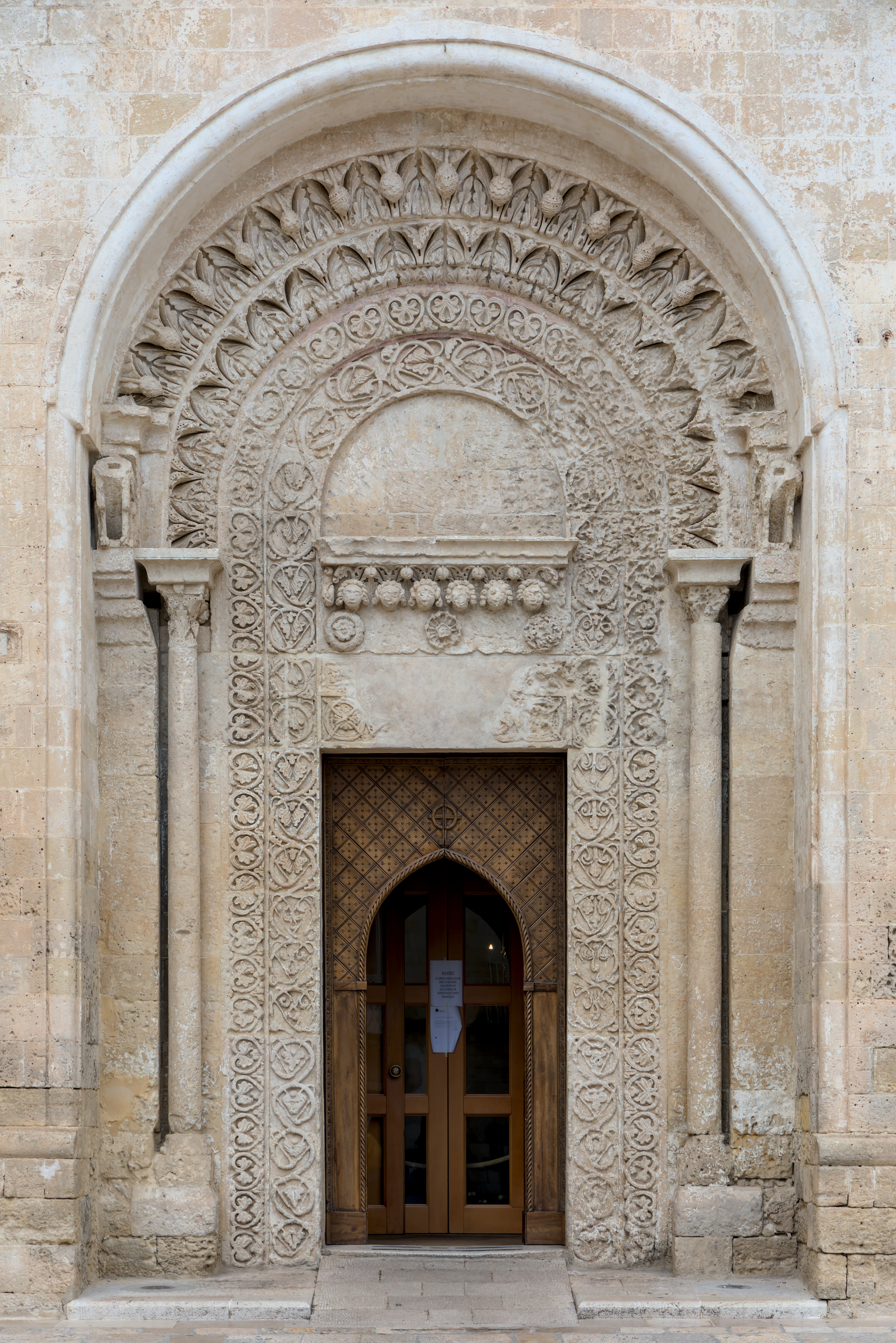
Portal

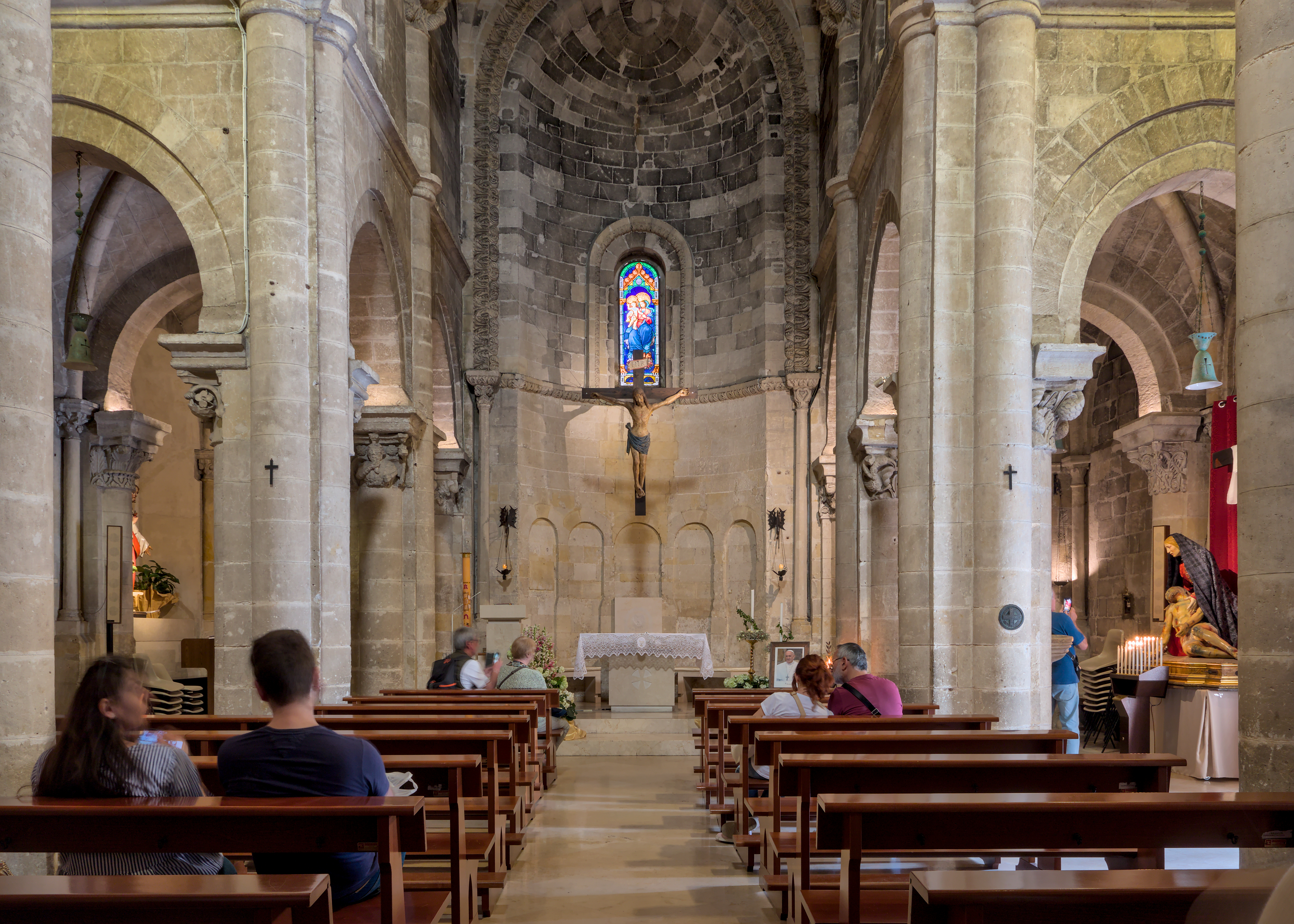
The interior

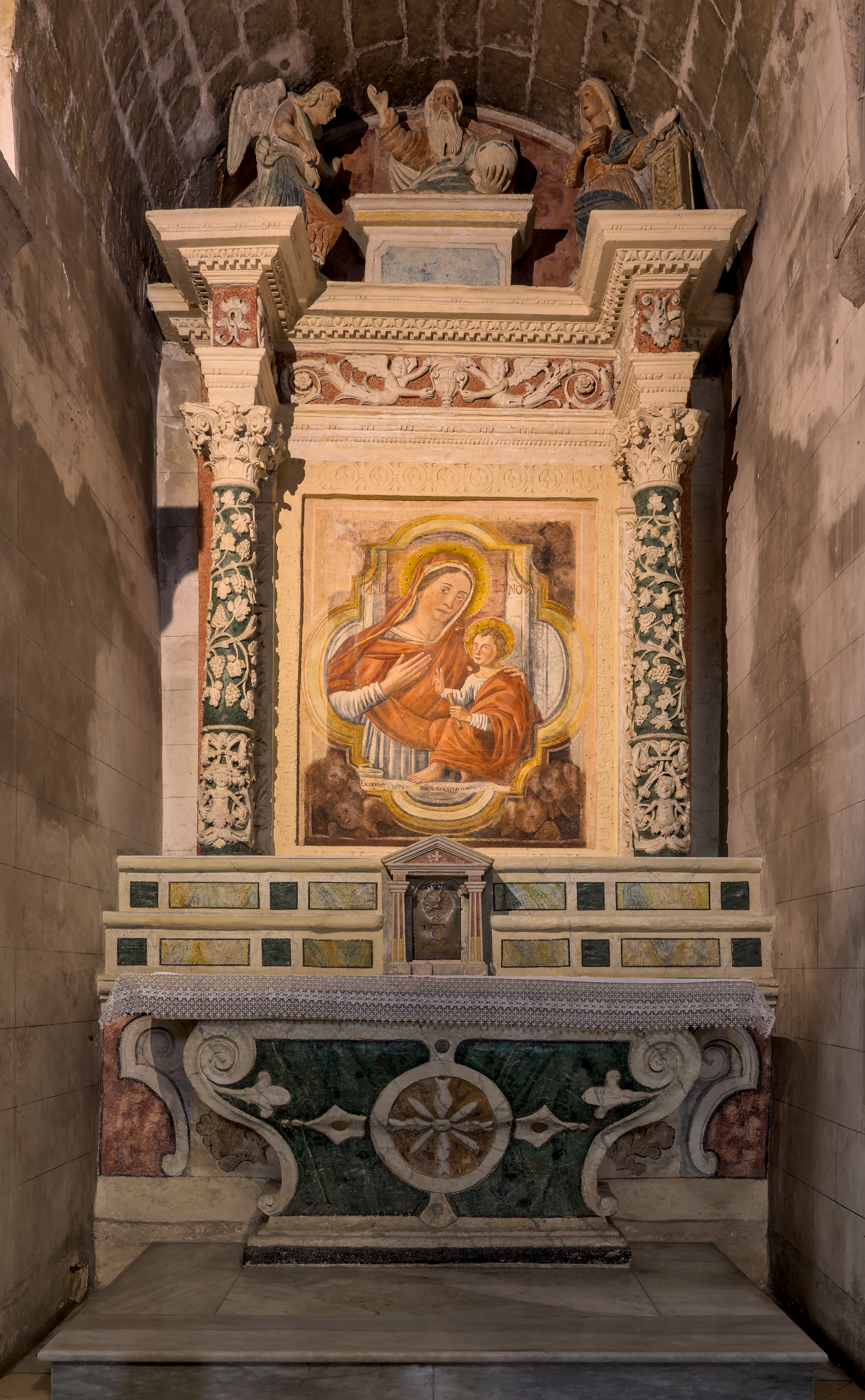
eft side chapel, with a fresco of Santa Maria la Nova above a polychrom altar

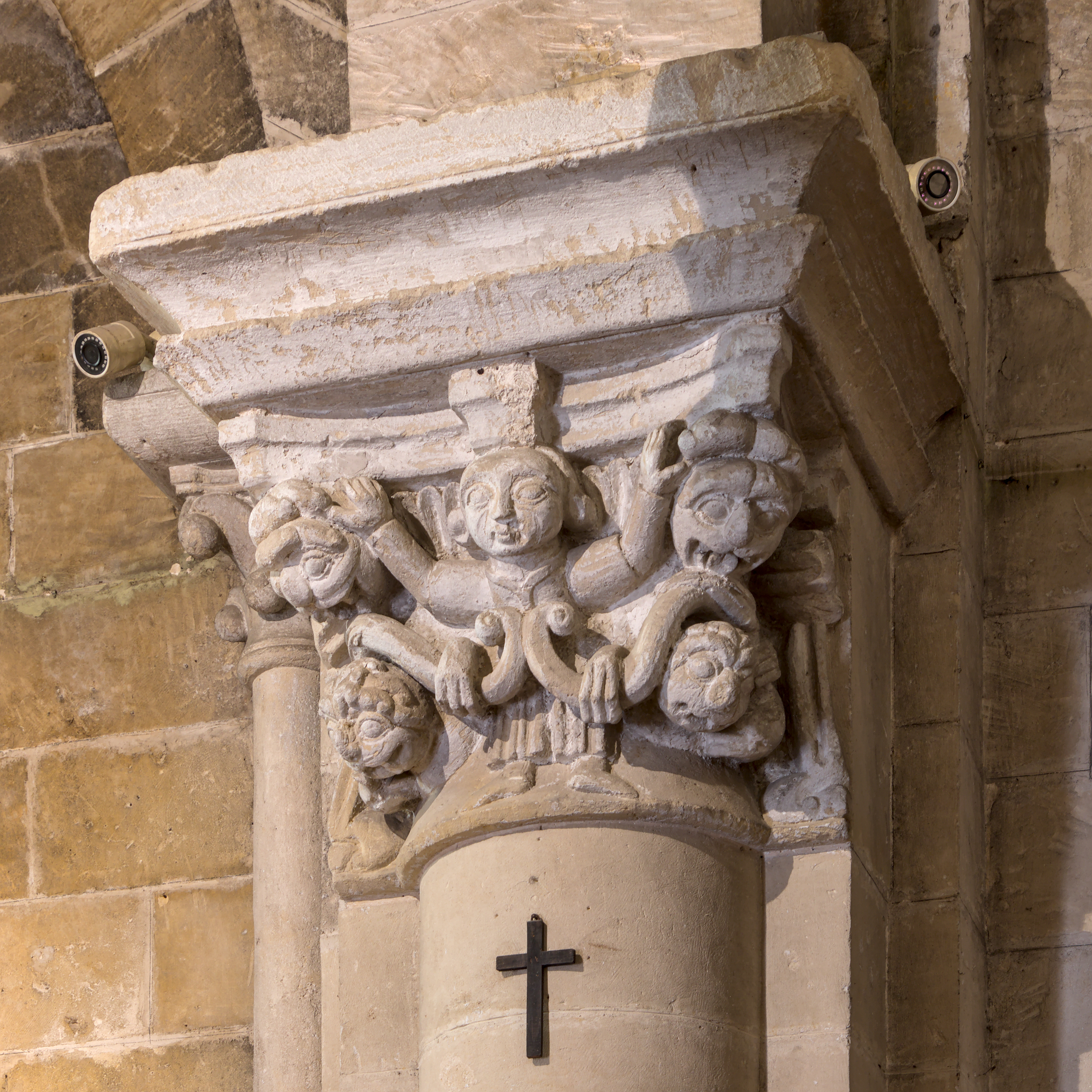
A capital

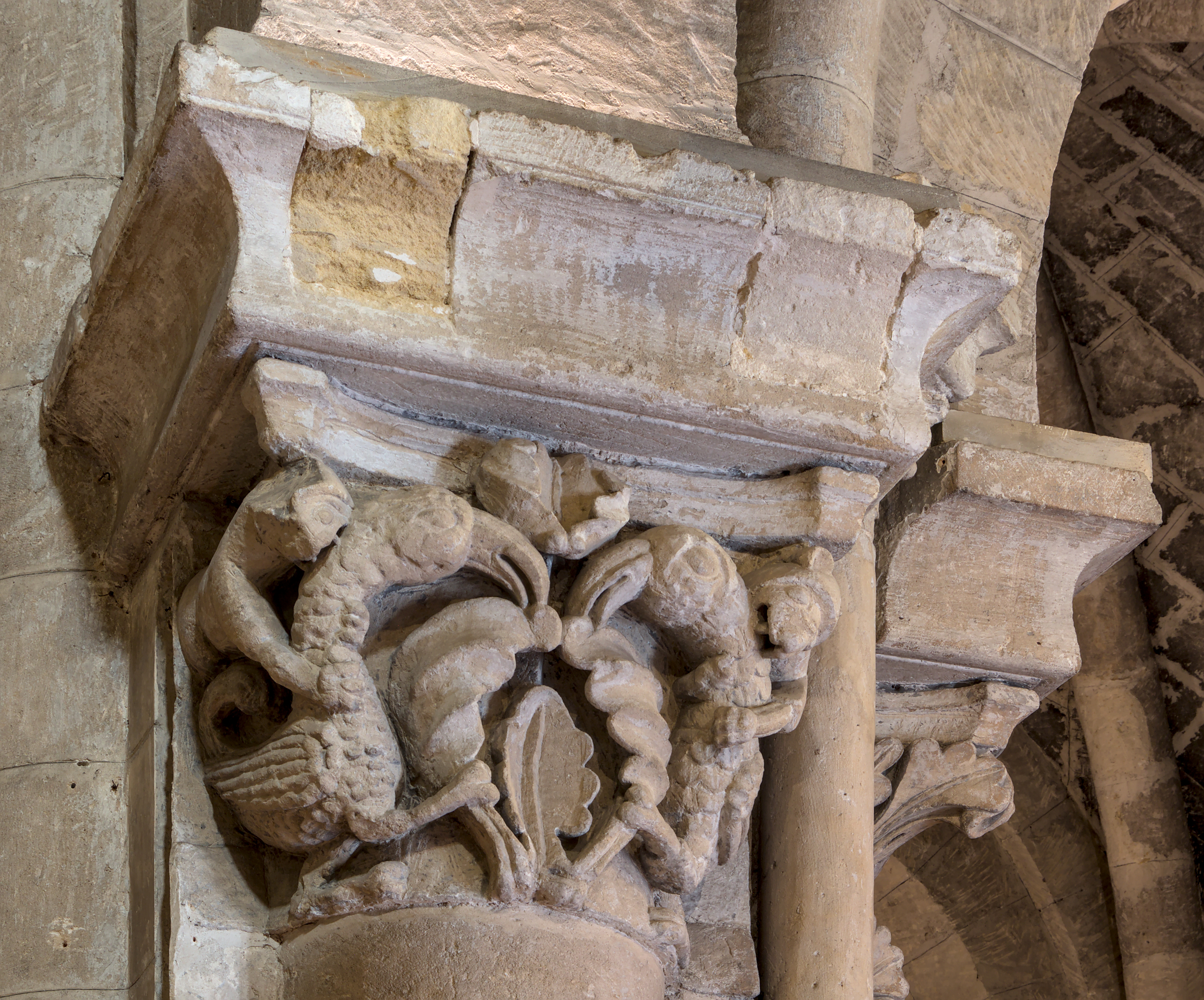
A capital

== Piazza ==
The church opens onto and gives its name to a small piazza. Adjoining the church to the southwest is the former Ospedale di San Rocco [it] (Hospital of Saint Roch), which incorporates the small Chiesa di Cristo Flagellato (Church of the Flagellated Christ), with seventeenth-century frescoes. In 1610, the Hospital incorporated part of the façade of San Giovanni Battista; some sculptural elements, including two elephants and a telamon, were relocated elsewhere on the façade and external walls of the church.

Filming took place in Piazza San Giovanni Battista for the James Bond film No Time to Die (the DB5 doughnut sequence); for this, a dummy bell tower was constructed, while the church exterior was covered in false walls to protect the stonework and to hide "numerous squibs".

== See also ==
- Museo nazionale d'arte medievale e moderna della Basilicata
