= List of accolades received by No Time to Die =

No Time to Die accolades
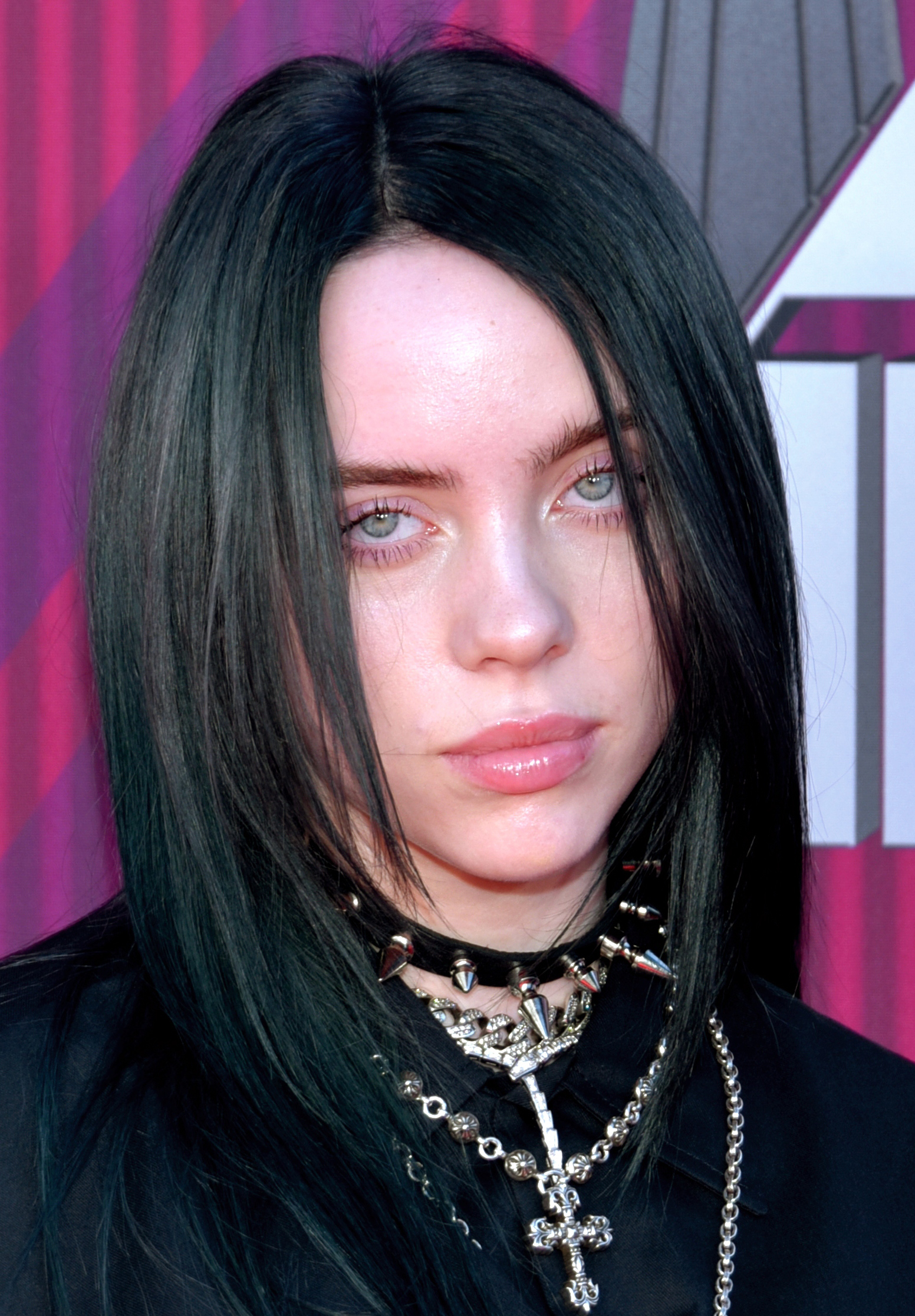
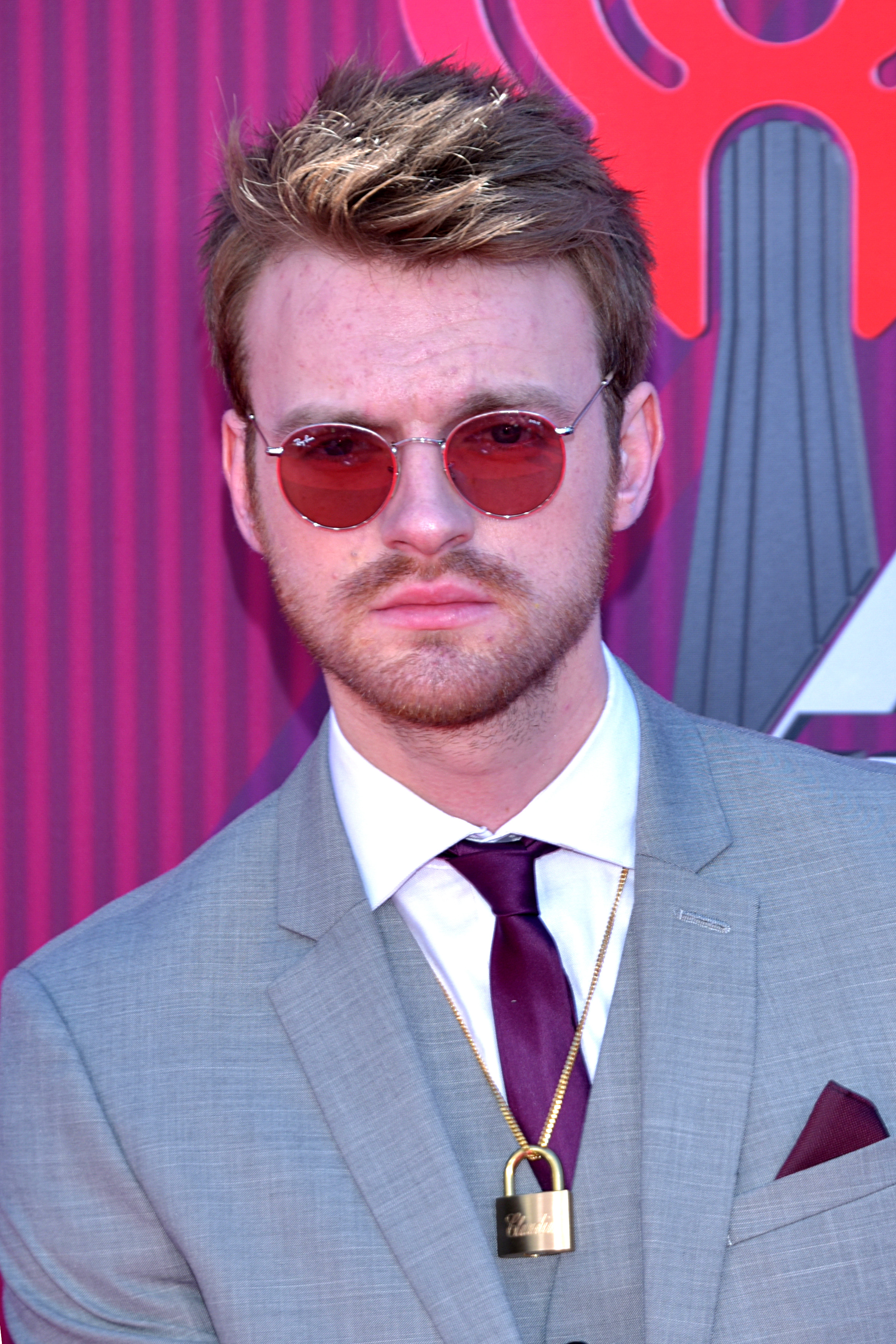
- Billie Eilish and Finneas O'Connell garnered several accolades for composing the song "No Time to Die".
Awards and nominations
Award	Wins	Nominations
Academy Awards	1	3
Actors and Actresses Union Awards	1	1
Alliance of Women Film Journalists Awards	1	1
American Cinema Editors Awards	0	1
Art Directors Guild Awards	1	1
ASCAP Awards	1	1
Austin Film Critics Association Awards	1	1
British Academy Film Awards	1	5
Cinema Audio Society Awards	0	1
Costume Designers Guild Awards	0	1
Critics' Choice Movie Awards	1	2
Critics' Choice Super Awards	2	4
Georgia Film Critics Association Awards	1	1
Golden Globe Awards	1	1
Golden Reel Awards	0	2
Golden Trailer Awards	1	2
Grammy Awards	1	2
Hollywood Critics Association Awards	0	3
Hollywood Critics Association Midseason Awards	0	1
Hollywood Music in Media Awards	1	2
Hollywood Professional Association Awards	0	3
Houston Film Critics Society Awards	1	2
International Film Music Critics Association Awards	0	1
Japan Academy Film Prize	1	1
Location Managers Guild Awards	1	1
London Film Critics' Circle Awards	0	1
Lumiere Awards	1	1
Make-Up Artists and Hair Stylists Guild Awards	0	2
MOBO Awards	0	1
MTV Movie & TV Awards	0	1
People's Choice Awards	0	4
Satellite Awards	0	1
Saturn Awards	0	1
Screen Actors Guild Awards	1	1
Seattle Film Critics Society Awards	0	1
Set Decorators Society of America Awards	1	1
Society of Composers & Lyricists Awards	1	1
St. Louis Film Critics Association Awards	1	1
Visual Effects Society Awards	0	1
World Soundtrack Awards	1	2

Totals (Note: Certain award groups do not simply award one winner. They acknowledge several different recipients, have runners-up, and have third place. Since this is a specific recognition and is different from losing an award, runner-up mentions are considered wins in this award tally. For simplification and to avoid errors, each award in this list has been presumed to have had a prior nomination.)
- Wins: 24
- Nominations: 64

No Time to Die is a 2021 spy film based on the Ian Fleming character James Bond, produced by Eon Productions and distributed by Universal Pictures and United Artists Releasing. (Note: Universal Pictures distributed No Time to Die internationally, and United Artists Releasing for North America.) It is the sequel to Spectre (2015) and the twenty-fifth Eon-produced James Bond film. Directed by Cary Joji Fukunaga from a screenplay by Neal Purvis, Robert Wade, Fukunaga, and Phoebe Waller-Bridge, it stars Daniel Craig as Bond, alongside Rami Malek, Léa Seydoux, Lashana Lynch, Ben Whishaw, Naomie Harris, Jeffrey Wright, Christoph Waltz, and Ralph Fiennes. In the film, Bond, retired from active service with MI6, is recruited by the Central Intelligence Agency to find a kidnapped scientist, which leads to a showdown with bioterrorist Lyutsifer Safin (Malek).

No Time to Die premiered globally at the Royal Albert Hall on 28 September 2021, and was released on 30 September in the United Kingdom and on 8 October in the United States. Produced on a budget of $250–301 million, No Time to Die grossed over $774.2 million worldwide, finishing its theatrical run as the fourth-highest-grossing film of 2021. On the review aggregator website Rotten Tomatoes, the film holds an approval rating of 83% based on 425 reviews.

No Time to Die garnered awards and nominations in various categories with particular recognition for its visual and sound effects, and acting. It received three nominations at the 94th Academy Awards, including Best Visual Effects. The film won Best Original Song ("No Time to Die"), becoming the third consecutive theme song from a film starring Craig as Bond to do so after "Skyfall" (from the 2012 film of the same name) and "Writing's on the Wall" (from Spectre). At the 75th British Academy Film Awards, No Time to Die was nominated for Outstanding British Film, Best Cinematography, Best Sound, and Best Special Visual Effects; and won Best Editing. It received two nominations at the 27th Critics' Choice Awards and won Best Song. Billie Eilish and Finneas O'Connell won Best Original Song at the 79th Golden Globe Awards.

== Accolades ==
Accolades received by No Time to Die
Award	Date of ceremony	Category	Recipient(s)	Result	Ref.
Academy Awards	27 March 2022	Best Original Song	Billie Eilish and Finneas O'Connell for "No Time to Die"	Won	
Academy Awards	27 March 2022	Best Sound	James Harrison, Simon Hayes, Paul Massey, Oliver Tarney, and Mark Taylor	Nominated	
Academy Awards	27 March 2022	Best Visual Effects	Chris Corbould, Jonathan Fawkner, Joel Green, and Charlie Noble	Nominated	
Actors and Actresses Union Awards	14 March 2022	Best Actress in an International Production	Ana de Armas	Won	
Alliance of Women Film Journalists Awards	25 January 2022	Most Egregious Age Difference Between Leading Man and Love Interest	Daniel Craig and Lea Seydoux	Won	
American Cinema Editors Awards	5 March 2022	Best Edited Feature Film – Dramatic	Tom Cross and Elliot Graham	Nominated	
Art Directors Guild Awards	5 March 2022	Excellence in Production Design for a Contemporary Film	Mark Tildesley	Won	
ASCAP Awards	2 May 2022	Top Box Office Films	Hans Zimmer	Won	
Austin Film Critics Association Awards	11 January 2022	Best Stunts	No Time to Die	Won	
British Academy Film Awards	13 March 2022	Outstanding British Film	No Time to Die	Nominated	
British Academy Film Awards	13 March 2022	Best Cinematography	Linus Sandgren	Nominated	
British Academy Film Awards	13 March 2022	Best Editing	Tom Cross and Elliot Graham	Won	
British Academy Film Awards	13 March 2022	Best Sound	James Harrison, Simon Hayes, Paul Massey, Oliver Tarney, and Mark Taylor	Nominated	
British Academy Film Awards	13 March 2022	Best Special Visual Effects	Mark Bakowski, Chris Corbould, Joel Green, and Charlie Noble	Nominated	
Cinema Audio Society Awards	19 March 2022	Outstanding Achievement in Sound Mixing for a Motion Picture – Live Action	Simon Hayes, Paul Massey, Mark Taylor, Stephen Lipson, Mark Appleby, and Adam Mendez	Nominated	
Costume Designers Guild Awards	9 March 2022	Excellence in Contemporary Film	Suttirat Anne Larlarb	Nominated	
Critics' Choice Movie Awards	13 March 2022	Best Song	"No Time to Die"	Won	
Critics' Choice Movie Awards	13 March 2022	Best Visual Effects	No Time to Die	Nominated	
Critics' Choice Super Awards	17 March 2022	Best Action Movie	No Time to Die	Won	
Critics' Choice Super Awards	17 March 2022	Best Actor in an Action Movie	Daniel Craig	Won	
Critics' Choice Super Awards	17 March 2022	Best Actress in an Action Movie	Ana de Armas	Nominated	
Critics' Choice Super Awards	17 March 2022	Best Actress in an Action Movie	Lashana Lynch	Nominated	
Georgia Film Critics Association Awards	14 January 2022	Best Original Song	Billie Eilish and Finneas O'Connell for "No Time to Die"	Won	
Golden Globe Awards	9 January 2022	Best Original Song	Billie Eilish and Finneas O'Connell for "No Time to Die"	Won	
Golden Reel Awards	13 March 2022	Outstanding Achievement in Sound Editing – Dialogue and ADR for Feature Film	Oliver Tarney, Michael Maroussas, Becki Ponting, Adele Fletcher, and Rachel Tate	Nominated	
Golden Reel Awards	13 March 2022	Outstanding Achievement in Sound Editing – Sound Effects and Foley for Feature Film	James Harrison, Oliver Tarney, Bryan Bowen, Eilam Hoffman, Dawn Gough, Hugo Adams, Sue Harding, and Andrea King	Nominated	
Golden Trailer Awards	6 October 2022	Best Action TV Spot	"Weapon" (Big Picture)	Won	
Golden Trailer Awards	6 October 2022	Best Viral Campaign for a Feature Film	"Finale" (ZEALOT)	Nominated	
Grammy Awards	14 March 2021	Best Song Written for Visual Media	Billie Eilish and Finneas O'Connell for "No Time to Die"	Won	
Grammy Awards	5 February 2023	Best Score Soundtrack for Visual Media	Hans Zimmer for No Time to Die	Nominated	
Hollywood Critics Association Awards	28 February 2022	Best Action Film	No Time to Die	Nominated	
Hollywood Critics Association Awards	28 February 2022	Best Original Song	Billie Eilish for "No Time to Die"	Nominated	
Hollywood Critics Association Awards	28 February 2022	Best Stunts	No Time to Die	Nominated	
Hollywood Critics Association Midseason Awards	1 July 2021	Most Anticipated Film	No Time to Die	Nominated	
Hollywood Music in Media Awards	17 November 2021	Best Score – Feature Film	Hans Zimmer	Nominated	
Hollywood Music in Media Awards	17 November 2021	Best Song – Feature Film	Billie Eilish and Finneas O'Connell for "No Time to Die"	Won	
Hollywood Professional Association Awards	17 November 2022	Outstanding Color Grading – Feature Film	Matt Wallach (Company 3)	Nominated	
Hollywood Professional Association Awards	17 November 2022	Outstanding Editing – Feature Film	Tom Cross and Elliot Graham	Nominated	
Hollywood Professional Association Awards	17 November 2022	Outstanding Visual Effects – Feature Film	Mark Bakowski, Bruno Baron, Rob Shears, Steve Ellis, and Denis Scolan (Industrial Light & Magic)	Nominated	
Houston Film Critics Society Awards	19 January 2022	Best Stunt Coordination	Matthew Sampson, Olivier Schneider, Leah Breckman, Jamie Edgell, Yves Girard, Boris Martinez, Gabriele Ragusa, Franco Maria Salamon, and Patrick Vo	Won	
Houston Film Critics Society Awards	19 January 2022	Best Original Song	"No Time to Die"	Nominated	
International Film Music Critics Association Awards	17 February 2022	Best Original Score for an Action/Adventure/Thriller Film	Hans Zimmer	Nominated	
Japan Academy Film Prize	11 March 2022	Outstanding Foreign Language Film	No Time to Die	Won	
Location Managers Guild Awards	27 August 2022	Outstanding Locations in a Contemporary Film	No Time to Die	Won	
London Film Critics' Circle Awards	6 February 2022	Technical Achievement Award	Olivier Schneider (stunts)	Nominated	
Lumiere Awards	4 March 2022	Best Scene or Sequence in a Feature Film	No Time to Die	Won	
Make-Up Artists and Hair Stylists Guild Awards	19 February 2022	Best Contemporary Make-Up	Daniel Phillips	Nominated	
Make-Up Artists and Hair Stylists Guild Awards	19 February 2022	Best Contemporary Hair Styling	Daniel Phillips	Nominated	
MOBO Awards	30 November 2022	Best Performance in a TV Show/Film	Lashana Lynch	Nominated	
MTV Movie & TV Awards	5 June 2022	Best Hero	Daniel Craig	Nominated	
People's Choice Awards	7 December 2021	Movie of 2021	No Time to Die	Nominated	
People's Choice Awards	7 December 2021	Action Movie of 2021	No Time to Die	Nominated	
People's Choice Awards	7 December 2021	Male Movie Star of 2021	Daniel Craig	Nominated	
People's Choice Awards	7 December 2021	Action Movie Star of 2021	Daniel Craig	Nominated	
Satellite Awards	2 April 2022	Best Original Song	Billie Eilish and Finneas O'Connell for "No Time to Die"	Nominated	
Saturn Awards	25 October 2022	Best Action or Adventure Film	No Time to Die	Nominated	
Screen Actors Guild Awards	27 February 2022	Outstanding Performance by a Stunt Ensemble in a Motion Picture	No Time to Die	Won	
Seattle Film Critics Society Awards	17 January 2022	Best Action Choreography	No Time to Die	Nominated	
Set Decorators Society of America Awards	22 February 2022	Best Achievement in Decor/Design of a Contemporary Feature Film	No Time to Die	Won	
Society of Composers & Lyricists Awards	8 March 2022	Outstanding Original Song for a Dramatic or Documentary Visual Media Production	Billie Eilish and Finneas O'Connell for "No Time to Die"	Won	
St. Louis Film Critics Association Awards	19 December 2021	Best Action Film	No Time to Die	Won	
Visual Effects Society Awards	8 March 2022	Outstanding Visual Effects in a Photoreal Feature	Charlie Noble, Mara Bryan, Joel Green, Jonathan Fawkner, and Chris Corbould	Nominated	
World Soundtrack Awards	22 October 2022	Soundtrack Composer of the Year	Hans Zimmer (Note: Also for Dune (2021) and The Survivor (2021))	Nominated	
World Soundtrack Awards	22 October 2022	Best Original Song Written Directly for a Film	Billie Eilish and Finneas O'Connell for "No Time to Die"	Won	

== See also ==
- List of accolades received by Skyfall
