= Golden Reel Award for Outstanding Achievement in Sound Editing – Dialogue and ADR for Feature Film =

Annual award given by the Motion Picture Sound Editors

- Country: United States
- Presented by: Motion Picture Sound Editors
- Currently held by: Steve Boeddeker; Benjamin A. Burtt; David V. Butler; Jason W. Freeman – Sinners (2025)

The Golden Reel Award for Outstanding Achievement in Sound Editing – Dialogue and ADR for Feature Film is an annual award given by the Motion Picture Sound Editors. It honors sound editors whose work has warranted merit in the field of theater; in this case, their work in the field of automated dialogue replacement, or ADR. It was first awarded in 1964, for films released the previous year, under the title Best Sound Editing – Loop Lines. The following year, the award was re-titled Best Sound Editing – Dialogue, and would remain this until 1984, before being changed to Best Sound Editing – ADR. In 1991, the "dialogue" and "ADR" aspects of the process were divided into separate categories and would, intermittently, be awarded for the next seven years, before combining again in 1998, under the title Best Sound Editing – Dialogue & ADR. The award has been given with its current title since 2018.

== Winners and nominees ==
=== 1960s ===
Best Sound Editing – Loop Lines

Year	Film
1963	The Ugly American
1963	Bye Bye Birdie
1963	Move Over, Darling
1963	The Prize
1963	PT-109
1963	Savage Sam

Best Sound Editing – Dialogue

Year	Film
1964	Fate Is the Hunter
1964	The Unsinkable Molly Brown
1964	Cheyenne Autumn
1964	Fate is the Hunter
1964	Father Goose
1964	Good Neighbor Sam
1964	The Secret Invasion
1965	The Sound of Music
1965	Cat Ballou
1965	The Great Race
1965	A Patch of Blue
1965	Red Line 7000
1965	Shenandoah
1966	The Sand Pebbles
1966	The Appaloosa
1966	Maya
1966	Not With My Wife You Don't
1966	The Professionals
1967	Doctor Dolittle
1967	Camelot
1967	Point Blank
1967	The War Wagon
1968	Finian's Rainbow
1968	Coogan's Bluff
1968	Funny Girl
1968	Ice Station Zebra
1968	Rosemary's Baby
1968	Star!
1969	The Wild Bunch

=== 1970s ===
Year	Film	Winners/Nominees
1970	Airport	
1971	Fiddler on the Roof	
1971	The Andromeda Strain	
1971	Cisco Pike	
1971	Dirty Harry	
1971	The Gang That Couldn't Shoot Straight	
1972	The Poseidon Adventure	
1972	Across 110th Street	
1972	The Godfather	
1972	The New Centurions	
1972	Portnoy's Complaint	
1972	Skyjacked	
1973	The Exorcist	
1973	Emperor of the North	
1973	Enter the Dragon	
1973	Papillion	
1973	Paper Moon	
1973	Two People	
1973	White Lightning	
1974	The Towering Inferno	
1974	Badlands	
1974	Blazing Saddles	
1974	Earthquake	
1975	Breakout	
1975	Cleopatra Jones and the Casino of Gold	
1975	Hustle	
1975	Jaws	
1975	Lucky Lady	
1977	The Turning Point	Godfrey Marks (dialogue editor)
1977	Close Encounters of the Third Kind	
1977	The Deep	
1977	Exorcist II: The Heretic	
1977	MacArthur	
1977	Sorcerer	
1977	Star Wars: Episode IV - A New Hope	
1978	Damien: Omen II	Godfrey Marks (dialogue editor)
1978	The Big Fix	
1978	Grease	
1978	House Calls	
1978	The Swarm	
1978	Which Way Is Up?	
1979	Ice Castles	
1979	1941	
1979	The Amityville Horror	
1979	Beyond the Poseidon Adventure	
1979	The Frisco Kid	
1979	Norma Rae	
1979	The Onion Field	
1979	The Wanderers	

=== 1980s ===
Year	Film	Winners/Nominees
1980	Brubaker	Bob Marks (supervising dialogue editor); [Theodore Soderberg (re-recording mixer)
1980	Below the Belt	
1980	The Competition	
1980	Cruising	
1980	First Family	
1980	Gloria	
1980	The Hunter	
1980	The Long Riders	
1980	Popeye	
1980	Stir Crazy	
1980	The Stunt Man	
1981	Raiders of the Lost Ark	Curt Schulkey (supervising dialogue editor); Andy Patterson (dialogue editor); Kevin O'Connell (re-recording mixer)
1981	Back Roads	
1981	Body Heat	
1981	Happy Birthday to Me	
1981	Modern Problems	
1981	Mommie Dearest	
1981	Reds	
1981	Sharky's Machine	
1981	So Fine	
1981	Sphinx	
1981	Thief	
1982	My Favorite Year	David B. Cohn (dialogue editor)
1982	E.T. The Extra-Terrestrial	

Best Sound Editing – ADR

Year	Film	Winners/Nominees
1983	The Right Stuff	C.J. Appel (ADR editor); Richard Hymns (supervising ADR editor); Vivien Hillgrove Gilliam, Barbara McBane (dialogue editors)
1983	Heart Like a Wheel	
1983	Psycho II	
1983	Rumble Fish	
1983	Table for Five	
1983	Terms of Endearment	
1983	Two of a Kind	
1983	Uncommon Valor	
1984	Romancing the Stone	Larry Singer (supervising ADR editor)
1984	2010: The Year We Make Contact	Richard L. Anderson
1984	Amadeus	B.H. Sears
1984	Dune	Les Wiggans, Alan Splet
1984	Gremlins	Richard L. Anderson , Mark A. Mangini
1984	Indiana Jones and the Temple of Doom	Ben Burtt
1984	The Muppets Take Manhattan	Eddie Drohan
1984	Places in the Heart	Richard Cirincione
1984	Protocol	Stan Gilbert
1984	Romancing the Stone	Charles Campbell
1984	Star Trek III: The Search for Spock	George Watters II, Cecelia Hall
1985	Ladyhawke	Larry Singer (ADR editor)
1985	Back to the Future	Larry Singer
1985	Explorers	Steve Purvis
1985	The Goonies	Andrew Patterson
1985	Out of Africa	Bill Manger
1985	Rambo: First Blood Part II	Juno Ellis
1985	Silverado	Norman B. Schwartz
1985	White Nights	Collen Dixon
1986	Top Gun	Andy Patterson (supervising ADR editor); Juno J. Ellis (ADR editor)
1987	Lethal Weapon	Jay Engel (supervising ADR editor); Juno J. Ellis (ADR editor)
1987	Batteries Not Included	Doreen Dixon
1987	Beverly Hills Cop 2	Juno Ellis
1987	Broadcast News	Beth Bergeron
1987	Harry and the Hendersons	Lettie Odney
1987	Police Academy 4	Thomas Whitting
1987	The Running Man	Larry Singer, Alan Nineberg
1987	The Witches of Eastwick	James Beshears
1988	Who Framed Roger Rabbit	Larry Singer (supervising ADR editor); Jessica Gallavan, Alan Nineberg (ADR editors); Charleen Richards, Lionel Strutt (ADR mixers)
1988	Big	
1988	Everybody's All-American	
1988	Midnight Run	
1988	The New Adventures of Pippi Longstocking	
1988	Rambo III	
1988	Scrooged	
1988	Shoot to Kill	
1988	Short Circuit 2	
1989	Born on the Fourth of July	Joe Mayer (supervising ADR editor); Avram D. Gold (ADR editor); Dan Rich, Hugo Weng, Michael D. Wilhoit (dialogue editors)
1989	Black Rain	
1989	Glory	
1989	Harlem Nights	
1989	Honey, I Shrunk the Kids	
1989	Indiana Jones and the Last Crusade	
1989	The Karate Kid Part III	
1989	Lethal Weapon 2	

=== 1990s ===
Best Sound Editing – Automated Dialogue Replacement

Year	Film	Winners/Nominees
1990	The Hunt for Red October	Juno J. Ellis (supervising ADR editor); Shelley Rae Hinton, Jay Kamen (ADR editors)
1990	Awakenings	
1990	Back to the Future Part III	
1990	The Bonfire of the Vanities	
1990	Dick Tracy	
1990	Darkman	
1990	Die Hard 2	
1990	The Guardian	
1990	Hard to Kill	
1990	Predator 2	
1990	Robocop 2	
1990	Total Recall	
1991	Robin Hood: Prince of Thieves	Beth Bergeron (supervising ADR editor); Jane Carpenter-Wilson, Lily Diamond, Jessica Gallavan, Kimberly Harris, Paul Huntsman, Joe Mayer (ADR editors); Jeff Courtie (ADR recordist); Dave Arnold, Wayne Griffin, Allen Hartz, James Matheny, Frank Smathers, David Williams (dialogue editors)
1991	Terminator 2: Judgment Day	
1991	Backdraft	
1991	For the Boys	
1991	Mobsters	
1991	The Silence of the Lambs	
1991	Star Trek VI: The Undiscovered Country	
1991	City Slickers	
1992	Alien 3	William C. Carruth (supervising ADR editor); Petra Bach, Juno J. Ellis, Michele Perrone, Jim Shields (ADR editors)
1992	Bram Stoker's Dracula	
1992	Far and Away	
1992	The Last of the Mohicans	
1992	A League of their Own	
1992	Malcolm X	
1992	Patriot Games	
1992	Universal Soldier	
1992	Used People	
1992	White Men Can't Jump	
1993	Schindler's List	Larry Singer (supervising ADR editor); Allen Hartz, Andrea Horta (ADR editors)
1993	Jurassic Park	Laurel Ladevich, Bob Marty (ADR editors); Michael Silvers, Sara Bolder (dialogue editors)
1993	Benny and Joon	Kimberly Harris (supervising ADR editor)
1993	Cliffhanger	Gregory Baxter (supervising ADR editor)
1993	Demolition Man	James R. Simick (supervising ADR editor)
1993	The Fugitive	Rebecca Sullivan (supervising ADR editor)
1993	Heaven & Earth	Constance A. Kazmer (supervising ADR editor)
1993	Addams Family Values	Juno J. Ellis (supervising ADR editor)
1993	The Program	Beth Bergeron (supervising ADR editor)
1993	What's Eating Gilbert Grape	Jane McCulley (supervising ADR editor)
1994	Forrest Gump	Suzanne Fox (ADR editor); Ewa Sztompke, Dianna Stirpe, Clarie Sanfilippo (dialogue editors)
1994	Blown Away	
1994	Clear and Present Danger	Becky Sullivan (supervising dialogue/ADR editor)
1994	Crooklyn	
1994	Star Trek: Generations	
1994	Little Women	
1994	The River Wild	
1994	Stargate	
1994	True Lies	
1994	Wyatt Earp	
1995	Braveheart	Joseph A. Mayer (ADR supervisor)
1995	Apollo 13	
1995	Crimson Tide	
1995	Batman Forever	
1995	Casino	
1995	Cutthroat Island	
1995	Jumanji	
1995	Rob Roy	
1995	The Scarlet Letter	
1995	Waiting to Exhale	
1996	Jerry Maguire	Chris Jargo (supervising ADR editor); John Adams, Barbara Boguski, Mary Smith (ADR editors)
1996	Broken Arrow	
1996	Daylight	
1996	Independence Day	
1996	The Island of Dr. Moreau	
1996	Mars Attacks!	
1996	The Preacher's Wife	
1996	The Portrait of a Lady	
1996	The Rock	
1997	James Cameron's Titanic	Christopher Boyes (supervising sound editor/sound designer/re-recording mixer); Tom Bellfort (supervising sound editor); Gwendolyn Yates Whittle (supervising dialogue editor); Hugh Waddell (supervising ADR editor); Claire Sanfilippo, J.H. Arrufat, Richard Quinn (dialogue editors); Sue Fox, Harriet Fidlow, Richard Corwin, Cindy Marty, Lee Lemont (ADR editors)
1997	Batman & Robin	Becky Sullivan (supervising dialogue editor); Fred Stafford (supervising ADR editor); Gloria D'Alessandro, Carin Rogers, Robert Troy (dialogue editors); Bobbi Banks, Denise Horta, Lee Lemont (ADR editors)
1997	Con Air	Teri E. Dorman (supervising dialogue editor); Juno J. Ellis (supervising ADR editor); Gloria D'Alessandro, Karen Spangenberg (dialogue editors); Bobbi Banks, Denise Horta, Stephen Janisz, Nicholas Korda (ADR editors)
1997	Face/Off	David Williams (supervising dialogue editor); Robert Ulrich (supervising ADR editor); Gail Clark Burch, Jeff Clark, Richard Corwin, Susan Kurtz, Carin Rogers (dialogue editors); Zack Davis, Stephen Janisz, Kerry Dean Williams (ADR editors)
1997	L.A. Confidential	Becky Sullivan (supervising dialogue editor); Robert Ulrich (supervising ADR editor); Mildred Iatrou, Catherine M. Speakman, Donald L. Warner Jr. (dialogue editors); Andrea Horta, Denise Horta (ADR editors); Diane Linn, Tami Treadwell (ADR recorders)
1997	Men in Black	Bobby Mackston (supervising dialogue editor); Marissa Littlefield (supervising ADR editor); Norm MacLeod (dialogue editor)
1997	Starship Troopers	Michael J. Benavente (supervising dialogue editor); Susan Dudeck (supervising ADR editor); Hugo Weng (dialogue editor); Alison Fisher, Allen Hartz (ADR editors); Diane Linn (ADR recordist)
1998	Saving Private Ryan	Gary Rydstrom (supervising sound editor/sound designer/re-recording mixer); Richard Hymns (supervising sound editor); Gwendolyn Yates Whittle (supervising dialogue editor); Larry Singer (supervising ADR editor); Ewa Sztompke, Sara Bolder (dialogue editors); Denise Whiting, Thomas Whiting (ADR editors)
1998	Armageddon	George Watters II (supervising sound editor/sound designer); Teri E. Dorman (supervising dialogue editor); Juno J. Ellis (supervising ADR editor); Gloria D'Alessandro, Alison Fisher, Carin Rogers, Karen Spangenberg (dialogue editors); Mary Andrews, Andrea Horta, Denise Horta, Stephen Janisz, Nicholas Korda, Denise Whiting (ADR editors)
1998	Bulworth	Paul Timothy Carden, Mark P. Stoeckinger (supervising sound editors); Gail Clark Burch (supervising ADR editor); Mark Gordon, Dan Rich (dialogue editors); Laura Graham, Kerry Dean Williams (ADR editors); David Lucarelli, Cary Stratton (ADR recorders)
1998	Enemy of the State	George Watters II (supervising sound editor/sound designer); Teri E. Dorman (supervising dialogue editor); Fred Stafford (supervising ADR editor); Gloria D'Alessandro, Kimberly Lambert (dialogue editors); Andrea Horta, Nicholas Korda (ADR editors); Rick Canelli (ADR recordist)
1998	The Horse Whisperer	Richard Hymns, Frank E. Eulner, (supervising sound editors); Gary Rydstrom, Steve Boeddeker (sound designers); Karen Wilson (supervising ADR editor); Sara Bolder, Claire Sanfilippo, Ewa Sztompke (dialogue editors); Marilyn McCoppen (ADR editor)
1998	Meet Joe Black	Scott A. Hecker (supervising sound editor); Joe Dorn (supervising ADR editor); Benjamin Beardwood, Gary Lewis, Ralph Osborn (dialogue editors); Allen Hartz, Barbara Issak, David Melhase, Lauren Palmer, Jeff Rosen, Matt Sawelson (ADR editors); Cary Stratton (ADR recordist)
1998	The Negotiator	Mark P. Stoeckinger (supervising sound editor); Robert Ulrich (supervising ADR editor); Neal Anderson, Paul Timothy Carden, Richard Dwan Jr., Mark Gordon, Glenn T. Morgan (dialogue editors); Chris Jargo, Kerry Dean Williams (ADR editors); Dave MacDonald (ADR recordist)
1998	One True Thing	Randle Akerson (supervising sound editor); Kimberly Harris (supervising ADR editor)
1999	American Beauty	Scott Martin Gershin (supervising sound/dialogue editor); Trevor Jolly (supervising ADR editor); Mark Gordon, Simon Coke (dialogue editors); Thomas O'Neil Younkman (assistant ADR editor); Paul Flinchbaugh, Lee W. Lebaigue (assistant dialogue editors); Brian Basham (ADR recordist)
1999	The Cider House Rules	Maurice Schell (supervising sound editor); Laura Civiello (supervising dialogue editor); Gina Alfano (supervising ADR editor); Dan Korintus, Bitty O'Sullivan-Smith, Magdaline Volaitis (dialogue editors); Harry Peck Bolles, Marissa Littlefield (ADR editors)
1999	For the Love of the Game	Kelly Cabral, Wylie Stateman (supervising sound editors); Jennifer L. Mann (supervising ADR editor); Lauren Stephens, Richard Dwan Jr., Elizabeth Kenton, Chris Hogan, Dan Hegeman (dialogue editors); Constance A. Kazmer (ADR editor)
1999	The Green Mile	Mark Mangini (supervising sound editor); Julia Evershade (supervising dialogue/ADR editor)
1999	The Insider	Gregg Baxter, Gregory King (supervising sound/dialogue/ADR editors); Stephanie Flack (dialogue editor), Mary Ruth Smith, Darren King (dialogue editors); Nicholas Korda, Linda Folk (ADR editors)
1999	Inspector Gadget	Lon Bender (supervising sound editor); Chris Jargo, Dave McMoyler (supervising ADR editors); Richard Dwan Jr., Chris Hogan (dialogue editors); Laura Graham, Constance A. Kazmer, Mary Andrews (ADR editors)
1999	The Matrix	Dane A. Davis (supervising sound editor); Charles W. Ritter (supervising dialogue editor); Julia Evershade (supervising ADR editor); Susan Dudeck (dialogue editor)
1999	October Sky	Howell Gibbens (supervising sound editor); Elizabeth Kenton (supervising dialogue/ADR editor); Stephanie Flack (dialogue editor)
1999	The Sixth Sense	Michael Kirchberger (supervising sound editor); Becky Sullivan (supervising ADR editor); David A. Cohen (dialogue editor); Kenton Jakub (ADR editor)
1999	Star Wars: Episode I – The Phantom Menace	Ben Burtt (supervising sound editor/sound designer); Matthew Wood (supervising sound editor); Tom Bellfort (supervising sound editor/supervising dialogue/ADR editor); Gwendolyn Yates Whittle, Sara Bolder (dialogue/ADR editors)

=== 2000s ===
Best Sound Editing – Dialogue & ADR, Domestic Feature Film

Year	Film	Winners/Nominees
2000	Crouching Tiger, Hidden Dragon	Eugene Gearty (supervising sound editor); Kenton Jakub, Jean Tsien (supervising ADR editors); Lewis Goldstein (supervising dialogue editor); Betty P. Teng, Gina Alfano, Hal Levinsohn, Lisa J. Levine (ADR editors); Paul Urmson (dialogue editor)
2000	Almost Famous	Michael D. Wilhoit (supervising sound editor); Kelly Oxford (supervising ADR editor); Laura Harris Atkinson (supervising dialogue editor); Laura Graham (ADR editor); Kimaree Long (dialogue editor)
2000	Erin Brokovich	Larry Blake (supervising sound editor); Aaron Glascock (dialogue editor)
2000	Gladiator	Per Hallberg (supervising sound editor); Chris Jargo (supervising ADR editor); Laura Graham (ADR editor); David A. Cohen (ADR/dialogue editor); Lauren Stephens, Simon Coke, Lou Kleinman (dialogue editors)
2000	Into the Arms of Strangers: Stories of the Kindertransport	Gary Rydstrom (supervising sound editor)
2000	Remember the Titans	Robert L. Sephton (supervising sound editor); Christopher T. Welch (supervising dialogue/ADR editor); Julie Feiner (ADR editor); Cindy Marty, Gaston Biraben, Suhail Kafity (dialogue editors)
2000	Traffic	Larry Blake (supervising sound editor); Aaron Glascock (dialogue editor)
2000	U-571	Jon Johnson (supervising sound editor); Val Kuklowsky (supervising ADR editor); Petra Bach, Michele Perrone (ADR editors); Robert Troy (dialogue editor)
2001	Black Hawk Down	Per Hallberg, Karen Baker Landers (supervising sound editors); Chris Jargo (supervising ADR editor); Mark L. Mangino (dialogue editor/ADR editor); Chris Hogan (dialogue editor)
2001	A.I. Artificial Intelligence	Gary Rydstrom (supervising sound editor/sound designer/re-recording mixer); Richard Hymns (supervising sound editor); Larry Singer, Gwendolyn Yates Whittle (supervising ADR editors); Richard Quinn, Ewa Sztompke (dialogue editors)
2001	A Beautiful Mind	Anthony J. Ciccolini III (supervising sound editor); Deborah Wallach (supervising ADR editor); Stan Bochner, Louis Cerborino, Marc Laub (dialogue editors)
2001	Cats & Dogs	Richard L. Anderson, Elliott Koretz (supervising sound editors); Mark Mangini (supervising dialogue editor/supervising ADR editor); Mary Andrews, Larry Kemp (dialogue editors)
2001	The Fast and the Furious	Bruce Stambler, Jay Nierenberg (supervising sound editors); Becky Sullivan (supervising dialogue editor/supervising ADR editor); Nicholas Korda, Lee Lemont (ADR editors); Mildred Iatrou, Donald L. Warner Jr., Robert Troy, Paul Curtis, William Dotson, Cathie Speakman (dialogue editors)
2001	Ocean's Eleven	Larry Blake (supervising sound editor); Aaron Glascock (dialogue editor)
2001	Pearl Harbor	George Watters II, Christopher Boyes (supervising sound editors/sound designers); Christopher T. Welch (supervising ADR editor); Teri E. Dorman (supervising dialogue editor); Julie Feiner, Cindy Marty, Michelle Pazer (ADR editors); David A. Arnold, Marshall Winn, Ulrika Akander, Allen Hartz (dialogue editors)
2001	Planet of the Apes	Richard L. Anderson, John A. Larsen (supervising sound editors); R.J. Kizer (supervising ADR editor); Alan L. Nineberg (ADR editor); Michael Haight, Susan Dawes (dialogue editors)
2001	Spy Game	George Watters II, F. Hudson Miller (supervising sound editors/sound designers); Juno J. Ellis (supervising ADR editor); Teri E. Dorman (supervising dialogue editor); Denise Horta, Stephen Janisz (ADR editors); David A. Arnold, Marshall Winn, Ulrika Akander (dialogue editors)
2001	Vanilla Sky	Michael D. Wilhoit (supervising sound editor); Kerry Dean Williams (supervising ADR editor); Laura Harris Atkinson (supervising dialogue editor); Tammy Fearing, Eliza Pollack Zebert (ADR editors); Mark Gordon, Vic Radulich, Clare C. Freeman, Susan Kurtz (dialogue editors)
2002	Gangs of New York	Philip Stockton, Eugene Gearty (supervising sound editors); Marissa Littlefield (supervising ADR editor); Hal Levinsohn, Kenton Jakub (ADR editors); Fred Rosenberg (dialogue editor)
2002	Antwone Fisher	Donald Sylvester (supervising sound editor); Mildred Iatrou (dialogue editor)
2002	The Bourne Identity	Per Hallberg, Karen Baker Landers (supervising sound editors); Anna MacKenzie (supervising ADR editor); Chris Jargo, Laura Graham, Michelle Pazer, Julie Feiner (ADR editors); Stephanie Flack, Lauren Stephens, Kimaree Long, Mark L. Mangino, Chris Hogan (dialogue editors)
2002	Catch Me If You Can	Charles L. Campbell, John A. Larsen (supervising sound editors); R.J. Kizer (supervising ADR editor); Susan Dawes, Mildred Iatrou (dialogue editors)
2002	Chicago	Maurice Schell (supervising sound editor); Gina Alfano (supervising ADR editor); Laura Civiello (supervising dialogue editor); Hal Levinsohn, Louis Bertini (ADR editors)
2002	Minority Report	Gary Rydstrom (supervising sound editor/sound designer/re-recording mixer); Richard Hymns (supervising sound editor); Gwendolyn Yates Whittle (supervising ADR editor); Tom Bellfort (ADR editor); Ewa Sztompke, Richard Quinn (dialogue editors)
2002	Road to Perdition	Scott A. Hecker (supervising sound editor/supervising dialogue editor); Joe Dorn (supervising ADR editor); Benjamin Beardwood, Gary Lewis (dialogue editors)
2002	Spider-Man	Stephen Hunter Flick (supervising sound editor); Susan Dudeck (supervising sound editor/supervising ADR editor); Julie Feiner, Alison Fisher, Laura Graham (ADR editors); David A. Arnold, Susan Dawes, Allen Hartz (dialogue editors)
2003	Pirates of the Caribbean: The Curse of the Black Pearl	Christopher Boyes, George Watters II (supervising sound editors/sound designers); Jessica Gallavan (supervising ADR editor); Teri E. Dorman (supervising dialogue editor); Lisa J. Levine, Karen Spangenberg (ADR editors); Ulrika Akander, David A. Arnold, Gloria D'Alessandro, Victoria Rose Sampson (dialogue editors)
2003	Dreamcatcher	Yann Delpuech, Robert Grieve (supervising sound editors); Darren King (supervising ADR editor); Wayne Griffin (supervising dialogue editor)
2003	The Last Samurai	Mark P. Stoeckinger (supervising sound editor); Kerry Dean Williams (supervising ADR editor); Laura Harris Atkinson (supervising dialogue editor); Anna MacKenzie, Kelly Oxford, Michelle Pazer (ADR editors); David A. Cohen (dialogue editor)
2003	Master and Commander: The Far Side of the World	Richard King (supervising sound editor/sound designer); R.J. Kizer (supervising ADR editor); Michael Magill (dialogue/ADR editor); Laura Graham (ADR editor), Donald Sylvester, John A. Larsen, Susan Dawes (ADR editors); Hugo Weng (dialogue editor)
2003	Mystic River	Alan Robert Murray (supervising sound editor); Wade Wilson (sound designer); Juno J. Ellis (supervising ADR editor); Lucy Coldsnow-Smith (supervising dialogue editor); Andrea Horta (ADR editor); Gloria D'Alessandro, Karen Spangenberg, Robert Troy (dialogue editors)
2003	Seabiscuit	Per Hallberg, Karen Baker Landers (supervising sound editors); David A. Cohen, Anna MacKenzie (ADR editors); Chris Hogan, Constance A. Kazmer, Kimaree Long (dialogue editors)
2003	2 Fast 2 Furious	Greg Hedgepath (supervising sound editor); Bobbi Banks (supervising ADR editor); Michael Hertlein (supervising dialogue editor); Fred Stafford, Frederick H. Stahly (ADR editors)
2003	X2: X-Men United	Craig Berkey, John A. Larsen (supervising sound editors); Donald Sylvester (supervising ADR editor); Laura Graham (ADR editor); Jim Brookshire, Susan Dawes (dialogue editors)
2004	Eternal Sunshine of the Spotless Mind	Philip Stockton (supervising sound editor/supervising dialogue editor); Eugene Gearty (sound designer); Marissa Littlefield (supervising ADR editor); Fred Rosenberg (dialogue editor); Hal Levinsohn (ADR editor)
2004	The Aviator	Philip Stockton (supervising sound editor/supervising dialogue editor); Eugene Gearty (supervising sound editor); Marissa Littlefield (supervising ADR editor); Kenton Jakub, Hal Levinsohn (ADR editors); Laura Civiello, Nicholas Renbeck, Fred Rosenberg (dialogue editors)
2004	The Bourne Supremacy	Per Hallberg, Karen Baker Landers (supervising sound editors); Anna MacKenzie (supervising dialogue editor/supervising ADR editor); Chris Jargo, Michelle Pazer, Thomas Whiting (ADR editors); Kimaree Long, Frederick H. Stahly (dialogue editors)
2004	Collateral	Elliott Koretz (supervising sound editor), Becky Sullivan (supervising ADR editor), John C. Stuver (supervising dialogue editor), Mary Andrews (ADR editor), Nancy Nugent (dialogue editor)
2004	Kill Bill: Volume 2	Wylie Stateman (supervising sound editor); Hugh Waddell (supervising dialogue editor); Michael Hertlein, Frederick H. Stahly (dialogue editors); Todd Niesen (dialogue denoising); David Kudell (digital assistant)
2004	The Passion of the Christ	Kami Asgar, Sean McCormack (supervising sound editors); Renée Tondelli (supervising ADR editor); Scott G.G. Haller, Jonathon Lee (dialogue editors)
2004	Ray	Karen Baker Landers (supervising sound editor); Chris Jargo (supervising dialogue/ADR editor); Anna MacKenzie, Michelle Pazer (ADR editors); Kimaree Long, Frederick H. Stahly (dialogue editors)
2004	The Terminal	Charles L. Campbell, Richard C. Franklin (supervising sound editors); R.J. Kizer (supervising ADR editor); Vanessa Lapato (ADR editor); Mildred Iatrou Morgan, Bernard Weiser (dialogue editors)

Best Sound Editing in Feature Film – Dialogue & ADR

Year	Film	Winners/Nominees
2005	Memoirs of a Geisha	Wylie Stateman (supervising sound editor); Renée Tondelli (supervising ADR/dialogue editor); Linda Folk (ADR editor); Laura Harris Atkinson, Julie Feiner, Michael Hertlein, Michelle Pazer (dialogue editors)
2005	The Chronicles of Narnia: The Lion, the Witch and the Wardrobe	George Watters II, Richard Beggs (supervising sound editors/sound designers); Kimberly Harris (supervising ADR editor); David Bach (supervising dialogue editor); Laura Graham, Michele Perrone (ADR editors); David V. Butler (dialogue editor)
2005	Cinderella Man	Anthony J. Ciccolini III (supervising sound editor); Deborah Wallach (supervising ADR editor); Kenna Doeringer (ADR editor); Stan Bochner, Dan Korintus (dialogue editors)
2005	Crash	Sandy Gendler (supervising sound editor); Zack Davis, Karen Vassar Triest (dialogue editors)
2005	Good Night, and Good Luck	Curt Schulkey (supervising sound editor/supervising dialogue/ADR editor); Aaron Glascock (supervising sound editor); Susan Dudeck (dialogue/ADR editor)
2005	Mr. & Mrs. Smith	Cameron Frankley (supervising sound editor); Kimberly Harris (supervising ADR editor); Ulrika Akander (supervising dialogue editor); Laura Graham, Michele Perrone (ADR editors); David V. Butler (dialogue editor)
2005	Munich	Ben Burtt (supervising sound editor/sound designer); Richard Hymns (supervising sound editor); Al Nelson (sound effects editor); Gwendolyn Yates Whittle (supervising ADR editor); Ewa Sztompke (supervising dialogue editor); Bruce Lacey, Barbara McBane, John Nutt (ADR editors); Marilyn McCoppen, Richard Quinn (dialogue editors)
2005	War of the Worlds	Richard King (supervising sound editor/sound designer); Randy Thom (additional sound designer); R.J. Kizer (supervising ADR editor); Laura Graham, Linda Folk (ADR editors); Michael Magill, Hugo Weng (dialogue editors)
2006	Letters from Iwo Jima	Bub Asman, Alan Robert Murray (supervising sound editors); Juno J. Ellis (supervising ADR editor); David A. Arnold (supervising dialogue editor); Nicholas Korda (ADR editor); Lucy Coldsnow-Smith, Gloria D'Alessandro, Karen Spangenberg (dialogue editors)
2006	Apocalypto	Kami Asgar, Sean McCormack (supervising sound editors); Jessica Gallavan (supervising ADR editor); Scott G.G. Haller (supervising dialogue editor); Linda Folk, Lisa J. Levine (ADR editors)
2006	The Da Vinci Code	Anthony J. Ciccolini III, Daniel Pagan (supervising sound editors); Deborah Wallach (supervising ADR editor); Linda Folk, Laura Graham (ADR editors); Teri E. Dorman, Gloria D'Alessandro, Karen Spangenberg (dialogue editors)
2006	Flags of Our Fathers	Bub Asman, Alan Robert Murray (supervising sound editors); Juno J. Ellis (supervising ADR editor); David A. Arnold (supervising dialogue editor); Joe Dorn, Nicholas Korda (ADR editors); Ulrika Akander, Lucy Coldsnow-Smith, Gloria D'Alessandro, James Matheny (dialogue editors)
2006	The Last King of Scotland	Christian Conrad (supervising sound editor); Fabian Schmidt (ADR editor); Dominik Schleier (dialogue editor)
2006	Little Miss Sunshine	Andrew DeCristofaro, Stephen P. Robinson (supervising sound editors); Steve Nelson (sound effects editor); Nancy Nugent (supervising ADR editor); Kerry Carmean-Williams (Foley editor); Patrick Cusack (assistant sound effects editor); John C. Stuver (dialogue editor)
2006	Pirates of the Caribbean: Dead Man's Chest	Christopher Boyes, George Watters II (supervising sound editors/sound designers); Jessica Gallavan (supervising ADR editor); Teri E. Dorman (supervising dialogue editor); Julie Feiner, Howell Gibbens, Lisa J. Levine (ADR editors); Ulrika Akander, David A. Arnold, Gloria D'Alessandro, Michelle Pazer (dialogue editors)
2006	World Trade Center	Wylie Stateman, Renée Tondelli, Michael D. Wilhoit (supervising sound editors); Laura Harris Atkinson, Michael Hertlein (dialogue editors)
2007	The Bourne Ultimatum	Per Hallberg, Karen Baker Landers (supervising sound editors/sound designers); Anna MacKenzie (supervising ADR editor); Chris Jargo, Michelle Pazer (ADR editors); Kimaree Long, Frederick H. Stahly (dialogue editors)
2007	American Gangster	Per Hallberg, Karen Baker Landers (supervising sound editors); Chris Jargo (supervising ADR editor); Chris Hogan, Michelle Pazer (ADR editors); Kimaree Long, Anna MacKenzie, Frederick H. Stahly (dialogue editors)
2007	The Bucket List	Lon Bender (supervising sound editor/sound designer); Tim Boggs (ADR editor)
2007	Ghost Rider	Dane A. Davis (supervising sound editor/sound designer); Bobbi Banks (supervising ADR editor); Stephanie Flack (supervising dialogue editor); Fred Stafford (ADR editor); David A. Cohen, Chris Hogan (dialogue editors)
2007	Michael Clayton	Paul P. Soucek (supervising sound editor); Kenton Jakub (ADR editor); Dan Korintus (dialogue editor)
2007	No Country for Old Men	Craig Berkey, Skip Lievsay (supervising sound editors/sound designers); Kenton Jakub (supervising ADR editor); Byron Wilson (supervising dialogue editor)
2007	Pirates of the Caribbean: At World's End	Christopher Boyes, George Watters II (supervising sound editors/sound designers); Kimberly Harris (supervising ADR editor); Teri E. Dorman (supervising dialogue editor); Julie Feiner, Laura Graham, Michele Perrone (ADR editors); David A. Arnold, Lucy Coldsnow-Smith, Gloria D'Alessandro (dialogue editors)
2007	Transformers	Ethan Van der Ryn, Mike Hopkins, (supervising sound editors/sound designers); Ulrika Akander, David Beadle (ADR editors); Wayne Lemmer, Ralph Osborn (dialogue editors)
2008	The Curious Case of Benjamin Button	Ren Klyce (supervising sound editor/sound designer/re-recording mixer); Gwendolyn Yates Whittle (supervising ADR editor); Richard Quinn (supervising dialogue editor); Jeremy Molod (ADR editor); Marilyn McCoppen, Stuart McCowen (dialogue editors)
2008	Cloverfield	Will Files (supervising sound editor/sound designer/re-recording mixer); Douglas Murray (supervising sound/ADR editor); Cheryl Nardi (supervising dialogue editor); Sue Fox, Gwendolyn Yates Whittle (ADR editors)
2008	The Dark Knight	Richard King (supervising sound editor/sound designer); Linda Folk (supervising ADR editor); Hugo Weng (supervising dialogue editor); Michael Magill (dialogue editor)
2008	Frost/Nixon	Anthony J. Ciccolini III (supervising sound editor); Deborah Wallach (supervising ADR editor); Teri E. Dorman (supervising dialogue editor); David A. Arnold (dialogue editor)
2008	Iron Man	Christopher Boyes (supervising sound editor/sound designer/re-recording mixer); Frank E. Eulner (supervising sound editor); Michael Silvers (supervising ADR editor); Gwendolyn Yates Whittle, John Nutt (ADR editors); Karen Spangenberg, Marshall Winn (dialogue editors)
2008	Milk	Leslie Shatz (supervising sound editor); Robert Jackson (supervising dialogue editor)
2008	The Mummy: Tomb of the Dragon Emperor	Becky Sullivan (supervising sound editor/ADR editor); Daniel S. Irwin (supervising dialogue editor); Michelle Pazer (ADR editor); John C. Stuver (dialogue editor)
2008	Revolutionary Road	Jacob Ribicoff, Warren Shaw (supervising sound editors); Tony Martinez (supervising dialogue/ADR editor); Dan Korintus, Nicholas Renbeck (dialogue editors)
2009	Inglourious Basterds	Wylie Stateman (supervising sound editor); Gregg Baxter (supervising ADR editor); Margit Pfeiffer (supervising dialogue editor); Nancy Nugent (dialogue/ADR editor)
2009	James Cameron's Avatar	Christopher Boyes (supervising sound editor/sound designer/re-recording mixer); Gwendolyn Yates Whittle, Addison Teague (supervising sound editors); Petra Bach, Richard Hymns, Stuart McCowan, Steve Slanec (ADR editors); Kim Foscato, Cheryl Nardi, Marshall Winn (dialogue editors)
2009	500 Days of Summer	Piero Mura (supervising sound editor); Christopher T. Welch (supervising dialogue/ADR editor); Julie Feiner, Beth Sterner (dialogue editors); Judah Getz (ADR mixer)
2009	G.I. Joe: The Rise of Cobra	Per Hallberg, Karen Baker Landers (supervising sound editors); Chris Jargo (supervising dialogue/ADR editor); Tom Bellfort (supervising ADR editor); Michelle Pazer (ADR editor); Chris Hogan, Frederick H. Stahly (dialogue editors)
2009	The Hurt Locker	Paul N. J. Ottosson (supervising sound editor); Robert Troy (supervising dialogue editor); Kimberly Harris (supervising ADR editor); Judah Getz (ADR mixer)
2009	A Serious Man	Skip Lievsay (supervising sound editor); Kenton Jakub (supervising ADR editor); Byron Wilson (supervising dialogue editor); James Morioka (dialogue editor)
2009	Star Trek	Alan Rankin, Mark P. Stoeckinger (supervising sound editors); Kerry Dean Williams (supervising ADR editor); Daniel S. Irwin (supervising dialogue editor); Laura Harris Atkinson (ADR editor)
2009	The Stoning of Soraya M.	Ethan Beigel (supervising sound/ADR editor); Sarah Payan (supervising dialogue editor)

=== 2010s ===
Year	Film	Winners/Nominees
2010	The Social Network	Ren Klyce (supervising sound editor/sound designer/re-recording mixer); Jeremy Molod (assistant supervising sound editor); Richard Quinn (supervising ADR editor); Malcolm Fife (supervising dialogue editor)
2010	Black Swan	Craig Henighan (supervising sound editor); Jill Purdy (supervising dialogue/ADR editor); Nelson Ferreira (dialogue editor)
2010	Harry Potter and the Deathly Hallows – Part 1	James Mather (supervising sound editor); Daniel Laurie (supervising ADR editor); Bjørn Ole Schroeder (supervising dialogue editor)
2010	Inception	Richard King (supervising sound editor/sound designer); R.J. Kizer (supervising ADR editor); Hugo Weng (supervising dialogue editor)
2010	The Kids Are All Right	Frank Gaeta (supervising sound/dialogue/ADR editor); Elmo Weber (supervising sound editor)
2010	The King's Speech	Lee Walpole (supervising sound editor); André Schmidt (supervising dialogue editor); Matthew Skelding (dialogue editor)
2010	Tron: Legacy	Gwendolyn Yates Whittle (supervising sound editor/supervising ADR editor); Addison Teague (supervising sound editor); Michael Silvers (dialogue/ADR editor); Stuart McCowan (ADR editor); Cheryl Nardi (dialogue editor)
2010	True Grit	Skip Lievsay (supervising sound editor); Byron Wilson (supervising dialogue/ADR editor); Kenton Jakub (supervising ADR editor); Katy Wood (dialogue editor)
2011	Super 8	Ben Burtt (supervising sound editor/sound designer); Matthew Wood (supervising sound editor); Gary Rydstrom (additional sound designer); Steve Slanec (sound effects editor); Cheryl Nardi, Richard Quinn (dialogue editors); Stuart McCowan, Brad Semenoff, Gwendolyn Yates Whittle (ADR editors)
2011	Abduction	Bill R. Dean, Greg Hedgepath (supervising sound editors); Bobbi Banks (supervising ADR editor); Daniel S. Irwin (supervising dialogue editor)
2011	The Help	Dennis Drummond (supervising sound editor); Kim Drummond (supervising dialogue/ADR editor); Laura Graham, Scott A. Jennings (ADR editors)
2011	Moneyball	Ron Bochar (supervising sound editor); Michael J. Benavente (supervising ADR editor); Teri E. Dorman (supervising dialogue editor); David A. Arnold (dialogue editor)
2011	Quarantine 2: Terminal	Mark Lanza (supervising sound editor); Rick Ash, Sonja Nyman, Eric Raber (dialogue editors)
2011	Rise of the Planet of the Apes	John A. Larsen, Chuck Michael (supervising sound editors); Mildred Iatrou (supervising ADR editor); Helen Luttrell (supervising dialogue editor); Jim Brookshire, R.J. Kizer (ADR editors); Susan Dawes (dialogue editor)
2011	War Horse	Gary Rydstrom (supervising sound editor/sound designer/re-recording mixer); Richard Hymns (supervising sound editor); Jonathan Null (supervising dialogue/ADR editor); Cheryl Nardi, Richard Quinn (dialogue/ADR editors); Jeremy Molod (dialogue editor)
2011	The Way	Glenn T. Morgan (supervising sound editor); Peter Staubli, Ben Wilkins (dialogue/ADR editors)
2012	Life of Pi	Eugene Gearty, Philip Stockton (supervising sound editors); Kenton Jakub (supervising ADR editor)
2012	Argo	Ethan Van der Ryn, Erik Aadahl (supervising sound editors/sound designers); David Bach (supervising dialogue/ADR editor); David V. Butler (dialogue editor)
2012	Beasts of the Southern Wild	Bob Edwards (supervising sound editor); Chris Gridley (supervising dialogue/ADR editor); Kim Foscato (ADR editor); Michael Silvers (dialogue editor)
2012	The Hobbit: An Unexpected Journey	Brent Burge, Chris Ward (supervising sound editors); Jason Canovas (supervising dialogue editor); Neil Aldridge (ADR editor); Ray Beentjes, Matt Stutter (dialogue editors)
2012	Lincoln	Ben Burtt (supervising sound editor/sound designer); Richard Hymns (supervising sound editor); Jonathan Null (supervising dialogue/ADR editor), Marshall Winn (dialogue/ADR editor)
2012	Moonrise Kingdom	Craig Henighan (supervising sound editor); Lewis Goldstein (supervising dialogue editor); Cate Montana (ADR editor); David Briggs, Jac Rubenstein (dialogue editors)
2012	Silver Linings Playbook	Odin Benitez (supervising sound editor); Eliza Pollack Zebert (supervising dialogue/ADR editor); Christopher T. Welch (ADR editor); Susan Kurtz, Frank Smathers, Mike Szakmeister (dialogue editors)
2012	Skyfall	Per Hallberg, Karen Baker Landers (supervising sound editors); Chris Jargo (supervising ADR editor); Simon Chase (supervising dialogue editor); Anna MacKenzie (ADR editor); Chris Hogan, John C. Stuver (dialogue editors)
2013	Captain Phillips	Oliver Tarney (supervising sound editor); Simon Chase (supervising ADR editor); Bjørn Ole Schroeder (supervising dialogue editor); Rob Killick (dialogue editor)
2013	12 Years a Slave	Robert Jackson (supervising sound/dialogue/ADR editor); Ryan Collins (supervising sound editor); Henry Auerbach (dialogue editor)
2013	American Hustle	John Ross (supervising sound editor); Renée Tondelli (supervising dialogue/ADR editor); Dhyana Carlton-Tims, Kimberly Harris, Michael Hertlein, Mike Szakmeister, Bernard Weiser, Christopher T. Welch (dialogue editors)
2013	August: Osage County	Lon Bender (supervising sound editor); Bobbi Banks (supervising ADR editor); Chris Hogan (supervising dialogue editor); Glynna Grimala (ADR editor); Julie Feiner (dialogue editor)
2013	Gravity	Glenn Freemantle (supervising sound editor); Nina Hartstone (supervising dialogue/ADR editor); Gillian Dodders, Emilie O'Connor (dialogue editor)
2013	Her	Ren Klyce (supervising sound/dialogue editor); Gwendolyn Yates Whittle (supervising ADR editor); Coya Elliott, Malcolm Fife, Steve Slanec (dialogue editors)
2013	Inside Llewyn Davis	Skip Lievsay (supervising sound editor); Kenton Jakub (supervising ADR editor); Judah Getz (ADR mixer)
2013	Lone Survivor	Wylie Stateman (supervising sound editor); Renée Tondelli (supervising dialogue/ADR editor); Michael Hertlein, Branden Spencer (dialogue editors)
2014	Unbroken	Becky Sullivan, Andrew DeCristofaro (supervising sound editors); Glynna Grimala, Lauren Hadaway (ADR editors); Laura Harris Atkinson (dialogue editor)
2014	Birdman or (The Unexpected Virtue of Ignorance)	Aaron Glascock, Martin Hernández (supervising sound editors); Thierry J. Couturier, Michelle Pazer (supervising dialogue/ADR editor); Michele Perrone (supervising dialogue editor); Gloria D'Alessandro (ADR editor); Glynna Grimala (dialogue editor)
2014	Dawn of the Planet of the Apes	Will Files, Douglas Murray (supervising sound editors/sound designers); Mildred Iatrou (supervising dialogue/ADR editor); Jim Brookshire, Kim Foscato, Nancy Nugent (ADR editors); Christopher Barnett, Michael Magill (dialogue editors)
2014	The Grand Budapest Hotel	Wayne Lemmer, Christopher Scarabosio (supervising sound editors); Richard Quinn (dialogue editor)
2014	The Imitation Game	Lee Walpole (supervising sound editor); Dan Green (dialogue editor)
2014	Still Alice	Javier Bennassar (supervising sound/dialogue/ADR editor)
2014	The Theory of Everything	Glenn Freemantle (supervising sound editor); Gillian Dodders, Paul Wrightson (dialogue/ADR editor)
2014	Whiplash	Craig Mann, Ben Wilkins (supervising sound editors); Lauren Hadaway (sound effects editor); Michael J. Benavente (ADR editor); Joe Schiff (dialogue editor)
2015	Bridge of Spies	Gary Rydstrom (supervising sound editor/sound designer/re-recording mixer); Richard Hymns (supervising sound editor); Steve Boeddeker (supervising sound editor/sound designer/re-recording mixer); Steve Slanec (supervising ADR editor); Brian Chumney (supervising dialogue editor)
2015	Mad Max: Fury Road	Scott A. Hecker, Mark Mangini (supervising sound editors); Wayne Pashley (supervising ADR editor); Mark Franken, Kira Roessler (supervising dialogue editors); Yulia Akerholt, Beth Bezzina, Michael Magill, Derryn Pasquill, Ines Richter, Curt Schulkey, Mia Stewart (ADR editors); Sonal Joshi, Danielle Wiessner (dialogue editors)
2015	The Martian	Oliver Tarney (supervising sound editor), Rachael Tate (supervising dialogue/ADR editor)
2015	The Revenant	Lon Bender, Martin Hernández, Randy Thom (supervising sound editors); Lisa J. Levine (supervising dialogue editor); Brian Chumney, Paul Hackner, Shane Hayes, Dror Mohar, Larry Kemp, John C. Stuver, Christopher T. Welch (dialogue editors), G.W. Brown, Julie Feiner, Laura Graham, Michele Perrone (ADR editors)
2015	Room	Niall Brady (supervising sound editor), Peter Blayney (dialogue/ADR editor)
2015	Sicario	Alan Robert Murray (supervising sound editor), Curt Schulkey (supervising dialogue/ADR editor), Kevin R.W. Murray (dialogue/ADR editor), Matthew E. Taylor (dialogue editor)
2015	Star Wars: The Force Awakens	David Acord, Matthew Wood (supervising sound editors); Cheryl Nardi, Brad Semenoff (dialogue/ADR editors); Richard Quinn (ADR editor)
2015	Straight Outta Compton	Greg Hedgepath, Mark P. Stoeckinger (supervising sound editor); Bobbi Banks (supervising ADR editor); Michele Perrone (supervising dialogue editor); Laura Graham, Daniel S. Irwin (dialogue/ADR editors); Kerry Dean Williams (ADR editor)
2016	Hacksaw Ridge	Andy Wright (supervising sound editor); Justine Angus, Kimberly Harris (supervising ADR editors); Michele Perrone (ADR editor); Jed M. Dodge (dialogue editors)
2016	Arrival	Sylvain Bellemare (supervising sound editor); Stan Sakellaropoulos (supervising ADR editor); Valéry Dufort-Boucher, Claire Pochon (dialogue editor)
2016	Deadpool	Jim Brookshire, Wayne Lemmer (supervising sound editors); Susan Dawes (supervising dialogue editor); Laura Graham, R.J. Kizer (ADR editors); Benjamin Beardwood, Teri E. Dorman (dialogue editors)
2016	Hell or High Water	Frank Gaeta (supervising sound editor); Kathryn Madsen (ADR editor); Christopher Battaglia, Harrison Meyle (dialogue editors)
2016	Hidden Figures	Wayne Lemmer, Derek Vanderhorst (supervising sound editors); Susan Dawes (supervising dialogue editor); R.J. Kizer, Helen Luttrell (dialogue editors)
2016	Lion	Robert Mackenzie (supervising sound editor), Glenn Newnham (supervising dialogue editor)
2016	Rogue One: A Star Wars Story	Christopher Scarabosio, Matthew Wood (supervising sound editors); Richard Quinn (supervising ADR editor); James Spencer (dialogue editor)
2016	Sully	Bub Asman, Alan Robert Murray (supervising sound editors); Katy Wood (supervising dialogue/ADR editor); Hugo Weng (dialogue editor)

Outstanding Achievement in Sound Editing – Dialogue and ADR for Feature Film

Year	Film	Winners/Nominees
2017	War for the Planet of the Apes	Will Files, Douglas Murray (supervising sound editors); R.J. Kizer (supervising dialogue editor); P.K. Hooker (sound effects editor); Jim Brookshire, Kim Foscato, Laura Graham (dialogue/ADR editors); Lindsey Alvarez, Doug Jackson (sound effects editors: apes)
2017	Baby Driver	Julian Slater (supervising sound editor); Dan Morgan (supervising dialogue editor)
2017	Blade Runner 2049	Mark Mangini (supervising sound editor); Byron Wilson (supervising dialogue editor); Michael Hertlein (dialogue editor)
2017	Darkest Hour	Craig Berkey, Becki Ponting (supervising sound editors); Michael Maroussas (dialogue editor)
2017	Detroit	Paul N. J. Ottosson (supervising sound editor); Laura Graham, Daniel Saxlid (supervising ADR editors); Robert Troy (dialogue editor)
2017	Dunkirk	Hugo Weng (supervising sound editor); David Bach (supervising ADR editor); Russell Farmarco (ADR editor)
2017	The Shape of Water	Nathan Robitaille (supervising sound editor); Nelson Ferreira (supervising dialogue editor); Jill Purdy (dialogue editor)
2017	Three Billboards Outside Ebbing, Missouri	Joakim Sundström (supervising sound editor); Brian Bowles (ADR editor); Matthew Skelding (dialogue editor)
2018	Bohemian Rhapsody	John Warhurst (supervising sound editor); Nina Hartstone (supervising dialogue/ADR editor); Jens Rosenlund Petersen (dialogue/ADR editor)
2018	The Favourite	Johnnie Burn (supervising sound editor); Michelle Fingleton (supervising dialogue/ADR editor)
2018	First Man	Mildred Iatrou, Ai-Ling Lee (supervising sound editors); Susan Dawes (supervising dialogue editor); Galen Goodpaster (ADR editor)
2018	Green Book	Andrew DeCristofaro (supervising sound editor); Becky Sullivan (supervising ADR editor), Darren Warkentin (supervising dialogue editor); Laura Harris Atkinson, Shane Hayes, Kelly Oxford (dialogue editor)
2018	Mary Poppins Returns	Renée Tondelli (supervising sound editor); Heather Gross (dialogue/ADR editor); Alexa Zimmerman (dialogue editor)
2018	Mission: Impossible – Fallout	James Mather (supervising sound editor); Simon Chase (supervising dialogue editor)
2018	A Quiet Place	Erik Aadahl, Ethan Van der Ryn (supervising sound editors); Robert Jackson (supervising ADR editor)
2018	A Star Is Born	Kira Roessler (supervising dialogue editor); Michelle Pazer, Curt Schulkey, Frederick H. Stahly (dialogue editors)
2019	1917	Oliver Tarney (supervising sound editor); Rachael Tate (dialogue editor)
2019	Avengers: Endgame	Shannon Mills, Daniel Laurie (supervising sound editors); Jacob Riehle, Brad Semenoff (dialogue editors)
2019	Ford v Ferrari	Donald Sylvester (supervising sound editor); Polly McKinnon (dialogue editor)
2019	The Irishman	Philip Stockton (supervising sound/dialogue editor); Eugene Gearty (supervising sound editor); Marissa Littlefield (ADR editor)
2019	Jojo Rabbit	Ai-Ling Lee, Tobias Poppe (supervising sound editors); Susan Dawes (supervising ADR editor); David V. Butler, Helen Luttrell (dialogue editors)
2019	Joker	Alan Robert Murray (supervising sound editor); Kira Roessler (supervising ADR editor); Cameron Steenhagen (dialogue editor)
2019	Once Upon a Time in Hollywood	Wylie Stateman (supervising sound editor); Lindsey Alvarez, Michael Hertlein (dialogue editors); Zach Goheen, Leo Marcil (ADR editors)
2019	Rocketman	Danny Sheehan (supervising sound editor)

=== 2020s ===
Year	Film	Winners/Nominees
2020	The Trial of the Chicago 7	Renée Tondelli (supervising sound/ADR editor); Michael Hertlein, Jon Michaels, Jeena Schoenke (dialogue editors)
2020	Emperor	Glenn Morgan, D. Chris Smoth (supervising sound editors); Robert Jackson (dialogue editor)
2020	Greyhound	Will Digby, Michael Minkler, Warren Shaw (supervising sound editors); Dave McMoyler (supervising ADR editor); Paul Carden, Michelle Pazer, David Tichauer (dialogue editors)
2020	Ma Rainey's Black Bottom	Skip Lievsay, Paul Urmson (supervising sound editors); Lidia Tamplenizza (supervising ADR editor); Michael Feuser (dialogue editor)
2020	Mank	Ren Klyce, Jeremy Molod (supervising sound editors); Richard Quinn (supervising ADR editor); Cameron Barker, Lisa Chino, Kim Foscato (dialogue editors)
2020	News of the World	Oliver Tarney (supervising sound editor); Rachael Tate (supervising dialogue editor); Anna MacKenzie (supervising ADR editor)
2020	Nomadland	Sergio Díaz, Zach Seivers (supervising sound editors)
2020	Sound of Metal	Nicolas Becker (supervising sound editor); Carolina Santana (supervising ADR editor); Michelle Couttolenc (dialogue editor)
2021	Nightmare Alley	Jill Purdy (supervising sound/dialogue/ADR editor); Nelson Ferreira (dialogue editor)
2021	Dune	David Bach (dialogue editor)
2021	Last Night in Soho	Dan Morgan (supervising sound/ADR editor); Julian Slater (supervising sound editor)
2021	The Matrix Resurrections	Dane A. Davis, Stephanie Flack (supervising sound editors); Marek Forreiter, Benjamin Hörbe, Dominik Schleier, Immo Trümpelmann (dialogue editors)
2021	No Time to Die	Oliver Tarney (supervising sound editor); Michael Maroussas, Becki Ponting (supervising dialogue/ADR editors); Adele Fletcher, Rachel Tate (dialogue editors)
2021	The Power of the Dog	Leah Katz (supervising dialogue/ADR editor)
2021	A Quiet Place Part II	Ethan Van der Ryn, Erik Aadahl (supervising sound editors); Vanessa Lapato, Nancy Nugent (supervising dialogue/ADR editors); Matt Cavanaugh (dialogue editor)
2021	The Tragedy of Macbeth	Skip Lievsay (supervising sound editor); Michael Feuser (supervising dialogue editor)
2022	The Banshees of Inisherin	Joakim Sundström (supervising sound editor); Simon Chase (supervising ADR editor); Rebecca Glover (supervising Foley editor); Julien Naudin (Foley artist)
2022	The Batman	William Files, Douglas Murray (supervising sound editors); Jacob Riehle (dialogue editor); Bobbi Banks, David V. Butler (ADR editors)
2022	Elvis	Wayne Pashley (supervising sound editor); Derryn Pasquill (supervising dialogue editor); Libby Villa (ADR supervisor); Nick Breslin, Marisa Marsionis, Lauren Ligovich (dialogue editors)
2022	Empire of Light	Oliver Tarney, Rachel Tate (supervising sound editors)
2022	Everything Everywhere All At Once	Brent Kiser (supervising sound editor)
2022	Top Gun: Maverick	Bjørn Ole Schroeder, James Mather, Al Nelson (supervising sound editors/sound designers); Chris Gridley, Simon Chase, Matthew Hartman, Michael Maroussas (dialogue editors); Gwendolyn Yates Whittle (dialogue/ADR editor)
2023	Oppenheimer	Richard King (supervising sound editor/sound designer); David Bach (supervising dialogue editor); Russell Farmarco, Albert Gasser (dialogue editors)
2023	Barbie	Ai-Ling Lee, Dan Kenyon (supervising sound editors); Brian Bowles (supervising dialogue/ADR editor); Kate Bilinski, Tony Martinez, Tyler Newhouse (dialogue editors)
2023	Killers of the Flower Moon	Philip Stockton (supervising sound editor/dialogue editor) Eugene Gearty (supervising sound editor); Julia Stockton (dialogue editor); Marissa Littlefield (ADR editor)
2023	Maestro	Richard King, Rich Bologna (supervising sound editors); Tony Martinez (supervising dialogue/ADR editor); Eliza Paley, Jac Rubenstein, Fred Rosenberg (dialogue editors); Jason Ruder (supervising music editor)
2023	Napoleon	Oliver Tarney, James Harrison (supervising sound editors); Michael Maroussas (supervising dialogue editor); Rachel Tate (dialogue editor)
2023	Poor Things	Johnnie Burn (supervising sound editor); Tristan Baylis, Peter Russell (dialogue editors)
2024	Saturday Night	David Butler, Will Files, Lee Gilmore (supervising sound editors/sound designers); Helen Lutrell, Emma Present (dialogue editors)
2024	Alien: Romulus	Will Files, Lee Gilmore (supervising sound editors); Matt Cloud (sound effects editor); Polly McKinnon (supervising dialogue editor); David Butler, Ryan Cole, Jacob Riehle, Ailene Roberts (dialogue editors)
2024	A Complete Unknown	Donald Sylvester (supervising sound editor) Russell Farmarco, Anna MacKenzie, Robert Troy(dialogue editors)
2024	Deadpool & Wolverine	Craig Henighan (supervising sound editors); Emma Present (dialogue editor)
2024	Dune: Part Two	Martin Kwok (supervising dialogue editor); Ray Beentjes, Polly McKinnon, Stefanie Ng (dialogue editors); David Bach (ADR editor); Alexis Feodoroff, Justin Webster (crowd editors)
2024	Wicked	John Marquis, Nancy Nugent Title (supervising sound editors); John C. Stuver (supervising dialogue editor); David Bach (dialogue editor)
2025	Sinners	Steve Boeddeker (supervising sound editor/sound designer/re-recording mixer); Benjamin A. Burtt (supervising sound editor); David V. Butler (supervising dialogue/ADR editor); Jason W. Freeman (dialogue/ADR editor)
2025	Bugonia	Johnnie Burn (supervising sound editor); Neal Leachman (dialogue editor)
2025	F1	Al Nelson, Gwendolyn Yates Whittle (supervising sound editors/sound designers); Chris Gridley (supervising dialogue editor); Brad Semenoff (dialogue/ADR editor); Ryan Cota (dialogue editor)
2025	Frankenstein	Nelson Ferreira (supervising sound editor); Stephen Barden M.P.S.E., Dustin Harris, Danielle McBride, Jill Purdy(dialogue editors)
2025	One Battle After Another	Christopher Scarabosio (supervising sound editor/sound designer/re-recording mixer); Richard Quinn (dialogue editor)
