= Golden Reel Awards 2023 =

Sound editing awards

71st Golden Reel Awards
- Date: March 3, 2024
- Location: Wilshire Ebell Theatre; Los Angeles, California, U.S.
- Presented by: Motion Picture Sound Editors
- Hosted by: Patton Oswalt
- Most wins: Oppenheimer (2)
- Most nominations: Alan Wake 2; The Last of Us; Oppenheimer; Star Wars Jedi: Survivor (3)

The 71st Golden Reel Awards, presented by the Motion Picture Sound Editors (MPSE), honored the best in sound editing for film, television, video games, and student films in 2023. The ceremony was held on March 3, 2024, at the Wilshire Ebell Theatre in Los Angeles.

The nominations were announced on January 16, 2024. The film Oppenheimer and the television series The Last of Us led the nominations with three each.

Supervising sound editor and sound designer Dane A. Davis received the Career Achievement Award. Additionally, Michael Dinner was honored with the Filmmaker Award.

Actor and comedian Patton Oswalt hosted the ceremony for the second consecutive year.

== Winners and nominees ==
The winners are listed first and in bold.

=== Film ===
Outstanding Achievement in Sound Editing – Feature Dialogue / ADR	Outstanding Achievement in Sound Editing – Feature Effects / Foley
**Oppenheimer – Richard King (supervising sound editor); David Bach (supervising dialogue editor); Russell Farmarco, Albert Gasser (dialogue editors)**; Barbie – Ai-Ling Lee, Dan Kenyon (supervising sound editors); Brian Bowles (supervising dialogue and ADR editor); Kate Bilinski, Tony Martinez, Tyler Newhouse (dialogue editors); Killers of the Flower Moon – Philip Stockton, Eugene Gearty (supervising sound editors); Julia Stockton, Philip Stockton (dialogue editors); Marissa Littlefield (ADR editor); Maestro – Richard King, Rich Bologna (supervising sound editors); Tony Martinez (supervising dialogue and ADR editor); Eliza Paley, Jac Rubenstein, Fred Rosenberg (dialogue editors); Jason Ruder (supervising music editor); Napoleon – Oliver Tarney, James Harrison (supervising sound editors); Michael Maroussas (supervising dialogue editor); Rachael Tate (dialogue editor); Poor Things – Johnnie Burn (supervising sound editor); Tristan Baylis, Peter Russell (dialogue editors)	**Oppenheimer – Richard King (supervising sound editor); Michael Mitchell (sound effects editor); Randy Torres (sound designer); Christopher Flick (supervising foley editor); Dan O'Connell, John Cucci (foley artists)**; Gran Turismo – Kami Asgar, Erin Oakley (supervising sound editors); Charles Deenen, Tim Gedemer (sound designers); Sam Fan, Matt Cavanaugh (sound effects editors); Gary Hecker, Mike Horton (foley artists); Jessica Parks (foley editor); Ferrari – Tony Lamberti, Bernard Weiser (supervising sound editors); David Wentz (sound designer); Brent Findley, Steven Ticknor, Benjamin Cook (sound effects editor); Beso Kacharava (supervising foley editor); Biko Gogaladze (foley artist); Alexander Sanikidze, Rati Chkhetiani (foley editors); John Wick: Chapter 4 – Paul Soucek (supervising sound editor); Mark Stoeckinger, Luke Gibleon, Olivia Xiao'ou Zhang, Stephen Robinson, Gael Nicolas (sound designers); Casey Genton, Nicolas Interlandi (sound effects editors); Napoleon – Oliver Tarney, James Harrison (supervising sound editors); Mike Fentum, Hugo Adams (sound designers); Aran Clifford, Kevin Penney, Rowan Watson (sound effects editors); Oliver Ferris, Sue Harding (foley artists); The Killer – Ren Klyce (sound designer); Jonathon Stevens, Malcolm Fife (sound effects editors); Jeremy Molod (supervising sound editor); Thom Brennan (supervising foley editor); Dee Selby (foley editor); Shelley Roden, John Roesch (foley artists)
Outstanding Achievement in Music Editing – Feature Motion Picture	Outstanding Achievement in Music Editing – Documentary
**Maestro – Jason Ruder (supervising music editor); Victoria Ruggiero (music editor)**; Barbie – Suzana Perić (supervising music editor); Mick Gormaley (music editor); Creed III – Nicholas Fitzgerald (music editor); Oppenheimer – Amanda Goodpaster (supervising music editor); Felipe Pacheco, Alex Gibson (music editors); Spider-Man: Across the Spider-Verse – Katie Greathouse (supervising music editor); Barbara McDermott (music editor); Wonka – Katrina Schiller (supervising music editor); Mark Willsher, Michael Connell, Janet Grab (music editors)	**Pianoforte – Michal Fojcik (supervising music editor); Joanna Popowicz (music editor)**; American Symphony – Ignacio Bonet (lead music editor); Still: A Michael J. Fox Movie – Bill Bernstein (music editor); Wham! – Greg Gettens (music editor)
Outstanding Achievement in Sound Editing – Feature Documentary	Outstanding Achievement in Sound Editing – Feature Animation
**32 Sounds – Mark Mangini (supervising sound editor); Eliza Paley (supervising ADR editor); Robert Kellough (sound editor); Mari Matsuo (ADR editor); Blake Collins (foley editor); Joanna Fang (foley artist)**; American Symphony – Tristan Baylis, Tom Paul (supervising sound editors); Leslie Bloome (foley artist); Matt Snedecor, Mark Filip (sound effects editors); Mourning in Lod – Yossi Appelbaum, Lior Weitzman (supervising sound editors); Yossi Appelbaum (sound designer); Still: A Michael J. Fox Movie – Skip Lievsay (supervising sound editor); Rich Bologna (sound effects editor); Michael Feuser (dialogue editor); Matt Haasch (foley supervisor); Heather Gross (foley editor); Jay Peck (foley artist); Taylor Swift: The Eras Tour – Phil DeTolve (sound editor); David Cook (music supervisor)	**Spider-Man: Across the Spider-Verse – Geoffrey G. Rubay (supervising sound editor); John J. Pospisil, Alec G. Rubay, Kip Smedley (sound designers); Cathryn Wang, David Werntz, Bruce Tanis, Greg ten Bosch, Daniel McNamara, Will Digby, Andy Sisul (sound effects editors); James Morioka (supervising dialogue editor); Robert Getty, Jason W. Freeman, Kai Scheer, Ashley N. Rubay (dialogue editors); Colin Lechner (foley supervisor); Gregg Barbanell, Jeff Wilhoit, Dylan Wilhoit (foley artist); Katie Greathouse (supervising music editor); Barbara McDermott (music editor)**; Elemental – Ren Klyce, Coya Elliott (supervising sound editors); Ren Klyce (sound designer); Jonathan Stevens, Ben Burtt, Kim Patrick, Steve Bissinger (sound effects editors); Rich Quinn (supervising dialogue editor); Lisa Chino (dialogue editor); Dee Selby (supervising foley editor); Nicolas Docter (foley editor); Shelley Roden, Heikki Kossi (foley artists); Migration – Daniel Laurie, Josh Gold (supervising sound editors); Richard Gould, Luke Dunn-Gielmuda, Scott Guitteau (sound effects editors); Thom Brennan (supervising foley editor); E. Larry Oatfield (foley editor); Sean England, Andrea Gard (foley artists); Bill Bernstein (music editor); The Super Mario Bros. Movie – Daniel Laurie (supervising sound editor); Randy Thom, Jamey Scott (sound designers); Leff Lefferts, Qianbaihui Yang, Scott Guitteau (sound effects editors); E. Larry Oatfield (supervising foley editor); Zach Martin (foley editor); Ronni Brown, Jana Vance, Sean England (foley artists)
Outstanding Achievement in Sound Editing – Foreign Language Feature
**Society of the Snow – Oriol Tarragó, Iosu Martinez, Guillem Giró (supervising sound editors); Erik Vidal, Kiku Vidal (foley artists); Sarah Romero, Marc Bech, Brendan Golden (sound editors); Oriol Tarragó (sound designer); John Finklea (music editor)**; Anatomy of a Fall – Fanny Martin, Jeanne Delplancq (sound editors); Godzilla Minus One – Natsuko Inoue (foley artist); The Zone of Interest – Johnnie Burn (supervising sound editor); Simon Carroll, Max Behrens, Joe Mount, Brendan Feeney (sound effects editors); Ewa Mazurkiewicz, Natalia Lubowiecka, Dawid Konecki, Kamil Kwiatkowski (foley editors)

=== Broadcast media ===
Outstanding Achievement in Sound Editing – Broadcast Long Form Dialogue and ADR	Outstanding Achievement in Sound Editing – Broadcast Long Form Effects and Foley
**The Marvelous Mrs. Maisel: "Four Minutes" – Ron Bochar (supervising sound editor); Sara Stern (dialogue editor); Ruth Hernandez (ADR editor) (Prime Video)**; All the Light We Cannot See: "Episode 4" – Craig Henighan, Ryan Cole (supervising sound editors); Emma Present, Jill Purdy (dialogue editors) (Netflix); Succession: "Connor's Wedding" – Nicholas Renbeck (supervising sound editor); Dan Korintus (dialogue editor); Angela Organ (supervising ADR editor); Andy Kris (dialogue editor and ADR editor) (HBO); Ted Lasso: "So Long, Farewell" – Brent Findley (supervising sound editor); Bernard Weiser, Bruce Hond, Scott Haller (dialogue editors); Daniel Douglass (ADR editor) (Apple TV+); The Crown: "Ritz" – Lee Walpole (supervising sound editor); Iain Eyre (supervising dialogue editor); Steve Little (ADR supervisor); Abbie Shaw, Matthew Mewett (ADR editors) (Netflix); The Last of Us: "Long, Long Time" – Michael J. Benavente (supervising sound editor); Joe Schiff (dialogue editor) (HBO)	**All the Light We Cannot See: "Episode 4" – Craig Henighan, Ryan Cole (supervising sound editor); David Grimaldi (sound effects editor); Matt Cloud (foley editor); Steve Baine (foley artist) (Netflix)**; Ahsoka: "Part Four: Fallen Jedi" – Bonnie Wild, Matthew Wood (supervising sound editors); David Acord (sound designer); Kimberly Patrick, Tim Farrell (sound effects editors); Joel Raabe (supervising foley editor); Shelley Roden, Ronni Brown, Heikki Kossi (foley artist) (Disney+); The Continental: From the World of John Wick: "Theatre of Pain" – Luke Gibleon (supervising sound editor); Nick Interlandi (sound designer); Joshua Adeniji (sound effects editor); Adrian Medhurst, Duncan Campbell (foley editors); Adrian Medhurst (foley artist) (Peacock); Loki: "Glorious Purpose" – Bjørn Ole Schroeder (supervising sound editor); David Chrastka (sound designer); Andre Zweers, Malcolm Fife, Jamey Scott (sound effects editors); Alyssa Nevarez (supervising foley editor); Dawit Zemene (foley editor); Sandra Fox (foley artist) (Disney+); Star Trek: Picard: "The Last Generation" – Matthew E. Taylor (supervising sound editor); Michael Schapiro, Harry Cohen (sound designers); Alex Pugh, Deron Street (sound editors); John Sanacore, Clay Weber (foley editors); Rick Owens (foley artist) (Paramount+); The Last of Us: "When You're Lost in the Darkness" – Michael J. Benavente (supervising sound editor); Chris Battaglia, Chris Terhune (sound designers); Mitchell Lestner, Matt Yocum (sound effects editors); Randy Wilson (supervising foley editor); Davi Aquino, Justin Hale (foley editors); Justin Charbonneau, Stefan Fraticelli, William Kellerman (foley artists) (HBO)
Outstanding Achievement in Sound Editing – Non-Theatrical Feature	Outstanding Achievement in Sound Editing – Non-Theatrical Animation
**The Last Kingdom: Seven Kings Must Die – Jack Gillies (supervising sound editor); Michael Williams (dialogue and ADR supervisor); Steve Berezai (ADR editor); Neale Ross (foley editor); Jason Swanscott (foley artist) (Netflix)**; Black Mirror: "Beyond the Sea" – Antony Bayman (supervising sound editor); Alex Sawyer (dialogue and ADR editor); Jane Lo (sound effects editor); Adam Méndez (supervising foley editor); Rob Davidson (foley editor); Sue Harding (foley artist) (Netflix); Mr. Monk's Last Case: A Monk Movie – Brent Findley (supervising sound editor); Dan Kremer (sound effects editor); Dan Douglass (dialogue editor); Brian Staub (foley artist) (Peacock); Publish or Perish – Leslie Gaston-Bird (supervising sound editor); Anna Sulley (supervising foley editor); Lora Cornes, Naomi Graham, Jahmai Bruce (dialogue editors); Ruth Sullivan, Karo Jedrzejczyk (foley artists) (Alation Media)	**The Monkey King – David Giammarco, Eric A. Norris (supervising sound editors); Sean Massey (dialogue editor); Jon Title, Tim Nielsen (sound designers); Dan O'Connell, John Cucci (foley artists) (Netflix)**; Blue Eye Samurai: "All Evil Dreams and Angry Words" – Myron Nettinga (supervising sound editor); Paulette Lifton (supervising dialogue editor); Sam Hayward, Jared Dwyer, Andrew Miller (sound designers); Johanna Turner (sound editor); Jason Charbonneau, Stefan Fraticelli (foley artists); Justin Helle (foley editor) (Netflix); Blue Eye Samurai: "Hammerscale" – Paul N. J. Ottosson (supervising sound editor); Leo Marcel (sound effects editor); Daniel Saxlix (dialogue editor); Shawn Kennelley (foley editor); Melissa Kennelley, Vince Nicastro (foley artists) (Netflix); Justice League: Warworld – Robert Hargreaves (sound designer); Mark Keatts (supervising dialogue editor); Mike Garcia, Kelly Foley-Downs (dialogue editors) (Warner Bros. Animation)
Outstanding Achievement in Sound Editing – Broadcast Short Form	Outstanding Achievement in Sound Editing – Broadcast Animation
**The Mandalorian: "Chapter 24: The Return" – Trey Turner, Matthew Wood (supervising sound editors); David W. Collins (sound designer); Luis Galdames, Kevin Bolen (sound effects editors); Brad Semenoff, Ryan Coda (ADR editors); Frank Rinella (supervising foley editor); Joel Raabe, Alyssa Nevarez (foley editors); Shelly Roden (foley artist) (Disney+)**; American Horror Story: Delicate: "When the Bough Breaks" – Christian Buenaventura, Gary Megregian (supervising sound editor); Tim Cleveland (sound effects editor); Steve Stuhr (dialogue editor); Sam Munoz (foley editor); Noel Vought (foley artist) (FX); Barry: "wow" – Sean Heissinger, Matthew E. Taylor (supervising sound editors); Rickley W. Dumm (sound designer); Deron Street (sound editor); John Creed (dialogue editor); Clay Weber (supervising foley editor); Darrin Mann (foley editor); Alyson Dee Moore, Chris Moriana (foley artists) (HBO); Beef: "The Great Fabricator" – Christopher Gomez (supervising sound editor); Jerry Lafuente (sound effects editor); Nathan Efstation (dialogue editor); Igor Yashin (foley editor); Ruslan Schebisty (foley artist) (Netflix); The Bear: "Fishes" – Steve "Major" Giammaria, Andrea Bella (supervising sound editors); Matt Snedecor (sound effects editor); Evan Benjamin, John Werner (dialogue editors); John Bowen (ADR editor); Annie Taylor (foley editor); Leslie Bloome, Shaun Brennan (foley artists) (FX)	**Star Wars: The Bad Batch: "Faster" – David W. Collins, Matthew Wood (supervising sound editors); David W. Collins (sound designer); Justin Doyle, Kevin Bolen, Kimberly Patrick (sound effects editors); Frank Rinella (supervising foley editor); Kimberly Patrick, Margie O'Malley, Andrea Gard (foley artists) (Disney+)**; Rick and Morty: "Unmortricken" – Hunter Curra (supervising sound editor); James A. Moore (sound editor); Corbin Bumeter (sound effects editor); Ricardo Watson (dialogue editor) (Adult Swim); Star Trek: Lower Decks: "Old Friends, New Planets" – James Lucero (supervising sound editor); Mak Kellerman, John Wynn (sound effects editors); Michael Britt (foley editor) (Paramount+); Star Wars: Visions: "The Pit" – David W. Collins (supervising sound editor); David W. Collins (sound designer); Kevin Bolen, Bill Rudolph (sound effects editors); David W. Collins (dialogue editor); Alex Wilmer (supervising foley editor); Shelley Roden, Xiuzhu (Mimi) Guo (foley artists) (Disney+); Transformers: EarthSpark: "Security Protocols" – Brad Meyer (supervising sound editor); Natalia Saavedra Brychcy (sound effects editor); Christine Gamache (dialogue editor); Carol Ma (foley editor) (Nickelodeon); Young Jedi Adventures: "The Young Jedi/Yoda's Mission" – Heather Olsen (sound effects editor); Robbi Smith (dialogue editor); David Bonilla (foley editor); John "J" Lampinen (foley artist) (Disney+)
Outstanding Achievement in Music Editing – Broadcast Long Form	Outstanding Achievement in Music Editing – Broadcast Short Form
**The Last of Us: "When You're Lost in the Darkness" – Maarten Hofmeijer (music editor) (HBO)**; Daisy Jones & the Six: "Track 8: Looks Like We Made It" – Amber Funk (supervising music editor); Mike Poole (music editor) (Prime Video); Fargo: "The Tiger" – Ben Schor (music editor) (FX); Loki: "Glorious Purpose" – Anele Onyekwere (supervising music editors); Nashia Wachsman, Richard Armstrong, Ed Hamilton (music editors) (Disney+); The Marvelous Mrs. Maisel: "Susan" – Annette Kudrak (lead music editor) (Prime Video); Ted Lasso: "Sunflowers" – Richard David Brown (lead music editor) (Apple TV+)	**Dave: "Met Gala" – Amber Funk (supervising music editor); James Sullivan (music editor) (Hulu)**; Beef: "The Great Fabricator" – Jason Tregoe Newman, Bryant J. Fuhrman, Andrew Ransom (music editors); Only Murders in the Building: "Opening Night" – Micha Liberman (music editor) (Hulu); The Bear: "Fishes" – Jason Lingle, Jeff Lingle (music editors) (FX)
Outstanding Achievement in Sound Editing – Non-Theatrical Documentary
**Our Planet II: "Chapter 3: The Next Generation" – George Fry (sound editor) (Netflix)**; 100 Foot Wave: "Lost at Sea" – Keith Hodne (supervising sound editor); Max Holland (dialogue editor); Eric Di Stefano, Kevin Senzaki (sound designers); Eli Akselrod, Mika Anami (sound effects editors) (HBO); David Attenborough's Conquest of the Skies – Oliver Kadel (supervising sound editor and sound designer) (Atlantic Productions); Formula 1: Drive to Survive: "Over the Limit" – Steve Speed, Nick Fry (supervising sound editors); Adam King, Doug Dreger (sound supervisors); Ivan Onek, James Spooner (sound designers) (Netflix); Waco: American Apocalypse: "In the Beginning..." – Trip Brock (supervising sound editor); Itai Levy (sound designer); Eric Gillingham, GW Pope, III (sound effects editors); Jackie Johnson (dialogue editor) (Netflix); World War II: From the Front Lines: "Turning Point" – Luke Hatfield (supervising sound editor); Sophie-Alice Davies (sound designer) (Netflix)

=== Video games ===
Outstanding Achievement in Sound Editing – Game Dialogue / ADR	Outstanding Achievement in Music Editing – Game Music
**Alan Wake 2 – Richard Lapington (audio director); Taneli Suoranta, Arthur Tisseront (senior dialogue designers)**; Call of Duty: Modern Warfare III – Matthew Grimm (audio director); David Swenson, Mikael Frithiof, Adam Boyd (supervising sound editors); Charles Deenen, Nick Martin (cinematics supervising sound editors); Dave Natale, Alexandria Kiser, Alvaro Vela (supervising dialogue editors); Eric Wedemeyer, Robbie Elias, Cameron Britton, Ian Mika, Collin Ayers (audio leads); Jomo Kangethe, Kyle Fraser (expert audio artists); Kegan Chau, Fernando Labarthe, Travis Didluck, Michael Tornabene, Peter Wayne, Dennis Bestafka, Scott Eckert, James McCawley, Lee Staples, Jasmine Jia, Ryan Garigliano, Shawn Jimmerson (senior audio artists); Tyler Cannan, Liam Underwood, Shawn Maldonado, Stephan Vankov, Pierce Cram, Dave Rowe, Brian Tuey, William Wise, Sunglae Park, Tommy Serioglou, Daniel Francis, Garrett Montgomery, Bryan O. Watkins (audio artists); Scott Cresswell (dialogue director); Andrew Giardino (senior dialogue editor); Don Veca (audio programmer); Samuel Hoffman, Michal Jaskuła, Daniel Granberg, Aaron Wolff, Alejandro Jaramillo, Sergio Jaskuła, Sebastian Martinez, Rafael Castaño, Andrew Rice, Austin Conway, Colette Dahanne, Gustavo Bruce, Hilary Long, Jacob Kinch, Terrence Vitali, Serge J. Isaac, Stefan Richter, Carlon Assells, Emilio Lopez-Centellas (dialogue editors); Marvel's Spider-Man 2 – Ryan Schaad, Benjamin Gendron-Smith (supervising dialogue designers); Karen Read (director and audio management); Jesse James Allen, Patrick Michalak (audio managers); Leilani Ramirez (senior manager and dialogue); Jaime Marcelo, Alyssa Galindo (senior dialogue designers); Phillip Kovats (senior director of sound); Harrison Deutsch (dialogue lead); Keith Asack (dialogue director); Daniel Davila, Evan Hodick, Matthew Strasser, Michelangelo Muscariello, Mitchell Kenney, Tyler Held, Emma Burlingame, Rory Given (dialogue designers); Glen Gathard, Luke Duffin, Dionne Wong, Eugene Tong Haw Cheng, Huberth Varela, Harry Watchman, Robert Kubicki (dialogue editors); Star Wars Jedi: Survivor – Harrison Deutsch (dialogue lead); Nick Friedemann (senior dialogue editor)	**Star Wars Jedi: Survivor – Nick Laviers (music director); Colin Andrew Grant, Andrew Karboski (music implementers)**; Alan Wake 2 – Richard Lapington (audio director); Koca Kastavarac (sound designer); Kilian Oser (music editor); Dobrivoje Milijanovic (senior sound designer); Diablo IV – Kris Giampa (audio director); Derek Duke (music director); John Kurlander (scoring director); Marvel's Spider-Man 2 – Rob Goodson (music editor); Scott Bergstrom, Ted Kocher, Tao-Ping Chen, Nicholas Mastroianni, Monty Mudd, Andrew Buresh, Sonia Coronado, Paul Thomason, Julie McLaughlin, Yuen Man Chung Kelvin, Matthew Kelly, Seira McCarthy, Sam McCormick, Cherron Arens (music editors)
Outstanding Achievement in Sound Editing – Game Effects / Foley
**Marvel's Spider-Man 2 – Ben Minto, Chris Sweetman, Csaba Wagner MPSE, Samuel Justice, Gary Miranda (supervising sound editors); Emile Mika (supervising sound designer); Phillip Kovats (senior director of sound); Karen Read (director and audio management); Daniel Birczynski, Jesse James Allen (audio managers); Jeremie Voillot (director of sound design); Paul Mudra, Jerry Berlongieri, Dwight Okahara (senior audio directors); Ben Pantelis, Sebastian Ruiz, Nick Jackson, Enoch Choi, Cameron Sonju, Gavin Booth (technical sound designers); Blake Johnson (lead sound designer); Eddie Pacheco MPSE, Tyler Cornett, Johannes Hammers, Zack Bogucki, Alex Previty, Matt Ryan, Juliet Rascon, Andres Herrera, Robert Castro, Jeff Darby, Beau Anthony Jimenez MPSE, Derrick Espino, Jon Rook (senior sound designers); Tyler Hoffman, Daniele Carli, Bob Kellough MPSE, Bryan Jerden, Eilam Hoffman, Graham Donnelly MPSE, Jason W. Jennings MPSE, Matt Hall, Michael Leaning, Michael Schapiro, Randy Torres, Richard Gould, Stephano Sanchinelli, Tim Walston MPSE, Tobias Poppe, Tom Jaine MPSE, Jeremy Neroes, Adam Sanchez, Brendan Wolf, Roy Lancaster, Rodrigo Robinet, Daniel Barboza, Charlie Ritter, David Goll, Chris Kokkinos MPSE, TJ Schauer (sound designers); Blake Collins, Annie Taylor, Austin Creek (foley editors); Joanna Fang (foley artist)**; Alan Wake 2 – Richard Lapington (audio director); Tazio Schiesari (principal audio designer); Gulli Gunnarsson, Thomas Holmes (senior audio designers); Joshua Adam Bell (senior technical audio designer); Call of Duty: Modern Warfare III – Matthew Grimm (audio director); Eric Wedemeyer, Robbie Elias, Cameron Britton, Ian Mika, Dave Rowe, Brian Tuey, Collin Ayers (audio leads); David Swenson, Mikael Frithiof, Adam Boyd (supervising sound editors); Charles Deenen, Nick Martin (cinematics supervising sound editors); Kelly Baffoni, Landen Belardes, Gregory Bonini, Tom Brewer, Alexander Ephraim, James Evans, Tim Gedemer, Mark Jasper, Sean Madsen, James Miller, Josh More, Myron Nettinga, Ryan Nowak, Travis Prater, Alec Rubay, John Sawa, Matt Severin, Carlos Solis, Nick Spradlin, Conrad Ytuarte, Jessica Arkoff (sound designers); Jomo Kangethe, Kyle Fraser (expert audio artists); Kegan Chau, Fernando Labarthe, Travis Didluck, Michael Tornabene, Peter Wayne, Dennis Bestafka, Scott Eckert, James McCawley, Lee Staples, Jasmine Jia, Ryan Garigliano, Shawn Jimmerson (senior audio artists); Tyler Cannan, Liam Underwood, Stephan Vankov, Pierce Cram, Shawn Maldonado, William Wise, Sunglae Park, Tommy Serioglou, Daniel Francis, Garrett Montgomery, Bryan O. Watkins (audio artists); Don Veca (audio programmer); Star Wars Jedi: Survivor – Nick von Kaenel (audio director); Alex Barnhart, Oscar Coen (senior sound designers); Ashton Faydenko (sound designer); Kartika Dewi Luky (associate sound designer); Tom Jaine (senior cinematic sound designer); Tori Ano (sound implementer)

=== Student film ===
Outstanding Achievement in Sound Editing – Student Film (Verna Fields Award)
- **Dive (National Film and Television School) – Simon Panayi (supervising sound editor)**
  - Buyers Beware (Savannah College of Art and Design) – Matt Lemberger (supervising sound editor)
  - Canary (Chapman University) – Mengchen Sun (supervising sound editor)
  - From the Top (National Film and Television School) – Etienne Kompis (supervising sound editor)
  - Gossip (National Film and Television School) – Itzel Gonzalez Estrada (supervising sound editor)
  - Heimen (Amsterdam University of the Arts) – Eran Brinkman (supervising sound editor); Sam Titshof (sound effects editor)
  - The Tornado Outside (National Film and Television School) – Marios Themistokleous (supervising sound editor)
  - Tree of Many Faces (National Film and Television School) – Siim Skepast (sound designer)
