= List of accolades received by The Trial of the Chicago 7 =

The Trial of the Chicago 7 awards and nominations
Awards and nominations
Award	Wins	Nominations
Golden Globe	1	5
Academy Awards	0	6
BAFTA Awards	0	3
Screen Actors Guild Awards	1	3

The Trial of the Chicago 7 is an historical legal drama written and directed by Aaron Sorkin. The film follows the Chicago Seven, a group of anti–Vietnam War protesters charged with conspiracy and crossing state lines with the intention of inciting riots at the 1968 Democratic National Convention in Chicago. The Group was originally the Chicago 8 with Bobby Seale being played by Yahya Abdul-Mateen II at the start of the trial. The rest of the Seven defendants were portrayed by Eddie Redmayne, Sacha Baron Cohen, Jeremy Strong, John Carroll Lynch, Alex Sharp, Noah Robbins, and Daniel Flaherty. The ensemble cast includes Joseph Gordon-Levitt, Mark Rylance, Frank Langella, and Michael Keaton,

The film received six Academy Award nominations, including Best Picture, Best Supporting Actor for Sacha Baron Cohen, and Best Original Screenplay for Aaron Sorkin. The film also received 3 British Academy Film Awards nominations, 5 Golden Globes Awards nominations, and 3 Screen Actors Guild Award nominations.

== Major associations ==
=== Academy Awards ===
Year	Category	Recipient(s)	Result	Ref.
2020	Best Picture	Marc Platt and Stuart Besser	Nominated	
2020	Best Supporting Actor	Sacha Baron Cohen	Nominated	
2020	Best Original Screenplay	Aaron Sorkin	Nominated	
2020	Best Cinematography	Phedon Papamichael	Nominated	
2020	Best Film Editing	Alan Baumgarten	Nominated	
2020	Best Original Song	"Hear My Voice" – Daniel Pemberton and Celeste Waite	Nominated	

=== British Academy Film Awards ===
Year	Category	Recipient(s)	Result	Ref.
2020	Best Film	Stuart M. Besser and Marc Platt	Nominated	
2020	Best Original Screenplay	Aaron Sorkin	Nominated	
2020	Best Editing	Alan Baumgarten	Nominated	

=== Directors Guild of America Awards ===
Year	Category	Recipient(s)	Result	Ref.
2020	Outstanding Directional Achievement in Feature Film	Aaron Sorkin	Nominated	

=== Golden Globe Awards ===
Year	Category	Recipient(s)	Result	Ref.
2020	Best Motion Picture – Drama		Nominated	
2020	Best Supporting Actor	Sacha Baron Cohen	Nominated	
2020	Best Director	Aaron Sorkin	Nominated	
2020	Best Screenplay	Aaron Sorkin	Won	
2020	Best Original Song	Daniel Pemberton & Celeste for "Hear My Voice"	Nominated	

=== Producers Guild of America Awards ===
Year	Category	Recipient(s)	Result	Ref.
2020	Outstanding Producer of Theatrical Motion Pictures	Marc Platt and Stuart M. Besser	Nominated	

=== Screen Actors Guild Awards ===
Year	Category	Recipient(s)	Result	Ref.
2020	Outstanding Performance by a Cast in a Motion Picture	Yahya Abdul-Mateen II, Sacha Baron Cohen, Joseph Gordon-Levitt, Michael Keaton, Frank Langella, Kelvin Harrison Jr. John Carroll Lynch; Eddie Redmayne, Mark Rylance, Alex Sharp, Jeremy Strong	Won	
2020	Outstanding Performance by a Male Actor in a Supporting Role	Sacha Baron Cohen	Nominated	
2020	Outstanding Performance by a Stunt Ensemble in a Motion Picture	The Stunt Performers of The Trial of the Chicago 7	Nominated	

=== Writers Guild of America Awards ===
Year	Category	Recipient(s)	Result	Ref.
2020	Best Original Screenplay	Aaron Sorkin	Nominated	

== Critics awards ==
=== Chicago Film Critics Association ===
Year	Category	Recipient(s)	Result	Ref.
2020	Best Original Screenplay	Aaron Sorkin	Nominated	
2020	Best Editing	Alan Baumgarten	Nominated	

=== Critics' Choice Awards ===
Year	Category	Recipient(s)	Result	Ref.
2020	Best Picture		Nominated	
2020	Best Director	Aaron Sorkin	Nominated	
2020	Best Original Screenplay	Aaron Sorkin	Nominated	
2020	Best Supporting Actor	Sacha Baron Cohen	Nominated	
2020	Best Acting Ensemble	The Cast of The Trial of the Chicago 7	Won	
2020	Best Editing	Alan Baumgarten	Won	

=== Detroit Film Critics Society ===
Year	Category	Recipient(s)	Result	Ref.
2021	Best Picture		Nominated	
2021	Best Director	Aaron Sorkin	Nominated	
2021	Best Original Screenplay	Aaron Sorkin	Nominated	
2021	Best Supporting Actor	Sacha Baron Cohen	Nominated	
2021	Best Ensemble	The cast of The Trial of the Chicago 7	Nominated	

=== Hollywood Critics Association ===
Year	Category	Recipient(s)	Result	Ref.
2021	Best Picture		Nominated	
2021	Best Screenplay	Aaron Sorkin	Nominated	
2021	Best Cast Ensemble		Nominated	
2021	Best Editing	Alan Baumgarten	Won	

=== Houston Film Critics Society ===
Year	Category	Recipient(s)	Result	Ref.
2020	Best Picture		Nominated	
2020	Best Director	Aaron Sorkin	Nominated	
2020	Best Screenplay	Aaron Sorkin	Nominated	
2020	Best Supporting Actor	Sacha Baron Cohen	Nominated	

=== London Film Critics' Circle ===
Year	Category	Recipient(s)	Result	Ref.
2020	Screenwriter of the Year	Aaron Sorkin	Nominated	
2020	Supporting Actor of the Year	Sacha Baron Cohen	Nominated	

=== Online Film Critics Society ===
Year	Category	Recipient(s)	Result	Ref.
2020	Best Picture		Nominated	
2020	Best Supporting Actor	Sacha Baron Cohen	Nominated	
2020	Best Original Screenplay	Aaron Sorkin	Nominated	
2020	Best Editing	Alan Baumgarten	Nominated	

=== San Diego Film Critics Society ===
Year	Category	Recipient(s)	Result	Ref.
2020	Best Director	Aaron Sorkin	Runner-up	
2020	Best Original Screenplay	Aaron Sorkin	Runner-up	
2020	Best Supporting Actor	Sacha Baron Cohen	Nominated	
2020	Best Ensemble	The Cast of The Trial Of The Chicago 7	Runner-up	
2020	Best Editing	Alan Baumgarten	Runner-up	

=== San Francisco Bay Area Film Critics Circle ===
Year	Category	Recipient(s)	Result	Ref.
2020	Best Supporting Actor	Sacha Baron Cohen	Nominated	
2020	Best Original Screenplay	Aaron Sorkin	Nominated	
2020	Best Editing	Alan Baumgarten	Won	

=== Seattle Film Critics Society ===
Year	Category	Recipient(s)	Result	Ref.
2020	Best Supporting Actor	Sacha Baron Cohen	Nominated	
2020	Best Villain	Frank Langella	Nominated	

=== St. Louis Film Critics Association ===
Year	Category	Recipient(s)	Result	Ref.
2020	Best Film		Nominated	
2020	Best Director	Aaron Sorkin	Nominated	
2020	Best Original Screenplay	Aaron Sorkin	Nominated	
2020	Best Supporting Actor	Sacha Baron Cohen	Nominated	
2020	Best Editing	Alan Baumgarten	Nominated	

=== Vancouver Film Critics Circle ===
Year	Category	Recipient(s)	Result	Ref.
2020	Best Supporting Actor	Sacha Baron Cohen	Nominated	
2020	Best Screenplay	Aaron Sorkin	Won	

=== Washington D.C. Area Film Critics Association ===
Year	Category	Recipient(s)	Result	Ref.
2020	Best Supporting Actor	Sacha Baron Cohen	Nominated	
2020	Best Original Screenplay	Aaron Sorkin	Nominated	
2020	Best Editing	Alan Baumgarten	Nominated	
2020	Best Acting Ensemble		Nominated	

== Miscellaneous awards ==
Year	Award	Category	Recipient(s)	Result	Ref.
2020	AACTA International Awards	Best International Film		Nominated	
2020	AACTA International Awards	Best International Direction	Aaron Sorkin	Nominated	
2020	AACTA International Awards	Best International Supporting Actor	Sacha Baron Cohen	Won	
2020	AACTA International Awards	Best International Screenplay	Aaron Sorkin	Won	
2020	ACE Eddie Awards	Best Edited Feature Film – Dramatic	Alan Baumgarten	Won	
2020	Alliance of Women Film Journalists	Best Picture		Won	
2020	Alliance of Women Film Journalists	Best Director	Aaron Sorkin	Nominated	
2020	Alliance of Women Film Journalists	Best Writing, Original Screenplay	Aaron Sorkin	Nominated	
2020	Alliance of Women Film Journalists	Best Supporting Actor	Sacha Baron Cohen	Nominated	
2020	Alliance of Women Film Journalists	Best Ensemble Cast	Francine Maisler	Won	
2020	Alliance of Women Film Journalists	Best Film Editing	Alan Baumgarten	Nominated	
2020	American Film Institute Awards	Top 10 Movies of the Year		Won	
2020	American Society of Cinematographers Awards	Outstanding Achievement in Cinematography in Theatrical Releases	Phedon Papamichael	Nominated	
2020	Artios Awards	Feature Big Budget – Drama	Francine Maisler, Mia Cusumano, Jennifer Rudnicke, Mickie Pascal, Kathy Driscoll-Mohler, Molly Rose and AJ Links	Won	
2020	Art Directors Guild Awards	Excellence in Production Design for a Period Film	Shane Valentino	Nominated	
2020	Black Reel Awards	Outstanding Breakthrough Performance, Male	Yahya Abdul-Mateen II	Nominated	
2020	Cinema Audio Society Awards	Outstanding Achievement in Sound Mixing for a Motion Picture – Live Action	Thomas Varga, Julian Slater, Michael Babcock, Daniel Pemberton, Justin W. Walker and Kevin Schultz	Nominated	
2020	Golden Reel Awards	Outstanding Sound Editing – Feature Underscore	Allegra de Souza	Nominated	
2020	Golden Reel Awards	Outstanding Sound Editing – Dialogue / ADR - Feature Film	Renée Tondelli, Michael Hertlein, Jon Michaels and Jeena Schoenke	Won	
2021	Hollywood Music in Media Awards	Best Original Score in a Feature Film	Daniel Pemberton	Nominated	
2021	Hollywood Music in Media Awards	Best Original Song in a Feature Film	"Hear My Voice" – Daniel Pemberton and Celeste Waite	Nominated	
2020	IGN Awards	Best Movie of the Year 2020		Nominated	
2020	IGN Awards	Best Movie Director in 2020	Aaron Sorkin	Nominated	
2020	IGN Awards	Best Movie Ensemble in 2020		Nominated	
2020	IGN Awards	Best Drama Movie of 2020		Won	
2021	MTV Movie & TV Awards	Best Performance in a Movie	Sacha Baron Cohen	Nominated	
2020	Satellite Awards	Best Motion Picture – Drama		Nominated	
2020	Satellite Awards	Best Director	Aaron Sorkin	Nominated	
2020	Satellite Awards	Best Original Screenplay	Aaron Sorkin	Nominated	
2020	Satellite Awards	Best Supporting Actor – Motion Picture	Sacha Baron Cohen	Nominated	
2020	Satellite Awards	Best Film Editing	Alan Baumgarten	Won	
2020	Satellite Awards	Best Original Song	"Hear My Voice" – Daniel Pemberton and Celeste Waite	Nominated	
2021	Set Decorators Society of America Awards	Best Achievement in Décor/Design of a Period Feature Film	Andrew Baseman and Shane Valentino	Nominated	
