= Sean McCormack (disambiguation) =

Sean McCormack is a former United States Assistant Secretary of State.

Sean or Shaun McCormack may refer to:

- Sean McCormack (Gaelic footballer)
- Sean McCormack (sound editor)
- Shaun McCormack, biographer of Cool Papa Bell
