= Paul N. J. Ottosson =

Swedish sound engineer

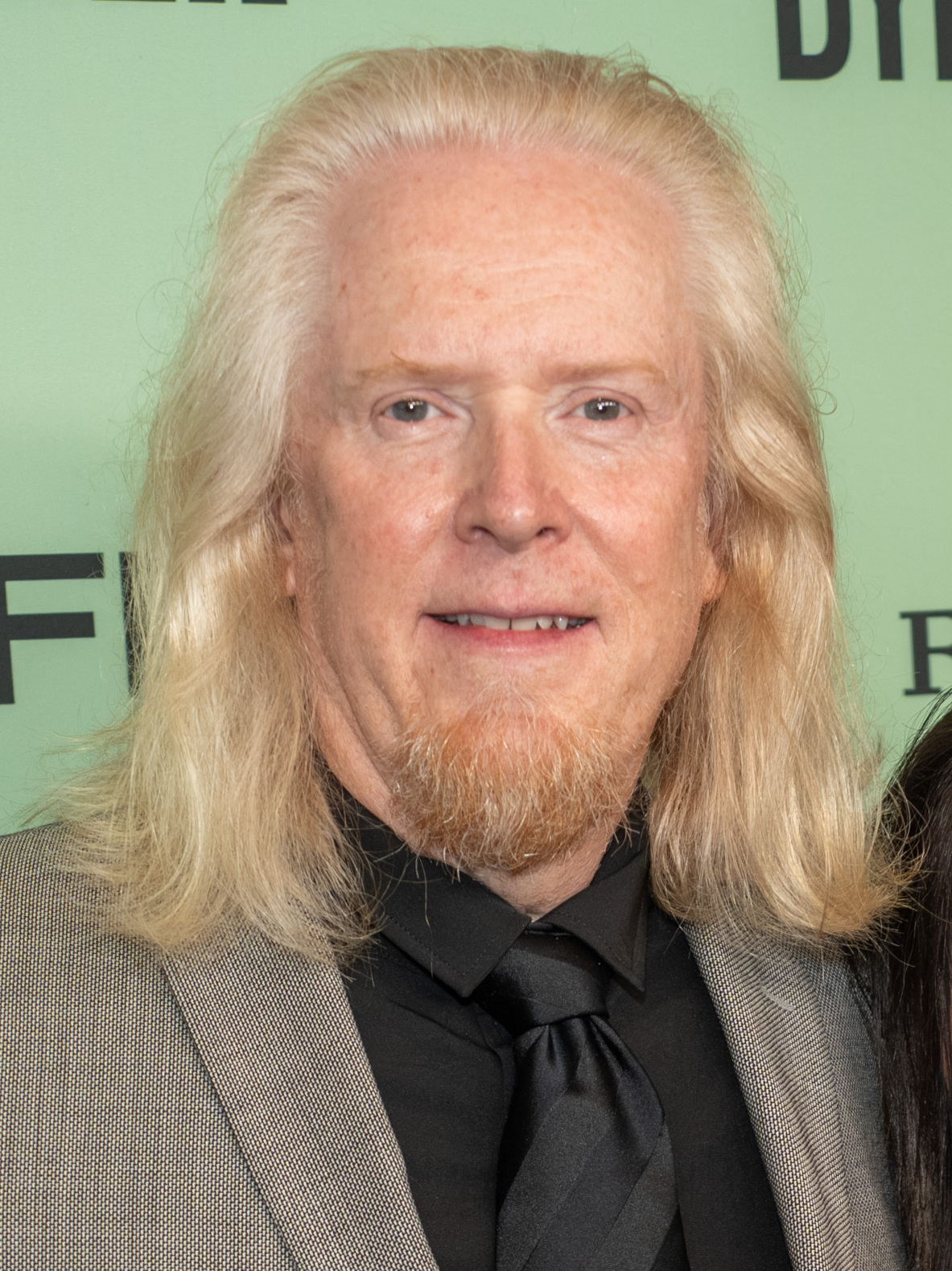
- Ottosson in 2025
- Born: Nils Jörgen Paul Ottosson; 25 February 1966 (age 60); Lönsboda, Skåne län, Sweden
- Occupation: Sound Designer
- Years active: 1995–present

Paul N. J. Ottosson (born 25 February 1966) is a Swedish sound designer. The recipient of numerous accolades, including three Academy Awards, a BAFTA Award, and a Primetime Emmy Award, he has worked on more than 130 films since 1995.

== Selected filmography ==
- Uncharted (2022)
- The Boss Baby: Family Business (2021)
- Bloodshot (2020)
- A Series of Unfortunate Events (2017-2019)
- The Boss Baby (2017)
- Detroit (2017)
- Independence Day: Resurgence (2016)
- Penguins of Madagascar (2014)
- Fury (2014)
- White House Down (2013)
- Zero Dark Thirty (2012)
- Men in Black 3 (2012)
- Battle: Los Angeles (2011)
- 2012 (2009)
- Terminator Salvation (2009)
- The Hurt Locker (2008)
- Spider-Man 3 (2007)
- Spider-Man 2 (2004)
- The Dentist 2 (1998)

== Accolades ==
Award	Date of ceremony	Category	Film	Result	Ref
Academy Awards	27 February 2005	Best Sound Editing	Spider-Man 2	Nominated	
Academy Awards	7 March 2010	Best Sound Editing	The Hurt Locker	Won	
Academy Awards	7 March 2010	Best Sound Mixing	The Hurt Locker	Won^{A}	
Academy Awards	24 February 2013	Best Sound Editing	Zero Dark Thirty	Won^{B}	
British Academy Film Awards	12 February 2005	Best Sound	Spider-Man 2	Nominated^{C}	
British Academy Film Awards	21 February 2010	Best Sound	The Hurt Locker	Won^{A}	
Cinema Audio Society Awards	February 27, 2010	Best Sound Mixing for Motion Pictures	The Hurt Locker	Won^{A}	
Cinema Audio Society Awards	18 February 2013	Best Sound Mixing for Motion Pictures - Live Action	Zero Dark Thirty	Nominated^{D}	
Cinema Audio Society Awards	February 14, 2015	Best Sound Mixing for a Motion Picture – Animated	Penguins of Madagascar	Nominated^{E}	
Golden Reel Awards	2001	Best Sound Editing - Television Movies and Specials - Effects & Foley	Operation Sandman	Nominated^{F}	
Golden Reel Awards	23 March 2002	Best Sound Editing - Animated Feature Film, Domestic and Foreign	Jimmy Neutron: Boy Genius	Nominated^{G}	
Golden Reel Awards	1 March 2005	Best Sound Editing in Domestic Features - Sound Effects & Foley	Spider-Man 2	Nominated^{H}	
Golden Reel Awards	2008	Best Sound Editing - Sound Effects and Foley for Feature Film	Spider-Man 3	Nominated^{I}	
Golden Reel Awards	20 February 2010	Best Sound Editing - Dialogue and ADR in a Feature Film	The Hurt Locker	Nominated^{J}	
Golden Reel Awards	20 February 2010	Best Sound Editing - Best Sound Editing - Sound Effects and Foley in a Feature Film	The Hurt Locker	Nominated^{K}	
Golden Reel Awards	20 February 2010	Best Sound Editing - Best Sound Editing - Sound Effects and Foley in a Feature Film	2012	Nominated^{L}	
Golden Reel Awards	15 February 2015	Best Sound Editing - Sound Effects and Foley in an English Language Feature	Fury	Nominated^{M}	
Golden Reel Awards	18 February 2018	Best Sound Editing - Dialogue and ADR for Feature Film	Detroit	Nominated^{N}	
Primetime Emmy Award	13 September 1998	Outstanding Sound Editing in Non-Fiction Program	Rat	Won^{0}	
Satellite Awards	23 January 2005	Best Sound	Spider-Man 2	Nominated^{P}	
Satellite Awards	20 December 2009	Best Sound	2012	Won^{Q}	

== Notes ==
- ^A — Won with Ray Beckett.
- ^B — Tied with Per Hallberg and Karen Baker Landers for Skyfall.
- ^C — With Kevin O'Connell, Greg P. Russell and Jeffrey J. Haboush.
- ^D — With Ray Beckett, Sam Okell, Brian Smith and John Sanacore.
- ^E — With Tighe Sheldon, Dennis S. Sands and Randy Singer.
- ^F — With Robert Webber, Bill Bell, Suzanne Angel, Adriane Marfiak, Bob Costanza, Richard S. Steele, Joy Ealy, Anton Holden, Scott Kolden, Tim Terusa, Michael Lyle and Les Wolf.
- ^G — With Christopher T. Welch, Scott Curtis, Michael Jonascu, David Grimaldi, Steve Tushar, Chuck Michael, Beth Sterner, Julie Feiner, Tammy Fearing, Carol Lewis, Matthew Harrison and Fred Burke.
- ^H — With Christopher Flick, Scott G.G. Haller, Reuben Simon, Jussi Tegelman, Lisa Hannan, Ai-Ling Lee, Martin Lopez and Bernard Weiser.
- ^I — With Joseph Bonn, Chris M. Jacobson, Jussi Tegelman, Bernard Weiser, Greg ten Bosch, Scott Curtis, Christopher Flick, Gary A. Hecker and Michael Broomberg.
- ^J — With Robert Troy, Kimberly Harris and Judah Getz.
- ^K — With Jamie Hardt, Chris M. Jacobson, Bernard Weiser, Ryan Juggler, Richard C. Franklin and Alex Ullrich.
- ^L — With Mark Pappas, Jamie Hardt, Bernard Weiser, Ai-Ling Lee, Angelo Palazzo, Thom Brennan, Lee Gilmore, Gary A. Hecker and Michael Broomberg.
- ^M — With Mark Pappas, Gary A. Hecker, Rick Owens, Jamie Hardt, Lee Gilmore, Hamilton Sterling, Bruce Tanis, Jonathan Klein, Scott Curtis and Ryan Juggler.
- ^N — With Daniel Saxlid, Laura Graham and Robert Troy.
- ^O — Won alongside Patrick M. Griffith and Lisa Hannan.
- ^P — With Susan Dudeck, Joseph Geisinger, Jeffrey J. Haboush, Kevin O'Connell and Greg P. Russell.
- ^Q — Won alongside Jeffrey J. Haboush, Michael Keller, Rick Kline and Michael McGee.
