= Tondelli =

Tondelli is a surname. Notable people with the surname include:

- Pier Vittorio Tondelli (1955–1991), Italian writer
- Renée Tondelli, American supervising sound editor
