= James Harrison (sound editor) =

British sound editor

- Born: James Harrison; March 24, 1976 (age 49); Chichester, U.K.
- Occupation: Supervising Sound Editor / Designer
- Years active: 1999–present

James Harrison is a British sound editor. He was nominated for an Academy Award in the category Best Sound for the film No Time to Die.

== Selected filmography ==
- No Time to Die (2021; co-nominated with Simon Hayes, Oliver Tarney, Paul Massey and Mark Taylor)
