= Rachael Tate =

British sound editor

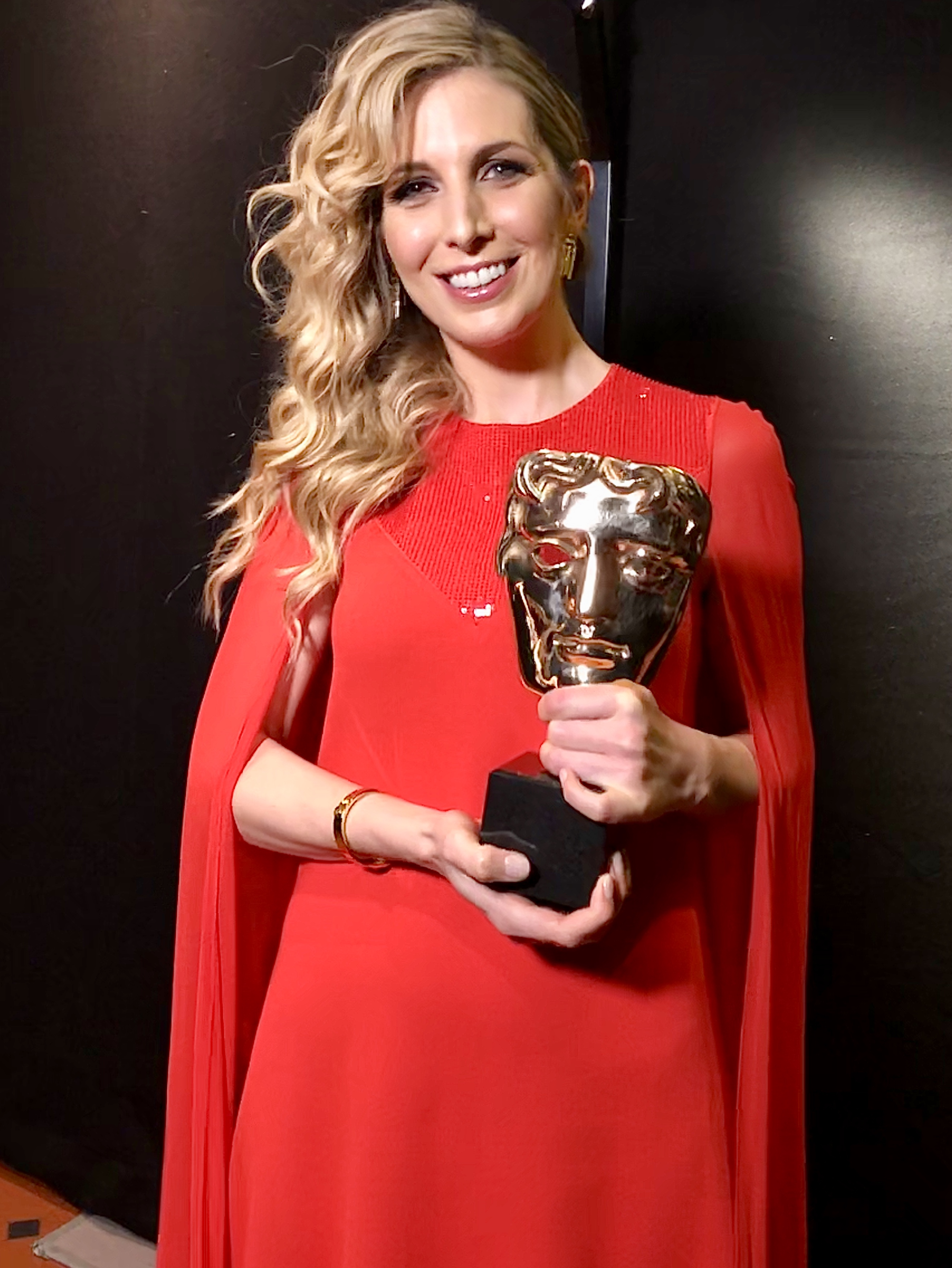
- Tate at the BAFTA Film Awards in 2020
- Occupation: Sound editor
- Known for: 1917

Rachael Tate is a British sound editor in the film industry. She was nominated for an Academy Award and won a BAFTA Award for Best Sound for her work on the 2019 film 1917.

== Career ==
Tate is a supervising sound editor, her most recent credits including 'The Lost Bus', 'Thirteen Lives' and 'The Outfit'. She started out as an ADR Recordist at De Lane Lea Studios in London before going on to edit dialogue and ADR for feature films such as The Martian, Alien: Covenant and Jason Bourne. Tate won a BAFTA Award for her work on 1917, for which she also received an Academy Award nomination and an MPSE Golden Reel for Best Dialogue & ADR in a Feature Film.

Rachael is a supporter of Primetime, a vetted visibility platform campaigning for gender equality across every department within the entertainment industry.

== Awards and nominations ==
=== Academy Awards ===
- 2020: 1917 (Academy Award for Best Sound Editing) - Nominated

=== BAFTA Awards ===
- 2020: 1917 (BAFTA Award for Best Sound) - Winner

=== Motion Picture Sound Editors - Golden Reel Awards ===
- 2024: Napoleon (Best Dialogue and ADR in a Feature Film) - Nominated
- 2023: Empire of Light (Best Dialogue and ADR in a Feature Film) - Nominated
- 2022: No Time to Die (Best Dialogue and ADR in a Feature Film) - Nominated
- 2021: News of the World (Best Dialogue and ADR in a Feature Film) - Nominated
- 2020: 1917 (Best Dialogue and ADR in a Feature Film) - Winner
- 2020: Battle at Big Rock (Outstanding Achievement in Sound Editing - Sound Effects, Foley, Music, Dialogue and ADR for Live Action Broadcast Media Under 35 Minutes) - Nominated
- 2016: The Martian (Best Dialogue and ADR in a Feature Film) - Nominated

=== AMPS Awards ===
- 2021: News of the World (Excellence in Sound for a Feature Film) - Nominated
- 2020: 1917 (Excellence in Sound for a Feature Film) - Winner

=== ISFMF Awards ===
- 2020: 1917 (Best Sound Editing) - Winner

=== MCFCA Awards ===
- 2020: 1917 (Best Sound) - Winner

=== ACCA Awards ===
- 2019: 1917 (Best Sound) - Winner
