= Flatliners =

1990 film by Joel Schumacher

- Theatrical release poster by John Alvin
- Directed by: Joel Schumacher
- Written by: Peter Filardi
- Produced by: Michael Douglas; Rick Bieber
- Starring: Kiefer Sutherland; Julia Roberts; William Baldwin; Oliver Platt; Kevin Bacon
- Cinematography: Jan de Bont
- Edited by: Robert Brown
- Music by: James Newton Howard
- Production company: Stonebridge Entertainment
- Distributed by: Columbia Pictures
- Release date: August 10, 1990 (United States)
- Running time: 114 minutes
- Country: United States
- Language: English
- Budget: $26 million
- Box office: $61.5 million

Flatliners is a 1990 American science fiction psychological horror film directed by Joel Schumacher, produced by Michael Douglas and Rick Bieber, and written by Peter Filardi. It stars Kiefer Sutherland, Julia Roberts, William Baldwin, Oliver Platt, and Kevin Bacon. The film is about five medical students who attempt to find out what lies beyond death by conducting clandestine experiments that produce near-death experiences. The film was shot on the campus of Loyola University Chicago between October 1989 and January 1990, and was nominated for an Academy Award for Best Sound Editing in 1990 (Charles L. Campbell and Richard C. Franklin). The film was theatrically released on August 10, 1990, by Columbia Pictures. It grossed $61 million at the box office.

A follow-up film directed by Danish filmmaker Niels Arden Oplev was released in September 2017, also featuring Sutherland in a starring role. (Note: A deleted scene in Flatliners (2017) establishes Sutherland's character "Dr. Barry Wolfson" being an older version of Dr. Nelson Wright from the 1990 film, having since changed his name.)

== Plot ==
Medical student Nelson Wright convinces classmates Joe Hurley, David Labraccio, Rachel Manus, and Randy Steckle to help him discover what lies beyond death. Nelson flatlines for one minute before his classmates resuscitate him. While "dead", he sees a boy he bullied as a child, Billy Mahoney. He merely tells his friends that he cannot describe what he saw, but something is there. The others follow Nelson's feat.

Joe flatlines next and experiences an erotic sequence linked to his promiscuous lifestyle. After arguing with Rachel and out-bidding her of the length of time that they are willing to remain “dead”, David is third to flatline on Halloween and sees a girl, Winnie Hicks, whom he bullied in grade school.

The three men later start to experience hallucinations related to their visions. Nelson gets physically assaulted by Billy Mahoney twice. Joe, engaged to be married, is haunted by the women that he secretly videotaped during his sexual dalliances, who taunt him with the same false promises he used on them. On a train, David is confronted by the 8-year-old Winnie, who taunts him the way he taunted her.

Rachel decides to flatline next. David rushes in, intending to stop the others from giving her their same fate, but arrives too late. Rachel nearly dies when the power goes out and the men cannot shock her with defibrillator paddles. She survives, but she too is haunted by the memory of her father dying by suicide when she was young.

The three men reveal their harrowing experiences to one another, and David decides to put a stop to his visions. Meanwhile, Joe's fiancée, Anne, comes to his apartment and, having discovered his videos, ends their relationship. Joe's visions cease after Anne leaves him.

David goes to visit a now adult Winnie and apologizes. She accepts his apology and thanks him, who feels a weight lifted off his shoulders. David then finds Nelson, who accompanied him to visit Winnie, beating himself with an axe. In Nelson's mind, Billy is again attempting to beat him to death. David stops him, and they return to town, where Rachel confronts Nelson about withholding the supernatural nature of the experiments from the rest of them, then storms off. David later instructs Joe and Randy to help Nelson find Billy.

Having an idea of what Rachel has experienced, David offers to let her stay with him and they fall asleep together. Meanwhile, Nelson takes Randy and Joe to a graveyard. He killed Billy as a kid by throwing rocks until he fell out of a tree. They try to convince Nelson that what he did was accidental, but he does not listen. They are eventually stranded when Nelson storms off in Joe's Mustang.

David leaves Rachel to rescue Joe and Randy at the cemetery. While alone, she goes to the bathroom and finds her father. He apologizes to Rachel, whose guilt over his death is lifted after he reveals he was addicted to morphine and his suicide was related to post-traumatic stress disorder resulting from his tour in Vietnam. Nelson calls David's house, and when Rachel answers he tells her he needs to flatline again to make amends. He apologizes for involving her and their friends in his reckless plan.

The three men realize what he intends and race to stop Nelson, who has been dead for nine minutes when they arrive. Together with Rachel, the four friends work to save him. In the afterlife, the boy Nelson is in the tree being stoned by Billy from the ground and dies from the subsequent fall. When almost all his friends are about to give up on reviving Nelson, Billy forgives him. David gives Nelson one last shock, which brings him back.

== Cast ==
- Kiefer Sutherland as Nelson Wright
  - Aeryk Egan as Young Nelson
- Julia Roberts as Rachel Manus
- Kevin Bacon as David Labraccio
  - John Joseph Duda as Young David
- William Baldwin as Joe Hurley
- Oliver Platt as Randy Steckle
- Kimberly Scott as Winnie Hicks
  - Kesha Reed as Young Winnie
- Joshua Rudoy as Billy Mahoney
- Benjamin Mouton as Jack Manus
- Hope Davis as Anne Coldren
- Patricia Belcher as Edna
- Beth Grant as Housewife

== Release ==
Columbia Pictures released Flatliners theatrically on August 10, 1990. The film debuted at number 1 at the US box office, grossing $10 million on its opening weekend. It grossed $61.5 million total in the United States.

== Reception ==
The review aggregator Rotten Tomatoes reports that 50% of critics give the film a positive review based on 54 reviews, with the critical consensus "While it boasts an impressive cast, striking visuals, and an effective mood, Flatliners never quite jolts its story to life." On Metacritic, which assigns a weighted average rating to reviews, the film has a score 55 out of 100, based on 10 critics, indicating "mixed or average" reviews. Audiences polled by CinemaScore gave the film an average grade of "B+" on an A+ to F scale.

In her review for The New York Times, Caryn James wrote, "when taken on its own stylish terms, Flatliners is greatly entertaining. Viewers are likely to go along with this film instantly or else ridicule it to death. Its atmospheric approach doesn't admit much middle ground." Critic Roger Ebert praised the film as "an original, intelligent thriller, well-directed by Joel Schumacher" and called the cast "talented young actors, [who] inhabit the shadows with the right mixture of intensity, fear and cockiness". But Ebert criticized Flatliners for "plot manipulation that is unworthy of the brilliance of its theme. I only wish it had been restructured so we didn't need to go through the same crisis so many times." Similarly, Peter Travers of Rolling Stone magazine praised the film's young stars, but complained that "by dodging the questions it raises about life after death, Flatliners ends up tripping on timidity. It's a movie about daring that dares nothing."

Entertainment Weekly gave the film a "D" rating and Owen Gleiberman wrote, "What isn't in evidence is the sort of overheated lunacy that made the William Hurt speed-freak trip movie Altered States (1980) such delectable trash. Flatliners is camp, but of a very low order. Schumacher is too intent on pandering to the youth market to take the mad risks and plunges that make for a scintillating bad movie." In contrast, The Washington Post's Rita Kempley loved the film, calling it: "a heart-stopping, breathtakingly sumptuous haunted house of a movie". The film has become a cult film. Matt Zoller Seitz, in his review of the 2017 remake, described the 1990 original as a "gothic self-help drama".

== Soundtrack ==
- "Party Town" – Written and performed by Dave Stewart and the Spiritual Cowboys
- "The Clapping Song" – Written by Lincoln Chase

== Follow-up ==
On October 5, 2015, a follow-up starring Elliot Page and Diego Luna was announced, following the casting of Nina Dobrev, James Norton and Kiersey Clemons. Kiefer Sutherland also appears in the remake. Sutherland had originally announced that he was reprising his role as Nelson Wright, revealing that the new film would actually be a sequel rather than a remake. However, upon release, Sutherland's character is identified as Barry Wolfson; a deleted scene indicates Sutherland is in fact playing the same character, living under a new identity. Directed by Danish filmmaker Niels Arden Oplev, it was released on September 29, 2017.

== See also ==
- A Thousand Deaths
