= Mildred Iatrou Morgan =

American sound editor and audio engineer

Mildred Iatrou Morgan is an American sound editor and audio engineer. She is of Greek descent.

== Work ==
Some of her works include:

- The Fast and the Furious (2001)
- Catch Me If You Can (2002)
- Antwone Fisher (2002)
- Sinbad: Legend of the Seven Seas (2003)
- The Terminal (2004), Hairspray (2007)
- Dawn of the Planet of the Apes (2011)
- Hitchcock (2012)
- Rise of the Planet of the Apes (2014)
- Wild (2014)
- La La Land (2016)
- First Man (2018)

For the critically acclaimed musical-drama La La Land she received a nomination for the Academy Award for Best Sound Editing (shared with Ai-Ling Lee) at the 89th Academy Awards. Together with Ai-Ling Lee, their nomination became the first female team to be nominated in the category.

== Awards ==
- Nominated: Academy Award for Best Sound Editing
- Nominated: BAFTA Award for Best Sound
- Nominated: Satellite Award for Best Sound
- Motion Picture Sound Editors Awards

Nominated: Best Sound Editing - Dialogue and ADR in an English Language Feature - Dawn of the Planet of the Apes
Nominated: Best Sound Editing - Dialogue and ADR in a Feature Film - Rise of the Planet of the Apes
Nominated: Best Sound Editing in Domestic Features - Dialogue & ADR - The Terminal
Nominated: Best Sound Editing in Feature Film - Animated - Sound - Sinbad: Legend of the Seven Seas
Nominated: Best Sound Editing in Domestic Features - Dialogue & ADR - Antwone Fisher
Nominated: Best Sound Editing in Domestic Features - Dialogue & ADR - Catch Me If You Can
Nominated: Best Sound Editing - Dialogue & ADR, Domestic Feature Film - The Fast and the Furious
