= Richard C. Franklin =

Sound editor

- Born: Richard C. Franklin Jr.
- Other name: Rick Franklin
- Occupation: Sound editor
- Years active: 1979–present

Richard C. Franklin is a sound editor. He was nominated at the 63rd Academy Awards for Best Sound Editing for the film Flatliners. The nomination was shared with Charles L. Campbell.

He has done over 90 films to date, including E.T. the Extra-Terrestrial.
