= Karen Baker Landers =

Academy Award-winning sound editor

- Other name: Karen M. Baker
- Occupation: Sound editor
- Years active: 1988–present
- Spouse: Chad Landers

Karen Baker Landers is a two-time Academy Award-winning sound editor. She also has won and been nominated for several Motion Picture Sound Editors awards as well as winning the BAFTA Award for Best Sound. She often works with Per Hallberg.

She has over 100 credits.

== Academy Awards ==
Both Oscars are for Best Sound Editing.

- 80th Academy Awards: The Bourne Ultimatum. Shared with Per Hallberg. Won.
- 85th Academy Awards: Skyfall. Shared with Per Hallberg. Won. (Tied with Zero Dark Thirty for which the winner was Paul N. J. Ottosson).
