= Sean McCormack (sound editor) =

- Occupation: Sound editor
- Years active: 1992–present

Sean McCormack is a sound editor who was nominated at the 79th Academy Awards in the category of Best Sound Editing. He was nominated for the film Apocalypto, which his nomination was shared with Kami Asgar.

He also did some sound on the TV show The Simpsons.

== Selected filmography ==
- Heaven Is for Real (2014)
- Muppets Most Wanted (2014)
- Ride Along (2014)
- Think Like a Man Too (2014)
- Grown Ups 2 (2013)
- Last Vegas (2013)
- The Muppets (2011)
- Country Strong (2010)
- Secretariat (2010)
- The Taking of Pelham 1 2 3 (2009)
- Zombieland (2009)
- The Great Debaters (2007)
- Apocalypto (2006)
- Seraphim Falls (2006)
- The Passion of the Christ (2004)
