= Per Hallberg =

Swedish sound editor (born 1958)

- Born: Per Göran Allan Hallberg; December 30, 1958 (age 67); Borgholm, Sweden
- Occupation: Sound editor
- Years active: 1989-present

Per Hallberg (born December 30, 1958), is a Swedish film sound editor whose work has appeared in over 40 movies. He has won three Academy Awards for Best Sound Editing for the films Braveheart (1995), The Bourne Ultimatum (2007) and Skyfall (2012). He was also nominated for the award for Face/Off (1997).

Hallberg works for the notable Hollywood sound post production company Soundelux.

He often works with Karen Baker Landers.
