= Dane Davis =

American sound editor

- Occupation: Sound editor
- Years active: 1981–present

Dane Davis is a sound editor with over 150 film credits. He won the Academy Award for Best Sound Editing during the 72nd Academy Awards for The Matrix.

He is most known for his work on The Matrix films. With the exception of Cloud Atlas, he has worked on all the films by The Wachowskis and their TV series, Sense8.

He provided the voice of Morph in Treasure Planet (2002).

He is the president of Danetracks Studios.
