= Kami Asgar =

Iranian-American sound editor and film producer (born 1965)

- Born: May 26, 1965 (age 60)
- Occupations: Sound editor; Film producer
- Years active: 1990–present

Kami Asgar is an Iranian-American sound editor and film producer. He received an Academy Award nomination for his work on the film Apocalypto (2006), for which he became the first and only Middle Eastern to date to be nominated for Best Sound Editing.

== Awards and nominations ==
Year	Award	Category	Nominated work	Result	Ref.
1996	48th Primetime Creative Arts Emmy Awards	Outstanding Sound Editing for a Series	"Halloween III"; Dr. Quinn, Medicine Woman	Nominated	
2005	52nd Golden Reel Awards	Best Sound Editing – Dialogue & ADR, Domestic Feature Film	The Passion of the Christ	Nominated	
2007	79th Academy Awards	Best Sound Editing	Apocalypto	Nominated	
2007	54th Golden Reel Awards	Best Sound Editing in Feature Film – Dialogue & ADR	Apocalypto	Nominated	
2010	15th Satellite Awards	Best Sound	Secretariat	Nominated	

== See also ==
- List of Asian Academy Award winners and nominees
