= Charles L. Campbell =

American sound engineer

- Born: August 17, 1930; Detroit, Michigan
- Died: June 21, 2013 (aged 82); Los Angeles County, California
- Occupation: Sound editor
- Years active: 1959-2008
- Spouse: Maxine Valentino Campbell

Charles L. Campbell (August 17, 1930 – June 21, 2013) was an American sound engineer who won three Academy Awards for Best Sound Editing. He also served as Governor of the Academy of Motion Picture Arts and Sciences (AMPAS) 1984–1987.

== Early life ==
Campbell was born in Detroit, Michigan but moved West with his family when he was a boy. He attended Hollywood Professional School and Los Angeles City College before beginning his career in the film industry career as a messenger at Warner Brothers Studios.

== Career and awards ==
Campbell won Academy Awards for Best Sound Editing for the following films:

- 1989 Who Framed Roger Rabbit
- 1986 Back to the Future
- 1983 E.T. the Extra-Terrestrial

In addition, he was nominated for an Academy Award for Best Sound Editing for the 1990 film Flatliners.

In 2001, Campbell received the Career Achievement Award from the Motion Picture Sound Editors. On February 16, 2014, Steven Spielberg honored Campbell at the 61st Motion Picture Sound Editors Golden Reel Awards ceremony.

== Selected filmography ==
Campbell served as sound editor on the following films:

- Sinbad: Legend of the Seven Seas (2003)
- Catch Me If You Can (2002)
- Amistad (1997)
- The Mirror Has Two Faces (1996)
- Balto (1995)
- The Trigger Effect (1996)
- Free Willy 2: The Adventure Home (1995)
- The River Wild (1995)
- The Client (1994)
- Schindler's List (1993)
- Undercover Blues (1993)
- Heart and Souls (1993)
- Falling Down (1993)
- A Few Good Men (1992)
- Death Becomes Her (1992)
- The Marrying Man (1991)
- The Rocketeer (1991)
- Hook (1991)
- City Slickers (1991)
- Flatliners (1990)
- Misery (1990)
- Back to the Future Part III (1990)
- When Harry Met Sally... (1989)
- The Little Mermaid (1989)
- Chances Are (1989)
- Back to the Future Part II (1989)
- Who Framed Roger Rabbit (1988)
- Empire of the Sun (1987)
- The Lost Boys (1987)
- Three Amigos (1986)
- The Money Pit (1986)
- Ruthless People (1986)
- Spies Like Us (1985)
- The Breakfast Club (1985)
- Back to the Future (1985)
- Romancing the Stone (1984)
- Swing Shift (1984)
- American Dreamer (1984)
- Trading Places (1983)
- Eddie and the Cruisers (1983)
- E.T. the Extra-Terrestrial (1982)
- Cat People (1982)
- The Border (1982)
- Ghost Story (1981)
- All Night Long (1981)
- Used Cars (1980)
- Cruising (1980)
- Inside Moves (1980)
- The Main Event (1979)
- Days of Heaven (1978)
- Eyes of Laura Mars (1978)
- The Brink's Job (1978)
- The Hellstrom Chronicle (1971)
- Willy Wonka & the Chocolate Factory (1971)
