= Renée Tondelli =

Renée Tondelli is a supervising sound editor, she is best known for her works on films such as The Passion of the Christ (2004), Memoirs of a Geisha (2005), Django Unchained (2012), Lone Survivor (2013), American Hustle (2013), Into the Woods (2014), and Deepwater Horizon (2016) for which she was nominated for the Academy Award for Best Sound Editing (along with Wylie Stateman) at the 89th Academy Awards.

== Awards and nominations ==
- 2017: Academy Award for Best Sound Editing - Deepwater Horizon: Nominated
- 2014: Satellite Award for Best Sound - Into the Woods: Won
- Cinema Audio Society Awards

2014: Best Sound Editing - Dialogue and ADR in a Feature Film: Won
2014: Best Sound Editing - Dialogue and ADR in a Feature Film - Lone Survivor: Won
2007: Best Sound Editing in a Feature Film: Dialogue and Automated Dialogue Replacement - World Trade Center: Won
2006: Best Sound Editing in Feature Film - Dialogue and Automated Dialogue Replacement - Memoirs of a Geisha: Won
2005: Best Sound Editing in Domestic Features - Dialogue & ADR - The Passion of the Christ: Won
