= Ai-Ling Lee =

Singaporean sound editor

Ai-Ling Lee is a Singaporean sound editor, re-recording mixer and audio engineer working in Los Angeles, California. Her works on films, Bruce Almighty (2003), Spider-Man 2 (2004), Mr. & Mrs. Smith (2005), The Twilight Saga: New Moon (2009), Tangled (2010), Transformers: Dark of the Moon (2011), 300: Rise of an Empire (2014), X-Men: Days of Future Past (2014), Wild (2014), The Maze Runner (2014–15), Deadpool (2016), and critically acclaimed musical-drama La La Land, for which she received two Academy Award nominations (Best Sound Editing and Best Sound Mixing). With her nomination for the Academy Award for Best Sound Editing, she and her sound editing partner for the film Mildred Iatrou Morgan became the first female team to be nominated in the category.

== Selected filmography ==
- First Man (2018)
- La La Land (2016)
- Deadpool (2016)
- Wild (2014)
- X-Men: Days of Future Past (2014)
- Godzilla (2014)
- Man of Steel (2013)
- Snow White and the Huntsman (2012)
- Transformers: Dark of the Moon (2011)
- Thor (2011)
- The Twilight Saga: New Moon (2009)
- 2012 (2009)
- Terminator Salvation (2009)
- Watchmen (2009)
- Live Free or Die Hard (2007)
- Mr. & Mrs. Smith (2005)
- Spider-Man 2 (2004)
- Bruce Almighty (2003)
- The Scorpion King (2002)
- Jimmy Neutron: Boy Genius (2001)
- The Waterboy (1998)

== Awards ==
- Nominated: Academy Award for Best Sound Mixing
- Nominated: BAFTA Award for Best Sound
- Won: Cinema Audio Society Award for Outstanding Achievement in Sound Mixing for a Motion Picture – Live Action
- Nominated: Satellite Award for Best Sound
