= Philip Stockton =

Sound editor

Philip Stockton is a sound editor.

== Biography ==
On February 26, 2012, he won an Academy Award for the movie Hugo. He also won a 2011 BAFTA for his work on that film and also won Emmy Award for Boardwalk Empire. This film also earned Stockton and Gearty a British Academy Film Award for Best Sound, along with Tom Fleischman and John Midgley. In 2013, he and Gearty were nominated for another Academy Award and (along with Drew Kunin and Ron Bartlett ) another British Academy Film Award for their work on Life of Pi, and won a Golden Reel Award from the Motion Picture Sound Editors Society with Kenton Jakub . Stockton is also the recipient of an Emmy for his work on Boardwalk Empire, as well as three other Golden Reel Awards, and has been nominated for three other Emmys, two other British Academy Film Awards, and four other Golden Reel Awards.
