= Eugene Gearty =

American sound engineer

- Education: Berklee College of Music
- Occupation: Sound engineer
- Years active: 1983-present

Eugene Gearty is an American sound engineer. He was nominated for an Academy Award in the category Best Sound for the film Gangs of New York. He has worked on over 80 films since 1983. At the 84th Academy Awards, Gearty won an Oscar for Best Sound Editing for his work on Martin Scorsese's Hugo. He also won Emmy Award for Boardwalk Empire.

== Selected filmography ==
- Gangs of New York (2002)
- Hugo (2011)
- Life of Pi (2012)
- The Irishman (2019)
