= Oliver Tarney =

British sound supervisor and sound designer

- Occupation: Sound editor
- Years active: 1997-present

Oliver Tarney is a British sound supervisor and sound designer who is most known for his work with Ridley Scott and Paul Greengrass.

Oliver has been nominated for five Academy Awards to date. Tarney was first nominated in the Best Sound Editing category, for the 2013 film Captain Phillips. He received his second Oscar nomination in 2016 for the film The Martian. Tarney's third nomination was for 1917 in 2020. The following year, he was nominated once again for News of the World, and in 2022, he received his fifth Oscar nomination for No Time to Die. Tarney has also been nominated for six BAFTAs; in 2007, for United 93, along with Captain Phillips, The Martian, 1917, News of the World, and No Time to Die.
