= List of accolades received by Mad Max: Fury Road =

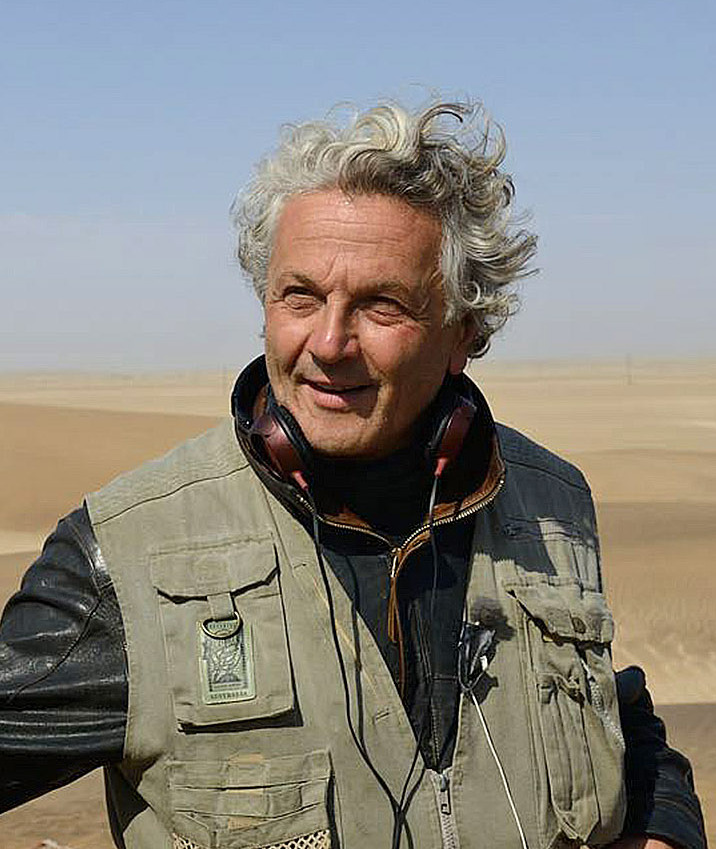
- George Miller received many awards and nominations for directing the film.
Accolades
Award	Won	Nominated
AACTA Awards	10	15
Academy Awards	6	10
ACE Eddie Awards	1	1
African-American Film Critics Association	1	1
Alliance of Women Film Journalists	2	6
American Film Institute	1	1
American Society of Cinematographers	0	1
Art Directors Guild	1	1
Austin Film Critics Association	3	6
Australian Film Critics Association	1	4
Belgian Film Critics Association	0	1
Boston Society of Film Critics	1	2
British Academy Film Awards	4	7
Camerimage	0	1
Casting Society of America	0	1
Chicago Film Critics Association	5	7
Cinema Audio Society Awards	0	1
Costume Designers Guild	1	1
Critics' Choice Movie Awards	9	13
Dallas–Fort Worth Film Critics Association	1	3
Detroit Film Critics Society	1	2
Directors Guild of America Awards	0	1
Dorian Awards	1	3
Dublin Film Critics Circle	0	2
Empire Awards	4	10
Environmental Media Awards	0	1
Florida Film Critics Circle	4	7
Golden Globes Awards	0	2
Golden Trailer Awards	1	13
Hollywood Film Awards	2	2
Houston Film Critics Society	2	7
International Federation of Film Critics	1	1
Kinema Junpo	2	2
London Film Critics' Circle	3	5
Los Angeles Film Critics Association	3	5
Motion Picture Sound Editors	1	3
MTV Movie Awards	1	4
National Board of Review	1	1
National Society of Film Critics	0	3
New York Film Critics Online	2	2
Online Film Critics Society	4	5
Producers Guild of America Award	0	1
San Diego Film Critics Society	4	9
San Francisco Film Critics Circle	4	6
Satellite Awards	1	4
Saturn Awards	1	10
Screen Actors Guild Awards	1	1
St. Louis Film Critics Association	4	9
Teen Choice Awards	0	2
Toronto Film Critics Association	0	2
Vancouver Film Critics Circle	1	2
Village Voice Film Poll	2	2
Visual Effects Society	1	3
Washington D.C. Area Film Critics Association	3	7
- Total number of awards and nominations
Totals	102	222
- References

Mad Max: Fury Road is a 2015 post-apocalyptic action film directed by George Miller. It was produced by Miller, Doug Mitchell, and P. J. Voeten. The screenplay was written by Miller, Brendan McCarthy, and Nico Lathouris. The film is set in a dystopian desert wasteland where gasoline and water are rare commodities. Tom Hardy stars as the title character Max Rockatansky, who helps rebel soldier Imperator Furiosa (Charlize Theron), rescue five women from the imprisonment of despotic leader Immortan Joe (Hugh Keays-Byrne). Nicholas Hoult and Rosie Huntington-Whiteley feature in supporting roles. It is the fourth film in the Mad Max franchise.

The film premiered at the TCL Chinese Theatre in Los Angeles on 7 May 2015. Warner Bros. later gave the film a wide release on 15 May at over 3,700 theaters in the United States and Canada. Mad Max: Fury Road grossed a worldwide total of $380.4 million on a production budget of $154.6–185.1 million. Rotten Tomatoes, a review aggregator, surveyed 424 reviews and judged 97 percent to be positive.

Mad Max: Fury Road garnered many awards and nominations in a variety of categories with particular praise for Miller's direction, screenplay, action sequences, visuals, costume design, cinematography, musical score, editing, and the performances of Hardy and Theron. It received ten nominations at the 88th Academy Awards, including Best Picture, Best Director for Miller, and Best Visual Effects. The film went on to win the most awards at the ceremony, with six, including Best Film Editing, Best Production Design, and Best Costume Design. Mad Max: Fury Road garnered seven nominations at the 69th British Academy Film Awards, and won four for Best Production Design, Best Editing, Best Makeup & Hair, and Best Costume Design. At the 5th AACTA Awards, the film received fifteen nominations, and won ten including Best Film, and Best Direction for Miller. The American Film Institute included the film in their list of the top ten of the year.

== Accolades ==
Accolades received by Mad Max: Fury Road
Award	Date of ceremony	Category	Recipient(s)	Result	Ref.
AACTA Awards	9 December 2015	Best Film	Doug Mitchell, P. J. Voeten, and George Miller	Won	
AACTA Awards	9 December 2015	Best Direction	George Miller	Won	
AACTA Awards	9 December 2015	Best Original Screenplay	George Miller, Brendan McCarthy, and Nico Lathouris	Nominated	
AACTA Awards	9 December 2015	Best Cinematography	John Seale	Won	
AACTA Awards	9 December 2015	Best Editing	Margaret Sixel	Won	
AACTA Awards	9 December 2015	Best Sound	Chris Jenkins, Mark Mangini, Ben Osmo, Wayne Pashley, Gregg Rudloff, and David White	Won	
AACTA Awards	9 December 2015	Best Original Music Score	Junkie XL	Won	
AACTA Awards	9 December 2015	Best Production Design	Colin Gibson	Won	
AACTA Awards	9 December 2015	Best Costume Design	Jenny Beavan	Nominated	
AACTA Awards	9 December 2015	Best Actress	Charlize Theron	Nominated	
AACTA Awards	9 December 2015	Best Visual Effects or Animation	Mad Max: Fury Road	Won	
AACTA Awards	9 December 2015	People's Choice Award for Favourite Australian Film	Doug Mitchell, P. J. Voeten, and George Miller	Nominated	
AACTA Awards	31 January 2016	Best International Film	Mad Max: Fury Road	Won	
AACTA Awards	31 January 2016	Best International Direction	George Miller	Won	
AACTA Awards	31 January 2016	Best International Actress	Charlize Theron	Nominated	
Academy Awards	28 February 2016	Best Picture	Doug Mitchell and George Miller	Nominated	
Academy Awards	28 February 2016	Best Director	George Miller	Nominated	
Academy Awards	28 February 2016	Best Cinematography	John Seale	Nominated	
Academy Awards	28 February 2016	Best Costume Design	Jenny Beavan	Won	
Academy Awards	28 February 2016	Best Film Editing	Margaret Sixel	Won	
Academy Awards	28 February 2016	Best Makeup and Hairstyling	Lesley Vanderwalt, Elka Wardega, and Damian Martin	Won	
Academy Awards	28 February 2016	Best Production Design	Colin Gibson and Lisa Thompson	Won	
Academy Awards	28 February 2016	Best Sound Editing	Mark Mangini and David White	Won	
Academy Awards	28 February 2016	Best Sound Mixing	Chris Jenkins, Gregg Rudloff, and Ben Osmo	Won	
Academy Awards	28 February 2016	Best Visual Effects	Andrew Jackson, Tom Wood, Dan Oliver, and Andy Williams	Nominated	
ACE Eddie Awards	29 January 2016	Best Edited Feature Film – Dramatic	Margaret Sixel	Won	
African-American Film Critics Association	7 December 2015	Top Ten Films of 2015	Mad Max: Fury Road	3rd Place	
Alliance of Women Film Journalists	13 January 2016	Best Picture	Mad Max: Fury Road	Nominated	
Alliance of Women Film Journalists	13 January 2016	Best Director	George Miller	Nominated	
Alliance of Women Film Journalists	13 January 2016	Best Editing	Margaret Sixel	Won	
Alliance of Women Film Journalists	13 January 2016	Best Cinematography	John Seale	Nominated	
Alliance of Women Film Journalists	13 January 2016	Best Original Score	Junkie XL	Nominated	
Alliance of Women Film Journalists	13 January 2016	Best Female Action Star	Charlize Theron	Won	
American Film Institute	16 December 2015	Top Ten Films of the Year	Mad Max: Fury Road	Won (Note: This award does not have a single winner, but recognizes multiple films.)	
American Society of Cinematographers	14 February 2016	Outstanding Achievement in Cinematography in a Theatrical Release	John Seale	Nominated	
Art Directors Guild	31 January 2016	Excellence in Production Design for a Feature Film – Fantasy Film	Colin Gibson	Won	
Austin Film Critics Association	29 December 2015	Best Picture	Mad Max: Fury Road	Won	
Austin Film Critics Association	29 December 2015	AFCA 2015 Top Ten Films	Mad Max: Fury Road	1st Place	
Austin Film Critics Association	29 December 2015	Best Director	George Miller	Won	
Austin Film Critics Association	29 December 2015	Best Actress	Charlize Theron	Nominated	
Austin Film Critics Association	29 December 2015	Best Cinematography	John Seale	Nominated	
Austin Film Critics Association	29 December 2015	Best Original Score	Junkie XL	Nominated	
Australian Film Critics Association	16 February 2016	Best Actress	Charlize Theron	Nominated	
Australian Film Critics Association	16 February 2016	Best Supporting Actor	Hugh Keays-Byrne	Nominated	
Australian Film Critics Association	16 February 2016	Best Screenplay	George Miller, Brendan McCarthy, and Nico Lathouris	Nominated	
Australian Film Critics Association	16 February 2016	Best Cinematography	John Seale	Won	
Belgian Film Critics Association	10 January 2016	Grand Prix	Mad Max: Fury Road	Nominated	
Boston Society of Film Critics	6 December 2015	Best Picture	Mad Max: Fury Road	Runner-up	
Boston Society of Film Critics	6 December 2015	Best Editing	Margaret Sixel	Won	
British Academy Film Awards	14 February 2016	Best Production Design	Colin Gibson and Lisa Thompson	Won	
British Academy Film Awards	14 February 2016	Best Costume Design	Jenny Beavan	Won	
British Academy Film Awards	14 February 2016	Best Editing	Margaret Sixel	Won	
British Academy Film Awards	14 February 2016	Best Cinematography	John Seale	Nominated	
British Academy Film Awards	14 February 2016	Best Makeup & Hair	Lesley Vanderwalt and Damian Martin	Won	
British Academy Film Awards	14 February 2016	Best Special Visual Effects	Andrew Jackson, Dan Oliver, Tom Wood, and Andy Williams	Nominated	
British Academy Film Awards	14 February 2016	Best Sound	Scott Hecker, Chris Jenkins, Mark Mangini, Ben Osmo, Gregg Rudloff, and David White	Nominated	
Camerimage	21 November 2015	Golden Frog for Best Cinematography	John Seale	Nominated	
Casting Society of America	21 January 2016	Big Budget – Drama	Ronna Kress and Nikki Barrett for Mad Max: Fury Road	Nominated	
Chicago Film Critics Association	16 December 2015	Best Picture	Mad Max: Fury Road	Won	
Chicago Film Critics Association	16 December 2015	Best Director	George Miller	Won	
Chicago Film Critics Association	16 December 2015	Best Actress	Charlize Theron	Nominated	
Chicago Film Critics Association	16 December 2015	Best Production Design	Colin Gibson	Won	
Chicago Film Critics Association	16 December 2015	Best Cinematography	John Seale	Won	
Chicago Film Critics Association	16 December 2015	Best Editing	Margaret Sixel	Won	
Chicago Film Critics Association	16 December 2015	Best Original Score	Junkie XL	Nominated	
Cinema Audio Society Awards	20 February 2016	Outstanding Achievement in Sound Mixing	Mad Max: Fury Road	Nominated	
Costume Designers Guild	23 February 2016	Excellence in Fantasy Film	Jenny Beavan	Won	
Critics' Choice Movie Awards	17 January 2016	Best Picture	Mad Max: Fury Road	Nominated	
Critics' Choice Movie Awards	17 January 2016	Best Director	George Miller	Won	
Critics' Choice Movie Awards	17 January 2016	Best Actress	Charlize Theron	Nominated	
Critics' Choice Movie Awards	17 January 2016	Best Production Design	Colin Gibson	Won	
Critics' Choice Movie Awards	17 January 2016	Best Costume Design	Jenny Beavan	Won	
Critics' Choice Movie Awards	17 January 2016	Best Hair & Makeup	Mad Max: Fury Road	Won	
Critics' Choice Movie Awards	17 January 2016	Best Visual Effects	Mad Max: Fury Road	Won	
Critics' Choice Movie Awards	17 January 2016	Best Action Movie	Mad Max: Fury Road	Won	
Critics' Choice Movie Awards	17 January 2016	Best Actor in an Action Movie	Tom Hardy	Won	
Critics' Choice Movie Awards	17 January 2016	Best Actress in an Action Movie	Charlize Theron	Won	
Critics' Choice Movie Awards	17 January 2016	Best Sci-fi/Horror Movie	Mad Max: Fury Road	Nominated	
Critics' Choice Movie Awards	17 January 2016	Best Cinematography	John Seale	Nominated	
Critics' Choice Movie Awards	17 January 2016	Best Editing	Margaret Sixel	Won	
Dallas–Fort Worth Film Critics Association	14 December 2015	Top Ten Films	Mad Max: Fury Road	5th Place	
Dallas–Fort Worth Film Critics Association	14 December 2015	Best Director	George Miller	3rd Place	
Dallas–Fort Worth Film Critics Association	14 December 2015	Best Actress	Charlize Theron	5th Place	
Detroit Film Critics Society	14 December 2015	Best Picture	Mad Max: Fury Road	Nominated	
Detroit Film Critics Society	14 December 2015	Best Director	George Miller	Won	
Directors Guild of America Awards	6 February 2016	Outstanding Directorial Achievement in Feature Film	George Miller	Nominated	
Dorian Awards	19 January 2016	Film of the Year	Mad Max: Fury Road	Nominated	
Dorian Awards	19 January 2016	Director of the Year	George Miller	Nominated	
Dorian Awards	19 January 2016	Visually Striking Film of the Year	Mad Max: Fury Road	Won	
Dublin Film Critics Circle	22 December 2015	Best Film	Mad Max: Fury Road	2nd Place	
Dublin Film Critics Circle	22 December 2015	Best Actress	Charlize Theron	4th Place	
Empire Awards	20 March 2016	Best Film	Mad Max: Fury Road	Nominated	
Empire Awards	20 March 2016	Best Director	George Miller	Nominated	
Empire Awards	20 March 2016	Best Actor	Tom Hardy (also for Legend)	Nominated	
Empire Awards	20 March 2016	Best Actress	Charlize Theron	Nominated	
Empire Awards	20 March 2016	Best Sci-Fi/Fantasy	Mad Max: Fury Road	Nominated	
Empire Awards	20 March 2016	Best Soundtrack	Mad Max: Fury Road	Won	
Empire Awards	20 March 2016	Best Production Design	Mad Max: Fury Road	Won	
Empire Awards	20 March 2016	Best Costume Design	Mad Max: Fury Road	Won	
Empire Awards	20 March 2016	Best Makeup and Hairstyling	Mad Max: Fury Road	Won	
Empire Awards	20 March 2016	Best Visual Effects	Mad Max: Fury Road	Nominated	
Environmental Media Awards	24 October 2015	Feature Film	Mad Max: Fury Road	Nominated	
Florida Film Critics Circle	23 December 2015	Best Film	Mad Max: Fury Road	Won	
Florida Film Critics Circle	23 December 2015	Best Director	George Miller	Won	
Florida Film Critics Circle	23 December 2015	Best Actress	Charlize Theron	Nominated	
Florida Film Critics Circle	23 December 2015	Best Original Score	Junkie XL	Nominated	
Florida Film Critics Circle	23 December 2015	Best Cinematography	John Seale	Won	
Florida Film Critics Circle	23 December 2015	Best Production Design	Colin Gibson	Runner-up	
Florida Film Critics Circle	23 December 2015	Best Visual Effects	Mad Max: Fury Road	Won	
Golden Globe Awards	10 January 2016	Best Motion Picture – Drama	Mad Max: Fury Road	Nominated	
Golden Globe Awards	10 January 2016	Best Director – Motion Picture	George Miller	Nominated	
Golden Trailer Awards	6 May 2015	Best Summer Blockbuster Trailer	"Mad"	Nominated	
Golden Trailer Awards	6 May 2015	Most Original Trailer	"Mad"	Won	
Golden Trailer Awards	6 May 2015	Best Sound Editing	"Hunted"	Nominated	
Golden Trailer Awards	6 May 2015	Best Action TV Spot	"Mad"	Nominated	
Golden Trailer Awards	6 May 2015	Best Music TV Spot	"Mad"	Nominated	
Golden Trailer Awards	6 May 2015	Most Original TV Spot	"Mad"	Nominated	
Golden Trailer Awards	4 May 2016	Best Action	"Survive"	Nominated	
Golden Trailer Awards	4 May 2016	Best Motion / Title Graphics	"Retaliate"	Nominated	
Golden Trailer Awards	4 May 2016	Best Sound Editing	"Retaliate"	Nominated	
Golden Trailer Awards	4 May 2016	Best Sound Editing	"Survive"	Nominated	
Golden Trailer Awards	4 May 2016	Best Action TV Spot	"60TV Redemption"	Nominated	
Golden Trailer Awards	4 May 2016	Best Graphics in a TV Spot	":60 Mad"	Nominated	
Golden Trailer Awards	4 May 2016	Best Sound Editing in a TV Spot	"The Future"	Nominated	
Hollywood Film Awards	1 November 2015	Hollywood Make-Up & Hair Styling Award	Lesley Vanderwalt	Won	
Hollywood Film Awards	1 November 2015	Hollywood Production Design Award	Colin Gibson	Won	
Houston Film Critics Society	9 January 2016	Best Film	Mad Max: Fury Road	Nominated	
Houston Film Critics Society	9 January 2016	Best Director	George Miller	Nominated	
Houston Film Critics Society	9 January 2016	Best Actress	Charlize Theron	Nominated	
Houston Film Critics Society	9 January 2016	Best Original Score	Junkie XL	Nominated	
Houston Film Critics Society	9 January 2016	Best Cinematography	John Seale	Nominated	
Houston Film Critics Society	9 January 2016	Best Poster	Mad Max: Fury Road	Won	
Houston Film Critics Society	9 January 2016	Technical achievement	Mad Max: Fury Road	Won	
International Federation of Film Critics	1 September 2015	Best Film	Mad Max: Fury Road	Won	
Kinema Junpo	7 January 2016	Best Foreign Film	Mad Max: Fury Road	Won	
Kinema Junpo	7 January 2016	Best Foreign Director	George Miller	Won	
London Film Critics' Circle	17 January 2016	Film of the Year	Mad Max: Fury Road	Won	
London Film Critics' Circle	17 January 2016	Director of the Year	George Miller	Won	
London Film Critics' Circle	17 January 2016	British or Irish Actor of the Year	Tom Hardy (also for Legend, London Road, and The Revenant)	Won	
London Film Critics' Circle	17 January 2016	Technical Achievement	John Seale (cinematography)	Nominated	
London Film Critics' Circle	17 January 2016	Technical Achievement	Colin Gibson (production design)	Nominated	
Los Angeles Film Critics Association	6 December 2015	Best Picture	Mad Max: Fury Road	Runner-up	
Los Angeles Film Critics Association	6 December 2015	Best Director	George Miller	Won	
Los Angeles Film Critics Association	6 December 2015	Best Cinematography	John Seale	Won	
Los Angeles Film Critics Association	6 December 2015	Best Editing	Margaret Sixel	Runner-up	
Los Angeles Film Critics Association	6 December 2015	Best Production Design	Colin Gibson	Won	
Motion Picture Sound Editors	27 February 2016	Feature Film – Sound Effects & Foley	Mark Mangini and Scott Hecker	Won (Note: Tied with The Revenant (2015))	
Motion Picture Sound Editors	27 February 2016	Feature Film – Dialogue & ADR	Mark Mangini and Scott Hecker	Nominated	
Motion Picture Sound Editors	27 February 2016	Feature Film – Music Score	Bob Badami	Nominated	
MTV Movie Awards	10 April 2016	Best Female Performance	Charlize Theron	Won	
MTV Movie Awards	10 April 2016	Best Hero	Charlize Theron	Nominated	
MTV Movie Awards	10 April 2016	Best Fight	Charlize Theron vs. Tom Hardy	Nominated	
MTV Movie Awards	10 April 2016	Best Villain	Hugh Keays-Byrne	Nominated	
National Board of Review	1 December 2015	Best Film	Mad Max: Fury Road	Won	
National Society of Film Critics	3 January 2016	Best Picture	Mad Max: Fury Road	3rd Place	
National Society of Film Critics	3 January 2016	Best Director	George Miller	3rd Place	
National Society of Film Critics	3 January 2016	Best Cinematography	John Seale	3rd Place	
New York Film Critics Online	6 December 2015	Top Ten Films	Mad Max: Fury Road	Won	
New York Film Critics Online	6 December 2015	Best Cinematography	John Seale	Won	
Online Film Critics Society	13 December 2015	Best Picture	Mad Max: Fury Road	Won	
Online Film Critics Society	13 December 2015	Best Director	George Miller	Won	
Online Film Critics Society	13 December 2015	Best Actress	Charlize Theron	Nominated	
Online Film Critics Society	13 December 2015	Best Editing	Margaret Sixel	Won	
Online Film Critics Society	13 December 2015	Best Cinematography	John Seale	Won	
Producers Guild of America Award	23 January 2016	Outstanding Producer of Theatrical Motion Pictures	Doug Mitchell and George Miller	Nominated	
San Diego Film Critics Society	14 December 2015	Best Picture	Mad Max: Fury Road	Won	
San Diego Film Critics Society	14 December 2015	Best Director	George Miller	Won	
San Diego Film Critics Society	14 December 2015	Best Actress	Charlize Theron	Runner-up	
San Diego Film Critics Society	14 December 2015	Best Editing	Margaret Sixel	Won	
San Diego Film Critics Society	14 December 2015	Best Cinematography	John Seale	Nominated	
San Diego Film Critics Society	14 December 2015	Best Production Design	Colin Gibson	Runner-up	
San Diego Film Critics Society	14 December 2015	Best Sound Design	Mad Max: Fury Road	Won	
San Diego Film Critics Society	14 December 2015	Best Visual Effects	Mad Max: Fury Road	Runner-up	
San Diego Film Critics Society	14 December 2015	Best Use Of Music In A Film	Mad Max: Fury Road	Nominated	
San Francisco Film Critics Circle	13 December 2015	Best Picture	Mad Max: Fury Road	Nominated	
San Francisco Film Critics Circle	13 December 2015	Best Director	George Miller	Won	
San Francisco Film Critics Circle	13 December 2015	Best Cinematography	John Seale	Won	
San Francisco Film Critics Circle	13 December 2015	Best Editing	Margaret Sixel	Won	
San Francisco Film Critics Circle	13 December 2015	Best Production Design	Colin Gibson	Nominated	
Satellite Awards	21 February 2016	Best Cinematography	John Seale	Won	
Satellite Awards	21 February 2016	Best Art Direction and Production Design	Colin Gibson	Nominated	
Satellite Awards	21 February 2016	Best Visual Effects	Mad Max: Fury Road	Nominated	
Satellite Awards	21 February 2016	Best Sound	Chris Jenkins, Mark Mangini, Ben Osmo, Wayne Pashley, Gregg Rudloff, and David White	Nominated	
Saturn Awards	22 June 2016	Best Science Fiction Film	Mad Max: Fury Road	Nominated	
Saturn Awards	22 June 2016	Best Director	George Miller	Nominated	
Saturn Awards	22 June 2016	Best Writing	George Miller, Brendan McCarthy, and Nico Lathouris	Nominated	
Saturn Awards	22 June 2016	Best Actress	Charlize Theron	Won	
Saturn Awards	22 June 2016	Best Music	Junkie XL	Nominated	
Saturn Awards	22 June 2016	Best Editing	Margaret Sixel	Nominated	
Saturn Awards	22 June 2016	Best Production Design	Colin Gibson	Nominated	
Saturn Awards	22 June 2016	Best Make-up	Damian Martin and Nadine Prigge	Nominated	
Saturn Awards	22 June 2016	Best Special Effects	Andrew Jackson, Dan Oliver, Andy Williams, and Tom Wood	Nominated	
Saturn Awards	28 June 2017	Best DVD or Blu-ray Special Edition Release	Black and Chrome Edition home release	Nominated	
Screen Actors Guild Awards	30 January 2016	Outstanding Action Performance By Stunt Ensemble Motion Picture	Mad Max: Fury Road	Won	
St. Louis Film Critics Association	21 December 2015	Best Film	Mad Max: Fury Road	Nominated	
St. Louis Film Critics Association	21 December 2015	Best Director	George Miller	Nominated	
St. Louis Film Critics Association	21 December 2015	Best Actress	Charlize Theron	Nominated	
St. Louis Film Critics Association	21 December 2015	Best Editing	Margaret Sixel	Won	
St. Louis Film Critics Association	21 December 2015	Best Cinematography	John Seale	Nominated	
St. Louis Film Critics Association	21 December 2015	Best Art Direction	Colin Gibson	Won	
St. Louis Film Critics Association	21 December 2015	Best Score	Junkie XL	Nominated	
St. Louis Film Critics Association	21 December 2015	Best Visual Effects	Mad Max: Fury Road	Won	
St. Louis Film Critics Association	21 December 2015	Special Recognition	Mad Max: Fury Road (stunt work)	Won	
Teen Choice Awards	16 August 2015	Choice Movie: Sci-Fi/Fantasy	Mad Max: Fury Road	Nominated	
Teen Choice Awards	16 August 2015	Choice Movie: Scene Stealer	Nicholas Hoult	Nominated	
Toronto Film Critics Association	14 December 2015	Best Picture	Mad Max: Fury Road	Runner-up	
Toronto Film Critics Association	14 December 2015	Best Director	George Miller	Runner-up	
Vancouver Film Critics Circle	21 December 2015	Best Film	Mad Max: Fury Road	Nominated	
Vancouver Film Critics Circle	21 December 2015	Best Director	George Miller	Won	
Village Voice Film Poll	15 December 2015	Best Picture	Mad Max: Fury Road	1st Place	
Village Voice Film Poll	15 December 2015	Best Director	George Miller	Won	
Visual Effects Society	2 February 2016	Outstanding Visual Effects in a Photoreal Feature	Mad Max: Fury Road	Nominated	
Visual Effects Society	2 February 2016	Outstanding Compositing in a Photoreal Feature	Mad Max: Fury Road	Nominated	
Visual Effects Society	2 February 2016	Outstanding Effects Simulations in a Photoreal Feature	"Toxic Storm"	Won	
Washington D.C. Area Film Critics Association	7 December 2015	Best Picture	Mad Max: Fury Road	Nominated	
Washington D.C. Area Film Critics Association	7 December 2015	Best Director	George Miller	Won	
Washington D.C. Area Film Critics Association	7 December 2015	Best Actress	Charlize Theron	Nominated	
Washington D.C. Area Film Critics Association	7 December 2015	Best Production Design	Colin Gibson	Won	
Washington D.C. Area Film Critics Association	7 December 2015	Best Cinematography	John Seale	Nominated	
Washington D.C. Area Film Critics Association	7 December 2015	Best Score	Junkie XL	Nominated	
Washington D.C. Area Film Critics Association	7 December 2015	Best Editing	Margaret Sixel	Won	
