= Bruce Berman =

American film producer (born 1952)

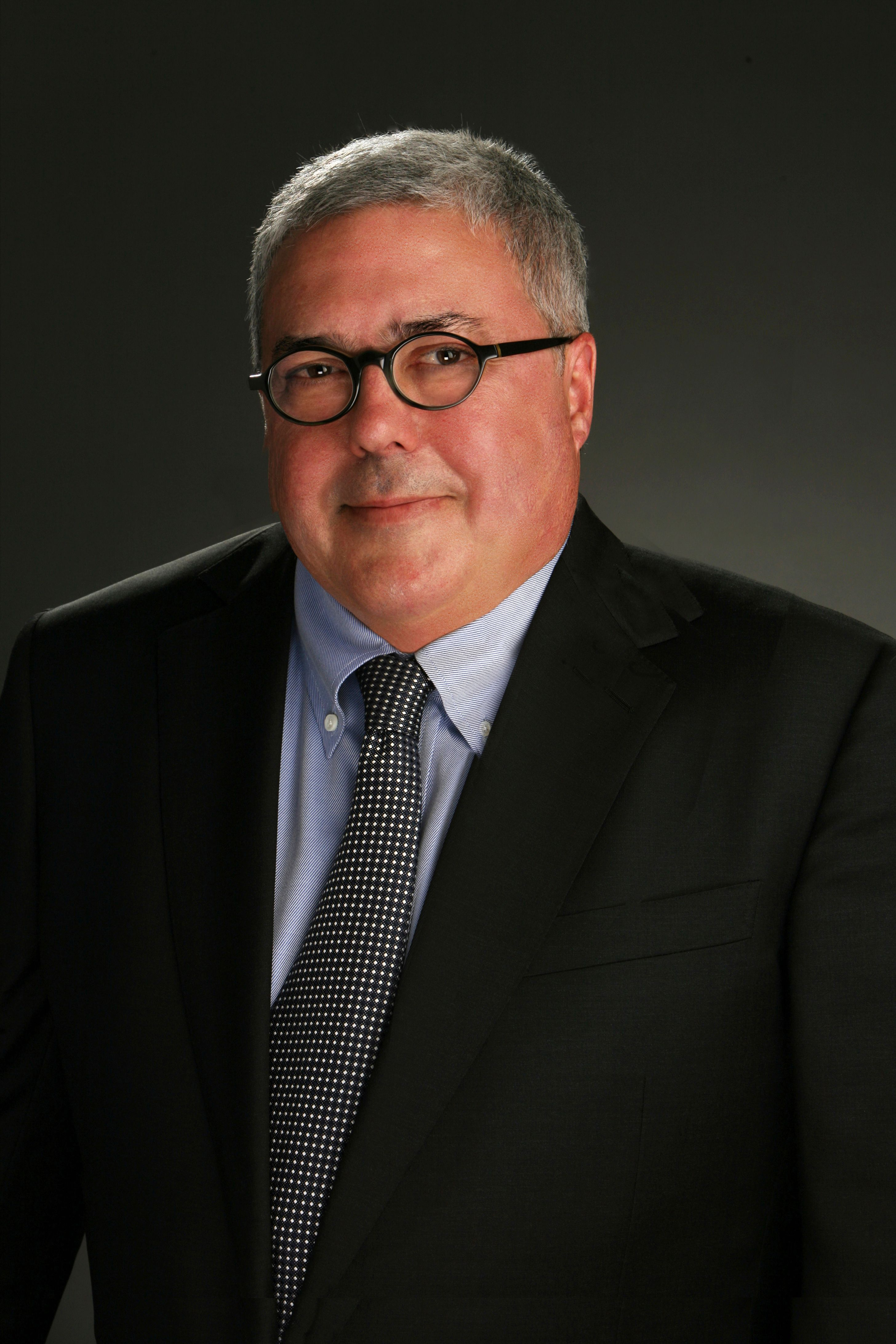
- Berman in 2011
- Born: April 25, 1952 (age 74); New York, New York
- Education: UCLA; Georgetown Law School; California Institute of the Arts Film School; Bennington College
- Occupations: Film industry executive and executive producer
- Years active: 1978 - present
- Employer(s): Chairman and CEO, Village Roadshow Pictures (1997–2021)
- Board member of: Founding member, J. Paul Getty Museum Photographs Council
- Children: 2

Bruce Berman (born April 25, 1952) is an American film industry executive and executive producer. He is the chairman and CEO of Village Roadshow Pictures, a position he held from 1997 to 2021. His credits as an executive producer include American Sniper, The Lego Movie, The Great Gatsby, the Ocean's trilogy, Sherlock Holmes and its sequel, Sherlock Holmes: A Game of Shadows, Happy Feet, and The Matrix franchise.

Berman is noted for his collection of contemporary American photographs. In 2004, he was listed among the world's top 25 photography collectors by ARTnews.

== Early life and education ==
Berman was born to a Jewish family in New York in 1952. As a teenager, he developed a passion for photography and contemplated a career as a photographer. He continued to pursue photography throughout high school and into college, where, as a student at Bennington College, he would take frequent road trips to shoot photos of 20th-century Americana.

Berman's focus shifted to film after he was accepted at the California Institute of the Arts film school. "I didn't think I could make a living at photography," Berman said in a 2007 interview with the Los Angeles Times. "And when I got into film school, I didn't think I could do both."

In addition to Bennington and CalArts, Berman attended UCLA, where he graduated cum laude with a degree in United States history. He also attended Georgetown University Law School, earning a Juris Doctor in 1978.

== Career ==
Berman began working with Jack Valenti at the MPAA while a student at Georgetown. After he received his degree, he was hired as an assistant to Peter Guber at Casablanca Filmworks. In 1979, he moved to Universal Pictures, where he worked for Sean Daniel and Joel Silver. Less than three years later, he was named vice president of production.

In 1984, Berman was recruited by Warner Bros. Pictures as a vice president of production, and in 1987 was promoted to senior vice president of production. He was named president of theatrical production in 1989 and president of worldwide theatrical production in 1991. During his tenure at Warner Bros., he produced and distributed films including Goodfellas, Batman Forever, JFK, The Fugitive, The Bodyguard, and Driving Miss Daisy.

In May 1996, Berman started Plan B Entertainment, an independent motion picture company affiliated with Warner Bros. In 1997, Warner Bros. entered a joint venture with Village Roadshow Pictures, and Berman was appointed chairman and CEO. Considered "one of the industry’s leading financiers and producers of studio-released motion pictures," the Village Roadshow and Warner Bros. partnership was extended in 2012 to 2017. The company established a second joint partnership with Sony Pictures Entertainment in 2014.

On September 27, 2021, Berman stepped down as chairman and CEO of Village Roadshow Pictures.

In May 2023, Bruce came out of retirement to join the new Pan-Asian studio Through The Lens Entertainment as the President and Co-Chairman.

== Photography collection ==
In 1991, Berman was given an Edward S. Curtis photograph of a thatched American Indian shelter as a gift. It inspired him to begin a photography collection, which grew to include more than 2600 works by photographers including William Eggleston, Diane Arbus, Richard Misrach, Dorothea Lange, and Walker Evans. He and his ex-wife Nancy Goliger donated nearly 500 of the photographs to the J. Paul Getty Museum, which in 2007 showcased them in the exhibition Where We Live: Photographs of America From the Berman Collection.

== Personal life ==
Berman has two children: a daughter with his wife, Lea Russo (an art collection manager), and a son from his previous marriage to Goliger.

== Filmography (as executive producer) ==
Year	Title	Notes
1998	Practical Magic	
1999	Analyze This	
1999	The Matrix	Four Academy Awards; Best Film Editing (Zach Staenberg); Best Sound (John Reitz, Gregg Rudloff, David E. Campbell); Best Visual Effects (John Gaeta, Janek Sirrs, Steve Courtley, Jon Thum); Best Sound Effects Editing (Dane A. Davis)
1999	Deep Blue Sea	
1999	Three Kings	
1999	Three to Tango	
2000	Gossip	
2000	Red Planet	Producer
2000	Miss Congeniality	
2001	Valentine	
2001	Saving Silverman	
2001	See Spot Run	
2001	Exit Wounds	
2001	Swordfish	
2001	Cats & Dogs	
2001	Training Day	
2001	Hearts in Atlantis	
2001	Don't Say a Word	
2001	Ocean's Eleven	
2002	Queen of the Damned	
2002	Showtime	
2002	Eight Legged Freaks	Producer
2002	The Adventures of Pluto Nash	
2002	Ghost Ship	
2002	Analyze That	
2002	Two Weeks Notice	
2003	Dreamcatcher	
2003	The Matrix Reloaded	
2003	Mystic River	Two Academy Awards; Best Actor in a Leading Role (Sean Penn); Best Actor in a Supporting Role (Tim Robbins)
2003	The Matrix Revolutions	
2004	Torque	
2004	Taking Lives	
2004	Catwoman	
2004	Ocean's Twelve	
2005	Miss Congeniality 2: Armed & Fabulous	
2005	House of Wax	
2005	Charlie and the Chocolate Factory	Academy Award nomination Best Costume Design (Gabriella Pescucci)
2005	The Dukes of Hazzard	
2005	Rumor Has It...	
2006	Firewall	
2006	The Lake House	
2006	Happy Feet	Academy Award; Best Animated Feature
2006	Unaccompanied Minors	
2007	Music and Lyrics	
2007	The Reaping	
2007	Lucky You	
2007	Ocean's Thirteen	
2007	License to Wed	
2007	No Reservations	
2007	The Invasion	
2007	The Brave One	
2007	I Am Legend	
2008	Street Kings	
2008	Speed Racer	
2008	Get Smart	
2008	Nights in Rodanthe	
2008	Yes Man	
2008	Gran Torino	
2009	Where the Wild Things Are	
2009	Sherlock Holmes	Two Academy Award nominations Best Original Score (Hans Zimmer); Best Art Direction (Sarah Greenwood, Katie Spencer)
2010	Cats & Dogs: The Revenge of Kitty Galore	
2010	Legend of the Guardians: The Owls of Ga'Hoole	
2010	Life as We Know It	
2011	Happy Feet Two	
2011	Sherlock Holmes: A Game of Shadows	
2012	The Lucky One	
2012	Dark Shadows	
2013	Gangster Squad	
2013	The Great Gatsby	Two Academy Awards; Best Production Design (Catherine Martin and Beverley Dunn); Best Costume Design (Catherine Martin)
2014	The Lego Movie	Academy Award nomination Best Original Song (Shawn Patterson)
2014	Winter's Tale	
2014	Edge of Tomorrow	
2014	The Judge	
2014	Into the Storm	
2014	American Sniper	Academy Award; Best Sound Editing (Alan Robert Murray and Bob Asman); Six Academy Award Nominations; Best Picture; Best Actor (Bradley Cooper); Best Adapted Screenplay (Jason Hall); Best Film Editing (Joel Cox and Gary D. Roach); Best Sound Mixing (John T. Reitz, Gregg Rudloff and Walt Martin)
2015	Jupiter Ascending	
2015	Mad Max: Fury Road	Six Academy Awards; Best Film Editing (Margaret Sixel); Best Production Design (Colin Gibson and Lisa Thompson); Best Costume Design (Jenny Beavan); Best Makeup and Hairstyling (Lesley Vanderwalt, Elka Wardega and Damian Martin; Best Sound Mixing (Chris Jenkins, Gregg Rudloff, Ben Osmo); Best Sound Editing (Mark Mangini and David White); Ten Academy Award Nominations; Best Picture; Best Director (George Miller); Best Cinematography (John Seale); Best Visual Effects (Andrew Jackson, Tom Wood, Dan Oliver, and Andy Williams)
2015	San Andreas	
2015	Goosebumps	
2015	Concussion	
2015	In the Heart of the Sea	
2016	Grimsby	
2016	The Legend of Tarzan	
2016	Sully	
2016	The Magnificent Seven	
2016	Collateral Beauty	
2016	Passengers	
2017	Fist Fight	
2017	Going in Style	
2017	King Arthur: Legend of the Sword	
2017	The House	
2018	The 15:17 to Paris	
2018	Ready Player One	
2018	Ocean's 8	
2019	Joker	Two Academy Awards; Best Actor (Joaquin Phoenix); Best Original Score (Hildur Guðnadóttir); Eleven Academy Award Nominations; Best Picture; Best Director (Todd Phillips); Best Adapted Screenplay (Todd Phillips and Scott Silver); Best Film Editing (Jeff Groth); Best Cinematography (Lawrence Sher); Best Costume Design (Mark Bridges); Best Makeup And Hairstyling (Nicki Ledermann, Kay Georgiou); Best Sound Mixing (Tom Ozanich, Dean Zupancic and Tod Maitland); Best Sound Editing (Alan Robert Murray)
2021	The Matrix Resurrections	
