= 69th British Academy Film Awards =

2016 film award ceremony

- Date: 14 February 2016
- Site: Royal Opera House, London
- Hosted by: Stephen Fry

Highlights
- Best Film: The Revenant
- Best British Film: Brooklyn
- Best Actor: Leonardo DiCaprio; The Revenant
- Best Actress: Brie Larson; Room
- Most awards: The Revenant (5)
- Most nominations: Bridge of Spies and Carol (9)

The 69th British Academy Film Awards, more commonly known as the BAFTAs, were held on 14 February 2016 at the Royal Opera House in London, honouring the best national and foreign films of 2015. Presented by the British Academy of Film and Television Arts, accolades were handed out for the best feature-length film and documentaries of any nationality that were screened at British cinemas in 2015.

The nominations were announced on 8 January 2016 by Stephen Fry and actress Gugu Mbatha-Raw. Bridge of Spies and Carol received the most nominations at nine each. Despite leading the field in nominations, Carol failed to win any awards and Bridge of Spies won just one; Mark Rylance for Best Supporting Actor.

The Revenant won the most awards at the ceremony with five, including Best Film, Best Director for Alejandro G. Iñárritu, Best Actor for Leonardo DiCaprio, and Best Cinematography for Emmanuel Lubezki. Brie Larson won Best Actress for Room and Kate Winslet won Best Supporting Actress for Steve Jobs. Mad Max: Fury Road won four awards; Best Costume Design, Best Editing, Best Makeup and Hair, and Best Production Design. Brooklyn, directed by John Crowley, was voted Outstanding British Film of 2015. Sidney Poitier was awarded the BAFTA Fellowship for his contribution to cinema.

The ceremony was broadcast on BBC One and was watched by 4.5 million viewers, down from 4.9 million in 2015 and the lowest television audience since 2010.

== Winners and nominees ==
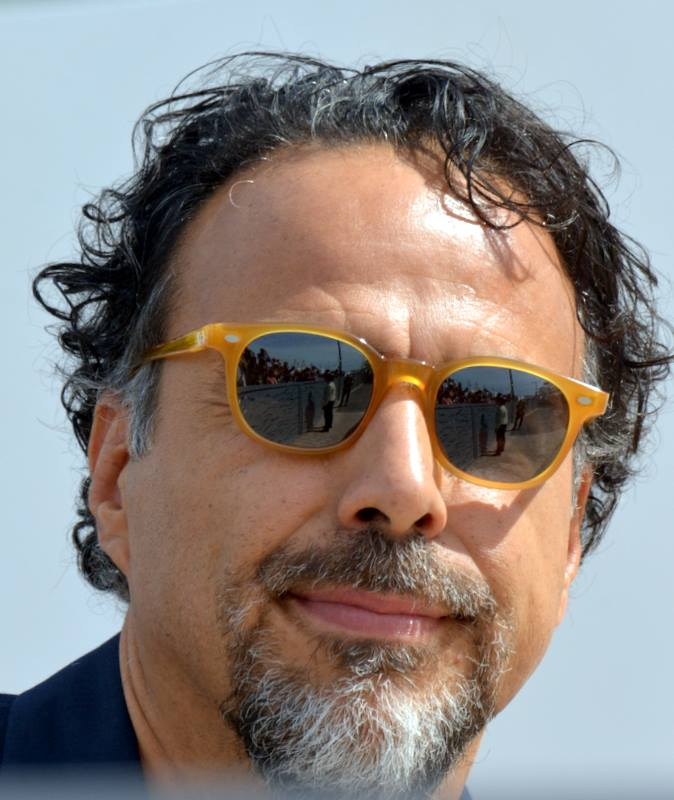
Alejandro G. Iñárritu, Best Director winner

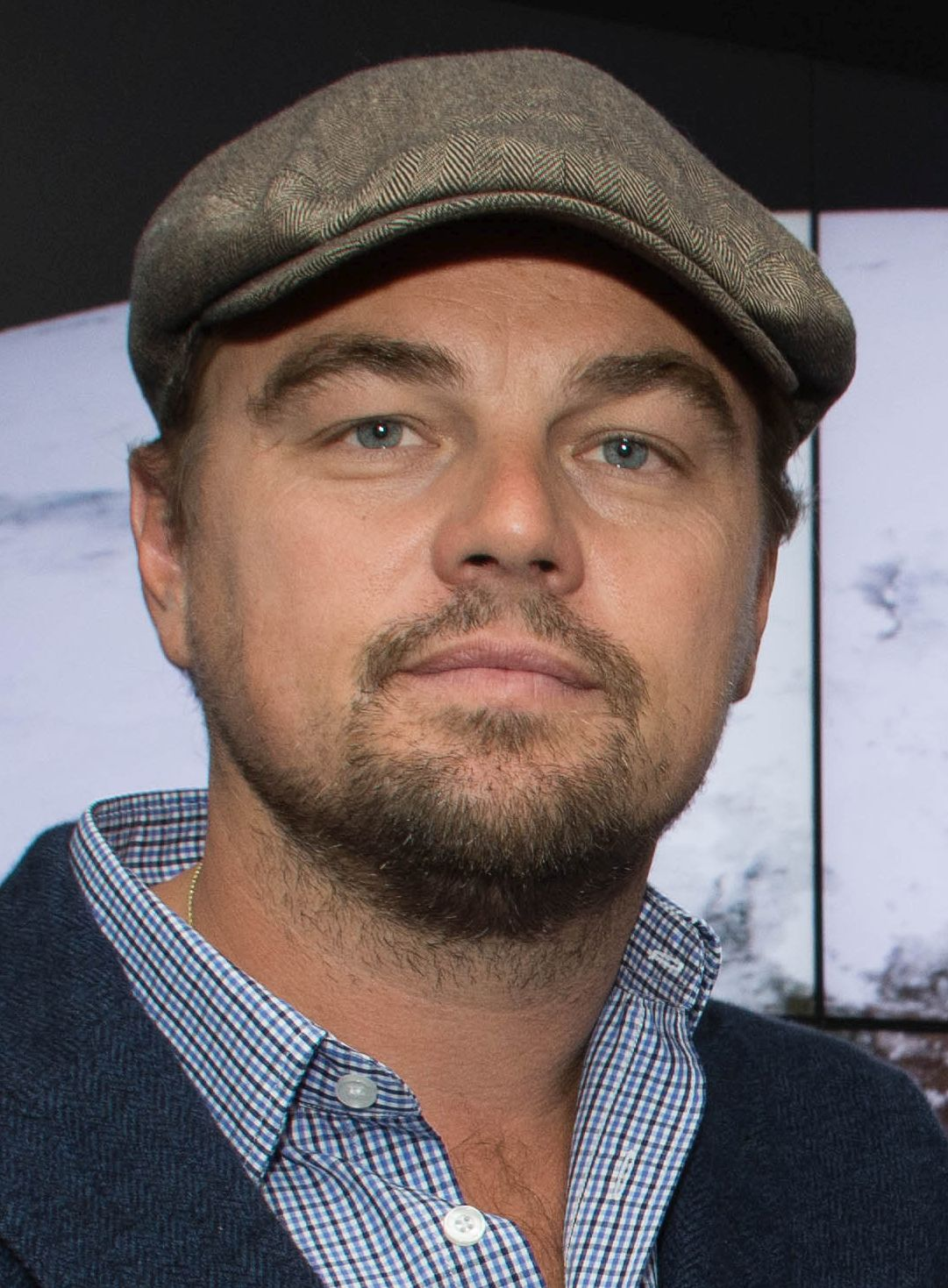
Leonardo DiCaprio, Best Actor winner

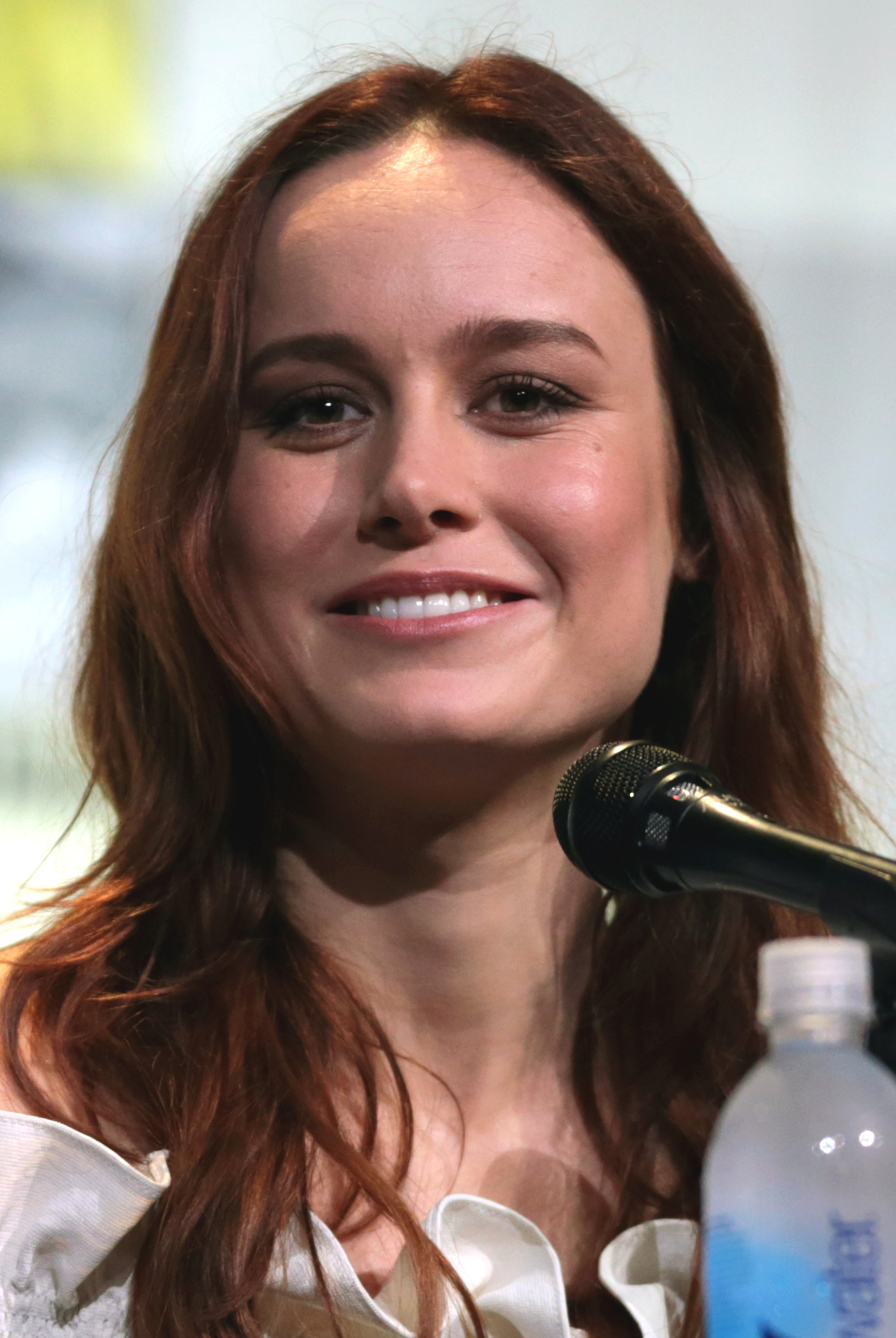
Brie Larson, Best Actress winner

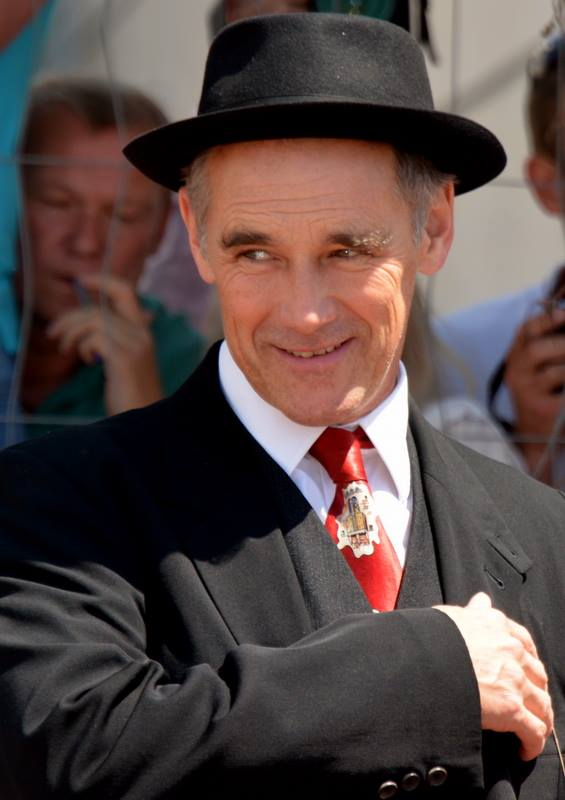
Mark Rylance, Best Supporting Actor winner

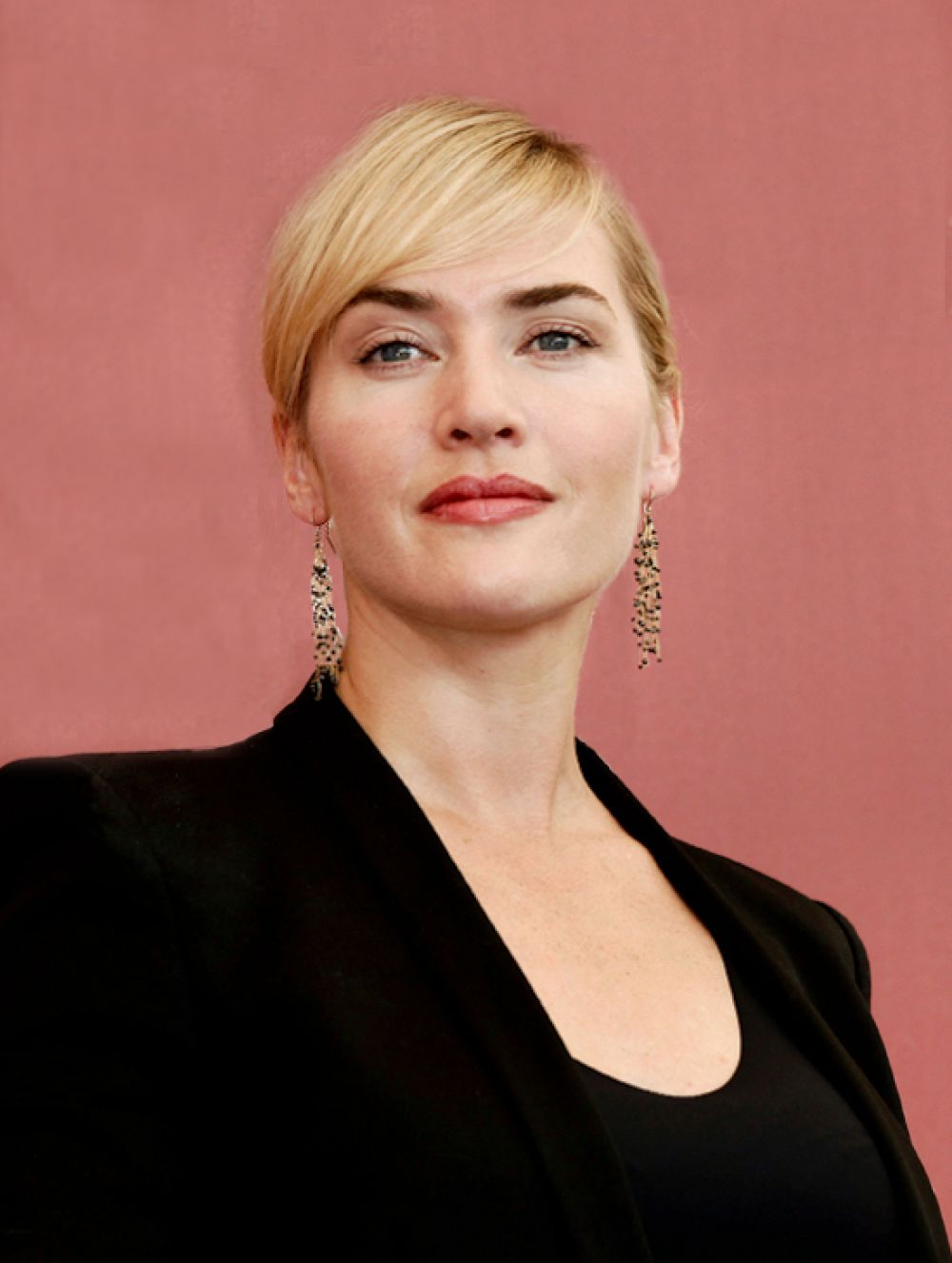
Kate Winslet, Best Supporting Actress winner

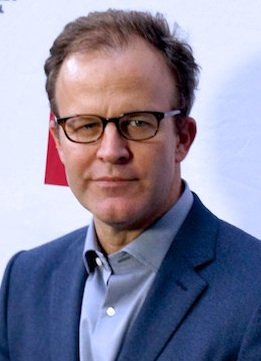
Tom McCarthy, Best Original Screenplay co-winner

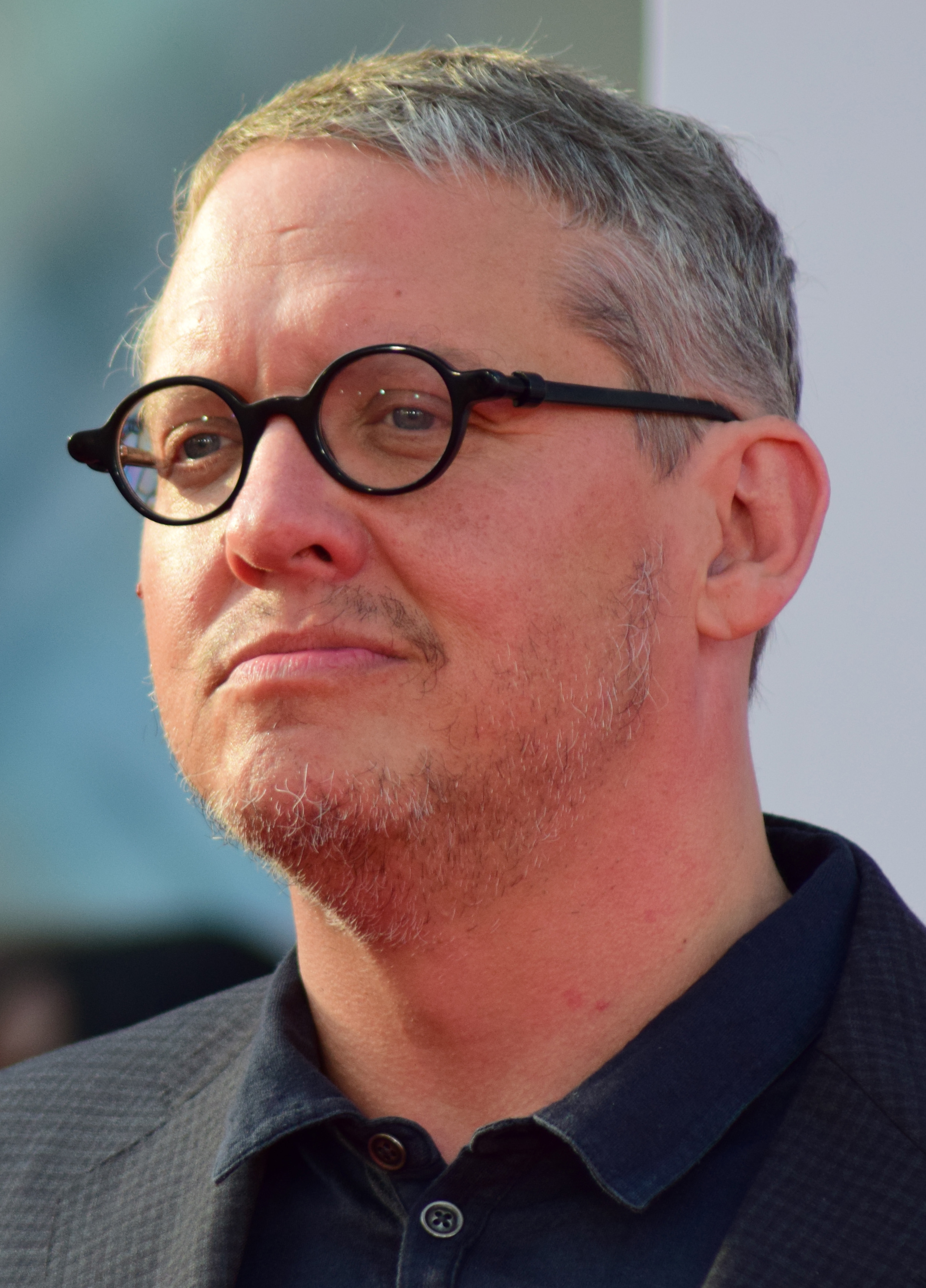
Adam McKay, Best Adapted Screenplay co-winner

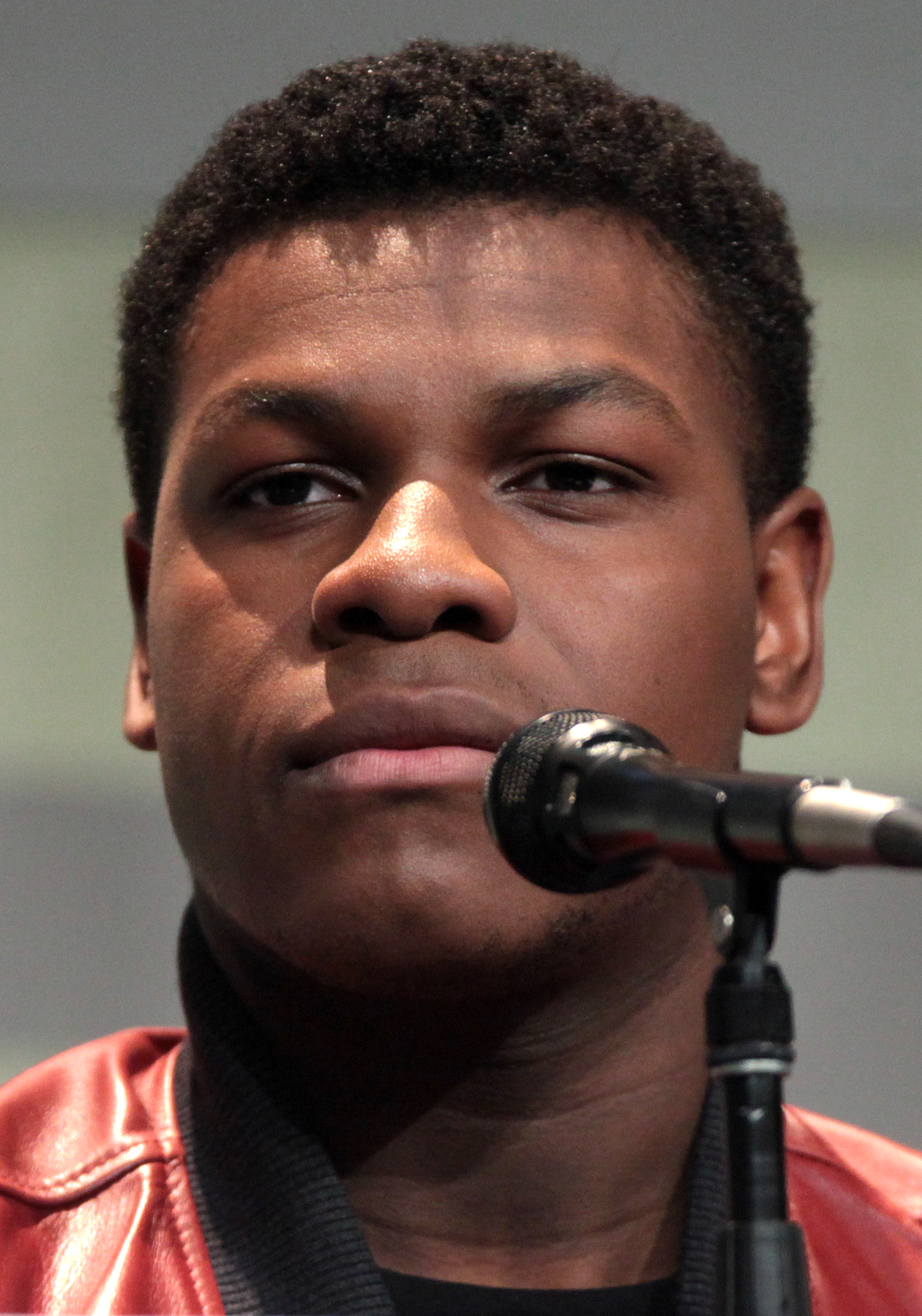
John Boyega, EE Rising Star Award winner

The nominees were announced on 8 January 2016. The winners were announced on 14 February 2016.

=== BAFTA Fellowship ===
- Sidney Poitier

=== Outstanding British Contribution to Cinema ===
- Angels Costumes

| Best Film: The Revenant – Steve Golin, Alejandro González Iñárritu, Arnon Milchan, Mary Parent and Keith Redmon; The Big Short – Dede Gardner, Jeremy Kleiner and Brad Pitt; Bridge of Spies – Kristie Macosko Krieger, Marc Platt and Steven Spielberg; Carol – Elizabeth Karlsen, Christine Vachon and Stephen Woolley; Spotlight – Blye Pagon Faust, Steve Golin, Nicole Rocklin and Michael Sugar | Best Direction: Alejandro González Iñárritu – The Revenant; Todd Haynes – Carol; Adam McKay – The Big Short; Ridley Scott – The Martian; Steven Spielberg – Bridge of Spies |
| Best Actor in a Leading Role: Leonardo DiCaprio – The Revenant as Hugh Glass; Bryan Cranston – Trumbo as Dalton Trumbo; Matt Damon – The Martian as Mark Watney; Michael Fassbender – Steve Jobs as Steve Jobs; Eddie Redmayne – The Danish Girl as Einar Wegener/Lili Elbe | Best Actress in a Leading Role: Brie Larson – Room as Joy Newsome; Cate Blanchett – Carol as Carol Aird; Saoirse Ronan – Brooklyn as Eilis Lacey; Maggie Smith – The Lady in the Van as Miss Mary Shepherd/Margaret Fairchild; Alicia Vikander – The Danish Girl as Gerda Wegener |
| Best Actor in a Supporting Role: Mark Rylance – Bridge of Spies as Rudolf Abel; Christian Bale – The Big Short as Michael Burry; Benicio del Toro – Sicario as Alejandro Gillick; Idris Elba – Beasts of No Nation as Commandant; Mark Ruffalo – Spotlight as Michael Rezendes | Best Actress in a Supporting Role: Kate Winslet – Steve Jobs as Joanna Hoffman; Jennifer Jason Leigh – The Hateful Eight as Daisy Domergue; Rooney Mara – Carol as Therese Belivet; Alicia Vikander – Ex Machina as Ava; Julie Walters – Brooklyn as Mrs. Kehoe |
| Best Original Screenplay: Spotlight – Tom McCarthy and Josh Singer; Bridge of Spies – Matt Charman, Ethan Coen and Joel Coen; Ex Machina – Alex Garland; The Hateful Eight – Quentin Tarantino; Inside Out – Josh Cooley, Pete Docter and Meg LeFauve | Best Adapted Screenplay: The Big Short – Adam McKay and Charles Randolph; Brooklyn – Nick Hornby; Carol – Phyllis Nagy; Room – Emma Donoghue; Steve Jobs – Aaron Sorkin |
| Best Cinematography: The Revenant – Emmanuel Lubezki; Bridge of Spies – Janusz Kamiński; Carol – Edward Lachman; Mad Max: Fury Road – John Seale; Sicario – Roger Deakins | Best Costume Design: Mad Max: Fury Road – Jenny Beavan; Brooklyn – Odile Dicks-Mireaux; Carol – Sandy Powell; Cinderella – Sandy Powell; The Danish Girl – Paco Delgado |
| Best Editing: Mad Max: Fury Road – Margaret Sixel; The Big Short – Hank Corwin; Bridge of Spies – Michael Kahn; The Martian – Pietro Scalia; The Revenant – Stephen Mirrione | Best Makeup and Hair: Mad Max: Fury Road – Damian Martin and Lesley Vanderwalt; Brooklyn – Morna Ferguson and Lorraine Glynn; Carol – Jerry DeCarlo, Patricia Regan and Morag Ross; The Danish Girl – Jan Sewell; The Revenant – Siân Grigg, Duncan Jarman and Robert Pandini |
| Best Original Music: The Hateful Eight – Ennio Morricone; Bridge of Spies – Thomas Newman; The Revenant – Ryuichi Sakamoto and Carsten Nicolai; Sicario – Jóhann Jóhannsson; Star Wars: The Force Awakens – John Williams | Best Production Design: Mad Max: Fury Road – Colin Gibson and Lisa Thompson; Bridge of Spies – Rena DeAngelo, Adam Stockhausen and Bernhard Henrich; Carol – Judy Becker and Heather Loeffler; The Martian – Arthur Max and Celia Bobak; Star Wars: The Force Awakens – Rick Carter, Darren Gilford and Lee Sandales |
| Best Sound: The Revenant – Lon Bender, Chris Duesterdiek, Martin Hernández, Frank A. Montaño, Jon Taylor and Randy Thom; Bridge of Spies – Richard Hymns, Drew Kunin, Andy Nelson and Gary Rydstrom; Mad Max: Fury Road – Scott Hecker, Chris Jenkins, Mark Mangini, Ben Osmo, Gregg Rudloff and David White; The Martian – Paul Massey, Mac Ruth, Oliver Tarney and Mark Taylor; Star Wars: The Force Awakens – David Acord, Andy Nelson, Christopher Scarabosio, Stuart Wilson and Matthew Wood | Best Special Visual Effects: Star Wars: The Force Awakens – Chris Corbould, Roger Guyett, Paul Kavanagh and Neal Scanlan; Ant-Man – Jake Morrison, Greg Steele, Dan Sudick and Alex Wuttke; Ex Machina – Mark Williams Ardington, Sara Bennett, Paul Norris and Andrew Whitehurst; Mad Max: Fury Road – Andrew Jackson, Dan Oliver, Andy Williams and Tom Wood; The Martian – Chris Lawrence, Tim Ledbury, Richard Stammers and Steven Warner |
| Outstanding British Film: Brooklyn – John Crowley, Finola Dwyer, Nick Hornby and Amanda Posey; 45 Years – Tristan Goligher and Andrew Haigh; Amy – James Gay-Rees and Asif Kapadia; The Danish Girl – Tom Hooper, Tim Bevan, Eric Fellner, Anne Harrison, Gail Mutrux and Lucinda Coxon; Ex Machina – Alex Garland, Andrew Macdonald and Allon Reich; The Lobster – Yorgos Lanthimos, Ceci Dempsey, Ed Guiney, Lee Magiday and Efthymis Filippou | Outstanding Debut by a British Writer, Director or Producer: Theeb – Naji Abu Nowar (Writer/Director) and Rupert Lloyd (Producer); Ex Machina – Alex Garland (Director); Second Coming – debbie tucker green (Writer/Director); The Survivalist – Stephen Fingleton (Writer/Director); A Syrian Love Story – Sean McAllister (Director/Producer) and Elhum Shakerifar (Producer) |
| Best Short Animation: Edmond – Nina Gantz and Emilie Jouffroy; Manoman – Simon Cartwright and Kamilla Kristiane Hodal; Prologue – Imogen Sutton and Richard Williams | Best Short Film: Operator – Caroline Bartleet and Rebecca Morgan; Elephant – Nick Helm, Alex Moody and Esther Smith; Mining Poems or Odes – Jack Cocker and Callum Rice; Over – Jorn Threifall and Jeremy Bannister; Samuel-613 – Cheyenne Conway and Billy Lumby |
| Best Animated Film: Inside Out – Pete Docter; Minions – Pierre Coffin and Kyle Balda; Shaun the Sheep Movie – Mark Burton and Richard Starzak | Best Documentary: Amy – James Gay-Rees and Asif Kapadia; Cartel Land – Matthew Heineman and Tom Yellin; He Named Me Malala – Davis Guggenheim, Laurie MacDonald and Walter F. Parkes; Listen to Me Marlon – John Battsek, George Chignell, R. J. Cutler and Stevan Riley; Sherpa – Bridget Ikin, Jennifer Peedom and John Smithson |
| Best Film Not in the English Language: Wild Tales – Damián Szifron; The Assassin – Hou Hsiao-hsien; Force Majeure – Ruben Östlund; Theeb – Naji Abu Nowar; Timbuktu – Abderrahmane Sissako | Rising Star Award: John Boyega; Taron Egerton; Dakota Johnson; Brie Larson; Bel Powley |

== Ceremony information ==
The ceremony was broadcast on BBC One at 9 p.m. GMT, around two hours later than the actual ceremony. For the eleventh time, Stephen Fry acted as the host. The ceremony commenced with a segment commemorating the year in film, which was accompanied by the song "Heroes" by David Bowie, who had died the previous month. Highlighting that the ceremony was being held on Valentine's Day, the ceremony showed a kiss cam where random celebrities such as Dame Maggie Smith and Leonardo DiCaprio were persuaded by Fry to kiss each other. Fry also received a number of negative comments after he said of Best Costume Design winner Jenny Beavan (Mad Max: Fury Road) as "Only one of the great cinematic costume designers would come to an awards ceremony dressed as a bag lady". He subsequently deleted his Twitter account following criticism of his joke.

A number of presenters referred to the lack of diversity at the Academy Awards. Rebel Wilson and Sacha Baron Cohen both made jokes referring to the controversy. Sidney Poitier was not present to collect his fellowship due to ill health. Jamie Foxx and Poitier's daughter, Sydney Tamiia Poitier, presented the award to him in person at his home in Los Angeles. Noel Clarke, Lulu, and Oprah Winfrey paid tribute to him in a filmed segment.

The In Memoriam section featured Alan Rickman, Melissa Mathison, Andrew Lesnie, Maureen O'Hara, Gayle Griffiths, Haskell Wexler, Colin Welland, James Horner, David Bowie, Ron Moody, June Randall, Julie Harris, Frank Finlay, Philip French, Vilmos Zsigmond, Albert Maysles, Richard Johnson, Wes Craven, Jacques Rivette, Penelope Houston, Tommie Manderson, Christopher Wood, Saeed Jaffrey, Sheila Sim and Sir Christopher Lee.

== Statistics ==
Films that received multiple nominations
| Nominations | Film |
|---|---|
| 9 | Bridge of Spies |
| 9 | Carol |
| 8 | The Revenant |
| 7 | Mad Max: Fury Road |
| 6 | Brooklyn |
| 6 | The Martian |
| 5 | The Big Short |
| 5 | The Danish Girl |
| 5 | Ex Machina |
| 4 | Star Wars: The Force Awakens |
| 3 | The Hateful Eight |
| 3 | Sicario |
| 3 | Spotlight |
| 3 | Steve Jobs |
| 2 | Amy |
| 2 | Inside Out |
| 2 | Room |
| 2 | Theeb |

Films that received multiple awards
| Awards | Film |
|---|---|
| 5 | The Revenant |
| 4 | Mad Max: Fury Road |

== In Memoriam ==
- Alan Rickman
- Melissa Mathison
- Andrew Lesnie
- Maureen O'Hara
- Omar Sharif
- Gayle Griffiths
- Haskell Wexler
- Colin Welland
- James Horner
- David Bowie
- Ron Moody
- June Randall
- Julie Harris
- Frank Finlay
- Philip French
- Vilmos Zsigmond
- Albert Maysles
- Richard Johnson
- Wes Craven
- Jacques Rivette
- Penelope Houston
- Tommie Manderson
- Christopher Wood
- Saeed Jaffrey
- Sheila Sim
- Christopher Lee

== See also ==
- 5th AACTA International Awards
- 88th Academy Awards
- 41st César Awards
- 21st Critics' Choice Awards
- 68th Directors Guild of America Awards
- 29th European Film Awards
- 73rd Golden Globe Awards
- 36th Golden Raspberry Awards
- 30th Goya Awards
- 31st Independent Spirit Awards
- 21st Lumière Awards
- 6th Magritte Awards
- 3rd Platino Awards
- 27th Producers Guild of America Awards
- 20th Satellite Awards
- 42nd Saturn Awards
- 22nd Screen Actors Guild Awards
- 68th Writers Guild of America Awards
