= 5th AACTA Awards =

Australian film and television awards ceremony

- Date: 30 November 2015 and 9 December 2015
- Site: The Star Event Centre; Sydney, New South Wales

Highlights
- Best Film: Mad Max: Fury Road
- Most awards: Mad Max: Fury Road (7)
- Most nominations: The Dressmaker (13)

Television coverage
- Network: Seven Network; Arena
- Ratings: 419,000

The 5th Australian Academy of Cinema and Television Arts Awards (generally known as AACTA Awards) are a series of awards which includes the 5th AACTA Awards Luncheon, the 5th AACTA Awards ceremony and the 5th AACTA International Awards. The former two events were held at The Star Event Centre, in Sydney, New South Wales in late 2015. Presented by the Australian Academy of Cinema and Television Arts (AACTA), the awards celebrate the best in Australian feature film, television, documentary and short film productions of 2015. The AACTA Awards ceremony televised on Seven Network for the fourth year running. The 5th AACTA Awards are a continuum of the Australian Film Institute Awards (known as the AFI Awards), established in 1958 and presented until 2010 after which it was rebranded the AACTA Awards when the Australian Film Institute (AFI) established AACTA in 2011.

The nominees were announced during a press conference on 31 October 2015 at The Star hôtel in Sydney. The Dressmaker received the most feature-film nominations with thirteen, earning a nomination in most of the categories.

== Nominees and winners ==
The nominees for feature-films and Television were announced during a press conference on 29 October 2015 in Sydney. Of the nominees, Jocelyn Moorhouse's revenge drama The Dressmaker received the most feature-film nominations with thirteen, including Best Film, Best Direction, Best Lead Actress, Best Supporting Actress, Best Cinematography, Best Editing, Best Production Design and Best Costume Design. The winners were announced on 9 December 2015.

=== Feature film ===
Best Film	Best Direction
Mad Max: Fury Road – Doug Mitchell, George Miller, and P. J. Voeten; The Dressmaker – Sue Maslin; Holding the Man – Kylie Du Fresne; Last Cab to Darwin – Greg Duffy, Lisa Duff, and Jeremy Sims; Paper Planes – Robert Connolly, Maggie Miles, and Liz Kearney	George Miller – Mad Max: Fury Road; Jocelyn Moorhouse – The Dressmaker; Neil Armfield – Holding the Man; Jeremy Sims – Last Cab to Darwin
Best Original Screenplay	Best Adapted Screenplay
Paper Planes – Robert Connolly, and Steve Worland; Cut Snake – Blake Ayshford; Kill Me Three Times – James McFarland; Mad Max: Fury Road – George Miller, Brendan McCarthy, and Nico Lathouris	Last Cab to Darwin – Reg Cribb and Jeremy Sims, based on the play of the same name by Reg Cribb; Holding the Man – Tommy Murphy, based on the memoir of the same name by Timothy Conigrave; Ruben Guthrie – Brendan Cowell, based on the play of the same name by Brendan Cowell
Best Lead Actor	Best Lead Actress
Michael Caton – Last Cab to Darwin as Rex; Patrick Brammall – Ruben Guthrie as Ruben Guthrie; Ryan Corr – Holding the Man as Timothy Conigrave; Sullivan Stapleton – Cut Snake as James	Kate Winslet – The Dressmaker as Myrtle "Tilly" Dunnage; Robyn Butler – Now Add Honey as Caroline Morgan; Ningali Lawford – Last Cab to Darwin as Polly; Charlize Theron – Mad Max: Fury Road as Imperator Furiosa
Best Supporting Actor	Best Supporting Actress
Hugo Weaving – The Dressmaker as Sergeant Farrat; Mark Coles Smith – Last Cab to Darwin as Tilly; Alex Dimitriades – Ruben Guthrie as Damian; Anthony LaPaglia – Holding the Man as Bob Caleo	Judy Davis – The Dressmaker as Molly Dunnage; Emma Hamilton – Last Cab to Darwin as Julie; Deborah Mailman – Paper Planes as Maureen; Sarah Snook – The Dressmaker as Gertrude "Trudy" Pratt
Best Cinematography	Best Editing
Mad Max: Fury Road – John Seale ASC ACS; The Dressmaker – Donald McAlpine ACS ASC; Last Cab to Darwin – Steve Arnold ACS; Oddball – Damian Wyvill ACS	Mad Max: Fury Road – Margaret Sixel; Cut Snake – Andy Canny; The Dressmaker – Jill Bilcock ACE ASE; Holding the Man – Dany Cooper ASE
Best Original Music Score	Best Sound
Mad Max: Fury Road – Junkie XL; The Dressmaker – David Hirschfelder; Paper Planes – Nigel Westlake; Partisan – Daniel Lopatin	Mad Max: Fury Road – Ben Osmo, David White, Chris Jenkins, Gregg Rudloff, Wayne Pashley, and Mark Mangini; The Dressmaker – Andrew Ramage, Glenn Newnham, Chris Goodes CAS, David Williams, Mario Vaccaro, and Alex Francis; Paper Planes – Chris Goodes CAS, James Ashton, Emma Bortignon, and Trevor Hope; Partisan – Robert Mackenzie, and Dane Cody
Best Production Design	Best Costume Design
Mad Max: Fury Road – Colin Gibson; Cut Snake – Josephine Ford; The Dressmaker – Roger Ford; Partisan – Steven Jones-Evans APDG, and Sarah Cyngler	The Dressmaker – Marion Boyce, and Margot Wilson; Cut Snake – Cappi Ireland; Mad Max: Fury Road – Jenny Beavan; Partisan – Sarah Cyngler

=== Television ===
Best Drama Series	Best Comedy Series
Glitch – Tony Ayres, Louise Fox and Ewan Burnett (ABC); Love Child (Season 2) – Tom Hoffie (Nine Network); Miss Fisher's Murder Mysteries (Season 3) – Fiona Eagger and Deb Cox (ABC); Wentworth (Season 3) – Jo Porter and Amanda Crittenden (FOXTEL)	Shaun Micallef's Mad as Hell – Shaun Micallef, Peter Beck (ABC); Danger 5 – Kate Croser, Dario Russo (SBS); Sammy J & Randy in Ricketts Lane – Laura Waters, Andrea Denholm, Paul Walton, and Peter Helliar (ABC); Utopia – Michael Hirsh, Santo Cilauro, Tom Gleisner, Rob Sitch (ABC)
Best Children's Series	Best Light Entertainment Series
Ready for This – Darren Dale, Miranda Dear and Joanna Werner (ABC3); Little Lunch – Robyn Butler and Wayne Hope (ABC3); The New Adventures of Figaro Pho – Daniel Fill, Frank Verheggen and Luke Jurevicius (ABC3); Nowhere Boys Series 2 – Beth Frey (ABC3)	The Weekly with Charlie Pickering – Charlie Pickering, Kevin Whyte, Chris Walker and Frank Bruzzese (ABC); Dirty Laundry Live – Tarni James, Peter Lawler, Rachel Millar and Richard Kelly (ABC); Judith Lucy is All Woman – Anna Bateman, Judith Lucy (ABC); Julia Zemiro's Home Delivery – Damian Davis, Polly Connolly and Nick Murray (ABC)
Best Reality Series	Best Telefeature, Mini Series or Short Run Series
MasterChef Australia – Margaret Bashfield, Marty Benson, Tim Toni and Rob Wallace (Network Ten); My Kitchen Rules (Season 6) – Rikkie Proost, Evan Wilkes and Matt Apps (Seven Network); The Real Housewives of Melbourne (Season 2) – Kylie Washington, Lisa Potasz, Virginia Hodgson (FOXTEL); The Voice – Richard Rietveld (Nine Network); The X Factor – Digby Mitchell (Seven Network)	Peter Allen: Not the Boy Next Door – Kerrie Mainwaring and Rory Callaghan (Seven Network); Banished – Sita Williams, Emile Sherman, Iain Canning, Jamie Laurenson and Brett Popplewell (FOXTEL); The Principal – Ian Collie (SBS); The Secret River – Stephen Luby (ABC)
Best Direction in a Drama or Comedy	Best Direction in a Television Light Entertainment or Reality Series
Shawn Seet – Peter Allen: Not the Boy Next Door (Épisode 2) (Seven Network); Jeffrey Walker – Banished (Épisode 7) (FOXTEL); Michael Rymer – Deadline Gallipoli (Part 1) (FOXTEL); Kriv Stenders – The Principal (Épisode 1) (SBS)	Seth Larney – Hipsters (Épisode 1) (SBS2); Anna Bateman – Judith Lucy is All Woman (Épisode 2) (ABC); Damian Davis – Julia Zemiro's Home Delivery (Épisode 7) (ABC); Stamatia Maroupas – Kitchen Cabinet (Épisode 7) (ABC)
Best Lead Actor – Drama	Best Lead Actress – Drama
Joel Jackson – Peter Allen: Not the Boy Next Door (Seven Network); Wayne Blair – Redfern Now (ABC); Joel Jackson – Deadline Gallipoli (FOXTEL); Oliver Jackson-Cohen – The Secret River (ABC)	Pamela Rabe – Wentworth (Season 3) (FOXTEL); Deborah Mailman – Redfern Now (ABC); Peta Sergeant – House of Hancock (Nine Network); Sarah Snook – The Secret River (ABC)
Best Guest or Supporting Actor – Drama	Best Guest or Supporting Actress – Drama
Ky Baldwin – Peter Allen: Not the Boy Next Door (Episode 1) (Seven Network); John Bach – Gallipoli (Episode 6) (Nine Network); Lachy Hulme – The Secret River (Part 1) (ABC); Rahel Romahn – The Principal (Episode 2) (SBS)	Sigrid Thornton – Peter Allen: Not the Boy Next Door (Épisode 1) (Seven Network); Harriet Dyer – Love Child (Season 2) (Episode 3) (Nine Network); Rarriwuy Hick – Redfern Now (ABC); Hannah Monson – Glitch (Episode 4) (ABC)
Best Comedy Performance	Best Screenplay in Television
Celia Pacquola – Utopia (ABC); Nathan Lovejoy – Sammy J & Randy in Ricketts Lane (ABC); Randy – Sammy J & Randy in Ricketts Lane (ABC); Emily Taheny – Shaun Micallef's Mad as Hell (ABC2)	Michael Miller – Peter Allen: Not the Boy Next Door (Épisode 2) (Seven Network); Jacquelin Perske and Shaun Grant – Deadline Gallipoli (Part 1) (FOXTEL); Kristen Dunphy – The Principal (Épisode 1) (SBS); Santo Cilauro, Tom Gleisner, Rob Sitch – Utopia (Épisode 1) (ABC)
Best Cinematography in Television	Best Editing in Television
Geoffrey Hall – Deadline Gallipoli (FOXTEL); Martin McGrath – Banished (Épisode 6) (FOXTEL); Mark Wareham – Redfern Now (ABC); Bruce Young – The Secret River (Épisode 1) (ABC)	Nicholas Holmes – Redfern Now (ABC); Dany Cooper and Martin Connor – Deadline Gallipoli (Part 1) (FOXTEL); Annabelle Johnson – Little Lunch (Épisode 5) (ABC3); Deborah Peart – Peter Allen: Not the Boy Next Door (Épisode 1) (Seven Network)
Best Sound in Television	Best Original Music Score in Television
Des Kenneally, Robert Mackenzie, Liam Price, Jed Dodge, Justine Angus and John Simpson – Deadline Gallipoli (Par 1) (FOXTEL); Paul 'Salty' Brincat, Gary Desmond and Dan Johnson – Banished (Épisode 6) (FOXTEL); Grant Shepherd, Ashley Irwin, Ian Neilson, Ben Anderson, Nigel Croydon, Robert Sullivan – Peter Allen: Not the Boy Next Door (Épisode 1) (Seven Network); Rainier Davenport, Ian McLoughlin CAS, Wes Chew, Tom Herdman, Annie Breslin and Blair Slater – Redfern Now (ABC)	Cornel Wilczek – Glitch (ABC); David Bridie – Deadline Gallipoli (Part 1) (FOXTEL); Antony Partos – Redfern Now (ABC); Burkhard Dallwitz – The Secret River (Part 1) (ABC)
Best Production Design in Television	Best Costume Design in Television
Herbert Pinter – The Secret River (Part 1) (ABC); Claire Kenny – Banished (Épisode 6) (FOXTEL); Pete Baxter – Deadline Gallipoli (Part 1) (FOXTEL); Tim Ferrier – Peter Allen: Not the Boy Next Door (Épisode 1) (Seven Network)	Jenny Miles – Peter Allen: Not the Boy Next Door (Épisode 1) (Seven Network); Shareen Beringer – House of Hancock (Part 1) (Nine Network); Marion Boyce – Miss Fisher's Murder Mysteries (Épisode 1) (ABC); Edie Kurzer – The Secret River (ABC)

=== Documentary ===
Best Feature Length Documentary	Best Documentary Television Program
That Sugar Film – Nick Batzias and Damon Gameau; Gayby Baby – Charlotte Mars; Only the Dead – Patrick McDonald and Michael Ware; Sherpa – Bridget Ikin and John Smithson; Women He's Undressed - Damien Parer and Gillian Armstrong	Deborah Masters, Sarah Ferguson – The Killing Season (ABC); Jo-anne McGowan – Between a Frock and a Hard Place (ABC); Richard Kuipers – The Cambodian Space Project (ABC); Harry Bardwell, Kelrick Martin – Prison Songs (SBS)
Best Direction in a Documentary	Best Cinematography in a Documentary
Only the Dead – Bill Guttentag, Michael Ware; The Killing Season (ABC) – Deborah Masters; Prison Songs (SBS) – Kelrick Martin; Uranium - Twisting the Dragon's Tail – Wain Fimeri, Steve Westh	Life on the Reef (Épisode 1) (ABC) – Nick Robinson, Luke Peterson and Jon Shaw; The Killing Season – Louie Eroglu; Prison Songs – Torstein Dyrting; Sherpa – Renan Ozturk, Hugh Miller and Ken Sauls
Best Editing in a Documentary	Best Sound in a Documentary
Only the Dead – Jane Moran; The Cambodian Space Project – Andrea Lang; The Killing Season (Épisode 2) (ABC) – Lile Judickas; Sherpa – Christian Gazal	Only the Dead – Steve Burgess, Leah Katz, Andy Wright and Chris Goodes; The Cambodian Space Project – Keith Thomas; Life on the Reef (Épisode 1) – Caspar Mazzotti, Craig Beckett, Dan Miau and Terry Meehan; Prison Songs – Glenn Martin and Kim Lord
Best Original Music Score in a Documentary
Sherpa – Antony Partos; Only the Dead – Michael Yezerski; Prison Songs (SBS) – Shellie Morris, Casey Bennetto and Tim Cole; Uranium - Twisting the Dragon's Tail – Dale Cornelius

=== Short film ===
Best Short Animation	Best Short Fiction Film
Ernie Biscuit – Adam Elliot; The Meek – Laura DiMaio and Joe Brumm; The Orchestra – Mikey Hill and Melanie Brunt; The Story of Percival Pilts – John Lewis and Janette Goodey	Nulla Nulla – Dylan River and Tanith Glynn-Maloney; Flat Daddy – Annie Kinnane and Matt Holcomb; Karroyul – Kelrick Martin, Jaclyn Hewer and Melissa Kelly; Reg Makes Contact – Corrie Chen, Jiao Chen and Raquelle David

=== Other ===
Best Visual Effects or Animation	People's Choice Award for Favourite Australian Film
Mad Max: Fury Road – Andrew Jackson, Holly Radcliffe, Dan Oliver, Andy Williams, Tom Wood and Fiona Crawford; Avengers: Age of Ultron – Christopher Townsend, Ryan Stafford, Paul Butterworth and Matt Estela; Pan – Chas Jarrett, Dan Barrow, Mark Holt, Marc Varisco and Alana Newell; Ted 2 – Glenn Melenhorst and Ineke Majoor	The Dressmaker – Sue Maslin; Last Cab to Darwin – Greg Duffy, Lisa Duff, and Jeremy Sims; Mad Max: Fury Road – Doug Mitchell, George Miller, and P. J. Voeten; Oddball – Sheila Hanahan, Stephen Kearney and Richard Keddie; Paper Planes – Robert Connolly, Maggie Miles, and Liz Kearney

== Productions with multiple nominations ==
=== Feature film ===
The following feature films received multiple nominations.

- Thirteen: The Dressmaker
- Twelve: Mad Max: Fury Road
- Nine: Last Cab to Darwin
- Six: Paper Planes, Holding the Man
- Five: Cut Snake
- Four: Partisan
- Three: Ruben Guthrie
- Two: Oddball
