= 14th Visual Effects Society Awards =

US film and TV awards ceremony in 2016

14th Visual Effects Society Awards

February 2, 2016

Best Visual Effects in a Photoreal Feature:
Star Wars: The Force Awakens

Best Visual Effects in a Photoreal Episode:
Game of Thrones – The Dance of Dragons

The 14th Visual Effects Society Awards were held in Los Angeles at the Beverly Hilton Hotel on February 2, 2016, in honor to the best visual effects in film and television of 2015. Nominations were announced January 12, 2016.

== Winners and nominees ==
(winners in bold)

=== Honorary Awards ===
Lifetime Achievement Award:

- **Ridley Scott**

VES Visionary Award:

- **Syd Mead**

=== Film ===
Outstanding Visual Effects in a Photoreal Feature	Outstanding Supporting Visual Effects in a Photoreal Feature
**Star Wars: The Force Awakens** – Roger Guyett, Luke O'Byrne, Patrick Tubach, Paul Kavanagh, Chris Corbould: Furious 7 – Mike Wassel, Karen Murphy, Martin Hill, Kevin McIlwain, Dan Sudick; Mad Max: Fury Road – Andrew Jackson, Holly Radcliffe, Tom Wood, Dan Oliver, Andy Williams; The Martian – Richard Stammers, Barrie Hemsley, Matt Sloan, Chris Lawrence, Steven Warner; San Andreas – Colin Strause, Randall Starr, Bryan Grill, Nordin Rahhati, Brian Cox	**The Revenant** – Rich McBride, Ivy Agregan, Jason Smith, Nicolas Chevallier, Cameron Waldbauer: Bridge of Spies – Sven Martin, Jennifer Meislohn, Charlie Noble, Sean Stranks, Gerd Nefzer; Everest – Dadi Einarsson, Roma O-Connor, Matthias Bjarnsasson, Richard Van Den Bergh; In The Heart of the Sea – Jody Johnson, Leslie Lerman, Sean Stranks, Bryan Hirota, Mark Holt; The Walk – Kevin Baillie, Camille Cellucci, Viktor Muller, Sebastien Moreau
Outstanding Visual Effects in an Animated Feature	Outstanding Animated Performance in a Photoreal Feature
**The Good Dinosaur** – Sanjay Bakshi, Denise Ream, Michael Venturini, Jon Reisch: Anomalisa – Derek Smith, Rosa Tran, Joe Passarelli, John Joyce; Hotel Transylvania 2 – Karl Herbst, Skye Lyons, Alan Hawkins, Genndy Tartakovsky; Inside Out – Michael Fong, Jonas Rivera, Victor Navone, Paul Mendoza; The Peanuts Movie – Steve Martino, Michael J. Travers, Nick Bruno, Scott Carroll	**The Revenant – The Bear** – Matt Shumway, Gaelle Morand, Karin Cooper, Leandro Estebecorena: Avengers: Age of Ultron – Hulk – Jakub Pistecky, Lana Lan, John Walker, Sean Comer; Chappie – Chappie – Earl Fast, Chris Harvey, Mark Wendell, Robert Bourgeault; Star Wars: The Force Awakens – Maz – Joel Bodin, Arslan Elver, Ian Comley, Stephen Cullingford
Outstanding Animated Performance in an Animated Feature	Outstanding Created Environment in a Photoreal Feature
**Inside Out – Joy** – Shawn Krause, Tanja Krampfert, Jacob Merrell, Alexis Angelidis: The Good Dinosaur – Spot – Ana Gabriela Lacaze, Jacob Brooks, Lou Hamou-Lhadj, Mark C. Harris; The Peanuts Movie – Charlie Brown – Matthew Doble, Steve Vanseth, Stephen Gressak, Nikki Tomaino; The Peanuts Movie – Snoopy – Jeff Gabor, Joseph Antonuccio, Ignacio Barrios, Sabine Heller	**Star Wars: The Force Awakens – Falcon Chase/Graveyard** – Yanick Dusseault, Mike Wood, Justin van der Lek, Quentin Marmier: Ant-Man – The Microverse – Florian Witzel, Taylor Shaw, Alexis Hall, Heath Kraynak; Jurassic World – Jungle Chase – Martyn Culpitt, Jao Sita, Yuta Shimizu, Michael Billette; Tomorrowland – Tomorrowland Center – Barry Williams, Greg Kegel, Quentin Marmier, Thang Lee; The Walk – World Trade Center – Jim Gibbs, Brian Flora, Laurent Tallefer, Pavel Kolar
Outstanding Created Environment in an Animated Feature	Outstanding Virtual Cinematography in a Photoreal Project
**The Good Dinosaur – The Farm** – David Munier, Matthew Webb, Matt Kuruc, Tom Miller: Inside Out – Imagination Land – Amy L. Allen, Steve Karski, Eric Andraos, Jose L. Ramos Serrano; Shaun the Sheep Movie – Under the Arches – Matt Perry, Charles Copping, Alfred Llupia Perez, Andy Brown; The Peanuts Movie – Charlie Brown's Neighborhood – Jon Townley, Angel Camacho-Torres, Cleveland Hibbert, Ken Lee	**Star Wars: The Force Awakens – Falcon Chase/Graveyard** – Paul Kavanagh, Colin Benoit, Susumu Yukuhiro, Greg Salter: Ant-Man – Macro Action – James Baker, Alex Kahn, Thomas Luff, Rebecca Baehler; Mission Impossible: Rogue Nation – Underwater Torus Chamber -Vincent Aupetit, Margaux Durand-Rival, Christopher Anciaume, Robert Elswit; The Walk – Towers Walk – Shawn Hull, Suzanne Cipolletti, Laurent Taillefer, Dariusz Wolski
Outstanding Models in a Photoreal or Animated Project	Outstanding Effects Simulations in a Photoreal Feature
**Star Wars: The Force Awakens – BB-8** -Joshua Lee, Matthew Denton, Landis Fields, Cyrus Jam: Avengers: Age of Ultron – Hulkbuster – Howie Weed, Robert Marinic, Daniel Gonzalez, Myriam Catrin; Everest – Mt. Everest – Matthias Bjarnasson, Olafur Haraldsson, Kjartan Hardarson, Peter Arnorsson; Jurassic World -Indominius Rex – Steve Jubinville, Martin Murphy, Aaron Gret, Kevin Reuter	**Mad Max: Fury Road – Toxic Storm** – Dan Bethell, Clinton Downs, Chris Young: Avengers: Age of Ultron – Hulk vs. Hulkbuster -Michael Balog, Jim Van Allen, Florent Andorra, Georg Kaltenbrunner; San Andreas – Hoover Dam/San Francisco Tsunami – Joe Scarr, Lukas Lepicovsky, Yves D-Incau, Marcel Kern; San Andreas – Los Angeles Destruction -Remy Torre, Marc Horsfield, Niall Flinn, Victor Grant; Star Wars: The Force Awakens – Starkiller Base – Rick Hankins, Dan Bornstein, John Doublestein, Gary Wu
Outstanding Effects Simulations in an Animated Feature	Outstanding Compositing in a Photoreal Feature
**The Good Dinosaur** – Stephen Marshall, Magnus Wrenninge, Michael Hall, Hemagiri Arumugam: Home – Greg Gladstone, Michael Losure, Chris De St Jeor, Alex Timchenkio; Inside Out – Amit Baadkar, Dave Hale, Vincent Serritella, Paul Mendoza; The Peanuts Movie – Alen Lai, Ilan Gabai, Chris Chapman, Douglas Seiden	**The Revenant** – Donny Rausch, Alan Travis, Charles Lai, TC Harrison: Mad Max: Fury Road – Lindsay Adams, Matthew Wynne, Chris Davies, Phil Outen; San Andreas – Los Angeles Destruction – Sandro Blattnber, Hamish Schumacher, Nicholas Kim, Mario Rokicki; Star Wars: The Force Awakens – Jay Cooper, Marian Mavrovic, Jean Lapointe, Alex Prichard; Tomorrowland – Francois Lambert, Jean Lapointe, Peter Demarest, Conny Fauser

=== Television ===
Outstanding Visual Effects in a Photoreal Episode	Outstanding Supporting Visual Effects in a Photoreal Episode
**Game of Thrones** – "**The Dance of Dragons**" – Joe Bauer, Steve Kullback Eric Carney, Derek Spears, Stuart Brisdon: Childhood's End – "Night Three" – Kevin Blank, Adica Manis, Niklas Jacobson, Glenn Melenhorst; Jonathan Strange & Mr. Norrell – "Arabella" – Jean-Claude Deguara, Natalie Reid, Nicolas Hernandez, Sara Bennett; Nezlamna – "Sea Dogfight" – Dmitriy Ovcharenko, Igor Klimovsky, Egor Borschevsky, Vladimir Mikheyenko; The Strain – "Identity" – Dennis Berardi, Luke Groves, Matt Glover, Trey Harrell, Warren Appleby	**Vikings** – "**To The Gates**" – Dominic Remane, Bill Halliday, Paul Wishart, Ovidiu Cinazan, Paul Byrne: Black Sails – "XVIII" – Erik Henry, Annemarie Griggs, Kevin Rafferty, Aladino Debert, Paul Stephenson; Agent Carter – "Now is Not the End" – Sheena Duggal, Addie Manis, Richard Bluff, Jayesh Dalal, Kenneth C. Clark; Daredevil – "Speak of the Devil" – Bryan Godwin, David Van Dyke, Karl Coyner, Julie Long, Johan Kunz; Penny Dreadful – "And They Were Enemies" – James Cooper, Bill Halliday, Sarah McMurdo, Mai-Ling Lee
Outstanding Visual Effects in a Commercial	Outstanding Animated Performance in an Episode, Commercial or Real-Time Project
**SSE – Pier** – Neil Davies, Tim Lyall, Hitesh Patel, Jorge Montiel: Audi – Birth – Andrew Proctor, Gemma Humphries, Mike Chapman, Gianluca Di Marco; Halo 5 – The Hunt Begins – Benjamin Walsh, Pip Malone, Brian Burke, Ian Holland; Game of War – Rooftop Alliance – David Lawson, Erin Hincke, Becky Porter, Krystal Sae Eua; IKEA – T-Shirts – Diarmid Harrison Murray, Julie Evans, Tom Harding, Tim van Hussen	**SSE – Pier – Orangutan** – Jorge Montiel, Sauce Vilas, Philippe Moine, Sam Driscoll: Game of Thrones – "The Dance of Dragons" -Drogon Arena Rescue – James Kinnings, Michael Holzi, Joseph Hoback, Matt Derksen; Game of Thrones – "Mother's Mercy" – Wounded Drogon – Florian Friedmann, Jonathan Symmonds, Sven Skoczylas, Sebastian Lauer; Sainsbury's – Mog – Sebastian Nino, Chris Hurtt, Joseph Henson, Gez Wright
Outstanding Created Environment in an Episode, Commercial or Real-Time Project	Outstanding Effects Simulations in an Episode, Commercial or Real-Time Project
**Game of Thrones – City of Volantis** – Dominic Piche, Christine Leclerc, Patrice Poissant, Thomas Montminy-Brodeur: Black Sails – Charles Town Harbor – Aladino Debert, Matt Dougan, Greg Teegarden, Ken Jones; Game of Thrones -Drogon Arena – Rajeev B R, Loganathan Perumal, Ramesh Shankers, Anders Ericson; Vikings – Paris – Paul Wishart, Karol Wlodarczyk, Tom Morrison, Matt Ralph	**Game of Thrones – Hardhome** – David Ramos, Antonio Lado, Piotr Weiss, Felix Berges: Halo 5 – The Hunt Begins – Vladislav Tushevskiy, Tomas Zaveckas, Sho Hasegawa, Sergey Kosareff; Lipton – The Revolution in Tea – Jonathan-Wes-Westley, Tom Raynor, Christos Parliaros; SSE – Pier – Peter Agg, Sam Driscoll, Matthew Fuller
Outstanding Compositing in a Photoreal Episode	Outstanding Compositing in a Photoreal Commercial
**Game of Thrones – Hardhome** – Eduardo Diaz, Guillermo Orbe, Oscar Perea, Inmaculada Nadela: Game of Thrones – Drogon Arena – Michael Crane, Travis Nelson, Joe Salazar, Beverly Bernacki; Game of Thrones – Drogon Lair – Travis Nobles, Mark Spindler, Max Riess, Nadja Ding; Vikings – To The Gates -Ovidiu Cinazan, Olivia Yapp, Greg Lamar, Meng Angel Li	**SSE – Pier** – Gary Driver, Greg Spencer, Grant Connor: Game of War – Rooftop Alliance – Becky Porter, Jeannie Huynh, Patrick Heinen, Don Kim; Halo 5 – The Hunt Begins – Ian Holland, Brian Delmonico, Brandon Nelson, Nicholas Kim; Under Armour – Rule Yourself – Gavin Wellsman, Nathan Kane, Michael Smith, Ilia Mokhtareizadeh

=== Other categories ===
Outstanding Visual Effects in a Real-Time Project	Outstanding Visual Effects in a Special Venue Project
**The Order: 1886** – Nathan Phail-Liff, Dana Jan, Anthony Vitale, Scot Andreason: Assassin's Creed Syndicate – Thierry Dansereau, Francois Pelland, Marc-Andre Clermont, Mathieu Chouinard; Destiny: The Taken King – Michael Zak, Mark Noseworthy, Stephen Scott, Dave Matthews; Halo 5: Guardians – Nicolas Bouvier, Jon Wood, Bren Goodrich, Matt Aldride; The Hobbit: A Thief in the Shadows – Alasdair Coull, Daniel Smith, Nick Donaldson, Tim Elek	**Fast & Furious: Supercharged** – Chris Shaw, Alysia Cotter, Ben White, Diego Guerrero: Goosebumps VR Adventure – Jason Schugardt, Mike Wigart, Alex Harding, Daniel Mars; Kaka's Great Adventure – Neelesh Gore, Rajiv Kessop, Amogh Vaidya, Shaffi Mahammad; Nike; The Neymar Jr. Effect – Janelle Croshaw, Ian Markiewicz, Lou Pecora, Aruna Inversin; SpongeBob SubPants – Brent Young, John Kokum, Michael Smith, Timothy Williams
Outstanding Visual Effects in a Student Project	
**Citipati** – Andreas Feix, Francesco Faranna: Jagon – Julian Weiss, Vincent Ullmann, Fabian Frickle, Yafes Sahin; Korser – Guillaume Menard, Vincent Desgrippes, Jessie Hereng, Tangii Vaillant; Skal – Marco Hekenjos, Christian Zehetmeier, Timm Wagener, Manuel Seifert	
