= AACTA Award for Best Visual Effects or Animation =

Australian film award

- Country: Australia
- Presented by: Australian Academy of Cinema and Television Arts (AACTA)
- First award: 2006
- Currently held by: Jeff Capogreco, Alex Popescu, Jhon Alvarado, Tomasz Wachnik, Kacy McDonald, Tron: Ares (2025)
- Website: http://www.aacta.org

The AACTA Award for Best Visual Effects or Animation (previously Best Visual Effects) is an award presented by the Australian Academy of Cinema and Television Arts (AACTA) for achievements in visual effects in film, television, documentary and short film. The award was first presented by the Australian Film Institute (AFI) at the Australian Film Institute Awards (commonly known as the AFI Awards) in 2006, and continued until 2010, prior to the establishment of the Academy. In 2014 the award for Best Visual Effects was renamed Best Visual Effects or Animation. Additionally, this category is now open to any film, television or documentary production, regardless of geography, which has had 100% of its visual effects and animation created in Australia.

== Winners and nominees ==
In the following table, winners are listed first, in boldface and highlighted in gold; those listed below the winner that are not in boldface or highlighted are the nominees.

Winner of competitive award

Year	Nominee(s)	Production
**AFI Awards**
**2006** (48th)	**Rose Draper and Mike Seymour**	**Hunt Angels**
**2006** (48th)	Phil Stuart-Jones	Kokoda
**2006** (48th)	Simon Rippingale, Tim Richter and Nina Gibbs	Unfolding Florence - The Many Lives of Florence Broadhurst
**2006** (48th)	Barry Lanfranchi, James Maclachlan and Vanessa Magyar	Wicked Science
**2007** (49th)	**Andrew Hellen, Dave Morley, Jason Bath and John Cox**	**Rogue**
**2007** (49th)	David Rutherford, Reigy Skwarko, Paul Siciliano and Delon Govender	Air Australia
**2007** (49th)	Kirsty Millar and Chad Malbon	Crocodile Dreaming
**2007** (49th)	Mike Seymour	Spider
**2008** (50th)	**Barry Lanfranchi**	**H_{2}O: Just Add Water**
**2008** (50th)	James Rogers	Death Defying Acts
**2008** (50th)	Doug Bayne, Adam MacGowan, Michael Blake and Bill McGuire	Double the Fist
**2008** (50th)	Matthew Graham and Steve Anderson	Gabriel
**2009** (51st)	**Chris Godfrey, James E. Price, Andy Brown and Rob Duncan**	**Australia**
**2009** (51st)	Matt Drummond and Mike Dunn	Death of the Megabeasts
**2009** (51st)	Sandy Widyanata, Eric So, Mathew Mackereth and Christopher Jackson	Plastic
**2009** (51st)	Bertrand Polivka and Soren Jensen	Scorched
**2010** (52nd)	**Peter Spierig, Michael Spierig, Rangi Sutton, James Rogers and Randy Vellacott**	**Daybreakers**
**2010** (52nd)	Dave Morley, Felix Crawshaw, Claudia Lecaros and Tim Walker	The Tree
**2010** (52nd)	Wil Manning	Tinglewood
**2010** (52nd)	Chris Godfrey, Sigi Eimutis, Dave Morley and Tony Cole	Tomorrow, When the War Began
**2010** (52nd)	Scott Zero	Cloudstreet
**AACTA Awards**
**2011** (1st)	**Grant Freckelton**	**Legend of the Guardians: The Owls of Ga'Hoole**
**2011** (1st)	Lara Robinson	Cloudstreet
**2011** (1st)	David Booth, Peter Webb, Ineke Majoor and Glenn Melenhorst	Sanctum
**2011** (1st)	Felix Crawshaw and James Rogers	The Hunter
**2012** (2nd)	**Samuli Torssonen, Jussi Lehtiniemi, Juuso Kaari, Kelly Lee Myers**	**Iron Sky**
**2012** (2nd)	Ineke Majoor, Julian Dimsey	Killer Elite
**2012** (2nd)	James Rogers	The Sapphires
**2012** (2nd)	Kylie Robertson, Rebecca Stegh	Utopia Girls
**2013** (3rd)	**Chris Godfrey, Prue Fletcher, Tony Cole, Andy Brown**	**The Great Gatsby**
**2014** (4th)	**Chris McKay, Amber Naismith, Aidan Sarsfield and Grant Freckelton**	**The Lego Movie**
**2014** (4th)	Will Reichelt, Luke Hetherington and Emmanuel Blasset	Walking with Dinosaurs
**2014** (4th)	David Booth, Prue Fletcher, Marc Varisco and Adam Paschke	The Water Diviner
**2014** (4th)	Richard Stammers, Blondel Aidoo, Cameron Waldbauer, Tim Crosbie and Adam Paschke	X-Men: Days of Future Past
**2015** (5th)	**Andrew Jackson, Holly Radcliffe, Dan Oliver, Andy Williams, Tom Wood and Fiona Crawford**	**Mad Max: Fury Road**
**2015** (5th)	Christopher Townsend, Ryan Stafford, Paul Butterworth and Matt Estela	Avengers: Age of Ultron
**2015** (5th)	Chas Jarrett, Dan Barrow, Mark Holt, Marc Varisco and Alana Newell	Pan
**2015** (5th)	Glenn Melenhorst and Ineke Majoor	Ted 2
**2016** (6th)	**Joe Bauer, Steve Kullback, Glenn Melenhorst and Ineke Majoor**	**Game of Thrones (Season 6), episode 9: "Battle of the Bastards" (Showcase)**
**2016** (6th)	Joe Bauer, Steve Kullback, Sam Conway, Hubert Maston and Anthony Smith	Game of Thrones, episode 10: "(The Winds of Winter)"
**2016** (6th)	Eric Durst, Jack Geist, Andrew Hellen, James Whitlam and Julian Dimsey	Gods of Egypt
**2016** (6th)	John Dykstra, Matt Sloan, Blondel Aidoo, Stephen Hamilton, Tim Crosbie and Dennis Jones	X-Men: Apocalypse
**2017** (7th)	**Joe Bauer, Steve Kullback, Glenn Melenhorst, Ineke Majoor, Josh Simmonds**	**Game of Thrones (Season 7), episode 4: "The Spoils of War" (Showcase)**
**2017** (7th)	Jason Billington, James Whitlam, Linda Luong	Deepwater Horizon
**2017** (7th)	Brendan Seals, Steven Swanson, Raphael A. Pimentel, Andrew Zink	Doctor Strange
**2017** (7th)	Rob Coleman, Amber Naismith, Miles Green, Damien Gray, Craig Welsh	The Lego Batman Movie
**2018** (8th)	**Jason Bath, Brian Lynch, Matt Middleton, Simon Pickard, Will Reichelt, Peter Stubbs, Simon Whiteley**	**Peter Rabbit**
**2018** (8th)	Michael Perdew, Raphael A. Pimentel, Brendan Seals, Andrew Zink	Black Panther
**2018** (8th)	Fiona Chilton, Matt Everitt, Gregory Jowle, Kim Taylor, Simon Whiteley	The Lego Ninjago Movie
**2018** (8th)	Kate Bernauer, Aevar Bjarnason, Matt Daly, Jonathan Dearing, Angelo Sahin	Upgrade
**2019** (9th)	**Brendan Seals, Michael Perdew, Andrew Zink, Adam Gailey**	**Spider-Man: Far From Home**
**2019** (9th)	Kelvin McIlwain, Kimberly Nelson LoCascio, Josh Simmonds, David Nelson	Aquaman
**2019** (9th)	Chris Townsend, Damien Carr, Paul Butterworth, Greg Jowle	Captain Marvel
**2019** (9th)	Richard Stammers, Hal Couzens, Hayley Williams, Dennis Jones, Corinne Teng	Dumbo
**2019** (9th)	Jonathan Dearing, Chris Spry	I Am Mother
**2020** (10th)	**Tim Crosbie, Joy Wu, Jason Troughton, Tom Wood, Julian Hutchens**	**The Eight Hundred**
**2020** (10th)	Olivier Dumont, Kathy Siegel, Malte Sarnes, Mark Byers, Matt Grieg	Ford v Ferrari
**2020** (10th)	Jonathan Dearing, Marcus Bolton, Matt Ebb, Aevar Bjarnason	The Invisible Man
**2020** (10th)	Jimmy Uddo, Nicholas Brooks, Josh Simmonds, Ineke Majoor	It Chapter Two
**2020** (10th)	Thomas Elder-Groebe, Mark Breakspear, Glenn Melenhorst, Ineke Majoor	Jumanji: The Next Level
**2021** (11th)	**Matt Middleton, Simon Pickard, Simon Whiteley, Jason Bath & Will Reichelt**	**Peter Rabbit 2: The Runaway**
**2021** (11th)	Jim Berney, Jake Morrison, J.D. Schwalm, Jamie Macdougall, Marla Henshaw, Malte Sarnes	Jungle Cruise
**2021** (11th)	Chris Godfrey, Prue Fletcher, Avi Goodman, Nick Tripodi	Mortal Kombat
**2021** (11th)	Dennis Jones, Dan Bethell, Chris Godfrey, Prue Fletcher, Peter Stubbs	Mortal Kombat
**2021** (11th)	Nathan Ortiz, Damien Carr, Christopher Townsend & Josh Simmonds	Shang-Chi and the Legend of the Ten Rings
**2022** (12th)	**Tom Wood, Fiona Crawford, Julian Hutchens, Joshua Simmonds & Adam Hammond**	**Elvis**
**2022** (12th)	Sharna Hackett, Feargal Stewart, Christian So, Miles Green & Etienne Marc	DC League of Super-Pets
**2022** (12th)	Kelly Port, Julia Neighly, Brendan Seals & Kilou Picard	Spider-Man: No Way Home
**2022** (12th)	Jake Morrison, Lisa Marra, Dan Oliver, Dan Bethell & Ian Cope	Thor: Love and Thunder
**2022** (12th)	Paul Butterworth, Eric Whipp, Jason Bath, Roy Malhi, Chris Spry, Alastair Stephen & Chris Davies	Three Thousand Years of Longing
**2023** (13th)	**Andrew Whitehurst, Kathy Siegel, Alistair Williams, Julian Hutchens & Ian Cope**	**Indiana Jones and the Dial of Destiny**
**2023** (13th)	Jesse James Chisholm, Fiona Campbell Westgate, Jamie Macdougall, Rachel Copp & Paul Corbould	Ant-Man and the Wasp: Quantumania
**2023** (13th)	Kirsten Lepore, Brad Winderbaum, Raphael de Almeida Pimentel & Adam Goins	I Am Groot (Season 2)
**2023** (13th)	Sophie Byrne, Tania Vincent, Ricard Cussó & Nathan Jurevicius	Scarygirl
**2023** (13th)	Jason Hawkins, Mark Millar, Martina Joison, Flavia Riley & Matthew Chance	Wolf Like Me
**2024** (14th)	**Luke Millar, Andy Taylor, Craig Young, and Tim Walker**	**Better Man**
**2024** (14th)	Nelson Sepulveda-Fauser, Jhon Alvarado, Alé Melendez, Sebastian Ravagnani, Nicolas Caillier	Alien: Romulus
**2024** (14th)	Andrew Jackson, Jason Bath, Guido Wolter, Rachel Copp, Andy Williams	Furiosa: A Mad Max Saga
**2024** (14th)	Matt Sloan, Chris McClintock, Matt Greig, Rachel Copp, Dan Oliver	The Fall Guy
**2024** (14th)	Frazer Churchill, Fiona Chilton, Stephen King, Feargal Stewart, Alex Popescu	Transformers One
**2025** (15th)	**Jeff Capogreco, Alex Popescu, Jhon Alvarado, Tomasz Wachnik, Kacy McDonald**	**Tron: Ares**
**2025** (15th)	Glenn Melenhorst, Dom Hellier, Nathan Ortiz, Nicholas Tripodi, Teresa Mathew	How to Train Your Dragon
**2025** (15th)	Michael Ralla, James Alexander, Rachel Copp, Guido Wolter, Donnie Dean	Sinners
**2025** (15th)	David Dally, Ilona Blyth, Matt Middleton, Stephen King, Nicolas Caillier	Superman
**2025** (15th)	Genevieve Camilleri, Larry Van Duynhoven, Josh Simmonds, Jeremy Pronk, Steve Oakley	Together

== See also ==
- AACTA Awards
