= Damian Martin (make-up artist) =

Australian make-up artist

Damian Martin is an Australian make-up artist specializing in prosthetic and creature makeup. He worked with Jim Henson's Creature Shop on the TV series Farscape and has worked on such films as Star Wars: Episode II – Attack of the Clones and Star Wars: Episode III – Revenge of the Sith. In 2016, he won an Academy Award for Best Makeup and Hairstyling along with Elka Wardega and Lesley Vanderwalt at the 88th Academy Awards for his work on the movie Mad Max: Fury Road. He was also nominated for a BAFTA Award for Best Makeup and Hair in the 69th British Academy Film Awards.
