= AACTA Award for Best Direction in a Television Light Entertainment or Reality Series =

Australian television award

- Country: Australia
- Presented by: Australian Academy of Cinema and Television Arts (AACTA)
- First award: 2013
- Currently held by: Seth Larney, Hipsters (2015)
- Website: http://www.aacta.org

The AACTA Award for Best Direction in a Television Light Entertainment or Reality Series is an accolade given by the Australian Academy of Cinema and Television Arts (AACTA), a non-profit organisation whose aim is to "identify, award, promote and celebrate Australia's greatest achievements in film and television." The award is handed out at the annual AACTA Awards, which rewards achievements in feature film, television, documentaries and short films.

Previously, direction for light entertainment and reality series were recognised in the Best Direction in Television category. However, when AACTA introduced craft awards for television programs in 2013, the Best Direction in Television award was split into two: Best Direction in a Drama or Comedy and Best Direction in a Television Light Entertainment or Reality Series.

== Nominees and winners ==
Winner

Year	Director(s)	Program	Episode	Network
2013 (3rd)
2013 (3rd)	Tim Bartley and Jo Siddiqui	Hamish & Andy's Gap Year Asia	Episode 1: "Week 1"	Nine Network
2013 (3rd)	Mark Adamson	Big Brother 10	Episode 1: "Launch"	Nine Network
2013 (3rd)	Michael Venables	MasterChef Australia: The Professionals	Episode 13: "Mansfield Offsite"	Network Ten
2013 (3rd)	Ken Connor	Studio at the Memo	Episode 3: "Anna Lumb/Briefs/Don Walker/Sheridan Harbridge/Kaki King"	Studio
2014 (4th)
2014 (4th)	Beck Cole and Craig Anderson	Black Comedy	"Episode 3"	ABC
2014 (4th)	Tim Bartley	Hamish & Andy's Gap Year: South America	Episode 1: "Week 1"	Nine Network
2014 (4th)	Michael Venables	MasterChef Australia	Episode 60: "Grand Finale"	Network Ten
2014 (4th)	Peter Ots	The Voice	Episode 1: "Blind Audition #1"	Nine Network
2015 (5th)
2015 (5th)	Seth Larney	Hipsters	"Episode 1"	SBS2
2015 (5th)	Anna Bateman	Judith Lucy Is All Woman	"Episode 2"	ABC
2015 (5th)	Damian Davis	Julia Zemiro's Home Delivery	"Episode 7"	ABC
2015 (5th)	Stamatia Maroupas	Kitchen Cabinet	"Episode 7"	ABC
