= Hipsters (TV series) =

- Genre: Documentary
- Directed by: Seth Larney
- Presented by: Samuel Johnson
- Country of origin: Australia
- Original language: English

Production
- Production company: Yesterday's Gone

Original release
- Network: SBS Two

Hipsters is an Australian TV documentary series, presented by Samuel Johnson and broadcast in 2015 on Special Broadcasting Service multichannel SBS 2.

The six-part series embarks on a global quest to understand the origins, meaning and future of the cultural stereotype that has become known as the hipster. It looks at how artisan cheese, craft beer, tattoos and beards evolve from being niche trends to hipster clichés. And asks why no hipster will ever, ever admit to being one.

== Episodes ==
- Episode 1 What Is a Hipster?
- Episode 2 Fix Me a Snack
- Episode 3 Here Come the Hipsterpreneur
- Episode 4 The Future's Behind Us
- Episode 5 Tokyo Retro - Fomo
- Episode 6 The Next Big Thing

== Awards and nominations ==
Year	Award	Category	Recipients and nominees	Result
2015	5th AACTA Awards	Best Direction in a Television Light Entertainment or Reality Series	Seth Larney	Won

== See also ==
- Hipster
- Soul Mates
