= 5th AACTA International Awards =

Australian film and TV awards ceremony in 2016

- Date: 29 January 2016 (winners announced); 31 January 2016 (ceremony telecast)
- Site: Los Angeles, California

Highlights
- Best Film: Mad Max: Fury Road
- Most awards: Carol and Mad Max: Fury Road (2)
- Most nominations: Carol (5)

Television coverage
- Network: Foxtel Arts and Arena

The 5th Australian Academy of Cinema and Television Arts International Awards (commonly known as the AACTA International Awards), presented by the Australian Academy of Cinema and Television Arts (AACTA), a non-profit organisation whose aim is to identify, award, promote and celebrate Australia's greatest achievements in film and television. Awards were handed out for the best films of 2015 regardless of the country of origin, and are the international counterpart to the awards for Australian films.

The nominations were announced on 6 January 2016 with Carol (2015) leading the nominees with five. The award winners were announced on 29 January 2016 and broadcast in Australia on 31 January 2016 on Foxtel Arts and Arena.

== Winners and nominees ==
Best Film	Best Direction
Mad Max: Fury Road; The Big Short; Carol; The Revenant; Spotlight	George Miller – Mad Max: Fury Road; Adam McKay – The Big Short; Todd Haynes – Carol; Ridley Scott – The Martian; Alejandro G. Iñárritu – The Revenant
Best Actor	Best Actress
Leonardo DiCaprio – The Revenant as Hugh Glass; Steve Carell – The Big Short as Mark Baum; Matt Damon – The Martian as Mark Watney; Michael Fassbender – Steve Jobs as Steve Jobs; Eddie Redmayne – The Danish Girl as Lili Elbe	Cate Blanchett – Carol as Carol Aird; Emily Blunt – Sicario as Kate Macer; Brie Larson – Room as Joy “Ma” Newsome; Saoirse Ronan – Brooklyn as Eilis Lacey; Charlize Theron – Mad Max: Fury Road as Imperator Furiosa
Best Supporting Actor	Best Supporting Actress
Mark Rylance – Bridge of Spies as Rudolf Abel; Christian Bale – The Big Short as Michael Burry; Paul Dano – Love & Mercy as Brian Wilson; Benicio del Toro – Sicario as Alejandro Gillick; Joel Edgerton – Black Mass as John Connolly	Rooney Mara – Carol as Therese Belivet; Judy Davis – The Dressmaker as Molly Dunnage; Jennifer Jason Leigh – The Hateful Eight as Daisy Domergue; Alicia Vikander – The Danish Girl as Gerda Wegener; Kate Winslet – Steve Jobs as Joanna Hoffman
Best Screenplay
Tom McCarthy and Josh Singer – Spotlight; Alex Garland – Ex Machina; Drew Goddard – The Martian; Phyllis Nagy – Carol; Aaron Sorkin – Steve Jobs

== See also ==
- 5th AACTA Awards
- 21st Critics’ Choice Awards
- 22nd Screen Actors Guild Awards
- 69th British Academy Film Awards
- 73rd Golden Globe Awards
- 88th Academy Awards
