= June Randall =

British script supervisor (1927–2015)

June Randall (26 June 1927 – 18 January 2015) was a British script supervisor whose career spanned over five decades and more than 100 film and television productions. She was most noted for being director Stanley Kubrick's "continuity girl" on A Clockwork Orange, Barry Lyndon, and The Shining and for her work on five of the James Bond films: The Spy Who Loved Me, A View to a Kill, The Living Daylights, Licence to Kill, and GoldenEye.

== Biography ==
Randall was born on 26 June 1927 in London, England. When World War II began in 1939, Randall, then aged twelve, was sent to Australia aboard the MS Batory. She returned to England four years later. Soon thereafter, Randall sought employment at Gainsborough Pictures in the hopes of meeting actor James Mason after seeing him in an advert for his film The Wicked Lady. She did not get to meet Mason, but did manage to secure a job as secretary to the studio's Head of Production, Betty Box. Wishing to be on the studio floor, however, Randall took the lower-paying job of assistant continuity girl (now script supervisor). In this capacity, she worked on such films as Dear Murderer and Ken Annakin's Miranda.

Over the next two decades, Randall monitored continuity on such films as Hell in Korea, X: The Unknown, Quatermass 2, Tony Richardson's groundbreaking Look Back in Anger, Circus of Horrors, The Long and the Short and the Tall, Roy Ward Baker's The Anniversary, and Terence Fisher's The Devil Rides Out. She also began working in television, including 35 episodes of The Avengers and 22 episodes of The Saint. It was on the latter that Randall met actor Roger Moore, who nicknamed her "Randy" and with whom Randall remained friends for the rest of her life. Randall and Moore later worked together on two of Moore's outings as secret agent James Bond: The Spy Who Loved Me and A View to a Kill. Although the latter was Moore's last film as Bond, Randall continued with the franchise, working with Timothy Dalton on The Living Daylights and Licence to Kill and Pierce Brosnan on GoldenEye. Randall also worked with Moore on "The Wild Geese" in Africa.

Randall also had a long-standing partnership with director Stanley Kubrick, whom she met during pre-production of his film A Clockwork Orange in 1970 She agreed to work with Kubrick not only on that film, but on Barry Lyndon and The Shining, as well, despite the director's notorious compulsiveness and perfectionism. Other films on which Randall supervised continuity include the cult genre favorites Captain Kronos – Vampire Hunter and Flash Gordon, Richard Attenborough's Academy Award-winning Gandhi, Michael Mann's crime thriller Manhunter, and David Fincher's Alien³. She retired in 2001 and died in London on 18 January 2015, at the age of 87.
