= Elka Wardega =

Australian make-up artist

Elka Wardega is an Australian makeup artist specializing in prosthetic makeup. She worked on the TV series Farscape and has worked on such films as Star Wars: Episode II – Attack of the Clones, Moulin Rouge!, and the three The Chronicles of Narnia films produced by Walden Media. In 2016, she won an Academy Award for Best Makeup and Hairstyling along with Damian Martin and Lesley Vanderwalt at the 88th Academy Awards for her prosthetic work on the movie Mad Max: Fury Road.
