= Mark Mangini =

American sound editor (born 1956)

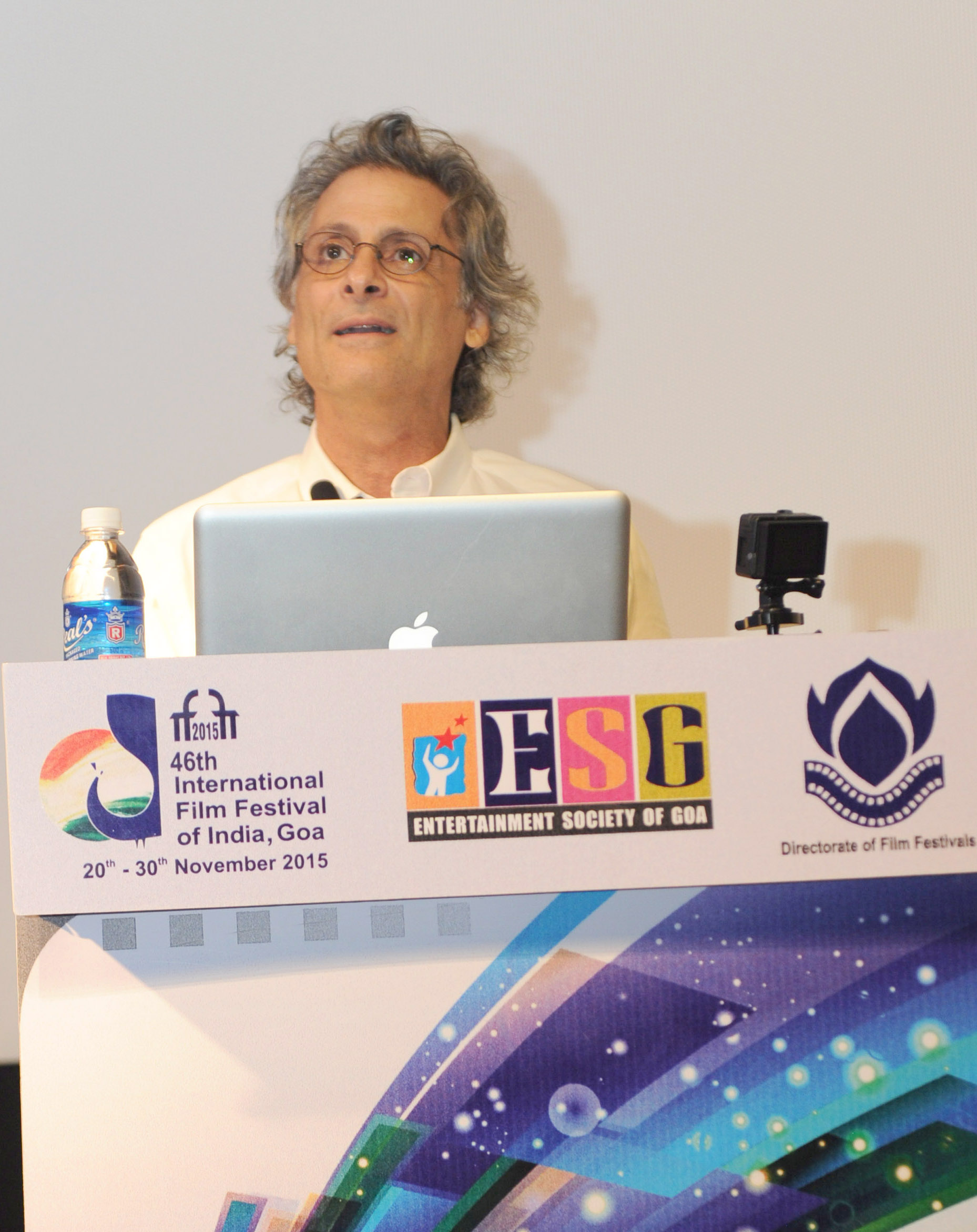
- Mangini with his Oscars and a Bafta Award
- Born: Mark Anthony Mangini; August 31, 1956 (age 69); Boston, Massachusetts, U.S.
- Occupation: Sound editor
- Years active: 1976–present
- Spouses: Annette McCarthy (m. 1984, divorced): Ann Whatu
- Children: 3, including Rio Mangini

Mark Anthony Mangini (born August 31, 1956) is an American sound editor with over 125 film credits. He has won two Academy Awards, in 2021 for Best Sound for Dune and in 2015 for Best Sound Editing along with David White for their work on Mad Max: Fury Road.

Mangini is renowned for recording and editing a new roar track for Leo the Lion, the Metro-Goldwyn-Mayer (MGM) lion mascot (ironically, tiger sounds were used for the effect).

In April 2017, Mangini partnered with Pro Sound Effects to release The Odyssey Collection, developed from his personal sound library built throughout his career with partner Richard L. Anderson.

Mangini is of Italian descent. He married actress Annette McCarthy in 1984 and they have two sons. They separated some time later. He also has a son, Rio, from his marriage to Ann Whatu.

== Oscar nominations ==
Award	Year	Category	Work	Result	Ref.
AACTA Awards	2015	Best Sound	Mad Max: Fury Road	Won	
Academy Awards	1986	Best Sound Editing	Star Trek IV: The Voyage Home	Nominated	
Academy Awards	1993	Best Sound Editing	Aladdin	Nominated	
Academy Awards	1998	Best Sound Editing	The Fifth Element	Nominated	
Academy Awards	2016	Best Sound Editing	Mad Max: Fury Road	Won	
Academy Awards	2018	Best Sound Editing	Blade Runner 2049	Nominated	
Academy Awards	2022	Best Sound	Dune	Won	
British Academy Film Awards	2016	Best Sound	Mad Max: Fury Road	Nominated	
British Academy Film Awards	2018	Best Sound	Blade Runner 2049	Nominated	
British Academy Film Awards	2022	Best Sound	Dune	Won	
Golden Reel Awards	1993	Best Sound Editing – Animated Feature	Aladdin	Won	
Golden Reel Awards	1998	Best Sound Editing	The Fifth Element	Nominated	
Golden Reel Awards	2018	Outstanding Achievement in Sound Editing – Dialogue / ADR	Blade Runner 2049	Nominated	
Golden Reel Awards	2018	Outstanding Achievement in Sound Editing – Effects / Foley	Blade Runner 2049	Won	
Golden Reel Awards	2022	Outstanding Achievement in Sound Editing – Sound Effects and Foley for Feature Film	Dune	Won	
Hollywood Professional Association Awards	2018	Outstanding Sound – Feature Film	Blade Runner 2049	Nominated	
Hollywood Professional Association Awards	2022	Outstanding Sound – Feature Film	Dune	Won	
Hollywood Professional Association Awards	2023	Outstanding Sound - Documentary/Nonfiction	Good Night Oppy	Nominated	
Hollywood Professional Association Awards	2023	Outstanding Sound - Documentary/Nonfiction	32 Sound	Nominated	
Motion Picture Sound Editors	2016	Feature Film – Sound Effects & Foley	Blade Runner 2049	Won (Note: Tied with The Revenant (2015))	
Motion Picture Sound Editors	2016	Feature Film – Dialogue & ADR	Blade Runner 2049	Nominated	
Satellite Awards	2016	Best Sound	Blade Runner 2049	Nominated	
Satellite Awards	2021	Best Sound	Dune	Nominated	
