= Lisa Thompson (set decorator) =

Australian production designer

- Occupation: Set decorator
- Years active: 1988-present

Lisa Thompson is an Australian set decorator and Academy Award winner.

Thompson is from Toorak, Victoria and got her break in the industry working on Romper Stomper in 1992. She also worked on Moulin Rouge!

In 2015, Thompson won an Emmy Award for the miniseries The Pacific, in the category of Outstanding Art Direction for a Miniseries or Movie.

Thompson won the Academy Award for Best Production Design at the 88th Academy Awards in 2015 for her work on the film Mad Max: Fury Road along with Colin Gibson.
