= Ben Osmo =

Australian Production Sound Mixer

- Occupation: Production Sound Mixer
- Years active: 1974–present

Ben Osmo is an Australian Production Sound Mixer. He is recipient of an Academy Award, three AACTA Awards and an honorary Australian Centenary Medal 2001. He is best known for his works Dead Calm (1989), Strictly Ballroom (1991) and Mad Max: Fury Road, which earned him the Academy Award for Best Sound Mixing at the 88th Academy Awards alongside Chris Jenkins and Gregg Rudloff.

== Filmography ==
- 2015: Women He's Undressed (documentary)
- 2015: Mad Max: Fury Road
- 2014: Devil's Playground
- 2012: The Sapphires
- 2011: Shelling Peas (Short)
- 2011: Sleeping Beauty
- 2009: The Boys Are Back
- 2008: Newcastle
- 2008: The Black Balloon
- 2006: Monarch Cove
- 2006: Charlotte's Web
- 2003: Fuel (Short)
- 2003: Peter Pan
- 2003: Danny Deckchair
- 2002: The Nugget
- 2002: Rabbit-Proof Fence
- 2001: The Man Who Sued God
- 2001: He Died with a Felafel in His Hand
- 2001: Crocodile Dundee in Los Angeles
- 2000: The Monkey's Mask
- 1999: Holy Smoke!
- 1998: Babe: Pig in the City
- 1997: Oscar and Lucinda
- 1997: Robinson Crusoe
- 1996: The Phantom
- 1995: Babe
- 1995: Operation Dumbo Drop
- 1994: Country Life
- 1993: The Custodian
- 1992: Lorenzo's Oil
- 1992: The Last Days of Chez Nous
- 1992: Strictly Ballroom
- 1992: Turtle Beach
- 1990: Prisoners of the Sun
- 1989: Bangkok Hilton (3 episodes)
- 1989: Dead Calm
- 1988: Emerald City
- 1988: The Clean Machine
- 1987: HighTide
- 1987: Peter Kenna's The Good Wife
- 1984: Crime of the Decade
- 1984: Kindred Spirits
- 1983: Scales of Justice
- 1976: No Fences, No Boundaries: Walter Burley Griffin
- 1975: Double Dealer

== Awards and nominations ==
- 2001: Australian Centenary Medal 2001 – Honorary (2001)
- 1989: AACTA Award for Best Sound – Dead Calm (won)
- 1991: AACTA Award for Best Sound – Strictly Ballroom (nom)
- 2007: The Zig Zag Lane IF Award for Best Sound – The Black Balloon (nom)
- 2015: AACTA Award for Best Sound – Mad Max: Fury Road (won)
- 2015: BAFTA Award for Best Sound – Mad Max: Fury Road (nom)
- 2015: Satellite Award for Best Sound – Mad Max: Fury Road (nom)
- 2016: Academy Award for Best Sound – Mad Max: Fury Road (Won)
