= Chris Jenkins (sound engineer) =

American sound engineer

- Occupation: Sound engineer
- Years active: 1979–present

Chris Jenkins is an American sound engineer. He has won three Academy Awards for Best Sound and was nominated for two others in the same category. He has worked on more than 150 films since 1979.

== Selected filmography ==
Jenkins has won three Academy Awards for Best Sound and was nominated for another two:

Won

- Out of Africa (1985)
- The Last of the Mohicans (1992)
- Mad Max: Fury Road (2015) (with Ben Osmo and Gregg Rudloff)

Nominated

- Dick Tracy (1990)
- Wanted (2008)
