= Lesley Vanderwalt =

New Zealand hair and makeup artist

- Occupations: hair designer & makeup artist
- Years active: 1976 - Present
- Notable work: Mad Max: Fury Road, Moulin Rouge! & Dark City
- Awards: Academy Award for Best Makeup and Hairstyling; Mad Max: Fury Road (2016)

Lesley Vanderwalt is a New Zealand cinematic hair designer and makeup artist. Vanderwalt was raised and began her career in New Zealand before moving to Australia. She has frequently collaborated with directors such as George Miller and Baz Luhrmann.

== Career ==
Vanderwalt has worked as a hair or makeup supervisor on TV shows and films including Mad Max 2: The Road Warrior, Farscape, Moulin Rouge!, Star Wars: Episode II – Attack of the Clones, and The Great Gatsby.

In 2016, she won the Academy Award for Best Makeup and Hairstyling at the 88th Academy Awards and a BAFTA Award for Best Makeup and Hair in the 69th British Academy Film Awards for her work overseeing hair and makeup on the movie Mad Max: Fury Road.
