= David White (sound editor) =

Australian sound editor

- Occupation: Sound editor
- Years active: 2004-present
- Notable work: Mad Max: Fury Road

David White is an Australian sound editor best known for his role as the sound designer of the 2015 film Mad Max: Fury Road. White won the Academy Award for Best Sound Editing for the 2015 film Mad Max: Fury Road with fellow sound editor Mark Mangini.

== Filmography ==
- Snow Monkey (2015) ... Sound mixer
- Mad Max: Fury Road (2015) ... Sound designer
- Inside Out (2013) (Short) ... Sound mixer
- Love City, Jalalabad (2013) ... Sound editor
- The Road Home (2013) (Short) ... Sound editor
- Happy Feet Two (2011) ... Sound design
- Wild Planet (Redux) (2010) ... Sound editor / sound mixer
- Orchids, My Intersex Adventure (2010) ... Sound mixer
- Policing the Pacific (2007) ... Sound mixer
- Farscape: The Peacekeeper Wars (2004) (TV Mini-Series) ... Supervising sound editor
- Farscape (1999-2001) (TV Series)... Supervising sound editor

== Awards and recognitions ==
Year	Award	Category	Type	Title
2016	Academy Award	Best Sound Editing	Won	Mad Max: Fury Road
2016	British Academy Film Awards	Best Sound	Nominated	Mad Max: Fury Road
2016	AACTA Awards	Best Sound	Won	Mad Max: Fury Road
2016	Australian Screen Sound Guild	Best Film Sound Design	Nominated	Mad Max: Fury Road
2016	Seattle Film Critics Awards	Best Sound Design	Nominated	Mad Max: Fury Road
2013	AACTA Award	Best Sound in a Documentary	Nominated	Once Upon a Time in Cabramatta
2012	Australian Screen Sound Guild	Best Achievement in Film Sound Design	Nominated	Happy Feet Two
2009	AFI Awards	Best Sound in a Documentary	Nominated	The Choir
2008	Australian Screen Sound Guild	Best Achievement in Sound for a Tele-Feature	Nominated	Scorched
2007	Australian Screen Sound Guild	Best Achievement in Sound for Film Sound Design	Nominated	Clubland
2002	ASSG Award	Best Achievement in Sound for a Drama Series	Won	Farscape
2000	Golden Reel Award	Best Sound Editing	Nominated	Farscape
2000	Australian Screen Sound Guild	Best Achievement in Sound for a Drama Series	Won	Farscape
