= Tom Wood (visual effects) =

- Occupation: Visual effects supervisor
- Years active: 1999–present

Tom Wood is an English visual effects supervisor.

Wood worked at Cinesite in London, where he worked on various feature films, including Event Horizon (1997) and Lost in Space (1998). He then worked at MPC on films including Harry Potter and the Chamber of Secrets (2002), Kingdom of Heaven (2005) and Sunshine (2007). He worked independently on Prince of Persia: The Sands of Time (2010).

Wood moved to Australia in 2012 to head up the VFX work on Mad Max: Fury Road with Iloura. He is nominated at the 88th Academy Awards for this work in the category for Best Visual Effects. His nomination is shared with Andy Williams, Dan Oliver, and Andrew Jackson.

== Awards ==
- 2015: Academy Award for Best Visual Effects – Mad Max: Fury Road
- 2015: BAFTA Award for Best Special Visual Effects – Mad Max: Fury Road
- 2015: AACTA Award for Best Visual Effects – Mad Max: Fury Road
- 2010: Visual Effects Society Award for Outstanding Visual Effects in a Photoreal Feature – Knowing
