= Andrew Jackson (visual effects) =

English-Australian visual effects supervisor

- Occupation: Visual effects supervisor
- Years active: 1999–present

Andrew Jackson is an English Australian visual effects supervisor, working at DNEG. He has worked on various feature films, including 300 (2006), Knowing (2009), Mad Max: Fury Road (2015), Dunkirk (2017), The King (2019), Tenet (2020), and Oppenheimer (2023).

Jackson was nominated at the 88th Academy Awards for his work on the film Mad Max: Fury Road in the category of Best Visual Effects. His nomination was shared with Andy Williams, Dan Oliver, and Tom Wood.

He won at the 93rd Academy Awards for his work on the film Tenet in the category of Best Visual Effects. His nomination was shared with David Lee, Andrew Lockley and Scott Fisher.

== Early life ==
Jackson grew up on a secluded farm in Australia. During his childhood, he built models and model aircraft. He started out in practical effects before moving into visual effects.

== Awards ==
- 2021: Won Academy Award for Best Visual Effects – Tenet
- 2021: Won BAFTA Award for Best Special Visual Effects – Tenet
- 2021: Nominated Visual Effects Society Award – Tenet
- 2018: Won Visual Effects Society Award for Outstanding Supporting Visual Effects in a Photoreal Feature – Dunkirk
- 2017: Nominated BAFTA Award for Best Special Visual Effects – Dunkirk
- 2015: Nominated Academy Award for Best Visual Effects – Mad Max: Fury Road
- 2015: Nominated BAFTA Award for Best Special Visual Effects – Mad Max: Fury Road
- 2015: Won AACTA Award for Best Visual Effects – Mad Max: Fury Road
- 2010: Nominated Visual Effects Society Award for Best Single Visual Effect of the Year – Knowing
