= Colin Gibson (production designer) =

Australian production designer

Colin Gibson is an Australian production designer. He is known for his collaborations with George Miller, including on Mad Max: Fury Road which resulted in winning the Academy Award for Best Production Design and an AACTA Award. Gibson's other work includes The Adventures of Priscilla, Queen of the Desert, for which he shared a BAFTA award nomination with Owen Paterson.

== Career ==
Colin Gibson collaborated with George Miller on films, including Babe, Babe 2: Pig in the City, Happy Feet, Happy Feet Two, and Mad Max: Fury Road. He also worked on The Adventures of Priscilla, Queen of the Desert with Owen Paterson.

Gibson designed the bus for the film The Adventures of Priscilla, Queen of the Desert and all the vehicles in Mad Max: Fury Road. He joined the production of the latter film in 2000, and first began building cars in 2003. The film soon entered development hell and did not resume production until 2011. Director George Miller insisted that all the vehicles and props be fully functional, including a flame-throwing guitar that was played live.

== Awards ==
| Year | Award | Result | Title | Ref |
|---|---|---|---|---|
| 1995 | BAFTA Award for Best Production Design | Nominated | The Adventures of Priscilla, Queen of the Desert | |
| 2015 | Hollywood Production Design Award | Won | Mad Max: Fury Road | |
| 2015 | AACTA Award for Best Production Design | Won | Mad Max: Fury Road | |
| 2015 | Critics' Choice Movie Award for Best Production Design | Won | Mad Max: Fury Road | |
| 2016 | Academy Award for Best Production Design | Won | Mad Max: Fury Road | |
| 2020 | AACTA Award for Best Production Design in Television | Nominated | Operation Buffalo | |
