= Gregg Rudloff =

American re-recording mixer (1955–2019)

- Born: November 2, 1955; Los Angeles, California
- Died: January 6, 2019 (aged 63); Los Angeles, California
- Occupation: Re-recording mixer
- Years active: 1983–2019

Gregg Rudloff (November 2, 1955 – January 6, 2019) was an American re-recording mixer. He won three Academy Awards for Best Sound and was nominated for four more in the same category. He worked on 150 films from 1983 onwards. His father, Tex Rudloff, was a sound engineer who was nominated for an Academy Award in 1978. On January 6, 2019, Rudloff died aged 63 from a reported suicide.

== Selected filmography ==
Rudloff won three Academy Awards for Best Sound and was nominated for four more:

Won

- Glory (1989)
- The Matrix (1999)
- Mad Max: Fury Road (2015)

Nominated

- The Perfect Storm (2000)
- Flags of Our Fathers (2006)
- Argo (2012)
- American Sniper (2014)
