= Andy Williams (visual effects) =

- Occupation: Visual effects supervisor
- Years active: 1985–present

Andy Williams is a visual effects supervisor.

Andy Williams was nominated at the 88th Academy Awards for his work on the film Mad Max: Fury Road in the category of Best Visual Effects. His nomination was shared with Dan Oliver, Andrew Jackson, and Tom Wood.
