= Dan Oliver =

Australian special effects supervisor

- Occupation: Visual effects supervisor
- Years active: 1994–present
- Website: http://www.danosfx.com/

Dan Oliver is an Australian special effects supervisor. He worked on various feature films, including X-Men Origins: Wolverine (2009), The Great Gatsby (2013), Mad Max: Fury Road (2015) and Gods of Egypt (2016)

Dan Oliver was nominated at the 88th Academy Awards for his work on the film Mad Max: Fury Road in the category of Best Visual Effects. His nomination was shared with Andrew Jackson, Andy Williams and Tom Wood. He was also nominated at the 94th Academy Awards for his work on the film Shang-Chi and the Legend of the Ten Rings. His nomination was shared with Christopher Townsend, Joe Farrell and Sean Noel Walker.
