= Matthew Needham =

British actor (born 1984)

- Needham in 2026
- Born: 13 April 1984 (age 42); Kingston upon Thames, England
- Education: London Academy of Music and Dramatic Art (BA)
- Occupation: Actor
- Years active: 2007–present

Matthew Needham (born 13 April 1984) is a British actor. He has worked on stage and screen, appearing in television series such as Casualty, Endeavour, and Sanditon. As of 2022, Needham portrays Larys Strong on the HBO fantasy series House of the Dragon. His performance in the series has received critical acclaim.

== Early life ==
He graduated with a Bachelor of Arts in Acting from the London Academy of Music and Dramatic Art in 2007.

== Career ==
Needham made his professional in acting debut in September 2007 when he joined the cast of BBC medical drama Casualty as junior doctor Toby De Silva. He left the role in January 2009. In 2010 he appeared in the BBC series Sherlock. In 2011, he appeared in the ITV medical drama, Monroe.

Needham has performed on stage for the Royal Shakespeare Company, Royal Court Theatre, Royal National Theatre, Almeida Theatre, and Shakespeare's Globe. In his performance for the play Britannicus, he was nominated for the 2011 Ian Charleson Award.

In 2015, Needham starred in the short film Stutterer, written and directed by Benjamin Cleary and produced by Serena Armitage and Shan Christopher Ogilvie. The film won Best Live Action Short Film at the 88th Academy Awards.

In January 2017, he appeared in episode 2 of series 4 of the ITV drama series Endeavour. In March 2017, he played Stanley Kowalski in the BBC Radio 3 production of A Streetcar Named Desire by Tennessee Williams.

In 2019, Needham played Mr. Crowe in the first series of the ITV period drama Sanditon. As of 2022, he plays Larys Strong on the HBO fantasy series House of the Dragon. In 2023, he appeared as Lucien Bonaparte alongside Joaquin Phoenix in the film Napoleon. He voiced the Joker in the second season of Batman: Caped Crusader.

== Filmography ==
=== Film ===
Year	Title	Role	Notes
2015	Shakespeare's Globe: Titus Andronicus	Saturninus	Filmed version of the stage show at The Globe
2015	Shakespeare's Globe: The Comedy of Errors	Antipholus of Ephesus	Filmed version of the stage show at The Globe
2015	Stutterer	Greenwood Carsen	Won Best Live Action Short Film at the 88th Academy Awards
2017	The Ritual	Junkie	
2017	From A Strange Land	Jonas	Short
2023	Napoleon	Lucien Bonaparte	
2024	The Generators	Oscar	
TBA	Painter	TBA	Post-production

=== Television ===
Year	Title	Role	Notes
2007–2009	Casualty	Toby De Silva	Main Role, 61 Episodes
2010	Sherlock	Bezza	1 Episode
2011	Monroe	David Foster	1 Episode
2016	The Hollow Crown	Basset	2 Episodes
2017	Endeavour	Dudley Jessop	1 Episode
2018	Doctors	Kieran Barnes	1 Episode
2019	Chernobyl	Dmitri	1 Episode
2019	Sanditon	Mr Crowe	7 Episodes
2021	Doctor Who	Old Swarm	2 Episodes
2022–present	House of the Dragon	Larys Strong	Main role; 19 episodes
2023	Great Expectations	Mr Drummle	TV Miniseries; 4 Episodes
2026	Batman: Caped Crusader	The Joker	Voice; 4 episodes
2026	Blade Runner 2099 †	TBA	Post-production

=== Stage ===
Year	Title	Role	Notes
2009	Shades	Mark	Royal Court Theatre
2009	The Grapes of Wrath	Noah	Chichester Festival Theatre
2011	Britannicus	Nero	Natural Perspective Theatre Company
2013	Titus Andronicus	Lucius	Royal Shakespeare Company
2013	Candide	Candide	Royal Shakespeare Company
2015	Titus Andronicus	Saturninus	The Globe
2015	The Jew of Malta	Pilia Borza	Royal Shakespeare Company
2017	The Twilight Zone	Perry/Stockton/Harrington	Almeida Theatre
2018	Summer and Smoke	John Buchannan	Almeida Theatre
2019	Fairview	Jimbo	Young Vic Theatre
