= Eric Richard =

English actor (born 1940)

- Born: 27 June 1940 (age 86); Margate, Kent, England
- Spouse(s): Unknown (? – ?) (divorced); Tina Kettle (? – present)
- Children: 4

Eric Richard (born Eric Smith, 27 June 1940) is an English actor and presenter.

His theatre work includes plays at the Royal Court Theatre and the Theatre Royal, Stratford East, as well as seasons with the Royal Exchange, Manchester, Birmingham Repertory Theatre, Sheffield Crucible Theatre and Paines Plough. In 2001, he appeared as Ebeneezer Scrooge in a production of Charles Dickens' A Christmas Carol at the UCL Bloomsbury Theatre, London.

He is best known for his role as Sergeant Bob Cryer in the long-running ITV drama The Bill, who he portrayed for twenty years from the show's inception in 1984. His television work has also included Shōgun, Victoria Wood As Seen on TV, Play for Today, Juliet Bravo, Made in Britain, Open All Hours, Games Without Frontiers, P'tang, Yang, Kipperbang, Shoestring, Casualty and Holby City. He made a brief appearance in Open All Hours as a cash register salesman at Arkwright's shop, in the final series in 1985. In 1991, he reviewed motorcycles for Top Gear. He also played the Astronomer’s Technician in the 1978 horror movie, The Final Conflict.

In 2010, it was announced that Richard was to appear in the stage version of Lark Rise to Candleford, which was on a nationwide tour at the time.

His two-month-old grandson, Charlie Smith, was the youngest known British victim of the 2004 Indian Ocean earthquake and tsunami. He died in the arms of his father, Richard, after the wave hit them in Sri Lanka. They had sat down to eat when the water swept up into the restaurant.

In 2016, he starred in the short film Stutterer, which won the Academy Award for Best Live Action Short Film at the 88th Academy Awards. It was written and directed by Benjamin Cleary, and produced by Serena Armitage and Shan Christopher Ogilvie. He also starred in Ben Rider's indie drama Forever Tomorrow.

He appears in the 2017 war film Dunkirk, credited as "Man at Railway Window".

In 2018, Richard appeared as Maurice in EastEnders.

In 2025, he made a brief appearance in Call the Midwife (series 14, episode 6).
