= London Film Critics Circle Awards 2015 =

British film awards ceremony

35th London Film Critics Circle Awards

17 January 2016

Film of the Year:
Mad Max: Fury Road

British Film of the Year:
45 Years

The 36th London Film Critics' Circle Awards, honouring the best in film for 2015, were announced by the London Film Critics' Circle on 17 January 2016.

== Winners and nominees ==
=== Film of the Year ===
Mad Max: Fury Road

- 45 Years
- Amy
- Carol
- Inside Out
- The Look of Silence
- The Martian
- The Revenant
- Room
- Spotlight

=== Foreign Language Film of the Year ===
The Look of Silence

- Eden
- Hard to Be a God
- The Tale of the Princess Kaguya
- The Tribe

=== British/Irish Film of the Year ===
45 Years

- Amy
- Brooklyn
- The Lobster
- London Road

=== Documentary of the Year ===
Amy

- Going Clear: Scientology and the Prison of Belief
- The Look of Silence
- Palio
- A Syrian Love Story

=== Actor of the Year ===
Tom Courtenay – 45 Years

- Paul Dano – Love & Mercy
- Leonardo DiCaprio – The Revenant
- Michael Fassbender – Steve Jobs
- Tom Hardy – Legend

=== Actress of the Year ===
Charlotte Rampling – 45 Years

- Cate Blanchett – Carol
- Brie Larson – Room
- Rooney Mara – Carol
- Saoirse Ronan – Brooklyn

=== Supporting Actor of the Year ===
Mark Rylance – Bridge of Spies

- Benicio del Toro – Sicario
- Tom Hardy – The Revenant
- Oscar Isaac – Ex Machina
- Michael Keaton – Spotlight

=== Supporting Actress of the Year ===
Kate Winslet – Steve Jobs

- Olivia Colman – The Lobster
- Kristen Stewart – Clouds of Sils Maria
- Tilda Swinton – Trainwreck
- Alicia Vikander – Ex Machina

=== British/Irish Actor of the Year ===
Tom Hardy – Legend, London Road, Mad Max: Fury Road, and The Revenant

- Michael Caine – Kingsman: The Secret Service and Youth
- Idris Elba – Beasts of No Nation and Second Coming
- Colin Farrell – The Lobster and Miss Julie
- Michael Fassbender – Macbeth, Slow West, and Steve Jobs

=== British/Irish Actress of the Year ===
Saoirse Ronan – Brooklyn and Lost River

- Emily Blunt – Sicario
- Carey Mulligan – Far From the Madding Crowd and Suffragette
- Charlotte Rampling – 45 Years and The Forbidden Room
- Kate Winslet – The Dressmaker, A Little Chaos, and Steve Jobs

=== Young British/Irish Performer of the Year ===
Maisie Williams – The Falling

- Asa Butterfield – X+Y
- Milo Parker – Mr. Holmes and Robot Overlords
- Florence Pugh – The Falling
- Liam Walpole – The Goob

=== Director of the Year ===
George Miller – Mad Max: Fury Road

- Andrew Haigh – 45 Years
- Todd Haynes – Carol
- Alejandro G. Iñárritu – The Revenant
- Ridley Scott – The Martian

=== Screenwriter of the Year ===
Tom McCarthy and Josh Singer – Spotlight

- Emma Donoghue – Room
- Nick Hornby – Brooklyn
- Phyllis Nagy – Carol
- Aaron Sorkin – Steve Jobs

=== Breakthrough British/Irish Filmmaker ===
John Maclean – Slow West

- Tom Browne – Radiator
- Mark Burton and Richard Starzak – Shaun the Sheep Movie
- Emma Donoghue – Room
- Alex Garland – Ex Machina

=== British/Irish Short Film ===
Benjamin Cleary – Stutterer

- Fyzal Boulifa – Rate Me
- Jorn Threlfall – Over
- Simon Mesa Soto – Leidi
- Duncan Cowles – Directed by Tweedie

=== Technical Achievement ===
Carol – Edward Lachman, cinematography

- Carol – Carter Burwell, music
- Cinderella – Sandy Powell, costumes
- Ex Machina – Andrew Whitehurst, visual effects
- Macbeth – Alistair Sirkett and Markus Stemler, sound design
- Mad Max: Fury Road – Colin Gibson, production design
- Mad Max: Fury Road – John Seale, cinematography
- Mission: Impossible – Rogue Nation – Wade Eastwood, stunts
- Sicario – Tom Ozanich, sound design
- Steve Jobs – Elliot Graham, editing

=== Dilys Powell Award ===
- Kenneth Branagh
