= Adam Benzine =

British filmmaker and journalist

Adam Benzine is a British filmmaker and journalist. He is known for his HBO documentary Claude Lanzmann: Spectres of the Shoah, which examined the life and work of French director Claude Lanzmann. The film received critical appraisal and widespread acclaim including an Oscar nomination in the Best Documentary (Short Subject) category at the 88th Academy Awards, and nominations from the Grierson Awards, the Canadian Screen Awards, the IDA Documentary Awards, the Banff Rockie Awards and the Cinema Eye Honors. The documentary took four years to complete. Benzine's interview with Lanzmann was Lanzmann's first since 1985, the year Shoah was finished.

Benzine currently serves as the Canadian bureau chief for British news publisher C21 Media, before which he served as associate editor for Canadian non-fiction news publisher Realscreen. Prior to his career in film, he studied BSc Multimedia Technology & Design at Brunel University London and MA Magazine Journalism at City University London before working as Online Editor for British weekly trade newspaper Music Week.

An Op-ed Benzine published in the National Post, in September 2019, compared the Toronto International Film Festival (TIFF) with the Venice Film Festival. Benzine quoted Kiva Reardon, at TIFF, who disputed Venice's festival's director, Alberta Barbera's claim that the reason he hadn't scheduled more films from female directors was that they just weren't making enough good films.

In 2020, he made the documentary The Curve, which is about America's response to the COVID-19 pandemic. The film was released on the internet a week before the 2020 United States presidential election.
