= JusticeForFlint =

Charity event

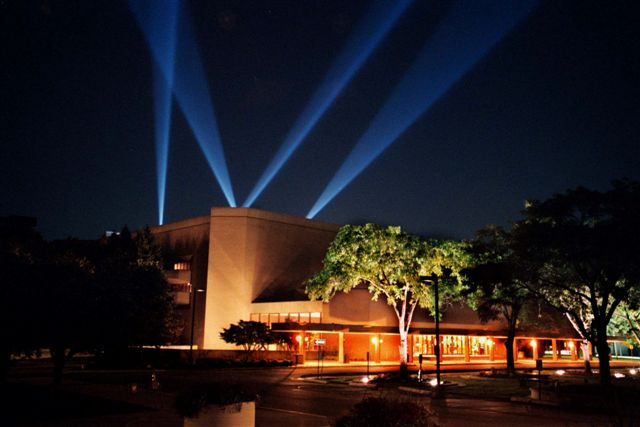
Whiting Auditorium in Flint, Michigan

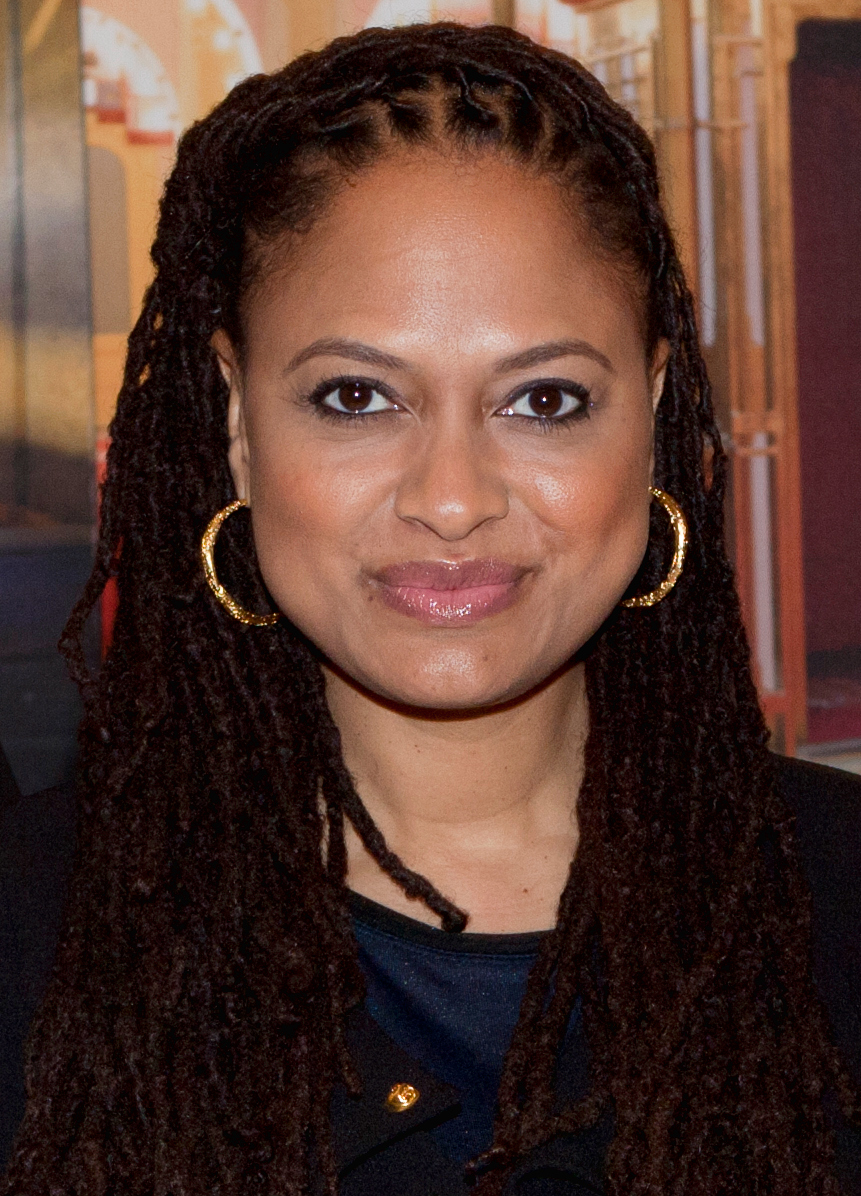
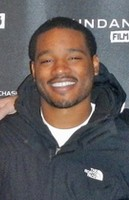
Initiators
Ava DuVernay and Ryan Coogler

#JusticeForFlint was a charity event held on February 28, 2016, addressing the ongoing Flint water crisis in the U.S. state of Michigan. With the victims of the lead poisoning being predominantly black, the political scandal has been regarded as an example of racial inequalities in the U.S., and the charity event has been associated with the Black Lives Matter campaign.

Initiated by Creed director Ryan Coogler and Selma director Ava DuVernay, the free public event was held at the Whiting Auditorium in Flint, Michigan. Hosted by comedian Hannibal Buress, it featured singers Janelle Monáe and Ledisi, as well as actor-activists Jesse Williams and Jussie Smollett, amongst others. Surprising star guest was "King of Motown" Stevie Wonder, who teamed up with Monáe for "Hell You Talkin' Bout", a protest song she had written for the people of Flint.

Coinciding with the 88th Academy Awards ceremony, the event drew considerable attention after the Academy faced unprecedented criticism and controversy in early 2016 for its lack of diversity in this year's nomination. The event was further propagated on social media using the #JusticeForFlint hashtag, and live-streamed by Sean Combs' Revolt.tv network.

So far, the fund has raised $156,000.

== Background ==
=== Oscars so white controversy ===
After no black actors nor filmmaker was nominated in any of the major acting or directing categories and with Hispanic filmmakers again only being represented by Alejandro González Iñárritu, the awards were criticized by celebrities including George Clooney and U.S. President Barack Obama, who asked "Are we making sure that everybody is getting a fair shot?" Coogler's widely praised film Creed earned just a single nomination for Sylvester Stallone in the Best Supporting Actor category, while it was the great winner at the recent Black Reel Awards, where it earned a total of five awards, including Best Film, Best Director (for Coogler), and Best Actor (for Michael B. Jordan).

A number of celebrities including Will Smith, Best Original Song nominee Antony Hegarty, Jussie Smollett, and Spike Lee declared they would boycott this year's Academy Awards ceremony, some of them attending Ryan Coogler's charity event Justice for Flint instead. Coogler however supported the nominated Sylvester Stallone to stand up for the film, attending the Academy Awards ceremony.

The event's organizers insisted on the timing being a mere coincidence, with Coogler explaining the date was chosen because it falls on the last weekend of this year's Black History Month. Nevertheless, the event has been regarded as an alternative for those disappointed with this year's Oscars. In an interview with Katie Couric, co-initiator DuVernay said: "I guess I can see how people are making the connection, but we didn’t have anything to do that night. We were free. We are basically saying on this night, there are other things going on around issues of justice and dignity."

=== The Flint Water Crisis, a "racial crime" ===
Referring to the Flint water crisis as "a trauma that has been going on there for several years," co-initiator Ava DuVernay said they wanted to "shed a light and amplify the voices on the ground there in Flint." Inviting the people of Flint to "a night of empowerment and enlightenment and community-building and togetherness," she asked people watching the concert on the Revolt.tv livestream to donate to the people of Flint. In explicit agreement with her director colleague Michael Moore, raised in Flint, who called the crisis a "racial crime," DuVernay said: “I think it's environmental racism, absolutely. We wouldn’t have seen this problem if this was in a community with more voice.”

The lead poisoning scandal, dubbed by critics a "contamination of a U.S. city by its own government", result of a cost-cutting measure by Michigan governor Rick Snyder's administration, only leaked out when separate studies by Hurley Medical Center pediatrician Mona Hanna-Attisha and Virginia Tech Professor Marc Edwards publicly challenged the state’s botched findings. Since her election in November 2015, Flint's new mayor Karen Weaver helped bringing the scandal to a national spotlight

== The event ==
Organized by activist collective Blackout for Human Rights, the event was co-sponsored by the PICO National Network's Live Free Campaign, Michigan Faith in Action, the Campaign for Black Male Achievement, and the Flint Democracy Defense League.

Lineup at the Justice for Flint charity event
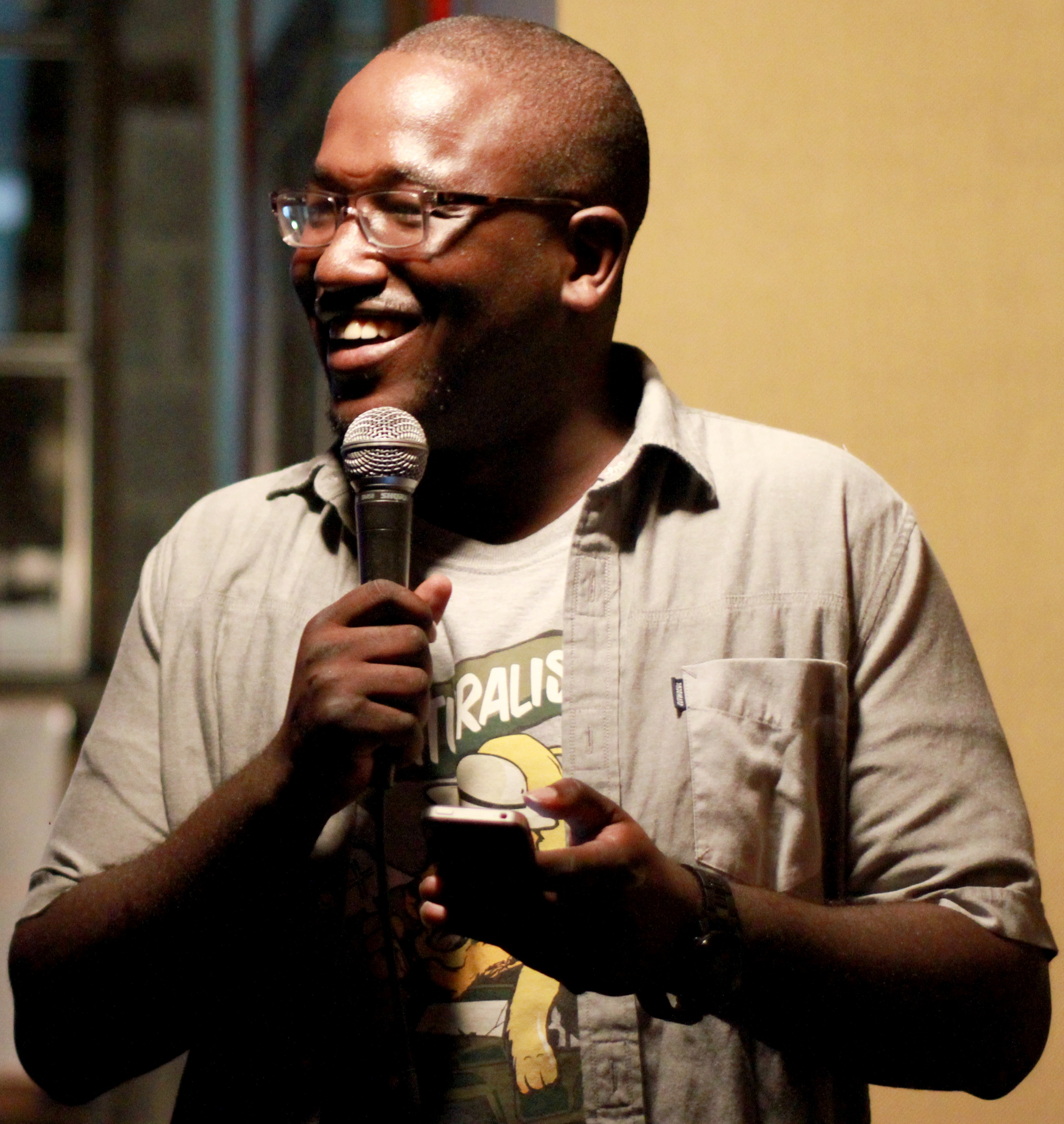
Host
Hannibal Buress

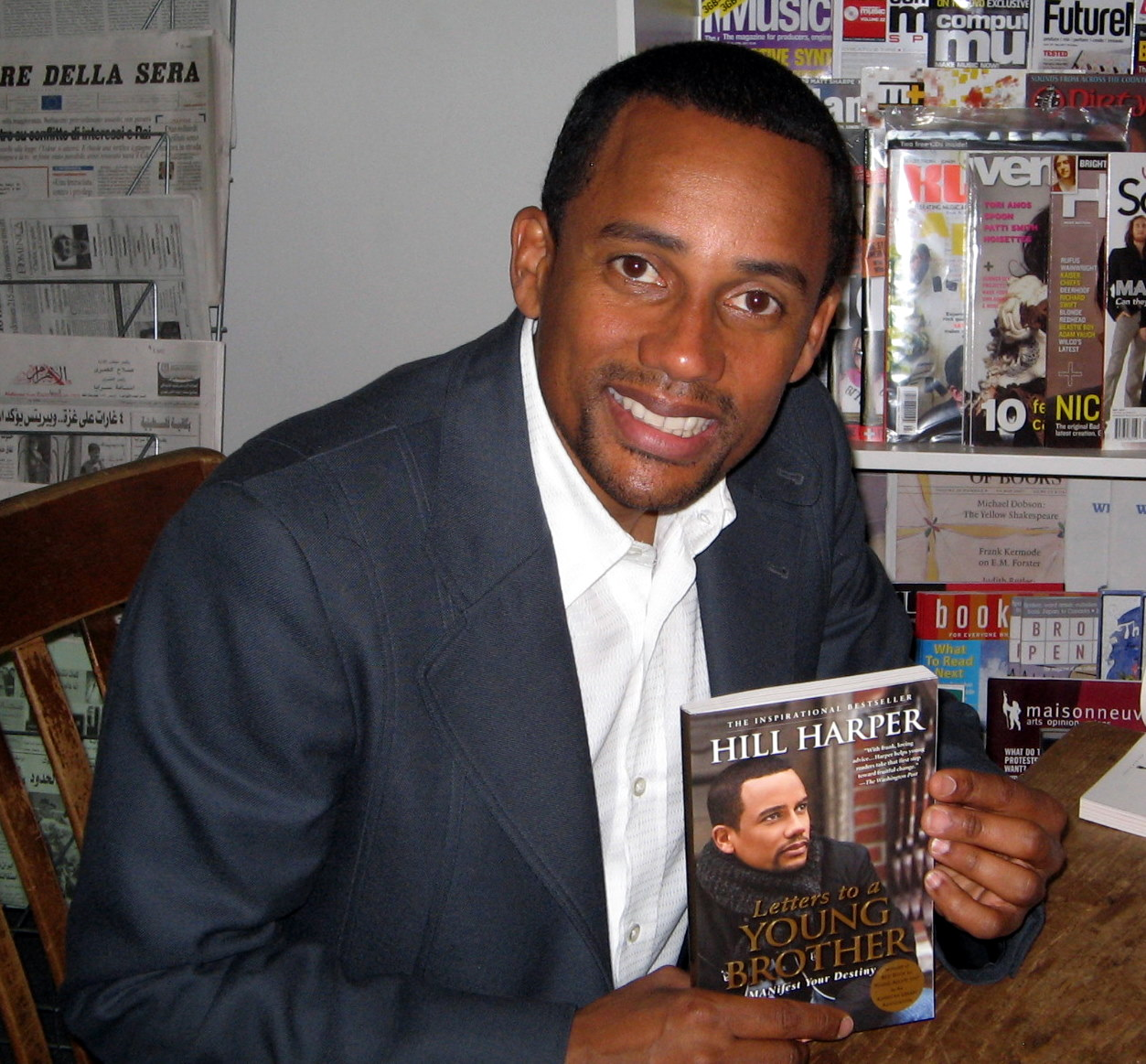
Actor
Hill Harper

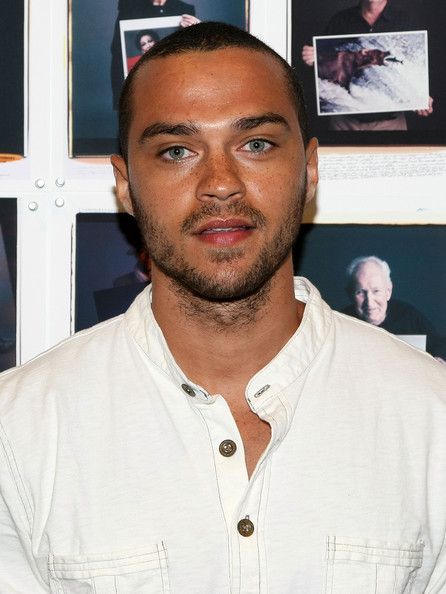
Actor-activist
Jesse Williams

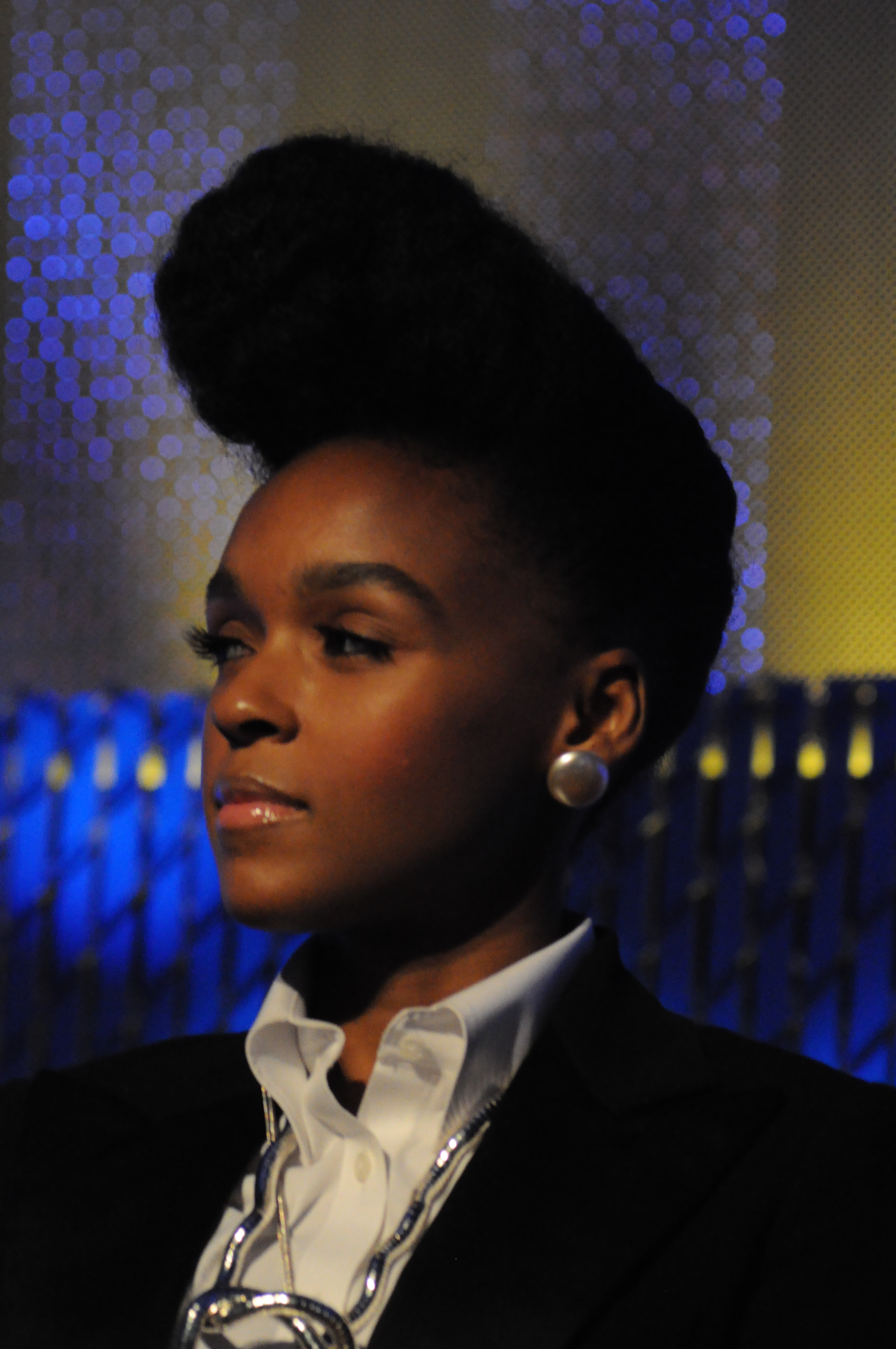
Singer
Janelle Monáe

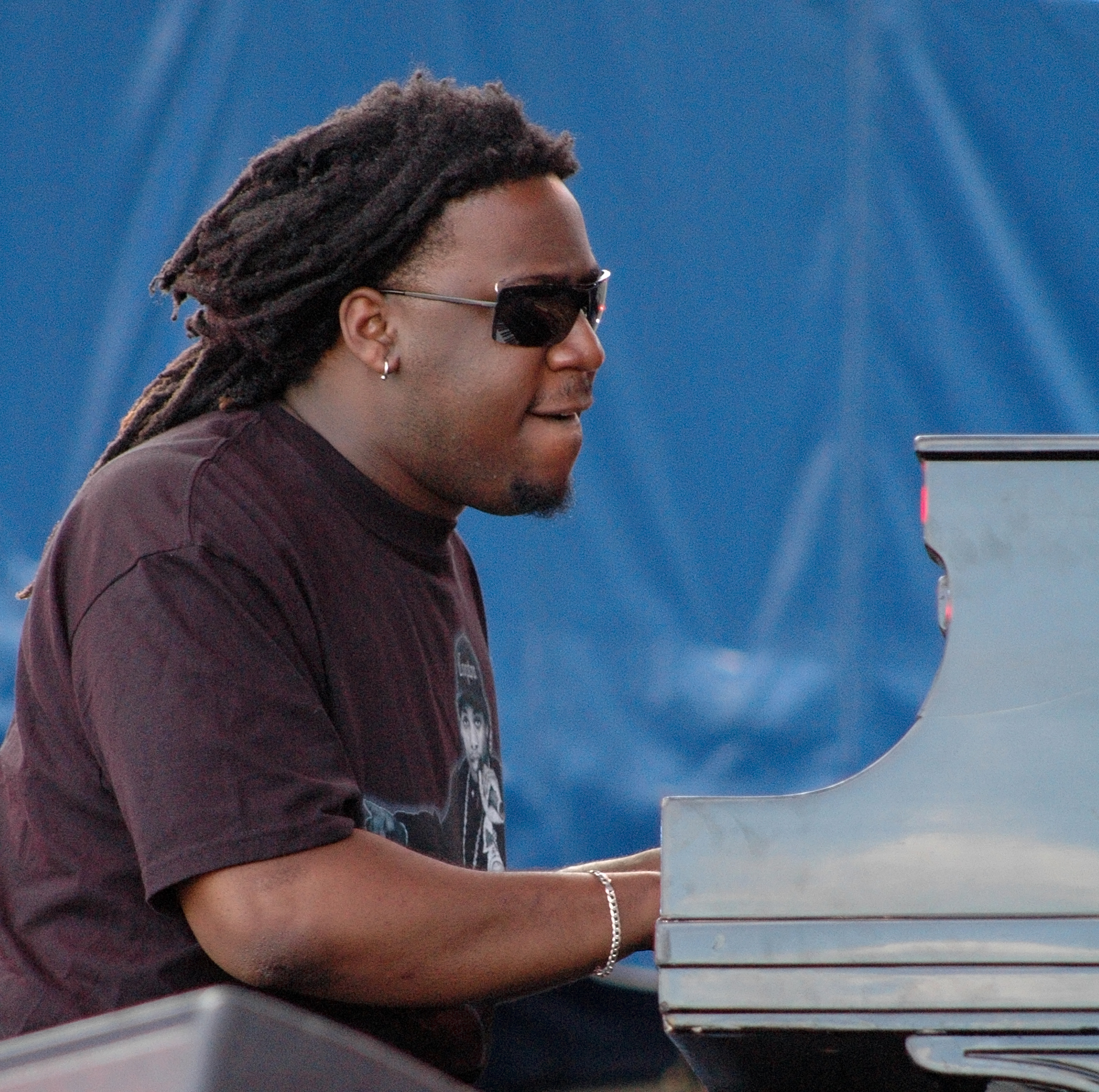
Singer-songwriter
Robert Glasper

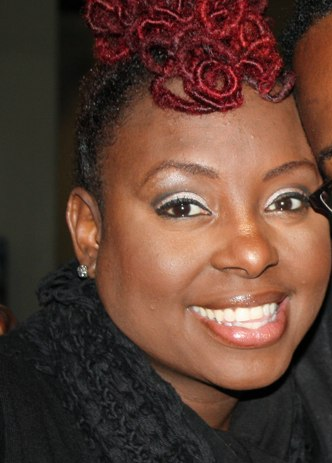
Singer
Ledisi

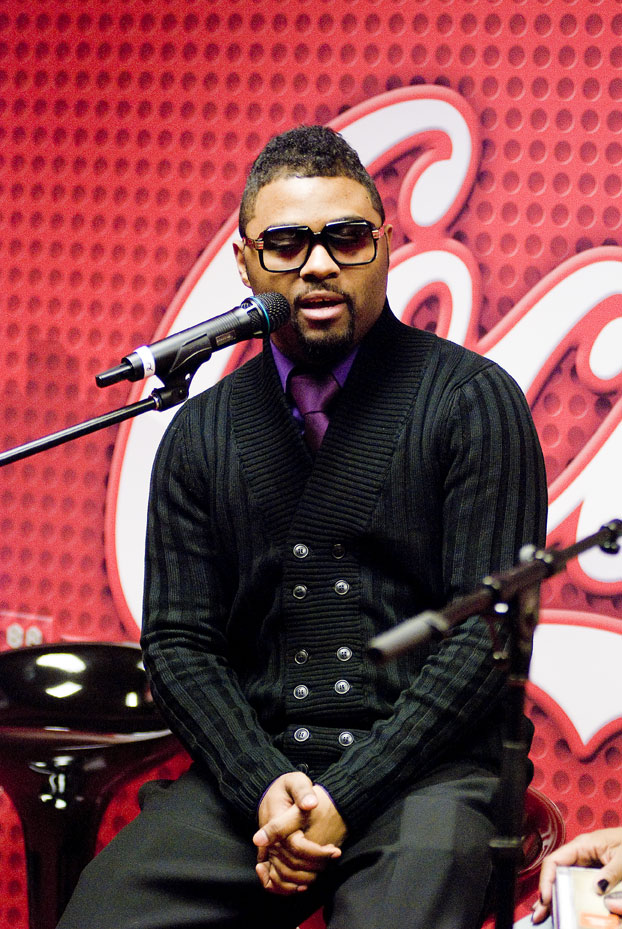
Singer-songwriter
Musiq Soulchild

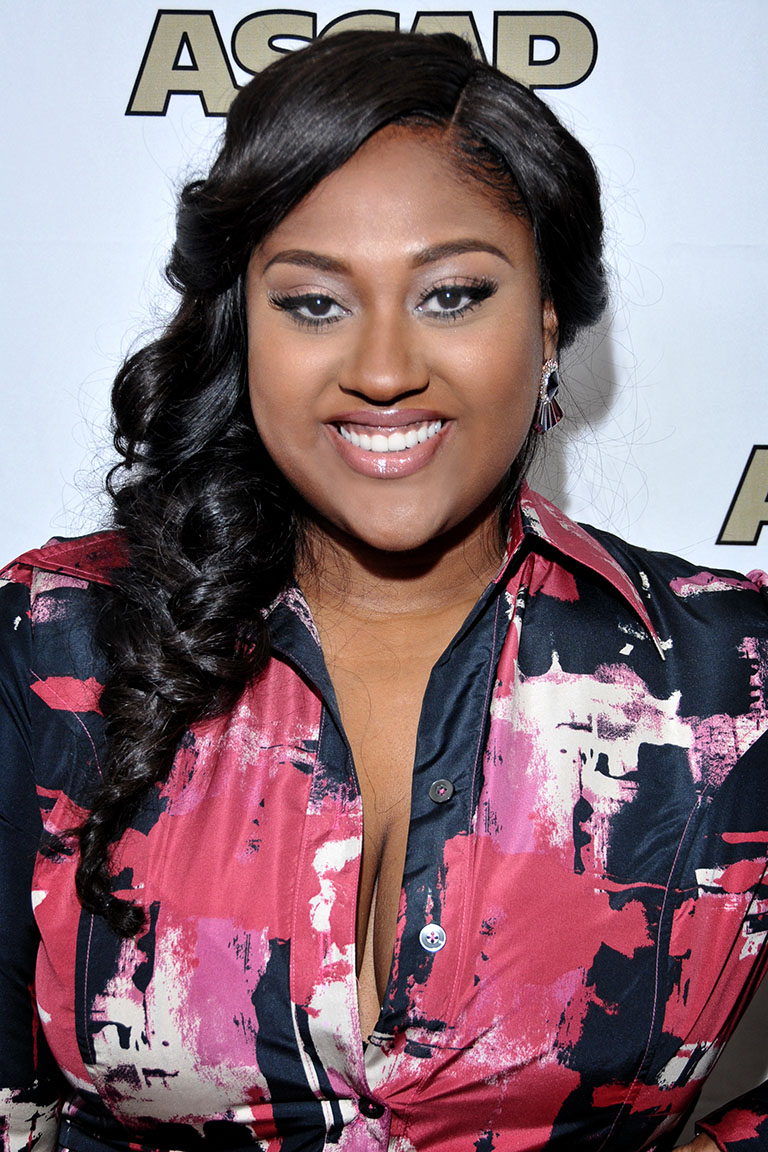
Singer-songwriter
Jazmine Sullivan

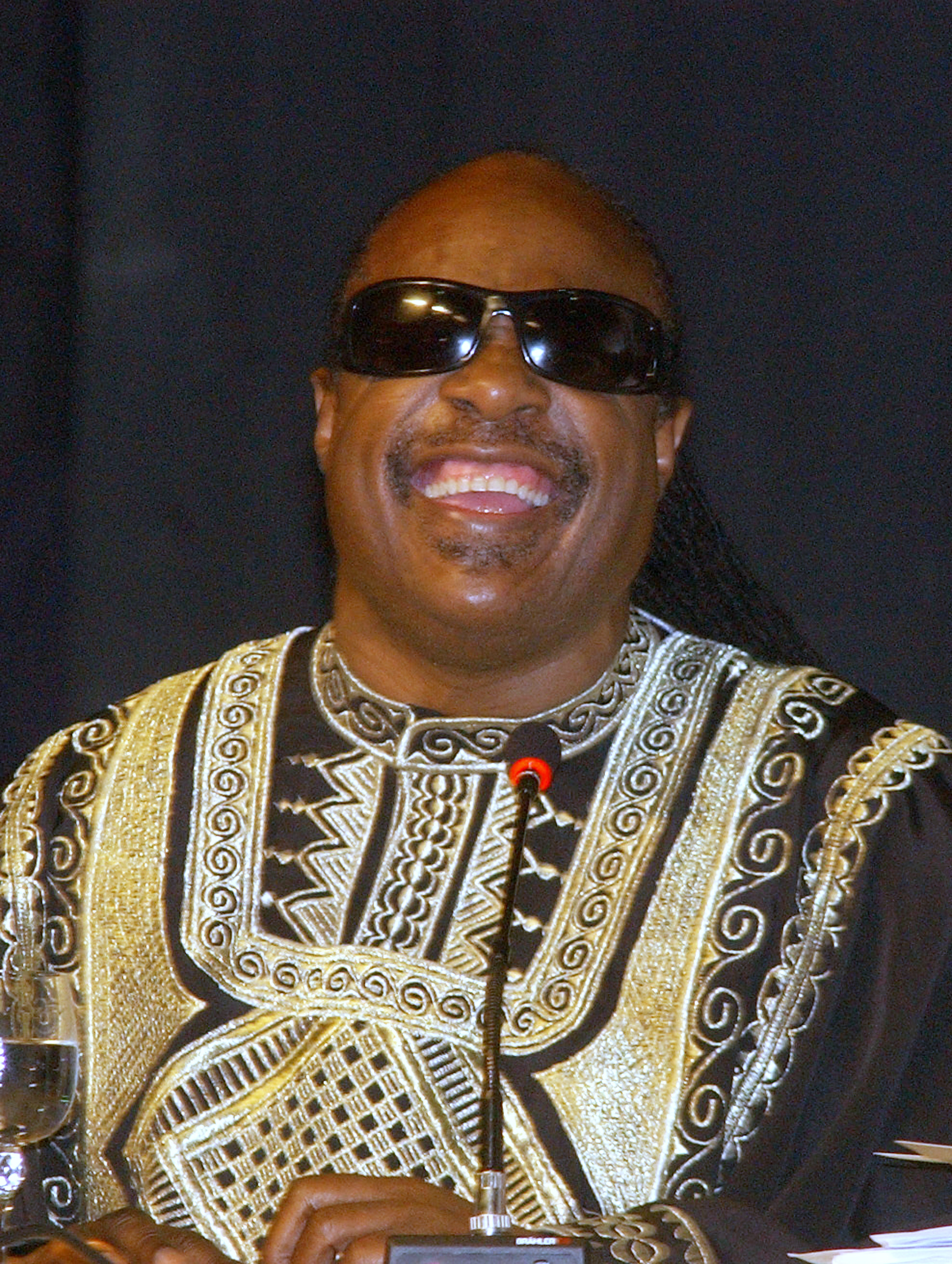
Singer
Stevie Wonder
