= Stutterer (film) =

- Film poster
- Directed by: Benjamin Cleary
- Written by: Benjamin Cleary
- Produced by: Serena Armitage; Shan Christopher Ogilvie
- Starring: Matthew Needham; Eric Richard; Chloe Pirrie
- Cinematography: Michael Paleodimos
- Edited by: Benjamin Cleary
- Music by: Nico Casal
- Production company: Bare Golly Films
- Distributed by: Amazon Instant Video
- Release date: 8 July 2015 (Galway Film Fleadh)
- Running time: 12 minutes
- Country: Ireland
- Language: English
- Budget: €5,500 (estimated)

Stutterer is a short drama film written and directed by Benjamin Cleary and produced by Serena Armitage and Shan Christopher Ogilvie.

== Plot ==
Greenwood, a lonely typographer, makes a phone call to discuss a bill issue, but his stutter keeps him from getting his words out, and he is hung up on. Later, in a conversation on Facebook, his online girlfriend Ellie says she has a surprise for Greenwood and will tell him the next day.

In public, Greenwood makes "snap judgement" observations about strangers he sees, clearly speaking the thoughts inside his head. While walking to his father's house, he practises in his head a quote he wants to mention to his father. While the two play a game of Go, Greenwood manages to get the quote out, albeit slowly, and his father is pleased. Later that night, Ellie nervously messages Greenwood, announcing that she is in London for a week and wants to meet him in person. Greenwood, on hold to attempt to deal with his bill problem still, does not respond, fearing to show her he has a stutter.

The next day, Greenwood is at his father's home and his father is on the phone arguing with the company about communicating with his son about his bill. Ellie sends another message, sad that Greenwood has not replied. He begins to craft a response with a made up excuse as to why he cannot meet her but changes his mind and does not reply.

The next morning, Greenwood begins learning sign language, pretending to be deaf to avoid speaking, though in his head he clearly answers people and wishes he could talk to them. He later has a moment of clarity and responds to Ellie, telling her he would love to meet her. That evening while waiting for a bus and nervously waiting for a reply, Greenwood intervenes when a man is assaulting a woman. The results of the intervention are seen when Greenwood has a bandage across his nose.

That night, while lonely and practising his sign and waiting for a reply from Ellie, Greenwood makes a snap judgment on himself, Greenwood observes that he is a poor communicator and is full of self-pity. But just as he is about to go to sleep, he hears the alert of a message reply. The reply is not shown, but Greenwood looks nervous and pleased. The next day he is shown getting ready and then travelling to see her, all the while practising what he will say to Ellie in his head.

Once he arrives, standing across the street, he witnesses as a stranger attempts to speak to Ellie from behind. She does not respond until he taps her shoulder and she turns to sign to him, showing that she is deaf. She makes eye contact with Greenwood and they both smile. She waves and signs to ask him to cross the street. He smiles and nods.

== Cast ==
- Matthew Needham as Greenwood Carsen
- Chloe Pirrie as Ellie Parks
- Eric Richard as Greenwood's Dad
- Richard Mason as Angry man at bus stop

== Critical reception ==
Stutterer won Best Live Action Short Film at the 88th Academy Awards in 2016.

== Awards and nominations ==
Award	Date of ceremony	Category	Recipients and nominees	Result
Academy Awards	28 February 2016	Best Live Action Short Film	Stutterer	Won
Aesthetica Short Film Festival	8 November 2015	Best Drama	Stutterer	Won
Crested Butte Film Festival	2 October 2016	Best Short Narrative	Stutterer	Won
DC Shorts Film Festival	20 September 2015	Audience Award	Stutterer	Won
Irish Film & Television Academy	9 April 2016	Best Short Film	Stutterer	Won
London Film Critics' Circle	17 January 2016	Best Short Film	Stutterer	Won
