= Last Day of Freedom =

2015 film by Dee Hibbert-Jones

- Directed by: Dee Hibbert-Jones; Nomi Talisman
- Written by: Dee Hibbert-Jones; Nomi Talisman
- Produced by: Dee Hibbert-Jones; Nomi Talisman
- Music by: Fred Frith
- Production company: Living Condition LLC
- Distributed by: SND Films
- Release date: April 11, 2015
- Running time: 32 minutes
- Country: United States
- Language: English

Last Day of Freedom is a 2015 American black and white and color animated short documentary film about racism, the US Criminal Justice System, and mental health issues. The documentary was well received by critics and earned numerous awards at various film festivals, and The International Documentary Association Best Short Documentary Award, at the 31st Annual IDA Documentary Awards. Last Day of Freedom was shortlisted with ten other documentaries from 74 entries submitted to 88th Academy Awards in Documentary Short Subject category, and eventually received a nomination in this category. In June 2016 the film won an Emmy Award for News and Program Specialty -Documentary-Topical, at the 45th Annual Northern California Area Emmy® Awards. The film was a finalist for a Documentary Short, 59th Cine Eagle Award.

== Synopsis ==
Bill Babbitt supported the death penalty, until it came knocking at his door. Bill fondly recalls early life with his brother Manny, but a childhood car accident leaves Manny forever changed. Two tours in Vietnam only compound Manny's mental health issues. After the war, bouts of paranoia leave him living on the streets. Concerned about his brother, Bill and his family invite Manny to come live with them in Sacramento. One day, however, Bill makes a shocking discovery that leaves him with an impossible choice: cover for his brother, or turn him in. Bill explores his attempt to do the “right” thing as familial bonds, mental illness and murder tug a close relationship in conflicting directions.

== Awards ==
- Academy Awards – Best Documentary – Short Subject – Nomination
- 45th Annual Northern California Area EMMY® Award
- International Documentary Association – Best Short Documentary Award, 31st Annual IDA Documentary Awards
- SIMA - Best Directors, Best Editing, & Stylistic Achievement Jury Prize Winner, 2017
- Finalist, Short Documentary, 59th Cine Eagle Awards
- Full Frame Documentary Film Festival
  - Best Short Jury Award
  - Duke University, The Center for Documentary Studies Filmmaker Award
- Hamptons International Film Festival – Best Documentary Short Film sponsored by ID Films.
- Tallgrass Film Festival – Golden Strands Award, Outstanding Documentary Short Film.
- Dok Leipzig – International Competition Animated Documentary – Honorary Mention
- Bar Harbor Film Festival – Best Animated Documentary Short
- SF Doc Fest- Best Short Audience Award
- (In)Justice For All Film Festival – Justice Impact Award
- Atlanta Docufest – Best Experimental Documentary Short
- DC Independent Film Festival - Best Short Documentary ^{17}

== See also ==
- Mental illness in film
- Death penalty
