= Dee Hibbert-Jones =

American film director

- Born: United Kingdom
- Occupations: Film director, producer and animator
- Years active: 2011–present
- Known for: Last Day of Freedom

Dee Hibbert-Jones is a film director, producer and animator.

She is best known for co-producing and co-directing the short-documentary Last Day of Freedom (32 mins) for which she received an Academy Award for Best Documentary (Short Subject) nomination at the 88th Academy Awards, with Nomi Talisman, an Emmy Award (Northern CA) and the IDA Best Short Documentary Award.

Hibbert-Jones is an Associate Professor of Art and Digital Art New Media at the University of California, Santa Cruz, where she is founder and Co-Director of SPARC at UCSC a Social Practice Arts Research Center. Hibbert-Jones and Talisman were awarded a Guggenheim Fellowship They won an Emmy Award for Last Day of Freedom, at the 45th Annual Northern California Emmy® Awards (News and Program Speciality - Documentary Topical), the Filmmaker Award from the Center for Documentary Studies at Duke, and a Gideon Award for support to Indigent Communities.

Currently, they are nominated for the 2016 Congressional Black Caucus Veterans Braintrust Award. Among Dee Hibbert-Jones' festival awards are: Best Short Full Frame Documentary Film Festival, Best Short Documentary Hamptons International Film Festival, Golden Strands Award, Outstanding Documentary Short, Tall Grass KS, Best Experimental Short, Atlanta Docufest, Impact Award (In) Justice for All, and the 2015 Platinum Award Winner Spotlight Documentary Series.

Hibbert-Jones is a MacDowell Colony Fellow, a Yerba Buena Center for the Arts Fellow and Headlands Center For the Arts Alumni. She holds an MFA from Mills College Oakland, MA York University, PGCE from Durham University and a BA from London University.

Born in the UK she lives in San Francisco CA.

== Filmography ==
- Last Day of Freedom (2015)
- I-140 (2012)
- Are We There Yet? (2011)

== Awards and nominations ==
- Hibbert- Jones shared following awards and nominations with Talisman:
- 2016 Fellow of the John Simon Guggenheim Memorial Foundation
- 2016 California Public Defenders Association, Gideon Award (film), for Last Day of Freedom (with Nomi Talisman and Bill Babbitt)
- 2015: Academy Awards
  - Best Documentary - Short Subject
- 2015: Full Frame Documentary Film Festival
  - Best Short Film - Jury Award
  - Duke University, The Center for Documentary Studies Filmmaker Award
- 2015: Hamptons International Film Festival
  - Golden Starfish Award - Best Documentary Short Film sponsored by ID Films.
- 2015: International Documentary Association
  - Best Short Documentary Award.
