= Score bug =

On-screen graphic in sports broadcasting

A score bug is a digital on-screen graphic which is displayed in a broadcast of a sporting event, displaying the current score and other statistics. It is similar in function to a scoreboard, and is usually placed at either the top or lower third of the television screen.

== History ==
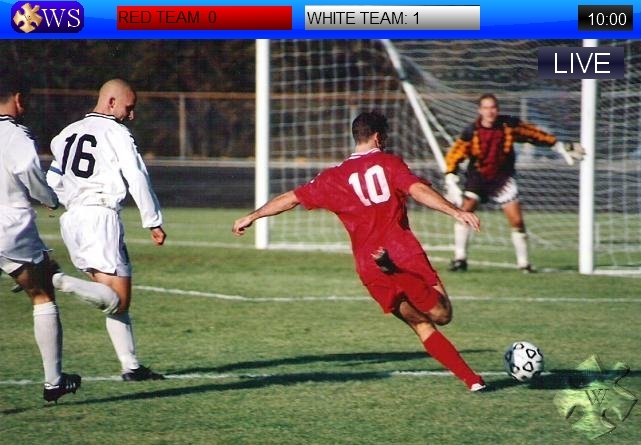
A typical score bug on a televised sporting event will consist of the station logo alongside the current score of game, and other information, such as time elapsed.

The concept of a persistent score bug was devised by Sky Sports head David Hill, who was dissatisfied over having to wait to see what the score was after tuning into a football match in-progress. The score bug was introduced when Sky launched its coverage of the then newly-formed English Premier League in August 1992. Hill's boss repeatedly demanded that the graphic be removed, describing it as the "stupidest thing [he] had ever seen". Hill defied the boss's demands and kept the graphic in place. ITV introduced a score bug at the start of the 1993–94 football season, and the BBC introduced a score bug towards the end of 1993.

The concept was introduced to the United States by ABC Sports and ESPN during coverage of the 1994 FIFA World Cup. Their justification for the graphic was to provide a location for a rotating series of sponsor logos, in order to allow matches to air without commercial interruption.

With the acquisition of rights to the National Football League (NFL) by BSkyB's American sibling Fox (a fellow venture of Rupert Murdoch), Hill became the first president of Fox Sports. Under Hill's leadership, Fox introduced a version of the score bug branded as the "Fox Box", which was part of its inaugural season of NFL coverage in 1994. The score bug soon became a ubiquitous feature for American football broadcasts, along with almost all American sports broadcasts in the years that followed.

Dick Ebersol of NBC Sports initially opposed the idea of a score bug, as he thought that fans would dislike seeing more graphics on the screen and would change the channel from blowout games if the score was constantly being displayed.

== Details ==
Score bugs used in team sports typically include the names of both teams, an abbreviation of the team's name, and/or the team's flag or logo; for individual sports, they include the names of individual competitors. In sports where a game clock or playing periods are used, those are generally also displayed as part of the score bug. Some broadcasts also include teams' win-loss records. They are also occasionally used to display statistics graphics, as well as sponsor logos.

The overall design of a score bug is usually intended for visual clarity and legibility, especially when displayed on video with large amounts of motion; they are usually built around the corporate branding of the broadcaster or event. In the late-2010s and 2020s, some U.S. broadcasters began to change the designs of their score bugs to suit the needs of viewership on devices with smaller screens (such as smartphones), including bugs noticeably larger than prior iterations designed with television viewing in mind, and graphics kept towards a bottom-center safe area in some sports (particularly basketball and gridiron football) so that they remain visible in footage cropped for vertical and square videos on social media.

In internationally-televised events (such as the FIFA World Cup and Olympic Games for example), a score bug and other graphics are often supplied within the "world feed" provided by the host broadcaster, but broadcasters may have the ability to take clean feeds to run their own graphics for localization purposes (which may or may not follow the exact design or functionality of the host feed).

Some score bugs may include statistics related to sports betting, such as the over–under and lines. This is often limited to one-off alternate broadcasts produced with a gambling focus, although ESPN regularly included this information on its broadcasts of the revived XFL (with this feature persisting into its successor, the UFL). In 2024, ESPN experimented with adding a persistent win probability meter to its bug in Major League Baseball, which was based on input from its statisticians. In the 2020s, the Cleveland Cavaliers of the NBA began to persistently display the team's score differential on their score bug, dubbed "The Diff"; the practice stems from owner Dan Gilbert's use of "[being] the diff[erence]" as a mantra among the team's players and staff. "The Diff" has been displayed in-arena, and is used as part of the team's marketing and community outreach.

=== Variations ===
In addition to the above information, score bugs in some sports include additional information:

- In baseball, score bugs display the current inning, number of outs, a graphic displaying which bases are occupied. the include names of the current pitcher and batter, the pitcher's pitch count, and the number of balls and strikes accrued by the batter. In the 2023 and 2026 Major League Baseball seasons, most broadcasters modified their score bugs to include the pitch clock and number of Automated Ball-Strike System (ABS) challenges remaining respectively.
- In basketball, score bugs generally include the shot clock, the number of fouls accrued by each team, and whether a team is in the bonus.
- In cricket, score bugs often take the form of larger "tickers" across the bottom of the screen, displaying the current team up and their number of runs, wickets, and overs, a display showing the runs scored and number of balls faced by the current batting partnership, and statistics for the opposing team's bowler (including the number of wickets scored and runs given up).
- In Association football, score bugs typically use minimalist designs in the top-left corner of the screen, with additional displays for their kit colours and indicators for stoppage time. Some score bugs in football may also display indicators for red cards issued to a team, and the number of substitutions remaining.
- In gridiron football, score bugs usually include the play clock and the down and distance of the current play; they also incorporate graphics indicating when a penalty flag has been thrown.
- In ice hockey, score bugs display when a penalty or power play is in effect, and often include the number of shots on goal accrued by each team.
- In golf, Fox popularized the display of a persistent leaderboard graphic in the bottom-right of the screen, usually displaying the top 5.

==== Racing ====
Telecasts of automobile races often include a score bug with the current positions of participants, statistics such as distance behind the leader, and the remaining distance or number of laps. In the mid-2010s, NASCAR broadcasters such as Fox began to transition from horizontal tickers to vertical leaderboards (also referred to as "pylons", in reference to the physical scoring pylons at some racetracks). The CW differentiated itself by using a horizontal display that divides the field into multiple columns along the bottom of the screen.

== Reception ==
The behavior and appearance of score bugs and other graphics have frequently been considered part of the overall reception of sports broadcasters by sportswriters and viewers (especially on social media) alike, with broadcasters sometimes having to make adjustments in response to feedback, if possible:

- Prior to their ubiquity, early reception to the concept of score bugs were mixed; Variety criticized Fox's initial score bug for the NFL as an "annoying see-through clock and score graphic", and expressed concern for people "who actually watched the beginning of the game and would rather have their screen clear of graphics". David Hill even received a death threat from an irate viewer, with a specific emphasis on him being a "foreigner".
- During the 2015 Cricket World Cup, New Zealand media writer Russell Brown was critical of an unconventional score bug design implemented by host broadcaster Star Sports (which placed runs in the top-left of the screen, in addition to a dashboard of batter and bowler stats with photos of the players along the bottom), stating that it "[looked] like something the 80s called to say it didn't want back", and that the cameramen struggled on one delivery to find a suitable camera angle that was unobstructed by the graphics.
- Marquee Sports Network dropped an unconventional bottom-center score bug for Chicago Cubs games for a more traditional design in 2021, as part of a larger series of changes in response to feedback from its inaugural season.
- A common complaint in American football have been graphics utilizing colors close to gold or yellow, either for aesthetic purposes, or to represent teams using it as part of their jersey colors, since they could be confused for called penalties (which are also typically signified with yellow graphics). In 2019, ESPN modified a newly-introduced score bug on Monday Night Football over halftime to replace a lime-green colored down and distance display that was criticized by viewers: Chicago Tribune media writer Phil Rosenthal wrote that "the quickness with which ESPN abandoned this unnecessary bit of flash probably speaks more to how misguided this latest supposed 'innovation' was than any increased sensitivity to the twitterati." The network has faced similar criticism during the College Football Playoff for using gold colors on down and distance graphics.

In some cases, specific states of score bugs have become part of the lore of teams, such as Super Bowl LI's display of the Atlanta Falcons leading 28–3 in the third quarter before the New England Patriots' comeback victory, and Philadelphia Phillies–Pittsburgh Pirates games on NBC Sports Philadelphia humorously causing its score bug to display "POOP" at the beginning of games using a combination of the two teams' cap insignias and a 0-0 score (to the point that Phillies play-by-play announcer Tom McCarthy gave the network's previous graphics a tongue-in-cheek eulogy upon their first meeting in the 2025 season after NBC adopted a new design without cap insignias).

== See also ==
- Character generator
- Intertitle
