= Shan Christopher Ogilvie =

Shan Christopher Ogilvie is a Malaysian-born British producer and director. He is best known for producing the short film Stutterer, directed by Benjamin Cleary, which won the Academy Award for Best Live Action Short Film at the 88th Academy Awards.

== Career ==
Shan studied film at University of Westminster and has made over 15 shorts in a variety of roles, filmed concerts and live events, directed brand videos for the likes of Vodafone, Citibank and O2 (United Kingdom), and has worked in television. Most recently he shot a documentary for Channel 5 (UK) on the Moors Murderer Ian Brady. He is the founder of Bare Golly Films.

== Filmography ==
- Stutterer
