= Hamish Purdy =

Canadian Set Decorator

- Born: Vancouver, British Columbia, Canada
- Occupations: Art director and Set decorator
- Years active: 1992-present

Hamish Purdy (born in Vancouver, British Columbia, Canada) is a Canadian art director and set decorator.

He attended UVic and UBC before making the move into film and TV.

Purdy has worked on several well-known films, including Man of Steel in 2013, Watchmen in 2009 and Rise of the Planet of the Apes in 2011.

When interviewed about his work, he claims that he takes inspiration from other excellent set designs, as well as when he successfully completes a piece of work.

He was nominated at the 88th Academy Awards in the category of Best Production Design for his work on the film The Revenant. His nomination was shared with Jack Fisk.
