= The Curve (2020 film) =

2020 documentary film by Adam Benzine

- Film poster
- Directed by: Adam Benzine
- Written by: Adam Benzine
- Produced by: Adam Benzine
- Edited by: Tiffany Beaudin
- Music by: Joel Goodman
- Production company: Jet Black Iris
- Release date: October 27, 2020 (internet)
- Running time: 59 minutes
- Country: Canada
- Language: English

The Curve is a 2020 Canadian documentary film written, directed, and produced by Adam Benzine. It is about the United States' response to the COVID-19 pandemic. It was released on the internet on October 27, 2020, a week before the United States presidential election.

== Production ==
According to Benzine, the production was moderately funded and he ran out of cash. He launched a Kickstarter campaign to help fund the film and it was successful.

== Reception ==
Chris Knight of the National Post gave the film four out of five stars and wrote, "Benzine's film is a fantastic primer on recent events, though its short running time leaves several key issues – the long-term lack of pandemic preparedness over multiple administrations, the link between COVID-19 deaths and poor, Black communities – feeling underexplored. And of course, the unfinished nature of the pandemic means it ends somewhat abruptly. But as a snapshot of a moment in history, it can't be beat."

Norman Wilner of NOW gave the film a positive review, writing, "It doesn't just present the Trump administration's disastrous incompetence in the face of the novel coronavirus, but digs into the reasons for that incompetence, both ideologically and strategically."

== See also ==
- Totally Under Control
