= David Hill (producer) =

American film producer (born 1946)

- Born: May 21, 1946 (age 80); Newcastle, New South Wales
- Occupation: Television executive
- Awards: Pete Rozelle Radio-Television Award (2017) from the Pro Football Hall of Fame

David Hill AM (born May 21, 1946) is an Australian-born American executive producer who served as the president of Fox Sports from 1993 to 2000, and as a senior EVP of 21st Century Fox for twenty-four years.

== Career ==
Hill started his career working as a copyboy at the Sydney Daily Telegraph aged 17.

He moved to Nine Network aged 19, to work as a reporter, where he moved his way up to VP of sports and caught the attention of Rupert Murdoch.

Hill was hired at 21st Century Fox in 1988 to help launch Sky Television and Eurosport. After the merger of Sky Television and British Sky Broadcasting (BSkyB), Hill took over the sports channel and, in 1991, created Sky Sports.

In 1993, Hill moved to the United States and led the startup of Fox Sports and NFL on Fox, when the network won National Football League TV broadcasting rights. Hill was president of Fox Sports from 1993 to 2000 and introduced many new concepts, including the FoxBox (a form of score bug), the 1st & Ten virtual first down line and making the broadcasts more entertaining. He was named chairman of the Fox network until 1999, when he was named chairman of Fox Sports Media Group. In 2013, Hill launched the national Fox Sports channel.

He left the Fox Group in June 2015 to open his own production company, Hilly, that focused on live TV events.

In 2014, Hill became a chairman of National Geographic Channels. He also served as an executive producer of the American version of The X Factor and the fifteenth season of American Idol.

In 2017, Liberty Media hired Hill as an adviser to help modernize Formula 1's broadcast package.

== Academy Award producer ==
Hill, along with Reginald Hudlin, was chosen to produce the 88th Academy Awards.

== Filmography ==
- Fox NFL Sunday
- NHL on FOX
- Daytona 500: The Great American Race Pre-Race Show
- 2008 NASCAR Samsung 500
- 2008 Crown Royal Presents the Dan Lowry 400
- 2011 World Series
- American Idol (2014–2015)
- The X Factor
- 88th Academy Awards (with Reginald Hudlin)

== Awards and honours ==
Hill won an Outstanding Live Sports Special award at 33rd Sports Emmys for producing 2011 World Series. In 2017, he received the Pete Rozelle Radio-Television Award from the Pro Football Hall of Fame.

In 2014, he was inducted into the Sports Broadcasting Hall of Fame.

Member of the Order of Australia (AM), Awarded on 10 June 2002 Award event The Queen's Birthday 2002 Honours List. Citation - For service to the media, particularly as an innovative contributor to the development of quality sports broadcasting.
