= Nomi Talisman =

American film director, producer, cinematographer, and animator (born 1966)

- נומי טליסמן
- Born: 1966 (age 59–60); Israel
- Occupations: Film producer and director
- Website: nomitalisman.net

Nomi Talisman (Hebrew: נעמי טליתמן; born 1968) is an Israeli-born, American film director, producer, cinematographer and animator.

She is best known for co-producing and co-directing short-documentary Last Day of Freedom for which she received Academy Award for Best Documentary (Short Subject) nomination at 88th Academy Awards, with Dee Hibbert-Jones. In April 2016, Hibbert-Jones and Talisman were awarded a Guggenheim Fellowship, and won an Emmy Award for Last Day of Freedom, at the 45th Annual Northern California Emmy Awards (News and Program Speciality - Documentary Topical). In 2019, Talisman and Hibbert-Jones were awarded a Creative Capital Award to work on their next feature-length animated documentary Run With It

== Biography ==
Talisman was born in 1968 in Israel. In 2001, Talisman moved to the Bay Area, where she lives and works as a freelance media maker. Her media work with legal mitigation specialists has enabled her to build relationships of trust with the prisoners and families whose stories are part of Talisman and Hibbert-Jones’ project, Living Condition.

== Filmography ==
- Last Day of Freedom (2015)

== Awards and nominations ==
Nomi shared following awards and nominations with Hibbert-Jones:

- 2019 Creative Capital Award for Run With It, a feature-length animated doc (with Dee Hibbert-Jones)
- 2016 Fellow of the John Simon Guggenheim Memorial Foundation
- 2016 California Public Defenders Association, Gideon Award (film), for Last Day of Freedom (with Dee Hibbert-Jones and Bill Babbitt)
- 2016 Veterans Braintrust Award, Black Congressional Caucus, with Dee Hibbert-Jones, for Last Day of Freedom
- 2016 The 45th Annual Northern California Area EMMY® Award, Documentary-Topical
- 2015: Academy Awards nomination:
  - Best Documentary - Short Subject
- 2015: International Documentary Association
  - Best Short Documentary Award.
- 2015: Full Frame Documentary Film Festival
  - Best Short Film - Jury Award
  - Duke University, The Center for Documentary Studies Filmmaker Award
- 2015: Hamptons International Film Festival
  - Golden Starfish Award - Best Documentary Short Film sponsored by ID Films.
  - Other Festivals (partial list):
    - Tallgrass Film Festival – Golden Strands Award, Outstanding Documentary Short Film.^{8}
    - Dok Leipzig – International Competition Animated Documentary – Honorary Mention^{[9]}
    - Bar Harbor Film Festival – Best Animated Documentary Short^{[10]}
    - SF Doc Fest- Best Short Audience Award^{[11]}
    - (In)Justice For All Film Festival – Justice Impact Award
    - Atlanta Docufest – Best Experimental Documentary Short^{[12]}
    - DC Independent Film Festival - Best Short Documentary ^{[13]}
