= Claude Lanzmann: Spectres of the Shoah =

2015 documentary short film by Adam Benzine

- Film poster
- Directed by: Adam Benzine
- Produced by: Adam Benzine; Kimberley Warner
- Starring: Claude Lanzmann
- Cinematography: Alex Ordanis
- Edited by: Tiffany Beaudin
- Music by: Joel Goodman; Benjamin Krause
- Production companies: Jet Black Iris America; ZDF / DR
- Distributed by: HBO (US)
- Release dates: April 25, 2015 (Hot Docs); May 2, 2016 (HBO)
- Running time: 40 minutes
- Countries: Canada; United States; United Kingdom; Germany
- Languages: French; English; German

Claude Lanzmann: Spectres of the Shoah is a 2015 documentary-short film exploring the life and work of French director Claude Lanzmann. The film was written, directed, and produced by British filmmaker and journalist Adam Benzine.

== Production background ==
The documentary explores the 12-year journey undertaken by Lanzmann to make his 1985 film Shoah, a nine-and-a-half-hour-long documentary about the Holocaust. In Spectres of the Shoah, Lanzmann details the practical and emotional challenges he faced from 1973 to 1985, explaining his efforts to convince traumatized death camp survivors to recount their Second World War experiences; the dangers he faced in tracking down and secretly filming SS Officers illegally; his own teenage years spent fighting in the French Resistance; his romance with Simone de Beauvoir and friendship with Jean-Paul Sartre; as well as his difficulties in composing into a single cohesive narrative more than 200 hours of material he collected.

In making the short documentary, Benzine and his team worked with the United States Holocaust Memorial Museum to secure a wide range of previously unseen outtake material, which was originally filmed during the making of Shoah, in order to help tell Lanzmann's personal story.

== Release ==
Claude Lanzmann: Spectres of the Shoah had its world premiere on April 25, 2015, almost 30 years to the day that Shoah was released, at the Hot Docs film festival in Toronto, Canada, where it won an Honourable Mention in the Best Mid-Length Documentary Competition.

During the festival, U.S. premium cable network HBO acquired the American TV rights to the film. Sheffield Doc/Fest hosted the European Premiere of the film in June 2015, and the San Francisco Jewish Film Festival hosted the U.S. festival premiere for the film on July 28, at the Castro Theater in San Francisco.

The film continued its festival run throughout the fall of 2015 with its London premiere at the UK Jewish Film Festival, and international screenings at the Camden International Film Festival, the Hamptons International Film Festival, the Vienna International Film Festival, the Hot Springs Documentary Film Festival, the Vancouver Jewish Film Festival, DOC NYC in New York, and IDFA in Amsterdam.

Franco-German broadcaster ARTE broadcast the doc on January 27, 2016, as did the CBC's Documentary Channel in Canada and SVT in Sweden, while HBO broadcast the U.S. premiere of the film on May 2 of the same year. Danish broadcaster DR, which along with ZDF/ARTE was an early investor in the film, will broadcast it in 2017.

Claude Lanzmann was the first motion picture to be released as a non-fungible token (NFT) on March 15, 2021. Ten 'first edition' tokens were offered for auction via the blockchain auction site Rarible.

== Reception ==
The film has met with widespread critical acclaim as it has played at film festivals, theatrically and on television. The Toronto Star described the film as "a stunning revelation to both people who have seen Shoah and people who have not" in its Hot Docs review, while the San Francisco Chronicle described it as "fascinating." In a four-star review, NOW billed the film as "an essential supplement to one of the most important documentaries ever made," while The Globe and Mail rated the doc 3.5 out of 4, saying it was both "fascinating and upsetting."

=== Awards and nominations ===
Award / Event	Date of ceremony	Category	Result
88th Academy Awards	28 February 2016	Best Documentary Short Subject	Nominated
38th Rockie Awards	12 June 2017	Best History & Biography Program	Nominated
38th Rockie Awards	12 June 2017	Best Francophone Program	Nominated
2017 Canadian Screen Awards	7 March 2017	Best Direction in a Documentary Program	Nominated
2017 Canadian Screen Awards	7 March 2017	Best Picture Editing in a Documentary Program or Series	Nominated
2017 Canadian Screen Awards	7 March 2017	Best Original Music for a Non-Fiction Program or Series	Nominated
2017 Canadian Screen Awards	7 March 2017	Barbara Sears Award for Best Visual Research	Nominated
2016 Canadian Cinema Editors Awards	2 June 2016	Best Editing in Documentary - Short Form	Won
9th Cinema Eye Honors	13 January 2016	Outstanding Achievement in Nonfiction Short Filmmaking	Nominated
44th Grierson Awards	7 November 2016	Best Newcomer Documentary	Nominated
22nd Hot Docs Film Festival	1 May 2015	Best Mid-Length Documentary Competition	Honourable Mention
31st IDA Documentary Awards	5 December 2015	Best Documentary Short Film	Nominated
14th Warsaw Jewish Film Festival	27 November 2016	Best Short Documentary	Won
11th Los Angeles Italia Film Festival	21 February 2016	Best Short Film of the Year	Won
18th Thessaloniki Documentary Festival	20 March 2016	Audience Award for Best International Short Documentary	Won

== Director's cut ==
A feature length director's cut of the film, titled The Death and Love of Claude Lanzmann, was released on video on demand on December 14, 2025, marking the 10th anniversary of the film.
