= Serena Armitage =

UK-born Irish film producer

Serena Armitage is a director and producer from North Yorkshire, UK. She is best known for producing the short film Stutterer that earned her an Academy Award for Best Live Action Short Film at the 88th Academy Awards with director Benjamin Cleary.

== Filmography ==
- Flux Gourmet
- Stutterer
- The Birth Of Valerie Venus
- FOG
- Paul O'Grady: For the Love of Dogs
- Come Dine with Me
- Piers Morgan's Life Stories
