= Benjamin Cleary =

Irish writer, director and producer

Benjamin Cleary is an Irish writer, director and producer from Dublin. He is best known for his short-film Stutterer that earned him an Academy Award for Best Live Action Short Film at the 88th Academy Awards with producers Shan Christopher Ogilvie and Serena Armitage.

== Career ==
Cleary graduated from University College Dublin with a BBLS Degree (Bachelor of Business & Legal Studies) in 2006. He then moved to England, where he completed his Screenwriting MA from London Film School. In 2015 he wrote, directed and edited his first short film Stutterer. It stars Matthew Needham and Chloe Pirrie. The film has been accepted into 75 plus festivals at time of writing and has won over 20 awards including the London Critic's Circle award, an Irish Film and Television Award, the Audience Award and the Best International Short Film Award at the Kerry Film Festival. It also won the Best Foreign Film at the prestigious LA Shorts Fest. This award qualified Stutterer onto the long-list for an Oscar, which it went on to win for Best Live Action Short. Cleary won a Cannes Young Director Award and Best New Director at the Kinsale Sharks Awards 2016. He also wrote Love Is A Sting, which had been long-listed for an Oscar 2017 after winning two qualifying festivals, Best Foreign film at LA Shorts Film Festival 2016 and Grand Prix best Irish film at Cork International Film Festival. In 2016 he was awarded UCD Alumnus of the Year in Law.

== Filmography ==
- Wave
- Stutterer
- Love Is A Sting
- The Great Fall
- Trumpet
- Kindred
- Swan Song
