= 88th Academy Awards =

- Official poster
- Date: February 28, 2016
- Site: Dolby Theatre; Hollywood, Los Angeles, California, U.S.
- Hosted by: Chris Rock
- Preshow hosts: Jess Cagle; Amy Robach; Robin Roberts; Lara Spencer; Michael Strahan; Joe Zee
- Produced by: David Hill; Reginald Hudlin
- Directed by: Glenn Weiss

Highlights
- Best Picture: Spotlight
- Most awards: Mad Max: Fury Road (6)
- Most nominations: The Revenant (12)

TV in the United States
- Network: ABC
- Duration: 3 hours, 37 minutes
- Ratings: 34.425 million 23.4% (Nielsen ratings)

The 88th Academy Awards ceremony, presented by the Academy of Motion Picture Arts and Sciences (AMPAS), honored the best films of 2015 and took place on February 28, 2016, at the Dolby Theatre in Hollywood, Los Angeles, 5:30 p.m. PST. During the ceremony, AMPAS presented Academy Awards (commonly referred to as Oscars) in 24 categories. The ceremony, televised in the United States by ABC, was produced by David Hill and Reginald Hudlin and directed by Glenn Weiss. Actor Chris Rock hosted the show for the second time, having previously hosted the 77th ceremony held in 2005.

In related events, the academy held its 7th Annual Governors Awards ceremony at the Grand Ballroom of the Hollywood and Highland Center on November 14, 2015. On February 13, 2016, in a ceremony at the Beverly Wilshire Hotel in Beverly Hills, California, the Academy Awards for Technical Achievement were presented by hosts Olivia Munn and Jason Segel.

Spotlight won two awards, including Best Picture, making it the first film since The Greatest Show on Earth to win Best Picture while only winning one other award. Mad Max: Fury Road won six awards, the most for the evening. The Revenant earned three awards including Best Director for Alejandro G. Iñárritu and Best Actor for Leonardo DiCaprio, his first win after five previous nominations spanning two decades. Brie Larson won Best Actress for Room, while Mark Rylance and Alicia Vikander won supporting acting honors for Bridge of Spies and The Danish Girl, respectively. The telecast garnered 34.425 million viewers in the United States.

== Winners and nominees ==
The nominees for the 88th Academy Awards were announced on January 14, 2016, at 5:30 a.m. PST (13:30 UTC), at the Samuel Goldwyn Theater in Beverly Hills, California, by directors Guillermo del Toro and Ang Lee, Academy president Cheryl Boone Isaacs, and actor John Krasinski. The Revenant led all nominees with twelve nominations; Mad Max: Fury Road came in second with ten.

The winners were announced during the awards ceremony on February 28, 2016. With two Oscars, Spotlight was the first film since 1952's The Greatest Show on Earth to win Best Picture with only one other award. Alejandro G. Iñárritu became the third individual to win two consecutive Oscars for Best Director. (Note: The two previous directors to have done so are: John Ford and Joseph L. Mankiewicz) By virtue of his previous nomination for his portrayal of the titular character in 1976's Rocky, Best Supporting Actor nominee Sylvester Stallone was the sixth person to be nominated for playing the same role in two different films. At 25, Jennifer Lawrence became the youngest person to earn their fourth acting nomination.

At the age of 87, Ennio Morricone was believed to be the oldest competitive winner in Oscar history. (Note: An Academy spokeswoman said, "We do not have this kind of data for the other competitive categories." However she also acknowledged that they have no knowledge of any competitive winner older than 87.) Having previously won for Gravity and Birdman, Emmanuel Lubezki became the first person to win three consecutive Best Cinematography awards.

=== Awards ===
Winners are listed first and highlighted in boldface and marked with a double-dagger (‡).

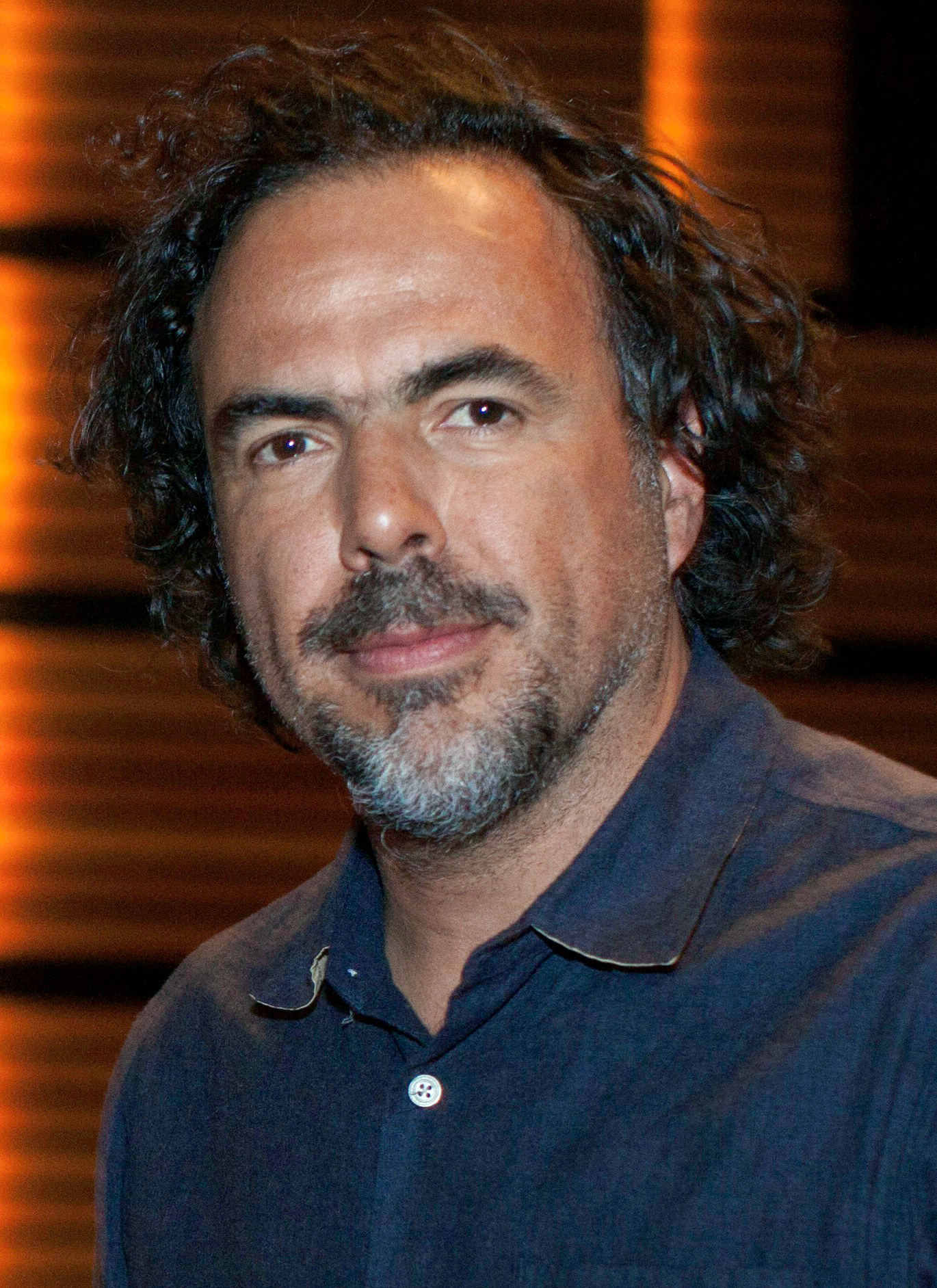
Alejandro González Iñárritu, Best Director winner

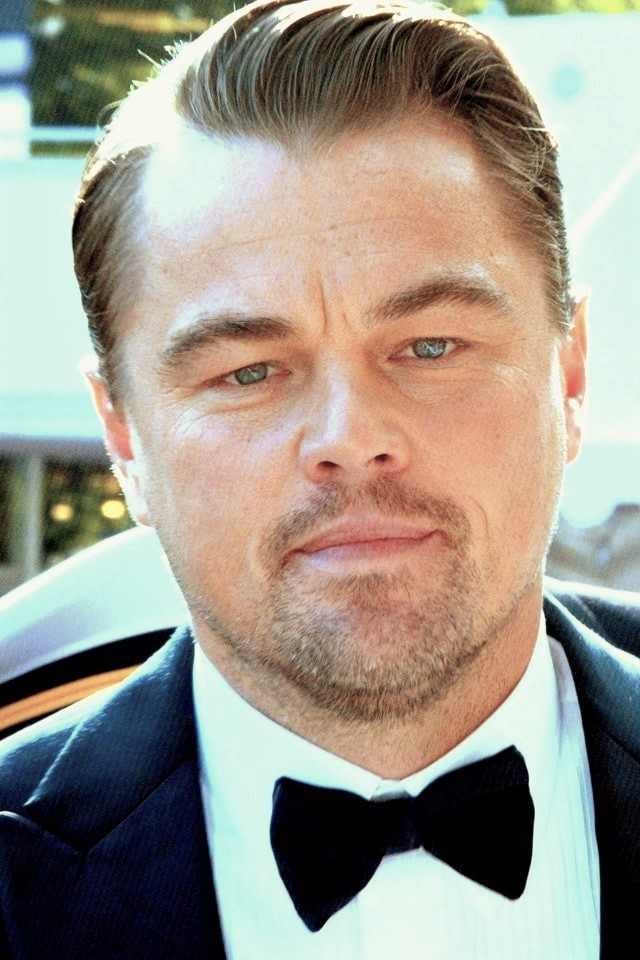
Leonardo DiCaprio, Best Actor winner

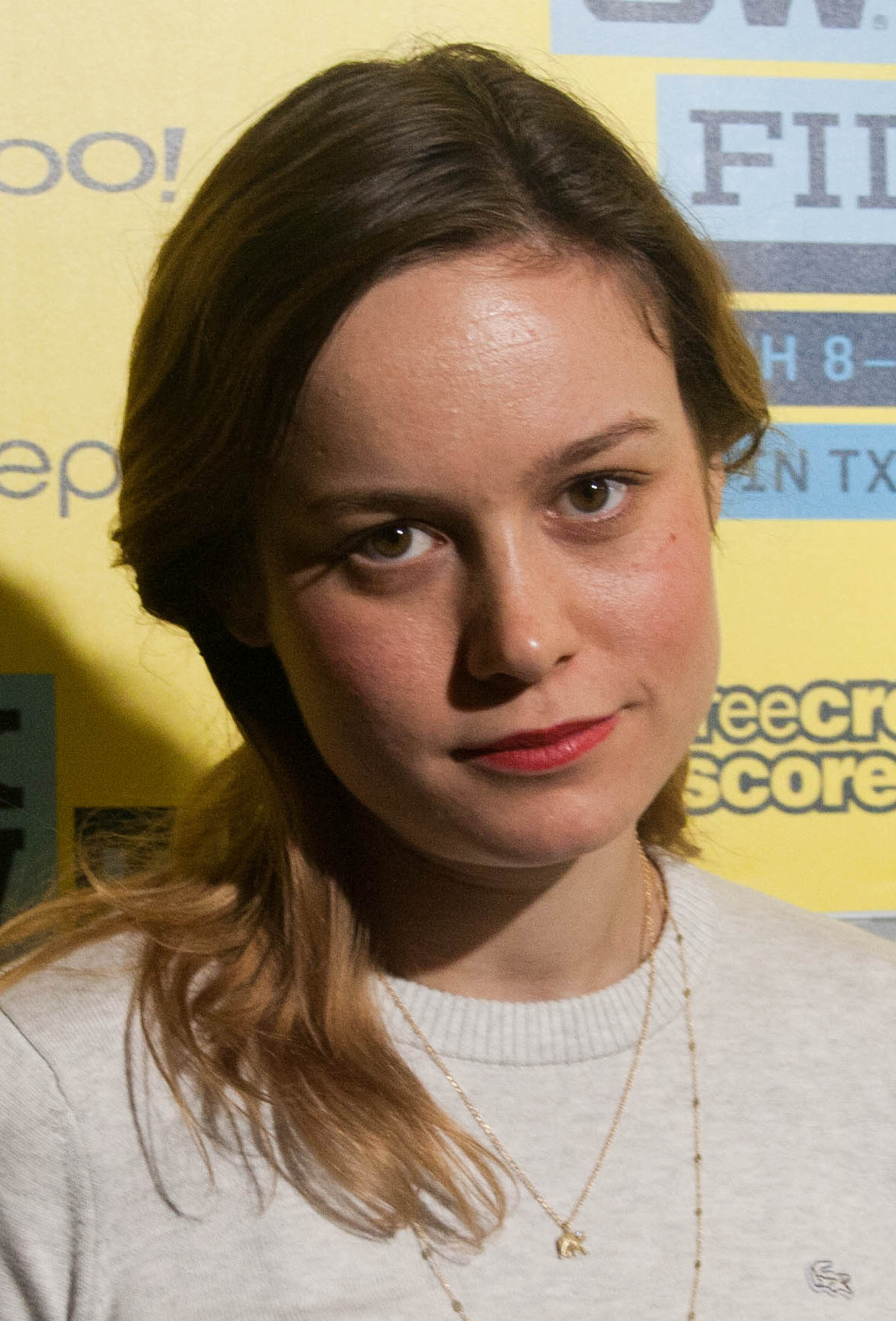
Brie Larson, Best Actress winner

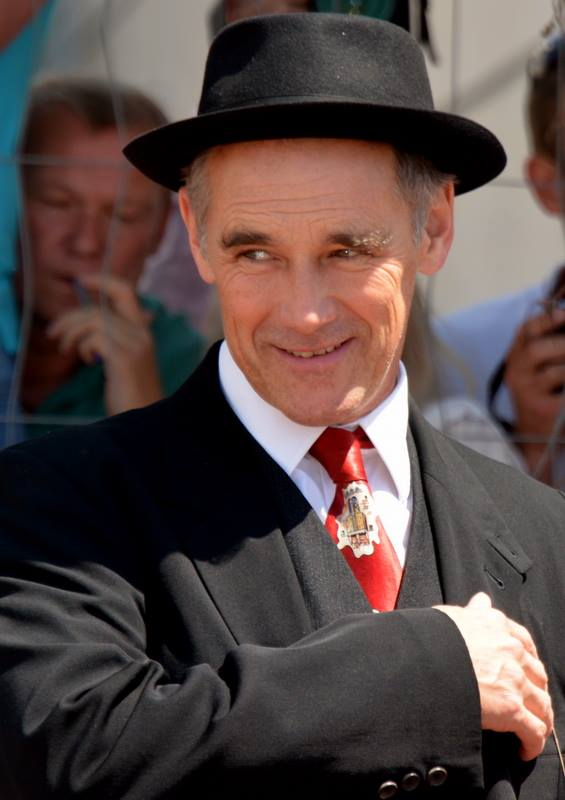
Mark Rylance, Best Supporting Actor winner

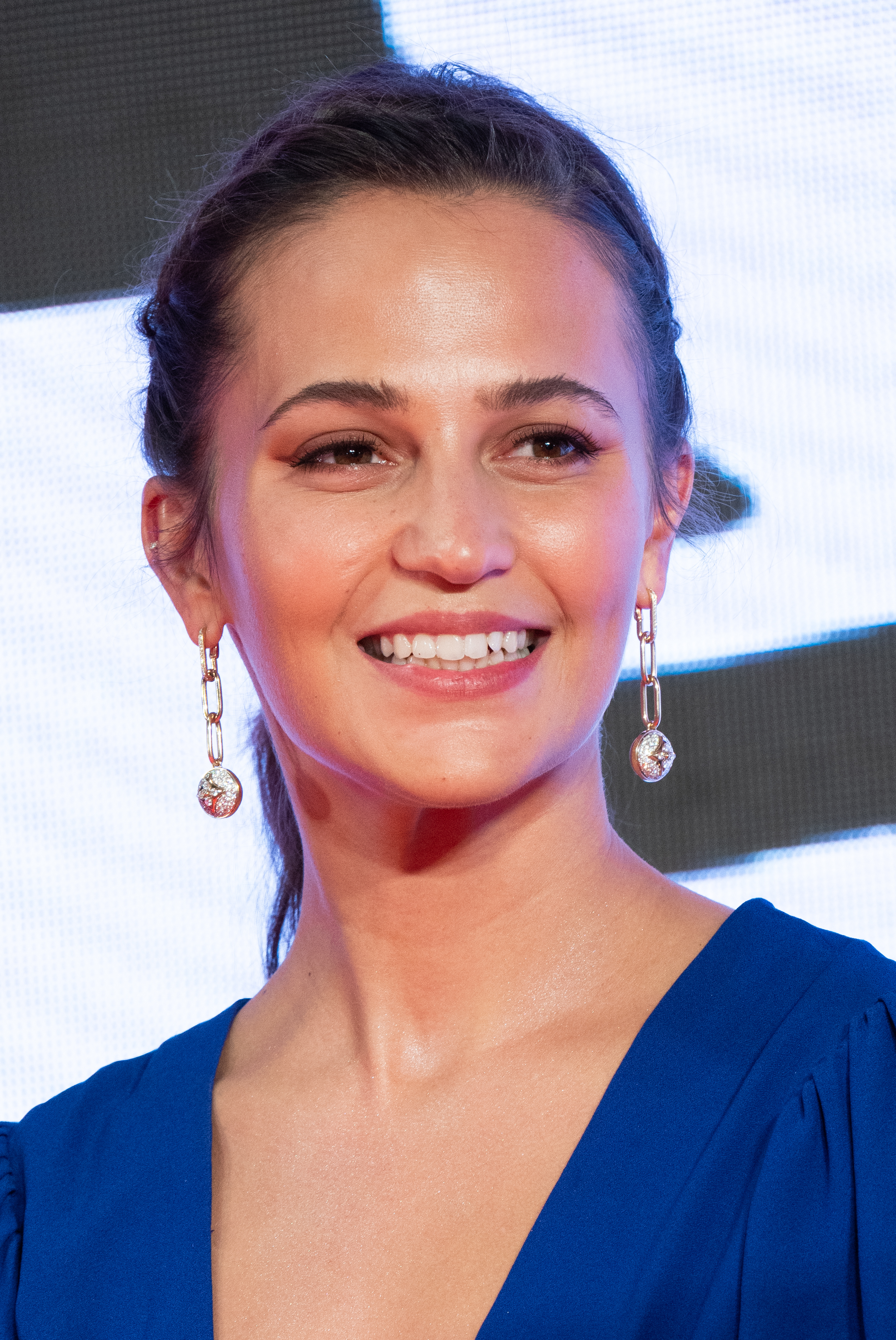
Alicia Vikander, Best Supporting Actress winner

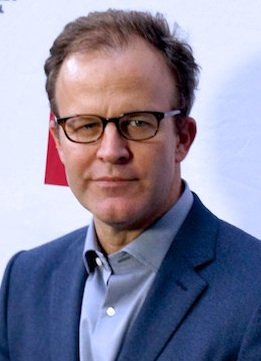
Tom McCarthy, Best Original Screenplay co-winner

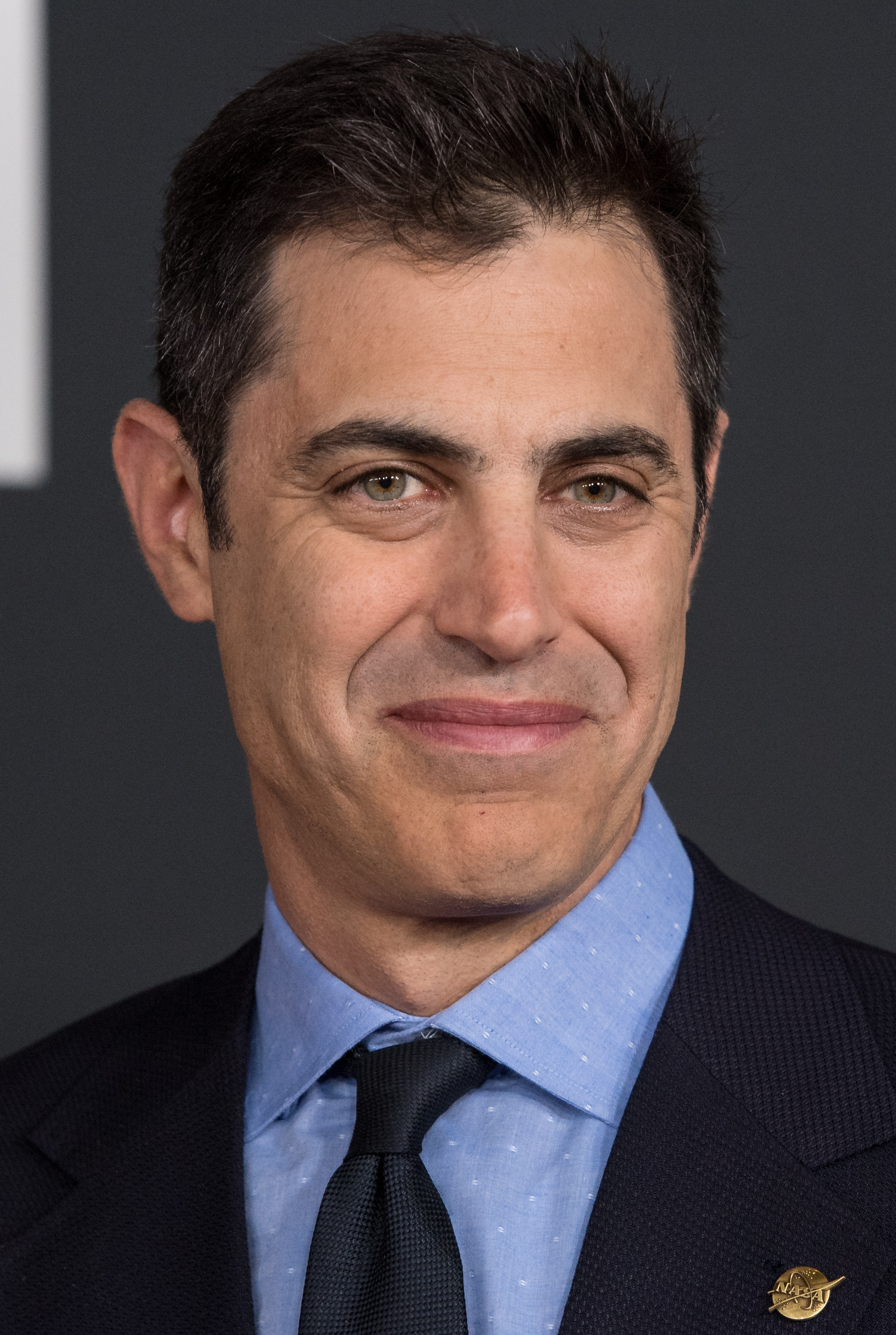
Josh Singer, Best Original Screenplay co-winner

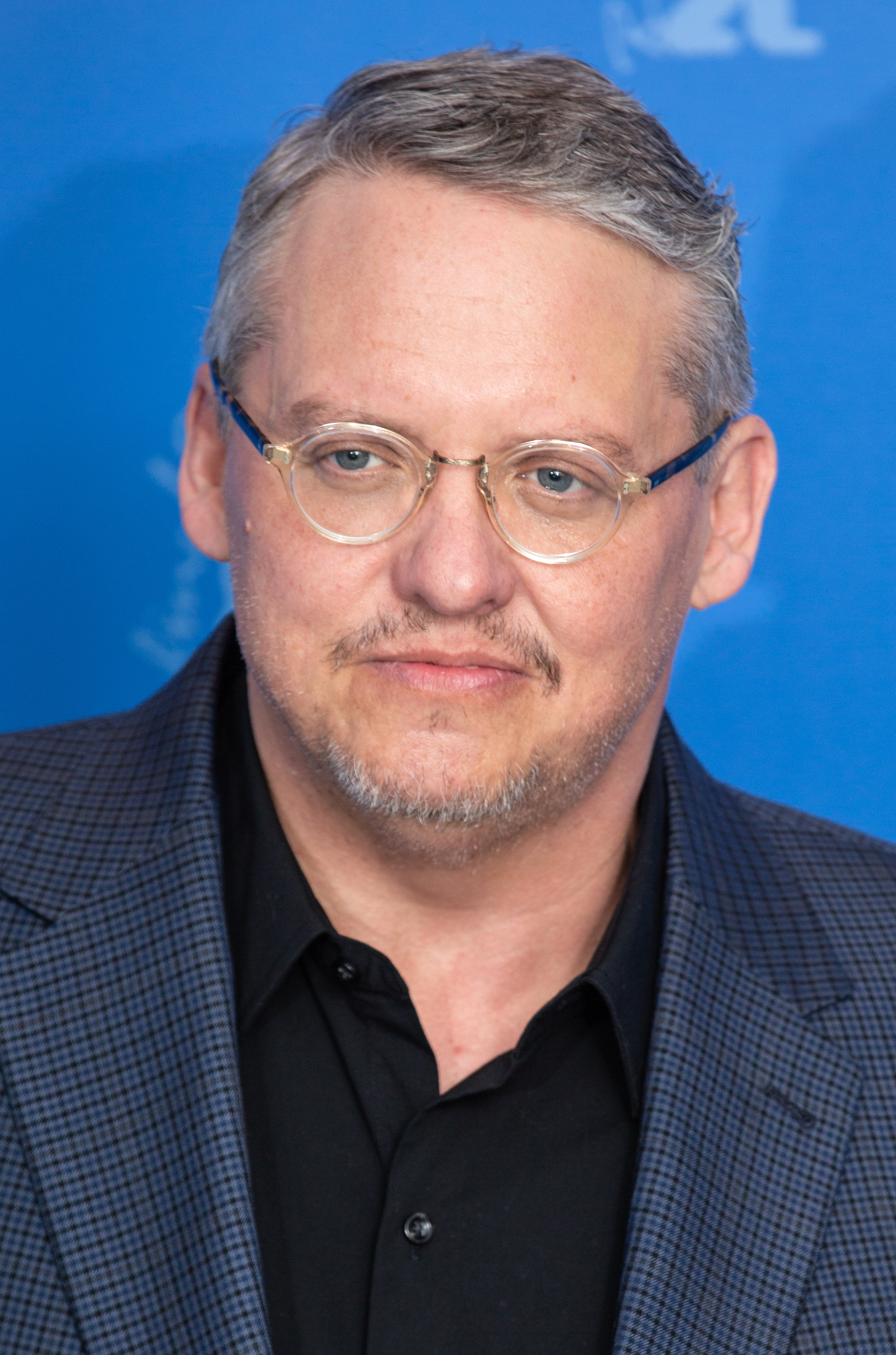
Adam McKay, Best Adapted Screenplay co-winner

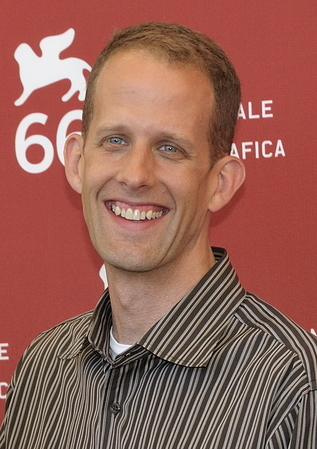
Pete Docter, Best Animated Feature Film co-winner

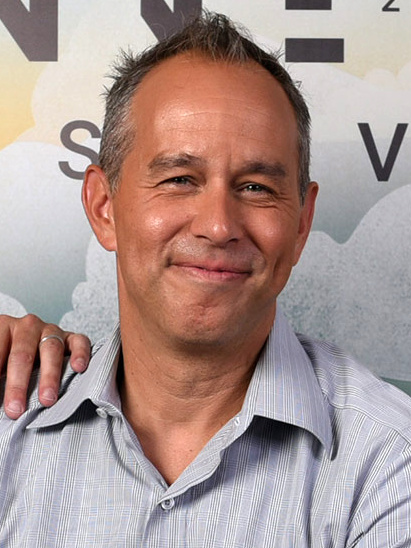
Jonas Rivera, Best Animated Feature Film co-winner

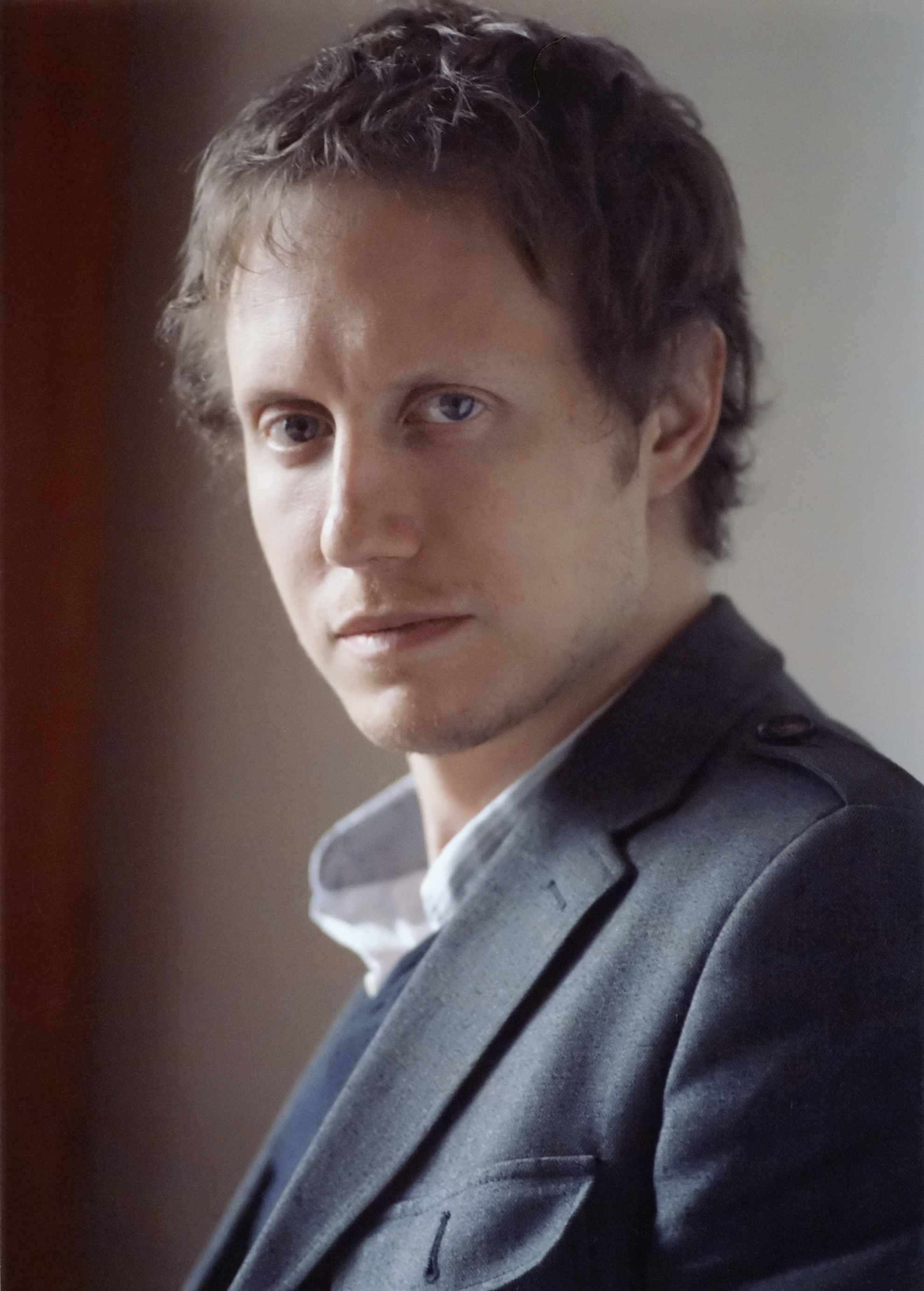
László Nemes, Best Foreign Language Film winner

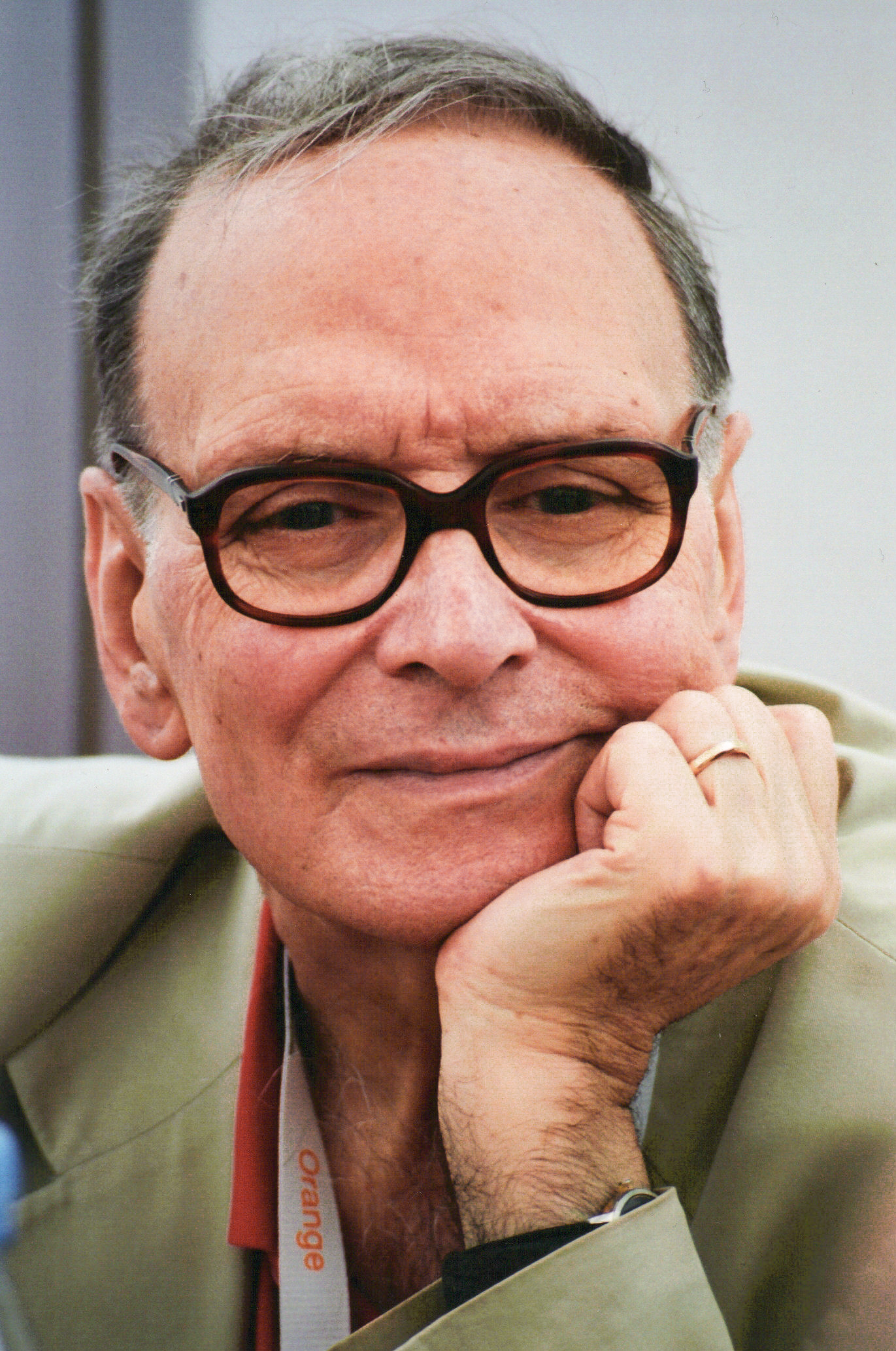
Ennio Morricone, Best Original Score winner

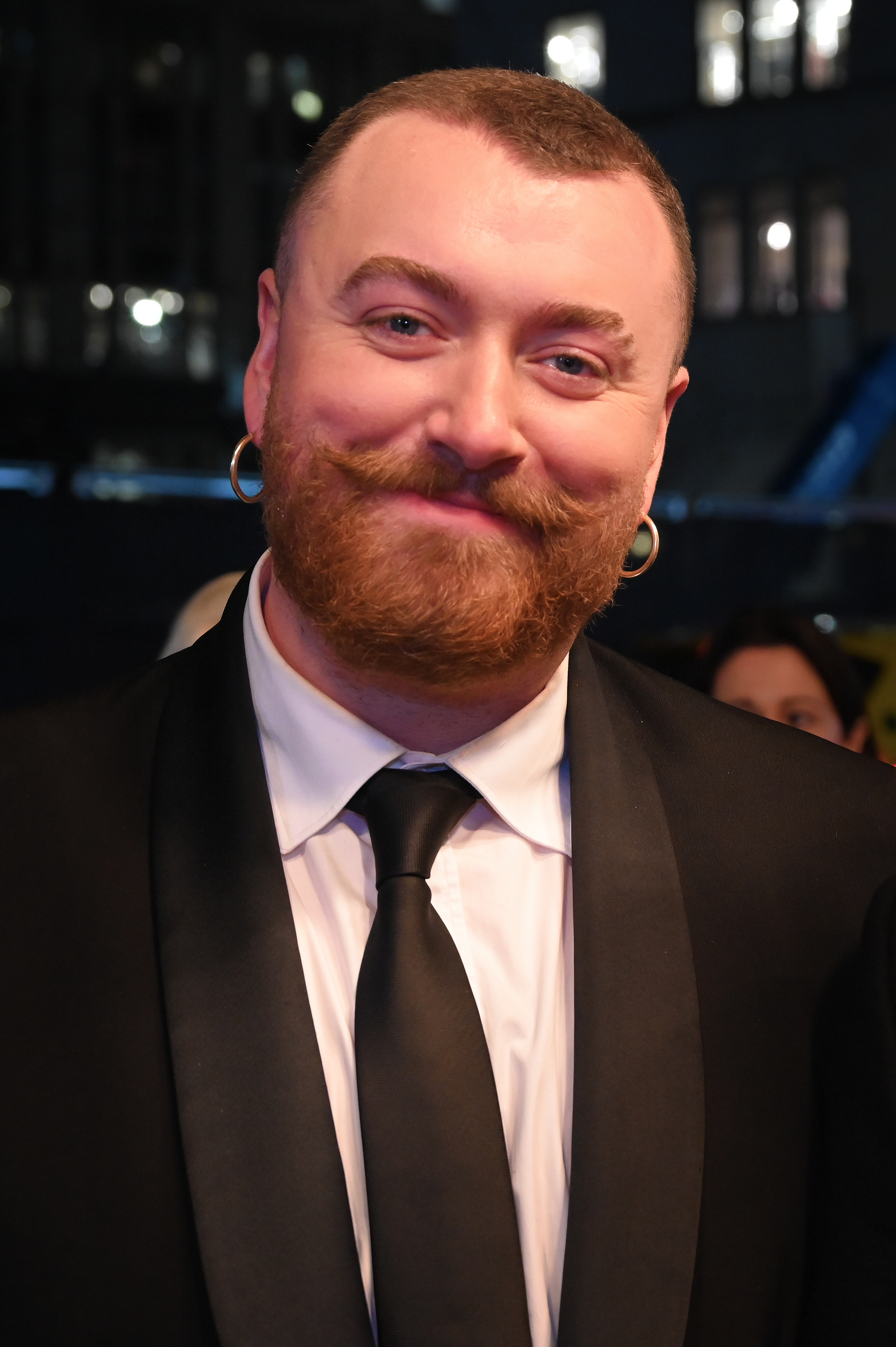
Sam Smith, Best Original Song co-winner

**Best Picture**: **Spotlight – Michael Sugar, Steve Golin, Nicole Rocklin and Blye Pagon Faust, producers‡**; The Big Short – Brad Pitt, Dede Gardner and Jeremy Kleiner, producers; Bridge of Spies – Steven Spielberg, Marc Platt and Kristie Macosko Krieger, producers; Brooklyn – Finola Dwyer and Amanda Posey, producers; Mad Max: Fury Road – Doug Mitchell and George Miller, producers; The Martian – Simon Kinberg, Ridley Scott, Michael Schaefer and Mark Huffam, producers; The Revenant – Arnon Milchan, Steve Golin, Alejandro G. Iñárritu, Mary Parent and Keith Redmon, producers; Room – Ed Guiney, producer	**Best Directing**: **Alejandro G. Iñárritu – The Revenant‡**; Adam McKay – The Big Short; George Miller – Mad Max: Fury Road; Lenny Abrahamson – Room; Tom McCarthy – Spotlight
**Best Actor in a Leading Role**: **Leonardo DiCaprio – The Revenant as Hugh Glass‡**; Bryan Cranston – Trumbo as Dalton Trumbo; Matt Damon – The Martian as Mark Watney; Michael Fassbender – Steve Jobs as Steve Jobs; Eddie Redmayne – The Danish Girl as Lili Elbe	**Best Actress in a Leading Role**: **Brie Larson – Room as Joy "Ma" Newsome‡**; Cate Blanchett – Carol as Carol Aird; Jennifer Lawrence – Joy as Joy Mangano; Charlotte Rampling – 45 Years as Kate Mercer; Saoirse Ronan – Brooklyn as Eilis Lacey
**Best Actor in a Supporting Role**: **Mark Rylance – Bridge of Spies as Rudolf Abel‡**; Christian Bale – The Big Short as Michael Burry; Tom Hardy – The Revenant as John Fitzgerald; Mark Ruffalo – Spotlight as Michael Rezendes; Sylvester Stallone – Creed as Rocky Balboa	**Best Actress in a Supporting Role**: **Alicia Vikander – The Danish Girl as Gerda Wegener‡**; Jennifer Jason Leigh – The Hateful Eight as Daisy Domergue; Rooney Mara – Carol as Therese Belivet; Rachel McAdams – Spotlight as Sacha Pfeiffer; Kate Winslet – Steve Jobs as Joanna Hoffman
**Best Writing (Original Screenplay)**: **Spotlight – Josh Singer and Tom McCarthy‡**; Bridge of Spies – Matt Charman, Ethan Coen & Joel Coen; Ex Machina – Alex Garland; Inside Out – Pete Docter, Meg LeFauve and Josh Cooley; Original story by Pete Docter and Ronnie del Carmen; Straight Outta Compton – Jonathan Herman and Andrea Berloff; Story by S. Leigh Savidge, Alan Wenkus and Andrea Berloff	**Best Writing (Adapted Screenplay)**: **The Big Short – Charles Randolph and Adam McKay; based on the book by Michael Lewis**‡; Brooklyn – Nick Hornby; based on the novel by Colm Tóibín; Carol – Phyllis Nagy; based on the novel The Price of Salt by Patricia Highsmith; The Martian – Drew Goddard; based on the novel by Andy Weir; Room – Emma Donoghue; based on her novel
**Best Animated Feature Film**: **Inside Out – Pete Docter and Jonas Rivera‡**; Anomalisa – Charlie Kaufman, Duke Johnson and Rosa Tran; Boy and the World – Alê Abreu; Shaun the Sheep Movie – Mark Burton and Richard Starzak; When Marnie Was There – Hiromasa Yonebayashi and Yoshiaki Nishimura	**Best Foreign Language Film**: **Son of Saul (Hungary) in Hungarian – Directed by László Nemes‡**; Embrace of the Serpent (Colombia) in Spanish – Directed by Ciro Guerra; Mustang (France) in Turkish – Directed by Deniz Gamze Ergüven; Theeb (Jordan) in Arabic – Directed by Naji Abu Nowar; A War (Denmark) in Danish – Directed by Tobias Lindholm
**Best Documentary (Feature)**: **Amy – Asif Kapadia and James Gay-Rees‡**; Cartel Land – Matthew Heineman and Tom Yellin; The Look of Silence – Joshua Oppenheimer and Signe Byrge Sørensen; What Happened, Miss Simone? – Liz Garbus, Amy Hobby and Justin Wilkes; Winter on Fire: Ukraine's Fight for Freedom – Evgeny Afineevsky and Den Tolmor	**Best Documentary (Short Subject)**: **A Girl in the River: The Price of Forgiveness – Sharmeen Obaid-Chinoy‡**; Body Team 12 – David Darg and Bryn Mooser; Chau, Beyond the Lines – Courtney Marsh and Jerry Franck; Claude Lanzmann: Spectres of the Shoah – Adam Benzine; Last Day of Freedom – Dee Hibbert-Jones and Nomi Talisman
**Best Short Film (Live Action)**: **Stutterer – Benjamin Cleary and Serena Armitage‡**; Ave Maria – Basil Khalil and Eric Dupont; Day One – Henry Hughes; Everything Will Be Okay – Patrick Vollrath; Shok – Jamie Donoughue	**Best Short Film (Animated)**: **Bear Story – Gabriel Osorio and Pato Escala‡**; Prologue – Richard Williams and Imogen Sutton; Sanjay's Super Team – Sanjay Patel and Nicole Grindle; We Can't Live Without Cosmos – Konstantin Bronzit; World of Tomorrow – Don Hertzfeldt
**Best Music (Original Score)**: **The Hateful Eight – Ennio Morricone‡**; Bridge of Spies – Thomas Newman; Carol – Carter Burwell; Sicario – Jóhann Jóhannsson; Star Wars: The Force Awakens – John Williams	**Best Music (Original Song)**: **"Writing's on the Wall" from Spectre – Music and Lyric by Jimmy Napes and Sam Smith‡**; "Earned It" from Fifty Shades of Grey – Music and Lyric by The Weeknd, Ahmad Balshe, Jason Quenneville and Stephan Moccio; "Manta Ray" from Racing Extinction – Music by J. Ralph; Lyric by Anohni; "Simple Song #3" from Youth – Music and Lyric by David Lang; "Til It Happens to You" from The Hunting Ground – Music and Lyric by Lady Gaga and Diane Warren
**Best Sound Editing**: **Mad Max: Fury Road – Mark Mangini and David White‡**; The Martian – Oliver Tarney; The Revenant – Martin Hernández and Lon Bender; Sicario – Alan Robert Murray; Star Wars: The Force Awakens – Matthew Wood and David Acord	**Best Sound Mixing**: **Mad Max: Fury Road – Chris Jenkins, Gregg Rudloff and Ben Osmo‡**; Bridge of Spies – Andy Nelson, Gary Rydstrom and Drew Kunin; The Martian – Paul Massey, Mark Taylor and Mac Ruth; The Revenant – Jon Taylor, Frank A. Montaño, Randy Thom and Chris Duesterdiek; Star Wars: The Force Awakens – Andy Nelson, Christopher Scarabosio and Stuart Wilson
**Best Production Design**: **Mad Max: Fury Road – Production Design: Colin Gibson; Set Decoration: Lisa Thompson‡**; Bridge of Spies – Production Design: Adam Stockhausen; Set Decoration: Rena DeAngelo and Bernhard Henrich; The Danish Girl – Production Design: Eve Stewart; Set Decoration: Michael Standish; The Martian – Production Design: Arthur Max; Set Decoration: Celia Bobak; The Revenant – Production Design: Jack Fisk; Set Decoration: Hamish Purdy	**Best Cinematography**: **The Revenant – Emmanuel Lubezki‡**; Carol – Ed Lachman; The Hateful Eight – Robert Richardson; Mad Max: Fury Road – John Seale; Sicario – Roger Deakins
**Best Makeup and Hairstyling**: **Mad Max: Fury Road – Lesley Vanderwalt, Elka Wardega and Damian Martin‡**; The 100-Year-Old Man Who Climbed Out the Window and Disappeared – Love Larson and Eva von Bahr; The Revenant – Siân Grigg, Duncan Jarman and Robert Pandini	**Best Costume Design**: **Mad Max: Fury Road – Jenny Beavan‡**; Carol – Sandy Powell; Cinderella – Sandy Powell; The Danish Girl – Paco Delgado; The Revenant – Jacqueline West
**Best Film Editing**: **Mad Max: Fury Road – Margaret Sixel‡**; The Big Short – Hank Corwin; The Revenant – Stephen Mirrione; Spotlight – Tom McArdle; Star Wars: The Force Awakens – Maryann Brandon and Mary Jo Markey	**Best Visual Effects**: **Ex Machina – Andrew Whitehurst, Paul Norris, Mark Ardington and Sara Bennett‡**; Mad Max: Fury Road – Andrew Jackson, Tom Wood, Dan Oliver and Andy Williams; The Martian – Richard Stammers, Anders Langlands, Chris Lawrence and Steven Warner; The Revenant – Rich McBride, Matthew Shumway, Jason Smith and Cameron Waldbauer; Star Wars: The Force Awakens – Roger Guyett, Patrick Tubach, Neal Scanlan and Chris Corbould

=== Governors Awards ===
The academy held its 7th Annual Governors Awards ceremony on November 14, 2015, during which the following awards were presented:

==== Honorary Awards ====
- To Spike Lee, filmmaker, educator, motivator, iconoclast, artist.
- To Gena Rowlands, who has illuminated the human experience through her brilliant, passionate and fearless performances.

==== Jean Hersholt Humanitarian Award ====
- Debbie Reynolds — For her charitable contributions and tireless efforts towards mental health as founding member of The Thalians.

=== Films with multiple nominations and awards ===
Films that received multiple nominations
Nominations	Film
12	The Revenant
10	Mad Max: Fury Road
7	The Martian
6	Bridge of Spies
6	Carol
6	Spotlight
5	Star Wars: The Force Awakens
5	The Big Short
4	Room
4	The Danish Girl
3	Brooklyn
3	Sicario
3	The Hateful Eight
2	Ex Machina
2	Inside Out
2	Steve Jobs

Films that received multiple awards
Awards	Film
6	Mad Max: Fury Road
3	The Revenant
2	Spotlight

== Presenters and performers ==
The following individuals, listed in order of appearance, presented awards or performed musical numbers.

=== Presenters ===
Name(s)	Role
Ellen K	Announcer for the 88th annual Academy Awards
Emily Blunt; Charlize Theron	Presenters of the award for Best Original Screenplay
Russell Crowe; Ryan Gosling	Presenters of the award for Best Adapted Screenplay
Sarah Silverman	Introducer of the performance of Best Original Song nominee "Writing's on the Wall"
Henry Cavill; Kerry Washington	Presenters of the films The Martian and The Big Short on the Best Picture segment
J. K. Simmons	Presenter of the award for Best Supporting Actress
Cate Blanchett	Presenter of the award for Best Costume Design
Steve Carell; Tina Fey	Presenters of the award for Best Production Design
Jared Leto; Margot Robbie	Presenters of the award for Best Makeup and Hairstyling
Benicio del Toro; Jennifer Garner	Presenters of the films The Revenant and Mad Max: Fury Road on the Best Picture segment
Michael B. Jordan; Rachel McAdams	Presenters of the award for Best Cinematography
Priyanka Chopra; Liev Schreiber	Presenters of the award for Best Film Editing
Chadwick Boseman; Chris Evans	Presenters of the awards for Best Sound Editing and Best Sound Mixing
Andy Serkis	Presenter of the award for Best Visual Effects
Olivia Munn; Jason Segel	Presenters of the segment of the Academy Awards for Technical Achievement
Kevin, Stuart, and Bob (Voiced by Pierre Coffin)	Presenters of the award for Best Animated Short Film
Sheriff Woody (Tom Hanks); Buzz Lightyear (Tim Allen)	Presenters of the award for Best Animated Feature Film
Kevin Hart	Introducer of the performance of Best Original Song nominee "Earned It"
Kate Winslet; Reese Witherspoon	Presenters of the films Bridge of Spies and Spotlight on the Best Picture segment
Patricia Arquette	Presenter of the award for Best Supporting Actor
Louis C.K.	Presenter of the award for Best Documentary Short Subject
Dev Patel; Daisy Ridley	Presenters of the award for Best Documentary Feature
Whoopi Goldberg	Presenter of the segment of the Honorary Academy Awards and Jean Hersholt Humanitarian Award
Cheryl Boone Isaacs (AMPAS president)	Special presentation highlighting the benefits of film and diversity
Louis Gossett Jr.	Presenter of the In Memoriam tribute
Abraham Attah; Jacob Tremblay	Presenters of the award for Best Live Action Short Film
Lee Byung-hun; Sofía Vergara	Presenters of the award for Best Foreign Language Film
Joe Biden	Introducer of the performance of Best Original Song nominee "Til It Happens to You"
Quincy Jones; Pharrell Williams	Presenters of the award for Best Original Score
Common; John Legend	Presenters of the award for Best Original Song
Sacha Baron Cohen (as Ali G); Olivia Wilde	Presenters of the films Room and Brooklyn on the Best Picture segment
J. J. Abrams	Presenter of the award for Best Director
Eddie Redmayne	Presenter of the award for Best Actress
Julianne Moore	Presenter of the award for Best Actor
Morgan Freeman	Presenter of the award for Best Picture

=== Performers ===
Name(s)	Role	Performed
Harold Wheeler	Musical arranger and conductor	Orchestral
Sam Smith	Performer	"Writing's on the Wall" from Spectre
The Weeknd	Performer	"Earned It" from Fifty Shades of Grey
Dave Grohl	Performer	"Blackbird" during the annual In Memoriam tribute
Lady Gaga	Performer	"Til It Happens to You" from The Hunting Ground

== Ceremony information ==
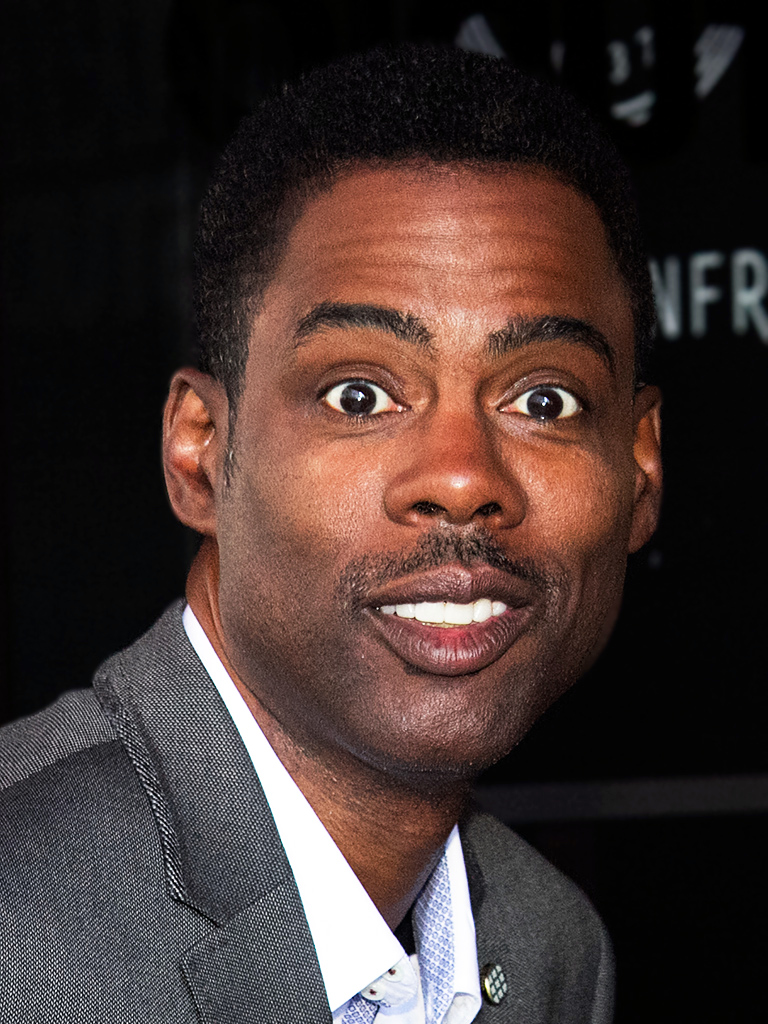
Chris Rock hosted the 88th Academy Awards.

Due to the mixed reception and lower ratings resulting from the previous year's ceremony, producers Neil Meron and Craig Zadan declined to helm the upcoming festivities. Shortly afterwards, actor Neil Patrick Harris announced that he would not host the Oscars for a second time. In an interview released from The Huffington Post, he said "I don't know that my family nor my soul could take it. It's a beast. It was fun to check off the list, but for the amount of time spent and the understandable opinionated response, I don't know that it's a delightful balance to do every year or even again." In September 2015, AMPAS recruited David Hill and Reginald Hudlin as producers of the ceremony. "We're delighted to have this talented team on board," AMPAS president Cheryl Boone Isaacs said in a press release announcing the decision, "David is a true innovator with a dynamic personality. His vast experience as a live events producer, coupled with Reginald's energy, creativity and talent as a filmmaker, is sure to make this year's Oscar telecast a memorable one."

The following month, Hill and Hudlin selected actor and comedian Chris Rock to host the 2016 telecast. They explained their decision to hire Rock back as host saying, "Chris Rock is truly the MVP of the entertainment industry. Comedian, actor, writer, producer, director, documentarian — he's done it all. He's going to be a phenomenal Oscar host!" Rock expressed that he was thrilled to be selected to emcee the gala again, commenting, "I'm so glad to be hosting the Oscars, it's great to be back."

The key art and marketing for the ceremony featured the tagline "We all dream in gold", with print advertising featuring photography of past winners. AMPAS chief marketing officer Christina Kounelias explained that it was meant to reflect the Academy Awards as being both "a symbol of excellence but also this idea of 'If you can dream it, you can achieve it'".

Several other individuals participated in the production of the ceremony. Billy Kimball was the head writer. Radio disc jockey and personality Ellen K served as announcer for the show. Byron Phillips and Harold Wheeler were hired as music producer and music director respectively. For a fourth consecutive year Derek McLane returned to design a new set for the show. Fatima Robinson was in charge of choreography for the broadcast. For the first time, the Oscar statuettes were manufactured by Polich Tallix Fine Art Foundry in Rock Tavern, New York. In a further effort to streamline acceptance speeches, dedications were displayed on an on-screen ticker, rather than read by the winner. Prior to introducing singer Lady Gaga's performance of Best Original Song nominee "Til It Happens to You" from the documentary film The Hunting Ground, U.S. Vice President Joe Biden pleaded with viewers to sign an online pledge supporting "It's On Us" to end campus sexual assault.

On February 19, 2016, Variety reported that due to time constraints only three of five songs nominated for Best Original Song would be performed live during the ceremony. One of two omitted songs was "Manta Ray", performed and co-written by Anohni, the first transgender person to be nominated for an Academy Award for Best Original Song. She boycotted the ceremony, stating: "Everyone told me that I still ought to attend, that a walk down the red carpet would still be 'good for my career'. Last night I tried to force myself to get on the plane to fly to LA for all the nominee events, but the feelings of embarrassment and anger knocked me back, and I couldn't get on the plane." She also added: "I imagined how it would feel for me to sit amongst all those Hollywood stars, some of the brave ones approaching me with sad faces and condolences. There I was, feeling a sting of shame that reminded me of America's earliest affirmations of my inadequacy as a transperson. I turned around at the airport and went back home."

=== Box office performance of nominated films ===
North American box office gross for Best Picture nominees
Film	Pre-nomination (before Jan. 14)	Post-nomination (Jan. 14 – Feb. 28)	Post-awards (after Feb. 28)	Total
The Martian	$226.6 million	$1.8 million	$53,548	$228.4 million
The Revenant	$54.1 million	$116.5 million	$11.9 million	$182.6 million
Mad Max: Fury Road	$153.6 million	--	--	$153.6 million
Bridge of Spies	$70.8 million	$1.4 million	$49,549	$72.3 million
The Big Short	$44.6 million	$23.9 million	$1.7 million	$70.2 million
Spotlight	$28.8 million	$10.3 million	$5.5 million	$44.6 million
Brooklyn	$22.8 million	$13.7 million	$1.6 million	$38.1 million
Room	$5.2 million	$8.2 million	$1.2 million	$14.7 million

At the time of the nominations announcement on January 14, 2016, the combined gross of the eight Best Picture nominees at the American and Canadian box offices was $607 million, with an average of $75.8 million per film. When the nominations were announced on January 14, 2016, The Martian was the highest-grossing film among the Best Picture nominees with $226.6 million in domestic box office receipts. Mad Max: Fury Road was the second-highest-grossing film with $153.6 million; this was followed by Bridge of Spies ($70.7 million), The Revenant ($54.1 million), The Big Short ($44.6 million), Spotlight ($28.8 million), Brooklyn ($22.7 million), and Room ($5.1 million).

Of the top 50 grossing movies of the year, 46 nominations went to 11 films on the list. Only Inside Out (4th), The Martian (8th), Straight Outta Compton (18th), The Revenant (15th), Mad Max: Fury Road (21st), Creed (29th), and Bridge of Spies (42nd) were nominated for Best Picture, Best Animated Feature, or any of the directing, acting, or screenwriting awards. The other top 50 box office hits that earned nominations were Star Wars: The Force Awakens (1st), Cinderella (9th), Spectre (10th), and Fifty Shades of Grey (17th).

=== Criticism regarding lack of diversity ===
Shortly after the nominations were announced, many news media outlets observed that there was a lack of racial diversity amongst the nominees in major categories. For the second consecutive year, all twenty acting nominees and four out of the five directors nominated were Caucasian, despite the Academy president saying the previous year that they would take steps to be more representative of different ethnicities. Activist and former attorney April Reign, who was credited with starting the hashtag #OscarsSoWhite, tweeted, "It's actually worse than last year. Best Documentary and Best Original Screenplay. That's it. #OscarsSoWhite." She also noted that while the Caucasian screenwriters of the film Straight Outta Compton earned nominations, the African American cast of the film was overlooked. As a result, the academy was ridiculed again over social media with the aforementioned hashtag. Moreover, actress Jada Pinkett Smith and director and newly minted Honorary Oscar recipient Spike Lee announced plans to boycott the ceremony and encouraged others to not watch the telecast in protest of the lack of diversity. Actor and model Tyrese Gibson and rapper 50 Cent also pressured Chris Rock to drop out of his Oscar hosting duties.

In response to the criticism, several individuals including AMPAS members voiced their opinions regarding the lack of diversity. Some members defended the academy saying that the nominations are based on performance and merit, not race. Actress Penelope Ann Miller responded to the criticism by stating "I voted for a number of black performers, and I was sorry they weren't nominated. To imply that this is because all of us are racists is extremely offensive. I don't want to be lumped into a category of being a racist because I'm certainly not and because I support and benefit from the talent of black people in this business. It was just an incredibly competitive year." In an interview with a French radio station, Best Actress nominee Charlotte Rampling said efforts to stage a boycott of the Oscars were "racist to whites." Oscar winning producer Gerald R. Molen commented, "There is no racism except for those who create an issue. That is the worst kind. Using such an ugly way of complaining," He also denounced members criticizing the academy's choices as "spoiled brats."

Others agreed that the academy had a diversity problem and supported efforts towards change. Best Supporting Actress winner Lupita Nyong'o wrote, "I am disappointed by the lack of inclusion in this year's Academy Awards nominations. It has me thinking about unconscious prejudice and what merits prestige in our culture." She concluded by saying, "I stand with my peers who are calling for change in expanding the stories that are told and recognition of the people who tell them." In a Facebook post, Best Actress winner Reese Witherspoon expressed her frustration with the lack of diversity among the nominees and added, "Nothing can diminish the quality of their work, but these filmmakers deserve recognition. As an Academy member, I would love to see a more diverse voting membership." During an interview with a reporter, President Barack Obama commented on the controversy saying, "I think when everybody's story is told, then that makes for better art. That makes for better entertainment. It makes everybody feel part of one American family. So I think, as a whole, the industry should do what every other industry should do, which is to look for talent, provide opportunity to everybody."

A week after the nominations announcement, the academy announced several rules changes regarding membership in hopes of increasing the number of women and non-white members in the membership by 2020. Beginning in 2016, new members would earn Oscar voting privileges for the next ten years. After that time period, those members may retain voting privileges for another ten years if they have remained active in the motion picture industry. Members would earn lifetime voting privileges if they have served three consecutive ten-year voting eligibility terms or have earned or won an Academy Award. Issacs justified the academy's decision to overhaul the membership requirements saying, "The Academy is going to lead and not wait for the industry to catch up; these new measures regarding governance and voting will have an immediate impact and begin the process of significantly changing our membership composition." Furthermore, the academy would establish three new governor seats that will be nominated by Isaacs and confirmed by the Board. However, the academy's actions also include taking away the membership rights of academy members who have not recently worked in the industry, such as actor Bill Mumy and award-winning screenwriter Patricia Resnick. "Replacing sexism and racism with ageism is not the answer," Resnick said.

On the morning of the Oscars, the National Action Network led by civil rights activist Al Sharpton held a protest a few blocks from the Dolby Theatre regarding the Oscar's diversity problems. "You are out of time," Sharpton said in a rebuke to the academy. "We are not going to allow the Oscars to continue. This will be the last night of an all-white Oscars." In addition, African-American filmmakers Ryan Coogler and Ava DuVernay held a charity event addressing the water crisis in Flint, Michigan, called #JusticeForFlint, on the same night as the Oscars. Despite organizers insisting that the event was being held almost simultaneously with the Oscars, many viewed it as an alternative to watching the ceremony.

=== Carol omissions ===
The omission of Carol from Best Picture and Best Director categories prompted speculation from journalists about the perceived indifference of the Academy of Motion Picture Arts and Sciences toward female- and LGBT-centered films. Nate Scott of USA Today called it "the standout snub" of the ceremony, "one made all the more ridiculous because of the bloated Best Picture field". Nico Lang of The A.V. Club said that despite the film having been considered a "lock" for a Best Picture nomination, the omission "shouldn't have been a major shock" given the controversy over Brokeback Mountain's loss a decade earlier. Jason Bailey of Flavorwire said that most Best Picture nominees that include gay themes "put them firmly in the realm of subplots". "Carol's most transgressive quality", he declared, "is its refusal to engage in such shenanigans; this is a film about full-blooded gay lives, not tragic gay deaths."

At HitFix, Louis Virtel suggested that Academy members' reception of the film was hurt by its focus on self-determined women. Matthew Jacobs of The Huffington Post expressed similar sentiments and felt that the academy's artistic tastes were "too conventional to recognize its brilliance". Richard Lawson of Vanity Fair said that although its "themes of passion and heartache may be universal" the film may be "too gay", speaking "in a vernacular that, I'd guess, only queer people are fully fluent in." He added that the lack of "gushing melodrama" put the film at a disadvantage. Dorothy Snarker of IndieWire attributed the omissions to the academy's demographics. Snarker agreed that Carol may be too gay and too female "for the largely old white male voting base" to connect with. She also considered that the successes of the LGBT rights movement in the U.S. may have partly been responsible for the lack of "political urgency" around the film.

At The Advocate, Rebekah Allen argued that "there are those who simply do not want to see a lesbian love story on screen." Trish Bendix of AfterEllen said that the Best Picture snub was a "reminder of the patriarchal society we continue to live in, where films that create a space for women to live happily without men and without punishment will not be rewarded." Marcie Bianco of Quartz described the film as "centered around women's desire" and structured in a way that "elevates the power of women's gaze". The omission from Best Picture, she concluded, illustrates "yet again how sexism operates in the world, and in the Academy specifically, as the refusal to see women as protagonists and agents of desire." In Paper magazine, Carey O'Donnell observed that gay romances are only "Oscar surefires" when they use the tragedy-desolation-demise "equation", and that "a depiction of two strong women in love with each other ... seems to still be troubling to many". David Ehrlich of Rolling Stone wrote that the film's "patience and precision" did not conform to Academy tastes, but its legacy "will doubtlessly survive this year's most egregious snub". Todd Haynes said that he thought having two female leads was "a factor" in the omission.

=== Asian accountants joke ===
During the show, Rock introduced onstage three children of Asian heritage posing as accountants for PricewaterhouseCoopers, saying: "They sent us their most dedicated, accurate, and hard-working representatives... Please welcome Ming Zhu, Bao Ling and David Moskowitz." He also added, "If anybody's upset about that joke, just tweet about it on your phone that was also made by these kids." In response to the segment, U.S. Congresswoman Judy Chu expressed her disappointment at Rock, broadcaster ABC, and AMPAS in a press release that read, "It is not right to protest the exclusion of one group by making jokes at the expense of another. I am so disappointed that the Academy and ABC would rely on such offensive characterizations, especially given the controversy over the lack of diversity." Actress Constance Wu tweeted, "To parade little kids on stage [with] no speaking lines merely to be the butt of a racist joke is reductive & gross." Furthermore, 25 AMPAS members of Asian descent, including actors Nancy Kwan, Sandra Oh, and George Takei, and director Ang Lee, signed a letter condemning Rock's skit, saying: "In light of criticism over #OscarsSoWhite, we were hopeful that the telecast would provide the Academy a way forward and the chance to present a spectacular example of inclusion and diversity. Instead, the Oscars show was marred by a tone-deaf approach to its portrayal of Asians."

In a phone interview with the Associated Press, Academy President Isaacs apologized for the joke, stating, "I can understand the feelings, and we are setting up a meeting to discuss, because, as you well know, no one sets out to be offensive, and I'm very sorry that has happened. I think so much is achieved with dialogue, so much is achieved. And that is what we'll continue to do: have dialogue, listen, and just keep fixing."

=== Critical reception and television ratings ===
The show received a mixed reception from media publications. A few media outlets reviewed the broadcast more positively with some praise for Rock. Television critic Mary McNamara of the Los Angeles Times remarked: "Rock's Oscars had some of the most powerful moments seen in the telecast's history." She concluded that, "After years of being dissed for its irrelevance, this year's Oscars took action. The results were mixed, to be sure, and Rock did not ever settle into his usual balance of outrage and humanity." The New York Times columnist James Poniewozik commented, "With Chris Rock, the Oscars find a lucky pairing of host and subject." In addition, he wrote, "His performance was an example of something the industry is still trying to learn: that you can achieve both inclusion and entertainment by giving the right person just the right opportunity." The Denver Post's Joanne Ostrow wrote, "Chris Rock poked the elephant in the room at the 2016 Academy Awards, prodded it again and again, and never let up."

Others were more critical of the show. The Hollywood Reporter columnist Daniel Feinberg remarked, "Chris Rock led a telecast that had important things to say, but still felt endless." In addition, Feinberg called the ceremony "overstuffed" and the on-screen running scroll a "total failure". Frazier Moore of the Associated Press quipped, "When Rock was absent, languor prevailed." He added, "One other beef: The attempt to banish the names of those thanked by winners to a text crawl at the bottom of the screen. If viewers wanted to watch a channel with annoying and distracting text at the bottom of the screen, they'd just tune to a cable-news channel." Orlando Sentinel television critic Hal Boedeker gave high marks toward Rock but commented, "No host, no matter how gifted, can transform the lumbering format into a scintillating event." He ended his comments by stating, "Staging a more entertaining Oscar telecast. Why must the show be a slog?"

The American telecast on ABC drew 34.425 million people over its length, which was a 4% decrease from the previous year's ceremony. An estimated 58 million total viewers watched all or part of the awards. The telecast also garnered lower Nielsen ratings compared to the previous ceremony with a 23.4 household rating. In addition, the program scored lower in the 18-49 demo rating with a 10.5 rating over a 31% share. It was the lowest viewership for an Academy Awards telecast since the 80th ceremony, held in 2008.

In July 2016, the ceremony presentation received five nominations for the 68th Primetime Emmys. The following month, the ceremony did not win any of the nominations.

== In Memoriam ==
The annual In Memoriam tribute was presented by actor Louis Gossett Jr. Singer Dave Grohl performed The Beatles' song "Blackbird" during the tribute.

- Wes Craven – Director
- Stan Freberg – Voice actor
- Saeed Jaffrey – Actor
- Miroslav Ondricek – Cinematographer
- Robert Balser – Animation director
- Lizabeth Scott – Actress
- Stuart Reiss – Set decorator
- Chantal Akerman – Director, writer
- Christopher Lee – Actor
- Robert Chartoff – Producer
- Murray Weissman – Publicist
- Jerry Weintraub – Producer
- James L. White – Writer
- Theodore Bikel – Actor
- Robert Loggia – Actor
- Barbara Brogliatti – Public relations executive
- Maureen O'Hara – Actress
- Gene Allen – Production designer, Academy president 1983–1985
- Omar Sharif – Actor
- Louis DiGiaimo – Casting director
- Patricia Norris – Costume designer
- Dean Jones – Actor
- Ettore Scola – Director, writer
- Alan Rickman – Actor
- Haskell Wexler – Cinematographer
- Karolyn Ali – Producer
- Tex Rudloff – Sound mixer
- Richard Corliss – Film critic
- John B. Mansbridge – Art director
- Alex Rocco – Actor
- Kirk Kerkorian – Executive
- Bob Minkler – Sound mixer
- Douglas Slocombe – Cinematographer
- David W. Samuelson – Cameraman, inventor
- James Horner – Composer
- Bruce Sinofsky – Documentarian
- Frank D. Gilroy – Writer
- Holly Woodlawn – Actress
- James Elmo Williams – Film editor, producer, executive
- Howard A. Anderson – Visual effects
- Roger L. Mayer – Executive, film preservation advocate
- Albert Maysles – Documentarian
- Melissa Mathison – Writer
- Richard Glatzer – Director, writer
- David Bowie – Musician, actor
- Vilmos Zsigmond – Cinematographer
- Daniel Gerson – Writer, voice actor
- Leonard Nimoy – Actor

== See also ==
- 22nd Screen Actors Guild Awards
- 36th Golden Raspberry Awards
- 58th Grammy Awards
- 68th Primetime Emmy Awards
- 69th British Academy Film Awards
- 70th Tony Awards
- 73rd Golden Globe Awards
- List of submissions to the 88th Academy Awards for Best Foreign Language Film
