= List of Academy Award winners and nominees from Australia =

List of Australian Academy Award winners and nominees
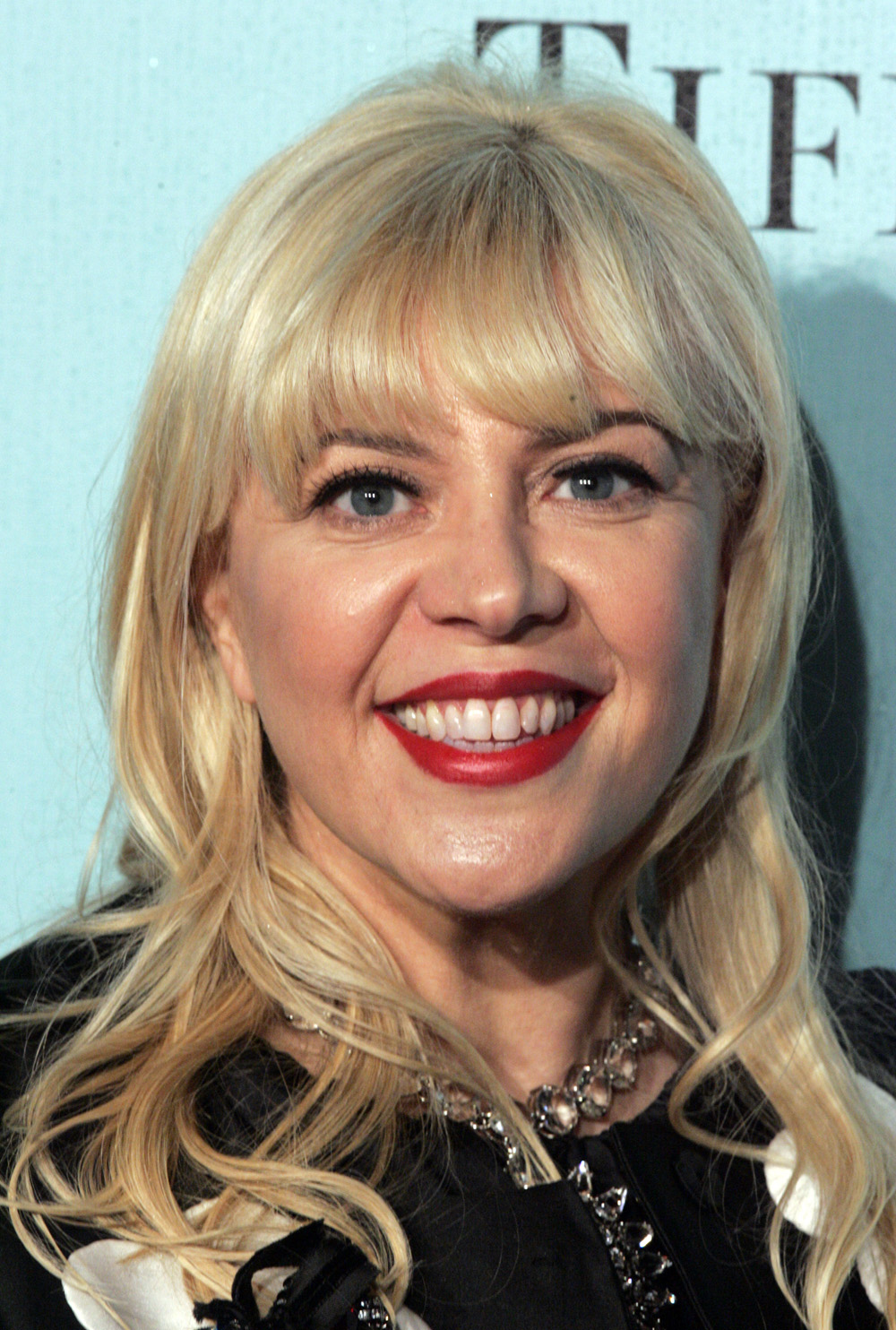
- Catherine Martin has won four Academy Awards, more than any other Australian. She has received nine nominations in the Best Picture, Best Costume Design, and Best Production Design categories.
Awards and nominations
Award	Wins	Nominations

Totals (Note: Certain award groups do not simply award one winner. They acknowledge several different recipients, have runners-up, and have third place. Since this is a specific recognition and is different from losing an award, runner-up mentions are considered wins in this award tally. For simplification and to avoid errors, each award in this list has been presumed to have had a prior nomination.)
- Wins: 59
- Nominations: 192

This list details Australians working in the film industry who have been nominated for, or won, Academy Awards (also known as Oscars). These awards honored outstanding achievements in theatrically released motion pictures and were first presented by the American Academy of Motion Picture Arts and Sciences (AMPAS) in 1929.

As of 2016, a total of 55 awards from 192 nominations had been won by Australians. Additionally, four special awards for scientific and engineering achievements have been given.

== Nominees and winners ==
In the following tables, the years correspond to the year in which the films were released; the Academy Award ceremony is held the following year.

== Production ==
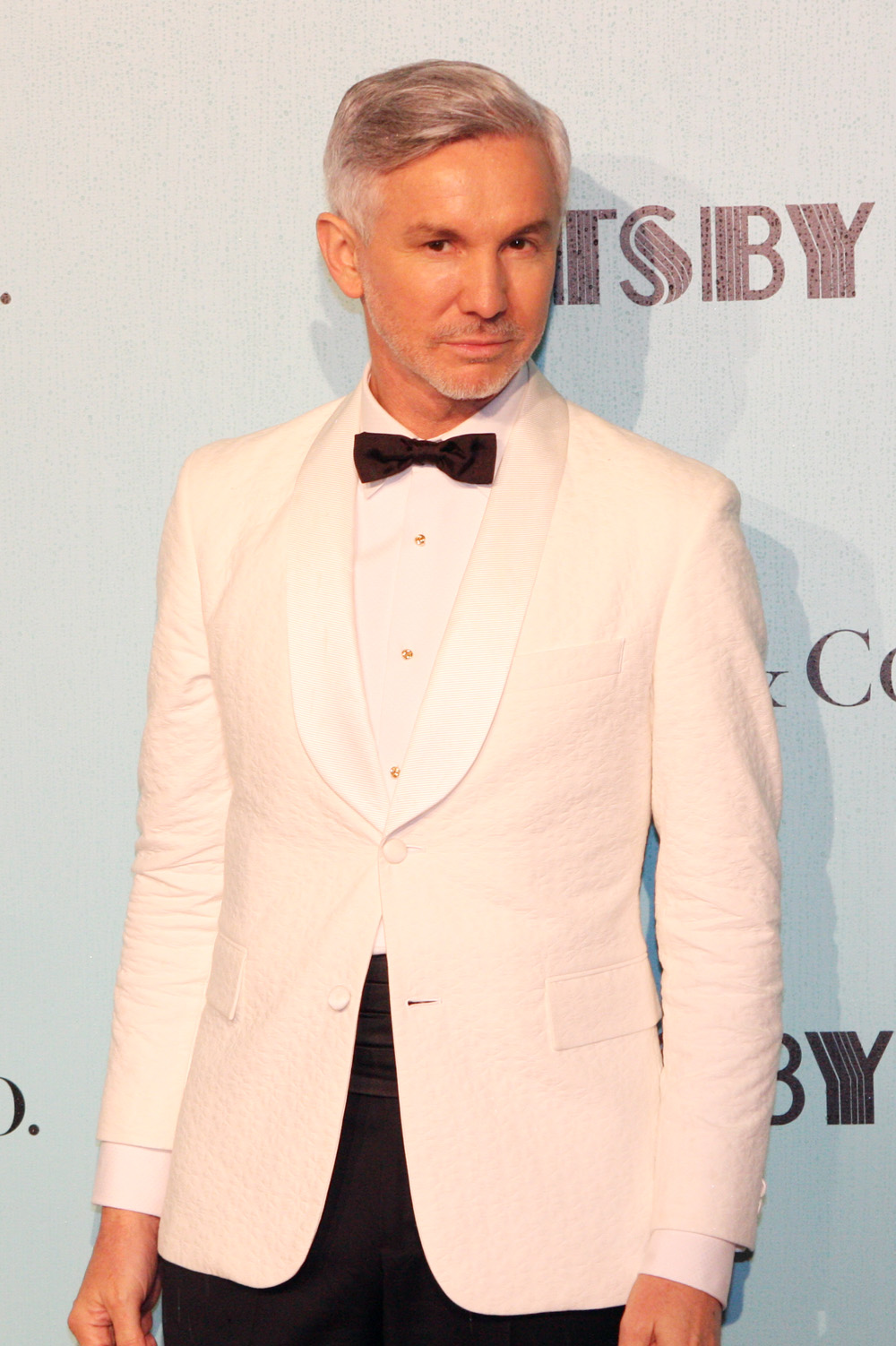
Baz Luhrmann was co-nominated for Best Picture for Moulin Rouge! (2001) and Elvis (2022).

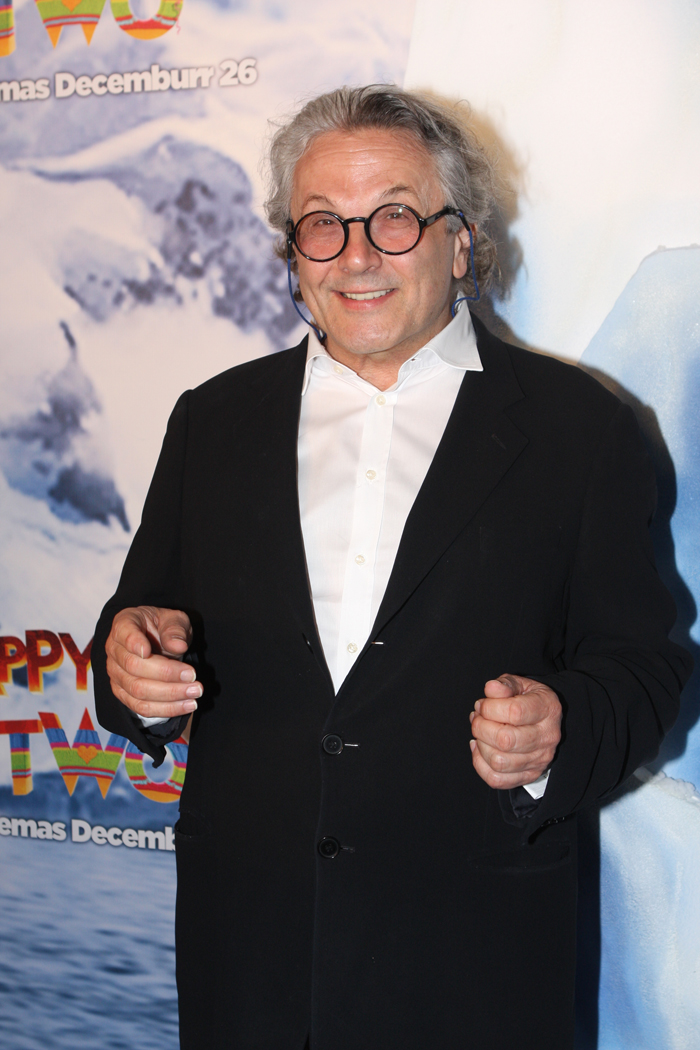
George Miller won for Best Animated Feature for Happy Feet (2006).

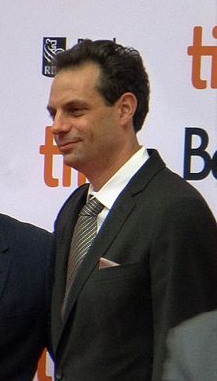
Emile Sherman was co-recipient for Best Picture for The King's Speech (2010).

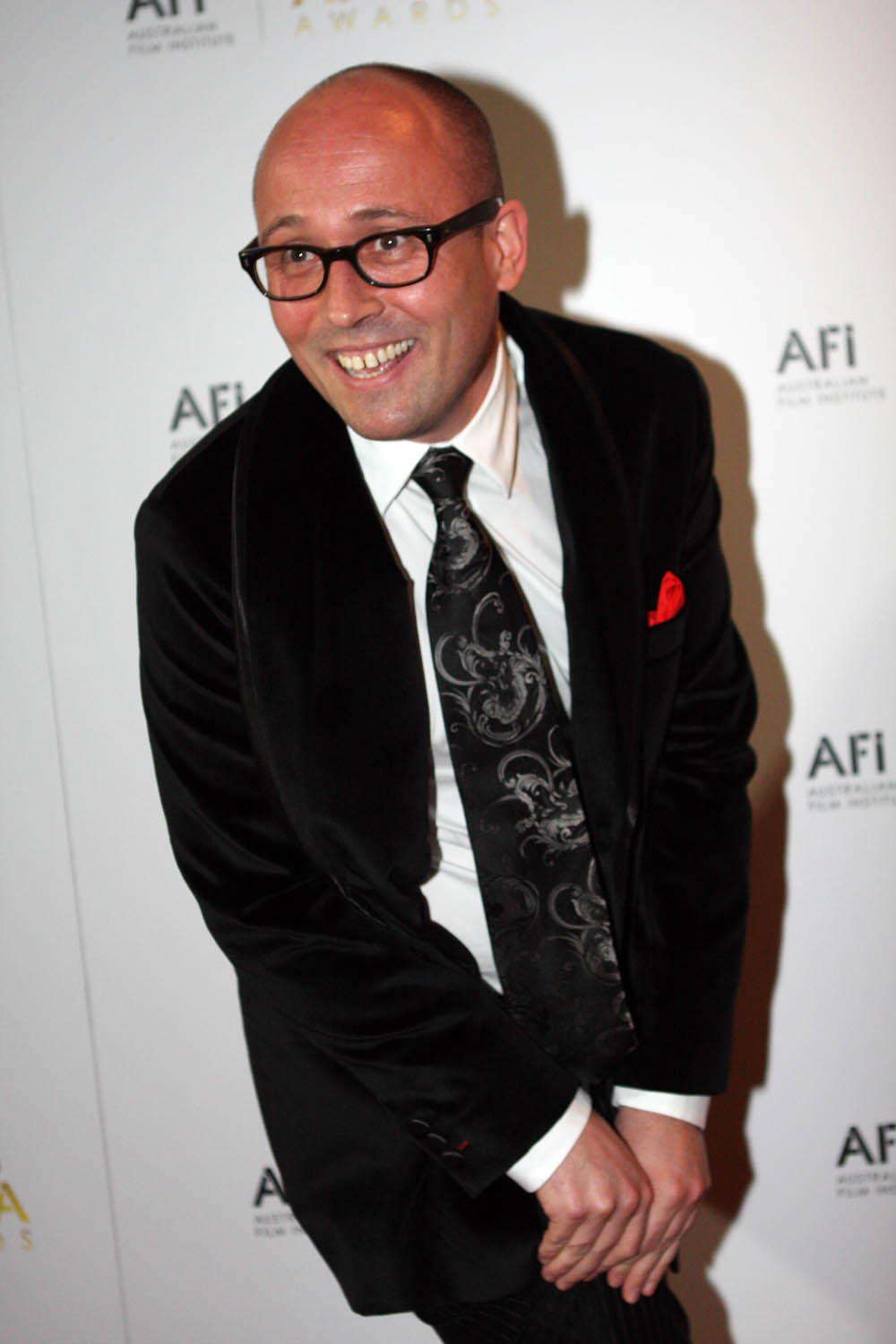
Adam Elliot won Best Animated Short Film for Harvie Krumpet (2003).

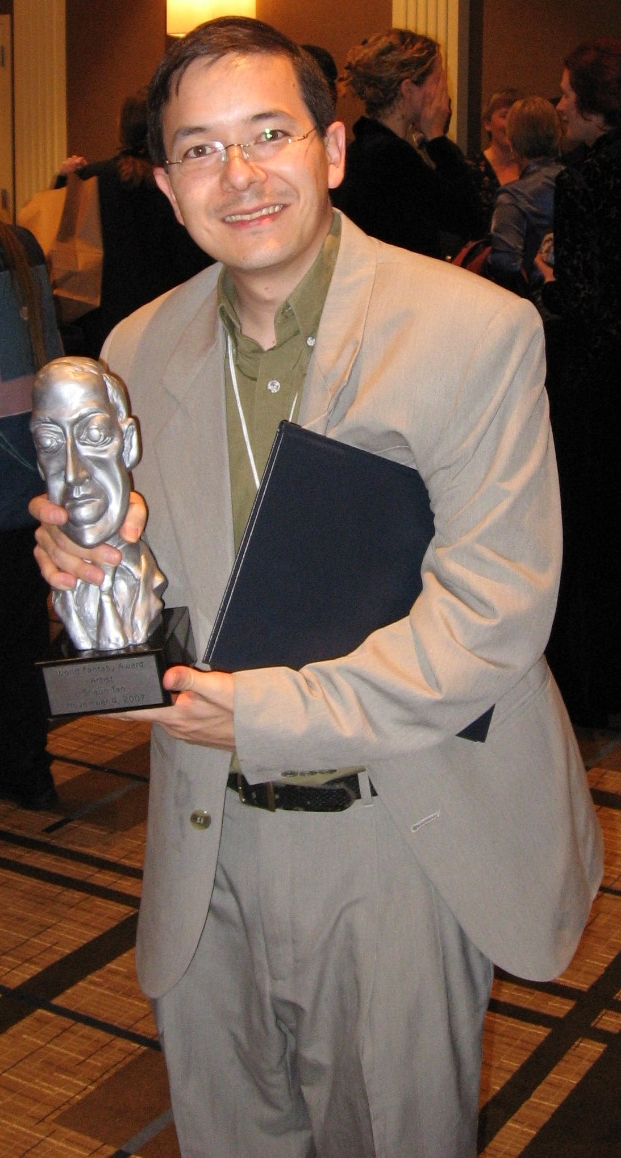
Shaun Tan was co-recipient for Best Animated Short Film for The Lost Thing (2010).

=== Best Picture ===
Academy Award for Best Picture
Year	Name	Film	Status	Notes	Ref(s)
1993 (66th)	Jan Chapman	The Piano	Nominated	First Australian to be nominated for Best Picture.	
1996 (68th)	Bruce Davey; Mel Gibson	Braveheart	Won	First Australians to win for Best Picture. Gibson was born in the United States, moved to Australia at age 12. Shared with Alan Ladd, Jr.	
1996 (68th)	Bill Miller; George Miller; Doug Mitchell	Babe	Nominated		
1996 (68th)	Jane Scott	Shine	Nominated		
1998 (71st)	Grant Hill	The Thin Red Line	Nominated	Shared with Robert Geisler and John Roberdeau.	
2001 (74th)	Baz Luhrmann; Martin Brown	Moulin Rouge!	Nominated		
2003 (76th)	Peter Weir	Master and Commander: The Far Side of the World	Nominated	Shared with Samuel Goldwyn, Jr. and Duncan Henderson.	
2009 (82nd)	Carolynne Cunningham	District 9	Nominated	Shared with Peter Jackson.	
2010 (83rd)	Emile Sherman	The King's Speech	Won	Shared with Iain Canning.	
2011 (84th)	Grant Hill	The Tree of Life	Nominated	First Australian with multiple nominations in this category. Shared with Dede Gardner, Sarah Green and Bill Pohlad.	
2015 (88th)	George Miller; Doug Mitchell	Mad Max: Fury Road	Nominated		
2016 (89th)	Bruce Davey; Paul Currie	Hacksaw Ridge	Nominated	Shared with Bill Mechanic, David Permut, Terry Benedict, and Brian Oliver.	
2016 (89th)	Angie Fielder; Emile Sherman	Lion	Nominated	Shared with Iain Canning.	
2021 (94th)	Jane Campion; Emile Sherman	The Power of the Dog	Nominated	Campion was born in New Zealand but resides in Australia. Shared with Tanya Seghatchian, Iain Canning, and Roger Frappier.	
2022 (95th)	Baz Luhrmann; Catherine Martin	Elvis	Nominated	Shared with Gail Berman, Patrick McCormack, and Schuyler Weiss.	
2023 (96th)	Margot Robbie	Barbie	Nominated	Shared with David Heyman, Tom Ackerley, and Robbie Brenner.	

=== Best International Feature Film ===
Note: The Academy Award in this category is awarded to countries, not individuals. This list contains directors of nominated films, who typically accept the award on behalf of their country.

Academy Award for Best International Feature Film
Year	Name	Film	Status	Notes	Ref(s)
2016 (89th)	Martin Butler; Bentley Dean	Tanna	Nominated	First Australian film to make the final round nominations in this category.	

=== Best Documentary Feature Film ===
Academy Award for Best Documentary Feature Film
Year	Name	Film	Status	Notes	Ref(s)
1942 (15th)	Ken G. Hall	Kokoda Front Line!	Won	First Australian to win and be nominated for Best Documentary Feature Film and first to win an Academy Award in any category.	
1980 (53rd)	David Bradbury	Front Line	Nominated		
1983 (56th)	Robin Anderson; Bob Connolly	First Contact	Nominated		
1986 (59th)	David Bradbury	Chile: Hasta Cuando?	Nominated	First Australian with multiple nominations in this category.	
2007 (80th)	Eva Orner	Taxi to the Dark Side	Won	Shared with Alex Gibney.	

=== Best Documentary Short Film ===
Academy Award for Best Documentary Short Film
Year	Name	Film	Status	Notes	Ref(s)
1947 (20th)	Australian News & Information Bureau	School in the Mailbox	Nominated		
1979 (52nd)	Phillip Borsos	Nails	Nominated		
2024 (97th)	Maya Gnyp	I Am Ready, Warden	Nominated	Shared with Smriti Mundhra	

=== Best Animated Feature ===
Academy Award for Best Animated Feature
Year	Name	Film	Status	Notes	Ref(s)
2006 (79th)	George Miller	Happy Feet	Won	First Australian to win and be nominated for Best Animated Feature.	
2024 (97th)	Adam Elliot; Liz Kearney	Memoir of a Snail	Nominated		

=== Best Animated Short Film ===
Academy Award for Best Animated Short Film
Year	Name	Film	Status	Notes	Ref(s)
1977 (50th)	Suzanne Baker	Leisure	Won	First Australian to win and be nominated for Best Animated Short Film and first Australian woman to win an Academy Award in any category.	
2003 (76th)	Adam Elliot	Harvie Krumpet	Won	Elliot has since donated his Oscar to the Australian Centre for the Moving Image (ACMI).	
2004 (77th)	Sejong Park; Andrew Gregory	Birthday Boy	Nominated		
2005 (78th)	Anthony Lucas	The Mysterious Geographic Explorations of Jasper Morello	Nominated		
2010 (83rd)	Shaun Tan	The Lost Thing	Won	Shared with Andrew Ruhemann.	
2022 (95th)	Lachlan Pendragon	An Ostrich Told Me the World Is Fake and I Think I Believe It	Nominated		

=== Best Live Action Short Film ===
Academy Award for Best Live Action Short Film
Year	Name	Film	Status	Notes	Ref(s)
2006 (79th)	Peter Templeman; Stuart Parkyn	The Saviour	Nominated	First Australians to be nominated for Best Live Action Short Film.	
2008 (81st)	Tamara Anghie	New Boy	Nominated	Nominated with Steph Green.	
2010 (83rd)	Luke Doolan; Drew Bailey	Miracle Fish	Nominated		
2017 (90th)	Derin Seale; Josh Lawson	The Eleven O'Clock	Nominated		

== Performance ==
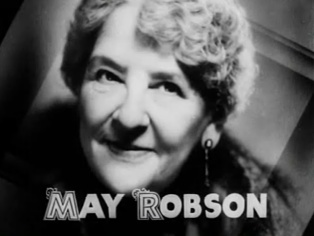
May Robson was the first Australian-born person to be nominated in any category, receiving the Best Actress nomination for Lady for a Day (1933).

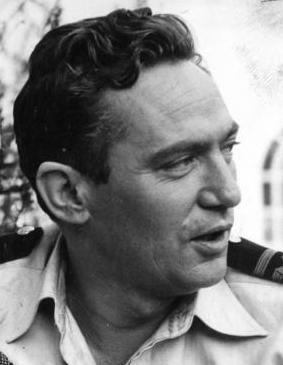
Peter Finch was the first Australian to win for acting and the first actor to receive a posthumous Academy Award, winning Best Actor for Network (1976).

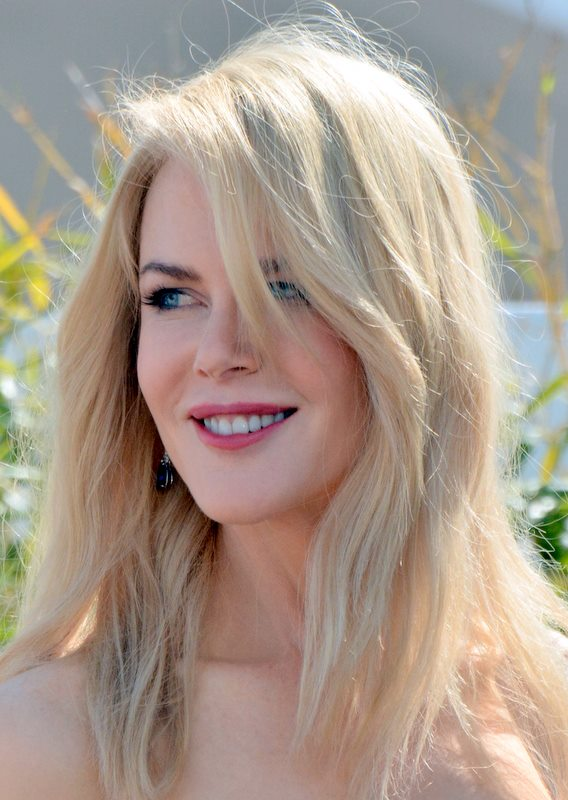
Nicole Kidman was the first Australian to win Best Actress for The Hours (2002).

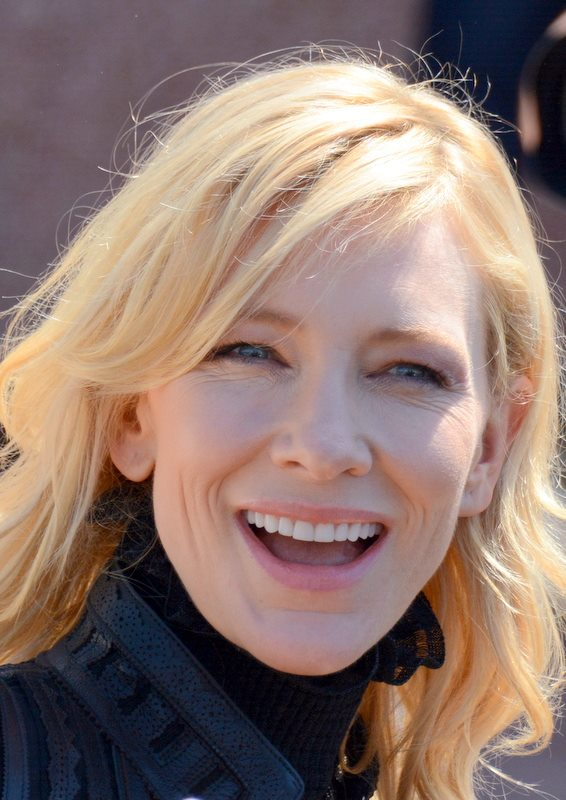
Cate Blanchett has been nominated for eight Academy Awards, more than any other individual Australian. She won Best Supporting Actress for The Aviator (2004) and Best Actress for Blue Jasmine (2013).

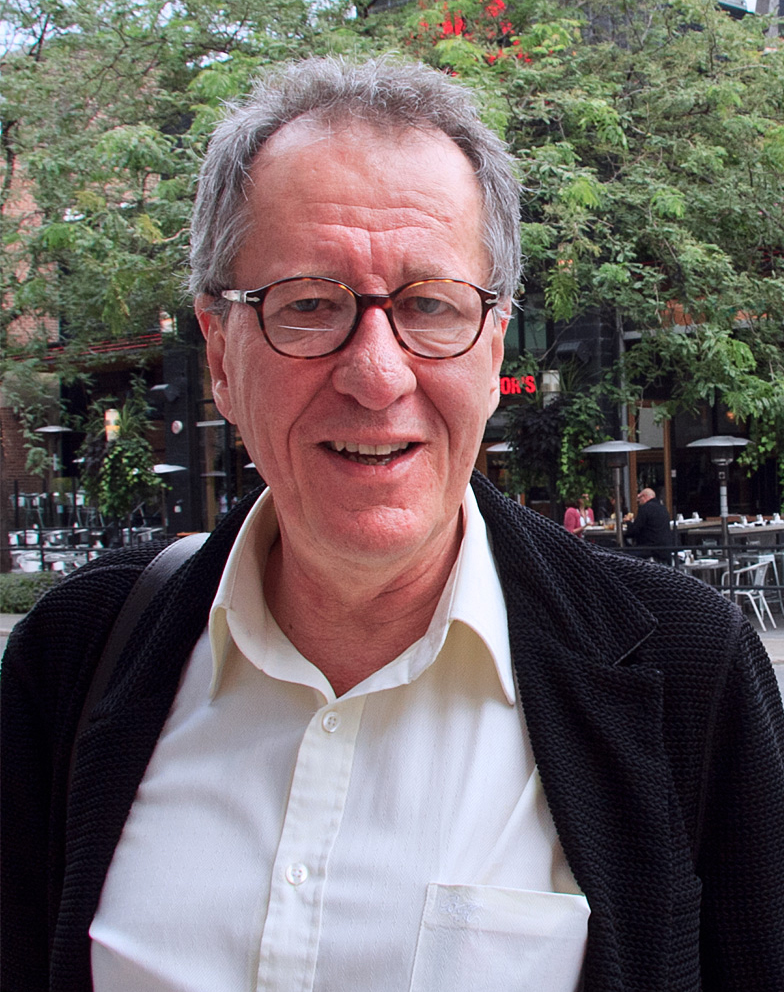
Geoffrey Rush has been nominated across acting categories and won Best Actor for Shine (1996).

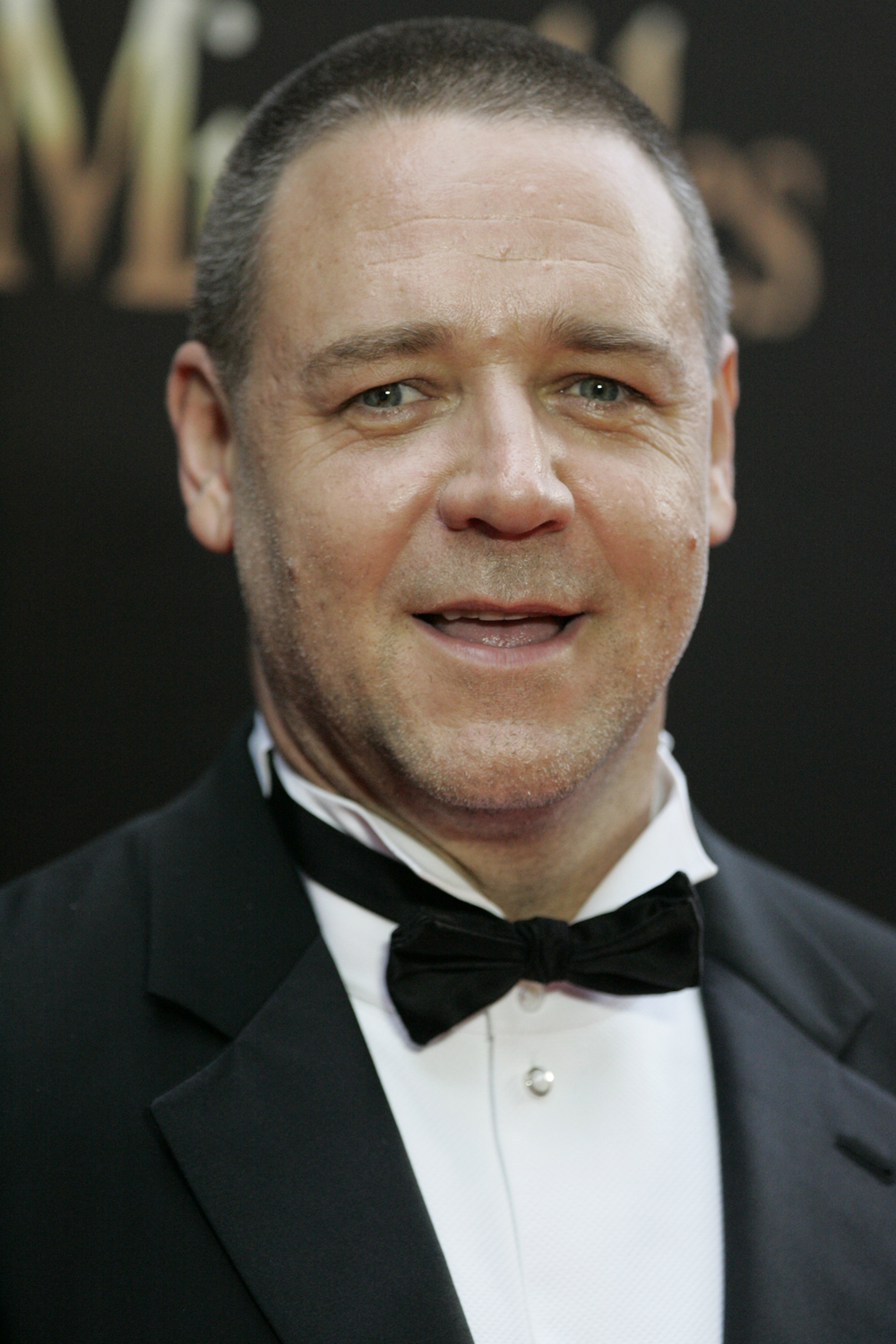
Russell Crowe received three consecutive Best Actor nominations, winning for Gladiator (2000).

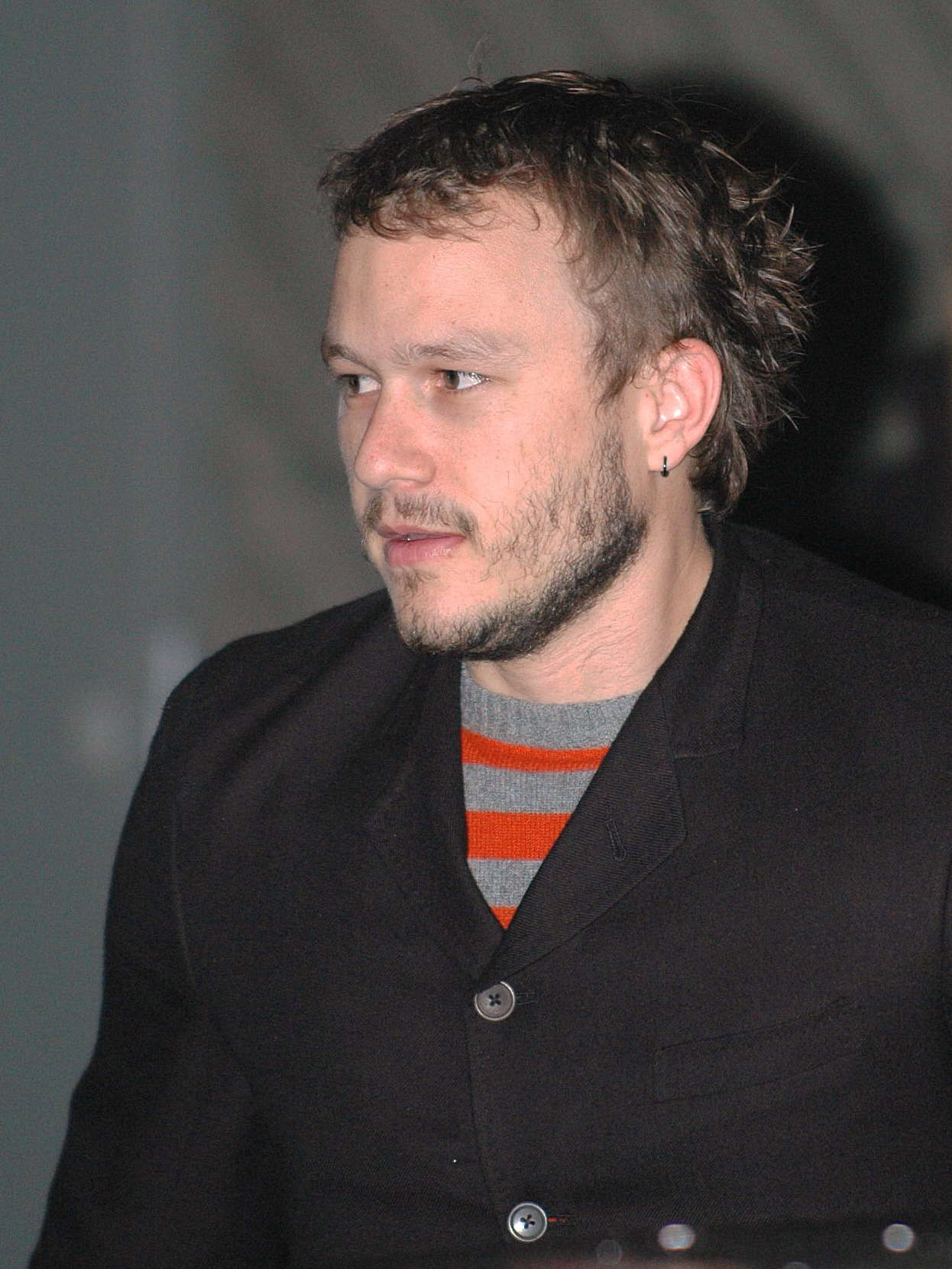
Heath Ledger became just the second performer to win posthumously, winning Best Supporting Actor for The Dark Knight (2008).

=== Best Actor ===
Academy Award for Best Actor
Year	Name	Film	Status	Notes	Ref(s)
1971 (44th)	Peter Finch	Sunday Bloody Sunday	Nominated	First English-Australian to be nominated for Best Actor.	
1976 (49th)	Peter Finch	Network	Won	First English-Australian to win for Best Actor and first with multiple nominations in this category. First ever posthumous winner in any acting category.	
1996 (69th)	Geoffrey Rush	Shine	Won	First Australian male actor to be nominated across acting categories (Best Supporting Actor for Shakespeare in Love).	
1999 (72nd)	Russell Crowe	The Insider	Nominated	Crowe moved from his native New Zealand when he was four years old and currently resides in Australia.	
2000 (73rd)	Russell Crowe	Gladiator	Won	First Australian with nominations in consecutive years in this category.	
2000 (73rd)	Geoffrey Rush	Quills	Nominated		
2001 (74th)	Russell Crowe	A Beautiful Mind	Nominated		
2005 (78th)	Heath Ledger	Brokeback Mountain	Nominated		
2012 (85th)	Hugh Jackman	Les Misérables	Nominated		

=== Best Actress ===
Academy Award for Best Actress
Year	Name	Film	Status	Notes	Ref(s)
1932/33 (6th)	May Robson	Lady for a Day	Nominated	First Australian to be nominated for Best Actress and first to be nominated for an Academy Award in any category.	
1984 (57th)	Judy Davis	A Passage to India	Nominated	First Australian to be nominated across acting categories (Best Supporting Actress for Husbands and Wives).	
1998 (71st)	Cate Blanchett	Elizabeth	Nominated		
2001 (74th)	Nicole Kidman	Moulin Rouge!	Nominated	Kidman was born in the United States, moved to Australia at age 3.	
2002 (75th)	Nicole Kidman	The Hours	Won	First Australian to win for Best Actress and first with multiple nominations in this category, and in consecutive years.	
2003 (76th)	Keisha Castle-Hughes	Whale Rider	Nominated	Australian born, New Zealand actress.	
2003 (76th)	Naomi Watts	21 Grams	Nominated	British born, Australian actress.	
2007 (80th)	Cate Blanchett	Elizabeth: The Golden Age	Nominated	First Australian and the first woman to be nominated for portraying the same character in different films (Queen Elizabeth I of England). First Australian to be nominated for multiple acting Oscars in the same year (Best Supporting Actress for I'm Not There).	
2010 (83rd)	Nicole Kidman	Rabbit Hole	Nominated		
2012 (85th)	Naomi Watts	The Impossible	Nominated		
2013 (86th)	Cate Blanchett	Blue Jasmine	Won	First Australian to win across acting categories (Best Supporting Actress for The Aviator).	
2015 (88th)	Cate Blanchett	Carol	Nominated		
2017 (90th)	Margot Robbie	I, Tonya	Nominated		
2021 (94th)	Nicole Kidman	Being the Ricardos	Nominated		
2022 (95th)	Cate Blanchett	Tár	Nominated		
2025 (98th)	Rose Byrne	If I Had Legs I'd Kick You	Nominated		

=== Best Supporting Actor ===
Academy Award for Best Supporting Actor
Year	Name	Film	Status	Notes	Ref(s)
1998 (71st)	Geoffrey Rush	Shakespeare in Love	Nominated	First Australian to be nominated for Best Supporting Actor. First Australian male actor to be nominated across acting categories (Best Actor for Shine).	
2008 (81st)	Heath Ledger	The Dark Knight	Won	First Australian to win for Best Supporting Actor and first ever posthumous winner in supporting acting category.	
2010 (83rd)	Geoffrey Rush	The King's Speech	Nominated	First Australian with multiple nominations in this category.	
2021 (94th)	Kodi Smit-McPhee	The Power of the Dog	Nominated		
2024 (97th)	Guy Pearce	The Brutalist	Nominated		
2025 (98th)	Jacob Elordi	Frankenstein	Nominated		

=== Best Supporting Actress ===
Academy Award for Best Supporting Actress
Year	Name	Film	Status	Notes	Ref(s)
1940 (13th)	Judith Anderson	Rebecca	Nominated	First Australian to be nominated for Best Supporting Actress.	
1963 (36th)	Diane Cilento	Tom Jones	Nominated		
1992 (65th)	Judy Davis	Husbands and Wives	Nominated	First Australian to be nominated across acting categories (Best Actress for A Passage to India).	
1998 (71st)	Rachel Griffiths	Hilary and Jackie	Nominated		
1999 (72nd)	Toni Collette	The Sixth Sense	Nominated		
2004 (77th)	Cate Blanchett	The Aviator	Won	First Australian to win for Best Supporting Actress. First Australian to win across acting categories (Best Actress for Blue Jasmine); First actor to win an Oscar for portraying a real Oscar winner (Katharine Hepburn).	
2006 (79th)	Cate Blanchett	Notes on a Scandal	Nominated	First Australian with multiple nominations in this category.	
2007 (80th)	Cate Blanchett	I'm Not There	Nominated	First Australian to be nominated for multiple acting Oscars in the same year (Best Actress for Elizabeth: The Golden Age).	
2010 (83rd)	Jacki Weaver	Animal Kingdom	Nominated		
2012 (85th)	Jacki Weaver	Silver Linings Playbook	Nominated		
2016 (89th)	Nicole Kidman	Lion	Nominated		
2019 (92nd)	Margot Robbie	Bombshell	Nominated		

== Craft ==
=== Best Cinematography ===
Academy Award for Best Cinematography
Year	Name	Film	Status	Notes	Ref(s)
1950 (23rd)	Robert Krasker	The Third Man	Won	First Australian to win and be nominated for Best Cinematography, Black and White.	
1985 (58th)	John Seale	Witness	Nominated		
1988 (61st)	John Seale	Rain Man	Nominated	First Australian with multiple nominations in this category.	
1990 (63rd)	Dean Semler	Dances with Wolves	Won		
1996 (69th)	John Seale	The English Patient	Won		
2001 (74th)	Andrew Lesnie	The Lord of the Rings: The Fellowship of the Ring	Won		
2001 (74th)	Donald McAlpine	Moulin Rouge!	Nominated		
2002 (75th)	Dion Beebe	Chicago	Nominated	Beebe was born in Australia but moved to South Africa at the age of 4.	
2003 (76th)	Russell Boyd	Master and Commander: The Far Side of the World	Won		
2003 (76th)	John Seale	Cold Mountain	Nominated		
2005 (78th)	Dion Beebe	Memoirs of a Geisha	Won		
2015 (88th)	John Seale	Mad Max: Fury Road	Nominated		
2016 (89th)	Greig Fraser	Lion	Nominated		
2021 (94th)	Greig Fraser	Dune	Won		
2021 (94th)	Ari Wegner	The Power of the Dog	Nominated		
2022 (95th)	Mandy Walker	Elvis	Nominated		
2024 (97th)	Greig Fraser	Dune: Part Two	Nominated		

=== Best Costume Design ===
Academy Award for Best Costume Design
Year	Name	Film	Status	Notes	Ref(s)
1951 (24th)	Orry-Kelly	An American in Paris	Won	First Australian to win and be nominated for Best Costume Design, Colour. Shared with Walter Plunkett and Irene Sharaff.	
1957 (30th)	Orry-Kelly	Les Girls	Won	First Australian with multiple wins and nominations in this category.	
1959 (32nd)	Orry-Kelly	Some Like It Hot	Won	Best Costume Design, Black and White.	
1962 (35th)	Orry-Kelly	Gypsy	Nominated	Best Costume Design, Colour.	
1966 (39th)	Jocelyn Rickards	Morgan – A Suitable Case for Treatment	Nominated	Best Costume Design, Black and White.	
1967 (40th)	John Truscott	Camelot	Won		
1980 (53rd)	Anna Senior	My Brilliant Career	Nominated		
1993 (66th)	Janet Patterson	The Piano	Nominated		
1995 (68th)	Lizzy Gardiner; Tim Chappel	The Adventures of Priscilla, Queen of the Desert	Won		
1996 (69th)	Janet Patterson	The Portrait of a Lady	Nominated		
1997 (70th)	Janet Patterson	Oscar and Lucinda	Nominated		
2001 (74th)	Catherine Martin; Angus Strathie	Moulin Rouge!	Won		
2003 (76th)	Wendy Stites	Master and Commander: The Far Side of the World	Nominated		
2008 (81st)	Catherine Martin	Australia	Nominated		
2009 (82nd)	Janet Patterson	Bright Star	Nominated		
2013 (86th)	Catherine Martin	The Great Gatsby	Won	Hold the record for most wins by an Australian in any category, with four.	
2013 (86th)	Michael Wilkinson	American Hustle	Nominated		
2022 (95th)	Catherine Martin	Elvis	Nominated		

=== Best Director ===
Academy Award for Best Director
Year	Name	Film	Status	Notes	Ref(s)
1942 (15th)	John Farrow	Wake Island	Nominated	First Australian to be nominated for Best Director. Farrow ceased to be an Australian citizen in 1947 when he adopted US citizenship.	
1983 (56th)	Bruce Beresford	Tender Mercies	Nominated		
1985 (58th)	Peter Weir	Witness	Nominated		
1989 (62nd)	Peter Weir	Dead Poets Society	Nominated	First Australian with multiple nominations in this category.	
1993 (66th)	Jane Campion	The Piano	Nominated	Campion was born in New Zealand but resides in Australia.	
1995 (68th)	Chris Noonan	Babe	Nominated		
1995 (68th)	Mel Gibson	Braveheart	Won	First Australian to win for Best Director. Gibson was born in the United States, moved to Australia at age 12.	
1996 (69th)	Scott Hicks	Shine	Nominated	Hicks was born in Uganda, moved to Australia at age 14.	
1998 (71st)	Peter Weir	The Truman Show	Nominated		
2003 (76th)	Peter Weir	Master and Commander: The Far Side of the World	Nominated		
2010 (83rd)	Tom Hooper	The King's Speech	Won	Hooper is British-Australian.	
2015 (88th)	George Miller	Mad Max: Fury Road	Nominated		
2016 (89th)	Mel Gibson	Hacksaw Ridge	Nominated		
2021 (94th)	Jane Campion	The Power of the Dog	Won	First woman with multiple nominations in this category. Campion was born in New Zealand but resides in Australia.	

=== Best Film Editing ===
Academy Award for Best Film Editing
Year	Name	Film	Status	Notes	Ref(s)
1961 (34th)	Alan Osbiston	The Guns of Navarone	Nominated	First Australian to be nominated for Best Film Editing; Osbiston was an Australian-born British film editor.	
1993 (66th)	Veronika Jenet	The Piano	Nominated		
1994 (67th)	Richard Francis-Bruce	The Shawshank Redemption	Nominated		
1995 (68th)	Richard Francis-Bruce	Se7en	Nominated	First Australian with multiple nominations in this category, and in consecutive years.	
1995 (68th)	Marcus D'Arcy	Babe	Nominated	Shared with Jay Friedkin.	
1996 (69th)	Pip Karmel	Shine	Nominated		
1997 (70th)	Richard Francis-Bruce	Air Force One	Nominated		
2001 (74th)	Jill Bilcock	Moulin Rouge!	Nominated		
2003 (76th)	Lee Smith	Master and Commander: The Far Side of the World	Nominated		
2008 (81st)	Lee Smith	The Dark Knight	Nominated		
2008 (81st)	Kirk Baxter	The Curious Case of Benjamin Button	Nominated	Shared with Angus Wall.	
2010 (83rd)	Kirk Baxter	The Social Network	Won	Shared with Angus Wall.	
2011 (84th)	Kirk Baxter	The Girl with the Dragon Tattoo	Won	First Australian to win in consecutive years in any category. Shared with Angus Wall.	
2015 (88th)	Margaret Sixel	Mad Max: Fury Road	Won	Sixel was a South African-born Australian film editor.	
2017 (90th)	Lee Smith	Dunkirk	Won		
2017 (90th)	Paul Machliss	Baby Driver	Nominated	Shared with Jonathan Amos.	
2021 (94th)	Peter Sciberras	The Power of the Dog	Nominated		
2022 (95th)	Matt Villa	Elvis	Nominated	Shared with Jonathan Redmond.	

=== Best Makeup and Hairstyling ===
Academy Award for Best Makeup and Hairstyling
Year	Name	Film	Status	Notes	Refs
1995 (68th)	Paul Pattison	Braveheart	Won	First Australian to win and be nominated for Best Makeup and Hairstyling. Shared with Lois Burwell and Peter Frampton.	
2005 (78th)	Dave Elsey; Nikki Gooley	Star Wars: Episode III – Revenge of the Sith	Nominated		
2010 (83rd)	Dave Elsey	The Wolfman	Won	First Australian with multiple nominations in this category. Shared with Rick Baker.	
2012 (85th)	Rick Findlater	The Hobbit: An Unexpected Journey	Nominated	Shared with Peter King and Tami Lane.	
2015 (88th)	Lesley Vanderwalt; Elka Wardega; Damian Martin	Mad Max: Fury Road	Won	Vanderwalt is a New Zealand-born Australian.	

=== Best Music, Original Score ===
Academy Award for Best Original Score
Year	Name	Film	Status	Notes	Ref(s)
1974 (47th)	Douglas Gamley	The Little Prince	Nominated	First Australian to be nominated for Best Music, Scoring Original Song Score and/or Adaptation. Shared with Angela Morley, Frederick Loewe, and Alan Jay Lerner.	
1996 (69th)	David Hirschfelder	Shine	Nominated	Best Music, Original Dramatic Score. First Australian with multiple nominations in this category.	
1998 (71st)	David Hirschfelder	Elizabeth	Nominated	Best Music, Original Dramatic Score. First Australian with multiple nominations in this category.	

=== Best Music, Original Song ===
Academy Award for Best Original Song
Year	Name	Song	Film	Result	Notes	Refs
1978 (51st)	John Farrar	"Hopelessly Devoted to You"	Grease	Nominated	First Australian to be nominated for Best Original Song.	
1981 (54th)	Peter Allen	"Arthur's Theme (Best That You Can Do)"	Arthur	Won	First Australian to win for Best Original Song. Shared with Burt Bacharach, Christopher Cross, and Carole Bayer Sager.	
2025 (98th)	Nick Cave	"Train Dreams"	Trains Dreams	Nominated	Shared with Bryce Dessner.	

=== Best Production Design ===
Academy Award for Best Production Design
Year	Name	Film	Status	Notes	Ref(s)
1967 (40th)	John Truscott	Camelot	Won	First Australian to win and be nominated for Best Production Design. Shared with Edward Carrere and John W. Brown.	
1969 (42nd)	Ken Muggleston	Oliver!	Won	Shared with Vernon Dixon.	
1992 (65th)	Luciana Arrighi	Howards End	Won	Arrighi is an Italian who was born in Brazil and raised in Australia. Shared with Ian Whittaker.	
1993 (66th)	Luciana Arrighi	The Remains of the Day	Nominated	First Australian with multiple nominations in this category, and in consecutive years. Shared with Ian Whittaker	
1995 (68th)	Roger Ford; Kerrie Brown	Babe	Nominated		
1996 (69th)	Catherine Martin	Romeo + Juliet	Nominated	Shared with Brigitte Broch.	
1999 (72nd)	Luciana Arrighi	Anna and the King	Nominated	Shared with Ian Whittaker.	
2001 (74th)	Catherine Martin	Moulin Rouge!	Won	Shared with Brigitte Broch.	
2008 (81st)	Michael Carlin	The Duchess	Nominated		
2013 (86th)	Catherine Martin; Beverley Dunn	The Great Gatsby	Won	Martin was the first Australian with multiple wins in this category. Martin hold the record for most wins by an Australian in any category, with four.	
2015 (88th)	Colin Gibson; Lisa Thompson	Mad Max: Fury Road	Won		
2018 (91st)	Fiona Crombie	The Favourite	Nominated	Shared with Alice Felton.	
2022 (95th)	Catherine Martin; Beverly Dunn	Elvis	Nominated	Shared with Karen Murphy.	
2025 (98th)	Fiona Crombie	Hamnet	Nominated	Shared with Alice Felton.	

=== Best Sound Mixing ===
Academy Award for Best Sound Mixing
Year	Name	Film	Status	Notes	Ref(s)
1998 (71st)	Paul Brincat	The Thin Red Line	Nominated	Shared with Andy Nelson and Anna Behlmer	
1999 (72nd)	David Lee	The Matrix	Won	Shared with John T. Reitz, Gregg Rudloff, and David E. Campbell	
2001 (74th)	Roger Savage; Guntis Sics	Moulin Rouge!	Nominated	Shared with Andy Nelson and Anna Behlmer.	
2001 (74th)	Gethin Creagh	The Lord of the Rings: The Fellowship of the Ring	Nominated	Creagh was born in New Zealand but is considered Australian. Shared with Christopher Boyes, Michael Semanick, and Hammond Peek.	
2014 (87th)	David Lee	Unbroken	Nominated	First Australian with multiple nominations in this category. Shared with Jon Taylor and Frank A. Montaño.	
2015 (88th)	Ben Osmo	Mad Max: Fury Road	Won	Shared with Chris Jenkins and Gregg Rudloff.	
2016 (89th)	Andy Wright; Robert Mackenzie; Peter Grace	Hacksaw Ridge	Won	Shared with Kevin O'Connell.	
Best Sound
2021 (94th)	Robert Mackenzie; Tara Webb	The Power of the Dog	Nominated	Shared with Richard Flynn.	
2022 (95th)	David Lee	Elvis	Nominated	Shared with Wayne Pashley, Andy Nelson, and Michael Keller.	

=== Best Sound Editing ===
Academy Award for Best Sound Editing
Year	Name	Film	Status	Notes	Ref(s)
2015 (88th)	David White	Mad Max: Fury Road	Won	Shared with Mark Mangini.	
2016 (89th)	Robert Mackenzie; Andy Wright	Hacksaw Ridge	Nominated		

=== Best Visual Effects ===
Academy Award for Best Visual Effects
Year	Name	Film	Status	Notes	Ref(s)
1995 (68th)	John Cox	Babe	Won	First Australian to win and be nominated for Best Visual Effects. Shared with Scott E. Anderson, Charles Gibson, and Neal Scanlan.	
1999 (72nd)	Steve Courtley	The Matrix	Won	Shared with John Gaeta, Janek Sirrs, and Jon Thum.	
2001 (74th)	Ben Snow	Pearl Harbor	Nominated	Shared with Eric Brevig, John Frazier, and Ed Hirsh.	
2002 (75th)	Ben Snow	Star Wars: Episode II – Attack of the Clones	Nominated	First Australian with multiple nominations in this category and in consecutive years. Shared with Rob Coleman, Pablo Helman, and John Knoll.	
2003 (76th)	Nathan McGuinness	Master and Commander: The Far Side of the World	Nominated	Shared with Dan Sudick, Stefen Fangmeier, and Robert Stromberg.	
2008 (81st)	Ben Snow	Iron Man	Nominated	Shared with Shane Mahan, John Nelson, and Dan Sudick.	
2010 (83rd)	Ben Snow; Ged Wright	Iron Man 2	Nominated	Shared with Janek Sirrs and Dan Sudick.	
2010 (83rd)	Joe Farrell	Hereafter	Nominated	Shared with Michael Owens, Bryan Grill, and Stephan Trojansky.	
2012 (85th)	David Clayton	The Hobbit: An Unexpected Journey	Nominated	Shared with Joe Letteri, Eric Saindon, and R. Christopher White.	
2013 (86th)	David Clayton	The Hobbit: The Desolation of Smaug	Nominated	Shared with Joe Letteri, Eric Saindon, and Eric Reynolds.	
2014 (87th)	Tim Crosbie	X-Men: Days of Future Past	Nominated	Shared with Richard Stammers, Lou Pecora, and Cameron Waldbauer.	
2015 (88th)	Andrew Jackson; Dan Oliver	Mad Max: Fury Road	Nominated	Shared with Tom Wood and Andy Williams.	
2016 (89th)	Jason Billington	Deepwater Horizon	Nominated	Shared with Craig Hammack, Jason Snell, and Burt Dalton.	
2020 (93rd)	Matt Sloan; Genevieve Camilleri; Matt Everitt; Brian Cox	Love and Monsters	Nominated		
2021 (94th)	Joe Farrell; Dan Oliver	Shang-Chi and the Legend of the Ten Rings	Nominated	Shared with Christopher Townsend and Sean Noel Walker.	
2024 (97th)	David Clayton; Keith Herft; Peter Stubbs	Better Man	Nominated	Shared with Luke Millar.	
2024 (97th)	Rodney Burke	Kingdom of the Planet of the Apes	Nominated	Shared with Erik Winquist, Stephen Unterfranz, and Paul Story.	

=== Best Writing, Adapted Screenplay ===
Academy Award for Best Writing (Adapted Screenplay)
Year	Name	Film	Status	Notes	Ref(s)
1956 (29th)	John Farrow	Around the World in Eighty Days	Won	Born in Australia but had ceased to be an Australian citizen in 1947 when he adopted US citizenship. Shared with S. J. Perelman and James Poe.	
1980 (53rd)	Jonathan Hardy; David Stevens; Bruce Beresford	Breaker Morant	Nominated	Hardy was born in New Zealand; Stevens in Israel.	
1995 (68th)	George Miller; Chris Noonan	Babe	Nominated		
2016 (89th)	Luke Davies	Lion	Nominated		
2021 (94th)	Jane Campion	The Power of the Dog	Nominated	Campion was born in New Zealand but resides in Australia.	
2023 (96th)	Tony McNamara	Poor Things	Nominated		

=== Best Writing, Original Screenplay ===
Academy Award for Best Writing (Original Screenplay)
Year	Name	Film	Status	Notes	Ref(s)
1957 (30th)	Ivan Goff	Man of a Thousand Faces	Nominated	Shared with Ralph Wheelwright, Robert Wright Campbell and Ben Roberts.	
1986 (59th)	John Cornell; Paul Hogan; Ken Shadie	Crocodile Dundee	Nominated		
1990 (63rd)	Peter Weir	Green Card	Nominated		
1992 (65th)	Nick Enright; George Miller	Lorenzo's Oil	Nominated		
1993 (66th)	Jane Campion	The Piano	Won	Campion was born in New Zealand but resides in Australia.	
1996 (69th)	Scott Hicks; Jan Sardi	Shine	Nominated	Hicks was born in Uganda but moved to Australia at age 14.	
2018 (91st)	Tony McNamara	The Favourite	Nominated	Shared with Deborah Davis.	

== Non-competitive awards ==
=== Academy Honorary Award ===
Academy Honorary Award
Year	Name	Field	Status	Notes	Ref(s)
2022 (95th)	Peter Weir	Director	Won	"a director of consummate skill and artistry whose work reminds us of the power of film to reveal the full range of human experience"	

=== Scientific and Engineering ===
Academy Scientific and Technical Award
Year	Name	Field	Status	Notes	Ref(s)
1997 (70th)	Jim Frazier	Photography	Won	Frazier was awarded for the concept. His fellow recipients Iain Neil, Rick Gelbard were involved in the design and development of the Panavision/Frazier Lens System for motion picture photography.	
1998 (71st)	Gary Tregaskis	Computer software	Won	Gary Tregaskis, for the primary design; Dominique Boisvert, Phillip Panzini, Andre LeBlanc for the development and implementation of the Flame and Inferno software.	
2001 (74th)	Bruce Tulloch; Norman Jackson; Andrew Brent; John Lancken	Development of Digital Audio Dubbing equipment (Fairlight DaD) for film audio dubbing and mixing.	Won	Bruce Tulloch and Norman Jackson developed a technology used by film dubbing engineers to mix film soundtracks. Emilijo Mihatov was Product Manager, Andrew Brent was technical support and John Lancken was market development. The product was manufactured by Fairlight ESP Pty Ltd, Sydney Australia.	
2003 (76th)	Michael Carlos; Andrew Cannon; Christopher Alfred	Digital audio editing for motion picture post-production	Won	Michael Carlos, Andrew Cannon, and Christopher Alfred developed the technology at Fairlight ESP Pty Ltd, Sydney, Australia.	
2010 (83rd)	Tony Clark; Alan Rogers; Neil Wilson; Rory McGregor	Software design and continued development of cineSync, a tool for remote collaboration and review of visual effects	Won		

== Nominations and Winners ==
No. of wins	No. of nominations
59	211

== Records ==
Art director and costume designer Catherine Martin has won four awards from nine nominations, making her the most decorated Australian. She was nominated for Best Picture, Best Costume Design, and Best Production Design, winning the latter two categories. Cate Blanchett is the most nominated individual on this list with eight nominations, which resulted in two wins: for Best Actress and Best Supporting Actress, making her the only Australian to win both acting categories. Peter Weir has received five competitive nominations in the Best Picture, Best Director, and Best Original Screenplay categories without a win; however, he was awarded the Academy Honorary Award in 2022.

May Robson was the first Australian-born person to be nominated for an Academy Award. She received a Best Actress nomination for Lady for a Day in 1933. In 1942, Ken G. Hall became the first Australian to win an Oscar for his documentary Kokoda Front Line! in the Best Documentary category. Suzanne Baker was the first Australian woman to win an Oscar after winning Best Animated Short for Leisure in 1977. Peter Finch was the first Australian to win an acting Oscar and the first performer ever to be awarded posthumously, winning Best Actor for his performance in 1976 for Network. Fellow Australian Heath Ledger became only the second posthumous acting winner when his performance in The Dark Knight earned him Best Supporting Actor in 2008, about 32 years later. Cate Blanchett was the first Australian actor to win more than once in acting categories. Out of the six total Australian performers who have won acting Oscars, only Blanchett, Ledger and Geoffrey Rush were born in Australia; with Finch, Nicole Kidman and Russell Crowe being born outside of Australia, in England, the United States and New Zealand, respectively, and raised in Australia.

Australians have been nominated at least once in all categories. The Oscar for Best Costume Design has been the most successful category for Australians with seven wins from 17 nominations. The Academy Awards for Best Foreign Language Film, Best Original Score, and the Best Documentary (Short Subject) are the only categories in this list where Australians have been nominated without winning.

== See also ==
- Cinema of Australia
- List of Australian submissions for the Academy Award for Best International Feature Film
