= 93rd Academy Awards =

- Official poster
- Date: April 25, 2021
- Site: Union Station; Los Angeles, California, U.S. (Note: The presentation of the Jean Hersholt Humanitarian Award to the Motion Picture & Television Fund was held at the Dolby Theatre in Hollywood, California, and the winner of the Best Director was announced from the Dolby Cinema in Seoul, South Korea. Furthermore, four of the Best Original Song nominees were performed at the Dolby Family Terrace of the Academy Museum of Motion Pictures, and one was performed on location in Húsavík, Iceland.)
- Preshow hosts: Ariana DeBose; Lil Rel Howery
- Produced by: Jesse Collins; Stacey Sher; Steven Soderbergh
- Directed by: Glenn Weiss

Highlights
- Best Picture: Nomadland
- Most awards: Nomadland (3)
- Most nominations: Mank (10)

TV in the United States
- Network: ABC
- Duration: 3 hours, 19 minutes
- Ratings: 10.4 million; 5.9% (Nielsen ratings)

The 93rd Academy Awards ceremony, presented by the Academy of Motion Picture Arts and Sciences (AMPAS), honored films released from January 1, 2020, to February 28, 2021, at Union Station in Los Angeles. The ceremony was held on April 25, 2021, rather than its usual late-February date due to the COVID-19 pandemic. During the ceremony, the AMPAS presented Academy Awards (commonly referred to as Oscars) in 23 categories. The ceremony, televised in the United States by ABC, was produced by Jesse Collins, Stacey Sher, and Steven Soderbergh, and was directed by Glenn Weiss. For the third consecutive year, the ceremony had no official host. In related events, the Academy Scientific and Technical Awards were presented by host Nia DaCosta on February 13, 2021, in a virtual ceremony.

Nomadland won three awards at the main ceremony, including Best Picture. Other winners included The Father, Judas and the Black Messiah, Ma Rainey's Black Bottom, Mank, Soul and Sound of Metal with two awards each, and Another Round, Colette, If Anything Happens I Love You, Minari, My Octopus Teacher, Promising Young Woman, Tenet, and Two Distant Strangers with one. The telecast received mostly negative reviews, and it garnered 10.4 million viewers, making it the least-watched Oscar broadcast since viewership records began for the 46th ceremony in 1974.

== Winners and nominees ==
The nominees for the 93rd Academy Awards were announced on March 15, 2021, by actress Priyanka Chopra and singer Nick Jonas during a live global stream originating from London. Mank led all nominees with ten nominations. The winners were announced during the awards ceremony on April 25. Chinese filmmaker Chloé Zhao became the first woman of color to win Best Director and the second woman overall after Kathryn Bigelow, who won at the 2010 ceremony for directing The Hurt Locker. In addition, the nomination for Emerald Fennell in the same category meant that this also marked the first time two women directors had been nominated for the Oscar for Best Director in the same year. Zhao became the first woman to receive four nominations in a single year. For the first time all films nominated for Best Original Screenplay were also nominated for Best Picture.

At age 83, Anthony Hopkins became the oldest Best Actor nominee ever and the oldest performer to win a competitive acting Oscar. Best Actress winner Frances McDormand became the seventh person to win a third acting Oscar, the third to win three leading performance Oscars, and the second to win Best Actress three times. As a producer of Nomadland, she also was the first woman in history to be nominated for both acting and producing the same film, as well as the first person to win for both.

Best Supporting Actress winner Yuh-jung Youn became the first Korean performer and second Asian woman to win an acting Oscar after Miyoshi Umeki, who won the same category for her role in 1957's Sayonara. With his nominations in Best Supporting Actor and Best Original Song for One Night in Miami..., Leslie Odom Jr. was the fourth consecutive person to earn acting and songwriting nominations for the same film. (Note: The three previous individuals to have earned this distinction are Mary J. Blige for Mudbound, Lady Gaga for A Star Is Born, and Cynthia Erivo for Harriet.)

=== Awards ===
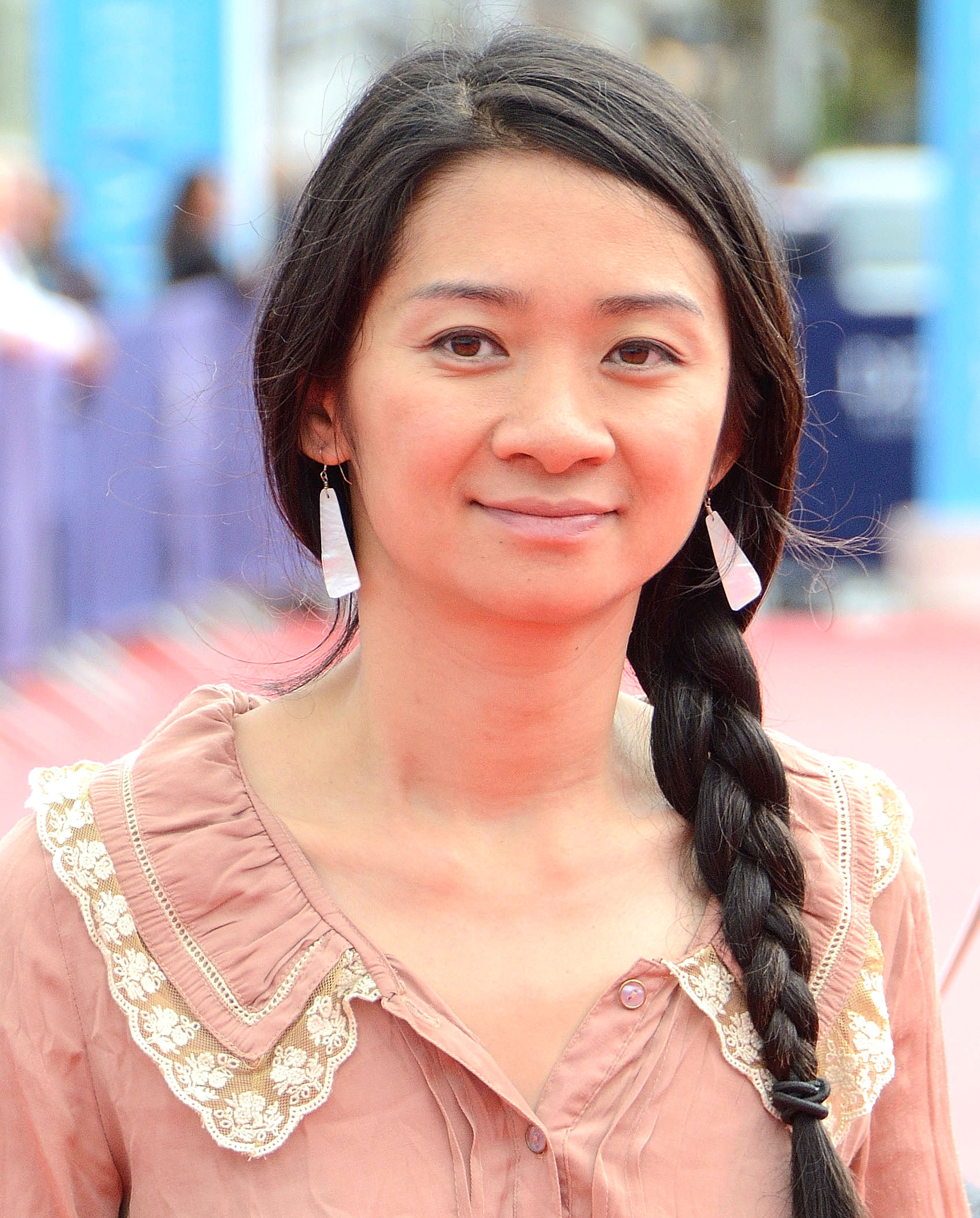
Chloé Zhao, Best Picture co-winner and Best Director winner

Frances McDormand, Best Picture co-winner and Best Actress winner

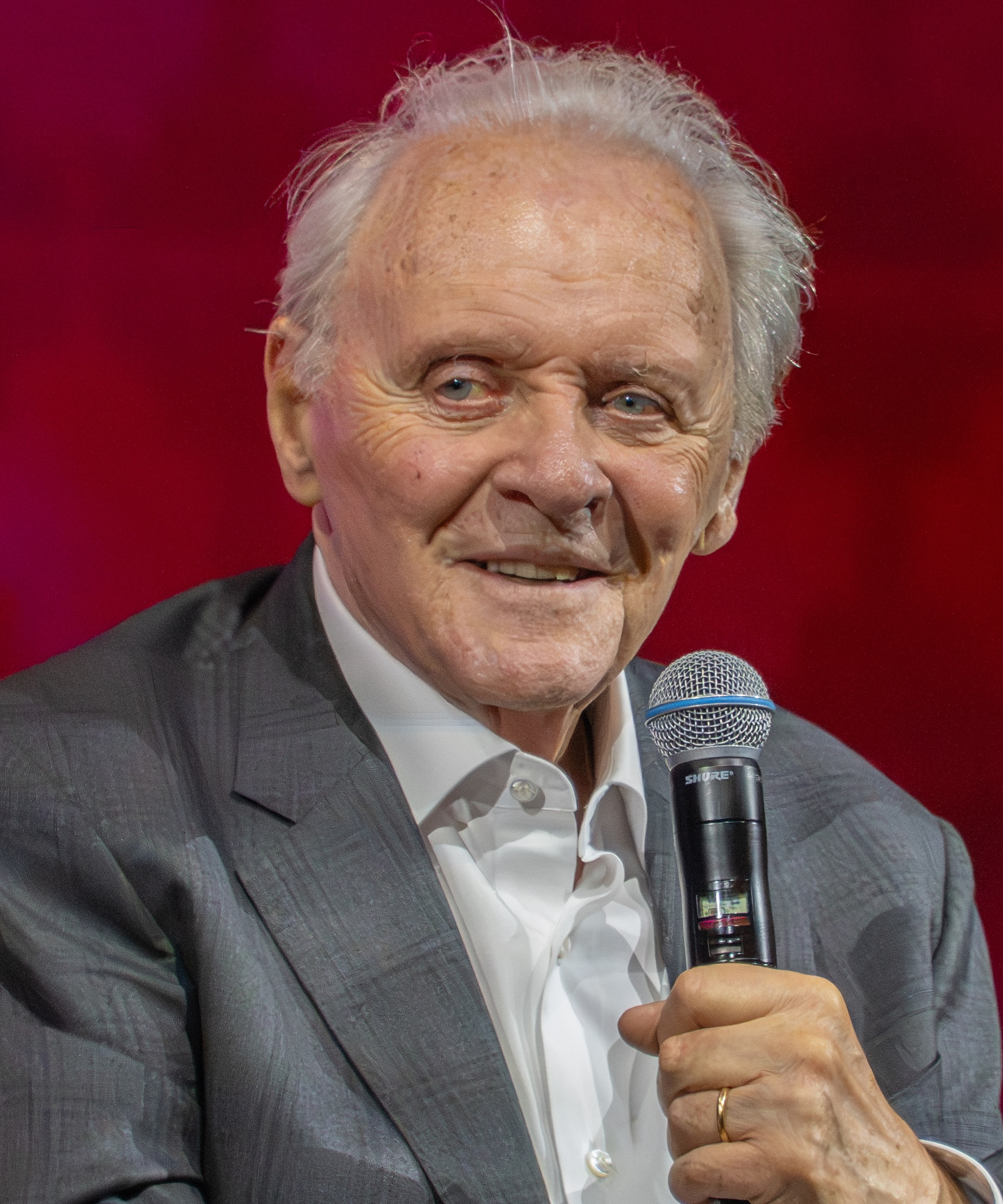
Anthony Hopkins, Best Actor winner

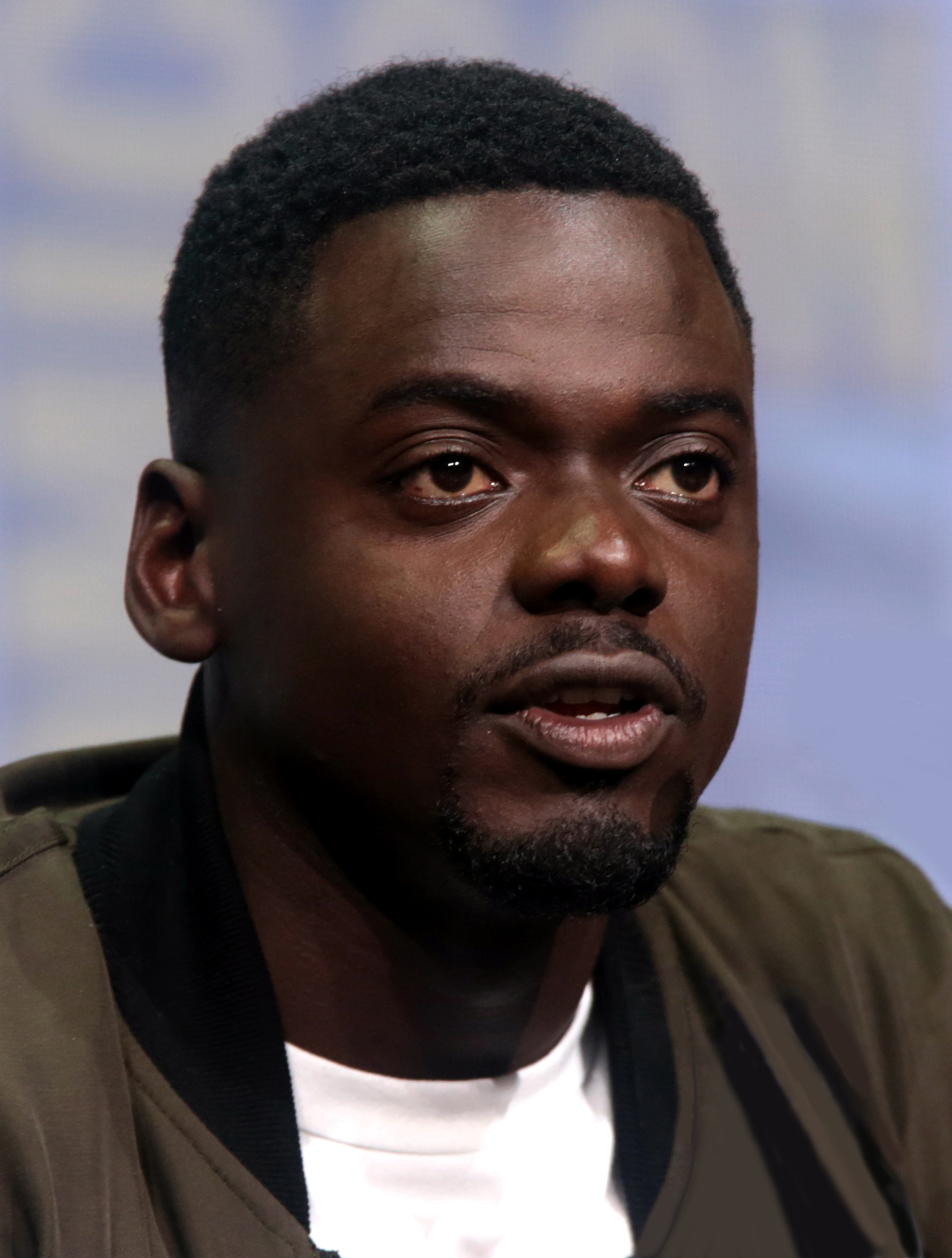
Daniel Kaluuya, Best Supporting Actor winner

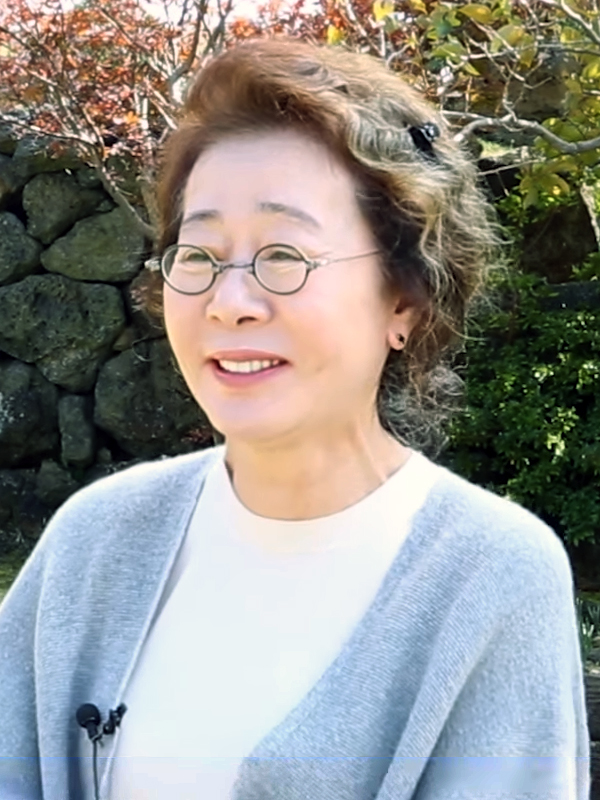
Yuh-jung Youn, Best Supporting Actress winner

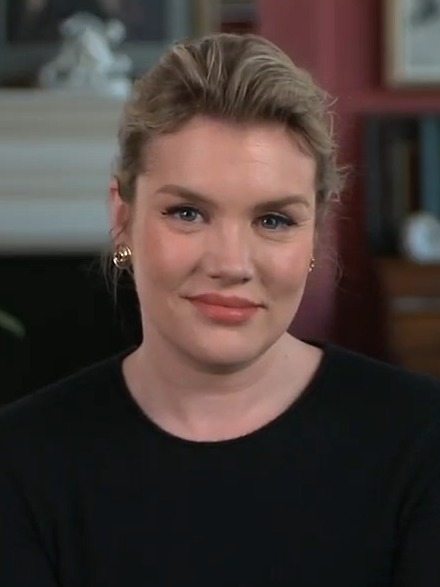
Emerald Fennell, Best Original Screenplay winner

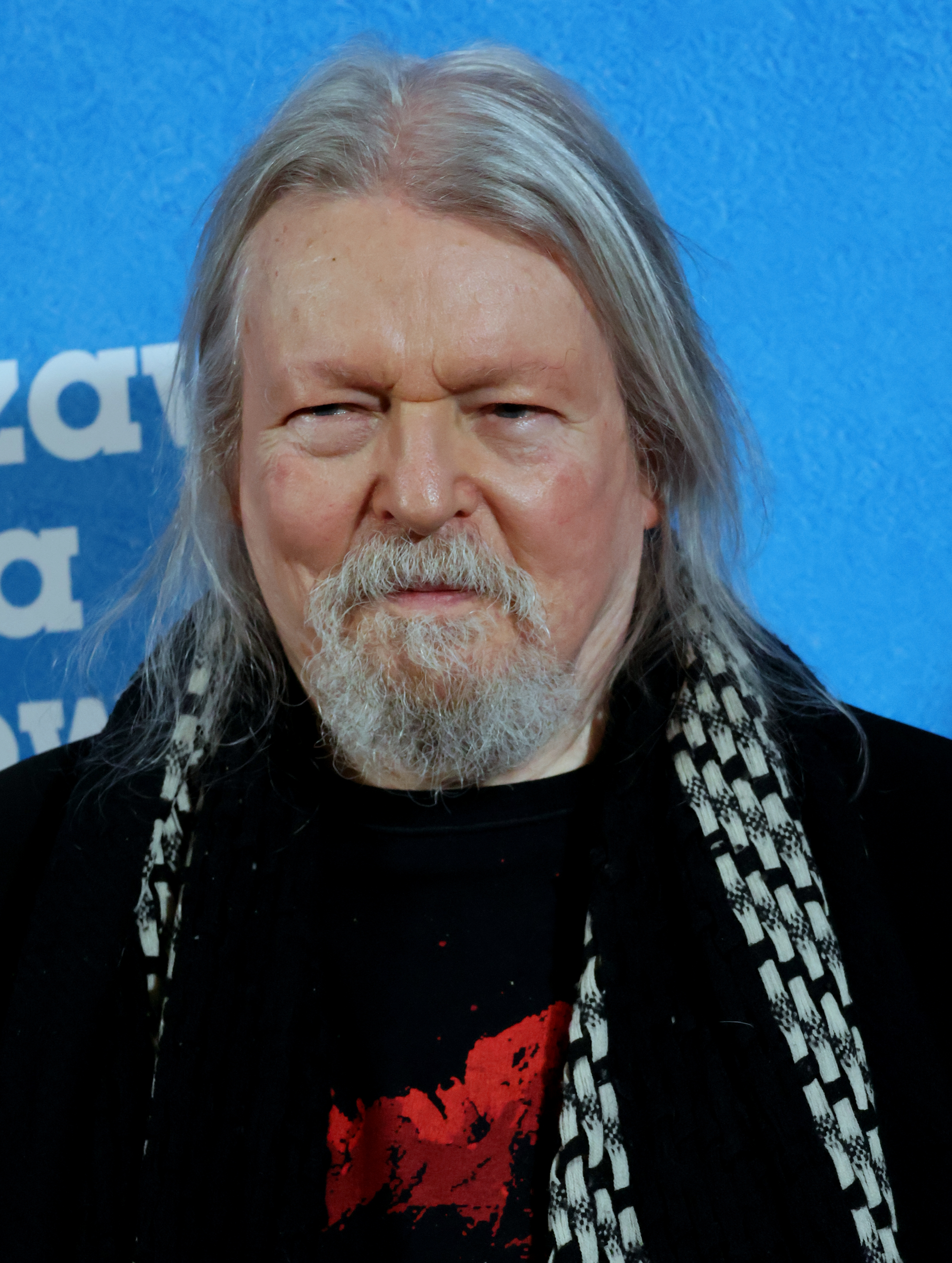
Christopher Hampton, Best Adapted Screenplay co-winner

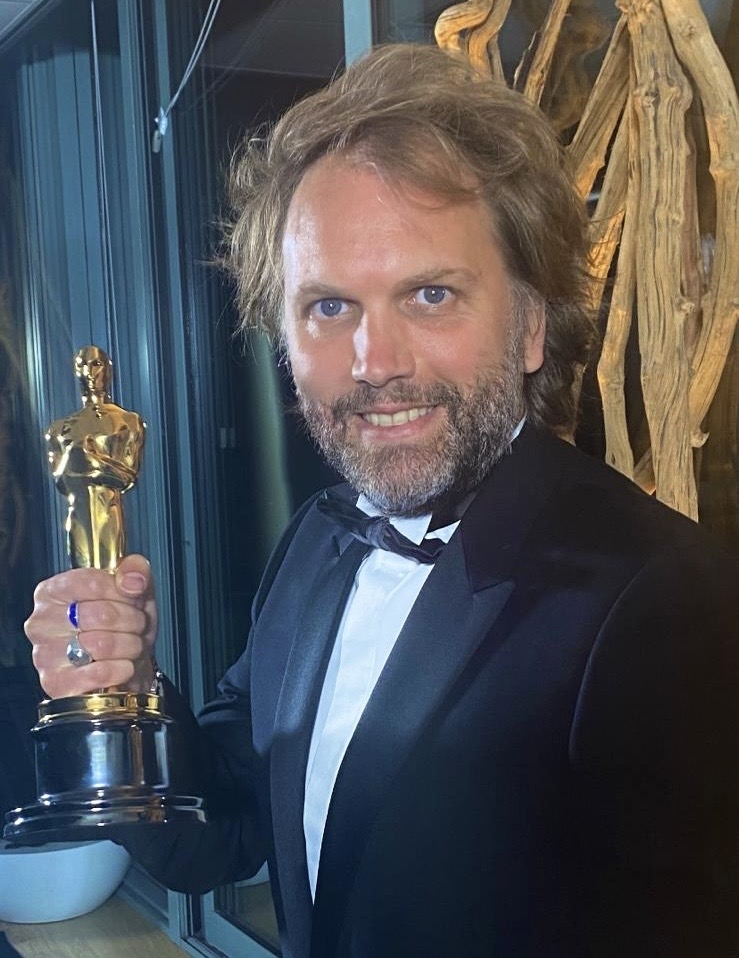
Florian Zeller, Best Adapted Screenplay co-winner, holding his award

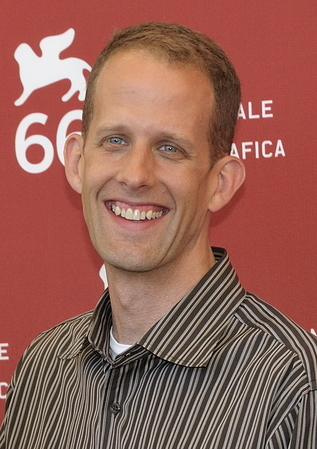
Pete Docter, Best Animated Feature Film co-winner

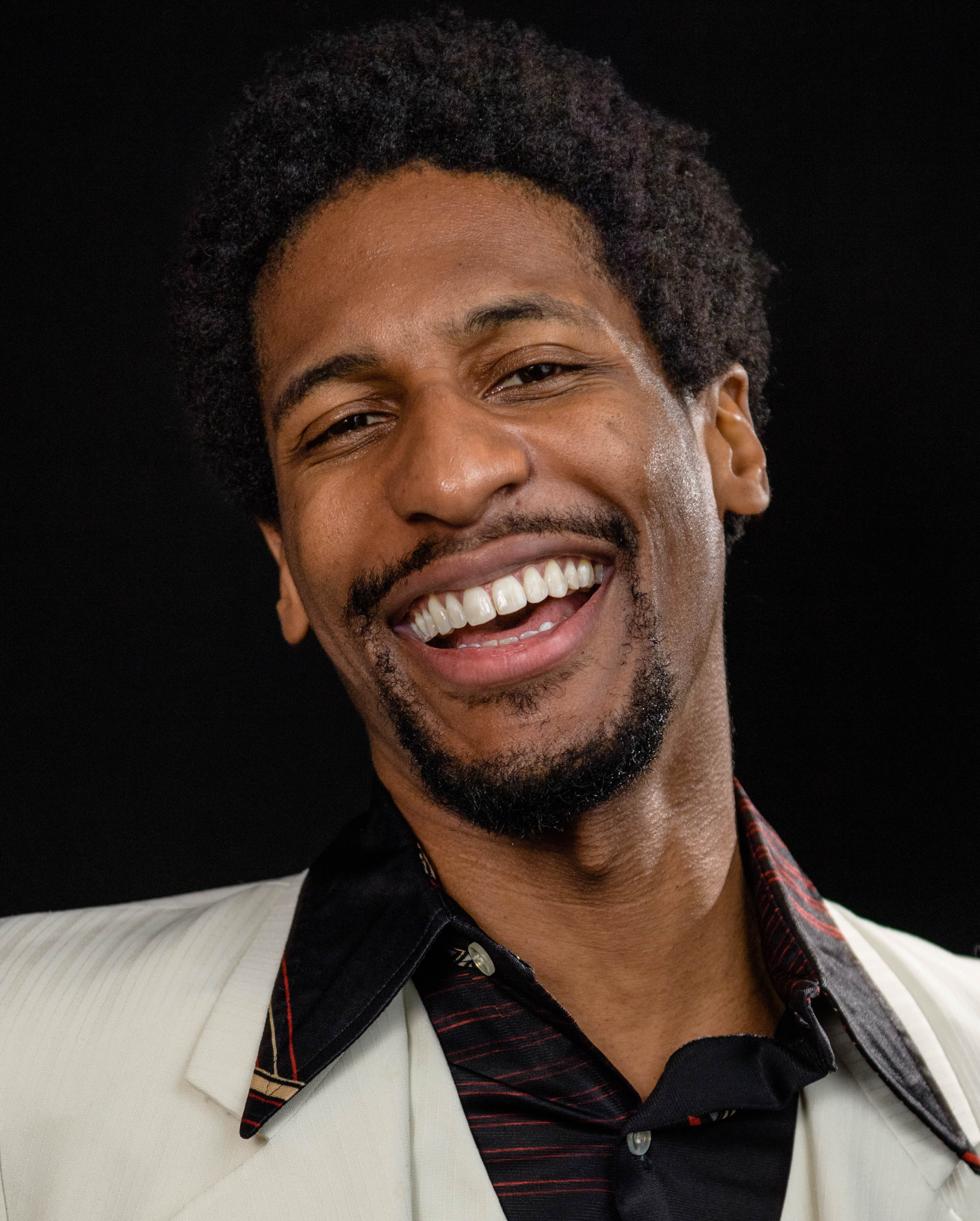
Jon Batiste, Best Original Score co-winner

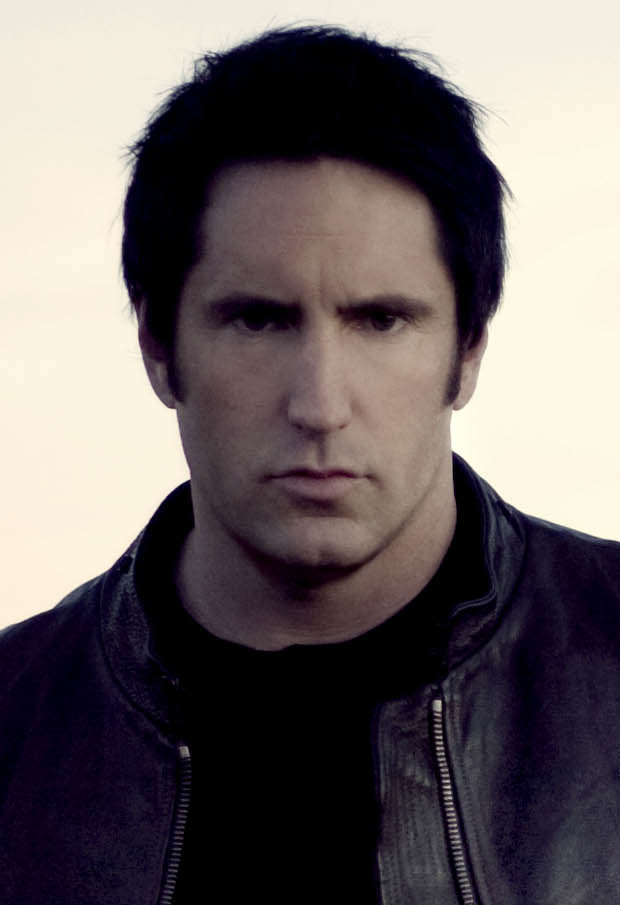
Trent Reznor, Best Original Score co-winner

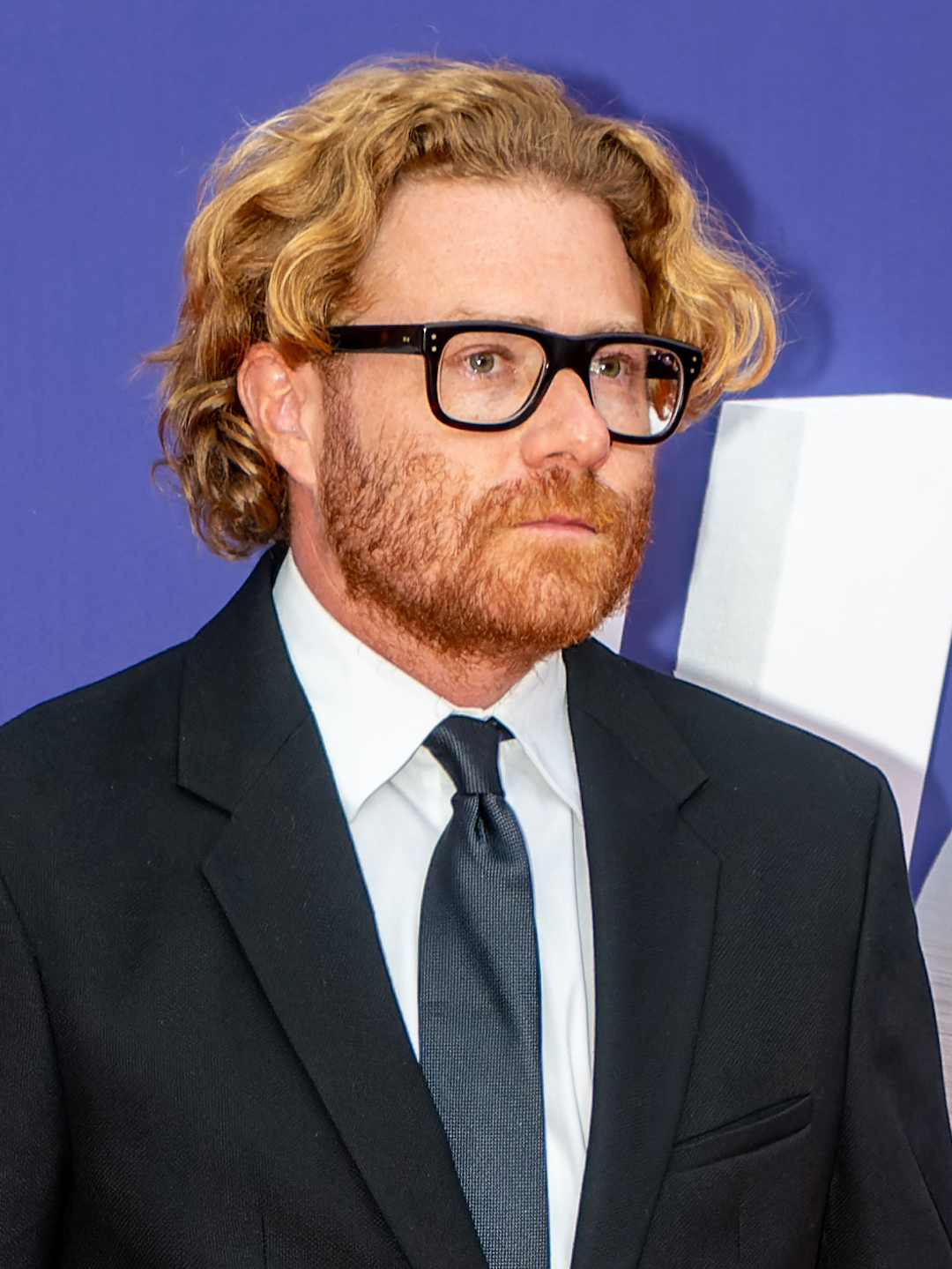
Erik Messerschmidt, Best Cinematography winner

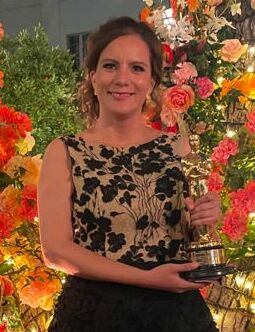
Michelle Couttolenc, Best Sound co-winner, holding her award during the ceremony

Winners are listed first, highlighted in boldface, and indicated with a double dagger (‡).

**Best Picture**: **Nomadland – Frances McDormand, Peter Spears, Mollye Asher, Dan Janvey and Chloé Zhao, producers**‡; The Father – David Parfitt, Jean-Louis Livi and Philippe Carcassonne, producers; Judas and the Black Messiah – Shaka King, Charles D. King and Ryan Coogler, producers; Mank – Ceán Chaffin, Eric Roth and Douglas Urbanski, producers; Minari – Christina Oh, producer; Promising Young Woman – Ben Browning, Ashley Fox, Emerald Fennell and Josey McNamara, producers; Sound of Metal – Bert Hamelinck and Sacha Ben Harroche, producers; The Trial of the Chicago 7 – Stuart Besser and Marc Platt, producers	**Best Directing**: **Chloé Zhao – Nomadland**‡; Thomas Vinterberg – Another Round; David Fincher – Mank; Lee Isaac Chung – Minari; Emerald Fennell – Promising Young Woman
**Best Actor in a Leading Role**: **Anthony Hopkins – The Father as Anthony**‡; Riz Ahmed – Sound of Metal as Ruben Stone; Chadwick Boseman – Ma Rainey's Black Bottom as Levee Green (posthumous nomination); Gary Oldman – Mank as Herman J. Mankiewicz; Steven Yeun – Minari as Jacob Yi	**Best Actress in a Leading Role**: **Frances McDormand – Nomadland as Fern**‡; Viola Davis – Ma Rainey's Black Bottom as Ma Rainey; Andra Day – The United States vs. Billie Holiday as Billie Holiday; Vanessa Kirby – Pieces of a Woman as Martha Weiss; Carey Mulligan – Promising Young Woman as Cassandra "Cassie" Thomas
**Best Actor in a Supporting Role**: **Daniel Kaluuya – Judas and the Black Messiah as Fred Hampton**‡; Sacha Baron Cohen – The Trial of the Chicago 7 as Abbie Hoffman; Leslie Odom Jr. – One Night in Miami... as Sam Cooke; Paul Raci – Sound of Metal as Joe; LaKeith Stanfield – Judas and the Black Messiah as William "Bill" O'Neal	**Best Actress in a Supporting Role**: **Yuh-jung Youn – Minari as Soon-ja**‡; Maria Bakalova – Borat Subsequent Moviefilm as Tutar Sagdiyev; Glenn Close – Hillbilly Elegy as Bonnie "Mamaw" Vance; Olivia Colman – The Father as Anne; Amanda Seyfried – Mank as Marion Davies
**Best Writing (Original Screenplay)**: **Promising Young Woman – Emerald Fennell**‡; Judas and the Black Messiah – Screenplay by Will Berson and Shaka King; story by Will Berson, Shaka King, Kenny Lucas and Keith Lucas; Minari – Lee Isaac Chung; Sound of Metal – Screenplay by Darius Marder and Abraham Marder; story by Darius Marder and Derek Cianfrance; The Trial of the Chicago 7 – Aaron Sorkin	**Best Writing (Adapted Screenplay)**: **The Father – Christopher Hampton and Florian Zeller; based on the play by Zeller**‡; Borat Subsequent Moviefilm – Screenplay by Sacha Baron Cohen, Anthony Hines, Dan Swimer, Peter Baynham, Erica Rivinoja, Dan Mazer, Jena Friedman and Lee Kern; story by Sacha Baron Cohen, Anthony Hines, Dan Swimer and Nina Pedrad; based on the character by Baron Cohen; Nomadland – Chloé Zhao; based on the book by Jessica Bruder; One Night in Miami... – Kemp Powers; based on his play; The White Tiger – Ramin Bahrani; based on the novel by Aravind Adiga
**Best Animated Feature Film**: **Soul – Pete Docter and Dana Murray**‡; Onward – Dan Scanlon and Kori Rae; Over the Moon – Glen Keane, Gennie Rim and Peilin Chou; A Shaun the Sheep Movie: Farmageddon – Richard Phelan, Will Becher and Paul Kewley; Wolfwalkers – Tomm Moore, Ross Stewart, Paul Young and Stéphan Roelants	**Best International Feature Film**: **Another Round (Denmark) in Danish – directed by Thomas Vinterberg**‡; Better Days (Hong Kong) in Mandarin – directed by Derek Tsang; Collective (Romania) in Romanian – directed by Alexander Nanau; The Man Who Sold His Skin (Tunisia) in Arabic – directed by Kaouther Ben Hania; Quo Vadis, Aida? (Bosnia and Herzegovina) in Bosnian – directed by Jasmila Žbanić
**Best Documentary (Feature)**: **My Octopus Teacher – Pippa Ehrlich, James Reed and Craig Foster** ‡; Collective – Alexander Nanau and Bianca Oană; Crip Camp – Nicole Newnham, Jim LeBrecht and Sara Bolder; The Mole Agent – Maite Alberdi and Marcela Santibáñez; Time – Garrett Bradley, Lauren Domino and Kellen Quinn	**Best Documentary (Short Subject)**: **Colette – Anthony Giacchino and Alice Doyard**‡; A Concerto Is a Conversation – Ben Proudfoot and Kris Bowers; Do Not Split – Anders Hammer and Charlotte Cook; Hunger Ward – Skye Fitzgerald and Michael Scheuerman; A Love Song for Latasha – Sophia Nahli Allison and Janice Duncan
**Best Short Film (Live Action)**: **Two Distant Strangers – Travon Free and Martin Desmond Roe**‡; Feeling Through – Doug Roland and Susan Ruzenski; The Letter Room – Elvira Lind and Sofia Sondervan; The Present – Farah Nabulsi and Ossama Bawardi; White Eye – Tomer Shushan and Shira Hochman	**Best Short Film (Animated)**: **If Anything Happens I Love You – Will McCormack and Michael Govier**‡; Burrow – Madeline Sharafian and Michael Capbarat; Genius Loci – Adrien Mérigeau and Amaury Ovise; Opera – Erick Oh; Yes-People – Gísli Darri Halldórsson and Arnar Gunnarsson
**Best Music (Original Score)**: **Soul – Trent Reznor, Atticus Ross and Jon Batiste**‡; Da 5 Bloods – Terence Blanchard; Mank – Trent Reznor and Atticus Ross; Minari – Emile Mosseri; News of the World – James Newton Howard	**Best Music (Original Song)**: **"Fight for You" from Judas and the Black Messiah – Music by H.E.R. and Dernst Emile II; lyrics by H.E.R. and Tiara Thomas**‡; "Hear My Voice" from The Trial of the Chicago 7 – Music by Daniel Pemberton; lyrics by Daniel Pemberton and Celeste Waite; "Husavik" from Eurovision Song Contest: The Story of Fire Saga – Music and Lyrics by Savan Kotecha, Fat Max Gsus and Rickard Göransson; "Io sì (Seen)" from The Life Ahead – Music by Diane Warren; lyrics by Diane Warren and Laura Pausini; "Speak Now" from One Night in Miami... – Music and Lyrics by Leslie Odom Jr. and Sam Ashworth
**Best Sound**: **Sound of Metal – Nicolas Becker, Jaime Baksht, Michelle Couttolenc, Carlos Cortés and Phillip Bladh**‡; Greyhound – Warren Shaw, Michael Minkler, Beau Borders and David Wyman; Mank – Ren Klyce, Jeremy Molod, David Parker, Nathan Nance and Drew Kunin; News of the World – Oliver Tarney, Mike Prestwood Smith, William Miller and John Pritchett; Soul – Ren Klyce, Coya Elliott and David Parker	**Best Production Design**: **Mank – Production design: Donald Graham Burt; set decoration: Jan Pascale**‡; The Father – Production design: Peter Francis; set decoration: Cathy Featherstone; Ma Rainey's Black Bottom – Production design: Mark Ricker; set decoration: Karen O'Hara and Diana Stoughton; News of the World – Production design: David Crank; set decoration: Elizabeth Keenan; Tenet – Production design: Nathan Crowley; set decoration: Kathy Lucas
**Best Cinematography**: **Mank – Erik Messerschmidt**‡; Judas and the Black Messiah – Sean Bobbitt; News of the World – Dariusz Wolski; Nomadland – Joshua James Richards; The Trial of the Chicago 7 – Phedon Papamichael	**Best Makeup and Hairstyling**: **Ma Rainey's Black Bottom – Sergio López-Rivera, Mia Neal and Jamika Wilson**‡; Emma – Marese Langan, Laura Allen and Claudia Stolze; Hillbilly Elegy – Eryn Krueger Mekash, Matthew Mungle and Patricia Dehaney; Mank – Gigi Williams, Kimberley Spiteri and Colleen LaBaff; Pinocchio – Mark Coulier, Dalia Colli and Francesco Pegoretti
**Best Costume Design**: **Ma Rainey's Black Bottom – Ann Roth**‡; Emma – Alexandra Byrne; Mank – Trish Summerville; Mulan – Bina Daigeler; Pinocchio – Massimo Cantini Parrini	**Best Film Editing**: **Sound of Metal – Mikkel E. G. Nielsen**‡; The Father – Yorgos Lamprinos; Nomadland – Chloé Zhao; Promising Young Woman – Frédéric Thoraval; The Trial of the Chicago 7 – Alan Baumgarten
**Best Visual Effects**: **Tenet – Andrew Jackson, David Lee, Andrew Lockley and Scott Fisher**‡; Love and Monsters – Matt Sloan, Genevieve Camilleri, Matt Everitt and Brian Cox; The Midnight Sky – Matthew Kasmir, Christopher Lawrence, Max Solomon and David Watkins; Mulan – Sean Faden, Anders Langlands, Seth Maury and Steve Ingram; The One and Only Ivan – Nick Davis, Greg Fisher, Ben Jones and Santiago Colomo Martínez

=== Jean Hersholt Humanitarian Awards ===
- Motion Picture & Television Fund – for the emotional and financial relief services it offers to members of the entertainment industry.
- Tyler Perry – for his active engagement with philanthropy and charitable endeavors in recent years, including efforts to address homelessness and economic difficulties faced by members of the African-American community.

=== Film awards and nominations ===
Films with multiple nominations
Nominations	Film
10	Mank
6	The Father
6	Judas and the Black Messiah
6	Minari
6	Nomadland
6	Sound of Metal
6	The Trial of the Chicago 7
5	Ma Rainey's Black Bottom
5	Promising Young Woman
4	News of the World
3	One Night in Miami...
3	Soul
2	Another Round
2	Borat Subsequent Moviefilm
2	Collective
2	Emma
2	Hillbilly Elegy
2	Mulan
2	Pinocchio
2	Tenet

Films with multiple wins
Awards	Film
3	Nomadland
2	The Father
2	Judas and the Black Messiah
2	Ma Rainey's Black Bottom
2	Mank
2	Soul
2	Sound of Metal

== Presenters and performers ==
The following individuals, listed in order of appearance, presented awards or performed musical numbers.

=== Presenters ===
Presenters
Name(s)	Role
Regina King	Presented the awards for Best Original Screenplay and Best Adapted Screenplay
Laura Dern	Presented the awards for Best International Feature Film and Best Supporting Actor
Don Cheadle	Presented the awards for Best Makeup and Hairstyling and Best Costume Design
Bryan Cranston	Presented the Jean Hersholt Humanitarian Award to the Motion Picture & Television Fund
Bong Joon-ho; Sharon Choi	Presented the award for Best Director
Riz Ahmed	Presented the awards for Best Sound and Best Live Action Short Film
Reese Witherspoon	Presented the awards for Best Animated Short Film and Best Animated Feature Film
Marlee Matlin; Jack Jason (interpreter)	Presented the awards for Best Documentary Short Subject and Best Documentary Feature
Steven Yeun	Presented the award for Best Visual Effects
Brad Pitt	Presented the award for Best Supporting Actress
Halle Berry	Presented the awards for Best Production Design and Best Cinematography
Harrison Ford	Presented the award for Best Film Editing
Viola Davis	Presented the Jean Hersholt Humanitarian Award to Tyler Perry
Zendaya	Presented the awards for Best Original Score and Best Original Song
Angela Bassett	Presented the "In Memoriam" tribute
Rita Moreno	Presented the award for Best Picture
Renée Zellweger	Presented the award for Best Actress
Joaquin Phoenix	Presented the award for Best Actor

=== Performers ===
Performers
Name	Role	Work
Molly Sandén	Performer	"Husavik" from Eurovision Song Contest: The Story of Fire Saga
Laura Pausini and Diane Warren	Performers	"Io sì (Seen)" from The Life Ahead
Celeste	Performer	"Hear My Voice" from The Trial of the Chicago 7
Leslie Odom Jr.	Performer	"Speak Now" from One Night in Miami...
H.E.R.	Performer	"Fight for You" from Judas and the Black Messiah

== Ceremony ==
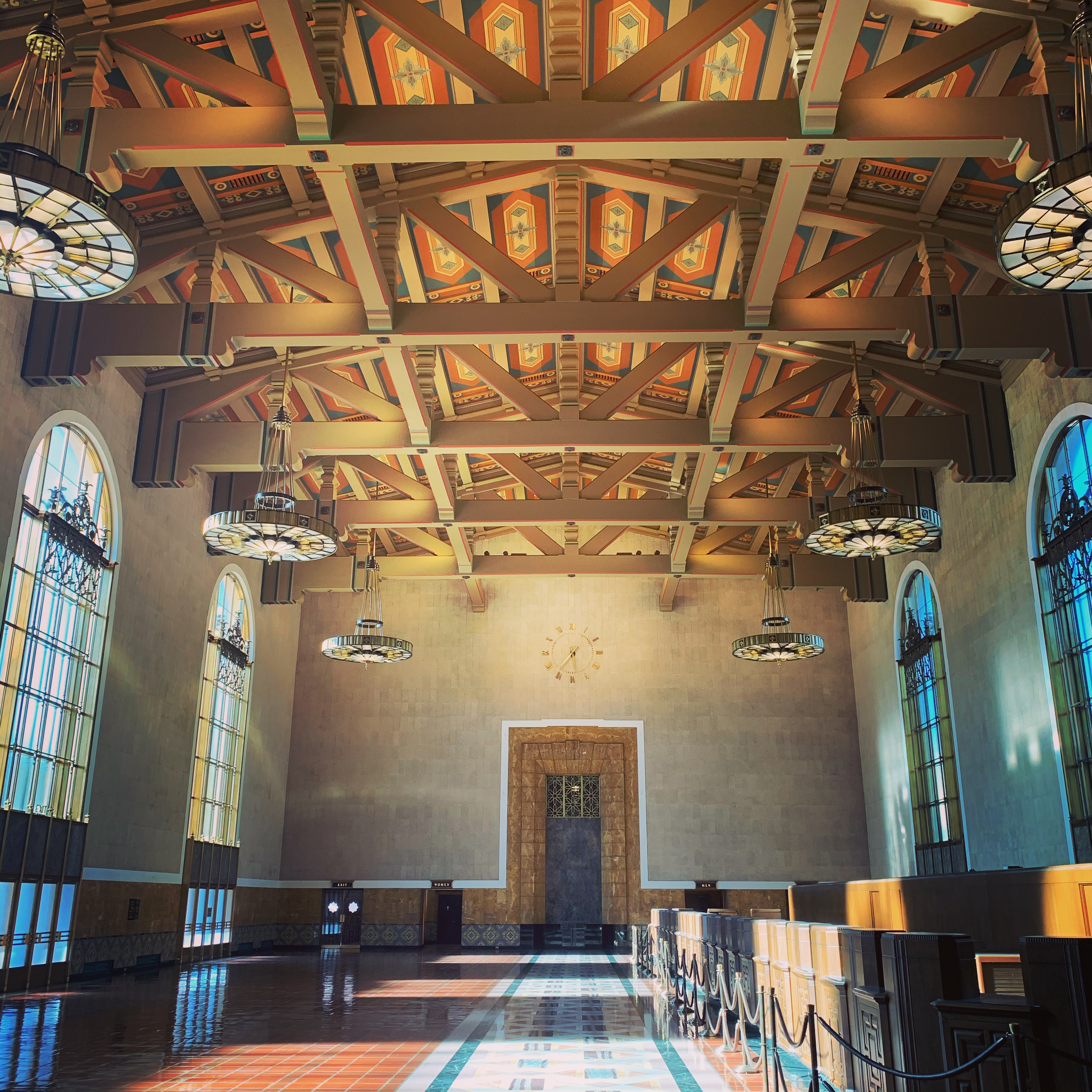
The original ticket lobby of Los Angeles Union Station, where the ceremony was held

In April 2017, the Academy scheduled the 93rd ceremony for February 28, 2021. But due to the effects of the COVID-19 pandemic on both cinema and television, the AMPAS Board of Governors changed the date to April 25. The annual Academy Governors Awards and corresponding nominees luncheon were canceled due to COVID-19 safety concerns. This marked the first time since the 60th ceremony held in 1988 that the awards were held in April. It was the fourth time in history that the ceremony was postponed from its original date (following the 10th ceremony in 1938, the 40th ceremony in 1968, and the 53rd ceremony in 1981).

In December 2020, the Academy hired television producer Jesse Collins, film producer Stacey Sher, and Oscar-winning director Steven Soderbergh to oversee production of the telecast. "The upcoming Oscars is the perfect occasion for innovation and for re-envisioning the possibilities for the awards show. This is a dream team who will respond directly to these times. The Academy is excited to work with them to deliver an event that reflects the worldwide love of movies and how they connect us and entertain us when we need them the most", said Academy president David Rubin and CEO Dawn Hudson.

The tagline for the ceremony, "Bring Your Movie Love", was intended to reflect "our global appreciation for the power of film to foster connection, to educate, and to inspire us to tell our own stories". In tandem with the theme, the Academy hired seven artists to create custom posters for the event inspired by the question "What do movies mean to you?" Another aspect of the telecast's production was to produce the ceremony as if it were a film, including promoting the presenters as a "cast", being filmed at the traditional cinematic frame rate of 24 frames per-second as opposed to 30, and using a cinematic aspect ratio rather than the standard 16:9 aspect ratio used by most television programming.

Because of the pandemic, AMPAS announced that the main ceremony would be held for the first time at Union Station in Downtown Los Angeles, with parts of the festivities at the Dolby Theatre in Hollywood, the ceremony's usual venue. To satisfy health and safety protocols, the Academy limited the number of people attending the gala to primarily nominees and presenters. Attendees were asked to submit travel plans to Oscar organizers before arriving in Los Angeles, take multiple COVID-19 tests, and isolate for ten days before the event. Guests were also asked to wear masks when the broadcast paused for commercial breaks. In consideration of overseas nominees unable to attend the ceremony, producers set up satellite "hubs", such as at BFI Southbank in London, where they could participate in the gala. Additionally, the five Best Original Song nominees were performed in previously recorded segments shown during the red carpet pre-show. Four of the songs were performed atop the Dolby Family Terrace of the Academy Museum of Motion Pictures; "Husavik" from Eurovision Song Contest: The Story of Fire Saga was performed on location in the song's namesake town in Iceland.

The Roots musician and The Tonight Show bandleader Questlove served as musical director for the ceremony. He, Oscars red carpet pre-show host Ariana DeBose, and actor Lin-Manuel Miranda presented trailers for the upcoming films Summer of Soul (...Or, When the Revolution Could Not Be Televised), West Side Story, and In the Heights, respectively, during the ceremony. Architect David Rockwell served as production designer for the show. In a press conference between the production team and reporters, Rockwell said Union Station's main lobby would be repurposed as the main setting for the awards presentation while adjacent outdoor areas would serve as patios for attendees before and after the ceremony. He also cited the Millennium Biltmore Hotel and The Hollywood Roosevelt Hotel, the latter of which was the venue of the inaugural Oscars ceremony, as inspirations for the design and staging of the festivities. Actors Colman Domingo and Andrew Rannells hosted Oscars: After Dark, a program airing immediately after the ceremony interviewing winners and nominees.

The ceremony offered accommodations for those who are deaf or visually impaired; it was the first Academy Awards to be broadcast with audio description for the visually impaired (carried via second audio program on the ABC telecast), which (along with its closed captioning) was sponsored by Google. A sign language interpreter was available in the media room. Deaf actress Marlee Matlin served as one of the award presenters, with her longtime partner Jack Jason interpreting her American Sign Language to spoken English.

=== Eligibility and other rule changes ===
Due to the date change, the Academy changed the eligibility deadline for feature films from December 31, 2020, to February 28, 2021. AMPAS president Rubin and CEO Hudson explained the decision to extend the eligibility period, saying: "For over a century, movies have played an important role in comforting, inspiring, and entertaining us during the darkest of times. They certainly have this year. Our hope, in extending the eligibility period and our Awards date, is to provide the flexibility filmmakers need to finish and release their films without being penalized for something beyond anyone's control."

The Academy also revised its release and distribution requirements by making films released via video on demand or streaming eligible for the awards as long as they were originally scheduled to have a theatrical release and were uploaded to AMPAS's online screening service within 60 days of their public release. AMPAS also amended its theatrical exhibition qualifying rules to allow films debuting in theaters in New York City, Chicago, the San Francisco Bay Area, Atlanta, and Miami to qualify for the awards in addition to venues in Los Angeles. A week of nightly screenings at a drive-in theater in the aforementioned cities also made films eligible for consideration.

Furthermore, the Academy made changes to specific award categories. The Best Sound Mixing and Best Sound Editing categories were combined into a single Best Sound category (which had existed from the 3rd Awards in 1930 through the 75th Awards in 2003) due to concerns from the Sound branch that the two categories had developed too much overlap in scope. The rules for Best Original Score were changed to require that a film's score include a minimum of 60% original music, with franchise films and sequels required to have a minimum of 80% new music. Finally, preliminary voting for Best International Feature Film was opened to all voting members of the Academy for the first time.

=== Best Actor announcement ending ===
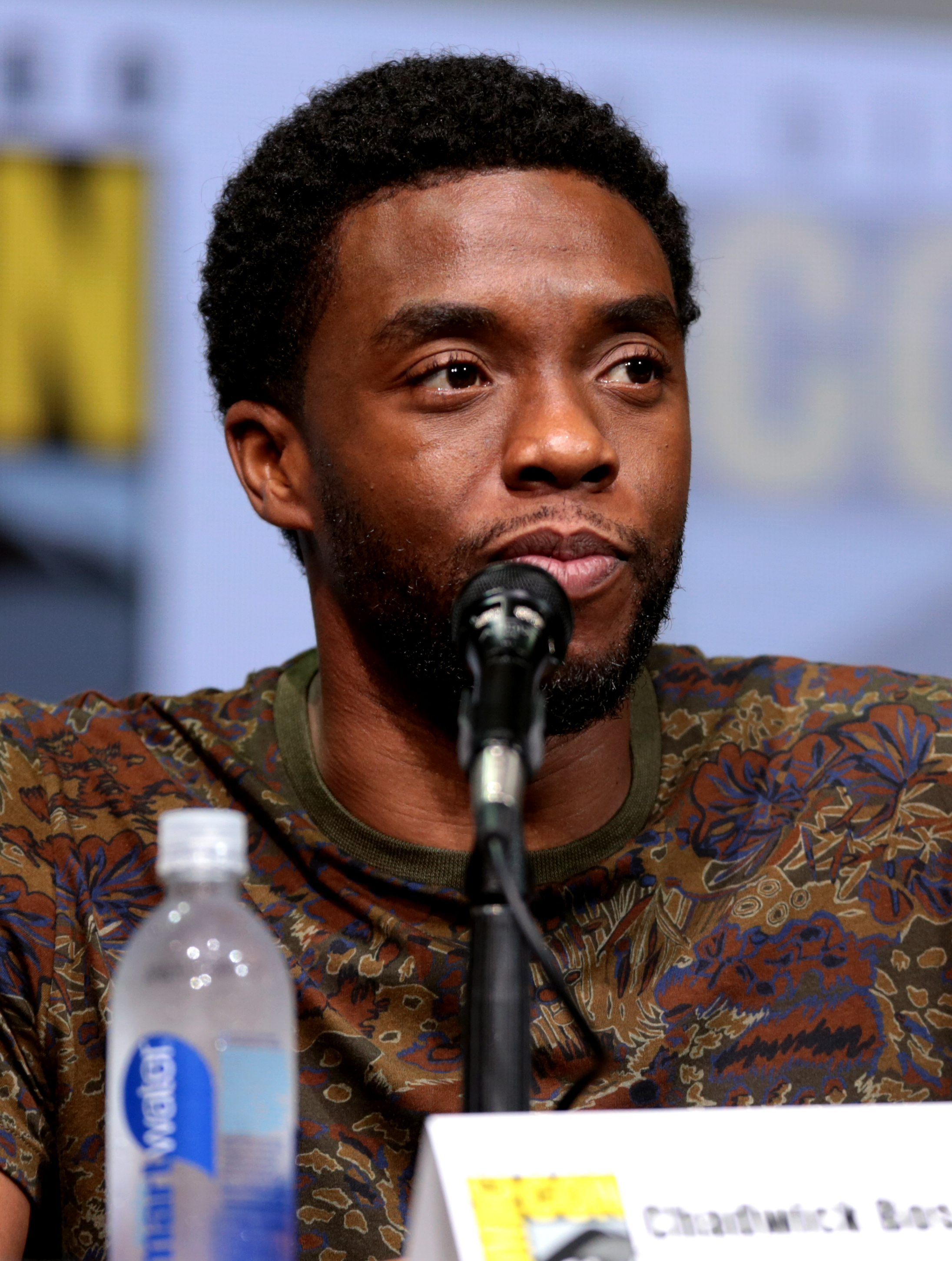
Many viewers and television critics believed Chadwick Boseman's impending win for Best Actor was a reason that producers saved the category as the last to be presented at the ceremony.

In a break with tradition, the lead acting categories were presented last after the awarding of Best Picture, with Best Actor coming last. This led many viewers to believe that the ceremony's producers were anticipating Chadwick Boseman posthumously winning Best Actor, which could have been accompanied by a tribute to the actor; Boseman had been considered a strong frontrunner for the award. When presenter Joaquin Phoenix announced that Anthony Hopkins was the winner, Phoenix said that the Academy accepted the award on behalf of Hopkins, who was not present, and the ceremony came to an abrupt end. It was later reported that Hopkins, who did not want to travel from his home in Wales, offered to appear via Zoom, but the producers declined his request.

The day after the ceremony, Hopkins released an acceptance speech on Instagram, in which he thanked the Academy, said that he "really did not expect" to win, and paid tribute to Boseman. The selection of Hopkins over Boseman was controversial, but Boseman's brother reported the family had no hard feelings toward the Academy.

In an interview, Soderbergh said that switching the traditional order of awards was planned before the nominations were announced, saying, "actors' speeches tend to be more dramatic than producers' speeches". He said that Boseman's widow accepting the award "would have been such a shattering moment" and "there would be nowhere to go after that". Soderbergh also defended the decision to not allow acceptance speeches via Zoom.

=== Critical reviews ===
Many media outlets received the broadcast negatively. On the review aggregator website Rotten Tomatoes, 24% of 34 critics' reviews are positive. The website's consensus reads: "The 93rd Oscars definitely delivered something different, but after a strong opening moment with Regina King, the changes to this year's ceremony cemented the importance of certain structural traditions -- and how damaging hedging your bets on the Academy's votes can be." Television critic Mike Hale of The New York Times wrote, "Sunday's broadcast on ABC was more like a cross between the Golden Globes and the closing-night banquet of a long, exhausting convention." He also commented, "The trade-off — whether because of the smaller crowd, the social distancing, or the sound quality in the cavernous space — was what felt like a dead room, both acoustically and emotionally. There were powerful and moving speeches, but they didn't seem to be generating much excitement, and when the people in the room aren't excited, it's hard to get excited at home." Rolling Stone columnist Rob Sheffield noted, "The most flamboyantly unplanned and half-assed Oscar Night in recent history was a grind from beginning to end." He also criticized the production of the "In Memoriam" segment saying that the montage was edited at an inappropriately fast pace. Kelly Lawler of USA Today commented, "While it was certainly challenging to stage the show safely, last month's Grammys proved that it is possible to make something entertaining and engaging amid the pandemic. Unfortunately, the Oscars producers seemingly missed that show. The Oscars were a train wreck at the train station, an excruciatingly long, boring telecast that lacked the verve of so many movies we love."

Others gave a more favorable review of the show. Time columnist Judy Berman wrote that the ceremony "was more entertaining than the average pre-COVID Oscars. It started out especially strong." She added, "Every part of this year's ceremony felt more intimate and less stuffy than just about any awards show I can remember. For once, the art and community of film seemed to take precedence over the business of film." Associated Press reporter Lindsey Bahr commented, "The 93rd Academy Awards wasn't exactly a movie, but it was a show made for people who love learning about movies. And it stubbornly, defiantly wasn't trying to be anything else." Darren Franich of Entertainment Weekly gave an average review of the telecast, but singled out the winners and presenters for providing memorable moments throughout the show.

=== Ratings and reception ===
The American telecast on ABC drew in an average of 10.4 million people over its length, which was a 56% decrease from the previous year's ceremony. The show also earned lower Nielsen ratings compared to the previous ceremony with 5.9% of households watching the ceremony. In addition, it garnered a lower rating among viewers between ages 18–49 with a 2.1 rating among viewers in that demographic. It earned the lowest viewership for an Academy Award telecast since figures were compiled beginning with the 46th ceremony in 1974. Moreover, the show did not make the list of the 100 most watched telecasts in the United States in 2021, while previous ceremonies usually ranked in the top ten. However, it was the most watched awards show of the season.

In July 2021, the ceremony presentation received four nominations for the 73rd Primetime Emmy Awards. Two months later, the ceremony won for Outstanding Production Design for a Variety Special (Alana Billingsley, Joe Celli, Jason Howard, and David Rockwell).

=== Censorship in China and Hong Kong ===
The ceremony was subject to various forms of censorship in China and its territories. Due to scrutiny over Nomadland director Chloé Zhao—a Chinese-American citizen who reportedly made comments critical of China in a 2013 interview with Filmmaker magazine—the ceremony telecast was pulled by its local rightsholders in the mainland, and all discussions of the ceremony were censored from Chinese social media and news outlets.

In addition, Hong Kong broadcaster TVB announced that the ceremony would not be shown live in the region for the first time since 1969. A TVB spokesperson told AFP that this was a "commercial decision". It was speculated that the decision was in retaliation for the nomination of Do Not Split, a documentary on Hong Kong's pro-democracy protests in 2019, for Best Documentary Short Subject.

== "In Memoriam" ==
The annual "In Memoriam" segment was presented by Angela Bassett. The montage featured the song "As" by singer Stevie Wonder.

- Cicely Tyson – actress
- Ian Holm – actor
- Max von Sydow – actor
- Cloris Leachman – actress
- Yaphet Kotto – actor
- Joel Schumacher – director
- Bertrand Tavernier – director
- Jean-Claude Carrière – writer, director
- Olivia de Havilland – actress
- Irrfan Khan – actor
- Michael Apted – director, producer
- Paula Kelly – actress
- Christopher Plummer – actor
- Allen Daviau – cinematographer
- George Segal – actor
- Wilford Brimley – actor
- Thomas Jefferson Byrd – actor
- Marge Champion – actress, dancer, choreographer
- Ron Cobb – production designer, concept artist
- Shirley Knight – actress
- José Luis Diaz – sound editor
- Kelly Preston – actress
- Rhonda Fleming – actress
- Kelly Asbury – director, writer, animator
- Fred Willard – actor
- Hal Holbrook – actor
- Kurt Luedtke – writer
- Linda Manz – actress
- Michael Chapman – cinematographer, director
- Martin Cohen – producer
- Kim Ki-duk – director, writer
- Helen McCrory – actress
- Ennio Morricone – composer
- Thomas Pollock – executive
- Carl Reiner – actor, writer, director, producer
- Larry McMurtry – writer
- Lynn Shelton – director
- Earl Cameron – actor
- Alan Parker – director, writer
- Mike Fenton – casting director
- Edward S. Feldman – producer
- Lynn Stalmaster – casting director
- Nanci Ryder – publicist
- Sumner Redstone – executive
- Rémy Julienne – stunt performer
- Stuart Cornfeld – producer
- Ronald L. Schwary – producer
- Jonathan Oppenheim – film editor
- Al Kasha – composer
- Charles Gordon – producer
- Brian Dennehy – actor
- Charles Gregory Ross – hairstylist
- Alberto Grimaldi – producer
- Johnny Mandel – composer
- Brenda Banks – animator
- George Gibbs – special effects
- Haim Shtrum – studio musician
- Lennie Niehaus – composer
- Leslie Pope – set decorator
- Joan Micklin Silver – director, writer
- Roberta Hodes – script supervisor, writer
- Ken Muggleston – set decorator
- Diana Rigg – actress
- Leon Gast – documentarian
- Anthony Powell – costume designer
- Chuck Bail – stunt performer
- Bhanu Athaiya – costume designer
- Colleen Callaghan – hairstylist
- Peter Lamont – production designer
- David Giler – writer, producer
- Norman Newberry – art director
- Zhang Zhao – executive, producer
- Conchata Ferrell – actress
- Alan Robert Murray – sound editor
- Andrew Jack – dialect coach
- Jonas Gwangwa – composer
- Marvin Westmore – makeup artist
- Pembroke Herring – film editor
- Lynda Gurasich – hairstylist
- Michel Piccoli – actor
- William Bernstein – executive
- Cis Corman – casting director, producer
- Michael Wolf Snyder – production sound mixer
- Ja'Net DuBois – actress
- Les Fresholtz – re-recording mixer
- Jerry Stiller – actor
- Earl "DMX" Simmons – songwriter, actor, producer
- Giuseppe Rotunno – cinematographer
- Else Blangsted – music editor
- Ronald Harwood – writer
- Masato Hara – producer
- Robert C. Jones – film editor, writer
- Walter Bernstein – writer, producer
- Sean Connery – actor
- Chadwick Boseman – actor

== See also ==
- List of television shows notable for negative reception
- List of submissions to the 93rd Academy Awards for Best International Feature Film
