= Matt Sloan =

Matt(hew) Sloan may refer to:

- Matt Sloan (visual effects), Australian special effects technician
- Matt Sloan (voice actor) (born 1973), American director, voice actor, and comedian
