= Love and Monsters (film) =

2020 film by Michael Matthews

- Theatrical release poster
- Directed by: Michael Matthews
- Screenplay by: Brian Duffield; Matthew Robinson
- Story by: Brian Duffield
- Produced by: Shawn Levy; Dan Cohen
- Starring: Dylan O'Brien; Jessica Henwick; Dan Ewing; Michael Rooker
- Cinematography: Lachlan Milne
- Edited by: Debbie Berman; Nancy Richardson
- Music by: Marco Beltrami; Marcus Trumpp
- Production companies: 21 Laps Entertainment; eOne Films
- Distributed by: Paramount Pictures (United States); Netflix (International)
- Release date: October 16, 2020
- Running time: 109 minutes
- Country: United States
- Language: English
- Budget: $30 million
- Box office: $1.1 million

Love and Monsters is a 2020 American monster adventure film directed by Michael Matthews, with Shawn Levy and Dan Cohen serving as producers. It stars Dylan O'Brien, Jessica Henwick, Dan Ewing and Michael Rooker.

Development began in 2012 as Monster Problems; the project lingered for six years until October 2018 when O'Brien and then Matthews joined the film. The rest of the cast joined over the next few months, and filming took place in Australia from March to May 2019.

Love and Monsters was originally going to receive a wide theatrical release by Paramount Pictures in March 2020. Due to the COVID-19 pandemic, the studio opted to release the film digitally via video on demand, and in select theaters, on October 16, 2020; the film's international release was handled by Netflix, which released the film on its service on April 14, 2021. The film received generally positive reviews from critics and was nominated for Best Visual Effects at the 93rd Academy Awards.

== Plot ==
The destruction of a large Earth-bound asteroid releases unknown chemicals. As a result, cold-blooded animals on Earth mutate into large monsters and kill off most of humanity. During the evacuation of Fairfield, Joel Dawson is separated from his girlfriend Aimee but promises to find her. However, a giant monster attacks their car, killing his parents.

Seven years later, Joel is part of a small survivor group living in an underground bunker. While the rest of the group fight monsters and seek supplies, Joel, who freezes up in dangerous situations, is relegated to kitchen and base maintenance duties. After a giant ant breaches his colony, killing one of the survivors, Joel decides to set off on a quest to reunite with Aimee, so that he doesn't end up alone. The rest of the group support his decision, handing him a map, equipment and supplies.

Passing through the suburbs, Joel is attacked by a giant toad but is saved by a stray dog named "Boy." The dog follows Joel on his journey, warning him against poisonous berries and other dangers. Joel falls into a nest of worm monsters called "sand gobblers", when two survivors, Clyde Dutton and Minnow, rescue him. They are heading north to the mountains, where fewer monsters live due to the colder weather and higher elevation. They teach Joel some basic survival skills, and that not all monsters are hostile. They invite Joel to join them, but he insists on continuing his journey to find Aimee. As they part ways, Clyde gives Joel a grenade.

Continuing west, Boy becomes trapped by a giant centipede monster. Joel freezes, but eventually saves Boy with his crossbow. Sheltering in an abandoned motel, they meet a robot named Mav1s. Before her battery dies, Mav1s powers his radio long enough for him to briefly contact Aimee. She tells him that other survivors have reached her colony, promising to lead them to safety. The next day Joel and Boy are attacked by a queen sand gobbler. They hide, but Boy barks, giving away their position. Joel kills the queen with the grenade, and yells at Boy for putting them in danger, causing Boy to run away. After swimming across a pond, Joel is covered in venomous leeches and hallucinates, but is rescued before he collapses.

Joel wakes to finally see Aimee. She leads a beach colony of elderly survivors who depend on her. He is introduced to the survivors, as well as Brooks "Cap" Wilkinson, a ship captain, and his crew, who had all recently arrived on a large yacht. As everyone celebrates their imminent departure, Aimee confesses to Joel that she is glad to see him, but that she has become a different person and is still mourning someone she was in love with. Crestfallen, Joel decides to return to his old base. He contacts his group on the radio and learns that it has become unsafe there, and that they too must leave. Cap sends Joel some berries to eat, which he recognizes as poisonous. Realizing Cap is not to be trusted, he rushes to warn Aimee but is knocked unconscious.

Joel, Aimee, and the rest of her colony awaken tied up on the beach. Cap reveals that his group are pirates that will raid the colony, and that their yacht is towed by a crab monster controlled with an electrified chain. Cap sets the crab to feed on the colonists, but Joel and Aimee escape and are able to fight for their lives, and Boy returns to help. After a lengthy battle, Joel has the opportunity to shoot the crab, but he realizes it is not hostile. Joel instead severs the electrified chain, freeing the crab. The creature leaves Joel and the others unharmed and instead sinks the yacht, devouring Cap and his crew.

Joel recommends to Aimee that she and her colony head north. They share a goodbye kiss, and Aimee promises she will find him. Joel treks all the way back to his colony, and they too decide to head to the mountains. On the radio, Joel inspires other colonies to take to the surface. As the colonies head north, Clyde and Minnow, already in the mountains, wonder if Joel will survive the next journey.

== Cast ==
- Dylan O'Brien as Joel, a survivor from Fairfield, California.
- Jessica Henwick as Aimee, Joel's girlfriend from before the apocalypse
- Michael Rooker as Clyde, a survival expert
- Dan Ewing as "Cap", a ship captain
- Ariana Greenblatt as Minnow, a survival expert who was adopted by Clyde
- Hero and Dodge as Boy, a dog
- Ellen Hollman as Dana, an associate of Cap
- Tre Hale as Rocko, an associate of Cap
- Pacharo Mzembe as Ray, a member of Joel's colony
- Senie Priti as Karen, a member of Joel's colony
- Amali Golden as Ava, a member of Joel's colony
- Te Kohe Tuhaka as Tim, a member of Joel's colony
- Tasneem Roc as Anna Lucia
- Thomas Campbell as Anderson
- Melanie Zanetti as Kala, and also the voice of Mav1s (Mavis), a robot
- Bruce Spence as "Old Pete"
- Hazel Phillips as Janice
- Andrew Buchanan as Joel's father
- Tandi Wright as Joel's mother

== Production ==
In June 2012, it was announced that Paramount Pictures was developing the film Monster Problems, with Shawn Levy producing, based on a spec script by Brian Duffield. It was described as a post-apocalyptic road movie in the vein of Mad Max and Zombieland with a John Hughes-esque love story.

In October 2018, it was announced that Dylan O'Brien was in talks to star, and that Michael Matthews was directing the film. By March 2019, Michael Rooker and Ariana Greenblatt had joined O'Brien. In April 2019, it was announced that Jessica Henwick had joined the cast. Also in April, Australian actor Dan Ewing joined the film in a supporting role. Principal photography started on the Gold Coast on March 25, 2019, and ended in May 2019.

Producer Shawn Levy said the film "benefited immensely" from the work of cinematographer Lachlan Milne, with whom he had previously worked on Stranger Things. Stunts were coordinated by Glenn Suter who had worked with O'Brien when he returned to complete the third Maze Runner film, after having experienced a serious accident during a stunt. The stunts were a challenge for Henwick because she had to work to look less competent, despite years of training for the Marvel television shows. The dogs were trained by Zelie Bullen, the main dog was called Hero, and his double was called Dodge.

The visual effects for the film were completed and managed by Mill Film and Moving Picture Company (MPC).

== Release ==
The film was originally slated for release on March 6, 2020, but in October 2019, the release date was moved to April 17, 2020. In February 2020, it was pushed back again, to February 12, 2021.

In August 2020, Paramount announced that due to COVID-19 pandemic the film would be released via video on demand on October 16, 2020. The film's title was changed from Monster Problems to Love and Monsters. The film also played in 387 theaters for the weekend of October 16–18, 2020. Netflix released the film on their service outside the US on April 14, 2021.

== Reception ==
=== Box office and video on demand ===
In its debut weekend, Love and Monsters was the number one most rented film on FandangoNow and Apple TV. It also played in 387 theaters alongside its video on demand (VOD) release, and grossed $255,000 in its opening weekend. In its second weekend, it finished second at Apple TV, third at Fandango, and eighth at Spectrum, then placed second at Spectrum, fifth at Fandango, and seventh at Google in its third weekend.

=== Critical response ===
On the review aggregator website Rotten Tomatoes, 94% of 116 critics' reviews are positive, with an average rating of 7.3/10. The website's consensus reads: "Led by a charming star turn from Dylan O'Brien, Love and Monsters peers into the apocalypse and finds an action-adventure with surprising emotional depth." Metacritic, which uses a weighted average, assigned the film a score of 63 out of 100, based on 14 critics, indicating "generally favorable" reviews.

Jessica Kiang of Variety called it: "A fun if forgettable family-friendly adventure comedy set in a 'monsterpocalypse'" and a "silly but satisfying hero's journey entirely unencumbered by importance." Kiang notes that the film is based on an original script but feels familiar as if it was adapted from existing material because it fits into the coming-of-age genre and references various other films such as I Am Legend, A Boy and His Dog, Zombieland, Tremors and Stand by Me. John DeFore of The Hollywood Reporter wrote: "The movie's last act offers complications both expected and surprising. For the most part, it satisfies, especially in what proves to be the pic's most elaborate action sequence." Indiewire's David Ehrlich wrote: "Love and Monsters is the rarest kind of movie these days: A fun, imaginative, genre-mashing adventure that was made with a modest amount of big studio money."

== Accolades ==
The film was nominated for an Academy Award in the Best Visual Effects category, but lost to Tenet. The nomination was given to Matt Sloan, Genevieve Camilleri, Matt Everitt, and Brian Cox. It was also nominated at the Critics' Choice Super Awards in the Best Science Fiction or Fantasy Movie category.
