= Matt Everitt (animator) =

Australian animator and visual effects artist

- Occupation(s): Animator, visual effects artist

Matt Everitt is an Australian animator and visual effects artist. He was nominated for an Academy Award in the category Best Visual Effects for the film Love and Monsters.

== Selected filmography ==
- Love and Monsters (2020; co-nominated with Matt Sloan, Genevieve Camilleri and Brian Cox)
