= Else Blangsted =

American music editor (1920–2020)

- Born: Else Siegel; 22 May 1920; Würzburg, Bavaria, Germany
- Died: 1 May 2020 (aged 99); Los Angeles, California USA
- Occupation: Music editor
- Spouse(s): Folmar Blangsted (1960-1982; his death); 1 child

Else Blangsted (née Siegel; 22 May 1920 – 1 May 2020) was a German-born Jewish American Holocaust survivor and cinematic music editor.

Her most notable films she participated in were Getting Straight (1970), The Front (1976), Meatballs (1979), Tootsie (1982), The Goonies (1985), The Color Purple (1985), Star Trek IV: The Voyage Home (1986), The Fabulous Baker Boys (1989), and The Bonfire of the Vanities (1990).

Blangsted was awarded a Golden Reel Award for career achievement.

== Personal life and death ==
Blangsted was born in Würzburg, Germany, the daughter of Lilly (Oppenheimer), a homemaker, and Siegmund Siegel, a horse trader.

Widowed in 1982, Blangsted died of natural causes at age 99 at her Los Angeles home. She was survived by two daughters, two grandchildren, and two great-grandchildren. Her elder daughter was born in Switzerland of a teenaged out-of-wedlock relationship. She was told the child had died only to learn in 1984 that the 48-year-old daughter was, in fact, alive, and had been adopted by a wealthy Swiss couple from Lausanne. Shortly after, Else fled Europe for the United States in 1937 to escape the scourge of Nazism.
