= Brian Cox (special effects artist) =

Australian special effects artist

- Occupation: Special effects artist

Brian Cox is an Australian special effects artist. He was nominated for an Academy Award in the category Best Visual Effects for the film Love and Monsters.

== Selected filmography ==
- Love and Monsters (2020; co-nominated with Matt Sloan, Genevieve Camilleri and Matt Everitt)
