= Opera (2020 film) =

- Directed by: Erick Oh
- Release date: 2020
- Running time: 9 minutes
- Countries: South Korea; United States

Opera is a 2020 South Korean/American animated short film by Erick Oh, who worked on Pig: The Dam Keeper Poems.

== Summary ==
A nonnarrative look at humanity (religion, class struggle, racism, war and terrorism) on a loop at a massive scale.

== Accolades ==
In 2021, it was nominated for an Academy Award for Best Animated Short Film.

== See also ==
- Minimalist film
- Independent animation
