= Genius Loci (film) =

- Release date: 2020
- Country: France
- Language: French

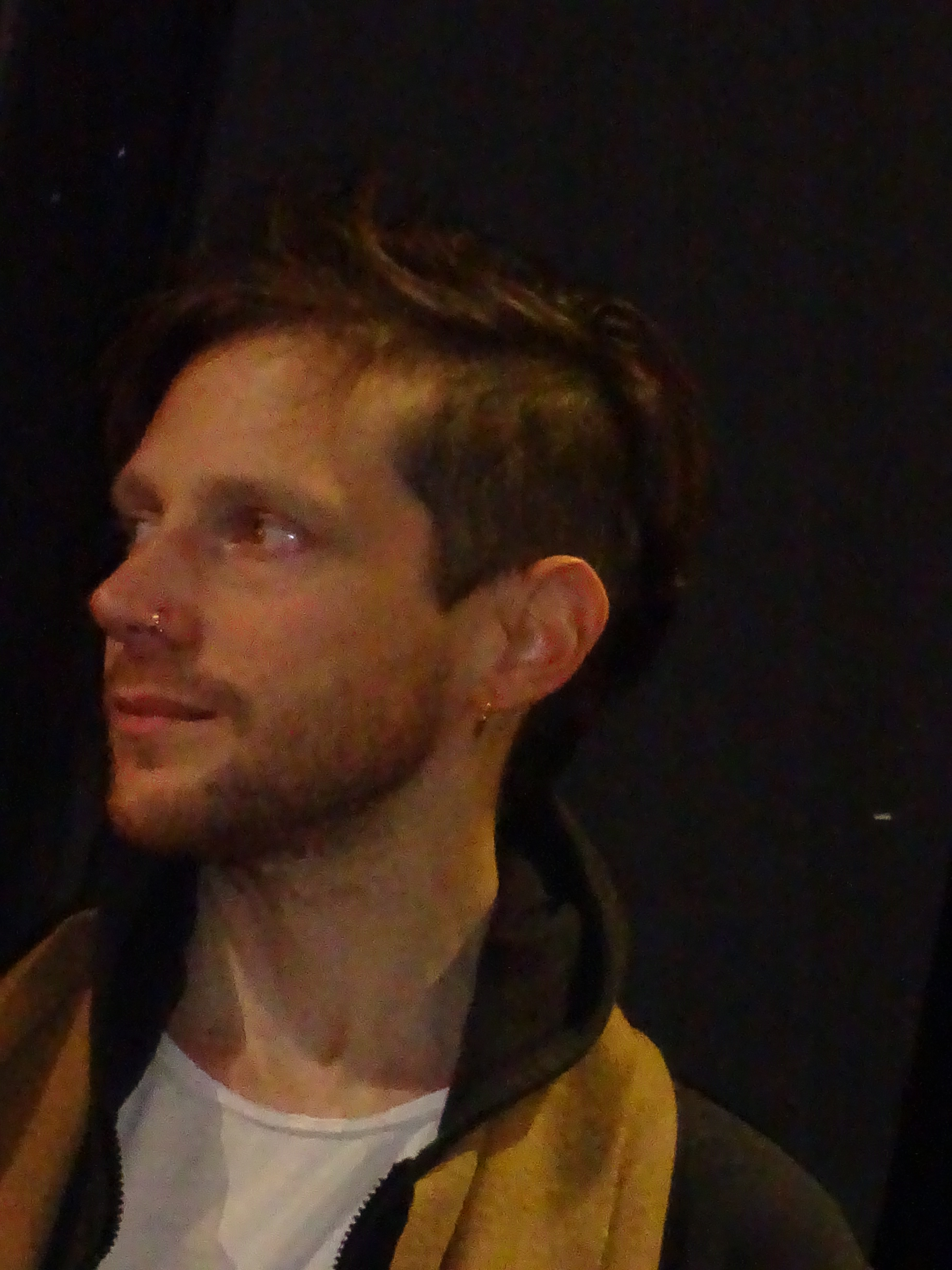
Adrien Mérigeau

Genius Loci is a 2020 French animated short film by Adrien Merigeau.

== Summary ==
Renee, a young loner, sees a mythical oneness beneath the urban chaos one night.

== Accolades ==
In 2021, it was nominated for an Academy Award for Best Animated Short Film.
