= Genevieve Camilleri =

Australian visual effects artist

- Occupation: Visual Effects Supervisor
- Website: https://www.gencamilleri.com/

Genevieve Camilleri is an Australian visual effects supervisor. She was nominated for an Oscar (Academy Award) in the category Best Visual Effects for the film Love and Monsters. Most recently she was the Production Visual Effects Supervisor on the horror film Together.

== Selected filmography ==
- Love and Monsters (2020; co-nominated with Matt Sloan, Matt Everitt and Brian Cox)
- Together (2025)
