= Ken Muggleston =

Set decorator

- Born: 24 April 1930; Sydney, Australia
- Died: 15 December 2020 (aged 90); Sydney, Australia
- Other name: Kenneth Muggleston
- Occupation: Set decorator
- Years active: 1967–1994

Ken Muggleston (24 April 1930 – 15 December 2020) was an Australian set decorator. He won an Academy Award in the category Best Art Direction for the film Oliver! Muggleston died on 15 December 2020.

== Selected filmography ==
- Oliver! (1968)
