= Matt Sloan (visual effects) =

Australian visual effects supervisor

- Occupation: Visual effects artist

Matt Sloan is an Australian visual effects supervisor. He was previously a special effects and animatronics technician.

== Early life ==
Sloan grew up on a farm. He studied geology in university.

== Career ==
Sloan got his start in the film industry as a "runner" and pyrotechnician for the special effects team of Fortress (1992) in 1991.

He began transitioning from special effects to visual effects around 2000.

As the filming for Star Wars: Episode II – Attack of the Clones and Star Wars: Episode III – Revenge of the Sith were moved to Australia, Sloan filled in for the role of Jedi Master Plo Koon due to financial practicality as he matched the height of the previous actor. He was the lead animatronics foreman for Episode II and was the droid unit technician for Episode III.

Sloan has worked as a technical director on Avatar (2009), The Avengers (2012), and The Hobbit (film series) for Weta Digital.

In 2013, he moved from Weta to 20th Century Fox, where he worked as a visual effects supervisor on the X-Men (film series) and The Martian (2015).
