= S. Craig Zahler =

American screenwriter and director (born 1973)

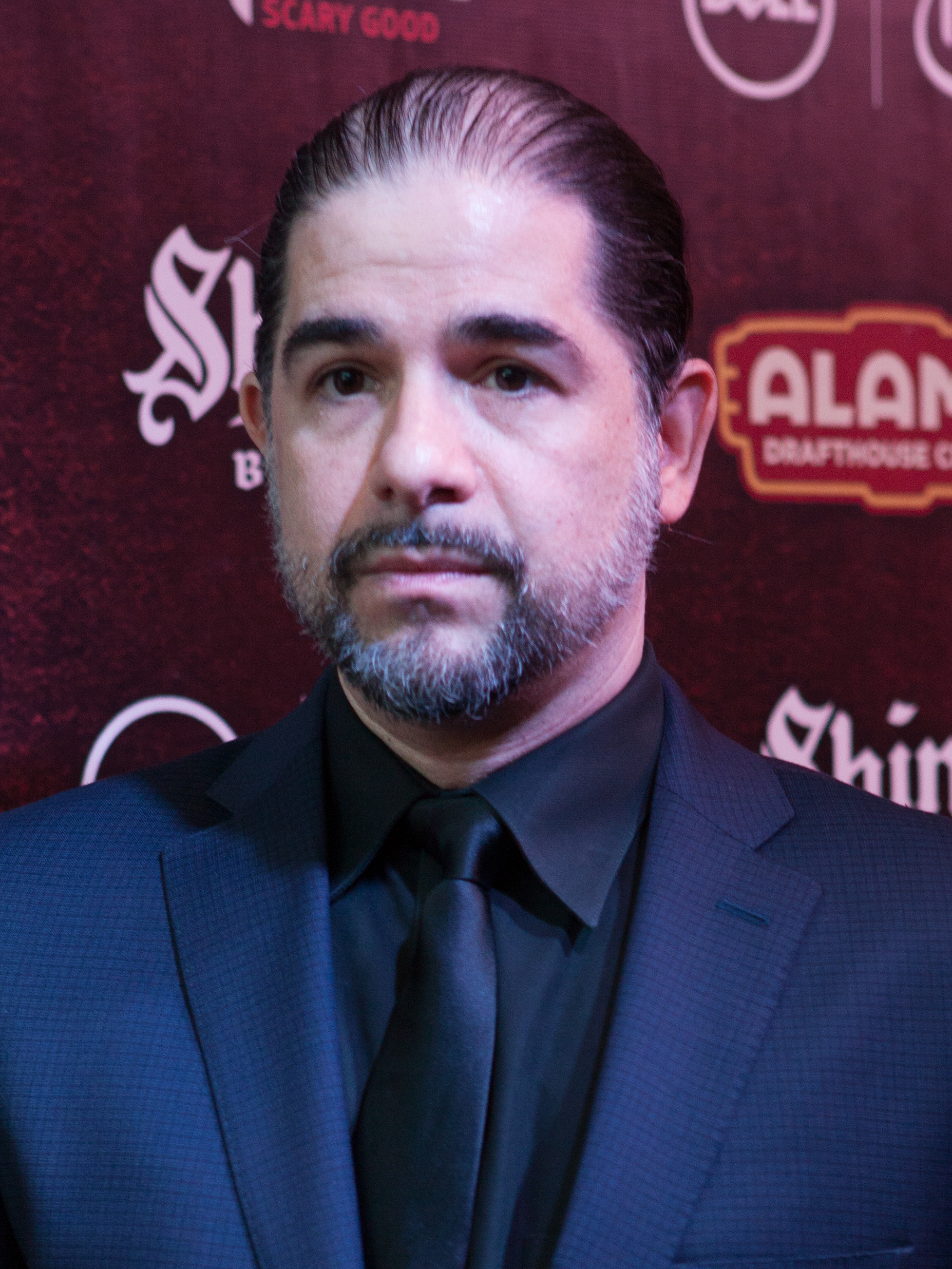
- Zahler in 2015
- Born: Steven Craig Zahler; January 23, 1973 (age 53); Miami, Florida, U.S.
- Other name: Czar
- Education: New York University
- Occupations: Screenwriter; film director; author; composer; cinematographer
- Years active: 1996–present

Steven Craig Zahler (born January 23, 1973) is an American screenwriter, director, novelist and composer. After beginning his career working briefly as a cinematographer, Zahler focused on screenwriting until he made his directorial debut with Bone Tomahawk (2015). He followed this up with Brawl in Cell Block 99 (2017) and Dragged Across Concrete (2018), all of which he wrote and composed the music for. He has also authored several novels and graphic novels.

== Early life and education ==
Zahler was born in Miami, Florida, to a Jewish family. He studied film at New York University.

== Career ==
His debut noir western novel, A Congregation of Jackals, was nominated for The Spur Award by the Western Writers of America and The Peacemaker Award by the Western Fictioneers. Corpus Chrome, Inc., A Congregation of Jackals and Mean Business on North Ganson Street all received starred reviews for excellence in Booklist.

As a drummer, lyricist and singer, Zahler, under the stage name Czar, collaborates with Jeff Herriott, as JH Halberd, to write and perform songs as the heavy metal band Realmbuilder, who have three albums on Swedish label I Hate Records. This is following Zahler's foray into black metal with the project Charnel Valley, for which he played drums, wrote lyrics and shared songwriting duties with Worm. The two Charnel Valley albums were released by Paragon Records.

Zahler also wrote the script for a 2011 horror film Asylum Blackout (also released as The Incident), which was directed by Alexandre Courtès.

In 2015, Zahler made his directorial debut, writing and directing the horror western Bone Tomahawk, which stars Kurt Russell, Patrick Wilson, Matthew Fox, Lili Simmons, David Arquette and Richard Jenkins. The film was released on October 23, 2015, in theaters and on video on demand. Bone Tomahawk was met with favorable reception, winning a few awards. At Rotten Tomatoes it has received positive reviews from 90% of critics. The New York Times called it a "witty fusion of western, horror and comedy that gallops to its own beat", while the LA Times said "There's a humming genre intelligence at work in the grim, witty horror-western Bone Tomahawk." The Hollywood Reporter called it a "handsome Western with horror overtones", and Variety described it as "...a most violent delight", while Leonard Maltin said "[T]his modest feature leaves The Hateful Eight in the dust. It's provocative, original, extremely violent and extremely good." Twitch Film said "[Bone Tomahawk] succeeds in demonstrating the voice of its massively talented creator." At the Sitges Film Festival Bone Tomahawk won the critic's award for "Best Picture", and Zahler was given the award for "Best Director". The Independent Spirit Awards nominated Richard Jenkins for "Best Supporting Actor" and S. Craig Zahler for "Best Screenplay". Kurt Russell won the "Best Actor" award at the Fangoria Chainsaw Awards.

Zahler's second feature film as writer, director, and co-composer was Brawl in Cell Block 99, which stars Vince Vaughn, Jennifer Carpenter, Udo Kier, and Don Johnson. This movie received its world premiere at the 74th Venice Film Festival in 2017. Actors Fred Melamed and Geno Segers both returned from his debut, and were joined by Marc Blucas, Mustafa Shakir, Thomas Guiry, Willie C. Carpenter, and others. The review aggregation website Rotten Tomatoes, the film has an approval rating of 92% based on 75 reviews, with an average rating of 7.3/10. The site's critical consensus reads, "Brawl in Cell Block 99 rides a committed Vince Vaughn performance into the brutally violent – and undeniably entertaining – depths of prison-set grindhouse genre fare." The movie made year end best of lists for Newsweek, (Justin Chang) L.A. Times, Collider, JoBlo.com, (Mike D'Angelo) The A.V. Club, and others. The picture was a New York Times Critics Pick and was screened at the Museum of Modern Art, where it was added to the permanent collection.

On February 1, 2017, Variety confirmed that Zahler would direct Dragged Across Concrete, a film about police brutality. The film stars Mel Gibson and Vince Vaughn, who previously worked together in the former's 2016 film Hacksaw Ridge. The film premiered at the 75th Venice International Film Festival on September 3, 2018, before receiving a release in the United States on March 22, 2019.

In 2018, it was announced that Zahler would be joining the writing staff of the resurrected Fangoria magazine.

On May 8, 2024, Variety confirmed that Zahler would write and direct The Bookie & the Bruiser, with Vince Vaughn and Adrien Brody set to star. In May 2025, it was announced that Theo James had replaced Brody. Filming began in Toronto on April 7, 2026.

On May 14, 2024, it was reported that Christian Gudegast would direct Empire State, based on Zahler's script Breaking the Empire State, with Gerard Butler set to star. By November 2025, Gudegast had been replaced by Michael Matthews, Hayley Atwell had joined the cast, and the project had been retitled Empire City. Filming began that month in Melbourne, with Bridger Nielson serving as the cinematographer. In January 2026, Omari Hardwick, Mel Jarnson, Tre Hale, Michael Beach, Dominic Bogart, Stephen Murphy, Jack DiFalco, and Kaiwi Lyman-Mersereau were reported to have joined the cast. Filming wrapped in late February 2026.

On October 29, 2024, it was reported that an adaptation of the 1961 Western novel Desert Stake-Out by Harry Whittington was in development, with Travis Mills directing, and Thomas Jane, Armie Hammer, William H. Macy, Myles Clohessy, Eli Brown, Eddie Spears, Zane Holtz, Jonah Kagen, and Mary Stickley joining the cast. Filming began on November 22, 2024, in Monument Valley and Prescott, Arizona, with Maxime Alexandre serving as the cinematographer and Ryan Masson replacing Kagen. No writer is credited for the film's screenplay, but Thomas Jane stated in an interview that the script was written by Zahler.

On April 24, 2026, it was again reported that Park Chan-wook would direct a film based on Zahler's script The Brigands of Rattleborge, rewritten by Park and proceeding under the new title The Brigands of Rattlecreek, with Matthew McConaughey, Austin Butler, Pedro Pascal and Tang Wei set to star.

=== Unproduced projects ===
On September 7, 2007, The Hollywood Reporter reported that Warner Bros. had acquired the film rights to the anime Robotech with Tobey Maguire attached to star in and produce the film, while Zahler was set to write the script.

On March 25, 2011, Sony's Columbia Pictures picked up the script of the film The Big Stone Grid, written by Zahler and produced by Michael De Luca. Michael Mann was reported to be directing in February 2012. In July 2016, Pierre Morel was announced to be replacing Mann as director.

On September 5, 2012, it was announced that FX was developing a martial arts drama, Downtown Dragons, with Zahler set to write and executive produce.

On June 27, 2013, Warner Bros. acquired the film rights to his crime novel Mean Business on North Ganson Street. He will write the script of the film which is set to star Leonardo DiCaprio and Jamie Foxx.

In 2015, Zahler told Creative Screenwriting, "I've had maybe a minimum of 21 different screenplays optioned or sold, and not one of them was made in Hollywood. I had one [The Incident] made by a French company in Belgium, but the other 20 or more – and some of those have been optioned multiple times, I had a television series that was at FX that went to Starz that went to AMC – none of them have been made."

On May 10, 2016, 20th Century Fox acquired the film rights to Zahler's western novel Wraiths of the Broken Land. The screenplay was to be written by Drew Goddard and the film directed by Ridley Scott.

== Personal life ==
Although he was raised Jewish, Zahler is an atheist.

Zahler's films have been accused of promoting right-wing agendas by some critics; despite this, he has stated that he is "not politically driven; I'm not very politically interested", believing in the philosophy of "art over politics."

Zahler is unmarried, stating that he has no interest in ever marrying.

== Bibliography ==
- A Congregation of Jackals (2010)
- Wraiths of the Broken Land (2013)
- Corpus Chrome, Inc. (2014)
- Mean Business on North Ganson Street (2014)
- The Narrow Caves (2017) (audiobook)
- Hug Chickenpenny: The Panegyric of an Anomalous Child (2018)
- The Slanted Gutter (2021)
- Forbidden Surgeries of the Hideous Dr. Divinus (2021) (graphic novel)
- Organisms from an Ancient Cosmos (2022) (graphic novel)

== Filmography ==
Feature film

Year	Title	Director	Writer	Composer	Notes
2011	Asylum Blackout	No	Yes	No	
2015	Bone Tomahawk	Yes	Yes	Yes	
2017	Brawl in Cell Block 99	Yes	Yes	Yes	
2018	Puppet Master: The Littlest Reich	No	Yes	No	
2018	Dragged Across Concrete	Yes	Yes	Yes	
2025	Frontier Crucible	No	Yes (Note: Uncredited)	No	
TBA	Empire City	No	Yes	No	Post-production
TBA	The Bookie & the Bruiser	Yes	Yes	TBA	Post-production
TBA	The Brigands of Rattlecreek	No	Yes	No	Pre-production

Short film cinematographer

- August Roads (1995)
- Warsaw Story (1996)
- Lucia's Dream (1997)
- Rooster (2003)

== Albums ==
As a metal musician, Zahler is better known by his stage name Czar. As a film score composer and as one half of the synthesizer duo Binary Reptile, he uses his real name.

Charnel Valley (Czar and Worm)

- The Dark Archives (2005, Paragon Records)
- The Igneous Race (2007, Paragon Records)

Realmbuilder (Czar and JH Halberd)

- Summon the Stone Throwers (2009, I Hate Records)
- Fortifications of the Pale Architect (2011, I Hate Records)
- Blue Flame Cavalry (2013, I Hate Records)

Jeff Herriott & S. Craig Zahler / Binary Reptile

- Bone Tomahawk (Original Motion Picture Soundtrack) (2015, Lakeshore Records)
- Crawl into the Narrow Caves (2017, Lakeshore Records) (as Binary Reptile)
- Brawl in Cell Block 99 (Original Motion Picture Soundtrack) (2017, Lakeshore Records)
- Dragged Across Concrete (Original Motion Picture Soundtrack) (2019, Lakeshore Records)

== Awards and nominations ==
Year	Award	Category	Film	Result
2016	Buenos Aires International Festival of Independent Cinema	Best Avant-Garde & Genre	Bone Tomahawk	Won
2016	Dublin Film Critics' Circle	Best Screenplay	Bone Tomahawk	5th Place
2019	Saturn Awards	Best Writing	Dragged Across Concrete	Nominated
