= Killer Whale (2026 film) =

- Theatrical release poster
- Directed by: Jo-Anne Brechin
- Written by: Jo-Anne Brechin; Katharine McPhee
- Produced by: Steve Jaggi; Kylie Pascoe; Lionel Hicks
- Starring: Virginia Gardner; Mel Jarnson; Mitchell Hope
- Cinematography: Shing-Fung Cheung
- Edited by: Ahmad Halimi
- Music by: Angela Little
- Production company: Jaggi Entertainment
- Distributed by: Lionsgate (United States); Rialto Distribution (Australia)
- Release date: January 16, 2026 (United States)
- Running time: 89 minutes
- Countries: United States; Australia
- Language: English

Killer Whale is a 2026 survival thriller film directed by Jo-Anne Brechin and written by Brechin and Katharine McPhee. The film stars Virginia Gardner, Mel Jarnson, and Mitchell Hope. The plot follows two best friends who find themselves trapped in a remote lagoon with a vengeful orca.

The film was released theatrically in the United States by Lionsgate on January 16, 2026.

== Plot ==
Maddie, a talented cellist, is struggling to recover from a tragedy in which her friend Chad died protecting her during a robbery. A gun misfire during the robbery also left Maddie with hearing loss for which she uses hearing aids. To help her heal, her best friend Trish, a PhD student studying gene editing and social media influencer, surprises her with a luxury vacation to Thailand.

After showing off her waterproof phone, Trish encourages Maddie to visit a local attraction featuring Ceto, a captive orca. Disapproving of the captivity, Maddie refuses to support the venue financially. Instead, the pair, accompanied by an immigrant named Josh, get drunk later in the night and break into Ceto's water park. Maddie is pleased to meet her through a viewing window, but is horrified when a janitor falls into the tank and Ceto kills him. The trio flees, while the park management decides to get rid of Ceto by releasing her into the ocean.

The next morning, the trio decide to explore a secluded atoll lagoon demarcated by a sea stack, which locals say is haunted. Their excursion turns into a nightmare when Josh and Trish, who were riding a jet ski, are ambushed by Ceto, who kills Josh while Trish manages to reach Maddie's inflatable. The women start paddling to reach an islet, but are forced to swim the rest of the way. Climbing the rock, Maddie pierces her foot and Trish slashes her leg. The pair deduce that Ceto is attacking them because she has become confused after accidentally swimming into the lagoon's perimeter of rocks, and (thinking she is still held captive) cannot distinguish them from her former CetoWorld trainers.

In order to survive the next days, the pair eat gum and an oyster, and drink water from a sun-stroked plastic bag. They also call out for a nearby boat and reach out to Josh's arm to get his mini flashlight and make signals at night.

Thinking she might not survive, Maddie drops Chad's cremation stone into the water. Overcome by guilt, Trish confesses to Maddie that it was she who planned the robbery to pay her placement debt, even though she didn't mean for the robber to be armed, for Maddie to lose her hearing, or for Chad to die. Enraged, Maddie ignores Trish until the next day, when Trish realizes that if she can swim to shore, she can distract Ceto enough for Maddie to reach another islet near the perimeter. Their plan is successful, and while a plane flies over them, Trish makes an SOS sign on the sand. Unfortunately, while she is distracted, Ceto bites off her leg, and she bleeds out.

At night, Maddie's hearing aids run out of battery, leaving her unable to hear. Maddie sees and speaks to Ceto and then makes the decision to swim to the perimeter. Ceto does not attack Maddie this time, and Maddie successfully reaches the sand bank. There, she buries Trish. Then, she sets off to look for Trish's bag with the waterproof phone. She finds the phone, but it shuts off and Ceto approaches again. Maddie retrieves her cello endpin and stabs Ceto in the eye. Ceto swims away, whimpering. After floating in the water for some time, Maddie is rescued by a helicopter. Months later, Maddie performs a cello piece and there is one empty seat in the audience.

== Cast ==
- Virginia Gardner as Maddie, an aspiring cellist recovering from a personal tragedy.
- Mel Jarnson as Trish Stevens, Maddie's best friend and a scientist.
- Mitchell Hope as Josh, an expat who joins the friends on their trip.
- Isaac Crawley as Chad, Maddie's deceased friend and crush.
- Ron Smyck as Khwan, a security guard at the water park.
- Aliandra Calabrese as Chelsea, Ceto's trainer
- Mia Grunwald as Dana, Ceto's trainer
- Shinji Ikefuji as a janitor at the water park
- Scott James George as a robber

== Production ==
=== Development ===
The film was produced by Australian production house Jaggi Entertainment. It was directed by Jo-Anne Brechin, with a screenplay co-written by Brechin and Katharine McPhee.

== Filming ==
Principal photography took place in Queensland, Australia utilising both location shooting and water tanks for the aquatic sequences. Cinematography was handled by Shing-Fung Cheung. The Orca was manufactured by Formation Effects with 3D sculptor John Chen. No real animals were included in the film's credits.

== Reception ==
On the review aggregator website Rotten Tomatoes, 16% of 32 critics' reviews are positive. The website's consensus reads: "Larded up with too much blubber and not enough bite to justify the tedium, this disappointing survival thriller is beached upon arrival."

Chad Collins of Dread Central gave the film 3/5 stars, saying it "has a killer aquatic horror premise, but an uneven tone keeps it from monster movie greatness." Meagan Navarro of Bloody Disgusting gave the film a score of 1.5/5, writing, "If you've seen 47 Meters Down or Lionsgate's Fall, which also stars Killer Whale's Virginia Gardner, this straightforward aquatic thriller adheres to the exact same formula with very little in the way of deviations."
