= The Bookie & the Bruiser =

Upcoming film by S. Craig Zahler

- Directed by: S. Craig Zahler
- Written by: S. Craig Zahler
- Produced by: Anthony Katagas; Dave Caplan
- Starring: Vince Vaughn; Theo James; Fred Melamed; Patrick Schwarzenegger; Paul Ben-Victor
- Cinematography: Benji Bakshi
- Production company: Keep Your Head Productions
- Country: United States
- Language: English

The Bookie & the Bruiser is an upcoming American crime drama film written and directed by S. Craig Zahler. It stars Vince Vaughn, Theo James, Fred Melamed, Patrick Schwarzenegger, and Paul Ben-Victor.

== Premise ==
In 1959, New York, a Jewish man named Rivner and an Italian-American named Boscolo from the Lower East Side, both veterans from World War II, partner up as a bookmaker and an enforcer to create an illicit gambling operation, wedging themselves between a powerful Irish gang and the Mafia.

== Cast ==
- Vince Vaughn as Boscolo
- Theo James as Rivner
- Fred Melamed as Luca Cavicci
- Patrick Schwarzenegger as Augie / Bernard
- Paul Ben-Victor as Generale Francesco Viscuzo

== Production ==
In May 2024, at the Cannes Film Festival, the film was announced to be in pre-production, with C2 Motion Picture Group financing it and an expected start date for principal photography later in the year. In August, Vince Vaughn teased that filming would begin either in late 2024 or early 2025. In May 2025, Theo James joined the cast, replacing Adrien Brody in the role. Fred Melamed joined the cast in April 2026. Patrick Schwarzenegger joined the cast in May 2026, playing the twins Augie and Bernard. In August, Paul Ben-Victor joined the cast as Generale Francesco Viscuzo.

Principal photography began in Toronto on April 7, 2026, under the ruse title Christmas Mysteries, and was scheduled to wrap on May 21. Benji Bakshi served as the cinematographer. Filming also took place at the historic Parkwood Estate in Oshawa, Ontario in mid May.
