= Michael Matthews (director) =

International Filmmaker

- Born: Durban, South Africa
- Education: CityVarsity
- Years active: 2009–present

Michael Matthews is a South African born filmmaker, known for his films Five Fingers for Marseilles (2017) and Love and Monsters (2021).

== Early life ==
Matthews was born in Durban. He studied filmmaking at the CityVarsity Cape Town campus.

== Career ==
In 2017, he directed Five Fingers for Marseilles, a film dubbed as South Africa's first Western film. He won the best director award and the film won in best film category at 14th Africa Movie Academy Awards. He was also nominated for Best Achievement in Directing - Feature Film at 2017 South African Film and Television Awards.

For his role in the production of Apocalypse Now Now, a 2018 short film based on the book of same name, Matthews won best short film at the 12th South African Film and Television Awards.

Matthews directed the 2021 Oscar-nominated American monster adventure film, Love and Monsters, with Shawn Levy and Dan Cohen serving as producers.

In October 2021, Matthews joined as director for the upcoming Disney film Merlin.

Matthews was hired as director of Nautilus, a 2024 Disney+ series, in November 2021.

Matthews' next film is Empire City with Gerard Butler and Hayley Atwell. The script is written by Brian Tucker and S. Craig Zahler. Matthews will next direct a film adaptation of the video game Home Safety Hotline in 2027.

== Filmography ==
Short film

Year	Title	Director	Producer
2009	Wideopen	Yes	Yes
2010	Sweetheart	Yes	Yes
2018	Apocalypse Now Now	Yes	Yes

Feature film

Year	Title	Director	Producer	Writer
2017	Five Fingers for Marseilles	Yes	Yes	Story
2020	Love and Monsters	Yes	No	No
TBA	Empire City	Yes	No	No

Television

- Nautilus (2024) (4 episodes)
