= Joseph Kennedy (actor) =

British actor, singer and musician

- Born: Joseph Wilson; 1 November 1981 (age 44); Oxford, England, United Kingdom
- Occupations: Actor, musician
- Father: John Bowe

Joseph Kennedy (born Joseph Wilson, 1 November 1981 in Oxford) is an English actor, singer and musician.

== Early life and education ==
Kennedy is the son of fellow actor John Bowe. He was educated at Dragon School and then Abingdon School from 1995 to 2000 where he appeared in the productions Jesus Christ Superstar and Sweeney Todd. After having obtained the equivalent of a bachelor's degree in France, he joined the Central School of Speech and Drama in London.

== Acting ==
In 2008 he played the role of the assassin Carter, in the British television programme TV series Robin Hood, the character Carter was killed by the Sheriff of Nottingham at the end of season 2 in episode 13. Episode 8 "Get Carter!" was named after his character.

More recently he appeared in the films The Incident and The Grind, and in 2014 played the character Will Scarlet in the Doctor Who episode "Robot of Sherwood".

In 2016 he appeared in Brimstone, directed by Martin Koolhoven.

In 2023, he appeared as Dr. Weathers in BBC One miniseries Boat Story.

== Solomon Grey ==
Kennedy co-created a band called Captive State in London, alongside Tom Bootle, before forming a band with Tom Kingston called Solomon Grey, which was signed by Mercury KX in 2015.

In 2017 Solomon Grey created the music for the BBC drama The Last Post and The Casual Vacancy, a TV adaptation of JK Rowling's novel.

He is also involved in the project Bess who did one of the songs for Back to Life, another series for which Solomon Grey provided the music.

== Career ==
=== Filmography ===
- 2006: Housewife, 49 (TV film): James Wenchurch
- 2006: Where the Heart Is: Johnny (TV, 1 episode)
- 2006: Do not Look Back in Anger (TV, 2 episodes) Johnny
- 2006: Midsomer Murders: Roland Marwood (TV, 1 episode)
- 2006: Four Funerals and a Wedding (TV): Roland Marwood
- 2006: Bobby Moore (Telefilm): Bobby Moore (Lead)
- 2008: Robin Hood: Carter (TV, 2 episodes)
- 2009: Trial & Retribution: Sebastian (TV, 1 episode)
- 2009: Siren (Part 1); (TV): Sebastian
- 2010: Baseline (film): Jack
- 2010: Sex & Drugs & Rock & Roll (film): Davey Payne
- 2011: Women in Love (TV series) (TV, 1 episode, season 1): Anton Skrebensky
- 2011: The Grind (film): Barry
- 2011: The Incident (film): Ricky
- 2012: Gozo (film): Joe
- 2012: Subculture (film): Darryl
- 2014: Doctor Who: Will Scarlet (TV, 1 episode)
- 2016: Brimstone by Martin Koolhoven
- 2023: Boat Story: Dr. Weathers

=== Theatre ===
- 2004: Twelfth Night; Sebastian
- 2005: Julius Caesar
- 2007: Europe
- 2008: Riflemind

== See also ==
- List of Old Abingdonians
