= Paul Ben-Victor =

American actor (born 1958 or 1959)

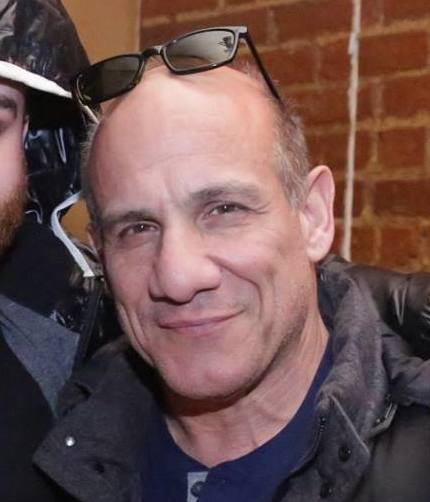
- Ben-Victor in 2016
- Born: 1958 or 1959 (age 66–67); New York City, U.S.
- Education: Carnegie Mellon University
- Occupation: Actor
- Years active: 1987–present

Paul Ben-Victor (born 1958 or 1959) is an American actor. He is best known for playing Greek mobster Spiros "Vondas" Vondopoulos on the HBO drama series The Wire, Alan Gray in Entourage (2005–2008), Ray in Body Parts (1991) and recently as Antaan in the DC Universe superhero crime neo-Western thriller series Lanterns.

== Early life and education ==
Ben-Victor was born in New York City, the son of photographer Victor Friedman and playwright Leah Kornfeld Friedman. Organizational psychologist Stew Friedman is his brother. He is Jewish. He grew up in Flatbush, Brooklyn, where he attended Midwood High School before graduating from Carnegie Mellon University in Pittsburgh, where he studied theater.

== Career ==
After attending Carnegie Mellon University, he made his theater debut at the Nuyorican Poets Cafe on New York's lower east side with Miguel Pinero and Reinaldo Povod. Ben-Victor debuted on the small screen in 1987 in the television film Blood Vows: The Story of a Mafia Wife and on an episode of Cagney & Lacey. He has been featured on many television cop dramas like FBI, Monk and CSI, and also had a recurring role as two-bit con man Steve Richards on three episodes of NYPD Blue from 1994 to 1997. He also appeared as Steve Richards on a 1998 episode of the short-lived police drama Brooklyn South.

Ben-Victor had a starring role in the Sci-Fi Channel television show The Invisible Man, alongside Vincent Ventresca. The two later guest starred together on the hit TV show Las Vegas. They were reunited again on an episode of the new USA Network series In Plain Sight ("Hoosier Daddy"), on which Ben-Victor has a supporting role. He was cast in important roles on HBO dramas The Wire (as mobster Spiros "Vondas" Vondopoulos) and Entourage, as well as making a 2006 appearance as Coach Lou on My Name Is Earl. He portrayed Moe Howard in the 2000 television film The Three Stooges. He had roles in the films The Irishman (2019), The Banker (2020), and Last Looks (2022).

Ben-Victor has co-written stage plays with his mother, including Club Soda and The Good Steno.

== Filmography ==
=== Film ===
Year	Title	Role	Notes
1987	Pass the Ammo	Eddie DePaul	
1988	Assault of the Killer Bimbos	Customer	
1989	Wired	Tom Perino	
1990	Streets	Officer #2	
1990	The Rookie	Felix 'Little Felix'	
1991	Body Parts	Ray Kolberg	
1991	Alone	Al	Short
1992	Cool World	Valet	
1992	Eyes of the Beholder	Dr. Medaris	
1992	Soulmates	Driver	
1993	Trouble Bound	Zand	
1993	Extreme Justice	Councilman Joe Taylor	
1993	True Romance	Luca	
1993	Dream Lover	Clown	
1993	Tombstone	Florentino 'Indian Charlie' Cruz	
1994	Red Scorpion 2	Vince D'Angelo	
1995	Houseguest	Pauly Gasperini	
1995	Toughguy	Sol Lipsteiger	
1995	Bushwhacked	Dana's Father	
1995	The Fifteen Minute Hamlet	Various Roles	Short
1996	Firestorm	Duran	
1996	Maximum Risk	FBI Agent Pellman	
1997	Metro	Clarence Teal	
1997	The 6th Man	Bernie	
1998	Standoff	Hank McGill	
1998	Point Blank	Howard	
1998	Heist	Abbie	
1998	A Civil Action	Bobby Pasqueriella	
1999	The Corruptor	FBI Agent Pete Schabacker	
1999	Crazy in Alabama	Mackie	
1999	Kiss Toledo Goodbye	Vince	
2000	Drowning Mona	Deputy Tony Carlucci	
2000	Gun Shy	Howard	
2000	Very Mean Men	Jimmy D.	
2001	The Cure for Boredom	Rudy	
2001	Choosing Matthias	Chase	
2002	Niche	Spike	Short
2003	Daredevil	Jose Quesada	
2004	Woman at the Beach	Pablo	Short
2006	Push	Toni	
2007	Randy and the Mob	Franco	
2007	Naked Under Heaven	Ben	
2008	On the Doll	Jimmy Sours	
2008	Joe Mover	The Boss	Short
2008	Player 5150	Jimmy	
2008	Ten: Thirty One	Gerry	Short
2008	Coma	-	Short
2009	Anytown	Principal Wheeler	
2009	This Monday	Tony	Short
2009	Clear Lake, WI	Sheriff Joe Dietzer	
2010	A Reuben by Any Other Name	Max	Short
2010	Venus & Vegas	Carlo	
2010	The Blue Wall	Charlie Sullivan	Short
2011	Video Girl	Jermaine Stanford	
2011	Poolboy: Drowning Out the Fury	Kip Tippington	
2012	FDR: American Badass!	Mussolini	
2012	The Carrier	Vlade	Short
2012	Should've Been Romeo	Joey	
2012	Mighty Fine	Bobby	
2012	Desperate Endeavors	Bill Loney	
2013	Don Jon	Priest	
2013	Empire State	Tommy	
2013	Once Upon a Time in Queens	Vinnie Nero	
2013	Grudge Match	Lou Camare	
2014	By the Gun	Vincent Tortano	
2014	Friends and Romans	Dennis Socio	
2015	Get Hard	Gayle	
2015	Any Day	William	
2016	Love Is All You Need?	Principal Birdsell	
2016	Goliath	Cleft Chin	Short
2016	Blowtorch	Blackie	
2017	Camera Store	Mr. Bibideaux	
2017	His Lover	Scotty Davidson Jr.	Short
2017	A Crooked Somebody	Detective Zimmer	
2017	The Super	Mr. Johnson	
2018	Monster	Anthony Petrocelli	
2018	Feast of the Seven Fishes	Johnny	
2018	The Amityville Murders	Ronnie DeFeo, Sr.	
2019	The Irishman	Jake Gottlieb	
2019	Adventure Force 5	Executive Victor	
2020	The Banker	Donald Silverthorne	
2020	Allagash	Bill	
2020	My Brothers' Crossing	Officer Byrd	
2021	On Our Way	Mr. Adler	
2022	Last Looks	Lieutenant Pete Conady	
2022	Collide	Clyde	
2022	Emancipation	Major G. Halstead	
2023	Plane	Hampton	
2023	The Collective	Miro Lindell	
2024	Another Day in America	Hampton	
2024	Murder at Hollow Creek	Jeff Rhodes	
2025	Flight Risk	Director Coleridge (voice)	
2025	Rosario	Marty	
2026	Killing Castro	Sam Giancana	
TBA	Empire City †	Commissioner Lance Davies	Post-production
TBA	The Bookie & the Bruiser †	Generale Francesco Viscuzo	Post-production

=== Television ===
Year	Title	Role	Notes
1986	L.A. Law	Sgt. Costellano	Episode: "The Princess and the Wiener King"
1987	Blood Vows: The Story of a Mafia Wife	-	TV movie
1987	Cagney & Lacey	Trucker #2	Episode: "Waste Deep"
1988	Ohara	Billy	Episode: "They Shoot Witnesses, Don't They?"
1988	China Beach	Lazaro	Episode: "Chao Ong"
1988	Freddy's Nightmares	Paul	Episode: "Mother's Day"
1990	1st & Ten	Rocko	Episode: "Who Stole Johnny Gunn?"
1990	Dragnet	Jack Middleton	Episode: "Parachute to Death"
1990	Hunter	Loan Shark	Episode: "This Is My Gun"
1990	Doogie Howser, M.D.	Karl	Episode: "TV or Not TV"
1990	The New Adam-12	Gregory Smith	Episode: "Escapees"
1990	After the Shock	Dr. Steven Brattesani	TV movie
1991	Father Dowling Mysteries	Security Guard	Episode: "The Fugitive Priest Mystery
1991	The 100 Lives of Black Jack Savage	Charlie Dilwig	Episode: "For Whom the Wedding Bells Toll"
1991	The Trials of Rosie O'Neill	Vinnie	Episode: "Knock, Knock"
1992	The Commish	Benny Gorzo	Episode: "Sex, Lies and Kerosene"
1992	Sibs	Lance	Episode: "If I Only Had a Dad"
1992	Midnight Heat	New Yorker	TV movie
1993	The Last Outlaw	Posseman Grubb	TV movie
1994	State of Emergency	Trevor Jacobs	TV movie
1994	Web of Deception	Detective Fracinetti	TV movie
1994	L.A. Law	Bowles' Atty. Peters	Episode: "Age of Insolence"
1994	The Adventures of Brisco County, Jr.	Joey Tataglia	Episode: "Wild Card"
1994	The X-Files	Dr. Aaron Monte	Episode: "Tooms"
1995	Sweet Justice	Terry Phillips	Episode: "Clouds of Glory"
1996	Aaahh!!! Real Monsters	Carney/Man on Stilts (voice)	Episode: "Baby It's You/Monsters Are Fun"
1994–97	NYPD Blue	Steve Richards	Guest cast (season 2–3 & 5)
1997	The Practice	Benny Small	Episode: "Search and Seizure" & "Save the Mule"
1997	Ed McBain's 87th Precinct: Heatwave	Det. Meyer	TV movie
1998	Brooklyn South	Steve Richards	Episode: "Skel in a Cell"
1998	Tempting Fate	Police Officer	TV movie
1998–99	Rude Awakening	Carl	Guest cast (season 1–2)
1999	Early Edition	Elliot Rosenfield	Episode: "Funny Valentine"
1999	L.A. Doctors	-	Episode: "Forty-Eight Minutes"
2000	The David Cassidy Story	Wes Farrell	TV movie
2000	The Three Stooges	Moe Howard	TV movie
2000	The Invisible Man	Robert Albert Hobbes	Main cast
2002	Crossing Jordan	Theo	Episode: "Someone to Count On"
2003	Fastlane	Marty	Episode: "Strap On"
2003	Las Vegas	Michael	Episode: "Pros and Cons"
2003–08	The Wire	Spiros 'Vondas' Vondopoulos	Main cast (season 2), guest (season 4), recurring cast (season 5)
2004	Strong Medicine	Frank	Episode: "Body Mass Increase"
2005	Alias	Carter	Episode: "Another Mister Sloane"
2005	Monk	Al Nicoletto	Episode: "Mr. Monk Gets Drunk"
2005	Curb Your Enthusiasm	Ticket Scalper	Episode: "The Larry David Sandwich"
2005–08	Entourage	Alan Gray	Guest (season 2), recurring cast (season 3 & 5)
2006	CSI: Crime Scene Investigation	Joey	Episode: "Killer"
2006	The Shield	Detective Paul Reyes	Episode: "Man Inside"
2006	My Name Is Earl	Coach Lou	Episode: "Sticks & Stones"
2007	John from Cincinnati	Palaka	Main cast
2007	Shark	Ricky Rago	Episode: "For Whom the Skel Rolls"
2008–12	In Plain Sight	Marshal Stan McQueen	Main cast
2009	Everybody Hates Chris	Coach Thurman	Recurring cast (season 4)
2010	The Mentalist	Noah Landau	Episode: "Redline"
2011	CSI: NY	Carmen Enzo	Episode: "Party Down"
2011	Childrens Hospital	Spiros	Episode: "Father's Day"
2012	Are We There Yet?	Mr. Parker	Recurring cast (season 3)
2013	Vegas	Barry Silver	Recurring cast
2013	Person of Interest	Detective Cameron	Episode: "Reasonable Doubts"
2013	Hawaii Five-0	Agent Devin Campbell	Episode: "Hau'oli La Ho'omoaika'i"
2013	Mob City	Jack Dragna	Recurring cast
2014	True Detective	Major Leroy Salter	Episode: "Haunted Houses"
2014	Matador	Gene Balasco	Recurring cast
2014	Castle	Dino Scarpella	Episode: "Bad Santa"
2015	Allegiance	Special Agent Faber	Recurring cast
2016	Vinyl	Maury Gold	Main cast
2016	Kingdom	Bob	Recurring cast (season 2)
2016	Chicago Med	Mr. McGregor	Episode: "Win Loss"
2017	The Mick	Jerry Berlin	Recurring cast (season 1)
2017	Preacher	Viktor Kruglov	Recurring cast (season 2)
2017	Lethal Weapon	Frank Truno	Episode: "Fork-Getta-Bout-It"
2018	The Resident	Edmund Carver	Episode: "No Matter the Cost"
2018	Santa Clarita Diet	Mark	Recurring cast (season 2)
2018	The Neighborhood	Matty 'Cigars'	Main cast
2018–19	Goliath	Cleft Chin	Recurring cast (season 2), guest (season 3)
2019	Bull	Ryan Vance	Episode: "Split Hairs"
2019	The Village	Angelo Napolitano	Recurring cast
2019	FBI	Mark Krawley	Episode: "Appearances"
2019	Will & Grace	Mario	Episode: "Pappa Mia"
2019–20	Law & Order: Special Victims Unit	Counselor Peter Abrams	Recurring cast (season 21)
2020	The Baker and the Beauty	Contractor	Episode: "Side Effects"
2020–23	Gravesend	Matty 'Cigars'	Main cast (season 1), guest (season 2)
2022	Pam & Tommy	Richard Alden	Recurring cast
2022	FBI: Most Wanted	Jackie 'The Fox' Bianchi	Episode: "Greatest Hits"
2023	Paul T. Goldman	Mob Boss	Recurring cast
2024	Diarra from Detroit	Zervas	Recurring cast
2024	The Lincoln Lawyer	Sly Funaro Sr.	Recurring cast (season 3)
2024	Everybody Still Hates Chris	Mr. Thurman (voice)	Recurring cast
2024	Creature Commandos	Bulldozer (voice)	Episode: "Cheers to the Tin Man"
2024–25	Bookie	Nick Quatrani	Recurring cast (season 2)
2024–25	The Chosen	Herod Antipas	Recurring cast (season 4-5)
2024–25	Nobody Wants This	Ilan Roklov	Recurring cast
2025–26	Power Book III: Raising Kanan	Phil Russo	7 episodes
2026	Man on Fire	CIA Director Moncrief	3 episodes
2026	M.I.A.	Boris Federov	5 episodes
2026	Lanterns	Antaan	Recurring cast
TBA	The Boys from Brazil †	Sidney Beynon	Upcoming series
