= Mean Business on North Ganson Street =

Book by S. Craig Zahler

- First edition
- Author: S. Craig Zahler
- Language: English
- Genre: Crime thriller
- Publisher: Thomas Dunne Books
- Publication date: September 30, 2014
- Publication place: United States
- Media type: Print (paperback)
- Pages: 304
- ISBN: 1-250-05220-3

Mean Business on North Ganson Street is a 2014 crime thriller novel written by S. Craig Zahler and published by Thomas Dunne Books. The plot concerns a detective named Jules Bettinger who relocates to Victory, Missouri, a collapsed Rust Belt city, where he and his new partner investigate a double homicide in which two policemen were killed—an event that might be the beginning of a series of executions.

== Reception ==
Mean Business was nominated for the Spur and Peacemaker awards, and received a starred review for excellence by Booklist and praise from Kirkus Review.

== Adaptation ==
In 2013, Warner Bros. acquired the rights to the novel to make it into a feature film with Leonardo DiCaprio and Jamie Foxx.
