= Vince Vaughn =

American actor (born 1970)

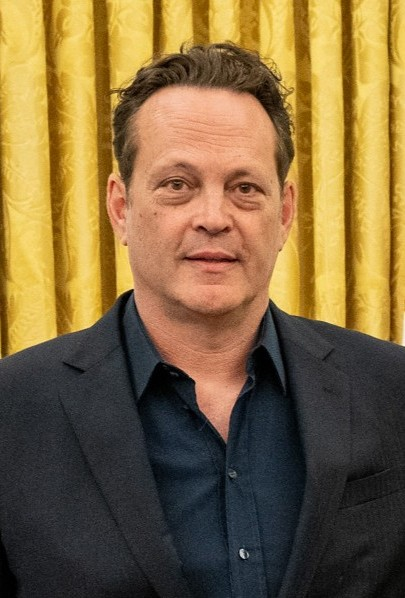
- Vaughn in 2025
- Born: Vincent Anthony Vaughn; March 28, 1970 (age 56); Minneapolis, Minnesota, U.S.
- Occupation: Actor
- Years active: 1988–present
- Spouse: Kyla Weber (m. 2010)
- Children: 2

Vincent Anthony Vaughn (born March 28, 1970) is an American actor. He is known for starring as a leading man in numerous comedy films during the late 1990s and 2000s. He has won a Critics' Choice Award and earned nominations for a Actors Award and a Emmy Award.

Vaughn made his acting debut in the sports drama film Rudy (1993). He had his career breakthrough with the comedy Swingers (1996). He starred in a string of successful comedy films such as Old School (2003), Dodgeball: A True Underdog Story (2004), Wedding Crashers (2005), The Break-Up (2006), Fred Claus (2007), Four Christmases (2008), Couples Retreat (2009), The Dilemma (2011), The Internship, and Delivery Man (both 2013).

He is also known for his dramatic roles playing Nick Van Owen in The Lost World: Jurassic Park (1997), and Norman Bates in Psycho (1998). He acted in other drama films such as The Locusts (1997), Return to Paradise (1998), The Cell, South of Heaven, West of Hell (both 2000), Domestic Disturbance (2001), Hacksaw Ridge (2016), Brawl in Cell Block 99 (2017), Dragged Across Concrete (2018), and Freaky (2020).

On television, he starred as career criminal Frank Semyon in the second season of the HBO anthology crime drama television series True Detective (2015), and as a detective turned restaurant inspector in the Apple TV+ drama series Bad Monkey (2024). He also took recurring roles in the animated Netflix sitcom F Is for Family (2018), and in the HBO comedy series Curb Your Enthusiasm (2020–2024).

== Early life ==
Vaughn was born in Minneapolis, Minnesota. His mother, Sharon Eileen (née DePalmo), is a real estate agent and stockbroker who was once ranked one of the top U.S. money managers by Bloomberg Wealth Manager magazine. His father, Vernon Lindsay Vaughn, worked as a salesman for a toy company. Vincent's Catholic mother and Protestant father raised him in both the Protestant and Catholic faiths. He has Italian, Irish, English, Lebanese, and German ancestry.

Vaughn lived in Buffalo Grove, Illinois, until he was eight years old. After moving to Lake Forest, he graduated from Lake Forest High School in 1988 where he played football and baseball and wrestled; however, he has called himself "unathletic" and "very average" at high school sports. At a young age, he had been introduced to musical theater and, in 1987, decided to become an actor. He has credited his mother as the inspiration for his career, saying, "I saw her overcome stuff, and I thought if you worked hard at something you'd give yourself a chance".

== Career ==
=== 1988–2002: Career beginnings ===
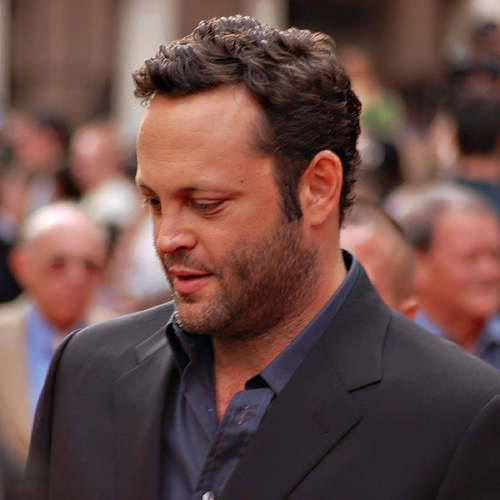
Vaughn in 2006

In 1988, Vaughn was cast in a Chevrolet commercial and subsequently moved to Hollywood. He appeared in the 1989 season of the television series China Beach and in three CBS Schoolbreak Specials in 1990. His first film role was 1993's Rudy as Notre Dame football tailback Jamie O'Hara. He struck up a friendship with Jon Favreau, who was also a first-time actor. Two years later, he was cast in a lead role in a proposed revival of 77 Sunset Strip that was to air on the fledgling WB Television Network, but the project ceased development after initial testing.

Vaughn gained wider success with his role in 1996's Swingers with Favreau. Afterward, Steven Spielberg cast Vaughn as Nick Van Owen in the 1997 blockbuster The Lost World: Jurassic Park, which gave him increased exposure. He followed that up with the lead role in The Locusts the same year. In 1998, he starred in the critically acclaimed drama Return to Paradise with Anne Heche, and starred in Clay Pigeons with Janeane Garofalo and Joaquin Phoenix. In 2000, he starred in The Cell with Jennifer Lopez and in 2001, appeared in Made, another film penned by Favreau. Vaughn also appeared in Dwight Yoakam's directorial debut, South of Heaven, West of Hell (2000). He also starred with John Travolta in the thriller Domestic Disturbance (2001).

=== 2003–2014: Comedic stardom ===
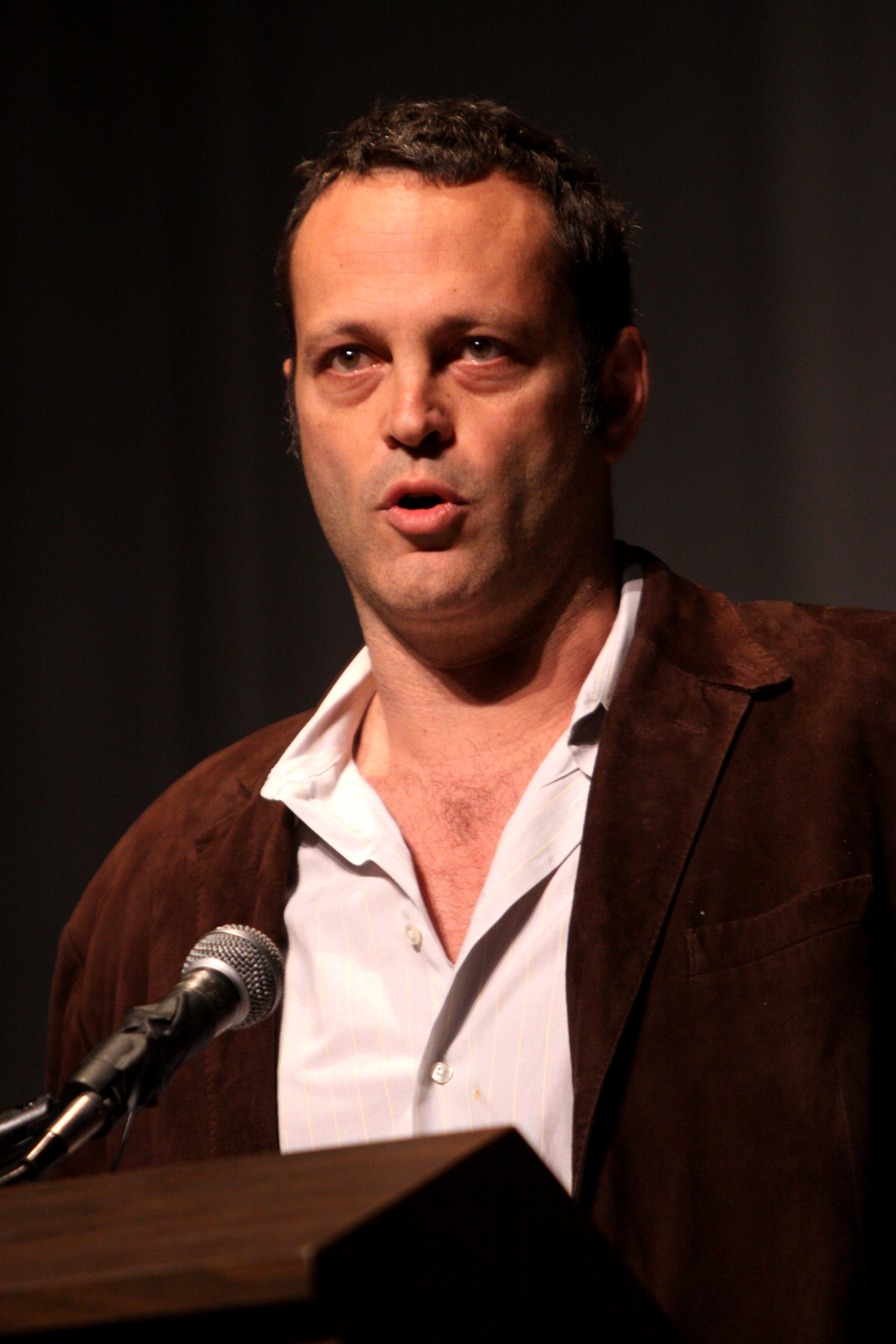
Vaughn in 2011

Vaughn's performance in the 2003 comedy Old School increased his popularity, establishing him as a leading man in comedic films. Vaughn starred opposite Will Ferrell and Luke Wilson. The film was a commercial and critical success. In 2004, Vaughn appeared alongside Ben Stiller in the buddy cop action-comedy Starsky & Hutch and the sports comedy Dodgeball: A True Underdog Story. Both films were commercial hits. Film critic Rob Mackie of The Guardian compared the satirical nature within the film Dodgeball to that of the Rob Reiner directed comedy film This Is Spinal Tap (1984) and added that the film "stays consistently funny".

After this series of roles, he was dubbed one of the Hollywood "Frat Pack", alongside Will Ferrell, Ben Stiller, Jack Black, and Owen Wilson. The name refers to the group of actors who frequently co-star in film comedies. He appeared in 2005's independent film Thumbsucker, crime-comedy film Be Cool, and action-comedy film Mr. & Mrs. Smith. Also in 2005, Vaughn starred alongside Owen Wilson in Wedding Crashers, which grossed over $200 million at the U.S. box office. The film also starred Rachel McAdams, Bradley Cooper, Isla Fisher, and Christopher Walken. Critics J.R. Jones of The Chicago Reader praised both Vaughn and Wilson on their chemistry describing them as "enormously funny" adding the film is a "rich send-ups of wedding culture".

In 2006, Vaughn starred in the comedy-drama The Break-Up opposite Jennifer Aniston. Rosie Wash of The Guardian wrote that the film, "subverts the love-conquers-all formula of traditional rom-com to arrive at the more satisfying conclusion". In 2007, Vaughn starred in the Christmas comedy film Fred Claus as a sarcastic, wild-at-heart older brother of Santa Claus (Paul Giamatti). The film was directed by David Dobkin, who had directed Vaughn in Wedding Crashers, and co-starred Elizabeth Banks and Kevin Spacey. Next, he moved from comedy to drama in Sean Penn's Into the Wild, a film about the adventures of Christopher McCandless, based on the best-selling book by Jon Krakauer. In 2008, Vaughn starred in his second Christmas comedy, Four Christmases, with Reese Witherspoon. The film portrays a couple who struggle to visit all four of their divorced parents on Christmas.

In 2009, he starred in Couples Retreat, a comedy chronicling four couples who undergo therapy sessions at a tropical island resort. Malin Åkerman played his wife. Vince's father, Vernon, portrayed his father in the film. In February 2010, Vaughn was among the nearly 80 musicians and actors to sing the charity-single remake of We Are the World. Vaughn starred in Ron Howard's comedy The Dilemma, released in January 2011. It was produced by Wild West Picture Show Productions, his production company. On July 31, 2012, it was announced that Vaughn would be developing a reboot produced by CBS to the sitcom The Brady Bunch, which was taken off the air in 1974. In 2013, Vaughn co-wrote and starred alongside Owen Wilson in The Internship.

=== 2015–present: Dramatic roles and TV work ===
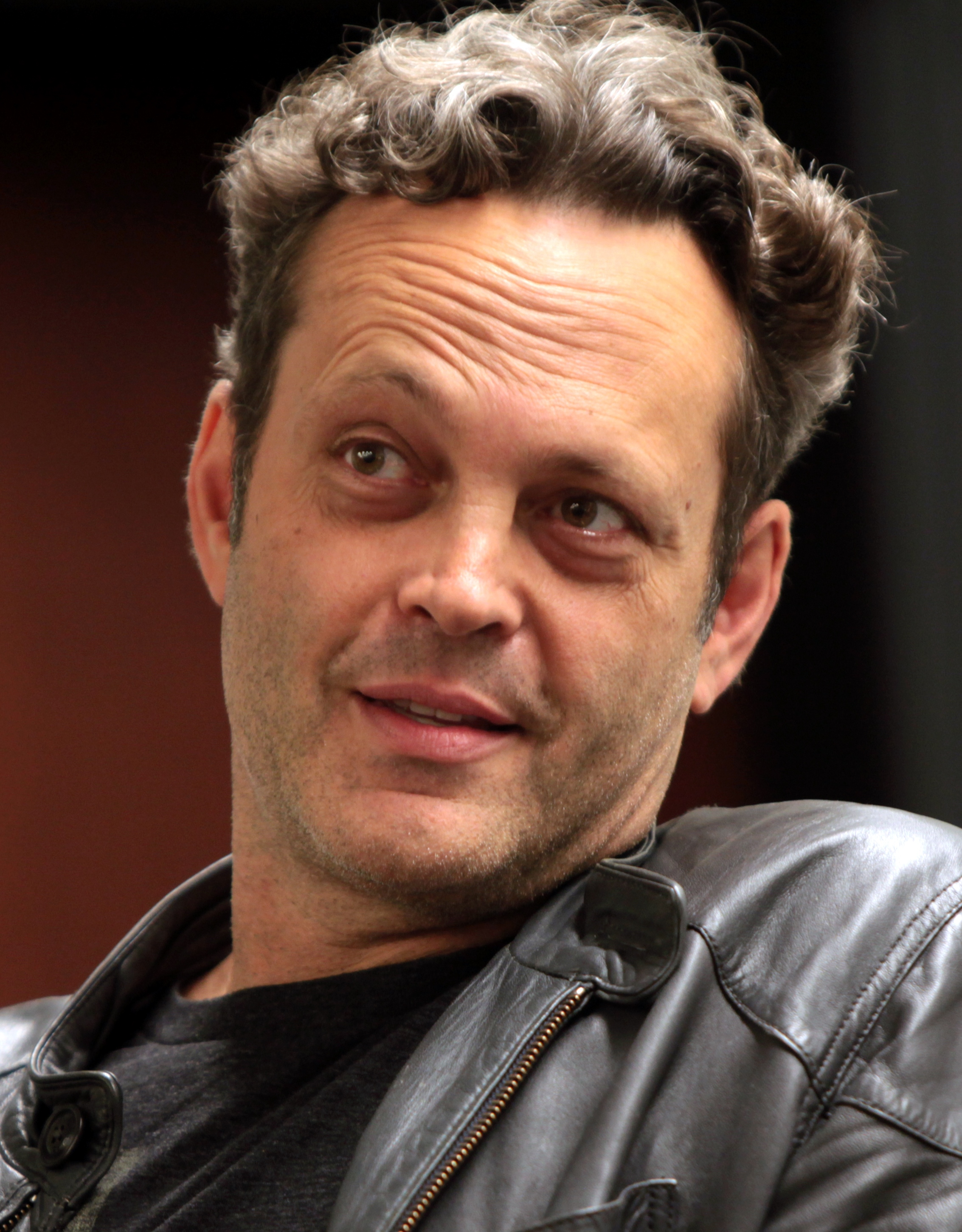
Vaughn in 2015

In 2015, he starred in Unfinished Business, which grossed $4.8 million in its opening weekend, a career low for Vaughn. He also starred in the second season of True Detective alongside Colin Farrell, which premiered on June 21. In 2016, he starred in the crime thriller Term Life, which featured Favreau in a supporting role and was directed by Peter Billingsley. Also in 2016, he played a drill sergeant in the war film Hacksaw Ridge.

In 2018, Vaughn co-starred alongside Mel Gibson in Dragged Across Concrete, his second collaboration with S. Craig Zahler, whom he worked with the year before on Brawl in Cell Block 99. In 2020, he starred with Kathryn Newton in the horror-comedy film Freaky, in which they play a serial killer and a teenage girl who switch bodies. On January 20, 2022, it was announced that Vaughn would produce a sequel to the 1983 film A Christmas Story titled A Christmas Story Christmas with Peter Billingsley (who reprised his role as Ralphie) through his production company Wild West Picture Show Productions for Warner Bros. Pictures and HBO Max.

In March 2022, Vaughn, Greg Olsen, and Ryan Kalil launched a podcast network and production company named Audiorama. The first podcast available from the network, Youth, Inc., focuses on youth sports. In 2024, he starred in the Apple TV+ drama series Bad Monkey playing a detective turned restaurant inspector. The show is created by Bill Lawrence and debuted on August 14, 2024.

In August 2024, Vaughn received a star on the Hollywood Walk of Fame in the category of Motion Pictures.

== Personal life ==
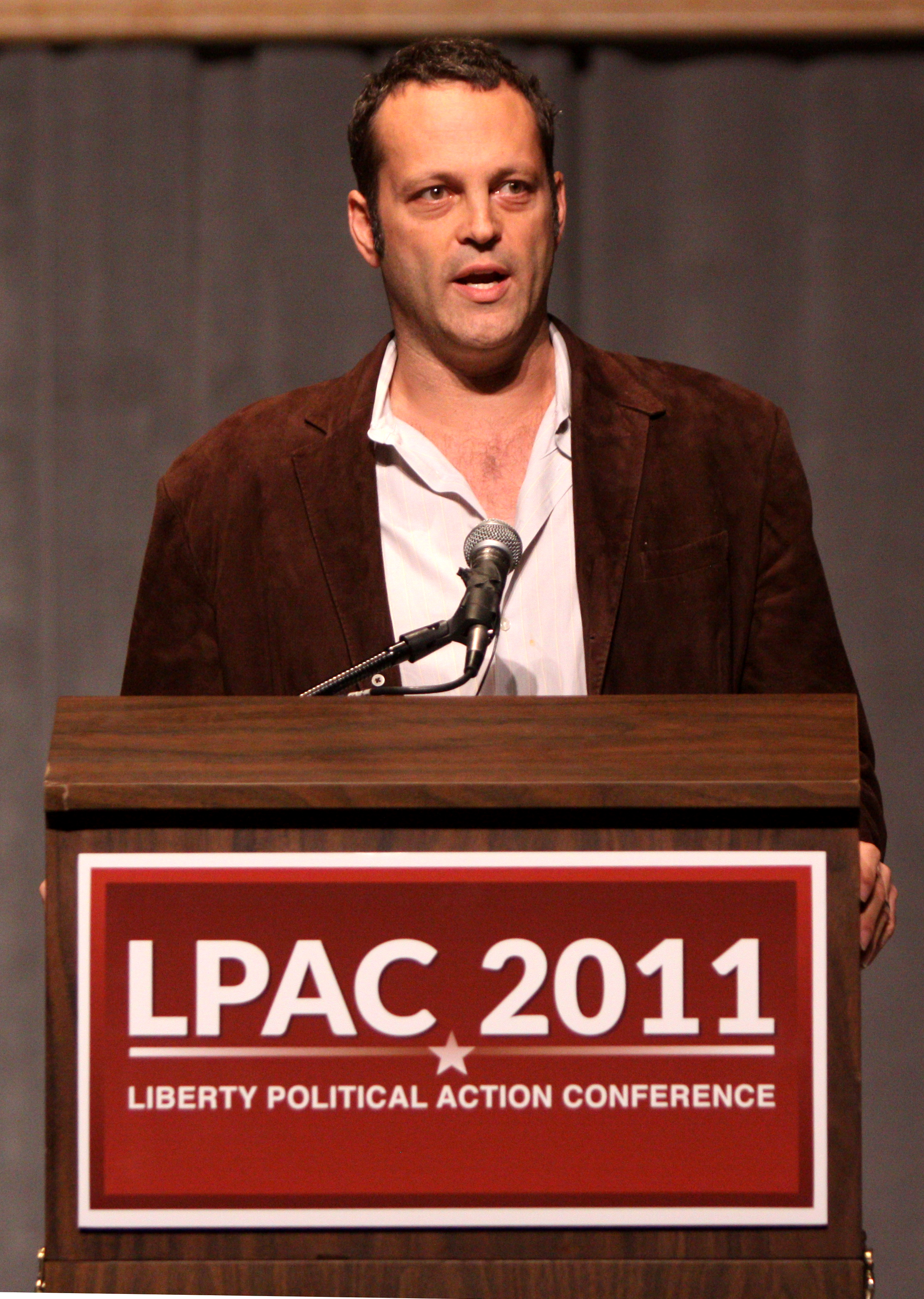
Vaughn at the Liberty Political Action Conference in Reno, Nevada, September 2011

In 2005, Vaughn began dating Jennifer Aniston, his co-star in The Break-Up. In late 2006, he sued three tabloid magazines for reporting that he had been unfaithful to Aniston. They broke up in November 2006.

In March 2009, it was announced that Vaughn was engaged to Canadian realtor Kyla Weber. They married on January 2, 2010, in the Armour House at Lake Forest Academy in Lake Forest, Illinois. Their two children were born in 2010 and 2013.

Vaughn is a fan of the Chicago Bears.

Vaughn describes himself as a libertarian. He supported Republican presidential candidate Ron Paul in both the 2008 and 2012 elections, and Rand Paul in the 2016 election. In June 2015, Vaughn expressed his opposition to gun control.

In 2016, Vaughn began training in Brazilian jiu-jitsu at the Gracie Academy in Torrance, California. He received his blue belt in 2018.

On June 10, 2018, Vaughn was arrested on suspicion of drunken driving and resisting arrest in Manhattan Beach, California, after failing a sobriety test at a police checkpoint. In May 2019, he was convicted of a reduced charge of reckless driving after he entered a no contest plea. Vaughn was sentenced to three years' probation and ordered to undergo a three-month alcohol abuse program.

In 2019, Vaughn received the Meritorious Public Service Medal from the U.S. Army for his contributions to service members' morale.

He is the majority shareholder of the Coachella Valley Scorpions, a team of the National Pickleball League (NPL), launched in 2023, for players aged 50 and up.

== Filmography ==
=== Film ===
Year	Title	Role	Notes
1991	For the Boys	Cheering Soldier in Crowd	Uncredited
1993	Rudy	Jamie O'Hara	Credited as Vincent Vaughn
1994	At Risk	Max Nolan	
1996	Just Your Luck	Barry	Direct-to-video
1996	Swingers	Trent Walker	
1997	The Lost World: Jurassic Park	Nick Van Owen	
1997	The Locusts	Clay Hewitt	
1998	A Cool, Dry Place	Russell Durrell	
1998	Return to Paradise	John "Sheriff" Volgecherev	
1998	Clay Pigeons	Lester Long	
1998	Psycho	Norman Bates	
2000	South of Heaven, West of Hell	Taylor Henry	
2000	The Cell	FBI Agent Peter Novak	
2000	The Prime Gig	Pendelton "Penny" Wise	
2001	Made	Ricky Slade	Also producer
2001	Zoolander	Luke Zoolander	Uncredited cameo
2001	Domestic Disturbance	Rick Barnes / Jack Parnell	
2003	Old School	Bernard "Beanie" Campbell	
2003	I Love Your Work	Stiev	
2003	Blackball	Rick Schwartz	
2004	Starsky & Hutch	Reese Feldman	
2004	Dodgeball: A True Underdog Story	Peter La Fleur	
2004	Anchorman: The Legend of Ron Burgundy	Wes Mantooth	Uncredited
2004	Wake Up, Ron Burgundy: The Lost Movie	Wes Mantooth	Uncredited
2004	Paparazzi	Actor	
2005	Thumbsucker	Mr. Geary	
2005	Be Cool	Roger "Raji" Lowenthal	
2005	Mr. & Mrs. Smith	Eddie	
2005	Wedding Crashers	Jeremy Grey	
2006	The Break-Up	Gary Grobowski	Also writer and producer
2007	Into the Wild	Wayne Westerberg	
2007	Fred Claus	Frederick "Fred" Claus	Also producer
2008	Wild West Comedy Show	Himself	Also producer
2008	Four Christmases	Brad / Orlando McVie	Also producer
2009	Couples Retreat	Dave	Also writer and producer
2011	The Dilemma	Ronny Valentine	Also producer
2012	Art of Conflict: The Murals of Northern Ireland	Narrator	Documentary; also producer
2012	The Watch	Bob McAllister	
2012	Lay the Favorite	Rosie	
2013	The Internship	Billy McMahon	Also writer and producer
2013	A Case of You	Alan	
2013	Delivery Man	David Wozniak	
2013	Anchorman 2: The Legend Continues	Wes Mantooth	Cameo
2015	Unfinished Business	Daniel "Dan" Trunkman	
2016	Term Life	Nick Barrow	Also producer
2016	Hacksaw Ridge	Sgt. Howell	
2017	Brawl in Cell Block 99	Bradley Thomas	
2018	Dragged Across Concrete	Anthony Lurasetti	
2019	Fighting with My Family	Hutch Morgan	
2019	Seberg	Carl Kowalski	
2020	Arkansas	Frog	
2020	The Binge	Principal Carleson	
2020	Freaky	Blissfield Butcher / Millie Kessler	
2021	North Hollywood	Oliver	
2021	Queenpins	Simon Kilmurray	
2025	Broke	—N/a	Producer
2025	Nonnas	Joe Scaravella	Also executive producer
2025	Easy's Waltz	Easy	
2026	Mike & Nick & Nick & Alice	Nick	
2027	Animal Friends		Post-production
TBA	The Bookie & the Bruiser	Boscolo	Filming

=== Television ===
Year	Title	Role	Notes	Ref.
1989	China Beach	Motor Pool Driver	Episode: "The Unquiet Earth"	
1989	21 Jump Street	Bill Peterson	Episode: "Mike's P.O.V."	
1990	ABC Afterschool Specials	Jason	Episode: "A Question About Sex"	
1990	CBS Schoolbreak Special	Steve	Episode: "Malcom Takes a Shot"	
1990	CBS Schoolbreak Special	Steve Guarino	Episode: "The Fourth Man"	
1991	CBS Schoolbreak Special	Richard	Episode: "Lies of the Heart"	
1992	Doogie Howser, M.D.	Mark	Episode: "Sons of the Desert"	
1998	Mr. Show with Bob and David	Sheep Dog	Episode: "It's Perfectly Understandishable"	
1998	Hercules	Loki (voice)	Episode: "Hercules and the Twilight of the Gods"	
1998	The Larry Sanders Show	Himself	Episode: "The Interview"	
1998	Saturday Night Live	Himself (host)	Episode: "Vince Vaughn/Lauryn Hill"	
2000	Sex and the City	Keith Travers	Episode: "Sex and Another City"	
2001	Going to California	Gavin Toe	Episode: "This Year's Model"	
2013	Pursuit of the Truth	Himself (host)	10 episodes; also producer	
2013	Saturday Night Live	Himself (host)	Episode: "Vince Vaughn/Miguel"	
2015	True Detective	Frank Semyon	8 episodes	
2018	F Is for Family	Chet Stevenson (voice)	8 episodes; also executive producer	
2020–2024	Curb Your Enthusiasm	Freddy Funkhouser	11 episodes	
2022	A Christmas Story Christmas	—N/a	Television movie; producer only	
2024–present	Bad Monkey	Andrew Yancy	Main role; also executive producer	
2025	Tires	Mike	Episode: "The Tri-State Mid Market Tire Expo"	
2026	Life, Larry and the Pursuit of Unhappiness	Jacob Donner	Episode: "Lawrence"	

=== Music videos ===
Year	Title	Artist(s)
1998	"These Arms"	Dwight Yoakam
2010	"We Are the World 25 for Haiti"	Artists for Haiti
2016	"Don't Wanna Know"	Maroon 5

=== Video games ===
Year	Title	Voice role	Notes
1997	Chaos Island: The Lost World	Nick Van Owen	

== Awards and nominations ==
Organizations	Year	Category	Work	Result	Ref.
Actor Awards	2008	Outstanding Performance by a Cast in a Motion Picture	Into the Wild	Nominated	
Australian Film Critics Association	2017	Best Supporting Actor	Hacksaw Ridge	Nominated	
Blockbuster Entertainment Awards	2001	Favorite Actor – Science Fiction	The Cell	Nominated	
CinemaCon Awards	2013	Comedy Duo of the Year (with Owen Wilson)	The Internship	Won	
Critics' Choice Super Awards	2021	Best Actor in a Horror Movie	Freaky	Won	
Gold Derby Awards	2008	Ensemble Cast	Into the Wild	Nominated	
Golden Schmoes Awards	2005	Favorite Celebrity of the Year	—N/a	Nominated	
MTV Movie & TV Awards	2003	Best On-Screen Team (with Will Ferrell & Luke Wilson)	Old School	Nominated	
MTV Movie & TV Awards	2005	Best On-Screen Team (with the cast of Dodgeball)	DodgeBall: A True Underdog Story	Nominated	
MTV Movie & TV Awards	2006	Best Comedic Performance	Wedding Crashers	Nominated	
MTV Movie & TV Awards	2006	Best On-Screen Team (with Owen Wilson)	Wedding Crashers	Won	
MTV Movie & TV Awards	2021	Most Frightened Performance	Freaky	Nominated	
People's Choice Awards	2006	Favorite On-Screen Match-Up (with Owen Wilson)	Wedding Crashers	Won	
People's Choice Awards	2007	Favorite Leading Man	The Break-Up	Won	
People's Choice Awards	2007	Favorite On-Screen Match-Up (with Jennifer Aniston)	The Break-Up	Nominated	
People's Choice Awards	2010	Favorite Comedy Star	Couples Retreat	Nominated	
Primetime Emmy Awards	2025	Outstanding Television Movie (as Executive Producer)	Nonnas	Nominated	
Saturn Awards	2018	Best Actor	Brawl in Cell Block 99	Nominated	
ShoWest Convention Awards	2006	Comedy Star of the Year	—N/a	Won	
Teen Choice Awards	2005	Choice Movie – Sleazbag	Be Cool	Nominated	
Teen Choice Awards	2006	Choice Movie Actor – Comedy	The Break-Up	Nominated	
Teen Choice Awards	2006	Choice Movie – Chemistry (with Jennifer Aniston)	The Break-Up	Won	
Teen Choice Awards	2010	Choice Movie – Hissy Fit	Couples Retreat	Nominated	
