= Nonnas =

- Release poster
- Directed by: Stephen Chbosky
- Written by: Liz Maccie
- Produced by: Gigi Pritzker; Rachel Shane; Jack Turner
- Starring: Vince Vaughn; Lorraine Bracco; Talia Shire; Brenda Vaccaro; Joe Manganiello; Linda Cardellini; Susan Sarandon
- Cinematography: Florian Ballhaus
- Edited by: Anne McCabe
- Music by: Marcelo Zarvos
- Production companies: Fifth Season; 1Community; Madison Wells; Matador Content
- Distributed by: Netflix
- Release date: May 9, 2025
- Running time: 114 minutes
- Country: United States
- Language: English

Nonnas is a 2025 American biographical comedy-drama film directed by Stephen Chbosky, written by Liz Maccie, and starring Vince Vaughn, Lorraine Bracco, Talia Shire, Brenda Vaccaro with Linda Cardellini and Susan Sarandon. The film is based on the life of Joe Scaravella, who created the Staten Island restaurant Enoteca Maria. He risks everything to honor his recently deceased, beloved mother by opening an Italian restaurant with actual grandmothers as chefs.

A co-production of Fifth Season, 1Community, Madison Wells, and Matador Content, the film was released on Netflix on May 9, 2025, and received mostly positive reviews. As the film was released during Mother's Day weekend in the United States, the film hit No. 1 in the country.

== Plot ==
As he grieves the death of his mother, MTA mechanic Joe Scaravella reminisces about his childhood in 1970s Brooklyn when his grandmother and mother Maria would be in the kitchen cooking for friends and family. He remembers what they taught him and tries to recreate the dishes they made but cannot pin down his nonna's Sunday gravy.

Joe's best friend Bruno and his wife Stella encourage him to use his mother's life insurance money to do something good for himself. Joe visits an open-air market on Staten Island that he used to go to with his mother and nonna. There he runs into Olivia, his high school crush, and Antonella, her older neighbor with whom she's shopping. After seeing a closed restaurant, he decides to reopen it and call it Enoteca Maria after his mother. The key feature would be a kitchen staffed by nonnas, so that the food reminds people of their childhood.

Despite resistance from Staten Island locals, Joe proceeds with his plan. He enlists Bruno's help as a contractor and restores the space to a classic Italian restaurant. Meanwhile, he hires Antonella, his mother's best friend Roberta, her former hairdresser Gia, and a walk-in applicant named Teresa. The nonnas clash being from different backgrounds, particularly the Sicilian Roberta and the Bolognese Antonella. However, after Gia invites them to a private pampering session at her salon, the women bond and become friends.

While the nonnas are developing the menu, Roberta makes capuzzelle, accidentally starting a fire in the kitchen just before the inspector shows up. The inspector fails the restaurant due to the fire damage and tells Joe it could be a year before he can line up another inspection, leading to a fight between Joe and Bruno that ends with Joe kicking Bruno out of the restaurant.

Joe later goes to apologize and learns that Bruno had covered his own costs by selling his prized car. Joe and Bruno reconcile. Olivia, a lawyer, tracks down the inspector, learns that he has a history of unethical practices, and compels him to conduct another inspection immediately. The restaurant passes, and they prepare to open.

On opening night, a major thunderstorm hits the area, and nobody shows up to the restaurant besides Bruno and Stella. Antonella finds out that one of the main vendors at the market has been speaking out against the restaurant, contributing to its poor business. Joe attempts to stir up business by inviting food critic Edward Durant to review the restaurant, but he declines because he only covers fancy Manhattan restaurants.

After weeks of no business, Joe reluctantly decides to close the restaurant. As a last hurrah, he hosts a dinner party for friends, co-workers, and the like. He decides to open an envelope left to him by his mother that he had been avoiding since her death and finds inside the recipes for all of her and his nonna's dishes, including the elusive Sunday gravy. Joe goes back to his old life, but a few days later Bruno visits him with a newspaper article about the restaurant where one attendee of the final dinner party was a critic sent incognito by Durant. The critic writes a glowing review, which leads to a surge in business. The restaurant becomes a success, allowing Joe to buy back Bruno's car. Olivia and Joe start a relationship.

During the credits, scenes from the real-life Enoteca Maria are shown, noting that the restaurant has been open for 15 years and is staffed by nonnas from all over the world.

== Cast ==
- Vince Vaughn as Joe "Joey" Scaravella
  - Theodore Helm as young Joe
- Lorraine Bracco as Roberta, Joe's mother's best friend and a chef at Enoteca Maria
  - Dee Roscioli as young Roberta
- Talia Shire as Teresa, a former nun and a chef at Enoteca Maria
- Brenda Vaccaro as Antonella, Olivia's neighbor and a chef at Enoteca Maria
- Joe Manganiello as Bruno, Joe's best friend
  - Jack Casey as young Bruno
- Drea de Matteo as Stella, Bruno's wife
- Linda Cardellini as Olivia, Joe's high school crush
- Susan Sarandon as Gia, Joe's mother's hairdresser and a chef at Enoteca Maria
- Michael Rispoli as Al, a street food vendor and proud Staten Islander
- Campbell Scott as Edward Durant, a newspaper food critic
- Richie Moriarty as Dan McClane, Joe's boss
- Tammy Pescatelli as Cousin Tammy

== Production ==
Nonnas is based on the life of Joe Scaravella, the owner of Staten Island restaurant Enoteca Maria, where grandmothers (nonnas) are invited to work as chefs. Production companies Madison Wells and Matador Content purchased Scaravella's life rights and developed the project with screenwriter Liz Maccie.

Filming took place from May to June 2023 in various locations in New Jersey, including Jersey City, Hoboken, Bayonne, Paterson, Linden, Elizabeth, and Edison.

== Release ==
In September 2024, Netflix acquired worldwide distribution rights to the film in an auction for over $20 million, planning to release it sometime in 2025. The film was released on May 9, 2025.

== Reception ==
=== Critical response ===
On the review aggregator website Rotten Tomatoes, 82% of 67 critics' reviews are positive, with an average rating of 6.7/10. The website's consensus reads: "Like a homey dish prepared for family, Nonnas just wants to provide heaping helpings of comfort — and does so with enough charm that audiences may want seconds." Metacritic, which uses a weighted average, assigned the film a score of 56 out of 100, based on 15 critics, indicating "mixed or average" reviews.

In a largely positive review, The Guardian awarded the film three stars, saying it fell short of "recent cookery classic The Taste of Things" but praised its "straightforward sincerity that makes it go down easily." RogerEbert.com gave the film three stars out of four, writing, "It isn't a prestige film; it's the kind of story that reminds us we can heal through connections to the past and each other."

=== Accolades ===
Year	Award	Category	Recipient(s)	Result	Ref.
2025	Primetime Creative Arts Emmy Awards	Outstanding Television Movie	Scott Budnick, Ameet Shukla, Jay Peterson, Todd Lubin, Leah Culton Gonzalez, Stacy Calabrese, Amanda Morgan Palmer, Alexis Garcia, Jody Scaravella, Pamela Hirsch, Christopher Slager, Dan Guando, Vince Vaughn, Rachel Shane, Gigi Pritzker, and Jack Turner	Nominated	
2026	Artios Awards	Outstanding Achievement in Casting – Film, First Released for Television or Streaming	Mary Vernieu, Lindsay Graham, Findley Davidson, and Mark Droter	Nominated	
2026	Critics' Choice Awards	Best Movie Made for Television	Nonnas	Nominated	
2026	Directors Guild of America Awards	Outstanding Directorial Achievement in Movies for Television	Stephen Chbosky	Won	
2026	Guild of Music Supervisors Awards	Best Music Supervision in a Non-Theatrically Released Film	Frankie Pine	Won	
2026	Producers Guild of America Awards	Outstanding Producer of Televised or Streamed Motion Picture	Gigi Pritzker, Rachel Shane, and Jack Turner	Nominated	

== Viewership ==
According to data from Showlabs, Nonnas ranked fifth on Netflix in the United States during the week of 5–11 May 2025.
