= Stewart D. Friedman =

American academic

- Born: 1952 (age 73–74); Washington, D.C.
- Education: University of Michigan
- Occupations: Professor at Wharton School of Business - University of Pennsylvania, Author, Public Speaker, Consultant, Blogger at Harvard Business Review, Work–Life Integration Expert, Leadership Development Expert
- Website: www.totalleadership.org

Stewart D. Friedman is Emeritus Professor of Management Practice at the Wharton School of Business at the University of Pennsylvania and the founding director of the Wharton Leadership Program and Wharton's Work/Life Integration Project. He has been on the Wharton faculty since 1984 and has been recognized for his research, teaching, practice, and advocacy in the fields of Leadership Development, Human Resources and Work–Life Integration. In 2001, Friedman completed a two-year assignment as the director of the Leadership Development Center at Ford Motor Company, where he ran a 50-person, $25 million operation.

Friedman has published books and articles on work/life integration, leadership, and the dynamics of change.

== Education and early life ==
Friedman holds a B.A. in Psychology from S.U.N.Y. Binghamton and an M.A. in Psychology and Ph.D. in Organizational Psychology from the University of Michigan. Friedman is the older brother of actor Paul Ben-Victor.

== Career ==
Friedman has consulted for organizations, executives, and individuals, including Jack Welch, former Vice President Al Gore, two White House administrations, the United Nations, the U.S. Department of Labor, the U.S. Department of State, and the U.S. Army. He is on numerous advisory boards and conducts workshops on leadership and "the whole person," change creation, and strategic human resources issues. The recipient of numerous teaching awards, he appears regularly in business media, and The New York Times referred to the "rock star adoration" he inspires in his students.

Friedman hosts a weekly radio show, Work and Life, on Sirius XM 132, business radio from the Wharton School.

== Works ==
His book Leading The Life You Want: Skills for Integrating Work and Life is a Wall Street Best Seller. His book, Total Leadership: Be a Better Leader, Have a Richer Life, was published in June 2008 by Harvard Business Press. The book has been on the USA Today bestseller book list and won several other book awards.It has sold over 70,000 copies in the US and has been translated into Chinese, Japanese, Korean, Polish, Portuguese, Russian, and Spanish. In 2013 he wrote, Baby Bust: New Choices for Men and Women in Work and Family (Wharton Press). Friedman's book Work and Family—Allies or Enemies? (which he co-authored with Jeff Greenhaus) was recognized by The Wall Street Journal as one of the field's best books. In April 2011, Leadership Succession, which Friedman edited, was reissued in paperback by Transaction Publishers after being in print for 25 years.

Friedman writes about work-life integration, leadership, and other topics as a Harvard Business Review blogger.

=== Total Leadership ===
In Total Leadership: Be a Better Leader, Have a Richer Life, Friedman argues that leadership in business cannot be merely about business but has to be about life as a whole. Total Leadership is an approach to human resource management and leadership development created and tested at Ford and The Wharton School that suggests that leadership must be embodied at all levels of an organizational culture to create sustainable change that's beyond work-life balance that is good for work, family, community, and self (mind, body, and spirit).

This approach, Friedman writes, is superior at integrating work and the rest of life, preferable to the pursuit of "balance," which erroneously assumes the necessity of tradeoffs. With "four-way wins," all parties benefit. From this perspective, individuals realize that their actions as leaders serve a larger purpose, making the world better. Total Leadership is based upon following the principles of being real, being whole and being innovative, using stakeholder interviews for 360 degree feedback.

== Awards and recognitions ==
Friedman was awarded the Families and Work Institute's Legacy Award in 2013. He was chosen by Working Mother as one of "America's 25 most influential men for having made things better for working parents," was selected twice by HR Magazine as Most Influential Thinker and by Thinkers 50 as one of the "world's top 50 business thinkers" and in 2023 was inducted into their Hall of Fame.

In 2015 he won the Thinkers 50 Distinguished Achievement Award in Talent.

- Thinkers 50 in 2011 ("the definitive global ranking of management thinkers")
- "Excellence in Teaching Award: Core Curriculum in 2011". Wharton School.
- Winner of the CEO READ Best Business Book Award 2008 - Personal Development
- One of Working Mother's 25 most influential men in 2007 for "having made things better for working parents"
- William Whitney Teaching Award in 2007
- MBA Core Curriculum Teaching Award in 1996 (University of Pennsylvania)
- Outstanding Teaching Award in 1993 (University of Pennsylvania Undergraduate Evening School)
- Outstanding Teaching Award in 1990 (University of Pennsylvania Undergraduate Division)

== Books ==
- Baby Bust, 10th Anniversary Edition: New Choices for Men and Women in Work and Family, published by Wharton School Press in 2024 (ISBN 1-61363-177-4).
- Leading the Life You Want: Skills for Integrating Work and Life, published by Harvard Business Press in 2014 (ISBN 1-42218-941-4).
- Baby Bust: New Choices for Men and Women in Work and Family, published by Wharton Digital Press in 2013(ISBN 1-61363-034-4).
- Leadership Succession, published by Transaction Publishers in 2011 (ISBN 1-4128-4236-0).
- Total Leadership: Be a Better Leader, Have a Richer Life, published by Harvard Business School Press in 2008 (ISBN 1-42210-328-5).
- Work and Family—Allies or Enemies?, published by the Oxford University Press in 2000 (ISBN 0-19511-275-X).
- Integrating Work and Life: The Wharton Resource Guide, published in 1998 (ISBN 0-78794-022-4).

== Articles ==
- Friedman, S. D. and Lobel, S., 2003. The Happy Workaholic: a role model for employees. Academy of Management Executive, 17 (3): 87-98.
- Friedman, S. D., Christensen, P. and DeGroot, J., 1998. Work and life: the end of the zero-sum game. Harvard Business Review, Nov-Dec, 119-129. Reprinted as lead article in Harvard Business Review on work and life balance. Boston: Harvard Business School Press, 2000. Also reprinted in Leading through adversity (HBR OnPoint Collection), 2002.
- Robertson, T., 2005. Between work and life there's balance. Boston Globe, June 19.
- Hammonds, K. H., 2000. "Grassroots Leadership - Ford Motor Co. Fast Company, April.
