= Empire City (film) =

- Directed by: Michael Matthews
- Screenplay by: S. Craig Zahler; Brian Tucker
- Story by: S. Craig Zahler
- Produced by: Marc Butan; Gerard Butler; Alan Siegel; Paul Currie; Brian Tucker
- Starring: Gerard Butler; Hayley Atwell; Omari Hardwick; Mel Jarnson
- Cinematography: Bridger Nielson
- Production companies: Leonine Studios; MadRiver Pictures; Footloose Productions; Screen Australia; VicScreen; Ingenious; G-BASE Film Production
- Distributed by: Leonine Studios (Germany)
- Countries: United States; United Kingdom; Australia; Germany
- Language: English

Empire City is an upcoming action thriller film directed by Michael Matthews and written by S. Craig Zahler and Brian Tucker, based on an original story by Zahler. It stars Gerard Butler, Hayley Atwell, Omari Hardwick, and Mel Jarnson.

== Premise ==
When a hostage crisis erupts inside New York City's Clybourn Building, firefighter Rhett, working with his squad and his NYPD officer wife Dani, must navigate the building to rescue the captives trapped inside.

== Cast ==
- Gerard Butler as Rhett
- Hayley Atwell as Dani
- Omari Hardwick as Hawkins
- Mel Jarnson as Leda, Hawkins' right-hand operative
- Michael Imperioli as Mayor Holloway
- Danny Huston as Charles Clybourn
- Paul Ben-Victor as Commissioner Lance Davies
- Evan Handler as Chief Bagley
- Tre Hale
- Michael Beach
- Dominic Bogart
- Stephen Murphy
- Jack DiFalco
- Kaiwi Lyman-Mersereau

== Production ==
The original script was written by S. Craig Zahler, bearing the title Breaking the Empire State. The film, with revisions by Brian Tucker, was initially shopped at the 2024 Cannes Film Market as Empire State, packaged with Gerard Butler to star and Christian Gudegast to direct. By November 2025, it was repackaged for the 2025 American Film Market with Michael Matthews now directing and Hayley Atwell joining the cast. Principal photography began that month in Melbourne, with Bridger Nielson serving as the cinematographer. In January 2026, Omari Hardwick, Mel Jarnson, Tre Hale, Michael Beach, Dominic Bogart, Stephen Murphy, Jack DiFalco, and Kaiwi Lyman-Mersereau joined the cast. Filming wrapped in mid-February 2026. In March 2026, it was reported that Michael Imperioli, Danny Huston, Paul Ben-Victor, and Evan Handler were also part of the cast.
