= Get On Your Boots =

2009 single by U2

Single by U2

from the album No Line on the Horizon
- B-side: "No Line on the Horizon 2"
- Released: 19 January 2009
- Genre: Alternative rock
- Length: 3:24
- Label: Interscope; Mercury
- Composer: U2
- Lyricist: Bono
- Producers: Brian Eno; Daniel Lanois; Declan Gaffney

U2 singles chronology
"The Ballad of Ronnie Drew" (2008)	"Get On Your Boots" (2009)	"Magnificent" (2009)

Music video
- "Get On Your Boots" on YouTube

Audio sample
- "Get On Your Boots": file; help

"Get On Your Boots" is a song by Irish rock band U2 and the sixth track on their 2009 album No Line on the Horizon. The song was released as the album's lead single on 19 January 2009, with a physical release on 14 February. The lyrical delivery of the song's verses has been said to resemble Bob Dylan's "Subterranean Homesick Blues," while the song has also been compared to "Pump It Up" by Elvis Costello.

"Get On Your Boots" received mixed reviews, dividing critics. It peaked at number 12 in the UK charts in its first week of release. The song reached higher in the charts in Ireland, Scotland and Canada. Filmmaker Alex Courtes directed the song's music video, which featured footage of the band performing in front of a montage of political feminist imagery. It premiered on the Irish Independent website on 6 February 2009. U2 performed the song live to open the 51st Annual Grammy Awards and the 2009 Brit Awards.

== Composition and recording ==
Originally known as "Four Letter Word" and later as "Sexy Boots," "Get On Your Boots" originated as a demo that guitarist the Edge recorded at his home with the software GarageBand. The song went through many iterations, and at one point the main guitar riff was dropped, leading producer Steve Lillywhite to describe it as "a Beck B side" that could have been cut from the album. Throughout the documentary It Might Get Loud, the Edge is shown working on the song's guitar riffs, while experimenting with their sounds and effects.

"Get On Your Boots" was one of several songs recorded by a fan outside of Bono's house during the No Line on the Horizon sessions. The clip was subsequently uploaded to YouTube, but removed at the request of Universal Music.

Thematically, the song is about Bono taking his family on vacation to France and witnessing warplanes flying overhead at the start of the Iraq War; some of the lyrics are from the perspective of a man writing a letter to his first love as he relates witnessing the same event. The "let me in the sound" chant was developed comparatively late in the recording sessions. It was also used in the opening section of "Fez – Being Born." "Get On Your Boots" was one of three songs that the band were considering to open the album with, along with "Fez – Being Born" and "No Line on the Horizon." "No Line on the Horizon" was eventually chosen.

At a speed of 150 beats per minute, "Get On Your Boots" is one of the fastest songs the band have ever recorded. It was described by Q magazine as "demented electro grunge employs a proto-rock n'roll riff, but propelled into the future, before taking a sudden hip-hop twist midway through." Rolling Stone magazine has called it a "blazing, fuzzed-out rocker that picks up where 'Vertigo' left off." Hot Press described the song as "[...] a thoroughly contemporary, intense electro grunge exercise, with Adam Clayton's powerful bass to the fore, which mixes hip hop influences with shades of the Rolling Stones, Queen, Bob Dylan and the Beatles."

The song was remixed by the French duo Justice and Italian duo Crookers.

== Release ==
A bootlegged, early version of the song was partly released to YouTube during the band's recording sessions at the French resort of Èze. The poor quality version was subsequently removed from the site at the behest of the band's record label, Universal Records. Media reports in August 2008 originally referred to the song by the title "Sexy Boots," and later as "Get Your Boots On." It was later revised to "Get on Your Boots."

"Get On Your Boots" was scheduled to receive its world radio premiere on The Colm & Jim-Jim Breakfast Show on the Irish radio station RTÉ 2fm at 8:10 on 19 January 2009 by the band's long-time friend and favoured disc-jockey Dave Fanning. However, after a nearly 30 second sample of the song was leaked onto the Internet, the song was made available in the iTunes Store for purchase an hour before its first play by Fanning, and the band decided to begin streaming the song on U2.com later that day. The single received a physical release on 14 February The B-side, "No Line on the Horizon 2," is an altered version of the album's title track.

== Music video ==
A scene from the "Get on Your Boots" music video.

The music video was directed by Alex Courtes, who previously co-directed the music videos for "Vertigo" and "City of Blinding Lights." The video features footage of the band performing the song in front of a background consisting of collages of military, astronomy, and female imagery. The video footage of the band was shot in London. The Edge stated that the video is about letting women take over because "men have fucked things up so badly, politically, economically, and socially."

The video was scheduled to premiere on the Irish Independent website on 30 January 2009, but this was later delayed. Universal Music issued a statement saying that the video had not been completed in time for its scheduled airing. Images from a leaked version of the video had Getty Images watermarks on them, indicating unresolved copyright issues. The finished version of the video premiered at 17:00 UTC on Friday, 6 February on the newspaper's website.

== Live performances ==
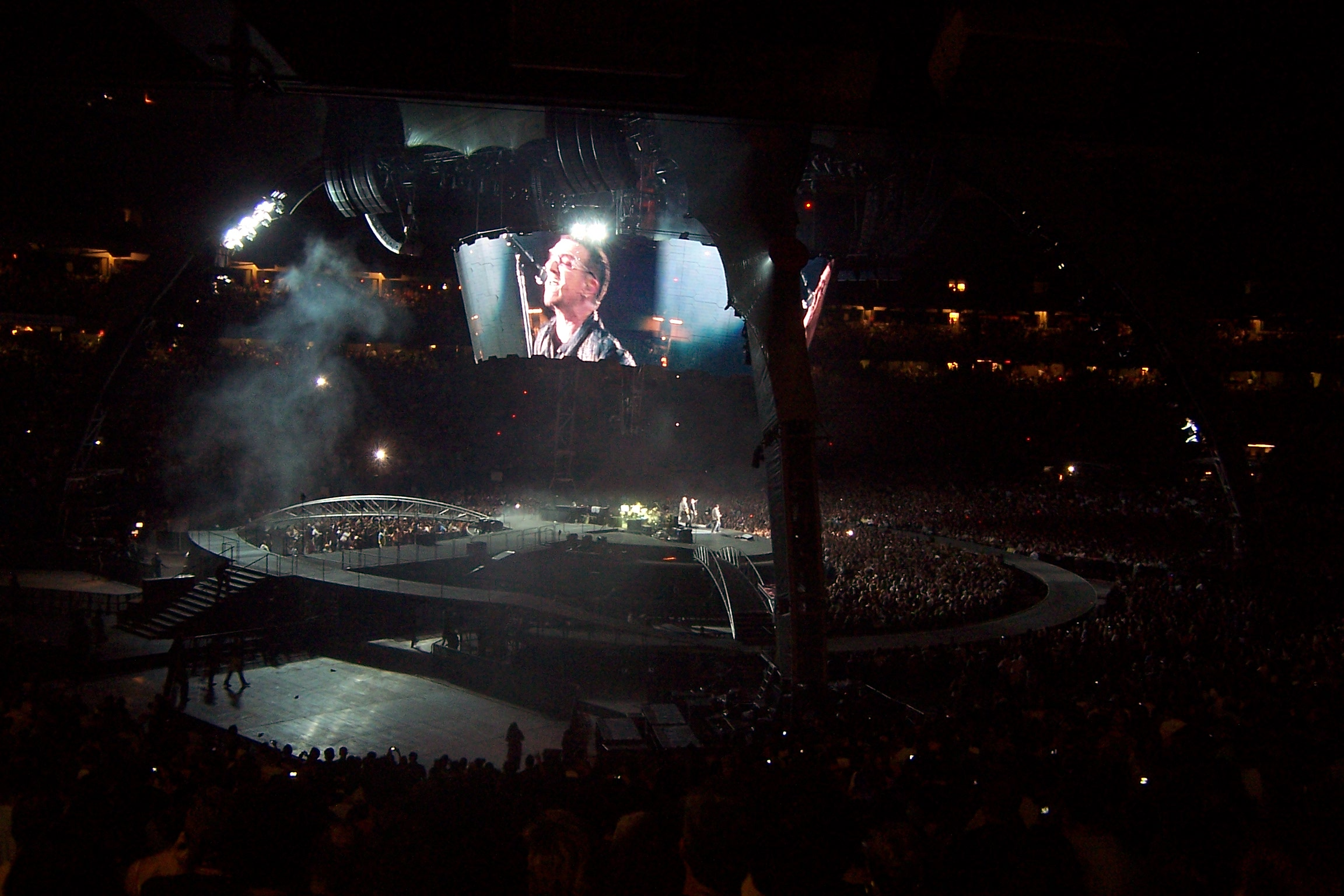
The lighting design and performance style of "Get On Your Boots" during the U2 360° Tour.

U2 played "Get On Your Boots" to open the 2009 Grammy Awards and the 2009 BRIT Awards. It was performed at every show of the U2 360° Tour, with the song usually being placed near the start of the show.

On the TV show Spectacle: Elvis Costello with..., Bono, the Edge and Costello performed a medley of "Pump It Up" and "Get on Your Boots," alternating between the two songs.

== Reception ==
"Get On Your Boots" received a mixed response from critics. It was favourably received by Billboard, which stated that "the song is upbeat and energetic, and its instantaneous chart success (the first No. 1 Triple A debut in Nielsen BDS history and a top 10 debut at Modern Rock) shows that U2's popularity hasn't waned one iota." Blender said "'Get On Your Boots' is a manic low-end rocker a la 'Vertigo,' with phased ’70s-style synths, buzzing guitar and a breathless vocal from Bono that brings back fond memories of the days when the Edge tried to rap." Allmusic wasn't happy with the song, saying "Contrary to the suggestion of the clanking, sputtering first single 'Get On Your Boots' – its riffs and 'Pump It Up' chant sounding like a cheap mashup stitched together in GarageBand – [No Line on the Horizon] isn't a garish, gaudy electro-dalliance in the vein of Pop." Brian Hiatt of Rolling Stone would call the song "energetic, but cluttered".

In an interview with Rolling Stone, Adam Clayton stated his thoughts as to why "Get On Your Boots" had such a mixed response: "Interestingly, it's going off live. I think probably what happened was it's a common U2 problem. I think we probably worked on it and worked on it and worked on it, and instead of executing one idea well, I think we had probably five ideas in the song, and it just confused people. They weren't sure what they were hearing." Drummer Larry Mullen Jr. disliked releasing "Get On Your Boots" as the album's lead single, saying that it was a "catastrophic choice" and that it was "the beginning of the end. We never recovered from it," referring to the commercial disappointment of No Line on the Horizon and the band eventually playing fewer songs from the album. Clayton would later attribute the song's lukewarm response to both the album's reception and the band playing fewer songs from the album as the 360º Tour went on, saying, "the single didn't work, and when the single doesn't work people don't have a way into the record."

The song entered the Billboard Hot 100 Top 40 in its debut week, becoming their final top-40 single there, fell to number 96 the following week, then off the chart. However, it did become their 16th top-five Modern Rock Tracks hit, debuting in the Top 10, and peaking at number five. It also became their first Top 10 single on this chart since "All Because of You" in 2005. In the UK, "Get On Your Boots" reached number 12, marking the band's 40th UK Top 40 single and their 39th single to enter the UK Top 20. However, its underperformance broke a string of 14 consecutive UK Top 5 singles for U2. On its second week, the single dropped to number 20 on the UK Singles Chart, then to number 30 before leaving the chart; it remained in the UK Top 100 only for five weeks. In Scotland, the song performed better, peaking atop the Scottish Singles Chart on 22 February 2009, becoming U2's seventh chart-topper in that country. "Get On Your Boots" made a "Hot Shot Debut" at number three on the Canadian Hot 100 for the week of 7 February based on the large number of downloads, making it the band's 12th top five hit in the country.

== Formats and track listings ==
7" single (#1798673) CD single (#1798676)
No.	Title	Length
1.	"Get On Your Boots"	3:24
2.	"No Line on the Horizon 2"	4:05

CD single with video link (#1798675)
No.	Title	Length
1.	"Get On Your Boots"	3:24
2.	"No Line on the Horizon 2"	4:08
3.	"Get On Your Boots" (Video)	3:31

== Personnel ==
Personnel taken from No Line on the Horizon CD booklet, and Sound on Sound.

U2

- Bono – vocals
- The Edge – guitar
- Adam Clayton – bass guitar
- Larry Mullen Jr. – drums, percussion

Additional performers

- Brian Eno – rhythm loops
- Terry Lawless – keyboards
- Sam O'Sullivan – additional percussion

Technical

- Brian Eno – production
- Daniel Lanois – production
- Declan Gaffney – additional production, additional engineering, mixing
- Richard Rainey – engineering
- Carl Glanville – additional engineering
- John Davis – mastering

== Charts ==
=== Weekly charts ===
Chart (2009)	Peak position
Australia (ARIA)	26
Austria (Ö3 Austria Top 40)	11
Belgium (Ultratop 50 Flanders)	14
Belgium (Ultratop 50 Wallonia)	13
Canada Hot 100 (Billboard)	3
Canada Rock (Billboard)	1
Europe (European Hot 100)	6
France (SNEP)	6
Germany (GfK)	19
Hungary (Rádiós Top 40)	31
Hungary (Single Top 40)	2
Ireland (IRMA)	1
Italy (FIMI)	4
Japan Hot 100 (Billboard)	2
Netherlands (Dutch Top 40)	16
Netherlands (Single Top 100)	5
New Zealand (Recorded Music NZ)	20
Norway (VG-lista)	5
Portugal Digital Songs (Billboard)	2
Scotland Singles (Official Charts)	1
Spain (Promusicae)	20
Sweden (Sverigetopplistan)	8
Switzerland (Schweizer Hitparade)	65
UK Singles (Official Charts)	12
US Billboard Hot 100	37
US Adult Alternative Airplay (Billboard)	1
US Adult Pop Airplay (Billboard)	27
US Alternative Airplay (Billboard)	5
US Mainstream Rock (Billboard)	26
US Pop 100 (Billboard)	40
Venezuela Pop Rock (Record Report)	3

=== Year-end charts ===
Chart (2009)	Position
Belgium (Ultratop Wallonia)	96
Europe (European Hot 100)	99
France (SNEP)	86
Hungary (Mahasz)	143
Italy (FIMI)	100
Japan (Japan Hot 100)	32
Japan Adult Contemporary (Billboard)	6

== See also ==
- List of covers of U2 songs - Get on Your Boots
