= Joe Scaravella =

Italian-American restaurateur

- Born: Jody Scaravella mid-1950s Brooklyn, New York, United States
- Occupation: Restaurateur

Jody "Joe" Scaravella is an American restaurateur best known as the founder of Enoteca Maria, a restaurant named for his mother and located on Staten Island, New York. Established in 2007, the restaurant is known for its concept of featuring grandmothers ("nonnas") from around the world as rotating chefs, each preparing traditional homestyle meals from their native cuisines.

Scaravella and his restaurant are the subjects of the Netflix film Nonnas, directed by Stephen Chbosky, in which Vince Vaughn plays Scaravella.

== Early life ==
Jody Scaravella was born in Brooklyn, New York, in the mid-1950s, to Maria and her husband. As an adult, he worked for the Metropolitan Transportation Authority.

== Later life ==
Following the successive deaths of his grandfather, father, mother, grandmother, and sister, Scaravella entered a period of profound grief. With funds from his inheritance, he moved from Brooklyn to Staten Island, where he purchased a Dutch colonial house within walking distance of the Staten Island Ferry terminal. While exploring the area, he came across an empty storefront next to the St. George Theatre. Moved by the memory of his mother Maria, he decided to buy the space and open a restaurant as a tribute, which later became Enoteca Maria. To honour his Sicilian grandmother, Domenica, he recruited Italian grandmothers as chefs. He later extended his chef recruitment to non-Italian grandmothers.

Scaravella’s cookbook Nonna’s House features the first three grandmothers who cooked at Enoteca Maria when it opened, along with profiles of other grandmothers who have cooked at the restaurant throughout the years.
