= Alex Courtès =

French artist and filmmaker

Alex Courtès is a French artist and director of music videos and features.

== Career ==
After studying at Penninghen, he began his career by creating album artwork for French house musicians, such as Cassius, Daft Punk, and Air. He also designed Daft Punk's iconic helmets.

In 1999, he directed a music video for the duo Cassius and international artists such as Phoenix, Kylie Minogue, Sébastien Tellier, Jamiroquai, Franz Ferdinand, Justice, Kasabian and The White Stripes.

== Filmography ==
=== Fiction ===
- 2015- Au service de la France – Série Arte
- 2012- Les Infidèles - segments "Bernard", "Thibault", "Simon" et "Les Infidèles Anonymes"
- 2011- The Incident

=== Music videos ===
- 2018 - Sean Paul & Major Lazer - Tip Pon It
- 2017 - Justice - Pleasure (Live)
- 2017 - Cassius ft Cat Power & Pharrell Williams – Go Up
- 2014 - Kasabian - Bumblebeee
- 2013 - Jackson and His Computer Band - Dead Living Things
- 2012 - Willy Moon - Yeah Yeah
- 2012 - Sébastien Tellier - Cochon Ville
- 2012 - Justice - On'n'On
- 2009 - Alice in Chains - Check My Brain
- 2009 - U2 - Magnificent
- 2009 - U2 - Get on Your Boots
- 2008 - Kaiser Chiefs - Good Days Bad Days
- 2008 - Snow Patrol - Take Back the City
- 2006 - Kasabian - Shoot the Runner
- 2005 - Kylie Minogue - Giving You Up
- 2005 - Wolfmother - Woman
- 2005 - Jamiroquai - (Don't) Give Hate a Chance
- 2005 - U2 - City of Blinding Lights
- 2004 - U2 - Vertigo
- 2003 - Jane's Addiction - Just Because
- 2003 - The White Stripes - Seven Nation Army
- 2002 - Cassius - I am a Woman
- 2002 - Cassius - Sound of violence
- 2001 - Phoenix - If I Ever Feel Better
- 2001 - Air - Radio Number 1
- 1999 - Cassius - Cassius 99

=== Commercial ===
- 2019 Smart Energy GB - I Want
- 2016- Puma – Work, Win & Celebrate
- 2016- France television – Les Jeux Olympiques Rio 2016
- 2015- Lexus – Flow
- 2015- Paco Rabanne - 1 million
- 2015- Paco Rabanne - Olympea
- 2014- Paco Rabanne - Lady Million
- 2014- Carolina Herrera - 212
- 2013- Paco Rabanne - Invictus
- 2013- Peugeot – 208 GTI
- 2013- Adidas - Unite all originals

== Recognition ==
In 2005, Courtès won a Grammy Award for "Vertigo" by U2. In 2013, his Willy Moon video won the best pop video award at UK MVA. He was also nominated at D&AD.

In 2015, Courtès directed the first season of a TV show about the French secret service in the 1960s, Au service de la France and he was developing a feature thriller film.

In 2017, he directed music video "Go Up" for Cassius in teamwork with Pharrell Williams and Cat Power.

=== Nominations ===
- On’n’On, Justice

UK Video Music Awards 2012 | Best International Pop Video

- Cochon Ville, Sebastien Tellier

UK Video Music Awards 2012 | Best Pop Video Budget

=== Awards ===
- Yeah Yeah, Willy Moon

UK Video Music Awards 2013 | Best Pop Video

- Dead Living Things, Jackson & His Computer Band

Art Directors Club 2013 • In Book | Music Video

- Cochon Ville, Sebastien Tellier

Art Directors Club 2012 • In Book | Music Video
