= Tre Hale =

American actor and model (born 1992)

- Born: October 28, 1992 (age 34); Rancho Cucamonga, California, U.S.
- Education: Damien High School; University of California, Los Angeles (UCLA)
- Occupations: Actor; model
- Years active: 2017–present
- Known for: Nemesis; Platonic; All American; Love and Monsters
- Children: 1

Tre Hale (born 28 October 1992) is an American actor and model from Rancho Cucamonga, California, USA. His best known for portraying Andy in Platonic, Rocko in Love and Monsters and Daren "Stro" Stroman in Nemesis.

== Early life and education ==
Hale was born in Rancho Cucamonga, California, USA. He attended high school at Damien High School. While at high school he played football as a fullback. He was named Damien High School Defensive Player of the Year for 2009 season. He also participated in track and field he competed in the shot put and discus. He played college football at UCLA as fullback for 5 years.

== Career ==
=== 2017–2019 ===
Hale made his professional screen debut in 2017 in a small role as Scott in the TV series Lethal Weapon. He then continued to appear in other small roles such as in Oh Lucy!, A Crooked Somebody, NCIS: Los Angeles and Shameless.

=== 2020–2023 ===
In 2020, Hale played a supporting role in the movie Blood on Her Badge. He also appeared in the feature film Rocko in the same year. In 2021, Hale landed a role in National Champions, playing the role of Roc Meredith. In 2023, he landed roles in 5 A.M., Strange Planet, Magnum P.I. and a recurring role in Platonic.

=== 2024–present ===
In 2024, Hale played Brocko in the feature film The Real Bros of Simi Valley: The Movie and Dyrrl in the TV series Poppa's House. In 2026 he played the role of Stro on the TV series Nemesis. Nemesis was picked up for a second season by Netflix.

Hale will be part of the movie Empire City, which was filmed in Australia.

== Personal life ==
Hale is in a long-term relationship with model Tabria Majors. In 2023, they had a daughter.

== Filmography ==
=== Film ===
Year	Title	Role	Notes
2017	Oh Lucy!	Tattoo Guy	
2017	A Crooked Somebody	Sucker Inmate	
2020	Love and Monsters	Rocko	
2021	National Champions	Roc Meredith	
2023	5 A.M.	Erlik	Short film
2024	The Real Bros of Simi Valley: The Movie	Brocko	
2027	Snoop	Suge Knight	Filming
TBA	Empire City		Post-production

=== Television ===
Year	Title	Role	Notes
2017	Lethal Weapon	Scott	Episode: "Brotherly Love"
2017	NCIS: Los Angeles	Felix Swoope	Episode: "Plain Sight"
2017	Shameless	Tattoo Artist	Episode: "Where's My Meth?"
2020	Blood on Her Badge	Latrell	Television film
2023	Strange Planet	Various voices	Episode: "The Flying Machine"
2023	Magnum P.I.	Loto Aina	Episode: "Appetite for Danger"
2023–2024	All American	Kai	6 episodes
2023–present	Platonic	Andy	Recurring role
2025	Poppa's House	Dyrrl	Episode: "Babygirl"
2026	Nemesis	Darren "Stro" Stroman	8 episodes
