= Home safety =

Risks and potential dangers in and around a home

Home safety is the awareness of risks and potential dangers in and around a home that may cause bodily harm, injury, or even death to those living there.

== Common risks and safety practices ==
=== Carbon monoxide ===
Carbon monoxide (CO) detectors located in key areas inside the home is a preventative measure against CO poisoning. The gas is created during incomplete combustion in central heating boilers, as well as in open fires. Chimneys to such devices can become blocked, allowing the gas to enter living spaces. The odorless gas is toxic even in small amounts, and thus is a serious hazard. For multi-level homes, it is recommended to have a minimum of one carbon monoxide detector per floor. For added protection, CO detector are placed in other rooms, such as furnace or utility rooms.

=== Falling ===
Falling accidents at home are very common and can cause serious and life-threatening injuries, so prevention of slip and trip accidents is essential in the good design of living quarters. This objective is especially important for the elderly and disabled, who may have restricted movement and be more susceptible to hazards. It includes adequate supports such as handrails and balustrades as well as ensuring walking surfaces are of high friction and thus slip resistant. Lighting is also vital for being bright enough to enable the user to see obstacles when walking into a room, for example. Users may also be provided with a walking stick or crutches to aid walking and personal support. Fall prevention is an active form of protection for users.

=== Fire ===
Fire sprinklers offer a layer of protection because the sprinkler can respond to fire while it is still small. Fire sprinklers respond only the sprinkler closest to the heat source. Smoke alone will not set a fire sprinkler to discharge.

Fire extinguishers use a variety of substances to put out fires; dry powder, dry chemical, water, halogenated, carbon and foam. Since different substances burn differently, fire extinguishers are labeled (and often color-coded) according to the type or class of fire they can extinguish. It is, therefore, necessary to choose the correct fire extinguisher for home use. There are five different classes of fires; A, B, C, D, and K. Class A consists of burning paper, wood, cloth or other combustible solids. Class B consists of liquids and gasses such as propane. Class C fires consist of electrical fires. Class D fires (less common) consist of burning metal and class K fires (the most common) consist of kitchen type materials, i.e., grease and oil.

Fire alarms monitor the environmental changes associated with combustion. In most cases, once the alarm has been triggered by fire or smoke, a loud sound emanates to warn of danger or a message notifies the local fire department.

Smoke alarms, also known as smoke detectors, generally sound an audible and visual alarm. Smoke alarms are usually housed in a disk-shaped plastic enclosure about 6 inches in diameter and 1 inch thick and are often powered by a disposable battery. Instead, heat detectors are a device that responds to changes in ambient temperature. Heat detectors are not meant to replace smoke detectors. They are often placed in rooms where standard smoke detectors are not suitable, such as laundry rooms, garages, and attics.

According to the United States Department of Homeland Security's recommendations, fire escape plans are an essential tool in fire safety, and should include knowing two ways out of every room (in case one exit cannot be used) and a safe meeting place enough distant from home. For this purpose, DHS urges also to practice fire escape plans twice each year. When creating the fire escape plan, it is best to have a layout that shows each room and potential escape route in the home. The escape plan should be explained to children and care taken that they recognize the sound of the fire alarm and know to check the door for heat and how to stay low to the ground.

=== Mold ===
Molds are microscopic organisms that thrive in damp environments. They can be found on tiles and fabric, in bathrooms and kitchens, and in nearly any damp, warm place. Molds are usually not a problem indoors unless spores land on a wet or damp spot and begin growing.

Inhaling or touching mold or mold spores may cause allergic reactions in sensitive individuals. Symptoms may be similar to those of a high fever, and can include sneezing, runny nose, and red eyes. Preventative steps include moisture control in the home and drying water damage.

=== Poisoning ===
The number of the local poison control center can be kept readily available as a precautionary measure.

=== Radon ===
The two types of radon gas testing devices are passive and active. A kit can be set up in the home or a professional can be hired to perform the test. If the test result comes back with high concentrations of radon, there are proven ways to reduce radon gas and bring it to acceptable levels. One method uses a vent pipe system and fan, which pulls radon from beneath the house and vents it to the outside. This system, known as a soil suction radon reduction system, involves minor home renovations.

== Standards organizations ==
There are a number of organizations in the United States and other jurisdictions that release or maintain standards on the topic of home safety, including:

- Home Safety Council
- National Safety Council
- National Fire Safety Council
- Occupational Safety and Health Administration

== See also ==
- Occupational safety
