= Mel Jarnson =

Thai-Australian actress

- Born: Melanie Jarnson; Bangkok, Thailand
- Citizenship: Australia
- Occupation: Actress
- Years active: 2018–present

Melanie Jarnson is a Thai-born Australian actress. She starred in the video game adaptation films Mortal Kombat (2021) and Street Fighter (2026), in the roles of Nitara and Cammy, respectively.

== Early life ==
Jarnson was born in Bangkok to an Australian mother and a Thai father. She spent a large amount of her childhood in India and Belgium. She had lived in 6 different countries mainly attending French international schools. Due to the constant moving she said she struggled with her Thai-Australian identity. She is fluent in French, English and Thai. She moved to Australia in 2016 where she says she feels settled.

== Career ==
Jarnson made her feature film acting debut in the 2021 martial arts fantasy film Mortal Kombat where she portrayed Nitara. She was then cast in the action thriller film Blacklight. Jarnson then appeared in the Australian hostage comedy series Caught. Jarnson appeared in the American horror film Witchboard alongside Madison Iseman and Aaron Dominguez. In 2026, she played the role of Cammy in the martial arts comedy film Street Fighter.

== Filmography ==
=== Film ===
Key
| † | Denotes films that have not yet been released |

Film
| Year | Title | Role | Notes |
|---|---|---|---|
| 2019 | And Again, Her | | Short film |
| 2020 | Pretty Boy | | Short film |
| 2021 | Mortal Kombat | Nitara | |
| 2022 | Blacklight | Sofia Flores | |
| 2024 | Five Blind Dates | | |
| 2024 | Witchboard | Brooke | Credited as Melanie Jarnson |
| 2026 | Killer Whale | Trish Stevens | |
| 2026 | Street Fighter | Cammy | |
| TBA | Empire City † | Leda | |

=== Television ===
Television roles
| Year | Title | Role | Notes |
|---|---|---|---|
| 2019 | Harrow | | |
| 2020 | Between Two Worlds | | |
| 2023 | Caught | | |
| 2025 | Black Snow | | |
| 2025 | Granny Flat Comedy | | |
| 2025 | NCIS: Sydney | Nova (singer) | |
