= Parting Stone (company) =

American deathcare company

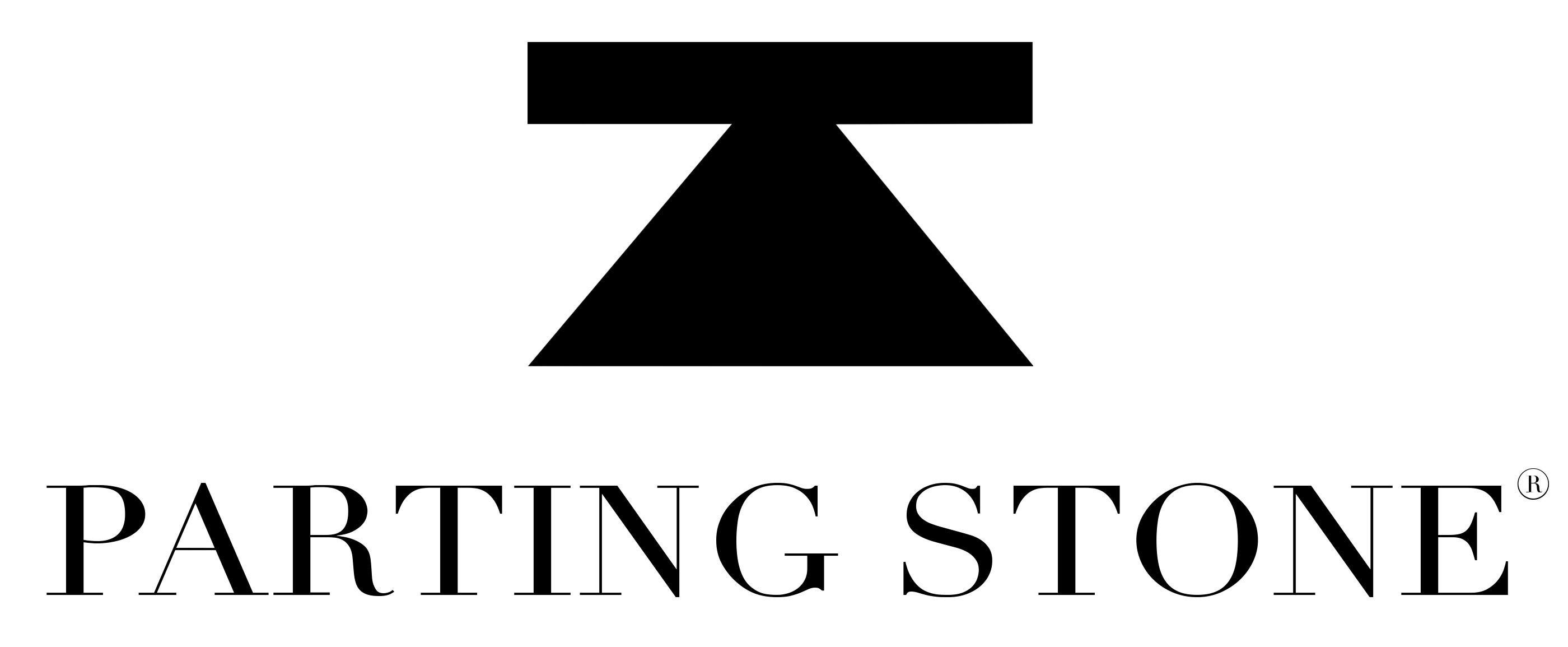
- Company type: Public benefit
- Industry: Deathcare
- Founded: 2019
- Founder: Justin Crowe
- Headquarters: Santa Fe, New Mexico, U.S.
- Area served: United States; Australia
- Key people: Justin Crowe (CEO)
- Products: Solidified cremated remains
- Website: partingstone.com

Parting Stone is an American deathcare company which processes cremated remains into solidified remains, an alternative to traditional ash resembling a collection of stones. It is based in Santa Fe, New Mexico.

== History ==
The concept for Parting Stone and solidified remains was developed by founder Justin Crowe following a personal experience with loose cremated remains in 2015. In 2018, the concept received an award from the Santa Fe BizMIX startup competition. Crowe subsequently obtained a research grant through the New Mexico Small Business Assistance Program to collaborate with material scientists at Los Alamos National Laboratory on a remains-solidification method. Parting Stone was formally founded as a public benefit corporation in 2019. In the same year Parting Stone received the ICCFA KIP Award.

In 2020, Parting Stone received an honorable mention in the World Changing Ideas Awards. In 2021, it placed second for the National Funeral Directors Association Innovation Award.

In January 2022, Parting Stone relocated to an 8,000-square-foot facility in Santa Fe. By mid-2022, the company had raised approximately $2 million in seed funding from investors including Lightspeed Venture Partners. In August 2022, it received a $150,000 LEDA grant from New Mexico’s economic development fund to support staff expansion.

Later in 2022, Australian funeral-services company InvoCare invested $1 million in Parting Stone.

On April 7 2023 Crowe appeared on the television program Shark Tank and secured an investment from Lori Greiner and Kevin O'Leary.

== Operations ==
Parting Stone's process is conducted at its Santa Fe laboratory. The solidification method involves removing metal artifacts from the ashes, refining the remains into a fine powder, and mixing the powder with a binding agent. This material is then shaped and fired in a kiln at high temperature to create a solid, ceramic-like material. After cooling and polishing, the solidified remains are returned to the family. The process typically takes eight weeks.

The quantity and appearance of the solidified remains vary. An average set of adult human remains yields 40 to 80 "stones," with sizes ranging from small pebbles to palm-sized pieces. The color is typically white or off-white, though natural variations in the material content of the remains can produce hues of blue, green, or yellow. No dyes are used. The finished solids are smooth and do not disintegrate in water. An analysis by Los Alamos National Laboratory indicated that, unlike conventional cremated remains, the solidified remains have a minimal impact on soil and water chemistry when scattered, suggesting that it is a more environmentally friendly option for scattering.
