= 15th Screen Actors Guild Awards =

- Awarded for: Outstanding motion picture and primetime television performances
- Date: January 25, 2009
- Location: Shrine Auditorium; Los Angeles, California
- Country: United States
- Presented by: Screen Actors Guild
- Website: www.sagawards.org

Television/radio coverage
- Network: TNT and TBS simultaneous broadcast

The 15th Annual Screen Actors Guild Awards, honoring the best achievements in film and television performances for the year 2008, were presented on January 25, 2009. The ceremony was held at the Shrine Exposition Center in Los Angeles, California for the thirteenth consecutive year. It was broadcast live simultaneously by TNT and TBS.

The nominees were announced on December 18, 2008, by Angela Bassett and Eric McCormack at Los Angeles' Pacific Design Center's Silver Screen Theater.

Doubt received the highest number of nominations among the film categories with five, four for individual performances and one for ensemble performance. In the television categories, Boston Legal, 30 Rock, John Adams, Mad Men and The Closer had the most nominations with three each.

The biggest winner of the evening was 30 Rock, which won in all three categories in which it was nominated. The Dark Knight won the most film awards, winning in both categories in which it was nominated.

== Winners and nominees ==
Winners are listed first and highlighted in boldface.

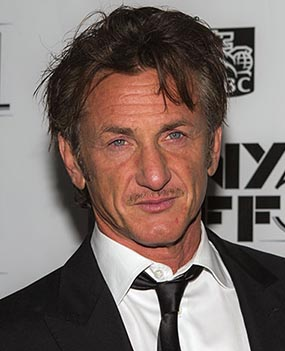
Sean Penn, Outstanding Performance by a Male Actor in a Leading Role winner

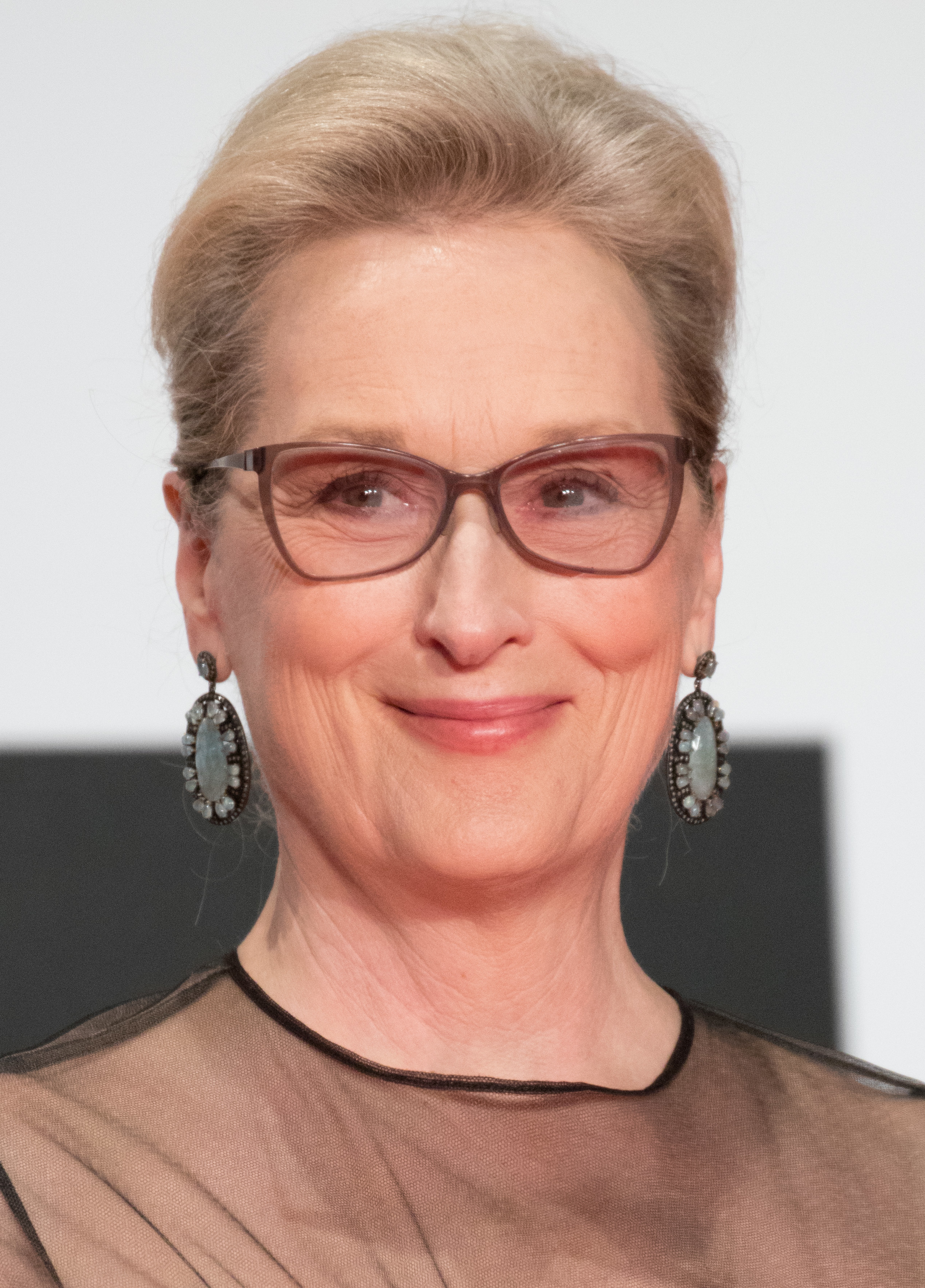
Meryl Streep, Outstanding Performance by a Female Actor in a Leading Role winner

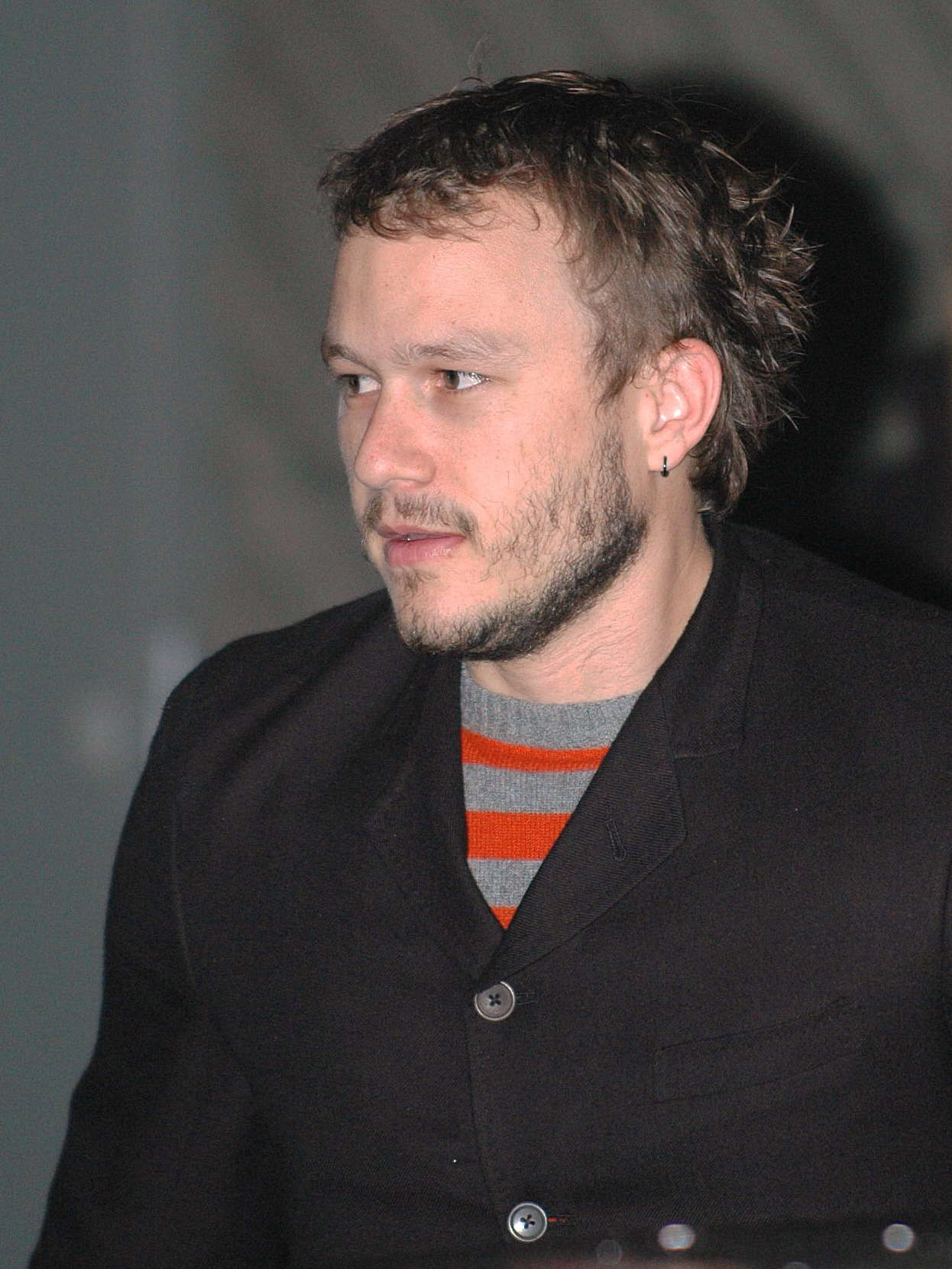
Heath Ledger, Outstanding Performance by a Male Actor in a Supporting Role winner

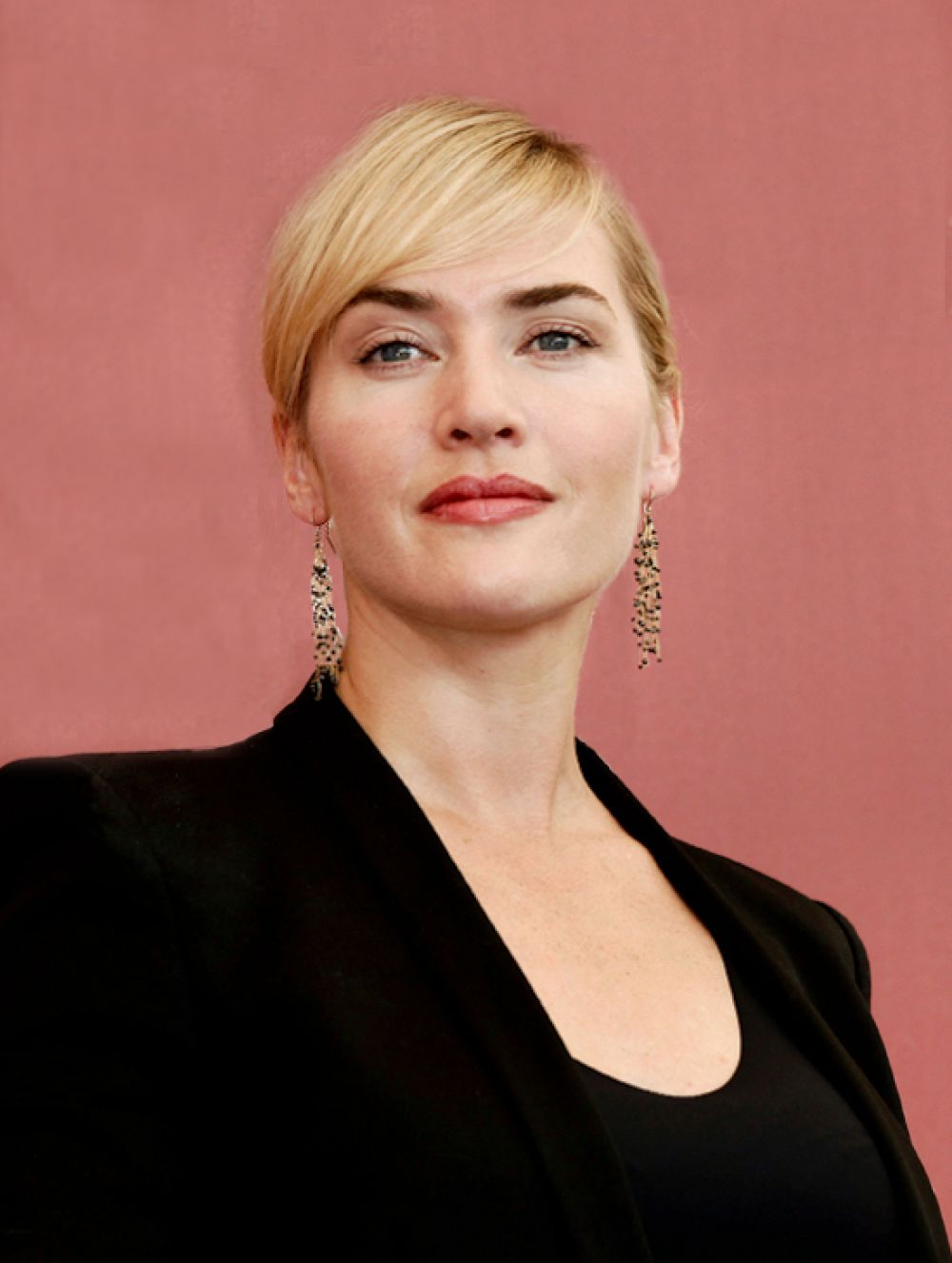
Kate Winslet, Outstanding Performance by a Female Actor in a Supporting Role winner

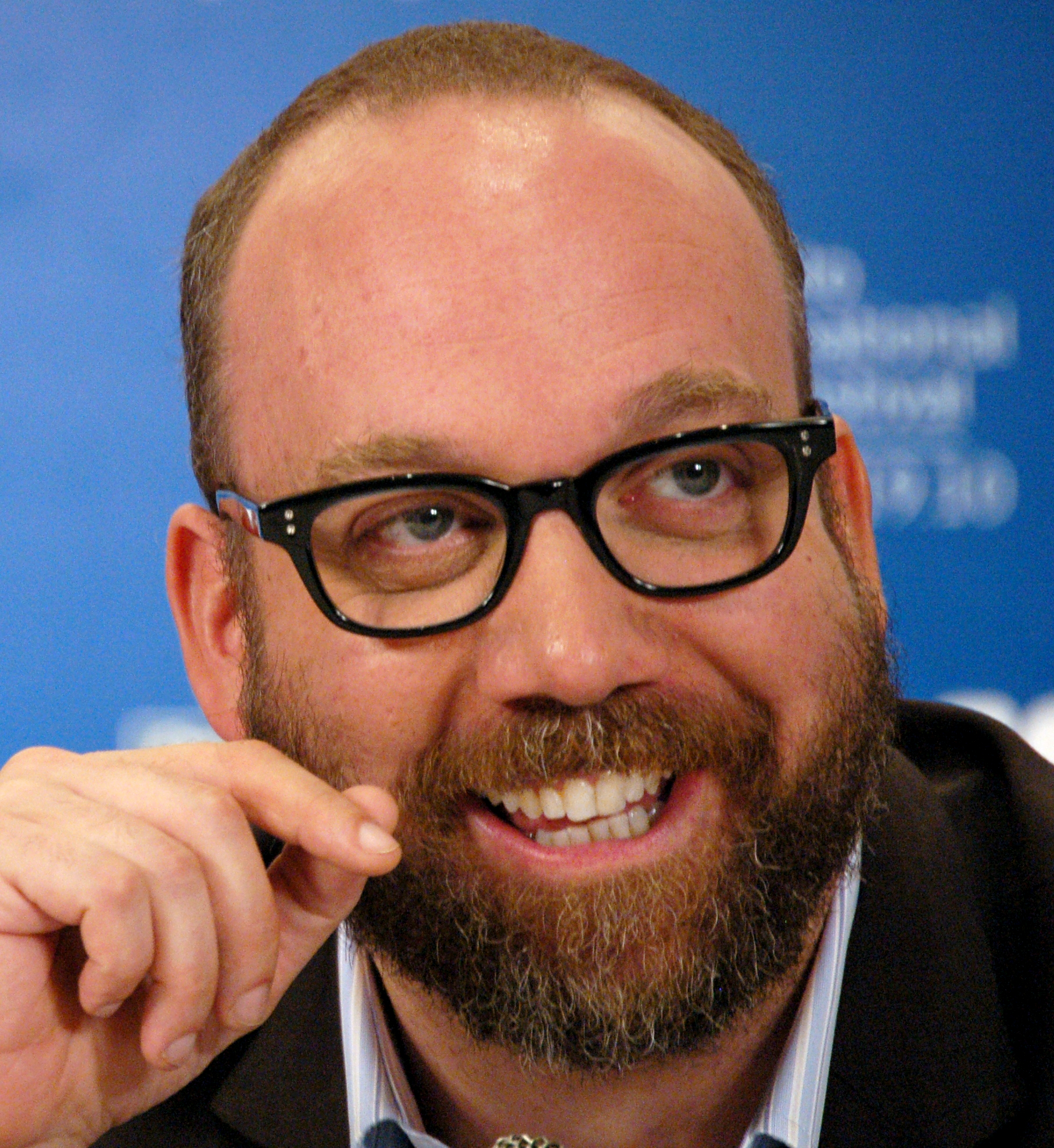
Paul Giamatti, Outstanding Performance by a Male Actor in a Miniseries or Television Movie winner

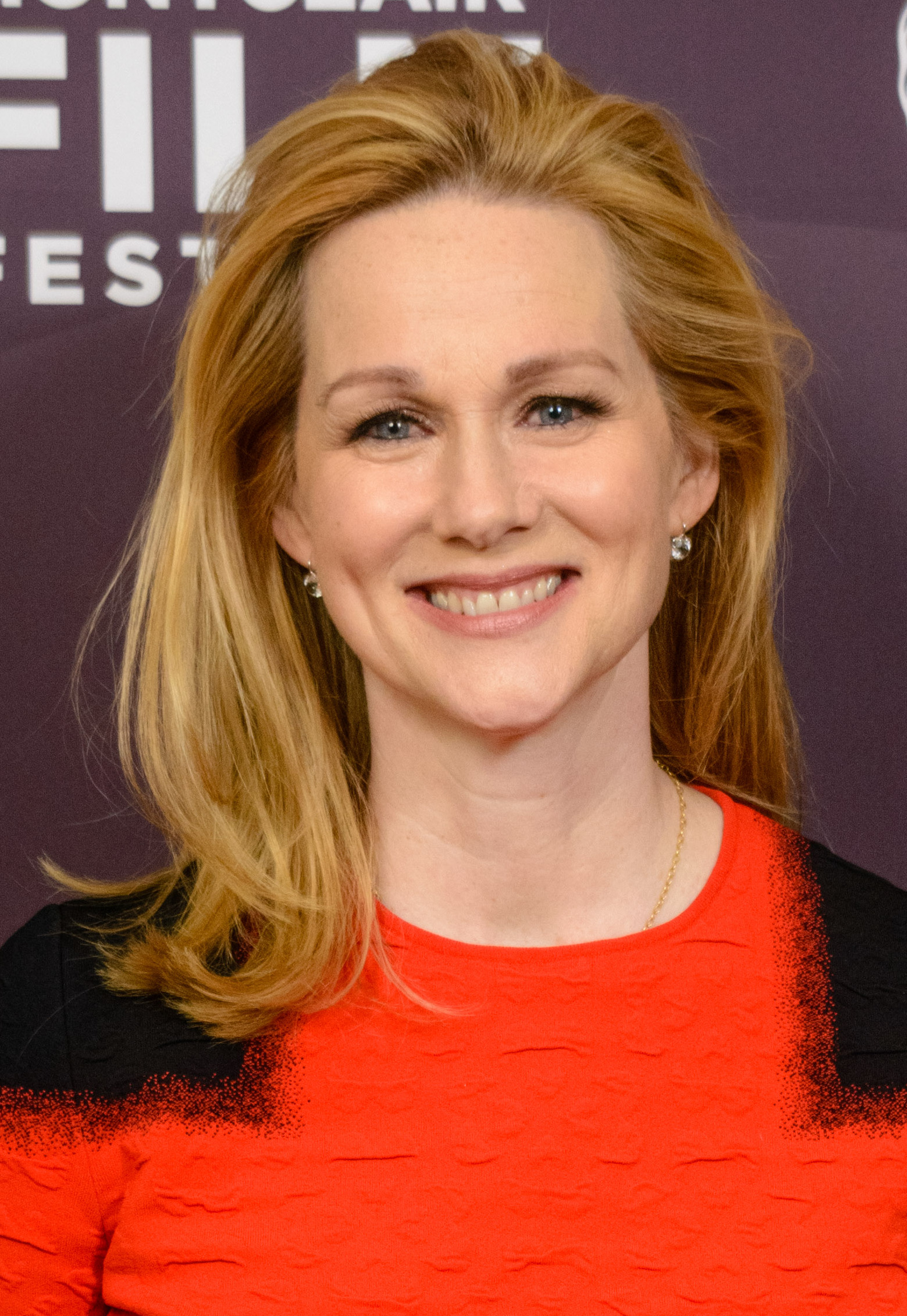
Laura Linney, Outstanding Performance by a Female Actor in a Miniseries or Television Movie winner

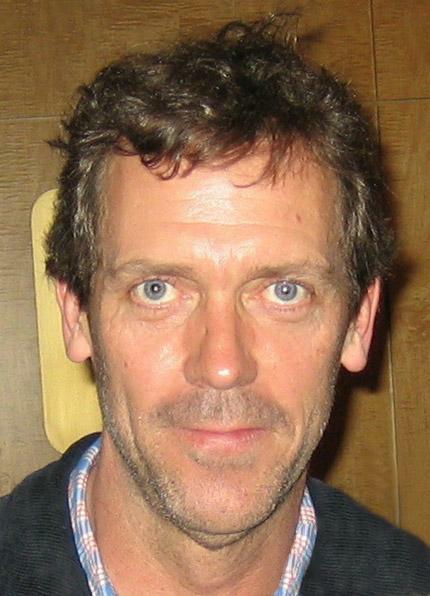
Hugh Laurie, Outstanding Performance by a Male Actor in a Drama Series winner

Sally Field, Outstanding Performance by a Female Actor in a Drama Series winner

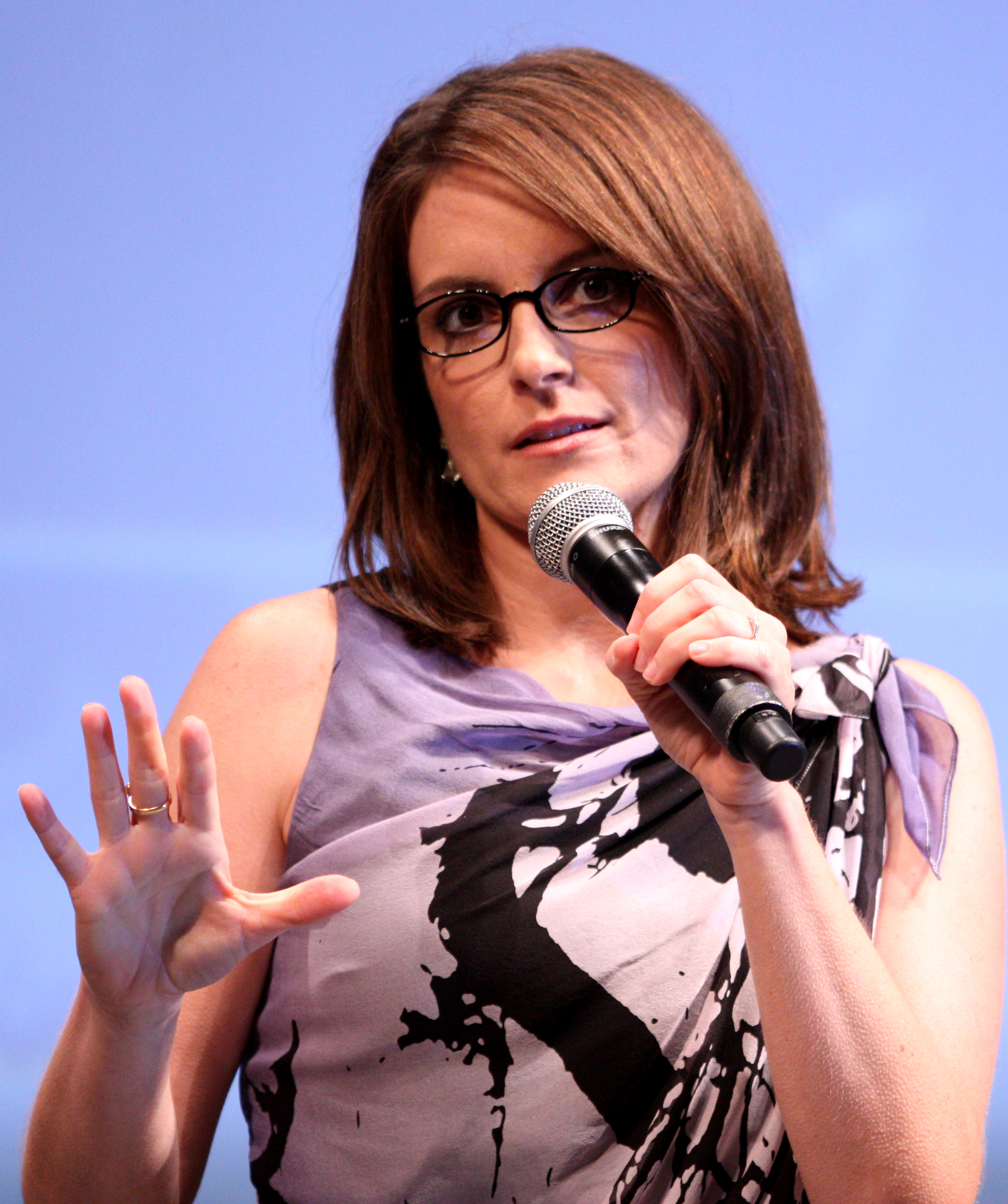
Tina Fey, Outstanding Performance by a Female Actor in a Comedy Series winner

=== Film ===
Outstanding Performance by a Male Actor in a Leading Role	Outstanding Performance by a Female Actor in a Leading Role
**Sean Penn – Milk as Harvey Milk**; Richard Jenkins – The Visitor as Walter Vale; Frank Langella – Frost/Nixon as Richard Nixon; Brad Pitt – The Curious Case of Benjamin Button as Benjamin Button; Mickey Rourke – The Wrestler as Randy "The Ram" Robinson	**Meryl Streep – Doubt as Sister Aloysius Beauvier**; Anne Hathaway – Rachel Getting Married as Kym; Angelina Jolie – Changeling as Christine Collins; Melissa Leo – Frozen River as Ray Eddy; Kate Winslet – Revolutionary Road as April Wheeler
Outstanding Performance by a Male Actor in a Supporting Role	Outstanding Performance by a Female Actor in a Supporting Role
**Heath Ledger – The Dark Knight as The Joker** (posthumous); Josh Brolin – Milk as Dan White; Robert Downey Jr. – Tropic Thunder as Kirk Lazarus; Philip Seymour Hoffman – Doubt as Father Brendan Flynn; Dev Patel – Slumdog Millionaire as Jamal Malik	**Kate Winslet – The Reader as Hanna Schmitz**; Amy Adams – Doubt as Sister James; Penélope Cruz – Vicky Cristina Barcelona as María Elena; Viola Davis – Doubt as Mrs. Miller; Taraji P. Henson – The Curious Case of Benjamin Button as Queenie
Outstanding Performance by a Cast in a Motion Picture
**Slumdog Millionaire – Rubina Ali, Tanay Chheda, Ashutosh Lobo Gajiwala, Azharuddin Mohammed Ismail, Anil Kapoor, Irrfan Khan, Ayush Mahesh Khedekar, Tanvi Ganesh Lonkar, Madhur Mittal, Dev Patel, and Freida Pinto**; The Curious Case of Benjamin Button – Mahershala Ali, Cate Blanchett, Jason Flemyng, Jared Harris, Taraji P. Henson, Elias Koteas, Julia Ormond, Brad Pitt, Phyllis Somerville, and Tilda Swinton; Doubt – Amy Adams, Viola Davis, Philip Seymour Hoffman, and Meryl Streep; Frost/Nixon – Kevin Bacon, Rebecca Hall, Toby Jones, Frank Langella, Matthew MacFadyen, Oliver Platt, Sam Rockwell, and Michael Sheen; Milk – Josh Brolin, Joseph Cross, James Franco, Victor Garber, Emile Hirsch, Diego Luna, Denis O'Hare, Sean Penn, and Alison Pill
Outstanding Performance by a Stunt Ensemble in a Motion Picture
**The Dark Knight**; Hellboy II: The Golden Army; Indiana Jones and the Kingdom of the Crystal Skull; Iron Man; Wanted

=== Television ===
Outstanding Performance by a Male Actor in a Miniseries or Television Movie	Outstanding Performance by a Female Actor in a Miniseries or Television Movie
**Paul Giamatti – John Adams (HBO) as John Adams**; Ralph Fiennes – Bernard and Doris (HBO) as Bernard Lafferty; Kevin Spacey – Recount (HBO) as Ron Klain; Kiefer Sutherland – 24: Redemption (Fox) as Jack Bauer; Tom Wilkinson – John Adams (HBO) as Benjamin Franklin	**Laura Linney – John Adams (HBO) as Abigail Adams**; Laura Dern – Recount (HBO) as Katherine Harris; Shirley MacLaine – Coco Chanel (Lifetime) as Coco Chanel; Phylicia Rashad – A Raisin in the Sun (ABC) as Lena Younger; Susan Sarandon – Bernard and Doris (HBO) as Doris Duke
Outstanding Performance by a Male Actor in a Drama Series	Outstanding Performance by a Female Actor in a Drama Series
**Hugh Laurie – House (Fox) as Dr. Gregory House**; Michael C. Hall – Dexter (Showtime) as Dexter Morgan; Jon Hamm – Mad Men (AMC) as Don Draper; William Shatner – Boston Legal (ABC) as Denny Crane; James Spader – Boston Legal (ABC) as Alan Shore	**Sally Field – Brothers & Sisters (ABC) as Nora Walker**; Mariska Hargitay – Law & Order: Special Victims Unit (NBC) as Det. Olivia Benson; Holly Hunter – Saving Grace (TNT) as Grace Hanadarko; Elisabeth Moss – Mad Men (AMC) as Peggy Olson; Kyra Sedgwick – The Closer (TNT) as Det. Brenda Leigh Johnson
Outstanding Performance by a Male Actor in a Comedy Series	Outstanding Performance by a Female Actor in a Comedy Series
**Alec Baldwin – 30 Rock (NBC) as Jack Donaghy**; Steve Carell – The Office (NBC) as Michael Scott; David Duchovny – Californication (Showtime) as Hank Moody; Jeremy Piven – Entourage (HBO) as Ari Gold; Tony Shalhoub – Monk (USA Network) as Adrian Monk	**Tina Fey – 30 Rock (NBC) as Liz Lemon**; Christina Applegate – Samantha Who? (ABC) as Samantha Newly; America Ferrera – Ugly Betty (ABC) as Betty Suarez; Mary-Louise Parker – Weeds (Showtime) as Nancy Botwin; Tracey Ullman – Tracey Ullman's State of the Union (Showtime) as Various characters
Outstanding Performance by an Ensemble in a Drama Series
**Mad Men (AMC) – Bryan Batt, Alison Brie, Michael Gladis, Jon Hamm, Aaron Hart, Christina Hendricks, January Jones, Vincent Kartheiser, Mark Moses, Elisabeth Moss, Kiernan Shipka, John Slattery, Rich Sommer, and Aaron Staton**; Boston Legal (ABC) – Candice Bergen, Saffron Burrows, Christian Clemenson, Taraji P. Henson, John Larroquette, William Shatner, James Spader, Tara Summers, and Gary Anthony Williams; The Closer (TNT) – G. W. Bailey, Michael Paul Chan, Raymond Cruz, Tony Denison, Robert Gossett, Phillip P. Keene, Gina Ravera, Corey Reynolds, Kyra Sedgwick, J. K. Simmons, and Jon Tenney; Dexter (Showtime) – Preston Bailey, Julie Benz, Jennifer Carpenter, Valerie Cruz, Kristin Dattilo, Michael C. Hall, Desmond Harrington, C. S. Lee, Jason Manuel Olazabal, David Ramsey, James Remar, Christina Robinson, Jimmy Smits, Lauren Vélez, and David Zayas; House (Fox) – Lisa Edelstein, Omar Epps, Peter Jacobson, Hugh Laurie, Robert Sean Leonard, Jennifer Morrison, Kal Penn, Jesse Spencer, and Olivia Wilde
Outstanding Performance by an Ensemble in a Comedy Series
**30 Rock (NBC) – Scott Adsit, Alec Baldwin, Katrina Bowden, Tina Fey, Judah Friedlander, Jane Krakowski, Jack McBrayer, Tracy Morgan, Maulik Pancholy, and Keith Powell**; Desperate Housewives (ABC) – Kendall Applegate, Andrea Bowen, Charlie Carver, Max Carver, Ricardo Antonio Chavira, Gary Cole, Marcia Cross, Dana Delany, James Denton, Lyndsy Fonseca, Rachel Fox, Teri Hatcher, Zane Huett, Felicity Huffman, Kathryn Joosten, Brent Kinsman, Shane Kinsman, Joy Lauren, Eva Longoria, Kyle MacLachlan, Neal McDonough, Joshua Moore, Shawn Pyfrom, Doug Savant, Nicollette Sheridan, and Brenda Strong; Entourage (HBO) – Kevin Connolly, Kevin Dillon, Jerry Ferrara, Adrian Grenier, Rex Lee, Jeremy Piven, and Perrey Reeves; The Office (NBC) – Leslie David Baker, Brian Baumgartner, Creed Bratton, Steve Carell, Jenna Fischer, Kate Flannery, Melora Hardin, Ed Helms, Mindy Kaling, Angela Kinsey, John Krasinski, Paul Lieberstein, B. J. Novak, Oscar Nuñez, Craig Robinson, Phyllis Smith, and Rainn Wilson; Weeds (Showtime) – Demián Bichir, Julie Bowen, Enrique Castillo, Guillermo Diaz, Alexander Gould, Allie Grant, Justin Kirk, Hemky Madera, Andy Milder, Kevin Nealon, Mary-Louise Parker, Hunter Parrish, Elizabeth Perkins, and Jack Stehlin
Outstanding Performance by a Stunt Ensemble in a Television Series
**Heroes (NBC)**; The Closer (TNT); Friday Night Lights (NBC); Prison Break (Fox); The Unit (CBS)

=== Screen Actors Guild Life Achievement Award ===
- James Earl Jones

== Multiple nominations ==
=== Film ===
Nominations	Film
5	Doubt
3	The Curious Case of Benjamin Button
3	Milk
2	The Dark Knight
2	Frost/Nixon
2	Slumdog Millionaire

=== Television ===
Nominations	Program
3	30 Rock
3	Boston Legal
3	The Closer
3	John Adams
3	Mad Men
2	Bernard and Doris
2	Dexter
2	Entourage
2	House
2	The Office
2	Recount
2	Weeds

== Multiple wins ==
=== Film ===
Wins	Film
2	The Dark Knight

=== Television ===
Wins	Program
3	30 Rock
2	John Adams

== In Memoriam ==
Susan Sarandon introduced a previously recorded "In Memoriam" segment which pay tribute to the actors who died last year:

- Charlton Heston
- Ivan Dixon
- Kim Chan
- Don S. Davis
- Majel Barrett
- David Groh
- Stanley Kamel
- Harvey Korman
- Edie Adams
- Paul Scofield
- Mel Ferrer
- Sam Bottoms
- Cyd Charisse
- Robert Prosky
- Robert DoQui
- Don LaFontaine
- Patrick McGoohan
- Christopher Allport
- Dick Martin
- Paul Benedict
- Gil Stratton
- Beverly Garland
- Sydney Pollack
- Isaac Hayes
- Evelyn Keyes
- Barry Morse
- John Phillip Law
- Ruth Cohen
- Ricardo Montalbán
- Augusta Dabney
- George Furth
- Van Johnson
- Bernie Mac
- Pat Hingle
- Don Galloway
- George Carlin
- Richard Widmark
- Estelle Getty
- Bernie Hamilton
- Roy Scheider
- Eartha Kitt
- Nina Foch
- Paul Newman
