= Slumdog Millionaire controversies =

Controversies surrounding the 2008 film Slumdog Millionaire

Slumdog Millionaire controversies refers to a range of criticisms, public disputes, and controversies surrounding the 2008 film Slumdog Millionaire. Directed by Danny Boyle and released to widespread international acclaim, the film won eight Academy Awards at the 81st Academy Awards and achieved significant commercial success. Despite this reception, the film generated debate in India and internationally regarding its portrayal of poverty in India, the use of religious imagery, and the treatment of some of the actors involved in the production.

Public criticism included comments by Indian film figures such as Amitabh Bachchan, whose blog posts about the film were widely reported as critical before he later clarified his position. The film also prompted legal complaints and protests from activists and community groups in India, some of whom argued that the title and depiction of Mumbai's slums reinforced negative stereotypes or amounted to "poverty porn". Hindu nationalist organisations additionally objected to the film's depiction of the Hindu god Rama.

Other controversies involved questions about the film's production and recognition. These included debate over the role and credit given to co-director Loveleen Tandan during the awards season, as well as criticism of the compensation and living conditions of child actors Azharuddin Mohammed Ismail and Rubina Ali after the film's success. The filmmakers stated that trust funds and educational support had been arranged for the children.

The film also faced a legal complaint concerning a historical inaccuracy involving the authorship of the song "Darshan Do Ghanshyam", which was incorrectly attributed in the film to the poet Surdas. These issues contributed to wider discussion about the film's cultural representation and ethical implications following its global success.

== Amitabh Bachchan ==
One of the first celebrities to discuss the film was Bollywood megastar Amitabh Bachchan, from whom young Jamal eagerly seeks an autograph shortly after the beginning of the film and who was the original presenter for Kaun Banega Crorepati, the Indian version of Who Wants to Be a Millionaire? On 13 January 2009 Bachchan wrote that in another part of his blog there were "comments for the film SlumDog Millionaire" which, as he noted, indicated "anger by some on its contents." Bachchan also wrote: "It's just that the SM idea authored by an Indian and conceived and cinematically put together by a Westerner, gets creative Globe recognition. The other would perhaps not." These remarks were widely reported on by the press in India and abroad as a criticism of the film.

In a later blog entry, Bachchan stated that his remarks had been misconstrued. He wrote: "Fact is – some one mentioned the film on my blog...I merely put both of them up and invited debate [...] Media, in India has taken the pros and cons of OTHERS, as MINE, built their headlines and put it safely out, thereby, causing the consternation." In another entry, Bachchan also wrote that Anil Kapoor invited him by phone to the premiere of the film. During the same phone call, Bachchan spoke with Danny Boyle, whom he described as "gracious and complimentary to me and my work." Bachchan stated that he offered his "apologies" to Boyle for the critical comments "created by media" but attributed to him, and he noted that Boyle "understands and acknowledges my calling him." Following the film's release in India on 23 January 2009, Bachchan called the movie "wonderful" and praised the fact that A.R. Rahman had received three Oscar nominations. Bachchan wrote: "I feel this win by Rahman and Rasool is most deserving and feel extremely proud to be an Indian."

== Gopal Singh Nepali ==
The author of the song "Darshan Do Ghanshyam" (Hindi: दर्शन दो घनश्याम) is said in the film to be the blind poet Surdas. However, the song is originally from the movie Narsi Bhagat (1957) written by Gopal Singh Nepali. His children have filed a complaint about the incorrect portrayal.

== Loveleen Tandan ==
On 11 December 2008, the day Golden Globe nominations were announced, Chicago film critic Jan Lisa Huttner launched an online campaign questioning why Loveleen Tandan, the film's credited co-director, was not nominated along with Danny Boyle for Best Director. "Knowing that Loveleen Tandan was a critical part of Slumdog's filmmaking and marketing phases," she wrote, "how can we all sit by and watch while she's totally ignored in the awards phase?" Huttner also provided statistics showing "how rare it is for female directors to be in the awards race."

After learning of this campaign, Tandan sought to end it, stating, "I can't tell you how embarrassed I am by this [...] The suggestion is highly inappropriate, and I am writing to you to stress that I would not wish it to be considered."

Slumdog Millionaire's producer Christian Colson stated that Tandan's role as co-director was being misconstrued to place her on an equal creative footing with Boyle. Colson noted that the title of "co-director (India)" given to Tandan was "strange but deserved" and was developed over "a Coca Cola and a cup of tea" in order to identify her as "one of our key cultural bridges."

Colson's remarks triggered negative feedback from multiple organisations including WomenArts, the Women Film Critics Circle, and the Women's Media Center. Eventually, even though she was not present at any prior ceremonies (including Golden Globes, BAFTA, or DGA), Tandan was a member of the team which went up on stage to accept the Oscar for Best Picture of 2009.

On 15 May 2010, Jan Lisa Huttner received a "Silver Feather" award from the Illinois Woman's Press Association commending her for her work on the 2009 Oscar controversy.

== Protests and lawsuits ==
Following its release in India, the film faced criticism from various members of the public alleging that the film fuels Western stereotypes about poverty in India and that it peddles "poverty porn". Tapeshwar Vishwakarma, a representative of a slum-dwellers' welfare group, filed a defamation lawsuit against the film's music composer A.R. Rahman and actor Anil Kapoor, alleging that grim depiction of slum dwellers violated their human rights. Vishwakarma's filing argued that the very title of the movie is derogatory, and he was particularly displeased that Indians associated with the film did not object to the use of word "slumdog." Nicholas Almeida, a social activist working in Mumbai, organized a protest against the film on the grounds that it intentionally exploited the poor for the purposes of profit, also arguing that the title Slumdog Millionaire is offensive, demeaning, and insulting to their dignity. The protesters were Mumbai slum dwellers who objected to the film's title and held up signs reading: "I am not a dog." Slum dwellers in Patna, the capital of the Indian state of Bihar, also protested against the movie, with the campaign reaching a climax on 26 January 2009, when "protesters tore down posters and ransacked a movie theatre" screening the film. The following day, the police in Bihar tightened security "outside theatres in the state to thwart any further attacks." Activists stated that slum dwellers would continue to protest until the film's director deleted the word "dog" from the title.

Newsweek magazine asked the film's director, Danny Boyle: "Some activists have claimed that the title is demeaning. What did you mean by 'slumdog'?" Boyle answered: "This is one of the saddest things for me.... Basically [the title] is a hybrid of the word "underdog"—and everything that means in terms of rooting for the underdog and validating his triumph—and the fact that he obviously comes from the slums. That's what we intended."

The Hindu organisations Hindu Janjagruti Samiti (HJS) and Shiv Sena protested against the film for its portrayal of the Hindu God Rama. An HJS spokesman stated that the film's portrayal of Rama is derogatory and "hurts the sentiments of Hindus." Writing for the conservative Daily Pioneer, Kanchan Gupta reiterated the objections of the activist groups that the film provides a one-sided portrayal of the complexities of religious conflict in India, and that the film depicts Hindus as "rapacious monsters".

== Child actors still living in slums ==
According to the London newspaper The Daily Telegraph, Azharuddin Mohammed Ismail (who played Salim as a child) was paid £1,700 during filming, while according to The Economic Times of India, he was paid £700 and Rubina Ali (who played Latika as a child) received £500 for a month's work on the film. The children received considerably less than the Afghan child stars of The Kite Runner, who had been paid £9,000, even though The Kite Runner was far less of a box office hit. At the end of filming for the movie, both of the child actors continued to live in makeshift shacks in the illegal slums of Bandra, a suburb of Mumbai, according to The Daily Telegraph and ABC News.

On 26 January 2009, Danny Boyle (director) and Christian Colson (producer) released a written statement saying that they had "paid painstaking and considered attention to how Azhar and Rubina's involvement in the film could be of lasting benefit to them over and above the payment they received for their work." Boyle and Colson stated that they had "set up trust funds for Rubina and Azharuddin and paid for their education." The filmmakers noted that they had also hired transportation to get the children to a non-profit English-language school for the next eight years, and that both children would receive £20 a month for books and food. The exact amount of the trust funds was not disclosed by the filmmakers. As Boyle explained: "We don't want to reveal exact figures about what's in the trust fund, what's in the bank account for them for when they leave school because it will make them vulnerable and a target really, but it is substantial, and they will hopefully gain benefit from the film long after the film has disappeared and long after the media who are chasing them at the moment sadly have lost interest in the film, and that's been our approach throughout and I think it's the right approach." According to The Economic Times, £17,500 had been placed into a trust fund for Azharuddin Mohammed Ismail which he will receive, plus interest, when he turns 18.

Azharuddin Mohammed Ismail's father, Mohammed Ismail, demanded more money for his son in light of the film's success. He stated: "My son has taken on the world and won. I am so proud of him but I want more money. They promised me a new house but it hasn't happened. I'm still in the slum. I want the money now, it is of no use later. Mr. Boyle should take care of my son." He also claimed: "There is none of the money left. It was all spent on medicines to help me fight TB." Defenders of the filmmakers noted that there was no assurance that any money given directly to Azharuddin Mohammed Ismail would not be used by his father for his own purposes, as had happened with previous Indian child actors from slums.

Both Azharuddin Mohammed Ismail and Rubina Ali attended the 81st Academy Awards on 22 February 2009, along with all the other actors who had played Salim, Jamal, and Latika. Azharuddin Mohammed Ismail was accompanied by his mother, Shameem Ismail, while Rubina Ali was accompanied by her uncle. On 25 February 2009, the Maharashtra Housing and Area Development Authority announced that both Azharuddin and Rubina would be given "free houses" so that they would no longer have to live in the Mumbai slum of Garib Nagar. The filmmakers stated that they had hired local social workers to facilitate this move for the children's families. In the wake of Azharuddin Mohammed Ismail and Rubina Ali's newfound relative affluence, the pressures upon them from the adults in their lives increased. Rubina Ali's custody became an issue, as her biological mother tried to gain custody from the stepmother who had raised her, apparently to get access to Rubina Ali's funds and improved lifestyle. The British tabloids reported that Rubina was also "offered up for sale by her father". The allegation has been denied by the father, who alleges that the British media has misrepresented his position and libelled him. He made a public statement decrying these accusations shortly thereafter, saying:

"My children are with me, and I could give my life for them," ... "I will never sell them to anybody, no matter how much money they offer me."

Authorities in India have conducted an investigation and have found no evidence to support the charges made by the British tabloids.

More than two years after the movie's release in London, Rubina Ali continued to live in an illegal slum in Gharib Nagar.

On 14 May 2009, the Mumbai Municipal Corporation demolished the illegal slums where Azharuddin Mohammed Ismail was living. On 7 July 2009 The Guardian reported that Azharuddin Mohammed Ismail and his mother had been given a new home. "I was shocked when I saw this house," Azhar is reported to have said, adding "I want to thank Danny Boyle for giving us this flat."
