= Reactions from India and the Indian diaspora to Slumdog Millionaire =

The 2008 film Slumdog Millionaire has been a subject of discussion among a variety of people in India and the Indian diaspora. Some film critics have responded positively to the film. At the same time, others objected to issues such as Jamal's use of British English or the fact that similar films by Indian filmmakers have not received equal recognition. A few notable filmmakers such as Aamir Khan and Priyadarshan have been critical of the film. Author and critic Salman Rushdie argues that it has "a patently ridiculous conceit."

== Reception from film critics ==
The film received positive reviews from many Indian film critics, though some were negative and others mixed. According to All Bollywood, the film has an average rating of 81% based on an aggregate of 25 reviews from Indian film critics. It was praised by Nikhat Kazmi of the Times of India who referred to Slumdog Millionaire as "a piece of riveting cinema, meant to be savoured as a Cinderella-like fairy tale, with the edge of a thriller and the vision of an artist." She also argued against criticism of the film, stating: "it was never meant to be a documentary on the down and out in Dharavi. And it isn't." Renuka Vyavahare of Indiatimes suggested that "the film is indeed very Indian" and that it is "one of the best English films set in India and revolving around the country’s most popular metropolis Mumbai." Kaveree Bamzai of India Today called the film "feisty" and argued that it is "Indian at its core and Western in its technical flourish." Anand Giridharadas argued in The New York Times that the film has a "freshness" which "portrays a changing India, with great realism, as something India long resisted being: a land of self-makers, where a scruffy son of the slums can, solely of his own effort, hoist himself up, flout his origins, break with fate." Giridharadas also called the film "a tribute to the irrepressible self." Poorna Shetty stated in The Guardian that "Boyle's depiction of Mumbai is spot on." She further stated that the film displays the "human aspect of the slums and the irrepressible energy and life force of the place" and offers "a breathing snapshot of the city that is always stripped of its warmth when depicted in the news." Khalid Mohamed gave the film a rave review and a 5-star rating.

Others were more critical of the film. One common complaint was directed towards Patel's use of British English which was never explained within the context of the film. In referring to this issue, Mukul Kesavan of The Telegraph (Kolkata) stated that the film is "a hybrid so odd" (due to the decision to have the first third in Hindi and the remainder in English) "that it becomes hard for the Indian viewer to ... suspend disbelief" and that "the transition from child actors who in real life are slum children to young actors who are, just as clearly, middle-class anglophones is so abrupt and inexplicable that it subverts the 'realism' of the brilliantly shot squalor in which their lives play out." Furthermore, Gautaman Bhaskaran argued that although the film was shot in India, it is not Indian in character. He questioned the "euphoria in India" after the film's release there, arguing that with a few exceptions, "there is nothing Indian about this film." He concluded that the film has "very little substance" and is "superficial and insensitive."

A more contentious argument lay in the assertion that Indians have already made better and more realistic films about poverty and corruption in India. Subhash K. Jha, author of "The Essential Guide to Bollywood", remarked that this territory has already been covered by Indian filmmakers (Mira Nair in Salaam Bombay and Satyajit Ray in the Apu Trilogy). Similarly, Soutik Biswas of the BBC argued that Slumdog Millionaire is an imitation of Indian films that have been "routinely ignored," suggesting that "if you are looking for gritty realism set in the badlands of Mumbai, order a DVD of a film called Satya by Ram Gopal Varma. The 1998 feature on an immigrant who is sucked into Mumbai's colourful underworld makes Slumdog look like a slick, uplifting MTV docu-drama." Matthew Schneeberger, an American working as a journalist in India, opined:

"Say an Indian director travelled to New Orleans for a few months to film a movie about Jamal Martin, an impoverished African American who lost his home in Hurricane Katrina, who once had a promising basketball career, but who -- following a drive-by shooting -- now walks with a permanent limp, whose father is in jail for selling drugs, whose mother is addicted to crack cocaine, whose younger sister was killed by gang-violence, whose brother was arrested by corrupt cops, whose first born child has sickle cell anaemia, and so on. The movie would be widely panned and laughed out of theatres."

Finally, a fourth argument is that a "happy ending" film about slum-dwellers is inherently misleading. For example, Sudip Mazumdar of Newsweek wrote:

"People keep praising the film's 'realistic' depiction of slum life in India. But it's no such thing. Slum life is a cage. It robs you of confidence in the face of the rich and the advantaged. It steals your pride, deadens your ambition, limits your imagination and psychologically cripples you whenever you step outside the comfort zone of your own neighborhood. Most people in the slums never achieve a fairy-tale ending."

== Reception from filmmakers and actors ==
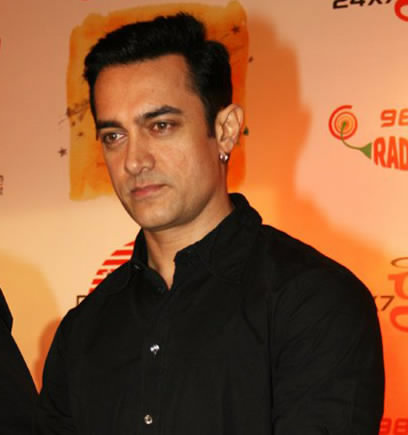
Aamir Khan viewed Slumdog Millionaire as "not an Indian film".

In an interview after the Oscars, actor and filmmaker Aamir Khan stated that he did not "see Slumdog ... as an Indian film. I think it is a film about India like Gandhi (that) was made by Sir Richard Attenborough. Similarly, Slumdog... is about India but it is not an Indian film." However, in another interview, he did praise India's Oscar-winning Resul Pookutty in the interview as well as India's Oscar-winners A. R. Rahman and Gulzar in his personal blog. Director Deepa Mehta also noted in an interview that while Slumdog Millionaire's Oscar win was, "good for the team, the film is an OK one...it's more a Western than Indian film."

Shah Rukh Khan, who was the film's producers' first choice of actor to play game show host Prem Kumar but turned down the role, defended the film, stating "I think it's really nice that it will open doors for people to understand that there is a lot of visual appeal to India. I hear a lot of people saying that India has been shown in bad light. But then my logic to everyone is that why is it that somebody comes from outside and makes a film like Gandhi and Slumdog...all we can say about it is that it is showing India in a poor light?"

Mahesh Manjrekar, who portrayed the gangster Javed in Slumdog Millionaire commented on the fact that Taare Zameen Par (released overseas by Disney as Like Stars on Earth), which was India's official submission for the 2009 Academy Award for Best Foreign Language Film nomination failed to make the short list and was frequently compared with Slumdog Millionaire in the Indian media. He stated that Slumdog Millionaire "was an amusing phenomenon! Everybody came out of the woodwork all of a sudden. It was humorous. It was like a team had won a match and the extras in the stand were dancing more than the actual Team XI. But, Slumdog... did some good things for us. It was more Hindi than any of our Hindi films. If any Indian filmmaker would’ve made it, the critics would’ve termed it a 'convenient film'. I'm sad that Aamir [Khan]'s Taare Zameen Par didn’t make it to the final round of the Oscars. I thought it to be way better than Slumdog..., without taking away anything from Boyle and the kids. But, Indian movies are underestimated there." Filmmaker Mrinal Sen also questioned whether winning the Oscar qualifies Slumdog Millionaire as a good film, stating that other great cinematic performers and filmmakers have not won the Oscar.

Director and filmmaker Priyadarshan criticized Slumdog Millionaire as a "mediocre version of those commercial films about estranged brothers and childhood sweethearts that Salim–Javed used to write so brilliantly in the 1970s." He also stated that he viewed the film at the Toronto Film Festival and that "the Westerners loved it. All the Indian[s] hated it. The West loves to see us as a wasteland, filled with horror stories of exploitation and degradation. But is that all there is to our beautiful city of Mumbai?"

Filmmaker Aadesh Shrivastava claimed that its release in the United States led to the word "slumdog" being used as a slur against Indian Americans, criticizing the positive reaction by some Indians towards what he regarded as a film that directly attacks and insults India.

== Reception from academics and scholars ==
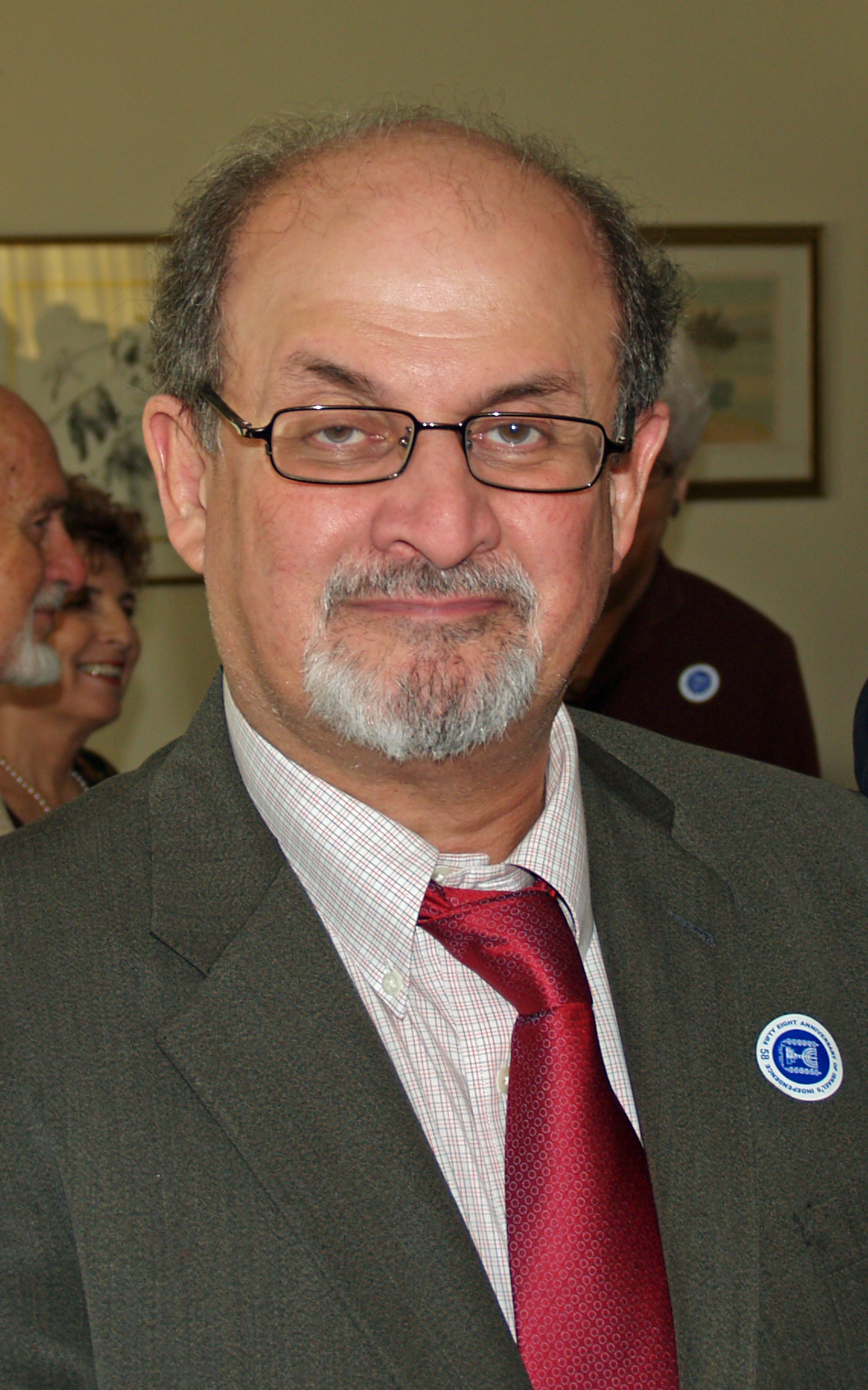
Salman Rushdie called the plot of Slumdog Millionaire a... "patently ridiculous conceit".

Author and critic Salman Rushdie has responded negatively to both the film Slumdog Millionaire and the novel on which it is based, Q & A. In his essay on film adaptations, "A Fine Pickle," Rushdie argues that the plot of Swarup's novel is "a patently ridiculous conceit, the kind of fantasy writing that gives fantasy writing a bad name. It is a plot device faithfully preserved by the film-makers, and lies at the heart of the weirdly renamed Slumdog Millionaire. As a result the film, too, beggars belief." He made similar statements about Slumdog Millionaire in a talk given at Emory University, where he was a professor, arguing that its plot "piles impossibility on impossibility," and in an earlier interview with The New York Times, where he conceded that he found the film "visually brilliant. But I have problems with the story line.... It just couldn't happen. I'm not averse to magic realism but there has to be a level of plausibility, and I felt there were three or four moments in the film where the storyline breached that rule." Rushdie also blasted Boyle's admission that he made the film in part because he was unfamiliar with India, challenging Boyle to imagine "an Indian film director making a movie about New York low-life and saying that he had done so because he knew nothing about New York and had indeed never been there. He would have been torn limb from limb by critical opinion. But for a first world director to say that about the third world is considered praiseworthy, an indication of his artistic daring. The double standards of post-colonial attitudes have not yet wholly faded away."

Some critics have suggested that the film is an imitation of "homegrown" Indian products. Radha Chadha, co-author (with Paul Husband) of The Cult of the Luxury Brand: Inside Asia's Love Affair with Luxury, argued that while Slumdog Millionaire is entertaining, it is still a "masala film," the kind of Bollywood product which Indians grow up watching. As to its popularity in the West, she further suggested that what is "ordinary" (in terms of film genre) for an Indian audience "is extraordinary for the world" and that "the mesmerizing soft power of Bollywood which has kept a billion Indians enthralled for decades is touching the rest of the world." Priya Joshi, an associate professor of English at Temple University, argued that the film's indebtedness to Bollywood cinema runs far deeper than the happy ending: "In the same way that Cinema Paradiso paid homage to the transformative power of Hollywood movies of the 1940s, Slumdog testifies to the power of Bollywood's blockbusters from the 1970s, and it's no accident that the first question on the quiz show is about the 1973 hit Zanjeer." Ananda Mitra, professor of communication at Wake Forest University, described Slumdog Millionaire as a modern-day retelling of 1970s Bollywood films, citing Nasir Hussain's Yaadon Ki Baraat (1973) in particular.

Others have echoed the critiques of Mukul Kesavan and Aamir Khan above concerning language use. For example, Smitha Radhakrishnan, assistant professor of sociology at Wellesley College, noted in UCLA's online Asia Pacific Arts journal that although the film offers "an action-packed, devastating, intriguing, and oddly beautiful world," it also contains notable "slip-ups," of which the "most glaring was the language. Despite the plausible explanation that Jamal and Salim picked up English posing as tour guides at the Taj Mahal, it's highly implausible that they would come out of that experience speaking perfect British English, as Dev Patel does in portraying the grown-up Jamal. It's also highly implausible that he would speak to Latika and Salim in English as an adult too."

Professor Vrinda Nabar, the former chair of English at the University of Mumbai, argued that the film ignores the "complexity" of Mumbai as "a city in which sensitivity coexists with despair, commitment with indifference, activism with inaction, and humanism with the inhumane." Shyamal Sengupta, a professor of film studies at the Whistling Woods International Institute for Films, Media, Animationa and Media Arts in Mumbai, criticized the film for its stereotypical portrayals of Indians by calling it a "white man's imagined India. It's not quite snake charmers, but it's close. It's a poverty tour." Matias Echanove and Rahul Srivastava noted critically in The New York Times that the film misrepresents and stereotypes the Dharavi slum in Mumbai.

Professor Mitu Sengupta, in the Department of Politics & Public Administration at Ryerson University in Toronto, criticized the way in which Mumbai's poor were depicted, stating:

"In the end, Slumdog presents a profoundly dehumanizing view of the poor, with all its troubling political implications. Since there are no internal resources, and none capable of constructive voice or action, all 'solutions' must arrive externally. After a harrowing life in an anarchic wilderness, salvation finally comes to Jamal in the form of an imported quiz-show, which he succeeds in thanks only to 'destiny.' Must other unfortunates, like the stoic Jamal, patiently await their own destinies of rescue by a foreign hand? While this self-billed 'feel good movie of the year' may help us 'feel good' that we are among the lucky ones on earth, it delivers a patronizing, colonial and ultimately sham statement on social justice for those who are not."
