= Narsinh Mehta =

Indian poet and saint (1414–1488)

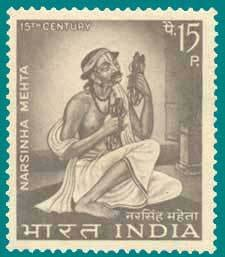
- Stamp of India - 1967
- Born: c. 1414; Talaja, Gujarat
- Died: 1488 (aged 73–74); Mangrol, Saurashtra, Gujarat Sultanate
- Occupations: Saint, poet
- Notable work: "Vaishnava Jana To"
- Movement: Bhakti movement
- Spouse: Manekbai
- Children: 2

Narsinh Mehta (1414–1488), also known as Narsinh Bhagat, was a 15th-century poet-saint of Gujarat, India, honored as the first poet, or Adi Kavi, of the Gujarati language. Narsinh became a devotee of Krishna, and dedicated his life to composing poetic works expressing his bhakti (devotional love) towards Krishna. His bhajans have remained popular in Gujarat and Rajasthan for over five centuries. Most notably, his composition "Vaishnava Jana To" was Mahatma Gandhi's favorite and became popular with freedom fighters across India.

== Biography ==
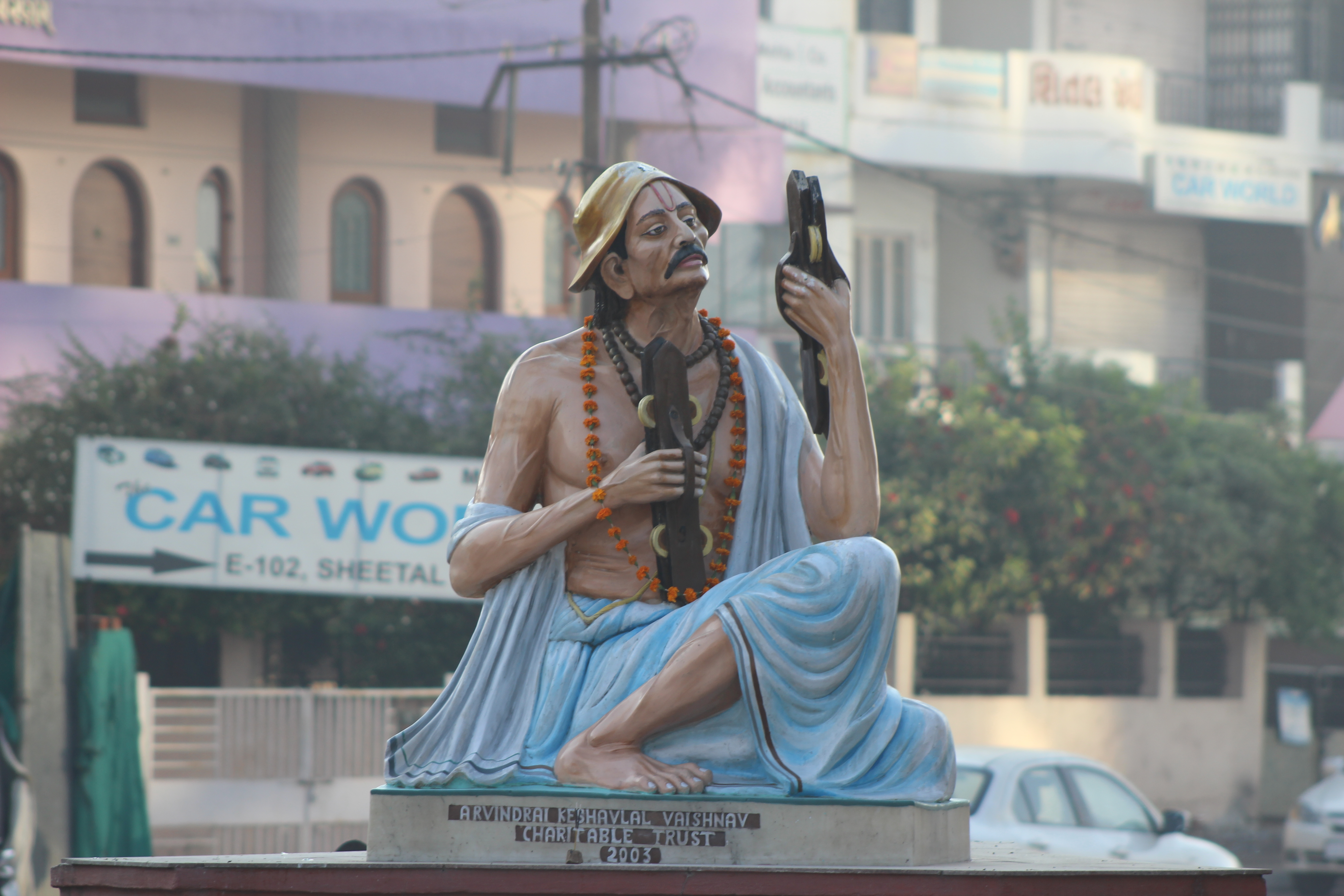
Statue of Narsinh Mehta in Vadodara

Much of what is known about Narsinh Mehta is derived from his own compositions and poetic works, due to the lack of formal historical documentation during this period. Additional insights into Narsinh Mehta's biography are found in works from other poets of subsequent eras, as their poems describe in detail the personality of Narsinh Mehta and certain key events from his life.

Though there is no consensus among scholars on exact dates, it is believed Narsinh was born in 1414 and lived until the age of 79. While there is no specific date mentioned in Narsinh's autobiographical compositions or in works from later poets, the incidents depicted establish Narsinh's presence in the 15th century, notably during the reign of Mandalika III.

=== Early life ===
Narsinh Mehta was born in the town of Talaja (now located in the Bhavnagar district, Gujarat). As a member of the Nagar Brahmin community, Narsinh's father held an administrative position in a royal court. Narsinh was mute until the age of eight. He began to speak only after meeting a holy man who had him utter the phrase "Radhe Shyam". His older brother, Bansidhar, was 17 years his senior. Narsinh's parents died when he was five years old; he was left dependent on his older brother and his sister-in-law.

Based on the language, style, and emotion of Narsinh's poetic works, it is believed he studied in his Nagar family tradition and had knowledge of literary tradition and creativity. However, his poetry focuses exclusively on religious devotion and is attributed to becoming a devotee of Krishna.

=== Becoming a devotee of Krishna ===
Narsinh and his wife Manekbai lived in his older brother Bansidhar's home, but were treated very poorly by Bansidhar's wife. An ill-tempered woman, she taunted and insulted Narsinh repeatedly. One day, when Narsinh had enough of her taunts and insults, he left the house and went to a nearby forest in search of some peace, where he fasted and meditated by a secluded Shiva lingam at Gopnath mahadev Mandir for seven days. Pleased by his devotion, the god Shiva is said to have manifested before Narsinh and took him to Vrindavan where he saw Krishna and the gopis dancing (ras leela). There, Narsinh is described to hold the torch which lit the grounds for the ras leela. He was so engrossed in watching Krishna that he did not realize the torch was burning his hand. Krishna was pleased with Narsinh's devotion and granted him a wish. Narsinh asked to have never-ending devotion to Krishna and the ability to sing about his glory. Krishna granted him this, along with the constant vision of ras leela and the promise to always be at Narsinh's side. He resolved to compose around 22,000 kirtans or compositions.

After this transformative experience, Narsinh returned to his village, touched his sister-in-law's feet as reverence, and thanked her for insulting him for had she not made him upset, the above episode would not have occurred. Thereafter Narsinh moved out of his brother's home and to a small house in Junagadh, where he began a life of devotion dedicated to Krishna.

=== Time in Junagadh ===
In Junagadh, Narsinh lived in poverty with his wife and two children, a son named Shamaldas, and a daughter for whom he had special affection, Kunwarbai. His popularity grew as a bhajan singer, as he sang and danced the praises of Krishna in the company of all, regardless of gender, class, and caste. The Nagar Brahmin community, which Narsinh belonged to, found it offensive that Narsinh associated with those deemed a lower caste. The Nagar Brahmins were considered "high ranking," and known for their elegant manners, musical skills, and court appointments. Many Nagar Brahmins at the time worshipped Shiva, and some sources state this contributed to their opposition and torment of Narsinh, who was an ardent Krishna devotee.

Narsinh's autobiographical works as well as later compositions from other poets provide a glimpse of certain key incidents from his life, depicting Narsinh's bhakti towards Krishna.

==== The wedding of Shamaldas ====
The family priest of an influential individual named Madan Mehta, came to Junagadh in search of an appropriate partner for Madan Mehta's daughter. A local Nagar Brahmin suggested the priest meet Narsinh's son Shamaldas, hoping the priest would experience Narsinh's poverty and spread this news to other towns. However, the priest approved of Shamaldas and announced the engagement. Narsinh invited Krishna to the wedding, much to the ridicule of the other Brahmins who mocked Narsinh's poverty and hopes that Krishna would help him. The wedding party of Shamaldas, full of people with meager means, departed Junagadh and arrived with much pomp and grandeur beyond everyone's expectations. It is believed that Krishna miraculously provided Narsinh's family with everything needed to celebrate the wedding of Shamaldas.

Putrah Vivah or Shamaldas no Vivah is a composition that depicts this incident and portrays Krishna coming to the aid of his devotee.

==== Promissory note ====
Many in the community questioned the poverty of Narsinh and assumed he was deceiving everyone. The local Nagar Brahmins once convinced a group of pilgrims to get a promissory note from Narsinh for ₹700, telling them that Narsinh was actually a rich man despite appearances. When approached by the pilgrims, Narsinh understood he was being tricked, but he accepted the money and wrote a promissory note to a merchant in Dwarka, where the pilgrims were traveling to.

The merchant named in the note was Shamalsha Sheth. Upon arriving in Dwarka, the pilgrims found no one had heard of an individual with this name, and assumed they had been scammed out of ₹700 by Narsinh. To their surprise, an individual named Shamalsha appeared looking for the pilgrims and paid the principal with substantial interest. It is believed the Krishna appeared as Shamalsha to fulfill the promissory note.

Narsinh's composition "Hundi", is famous not only in Gujarati but in other parts of India as well, and was written as a prayer to Krishna after he accepted this bond from the pilgrims ("Mari Hundi swikaro Maharaj re Shamala Giridhari...", which translates to "O God, please accept my note of credit..."

==== Ceremony for Kunwarbai's pregnancy ====
One noteworthy autobiographical composition is based on Narsinh's daughter, Kunwarbai, and the ceremony that occurred in honor of her pregnancy. The tradition at the time dictated that the parents of the mother-to-be would give gifts to their daughter's in-laws during the seventh month of pregnancy, a custom known as mameru. Given Narsinh's extreme poverty and his total immersion in devotion to Krishna, he arrived to his daughter's in-laws' home empty-handed. When he asked them for a list of customary gifts to provide, Kunwarbai's in-laws provided a list of expensive items that would be unattainable for Narsinh. Upon receiving the list, Narsinh prayed to Krishna, and soon a merchant, assumed to be the form of Krishna, appeared with gifts in abundance.

This episode has been captured in Narsinh's autobiographical composition - "Kunverbai nu Mameru" or "Mameru nu Pad". The legend of Krishna coming to Narsinh's aid is also preserved through compositions by later poets and films.

==== Garland from Krishna ====
The Nagar Brahmins continued to oppose Narsinh, and instigated the King of Junagadh, Ra Mandalika, to test Narsinh. The king falsely accused Narsinh, and demanded that Narsinh ask Krishna to send him the garland from the murti in the temple of Damodar. This alone would provide Narsinh's innocence and spare his life. Narsinh prayed all night and pleaded with Krishna to make the king's demand come true, so that others would not fear pursuing a path of devotion. The next morning, Krishna placed the garland on Narsinh's neck and Narsinh received an apology from the king.

=== Later life and legacy ===
Some works by later authors, such as Narsinh Mehta nu Akhyan (written in the eighteenth century) attempt to establish the clan, ancestry, and pedigree of Narsinh Mehta.

Many parallels are drawn between Narsinh's life events and those of other saint-poets such as Surdas, Tulsidas, Meera, Kabir, Namdev, and Sundarar. Like many others of the era, Narsinh faced strong opposition from society but remained steadfast in his devotion. His acceptance and association with all people, regardless of caste, creed, and social status was unique to the Nagar Brahmins at the time and remained an important part of his adherence and commitment to the Vaishnav tradition.

Narsinh's son died at a young age, leaving behind his young widow, and Narsinh's wife died of grief soon after. Despite this incident, his devotion did not change. In his later life, Narsinh went to Mangrol where, at the age of 79, he is believed to have died.

The crematorium at Mangrol is called 'Narsinh Nu Samshan', and commemorates the first poet known as Gujarati Adi Kavi.

The Narsinh Mehta Award was established in his name to recognize excellence in Gujarati literature.

Vastrapur Lake in Ahmedabad has been officially renamed in his honor.

== Poetic works ==
Narsinh's poetic work is typically viewed as bhajans towards Krishna but also Hindu bhakti. As a pioneer poet of Gujarat, his bhajans have been sung in Gujarat and Rajasthan for over five centuries. The compositions are philosophical or ethical, and often descriptive of the love of Radha and Krishna.

=== Notable features ===
Narsinh's bhajans belong to the genre "deshi" in Gujarati, which is also known as "pad" as a close similar in North Indian languages. Both styles anchor in the traditional meters and popular tunes and rhythms. He is known for ragas common during the morning time, spring, and rainy season.

According to Champaklal Nayak, Narsinh is the first to compose bhajans about Krishna in the appropriate ragas. Narsinh composed items for his own singing, and it is impossible to confirm or reconstruct the melodies in which he sang them.

One of the most important features of Narsinh's works is that they are not available in the language in which Narsinh had composed them. They have been largely preserved orally. The oldest available manuscript of his work is dated around 1612, and was found by the noted scholar Keshavram Kashiram Shastri from Gujarat Vidhya Sabha. Because of the immense popularity of his works, their language has undergone modifications over time.

Narsinh's work has expanded beyond his Hindu bhakti into secular contexts such as school events and cultural programs.

=== Genres of Gujarati folk music ===
Narsinh's bhajans are frequently performed in the popular Gujarati genres of garbi, dhol, and prabhatiya. Garbi and dhol are celebratory genres, whereas the prabhatiya genre is sung in the morning to evoke peacefulness and contentment.

=== Categories of compositions ===
Narsinh's works are typically organized into four broad categories that contain substantial overlap:

1. Autobiographical compositions: Putra Vivah/Shamaldas no Vivah, Mameru/Kunvarbai nu Mameru, Hundi, Har Mala, Jhari Na Pada, and compositions depicting acceptance of Harijans
2. Miscellaneous narratives: Chaturis, Sudama Charit, Dana Leela, and episodes based on Srimad Bhagwatam
3. Songs of Sringar: love poems depicting Radha and Krishna
4. Songs of devotion, philosophical poems, and didactic works

=== Works used by Mahatma Gandhi ===
Mahatma Gandhi referenced Narsinh's work considerably in his speeches, writings, and public prayers. Gandhi's repeated reference to the bhajan Vaishnava Jana To shaped it as a global song of compassion, moral integrity, and duty to humankind. Gandhi elevated Narsinh's life and work beyond the religious context and into greater ethical and moral themes.

== In popular culture ==
The first Gujarati talkie film, Narsinh Mehta (1932), directed by Nanubhai Vakil, was based on Narsinh Mehta's life. The bilingual film Narsi Mehta in Hindi and Narsi Bhagat in Gujarati (1940), directed by Vijay Bhatt, paralleled Mehta with Mahatma Gandhi. Narsi Bhagat, an Indian Hindi-language biographical film by Devendra Goel, released in 1957. The soundtrack from the film, with music by Ravi Shankar Sharma and lyrics by Gopal Singh Nepali, became popular, especially the song "Darshan Do Ghanshyam" (which was misattributed to the poet Surdas in the 2008 film Slumdog Millionaire). This was followed by Bhagat Narsinh Mehta, an Indian Gujarati-language film directed by Vijay B. Chauhan, which released in 1984.

Narsaiyo (1991) was a Gujarati television series telecast by the Ahmedabad centre of Doordarshan, starring Darshan Jariwala in the lead role. This 27-episode successful series was produced by Nandubhai Shah and directed by Mulraj Rajda.

== Sanskrit sources and Narasinha's songs ==
Narasinha Mehta's devotional songs blend elements from Sanskrit scriptural traditions with the cultural expressions of Gujarat. His work draws upon two primary Sanskrit sources: the Bhagavata Purana and Jayadeva's Gitagovinda. Several episodes of Krishna's life in his repertoire such as the theft of butter, the complaints of the gopis, and the subduing of the serpent Kaliya are adapted from the narrative framework of the Bhagavata. His lyrics also reflect the metaphysical vision of the Bhagavata, particularly its monistic interpretation of Krishna's lila as a manifestation of the all-pervasive Ultimate Reality. Narasinha further incorporates the influence of the Gitagovinda by quoting its Sanskrit verses directly in his Gujarati songs to describe the mutual love between Radha and Krishna. At the same time, his work is distinguished by its use of colloquial Gujarati, local folk rhythms known as deshis, and depictions of a "Gujaratized" Braj where Krishna is portrayed enjoying regional foods such as karamalo. His prabhatiya (morning hymns) have become a lasting part of the religious traditions of Gujarat.
