= Narsi Bhagat =

- Directed by: Vijay Bhatt
- Written by: Vishnupant Aundhkar (screenplay)
- Music by: Shankar Rao Vyas
- Production company: Prakash Pictures
- Release date: 1940
- Running time: 135 minutes
- Country: British India
- Languages: Hindi, Gujarati

Narsi Bhagat is a Bollywood devotional biopic film directed by Vijay Bhatt, released in 1940. The film, based on Gujarat's famous saint-poet Narsinh Mehta, contains his most popular bhajan, "Vaishno Jan To Tene Kahiye Je Peed Parayi Jane Re", which was also the favourite of Mahatma Gandhi.

== Cast ==
- Vishnupant Pagnis as Narasinh Mehta
- Durga Khote as Manekbai
- Pande as Sarangadhar
- V. Adikhar
- Vimala Vasishta
- Amirbai Karnataki
- Ram Marathe
- Baby Indira
