= Masala film =

Indian film genre

Masala films of Indian cinema are those that blend multiple genres into one work. Masala films emerged in the 1970s and are still being created as of the 2020s. Typically these films freely blend action, comedy, romance, and drama, or melodrama. They also tend to be musicals, often including songs filmed in picturesque locations.

The genre is named after the masala, a mixture of spices in Indian cuisine. According to The Hindu, masala is the most popular genre of Indian cinema. Masala films have origins in the 1970s and are common in every major film industry in India. Production of these films is still active in the mid-2020s.

== Characteristics ==
Although a masala film has no single genre or plot trope defining it, there are recurring characteristics of film production, choreography, set design, and visuals. This can be attributed to India's majority-Hindu population's cultural affinity with the Nāṭya Shāstra, an ancient Hindu religious text on the performing arts.

In Tejaswini Ganti's book Bollywood: A Guidebook to Popular Hindi Cinema, Indian films are described as having roots in Indian aesthetics (e.g., Nāṭya Shāstra), which employ the philosophical concepts of rasa ('flavor') and bhava ('to become') to explain the mechanisms of emotion. Rasa has nine flavours: love, humour, wonder, courage, calmness, anger, sadness, fear, and disgust. In writing, a lack of rasa combined with a lack of bhava would yield a 'tasteless' result. Two primary bhavas are sthayi ('permanent') and vyabichari ('transitory'). Writes Ganti: "A central premise of the masala genre is that viewers derive pleasure by being taken through a series of moods or emotional states: being angry or disgusted with the villains; being moved (often to tears) by some sort of loss, usually death; laughing at a clownish character; being amazed or seduced by elaborate song sequences; and being happy for the couple and their eventual union". In contrast, emotional tension in Western film is generated with plots, in line with Aristotle's characterization stories as akin to the soul of a tragedy in his Poetics.

To make a compelling story, there is this idea in Aristotle's Poetics: catharsis or emotional release. Emotional release from the audience watching a play or act, and expressing their most profound feeling. Emotional release tends to happen at the climax of the story. When watching Masala films, it is like riding a rollercoaster. Every feeling on the spectrum of emotion, like anger or happiness, is portrayed in a Masala film. The second characteristic is the theme. Even though Masala does not have an exact plot or genre, specific themes pop up in the film, like myth, legends, or family. These themes exist because "Masala films are firmly rooted in Hindu epics such as the Mahabharata and the Ramayana. Their narratives easily play out over several centuries or even millennia, featuring the family lives of dynasties both divine and mortal". That is why, in Masala, family plays an integral part in the plot. Also, because of the use of epics, there is this marvelous feeling of fiction in the film that the audience does not experience in real life. The third characteristic of Masala films is that they "are typically longer than Western films, with runtimes of two to three hours or more". The reason is also the same as the theme of family. Due to its being inspired by epics and the Indian Aesthetics theory, the scale of the story must be significant. It represents the lavish sets and the time they occupied in the audience's eye.

== History ==
According to several critics and scholars, the masala film was pioneered in the 1970s by filmmakers Nasir Hussain and Manmohan Desai, and screenwriters Salim–Javed. Yaadon Ki Baaraat (1973), directed by Nasir Hussain and written by Salim–Javed, has been identified by many as the first masala film. However, critic S. Shankar has claimed Tamil cinema had earlier masala dosa films, citing Parasakthi (1952) as the earliest example, but distinguishes them from modern masala films. After Yaadon Ki Baaraat, Salim–Javed went on to write more successful masala films in the 1970s and 1980s. A landmark for the masala film genre was Amar Akbar Anthony (1977), directed by Manmohan Desai and written by Kader Khan. Manmohan Desai successfully became the most prolific filmmaker of the genre in the 1970s and 1980s.

Sholay (1975), directed by Ramesh Sippy and written by Salim-Javed, also falls under the masala genre. It is sometimes called a "Curry Western", a play on the term "Spaghetti Western". A more accurate genre label is the "Dacoit Western", as it combined the conventions of Indian dacoit films such as Mother India (1957) and Gunga Jumna (1961) with that of Spaghetti Westerns. Sholay spawned a subgenre of "Dacoit Western" films in the 1970s.

Masala films helped establish many leading actors as superstars in the 1970s and 1980s, such as Dharmendra, Jeetendra, Amitabh Bachchan, Rishi Kapoor, Shatrughan Sinha and Sridevi achieved stardom in their early Bollywood careers with masala movies. Since the 1990s, actors such as Sunny Deol (Dharmendra's son), Aamir Khan (Nasir Hussain's nephew), Sanjay Dutt, Anil Kapoor, Jackie Shroff, Govinda, Shah Rukh Khan, Salman Khan (Salim Khan's son), Akshay Kumar and Ajay Devgn in Bollywood; Uttam Kumar, Ranjit Mallick, Mithun Chakraborty, Prosenjit Chatterjee, Jeet, Dev, Jisshu Sengupta, Tota Roy Chowdhury and Ankush Hazra in Bengali cinema; M. G. Ramachandran, Rajinikanth, Kamal Haasan, Vijayakanth, Ajith Kumar, Vijay, Suriya, Vikram, Dhanush, Raghava Lawrance, Sivakarthikeyan, in Kollywood; N. T. Rama Rao, Krishna, Chiranjeevi, Mahesh Babu, Allu Arjun, Jr. NTR, Nandamuri Balakrishna, Prabhas, Nagarjuna, Ram Charan and Pawan Kalyan in Tollywood; Madhu, Prem Nazir, Mammootty, Mohanlal, Jayan and Prithviraj Sukumaran in Mollywood; Dr. Rajkumar, Vishnuvardhan, Ambareesh, Darshan, Puneeth Rajkumar, Sudeep and Yash in Kannada cinema have all experienced success in this format.

This style is used often in Hindi (Bollywood), Bengali (Tollywood) and South Indian films, as it helps make them appeal to a broad variety of viewers. Famous masala filmmakers include David Dhawan, Rohit Shetty, Anees Bazmee and Farah Khan in Bollywood; Shaji Kailas and Joshiy in Mollywood; Shakti Samanta, Pijush Basu, Prabhat Roy, Raj Chakraborty, Srijit Mukherji, Ravi Kinnagi, Anjan Chowdhury, Swapan Saha, Haranath Chakraborty, Raja Chanda, Sujit Mondal, Rajiv Kumar Biswas, Pathikrit Basu and Abhirup Ghosh in Bengali cinema; K. Raghavendra Rao, S. S. Rajamouli, Puri Jagannadh, Trivikram Srinivas, Boyapati Srinu and Srinu Vaitla in Telugu cinema; S. Shankar, Hari, Siruthai Siva, Pandiraj, AR Murugadoss, K. V. Anand, N. Lingusamy and K. S. Ravikumar in Tamil cinema; and in Kannada cinema it was V. Somashekhar and K. S. R. Das in the 1970s; A. T. Raghu and Joe Simon in the 1980s; K. V. Raju, Om Prakash Rao and Shivamani in the 1990s; and Prem, K. Madesh and A. Harsha in the 2000s.

Beyond Indian cinema, Danny Boyle's Academy Award–winning film Slumdog Millionaire (2008), based on Vikas Swarup's Boeke Prize winning novel Q & A (2005), has been described by several reviewers as a "masala" movie, due to the way the film combines "familiar raw ingredients into a feverish masala" and culminates in "the romantic leads finding each other." This is due to the influence of the Bollywood masala genre on the film. According to Loveleen Tandan, Slumdog Millionaire screenwriter Simon Beaufoy "studied Salim-Javed's kind of cinema minutely." The influence of Bollywood masala films can also be seen in Western musical films. Baz Luhrmann stated that his successful musical film Moulin Rouge! (2001) was directly inspired by Bollywood musicals.

Aamir Khan, who debuted as a child actor in the first masala film Yaadon Ki Baraat, has been credited for redefining and modernising the masala film with his own distinct brand of socially conscious cinema in the early 21st century. His films blur the distinction between commercial masala films and realistic parallel cinema, combining the entertainment and production values of the former with the believable narratives and strong messages of the latter, earning both commercial success and critical acclaim, in India and overseas.

== Influences ==
While the masala film genre originated from Bollywood films in the 1970s, there have been several earlier influences that have shaped its conventions. The first was the ancient Indian epics of Mahabharata and Ramayana which have exerted a profound influence on the thought and imagination of Indian popular cinema, particularly in its narratives. Examples of this influence include the techniques of a side story, back-story and story within a story. Indian popular films often have plots that branch off into sub-plots; such narrative dispersals can clearly be seen in the 1993 films Khalnayak and Gardish. The second influence was the impact of ancient Sanskrit drama, with its highly stylized nature and emphasis on spectacle, where music, dance and gesture combined "to create a vibrant artistic unit with dance and mime being central to the dramatic experience." Sanskrit dramas were known as natya, derived from the root word nrit (dance), characterizing them as spectacular dance-dramas which has continued in Indian cinema. The third influence was the traditional folk theatre of India, which became popular from around the 10th century with the decline of Sanskrit theatre. These regional traditions include the Jatra of Bengal, the Ramlila of Uttar Pradesh, and the Terukkuttu of Tamil Nadu. The fourth influence was Parsi theatre, which "blended realism and fantasy, music and dance, narrative and spectacle, earthy dialogue and ingenuity of stage presentation, integrating them into a dramatic discourse of melodrama. The Parsi plays contained crude humour, melodious songs and music, sensationalism and dazzling stagecraft."

A major foreign influence was Hollywood, where musicals were popular from the 1920s to the 1950s, though Indian filmmakers departed from their Hollywood counterparts in several ways. "For example, the Hollywood musicals had as their plot the world of entertainment itself. Indian filmmakers, while enhancing the elements of fantasy so pervasive in Indian popular films, used song and music as a natural mode of articulation in a given situation in their films. There is a strong Indian tradition of narrating mythology, history, fairy stories and so on through song and dance." In addition, "whereas Hollywood filmmakers strove to conceal the constructed nature of their work so that the realistic narrative was wholly dominant, Indian filmmakers did not attempt to conceal the fact that what was shown on the screen was a creation, an illusion, a fiction. However, they demonstrated how this creation intersected with people's day-to-day lives in complex and interesting ways." During the 1970s, commercial Bollywood films drew from several foreign influences, including New Hollywood, Hong Kong martial arts cinema, and Italian exploitation films.

== Dacoit Western ==
The Bollywood film Sholay (1975) was often referred to as a "curry Western". A more accurate genre label for the film is the "dacoit Western", as it combines the conventions of Indian dacoit films such as Mother India (1957) and Gunga Jumna (1961) with those of spaghetti Westerns. Sholay spawned its own genre of "dacoit Western" films in Bollywood during the 1970s.

One of the significant influences of Indian cinema is Western film. Since the release of The Great Train Robbery (1903), the first Western movie ever created, Western has become the genre that defines American cinema. Due to its nature and characteristics, it appeals to the US and the international audience. Westerns are spreading in Bollywood films, specifically in the Masala film genre. The first masala movie, Yaadon Ki Baaraat (1973), is an inspired Western movie. The film associated the most with the masala genre, Sholay, also has roots in Western ideology. These films are known as curry Western or masala Western - "a cycle of Indian films that began in the early 1970s which borrowed and recombined tropes from American Westerns, Italian Westerns, Japanese Sword films, and the South Asian 'dacoit' (bandit) films, among other influences". However, these films have been criticized as cheap copies of Westerns. One of the two writers who wrote Sholay (1975), Javed Akhtar, addresses these allegations in his book, Talking Life: Javed Akhtar in Conversation with Nasreen Munni Kabir, by stating, "Some people said the influence of Sergio Leone was very strong. Yes, that was true. We loved his films, and he did influence us, but other films impacted us too".

After the rise of the curry western, the masala genre moved away from Western tropes. However, it does not stop masala films from borrowing ideas from Hollywood. This idea can be seen during the 80s and 90s in Bollywood movies like Akele Hum Akele Tum (1995), Kuch Kuch Hota Hai (1998), Koi... Mil Gaya (2003), Darr (1993), and Chalte Chalte (2003). All these movies have in common that it is a remake of Hollywood classics. The thing about these films that Hollywood inspires is that they are not parodying or blatantly copied; they borrow those details to craft their own story. This idea is known as glocalization. Rashna Wadia Richards, an associate professor and Chair of Film and Media Studies at Rhodes College, coins this term in her paper "(Not) Kramer vs. Kumar: The Contemporary Bollywood Remake as Glocal Masala Film," where she discusses the idea that masala films "borrow from, and transform a range of texts, neither fully rejecting 'local' Hindi cinematic traditions nor wholly imitating dominant 'global' Hollywood conventions." The reason for masala film being glocalized is that the world is becoming more globalized and that everyone has the opportunity to watch movies that do not originate from their own area. Watching with similar themes or devices will help people to watch those movies, hence the borrowing element of Hollywood movies because Hollywood movies are the standard of world cinema.

== See also ==
- Parallel cinema
