= Azharuddin Mohammed Ismail =

Indian former child actor

Azharuddin Ismail
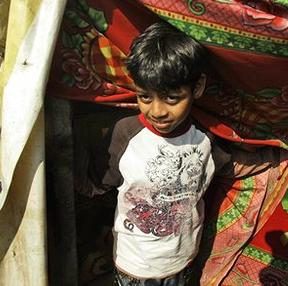
- Azharuddin in front of his hut in Mumbai
- Born: Azharuddin Mohammed Ismail; November 17, 1998 (age 27); Mumbai, India
- Years active: 2008–2009
- Notable work: Slumdog Millionaire
- Awards: Screen Actors Guild Award for Outstanding Performance by a Cast in a Motion Picture

Azharuddin Mohammed "Azhar" Ismail (born 1998) is an Indian former child actor, who played the youngest version of Salim Malik in the Oscar-winning film Slumdog Millionaire (2008), for which he won a Screen Actors Guild Award. Following the film's success, he was cast in the Bollywood film Kal Kisne Dekha (2009).

== Biography ==
Like his on-screen character, Azaruddin came from one of the slums of Mumbai, living in the Garib Nagar slum near Bandra station. According to The Daily Telegraph, "his family's illegal hut was demolished by the local authorities and he now sleeps under a sheet of plastic tarpaulin". In 2020 the Mumbai Mirror published an article about Azharuddin which revealed he was living in the slums again after his business went bankrupt. His mother also revealed he became a drug addict.

=== Career ===
Critics have claimed Azharuddin and his co-star Rubina Ali, had been underpaid for their part in the film, something disputed by the film's producer saying the actors had been paid the equivalent of a monthly salary payment for the production company's senior staff in Britain. A trust fund has been set up for the children which will be released to them when they turn eighteen, provided they continue in education until this time.

Both Azharuddin and Rubina attended the 81st Academy Awards on 22 February 2009, along with all of the other actors that played Salim, Jamal and Latika. Azharuddin was accompanied by his mother Shameem Ismail, while Rubina was accompanied by her uncle. This was his first journey outside of Mumbai.

Following the success of Slumdog Millionaire at the 2009 Academy Awards the Maharashtra Housing Area Development Authority have recommended the children be rehoused, with an official saying the children had "brought laurels to the country" and deserved to be rewarded. On 25 February 2009, the Maharashtra Housing and Development Authority announced that Azharuddin as well as Rubina would be given "free houses" so that they would no longer have to live in the Mumbai slum of Garib Nagar.

In March 2009, Azharuddun was part of the cast in the Bollywood film Kal Kisne Dekha (2009), alongside his Slumdog Millionaire co-star Rubina Ali. The film was directed by Vivek Sharma and features the Bollywood stars Shah Rukh Khan, Rishi Kapoor and Juhi Chawla in cameo roles.

== Controversies ==
According to the UK newspaper, The Daily Telegraph, Azharuddin Ismail was paid £1,700 during filming for a month's work on the film. A Fox Searchlight spokesman responded that for their one-month work on the film, he was paid three times the amount of an average annual salary for an adult living in their neighborhood.

On 26 January 2009, Danny Boyle (director) and Christian Colson (producer) released a written statement saying that they had "paid painstaking and considered attention to how Azhar and Rubina's involvement in the film could be of lasting benefit to them over and above the payment they received for their work". Boyle and Colson have stated that they have "set up trust funds for Rubina and Azharuddin and paid for their education," although the exact amount of the trust funds is not known. This has also been met with criticism as there is question as to how children growing up in the slums have any expectation of being able to attend higher education, making the trust fund potentially useless.

Boyle has explained that, "We don't want to reveal exact figures about what's in the trust fund, what's in the bank account for them for when they leave school because it will make them vulnerable and a target really but it is substantial, and they will hopefully gain benefit from the film long after the film has disappeared and long after the media who are chasing them at the moment sadly have lost interest in the film and that's been our approach throughout and I think it's the right approach."

According to The Economic Times, Azharuddin will have £17,500 put into a trust fund which he will get, plus interest, when he is 18. His father has been quoted as saying "My son has taken on the world and won. I am so proud of him but I want more money. They promised me a new house but it hasn't happened. I'm still in the slum. I want the money now, it is of no use later. Mr Boyle should take care of my son."

Following his return home from the Oscars, there was more controversy surrounding Azharuddin after his father, Ismail Mohammed, reportedly slapped him for refusing to be interviewed by a foreign journalist because he was tired. According to their neighbour, Yakub Abdul Sheikh, when "Azharuddin refused to oblige, he slapped him, but later was full of remorse".

=== Slum home demolished ===
In May 2009, it was reported that local authorities had demolished his family's makeshift shelter, and that police had forced him out of it after hitting him with a bamboo stick. Authorities stated that "he and other families were squatting on land that was owned by the government". After the demolition, he described himself and his family as "homeless, we have nowhere to go". However, Azharuddin and his family moved into a new home in the Santa Cruz area of Mumbai, purchased by a trust set up by the film's producers.

In January 2020, as he lost his fame and wealth due to the trust not paying him any more money, Azharuddin had to sell his flat and move to a room in Naupada area in Bandra East, near the slums where he grew up in. He also previously tried to start his own business, but it failed, so he sold his flat.

== Awards and honours ==
Won

- 2009: Screen Actors Guild Award for Outstanding Performance by a Cast in a Motion Picture for Slumdog Millionaire

Nominated

- 2008: Black Reel Awards of 2008 - Best Ensemble for Slumdog Millionaire

== Filmography ==
Year	Film	Role	Language	Notes
2008	Slumdog Millionaire	Younger Salim	English and Hindi	Slumdog Crorepati in Hindi and Naanum Kodeswaran in Tamil
2009	Kal Kisne Dekha		Hindi	Cameo
