= Ashutosh Lobo Gajiwala =

Indian film actor and entrepreneur (born 1993)

- Born: 17 May 1993 (age 33); Bombay, India
- Occupations: Actor, entrepreneur
- Years active: 2008–present
- Known for: Slumdog Millionaire

Ashutosh Lobo Gajiwala (Hindi: आशुतोष लोबो गज्जीवाला) (born 17 May 1993) is an Indian actor and entrepreneur. Gajiwala is best known for his 2008 role as the young Salim Malik in the film Slumdog Millionaire. He received the Screen Actors Guild Award for Outstanding Performance by a Cast in a Motion Picture for the film.

Gajiwala is based in Mumbai and resides with his family in Mumbai's Mahalaxmi area. His father, Dr Kalpesh Gajiwala, is a plastic surgeon, and his mother Dr Astrid Lobo is a doctor, scientist and theologian. He has two older sisters, Gayatri and Nivedita. Gajiwala attended the Campion School in Colaba. As a child, he was known for being an active theatre actor and singer. He later attended St. Xavier's College, Mumbai, and graduated with a bachelor's degree in Mass Media which was followed later a Master's in Public Policy in which he graduated with Distinction. His Master's thesis was titled "Tissue Banking in India: Need, Regulatory Hurdles and Way Forward".

Even in his early days, Gajiwala evinced a keen interest in entrepreneurial ventures and the start-up ecosystem. The work of Dr. Verghese Kurien and the Amul Model served as an inspiration to explore the aggregator-effect in civil movements and the use of technology in mass empowerment.

As a founding Partner, he set up ALG BioTech LLP, India's first tissue banking consultancy in the field of biotechnology, built around the pioneering work of his mother, Dr Astrid, and prior to that was one of the first team members of Novo Tissue Bank & Research Center, India's first standalone full service private tissue bank in Mumbai. Having worked in start ups and enterprises, in 2025 Ashutosh attended SPJIMR, one of India's top B-schools, to pursue his full time MBA.

== Filmography ==
- 2008: Slumdog Millionaire
