= Rubina Ali =

Indian actress

Rubina Ali Qureshi
- Born: Rubina Ali; 1999 or 2000 (age 26–27)
- Other names: Rubina Qureshi, Rubina Jodiyawala
- Occupation: Actress
- Years active: 2008–2013

Rubina Ali, also known as Rubina Qureshi and as Rubina Jodiyawala, is an Indian actress who played the child version of Latika in the Oscar-winning film Slumdog Millionaire (2008), for which she won a Screen Actors Guild Award. Following the film's success, she was cast in the Bollywood film Kal Kisne Dekha (2009).

== Early and personal life ==
Like her on-screen character, Rubina came from one of the slums of Mumbai, living in the Garib Nagar slum near Bandra station. She lives with her father Rafiq, her sister Sana, her brother Abbas and her stepmother Munni. Rubina's biological mother, Khurshid (alias Khushi), after divorcing Rafiq, married Monish. Her father married Munni and Rubina was raised by her father and stepmother. Munni has four children from her past marriage – Suraiya, Sanjida, Babu and Irfan.

Following the success of Slumdog Millionaire at the 2009 Academy Awards, the Maharashtra Housing Area Development Authority recommended the children be rehoused, with an official saying the children had "brought laurels to the country" and deserved to be rewarded. On 25 February 2009, the Maharashtra Housing and Development Authority announced that Azharuddin as well as Rubina would be given "free houses" so that they would no longer have to live in the Mumbai slum of Garib Nagar. However Ali remained in a shanty in Garib Nagar until it burned down in March 2011. After taking temporary refuge in rental, Rubina and her family were eventually rehoused in her own flat in the Bandra West suburb of Mumbai, bought for her by the Jai Ho Trust set up by British director Danny Boyle.

She was married in November 2023.

== Career ==
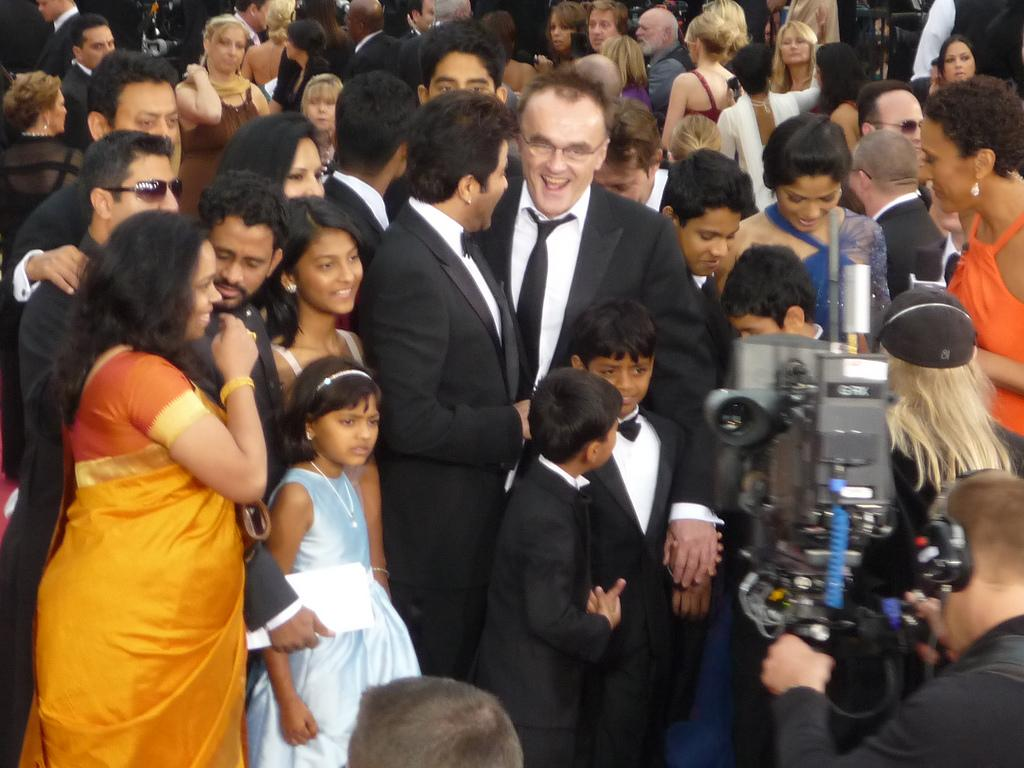
Slumdog Millionaire team at the 81st Academy Awards in the US

Critics have claimed Rubina and her co-star Azharuddin Mohammed Ismail had been underpaid for their part in the film. This has been disputed by the film's producer, who says the actors had been paid the equivalent of a monthly salary payment for the production company's senior staff in Britain. A trust fund has been set up for the children which will be released to them when they turn eighteen, provided they continue in education until this time.

Both Azharuddin and Rubina attended the 81st Academy Awards on 22 February 2009, along with all of the other actors who played Salim, Jamal and Latika. Azharuddin was accompanied by his mother Shameem Ismail, while Rubina was accompanied by her uncle. This was her first journey outside of Mumbai.

In March 2009, Rubina was cast in the Bollywood film Kal Kisne Dekha (2009), alongside her Slumdog Millionaire co-star Azharuddin Mohammed Ismail. The film was directed by Vivek Sharma and featured the Bollywood stars Shah Rukh Khan, Rishi Kapoor and Juhi Chawla in cameo roles.

In July 2009, 9-year-old Rubina wrote an autobiography called Slumgirl Dreaming detailing her life so far and her experience filming Slumdog Millionaire, making her the youngest person to pen a memoir.

In 2009 Ali announced that she would be starring in the romantic comedy Lord Owen's Lady alongside Anthony Hopkins, but as of 2013 the film has not commenced filming.

As of 2020, she was studying fashion design at a university and was working a part-time job at a makeup studio.

In 2022, she opened her own beauty salon near Mumbai. She is pursuing a career as a hair and makeup artist. In an interview with The Times of India, she said would be open to possibly acting again.

=== Compensation ===
According to the British newspaper, The Daily Telegraph, Rubina Ali was paid £500 during filming for a month's work on the film. A Fox Searchlight spokesman responded that for their one-month work on the film, she was paid three times the amount of an average annual salary for an adult living in their neighborhood.

On 26 January 2009, Danny Boyle (director) and Christian Colson (producer) released a written statement saying that they had “paid painstaking and considered attention to how Azhar and Rubina’s involvement in the film could be of lasting benefit to them over and above the payment they received for their work”. Boyle and Colson have stated that they have "set up trust funds for Rubina and Azharuddin and paid for their education," although the exact amount of the trust funds is not known. This has also been met with criticism as there is question as to how children growing up in the slums have any expectation of being able to attend higher education, making the trust fund potentially useless.

Boyle has explained that, "We don't want to reveal exact figures about what's in the trust fund, what's in the bank account for them for when they leave school because it will make them vulnerable and a target really but it is substantial, and they will hopefully gain benefit from the film long after the film has disappeared and long after the media who are chasing them at the moment sadly have lost interest in the film and that's been our approach throughout and I think it's the right approach."

== Awards and honours ==
Won

- 2009: Screen Actors Guild Award for Outstanding Performance by a Cast in a Motion Picture for Slumdog Millionaire

Nominated

- 2008: Black Reel Awards of 2008 – Best Ensemble for Slumdog Millionaire

== Filmography ==
Year	Film	Role	Language	Notes
2008	Slumdog Millionaire	Younger Latika	English and Hindi	
2009	Bollywood Hero	Begging girl	Dutch and Hindi	
2009	Kal Kisne Dekha		Hindi	
2013	La Alfombra Roja	herself	Hindi and English	The Red Carpet in English; documentary short
