= Loveleen Tandan =

Indian film and casting director

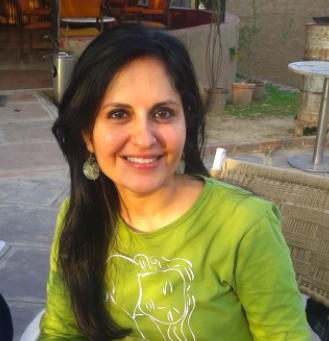
- Born: New Delhi, India
- Education: Hindu College, University of Delhi A.J.K. Mass Communication Research Centre, Jamia Millia Islamia
- Known for: Slumdog Millionaire

Loveleen Tandan is an Indian film and casting director. She is the co-director (India) of Slumdog Millionaire along with Danny Boyle. She has also been the casting director for several other films, including Monsoon Wedding (2001) and Brick Lane (2007). She has been a casting consultant for The Namesake (2007).

Loveleen has featured in the "Annual Women's Big Impact Report", an initiative of Hollywood's Variety magazine, which profiles women that have made pathbreaking contributions in world entertainment.

== Early life and background ==
Loveleen Tandan was born and raised in New Delhi, India. She did her schooling from Mater Dei School. Loveleen studied Sociology Honors at the Hindu College, University of Delhi. She was active in college politics and was nominated as the Finance Minister of the college. She pursued a master's degree with top honors in Mass Communication from MCRC, Jamia Millia Islamia University.

== Career ==
Loveleen Tandan has worked with Deepa Mehta on Earth (1998), and later worked with Mira Nair on three films: Monsoon Wedding (2001), Vanity Fair (2004) and The Namesake (2006). She was also the casting director (alongside Shaheen Baig) for Brick Lane (2007), directed by Sarah Gavron and adapted from Monica Ali's novel of the same name.

Tandan's most major credit is Slumdog Millionaire (2008), where she initially began as one of the film's casting directors (with Gail Stevens co-ordinating casting from London) but was, during production on the film, designated as the "Co-Director: India" by Danny Boyle in recognition of her significant contributions in the making of the film. Boyle explained his reasoning behind the credit by stating it was "because I had her there every day, and I kind of relied on her enormously to make sure I didn't make any big mistakes, and obviously, translation for the kids. And translation of the text because obviously, if you translate a line of Simon's literally into Hindi, a seven-year-old is just going to go… So, they had to be given a line that was the equivalent in Hindi." Tandan herself has stated that she was given the co-director credit after she "suggested to Danny and Simon Beaufoy, the writer of Slumdog, that it was important to do some of it in Hindi to bring the film alive (20% of the film is in Hindi). They asked me to come up with Hindi dialogues which I, of course, instantly agreed to do. And as we drew closer to the shoot date, Danny asked me to step in as the co-director."

The film won eight Academy Awards, five Critics' Choice Awards, four Golden Globes and seven BAFTA Awards. Tandan's work as co-director of the film was recognised by the New York Film Critics Online Awards (NYFCCO Awards), which awarded "Best Director" to "Danny Boyle with Loveleen Tandan".

== Filmography ==
=== Director ===
- Slumdog Millionaire (2008) – Co-director (India)

=== Casting director ===
- Slumdog Millionaire (2008)
- Tandoori Love (2008)
- Brick Lane (2007)
- Migration (2007)
- Vanity Fair (2004)
- Monsoon Wedding (2001)

=== Casting consultant ===
- The Namesake (2006)

=== A.D. department ===
- Earth (Indian title: 1947) (1998) – production assistant
