= Slumdog Millionaire =

2008 British film by Danny Boyle

- Theatrical release poster
- Directed by: Danny Boyle
- Screenplay by: Simon Beaufoy
- Based on: Q & A by Vikas Swarup
- Produced by: Christian Colson
- Starring: Dev Patel; Freida Pinto; Madhur Mittal; Anil Kapoor; Irrfan Khan
- Cinematography: Anthony Dod Mantle
- Edited by: Chris Dickens
- Music by: A. R. Rahman
- Production companies: Celador Films; Film4
- Distributed by: Pathé Distribution^{[iii]}
- Release dates: 30 August 2008 (Telluride); 9 January 2009 (United Kingdom)
- Running time: 120 minutes
- Country: United Kingdom
- Language: English
- Budget: $15 million
- Box office: $378 million

Slumdog Millionaire is a 2008 British drama film directed by Danny Boyle, written by Simon Beaufoy, and produced by Christian Colson, with Loveleen Tandan credited as co-director. It was loosely based on the novel Q & A (2005) by Indian author Vikas Swarup. Starring Dev Patel in his film debut, it narrates the story of 18-year-old Muslim boy Jamal Malik from the Juhu slums of Mumbai.

As a contestant on Kaun Banega Crorepati, a Hindi-language Indian version of Who Wants to Be a Millionaire?, Jamal surprises everyone by answering every question correctly so far, winning ₹1 crore (US$210,000, equivalent to around $330,000 in 2026), and he is one question away from winning the grand prize of ₹2 crore (US$420,000, equivalent to around $660,000 in 2026). Accused of cheating, he recounts his life story to the police, illustrating how he was able to answer each question.

After its world premiere at the Telluride Film Festival and later screenings at the Toronto International Film Festival and the London Film Festival, Slumdog Millionaire had a nationwide release in United Kingdom on 9 January 2009, in India on 23 January 2009, and in the United States on 25 January 2009. A sleeper hit, Slumdog Millionaire was widely acclaimed, praised for its plot, soundtrack, cinematography, editing, direction, and performances. It was nominated for 10 Academy Awards in 2009 and won 8—the most of any 2008 film—including Best Picture, Best Director, and Best Adapted Screenplay. It won seven BAFTA Awards including Best Film, five Critics' Choice Awards and four Golden Globes. However, reception in India and among Indian diaspora was mixed, and the film was the subject of controversy over its depiction of poverty in India and other issues. The Hindustan Times called it "an assault on Indian self-esteem".

== Plot ==
In 1992, five-year-old Muslim boy Jamal Malik, a resident of the Juhu slum in Mumbai, obtains Bollywood star Amitabh Bachchan's autograph after jumping into a cesspit; the crowds around Amitabh Bachchan are deterred by Jamal as he is covered head to toe in human feces. Jamal's elder brother Salim later sells the autograph. Their mother is killed during the anti-Muslim Bombay riots. Having escaped the riots and taken shelter from the rain, the brothers meet Latika, a girl from their slum. Jamal suggests that she could be their "third musketeer", a reference to The Three Musketeers, a novel which the brothers learned about in school. The brothers refer to themselves as Athos and Porthos but cannot remember the third musketeer's name.

The trio are found by Maman—a gangster who trains street children to become beggars. After witnessing Maman blinding the children with hot oil to make them more effective beggars, Salim escapes with Jamal and Latika. The brothers board a moving train, but Latika cannot keep up. Salim grabs her hand but purposely lets go in revenge for a prank Latika had pulled the night before, leaving her to be recaptured by Maman. For the next years, Salim and Jamal travel on top of trains, making a living by selling goods, pickpocketing, washing dishes, and pretending to be tour guides at the Taj Mahal. At Jamal's insistence, they return to Mumbai to find Latika and discover that Maman is raising her to be a prostitute. The brothers rescue her, with Salim shooting Maman dead. Impressed by this, Javed—a rival crime lord, grants Salim a job. In their room, Salim orders Jamal to leave him alone with Latika, presumably to sexually assault her. When Jamal refuses, Salim draws a gun on him, and Latika persuades Jamal to leave.

In 2004, Jamal, now working as a chaiwala in a call centre, learns that Salim is a high-ranking lieutenant in Javed's crime organisation. Jamal confronts Salim, who pleads for forgiveness. Jamal then sneaks into Javed's residence and reunites with Latika. Although he professes his love for her, she tells him to forget her. Despite the refusal, Jamal promises to wait for her every day at five o'clock at Victoria Terminus. Attempting to meet him there, Latika is captured by Javed's men, led by Salim. He scars her face while driving away. Jamal loses contact with Latika and in a final attempt to reach her, he becomes a contestant on Kaun Banega Crorepati, knowing that she watches the show.

Jamal plays well and becomes popular across India, much to the jealousy and dismay of the show's host, Prem Kumar. Kumar attempts to trick Jamal by feeding him the wrong answer to the penultimate question; however, Jamal answers correctly. When the episode ends, Jamal is arrested and tortured by police Kumar had subsequently called over, who suspect him of cheating. The police inspector eventually believes Jamal's explanations of how he knew each answer, and allows him to return to the show. Latika sees that Jamal was arrested on the news. Feeling guilty about his past behaviour, Salim gives Latika his phone and car keys, asking her to forgive him. After Latika leaves, Salim fills a bathtub with money and sits in it, waiting for Javed to realise what happened.

For the final ₹2 crore question, Jamal is asked the name of the third musketeer. Jamal admits to not knowing the answer and uses his "Phone-A-Friend" lifeline to call Salim because it is the only phone number he knows. Latika answers and tells Jamal that she is safe, but does not know the answer. Javed hears Latika on the show and realises that Salim betrayed him. He and his men break down the bathroom door. Salim kills Javed before getting killed by the gang. Relieved about Latika, Jamal guesses and picks the first answer, Aramis. He is correct and wins the grand prize. Jamal and Latika meet on the platform at the train station and kiss.

== Cast ==
- Dev Patel as Jamal Malik, a boy born and raised in the poverty of Bombay/Mumbai. Boyle considered hundreds of young male actors, and he found that Indian film leads were generally "strong, handsome hero-types". Boyle's daughter pointed out Dev Patel from his role in the British television ensemble drama Skins.
  - Tanay Hemant Chheda as young Jamal
  - Ayush Mahesh Khedekar as younger Jamal
- Freida Pinto as Latika, a girl from the streets who joins Jamal and Salim, then disappears; Jamal spends years hunting for her. Pinto was an Indian model who had not starred in a feature film. Regarding the "one of a kind" scarf she wears, designer Suttirat Anne Larlarb says, "I wanted to bookend the journey—to tie her childhood yellow dress to her final look."
  - Tanvi Ganesh Lonkar as young Latika
  - Rubina Ali as younger Latika
- Madhur Mittal as Salim Malik, Jamal's elder brother
  - Ashutosh Lobo Gajiwala as young Salim
  - Azharuddin Mohammed Ismail as younger Salim
- Anil Kapoor as Prem Kumar, the game show host. Boyle initially wanted Indian actor Shah Rukh Khan to play the role. Khan had hosted the 2007 series of Kaun Banega Crorepati. Kapoor has also starred as a guest on the show with Amitabh Bachchan and won Rs 5,000,000.
- Irrfan Khan as Police Inspector
- Saurabh Shukla as Police Constable Srinivas
- Mahesh Manjrekar as Javed Khan, the crime boss
- Ankur Vikal as Maman, the rival crime boss and child kidnapper
- Rajendranath Zutshi as Millionaire show producer
- Sanchita Choudhary as Jamal's and Salim's mother
- Mia Drake Inderbitzin as Adele, an American tourist
- Siddhesh Patil as Arvind, blind beggar
- Shruti Seth as Call Center Instructor
- Arfi Lamba as Bardi
- Anjum Sharma as one of the call center operators

== Production and producer ==
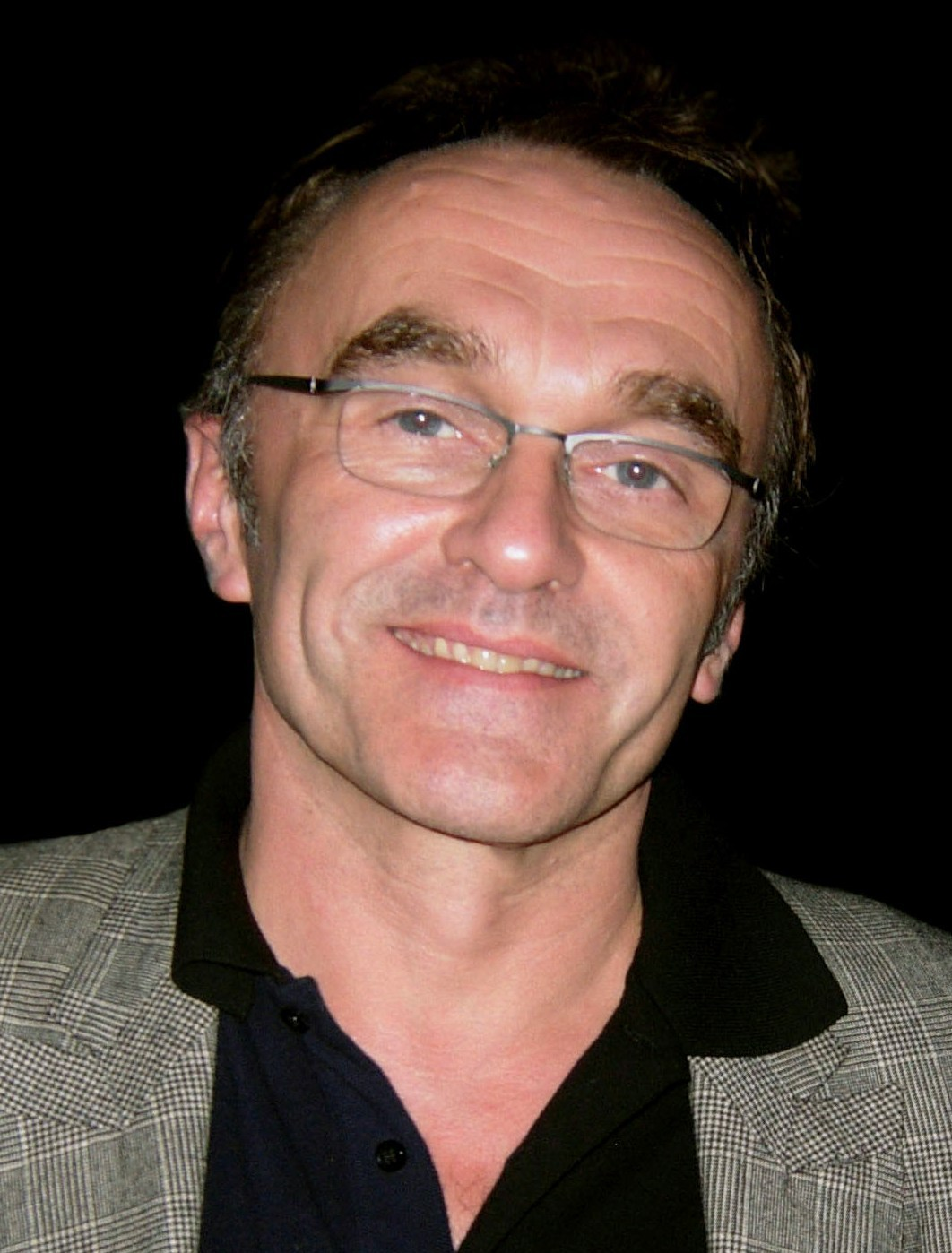
Danny Boyle directed the film

Screenwriter Simon Beaufoy wrote Slumdog Millionaire based on the Boeke Prize-winning and Commonwealth Writers' Prize-nominated novel Q & A by Vikas Swarup. To hone the script, Beaufoy made three research trips to India and interviewed street children, finding himself impressed with their attitudes. The screenwriter said of his goal for the script: "I wanted to get (across) the sense of this huge amount of fun, laughter, chat, and sense of community that is in these slums. What you pick up on is this mass of energy."

By the summer of 2006, British production companies Celador Films and Film4 Productions invited director Danny Boyle to read the script of Slumdog Millionaire. Boyle hesitated, since he was not interested in making a film about Who Wants to Be a Millionaire?, which was produced by Celador. Then Boyle learned that the screenwriter was Beaufoy, who had written The Full Monty (1997), one of the director's favourite British films, and decided to revisit the script. Boyle was impressed by how Beaufoy wove the multiple storylines from Swarup's book into one narrative, and the director decided to commit to the project. The film was projected to cost $15 million, so Celador sought a US film distributor to share costs. Warner Independent Pictures gave $5 million and got the rights to the film.

Gail Stevens came on board to oversee casting globally. Stevens had worked with Boyle throughout his career and was well known for discovering new talent. Meredith Tucker was appointed to cast out of the US. The filmmakers then travelled to Mumbai in September 2007 with a partial crew and began hiring local cast and crew for production in Karjat. Originally appointed as one of the five casting directors in India, Loveleen Tandan has stated, "I suggested to Danny and Simon Beaufoy, the writer of Slumdog, that it was important to do some of it in Hindi to bring the film alive [...] They asked me to pen the Hindi dialogues which I, of course, instantly agreed to do. And as we drew closer to the shoot date, Danny asked me to step in as the co-director." Boyle then decided to translate nearly a third of the film's English dialogue into Hindi. The director fibbed to Warner Independent's president that he wanted 10% of the dialogue in Hindi, and she approved the change. Riz Ahmed auditioned for the role of Salim Malik. Filming locations included shooting in Mumbai's megaslum and in shantytown parts of Juhu, so film-makers controlled the crowds by befriending onlookers. Filming began on 5 November 2007.

In addition to Swarup's original novel Q & A, the film was also inspired by Indian cinema. Tandan has referred to Slumdog Millionaire as a homage to Hindi cinema, noting that "Simon Beaufoy studied Salim–Javed's kind of cinema minutely." Boyle has cited the influence of several Bollywood films set in Mumbai.^{[i]} Deewaar (1975), which Boyle described as being "absolutely key to Indian cinema", is a crime film written by Salim-Javed based on the Bombay gangster Haji Mastan, portrayed by Bollywood superstar Amitabh Bachchan, whose autograph Jamal seeks at the beginning of Slumdog Millionaire. Anil Kapoor noted that some scenes of the film "are like Deewaar, the story of two brothers of whom one is completely after money while the younger one is honest and not interested in money." Slumdog Millionaire has a similar narrative structure to Deewaar. Satya (1998), written by Saurabh Shukla (who plays Constable Srinivas in Slumdog Millionaire), and Company (2002), based on the D-Company, both offered "slick, often mesmerising portrayals of the Mumbai underworld" and displayed realistic "brutality and urban violence." Boyle has also stated that the chase in one of the opening scenes of Slumdog Millionaire was based on a "12-minute police chase through the crowded Dharavi slum" in Black Friday (2007), adapted from Hussein Zaidi's book of the same name about the 1993 Bombay bombings.

Boyle has cited other Indian films as influences in later interviews.^{[ii]} The rags-to-riches, underdog theme was also a recurring theme in classic Bollywood movies from the 1950s through to the 1980s, when "India worked to lift itself from hunger and poverty." Other classic Bollywood tropes in the film include "the fantasy sequences" and the montage sequence where "the brothers jump off a train and suddenly they are seven years older".

The producer's first choice for the role of Prem Kumar was Shah Rukh Khan, an established Bollywood star and host of the 2007 series of Kaun Banega Crorepati (the Indian version of Who Wants to Be a Millionaire?). However, Khan turned down the role, concerned that he did not want to give his audience the impression that the real show was a fraud by playing a fraudulent host in the movie. Despite the film's success, Khan said that he does not regret turning down the role, and has been a vociferous supporter of the film to its critics. Paul Smith, the executive producer of Slumdog Millionaire and the chairman of Celador Films, previously owned the international rights to Who Wants to Be a Millionaire?

The cinematography was handled by Anthony Dod Mantle, using mainly digital cinematography rather than traditional film cinematography. It was shot on a digital camera, the Silicon Imaging SI-2K video camera, in 2K resolution digital video. It was the first film to take full advantage of the SI-2K digital camera.

== Soundtrack ==
The Slumdog Millionaire soundtrack was composed by A. R. Rahman, who planned the score for over two months and completed it in two weeks. Danny Boyle has said that he chose Rahman because "not only does he draw on Indian classical music, but he's got R&B and hip hop coming in from America, house music coming in from Europe and this incredible fusion is created." Rahman won the 2009 Golden Globe Award for Best Original Score and won two Academy Awards, one for Best Original Score and one for Best Original Song for "Jai Ho". Rahman had two songs nominated for Best Original Song – the nomination for "O... Saya" was shared with M.I.A., while the win for "Jai Ho" was shared with lyricist Gulzar. The soundtrack was released on M.I.A.'s record label N.E.E.T. On Radio Sargam, film critic Goher Iqbal Punn termed the soundtrack Rahman's "magnum opus" which will acquaint "the entire world" with his artistry.

== Release ==
=== Theatrical ===
In August 2007, Warner Independent Pictures acquired the U.S. and Canadian rights and Pathé the international rights to distribute Slumdog Millionaire theatrically with a release date of November 7, 2008. However, in May 2008, Warner Independent Pictures was announced to be shutting down, with all of its remaining projects being transferred to Warner Bros. Pictures, its parent studio.^{[iv]} Warner Bros. doubted the commercial prospects of Slumdog Millionaire and suggested that it would go direct to video without a U.S. theatrical release under the Warner Premiere label. In August 2008, the studio began searching for buyers for various productions, to relieve its overload of end-of-the-year films. Halfway through the month, Warner Bros. entered a pact with Fox Searchlight Pictures to share distribution of the film, with Fox Searchlight buying 50% of Warner Bros.'s interest in the film and handling US distribution.

=== Home media ===
The film was released on DVD and Blu-ray in the United States on 31 March 2009. It opened at No. 2 in the DVD sales chart, making $14.16m from 842,000 DVD units. As of 12 November 2009, an estimated 1,964,962 DVD units have been sold, for $31.32m in revenue. This figure does not include Blu-ray sales/DVD rentals. It had previously been announced that 20th Century Fox Home Entertainment would be starting a new marketing program with two versions of each release: a stripped-down minimal version for the rental market, and a traditional full version with "bonus extra" features, such as commentary and "making of" material, for the retail market. The release production was mixed up; some full versions were shipped in rental cases, and some retail versions were missing the extras despite their being listed on the box. Public apologies were issued by Fox and Amazon.

In the United Kingdom, the film was released on DVD and Blu-ray on 1 June 2009. It was 2009's fifth best-selling film on home video retail in the United Kingdom, third best-selling British film, and overall best-selling British independent film in the UK. It was also the year's top online video rental in the UK. On UK television, it was watched by 5.2 million viewers on Channel 4 in 2010, making it the year's fifth most-watched film on UK television, the fourth most-watched British film, and the year's most-watched Channel 4 film.

== Reception ==
=== Box office ===
Following its success at the 81st Academy Awards, the film topped the worldwide box office (barring North America), grossing $16 million from 34 markets in the week following the Academy Awards. Worldwide, it has grossed $378 million, becoming Fox Searchlight Pictures's highest-grossing film ever (surpassing Juno). It was the year's second highest-grossing British film worldwide (below Harry Potter and the Half-Blood Prince) and the most successful British independent film of all time.

==== North America ====
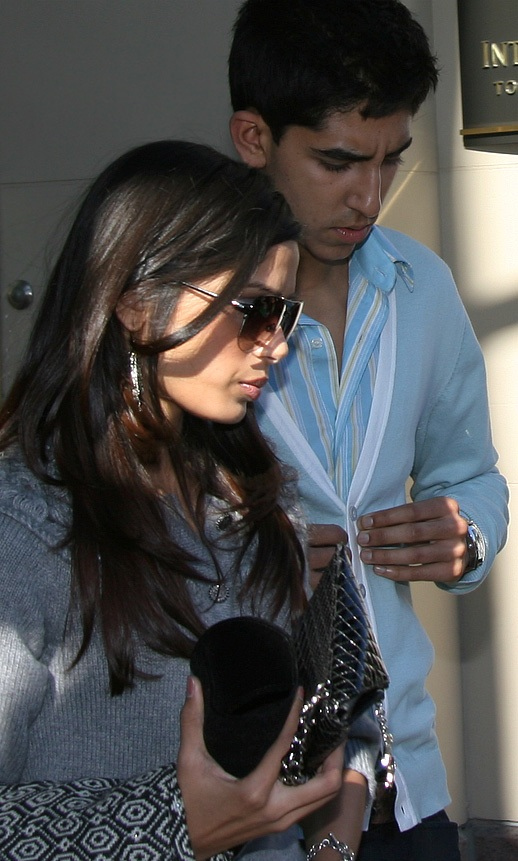
Stars Dev Patel and Freida Pinto at the 2008 Toronto International Film Festival

Slumdog Millionaire was first shown at the Telluride Film Festival on 30 August 2008, where it was positively received, generating "strong buzz". It also screened at the Toronto International Film Festival on 7 September 2008, where it was the festival's "first widely acknowledged popular success", winning the People's Choice Award. It debuted with a limited North American release on 12 November 2008, followed by a nationwide US release on 23 January 2009.

After debuting on a Wednesday, the film grossed $360,018 in 10 theatres in its first weekend, a strong average of $36,002 per theatre. In its second weekend, it expanded to 32 theatres and made $947,795, or an average of $29,619 per theatre, representing a drop of only 18%. In the 10 original theatres of its release, viewership went up 16%, and this is attributed to strong word-of-mouth. The film expanded into wide release on 25 December 2008 at 614 theatres and earned $5,647,007 over the extended Christmas weekend. Following its success at the 81st Academy Awards, the film's earnings increased by 43%, the most for any film since Titanic. In the weekend of 27 February to 1 March, it reached its widest release at 2,943 theatres. It has grossed over $140 million at the North American box office.

==== Europe ====
The film was released in the United Kingdom on 9 January 2009, and opened at #2 at the UK box office. It reached #1 in its second weekend and set a UK box office record, as the film's earnings increased by 47%, the "biggest ever increase for a UK saturation release," breaking "the record previously held by Billy Elliot's 13%". This record-breaking "ticket surge" in the second weekend came after Slumdog Millionaire won four Golden Globes and received eleven BAFTA nominations. It grossed £6.1 million in its first eleven days in the UK. Its earnings increased by another 7% the following weekend, bringing its total gross up to £10.24 million for its first 17 days in the UK, and up to £14.2 million in its third week.

As of 20 February 2009, the film's UK box office gross was £22,973,110, making it "the eighth biggest hit at UK cinemas of the past 12 months." In the week ending 1 March 2009, following its success at the 81st Academy Awards where it won eight Oscars, the film returned to No. 1 at the UK box office, grossing £26 million as of 2 March 2009. As of 17 May 2009, the total UK gross was over £31.6 million. It topped the UK box office for four weeks, more than any other film in 2009 (longer than Harry Potter and the Half-Blood Prince, which spent three weeks at the top). It was the year's highest-grossing drama film in the UK, and the year's highest-grossing film rated 15 by the British Board of Film Classification (BBFC). The film's UK audience demographic breakdown was 50% male and 50% female, with 80% under 55 and 20% over 55, and 32% in London. It became the highest-grossing British independent film ever at the UK box office, surpassing Four Weddings and a Funeral (1994), as well as the 20th highest-grossing British film ever at the UK box office and the highest-grossing domestic British film ever without US studio investment.

The film's success at the Academy Awards led to large increases in earnings elsewhere in Europe the following week. Its biggest single-country increase was in Italy, where it was up 556% from the previous week. Its earnings in France and Spain also increased by 61% and 73% respectively. During the same week, the film debuted in other European countries with successful openings: in Croatia it grossed $170,419 from ten screens, making it the biggest opening there in the previous four months; and in Poland it opened in second place with a gross of $715,677. It was released in Sweden on 6 March 2009 and in Germany on 19 March 2009. It has sold 17,807,302 box office tickets in Europe as of 2020.

==== India ====
In India, the premiere of Slumdog Millionaire took place in Mumbai on 22 January 2009 and was attended by major personalities of the Indian film industry, with more than a hundred attending this event. A dubbed Hindi version, Slumdog Crorepati (स्लमडॉग करोड़पति), was also released in India in addition to the original version of the film. The name was changed as Indians are more familiar with Indian numbering, including the crore, than the Western numbering of one million. Originally titled Slumdog Millionaire: Kaun Banega Crorepati, the name was shortened for legal reasons. Loveleen Tandan, who supervised the dubbing, stated, "All the actors from the original English including Anil Kapoor, Irrfan Khan and Ankur Vikal dubbed the film. We got a boy from Chembur, Pratik Motwani to dub for the male lead Dev Patel. I didn't want any exaggerated dubbing. I wanted a young unspoilt voice." The film was also dubbed in Tamil as Naanum Kodeeswaran, with Silambarasan dubbing for Patel, while S. P. Balasubrahmanyam and Radha Ravi dubbed for Kapoor and Khan respectively.

Fox Searchlight, with Fox Star Studios, released 351 prints of the film across India for its full release there on 23 January 2009. It earned ₹2,35,45,665 (equivalent to ₹65 million or US$670,000 in 2026) in its first week at the Indian box office, or $2.2 million according to Fox Searchlight. Though not as successful as major film releases in India during its first week, this was the highest weekend gross for any Fox film and the third highest for any Western release in the country, trailing only Spider-Man 3 and Casino Royale. In its second week, the film's gross rose to ₹3,04,70,752 (equivalent to ₹84 million or US$870,000 in 2026) at the Indian box office.

A few analysts have offered their opinions about the film's performance at the Indian box office. Trade analyst Komal Nahta commented, "There was a problem with the title itself. Slumdog is not a familiar word for [the] majority [of] Indians." In addition, trade analyst Amod Mehr has stated that with the exception of Anil Kapoor, the film lacks recognisable stars and that "the film... is not ideally suited for Indian sentiment." A cinema owner commented that "to hear slum boys speaking perfect English doesn't seem right but when they are speaking in Hindi, the film seems much more believable." The dubbed Hindi version, Slumdog Crorepati, did better at the box office, and additional copies of that version were released. Following the film's success at the 81st Academy Awards, the film's takings in India increased by 470% the following week, bringing its total up to $6.3 million that week. As of 15 March 2009, Slumdog Crorepati had grossed ₹158,613,802 (equivalent to ₹440 million or US$4.5 million in 2026) at the Indian box office.

==== Asia-Pacific ====
The film's success at the Academy Awards led to it seeing large increases in takings in the Asia-Pacific region. In Australia, the takings increased by 53%, bringing the film up to second place there. In Hong Kong, the film debuted taking $1 million in its opening weekend, making it the second biggest opening of the year there. The film was released in Japan on 18 April 2009, South Korea on 19 March 2009, China on 26 March 2009, Vietnam on 10 April 2009, and 11 April 2009 in the Philippines.

In particular, the film was a major success in East Asia. In the People's Republic of China, the film grossed $2.2 million in its opening weekend (27–29 March). In Japan, the film grossed $12 million, the most the film has grossed in any Asian country.

=== Critical reception ===
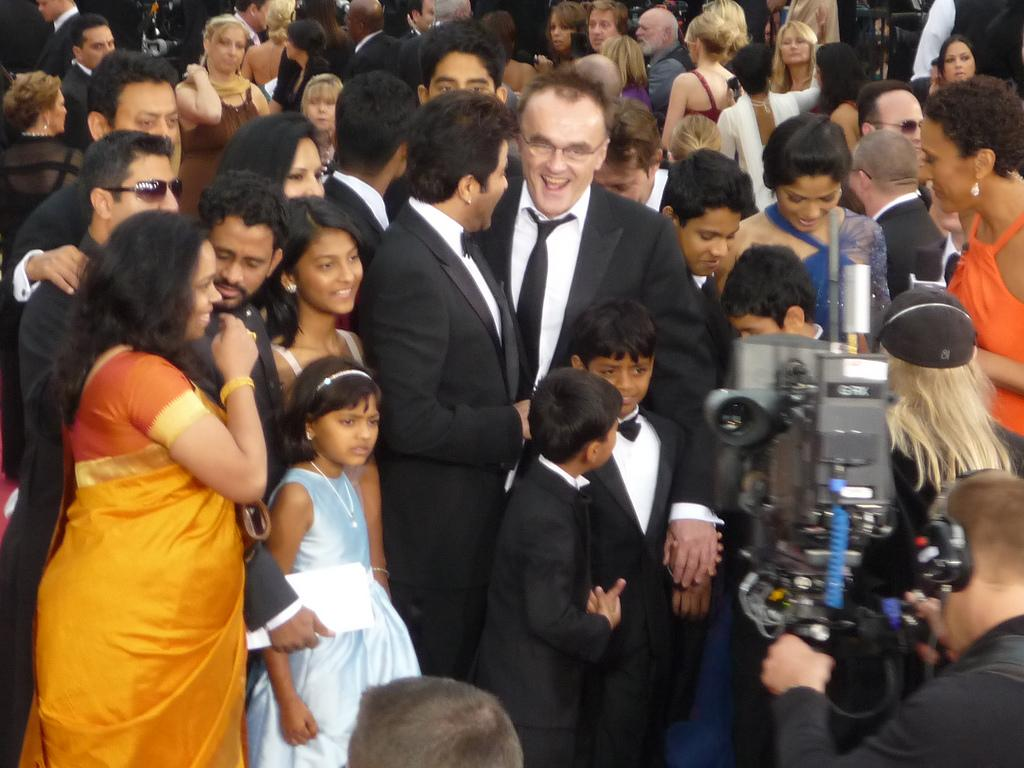
The Slumdog Millionaire team at the 81st Academy Awards in the US

Outside of India, Slumdog Millionaire was met with critical acclaim. The film holds a 91% approval rating on Rotten Tomatoes based on 290 reviews, with an average score of 8.4/10. The consensus reads, "Visually dazzling and emotionally resonant, Slumdog Millionaire is a film that's both entertaining and powerful." On Metacritic, the film has an average score of 86 out of 100, based on 36 reviews, indicating "universal acclaim". Movie City News shows that the film appeared in 123 different top ten lists, out of 286 different critics lists surveyed, the 4th most mentions on a top ten list of any film released in 2008.

Roger Ebert of the Chicago Sun-Times gave the film four out of four stars, calling it "a breathless, exciting story, heartbreaking and exhilarating." Wall Street Journal critic Joe Morgenstern refers to Slumdog Millionaire as, "the film world's first globalised masterpiece." Ann Hornaday of The Washington Post argues that, "this modern-day 'rags-to-rajah' fable won the audience award at the Toronto International Film Festival earlier this year, and it's easy to see why. With its timely setting of a swiftly globalising India and, more specifically, the country's own version of the Who Wants to Be a Millionaire TV show, combined with timeless melodrama and a hardworking orphan who withstands all manner of setbacks, Slumdog Millionaire plays like Charles Dickens for the 21st century." Kenneth Turan of the Los Angeles Times describes the film as "a Hollywood-style romantic melodrama that delivers major studio satisfactions in an ultra-modern way" and "a story of star-crossed romance that the original Warner brothers would have embraced, shamelessly pulling out stops that you wouldn't think anyone would have the nerve to attempt any more."

Anthony Lane of the New Yorker stated, "There is a mismatch here. Boyle and his team, headed by the director of photography, Anthony Dod Mantle, clearly believe that a city like Mumbai, with its shifting skyline and a population of more than fifteen million, is as ripe for storytelling as Dickens's London [...] At the same time, the story they chose is sheer fantasy, not in its glancing details but in its emotional momentum. How else could Boyle get away with assembling his cast for a Bollywood dance number, at a railroad station, over the closing credits? You can either chide the film, at this point, for relinquishing any claim to realism or you can go with the flow—surely the wiser choice." Colm Andrew of the Manx Independent was also full of praise, saying the film "successfully mixes hard-hitting drama with uplifting action and the Who Wants To Be a Millionaire show is an ideal device to revolve events around". Several other reviewers have described Slumdog Millionaire as a Bollywood-style "masala" movie, due to the way the film combines "familiar raw ingredients into a feverish masala" and culminates in "the romantic leads finding each other."

Other critics offered more mixed reviews. For example, Peter Bradshaw of The Guardian gave the film three out of five stars, stating that "despite the extravagant drama and some demonstrations of the savagery meted out to India's street children, this is a cheerfully undemanding and unreflective film with a vision of India that, if not touristy exactly, is certainly an outsider's view; it depends for its full enjoyment on not being taken too seriously." He also pointed out that the film is co-produced by Celador, who own the rights to the original Who Wants to Be a Millionaire? and claimed that "it functions as a feature-length product placement for the programme."

A few critics outright panned it. Mick LaSalle of the San Francisco Chronicle states that, "Slumdog Millionaire has a problem in its storytelling. The movie unfolds in a start-and-stop way that kills suspense, leans heavily on flashbacks and robs the movie of most of its velocity. ... [T]he whole construction is tied to a gimmicky narrative strategy that keeps Slumdog Millionaire from really hitting its stride until the last 30 minutes. By then, it's just a little too late." Eric Hynes of IndieWire called it "bombastic", "a noisy, sub-Dickens update on the romantic tramp's tale" and "a goofy picaresque to rival Forrest Gump in its morality and romanticism."

=== Reactions from India and the Indian diaspora ===
Slumdog Millionaire has been a subject of discussion among a variety of people in India and the Indian diaspora. Some film critics have responded positively to the film; others objected to issues such as Jamal's use of British English or the fact that similar films by Indian filmmakers have not received equal recognition. A few notable filmmakers such as Aamir Khan and Priyadarshan have been critical of the film. Author and critic Salman Rushdie argues that it has "a patently ridiculous conceit."

Adoor Gopalakrishnan, one of the most acclaimed film makers in India during the 1980s and 1990s and a five-time Best Director winner of the Indian National Film Awards, lambasted Slumdog Millionaire, calling it in an interview to NDTV: "A very anti-Indian film. All the bad elements of Bombay's commercial cinema are put together and in a very slick way. And it underlines and endorses what the West thinks about us. It is falsehood built upon falsehood. And at every turn is fabricated. At every turn it is built on falsehood. I was ashamed to see it was being appreciated widely in the west... Fortunately Indians are turning it down."

=== Academic criticism ===
The film has been subject to academic criticism. Mitu Sengupta (2009 and 2010) raises substantial doubts about both the realism of the film's portrayal of urban poverty in India and whether the film will assist those arguing for the poor. Rather, Sengupta argues the film's "reductive view" of such slums is likely to reinforce negative attitudes to those who live there. The film is therefore likely to support policies that have tended to further dispossess the slum dwellers in terms of material goods, power and dignity. The film, it is also suggested, celebrates characters and places that might be seen as symbolic of Western culture and models of development. Ana Cristina Mendes (2010) places Boyle's film in the context of the aestheticising and showcasing of poverty in India for artistic (and commercial) purposes, and proceeds to examine "the modes of circulation of these representations in the field of cultural production, as well as their role in enhancing the processes of ever-increasing consumption of India-related images."

However, there are others who point to the changing urban aspirations and prospects for mobility that can be seen in Indian cities such as Mumbai in which the film is set. The film is seen by D. Parthasarathy (2009) as reflecting a larger context of global cultural flows, which implicates issues of labour, status, ascription-achievement, and poverty in urban India. Parthasarathy (2009) argues for a better understanding of issues of dignity of labour and that the film should be interpreted in a more nuanced way as reflecting the role of market forces and India's new service economy in transforming the caste and status determined opportunity structure in urban India.

Academic criticism has also been extended to the underlying philosophy of the film, with its apparent ends-justify-means message. Many elements of the film, including the apparent redemption of Salim at the end of his life and the film's subjugation of the suffering of peripheral characters to the romantic aspirations of Jamal, are characteristic, say such critics, of a naïve, Providence-based vision of reality.

== Musical adaptation ==
It was announced on November 1, 2024, that a musical adaptation of the film is in the works. The musical will be produced by Two-time Tony Award winner Ken Davenport, with music and lyrics by A.R. Rahman.

== Accolades ==
81st Academy Awards
1. Best Picture, Christian Colson
2. Best Director, Danny Boyle
3. Best Adapted Screenplay, Simon Beaufoy
4. Best Cinematography, Anthony Dod Mantle
5. Best Film Editing, Chris Dickens
6. Best Original Score, A. R. Rahman
7. Best Original Song – "Jai Ho", music by A. R. Rahman, lyric by Gulzar (lyricist)
8. Best Sound Mixing, Resul Pookutty, Richard Pryke, and Ian Tapp
62nd British Academy Film Awards
1. Best Film, Christian Colson
2. Best Director, Danny Boyle
3. Best Adapted Screenplay, Simon Beaufoy
4. Best Cinematography, Anthony Dod Mantle
5. Best Film Music, A. R. Rahman
6. Best Editing, Chris Dickens
7. Best Sound, Glenn Freemantle, Resul Pookutty, Richard Pyke, Tom Sayers, Ian Tapp
66th Golden Globe Awards
1. Best Picture – Drama
2. Best Director, Danny Boyle
3. Best Screenplay, Simon Beaufoy
4. Best Original Score, A. R. Rahman
24th Goya Awards
1. Best European Film

Slumdog Millionaire was critically acclaimed and named in the top ten lists of various newspapers. On 22 February 2009, the film won eight out of ten Academy Awards for which it was nominated, including Best Picture and Best Director. It was the fifteenth film to win at least eight Academy Awards. It was the eleventh Best Picture Oscar winner without a single acting nomination, the last film to do so until Parasite in 2019. At the same time, Taare Zameen Par (Like Stars on Earth), India's submission for the Academy Award for Best Foreign Film, failed to make the short list of nominations and was frequently compared with Slumdog Millionaire in the Indian media.

It was also the first film shot using digital cinematography to win the Academy Award for Best Cinematography, which was given to Anthony Dod Mantle. The film also won seven of the eleven BAFTA Awards for which it was nominated, including Best Film; all four of the Golden Globe Awards for which it was nominated, including Best Drama Film; and five of the six Critics' Choice Awards for which it was nominated. The title sequence was nominated at the 2009 Rushes Soho Shorts Film Festival in the Broadcast Design Award category in competition with the Match of the Day Euro 2008 titles by Aardman and two projects by Agenda Collective.

In 2010, the Independent Film & Television Alliance selected the film as one of the 30 Most Significant Independent Films of the last 30 years. In 2021, members of Writers Guild of America West (WGAW) and Writers Guild of America, East (WGAE) ranked its screenplay 38th in WGA’s 101 Greatest Screenplays of the 21st Century (So Far).

In 2025, it was one of the films voted for the "Readers' Choice" edition of The New York Times' list of "The 100 Best Movies of the 21st Century," finishing at number 163.

== Notes ==
- ^{i} Specifically, in the Kumar article, Boyle referred to Deewaar (1975) by Yash Chopra and Salim–Javed, Satya (1998) and Company (2002) by Ram Gopal Verma, and Black Friday (2007) by Anurag Kashyap.
- ^{ii} Some of the other Indian films cited by Boyle as reference points for the film include Satyajit Ray's Pather Panchali (1955), Mira Nair films such as Salaam Bombay! (1988), Ashutosh Gowariker's Lagaan (2001), and Aamir Khan's Taare Zameen Par (2007).
- ^{iii} Fox Searchlight Pictures distributed Slumdog Millionaire theatrically in the United States under a shared distribution agreement with Warner Bros. Pictures; Pathé themselves distributed the film in its native United Kingdom, the studio's native France and through their own distribution division in Switzerland named Monopole-Pathé while other independent distributors released the film in other territories. Pathé would fully acquire the copyright to the film in October 2024 following the sale of Celador's film catalogue to them.
- ^{iv} Warner Bros. Clockwork later founded on December 18, 2025, with its name officially revealed at the 2026 CinemaCon on April 14, 2026.

== See also ==
- List of Indian winners and nominees of the Golden Globe Awards
- Mahal Kita, Final Answer - a Filipino romantic comedy film with slightly different plot but features Who Wants to Be a Millionaire in it.
