= Maharashtra Housing and Area Development Authority =

State government agency in Maharashtra, India

- Official Seal of MHADA

Agency overview
- Formed: 1977
- Jurisdiction: Maharashtra
- Headquarters: Bandra East, Mumbai, Maharashtra
- Agency executive: Sanjeev Jaiswal, Vice President & Chief Executive Officer
- Parent agency: Ministry of Housing (Maharashtra)
- Website: https://www.mhada.gov.in/en

The Maharashtra Housing and Area Development Authority (MHADA) was established in 1977 and had a jurisdiction over the entire State of Maharashtra except for the Vidarbha region. This body undertook construction of residential buildings under various housing schemes for different sections of society. The allotment and maintenance of these buildings was being looked after by it. On the re-organization of the State, the Vidarbha Housing Board (VHB) was established in 1960 as a successor body to the erstwhile Madhya Pradesh Housing Board. It served the Amravati and Nagpur divisions of Maharashtra and its functions were similar to those of the MHB, except that it also advanced loan to co-operative housing societies, institutions, and local authorities for the construction of houses. The Bombay Building Repairs and Reconstruction Board was constituted in 1971. It was created to deal with the problems faced by tenants residing in dilapidated buildings in the Island City of Bombay and undertook its structural repairs and reconstruction to make them structurally sound and safe for habitation. The Bombay Slum Improvement Board was constituted in 1974, with intention to provide basic amenities, such as water taps, drainage, pathways, latrines and streetlights etc. in Bombay slums. To begin with, its activities were confined to the Mumbai City and Mumbai Suburban Districts. These activities were later extended to the remainder of Maharashtra upon the launch of the Maharashtra Housing & Area Development Authority (MHADA), as established by the Maharashtra Housing and Area Development Act, 1976.

MHB and VHB were merged into a single entity known as MHADA, and it came into existence on 5 December 1977. The erstwhile Bombay Housing and Area Development Board was restructured by a Government Resolution dated 5.11.1992 and split into three separate Boards viz. Bombay Housing and Area Development Board, Bombay Building Repairs and Reconstruction Board and Bombay Slum Improvement Board Under the Government Resolution No. 2679/B, dated 22.7.1992. At present, MHADA coordinates and controls the activities of seven regional housing boards and setup for each revenue division in the state viz. Mumbai, Konkan, Pune, Nashik, Nagpur, Amravati, Aurangabad and two special purpose boards viz. Mumbai Building Repairs and Reconstruction Board and Mumbai Slum Improvement Board. In Mumbai alone it has constructed about 3 lakh housing units.

Recently, MHADA has come out with a low cost housing scheme offering 2,593 apartments in Mumbai and Mira Road in its May 2012 Lottery Scheme. In a press conference on 28.08.2019 MHADA Chairman Uday Samant stated that MHADA may not call lottery for 3 years due to unavailability of housing stock. MHADA has stock of only 217 houses as of August 2019. On 6 August 2021, the organisation planned to initiate the process through a lottery system for allocation of low cost houses and will be situated in areas like Virar, Mira Road, Shirdhon, Khoni, Gotheghar, and Vengurla.

== Related websites ==
- Official Website
- Maha Housing Corporation
- Suraksha Smart City
