= List of beaches in India =

There are many beaches on the Indian coast which stretches for 11098.81 km both on the eastern and western coast. This is a list of the notable beaches in India sorted by states anti-clockwise.

== Blue Flag beaches ==
As of October 2025, India has following 18 Blue Flag beaches. The Blue Flag beach is an eco-label awarded to the beaches on the criteria of cleanliness, safety and security of users, amenities and eco-friendliness, etc. Counter-clockwise list:

- Odisha
  - Puri Beach or Puri beach in Puri.
  - Pati Sonepur Sea Beach in Ganjam district
- Andhra Pradesh
  - Rushikonda Beach in Visakhapatnam.
- Tamil Nadu
  - Kovalam beach, 40 km south of Chennai.
- Puducherry
  - Eden Beach in Chinna Veerampattinam.
- Andaman and Nicobar
  - Radhanagar beach or Beach No 7 in Havelock Islands.
- Lakshadweep
  - Minicoy Thundi beach in Minicoy.
  - Kadmat beach in Kadmat island.
- Kerala
  - Kappad beach on north fringe of Kozhikode.
  - Chal beach in Kannur.
- Karnataka
  - Kasarkod beach in Kasarkod village in Uttara Kannada district.
  - Padubidri Beach in Udupi district.
  - Tannirbhavi Beach in Mangaluru in Dakshina Kannada.
- Diu and Daman
  - Ghoghla beach in Diu.
- Gujarat
  - Shivrajpur beach in Dwarka, at Shivrajpur village 12 km from Dwarka on Dwarka-Okha Highway.
- Maharashtra
  - Shrivardhan beach in Raigad
  - Nagaon beach in Raigad
  - Parnaka beach in Palghar
  - Guhagar beach in Ratnagiri
  - Ladghar beach in Ratnagiri

== West coast ==
=== Gujarat ===
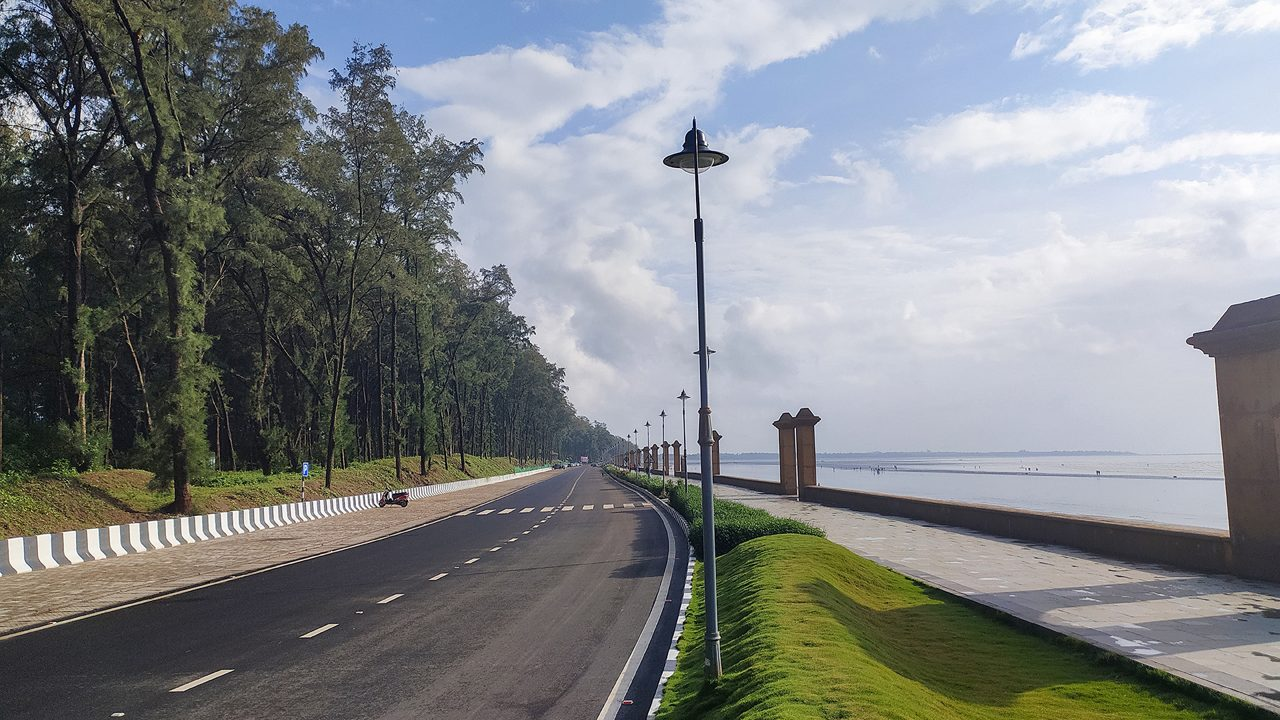
Jampore Beach, Daman

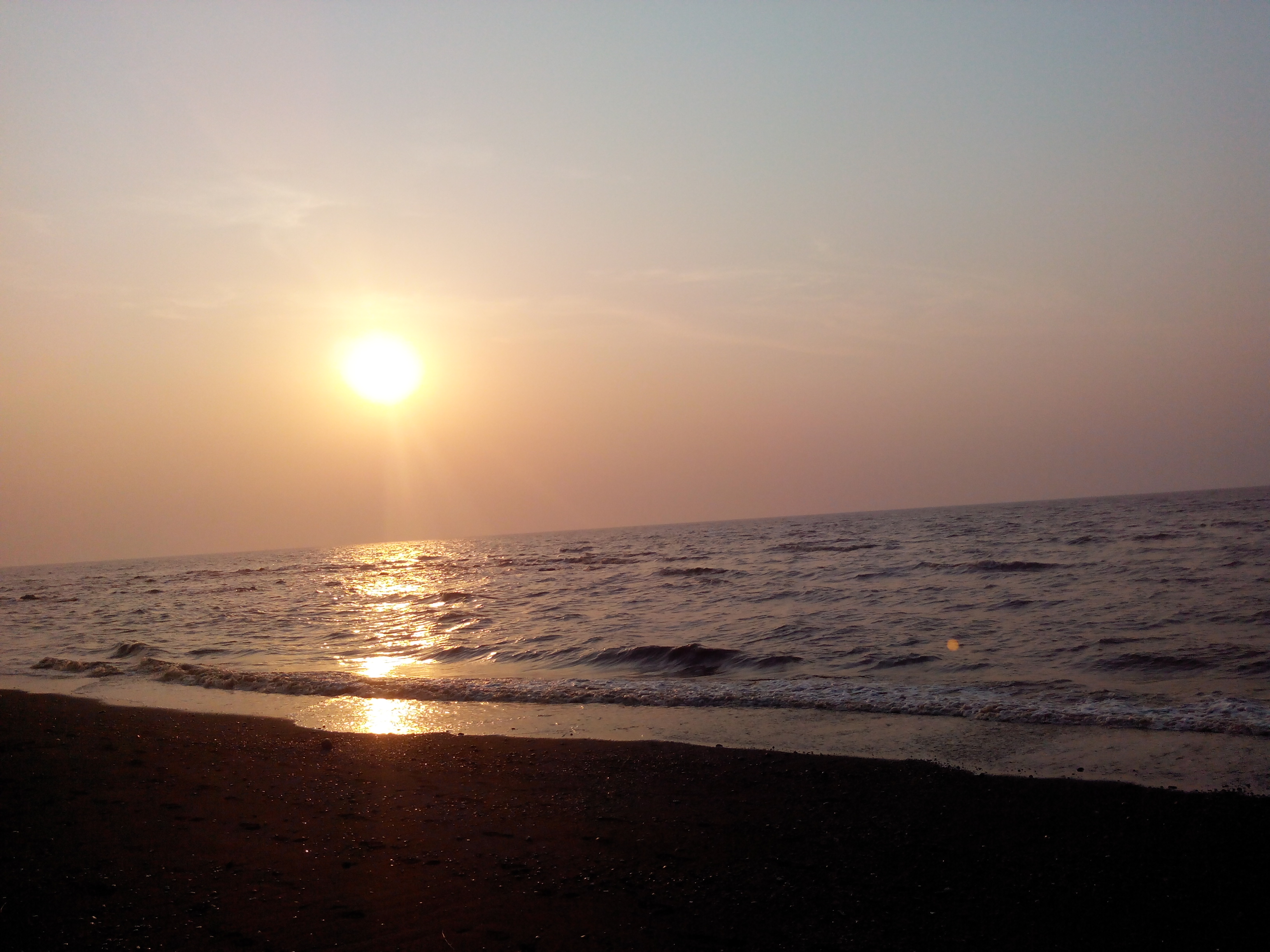
Devka Beach Daman

The beaches along the western state of Gujarat are:

- Jampore Beach
- Devka Beach
- Dumas Beach
- Suvali Beach
- Umbharat Beach
- Dandi Beach
- Dabhari beach
- Diu Beach
- Tithal Beach
- Mandavi Beach
- Khambhat Beach
- Shivrajpur Beach
- Oakha Madhi Beach
- Moti Daman Beach
- Nani Daman Beach
- Nagao Beach
- Jalandhar Beach
- Chakratirth(khupri) Beach
- Ahemedpur Mandvi(Gir Somnath) Beach
- Mahuva Beach
- Pingleshwar(kutch) Beach
- Madhavpur Beach

=== Maharashtra ===
The state of Maharashtra has:

- Aksa Beach
- Alibaug Beach
- Gorai Beach
- Juhu Beach
- Manori Beach
- Marvé Beach
- Versova Beach
- Agardanda Beach
- Diveagar Beach
- Ganpatipule Beach
- Guhagar Beach
- Kelwa Beach
- Tarkarli Beach
- Shivaji Park Beach
- Anjarle Beach
- Dapoli Beach
- Dahanu Beach
- Srivardhan beach
- Kihim Beach
- Mandwa Beach
- Velneshwar Beach
- Vengurla Beach
- Bassein Beach
- Bhandarpule Beach
- Nagaon Beach
- Revdanda Beach
- Rewas Beach
- Kashid Beach
- Karde (Murud) Beach
- Harihareshwar Beach
- Bagmandla Beach
- Kelshi Beach
- Harnai Beach
- Bordi Beach
- Ratnagiri Beach
- Awas Beach
- Sasawne Beach
- Malvan Beach

=== Goa ===
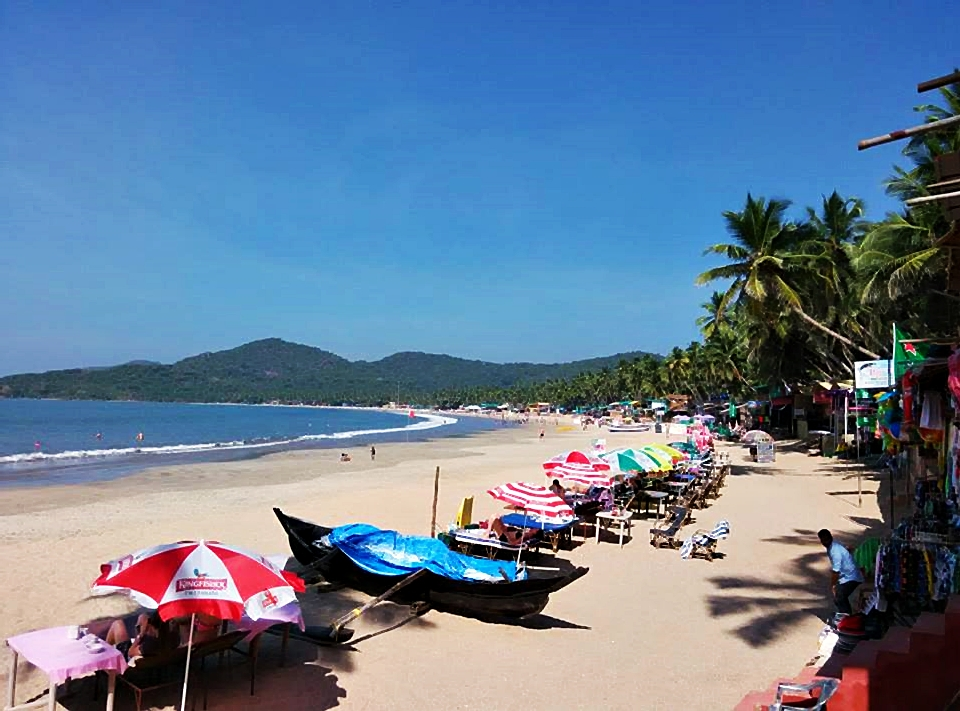
Palolem Beach

The beaches in the state of Goa are listed below:

- Agonda Beach
- Arambol Beach
- Benaulim Beach
- Cavelossim Beach
- Chapora Beach
- Mandrem Beach
- Palolem Beach
- Varca Beach
- Baga Beach
- Candolim Beach
- Calangute Beach
- Colva Beach
- Miramar Beach, Goa
- Morjim Beach
- Bambolim Beach
- Cabo de rama Beach
- Anjuna Beach
- Utorda Beach
- Majorda Beach
- Betalbatim Beach
- Sernabatim Beach
- Cavelossim Beach
- Mobor Beach
- Betul Beach
- Querim Beach
- Kalacha Beach
- Mandrem Beach
- Ashvem Beach
- Vagator Beach
- Ozran Beach
- Sinquerim Beach
- Coco Beach
- Kegdole Beach
- Caranzalem Beach
- Dona Paula Beach
- Vaiguinim Beach
- Siridao Beach
- Bogmalo Beach
- Baina Beach
- Hansa Beach
- Hollant Beach
- Cansaulim Beach
- Velsao Beach
- Canaiguinim Beach
- Kakolem Beach
- Dharvalem Beach
- Cola Beach
- Agonda Beach
- Palolem Beach
- Patnem Beach
- Rajbag Beach
- Talpona Beach
- Galgibag Beach
- Polem Beach
- Pebble Beach Goa

=== Karnataka ===
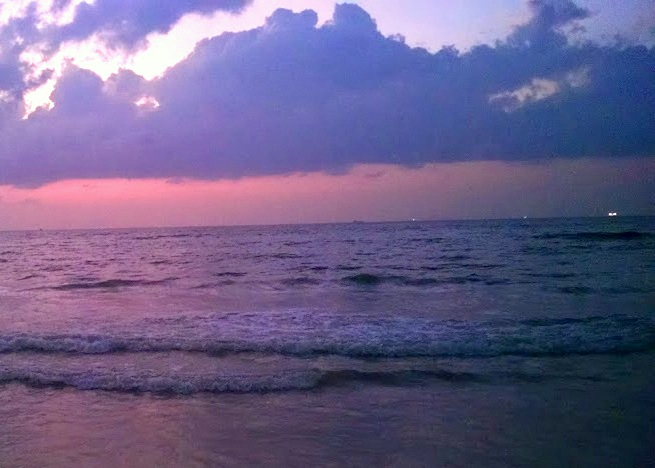
Sunset at Panambur Beach, Mangalore

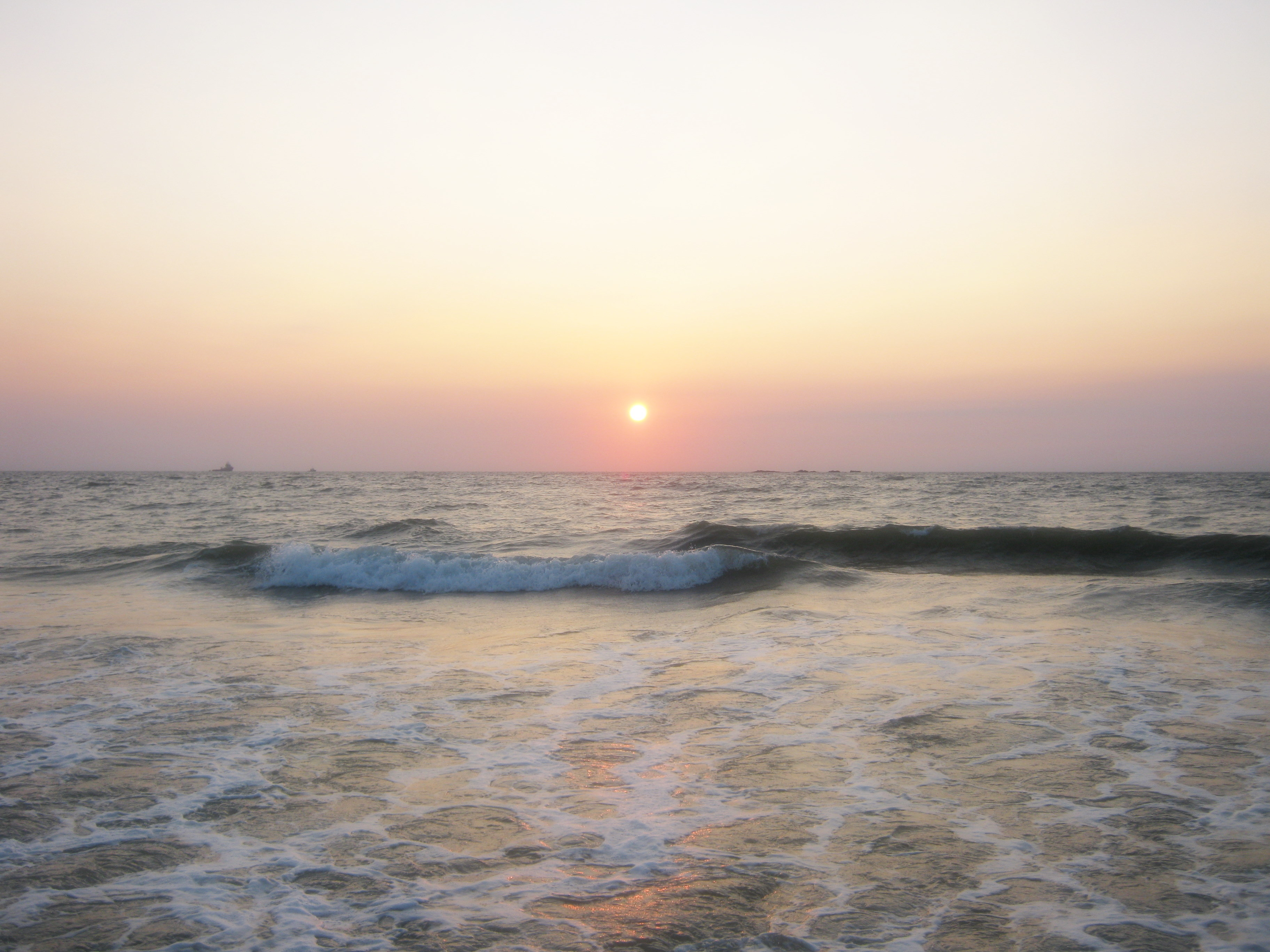
Malpe Beach, Udupi, India

- Karwar Beach
- Kudle beach
- Panambur Beach
- NITK Beach
- Sasihithlu Beach
- Maravanthe Beach
- Tannirubhavi Beach
- Malpe Beach
- Murudeshwara Beach
- Apsarakonda Beach
- Om Beach, Gokarna
- Kaup Beach
- Kodi Beach
- Someshwar Beach
- St Mary's Island Beach
- Mukka Beach
- Ullal beach

=== Kerala ===
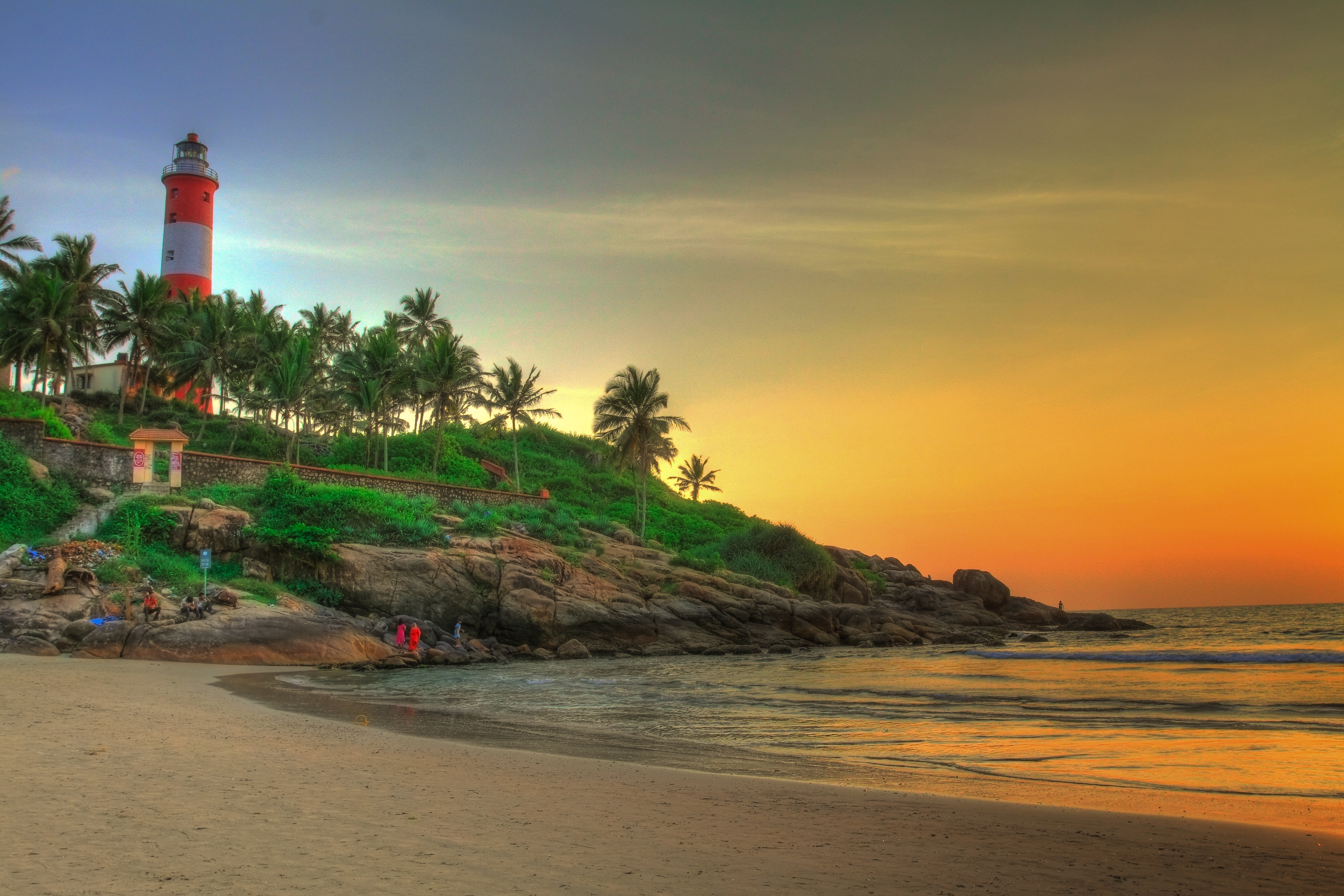
Kovalam Beach in Trivandrum city

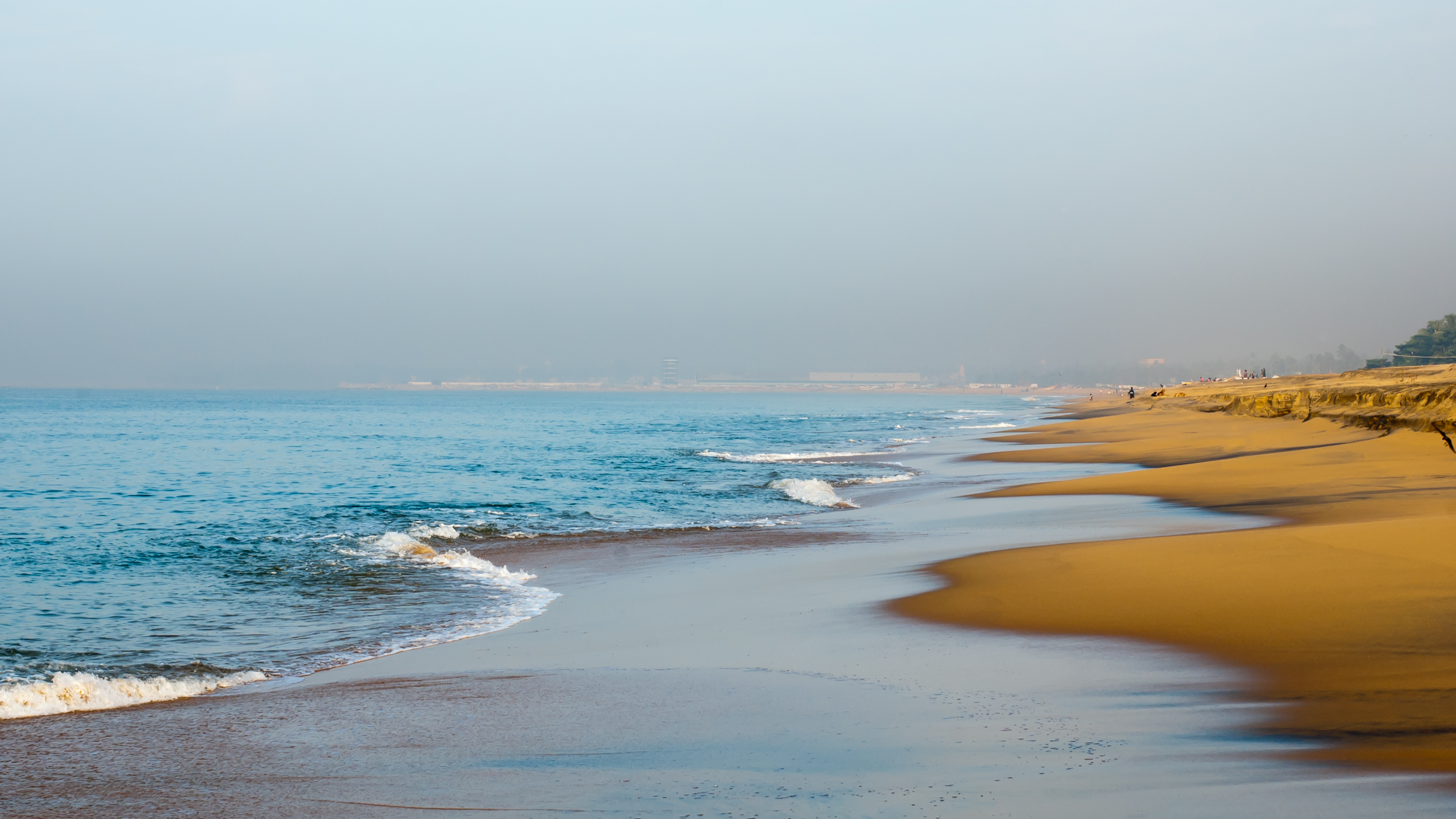
Kollam Beach

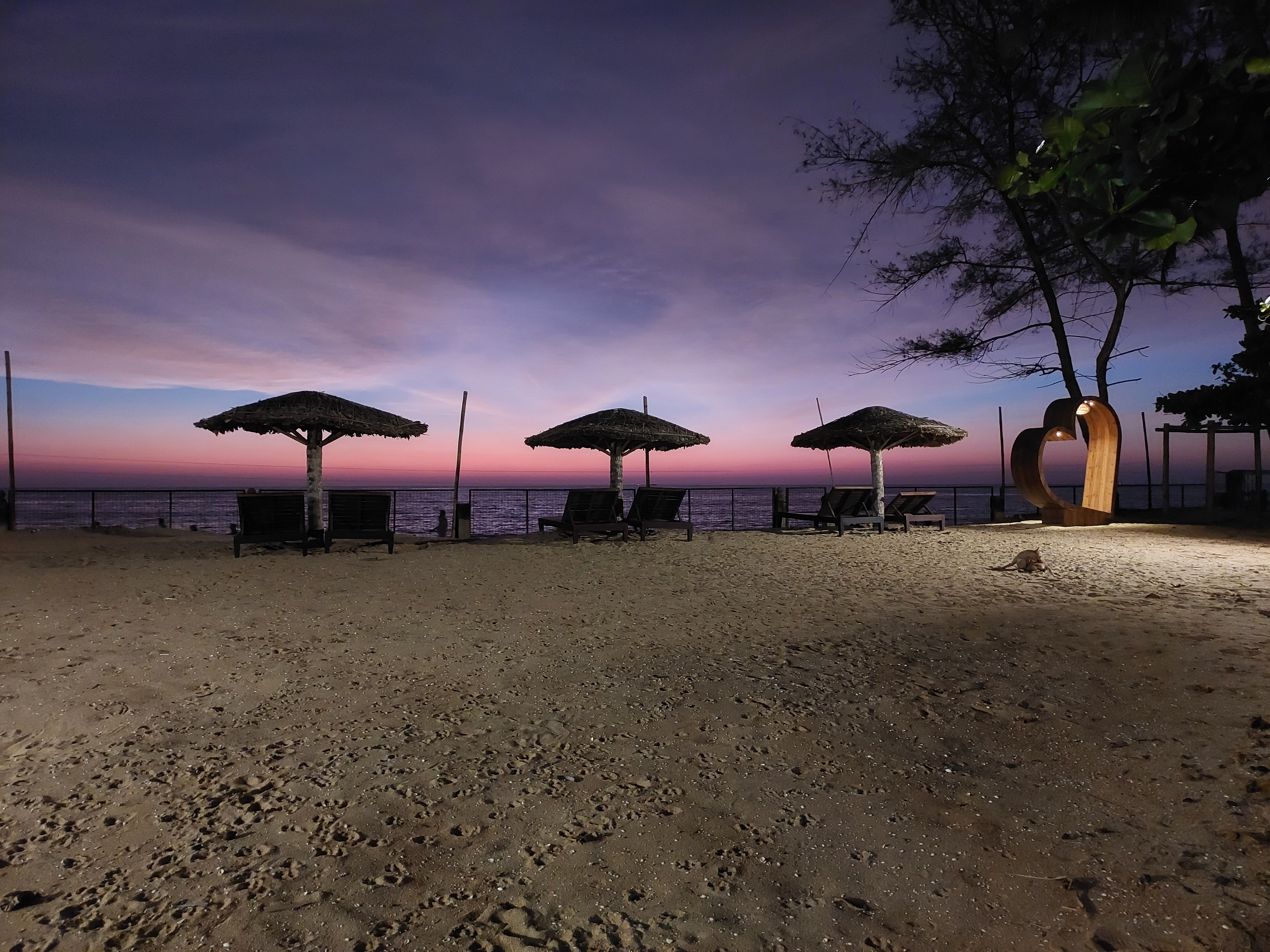
Cherai Beach

- Chavakkad Beach
- Cherai Beach
- Fort Kochi beach
- Kollam Beach
- Kanhangad Beach
- Marari beach
- Meenkunnu Beach
- Muzhappilangad Beach
- Payyambalam Beach
- Saddam Beach
- Shangumughom Beach
- Snehatheeram Beach
- Kappil Beach Varkala
- Thirumullavaram Beach
- Kovalam Beach
- Hawa Beach, Kovalam
- Samudra Beach, Kovalam
- Lighthouse Beach, Kovalam
- Kannur Beach
- Kappad Beach
- Varkala Beach / Papanasham Beach
- Padinjarekkara Beach
- Tanur Beach
- Azheekal Beach
- Alappuzha Beach
- Kozhikode Beach
- Bekal Beach
- Thiruvambadi Beach
- Kappil Beach

== East coast ==
The Indian East Coast starts with West Bengal and extends further through Odisha, Andhra Pradesh and finally ends in Tamil Nadu.

=== West Bengal ===
Beaches in West Bengal are:

- Henry Island Beach
- Bakkhali sea beach
- Frasergunj Sea Beach
- Gangasagar Sea Beach
- Junput beach
- Bankiput Sea Beach
- Mandarmani beach
- Shankarpur Beach
- Tajpur beach
- Digha Sea Beach
- Udaypur Sea Beach

=== Odisha ===
The beaches in Odisha are:

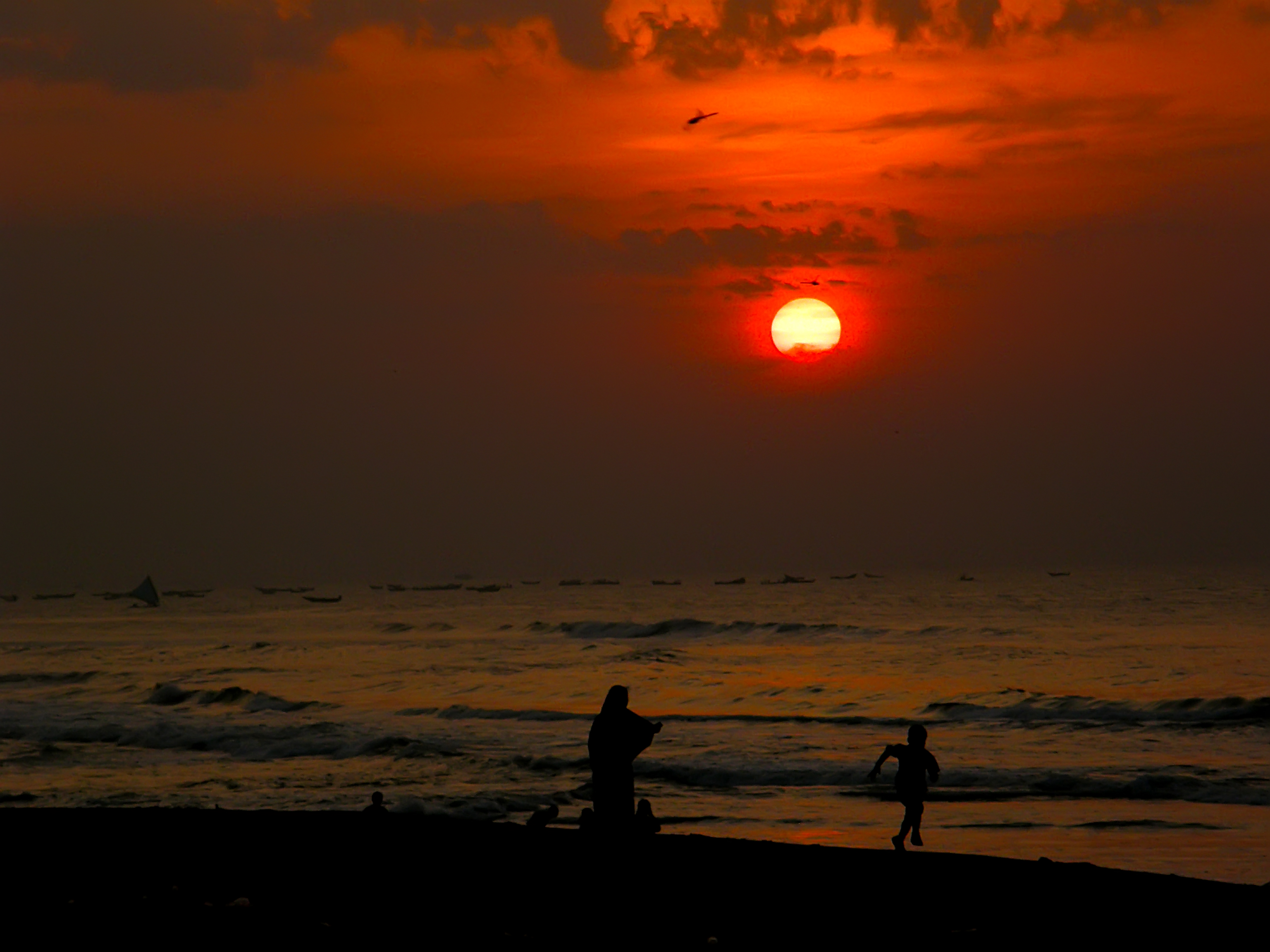
Puri Sea Beach at Sunrise

- Talsari Beach
- Dagara beach
- Chandipur-on-sea
- Gahirmatha Beach
- Satabhaya beach
- Pentha Sea Beach
- Hukitola beach
- Paradeep sea beach
- Astaranga beach
- Beleswar beach
- Konark Beach
- Chandrabhaga beach
- Ramachandi beach
- Puri Beach
- Satpada beach
- Parikud beach
- Ganjam beach
- Aryapalli beach
- Gopalpur-on-Sea
- Dhabaleshwar beach
- Ramayapatnam Beach
- Sonapur beach

=== Andhra Pradesh ===
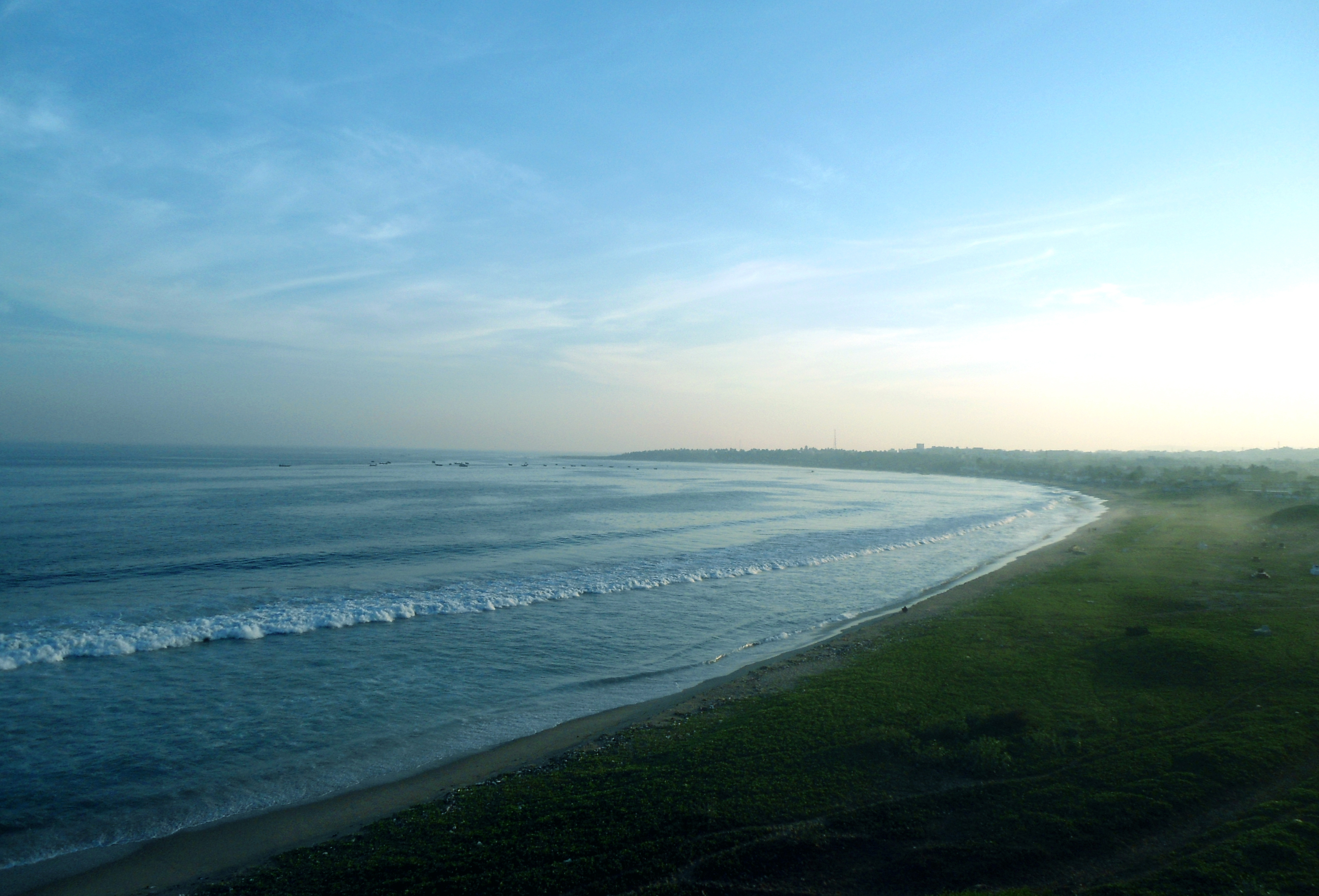
(Bay of Bengal) Beach view from Tenneti Park, Visakhapatnam, Andhra Pradesh

The following are the beaches in Andhra Pradesh, India.

- Sonpur Beach
- Donkuru Beach
- Nelavanka Beach
- Kaviti Beach
- Onturu Beach
- Ramayyapatnam Beach
- Baruva Beach
- Battigalluru Beach
- Sirmamidi Beach
- Ratti Beach
- Shivasagar Beach
- Dokulapadu Beach
- Nuvvalarevu Beach
- KR Peta Beach
- Bavanapadu Beach
- Mula Peta Beach
- BVS Beach
- Patha Meghavaram Beach
- Guppidipeta Beach
- Kotharevu Beach
- Rajaram Puram Beach
- Kalingapatnam Beach
- Bandaruvanipeta Beach
- Mogadalapadu Beach
- Vatsavalasa Beach
- S. Matchelesam Beach
- Balarampuram Beach
- Kunduvanipeta Beach
- PD Palem Beach
- Budagatlapalem Beach
- Kotcherla Beach
- Jeerupalem Beach
- Kovvada Beach
- Pothayyapeta Beach
- Chintapalli NGF Beach
- Chintapalli Beach
- Tammayyapalem Beach
- Konada Beach
- Divis Beach
- Bheemili Beach
- Mangamaripeta Beach
- Thotlakonda Beach
- Rushikonda Beach
- Sagarnagar Beach
- Jodugullapalem Beach
- RK Beach
- Durga Beach
- Yarada Beach
- Gagavaram Beach
- Adi's Beach
- Appikonda Beach
- Tikkavanipalem Beach
- Mutyalammapalem Beach
- Thanthadi Beach
- Seethapalem Beach
- Rambilli Beach
- Kothapatnam Beach
- Revupolavaram Beach
- Gudivada Beach
- Gurrajupeta Beach
- Pedhatheenarla Beach
- Rajjyapeta Beach
- Boyapadu Beach
- DLPuram Beach
- Pentakota Beach
- Rajavaram Beach
- Addaripeta Beach
- Danvaipeta Beach
- Gaddipeta Beach
- K. Perumallapuram Beach
- Konapapapeta Beach
- Uppada Beach
- Nemam Beach
- NTR Beach
- Seahorse Beach
- Dragonmouth Beach
- Pallam Beach
- Sunrise Beach
- Surasani Yanam Beach
- Vasalatippa Beach
- Odalarevu Beach
- Turpupalem Beach
- Kesanapalli Beach
- Shankaraguptham Beach
- Chintalamori Beach
- Natural Beach
- KDP Beach
- Antervedi Beach
- Pedamainavanilanka Beach
- Perupalem Beach
- Kanakadurga Beach
- Gollapalem Beach
- Podu Beach
- Gollapalem Beach
- Pedapatnam Beach
- Modi Beach
- Tallapalem Beach
- Manginapudi Beach
- Crab Beach
- Gopuvanipalem Beach
- Lonely Beach
- Chinakaragraharam Beach
- Destiny Beach
- Machilipatnam Beach
- Hamsaladeevi Beach
- Diviseema Beach
- Dindi Beach
- Nizampatnam Beach
- Suryalanka Beach
- Pandurangapuram Beach
- Vodarevu Beach
- Ramachandrapuram Beach
- Motupalli Beach
- Chinaganjam Beach
- Pedaganjam Beach
- Kanapurthi Beach
- Kodurivaripalem Beach
- Katamvaripalem Beach
- Kanuparthi Beach
- Motumala Beach
- Pinnivaripalem Beach
- Kothapatnam Beach
- Gavandlapallem Beach
- Rajupalem Beach
- Etthamukhala Beach
- Madanur Beach
- White sand Beach
- Pakka Beach
- Pakala Beach
- Ullapalem Beach
- Pedda Pallepalem Beach
- Karedu Beach
- G-Star Shiv Beach
- Shiv satendra Prajapati Beach
- Alagayapalem Beach
- Chackicherla Beach
- Ramayapattanam Public Beach
- Karla palem Beach
- SSR Port Beach
- Pallipalem Public Beach
- Kotha sathram Beach
- Pedaramudu palem Beach
- Chinnaramudu palem Beach
- Thummalapenta Beach
- Thatichetla Palem Beach
- LN Puram Beach
- Iskapalli Beach
- Ponnapudi Beach
- Ramathirdamu Beach
- Govundlapalem Beach
- Kudithipalem Beach
- Gangapatnam Beach
- Mypadu Beach
- Zard Beach
- Kotha Koduru Beach
- Koduru Beach
- Katepalli Beach
- Nelaturu Beach
- Krishnapatnam Beach
- Theegapalem Beach
- Srinivasa satram Beach
- Pattapupalem Beach
- Moonside Beach
- Thupilipalem Beach
- Kondurpalem Beach
- Alone Beach
- Raviguntapalem Beach
- Nawabpet Beach

=== Tamil Nadu ===
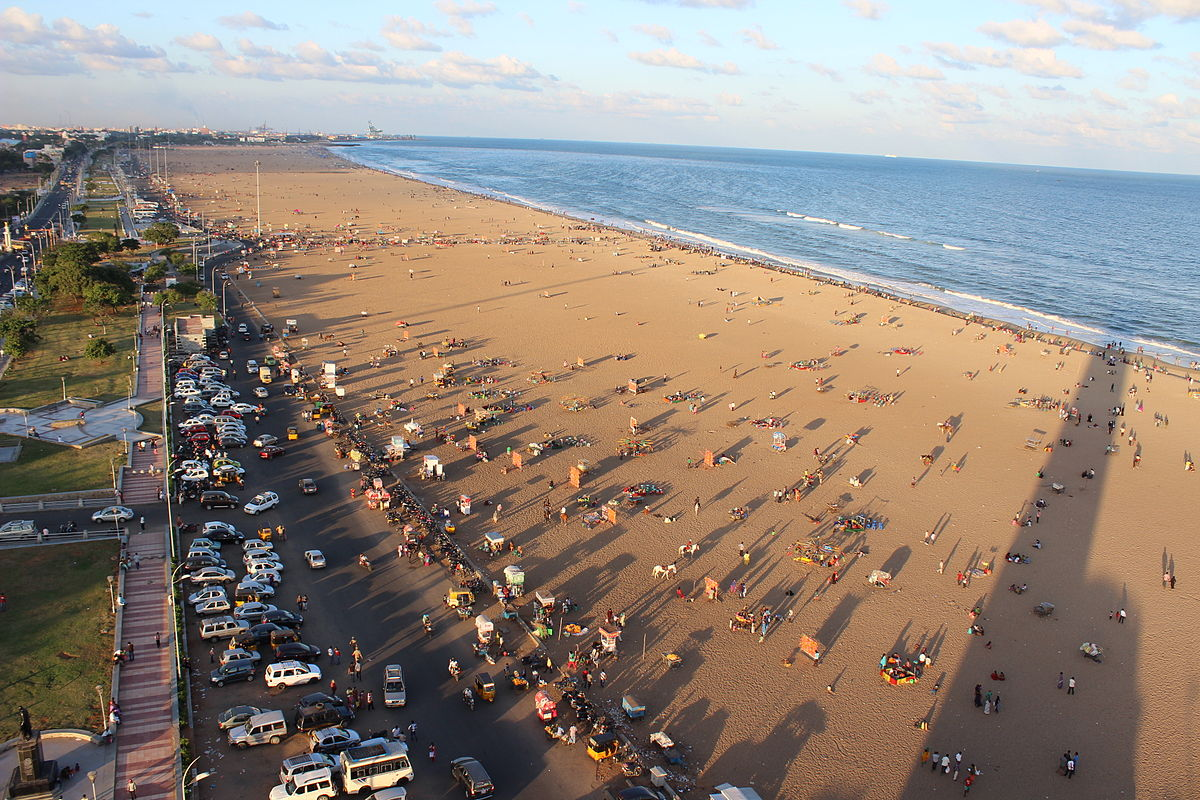
A view of the Marina Beach, Chennai, Tamil Nadu - The longest beach in India and World's second longest Sandy Urban beach

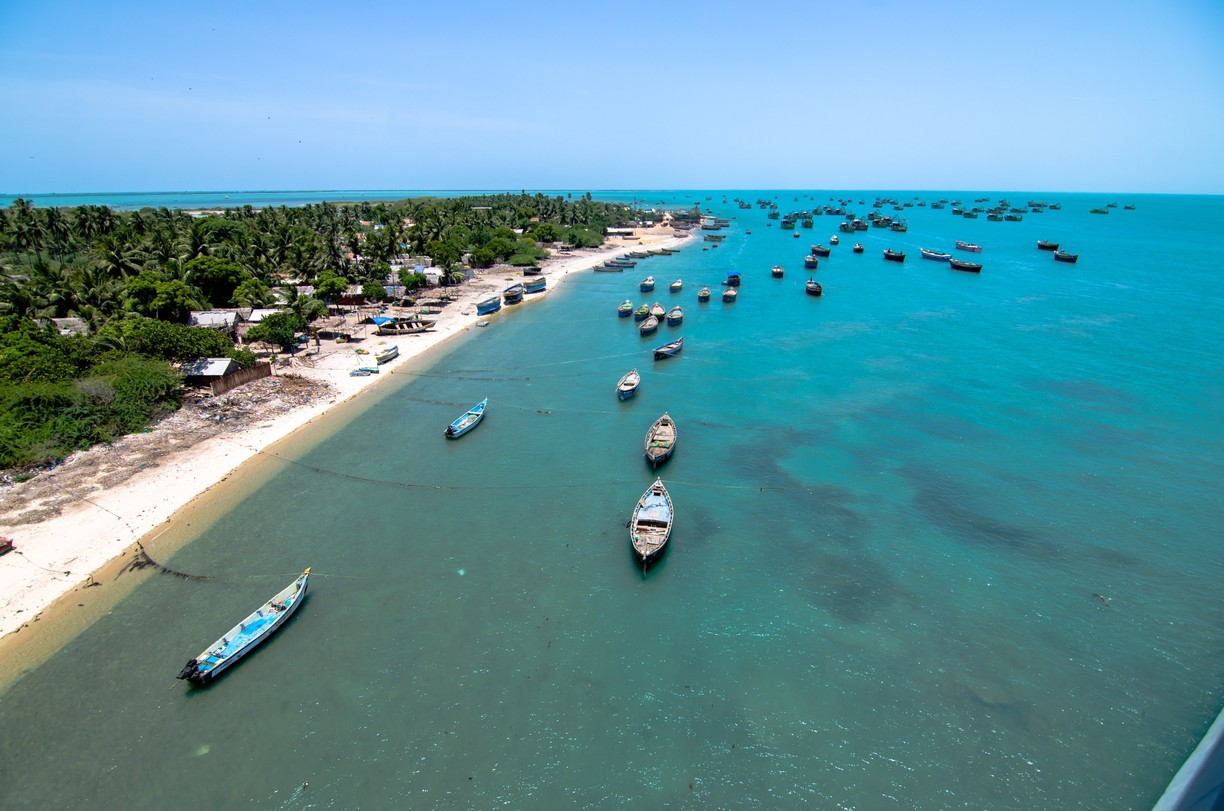
View of Pamban Beach, Rameswaram

The beaches in the southern state of Tamil Nadu are:

- Marina Beach
- Edward Elliot's Beach
- Kasimedu's N4 Beach
- Golden Beach, Chennai
- Thiruvanmayur Beach, Chennai
- Silver Beach
- Covelong Beach
- Mahabalipuram Beach
- Olaikuda Beach
- Ariyaman/kushi Beach, Rameswaram
- Pamban Beach, Rameswaram
- Dhanushkodi Beach
- Velankanni Beach
- Sothavilai Beach
- Kanyakumari Beach
- Vattakotai Beach
- Sanguthurai Beach
- Sengumal Beach
- Thoothukudi Beach
- Tiruchendur Beach
- Poompuhar Beach

=== Pondicherry ===
- Promenade Beach
- Karaikal Beach
- Yanam Beach
- Auroville Beach
- Paradise Beach
- Serenity Beach

== Island Territories ==
=== Andaman and Nicobar Islands ===
- Radhanagar Beach, Andaman and Nicobar Islands
- Bangaram beach, Lakshadweep Islands
- Kala Patthar Beach, Andaman and Nicobar Islands
- Elephant Beach, Andaman and Nicobar Islands
- Wandoor Beach, Andaman and Nicobar Islands

=== Lakshadweep ===
- List of islands in Lakshadweep

== See also ==
- Coastal India
  - Coral reefs in India
  - Fishing in India
  - List of islands in Lakshadweep
  - List of islands in India
- List of beaches
- Tourism in India
