= Coastline of Andhra Pradesh =

The coastline of Andhra Pradesh is located on the southeastern coast of the Indian Peninsula in the Bay of Bengal and is part of the Northern Circars. With a length of 1053 km (640 mi), it has the third longest coastline in India after Gujarat and Tamil Nadu. The coastal corridor boasts several ports, harbors, vast stretches of sandy beaches, wildlife and bird sanctuaries, as well as fresh water lakes and estuaries.

Andhra Pradesh coastal corridor

== Geography ==
The coast extends from Ichchapuram in Srikakulam district to Tirupati district and lies geographically between the coasts of Orissa and Tamil Nadu. Coastal wetlands cover an area of 1,140.7 km^{2} (440.4 mi^{2}).

== List of coastal districts ==
Andhra Pradesh has a total of 12 districts that are situated along its coastline. Among these districts, 4 in the Uttara Andhra region, 7 are located in the Kostha Andhra region, and 1 in the Rayalaseema region. The list of these districts is as follows:

- Uttara Andhra
  - Srikakulam
  - Vizianagaram
  - Vishakhapatnam
  - Anakapalli
- Kostha Andhra
  - Kakinada
  - Dr B. R. Ambedkar Konaseema
  - West Godavari
  - Krishna
  - Bapatla
  - Prakasam
  - Sri Potti Sriramulu Nellore
- Rayalaseema
  - Tirupati

== Economy ==
=== Tourism ===
These district's has beaches to promote tourism in the state, such as Bheemili Beach, Rushikonda Beach, Bhavanapadu Beach, Ramakrishna Mission Beach, Yarada Beach, Vodarevu Beach, Suryalanka Beach, and Narsapur. Visakhapatnam district, in particular, is home to many beaches.

=== Fishing and aquaculture ===
Farmers in coastal areas predominantly engage in fishery, aquaculture, mollusc, and shrimp production as their primary occupations. The geographical location of the state allows for both marine fishing and inland fish production, which is often more profitable than traditional agriculture due to the cultivation of fresh water and brackish water aquaculture.

== Mineral deposits ==
The coastal corridor of Andhra Pradesh is rich in minerals such as beach sand, heavy mineral deposits like ilmenite, leucoxene, and monazite. An estimated 241 million tonnes of mineral reserves are present in the beach sand along the state coast.

Silica sand reserves are found in the coastal areas of Prakasam, Nellore, and Guntur districts, and are used for various purposes such as moulding sand, sodium silicate, ceramic, and glass production. Quartzites are found in Orvakal of Kurnool district.

== Sea trade ==
During the medieval period, the British and the Dutch engaged in trade along the coast of India, with the Andhra Pradesh coast being one of their destinations. Evidence of this can be found in some coastal towns, such as Bheemunipatnam. The coastline is home to major, intermediate, and minor ports as well as fishing harbours for sea trade with other countries. Visakhapatnam Port is the largest port on the east coast, and there are several other ports located between Srikakulam district and Krishnapatnam Port in Nellore district.

== Tropical cyclonic effects ==
The Bay of Bengal is known for the frequent occurrence of severe cyclones, with 71 cyclones recorded in the coastal region during 1892-1997. Nellore district leads with 11 severe and 21 normal cyclones. Several factors, such as the lack of flood protection, irrigation systems, drains, and embankments, contribute to severe damage to property in the coastal zone.

== See also ==
- Northern Circars
