= Melam Suryanarayana =

Indian politician

Melam Suryanarayana (1946–1992) alias Pedda Shavukaru is one of the Senior leaders of Indian National Congress.

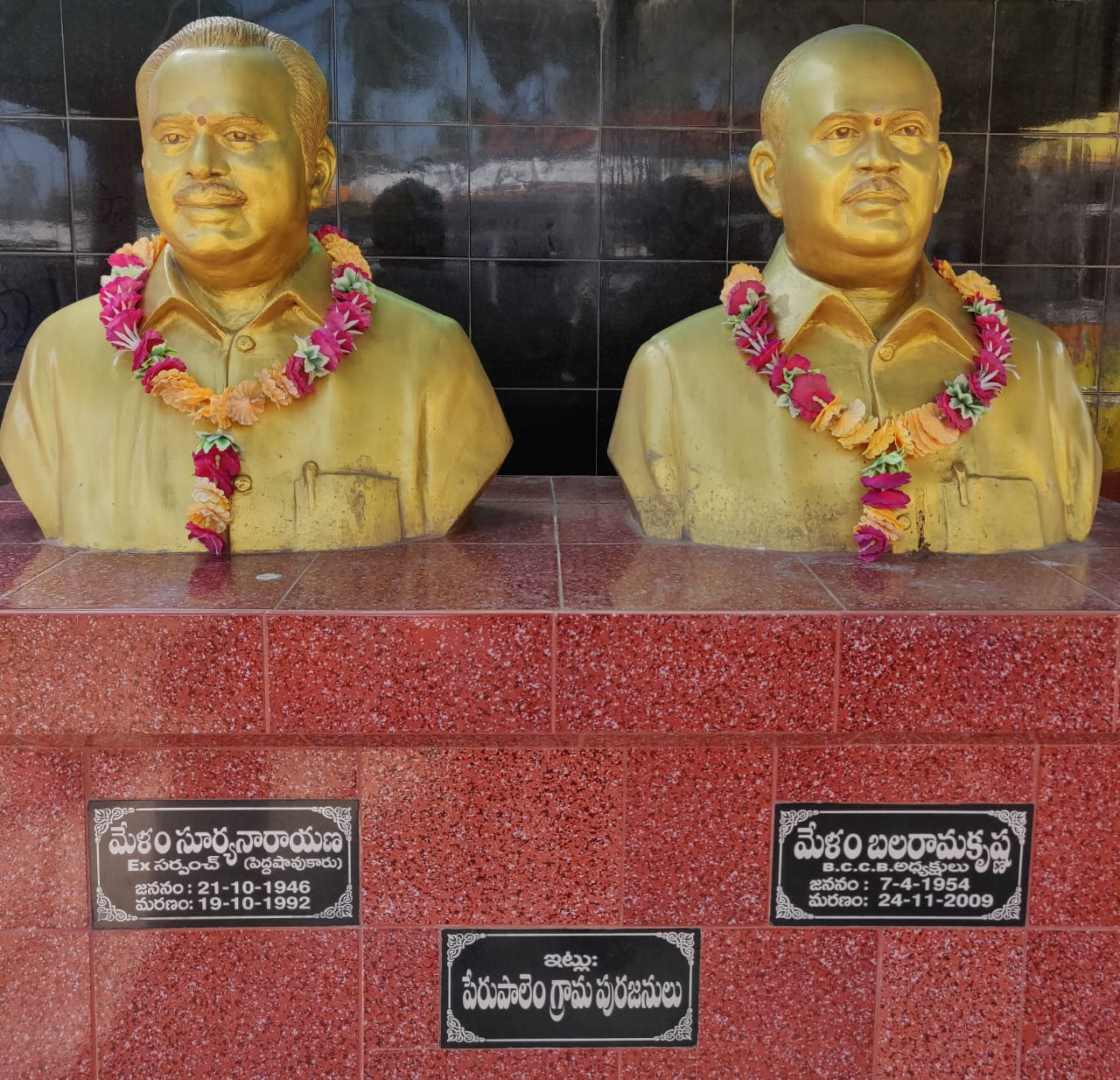
Statues of Melam Suryanarayana and Melam Balarama Krishna

== Political life ==
Melam Suryanarayana first served as the Sarpanch of Perupalem. Later competed for Narasapur legislative assembly constituency in 1985, lost the election to Chegondi Venkata Harirama Jogaiah securing 28,358 votes(31.46%).

== Legacy ==
- After the death of Melam Suryanarayana in 19-10-1992, two statues were erected in the village, one life size and other half size.
- After the death of his brother Melam Balaramkrishna in 24-11-2009, the half size statues of Melam Balaramakrishna and Melam Suryanarayana were Erected and another statue of Melam Balaramakrishna was erected near the Durgamma temple of the Village.
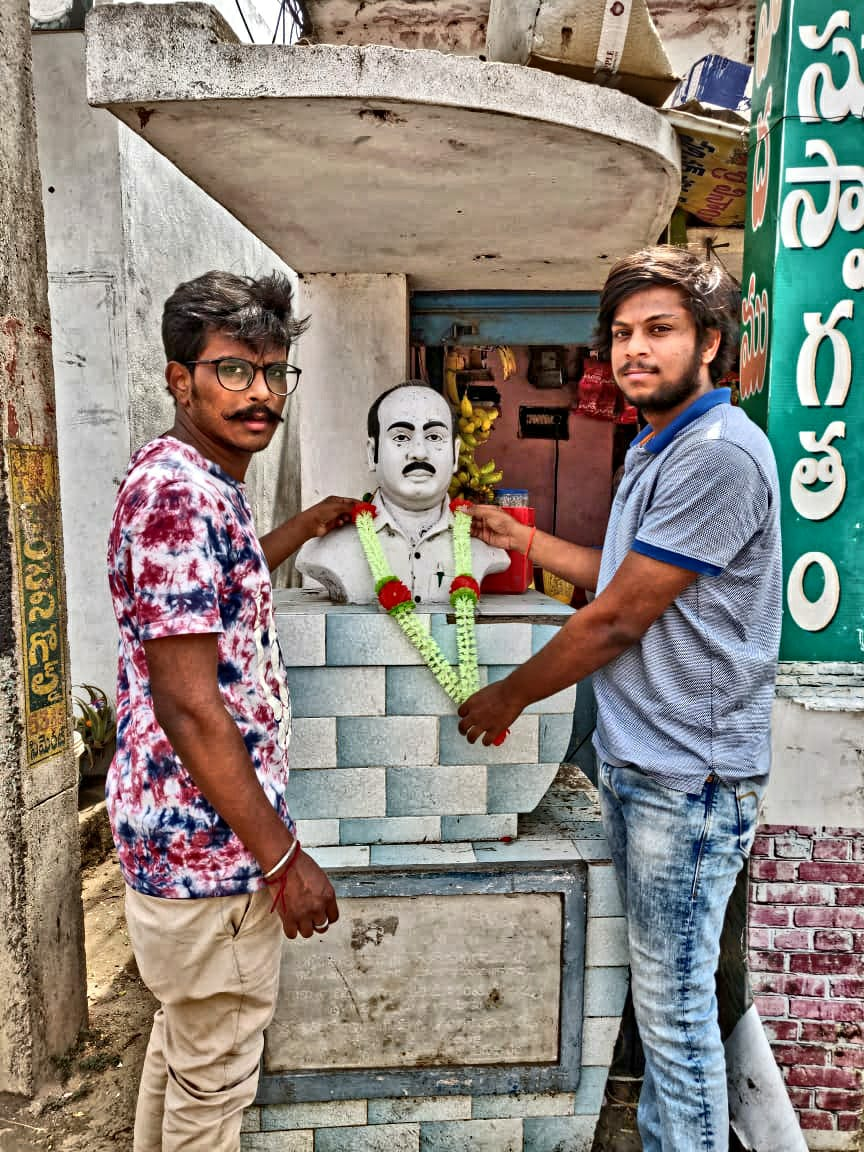
Half size statue of Melam Suryanarayana

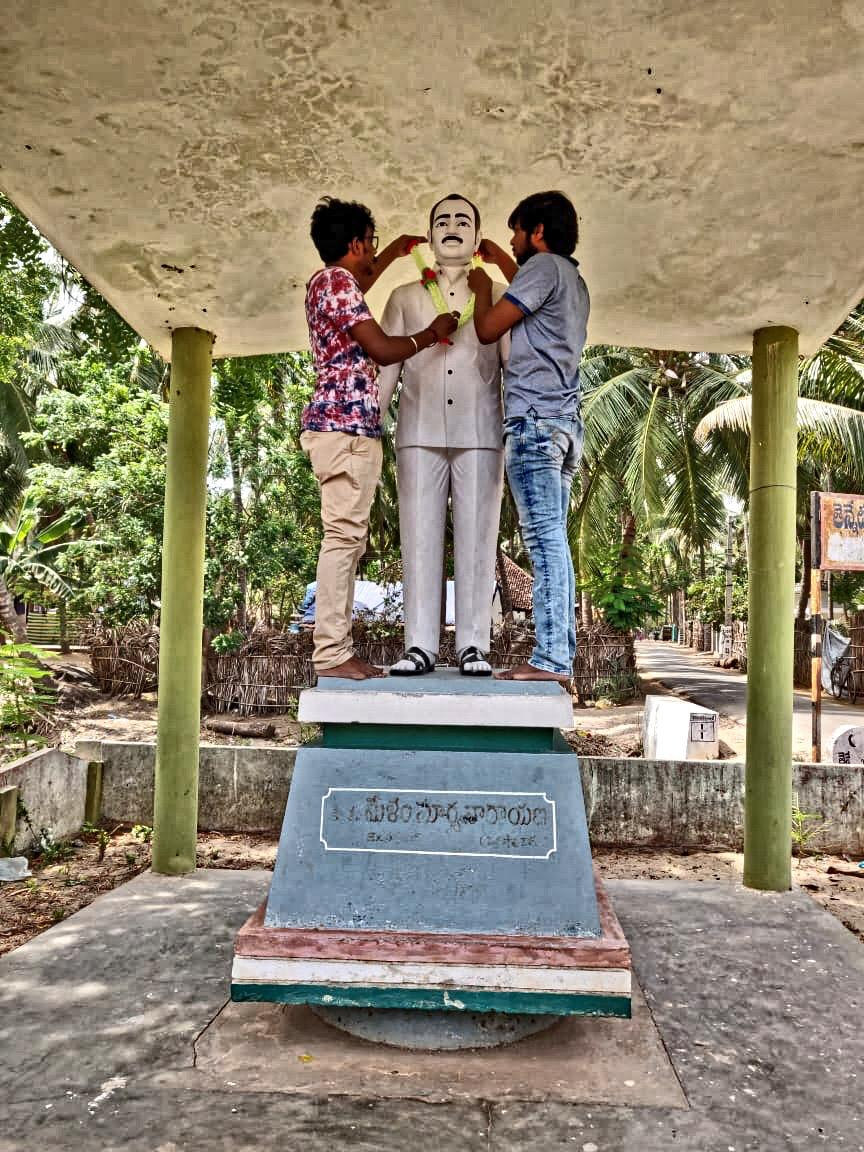
Life size statue of Melam Suryanarayana.

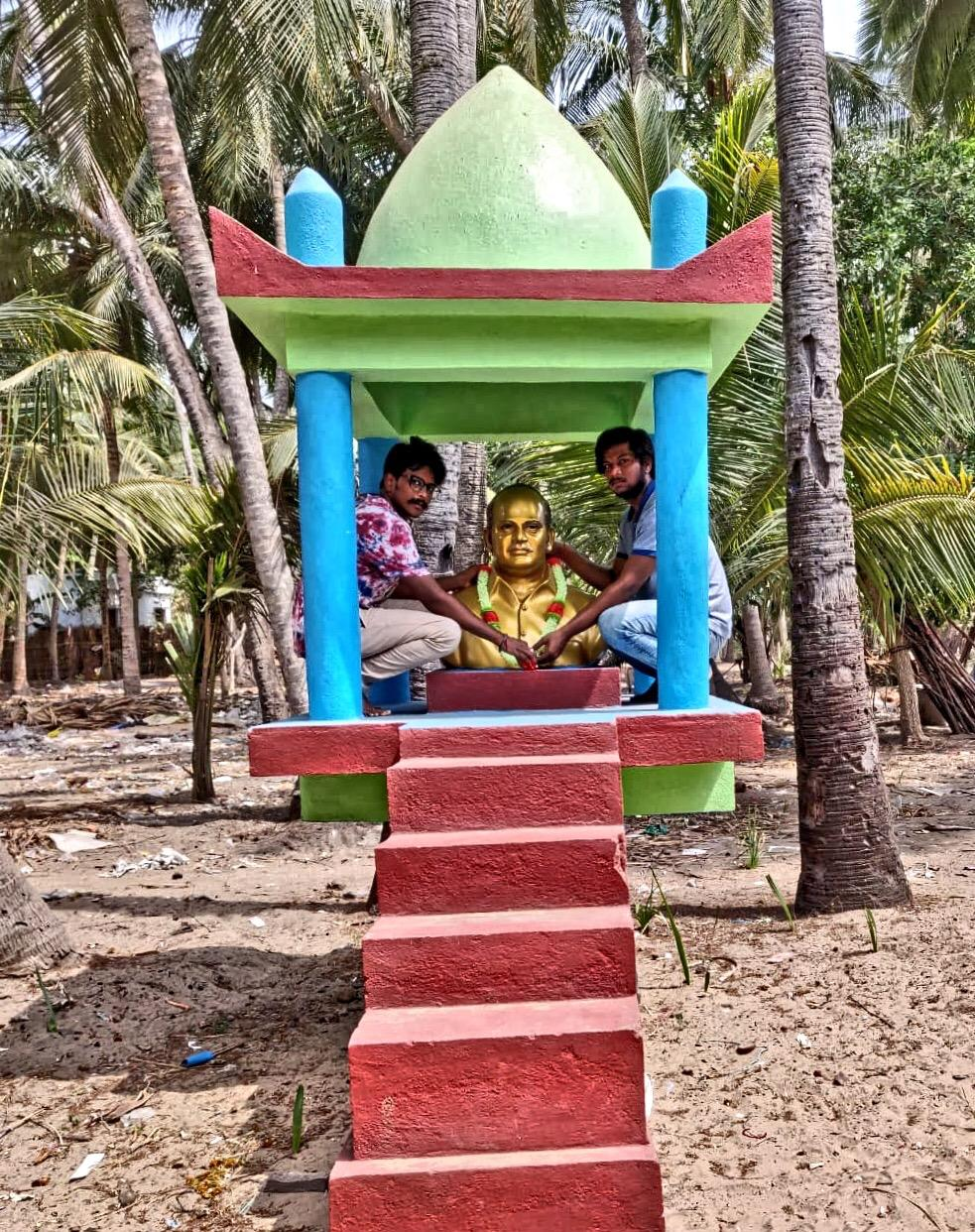
Half size statue of Melam Balarama Krishna
