= Percale =

Closely woven plain-weave fabric

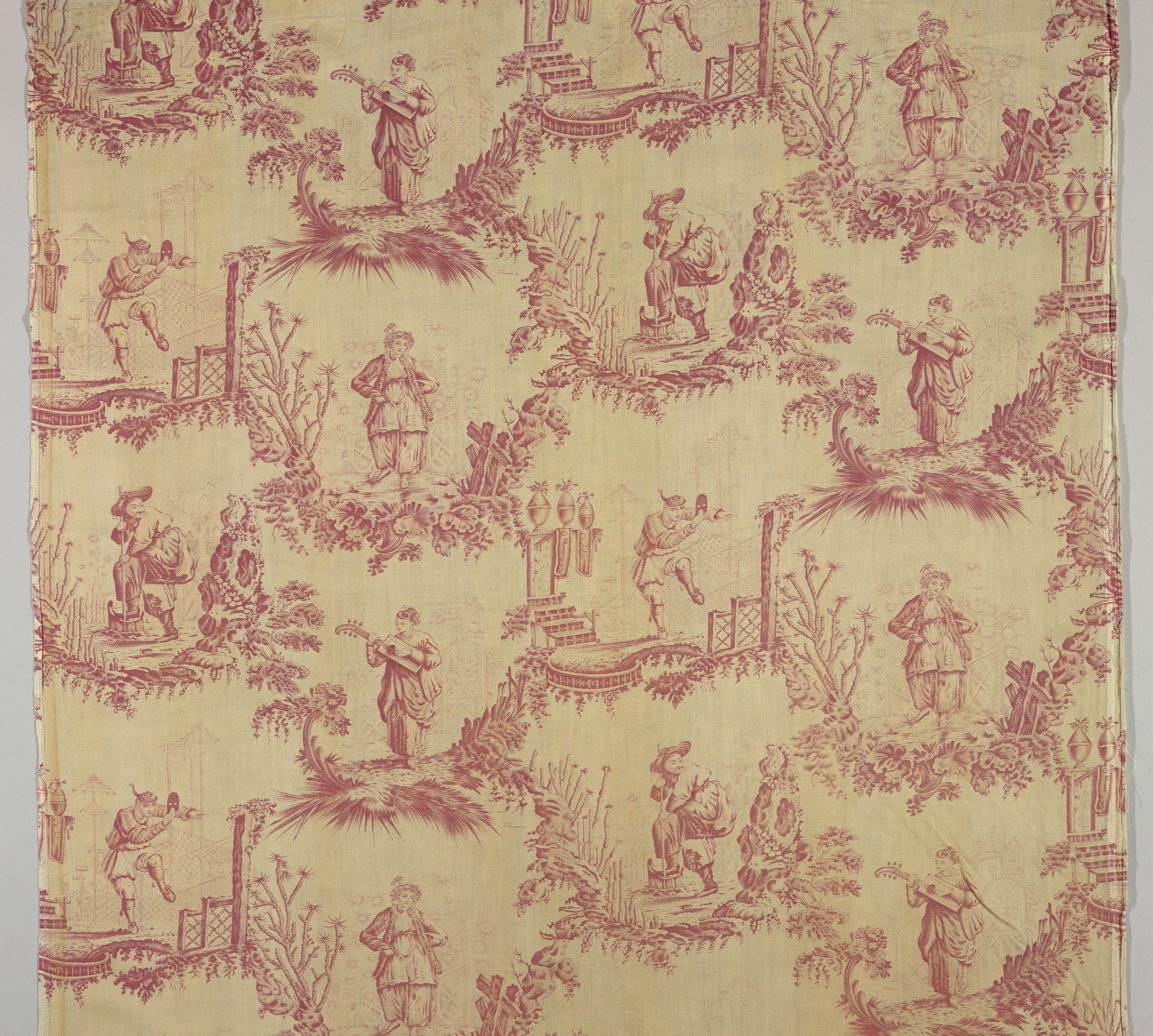
"Chinoiserie" (19th century). Four designs framed by plant forms in raspberry on an off-white percale.

Percale is a closely woven plain-weave fabric often used for bed covers. Percale has a thread count of about 180 or higher and is noticeably tighter than twill or sateen. It has medium weight, is firm and smooth with no gloss, and washes very well. It is made from both carded and combed yarns, and may be woven of various fibers, such as cotton, polyester, or various blends.

== History ==
Moris or mauris was the 18th-century French term used for percale, the cloth imported from India. It was a cotton cloth. Moris was the third most exported fabric from Coromandel Coast after Longcloth and Salampore. It was superior and finer quality than the peers. Coromandel coastline forms a part of Tamil Nadu and Andhra Pradesh. Moris was produced at Nellore, Arni, Maduranthakam, and Cuddalore. Palakollu. The cloth was famous as painted chintz in southeast countries also.

Percale was formerly imported from India in the 17th and 18th centuries, then manufactured in France.

== Etymology ==
The word may originate from the Persian: پرگاله : pargālah, meaning rag, although the Oxford English Dictionary (as of December 2005) has traced it only as far as 18th-century French. The dictionary of the Institut d'Estudis Catalans describes pexal and perxal as some kind of silk fabric in the year 1348 in Valencia. The etymological dictionary of Catalan explains perxal as derived from Perche in France.

== See also ==
- Silk
