= Uppada Jamdani sari =

Uppada Jamdani saree
- Geographical indication
- Alternative names: Handcrafted woven sari in Uppada Jamdani style
- Type: Handicraft
- Area: Uppada,& Tatiparthi, Kakinada district, Andhra Pradesh
- Country: India
- Material: Silk

Uppada Jamdani saree (or sari) is a silk sari style woven in Uppada of Kakinada district in the Indian state of Andhra Pradesh. It was registered as one of the geographical indication from Andhra Pradesh by Geographical Indications of Goods (Registration and Protection) Act, 1999. Uppada Jamdani saris are known for their light weight.

== Etymology ==
The name Jamdani in the Uppada Jamdani sari is a Persian terminology, in which Jam means flower and Dani means Vase.

== History ==
Jamdani style of weaving is originated in Bangladesh. In the 18th century, it was brought to south and in Uppada village of Kakinada district, Andhra Pradesh, India Jamdani style of weaving recreated with a local resonance. The Jamdani style weaving was as old as 300 years. In 1972, Uppada weavers were recognized by Govt. of India with President's award.

== Fabric of Uppada Jamdani saree ==
The Uppada Jamdani saree is a beautiful textile that has been weaved in [South India] for centuries. The fabric has a silk-like texture and is lightweight, making it perfect for designing sarees, gowns, scarves, etc. The history behind the Uppada fabric can be traced back to the Jamdani weaving technique developed in Eastern part of the Bengal, the modern day Bangladesh.

== Weave ==
Uppada Jamdani saree weaving takes nearly 10–60 days time for which at least 2–3 weavers has to spend 10 hours of their day. Weavers uses pure lace (silver zari often dipped in melted gold) and also finest silk of Bengaluru area. Weaving of saree involves, laying out its design, interweaving silk threads, looming, etc., There are around 3000 looms producing Jamdani sarees in and around Uppada and kothapalli area.

== The sari ==
Around forty percent of the local weavers are women. To make a sari, it takes a week to a fortnight which consists of cotton body with silk pallu and all completely handwoven. The weavers design in such a way that it can be folded and fits in a matchbox. Different designs include geometric, flowers, leaves, etc. Speciality of Jamdani saree is that it gets design on both the sides and is much less weight than that of Kanchi and Dharmavaram brands.

== See also ==
- Jamdani
- Muslin trade in Bengal
- Ilkal saree
- Navalgund Durries
- Mysore silk
- List of Geographical Indications in India
