= Eden Beach Puducherry =

Beach in Puducherry, India

Eden Beach
- Coastal
- Interactive map of Eden Beach
- Coordinates: 11.8747°N 79.8157°E
- Location: Chinna Veerampattinam, Puducherry, India

Dimensions
  - Length: 800 meters

Eden Beach is a beach located in Chinna Veerampattinam, Puducherry, India. It is one of the twelve Indian beaches certified with the Blue Flag award by the Foundation for Environment Education (FEE), Denmark. It is a white sound beach and surrounded by coconut groves.

== Location ==
Eden Beach is situated 10 km from Puducherry city, between Paradise Beach and the Arts & Crafts Village.

== See also ==
- Blue Flag beach
- Tourism in Puducherry
- List of beaches in India
