= Yanam Beach =

Indian beach

- Beach
- Coordinates: 16.4400°N 82.1500°E
- Location: Yanam, Pondicherry, India

Yanam Beach is situated on the coast of Yanam town, an Indian territory of Puducherry. The beach is located on the Godavari River, 9 kilometres (5.6 mi) from the Bay of Bengal.

== See also ==
- List of beaches in India
