= Uppada =

- Village
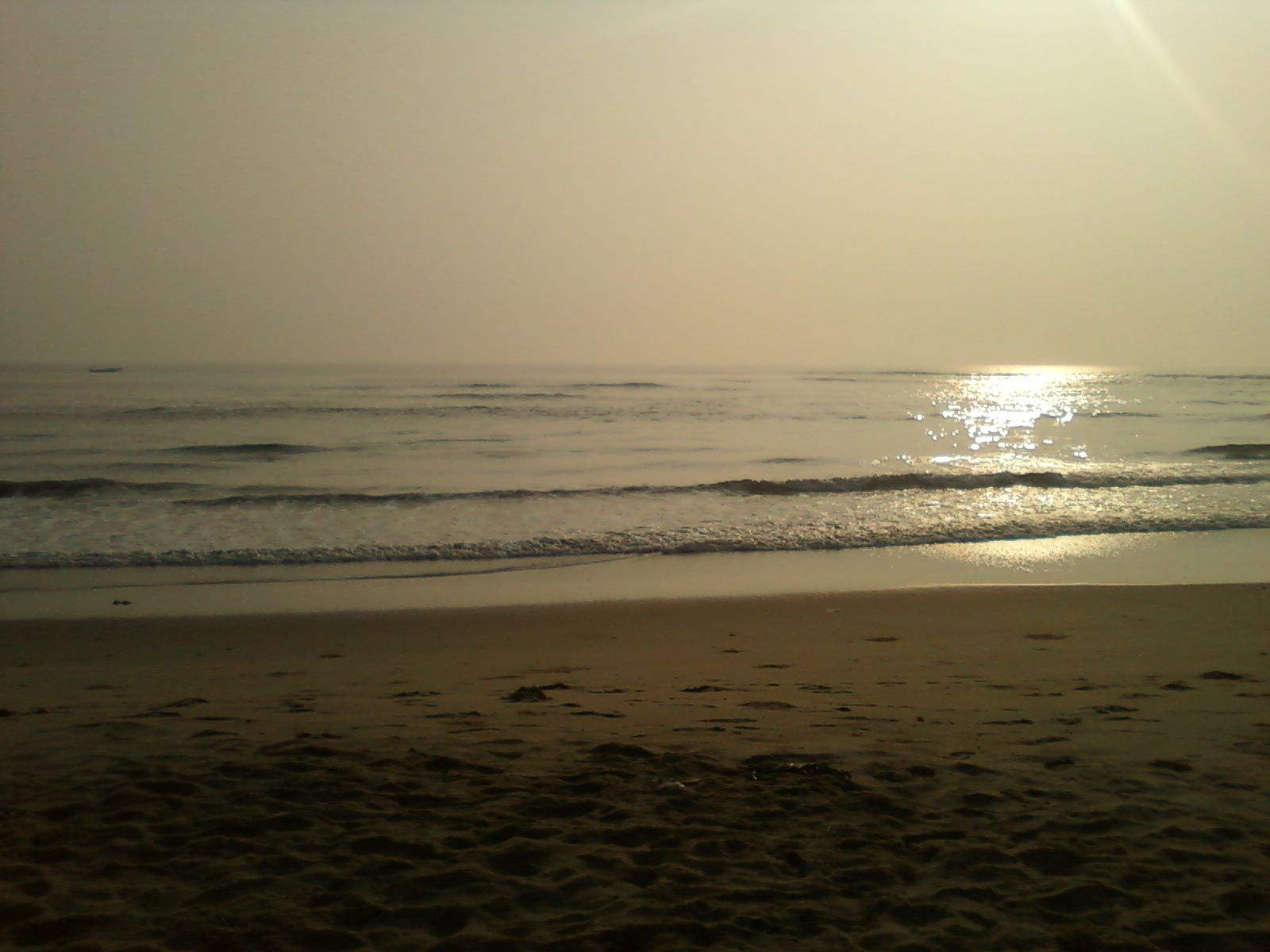
- Uppada beach
- Interactive map of Uppada
- Location in Andhra Pradesh, India Uppada (India)
- Coordinates: 17.0833°N 82.3333°E
- Country: India
- State: Andhra Pradesh
- District: Kakinada

Area
  - Total: 4.05 km^{2} (1.56 sq mi)
- Elevation: 15 m (49 ft)

Population (2011)
  - Total: 3,632
  - Density: 897/km^{2} (2,320/sq mi)

Languages
  - Official: Telugu
- Time zone: UTC+5:30 (IST)
- Climate: hot (Köppen)

Uppada is a village in Kakinada district of the Indian state of Andhra Pradesh. It is located in Kothapalli mandal of Kakinada revenue division. Uppada Jamdani Sari is a handcrafted sari woven at the village and is also a geographical indication of Andhra Pradesh. It is popular Fishery station for Prawns.

== Geography ==
Uppada is situated at 17.0883°N 82.3333°E and at an altitude of 15 m (49 ft). 45 km from Tuni The village is spread over an area of 4.50 km^{2} (1.74 sq mi) and is located on the west coast of Bay of Bengal.

== History ==
Uppada is a place filled with fishing nets and sea waves. Uppada is the trace of silver lace in the exquisite handloom saree. Uppada is the silent womb of the Kadali that hides many historical facts. Uppada has written its name in history with great pride since the days when Shaivism was very popular in India. Veera Natyam is a folk art form of Shaivism. The people who greatly appreciated this dance were the Devangs. Since ancient times, the Devangs have lived in the vicinity of Uppada in large numbers. The Devangs, who are skilled in the field of handloom weaving, are the leaders of the Shaivite religion. Even today, it is customary to invite the sons of the heroes and hold Veera Natyam in their homes for auspicious occasions. In the Purana epic, the Veera Natyam belongs to the hero Veerabhadra who went to kill Daksha. Being very ancient, it tells us about the antiquity of the gods. The Shiva Linga, which is said to have emerged from the depths of the Uppada sea recently, and the stone in the form of Vinayaka, which is said to have been washed away, show the importance of Shaivism in Uppada. Elders say that five to six villages of the ancient Uppada villages merged into the sea. The writer saw the Uppada village merging into the sea 25 years ago. Once upon a time, the Shiva temple, which had been worshipped and had been ruined, stood in the lap of Kadali for many years, entertaining the devotees, as if in silence! It is a bit surprising that the Shiva Linga form, which reached the shore from the new net of the Gangaputras, was brought to spiritual shores with awe and amazement. There is much evidence that Shaivism was at its peak in Uppada. The temple on the seashore of Uppada, which we see today in the form of Bhramarambika Malleswara Swamy, the consort of Sati, was developed by the famous Sannidhi royal family over five hundred years. It merged with the seabed and is worshipped in a newly built temple at Moolavirattu. There is historical evidence that Sri Sannidhi Raja Jaggaraju, a poet from the Sannidhi Raja dynasty, lived in Uppada between the 16th and 17th centuries. Jaggaraju wrote a Kuravanji (street play) called "Chogadi Kalapam" (probably the story of Bhaktakannappa) with an account of Shiva, which gave Uppada a place in Andhra Telugu literature. Kuravanji was a street play that was widely performed from the 15th to the 17th century. It became a Yakshaganam in the 18th and 19th centuries. Kuravanji is the oldest street play that is seen today in the form of Kalapam. There is no doubt that Jaggakavi, who also wrote the Vedanta Kuravanji called “Jiva Erukala Kuravanji”, immortalized the importance of Shaivism in Uppada in history. Literary scholars say that the great poet Srinath took a bath in the sea in Uppada in the early years of the 15th century. Despite his ten years in our district, Srinath did not have the fortune of seeing the kings of Rajamahendrapur. Literary texts indicate that he stayed in Draksharamam with the company of the rulers of Bendapudi and visited the holy places before writing Bhima Khanda. After visiting the Maharaja of Pithapuram, he visited the Padagaya shrine in Pithapuram and took a bath in the Uppada sea. Such is the importance of the Uppada sea bath. The surrounding villages of Uppada have a history of thousands of years and greet us. Ponnada village, which is considered Uppada, was known as "Ponnada Shehar" during the rule of the Muslims a thousand years ago. As a sign of this, the villages around Uppada have Muslim names. Aminabad, Amar Valli (Amaravalli), Mehdipatnam (Maya Patnam). A famous Muslim sister "Bashir Bibi" lived in Ponnada. She used to lend her gold to those who asked her and help them in their difficulties. Bashir Bibi, who was fascinated by the beauty of Delhi, attacked Ponnada and wanted to capture her. Bashir Bibi, who was of great beauty, cursed the building in which she lived to sink into the ground and became a living tomb. This is a historical story that is on the tongues of the people. It is said that the Uppada Sea immediately erupted like a tsunami and drowned the Delhi Padusha armies, which is why sand dunes are still visible around the Bashir Bhibhi Temple. Even today, the top floor of the building greets us like a mosque and surprises us. The Bashir Bhibhi Temple is worshipped by people of all castes and religions. It is a tradition for not only Muslim brothers from all over the country, but also Hindu brothers from the surrounding areas to offer turmeric and saffron to the girls and boys in their homes for good luck. The battle of Kondavaram or Chandurthi, which took place in 1758 in the village of Kondavaram in Uppada, is recorded in history as the first Indian war. The great battle fought between the French and the kings of Peddapuram on one side and the English and the kings of Vijayanagaram on the other side, is called the Chendurthi Maha Yuddha. By then, this Kondavaram village and Chandurthi village were under the rule of the Pithapuram Maharajas. From that time onwards, the Pithapuram kings began to come into the limelight. When the daughter of the Bobbili kings married the Pithapuram king, the descendants of Rao settled in the surrounding areas of Uppada Kothapalli and built temples in many villages like Uppada Kothapalli and Gorsa and continued as trustees and became saints. It is noteworthy that Uppada village, which has great historical importance, has occasionally revealed its traces amidst the waves of centuries.

== See also ==
- Uppada Beach
