= Ramayapatnam Beach =

Beach in Andhra Pradesh, India

- Beach
- Location within Andhra Pradesh
- Coordinates: 16.3404314°N 81.6017932°E
- Location: Ramayapatnam, Prakasam district, Andhra Pradesh, India

Ramayapatnam Beach is located on the coast of Bay of Bengal, in Prakasam district of the Indian state of Andhra Pradesh. The beach is being developed for tourism by the state tourism board, APTDC.

== See also ==
- List of beaches in India
