= Jampore Beach =

Beach in Daman, India

- Natural beach
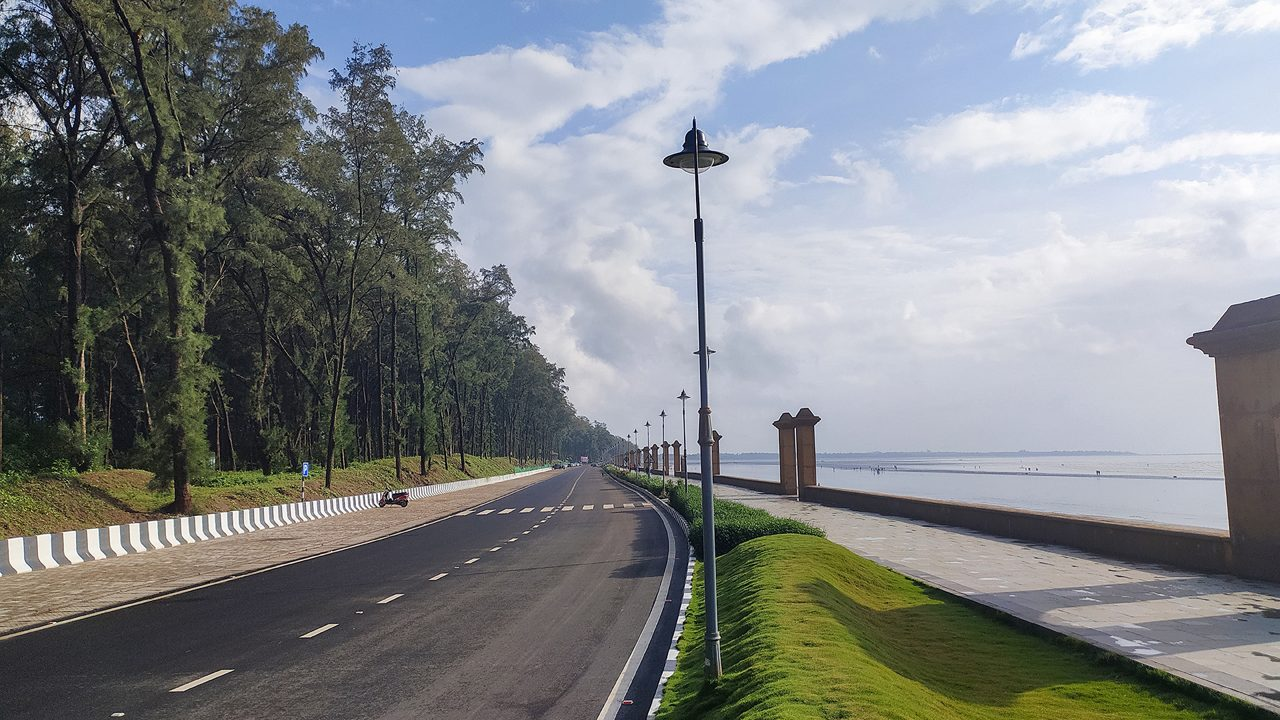
- Interactive map of Jampore Beach
- Coordinates: 20.3970°N 72.8320°E
- Location: Daman, India

Dimensions
  - Length: Approx. 5 km

Jampore Beach is a beach located in Daman in the union territory of Dadra and Nagar Haveli and Daman and Diu, India. It is situated along the coast of Gujarat in the Arabian Sea about 4 km from Moti Daman. It is relatively secluded and has calm waters, blackish-brown sand, and scenic sunset views.

== Tourism ==
The Tourism department has developed it as a tourist attractions with activities like camel and horse rides and parasailing. Jampore beach is connected by road and the nearest railway station is Vapi railway station, about 12 km away in Gujarat. The nearest airports are Surat Airport (90 km) and Mumbai (170 km).

In June 2024, the Daman district administration banned tourists to the beach for a month till August end as a safety precaution. But within two day, it was reported that two men drowned. The beach was in the news earlier in February 2022, a 20-year-old woman and four girls drowned in a creek near the beach and in May 2022, three people were injured during parasailing at the beach.

== See also ==
- Daman, India
- List of beaches in India
