= Suryalanka Beach =

Beach in Andhra Pradesh, India

Coordinates: 15.83454°N 80.50507°E

Suryalanka Beach or Bapatla Beach is a beach in Bapatla district of the Indian state of Andhra Pradesh. It is located approximately 9 kilometers from Bapatla Bhavanarayana Swamy Temple and 50 miles south of Guntur City. It is located in the Bay of Bengal. The place has many resorts close to the beach.

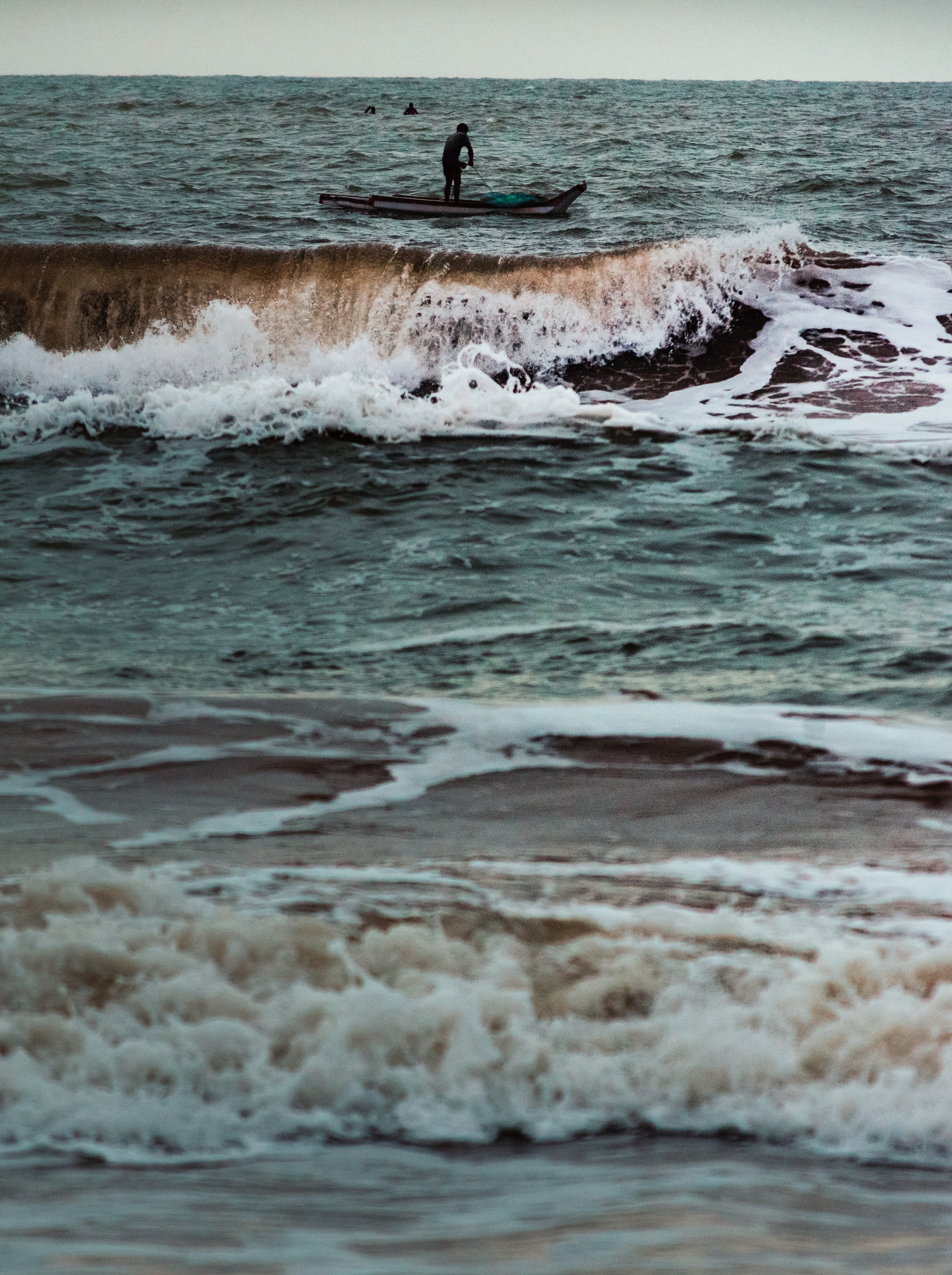
Suryalanka Beach

== See also ==
- List of beaches in India
