= Bheemili Beach =

Beach in Andhra Pradesh, India

- Beach
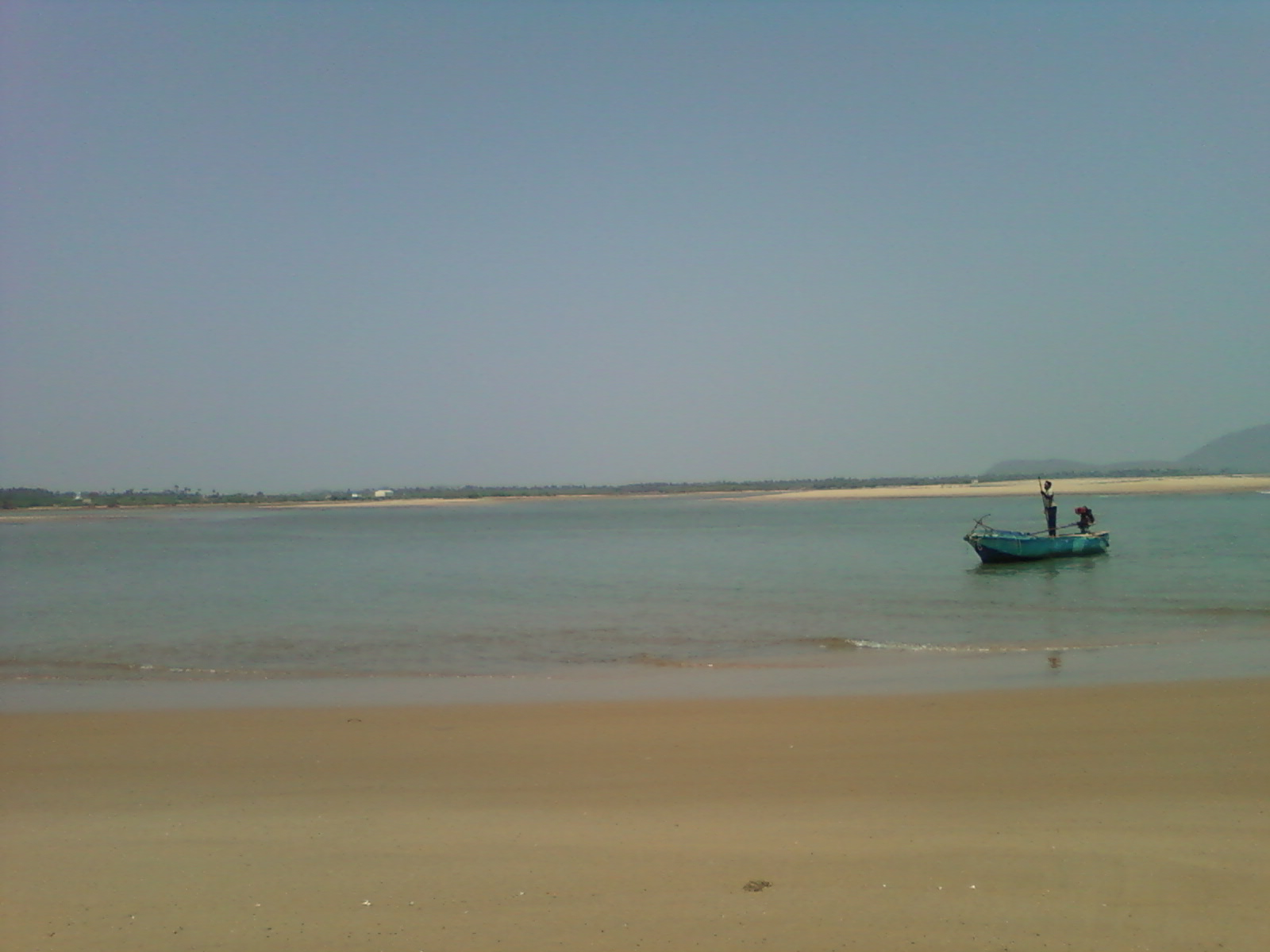
- River Gosthani at Bheemili

- Location within Visakhapatnam
- Coordinates: 17.890382°N 83.455465°E
- Location: Visakhapatnam district, Andhra Pradesh, India

Bheemili Beach is located at the origin of the Gosthani River, at a distance of 24 km from Visakhapatnam in Visakhapatnam district of the Indian state of Andhra Pradesh. The beach reflects the British and Dutch settlements of the 17th century.

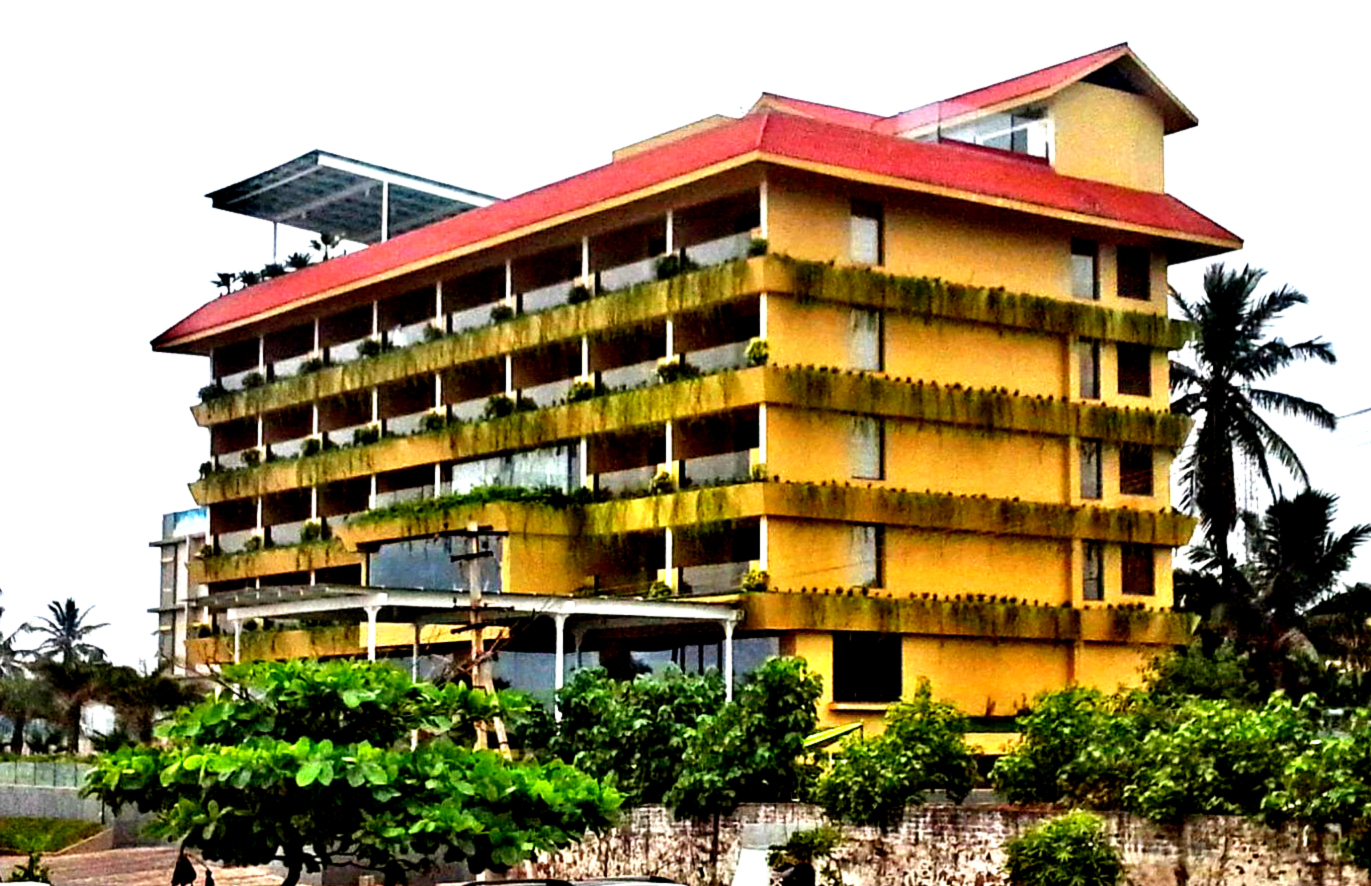
Novotel beach resort at Bheemunipatnam

== History ==
The East India Company and Dutch East India Company both had trading ports here.

== Transportation ==
APSRTC runs buses to this area; with these routes:

Route number	Start	End	Via
900K	Railway station	Bheemli	RTC complex, Siripuram, 3 Town police station, Pedda waltair, Lawsonsbay colony, MVP colony, Rushikonda, Gitam, Mangamaripeta, INS Kalinga
999	Railway station	Bheemli	RTC complex Maddilapalem, Zoo park, Endada, Carshed, Madhurawada/ Kommadi Jn, KM stone

== Tourism development ==
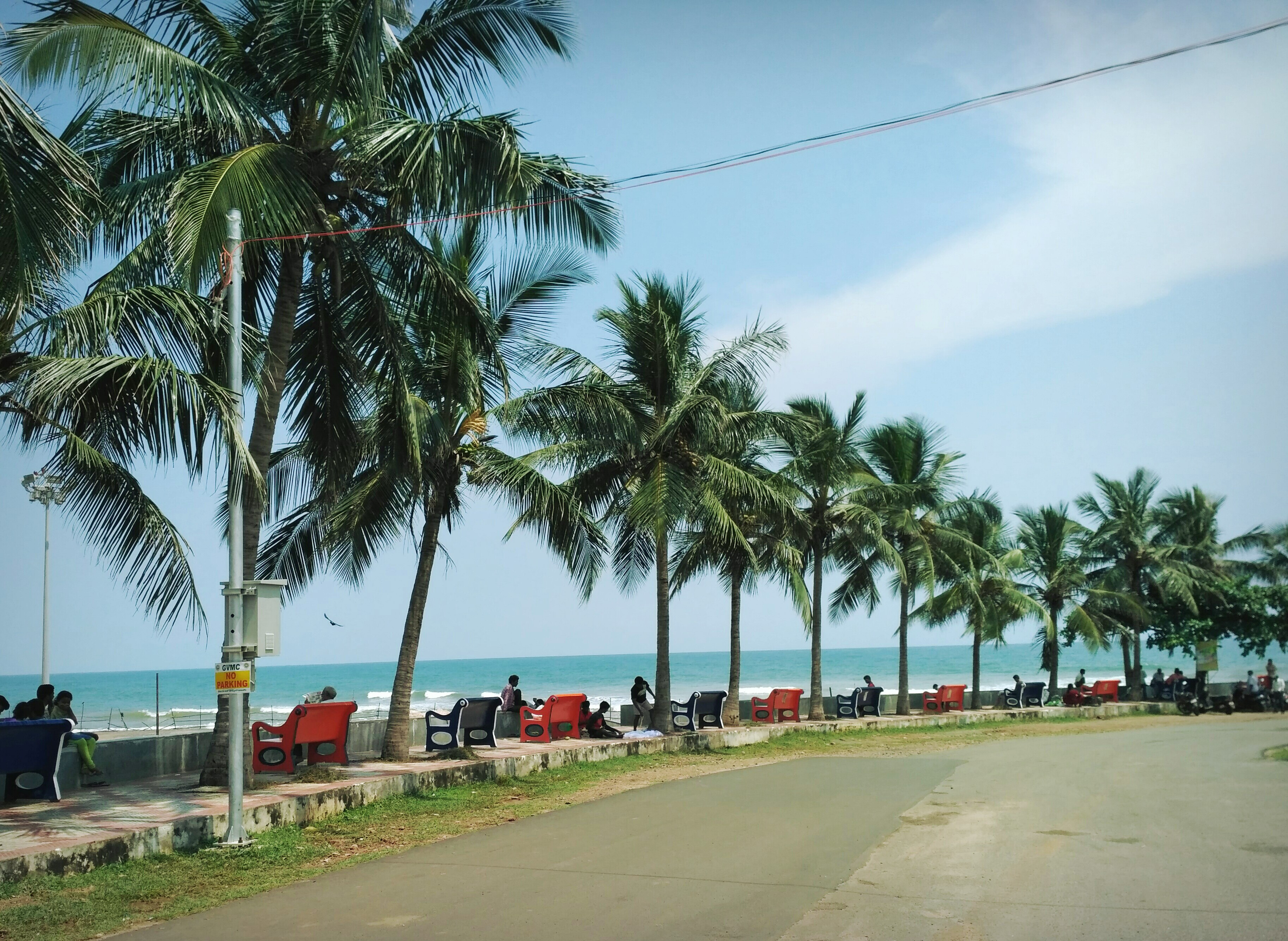
Seating along the beach road.

Visakhapatnam Urban Development Authority is developing infrastructure for promotion of tourism at global level, such as a tourism facilities, improvements along the shore with beach park on Visakhapatnam−Bheemili beach road.

== See also ==
- List of beaches in India
