= Vodarevu Beach =

Beach in Andhra Pradesh, India

- Beach
- Coordinates: 15.7956°N 80.4142°E
- Location: Chirala, Bapatla district, Andhra Pradesh, India

Vodarevu Beach is located about 6 km from Chirala on the East coast of Bay of Bengal. It is situated in Bapatla district of Andhra Pradesh. Coconut trees line the shore. Vodarevu Beach is shortest distance beach from Hyderabad and Telangana Every week end lot of tourists from Hyderabad and Telangana visiting here.

== See also ==
- List of beaches in India
