= Radhanagar Beach =

Beach on Havelock Island, India

- Sandy beach
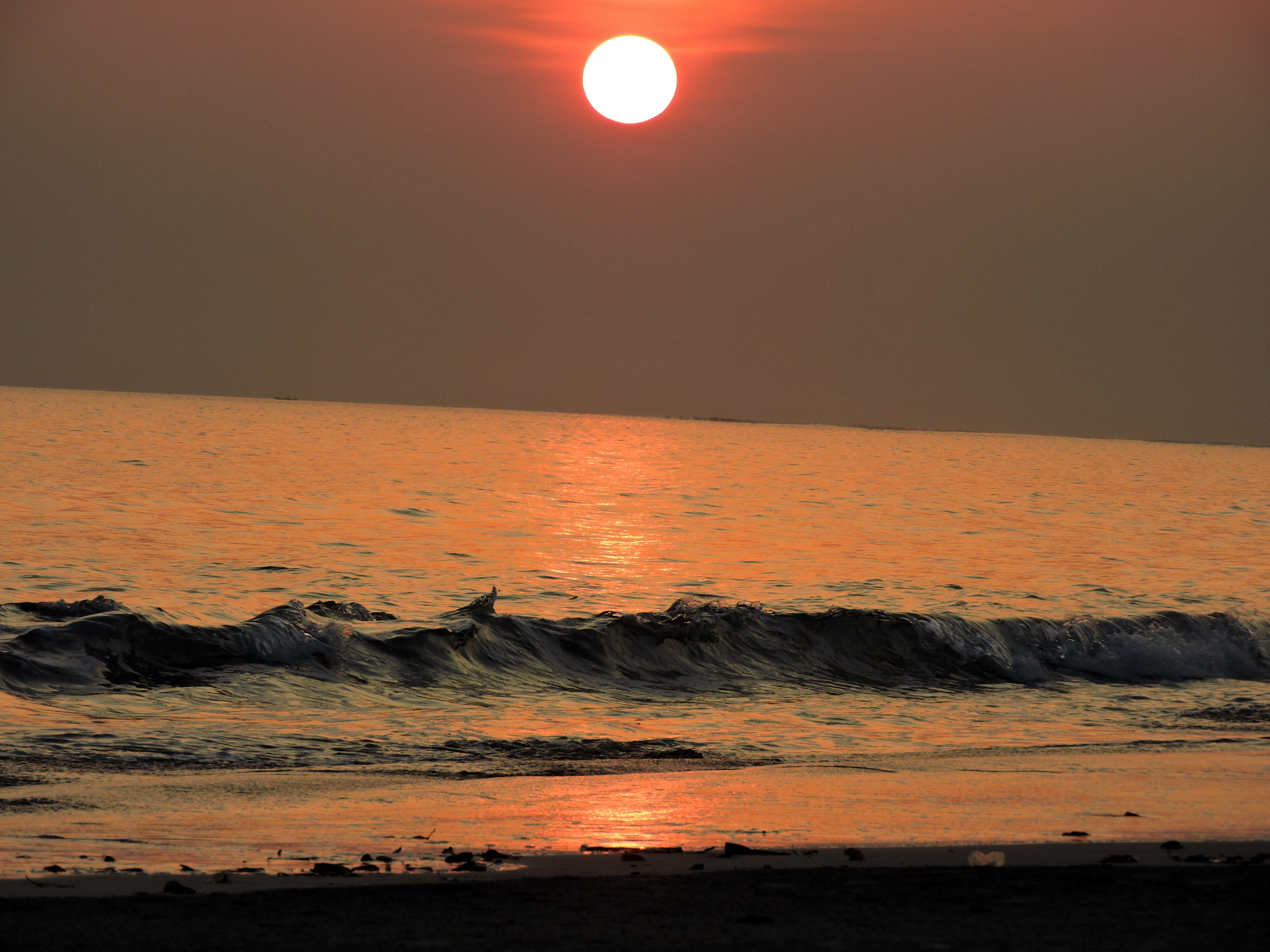
- Radha Nagar beach, Havelock Island, Andamn,- Sun set view
- Interactive map of Radhanagar Beach
- Coordinates: 11.9820°N 92.9640°E
- Location: Havelock Island, Andaman and Nicobar Islands, India
- Part of: Havelock Island
- Water bodies: Bay of Bengal

Dimensions
  - Length: 2 km
  - Width: Variable
- Elevation: 0 m

Radhanagar Beach is a beach located on Havelock Island (officially known as Swaraj Dweep), in the Andaman and Nicobar Islands, India. Recognized for its natural beauty and environmental sustainability, it has been awarded the Blue Flag beach certification, an international eco-label for beaches meeting strict environmental, safety, and cleanliness standards.

== Location and accessibility ==
Radhanagar Beach is on the western coast of Havelock Island, about 12 kilometres from Havelock Jetty. It can be reached through ferry from Port Blair, automobile, and government buses from Havelock Jetty.

== Environment and natural features ==
The beach is known for its white sand, clear turquoise waters, and dense tropical forests. The gentle waves make it suitable for swimming, and the beach is considered one of the cleanest in India.

== Recognition ==
The beach was ranked among the top 10 beaches in Asia by TripAdvisor's Travelers' Choice Awards and featured as one of the best beaches in the world by Time Magazine in 2004.

== See also ==
- Andaman and Nicobar Islands
- Havelock Island
- Blue Flag beach
