= Hukitola =

Island off the coast of India

Hukitola Island
- Location within Odisha

Geography
- Location: Bay of Bengal
- Coordinates: 20.404°N 86.791°E
- Area: 0.1606979 acres (0.0650321 ha)
- Length: 4 km (2.5 mi)

Administration
- India
- State: Odisha
- District: Kendrapara District

Hukitola Island is located in Odisha, India, north of the Mahanadi river delta. The island was formed from silt deposits. There is a building on the island, which was constructed by British colonists circa 1867 to serve as a rice storehouse. The building has a total plinth area of more than 7,000 square feet, which carries proof of British architectural skill with rainwater harvesting systems.

In late 2013, the building began to be renovated by the State Archaeological Department, with the goal of making it into an eco-tourist spot.

== Gallery ==
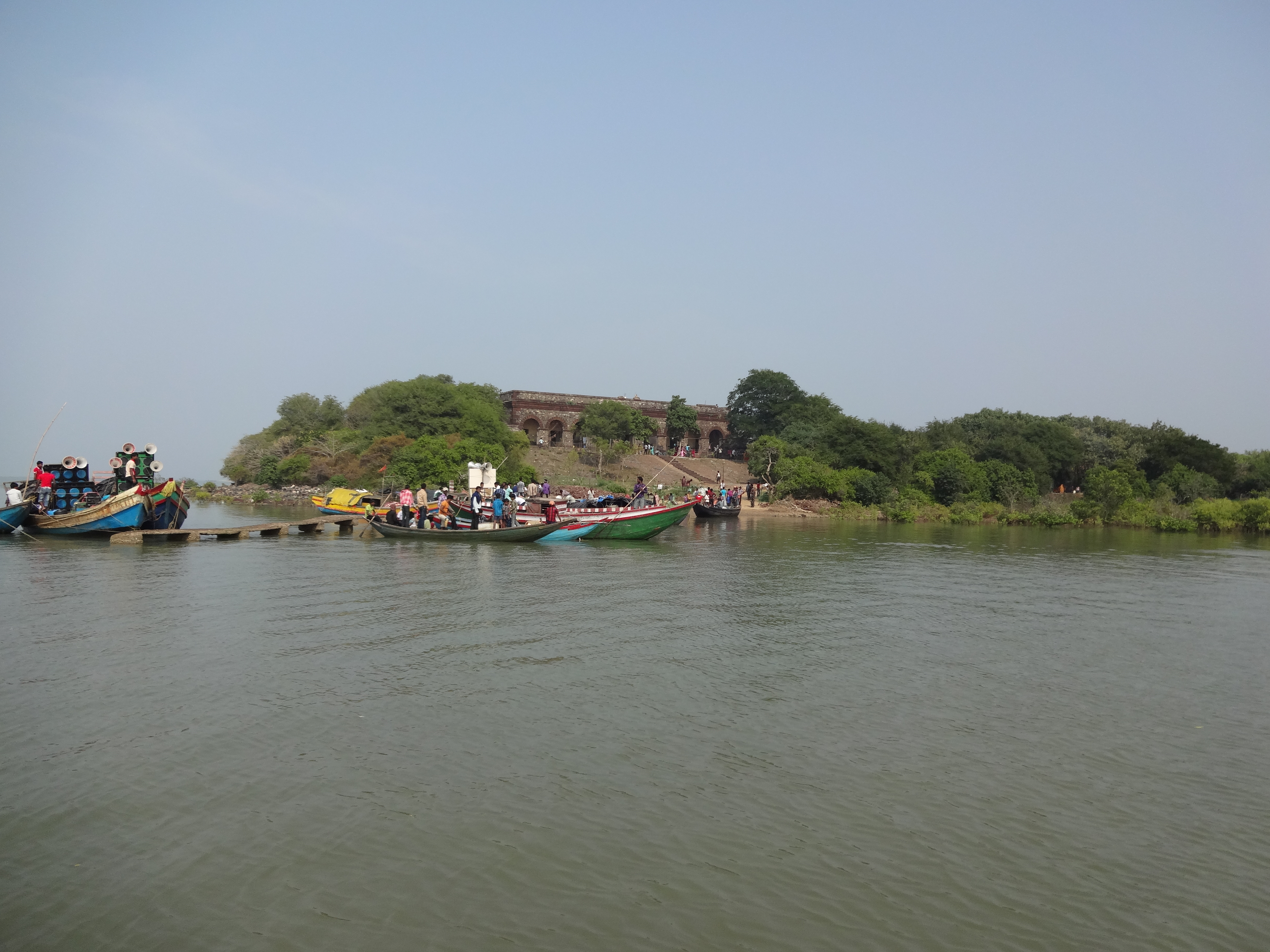

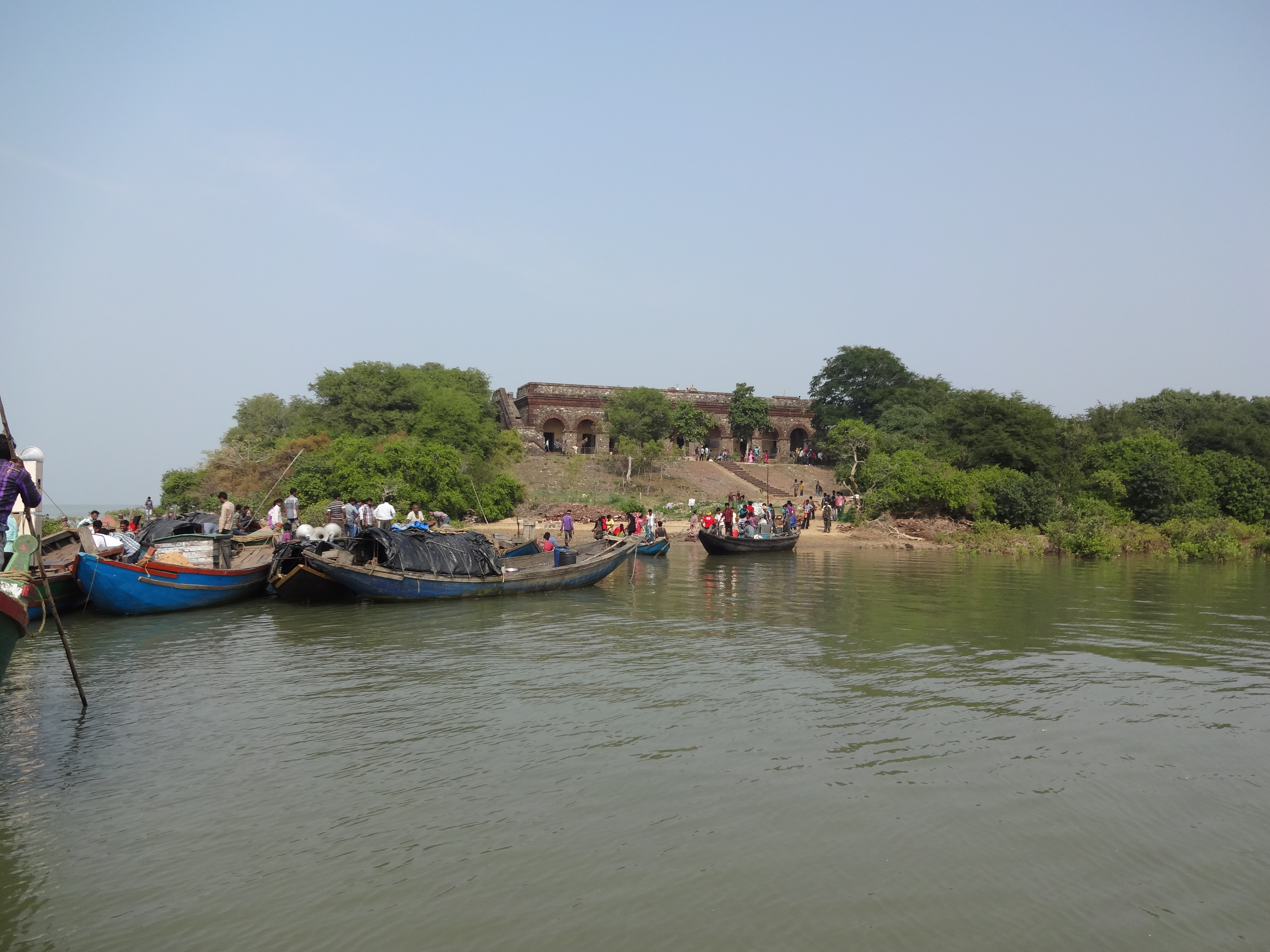

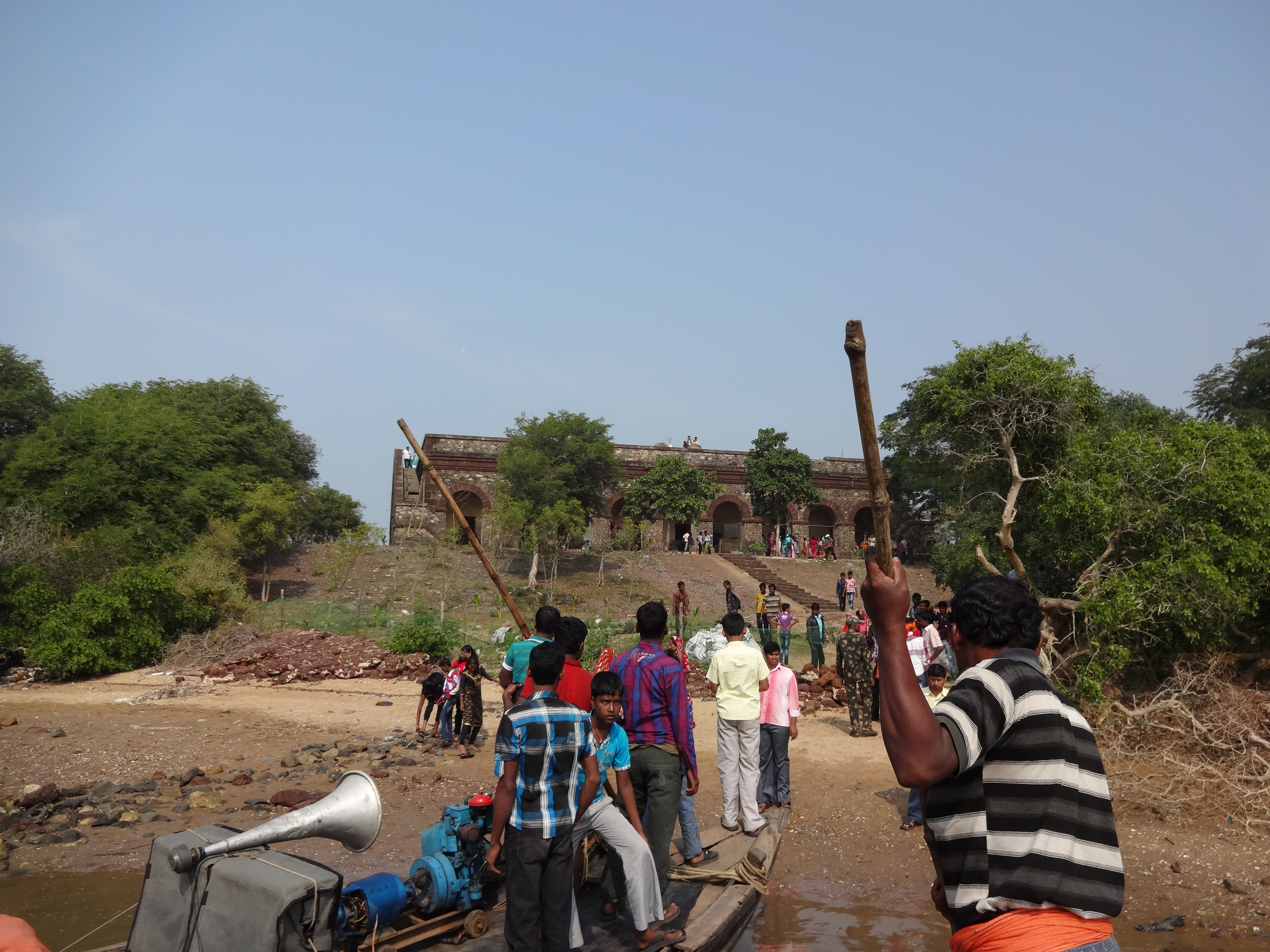

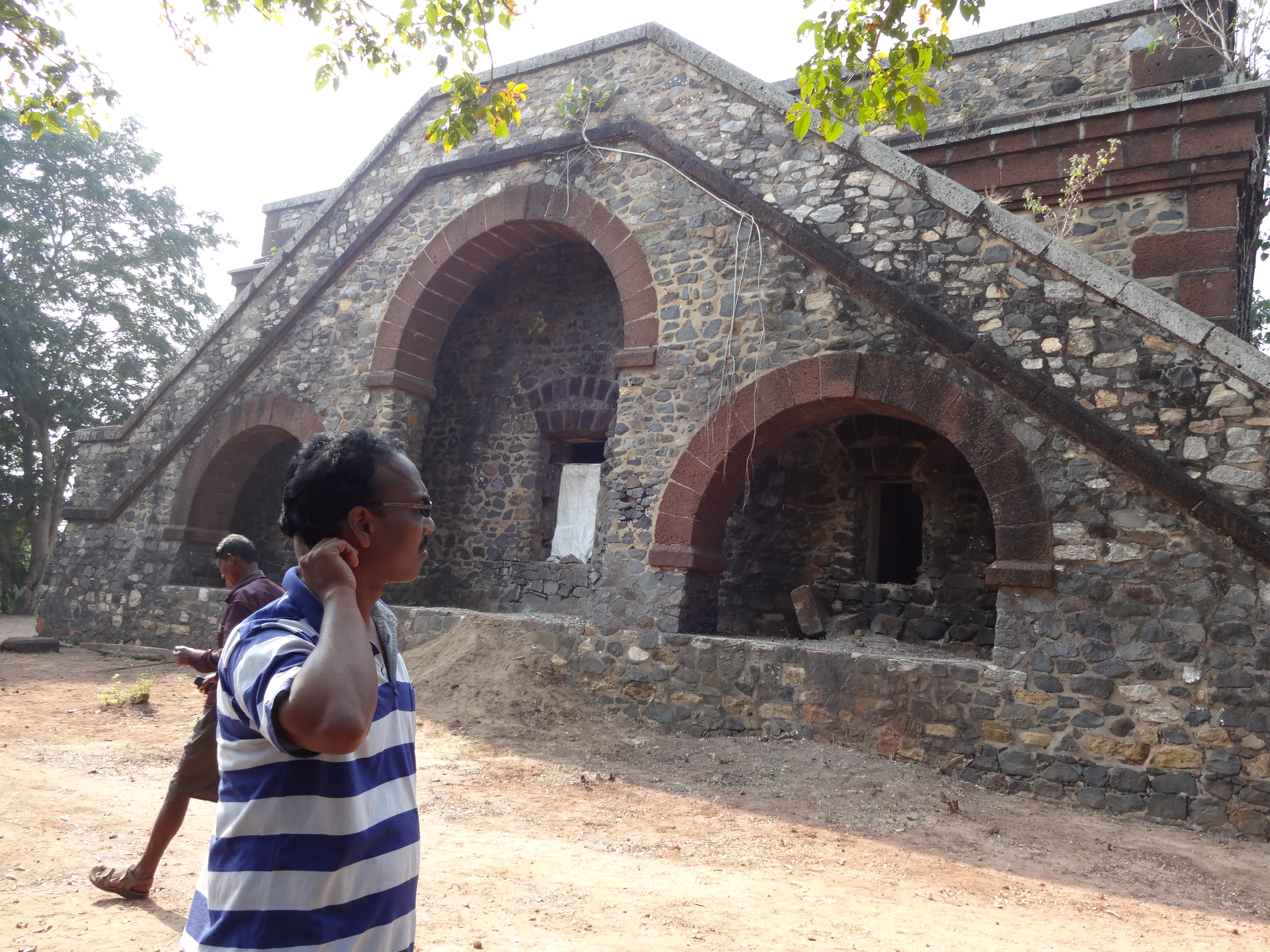

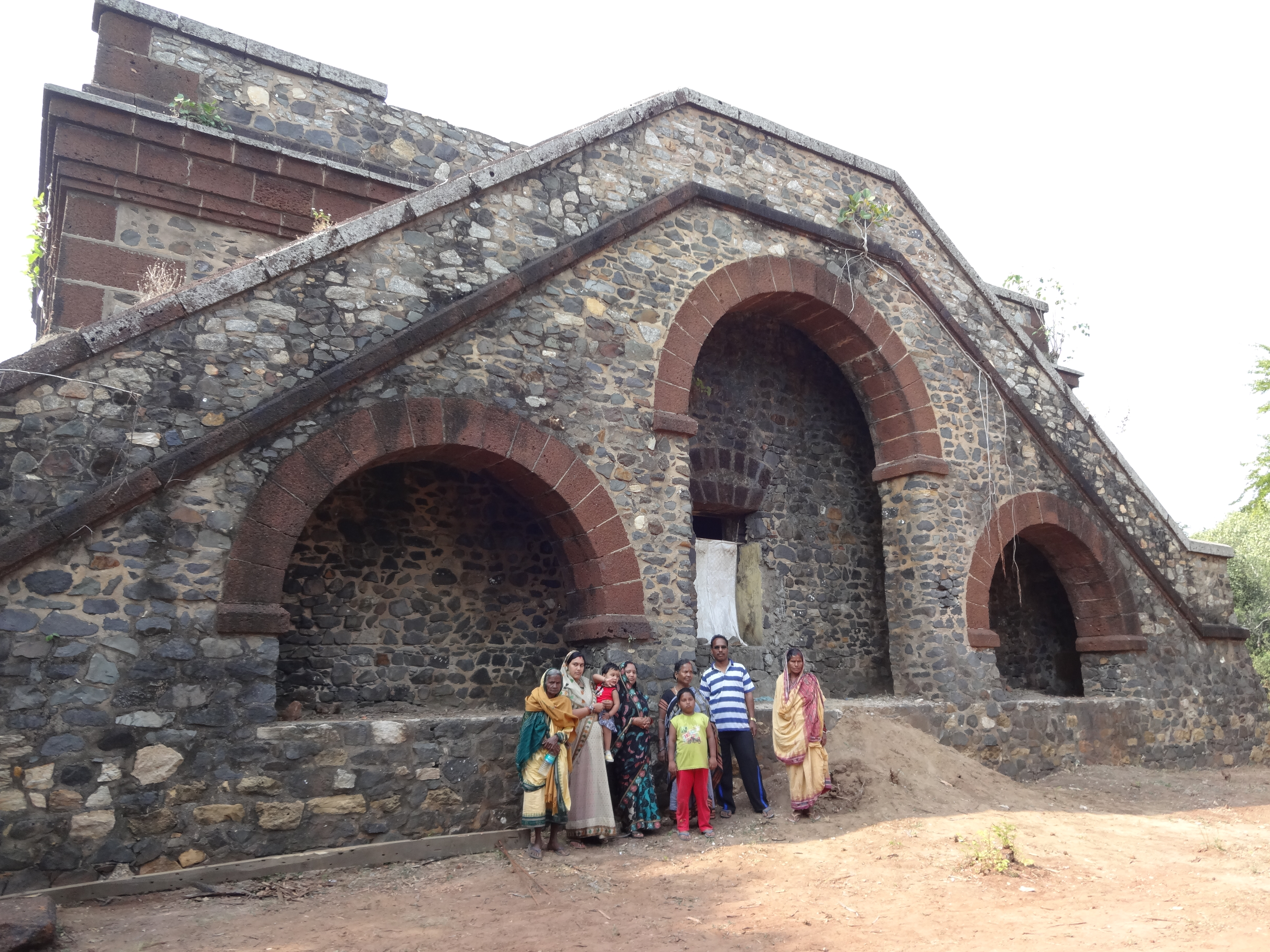
