= Rushikonda Beach =

Beach in Andhra Pradesh, India

- Beach
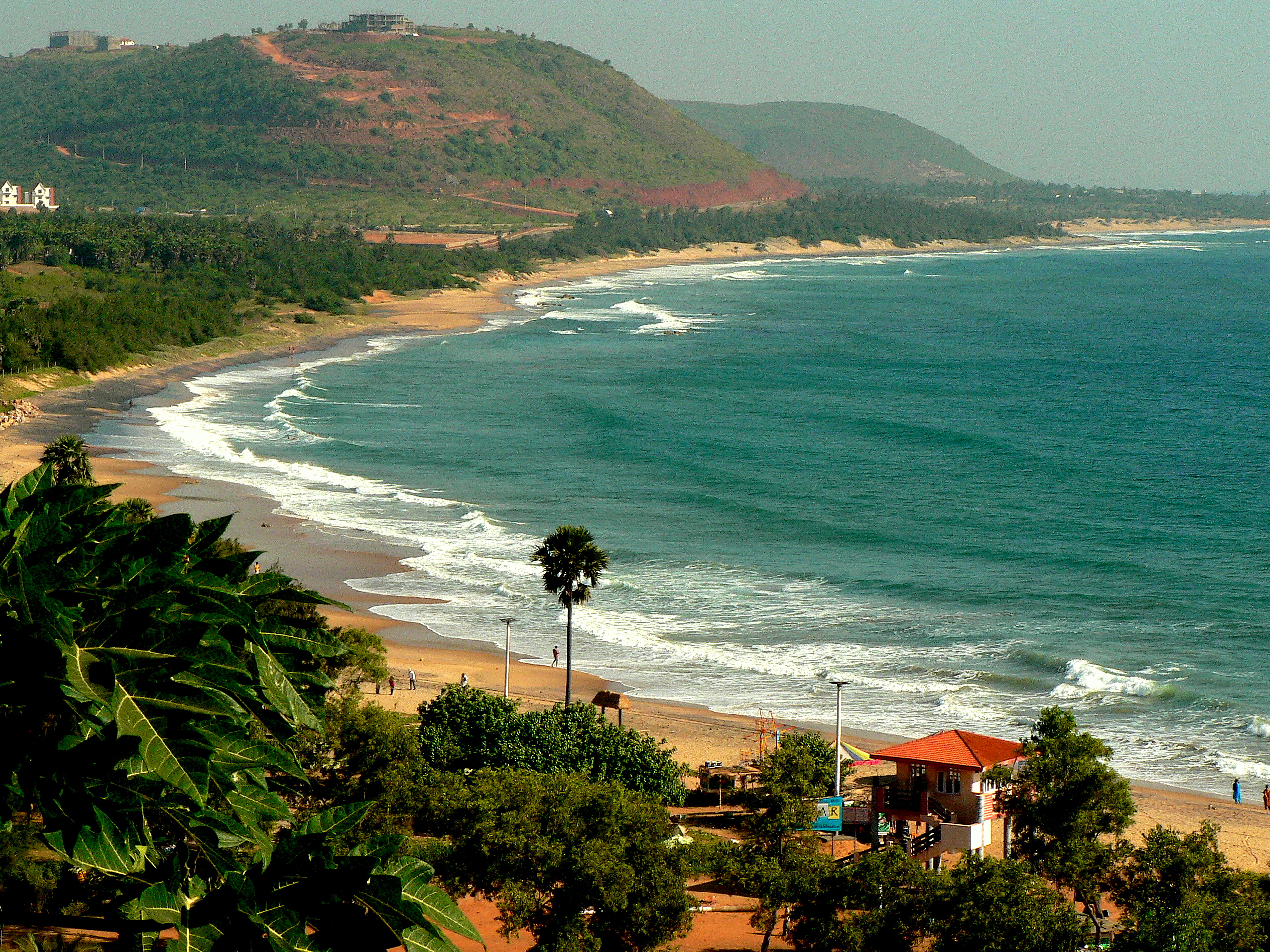

- Coordinates: 17.7825201°N 83.3851154°E
- Location: Visakhapatnam, Andhra Pradesh, India

Rushikonda Beach is situated in Visakhapatnam on the shore of the Bay of Bengal in the Indian state of Andhra Pradesh. The beach is maintained by the Andhra Pradesh Tourism Development Corporation (APTDC).

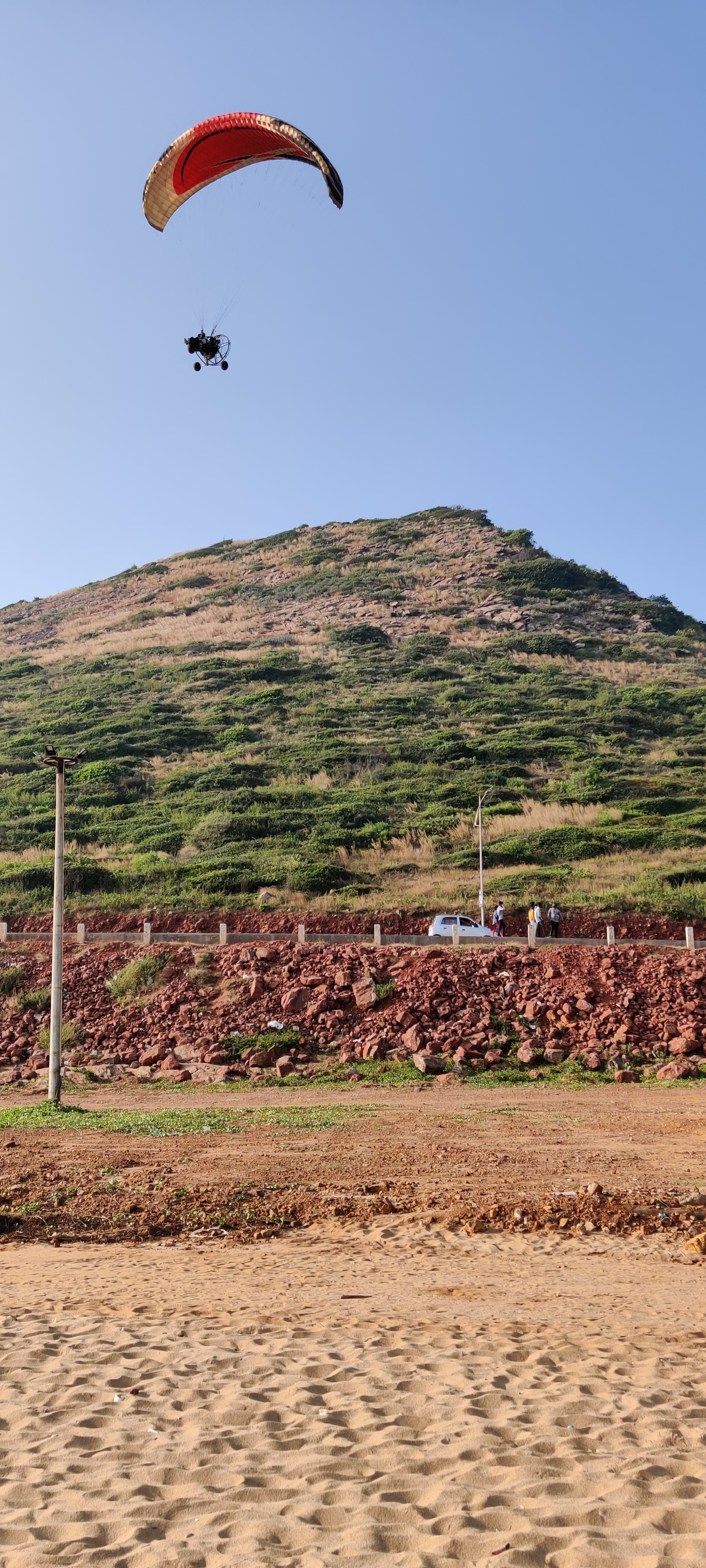
Paragliding at Rushikonda Beach.

== Transportation ==
APSRTC runs buses to this area with these routes:

Route number	Start	End	Via
900K	Railway station	Bheemli beach	RTC complex, Siripuram, 3 Town police station, Pedda waltair, Lawsonsbay colony, Ushodaya, MVP colony, Sagarnagar, Rushikonda, Gitam, Mangamaripeta, INS Kalinga
900T	Railway station	Tagarapuvalasa	RTC complex, Siripuram, 3 Town police station, Pedda waltair, Lawsonsbay colony, Ushodaya, MVP colony, Sagarnagar, Rushikonda, Gitam, Mangamaripeta, INS Kalinga

== See also ==
- List of beaches in India
