= Konark Beach =

Beach in Odisha, India

Coordinates: 19.866498°N 86.114242°E

Konark Beach or Chandrabhaga Beach is situated in Odisha on the eastern coast of India and is considered to be India's finest beach. It is situated three km east of the Sun temple of Konark, in the Puri district in the state of Odisha, India. It is 30 km from the city of Puri. Formerly Chandrabhaga Beach was considered a place of natural cure for lepers. The beach on the coast of Konark becoming India's first to get the Blue Flag certification — a tag given to environment-friendly clean beaches, equipped with amenities of international standards for tourists.
