= Dhanushkodi Beach =

Beach on the tip of the Rameswaram island

Coordinates: 9.215135°N 79.358524°E

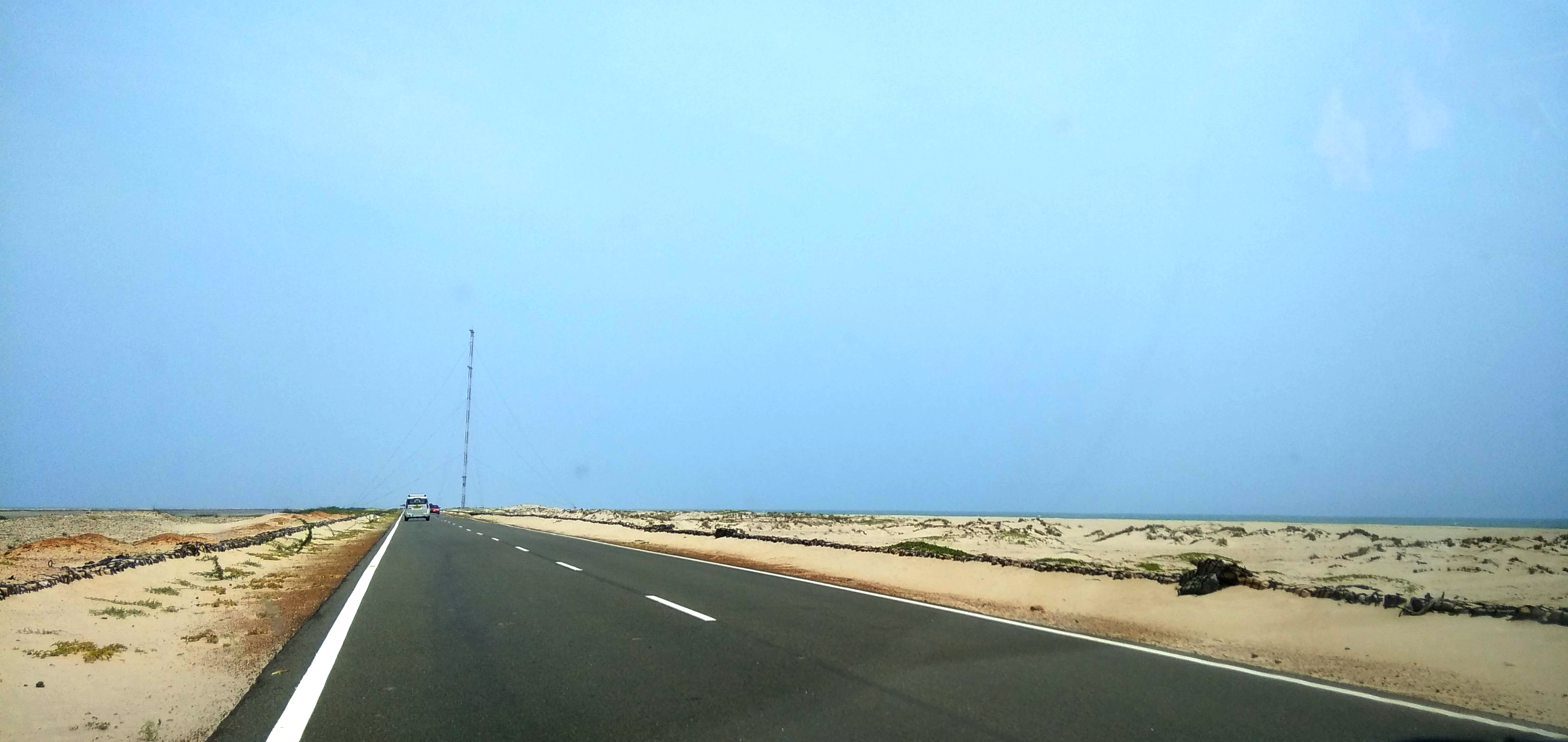
Road to Arichal Munai

Dhanushkodi Beach lies on the tip of the Rameswaram island. In this beach, the Bay of Bengal and Gulf of Mannar Sea of Indian Ocean merge which is known as Arichal Munai in Tamil. Before 1964, Dhanushkodi was a busy, crowded city. The Dhanushkodi Beach attracted thousands of tourists each day.

In 1964, Dhanushkodi was hit by a cyclone and was almost destroyed by it. It is considered a ghost town, as the place became uninhabitable. Many tourists still visit Dhanushkodi Beach. The main attractions of the beach are Ram Sethu view point, also known as Adam's Bridge, which is said to be constructed by the army of Vanaras (monkeys) for Lord Rama according to Hindu Legend.
