= Uppada Beach =

Beach in Andhra Pradesh, India

- Beach
- Location within Andhra Pradesh
- Coordinates: 17.0818°N 82.3346°E
- Location: Uppada, Kakinada district, Andhra Pradesh, India

Uppada Beach is located near Kakinada in Kakinada district of the Indian state of Andhra Pradesh. APTDC undertakes the developmental activities in order to promote tourism.

== Cyclone effects ==
After the beach was eroded by Cyclone Helen in 2013, a retaining wall was built to protect from future damage.
