= Kashid =

- village
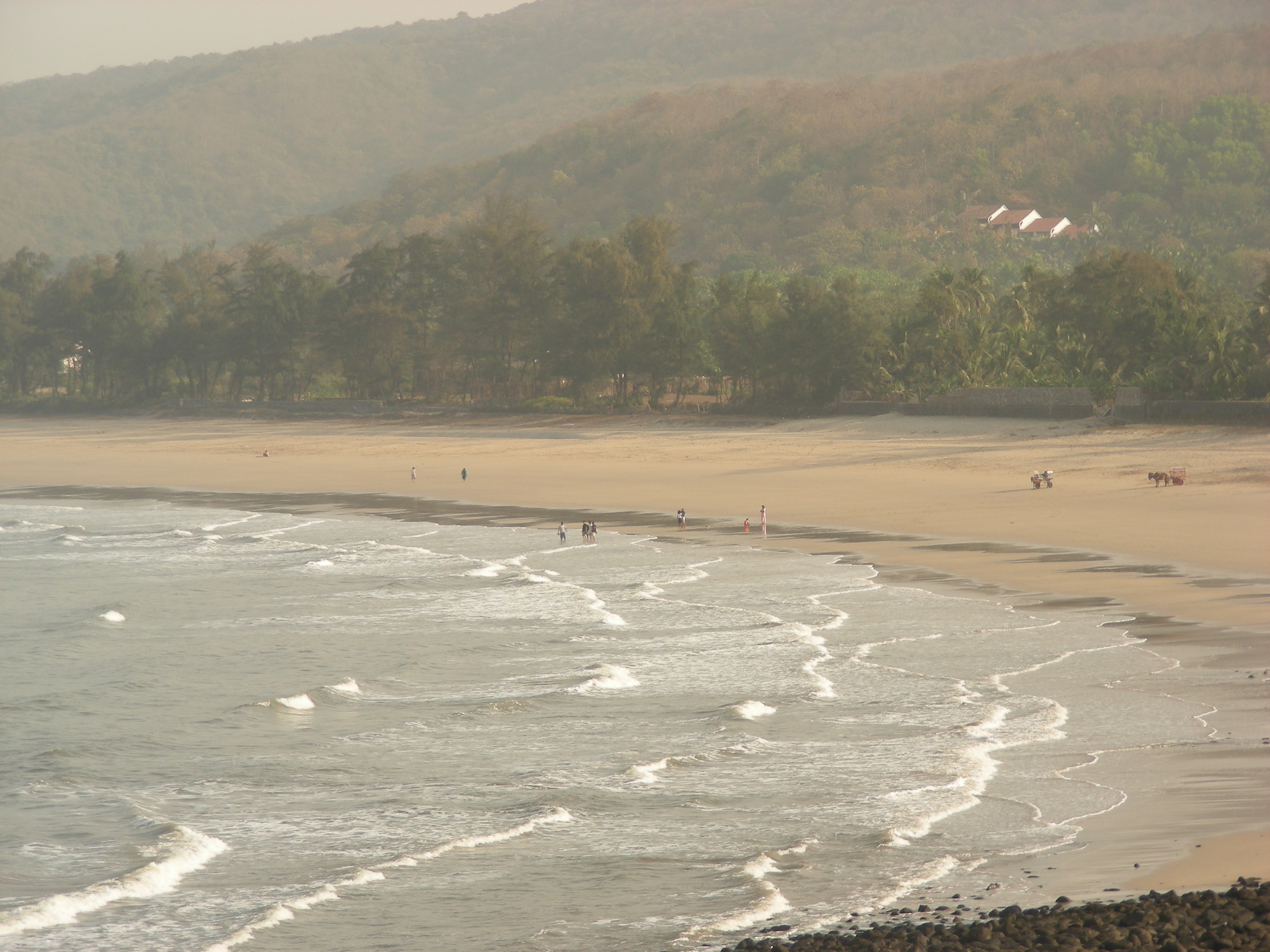
- Kashid Beach

- Location in Maharashtra, India
- Coordinates: 18°26′30″N 72°54′20″E
- Country: India
- State: Maharashtra

Government
  - Type: Grampanchayat

Languages
  - Official: Marathi
- Time zone: UTC+5:30 (IST)
- Nearest city: Murud
- Website: http://www.kashidbeach.com

Kashid is a beach village in Murud taluka on the shores of the Arabian Sea, in the North Konkan region of Maharashtra, India. It is located 15 km from Murud City and 135 km from Mumbai on the Alibag-Murud road. The beach is wedged between two rocky hills in a semi circular arch and is located in between the stretch of the sea in North Konkan between Mandwa and Murud-Janjira. Water sports activities are available on the beach during peak hours. Hotels and homestays are available all along the State highway which runs close to the beach. There are some places to visit and in around Kashid like the Phansad Bird sanctuary, the Korlai fort and the Datta Mandir at Revdanda. A Ro-Ro ferry service started about two years ago, allows one to drive down to Kashid on a ship from Ferry Wharf to Mandwa and then by road from there on.However prior reservations are a must especially on week-ends
