= Perupalem Beach =

Beach in Andhra Pradesh, India

- Beach
- Location within Andhra Pradesh
- Coordinates: 16.3404314°N 81.6017932°E
- Location: Perupalem, West Godavari district, Andhra Pradesh, India

Perupalem Beach is located on the coast of Bay of Bengal, in West Godavari district of the Indian state of Andhra Pradesh. The beach is being developed for tourism by the state tourism board, APTDC.

== See also ==
- List of beaches in India
