= Dwarka =

Town in Gujarat, India

- Town
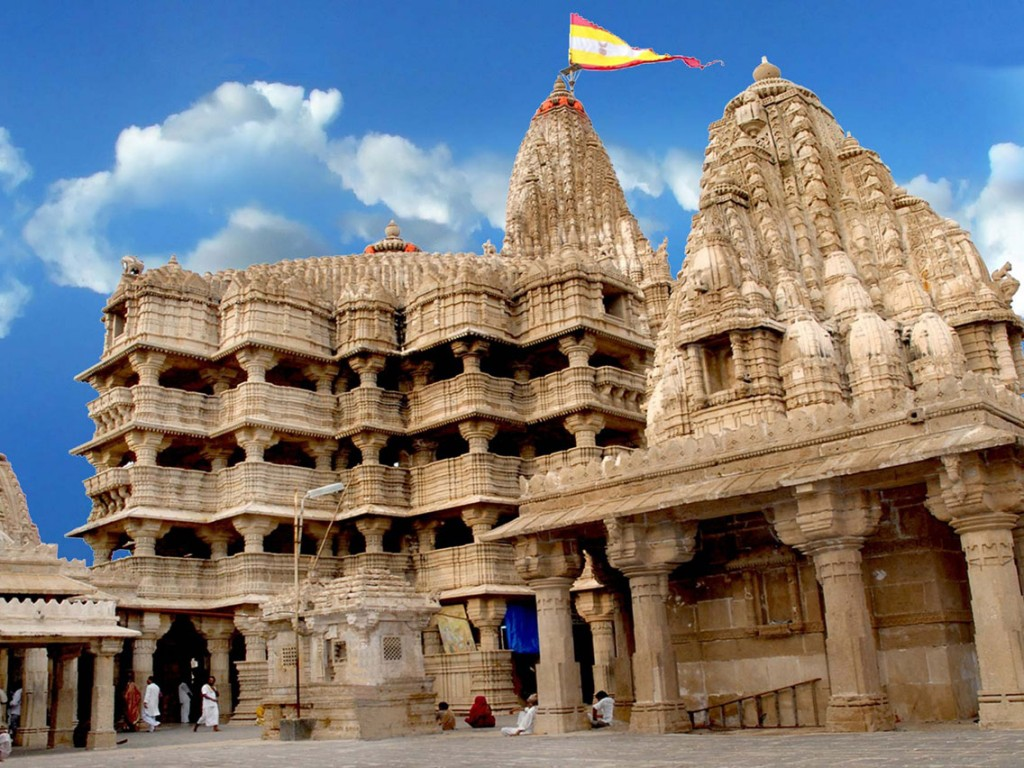
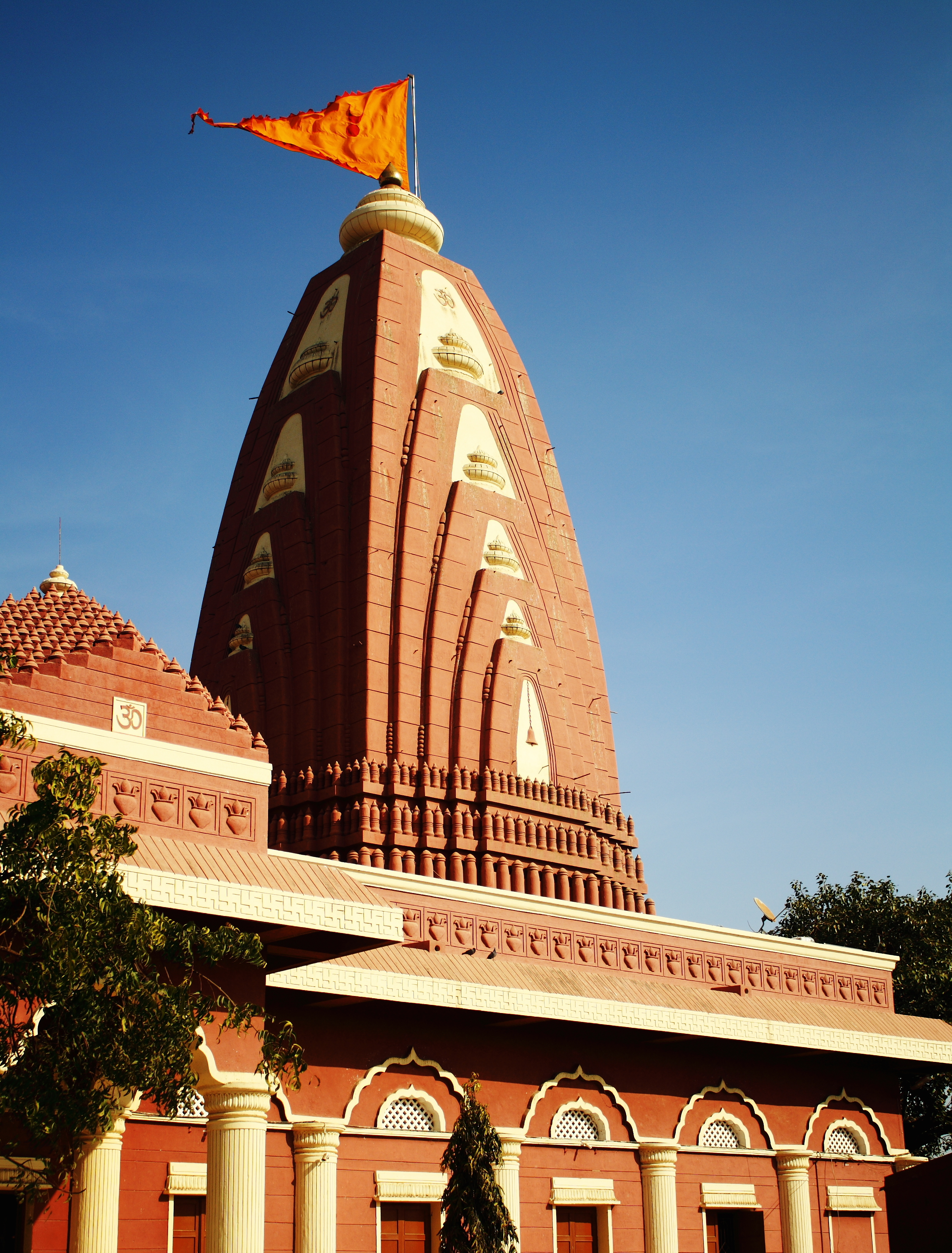
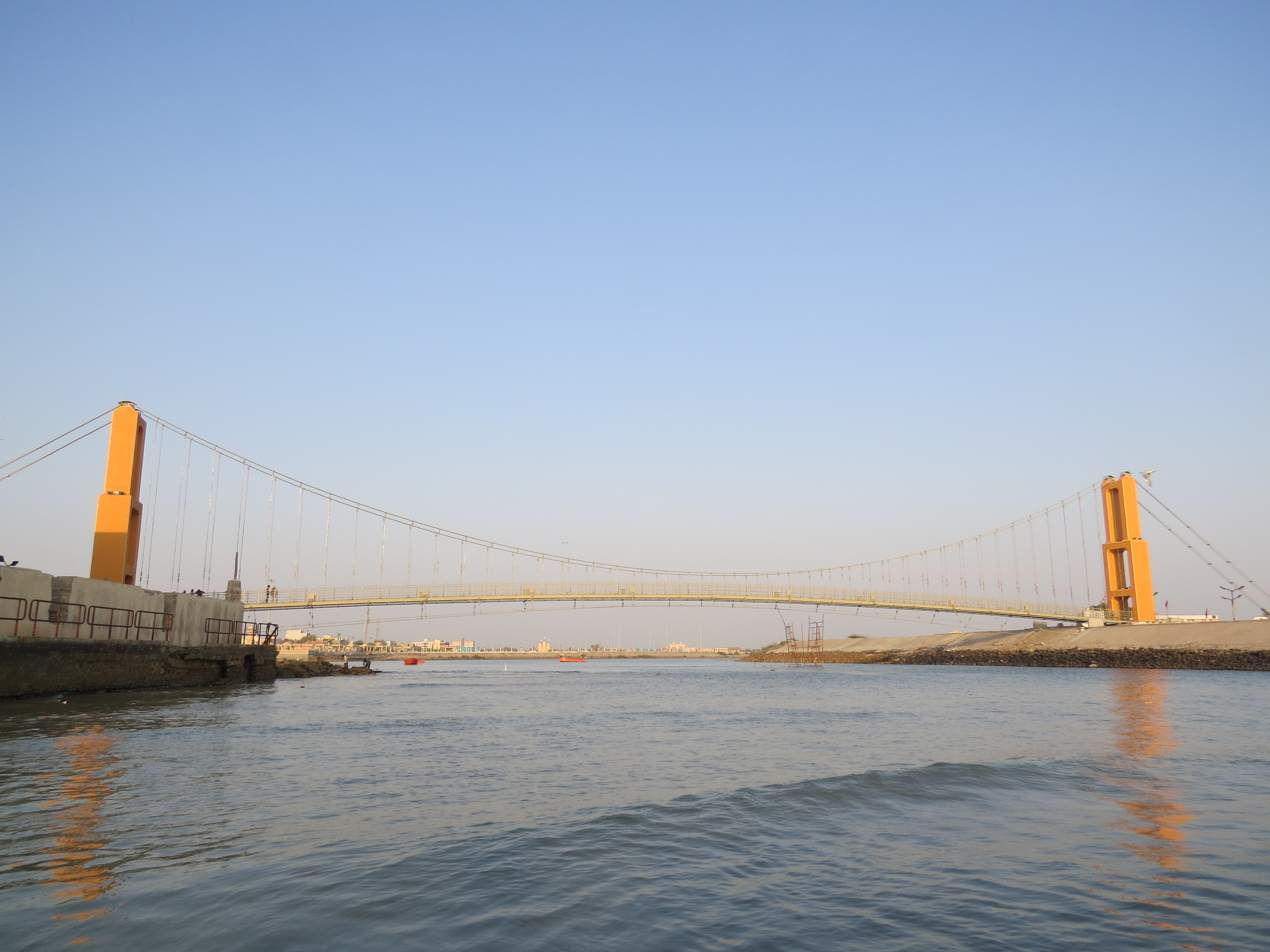
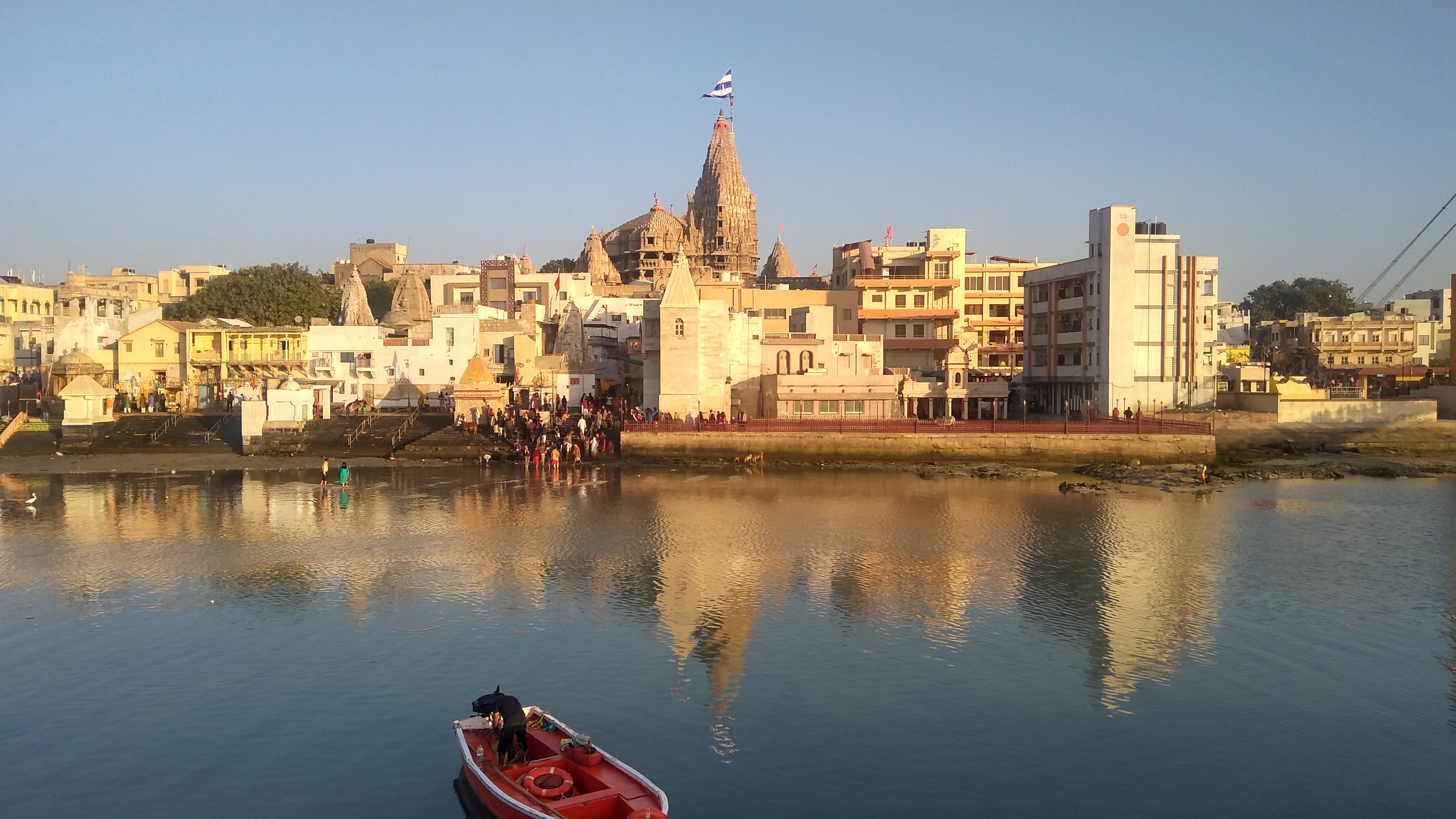
- Clockwise from top: Dwarkadhish Temple, Sudama Setu, Gomti Ghat, Nageshvara Jyotirlinga

- Location within Gujarat
- Coordinates: 22°14′47″N 68°58′00″E
- Country: India
- State: Gujarat
- Region: Saurashtra
- District: Devbhumi Dwarka
- Founder: Krishna

Government
  - Type: Municipality
  - Body: Dwarka Nagarpalika
- Elevation: 0 m (0 ft)

Population (2011)
  - Total: 38,873

Languages
  - Official: Gujarati
- Time zone: UTC+5:30 (IST)
- PIN: 361335
- Vehicle registration: GJ-37
- Website: https://devbhumidwarka.nic.in/

Char Dham

Dwarka is a coastal town and municipality of Devbhumi Dwarka district in the Indian state of Gujarat. It is located on the western shore of the Okhamandal Peninsula on the right bank of the Gomti River at the mouth of the Gulf of Kutch facing the Arabian Sea.

Dwarka has the Dwarkadhish Temple dedicated to Krishna, which is one of four sacred Hindu pilgrimage sites called the Chardham founded by Adi Shankaracharya at the four corners of the country. The Dwarkadhish Temple was established as a monastic center and forms part of the Dwarka temple complex. Dwarka is also one of the seven most ancient religious cities (Sapta Puri) in India.

Dwarka is part of the "Krishna pilgrimage circuit" which includes Vrindavan, Mathura, Barsana, Gokul, Govardhan, Kurukshetra, Veraval and Puri. It is one of 12 heritage cities across the country selected under the Heritage City Development and Augmentation Yojana (HRIDAY) scheme of the Government of India to develop civic infrastructure.

The town has a hot, arid climate with a 16-day rainy season. It had a population of 38,873 in 2011. The main festival of Janmashtami is celebrated in Bhadrapada (August–September).

== Etymology ==
The name Dwarka (Sanskrit: Dvārakā, द्वारका) is derived from the Sanskrit word dvāra (द्वार), meaning “door,” “gate,” or “entrance,” with the suffix -ka denoting a place. The term Dvārakā is thus interpreted as “the city of gates” or “gateway city”.

The name occurs in ancient Indian texts such as the Mahabharata and the Harivamsa, where Dvārakā is described as a fortified coastal city with multiple gates. The description of the city in these texts has been noted in modern scholarship in the context of early Indian urban traditions.

Modern scholarship and archaeology have also examined the historical and cultural significance of Dwarka, particularly in relation to coastal settlements in western India and traditions associated with Krishna. Over time, the Sanskrit Dvārakā evolved into regional forms such as Dwarka in modern Indo-Aryan languages, including Gujarati and Hindi.

== History ==
=== Puranic traditions ===
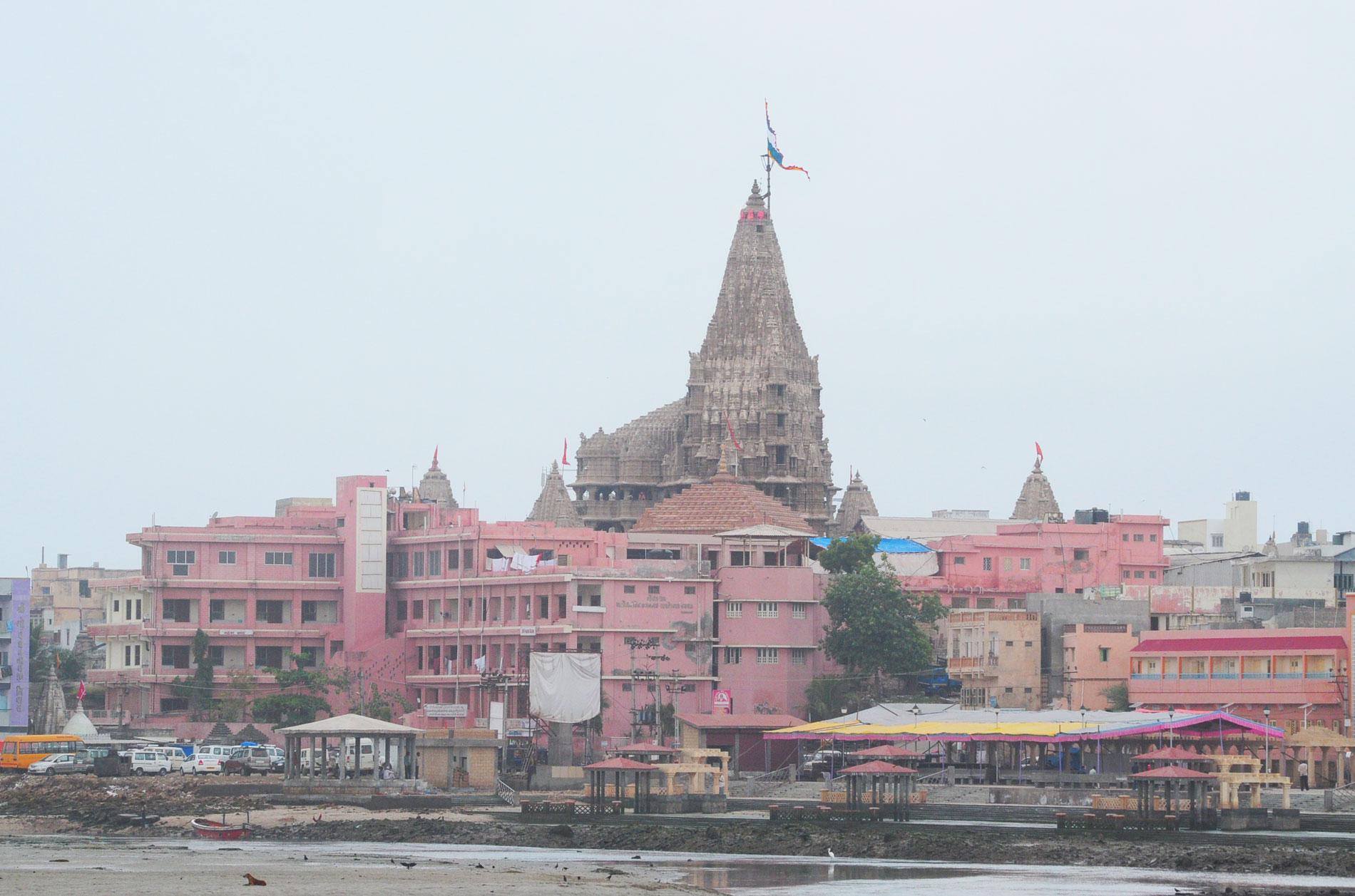
Dwarika Jagat Mandir (or Dwarkadhish Temple), view from entrance of the town.

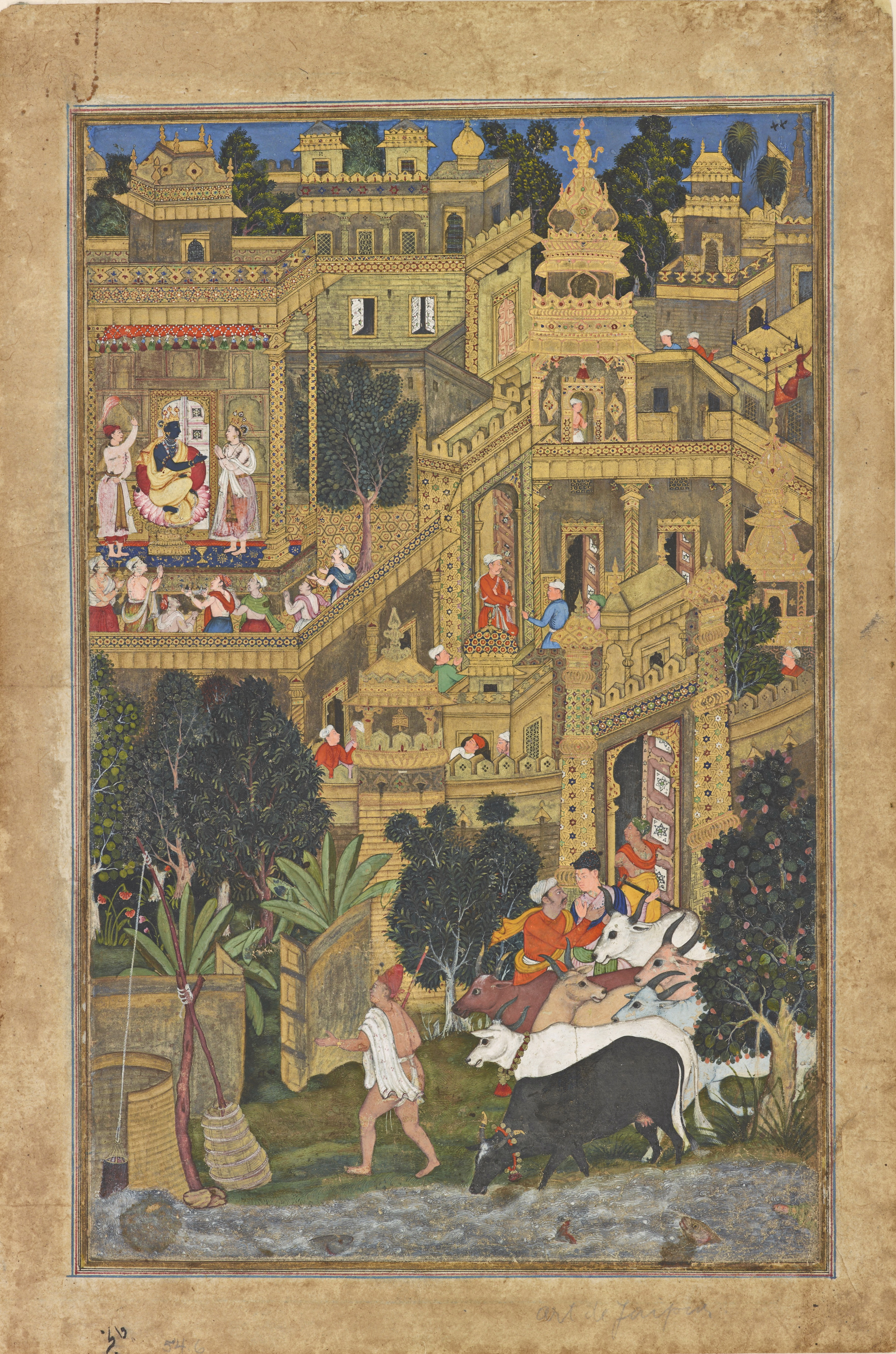
A painting depicting Krishna's Dwarka, made during Akbar's reign, from the Smithsonian Institution.

Dwarka is considered as the first capital of Gujarat. The name literally means gateway. Dwarka has also been referred to throughout its history as "Mokshapuri", "Dwarkamati", and "Dwarkavati". It is mentioned in the ancient epic period of the Mahabharata. According to legend, Krishna settled here after he defeated and killed his uncle Kamsa at Mathura. This mythological account of Krishna's migration to Dwarka from Mathura is closely associated with the culture of Gujarat. Krishna is also said to have reclaimed 12 yojanas or 96 square kilometres (37 sq mi) of land from the sea to create Dwarka.

Archaeological findings suggest the original temple Dwarkadhish Temple dedicated to Krishna was built in 200 BCE at the earliest. The temple was rebuilt and enlarged in the 15th–16th century. The temple is also the location of Dwaraka maţha, also called Sharada Matha/Peeth and "western peeth", (Note: Dvaraka Peeth, located in the west, and Sringeri Sharada Peetham, located in the south, are both called "Sharada Peeth". In the Telugu language, "Sharada" (శారద) is the name for Saraswati, the Hindu goddess of knowledge, music, arts, wisdom and learning. The Sharada Matha/Peeth is not to be confused with Sharada Peeth, a temple in Kashmir.) one of the four peeths (Sanskrit: "religious center") established by Adi Shankaracharya. As an important pilgrimage centre for Hindus, Dwarka has several notable temples, including Rukmini Devi Temple, Gomti Ghat, and Bet Dwarka. There is also a lighthouse at the land end point of Dwarka.

=== Archaeology ===
Archaeological investigations at Dwarka, both on shore and offshore in the Arabian Sea, have been performed by the Archaeological Survey of India. The first investigations carried out on land in 1963 revealed many artefacts. Excavations done at two sites on the seaward side of Dwarka brought to light submerged settlements, a large stone-built jetty, and triangular stone anchors with three holes. The settlements are in the form of exterior and interior walls, and fort bastions. From the typological classification of the anchors it is inferred that Dwarka had flourished as a port during the period of the Middle kingdoms of India. Coastal erosion was probably the cause of the destruction of what was an ancient port. Another excavation near Dwarkadhish temple took place which have yielded a shrine dedicated to Vishnu from 9th century CE, furthermore excavation were conducted which yielded a settlement from 1st century BCE another excavation was conducted in the site for the antiquity of the town, have yielded a settlement probably contemporary to Mahabharata dated around 2nd millennium BCE.

Dwarka is mentioned in the copper inscription dated 574 CE of Simhaditya, the Maitraka dynasty minister of Vallabhi. He was the son of Varahdas, the king of Dwarka. The nearby Bet Dwarka island is a religious pilgrimage site and an important archaeological site of the Late Harappan period, with one thermoluminescence date of 1570 BCE.

=== Early history ===
An epigraphic reference ascribed to Garulaka Simhaditya, the son of Varahdas, the king of Dwarka, is inscribed on a copper plate dated to 574 CE, found in Palitana. The Greek writer of the Periplus of the Erythraean Sea referred to a place called Baraca, which has been interpreted as present-day Dwarka. A reference made in Ptolemy's Geography identified Barake as an island in the Gulf of Kanthils, which has also been inferred to mean Dwarka.

One of the four dhams (religious seats), which were founded by Adi Shankaracharya (686–717 CE) at the four corners of the country, was established as a monastic centre and it forms part of the Dwarka temple complex.

=== Middle Ages to present ===
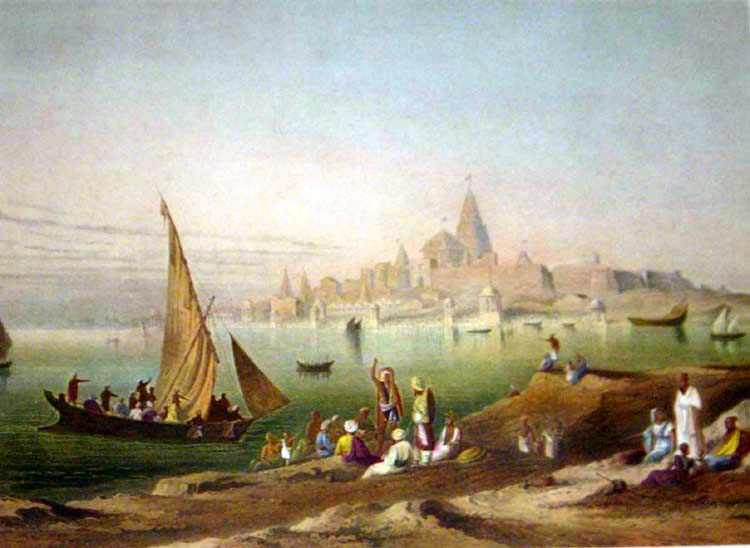
Dwarka in a painting of the late 1820s by William Purser

In 1473 the Gujarat Sultan Mahmud Begada sacked the town and destroyed the temple of Dwarka. The Jagat Mandir or the Dwarakadhisa temple was later rebuilt. Vallabha Acharya retrieved an idol of Dwarkadhish, which was revered by Rukmini. He hid it in a stepwell, known as Savitri vav, during the Muslim invasion, before moving it to Ladva village. In 1551, when Turk Aziz invaded Dwarka, the idol was shifted to the island of Bet Dwarka.

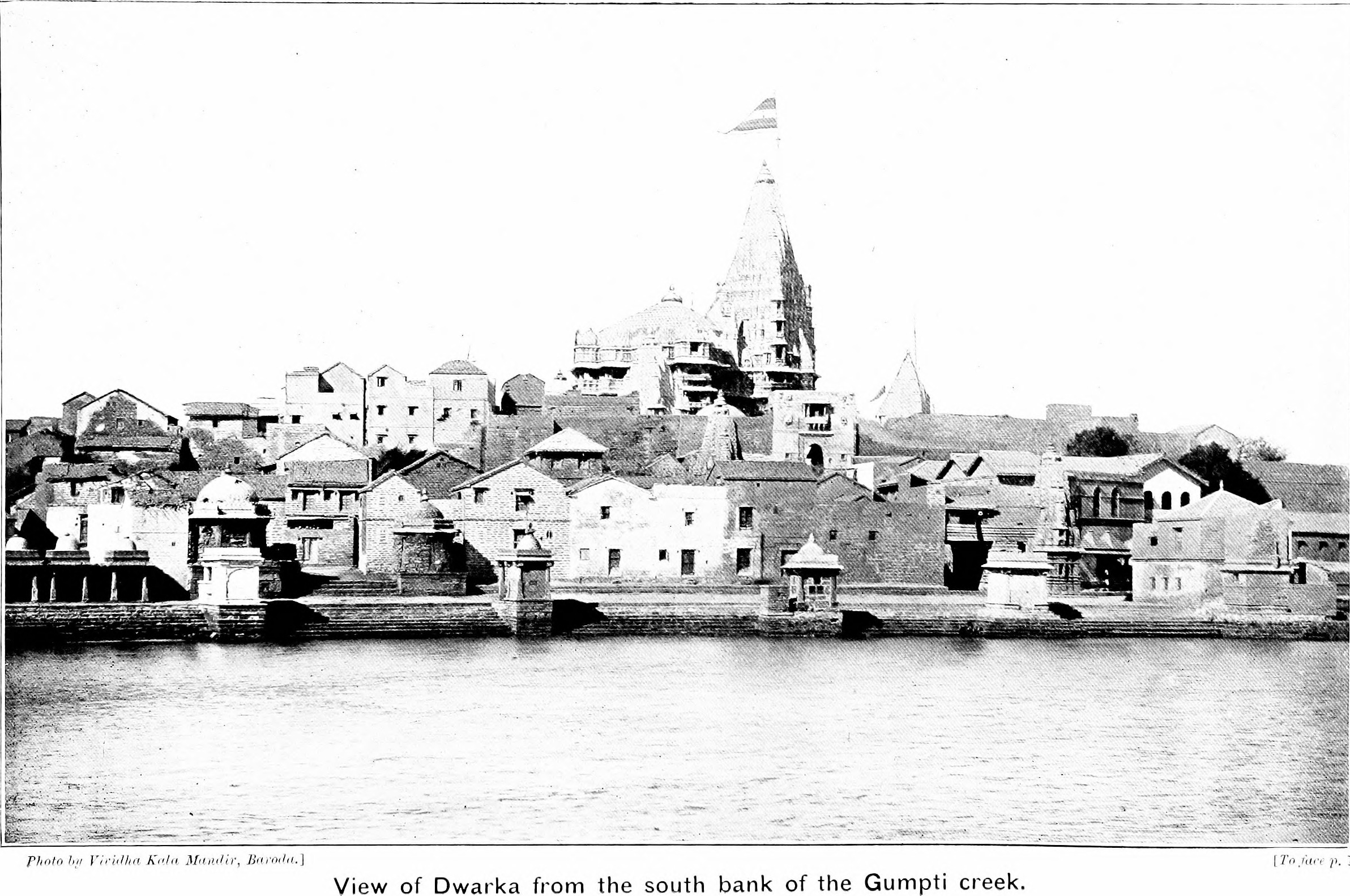
View of Dwarka from the south bank of the Gomti creek, 1909

Dwarka, along with the Okhamandal region, was under the rule of Gaekwad of Baroda state during the Indian rebellion of 1857. A war broke out at Okhamandal in 1858 between the local Vaghers and the British. The Vaghers had won the battle and ruled until September 1859. Later, after a joint offensive of the British, the Gaekwads, and other princely state troops, the Vaghers were ousted in 1859. During these operations, led by Colonel Donovan, the temples at Dwarka and Bet Dwarka suffered damage and were looted. A complaint of atrocities by the British was made by the local people of Jamnagar, Porbander, and Kutch, which led to their restoration. In 1861, Dwarakadheesh Temple was renovated by Maharaja Khanderao and the British, who refurbished the shikara. Maharaja Gaikwad of Baroda added a golden pinnacle to the shikara in 1958 during a refurbishment by Shankaracharya of Dwarka. Since 1960, the temple has been maintained by the Government of India.

The Sudama Setu, a bridge over the Gomti River connecting mainland Dwarka with Panchkui island was opened in 2016.

== Geography and climate ==
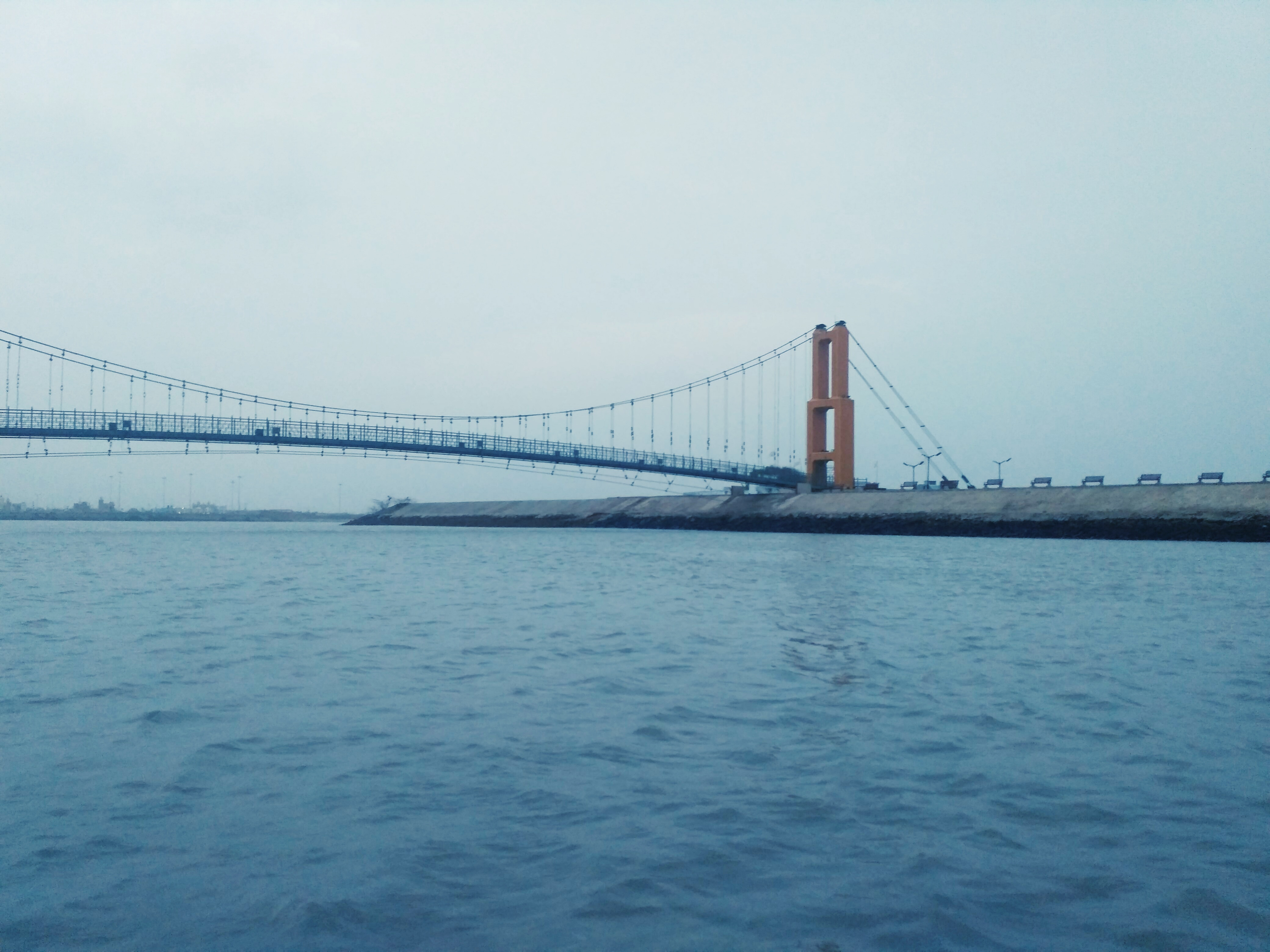
Sudama Setu

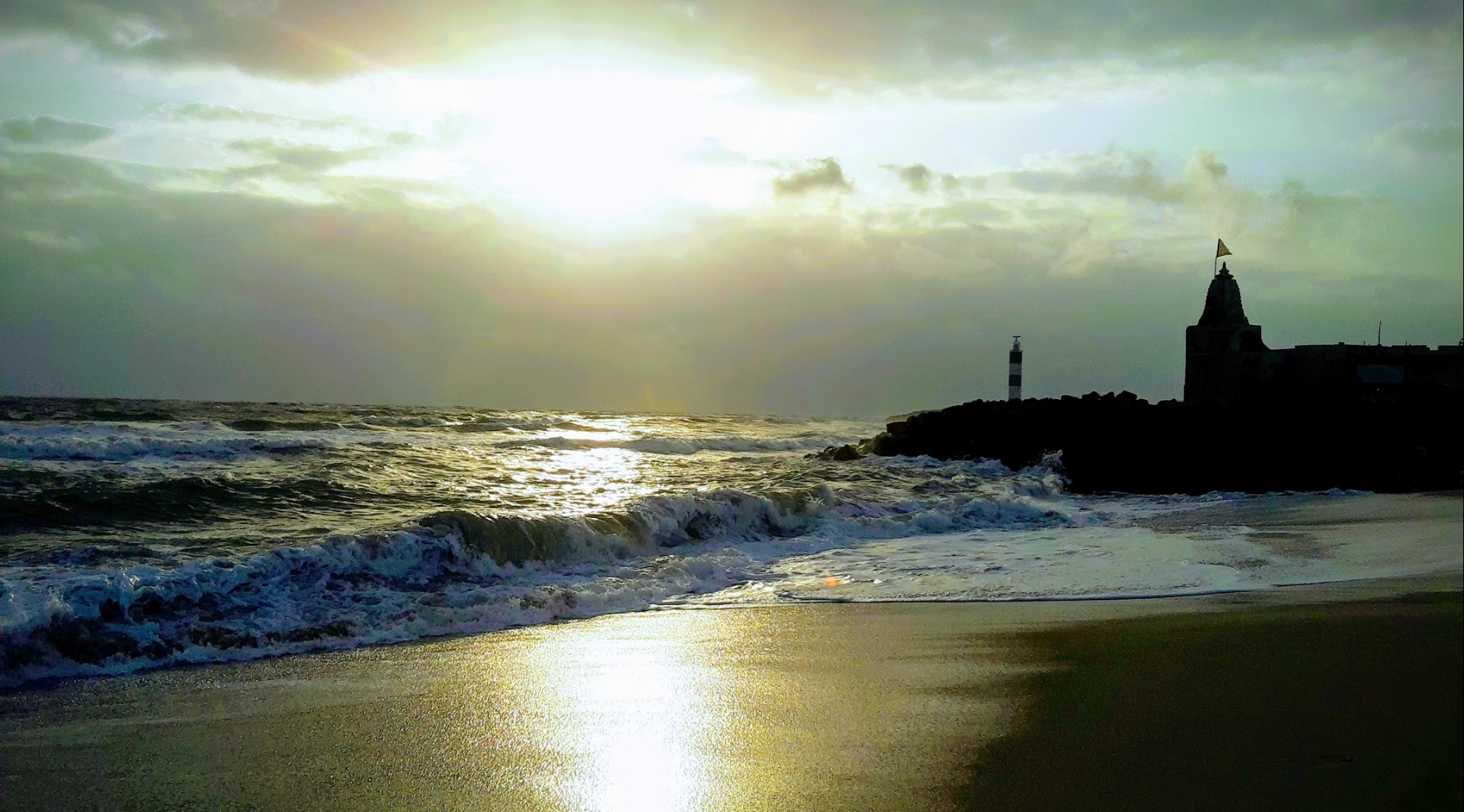
The late evening in the sea shores of Dwarka Beach

=== Geography ===
Dwarka, at the mouth of the Gulf of Kutch, on the western shore of the Okhamandal Peninsula, is on the right bank of the Gomti River which rises from the Bhavda village at a place known as Mul-Gomti, 10 kilometres (6.2 mi) to the east. It is now under the newly formed district of Devbhoomi Dwarka at the western end of the Saurashtra (Kathiawar) peninsula, facing the Arabian Sea. The Gomti River was a harbour until the 19th century.

=== Climate ===
According to the Köppen-Geiger classification, Dwarka has the hot semi-arid climate (BSh) typical of Gujarat, bordering upon a hot arid climate (BWh). The Holdridge life zones system of bio-climatic classification identifies Dwarka in or near the subtropical thorn woodland biome. The “average” annual rainfall is 490 millimetres or 19.3 inches spread over a rainy period of 16 days limited to the months of June to September. However, the variability is among the highest in the world with coefficient of variation of around sixty per cent – among the few comparably variable climates in the world being the Line Islands of Kiribati, the Pilbara coast of Western Australia, the sertão of Northeastern Brazil, and the Cape Verde islands. Extremes of annual rainfall have ranged from as little as 15.0 millimetres or 0.59 inches in 1987 to as much as 1,288.1 millimetres or 50.71 inches in 2010, while as much as 355.8 millimetres or 14.01 inches fell in one day on 2 July 1998.

The average maximum temperature is 30 °C (86 °F) with a record high of 42.7 °C (108.9 °F) and an average minimum temperature of 23.6 °C (74.5 °F) with a minimum of 6.1 °C (43.0 °F); the average annual relative humidity is 72%, with a maximum of 80%.

Climate data for Dwarka (1991–2020, extremes 1901–present)
Month	Jan	Feb	Mar	Apr	May	Jun	Jul	Aug	Sep	Oct	Nov	Dec	Year
Record high °C (°F)	34.0 (93.2)	37.3 (99.1)	38.8 (101.8)	41.1 (106.0)	42.7 (108.9)	39.5 (103.1)	36.4 (97.5)	35.7 (96.3)	39.4 (102.9)	40.0 (104.0)	37.6 (99.7)	35.2 (95.4)	42.7 (108.9)
Mean daily maximum °C (°F)	26.5 (79.7)	27.4 (81.3)	29.0 (84.2)	30.6 (87.1)	32.0 (89.6)	32.7 (90.9)	31.1 (88.0)	30.1 (86.2)	30.7 (87.3)	32.1 (89.8)	31.8 (89.2)	28.6 (83.5)	30.2 (86.4)
Daily mean °C (°F)	21.5 (70.7)	23.0 (73.4)	25.6 (78.1)	27.8 (82.0)	29.7 (85.5)	30.5 (86.9)	29.3 (84.7)	28.2 (82.8)	28.4 (83.1)	28.7 (83.7)	26.8 (80.2)	23.2 (73.8)	26.9 (80.4)
Mean daily minimum °C (°F)	16.3 (61.3)	18.5 (65.3)	22.1 (71.8)	25.2 (77.4)	27.4 (81.3)	28.4 (83.1)	27.5 (81.5)	26.3 (79.3)	26.0 (78.8)	25.2 (77.4)	21.8 (71.2)	17.9 (64.2)	23.5 (74.3)
Record low °C (°F)	6.1 (43.0)	8.3 (46.9)	7.8 (46.0)	17.2 (63.0)	20.0 (68.0)	22.0 (71.6)	21.3 (70.3)	20.6 (69.1)	21.2 (70.2)	16.7 (62.1)	12.2 (54.0)	8.3 (46.9)	6.1 (43.0)
Average rainfall mm (inches)	1.0 (0.04)	1.0 (0.04)	0.6 (0.02)	0.0 (0.0)	0.0 (0.0)	66.5 (2.62)	188.8 (7.43)	141.8 (5.58)	84.4 (3.32)	3.9 (0.15)	2.2 (0.09)	0.5 (0.02)	490.8 (19.32)
Average rainy days	0.1	0.1	0.1	0.0	0.0	2.2	6.6	5.5	2.7	0.5	0.1	0.1	17.9
Average relative humidity (%) (at 17:30 IST)	50	61	71	76	79	79	82	82	79	69	54	48	69
Source 1: India Meteorological Department
Source 2: Tokyo Climate Center (mean temperatures 1991–2020)

== Demographics ==
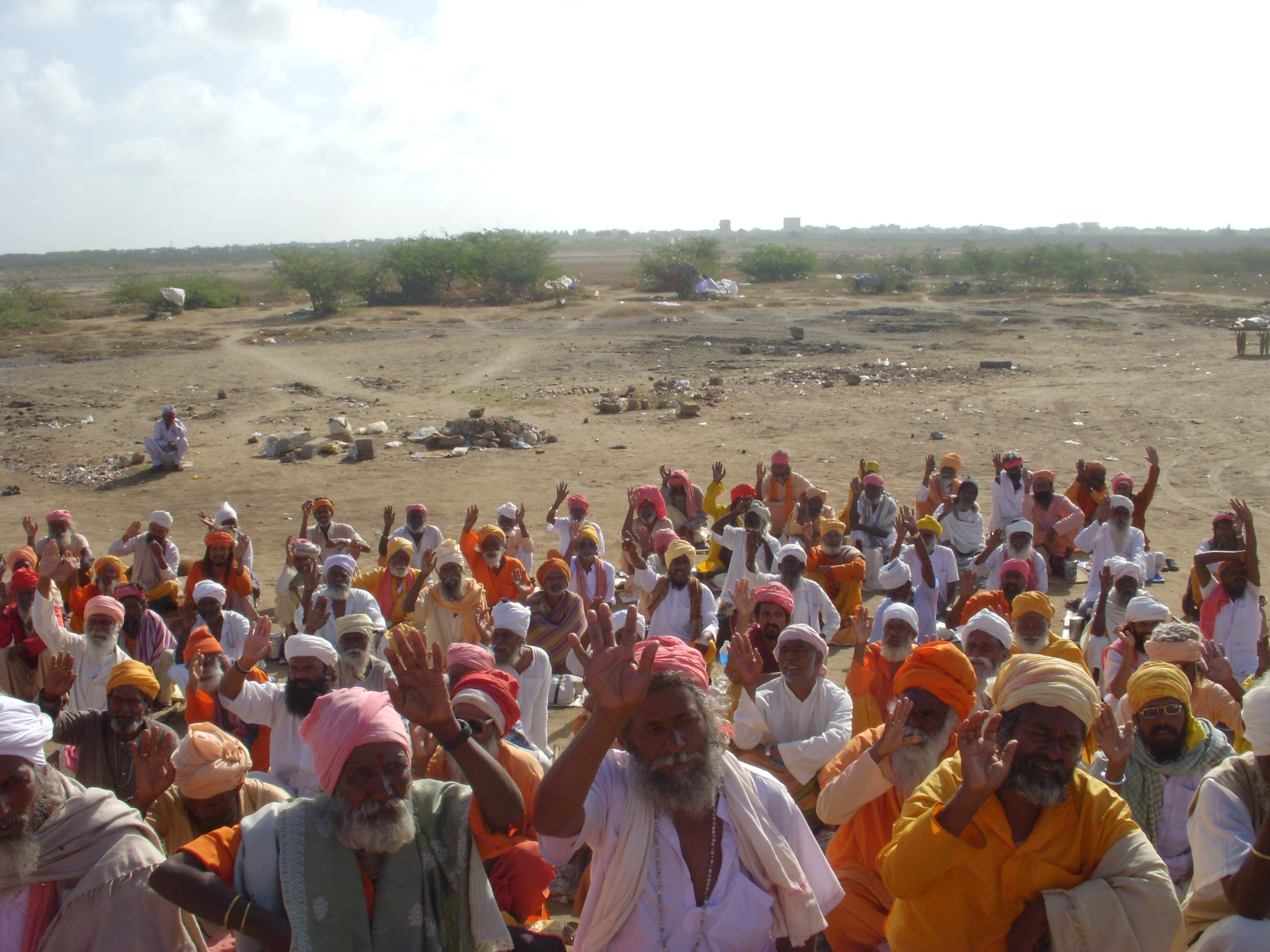
Pilgrims at Rukmani Temple

As of the 2011 Census of India, Dwarka had a population of 38873 (as per Census 2011, the population reported is 38,873). Males constitute 20,306 of the population, and females constitute 18,567. Dwarka has an average literacy rate of 75.94%, lower than the national average of 78.03%; the male literacy rate is 83%, and the female literacy rate is 68.27%. 11.98% of the population is under six years of age.

== Economy ==
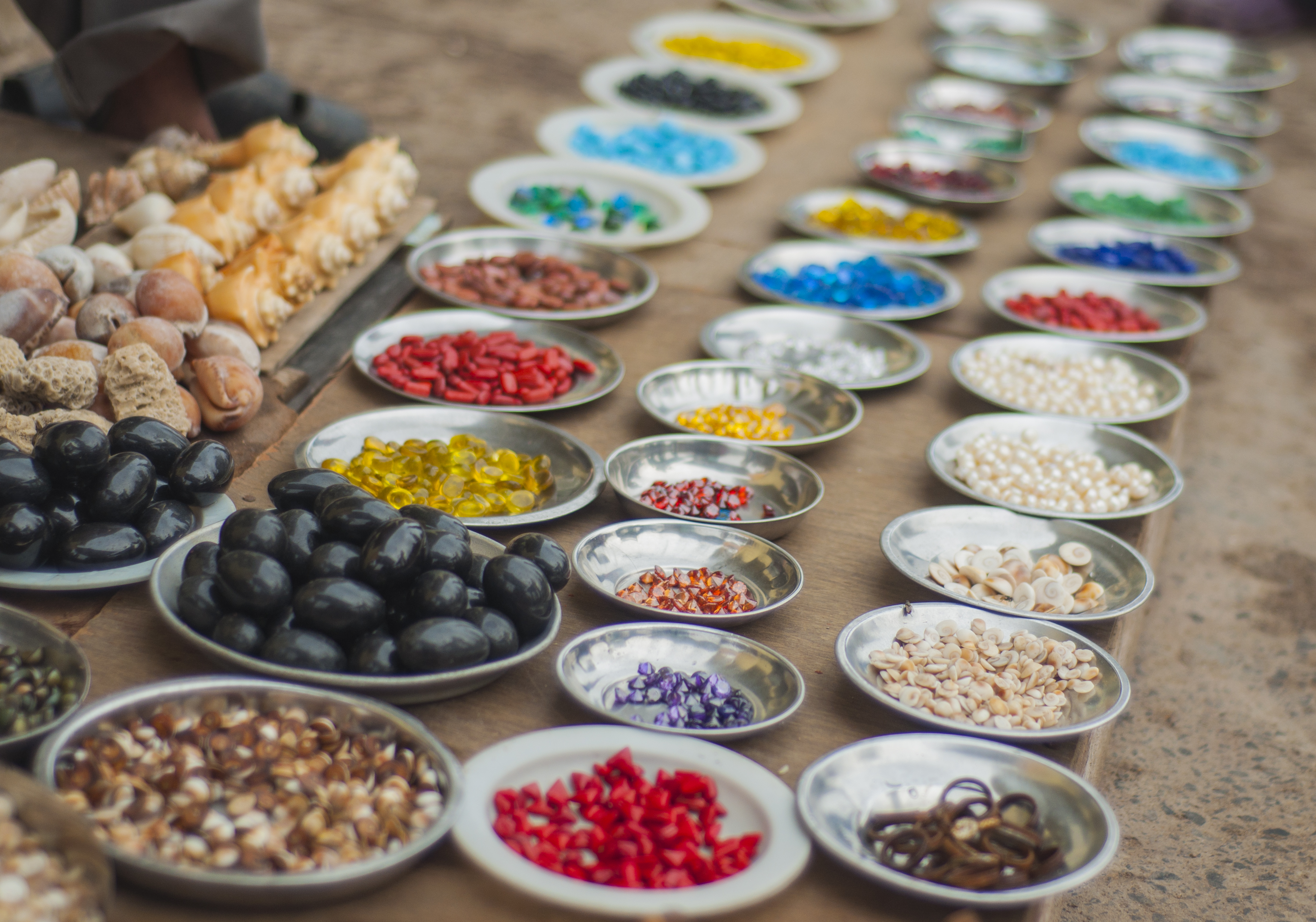
A street vendor's wares in Dwarka

Most of the revenue of Dwarka is derived from tourism, due to it being a site for pilgrims. It is a producer of agricultural produce such as millets, ghee (clarified butter), oilseeds, and salt, which are transported from its port. A long-term development plan was proposed in 2011 with investment of ₹830 million (US$8.6 million) to refurbish Dwarka and to build a bridge connecting the town with Okha and Bet Dwarka. A wind farm power generation of 39.2 MW, operated near Dwarka by the AES Saurashtra Windfarms Pvt Ltd (ASW), is now run by Tata Power Renewable Energy Ltd (TPREL). Dwarka's industrial activity mainly centres around cement production. Sharda Peeth Vidya Sabha is an educational society sponsored by the Sharda Peeth, Dwarka which runs an arts college in Dwarka.

== Tourism ==
Dwarka, renowned as one of the Char Dham pilgrimage sites and a significant spiritual hub, attracts numerous tourists and devotees annually.

=== Submarine-based underwater tourism ===
In December 2023, the Government of Gujarat announced the introduction of India's first submarine-based underwater tourism facility in Dwarka, to be operationalised by October 2024. This initiative, in collaboration with Mazagon Dock shipbuilders, aims to offer an underwater exploration of the marine life around Dwarka. The project plans to use submarines capable of descending to 100 meters below sea level, each accommodating 24 tourists along with two pilots and crew. The submarines are designed to provide passengers with a view of the underwater environment.

== Landmarks ==
=== Temples ===
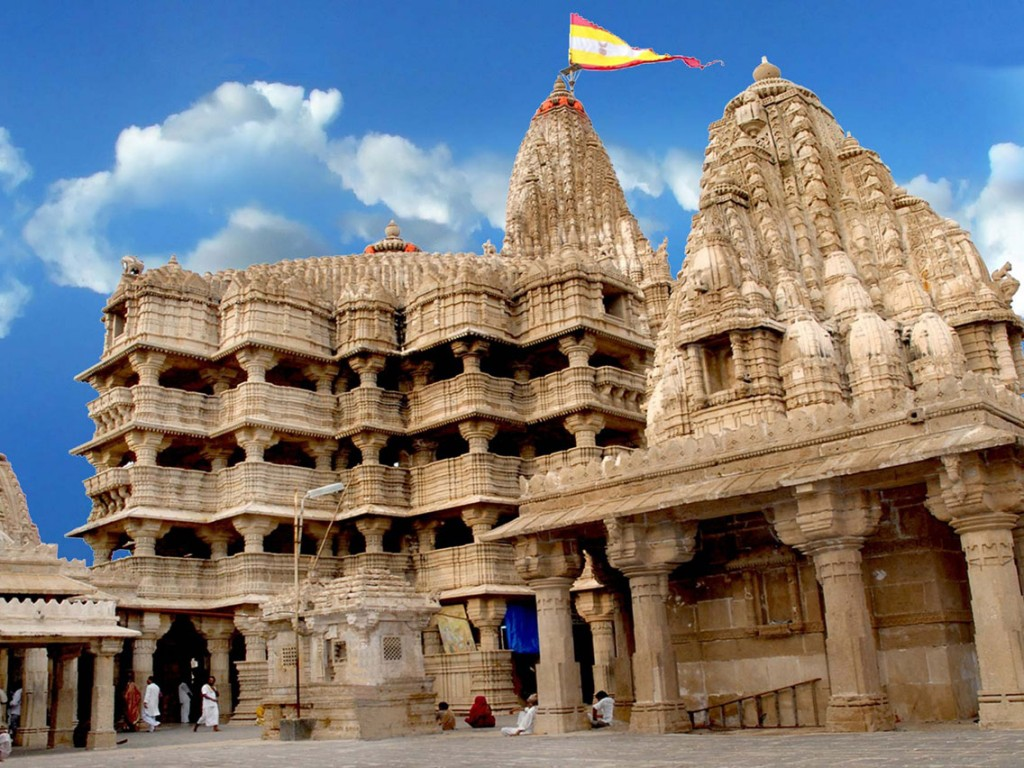
Dwarakadhisa Temple

Considered a holy city, Dwarka is well known for its temples and as a pilgrimage centre for Hindus. The Dwarakadhisa Temple, also called Jagat Mandir, located in the heart of Dwarka, is a Vaishnava temple. It was built by Raja Jagat Singh Rathore, hence it is called Jagat Mandir. The temple, facing west, is at an elevation of 12.19 metres (40.0 ft) above mean sea-level. It is conjectured that this temple location is 2,500 years old and is where Krishna built his city and a temple. However, the existing temple is dated to the 16th century. It is a five-storied edifice built over 72 pillars (a sandstone temple with 60 pillars is also mentioned). The temple spire rises to a height of 78 metres (256 ft), and a very large flag with symbols of the sun and moon is hoisted on it. The temple layout consists of a garbhagriha (Nijamandira or Harigraha) and an antarala (an antechamber). The main deity deified in the sanctum is Dwarkadeesh, which is known as the Trivikrama form of Vishnu and is depicted with four arms.

The Dwarakadhisa Temple is also the location of Dvaraka Pitha, also called Sharada Matha/Peeth and "western peeth"), one of the four peeths (Sanskrit: "religious center") established by Adi Shankaracharya.

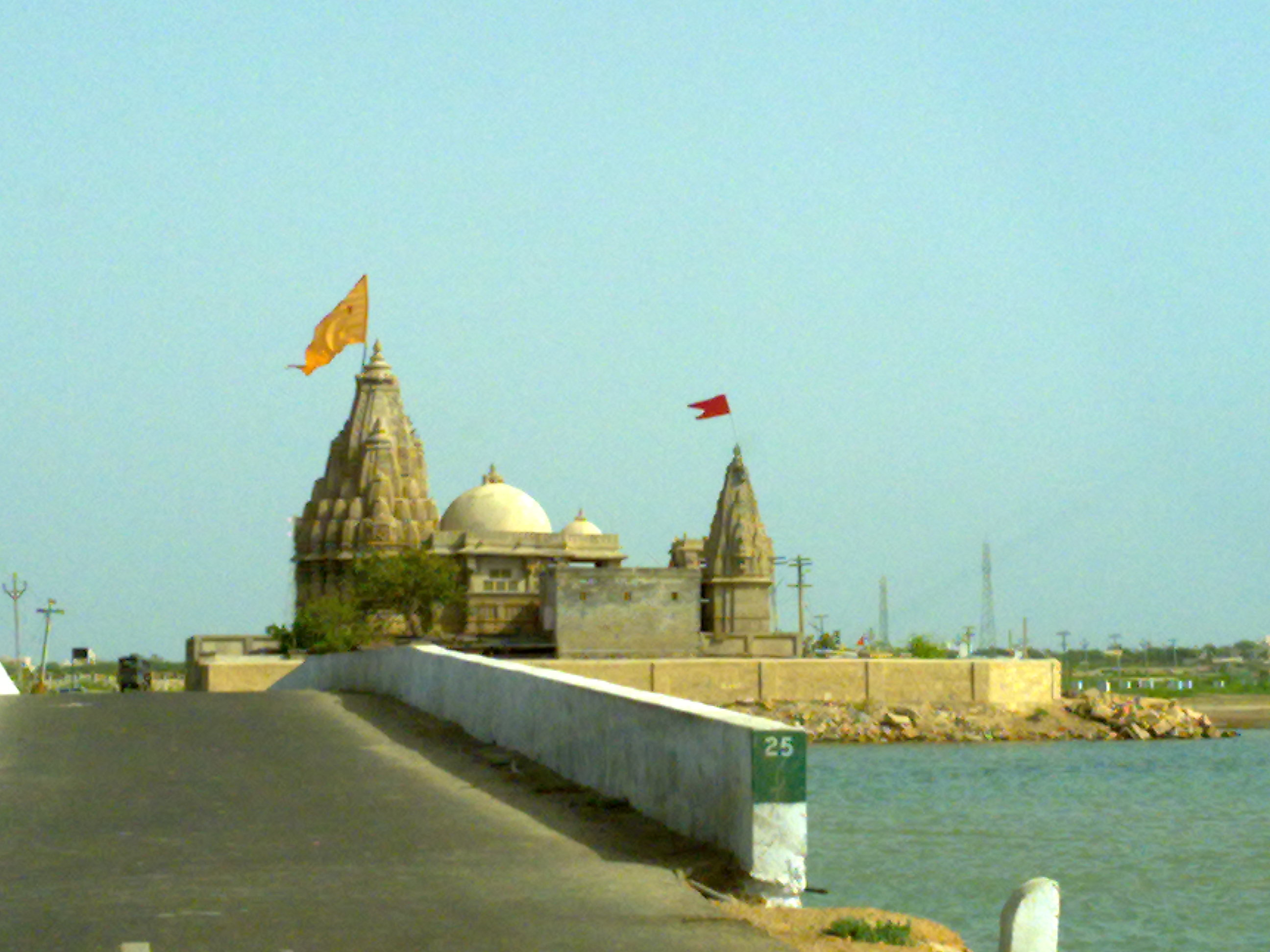
Rukmini Devi Temple

Gomti Ghat consists of steps leading to the Gomti River, which is also a holy place for pilgrims to take a dip in the river, before visiting Dwarakadish temple. The ghat has a number of small shrines dedicated to the Samudra (God of the Sea), Saraswati and Lakshmi. Other notable temples in the ghat area include the Samudra Narayana (Sangam Narayana) temple, which is at the confluence of the Gomti River with the sea, the Chakra Narayana temple where there is a stone with an imprint of a chakra as a manifestation of Vishnu, and the Gomati temple, which has an idol of the river goddess Gomati that is said to have been brought to earth by the sage Vasishta.

The Rukmini Devi Temple, dedicated to Rukmini, Krishna's chief queen, is located 2 kilometres (1.2 mi) away from Dwarka. The temple is said to be 2,500 years old, but in its present form it is estimated to belong to the 12th century. It is a richly carved temple decorated with sculptures of gods and goddesses on the exterior with the sanctum housing the main image of Rukmini. Carved naratharas (human figures) and carved gajatharas (elephants) are depicted in panels at the base of the tower.

Letitia Elizabeth Landon's poetical illustration The Sacred Shrines of Dwarka., to an engraving of William Purser's painting shown above (painting of the late 1820s), says little of the temples themselves but does advocate and praise religious tolerance. It was published in Fisher's Drawing Room Scrap Book, 1837.

=== Nagesvara Jyotirlinga ===
Ancient Shiva temple, Nagesvara Jyortirlinga, one of the 12 Jyotirlingas and only 16 km from Dwarkadhish Temple.

=== Lighthouse and lake ===
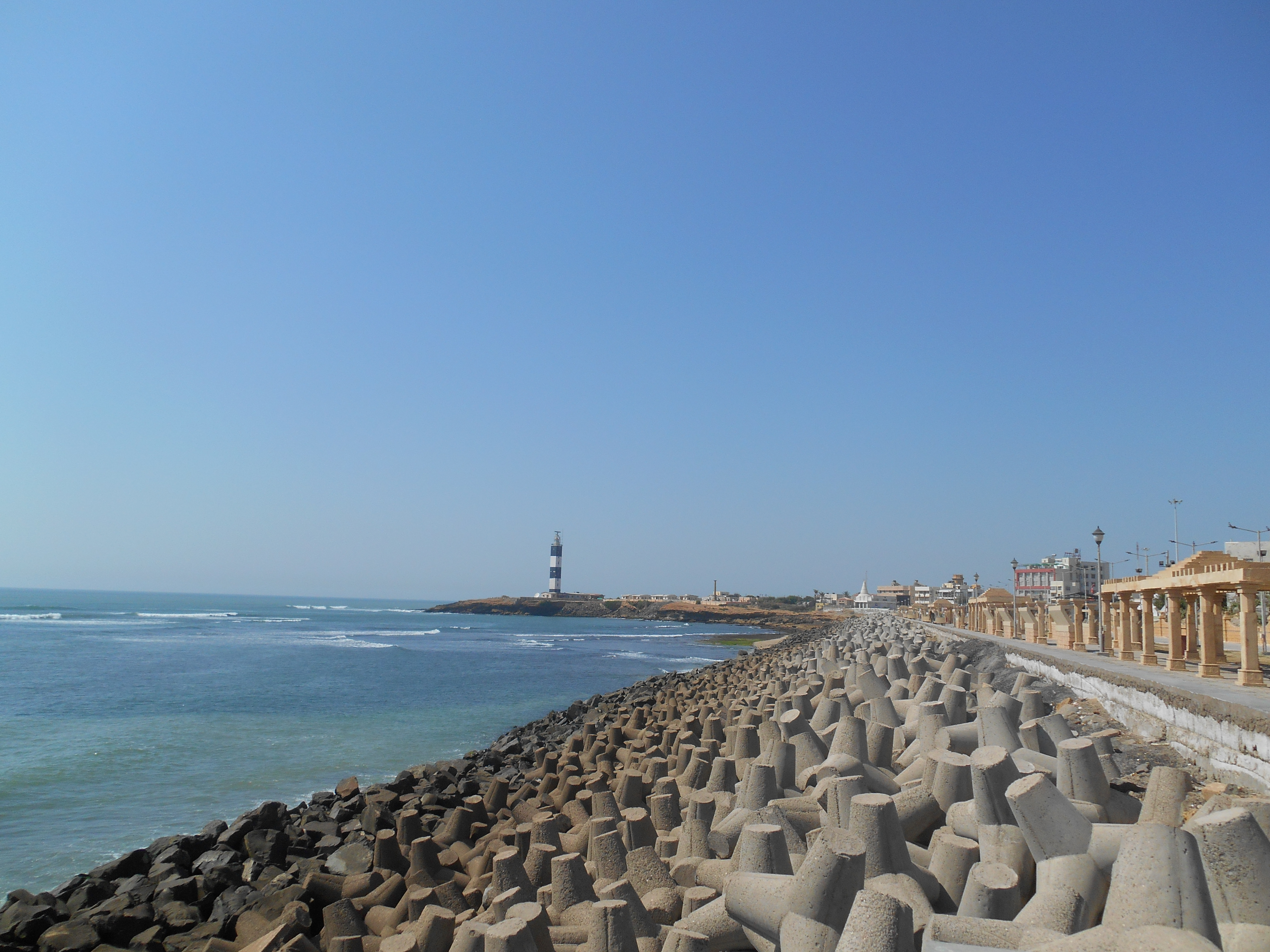
Lighthouse at the Dwarka Point

There is a lighthouse at the Dwarka Point on the Dwarka peninsula, which provides a panoramic view of the town. It is a fixed light situated 70 feet (21 m) above the sea level, and the light is visible over a distance of 10 miles (16 km). The lighthouse tower is 40 feet (12 m) in height and is 117 yards (107 m) away from the high water level in the sea. The radio beacon provided on this lighthouse tower is powered by a solar photovoltaic module.

There is a lake or tank called Gopi Talab in the western part of Dwarka.

A similar lake known for Gopi Chandan, meaning "sandal paste from Gopi", is situated in Bet Dwarka; this mud is found in the bed of the lake. This fragrant mud is applied as a sanctity symbol by devout Hindus on their forehead.

=== Bet Dwarka ===
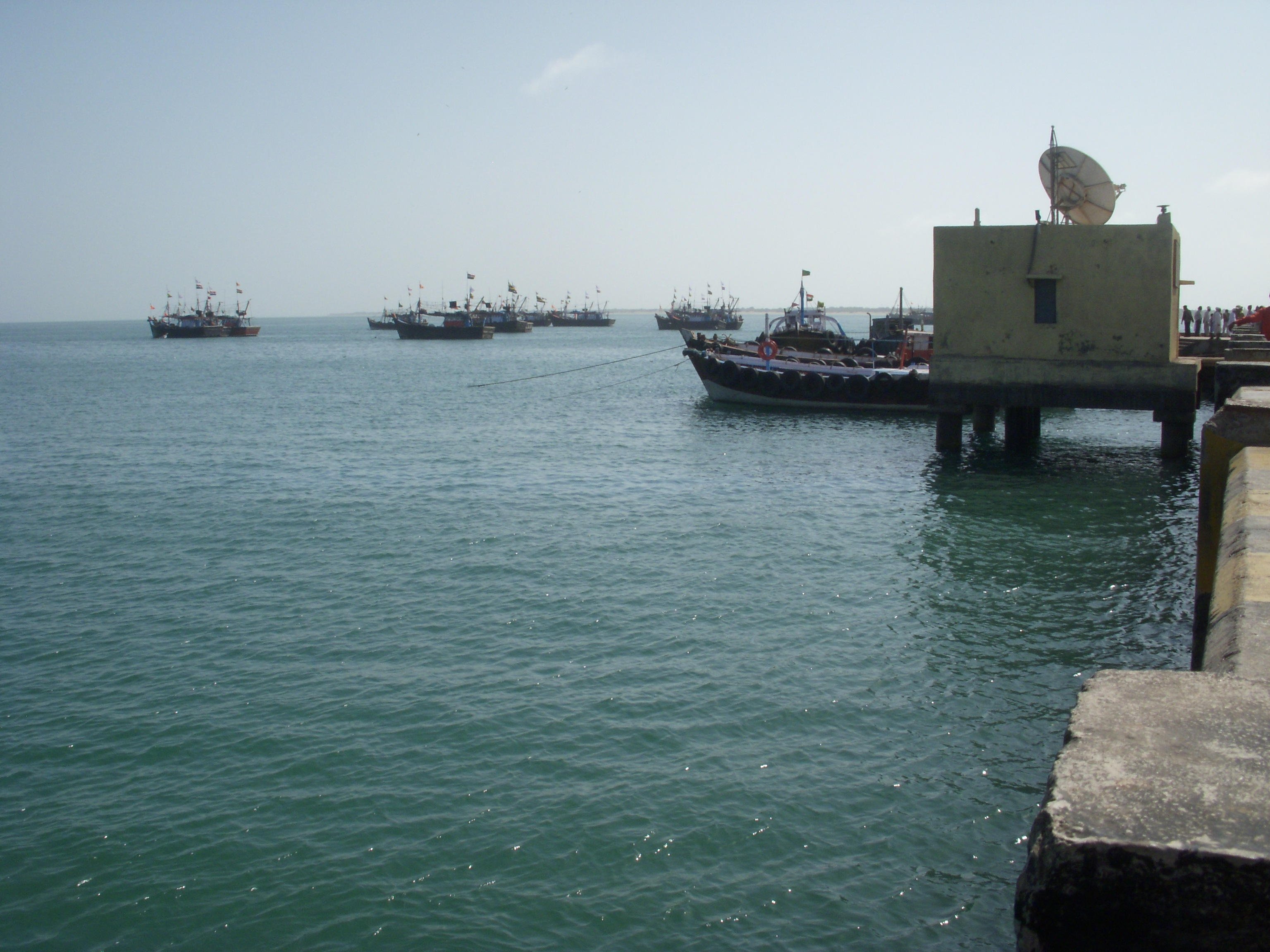
Bet Dwarka coast

Bet Dwarka, an island in the Arabian sea off the coast of Dwarka. Considered the original residence of Krishna, Bet Dwarka was the old port during the ancient times of Krishna before the Okha port was developed in Dwarka. The temple built here is credited to the religious Guru Vallabhacharya of the "Pushtimarg Sampradaya". Rice is the traditional offering here to the deity as it is believed that Sudama offered rice to his childhood friend Krishna. There are also smaller shrines on Bet Dwarka which are dedicated to Shiva, Vishnu, Hanuman and Devi. According to a legend, Vishnu killed the demon Shankhasura on this island. There are temples of Vishnu in the incarnation of matsya, or fish. Other shrines here are of Rukmini, Trivikrama, Devaki, Radha, Lakshmi, Satyabhama, Jambavati, Lakshmi Narayan, and many other gods. Sudarshan Setu, a bridge connecting the land to Bet Dwarka, facilitates access to the island.

Hanuman Dandi temple is another notable temple located in Bet Dwarka, 6 kilometres (3.7 mi) away from Dwarkadhish Temple, Bet Dwarka. The temple is deified with many images of Hanuman and his son Makardhwaja. The legend associated with the birth of a son to Hanuman, who is considered celibate, is that the sweat of Hanuman was consumed by a crocodile which then gave birth to a son named Makardhwaja. The Jethwa Rajput clan of Kshatriyas claim their descent from Makardhwaja.

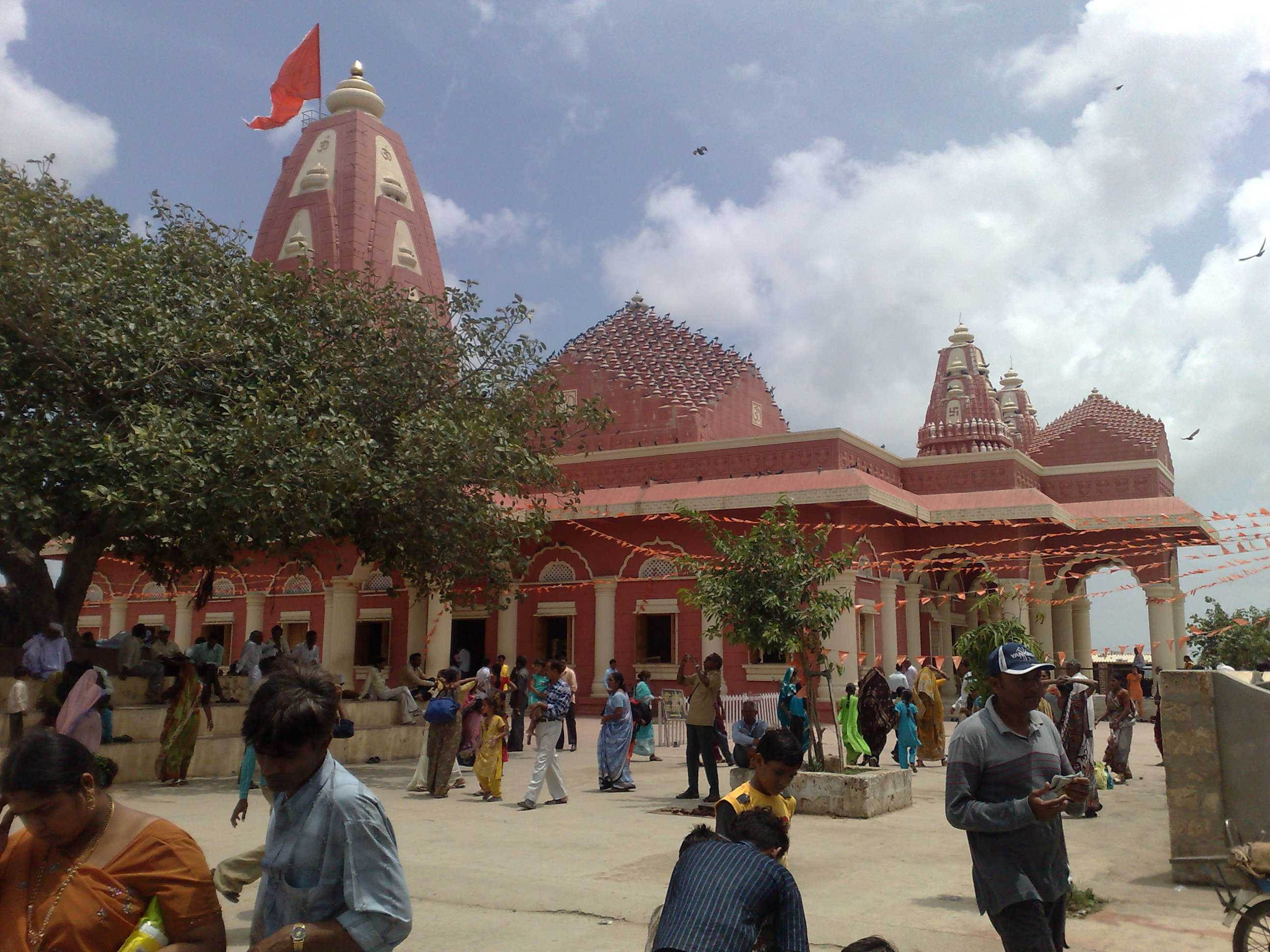
Nageshwar Mandir

Nageshvara Jyotirlinga Mandir is a temple dedicated to Shiva, and one of the twelve Jyotirlingas (meaning “pillars of light") is deified here in a subterranean cell.

=== Shivrajpur Beach ===
Shivrajpur Beach is 14.5 km (approx. 8.8 miles) from Dwarka Railway Station and is among eight Indian beaches to get the prestigious Blue Flag beach certification.

== Culture and sports ==
=== Culture ===
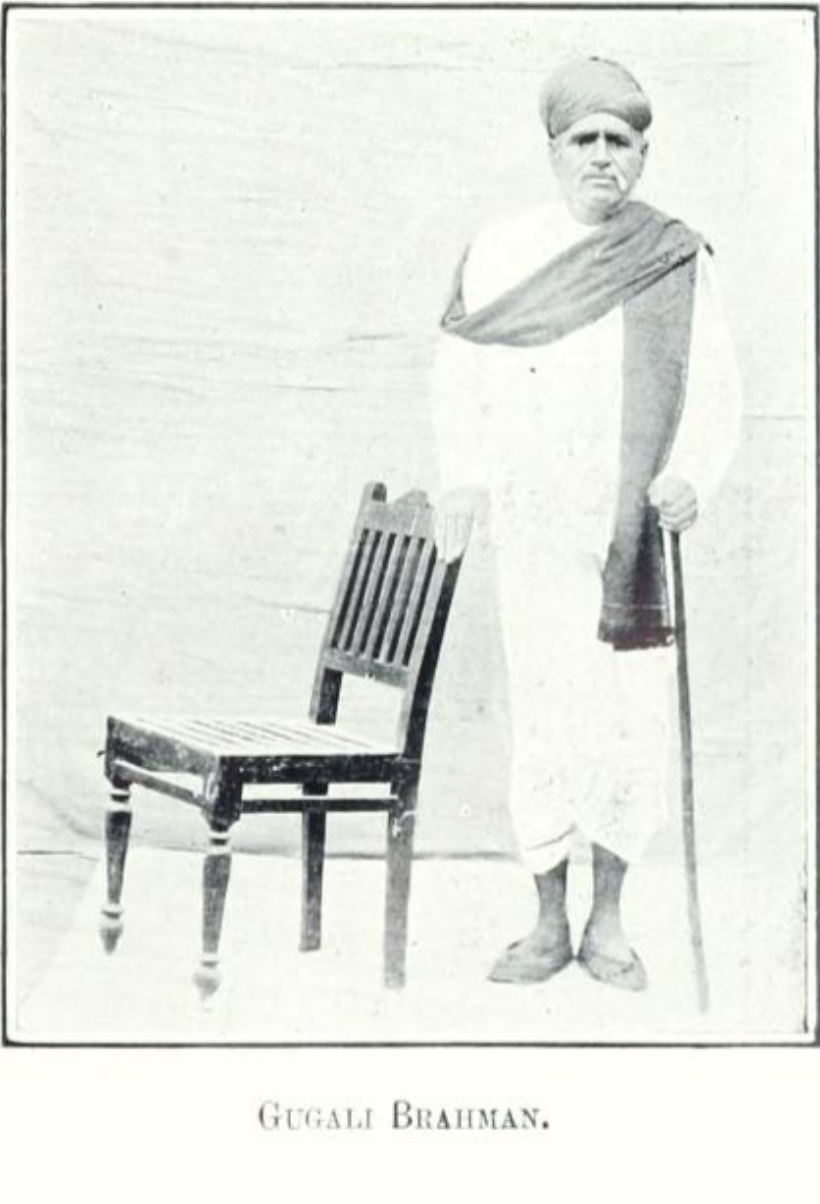
Photograph of a Gugali Brahmin, 1911

Janmashtami is the main festival that is celebrated during the months of August and September with great fervor and piety as it is believed to be the abode of Lord Krishna in prehistoric times. The festival is marked by several night long celebrations to mark the birth of Krishna. Bhajans and sermons are part of the festivities. At midnight there is reenactment of Krishna's childhood in the form of Garba and Raas dances. On this occasion, the local boys create a pyramid and a young boy in the costume of Krishna climbs up this pyramid to strike a pot holding butter, an act which Krishna had mischievously performed with the gopis. This is also known as "Dahi Handi" or Utlotsavam.

Sharda Peeth Vidya Sabha is an educational society sponsored by the Sharda Peeth, which runs an arts college in Dwarka. The town is also home to Great Mission Public School, N.D.H. High School and P.V.M Girls' High School.

The Gugli Brahmins are the hereditary pilgrimage priests of Dwarka.

== Transportation ==
Dwarka is well-connected by road, rail and air to cities across the country.

=== Train ===
Dwarka railway station is a fairly busy railway junction station of Western Railways and is served by numerous regional and long-distance trains. It connects the city with major cities of state and the country. A weekly train service connects Guwahati, Rameswaram, Puri, Tuticorin, Dehradun and Kolkata. A daily trains connects the city to major cities in Gujarat such as Ahmedabad, Bhavnagar, Jamnagar, Junagadh, Rajkot, Surat, Vadodara and Veraval.

=== Air ===
Nearest Airport is Jamnagar Airport at 131 km which has a daily direct flight to Mumbai and thrice-in-a-week flights to Hyderabad and Bengaluru.

=== Road ===
217 kilometres (135 mi) away from Rajkot, 235 km from Somnath and 378 kilometres (235 mi) from Ahmedabad.

== See also ==
- Nageshvara Jyotirlinga
- Somnath Temple

== Bibliography ==
- Bandyopadhyay, Deepak (11 June 2014). Hinduism. Rupa Publications India Pvt. Ltd 2014. ISBN 978-81-291-3428-8.
- Bansal, Sunita Pant (1 January 2008). Hindu Pilgrimage. Pustak Mahal. ISBN 978-81-223-0997-3.
- Brockman, Norbert (13 September 2011). Encyclopedia of Sacred Places. ABC-CLIO. ISBN 978-1-59884-655-3.
- Desai, Anjali H. (2007). India Guide Gujarat. India Guide Publications. ISBN 978-0-9789517-0-2.
- Deshpande, Aruna (2005). India: A Divine destination. Crest Publishing House. ISBN 81-242-0556-6.
- Dharaiya, Ramanlal Kakalbhai (1970). Gujarat in 1857. Gujarat University.
- Findlay, Alexander George (1876). A Directory for the Navigation of the Indian Ocean: With Descriptions of Its Coasts, Islands, Etc., from the Cape of Good Hope to the Strait of Sunda and Western Australia : Including Also the Persian Gulf, the Winds, Monsoons, and Currents, and the Passages from Europe to Its Various Ports. Richard Holmes Laurie.
- Kapoor, Subodh (2002). The Indian Encyclopaedia. Cosmo Publications. ISBN 978-81-7755-257-7.
- nn (1964), Śāradā pīṭha pradīpa, Volumes 4-6, Indological Research Institute, Dwārka
- Paramāra, Thomasa (1996). Temples of Gujarat Built During the Mughal Period. Thomas B. Parmar.
- Sah, S. L. (1 January 1995). Renewable and Novel Energy Sources. M.D. Publications Pvt. Ltd. ISBN 978-81-85880-82-2.
- Sen, Sailendra (2013). A Textbook of Medieval Indian History. Primus Books. p. 115. ISBN 978-93-80607-34-4.
- Singh, N.K.; Mishra, A.P. (2010), Global Encyclopaedia of Indian Philosophy, Volume 1, Global Vision Publishing House, ISBN 9788182202948
- Singh, Upinder (2008). A History of Ancient and Early Medieval India: From the Stone Age to the 12th Century. Pearson Education India. ISBN 978-81-317-1677-9.
- Sridharan, K. (1 January 2000). Sea: Our Saviour. Taylor & Francis. ISBN 978-81-224-1245-1.
- Yagnik, Achyut; Sheth, Suchitra (1 January 2005). The Shaping of Modern Gujarat: Plurality, Hindutva, and Beyond. Penguin Books India. ISBN 978-0-14-400038-8.
