= Atal Pedestrian Bridge =

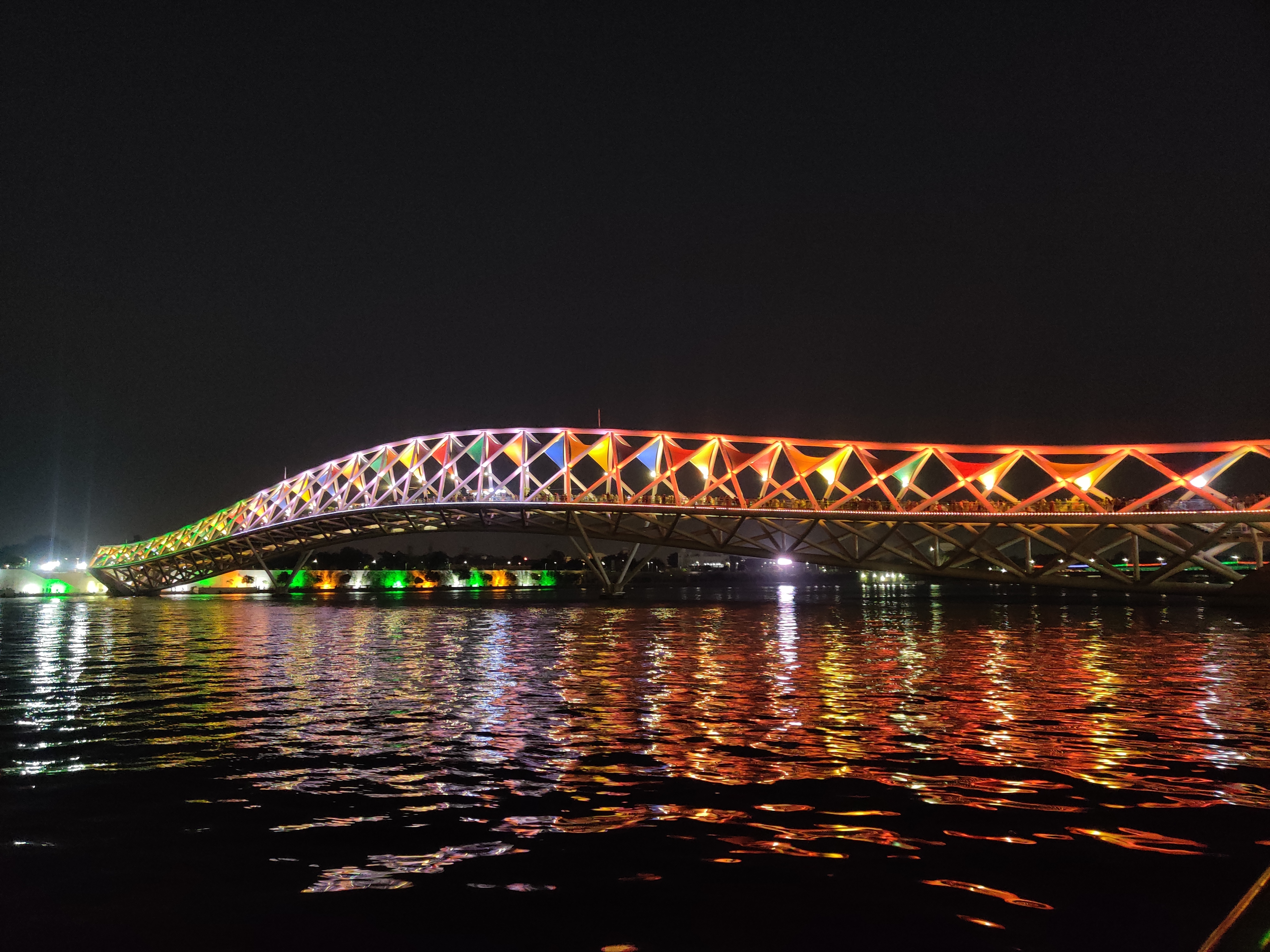
- At night
- Coordinates: 23.01647035°N 72.57544637°E
- Carries: Pedestrians
- Crosses: Sabarmati River
- Locale: Sabarmati Riverfront, Ahmedabad, Gujarat, India
- Other name: Atal Foot Over Bridge
- Named for: Atal Bihari Vajpayee
- Owner: Ahmedabad Municipal Corporation

Characteristics
- Design: Pedestrian truss bridge
- Material: Concrete
- Trough construction: Steel
- Total length: 300 m (984 ft)
- Width: 10 m (33 ft) to 14 m (46 ft)
- Longest span: 100 m (328 ft)
- Piers in water: 4

History
- Successful competition design: STUP Consultants
- Constructed by: P & R Infraprojects Ltd.
- Construction start: 2018
- Construction end: 2022
- Construction cost: ₹74 crore (US$8.8 million)
- Inaugurated: 27 August 2022

Atal Pedestrian Bridge is a pedestrian triangular truss bridge at Sabarmati Riverfront on Sabarmati River in Ahmedabad, Gujarat, India. It has a design inspired by kites. Inaugurated in 2022, it is 300 metres (980 ft) long and 10 metres (33 ft) to 14 metres (46 ft) wide.

== History ==
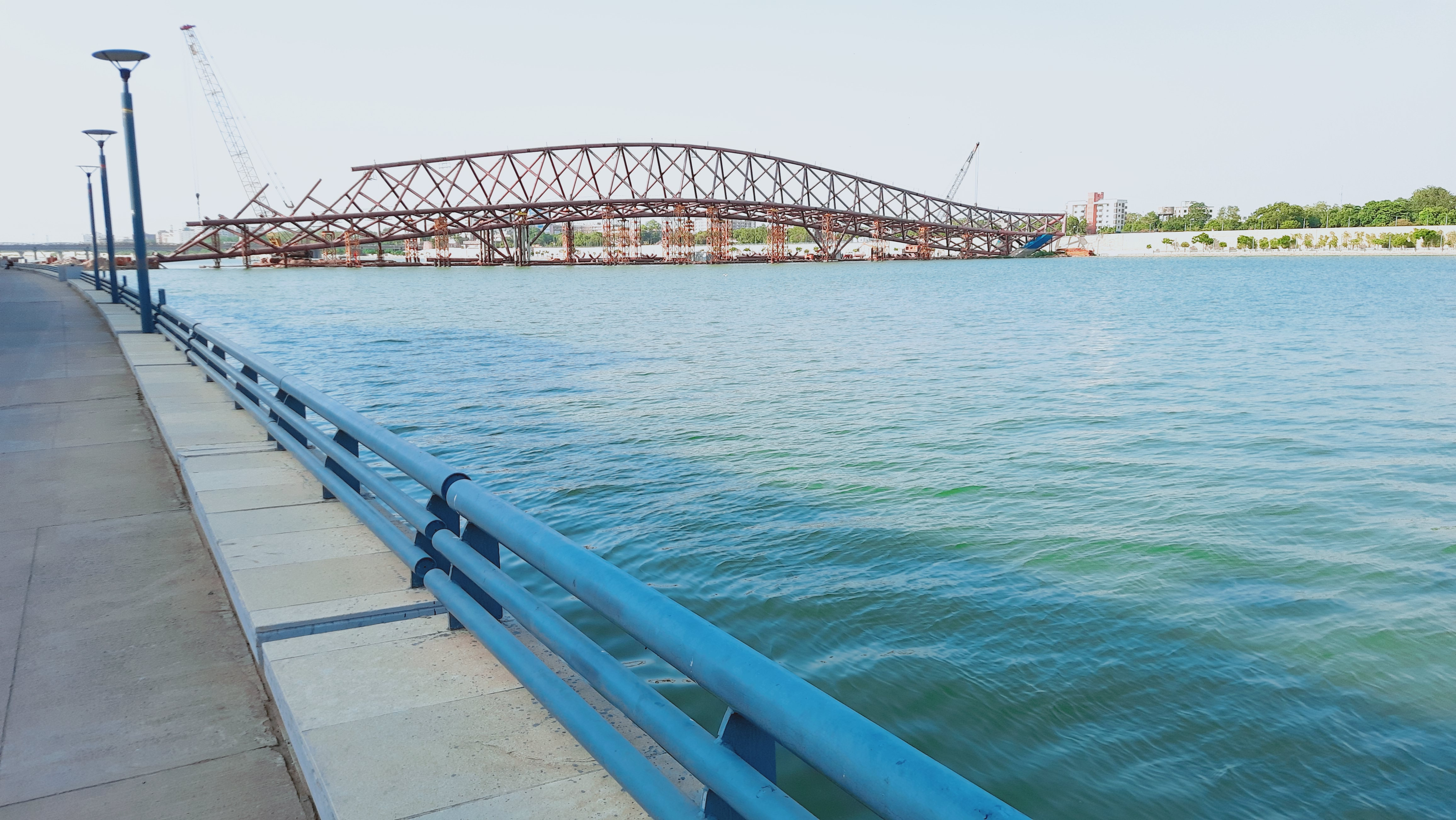
Under construction in June 2021

On 21 March 2018, a steel foot overbridge (pedestrian bridge) was approved by the Sabarmati Riverfront Development Corporation Ltd (SRFDCL) connecting both banks of Sabarmati river, at a cost of ₹74 crore (US$8.8 million). The Ahmedabad Municipal Corporation named it after former Indian Prime Minister Atal Bihari Vajpayee on his birth anniversary on 25 December 2021. The construction was completed by June 2022. On 27 August 2022, it was inaugurated by Prime Minister Narendra Modi.

== Architecture ==
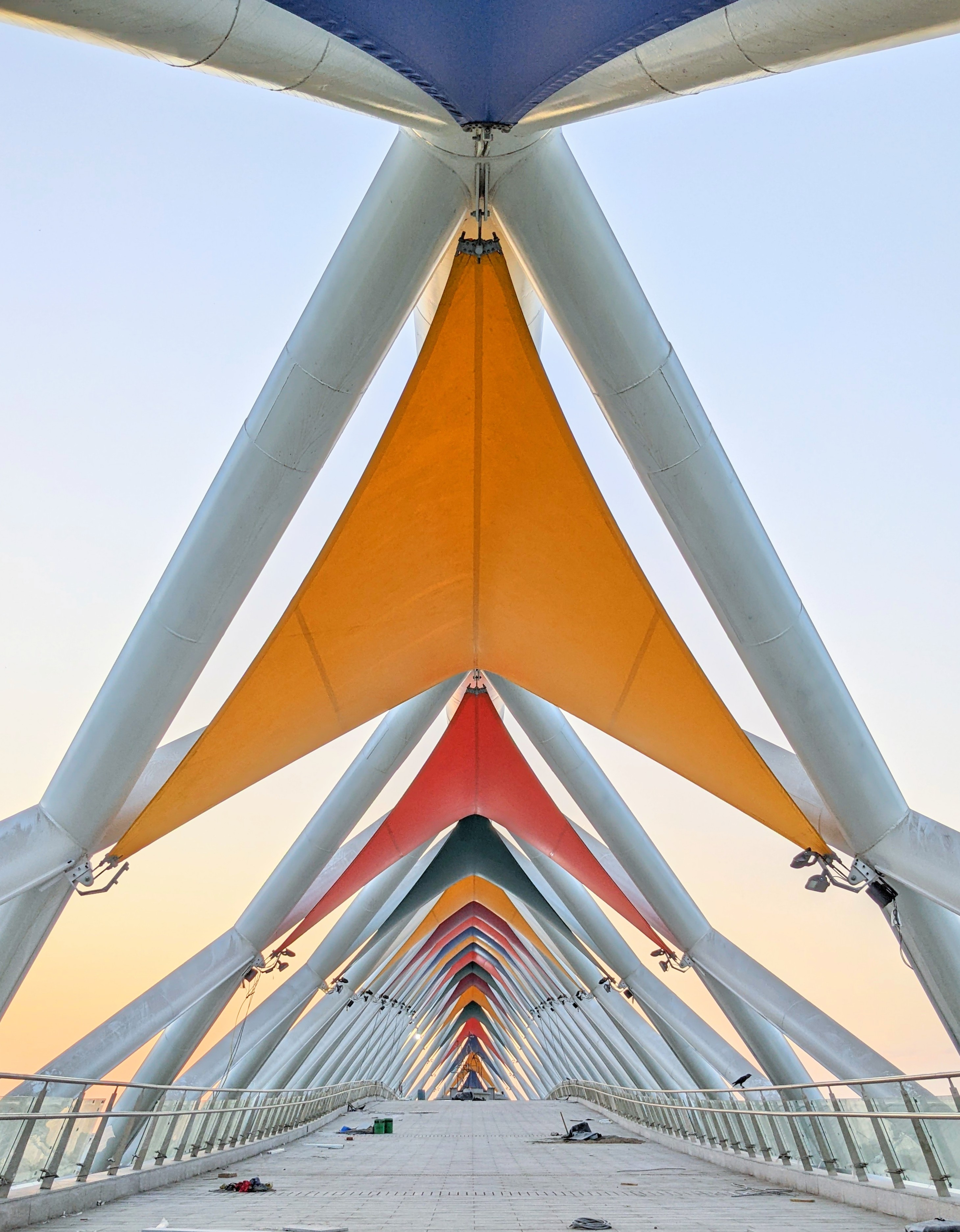
Steel frames and coloured fabric panel shades of the bridge

The bridge is located between Sardar Bridge and Ellis Bridge. It is designed by STUP Consultants Ltd based in Mumbai and built by P&R Infraprojects Ltd.

The design is inspired by kite festival organised in the city.

It is a single span steel truss bridge with two additional foundations. The cross section of the truss has rhombus shape similar to kites. The elevation of the truss gives impression of an arch which is supported on spherical bearings on each end. The depth of the truss varies across the length. The bridge is shaded by colourful fabric panels with colours inspired by kites. They protect people from harsh climate. 2600 metric tonnes of steel pipes were used in its construction. The railings are made of steel and glass. It is lit by LED lights.

It is 300 metres (980 ft) long and 10 metres (33 ft) to 14 metres (46 ft) wide. It features two levels of walkways at each end connecting upper and lower promenades of the Sabarmati riverfront. It connects the flower garden on the west bank to upcoming arts and culture centre on the east bank.

== See also ==
- Amgen Helix Pedestrian Bridge
- Bridge of Peace
- Peace Bridge
- Sudama Setu
- Tabiat Bridge
- Okha–Beyt Dwarka Signature Bridge
