= Sudama Setu =

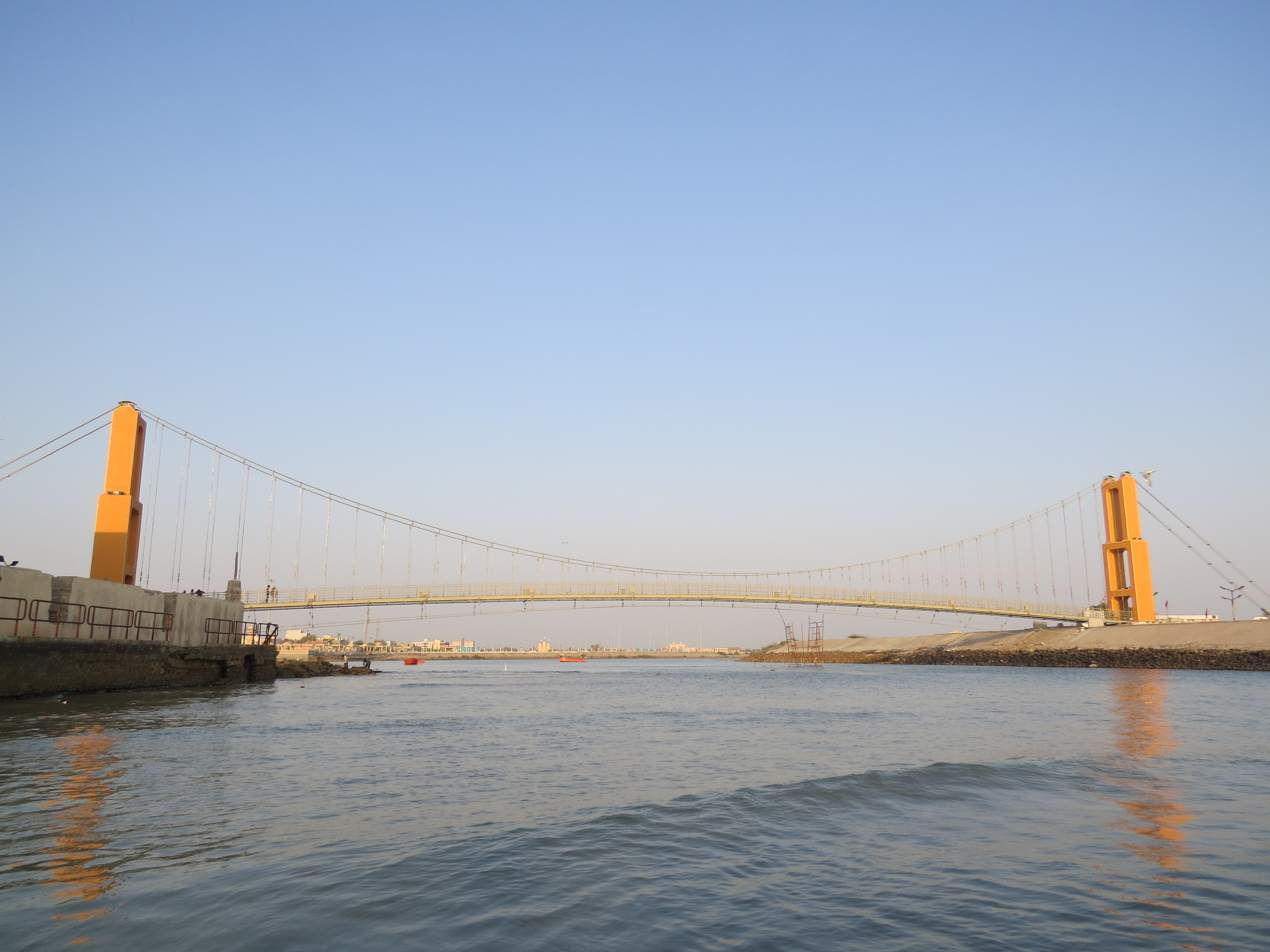
- The bridge connects the temple and island
- Coordinates: 22°14′12″N 68°58′7″E
- Carries: pedestrians
- Crosses: Gomti river
- Locale: Dwarka, Gujarat, India
- Named for: Sudama

Characteristics
- Design: Pedestrian suspension bridge
- Material: Concrete, steel
- Total length: 166 m (545 ft)
- Width: 4.2 m (14 ft)
- Piers in water: 2

History
- Engineering design by: PKS Infra Engineers Pvt. Ltd
- Constructed by: Reliance Industries Limited
- Construction start: 5 May 2011
- Construction end: February 2016
- Construction cost: ₹7.42 crore (US$780,000)
- Inaugurated: 11 June 2016
- Closed: October 2022

Location
- Interactive map of Sudama Setu

Sudama Setu is a pedestrian suspension bridge in Dwarka, Gujarat, India. It is named for Sudama, a childhood friend of Krishna. Proposed in 2005, the bridge was opened in 2016. It is closed since 2022.

== History ==
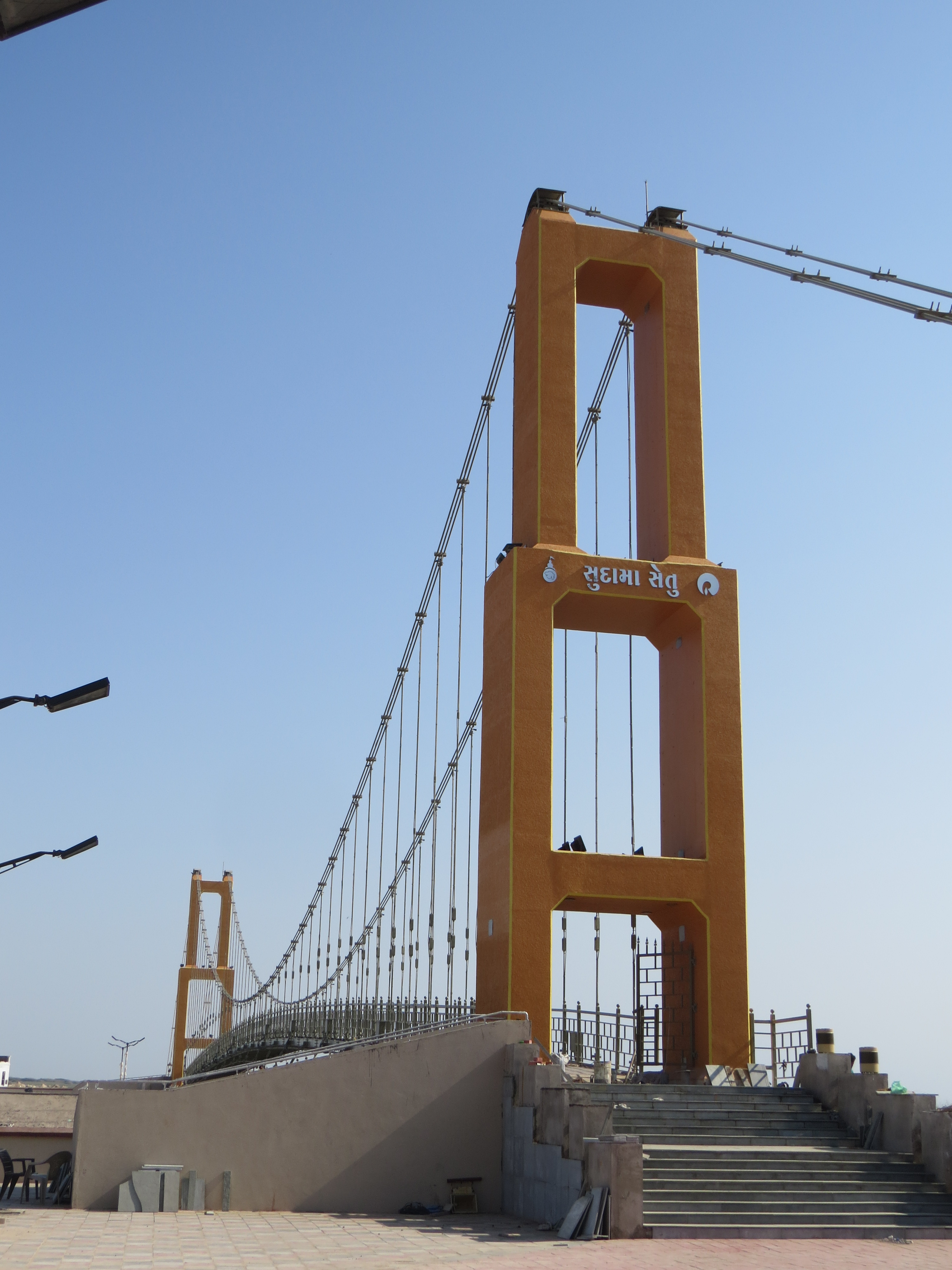
Sudama Setu north end

A pedestrian bridge over Gomti river connects Jagat Mandir of mainland Dwarka and Panchnad or Panchkui Tirth on the island in southeast of it. The bridge was proposed in 2005 to boost tourism on the island. The island has religious as well archaeological significance. There are five sweet water wells called Panchkui associated with five Pandava brothers of Mahabharata. Gomti river was crossed by boats until construction of the bridge. As Jagat Mandir is an Archaeological Survey of India (ASI) protected site, permission was needed for construction of the bridge. The Vadodara circle of ASI gave a nod to the bridge in 2008. The ground breaking ceremony for the bridge was held on 5 May 2011 by Gujarat Tourism minister Jaynarayan Vyas and Rajya Sabha MP Parimal Nathwani. The construction was delayed due to ASI Delhi not granting the permit until 2013. The bridge was completed in February 2016.

Reliance Industries Limited, in collaboration with the Gujarat Tourism Department and Gujarat Pavitra Yatradham Vikas Board, built the bridge. The bridge cost ₹7.42 crore (US$780,000). It is named for Sudama, a childhood friend of Krishna. The bridge was inaugurated by Gujarat Chief Minister Anandiben Patel on 11 June 2016. It was closed in October 2022 following the Morbi bridge collapse and remained so. In June 2025, it was declared that it will be renovated at the cost of ₹14.11 crore (US$1.5 million).

== Features ==
The bridge is 166 meters long and 4.2 meters wide, having the capacity to carry 25,000 to 30,000 pedestrians an hour. The bridge is constructed with 40mm locked coil cable ropes provided by Usha Martin Limited.

== See also ==
- Okha–Beyt Dwarka Signature Bridge
- Atal Pedestrian Bridge
