= Rukmini Devi Temple =

Hindu temple in Gujarat, India

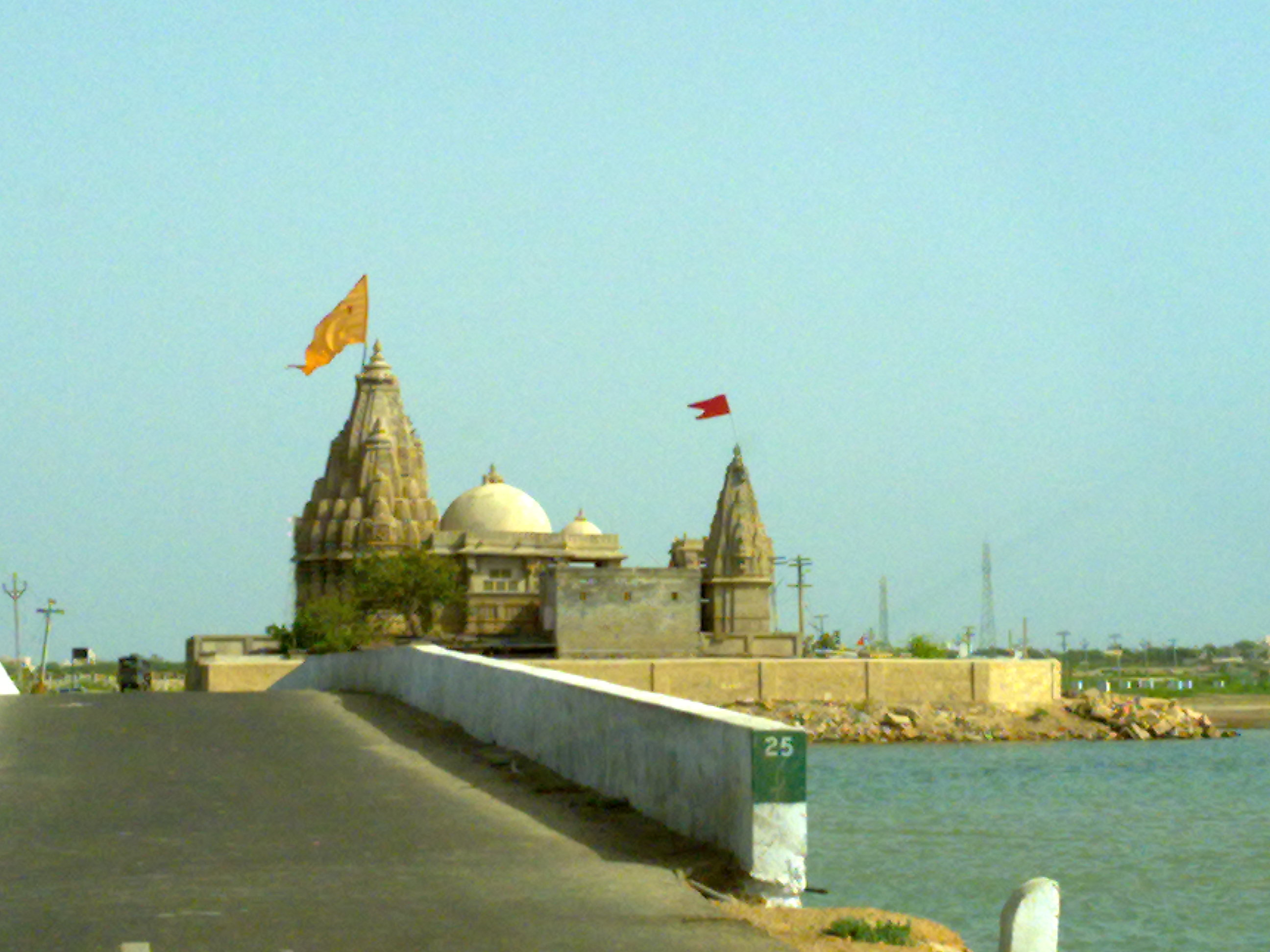

Religion
- Affiliation: Hinduism
- District: Dwarka
- Deity: Rukmini
- Festival: Rukmini Ashtami

Location
- Location: Dwarka
- State: Gujarat
- Country: India
- Interactive map of Rukmini Devi Temple

Architecture
- Style: Nagara Style
- Completed: 19th Century

The Rukmini Devi Temple is a temple in Dwarka, 2 kilometres (1.2 mi) away from Dwarka, Gujarat, India. It is dedicated to goddess Rukmini, the chief queen of Krishna and an incarnation of Lakshmi. The temple is believed to date back to the 5th century BC, though its present form is thought to originate from the 12th century.

It is a richly carved temple decorated with sculptures of gods and goddesses on the exterior with the sanctum housing the main image of Rukmini. Carved naratharas (human figures) and carved gajatharas (elephants) are depicted in panels at the base of the tower.

The present structure of temple is believed to have been built in the 19th century.

The temple is also known for its jal daan (water offering) custom where devotees are asked to donate water to temple.

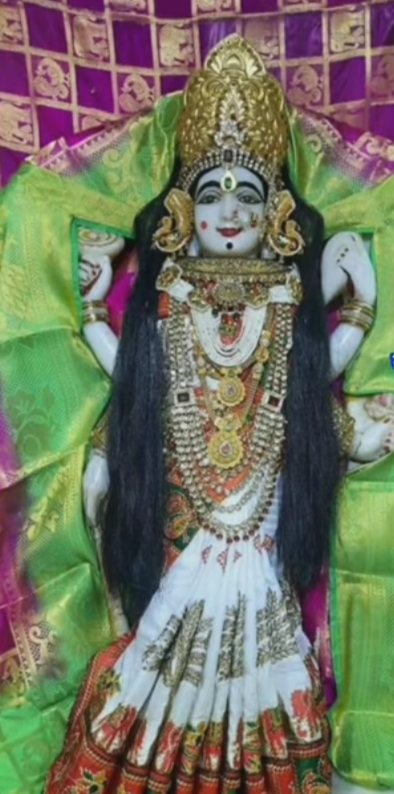
Idol of Rukmini in the sanctum sanctorum

The sanctum of the temple has a marble idol of Rukmini, with her four hands holding the attributes of the shankha, chakra, gada, and padma.

According to local tradition, the pilgrimage to Dwarka is said to be completed only after praying to the goddess of this temple.

== Legends ==
A legend is narrated in the Skanda Purana to justify separate dwelling temples, far away from each other, for Rukmini and her husband Krishna. It is said that at the request of sage Durvasa (who was renowned for his short temper and bestowing curses) Krishna and Rukmini pulled a chariot taking sage Durvasa to their house for dinner. On the way, when Rukmini asked for water to quench her thirst, Krishna drew Ganges water by prodding the ground with his toe for her to drink. Rukmini quenched her thirst with the Ganges water. But Durvasa felt insulted as Rukmini did not offer him water to drink first. He, therefore, cursed her that she would live separately from her husband. Rukmini and Krishna lived apart for 12 years due to Durvasa’s curse. Rukmini spent her time in meditation at this very location of the Rukmini Devi Temple and was able to ware off the curse with her meditation after 12 years with the blessings of Vishnu.
