= Amgen Helix Pedestrian Bridge =

Pedestrian bridge in Seattle, Washington, U.S.

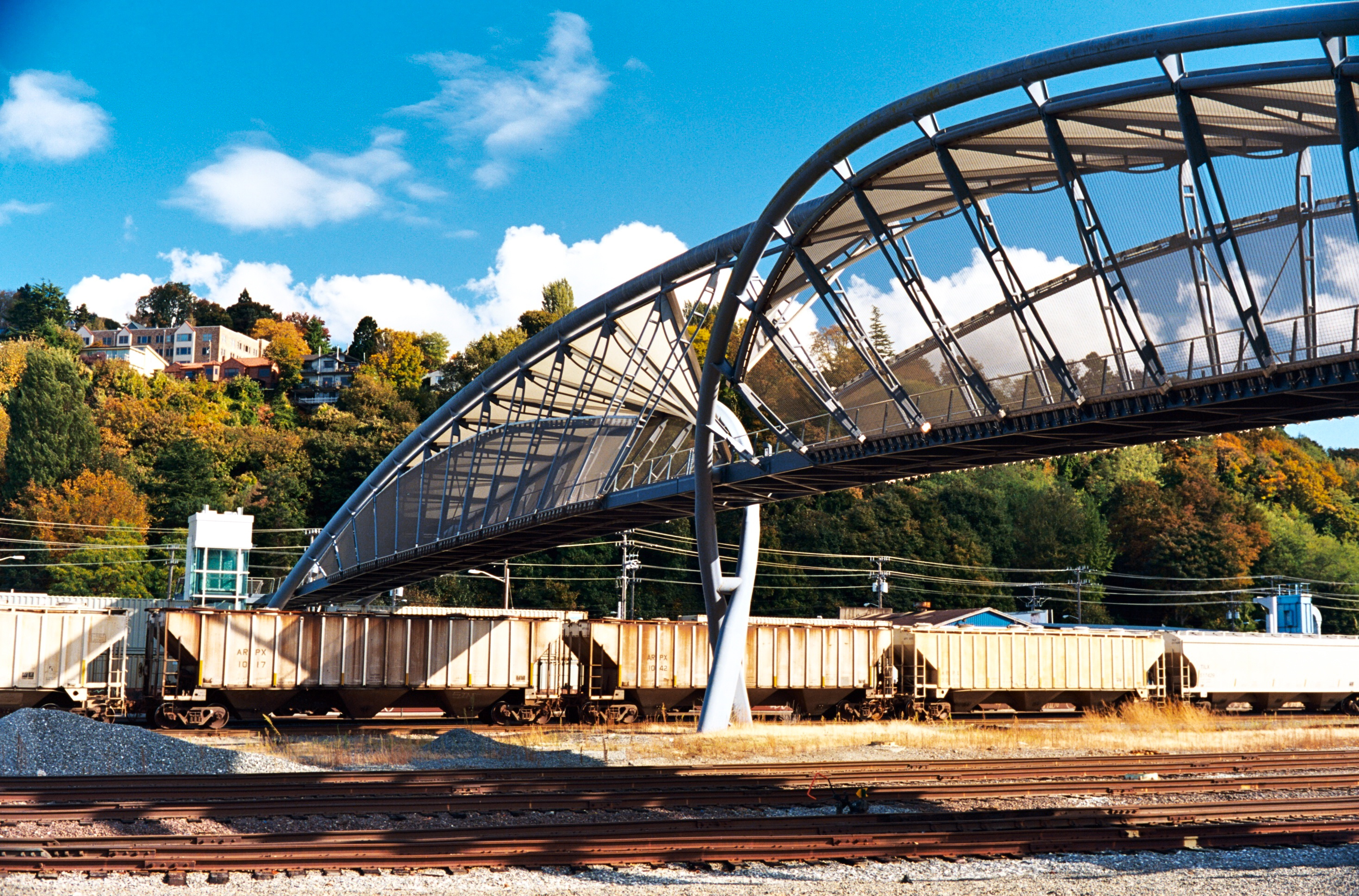
- The bridge in 2012
- Coordinates: 47°37′41″N 122°22′20″W
- Locale: Seattle, Washington, U.S.

The Amgen Helix Pedestrian Bridge is a pedestrian bridge in Seattle, in the U.S. state of Washington. The bridge was designed by Johnson Architecture and KPFF Engineers.
