= Sudama =

Childhood friend of the Hindu god Krishna

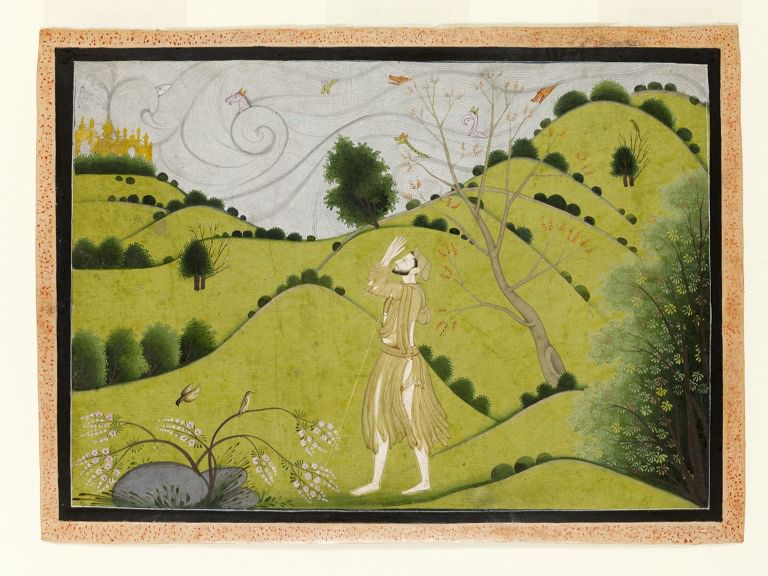
- Sudama bows at the glimpse of Krishna's golden palace in Dvārakā. ca 1775-1790 painting.
- Texts: Puranas

Information
- Affiliation: Devotee of Krishna
- Spouse: Sushila
- Home: Avanti Kingdom

Sudama (Sanskrit: सुदामा, romanized: Sudāmā), also known as Kuchela (Sanskrit: कुचेल, romanized: Kucela), is a childhood friend of the Hindu deity Krishna. The story of his visit to Dvārakā to meet his friend is featured in the Bhagavata Purana.

In their legend, Sudama and Krishna study together as children at Sandipani's ashrama, believed to have been at Ujjain. Leading a life of abject poverty, Sudama's wife urges him to go to Krishna, and request his assistance. Carrying some handfuls of parched rice as a gift, Sudama visits his old friend at Dvārakā, who receives him with honour. After discerning Sudama's unrevealed poverty, Krishna creates various luxurious palaces for his friend where his hut had stood, which the former sees when he returns home.

== Legend ==
In one iteration of his legend, Sudama, along with Tulasi, are stated to have once resided in Krishna's own abode, Goloka, before a curse by Radha forced them to be born on earth.

Accordingly, Sudama was born into a poor Brahmin family. He received his education as a pupil of Sandipani, who was also the guru of Krishna. While Sudama had only known poverty, his friend Krishna was from a royal family of Yaduvamsha lineage. Despite this difference in socioeconomic status, they were educated in the same way. According to one story, Krishna and Sudama were sent to the forest to get firewood for a havana, and the guru patni (guru's wife) had sent food with Sudama for both of them. After some time collecting firewood, they got tired and rested under a tree. Krishna mentioned to Sudama then that he wanted to drink water, and Sudama responded by saying that water should not be drank on an empty stomach, hiding from Krishna the fact that he had food. Krishna was tired and fell asleep on Sudama's lap, and after Krishna slept Sudama started eating the food. Krishna being omnipresent discovered this, and said to Sudama that he heard him eating something. Sudama lied to Krishna saying that what he heard must be his teeth clattering because of the cold, and he couldn't even repeat the Vishnu Sahasranama distinctly. Krishna responded that he believed him and mentioned that he knew that Sudama wouldn't eat anything alone without sharing with him, but he just wanted to check as he heard the sound. Despite this incident, their friendship did not waver. However, upon reaching adulthood, while Krishna became the Dvārakādhīśa, and became reputed for his deeds, while Sudama remained a humble and impoverished villager.

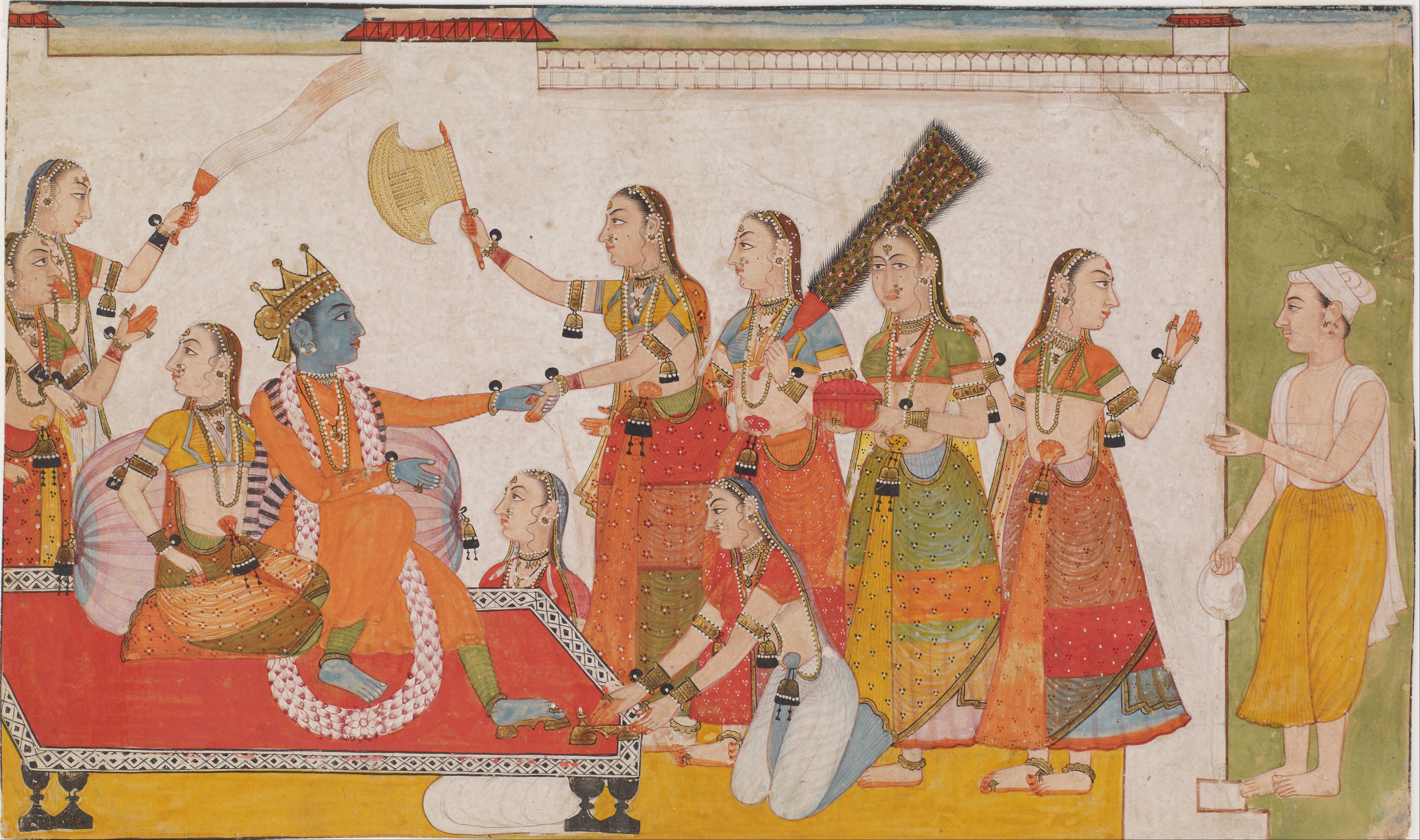
Krishna welcomes Sudama, from the 17th-century manuscript of Bhagavata Purana. Freer Gallery of Art

The Bhagavata Purana narrates that the reason Sudama was extremely poor despite being Krishna's friend is because he had lied to Krishna. Eventually, Sudama's starving wife implored her husband to visit Krishna and tell him of his impoverishment, stating that as the refuge of his devotees and a patron of Brahmins, he would no doubt shower his old friend with wealth. Despite his reluctance to seek help from Krishna, Sudama agreed, if only to see the deity, which would accrue punya. He asked his wife if there was anything he could bring his friend as a gift, and she was able to procure four handfuls of parched and beaten rice for him to take to Dvārakā. He entered the palace of Krishna, and found the deity seated on a couch with his favourite queen, Rukmini. Overjoyed at the sight of his old friend, Krishna made him sit on his own couch, and washed his feet, according to custom. He offered his friend a number of refreshments and smeared his body with pastes and perfumes. Rukmini herself attended on him, holding a whisk, to the astonishment of the women of the palace. Krishna and Sudama conversed about their boyhood days at the ashrama of Sandipani. Krishna recounted an incident when the duo were once tasked with bringing fuel from the forest during a great storm, wandering aimlessly as they held each other's hands, until their preceptor found them. The deity jovially asked his friend if he had brought any presents for him. Ashamed of what he had brought, Sudama did not respond. Being omniscient, Krishna declared that the grains of parched rice that had been brought to him were his favourite food, and swallowed one grain of it. Rukmini prevented him from having anymore, for the abundance of her consort's act overwhelmed the world. After spending the night in the palace, the Brahmin begun his journey back home, feeling small because he had been ashamed to ask for anything, but also content because he had obtained a darshana of the deity. He decided that Krishna had been merciful to deny him of wealth. Sudama returned to find that his humble hut had been transformed into several seven-storied palaces, filled with beautiful gardens and parks. He was welcomed by splendid musicians and singers. Delighted, his wife rushed to embrace him, looking like the goddess Lakshmi herself as she cried tears of joy. The flabbergasted Brahmin entered his house, finding that it resembled Svarga itself with its facilities and opulence. Sudama exulted in the generosity of the deity, for having smiled upon him during his time of misfortune. His wife and he enjoyed the worldly pleasures they had been blessed with without attachment, and grew even more devoted to Krishna.

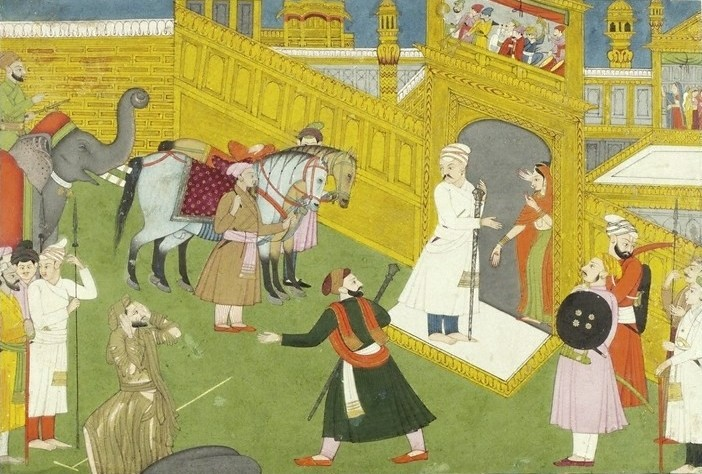
Sudama returns home to find in place of it, a golden palace, the gift of Krishna, ca 1775-1790 painting.

The generosity of Krishna and his friendship with Sudama is associated with the celebration of the festival of Akshaya Tritiya.

== See also ==
- Balarama
- Rukmini
- Draupadi
