= Sudarshan Setu =

- Coordinates: 22.4519°N 69.0847°E
- Carries: Motor vehicles, pedestrians and bicycles
- Crosses: Gulf of Kutch, Arabian Sea
- Locale: Okha and Beyt Dwarka, Gujarat, India
- Other name: Okha–Beyt Dwarka Signature Bridge

Characteristics
- Design: Cable-stayed bridge
- Material: Concrete, steel
- Total length: 2,320 metres (7,612 ft)
- Width: 27.2 metres (89 ft)
- Piers in water: 34

History
- Constructed by: SP Singla Construction Pvt Ltd
- Construction start: 7 October 2017
- Construction end: 10 December 2023
- Construction cost: ₹979 crore (US$120 million)
- Opened: 25 February 2024

Location
- Interactive map of Sudarshan Setu

The Sudarshan Setu is a cable-stayed bridge in India, connecting the Beyt Dwarka island in the Gulf of Kutch and Okha. The total length of the bridge is 2,320 metres (7,612 ft). It was inaugurated on 25 February 2024.

== History ==
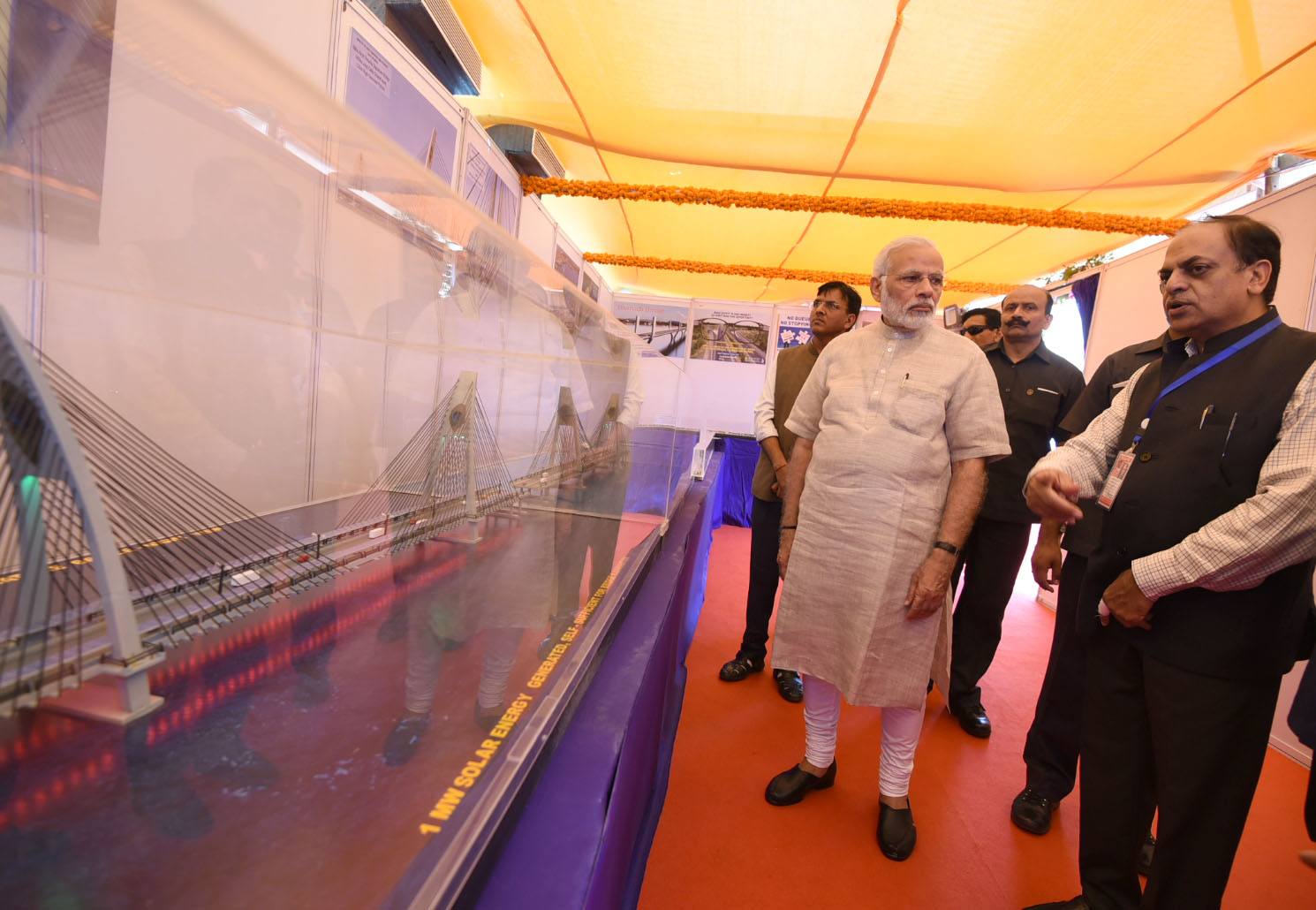
Modi observing the bridge model during the foundation stone laying ceremony in 2017

The construction of the bridge was approved by Union Transport Minister Nitin Gadkari in 2016. Prime Minister Narendra Modi laid the foundation stone of the bridge on 7 October 2017. It was constructed at the cost of ₹979 crore (US$120 million).

The bridge serves about 8500 people living on the island as well as about two million pilgrims visiting the temples there. It was inaugurated on 25 February 2024 by Prime Minister Narendra Modi.

== Architectural features ==
Sudarshan Setu is a cable-stayed bridge, with cables in a fan arrangement, built using concrete pylons. The deck is made of composite steel-reinforced concrete with two carriageways. The total width of the bridge is 27.2 metres (89 ft), with two lanes in each direction and a 2.5-metre (8 ft)-wide footpath on each side. The solar panels atop footpath shade have capacity of 1 MW.

With a total length of 2,320 metres (7,612 ft), the cable bridge has a 900-metre (2,953 ft) long central cable section, making it the longest cable stayed bridge in India. It has three spans with 500 metre-long main span, the longest in India. The other 3 spans on either sides have length of 100 metres (328 ft) and 2 span 50 metres (164 ft) each. The approaches bridge on Okha and Beyt Dwarka sides have length of 770 metres (2,526 ft) and 650 metres (2,133 ft) respectively. Two A-shaped curved pylons supporting the bridge are 129.985 metres (426 ft) tall and radius of 300 metres (984 ft) leaning in backspan up to 22 metres (72 ft) from center of pylon. The total length of the road is 2.8 kilometres (9,186 ft).

== See also ==
- Sudama Setu
- List of longest bridges in the world
- List of longest bridges above water in India
