= Gujarat Tourism =

Indian state agency

The Tourism Corporation of Gujarat, operating under the brand of Gujarat Tourism, is a government undertaking formed in 1978 to promote tourism in the Indian state of Gujarat and guide tourists visiting Gujarat.

== Hill stations ==
- Mount Girnar
- Saputara Hills
- Pavagadh Hill
- Wilson Hills
- Shatrunjaya Hill
- Dhinodhar Hills
- Bhujia Hill
- Parnera Hill
- Kalo Dungar

== Beaches ==
- Shivrajpur Beach
- Mandvi Beach
- Bet Dwarka
- Tithal Beach
- Gopnath Beach
- Umargam Beach
- Umbharat Beach
- Dandi Beach
