= Shri Keshavraiji Temple, Bet Dwarka =

Coordinates: 22°27′07″N 69°05′45″E

Shri Keshavraiji Temple
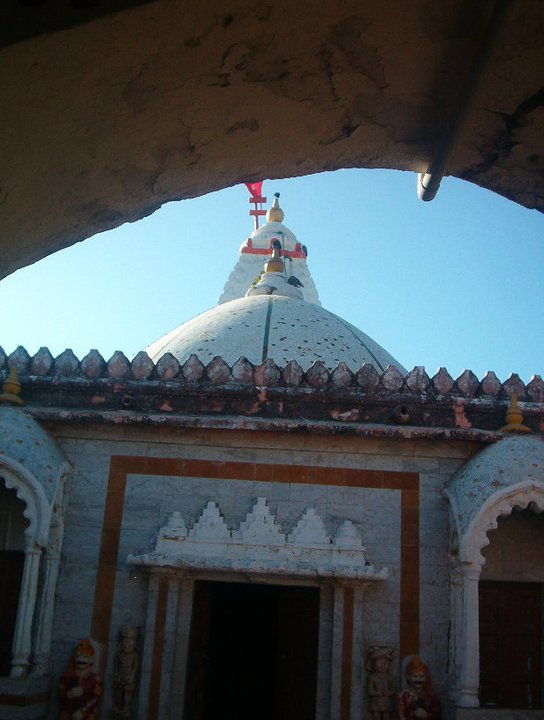

Religion
- Affiliation: Hinduism
- District: Devbhumi Dwarka district
- Deity: Lord Krishna

Location
- Location: Bet Dwarka
- State: Gujarat
- Country: India
- Interactive map of Shri Keshavraiji Temple

Shri Keshavraiji Temple is located on an island Bet Dwarka, in Gujarat, India. It is an ancient temple dedicated to Lord Krishna which was built by the Pushkarna (Pushtikar) Brahmin community. It is situated near holy lake "Shankh Sarovar" 1 km from Beyt Jetty and Dwarkadhish Temple. Bet Dwarka is famous for its temples dedicated to Lord Krishna and is of great importance in the ancient Hindu tradition.

== Lord Shri Keshavraiji ==
Lord Shri Keshavraiji is Ishtdev of Samasth Pushkarna Gyati. This ancient temple is located in Bet-Dwarka, near Mahaprabhuji Bethak, which is 30 km away from Dwarka, on the seashore. Pushkarna Brahmin along with Bhatia devotees, mostly from Sindh, Rajasthan, Kutch, Gujarat Punjab, visit Bet Dwarka to worship Lord Keshavraiji most often. Registers witness the forename and family name of all pushkarna devotees, hand-written as long ago as 250 years.

To reach Bet-Dwarka one has to travel to Okha, and then proceed by motorboat to Bet Dwarka. Okha is connected by rail and is the last railway station. There is a direct train to Okha from Mumbai, Ahmedabad, Gorakhpur, Guwahati, Eranakulam Junction, Rameshwaram, Puri, Dehradun, Varanasi Junction.

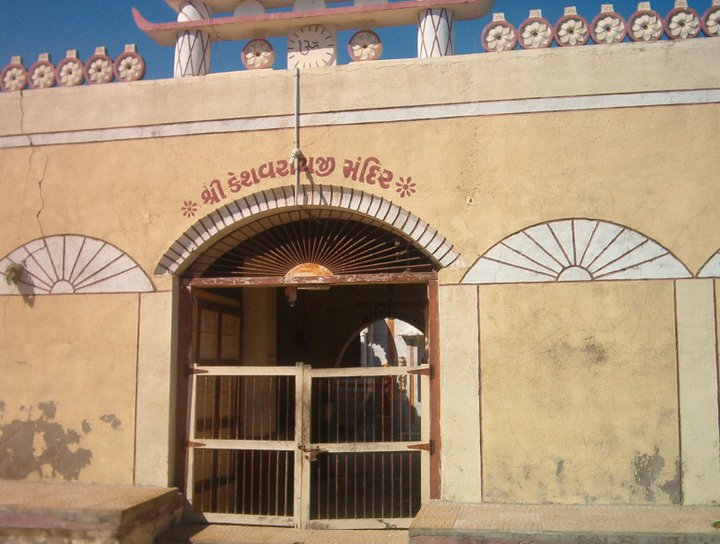
Shri Keshavraiji Temple Main Gate

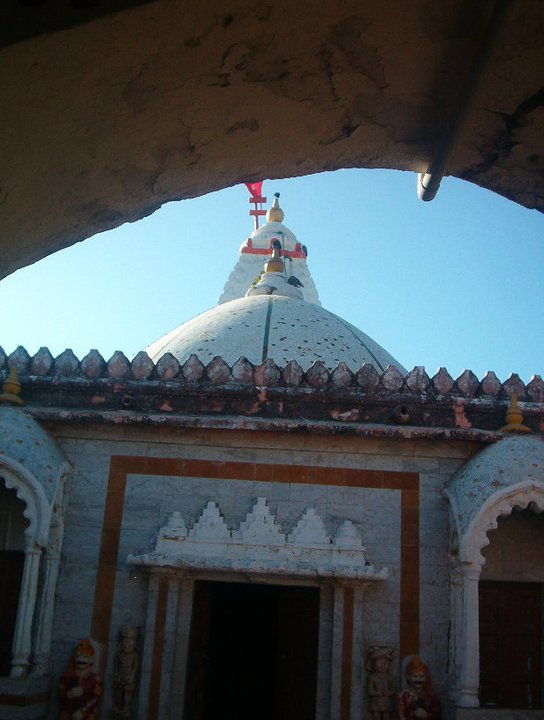
Shri Keshavraiji Temple Door
