= Tithal Beach =

Human settlement in India

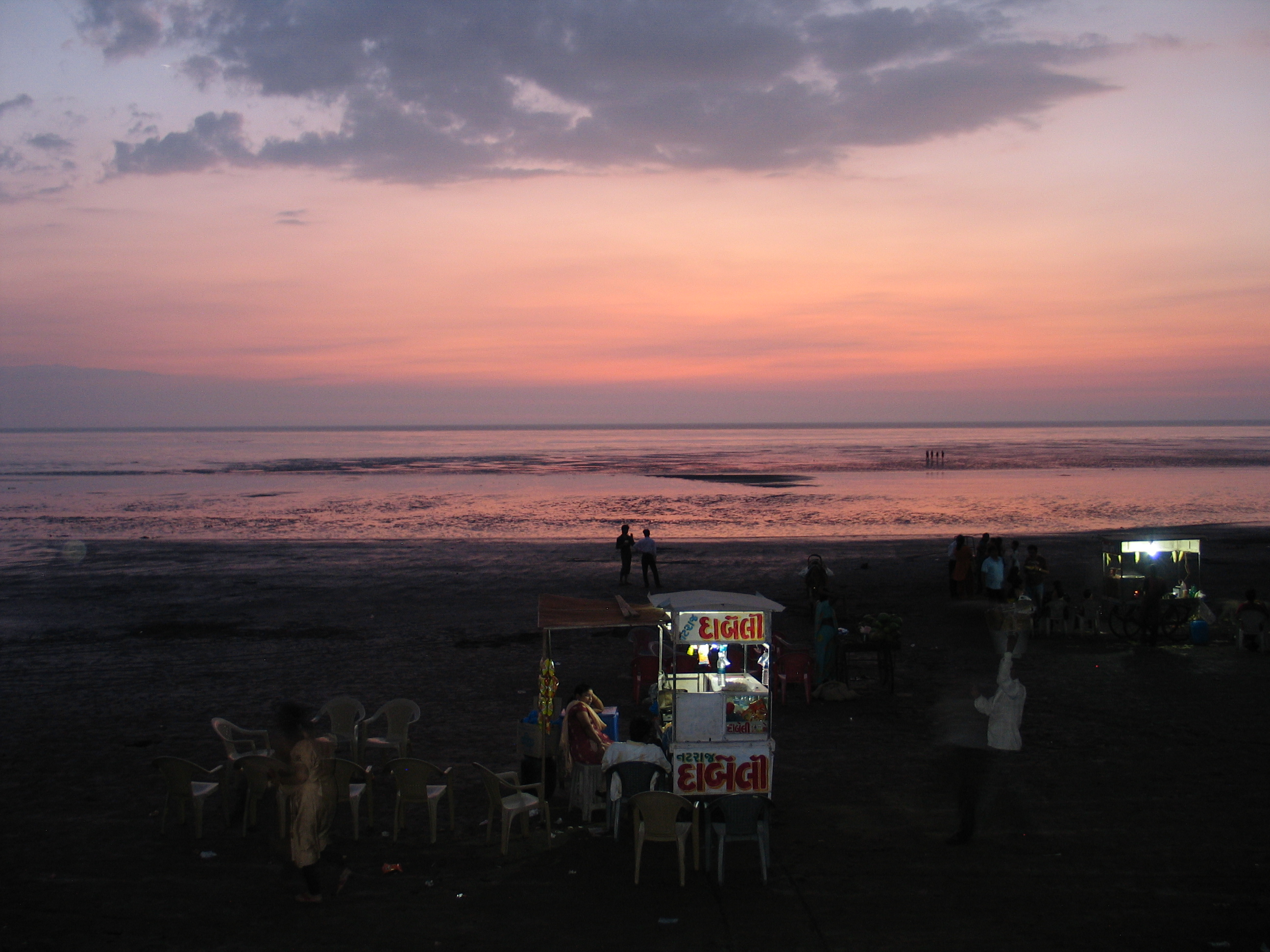
- Sunset, Tithal beach
- Interactive map of Tithal Beach
- Type: Black sand beach
- Location: Arabian Sea, Tithal, Valsad district, Gujarat
- Nearest city: Valsad, Gujarat
- Coordinates: 20°35′53.6″N 72°53′41″E

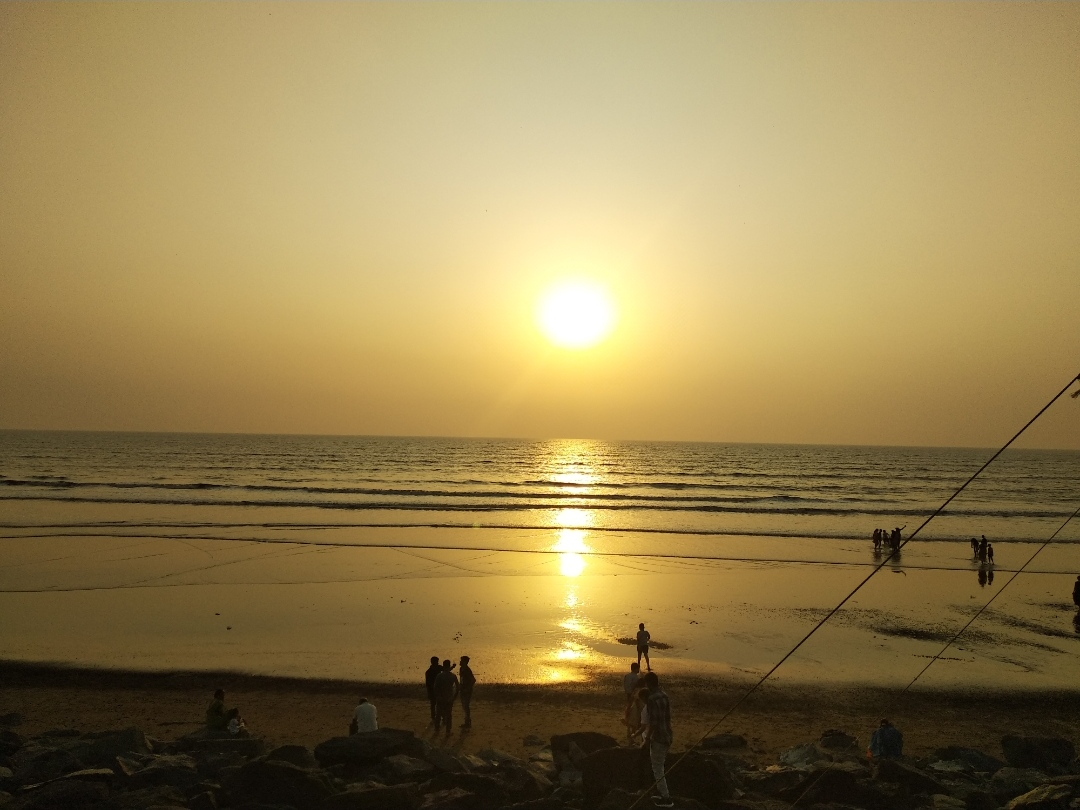
Evening at Tithal Beach in 2018

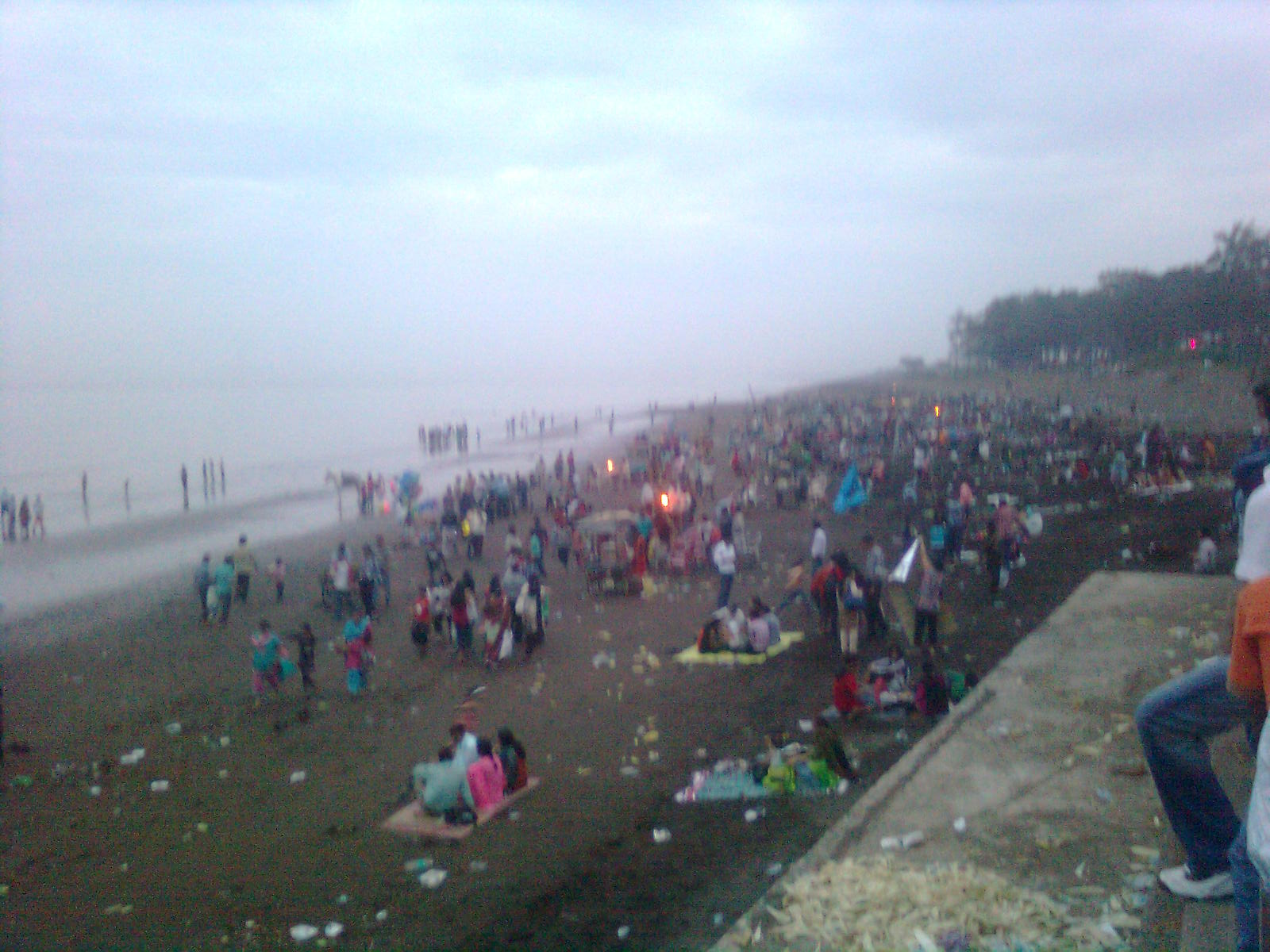
Crowd at Tithal beach on non holiday

Tithal Beach is located in Valsad on the coast of Arabian Sea in the state of Gujarat.The sand of the beach is Black sand. Tithal beach is one of the popular tourist attractions of Valsad district and Gujarat. Recently, Aquatic sports have been started at the beach like Speed boats, Jet Ski etc. Tithal Beach also has other tourist attractions near the shore of the beach like Shree Shirdi Saibaba Temple, Shree Swaminarayan Temple.

Tithal Beach Festival and International Kite Festival are also organized on the shore of the beach because of its popularity.

== See also ==
- Shivrajpur beach
- Dandi Beach
- Gopnath Beach
- Dumas Beach
