= Gopnath Beach =

Sandbeach in Bhavnagar, Gujarat

Coordinates: 21°12′35″N 72°6′28″E

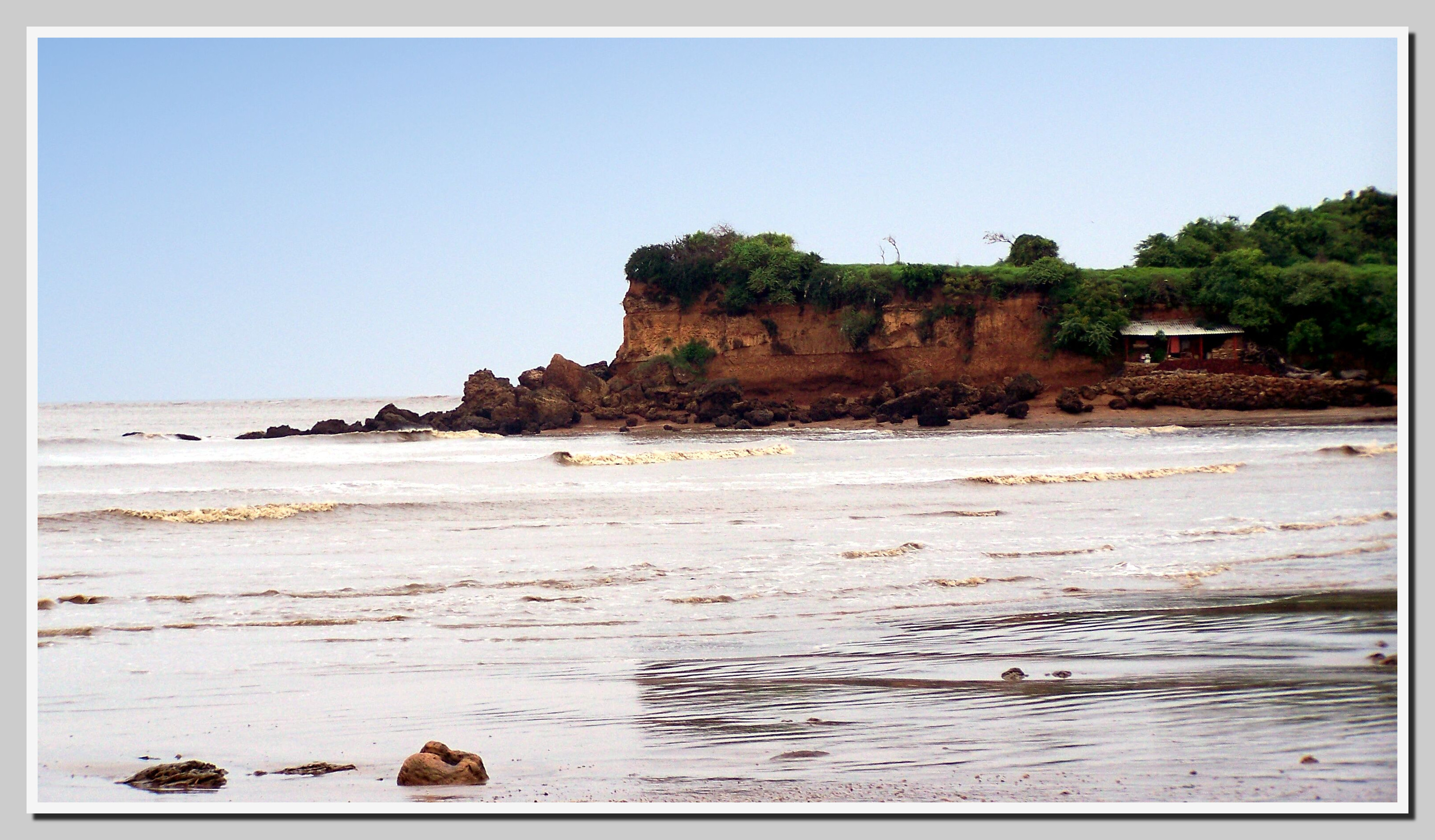
Gopanath Beach Gujarat India

Gopnath Beach is a beach situated in the Talaja Taluka of Bhavnagar district of Gujarat state of India. It is located on the coast of the Gulf of Kambhat, at a distance of 75 km (47 mi) from the city of Bhavnagar and 22 km (14 mi) away from Talaja.

Gopnath Mahadev Temple is located here close to beach. The temple is big and well maintained. Nearly 700 years old, the Gopnath Mahadev Temple is the temple which hoists two flags, where the first flag which is of white color banderole indicating the aristocrat Vishnu Temple while the saffron black banderole symbolizes the temple of God Mahadev. This Shiva temple is where the devotional poet Narsinh Mehta supposedly had his spiritual experience almost 500 years ago. The temple is set on the seashore.

There is a fort of the king of Gohilvad in Gopnath.

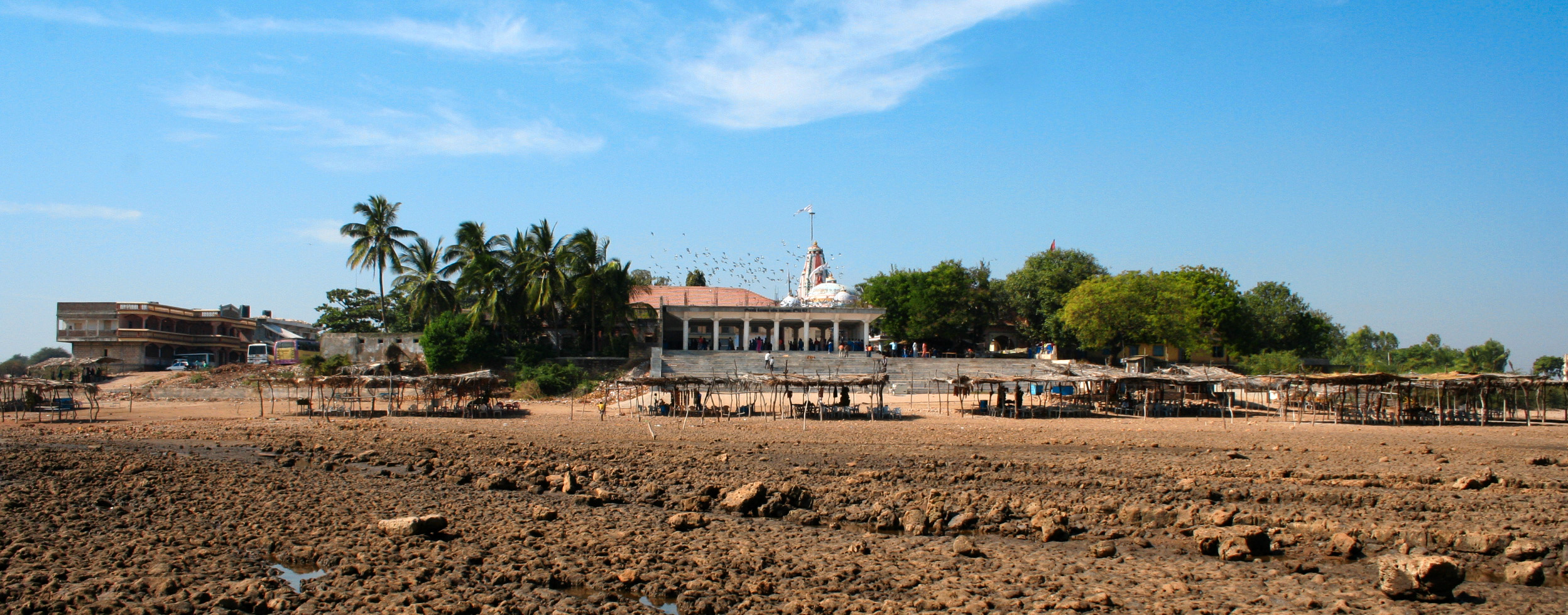
Gopnath Temple from distance

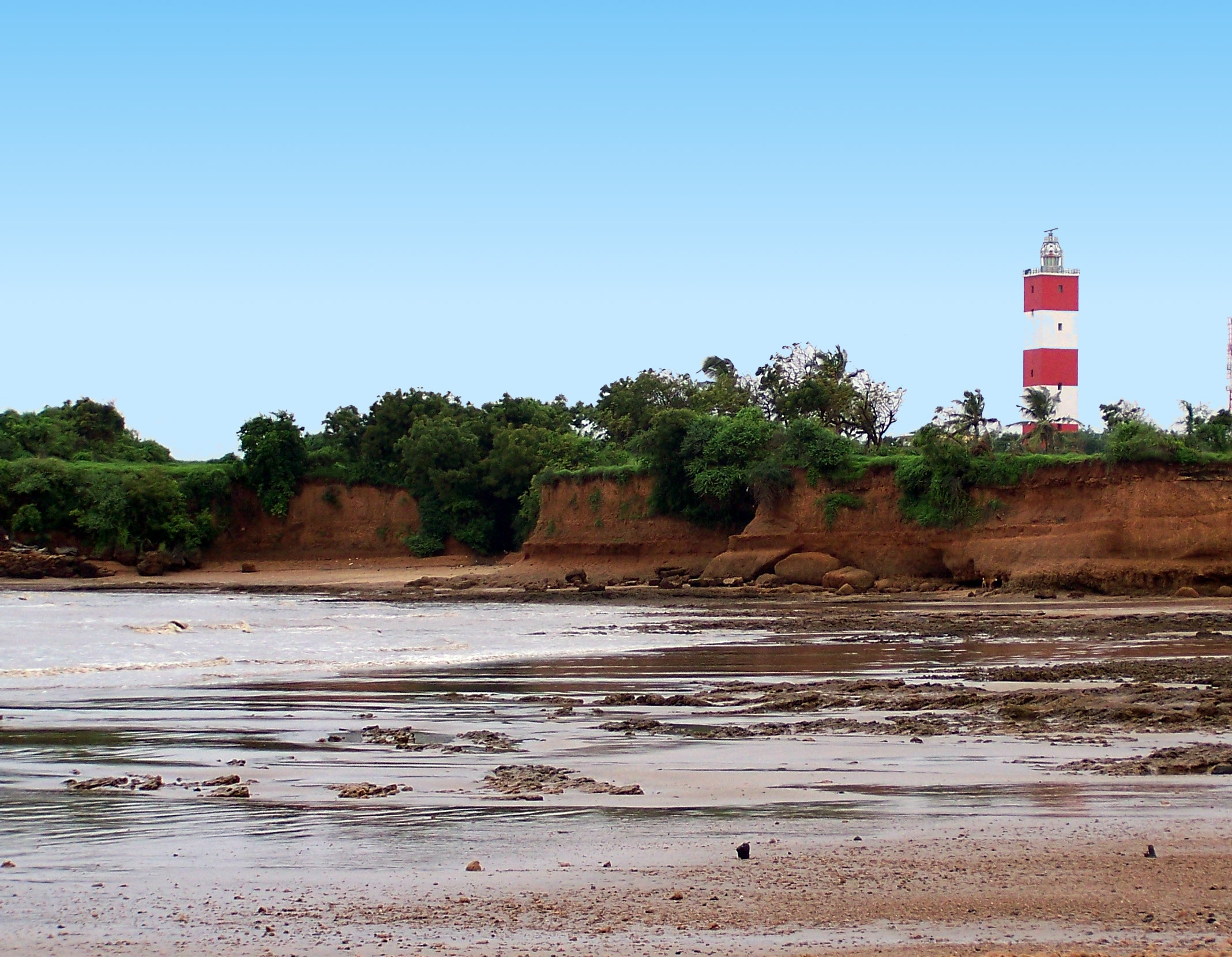
Lighthouse

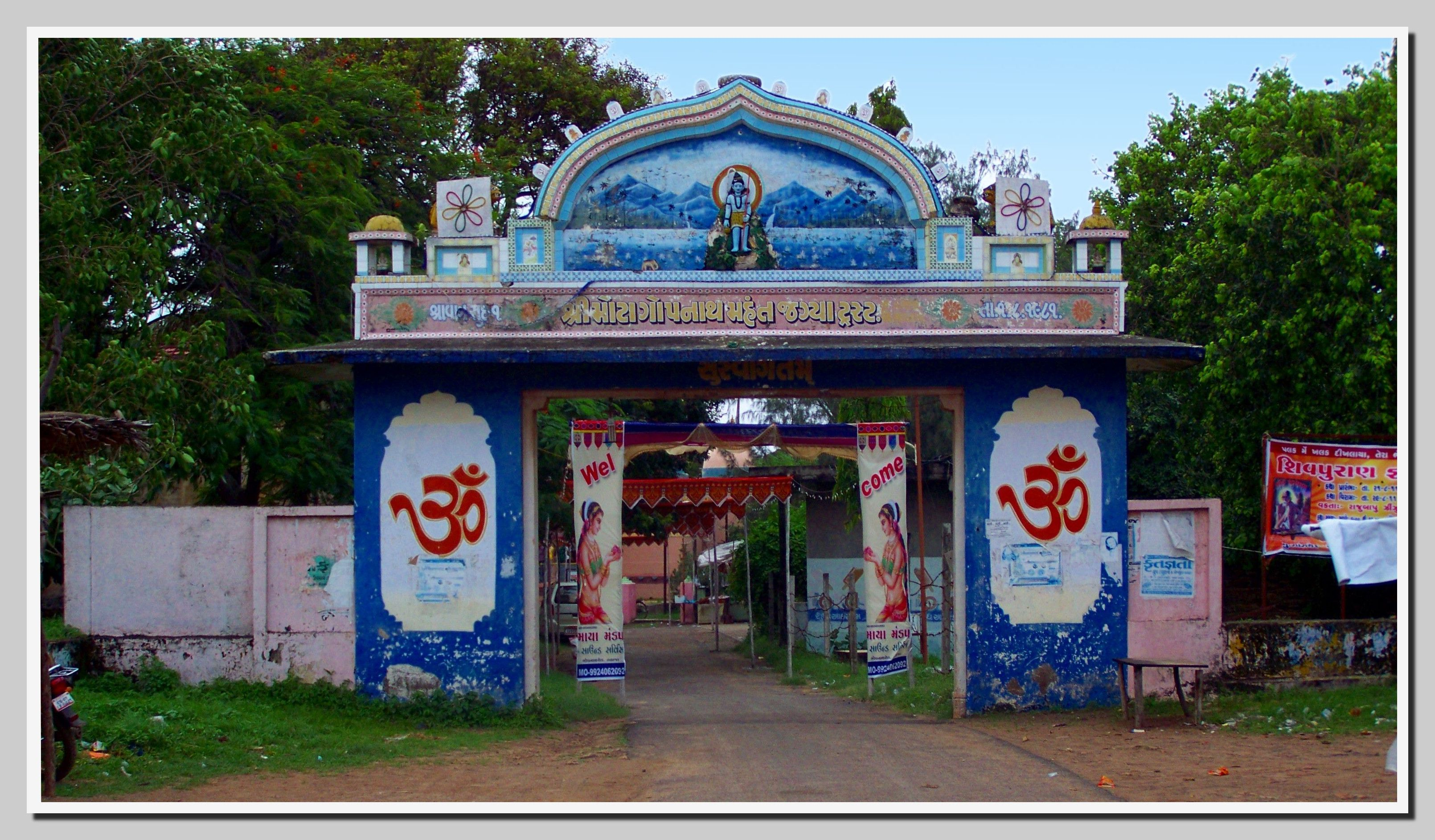
Temple entrance

== See also ==
- Shivrajpur beach
- Dandi Beach
- Tithal Beach
