= Dwarkadhish Temple =

Temple in Gujarat, India

Dwarkadheesh Temple
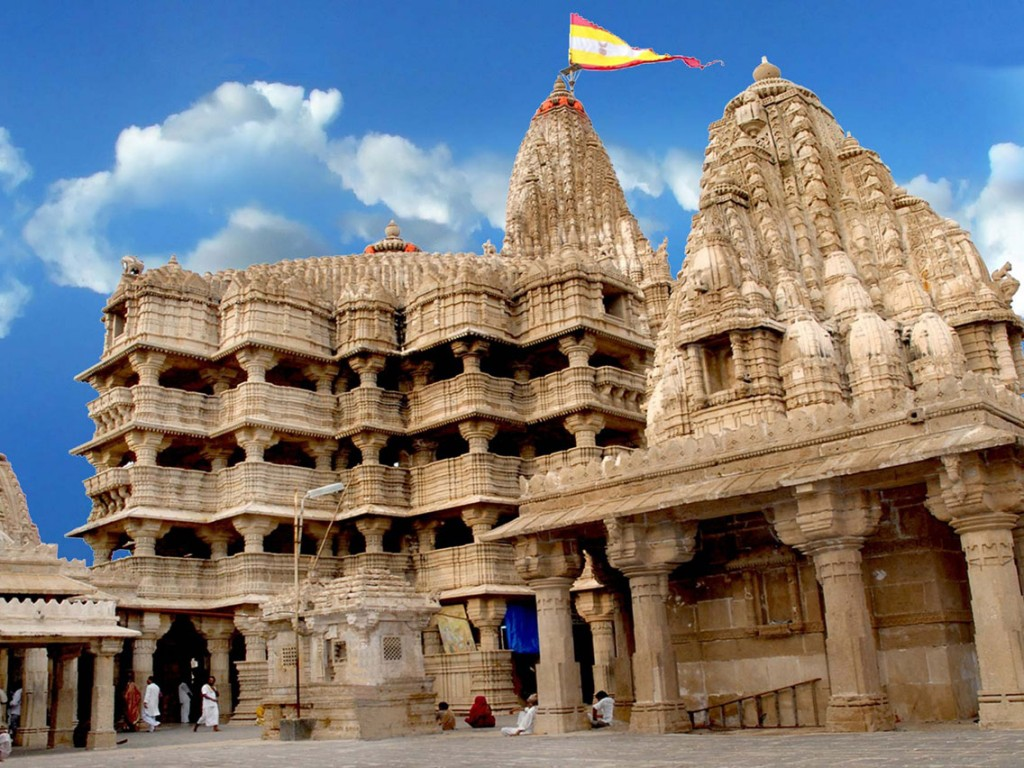

- Location in Gujarat

Religion
- Affiliation: Hinduism
- Deity: Krishna
- Festival: Krishna Janmashtami

Location
- Location: Dwarka
- State: Gujarat
- Country: India
- Coordinates: 22°14′16.39″N 68°58′3.22″E

Architecture
- Type: Temple
- Style: Māru-Gurjara architecture
- Completed: 15th–16th century (present architecture)
- Elevation: 12.19 m (40 ft)

Website
- www.dwarkadhish.org

The Dwarkadhish temple, also known as the Jagat Mandir and occasionally spelled Dwarakadheesh, is a Hindu temple dedicated to Krishna, who is worshiped in the temple by the name Dwarkadhish (Sanskrit: द्वारकाधीश, IAST: Dvārakādhīśa, meaning: 'Lord of Dvārakā'). The temple is located in Dwarka city of Gujarat, India, which is one of the destinations of Char Dham, a Hindu pilgrimage circuit. The main shrine of the five-storied building, supported by 72 pillars, is known as Jagat Mandir or Nija Mandir. Archaeological findings suggest the original temple was built in 200 BCE at the earliest. The temple was rebuilt and enlarged in the 15th–16th century.

The temple became part of the Char Dham pilgrimage considered sacred by Hindus in India. Adi Shankara, the 8th century Hindu theologian and philosopher, visited the shrine. The other three being comprising Rameswaram, Badrinath and Puri. Even today a memorial within the temple is dedicated to his visit. Dwarakadheesh is the 98th Divya Desam of Vishnu on the subcontinent, glorified in the Divya Prabandha sacred texts. The temple is at an elevation of 12.19 metres (40.0 ft) above mean sea-level. It faces west. The temple layout consists of a garbhagriha (Nijamandira or Harigraha) and an antarala (an antechamber). The original structure was destroyed by Mahmud Begada in 1473. The existing temple is dated to 16th century.

== Legend ==
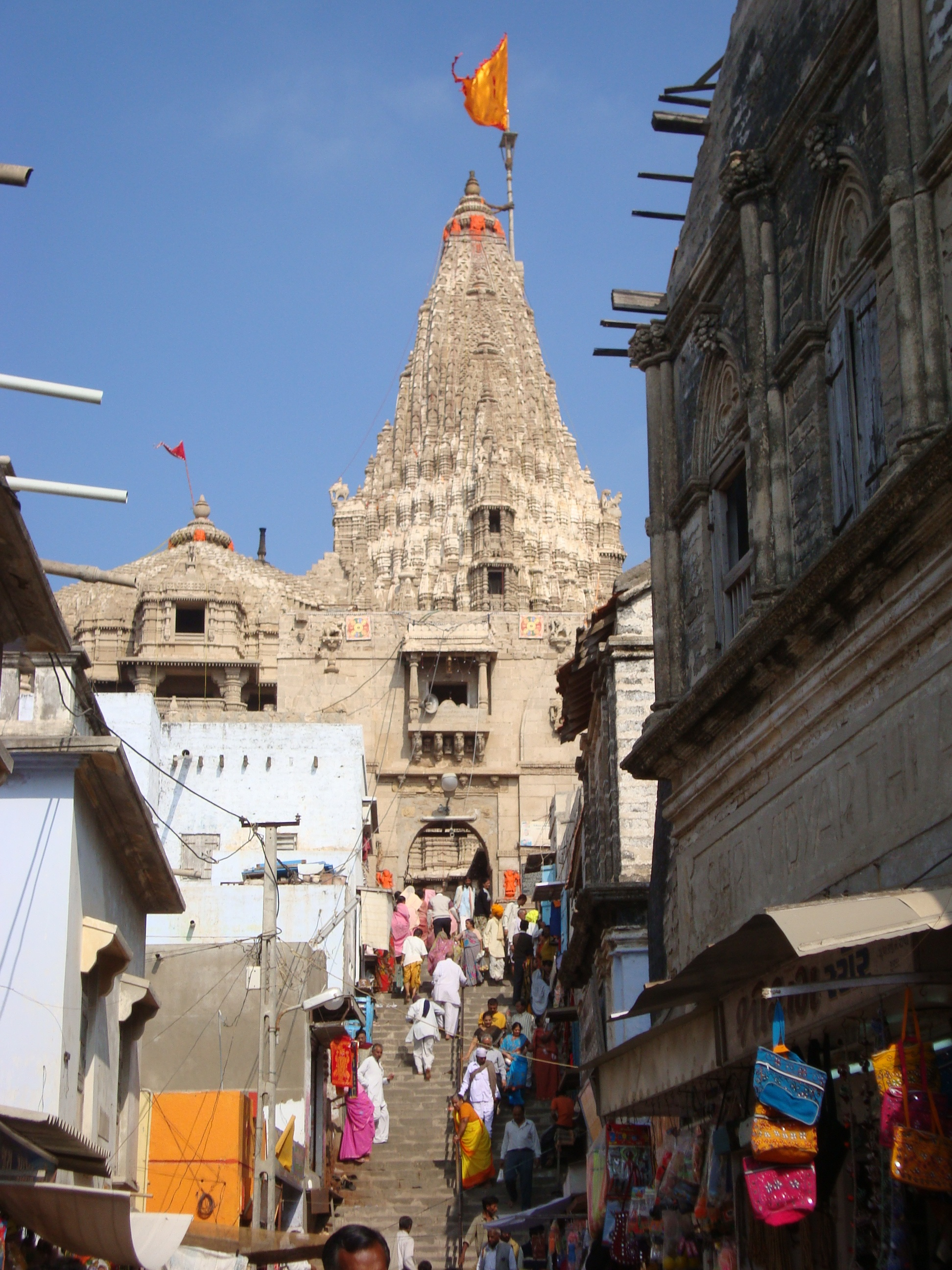
Stairs leading up to the main entrance of the temple

As per Hindu legend, Dwarka was built on a piece of land by Krishna that was reclaimed from the sea. According to the Mahabharata, the sage Durvasa once visited Krishna and his wife Rukmini. The sage wished that the pair took him to their palace, demanding that they pull his chariot like horses. The pair agreed and started to carry the sage, even as the latter struck Rukmini when she fell. After some distance, according to local tradition, Rukmini got tired and she requested some water from Krishna. Krishna dug a hole with his powers that brought in the river Ganga to the place. Durvasa was furious and cursed Rukmini to remain in the place. The temple where Rukmini's shrine is found, is believed to be the place where she stood. In the epic, finding no fault with the divine couple, Durvasa blessed Krishna with invincibility everywhere except the soles of his feet, and declared that Rukmini would be the foremost of the deity's spouses and would be his eternal companion in the next world as well.

== History ==
The town of Dwarka in Gujarat has a history that dates back centuries, and mentioned in the Mahabharata epic as the Dwaraka kingdom. Situated on the banks of river Gomti, the town is described in legend as the capital of Krishna. Evidence such as a stone block with script, the way the stones were dressed showing that dowels had been used, and an examination of anchors found on the site suggest that the harbour site dates only to historical times, with some of the underwater structure being late Medieval. Coastal erosion was probably the cause of the destruction of what was an ancient port.

In the fifteenth century the Raja of Dwarka was a Vadhel named Bhim who also ruled the local Vagher pirates. Once a maulana named Mahmud Samarqandi was undergoing a sea voyage when storm caused his vessel to go towards the coast of Dwarka. There the ship was attacked by Vagher pirates who plundered the ship, kidnapped his women, and left Mahmud and his sons adrift. Mahmud Samarqandi brought this matter to Sultan Mahmud at his court in Mustafabad. Thus the sultan decide to capture Dwarka and in 1473 began marching towards the city. The Raja of Dwarka Bhim and his Rajputs fled the city to the island fortress of Bet, allowing Mahmud Begada to plunder Dwarka, destroy buildings and the Dwarkadhish temple and destroy its idol. However according to a Rangarajan, citing a Gujarati article by Jayantilal Thaker, the Veghars "did their utmost to defend" the temple.

The current image of Dvārakādhīśa was installed by Aniruddhaśrama Śaṅkarācārya in 1559.

Many traditions also believes that the great devotee Bodana took the original idol of Lord Krishna to town of Dakor in 1156 CE. According to this legend, Bodana was a elderly man and a devotee of krishna who walked to Dwarka every six months for 72 years. Pleased by his intense devotions, the Lord agreed to accompany him to Dakor in a bullock cart. When the local priests realised that the idol was missing, they chased Bodana to reclaim, however, the idol was safely hidden. The tradition states that the current idol was later discovered inside Savitri vav (Historically recorded as Shivadhan Vav), an ancient step well in dwarka.

== Structure ==
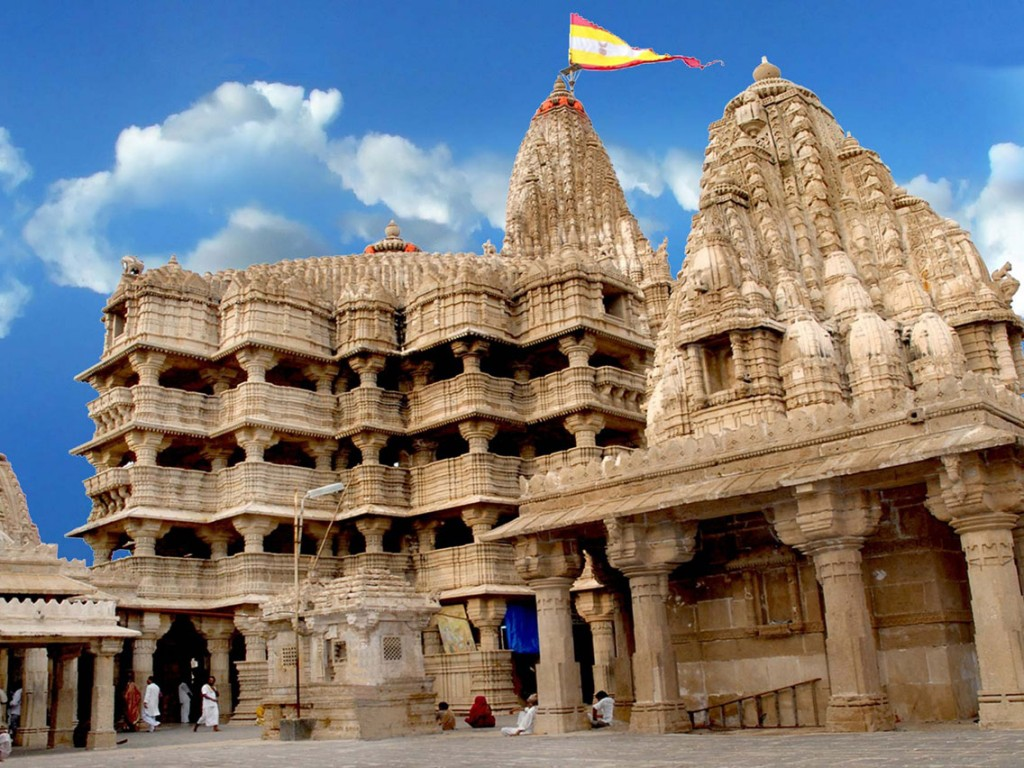
View of the five floors

The Dwarkadhish Temple, also known as the Jagat Mandir, is a five-story structure constructed primarily of limestone and sandstone. The temple is supported by a total of 72 pillars that form the structural framework of the building. The temple has two principal gateways: the northern entrance, known as the Moksha Dwara (Door to Salvation), opens toward the local market, while the southern entrance, called the Swarga Dwara (Gate to Heaven), leads to a flight of 56 steps descending to the ghats of the Gomati River.

The temple has an east–west length of 29 m and north–south width of 23 m. The temple is constructed of limestone and has intricate carvings.

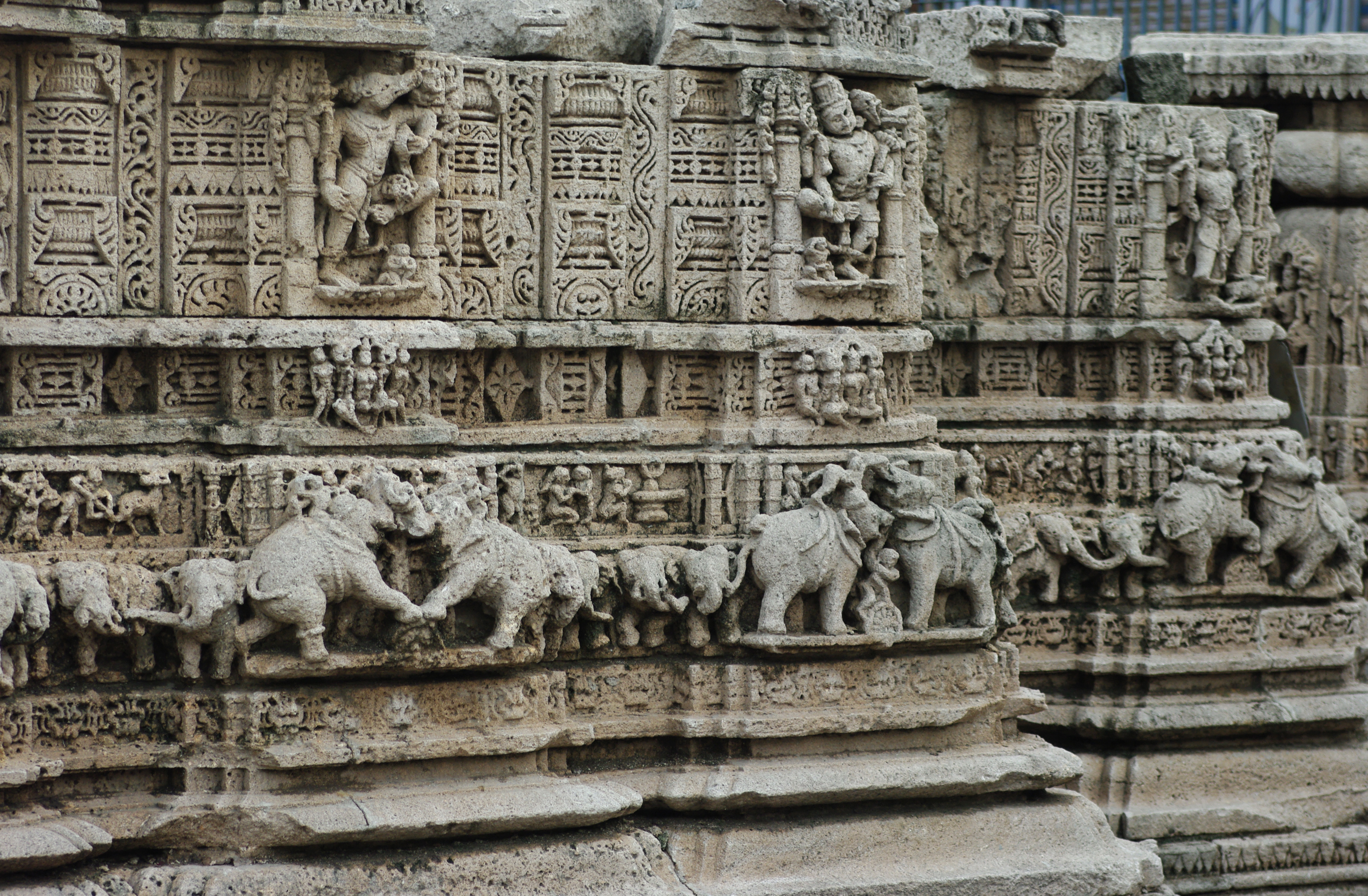
Carvings around the platform

The temple spire rises to a height of 78 metres (256 ft). A flag, hoisted over the spire, shows the sun and moon, which is believed to indicate that Krishna would be there until the sun and moon exist on Earth. The flag, triangular in shape, is 50 feet (15 m) in length. This flag is changed four times a day with a new one and devotees pay a huge sum of money to hoist it by purchasing a new flag. The money received on this account is credited to the trust fund of the temple to meet the operation and maintenance expenses of the temple.

== Religious importance ==
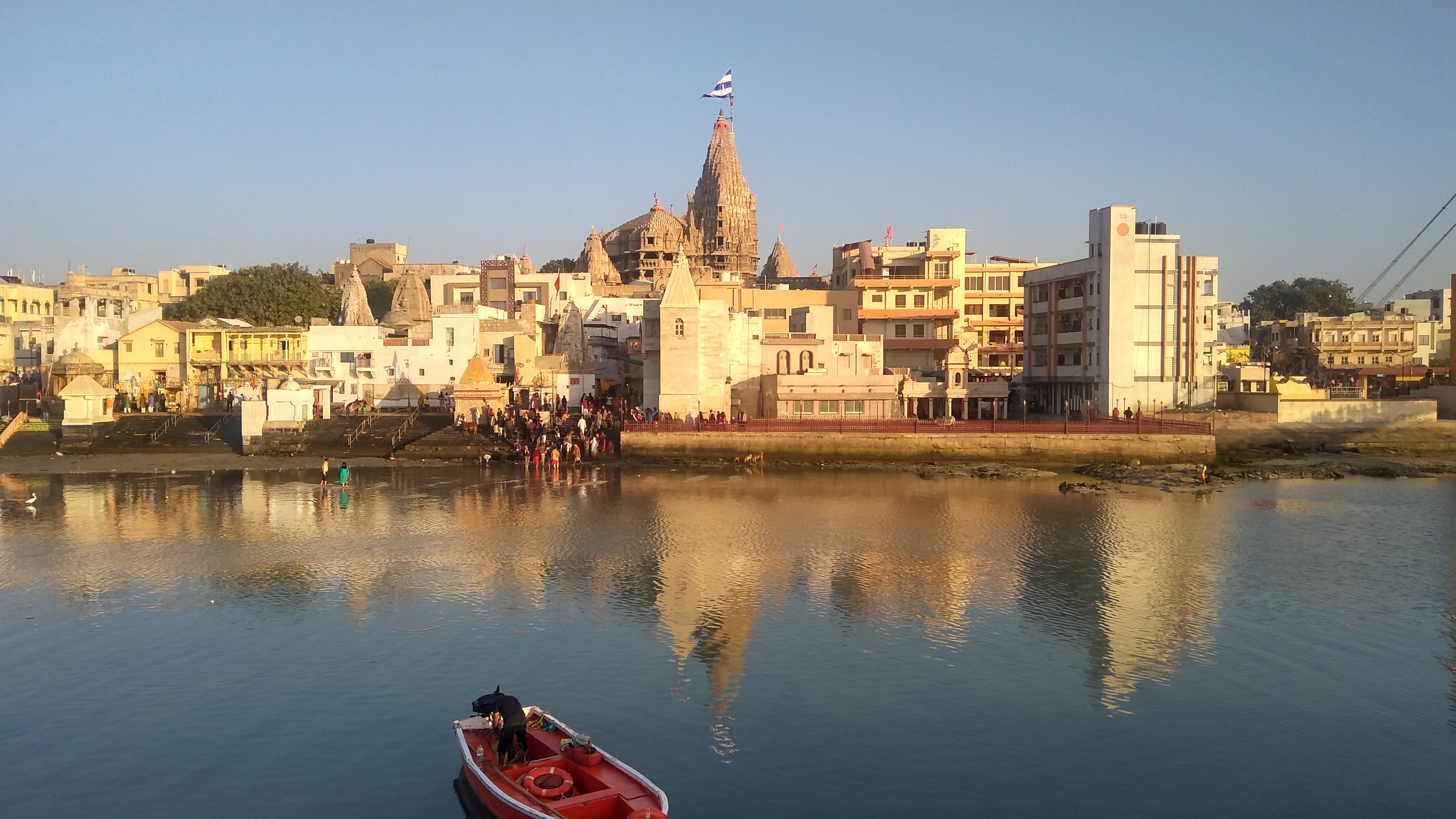
Dwarkadhish Temple near Gomti river, Dwarka

Char Dham

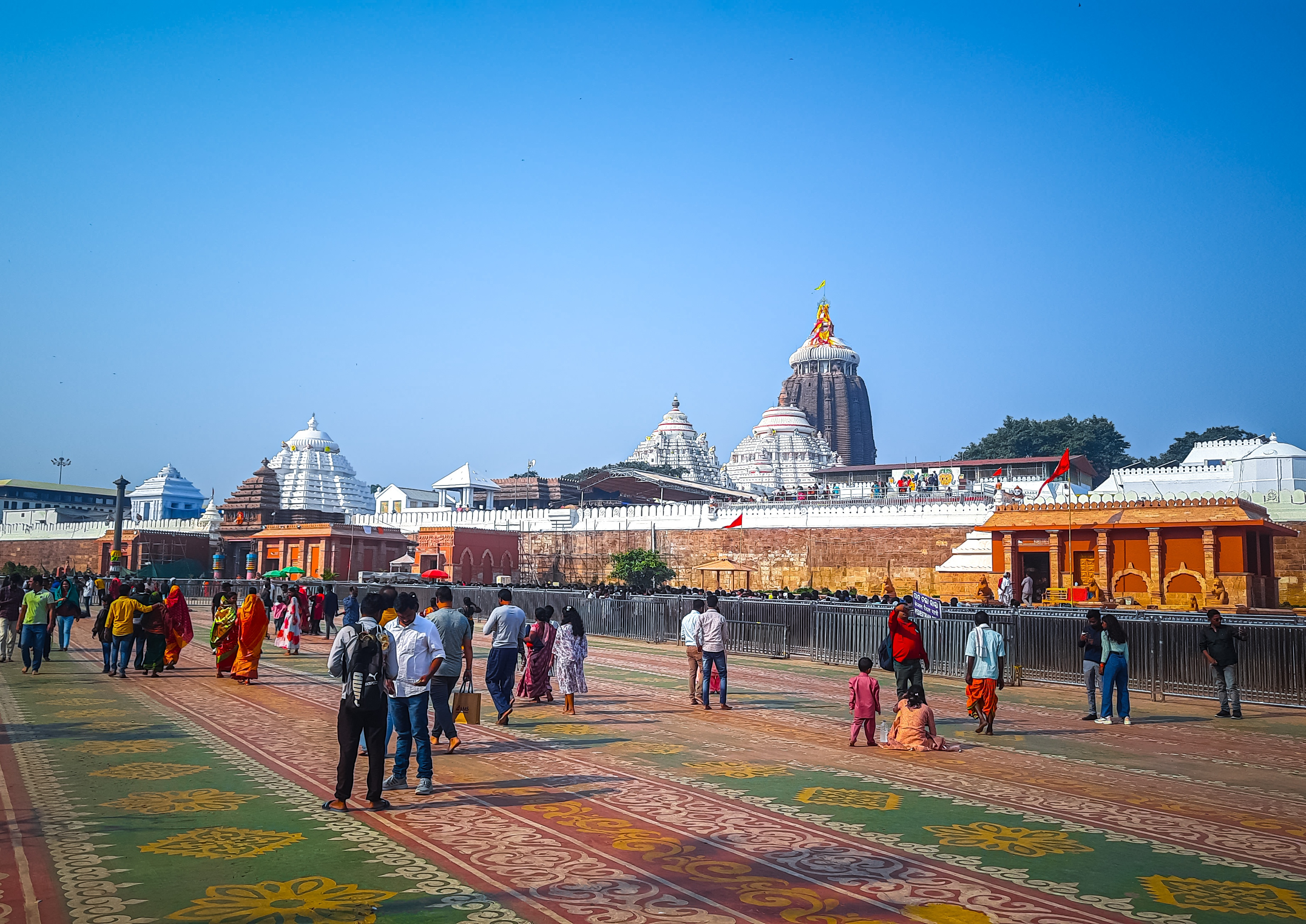
Jagannath Puri

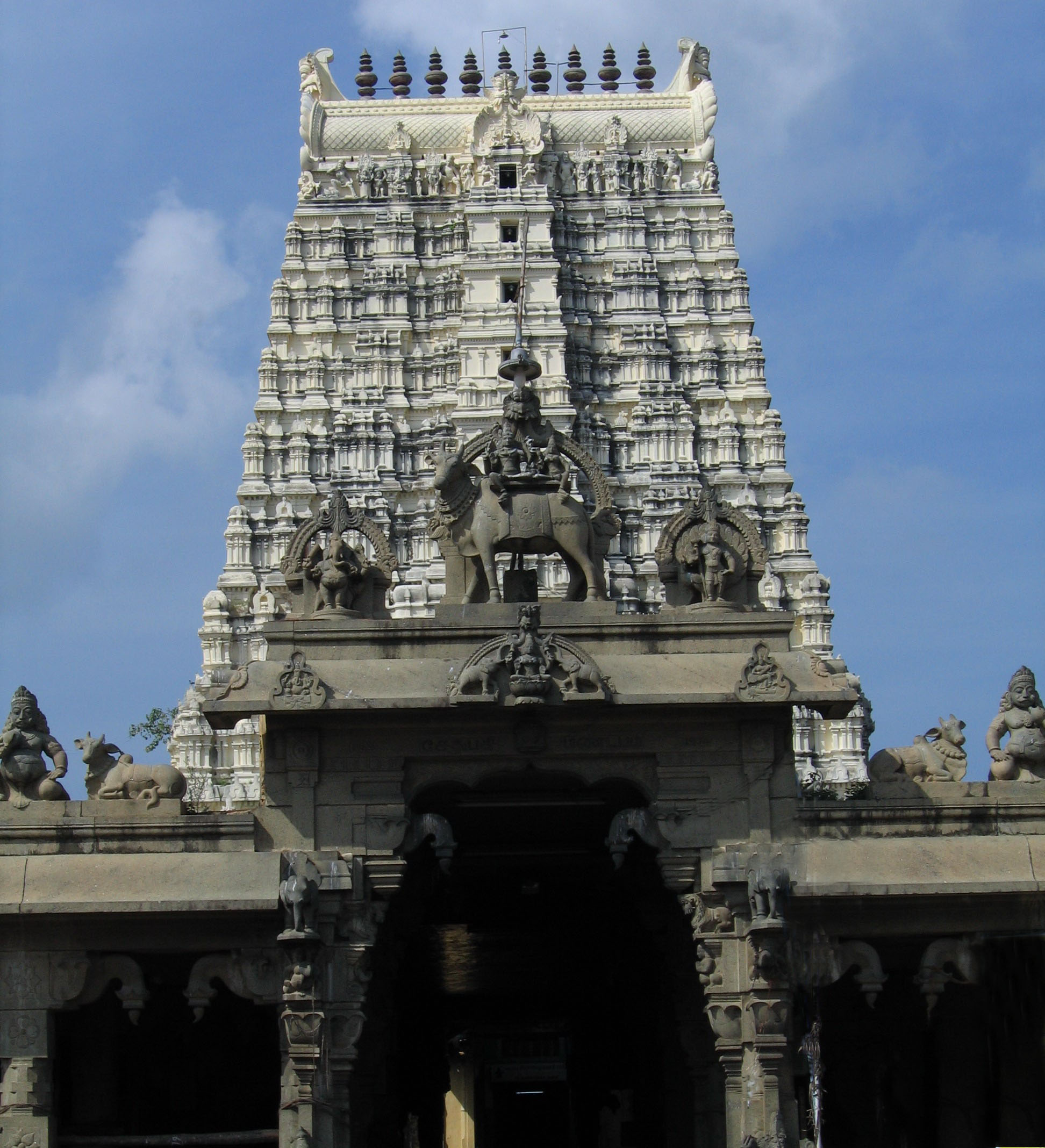
Rameswaram

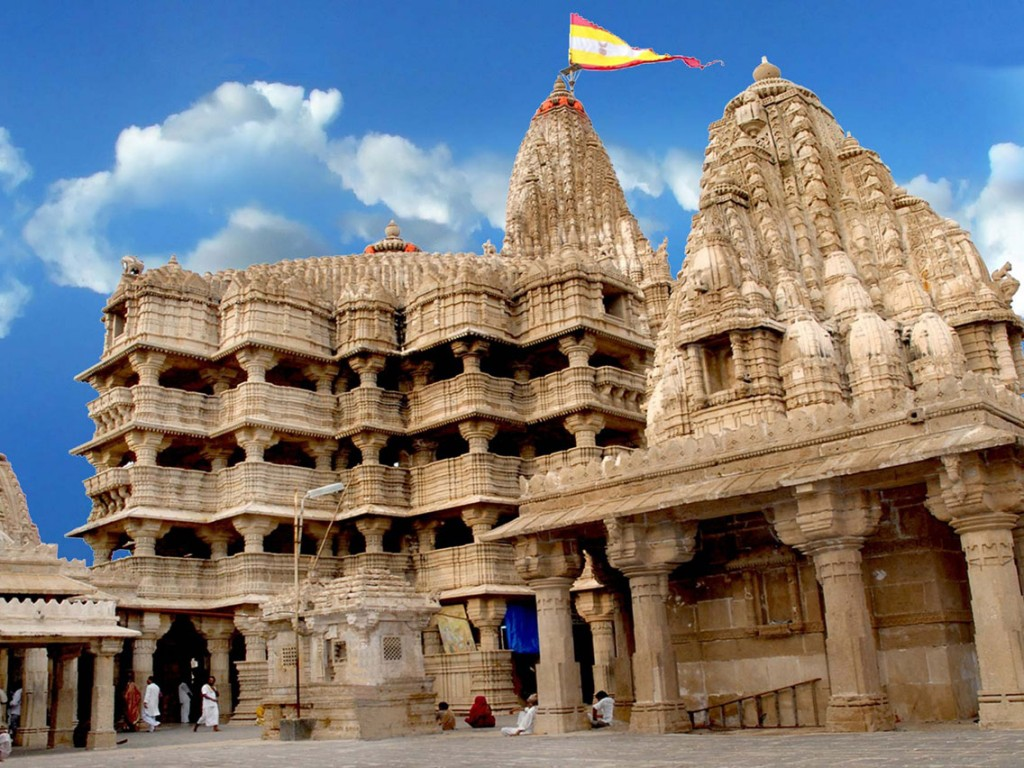
Dwarka

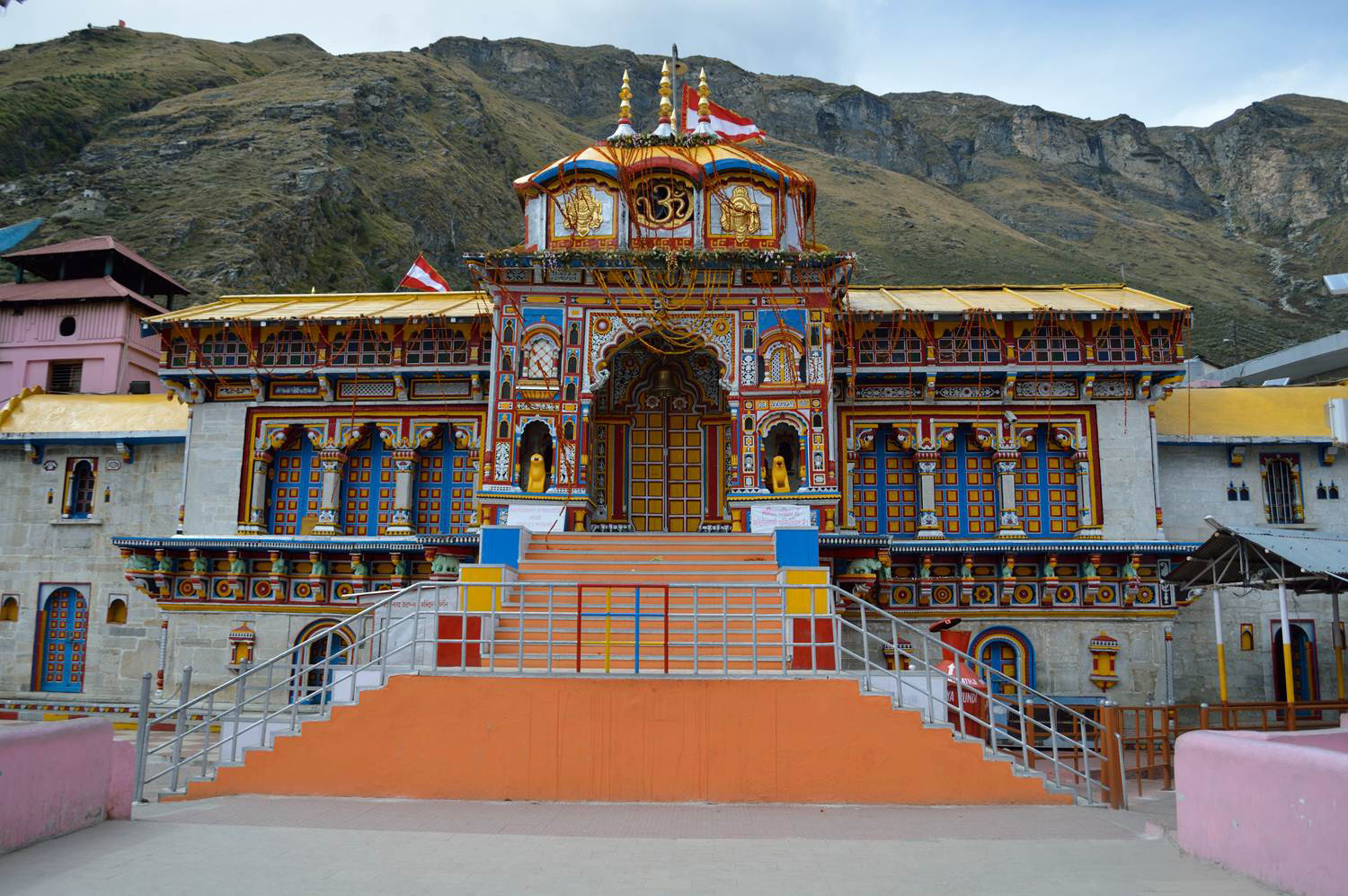
Badrinath

Since this site is associated with the ancient city of Dvārakā and the Vedic era Krishna of Mahabharata, it is an important place of pilgrimage for Hindus. It is one of three main pilgrimage sites related to "Krishna" circuit, namely 48 kos parikrama of Kurukshetra in Haryana state, Braj Parikarma in Mathura of Uttar Pradesh state and Dwarka Parikrama (Dwarkadish Yatra) at Dwarkadhish Temple in Gujarat state.

Though the origins are not clearly known, the Advaita school of Hinduism established by Adi Shankara, who created Hindu monastic institutions across India, attributes the origin of Char Dham to the seer. The four monasteries are located across the four corners of India and their attendant temples are Badrinath Temple at Badrinath in the North, Jagannath Temple at Puri in the East, Dwarakadhish Temple at Dwarka in the West and Ramanathaswamy Temple at Rameswaram in the South. Though ideologically the temples are divided between the sects of Hinduism, namely Shaivism and Vaishnavism, the Char Dham pilgrimage is an all Hindu affair. The journey across the four cardinal points in India is considered sacred by Hindus who aspire to visit these temples once in their lifetime. Traditionally the trip starts are the eastern end from Puri, proceeding in clockwise direction in a manner typically followed for circumambulation in Hindu temples.

The temple is open from 6.00 am to 1.00 pm and 5.00 pm to 9.30 pm. The Krishna Janmashtami festival, or Gokulashtami, the birthday of Krishna was commissioned by Vallaba (1473-1531).

According to a legend, Meera Bai, the famed Rajput princess who was also a poet-saint and a staunch devotee of Krishna, merged with the deity at this temple. It is one of the Sapta Puri, the seven holy cities of India.

The temple is near the Dvaraka Pitha, one of the four pithas (religious centres) established by Adi Shankara (686-717 CE) who pioneered unification of Hindu religious beliefs in the country.

== Transport ==
- Air: The nearest airport are Porbandar Airport (PBD) is about 95 km from Dwarka and Jamnagar Airport (JGA) is located approximately 110 kilometres away.
- Train: The city is served by Dwarka Railway Station (DMK), which is part of Western Railway Zone. The train station is about 2 km from the temple.
- Road: Dwarka is well connected to the rest of Gujarat through highway NH-947.

== Awards ==
The Dwarkadhish Jagat Mandir was awarded the certificate of "World Amazing Place" on 22 March 2021 by the World Talent Organization, New Jersey, USA.

== See also ==
- Shri Keshavraiji Temple, Bet Dwarka
- Rukmini Devi Temple, Dwarka Gujarat
- Radha Damodar Temple, Junagadh

== Bibliography ==
- Desai, Anjali H. (2007). India Guide Gujarat. India Guide Publications. ISBN 978-0-9789517-0-2.
- Paramāra, Thomasa (1996). Temples of Gujarat Built During the Mughal Period. Thomas B. Parmar.
- UNESCO World Cultural Heritage Site status, report on Indian Express newspaper website
- Underwater remains near Dwarakadheesh temple, on website of National Institute of Oceanography
- Brockman, Norbert C. (2011). Encyclopedia of Sacred Places. California: ABC-CLIO, LLC. ISBN 978-1-59884-655-3.
- Gwynne, Paul (2009). World Religions in Practice: A Comparative Introduction. Oxford: Blackwell Publication. ISBN 978-1-4051-6702-4.
