= Wagher =

Social group of Gujarat, India

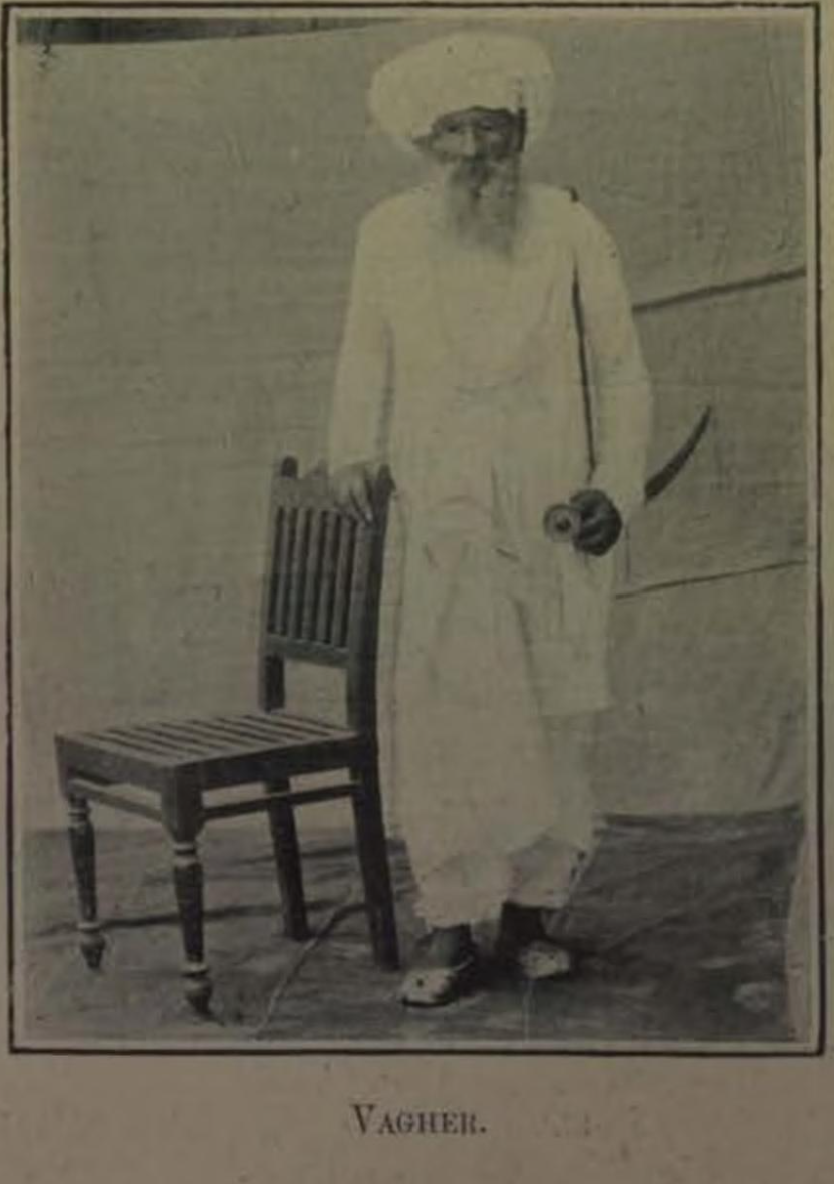
A photograph of a Vagher man, 1911

Wagher, Vagher or Waghir (Gujarati: ISO 15919: Vāghēr or ) is a jāti from the Saurashtra and Kutch regions of Gujarat in India. They speak Kutchi as a mother tongue.

== History ==
=== Rebellion against the British East India Company ===
After the British East India Company bombarded the temple of Krishna in Bet Dwarka and sacked the town in the 1800s, the Hindu Waghers of Okha rose up against the company. On the seas they took to piracy and targeted British ships. Attempts at peace were thwarted after the British set a trap for Muru Manek, one of the Wagher leaders, with the pretext of negotiating disarmament. Also, during the course of the war the Wagher leader Jodha Manek and his soldiers seized Kodinar. The Waghers made their final stand at the Aabhparo peak in the Barda Hills, during the course of which the British poisoned natural water reservoirs in order to draw the Waghers out. In the aftermath of this war the British occupied of the region of Okha and transferred it to Baroda State.

British colonial authorities held racist views towards the Waghers, with Kincaid describing them as a 'tribe born of thieves'. Colonial theories attempted to discredit the Hindu identity of martial jātis including the Waghers and attempted to find or concoct theories suggestive of a foreign origin based on scant evidence.

== Present circumstances ==
The community still speaks Kutchi, and are endogamous. They have several clans, the main ones being the Kamora, Vagha, Kara, Manek, Ker, Sumaniya, Gad, Giggla, Mapani, Jam, Tilayat and Bhagad. The community maintain the practice of clan exogamy. They are a major landowning community in the Dwarka sub-division of Jamnagar District. The community are still mainly farmers, but like other Gujarat castes, they have migrated to other parts of India and overseas in search of work.

Many Muslim Waghers from Kutch are employed in fishing. In 1993 the Mandal Commission classified the Waghers as an Other Backward Class.

== Notable people ==
- Ram Singh Malam – 18th Century navigator, architect and craftsman from Kutch

== See also ==
- Mer
- Jadeja
