= Okha, India =

Okha Okha Port
- City
- Location in Gujarat, India
- Coordinates: 22°28′0″N 69°4′0″E
- Country: India
- State: Gujarat
- District: Devbhumi Dwarka
- Named for: Usha

Government
  - Type: Municipal Council
  - Body: Okha Municipality

Area
  - Total: 5 km^{2} (1.9 sq mi)

Population (2011)
  - Total: 62,052
  - Density: 12,000/km^{2} (32,000/sq mi)

Languages
  - Official: Gujarati; Hindi
- Time zone: UTC+5:30 (IST)
- PIN: 361350
- Vehicle registration: GJ-37

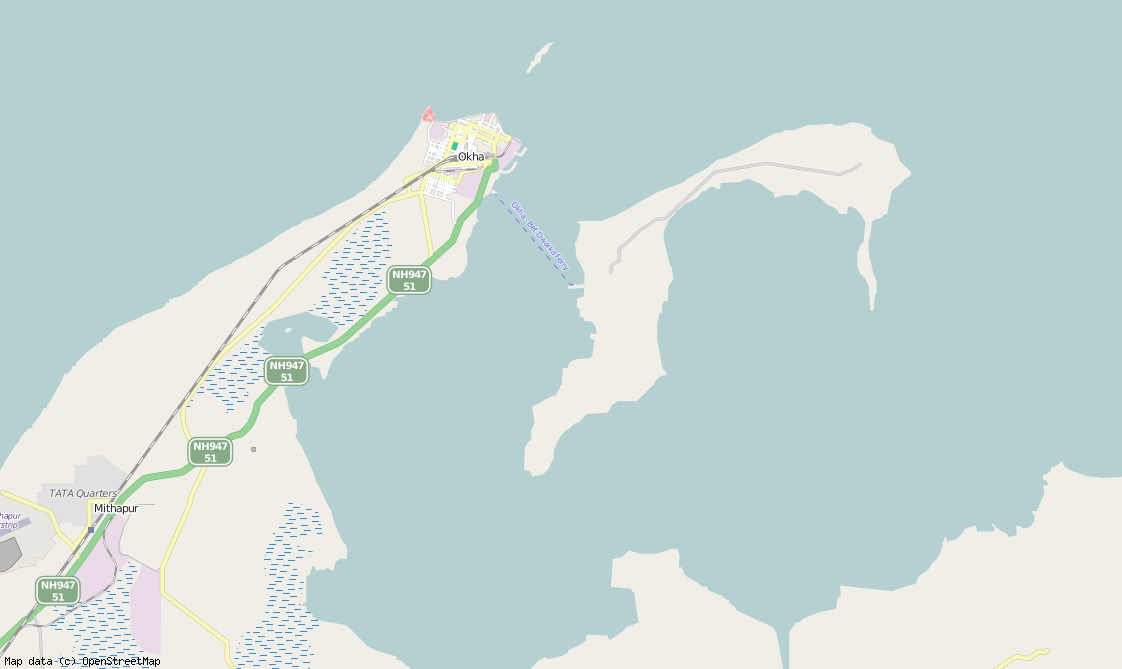
Map of Okha in Gujarat, India

Okha is a coastal city in Devbhoomi Dwarka district of Gujarat state in India. Dwarka is situated 30 km south, and Bet Dwarka island is situated 2.9 km across a small creek from Okha port. Okha port is a major Hindu pilgrimage site due to a temple dedicated to Krishna.

== History ==
The city is mentioned in ancient Indian epic literature. It is associated with the story of the marriage of Aniruddha, the grandson of Krishna and Usha (called Okha in Gujarati), the daughter of Banasur. 18th century Gujarati Akhyana entitled Okhaharan by Premanand Bhatt recounts the same story.

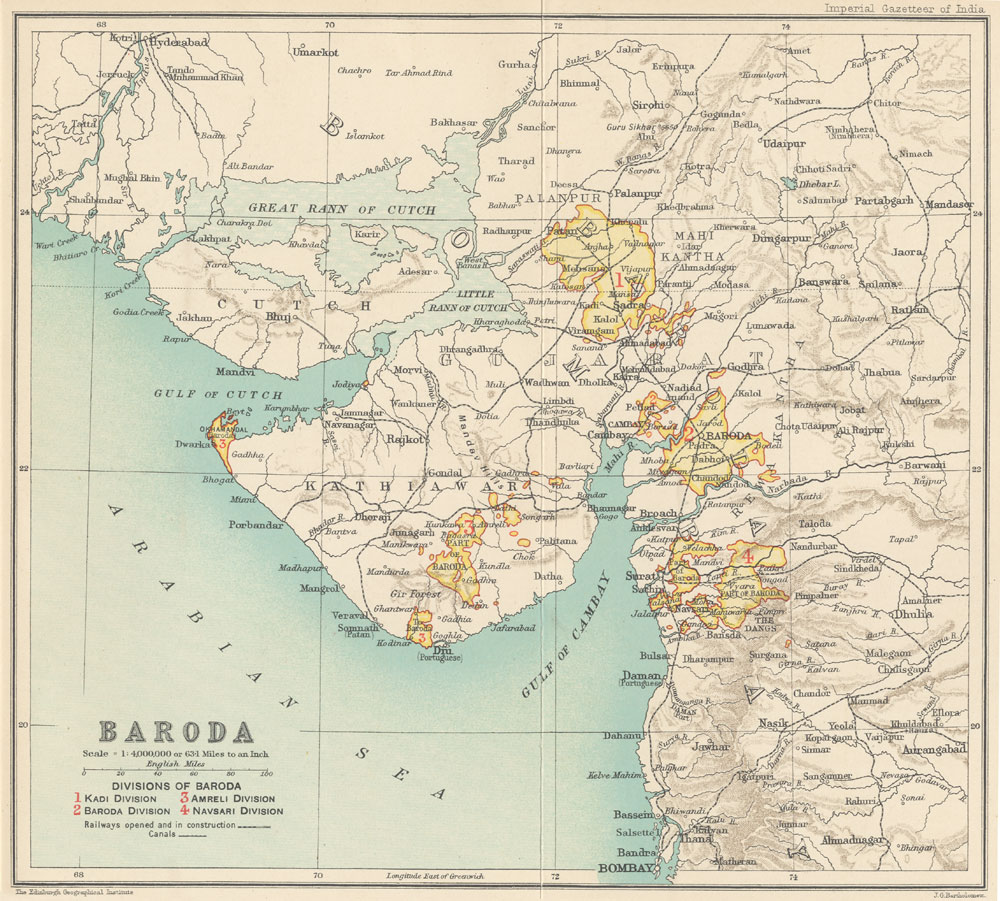
Okha under Baroda state, Amreli division, 1909

Okha, along with Dwarka and Bet Dwarka, was under Gaekwad of the Baroda State. During Indian rebellion of 1857, the Vaghers captured the region in 1858. Later by joint offensive of British, Gaekwad and other princely states troops ousted the rebels and recaptured the region in 1859.

== Geography ==
Okha is situated on a narrow strip of land that projects into the sea. It is surrounded by sea on three sides and has a sandy beach on the Arabian Sea coast. It has a sea port on the lee side. But Dwarka lies on the other side of a small creek from Okha port.

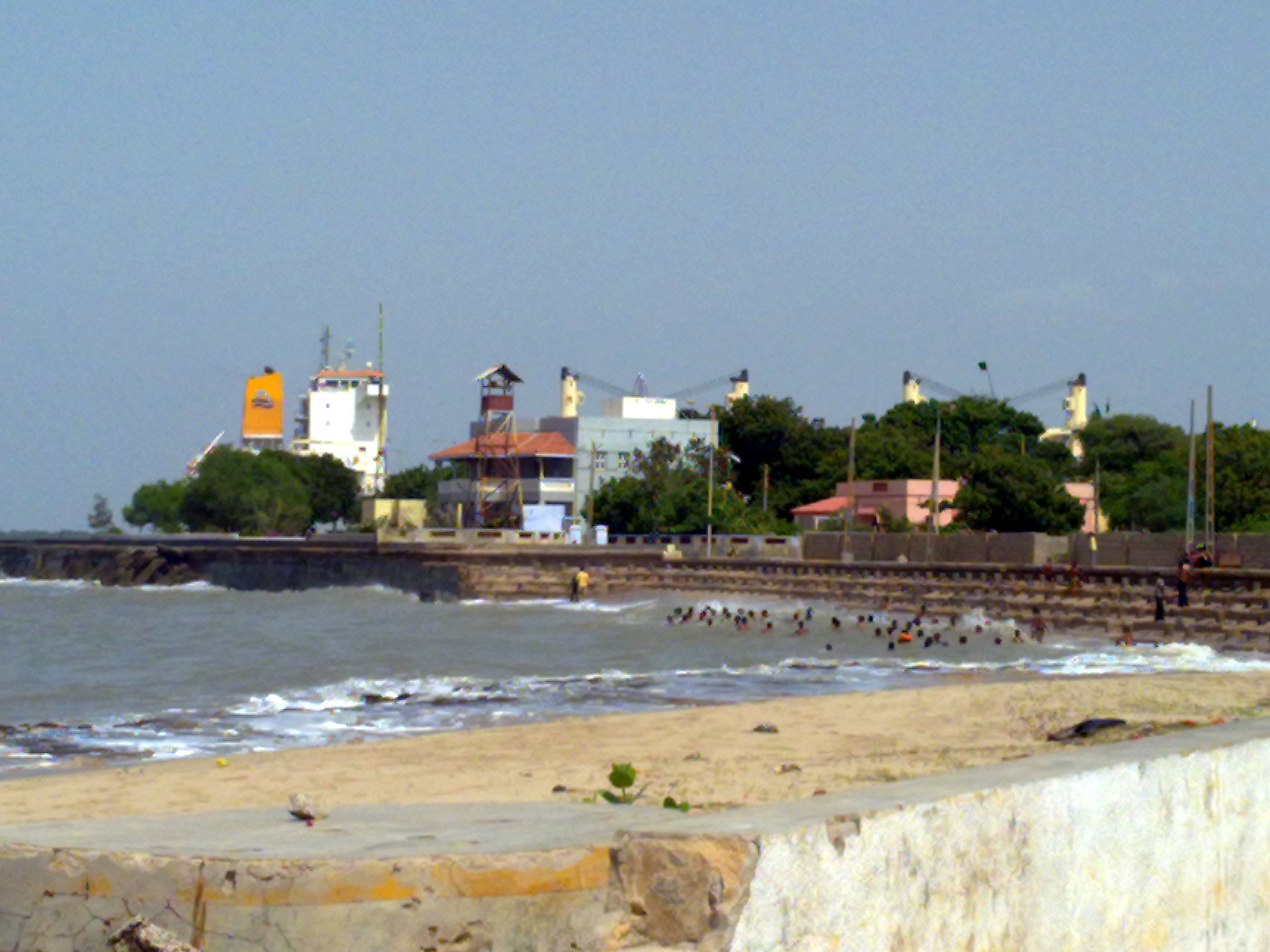
Okha Port, Gujarat

== Climate ==
Climate data for Okha (1991–2020, extremes 1963–2020)
Month	Jan	Feb	Mar	Apr	May	Jun	Jul	Aug	Sep	Oct	Nov	Dec	Year
Record high °C (°F)	30.4 (86.7)	33.3 (91.9)	34.8 (94.6)	36.6 (97.9)	37.5 (99.5)	39.8 (103.6)	36.0 (96.8)	34.3 (93.7)	34.7 (94.5)	35.7 (96.3)	33.8 (92.8)	31.1 (88.0)	39.8 (103.6)
Mean daily maximum °C (°F)	24.8 (76.6)	25.9 (78.6)	28.3 (82.9)	30.9 (87.6)	32.8 (91.0)	33.4 (92.1)	31.8 (89.2)	30.6 (87.1)	30.9 (87.6)	31.2 (88.2)	30.0 (86.0)	26.9 (80.4)	29.8 (85.6)
Mean daily minimum °C (°F)	18.8 (65.8)	19.8 (67.6)	22.3 (72.1)	24.9 (76.8)	27.1 (80.8)	28.2 (82.8)	27.2 (81.0)	26.1 (79.0)	25.8 (78.4)	25.5 (77.9)	24.0 (75.2)	20.8 (69.4)	24.2 (75.6)
Record low °C (°F)	10.0 (50.0)	10.9 (51.6)	15.9 (60.6)	20.8 (69.4)	23.3 (73.9)	20.4 (68.7)	20.9 (69.6)	22.4 (72.3)	21.7 (71.1)	20.2 (68.4)	17.8 (64.0)	14.1 (57.4)	10.0 (50.0)
Average rainfall mm (inches)	1.5 (0.06)	0.8 (0.03)	0.4 (0.02)	0.0 (0.0)	1.6 (0.06)	48.1 (1.89)	219.9 (8.66)	134.0 (5.28)	96.9 (3.81)	5.7 (0.22)	3.3 (0.13)	0.3 (0.01)	512.6 (20.18)
Average rainy days	0.2	0.2	0.1	0.0	0.2	2.1	6.5	5.1	2.9	0.4	0.3	0.1	18.0
Average relative humidity (%) (at 17:30 IST)	58	64	70	73	74	74	78	79	77	72	61	58	70
Mean monthly sunshine hours	288.3	276.9	285.2	300.0	294.5	207.0	105.4	133.3	234.0	294.5	288.0	266.6	2,973.7
Mean daily sunshine hours	9.3	9.8	9.2	10.0	9.5	6.9	3.4	4.3	7.8	9.5	9.6	8.6	8.2
Source: India Meteorological Department (sun 1971-2000)

== Economy ==
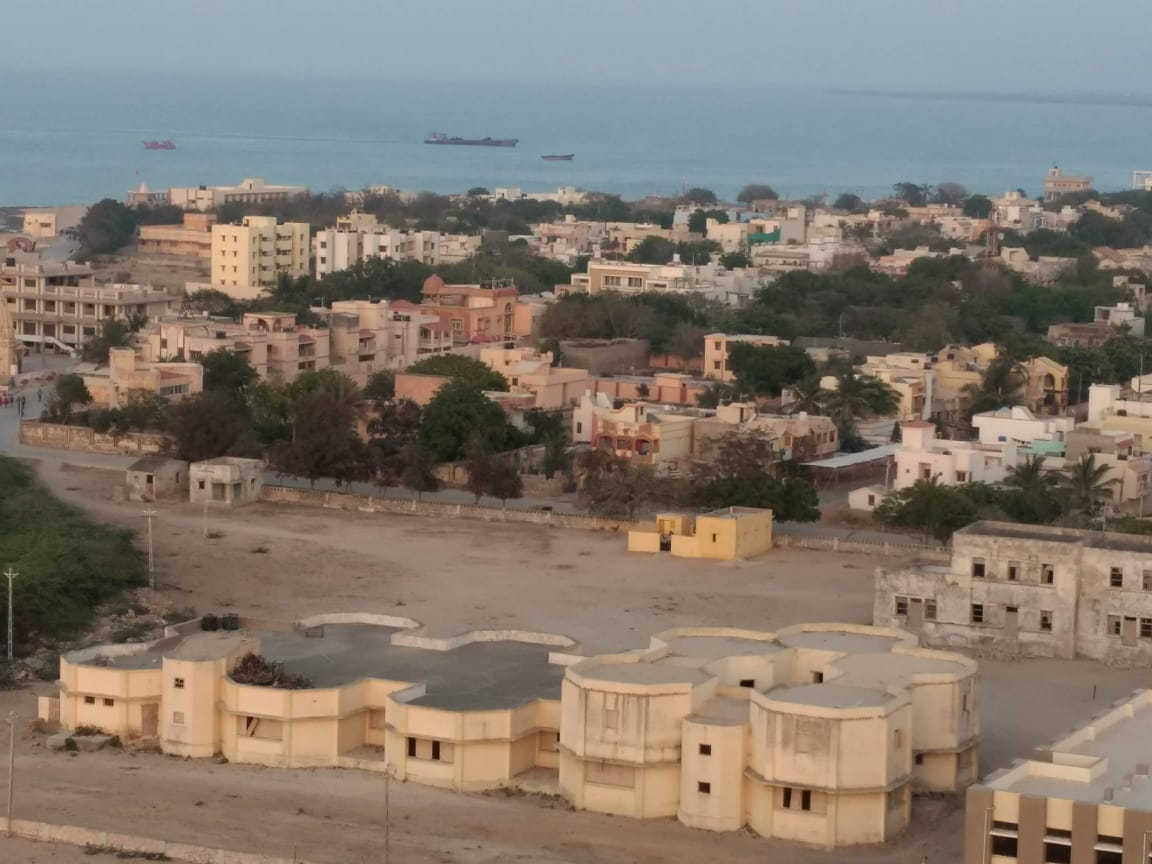
Okha

Okha is a busy and historical port in Gujarat strategically located. Historically it was the first port on west coast of India that a ship travelling along the coast from Arabia encountered. Indian Navy, Indian Coastguard, Indian Customs and Gujarat marine police have their operational command centre in Okha. Okha port imports mainly lignite from the Indonesia for the thermal power stations of Gujarat and for soda ash plant of Tata Chemicals. Okha has an automobile-assembly plant. Fishing and salt processing are also industries. Some of the major companies in Okha is Tata Chemicals at Mithapur, about 10 km away towards Dwarka city.

Okha is connected by railway at Okha railway station, and by bus, to major cities of Gujarat and the rest of India. The population of the city was estimated at 18,885 in 2001.

== Schools ==
There are four main schools in Okha.

- Kendriya Vidyalaya, Okha
- Okha Gram Panchayat School
- V A English Medium School
- Bansi Highschool

== Tourism ==
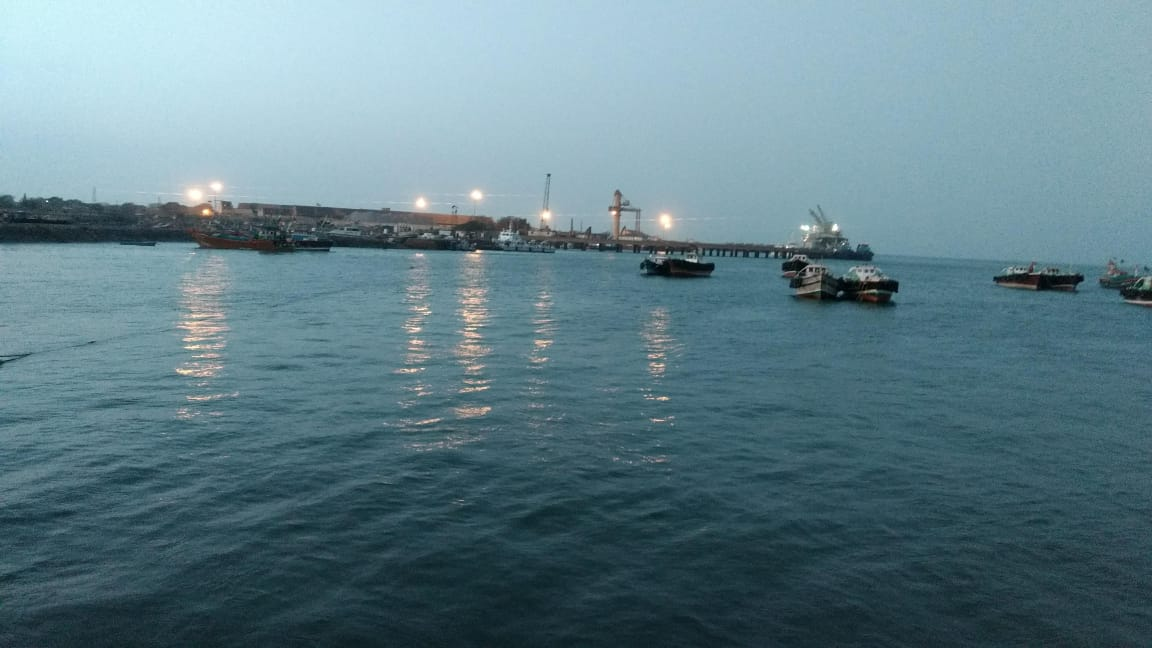
Okha, Dwarka

Bet Dwarka, an island in the Arabian Sea off the coast of Dwarka. Considered the original residence of Krishna, Bet Dwarka was the old port during the ancient times of Krishna before the Okha port was developed in Dwarka. The temple built here is credited to the religious Guru Vallabhacharya of the "Pushtimarg Sampradaya". Rice is the traditional offering here to the deity as it is believed that Sudama offered rice to his childhood friend Krishna. There are also smaller shrines on Bet Dwarka which are dedicated to Shiva, Vishnu, Hanuman and Devi.[42] According to a legend, Vishnu killed the demon Shankhasura on this island. There are temples of Vishnu in the incarnation of matsya, or fish. Other shrines here are of Rukmini, Trivikrama, Devaki, Radha, Lakshmi, Satyabhama, Jambavati, Lakshmi Narayan, and many other gods.[39]. Hanuman Dandi temple is another notable temple located in Bet Dwarka, 6 kilometers (3.7 mi) away from Dhwarkadhish Temple, Bet Dwarka. The temple is deified with many images of Hanuman and his son Makardhwaja. The legend associated with the birth of a son to Hanuman, who is considered celibate, is that the sweat of Hanuman was consumed by a crocodile which then gave birth to a son named Makardhwaja.[42] The Jethwa Rajput clan of Kshatriyas claim their descent from Makardhwaja.
