= Bet Dwarka =

- Island
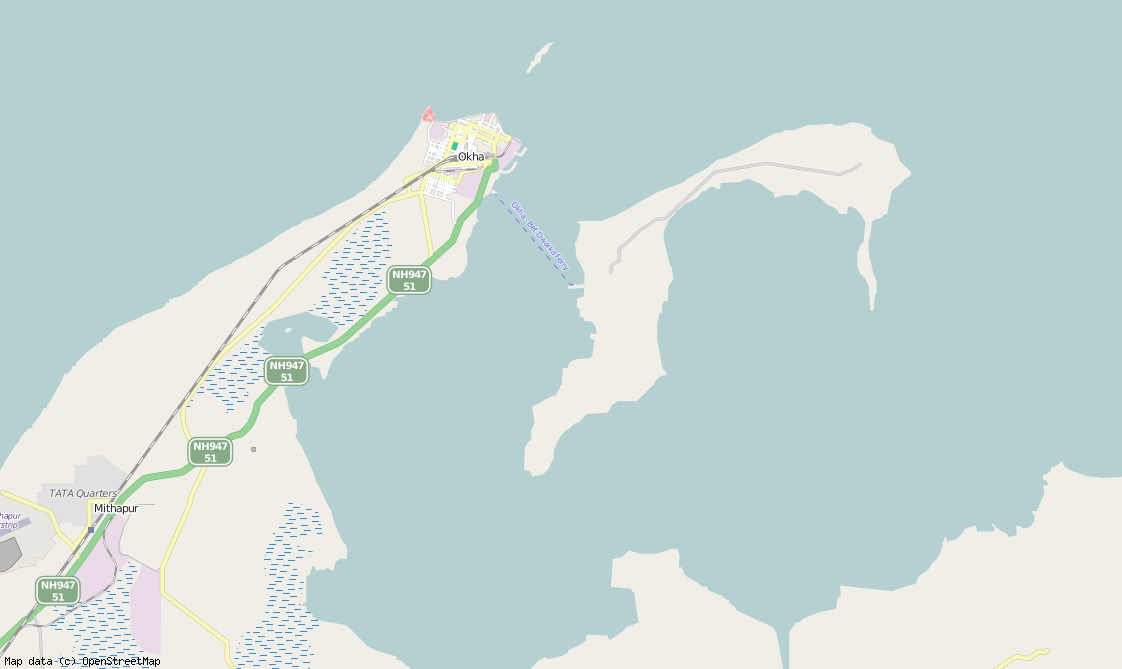
- Map of Bet Dwarka

- Location in Gujarat, India Bet Dwarka (India)
- Coordinates: 22°26′58″N 69°7′2″E
- Country: India
- State: Gujarat
- District: Devbhoomi Dwarka district
- City: Dwarka

Area
  - Total: 11 km^{2} (4.2 sq mi)

Population (2011)
  - Total: 15,000
  - Density: 1,400/km^{2} (3,500/sq mi)

Languages
  - Official: Gujarati, Hindi
- Time zone: UTC+5:30 (IST)
- Vehicle registration: GJ-37
- Website: gujaratindia.com

Bet Dwarka (also spelled Beyt Dwarka) or Shankhodhar is an inhabited island at the mouth of the Gulf of Kutch, situated 2 km (1 mi) off the coast of the town of Okha, Gujarat, India, and 25 km (16 mi) north of the city of Dwarka. Northeast to southwest, the island measures 8 km (5 mi) long and averaging 2 km (1 mi) wide. The island's name "Shankhodhar" derives from the fact that the island is a large source of conch shells (Hindi: शंख, romanized: shankha, lit. 'conch or scallop shell').

== History ==
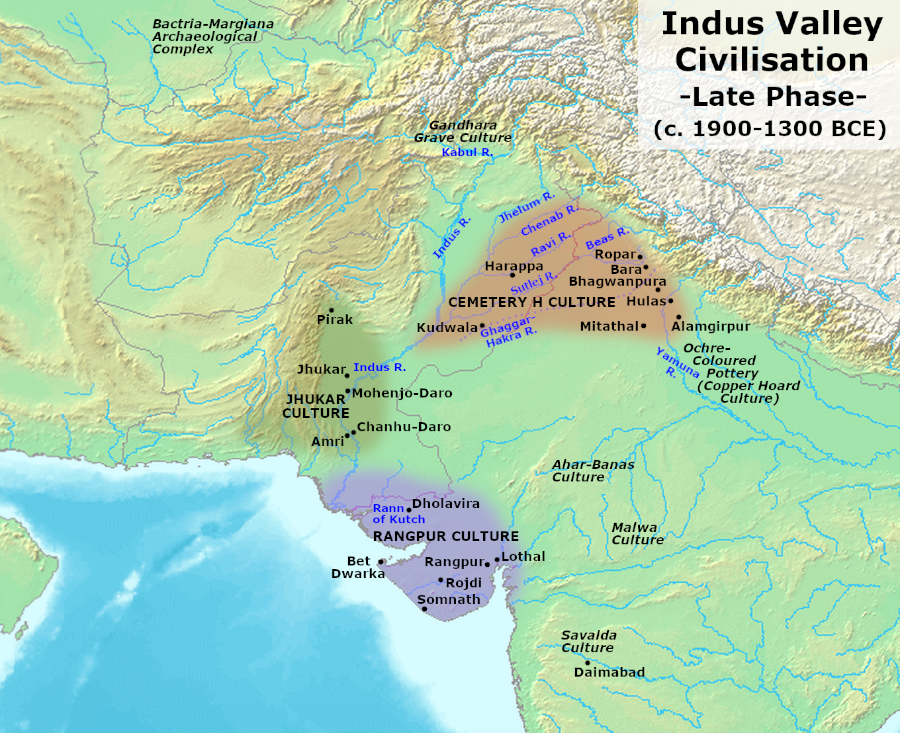
Bet Dwarka marked with other sites of Indus Valley Civilization, Late Phase (1900–1300 BCE)

Bet Dwarka is considered to be part of the ancient city of Dvārakā. In Indian epic literature such as the Mahabharata and the Skanda Purana, this city is the abode of Krishna. Gujarati scholar Umashankar Joshi suggested that Antardvipa in the Sabha Parva of the Mahabharata can be identified as Bet Dwarka, as the Yadavas of Dwarka are said to have travelled to it by boat.

Undersea archaeological remains suggest the existence of a settlement during the Late Harappan period of Indus Valley civilization, or immediately after it. The settlement can be reliably dated to the time of the Maurya Empire, as a part of Okha Mandal or Kushdwip area. Dwarka is mentioned in a copper inscription (dated 574 CE) of Simhaditya, the son of Varahdas (the king of Dwarka) and the minister of the city of Vallabhi during the Maitraka dynasty.

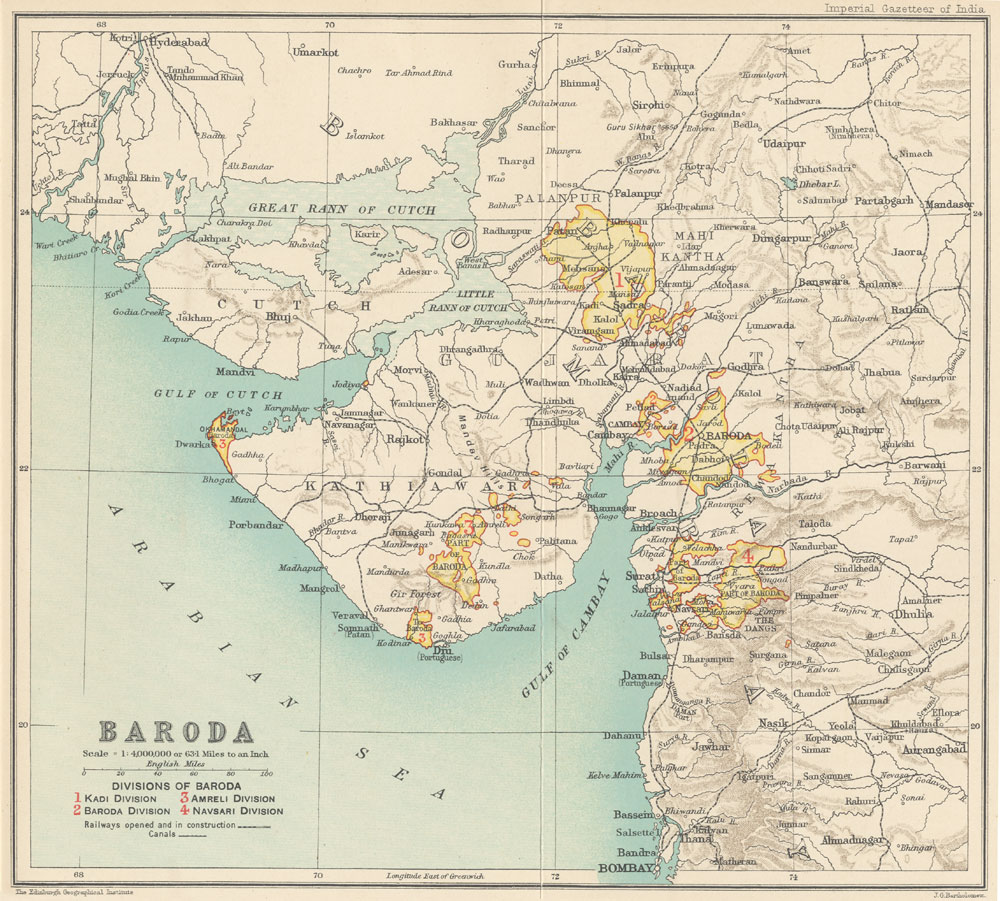
Bet Dwarka under Baroda state, Amreli division, 1909

In 1473, Mahmud Begada of Gujarat Sultanate conquered Dwarka and Bet Dwarka marking the end of the Rajput Rathore dynasty of Dwarka. Gujarat Sultanate's border extended to the Arabian sea. It marked the beginning of Muslim rule over the region.

During the 18th century, the island, along with Okhamandal region, was controlled by the Gaekwads of Baroda. During the Indian rebellion of 1857, the Vaghers captured this region. In 1859, through a joint offensive with the British, Gaekwad and other princely state troops ousted the rebels and recaptured the region.

After Indian Independence in 1947, the area was integrated into the Saurashtra State. Later, Saurashtra merged with Bombay State under the state reorganization plans. When Gujarat was created from the bifurcation of Bombay State, Bet Dwarka was under the jurisdiction of the Jamnagar district of Gujarat. In 2013, it became part of the Devbhumi Dwarka district, created from the Jamnagar district.

== Archaeology ==
During investigations undertaken in the 1980s, the remains of earthen pots and other artifacts of the Late Harappan period were found. In 1982, a 580-metre (1,900 ft)-long protection wall dating from 1500 BCE was found, which is believed to have been damaged and submerged following a sea storm. The artifacts recovered include a Late Harappan seal, an inscribed jar and a mold of a coppersmith, and a copper fishhook. The shipwrecks and stone anchors found during excavations suggested historic trade relation with Romans. The temples on the island were built around the end of the 18th century.

=== Places of worship ===
Dwarkadhish Temple and Shri Keshavraiji Temple are major temples of Krishna on the island. Additional pilgrimage places include Hanuman Dandi temple, Vaishnav Mahaprabhu Bethak, and a gurdwara. The small temple of Abhaya Mata is situated on the southwest side of the island.

== Access ==
Traditionally, Bet Dwarka was reached by ferry service from Okha.

In February 2024, Okha–Beyt Dwarka Signature Bridge also known as Sudarshan Setu has been completed and inaugurated by Prime Minister Narendra Modi. The is first sea bridge in Gujarat , it is of 2 km (1 mi) length and estiamted to have of cost of ₹400 crore..

The island is made of sandstone and is surrounded by several sand beaches. On the eastern side is a thin peninsula known as Dunny Point. Bet Dwarka is the first place in Gujarat developed for ecotourism, and temporary camps are set up for tourism during the summer.

== Gallery ==
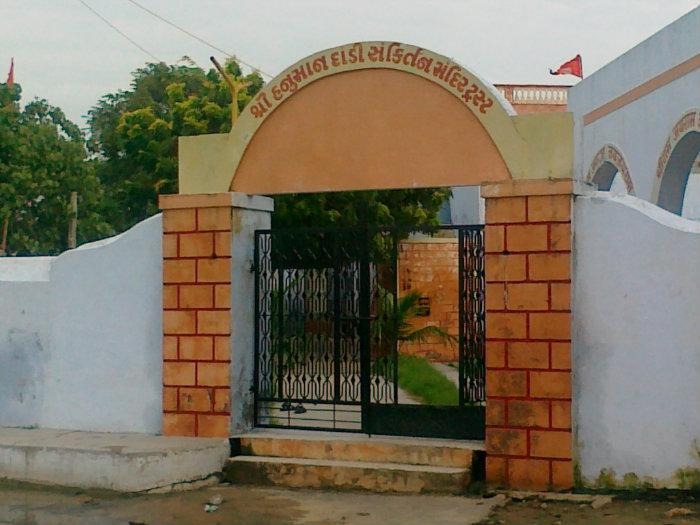
Hanuman Dandi temple

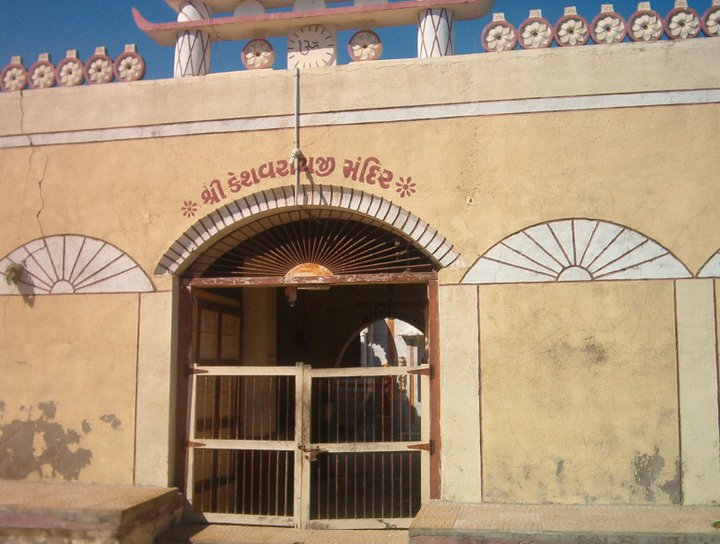
Shri Keshavraiji Temple Main Gate

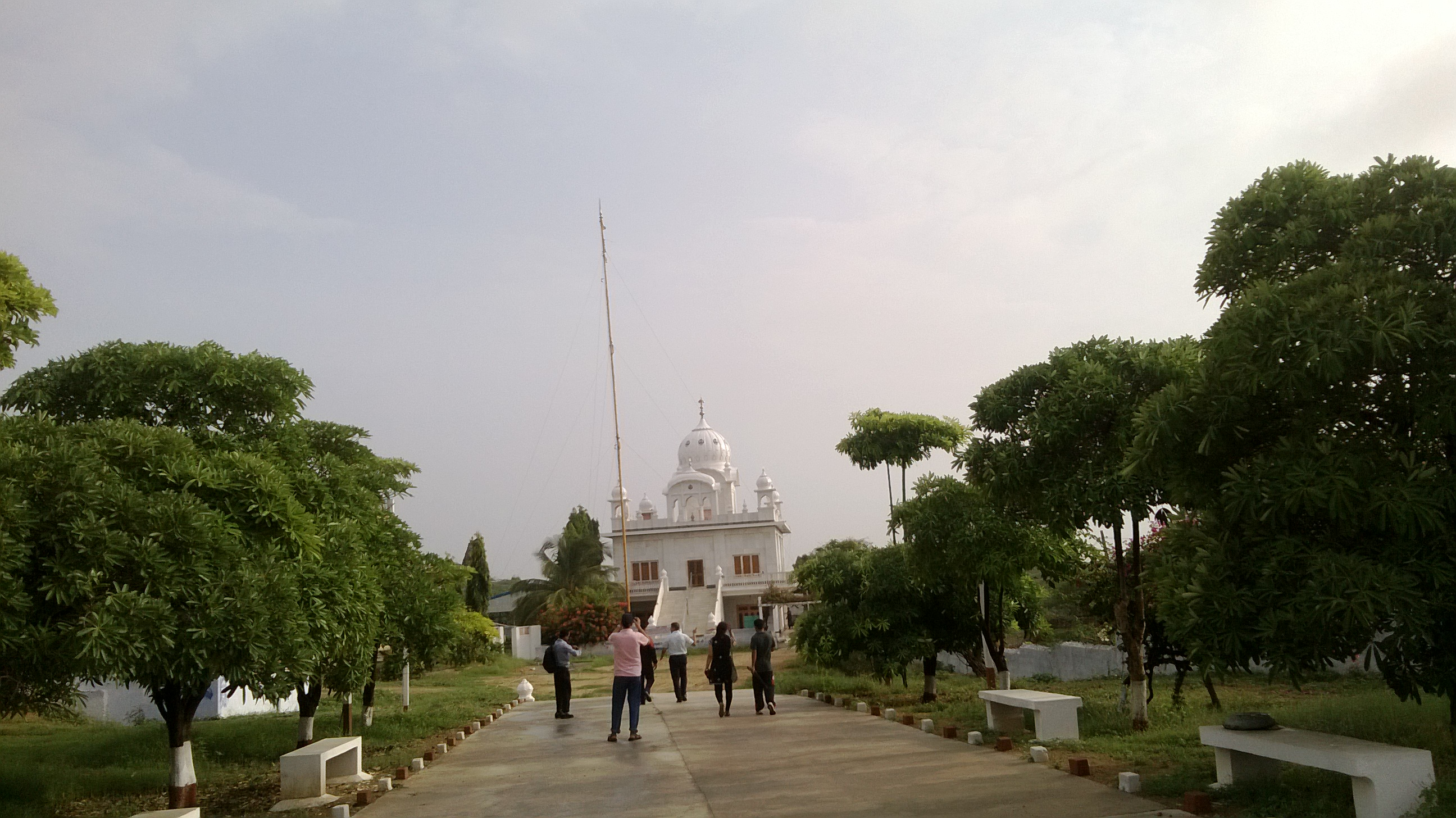
Gurudwara Bet Dwarka

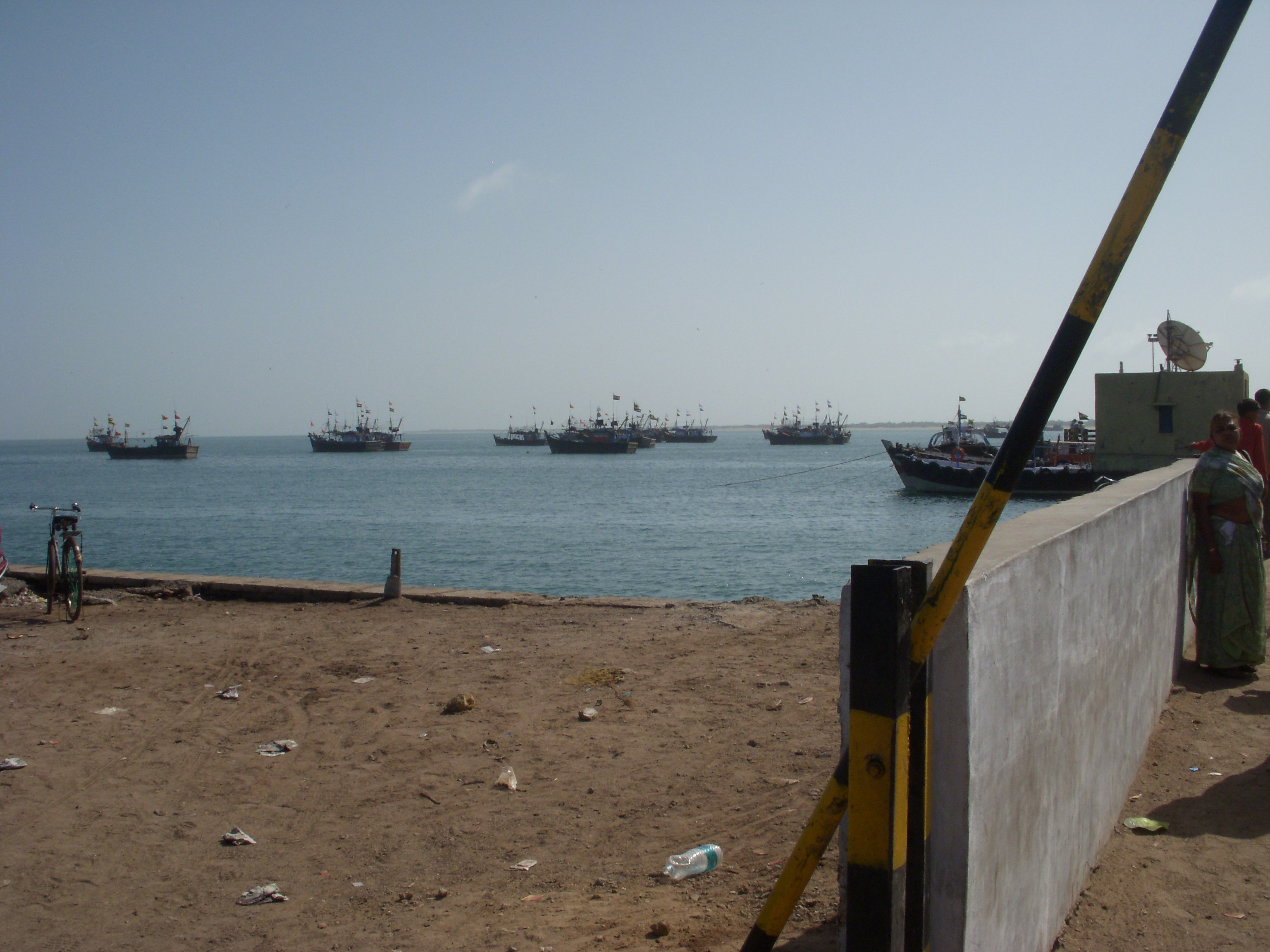
Sea from Bet Dwarka

== See also ==
- Shivrajpur beach

== Bibliography ==
- S. R. Rao (1991). "Further excavations of the submerged city of Dwarka". Recent Advances in Marine Archaeology: Proceedings of the second Indian Conference on Marine Archaeology of Indian Ocean Countries, January 1990. National Institute Of Oceanography. pp. 51–59.
- Gaur, A.S., Sundaresh, P. Gudigar, Sila Tripati, K.H. Vora and S.N. Bandodkar (2000) Recent underwater explorations at Dwarka and surroundings of Okha Mandal, Man and Environment, XXV(1): 67–74.
- Gaur, A.S. and Sundaresh (2003) Onshore Excavation at Bet Dwarka Island, in the Gulf of Kachchh, Gujarat, Man and Environment, XXVIII(1): 57–66.
