= Shivrajpur beach =

Shivrajpur Beach
- Blue Flag Beach
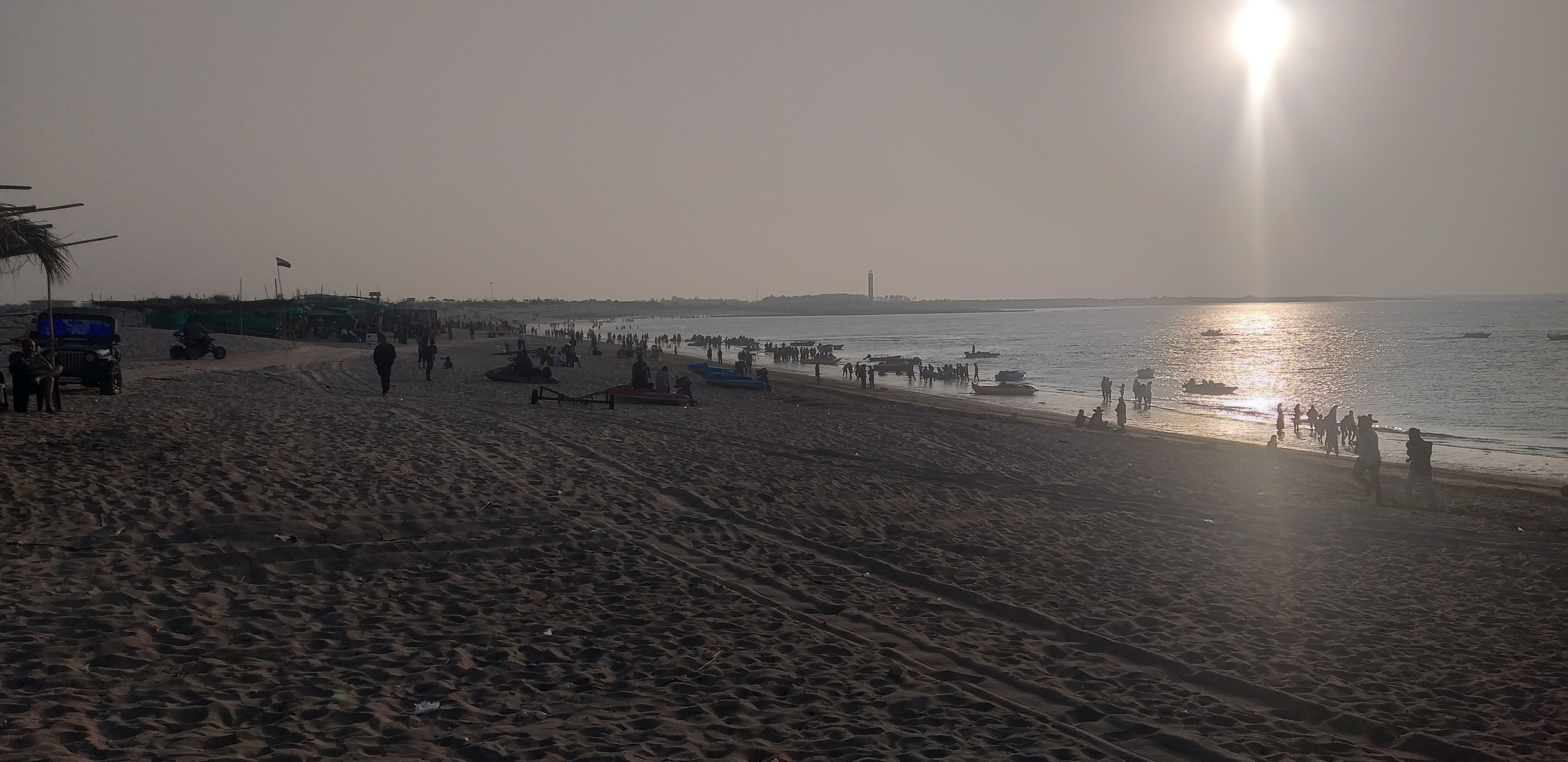
- Evening view before Sunset

- Location within India
- Coordinates: 22.33°N 68.95°E
- Country: India
- State: Gujarat
- District: Devbhumi Dwarka
- Time zone: UTC+5:30 (Indian Standard Time)
- Postal code: 361335
- Website: https://www.gujarattourism.com/saurashtra/devbhoomi-dwarka/shivrajpur-beach.html

Shivrajpur beach, near Shivrajpur village, is located in the Devbhumi Dwarka district of Gujarat, India. It is a white-sand beach with azure, clear water. The water is shallow. It was awarded the Blue Flag beach certification in October 2020 by the Foundation for Environment Education, a Denmark-based voluntary organization.

Shivrajpur village was formed by the Baroda State during the early 19th century. It is believed that the ruler of Kachchh or Katuch, Maharao Deshalji, constructed a small fort with an 11-meter-high black masonry unlit beacon. The purpose of the fort was to provide safety and shelter to the Kachchhi vessels. Facilities like emergency repairs for boats, rations and drinking water were also provided. There is a lighthouse near the beach named Kacchighadh Lighthouse. A battery-operated flashing light was placed at the top of the cabin in 1977, which was the first light in the region. The earthquake on 26 January 2001 left the lighthouse damaged, but it was restored immediately.

== Tourism ==
After the beach was given the Blue Flag award, the Government of Gujarat has decided to spend ₹1 billion (US$10 million) to develop Shivrajpur beach in two phases.

In January 2021, Gujarat Chief Minister Late. Vijay Rupani laid the foundation stone and the ceremony for tourist-centric projects.

In the first phase, a bicycle track, pathway, parking area, drinking water facility, toilet blocks, arrival plaza and tourist facility center were to be developed at the cost of ₹200 million. Under the second phase, further facilities will be added to make it an "international level" beach. Vijay Rupani said, "Shivrajpur beach will have better facilities than Goa".

In July 2022, CM Bhupendrabhai Patel visited the beach to review the facilities, and Milind Soman visited the beach.

As per figures from Government of Gujarat, 678,647 persons in 2023 and 680,325 persons in 2024 visited Shivrajpur beach.

The Gujarat government also wants to develop a caravan park near the beach.

== Activities ==
The beach is accessible by airplane, train, and road.

Places of interest near Shivrajpur beach include Dwarkadhish Temple, Bet Dwarka, Nageshvara Jyotirlinga, and the Rukmini Devi Temple.

== See also ==
- Sudarshan Setu
- Hanuman Dandi temple
- Dwarkadhish Temple
- Rukmini Devi Temple
