= Dandi Beach =

Beach in Dandi, Gujarat, India

Coordinates: 20.8761°N 72.8031°E

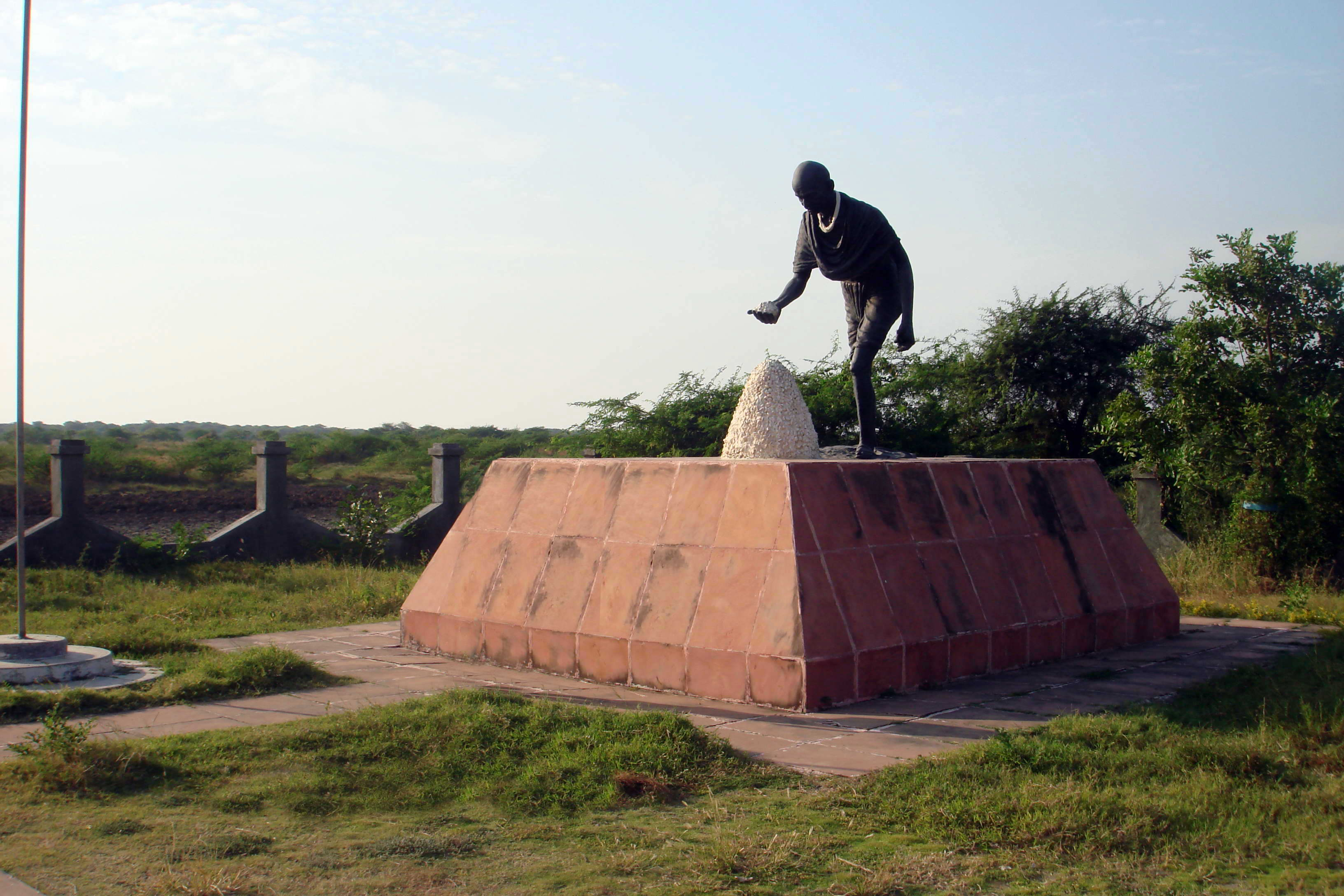
Monument of Mahatma Gandhi at Dandi

Dandi Beach is one of the prominent beaches located in Dandi village, Gujarat, India. Dandi beach is one of the cleanest beaches in the Arabian Sea. Dandi Beach is historically prominent as Mahatma Gandhi led the salt sathyagraha from Sabarmati Ashram (Ahmedabad) to Dandi. This is the beach where Mahatma Gandhi broke the salt tax law of the British after the Salt March.

== Monuments of Gandhi ==
Two monuments of Mahatma Gandhiji are placed in Dandi Beach to express the importance of Dandi Beach in the history of India. One monument is like the India gate commemorating the success of Gandhi breaking the salt law. The next monument is the statue of Gandhi holding the saline mud.
