= BAFTA Award for Best Sound =

British film award

- Awarded for: Best Sound
- Location: United Kingdom
- Presented by: British Academy of Film and Television Arts
- Currently held by: Gareth John, Al Nelson, Gwendolyn Yates Whittle, Gary A. Rizzo and Juan Peralta for F1 (2025)
- Website: https://www.bafta.org/

The BAFTA Award for Best Sound is a film award that is presented by the British Academy of Film and Television Arts (BAFTA) to sound designers, sound editors, sound engineers, and sound mixers. It has been presented at the annual British Academy Film Awards since 1969.

In the following lists, the titles and names in bold with a gold background are the winners and recipients respectively; those not in bold are the nominees. The years given are those in which the films under consideration were released, not the year of the ceremony, which always takes place the following year.

== Winners and nominees ==
indicates the winner

=== 1960s ===
Year	Film	Recipient(s)
Best Soundtrack
**1968** (22nd)	**2001: A Space Odyssey**	**Winston Ryder**
**1968** (22nd)	The Charge of the Light Brigade	Simon Kaye
**1968** (22nd)	Closely Observed Trains	Jiří Pavlík
**1968** (22nd)	The Lion in Winter	Chris Greenham
**1968** (22nd)	Oliver!	John Cox and Bob Jones
**1969** (23rd)	**Oh! What a Lovely War**	**Don Challis and Simon Kaye**
**1969** (23rd)	Battle of Britain	Ted Mason and Jim Shields
**1969** (23rd)	Bullitt	Ed Scheid
**1969** (23rd)	Isadora / Women in Love	Terry Rawlings ^{[A]}

=== 1970s ===
Year	Film	Recipient(s)
**1970** (24th)	**Butch Cassidy and the Sundance Kid**	**Don Hall, David Dockendorf and William Edmondson**
**1970** (24th)	M*A*S*H	Don Hall, David Dockendorf and Bernard Freericks
**1970** (24th)	Ryan's Daughter	Winston Ryder and Gordon McCallum
**1970** (24th)	Patton	Don Hall, Douglas Williams and Don Bassman
**1971** (25th)	**Death in Venice**	**Vittorio Trentino and Giuseppe Muratori**
**1971** (25th)	Fiddler on the Roof	Les Wiggins, David Hildyard and Gordon McCallum
**1971** (25th)	The Go-Between	Garth Craven, Peter Handford and Hugh Strain
**1971** (25th)	Sunday Bloody Sunday	David Campling, Simon Kaye and Gerry Humphreys
**1972** (26th)	**Cabaret**	**David Hildyard, Robert Knudson and Arthur Piantadosi**
**1972** (26th)	A Clockwork Orange	Brian Blamey, John Jordan and Bill Rowe
**1972** (26th)	Deliverance	Jim Atkinson, Walter Goss and Doug E. Turner
**1972** (26th)	The French Connection	Christopher Newman and Theodore Soderberg
**1973** (27th)	**Jesus Christ Superstar**	**Les Wiggins, Gordon McCallum and Keith Grant**
**1973** (27th)	The Day of the Jackal	Nicholas Stevenson and Bob Allen
**1973** (27th)	The Discreet Charm of the Bourgeoisie	Guy Villette and Luis Buñuel
**1973** (27th)	Don't Look Now	Rodney Holland, Peter Davies and Bob Jones
**1974** (28th)	**The Conversation**	**Art Rochester, Nat Boxer, Michael Evje and Walter Murch**
**1974** (28th)	Earthquake	Melvin Metcalfe Sr. and Ronald Pierce
**1974** (28th)	The Exorcist	Christopher Newman, Jean-Louis Ducarme, Robert Knudson, Frederick Brown, Bob Fine, Ross Taylor, Ron Nagle, Doc Siegel, Gonzalo Gavira and Hal Landaker
**1974** (28th)	Gold	Rydal Love, Michael Crouch, John W. Mitchell and Gordon McCallum
**1975** (29th)	**Nashville**	**William A. Sawyer, James Webb, Chris McLaughlin and Richard Portman**
**1975** (29th)	Dog Day Afternoon	Jack Fitzstephens, Richard P. Cirincione, Sanford Rackow, Stephen A. Rotter, James Sabat and Dick Vorisek
**1975** (29th)	Jaws	John Carter and Robert Hoyt
**1975** (29th)	Rollerball	Les Wiggins, Archie Ludski, Derek Ball and Gordon McCallum
**1976** (30th)	**Bugsy Malone**	**Les Wiggins, Clive Winter and Ken Barker**
**1976** (30th)	All the President's Men	Milton Burrow, James Webb, Les Fresholtz, Arthur Piantadosi and Dick Alexander
**1976** (30th)	One Flew Over the Cuckoo's Nest	Mary McGlone, Robert Rutledge, Veronica Selver, Larry Jost and Mark Berger
**1976** (30th)	Picnic at Hanging Rock	Greg Bell and Don Connolly
**1977** (31st)	**A Bridge Too Far**	**Peter Horrocks, Gerry Humphreys, Simon Kaye, Robin O'Donoghue and Les Wiggins**
**1977** (31st)	Network	Jack Fitzstephens, Marc Laub, Sanford Rackow, James Sabat and Dick Vorisek
**1977** (31st)	New York, New York	Kay Rose, Michael Colgan, James Fritch, Larry Jost and Richard Portman
**1977** (31st)	A Star Is Born	Robert Glass, Robert Knudson, Marvin I. Kosberg, Tom Overton, Josef von Stroheim and Dan Wallin
**1978** (32nd)	**Star Wars**	**Sam Shaw, Robert Rutledge, Gordon Davidson, Gene Corso, Derek Ball, Don MacDougall, Bob Minkler, Ray West, Michael Minkler, Les Fresholtz, Richard Portman and Ben Burtt**
**1978** (32nd)	Close Encounters of the Third Kind	Gene Cantamessa, Robert Knudson, Don MacDougall, Robert Glass, Stephen Katz, Frank E. Warner and Richard Oswald
**1978** (32nd)	Saturday Night Fever	Michael Colgan, Les Lazarowitz, John Wilkinson, Robert W. Glass Jr. and John T. Reitz
**1978** (32nd)	Superman	Chris Greenham, Gordon McCallum, Peter Pennell, Mike Hopkins, Pat Foster, Stan Fiferman, John Foster, Roy Charman, Norman Bolland, Brian Marshall, Charles Schmitz, Richard Raguse and Chris Large
**1979** (33rd)	**Alien**	**Derrick Leather, Jim Shields and Bill Rowe**
**1979** (33rd)	Apocalypse Now	Nat Boxer, Richard P. Cirincione and Walter Murch
**1979** (33rd)	The Deer Hunter	Darin Knight, James J. Klinger and Richard Portman
**1979** (33rd)	Manhattan	James Sabat, Dan Sable and Jack Higgins

=== 1980s ===
Year	Film	Recipient(s)
Best Sound
**1980** (34th)	**Fame**	**Christopher Newman, Les Wiggins and Michael J. Kohut**
**1980** (34th)	All That Jazz	Maurice Schell, Christopher Newman and Dick Vorisek
**1980** (34th)	Don Giovanni	Jean-Louis Ducarme, Jacques Maumont and Michelle Nenny
**1980** (34th)	The Empire Strikes Back	Peter Sutton, Ben Burtt and Bill Varney
**1980** (34th)	The Rose	James Webb, Chris McLaughlin, Kay Rose and Theodore Soderberg
**1981** (35th)	**The French Lieutenant's Woman**	**Don Sharpe, Ivan Sharrock and Bill Rowe**
**1981** (35th)	Chariots of Fire	Clive Winter, Bill Rowe and Jim Shields
**1981** (35th)	Coal Miner's Daughter	Gordon Ecker, James R. Alexander, Richard Portman and Roger Heman Jr.
**1981** (35th)	Raiders of the Lost Ark	Roy Charman, Ben Burtt and Bill Varney
**1982** (36th)	**Pink Floyd – The Wall**	**James Guthrie, Eddy Joseph, Clive Winter, Graham V. Hartstone and Nicolas Le Messurier**
**1982** (36th)	Blade Runner	Peter Pennell, Bud Alper, Graham V. Hartstone and Gerry Humphreys
**1982** (36th)	E.T. the Extra-Terrestrial	Charles L. Campbell, Ben Burtt, Gene Cantamessa, Robert Knudson, Robert Glass and Don Digirolamo
**1982** (36th)	Gandhi	Jonathan Bates, Simon Kaye, Gerry Humphreys and Robin O'Donoghue
**1983** (37th)	**WarGames**	**Willie D. Burton, Michael J. Kohut and William Manger**
**1983** (37th)	Flashdance	James Webb, Robert Knudson, Robert Glass and Don Digirolamo
**1983** (37th)	La Traviata	Cesare D'Amico, Jean-Louis Ducarme, Claude Villand and Federico Savina
**1983** (37th)	Return of the Jedi	Ben Burtt, Randy Thom, Gary Summers and Tony Dawe
**1984** (38th)	**The Killing Fields**	**Ian Fuller, Clive Winter and Bill Rowe**
**1984** (38th)	Carmen	Carlos Faruolo, Alfonso Marcos and Antonio Illán
**1984** (38th)	Greystoke: The Legend of Tarzan, Lord of the Apes	Ivan Sharrock, Gordon McCallum, Les Wiggins and Roy Baker
**1984** (38th)	Indiana Jones and the Temple of Doom	Ben Burtt, Simon Kaye, Randy Thom and Laurel Ladevich
**1985** (39th)	**Amadeus**	**John Nutt, Christopher Newman and Mark Berger**
**1985** (39th)	Carmen	Hugues Darmois, Harald Maury, Dominique Hennequin and Bernard Leroux
**1985** (39th)	A Chorus Line	Jonathan Bates, Christopher Newman and Gerry Humphreys
**1985** (39th)	The Cotton Club	Edward Beyer, Jack C. Jacobsen and David Carroll
**1986** (40th)	**Out of Africa**	**Tom McCarthy Jr., Peter Handford and Chris Jenkins**
**1986** (40th)	Aliens	Don Sharpe, Roy Charman and Graham V. Hartstone
**1986** (40th)	The Mission	Ian Fuller, Bill Rowe and Clive Winter
**1986** (40th)	A Room with a View	Tony Lenny, Ray Beckett and Richard King
**1987** (41st)	**Cry Freedom**	**Jonathan Bates, Simon Kaye and Gerry Humphreys**
**1987** (41st)	Full Metal Jacket	Nigel Galt, Edward Tise and Andy Nelson
**1987** (41st)	Hope and Glory	Ron Davis, Peter Handford and John Hayward
**1987** (41st)	Radio Days	Robert Hein, James Sabat and Lee Dichter
**1988** (42nd)	**Empire of the Sun**	**Charles L. Campbell, Louis Edemann, Robert Knudson and Tony Dawe**
**1988** (42nd)	Bird	Alan Robert Murray, Robert G. Henderson, Willie D. Burton and Les Fresholtz
**1988** (42nd)	Good Morning, Vietnam	Bill Phillips, Clive Winter and Terry Porter
**1988** (42nd)	The Last Emperor	Ivan Sharrock, Bill Rowe and Les Wiggins
**1989** (43rd)	**Mississippi Burning**	**Bill Phillips, Danny Michael, Robert J. Litt, Elliot Tyson and Rick Kline**
**1989** (43rd)	Batman	Don Sharpe, Tony Dawe and Bill Rowe
**1989** (43rd)	Henry V	Campbell Askew, David Crozier and Robin O'Donoghue
**1989** (43rd)	Indiana Jones and the Last Crusade	Ben Burtt, Tony Dawe, Richard Hymns, Gary Summers and Shawn Murphy

=== 1990s ===
Year	Film	Recipient(s)
**1990** (44th)	**The Fabulous Baker Boys**	**J. Paul Huntsman, Stephan von Hase, Chris Jenkins, Gary Alexander and Doug Hemphill**
**1990** (44th)	Dick Tracy	Dennis Drummond, Thomas Causey, Chris Jenkins, David E. Campbell and Doug Hemphill
**1990** (44th)	The Hunt for Red October	Cecilia Häll, George Watters II, Richard Bryce Goodman and Don Bassman
**1990** (44th)	Wild at Heart	Randy Thom, Richard Hymns, Jon Huck and David Parker
**1991** (45th)	**Terminator 2: Judgment Day**	**Gary Rydstrom, Tom Johnson, Gary Summers and Lee Orloff**
**1991** (45th)	The Commitments	Clive Winter, Eddy Joseph, Andy Nelson, Tom Perry and Steve Pederson
**1991** (45th)	Dances with Wolves	Jeffrey Perkins, Bill W. Benton, Gregory H. Watkins and Russell Williams II
**1991** (45th)	The Silence of the Lambs	Skip Lievsay, Christopher Newman and Tom Fleischman
**1992** (46th)	**JFK**	**Tod A. Maitland, Wylie Stateman, Michael D. Wilhoit, Michael Minkler and Gregg Landaker**
**1992** (46th)	The Last of the Mohicans	Simon Kaye, Lon Bender, Larry Kemp, Paul Massey, Doug Hemphill, Mark Smith and Chris Jenkins
**1992** (46th)	Strictly Ballroom	Antony Gray, Ben Osmo, Roger Savage, Ian McLoughlin and Phil Judd
**1992** (46th)	Unforgiven	Alan Robert Murray, Walter Newman, Rob Young, Les Fresholtz, Vern Poore and Dick Alexander
**1993** (47th)	**The Fugitive**	**John Leveque, Bruce Stambler, Becky Sullivan, Scott D. Smith, Donald O. Mitchell, Michael Herbick and Frank A. Montaño**
**1993** (47th)	Jurassic Park	Gary Rydstrom, Ron Judkins, Richard Hymns, Gary Summers and Shawn Murphy
**1993** (47th)	The Piano	Lee Smith, Tony Johnson and Gethin Creagh
**1993** (47th)	Schindler's List	Charles L. Campbell, Louis Edemann, Robert Jackson, Ron Judkins, Andy Nelson, Steve Pederson and Scott Millan
**1994** (48th)	**Speed**	**Stephen Hunter Flick, Gregg Landaker, Steve Maslow, Bob Beemer and David MacMillan**
**1994** (48th)	Backbeat	Glenn Freemantle, Chris Munro and Robin O'Donoghue
**1994** (48th)	The Lion King	Terry Porter, Mel Metcalfe, David J. Hudson and Doc Kane
**1994** (48th)	Pulp Fiction	Stephen Hunter Flick, Ken King, Rick Ash and Dean A. Zupancic
**1995** (49th)	**Braveheart**	**Lon Bender, Per Hallberg, Brian Simmons, Andy Nelson, Scott Millan and Anna Behlmer**
**1995** (49th)	Apollo 13	David MacMillan, Rick Dior, Scott Millan and Steve Pederson
**1995** (49th)	GoldenEye	Jim Shields, David John, Graham V. Hartstone, John Hayward and Michael A. Carter
**1995** (49th)	The Madness of King George	Christopher Ackland, David Crozier and Robin O'Donoghue
**1996** (50th)	**Shine**	**Jim Greenhorn, Toivo Lember, Livia Ruzic, Roger Savage and Gareth Vanderhope**
**1996** (50th)	The English Patient	Mark Berger, Pat Jackson, Walter Murch, Christopher Newman, David Parker and Ivan Sharrock
**1996** (50th)	Evita	Anna Behlmer, Eddy Joseph, Andy Nelson, Ken Weston and Nigel Wright
**1996** (50th)	Independence Day	Bob Beemer, Bill W. Benton, Chris Carpenter, Sandy Gendler, Val Kuklowsky and Jeff Wexler
**1997** (51st)	**L.A. Confidential**	**Terry Rodman, Roland N. Thai, Kirk Francis, Andy Nelson, Anna Behlmer and John Leveque**
**1997** (51st)	The Full Monty	Alistair Crocker, Adrian Rhodes and Ian Wilson
**1997** (51st)	Romeo + Juliet	Gareth Vanderhope, Rob Young and Roger Savage
**1997** (51st)	Titanic	Gary Rydstrom, Tom Johnson, Gary Summers and Mark Ulano
**1998** (52nd)	**Saving Private Ryan**	**Gary Rydstrom, Ron Judkins, Gary Summers, Andy Nelson and Richard Hymns**
**1998** (52nd)	Hilary and Jackie	Nigel Heath, Julian Slater, David Crozier, Ray Merrin and Graham Daniel
**1998** (52nd)	Little Voice	Peter Lindsay, Rodney Glenn, Ray Merrin and Graham Daniel
**1998** (52nd)	Shakespeare in Love	Peter Glossop, John Downer, Robin O'Donoghue and Dominic Lester
**1999** (53rd)	**The Matrix**	**David Lee, John T. Reitz, Gregg Rudloff, David E. Campbell and Dane A. Davis**
**1999** (53rd)	American Beauty	Scott Martin Gershin, Scott Millan, Bob Beemer and Richard Van Dyke
**1999** (53rd)	Buena Vista Social Club	Martin Müller and Jerry Boys
**1999** (53rd)	Star Wars: Episode I – The Phantom Menace	Ben Burtt, Tom Bellfort, John Midgley, Gary Rydstrom, Tom Johnson and Shawn Murphy

=== 2000s ===
Year	Film	Recipient(s)
**2000** (54th)	**Almost Famous**	**Jeff Wexler, Doug Hemphill, Rick Kline, Paul Massey and Michael D. Wilhoit**
**2000** (54th)	Billy Elliot	Mark Holding, Mike Prestwood Smith and Zane Hayward
**2000** (54th)	Crouching Tiger, Hidden Dragon	Drew Kunin, Reilly Steele, Eugene Gearty and Robert Fernandez
**2000** (54th)	Gladiator	Ken Weston, Scott Millan, Bob Beemer and Per Hallberg
**2000** (54th)	The Perfect Storm	Keith A. Wester, John T. Reitz, Gregg Rudloff, David E. Campbell, Wylie Stateman and Kelly Cabral
**2001** (55th)	**Moulin Rouge!**	**Andy Nelson, Anna Behlmer, Roger Savage, Guntis Sics, Gareth Vanderhope and Antony Gray**
**2001** (55th)	Black Hawk Down	Chris Munro, Per Hallberg, Michael Minkler, Myron Nettinga and Karen Baker Landers
**2001** (55th)	Harry Potter and the Philosopher's Stone	John Midgley, Eddy Joseph, Ray Merrin, Graham Daniel and Adam Daniel
**2001** (55th)	The Lord of the Rings: The Fellowship of the Ring	David Farmer, Hammond Peek, Christopher Boyes, Gethin Creagh, Michael Semanick, Ethan Van der Ryn and Mike Hopkins
**2001** (55th)	Shrek	Andy Nelson, Anna Behlmer, Wylie Stateman and Lon Bender
**2002** (56th)	**Chicago**	**Michael Minkler, Dominick Tavella, David Lee and Maurice Schell**
**2002** (56th)	Gangs of New York	Tom Fleischman, Ivan Sharrock, Eugene Gearty and Philip Stockton
**2002** (56th)	Harry Potter and the Chamber of Secrets	Randy Thom, Dennis Leonard, John Midgley, Ray Merrin, Graham Daniel and Rick Kline
**2002** (56th)	The Lord of the Rings: The Two Towers	Ethan Van der Ryn, David Farmer, Mike Hopkins, Hammond Peek, Christopher Boyes, Michael Semanick and Michael Hedges
**2002** (56th)	The Pianist	Jean-Marie Blondel, Dean Humphreys and Gérard Hardy
**2003** (57th)	**Master and Commander: The Far Side of the World**	**Richard King, Doug Hemphill, Paul Massey and Art Rochester**
**2003** (57th)	Cold Mountain	Eddy Joseph, Ivan Sharrock, Walter Murch, Mike Prestwood Smith and Matthew Gough
**2003** (57th)	Kill Bill: Volume 1	Michael Minkler, Myron Nettinga, Wylie Stateman and Mark Ulano
**2003** (57th)	The Lord of the Rings: The Return of the King	Ethan Van der Ryn, Mike Hopkins, David Farmer, Christopher Boyes, Michael Hedges, Michael Semanick and Hammond Peek
**2003** (57th)	Pirates of the Caribbean: The Curse of the Black Pearl	Christopher Boyes, George Watters II, Lee Orloff, David Parker and David E. Campbell
**2004** (58th)	**Ray**	**Karen Baker Landers, Per Hallberg, Steve Cantamessa, Scott Millan, Greg Orloff and Bob Beemer**
**2004** (58th)	The Aviator	Philip Stockton, Eugene Gearty, Petur Hliddal and Tom Fleischman
**2004** (58th)	Collateral	Elliott Koretz, Lee Orloff, Michael Minkler and Myron Nettinga
**2004** (58th)	House of Flying Daggers	Jing Tao and Roger Savage
**2004** (58th)	Spider-Man 2	Paul N. J. Ottosson, Kevin O'Connell, Greg P. Russell and Jeffrey J. Haboush
**2005** (59th)	**Walk the Line**	**Paul Massey, Doug Hemphill, Peter Kurland and Donald Sylvester**
**2005** (59th)	Batman Begins	David Evans, Stefan Henrix and Peter Lindsay
**2005** (59th)	The Constant Gardener	Joakim Sundström, Stuart Wilson, Mike Prestwood Smith and Sven Taits
**2005** (59th)	Crash	Richard Van Dyke, Sandy Gendler, Adam Jenkins and Marc Fishman
**2005** (59th)	King Kong	Hammond Peek, Christopher Boyes, Mike Hopkins and Ethan Van der Ryn
**2006** (60th)	**Casino Royale**	**Chris Munro, Eddy Joseph, Mike Prestwood Smith, Martin Cantwell and Mark Taylor**
**2006** (60th)	Babel	José Antonio Garcia, Jon Taylor, Christian P. Minkler and Martin Hernández
**2006** (60th)	Pan's Labyrinth	Martin Hernández, Jaime Baksht and Miguel Ángel Polo
**2006** (60th)	Pirates of the Caribbean: Dead Man's Chest	Christopher Boyes, George Watters II, Paul Massey and Lee Orloff
**2006** (60th)	United 93	Chris Munro, Mike Prestwood Smith, Doug Cooper, Oliver Tarney and Eddy Joseph
**2007** (61st)	**The Bourne Ultimatum**	**Kirk Francis, Scott Millan, David Parker, Karen Baker Landers and Per Hallberg**
**2007** (61st)	Atonement	Danny Hambrook, Paul Hamblin, Catherine Hodgson and Becki Ponting
**2007** (61st)	La Vie en Rose	Laurent Zeilig, Pascal Villard, Jean-Paul Hurier and Marc Doisne
**2007** (61st)	No Country for Old Men	Peter Kurland, Skip Lievsay, Craig Berkey and Greg Orloff
**2007** (61st)	There Will Be Blood	Christopher Scarabosio, Matthew Wood, John Pritchett, Michael Semanick and Tom Johnson
**2008** (62nd)	**Slumdog Millionaire**	**Glenn Freemantle, Resul Pookutty, Richard Pryke, Tom Sayers and Ian Tapp**
**2008** (62nd)	Changeling	Walt Martin, Alan Robert Murray, John T. Reitz and Gregg Rudloff
**2008** (62nd)	The Dark Knight	Lora Hirschberg, Richard King, Ed Novick and Gary A. Rizzo
**2008** (62nd)	Quantum of Solace	Jimmy Boyle, Eddy Joseph, Chris Munro, Mike Prestwood Smith and Mark Taylor
**2008** (62nd)	WALL-E	Ben Burtt, Tom Myers, Michael Semanick and Matthew Wood
**2009** (63rd)	**The Hurt Locker**	**Ray Beckett and Paul N. J. Ottosson**
**2009** (63rd)	Avatar	Christopher Boyes, Gary Summers, Andy Nelson, Tony Johnson and Addison Teague
**2009** (63rd)	District 9	Brent Burge, Chris Ward, Dave Whitehead, Michael Hedges and Ken Saville
**2009** (63rd)	Star Trek	Peter J. Devlin, Andy Nelson, Anna Behlmer, Mark P. Stoeckinger and Ben Burtt
**2009** (63rd)	Up	Tom Myers, Michael Silvers and Michael Semanick

=== 2010s ===
Year	Film	Recipient(s)
**2010** (64th)	**Inception**	**Richard King, Lora Hirschberg, Gary A. Rizzo and Ed Novick**
**2010** (64th)	127 Hours	Glenn Freemantle, Ian Tapp, Richard Pryke, Steven C. Laneri and Douglas Cameron
**2010** (64th)	Black Swan	Ken Ishii, Craig Henighan and Dominick Tavella
**2010** (64th)	The King's Speech	John Midgley, Lee Walpole and Paul Hamblin
**2010** (64th)	True Grit	Skip Lievsay, Craig Berkey, Greg Orloff, Peter Kurland and Douglas Axtell
**2011** (65th)	**Hugo**	**Philip Stockton, Eugene Gearty, Tom Fleischman and John Midgley**
**2011** (65th)	The Artist	Nadine Muse, Gérard Lamps and Michael Krikorian
**2011** (65th)	Harry Potter and the Deathly Hallows – Part 2	James Mather, Stuart Wilson, Stuart Hilliker, Mike Dowson and Adam Scrivener
**2011** (65th)	Tinker Tailor Soldier Spy	John Casali, Howard Bargroff, Doug Cooper, Stephen Griffiths and Andy Shelley
**2011** (65th)	War Horse	Stuart Wilson, Gary Rydstrom, Andy Nelson, Tom Johnson and Richard Hymns
**2012** (66th)	**Les Misérables**	**Simon Hayes, Andy Nelson, Mark Paterson, Jonathan Allen, Lee Walpole and John Warhurst**
**2012** (66th)	Django Unchained	Mark Ulano, Michael Minkler, Tony Lamberti and Wylie Stateman
**2012** (66th)	The Hobbit: An Unexpected Journey	Tony Johnson, Christopher Boyes, Michael Hedges, Michael Semanick, Brent Burge and Chris Ward
**2012** (66th)	Life of Pi	Drew Kunin, Eugene Gearty, Philip Stockton, Ron Bartlett and Doug Hemphill
**2012** (66th)	Skyfall	Stuart Wilson, Scott Millan, Greg P. Russell, Per Hallberg and Karen Baker Landers
**2013** (67th)	**Gravity**	**Glenn Freemantle, Skip Lievsay, Christopher Benstead, Niv Adiri and Chris Munro**
**2013** (67th)	All Is Lost	Richard Hymns, Steve Boeddeker, Brandon Proctor, Micah Bloomberg and Gillian Arthur
**2013** (67th)	Captain Phillips	Chris Burdon, Mark Taylor, Mike Prestwood Smith, Chris Munro and Oliver Tarney
**2013** (67th)	Inside Llewyn Davis	Peter Kurland, Skip Lievsay, Greg Orloff and Paul Urmson
**2013** (67th)	Rush	Danny Hambrook, Martin Steyer, Stefan Korte, Markus Stemler and Frank Kruse
**2014** (68th)	**Whiplash**	**Thomas Curley, Ben Wilkins and Craig Mann**
**2014** (68th)	American Sniper	Walt Martin (posthumous), John T. Reitz, Gregg Rudloff, Alan Robert Murray and Bub Asman
**2014** (68th)	Birdman or (The Unexpected Virtue of Ignorance)	Thomas Varga, Martin Hernández, Aaron Glascock, Jon Taylor and Frank A. Montaño
**2014** (68th)	The Grand Budapest Hotel	Wayne Lemmer, Christopher Scarabosio and Pawel Wdowczak
**2014** (68th)	The Imitation Game	John Midgley, Lee Walpole, Stuart Hilliker, Martin Jensen and Andy Kennedy
**2015** (69th)	**The Revenant**	**Lon Bender, Chris Duesterdiek, Martin Hernández, Frank A. Montaño, Jon Taylor and Randy Thom**
**2015** (69th)	Bridge of Spies	Drew Kunin, Richard Hymns, Andy Nelson and Gary Rydstrom
**2015** (69th)	Mad Max: Fury Road	Scott Hecker, Chris Jenkins, Mark Mangini, Ben Osmo, Gregg Rudloff and David White
**2015** (69th)	The Martian	Paul Massey, Mac Ruth, Oliver Tarney and Mark Taylor
**2015** (69th)	Star Wars: The Force Awakens	David Acord, Andy Nelson, Christopher Scarabosio, Matthew Wood and Stuart Wilson
**2016** (70th)	**Arrival**	**Claude La Haye, Bernard Gariépy Strobl and Sylvain Bellemare**
**2016** (70th)	Deepwater Horizon	Mike Prestwood Smith, Dror Mohar, Wylie Stateman and David Wyman
**2016** (70th)	Fantastic Beasts and Where to Find Them	Niv Adiri, Glenn Freemantle, Simon Hayes, Andy Nelson and Ian Tapp
**2016** (70th)	Hacksaw Ridge	Peter Grace, Robert Mackenzie, Kevin O'Connell and Andy Wright
**2016** (70th)	La La Land	Mildred Iatrou Morgan, Ai-Ling Lee, Steven A. Morrow and Andy Nelson
**2017** (71st)	**Dunkirk**	**Alex Gibson, Richard King, Gregg Landaker, Gary A. Rizzo and Mark Weingarten**
**2017** (71st)	Baby Driver	Tim Cavagin, Mary H. Ellis, Dan Morgan, Jeremy Price and Julian Slater
**2017** (71st)	Blade Runner 2049	Ron Bartlett, Theo Green, Doug Hemphill, Mark Mangini and Mac Ruth
**2017** (71st)	The Shape of Water	Christian Cooke, Nelson Ferreira, Glen Gauthier, Nathan Robitaille and Brad Zoern
**2017** (71st)	Star Wars: The Last Jedi	Ren Klyce, David Parker, Michael Semanick, Stuart Wilson and Matthew Wood
**2018** (72nd)	**Bohemian Rhapsody**	**John Casali, Tim Cavagin, Nina Hartstone, Paul Massey and John Warhurst**
**2018** (72nd)	First Man	Mary H. Ellis, Mildred Iatrou Morgan, Ai-Ling Lee, Frank A. Montaño and Jon Taylor
**2018** (72nd)	Mission: Impossible – Fallout	Gilbert Lake, James H. Mather, Chris Munro and Mike Prestwood Smith
**2018** (72nd)	A Quiet Place	Erik Aadahl, Michael Barosky, Brandon Proctor and Ethan Van der Ryn
**2018** (72nd)	A Star Is Born	Steven A. Morrow, Alan Robert Murray, Jason Ruder, Tom Ozanich and Dean A. Zupancic
**2019** (73rd)	**1917**	**Scott Millan, Oliver Tarney, Rachael Tate, Mark Taylor and Stuart Wilson**
**2019** (73rd)	Ford v Ferrari	David Giammarco, Paul Massey, Steven A. Morrow and Donald Sylvester
**2019** (73rd)	Joker	Tod A. Maitland, Alan Robert Murray, Tom Ozanich and Dean A. Zupancic
**2019** (73rd)	Rocketman	Matthew Collinge, John Hayes, Danny Sheehan and Mike Prestwood Smith
**2019** (73rd)	Star Wars: The Rise of Skywalker	David Acord, Andy Nelson, Christopher Scarabosio, Stuart Wilson and Matthew Wood

=== 2020s ===
Year	Film	Recipient(s)
**2020** (74th)	**Sound of Metal**	**Jaime Baksht, Nicolas Becker, Phillip Bladh, Carlos Cortés and Michelle Couttolenc**
**2020** (74th)	Greyhound	Beau Borders, Christian P. Minkler, Michael Minkler, Warren Shaw and David Wyman
**2020** (74th)	News of the World	Michael Fentum, William Miller, John Pritchett, Mike Prestwood Smith and Oliver Tarney
**2020** (74th)	Nomadland	Sergio Díaz, Zach Seivers and M. Wolf Snyder
**2020** (74th)	Soul	Coya Elliott, Ren Klyce and David Parker
**2021** (75th)	**Dune**	**Ron Bartlett, Theo Green, Doug Hemphill, Mark Mangini and Mac Ruth**
**2021** (75th)	Last Night in Soho	Tim Cavagin, Dan Morgan, Colin Nicolson and Julian Slater
**2021** (75th)	No Time to Die	James Harrison, Simon Hayes, Paul Massey, Oliver Tarney and Mark Taylor
**2021** (75th)	A Quiet Place Part II	Erik Aadahl, Michael Barosky, Brandon Proctor and Ethan Van der Ryn
**2021** (75th)	West Side Story	Gary Rydstrom, Tod A. Maitland, Andy Nelson and Brian Chumney
**2022** (76th)	**All Quiet on the Western Front**	**Lars Ginzel, Frank Kruse, Viktor Prášil and Markus Stemler**
**2022** (76th)	Avatar: The Way of Water	Christopher Boyes, Michael Hedges, Julian Howarth, Gary Summers and Gwendolyn Yates Whittle
**2022** (76th)	Elvis	Michael Keller, David Lee, Andy Nelson and Wayne Pashley
**2022** (76th)	Tár	Deb Adair, Stephen Griffiths, Andy Shelley, Steve Single and Roland Winke
**2022** (76th)	Top Gun: Maverick	Chris Burdon, James H. Mather, Al Nelson, Mark Taylor and Mark Weingarten
**2023** (77th)	**The Zone of Interest**	**Johnnie Burn and Tarn Willers**
**2023** (77th)	Ferrari	Angelo Bonanni, Tony Lamberti, Andy Nelson, Lee Orloff and Bernard Weiser
**2023** (77th)	Maestro	Richard King, Steven A. Morrow, Tom Ozanich, Jason Ruder and Dean Zupancic
**2023** (77th)	Mission: Impossible – Dead Reckoning Part One	Chris Burdon, James H. Mather, Chris Munro and Mark Taylor
**2023** (77th)	Oppenheimer	Willie D. Burton, Richard King, Kevin O'Connell and Gary A. Rizzo
**2024** (78th)	**Dune: Part Two**	**Ron Bartlett, Doug Hemphill, Gareth John and Richard King**
**2024** (78th)	Blitz	John Casali, Paul Cotterell and James Harrison
**2024** (78th)	Gladiator II	Stéphane Bucher, Matthew Collinge, Paul Massey and Danny Sheehan
**2024** (78th)	The Substance	Valérie Deloof, Victor Fleurant, Victor Praud, Stéphane Thiébaut and Emmanuelle Villard
**2024** (78th)	Wicked	Robin Baynton, Simon Hayes, John Marquis, Andy Nelson and Nancy Nugent Title
**2025** (79th)	**F1**	**Gareth John, Al Nelson, Gwendolyn Yates Whittle, Gary A. Rizzo and Juan Peralta**
**2025** (79th)	Frankenstein	Greg Chapman, Nathan Robitaille, Nelson Ferreira, Christian Cooke and Brad Zoern
**2025** (79th)	One Battle After Another	José Antonio García, Christopher Scarabosio and Tony Villaflor
**2025** (79th)	Sinners	Chris Welcker, Benjamin A. Burtt, Brandon Proctor, Steve Boeddeker and Felipe Pacheco
**2025** (79th)	Warfare	Mitch Lowe, Ben Barker, Howard Bargroff and Richard Spooner

== See also ==
- Academy Award for Best Sound
- Academy Award for Best Sound Editing
- Cinema Audio Society Award for Outstanding Achievement in Sound Mixing for a Motion Picture – Live Action
- Critics' Choice Movie Award for Best Sound
- Golden Reel Award for Outstanding Achievement in Sound Editing – Dialogue and ADR for Feature Film
- Golden Reel Award for Outstanding Achievement in Sound Editing – Sound Effects and Foley for Feature Film

== Notes ==
A^{1} : According to the BAFTAs database, Terry Rawlings received a single joint nomination for two different films.
