= 31st British Academy Film Awards =

1978 film awards ceremony

- Date: 16 March 1978
- Site: Wembley Conference Centre
- Hosted by: Andrew Gardner; Susannah York

Highlights
- Best Film: Annie Hall
- Best Actor: Peter Finch; Network
- Best Actress: Diane Keaton; Annie Hall
- Most awards: Annie Hall (5)
- Most nominations: Network (9)

The 31st British Academy Film Awards, more commonly known as the BAFTAs, took place on 16 March 1978 at the Wembley Conference Centre in London, honouring the best national and foreign films of 1977. Presented by the British Academy of Film and Television Arts, accolades were handed out for the best feature-length film and documentaries of any nationality that were screened at British cinemas in 1977.

Woody Allen's Annie Hall won the award for Best Film, Best Direction and Best Screenplay. Peter Finch and Diane Keaton took home Best Actor and Actress, whilst Edward Fox and Jenny Agutter won in the supporting categories.

The ceremony was hosted by Andrew Gardner and Susannah York.

== Winners and nominees ==
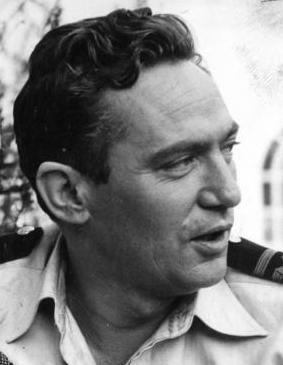
Peter Finch, Best Actor winner

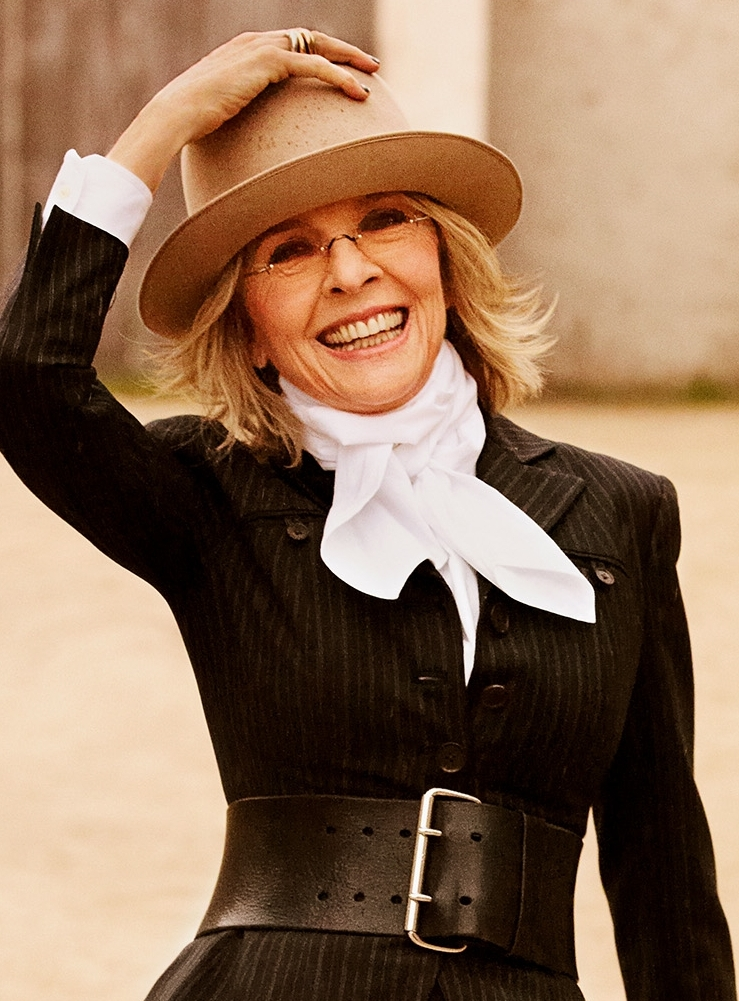
Diane Keaton, Best Actress winner

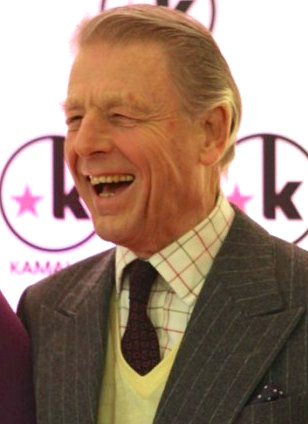
Edward Fox, Best Supporting Actor winner

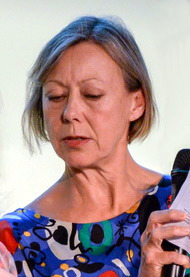
Jenny Agutter, Best Supporting Actress winner

=== BAFTA Fellowship ===
- **Fred Zinnemann**

=== Awards ===
Winners are listed first and highlighted in boldface.

**Best Film**: **Annie Hall – Woody Allen**; A Bridge Too Far – Richard Attenborough; Network – Sidney Lumet; Rocky – John G. Avildsen	**Best Direction**: **Woody Allen – Annie Hall**; John G. Avildsen – Rocky; Richard Attenborough – A Bridge Too Far; Sidney Lumet – Network
**Best Actor in a Leading Role**: **Peter Finch – Network as Howard Beale**; Sylvester Stallone – Rocky as Rocky Balboa; William Holden – Network as Max Schumacher; Woody Allen – Annie Hall as Alvy Singer	**Best Actress in a Leading Role**: **Diane Keaton – Annie Hall as Annie Hall**; Faye Dunaway – Network as Diana Christensen; Lily Tomlin – The Late Show as Margo Sperling; Shelley Duvall – 3 Women as Mildred Lammoreaux
**Best Actor in a Supporting Role**: **Edward Fox – A Bridge Too Far as Brian Horrocks**; Colin Blakely – Equus as Frank Strang; Robert Duvall – Network as Frank Hackett; Zero Mostel – The Front as Hecky Brown	**Best Actress in a Supporting Role**: **Jenny Agutter – Equus as Jill Mason**; Geraldine Chaplin – Welcome to L.A. as Karen Hood; Joan Plowright – Equus as Dora Strang; Shelley Winters – Next Stop, Greenwich Village as Fay Lapinsky
**Best Screenplay**: **Annie Hall – Woody Allen and Marshall Brickman**; Equus – Peter Shaffer; Network – Paddy Chayefsky; Rocky – Sylvester Stallone	**Best Cinematography**: **A Bridge Too Far – Geoffrey Unsworth**; The Deep – Christopher Challis; Fellini's Casanova – Giuseppe Rotunno; Valentino – Peter Suschitzky
**Best Costume Design**: **Fellini's Casanova – Danilo Donati**; Joseph Andrews – Michael Annals and Patrick Wheatley; New York, New York – Theadora Van Runkle; Valentino – Shirley Ann Russell	**Best Editing**: **Annie Hall – Ralph Rosenblum and Wendy Greene Bricmont**; A Bridge Too Far – Antony Gibbs; Network – Alan Heim; Rocky – Richard Halsey
**Best Original Music**: **A Bridge Too Far – John Addison**; Equus – Richard Rodney Bennett; The Spy Who Loved Me – Marvin Hamlisch; A Star Is Born – Paul Williams, Barbra Streisand, Kenneth Ascher, Rupert Holmes, Leon Russell, Kenny Loggins, Alan Bergman, Marilyn Bergman and Donna Weiss	**Best Production Design**: **Fellini's Casanova – Danilo Donati**; A Bridge Too Far – Terence Marsh; The Spy Who Loved Me – Ken Adam; Valentino – Philip Harrison
**Best Sound**: **A Bridge Too Far – Peter Horrocks, Gerry Humphreys, Simon Kaye, Robin O'Donoghue and Les Wiggins**; Network – Jack Fitzstephens, Marc Lamb, Sandford Rackow, James Sabat and Dick Vorisek; New York, New York – Kay Rose, Michael Colgan, James Fritch, Larry Jost and Richard Portman; A Star Is Born – Robert Glass, Robert Knudson, Marvin Kosberg, Tom Overton, Joseph Von Stroheim and Dan Wallin	**Best Specialised Film**: **Path of the Paddle – Bill Mason**; Hazchem – Roy Pace; How the Motor Works: Part II – George Seager
**Best Fictional Film**: **Bead Game – Ishu Patel**; The Chinese Word for Horse – Kate Canning; The Sand Castle – Co Hoedeman	**Best Factual Film**: **The Living City – Peter De Normanville and Sarah Erulkar**; Pipeline Alaska – John Armstrong; Reflections – Paddy Carey; The Shetland Experience – Derek Williams
**Most Promising Newcomer to Leading Film Roles**: **Isabelle Huppert – The Lacemaker as Pomme**; Jeannette Clift George – The Hiding Place as Corrie Ten Boom; Olimpia Carlisi – The Middle of the World as Adriana; Saverio Marconi – Padre Padrone as Gavino

== Statistics ==
Films that received multiple nominations
Nominations	Film
9	Network
8	A Bridge Too Far
6	Annie Hall
5	Equus
5	Rocky
3	Fellini's Casanova
3	Valentino
2	New York, New York
2	The Spy Who Loved Me
2	A Star Is Born

Films that received multiple awards
Awards	Film
5	Annie Hall
4	A Bridge Too Far
2	Fellini's Casanova

== See also ==
- 50th Academy Awards
- 3rd César Awards
- 30th Directors Guild of America Awards
- 35th Golden Globe Awards
- 4th Saturn Awards
- 30th Writers Guild of America Awards
