= Les Wiggins =

British-American sound editor

- Born: 2 August 1931
- Died: 12 April 2018 (aged 86)
- Occupation: Sound editor
- Years active: 1953–1999

Les Wiggins (2 August 1931 – 12 April 2018) was a British-American sound editor. He won four British Academy Film Awards and was nominated four more in the category Best Sound.

== Selected filmography ==
- Fiddler on the Roof (1971; co-nominated with David Hildyard and Gordon McCallum)
- Jesus Christ Superstar (1973; co-won with Gordon McCallum and Keith Grant)
- Rollerball (1975; co-nominated with Archie Ludski, Derek Ball and Gordon McCallum)
- Bugsy Malone (1976; co-won with Clive Winter and Ken Barker)
- A Bridge Too Far (1977; co-won with Peter Horrocks, Gerry Humphreys, Simon Kaye and Robin O'Donoghue)
- Fame (1980; co-won with Chris Newman and Michael J. Kohut)
- Greystoke: The Legend of Tarzan, Lord of the Apes (1984, co-nominated with Ivan Sharrock, Gordon McCallum and Roy Baker)
- The Last Emperor (1988; co-nominated with Ivan Sharrock and Bill Rowe)
