= 28th British Academy Film Awards =

1975 film awards ceremony

- Date: 26 February 1975
- Hosted by: David Niven

Highlights
- Best Film: Lacombe, Lucien
- Best Actor: Jack Nicholson; Chinatown and The Last Detail
- Best Actress: Joanne Woodward; Summer Wishes, Winter Dreams
- Most awards: Chinatown, The Great Gatsby and Murder on the Orient Express (3)
- Most nominations: Chinatown (11)

The 28th British Academy Film Awards, more commonly known as the BAFTAs, took place on 26 February 1975, honouring the best national and foreign films of 1974. Presented by the British Academy of Film and Television Arts, accolades were handed out for the best feature-length film and documentaries of any nationality that were screened at British cinemas in 1974.

Louis Malle's Lacombe, Lucien won the award for Best Film. Jack Nicholson accepted the award for Best Actor for his performances in Chinatown and The Last Detail from the set of One Flew Over the Cuckoo's Nest. Joanne Woodward (Summer Wishes, Winter Dreams) received Best Actress, whilst John Gielgud and Ingrid Bergman won in the supporting categories for their performances in Murder on the Orient Express.

The ceremony was hosted by David Niven.

== Winners and nominees ==
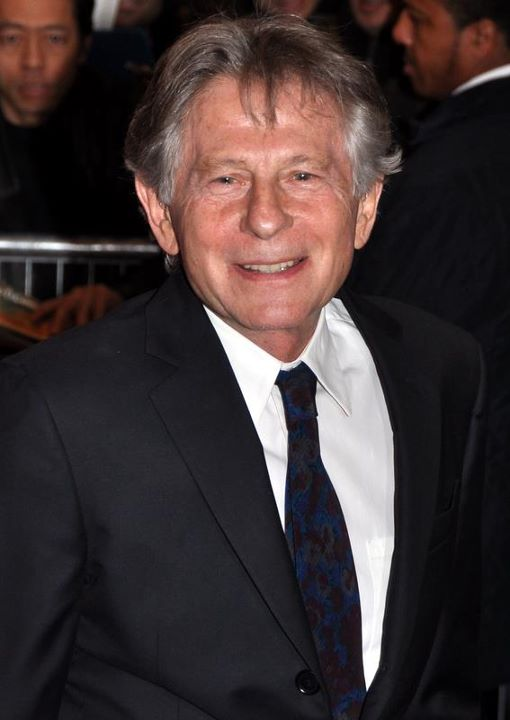
Roman Polanski, Best Direction winner

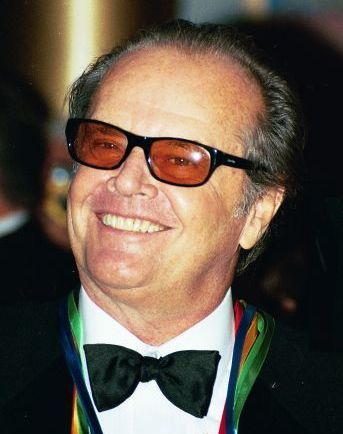
Jack Nicholson, Best Actor winner

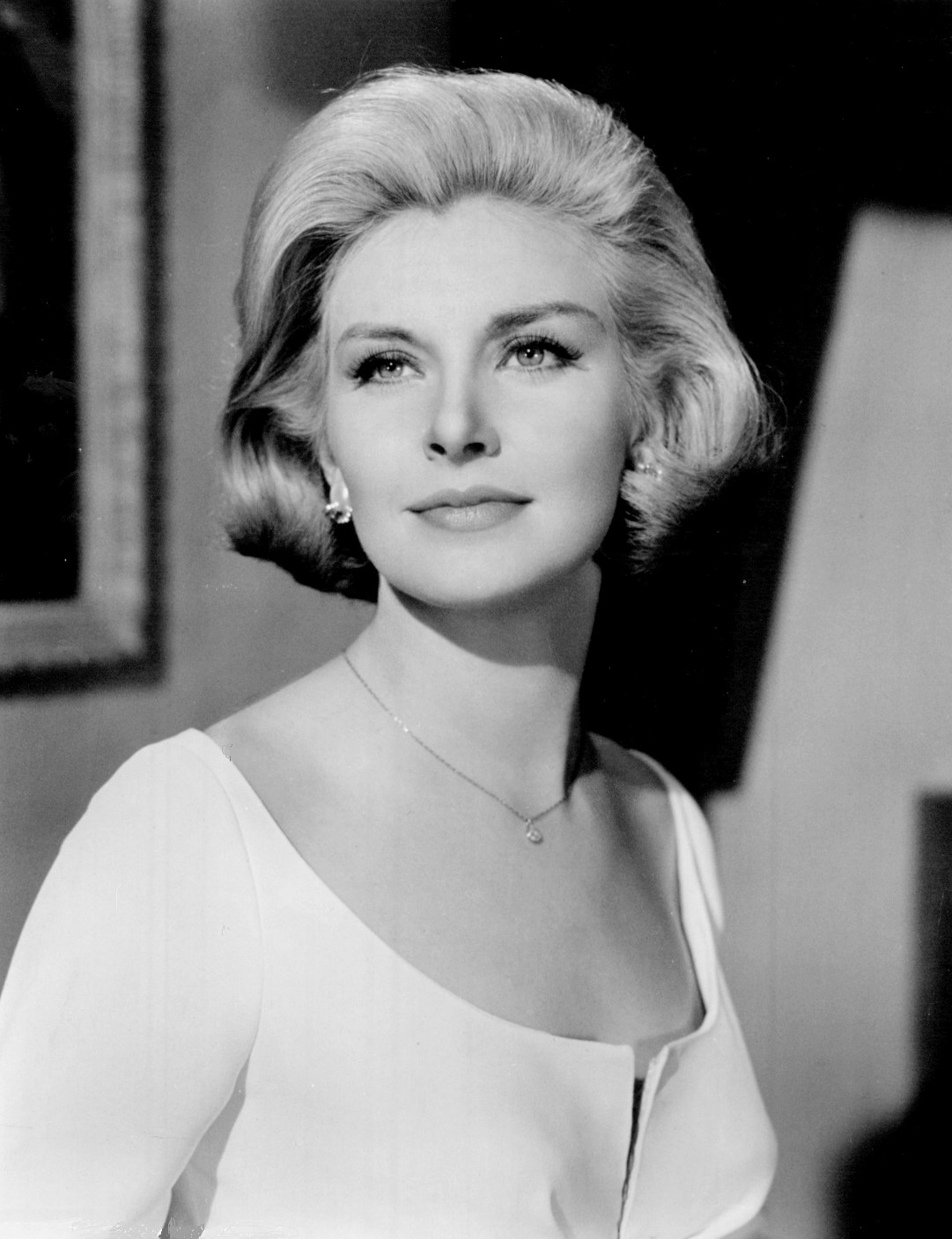
Joanne Woodward, Best Actress winner

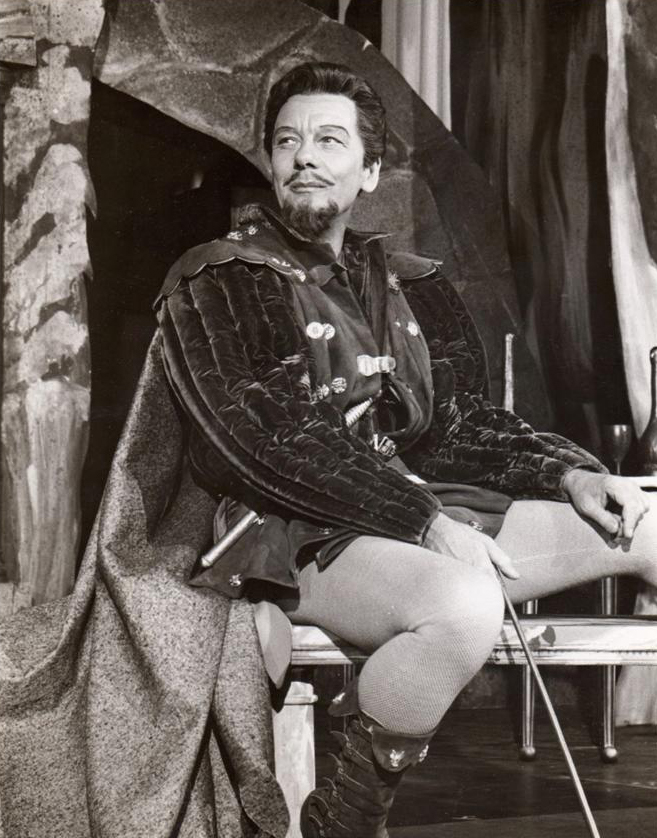
John Gielgud, Best Supporting Actor winner

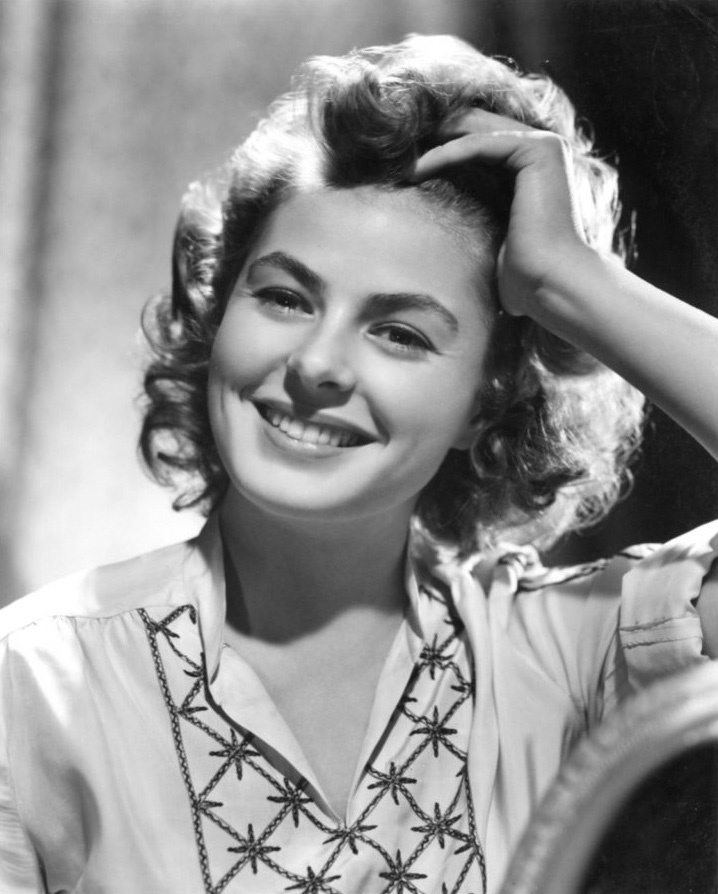
Ingrid Bergman, Best Supporting Actress winner

=== BAFTA Fellowship ===
- **Jacques Cousteau**

=== Awards ===
Winners are listed first and highlighted in boldface.

**Best Film**: **Lacombe, Lucien – Louis Malle**; Chinatown – Roman Polanski; The Last Detail – Hal Ashby; Murder on the Orient Express – Sidney Lumet	**Best Direction**: **Roman Polanski – Chinatown**; Francis Ford Coppola – The Conversation; Louis Malle – Lacombe, Lucien; Sidney Lumet – Serpico, Murder on the Orient Express
**Best Actor in a Leading Role**: **Jack Nicholson – Chinatown as J.J. "Jake" Gittes**; **Jack Nicholson – The Last Detail as Signalman 1st Class Billy "Badass" Buddusky**; Albert Finney – Murder on the Orient Express as Hercule Poirot; Al Pacino – Serpico as Frank Serpico; Gene Hackman – The Conversation as Harry Caul	**Best Actress in a Leading Role**: **Joanne Woodward – Summer Wishes, Winter Dreams as Rita Walden**; Barbra Streisand – The Way We Were as Katie Morosky; Cicely Tyson – The Autobiography of Miss Jane Pittman as Jane Pittman; Faye Dunaway – Chinatown as Evelyn Cross Mulwray
**Best Actor in a Supporting Role**: **John Gielgud – Murder on the Orient Express as Edward Beddoes**; Adam Faith – Stardust as Mike Menary; John Huston – Chinatown as Noah Cross; Randy Quaid – The Last Detail as Seaman Larry Meadows	**Best Actress in a Supporting Role**: **Ingrid Bergman – Murder on the Orient Express as Greta Ohlsson**; Cindy Williams – American Graffiti as Laurie Henderson; Sylvia Sidney – Summer Wishes, Winter Dreams as Mrs. Pritchett; Sylvia Syms – The Tamarind Seed as Margaret Stephenson
**Best Screenplay**: **Chinatown – Robert Towne**; **The Last Detail – Robert Towne**; Blazing Saddles – Mel Brooks, Norman Steinberg, Andrew Bergman, Richard Pryor and Alan Uger; The Conversation – Francis Ford Coppola; Lacombe, Lucien – Louis Malle and Patrick Modiano	**Best Cinematography**: **The Great Gatsby – Douglas Slocombe**; Chinatown – John A. Alonzo; Murder on the Orient Express – Geoffrey Unsworth; The Three Musketeers – David Watkin; Zardoz – Geoffrey Unsworth
**Best Costume Design**: **The Great Gatsby – Theoni V. Aldredge**; Chinatown – Anthea Sylbert; Murder on the Orient Express – Tony Walton; The Three Musketeers – Yvonne Blake	**Best Editing**: **The Conversation – Walter Murch and Richard Chew**; Chinatown – Sam O'Steen; Murder on the Orient Express – Anne V. Coates; The Three Musketeers – John Victor Smith
**Best Original Music**: **Murder on the Orient Express – Richard Rodney Bennett**; Chinatown – Jerry Goldsmith; Happy New Year – Francis Lai; Serpico – Mikis Theodorakis; The Three Musketeers – Michel Legrand	**Best Production Design**: **The Great Gatsby – John Box**; Chinatown – Richard Sylbert; Murder on the Orient Express – Tony Walton; The Three Musketeers – Brian Eatwell
**Best Sound**: **The Conversation – Art Rochester, Nat Boxer, Mike Ejve and Walter Murch**; Earthquake – Melvin Metcalfe Sr. and Ronald Pierce; The Exorcist – Chris Newman, Jean-Louis Ducarme, Robert Knudson, Frederick Brown, Bob Fine, Ross Taylor, Ron Nagle, Doc Siegel, Gonzalo Gavira and Hal Landaker; Gold – Alan Somes, Rydal Love, Michael Crouch, John W. Mitchell and Gordon McCallum	**Best Short Animation**: **Hunger (La Faim)**; Cat's Cradle
**Best Documentary**: **Cree Hunters of Mistassini**; Companero: Victor Jara of Chile; Leprosy	**Best Specialised Film**: **Monet in London**; Adventure in Colour; Child Part II; Nobody's Fault
**John Grierson Award**: **Location North Sea**; Acting in Turn; Facets of Glass; The Quiet Land	**United Nations Award**: **Lacombe, Lucien – Louis Malle**; The Autobiography of Miss Jane Pittman – John Korty
**Most Promising Newcomer to Leading Film Roles**: **Georgina Hale – Mahler as Alma Mahler**; Cleavon Little – Blazing Saddles as Sheriff Bart; Sissy Spacek – Badlands as Holly Sargis

== Statistics ==
Films that received multiple nominations
Nominations	Film
11	Chinatown
10	Murder on the Orient Express
5	The Conversation
5	The Three Musketeers
4	Lacombe, Lucien
4	The Last Detail
3	The Great Gatsby
3	Serpico
2	The Autobiography of Miss Jane Pittman
2	Blazing Saddles
2	Summer Wishes, Winter Dreams

Films that received multiple awards
Awards	Film
3	Chinatown
3	The Great Gatsby
3	Murder on the Orient Express
2	The Conversation
2	Lacombe, Lucien
2	The Last Detail

== See also ==
- 47th Academy Awards
- 27th Directors Guild of America Awards
- 32nd Golden Globe Awards
- 1st Saturn Awards
- 27th Writers Guild of America Awards
