= 35th British Academy Film Awards =

1982 film awards ceremony

- Date: 18 March 1982
- Site: Hippodrome, London
- Hosted by: Denis Norden

Highlights
- Best Film: Chariots of Fire
- Best Actor: Burt Lancaster; Atlantic City
- Best Actress: Meryl Streep; The French Lieutenant's Woman
- Most awards: Chariots of Fire and The French Lieutenant's Woman (3)
- Most nominations: Chariots of Fire and The French Lieutenant's Woman (11)

The 35th British Academy Film Awards, more commonly known as the BAFTAs, took place on 18 March 1982 at the Hippodrome, London, honouring the best national and foreign films of 1981. Presented by the British Academy of Film and Television Arts, accolades were handed out for the best feature-length film and documentaries of any nationality that were screened at British cinemas in 1981.

There are no records, and no explanation, showing any nominations nor winner for the BAFTA Award for Best Actress in a Supporting Role at this 35th film ceremony.

The ceremony was hosted by Denis Norden.

== Winners and nominees ==
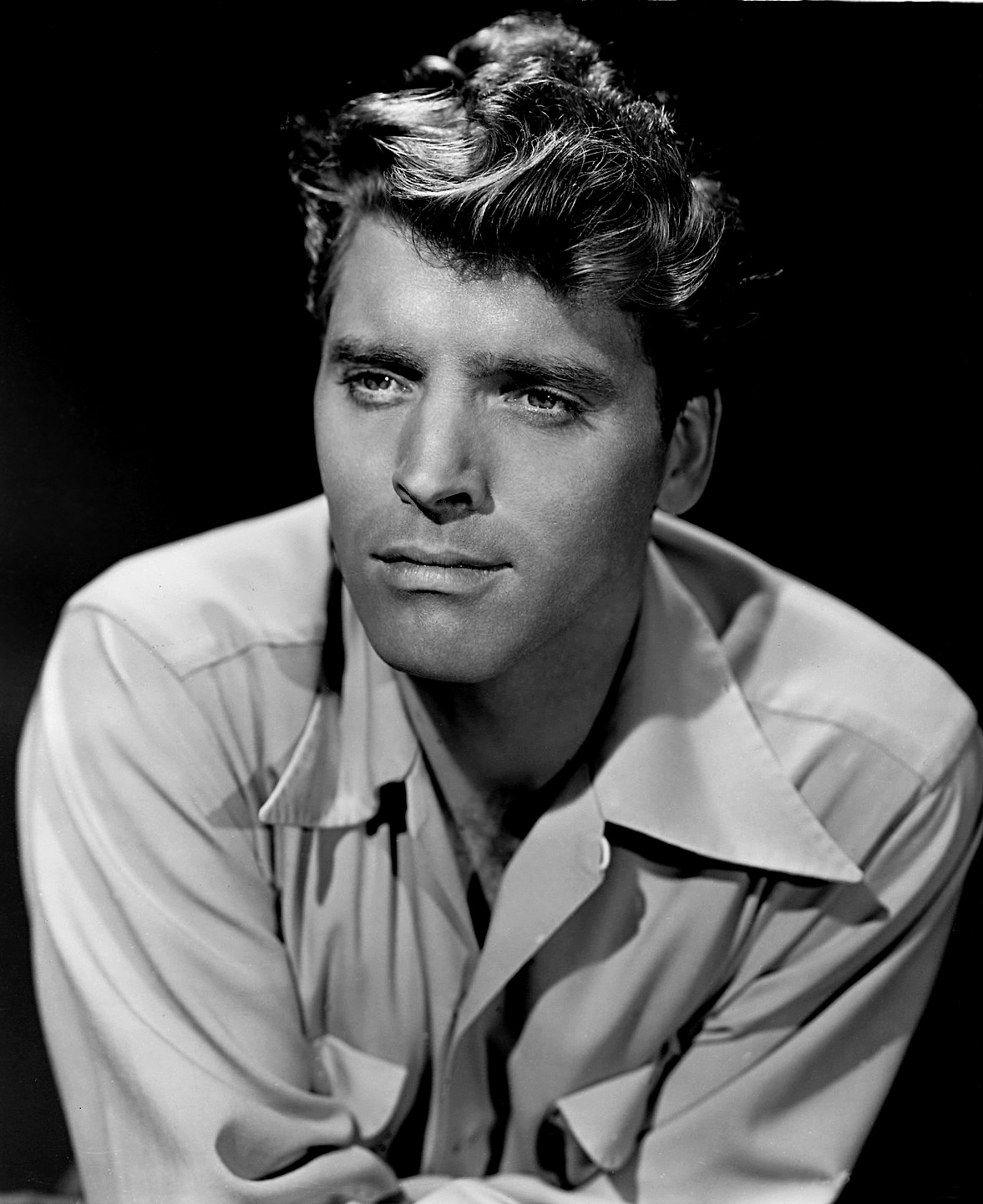
Burt Lancaster, Best Actor winner

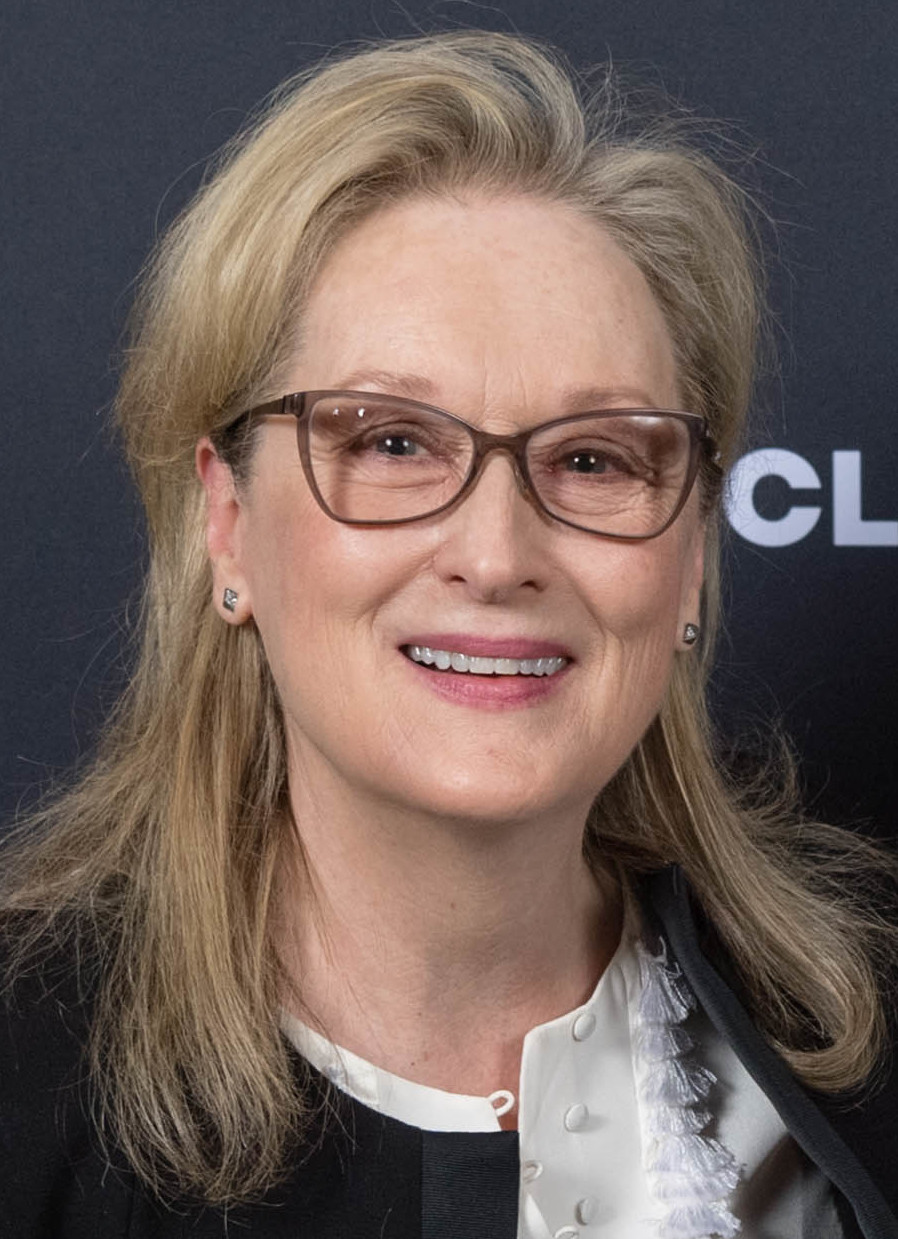
Meryl Streep, Best Actress winner

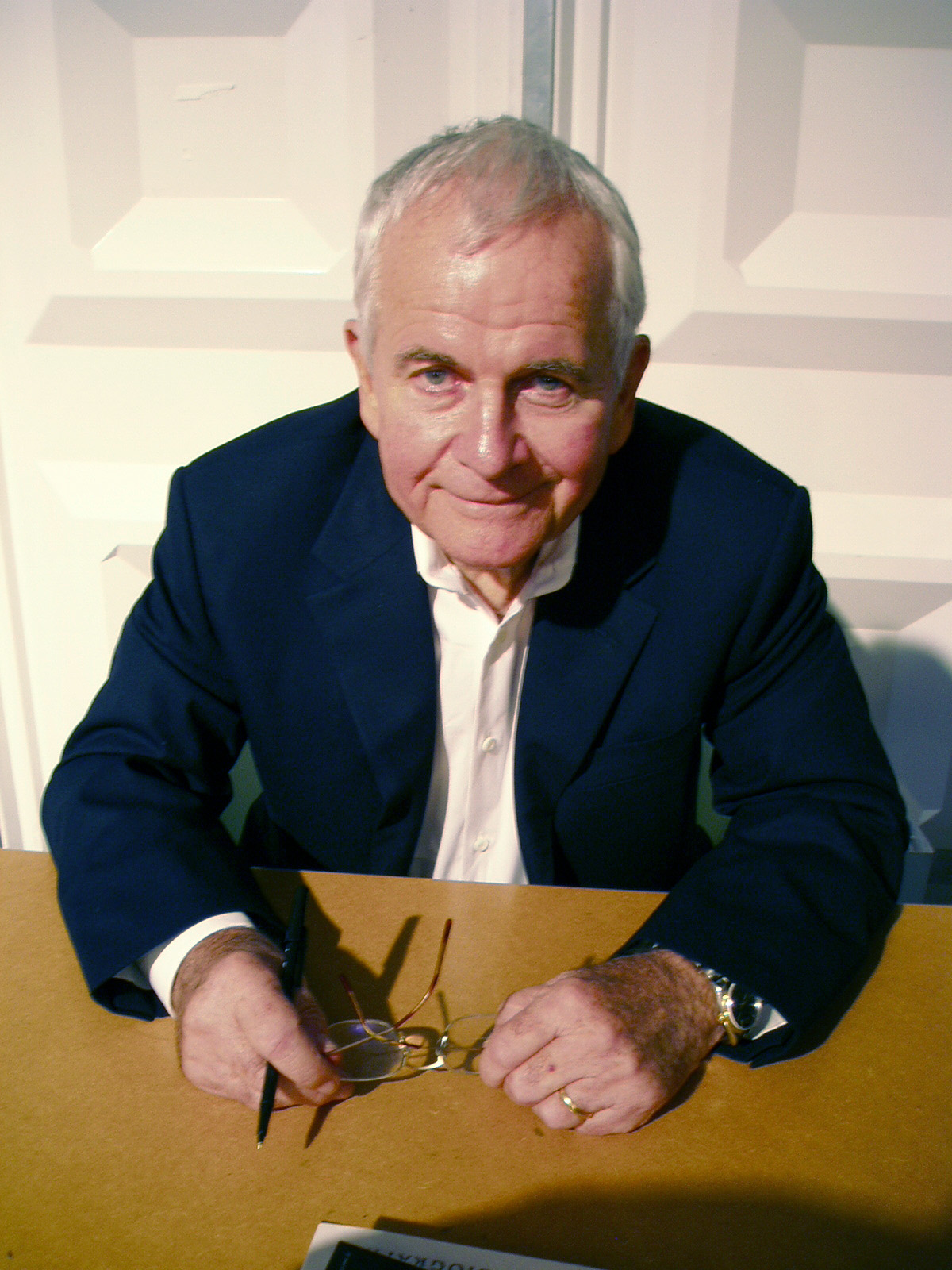
Ian Holm, Best Supporting Artist winner

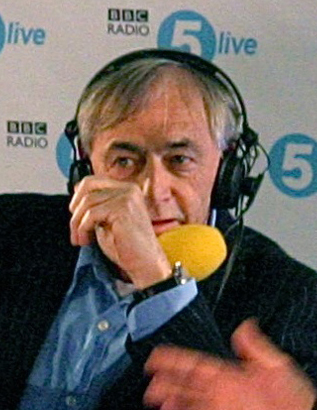
Bill Forsyth, Best Screenplay winner

=== BAFTA Fellowship ===
- **Andrzej Wajda**

=== Outstanding British Contribution to Cinema ===
- **David Puttnam**

=== Awards ===
Winners are listed first and highlighted in boldface.

**Best Film**: **Chariots of Fire – David Puttnam**; Atlantic City – Denis Héroux; The French Lieutenant's Woman – Leon Clore; Gregory's Girl – Davina Belling and Clive Parsons; Raiders of the Lost Ark – Frank Marshall	**Best Direction**: **Louis Malle – Atlantic City**; Bill Forsyth – Gregory's Girl; Hugh Hudson – Chariots of Fire; Karel Reisz – The French Lieutenant's Woman
**Best Actor in a Leading Role**: **Burt Lancaster – Atlantic City as Lou Pascal**; Bob Hoskins – The Long Good Friday as Harold Shand; Jeremy Irons – The French Lieutenant's Woman as Charles Henry Smithson; Robert De Niro – Raging Bull as Jake LaMotta	**Best Actress in a Leading Role**: **Meryl Streep – The French Lieutenant's Woman as Sarah Woodruff / Anna**; Maggie Smith – Quartet as Lois Heidler; Mary Tyler Moore – Ordinary People as Beth Jarrett; Sissy Spacek – Coal Miner's Daughter as Loretta Lynn
**Best Supporting Artist**: **Ian Holm – Chariots of Fire as Sam Mussabini**; Denholm Elliott – Raiders of the Lost Ark as Marcus Brody; John Gielgud – Arthur as Hobson; Nigel Havers – Chariots of Fire as Lord Andrew Lindsay	**Best Screenplay**: **Gregory's Girl – Bill Forsyth**; Atlantic City – John Guare; Chariots of Fire – Colin Welland; The French Lieutenant's Woman – Harold Pinter
**Best Cinematography**: **Tess – Geoffrey Unsworth and Ghislain Cloquet**; Chariots of Fire – David Watkin; The French Lieutenant's Woman – Freddie Francis; Raiders of the Lost Ark – Douglas Slocombe	**Best Costume Design**: **Chariots of Fire – Milena Canonero**; Excalibur – Bob Ringwood; The French Lieutenant's Woman – Tom Rand; Tess – Anthony Powell
**Best Editing**: **Raging Bull – Thelma Schoonmaker**; Chariots of Fire – Terry Rawlings; The French Lieutenant's Woman – John Bloom; Raiders of the Lost Ark – Michael Kahn	**Best Original Music**: **The French Lieutenant's Woman – Carl Davis**; Arthur – Burt Bacharach; Chariots of Fire – Vangelis; Raiders of the Lost Ark – John Williams
**Best Production Design**: **Raiders of the Lost Ark – Norman Reynolds**; Chariots of Fire – Roger Hall; The French Lieutenant's Woman – Assheton Gorton; Tess – Pierre Guffroy	**Best Sound**: **The French Lieutenant's Woman – Don Sharpe, Ivan Sharrock and Bill Rowe**; Chariots of Fire – Clive Winter, Bill Rowe and Jim Shields; Coal Miner's Daughter – Gordon Ecker, James R. Alexander, Richard Portman and Roger Heman Jr; Raiders of the Lost Ark – Roy Charman, Ben Burtt and Bill Varney
**Best Short Animation**: **The Sweater – Sheldon Cohen**; Beginnings – Clorinda Warny; Creole – Sam Weiss	**Best Short Film**: **Recluse – Bob Bentley**; Couples and Robbers – Clare Peploe; Towers of Babel – Jonathan Lewis
**Best Documentary**: **Soldier Girls – Nick Broomfield and Joan Churchill**; Best Boy – Ira Wohl; The Life and Times of Rosie the Riveter – Connie Field; Return Journey – Ian Potts	**Most Promising Newcomer to Leading Film Roles**: **Joe Pesci – Raging Bull as Joey LaMotta**; Cathy Moriarty – Raging Bull as Vikki LaMotta; Klaus Maria Brandauer – Mephisto as Hendrik Hoefgen; Timothy Hutton – Ordinary People as Conrad Jarrett

== Statistics ==
Films that received multiple nominations
Nominations	Film
11	Chariots of Fire
11	The French Lieutenant's Woman
7	Raiders of the Lost Ark
4	Atlantic City
4	Raging Bull
3	Gregory's Girl
3	Tess
2	Arthur
2	Coal Miner's Daughter
2	Ordinary People

Films that received multiple awards
Awards	Film
3	Chariots of Fire
3	The French Lieutenant's Woman
2	Atlantic City
2	Raging Bull

== See also ==
- 54th Academy Awards
- 7th César Awards
- 34th Directors Guild of America Awards
- 39th Golden Globe Awards
- 2nd Golden Raspberry Awards
- 8th Saturn Awards
- 34th Writers Guild of America Awards
