= 25th British Academy Film Awards =

1972 film awards ceremony

- Date: 1972

Highlights
- Best Film: Sunday Bloody Sunday
- Best Actor: Peter Finch; Sunday Bloody Sunday
- Best Actress: Glenda Jackson; Sunday Bloody Sunday
- Most awards: Sunday Bloody Sunday (5)
- Most nominations: The Go-Between (12)

The 25th British Academy Film Awards, given by the British Academy of Film and Television Arts in 1972, honoured the best films of 1971. Sunday Bloody Sunday won Best Actor, Best Actress, Best Director, Best Film and Best Editor. The Go-Between won Best Supporting Actor, Best Supporting Actress and Best Screenplay, plus Most Promising Newcomer for Dominic Guard.

== Winners and nominees ==
BAFTA Fellowship: Freddie Young

Best Film Sunday Bloody Sunday – John Schlesinger: Death in Venice – Luchino Visconti; The Go-Between – Joseph Losey; Taking Off – Miloš Forman	Best Direction John Schlesinger – Sunday Bloody Sunday: Joseph Losey – The Go-Between; Luchino Visconti – Death in Venice; Miloš Forman – Taking Off
Best Actor in a Leading Role Peter Finch – Sunday Bloody Sunday as Daniel Hirsh: Albert Finney – Gumshoe as Eddie Ginley; Dirk Bogarde – Death in Venice as Gustav Von Aschenbach; Dustin Hoffman – Little Big Man as Jack Crabb	Best Actress in a Leading Role Glenda Jackson – Sunday Bloody Sunday as Alex Greville: Jane Fonda – Klute as Bree Daniels; Julie Christie – The Go-Between as Marian Maudsley; Lynn Carlin – Taking Off as Lynn Tyne; Nanette Newman – The Raging Moon as Jill Matthews
Best Actor in a Supporting Role Edward Fox – The Go-Between as Hugh: Ian Hendry – Get Carter as Eric Paice; John Hurt – 10 Rillington Place as Timothy Evans; Michael Gough – The Go-Between as Mr. Maudsley	Best Actress in a Supporting Role Margaret Leighton – The Go-Between as Mrs. Maudsley: Georgia Brown – The Raging Moon as Sarah Charles; Georgia Engel – Taking Off as Margot; Jane Asher – Deep End as Susan
Best Screenplay The Go-Between – Harold Pinter: Gumshoe – Neville Smith; Sunday Bloody Sunday – Penelope Gilliatt; Taking Off – Miloš Forman, John Guare, Jean-Claude Carrière and John Klein	Best Cinematography Death in Venice – Pasqualino De Santis: Fiddler on the Roof – Oswald Morris; The Go-Between – Gerry Fisher; Sunday Bloody Sunday – Billy Williams
Best Costume Design Death in Venice – Piero Tosi: The Go-Between – John Furniss; Nicholas and Alexandra – Yvonne Blake and Antonio Castillo; The Tales of Beatrix Potter – Christine Edzard	Best Editing Sunday Bloody Sunday – Richard Marden: Fiddler on the Roof – Antony Gibbs and Robert Lawrence; Performance – Antony Gibbs; Taking Off – John Carter
Best Original Music Summer of '42 – Michel Legrand: Little Big Man – John P. Hammond; Shaft – Isaac Hayes; Trafic – Charles Dumont	Best Production Design Death in Venice – Ferdinando Scarfiotti: The Go-Between – Carmen Dillon; Nicholas and Alexandra – John Box; The Tales of Beatrix Potter – Christine Edzard
Best Sound Death in Venice – Vittorio Trentino and Giuseppe Muratori: Fiddler on the Roof – Les Wiggins, David Hildyard and Gordon McCallum; The Go-Between – Garth Craven, Peter Handford and Hugh Strain; Sunday Bloody Sunday – David Campling, Simon Kaye and Gerry Humphreys	Best Documentary The Hellstrom Chronicle – Walon Green: Death of a Legend – Bill Mason
Best Short Film Alaska: The Great Land – Derek Williams: Big Horn – Bill Schmalz; The Long Memory – John Philips	Best Specialised Film The Savage Voyage – Eric Marquis: Don't Go Down The... – Leonard Lewis; A Future for the Past – Peter Bradford
Most Promising Newcomer to Leading Film Roles Dominic Guard – The Go-Between as Leo Colston: Carrie Snodgress – Diary of a Mad Housewife as Bettina Balser; Gary Grimes – Summer of '42 as Herman Raucher; Janet Suzman – Nicholas and Alexandra as Alexandra Feodorovna	United Nations Award The Battle of Algiers – Gillo Pontecorvo: Joe Hill – Bo Widerberg; The Landlord – Hal Ashby; Little Big Man – Arthur Penn

== Statistics ==
Films that received multiple nominations
Nominations	Film
12	The Go-Between
8	Sunday Bloody Sunday
7	Death in Venice
6	Taking Off
3	Fiddler on the Roof
3	Little Big Man
3	Nicholas and Alexandra
2	Gumshoe
2	The Raging Moon
2	Summer of '42
2	The Tales of Beatrix Potter

Films that received multiple awards
Awards	Film
5	Sunday Bloody Sunday
4	Death in Venice
4	The Go-Between

== See also ==
- 44th Academy Awards
- 24th Directors Guild of America Awards
- 29th Golden Globe Awards
- 24th Writers Guild of America Awards
