= Chris McLaughlin (sound engineer) =

American sound engineer

- Occupation: Sound engineer
- Years active: 1974–1997

Chris McLaughlin is an American sound engineer. He won a British Academy Film Award and was nominated for another one in the category Best Sound for the films Nashville and The Rose.

== Selected filmography ==
- Nashville (1975; co-won with William A. Sawyer, Jim Webb and Richard Portman)
- The Rose (1979; co-nominated with Jim Webb, Kay Rose and Theodore Soderberg)
