= Kay Rose =

American sound editor (1922–2002)

- Born: February 12, 1922; New York City, US
- Died: December 11, 2002 (aged 80); Burbank, California, US
- Occupation: Sound editor
- Years active: 1954–1999
- Spouse: Sherman A. Rose (1951-?) (divorced)
- Children: 1

Kay Rose (February 12, 1922 – December 11, 2002) was an American sound editor. She received a Special Achievement Academy Award during the 57th Academy Awards in 1985. This was in the category of Best Sound Editing for the film The River. She has 68 credits in TV and film from 1954 to 1999.

She was also the first female sound editor to win an Oscar.

At the 34th British Academy Film Awards, she was nominated for a British Academy Film Award in the category Best Sound for the film The Rose. Her nomination was shared with Jim Webb, Chris McLaughlin and Theodore Soderberg.

In 1999 she received the Lifetime Achievement award at the Motion Picture Sound Editors and in 2002 she received the CAS Career Achievement Award at the Cinema Audio Society awards.

== Personal life ==
Kay Rose was married to film editor Sherman A. Rose in 1951, which resulted in a divorce. Together they had a daughter, Victoria Rose Sampson, who is also a sound editor. she died of organ failure in Burbank on December 11, 2002.
