= Bill Phillips (sound editor) =

American sound editor

- Born: September 28, 1934
- Died: December 17, 2014 (aged 80)
- Occupation: Sound editor

Bill Phillips (September 28, 1934 – December 17, 2014) was an American sound editor. He won a British Academy Film Award and was nominated for another one in the category Best Sound for the films Good Morning, Vietnam and Mississippi Burning.

== Selected filmography ==
- Good Morning, Vietnam (1987; co-nominated with Clive Winter and Terry Porter)
- Mississippi Burning (1988; co-won with Danny Michael, Robert J. Litt, Elliot Tyson and Rick Kline)
