= Don Challis =

British sound and dubbing editor

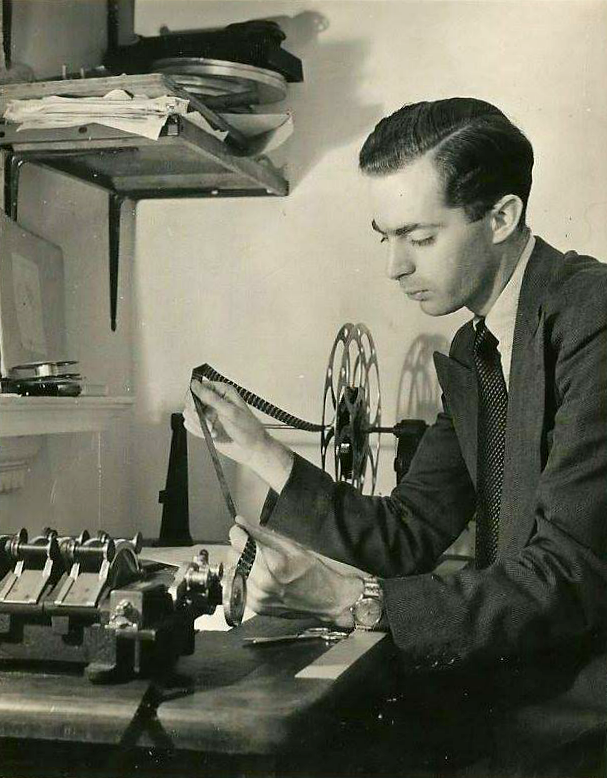
- Born: 26 June 1929; Tottenham, England
- Died: 2017 (aged 87–88)
- Occupations: Sound and dubbing editor

Donald Challis (26 June 1929 – 2017) was a British sound and dubbing editor for many critically acclaimed films, including A Taste of Honey (1961), Help! (1965), and The Three Musketeers (1973). He won a BAFTA Film Award as sound editor alongside Simon Kaye for Best Film Soundtrack in 1970 for Oh! What a Lovely War.

== Biography ==
Don Challis was born in Tottenham, England. His career started at the age of 19 in 1948 at the Pinewood Studios in Buckinghamshire, England, with the Crown Film Unit as an apprentice assistant film editor, the studios having been commandeered by the government for making propaganda films for the Ministry of Information. His Association of Cine Technicians Union membership number was 8708.

He spent some time at Beaconsfield Studios, Merton Park Studios and Countryman Films in Soho Square, London.

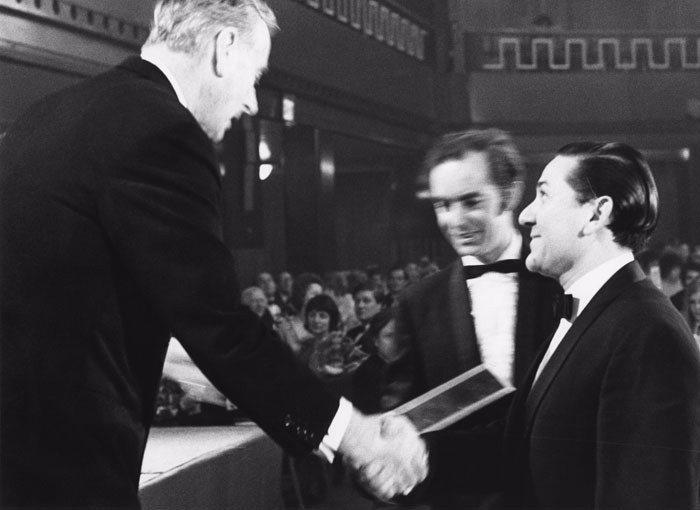
Best Soundtrack BAFTA winners (1970) Don Challis and Simon Kaye

In 1969, he took the role of sound editor for the hit musical film Oh! What a Lovely War which went down as a huge success, winning five BAFTA Film Awards in 1970, one of which going to himself and his partner Simon Kaye (who was the sound mixer for the film) for the Best Soundtrack. This huge success led him to being in the sound editing department for a range of horror and drama films including Tam Lin in 1970, Blue Blood (1973 film) and I Don't Want to Be Born in 1975. More so, the success gave him the opportunity to be the sound editor for the award-winning adaptations of The Three Musketeers (1973 live-action film) and The Four Musketeers in 1974.

In 1971, Challis became the sound editor for the award-winning film adaptation of Fiddler on the Roof. However he fell ill during the production of the film so his role was taken over by Les Wiggins, a sound editor from Middlesex, England. This resulted in Wiggins being credited sound editor, leaving Don Challis uncredited despite his contribution.

Challis' last contribution to the sound department of the film industry was in 1976 with Emily (film). Then, at the end of the same year, he moved from his home in Hertfordshire, England, to Essex with his wife and two daughters. Marking the move as the end of his career in the sound editing department, he settled for the ownership of a small post office.

== Filmography ==
Credited roles

Year	Film title	Role in production
1959	Beat Girl	dubbing editor
1960	A Circle of Deception	sound editor
1960	Sons and Lovers	sound editor
1961	A Taste of Honey	sound editor
1961	During One Night	sound editor
1962	The Loneliness of the Long Distance Runner	sound editor
1963	Girl with Green Eyes	sound editor
1963	Tom Jones	sound editor
1965	Help!	sound editor
1965	The Knack ...and How to Get It	sound editor
1965	I Was Happy Here	sound editor
1966	A Funny Thing Happened on the Way to the Forum	sound editor
1966	The Shuttered Room	sound editor
1967	How I Won the War	dubbing editor
1968	Sebastian	dubbing editor
1968	Petulia	dubbing editor
1969	Connecting Rooms	sound editor
1969	Oh! What a Lovely War	sound editor
1970	Tam Lin	dubbing editor
1971	The Boy Friend	dubbing editor
1972	The Ragman's Daughter	dubbing editor
1972	Nothing But the Night	sound editor
1973	The Three Musketeers	sound editor
1973	Blue Blood	sound editor
1973	The Man Called Noon	sound editor
1974	The Four Musketeers	sound editor
1975	I Don't Want to Be Born	sound editor
1976	Emily	dubbing editor

Uncredited roles

Year	Film title	Role in production
1952	Hindle Wakes	assistant editor
1959	The Rough and the Smooth	assistant editor
1971	Fiddler on the Roof	Sound editor**

[**] role taken over by Les Wiggins (credited)
