= Jonathan Bates =

English sound engineer

- Born: 1 November 1939; Little Chart, Kent, England
- Died: 31 October 2008 (aged 68); Esher, Surrey, England
- Resting place: St Peter's Churchyard, Petersham
- Education: The King's School, Canterbury
- Occupation: Sound Editor
- Years active: 1959–2007
- Notable credit(s): Gandhi; Cry Freedom; A Chorus Line
- Spouse: Jennifer Thompson
- Children: Tim and Catherine
- Father: H. E. Bates
- Relatives: Victoria Wicks
- Awards: BAFTA for Sound on Cry Freedom (1988)

Jonathan Bates (1 November 1939 – 31 October 2008) was an English sound editor. He was nominated for an Academy Award in the category of Best Sound for the film Gandhi, and won a BAFTA in 1988 for his work on the film Cry Freedom alongside long-term collaborators Gerry Humphreys and Simon Kaye.

== Early life ==
Jonathan Bates was born at home on 1 November 1939, the youngest of the four children of author H. E. Bates. He was a pupil at The King's School, Canterbury and had early ambitions to become a jet pilot, but was influenced to work in the movies due to his father's relationship with the director David Lean.

== Career ==
Jonathan Bates began his film career at Ealing Studios, Borehamwood as a runner and trainee soon after leaving school in 1956, and eventually became a Sound editor. He worked on over 65 films between 1959 and 2007, and was most associated with the films of Brian G. Hutton, Jack Gold, Lewis Gilbert and Richard Attenborough with whom he collaborated on numerous productions.

== Personal life ==
In 1966 Bates married Jennifer Thompson whilst shooting Hotel Paradiso in Paris. He had first met her whilst working on the 1961 production of Whistle Down the Wind, where she was and also an assistant dubbing editor. They remained married until his death in 2008. The union produced a son, Tim and a daughter, Catherine. Bates retired in 2003 and was also a passionate cricketer and played for Twickenham All-Stars. He died in 2008 after being diagnosed with a brain tumour.

== Awards ==
| Year | Work | Award | Category | Result | Ref. |
|---|---|---|---|---|---|
| 1983 | Gandhi | 55th Academy Awards (Oscars) | Sound | Nominated | |
| 1983 | Gandhi | 36th British Academy Film Awards (BAFTAs) | Sound | Nominated | |
| 1986 | A Chorus Line | 39th British Academy Film Awards (BAFTAs) | Sound | Nominated | |
| 1988 | Cry Freedom | 41st British Academy Film Awards (BAFTAs) | Sound | Won | |

== Selected filmography ==
| Year | Title | Credit | Director | Ref |
|---|---|---|---|---|
| 1959 | Kidnapped | Dubbing Assistant | Robert Stevenson | |
| 1960 | Never Let Go | Dubbing Assistant | John Guillermin | |
| 1961 | Whistle Down the Wind | Dubbing Assistant | Bryan Forbes | |
| 1963 | Station Six Sahara | Sound Editor | Seth Holt | |
| 1964 | The Moon-spinners | Sound Editor | James Neilson | |
| 1964 | The Three Lives of Thomasina | Sound Editor | Don Chaffey | |
| 1965 | Those Magnificent Men in Their Flying Machines | Dubbing Editor | Ken Annakin | |
| 1966 | Bunny Lake is Missing | Sound Editor | Otto Preminger | |
| 1966 | Return of the Seven | Sound Editor | Burt Kennedy | |
| 1966 | Hotel Paradiso | Sound | Peter Glenville | |
| 1967 | Fathom | Sound Editor | Leslie H. Martinson | |
| 1967 | Maroc 7 | Sound | Gerry O'Hara | |
| 1967 | The Comedians | Sound | Peter Glenville | |
| 1968 | Inspector Clouseau | Sound | Bud Yorkin | |
| 1969 | Where Eagles Dare | Sound Editor | Brian G. Hutton | |
| 1970 | Kelly's Heroes | Sound Editor | Brian G. Hutton | |
| 1971 | 'Friends' | Dubbing Editor | Lewis Gilbert | |
| 1971 | Macbeth | Dubbing Editor | Roman Polanski | |
| 1972 | Danny Jones | Sound Editor | Jules Bricken | |
| 1972 | Young Winston | Dubbing Editor | Richard Attenborough | |
| 1973 | Catholics. A Fable of the Future (TV movie) | Sound Editor | Jack Gold | |
| 1973 | Night Watch | Sound Editor | Brian G. Hutton | |
| 1974 | 11 Harrowhouse | Sound Editor | Aram Avakian | |
| 1975 | The "Human" Factor | Sound Editor | Edward Dmytryk | |
| 1975 | Murder on the Orient Express | Sound Editor | Sidney Lumet | |
| 1975 | 92 in the Shade | Sound Editor | Thomas McGuane | |
| 1976 | Aces High | Sound Editor | Jack Gold | |
| 1977 | Voyage of the Damned | Sound Editor | Stuart Rosenberg | |
| 1977 | The Eagle Has Landed | Sound Editor | John Sturges | |
| 1978 | Silver Bears | Sound Editor | Ivan Passer | |
| 1978 | Magic | Sound Editor | Richard Attenborough | |
| 1978 | International Velvet | Sound Editor | Bryan Forbes | |
| 1978 | The Medusa Touch | Sound Editor | Jack Gold | |
| 1979 | Dracula | Sound Editor | John Badham | |
| 1980 | Flash Gordon | Sound Editor | Mike Hodges | |
| 1982 | Gandhi | Sound Editor | Richard Attenborough | |
| 1983 | Red Monarch | Sound Editor | Jack Gold | |
| 1983 | High Road to China | Sound Editor | Brian G. Hutton | |
| 1984 | The Chain | Sound Editor | Jack Gold | |
| 1985 | A Chorus Line | Supervising Sound Editor | Richard Attenborough | |
| 1986 | Mona Lisa | Sound Editor | Neil Jordan | |
| 1987 | Cry Freedom | Sound Editor | Richard Attenborough | |
| 1988 | A Fish Called Wanda | Sound Editor | Charles Crichton | |
| 1988 | The Deceivers | Supervising Sound Editor | Nicholas Meyer | |
| 1989 | The Mighty Quinn | Sound Editor | Carl Schenkel | |
| 1989 | Shirley Valentine | Sound Editor | Lewis Gilbert | |
| 1992 | Chaplin | Sound Editor | Richard Attenborough | |
| 1993 | Prague | Sound Editor | Ian Sellar | |
| 1993 | The Man Without a Face | Supervising Sound Editor | Mel Gibson | |
| 1994 | Shadowlands | Sound | Richard Attenborough | |
| 1995 | Haunted | Sound Editor | Lewis Gilbert | |
| 1996 | In Love and War | Sound | Richard Attenborough | |
| 1997 | Lawn Dogs | Supervising Sound Editor | John Duigan | |
| 1998 | Dancing at Lughnasa | Supervising Sound Editor | Pat O'Connor | |
| 1998 | Les Misérables | Supervising Sound Editor | Bille August | |
| 1999 | The Trench | Supervising Sound Editor | William Boyd | |
| 2000 | The Body | Supervising Sound Editor | Jonas McCord | |
| 2000 | Grey Owl | Sound | Richard Attenborough | |
| 2002 | Before You Go | Supervising Sound Editor | Lewis Gilbert | |
| 2003 | Nicholas Nickleby | Supervising Sound Editor | Douglas McGrath | |
| 2007 | Closing the Ring | Supervising Sound Editor | Richard Attenborough | |
