= Tim Cavagin =

British sound engineer

- Occupation: Sound engineer

Tim Cavagin is a British sound engineer. He won an Academy Award and was nominated for another one in the category Best Sound for the films Baby Driver and Bohemian Rhapsody.

== Selected filmography ==
- Baby Driver (2017; co-nominated with Julian Slater and Mary H. Ellis)
- Bohemian Rhapsody (2018; co-won with Paul Massey and John Casali)
