= BAFTA Award for Best Screenplay =

British film industry award

- Awarded for: Best Screenplay
- Location: United Kingdom
- Presented by: British Academy of Film and Television Arts
- First award: 1968 (presented 1969)
- Final award: 1982 (presented 1983)
- Website: http://www.bafta.org/

The BAFTA Award for Best Screenplay is a British Academy Film Award for the best script. It was awarded from 1968 to 1982. In 1983 it was split into BAFTA Award for Best Original Screenplay and BAFTA Award for Best Adapted Screenplay.

In the following lists, the titles and names in bold with a gold background are the winners and recipients respectively; those not in bold are the nominees. The years given are those in which the films under consideration were released, not the year of the ceremony, which always takes place the following year.

== Winners and nominees ==
indicates the winner

=== 1960s ===
Year	Film	Screenwriter(s)
**1968** (22nd)	**The Graduate**	**Calder Willingham and Buck Henry**
**1968** (22nd)	if....	David Sherwin
**1968** (22nd)	The Lion in Winter	James Goldman
**1969** (23rd)	**Midnight Cowboy**	**Waldo Salt**
**1969** (23rd)	Goodbye, Columbus	Arnold Schulman
**1969** (23rd)	Women in Love	Larry Kramer
**1969** (23rd)	Z	Costa-Gavras and Jorge Semprún

=== 1970s ===
Year	Film	Screenwriter(s)
**1970** (24th)	**Butch Cassidy and the Sundance Kid**	**William Goldman**
**1970** (24th)	Bob & Carol & Ted & Alice	Paul Mazursky and Larry Tucker
**1970** (24th)	Kes	Barry Hines, Ken Loach and Tony Garnett
**1970** (24th)	They Shoot Horses, Don't They?	James Poe and Robert E. Thompson
**1971** (25th)	**The Go-Between**	**Harold Pinter**
**1971** (25th)	Gumshoe	Neville Smith
**1971** (25th)	Sunday Bloody Sunday	Penelope Gilliatt
**1971** (25th)	Taking Off	Miloš Forman, John Guare, Jean-Claude Carrière and John Klein
**1972** (26th)	**The Hospital** (TIE)	**Paddy Chayefsky**
**1972** (26th)	**The Last Picture Show** (TIE)	**Larry McMurtry and Peter Bogdanovich**
**1972** (26th)	Cabaret	Jay Presson Allen
**1972** (26th)	A Clockwork Orange	Stanley Kubrick
**1973** (27th)	**The Discreet Charm of the Bourgeoisie**	**Luis Buñuel and Jean-Claude Carrière**
**1973** (27th)	The Day of the Jackal	Kenneth Ross
**1973** (27th)	Sleuth	Anthony Shaffer
**1973** (27th)	A Touch of Class	Melvin Frank and Jack Rose
**1974** (28th)	**Chinatown** / **The Last Detail**	**Robert Towne ^{[A]}**
**1974** (28th)	Blazing Saddles	Mel Brooks, Norman Steinberg, Andrew Bergman, Richard Pryor and Alan Uger
**1974** (28th)	The Conversation	Francis Ford Coppola
**1974** (28th)	Lacombe, Lucien	Louis Malle and Patrick Modiano
**1975** (29th)	**Alice Doesn't Live Here Anymore**	**Robert Getchell**
**1975** (29th)	Dog Day Afternoon	Frank Pierson
**1975** (29th)	Jaws	Peter Benchley and Carl Gottlieb
**1975** (29th)	Nashville	Joan Tewkesbury
**1976** (30th)	**Bugsy Malone**	**Alan Parker**
**1976** (30th)	All the President's Men	William Goldman
**1976** (30th)	One Flew Over the Cuckoo's Nest	Bo Goldman and Lawrence Hauben
**1976** (30th)	The Sunshine Boys	Neil Simon
**1977** (31st)	**Annie Hall**	**Woody Allen and Marshall Brickman**
**1977** (31st)	Equus	Peter Shaffer
**1977** (31st)	Network	Paddy Chayefsky
**1977** (31st)	Rocky	Sylvester Stallone
**1978** (32nd)	**Julia**	**Alvin Sargent**
**1978** (32nd)	Close Encounters of the Third Kind	Steven Spielberg
**1978** (32nd)	The Goodbye Girl	Neil Simon
**1978** (32nd)	A Wedding	John Considine, Patricia Resnick, Allan F. Nicholls and Robert Altman
**1979** (33rd)	**Manhattan**	**Woody Allen and Marshall Brickman**
**1979** (33rd)	The China Syndrome	Mike Gray, T. S. Cook and James Bridges
**1979** (33rd)	The Deer Hunter	Deric Washburn
**1979** (33rd)	Yanks	Colin Welland and Walter Bernstein

=== 1980s ===
Year	Film	Screenwriter(s)
**1980** (34th)	**Being There**	**Jerzy Kosiński**
**1980** (34th)	Airplane!	Jim Abrahams, David Zucker and Jerry Zucker
**1980** (34th)	The Elephant Man	Christopher De Vore, Eric Bergren and David Lynch
**1980** (34th)	Kramer vs. Kramer	Robert Benton
**1981** (35th)	**Gregory's Girl**	**Bill Forsyth**
**1981** (35th)	Atlantic City	John Guare
**1981** (35th)	Chariots of Fire	Colin Welland
**1981** (35th)	The French Lieutenant's Woman	Harold Pinter
**1982** (36th)	**Missing**	**Costa-Gavras and Donald E. Stewart**
**1982** (36th)	E.T. the Extra-Terrestrial	Melissa Mathison
**1982** (36th)	Gandhi	John Briley
**1982** (36th)	On Golden Pond	Ernest Thompson

== Multiple wins and nominations ==
=== Multiple wins ===
Wins	Screenwriter
2	Woody Allen
2	Marshall Brickman

=== Multiple nominations ===
Nominations	Screenwriter
2	Woody Allen
2	Marshall Brickman
2	Jean-Claude Carrière
2	Paddy Chayefsky
2	Costa-Gavras
2	William Goldman
2	John Guare
2	Harold Pinter
2	Neil Simon
2	Colin Welland

== Notes ==
A^{1} : According to the BAFTA database, Robert Towne received a single joint award for two different films.
