= Peter Handford =

English sound engineer (1919–2007)

Peter Handford MBE
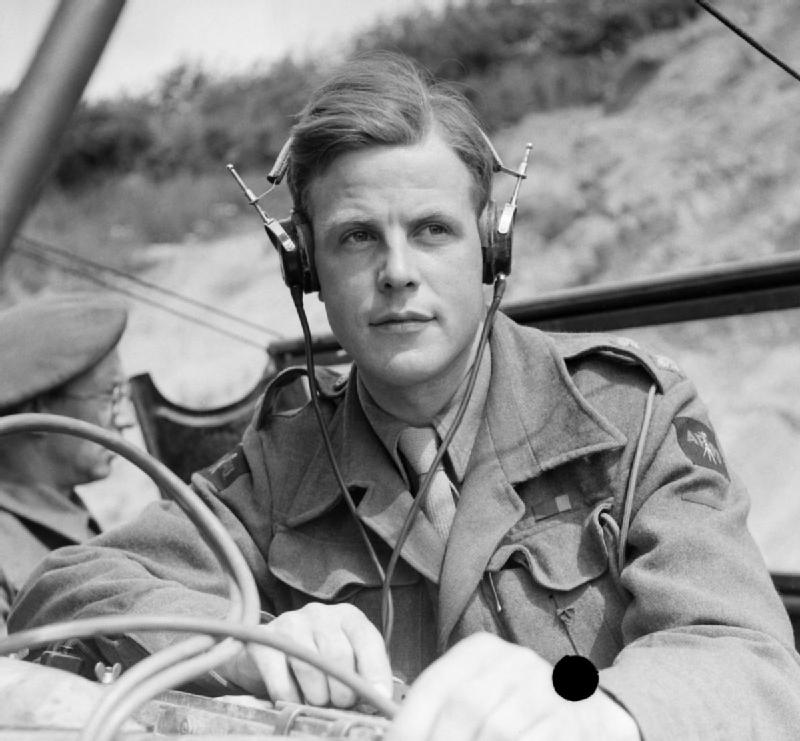
- Handford in 1945, Army Film Unit of the British Expeditionary Force
- Born: 21 March 1919; Four Elms, Kent, England
- Died: 6 November 2007 (aged 88); Wickham Skeith, Suffolk, England
- Known for: Location Sound Recording
- Spouse(s): Freda Austen (1942–?) (divorced) (2 Children); Helen Fraser (1964–2007) (his death)
- Children: Marilyn Handford; Pamela Handford

Peter Handford MBE (21 March 1919 – 6 November 2007) was an English location sound recordist. He is considered a master and pioneer of this area of sound recording.

== Life and work ==
Born into a vicarage family at Four Elms in Kent, England, Handford began work in 1936 with London Films at Denham as a trainee sound recordist. He honed his sound recording skills during the D-Day landings, where he served with the Army Film Unit of the British Expeditionary Force, for which he was mentioned in despatched and awarded the MBE. His first screen credit was on Black Magic (1949) and in the same year he recorded Under Capricorn for Alfred Hitchcock. In 1972, Hitchcock sought him out to work on Frenzy.

Handford pioneered the use of original synchronous sound recording for film director David Lean on Summertime (also known as Summer Madness, 1955) which was shot on location in Venice, and developed the technique during the British New Wave cinema movement, working on films such as Room at the Top (1959), The Entertainer, Saturday Night and Sunday Morning, Sons and Lovers (all 1960), Billy Liar, Tom Jones (both 1963), Oh! What a Lovely War (1969) and on The Go-Between (1971) and other films for Joseph Losey.

He also worked on the 1970s railway-based Murder on the Orient Express (1974) and The Lady Vanishes (1979), on both of which radio microphones were extensively used. Later he went into semi-retirement, working as a freelancer for Anglia Television, but was recalled to the film business by Sydney Pollack for the location sound required on Out of Africa (1985), for which he was awarded the Academy Award for Best Sound Mixing and also a BAFTA. On this film he worked along with Chris Jenkins, Gary Alexander, and Larry Stensvold.

Handford went on to work on Dangerous Liaisons, Gorillas in the Mist (both 1988) and White Hunter Black Heart (1990). His last film was Havana (also 1990). Following his death in 2007, Peter's ashes were scattered at the site of Steele Road railway station on the former Waverley Route. He had spent days and nights at this remote location making some of his most well known steam locomotive recordings.

== Transacord ==
Handford was also known for his recordings of steam locomotives in the 1950s and 1960s, during the last days of steam railways in Britain. These were issued on the Transacord label between 1955 and 1961, at which point a deal was struck with Argo, by then part of Decca, for whom many new recordings were made under the "Argo Transacord" title. In 1980, Argo was phased out by (British) Decca's new owners, PolyGram and Argo's owner, Harley Usill, started a new label, ASV, on which new and reissued Transacord LPs were released in the early to late 1980s. The first CD was released in 1987 with others following in the 1990s. ASV is now part of the Sanctuary Group (itself now owned by Universal) and Transacord recordings remained on catalogue on CD into the late 1990s, with some still readily available until comparatively recently (as at 2011). The majority of the CD tracks were later made available as digital downloads. However, the copyright in Transacord's recordings reverted from Universal to Transacord on 1 September 2011 at which point the digital downloads were made unavailable. Transacord is currently looking at making both CDs and digital downloads available again, possibly via the National Railway Museum, which organisation holds Peter Handford's original tape recordings and other materials from Handford's private collections.

Transacord's records are listed in Jim Palm's Railways on Record book from the early 1980s (though the book does not include information on the many non-British or non-railway recordings released by Transacord). A partial discography is also included in Peter Handford's 1980 autobiography, Sounds of Railways and Their Recording – unfortunately this does not include the records released by Argo during the 1960s on their (Z)DA catalogue sequence and misses some later recordings out as well. However, 2011 saw the publication of Transacord: Sounds of Steam and other Transports of Delight. The book was written with major input from both Transacord and the National Railway Museum and includes a history of the label plus the most comprehensive discography of UK releases ever made available.

== Family ==
His second marriage was to actress Helen Fraser whom he first met on location for Billy Liar. He died 6 November 2007, at Wickham Skeith, Suffolk.

== Awards ==
Year	Work	Award	Category	Result	Ref.
1972	The Go-Between	25th British Academy Film Awards (BAFTAs)	Sound	Nominated	
1986	Out of Africa	58th Academy Awards (Oscars)	Sound	Won	
1987	Out of Africa	40th British Academy Film Awards (BAFTAs)	Sound	Won	
1988	Hope and Glory	41st British Academy Film Awards (BAFTAs)	Sound	Nominated	
1989	Gorillas in the Mist	61st Academy Awards (Oscars)	Sound	Nominated	
