= Jack Hildyard =

British cinematographer (1908–1990)

Jack Hildyard BSC
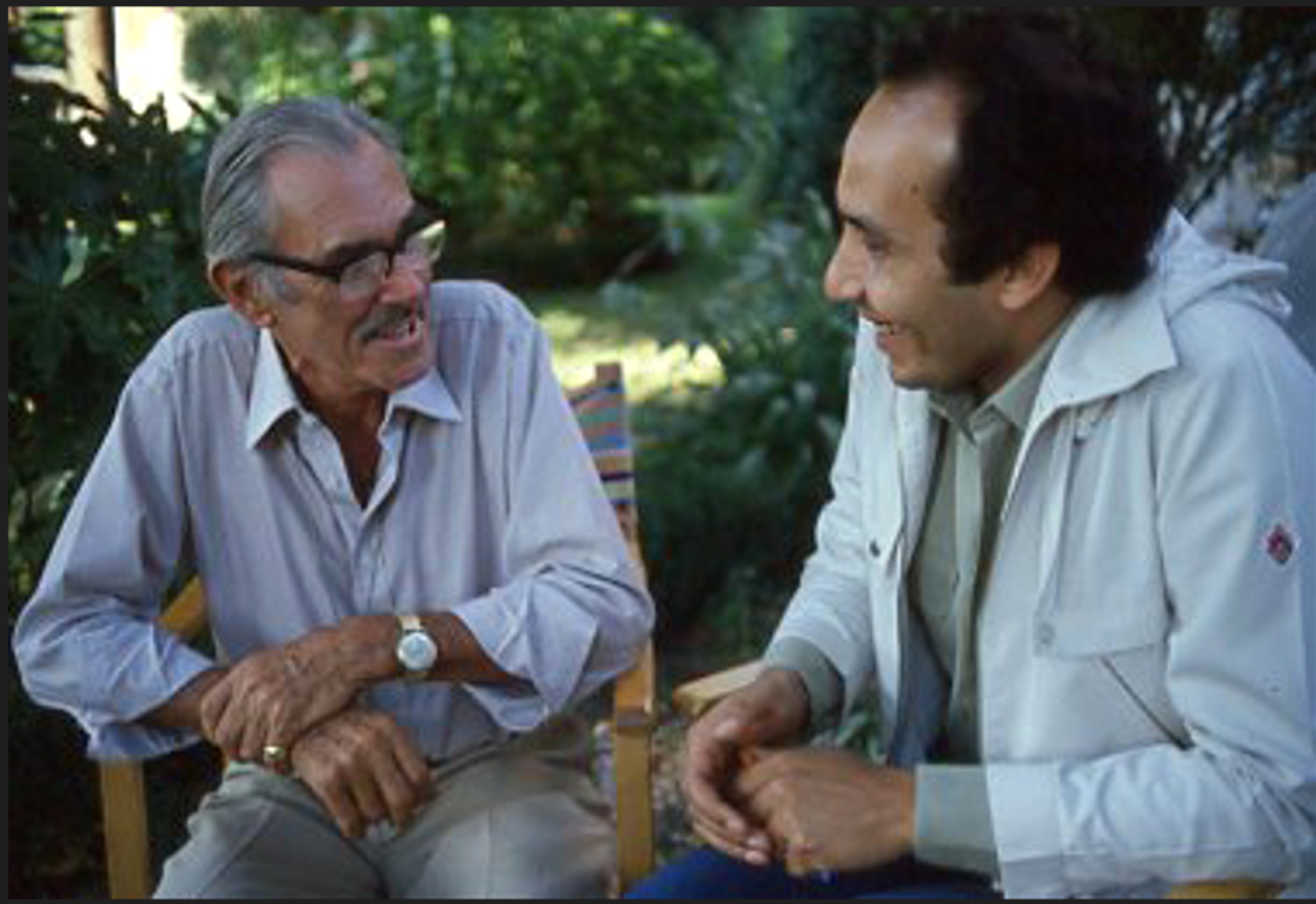
- Hildyard (left) being interviewed on location in Rome filming of Lion of the Desert (1979)
- Born: Denis John Hildyard; March 17, 1908; London, England
- Died: September 5, 1990 (aged 82); Weybridge, Surrey, England
- Occupation: Cinematographer
- Years active: 1934-1985
- Organization: British Society of Cinematographers
- Relatives: David Hildyard (brother)

Denis John "Jack" Hildyard BSC (17 March 1908 – 5 September 1990) was an English cinematographer. He worked on more than 80 films during his career, spanning from the 1930s through the 1980s, and was a founding member of the British Society of Cinematographers. He won an Academy Award for his work on The Bridge on the River Kwai (1957), and was nominated for three times for the BAFTA Award for Best British Cinematographer.

== Biography ==
Hildyard was born in London in 1908. He had a younger brother, David (1916-2008), who was a two-time Oscar winning sound engineer.

His first film was Freedom of the Seas in 1934, as a focus puller, before working as camera operator on films for Leslie Howard and others, including Pygmalion, The Divorce of Lady X and Pimpernel Smith. His first film as cinematographer was Laurence Olivier's 1944 film Henry V, which gave him invaluable experience of colour cinematography and his subsequent films made him one of the most sought after cameramen in England.

He made several films with David Lean including The Sound Barrier (1952) and Hobson's Choice (1954), as well as The Bridge on the River Kwai (1957), for which he won an Academy Award for Best Cinematography and the British Society of Cinematographers Award.

His other films included Caesar and Cleopatra (1945), Anastasia (1956), The Sundowners (1960), 55 Days at Peking (1963), Battle of the Bulge (1965), Casino Royale (1967), Topaz (1969), The Beast Must Die (1974), Emily (1976), and The Wild Geese (1978). He photographed both of producer-director Moustapha Akkad's films on Islamic history, The Message (1976) and Lion of the Desert (1981) and in 1983, director Mohamed Shukri Jameel's film, produced by Saddam Hussein, Al-Mas' Ala Al-Kubra, which was nominated for the Golden Prize at the 1983 Moscow International Film Festival.

His last cinematography credit was the made-for-television film Florence Nightingale.

== Death ==
Hildyard died in Weybridge, Surrey at the age of 82, on 5 September 1990.

== List of awards and nominations ==
Award	Year	Category	Work	Result
Academy Award	1958	Best Cinematography	The Bridge on the River Kwai	Won
BAFTA Award	1964	Best British Cinematography (Colour)	The V.I.P.s	Nominated
BAFTA Award	1965	Best British Cinematography (Colour)	The Yellow Rolls-Royce	Nominated
BAFTA Award	1967	Best British Cinematography (Colour)	Modesty Blaise	Nominated
British Society of Cinematographers	1990	Lifetime Achievement Award	—N/a	Won
