= Paul Massey (sound engineer) =

English sound engineer

- Born: 10 February 1958 (age 68); Harefield, London, England
- Occupation: Sound engineer
- Years active: 1982-present
- Children: Sean Massey, Andrew Massey, Sophie Massey

Paul Massey (born 10 February 1958) is an English sound engineer working based in Southern California. He has been nominated for ten Academy Awards in the category Best Sound. He has worked on 200-plus films since 1982. He has won the Academy Award for Best Sound Mixing in 2019 for Bohemian Rhapsody along with John Casali and Tim Cavagin. He has been nominated for 11 Academy Awards. In 2022 Massey received the Cinema Audio Society’s Career Achievement Award at the 58th annual CAS Awards.

In 2022 Massey began construction on a personal immersive mix facility. The facility was designed by Bruce Black, studio designer and acoustician, adhering to strict film industry requirements.

== Selected filmography ==
- Legends of the Fall (1994)
- All Dogs Go to Heaven 2 (1996)
- The Rock (1996)
- Liar Liar (1997)
- Air Force One (1997)
- Rugrats in Paris: The Movie (2000)
- Master and Commander: The Far Side of the World (2003)
- Walk the Line (2005)
- Pirates of the Caribbean: Dead Man's Chest (2006)
- 3:10 to Yuma (2007)
- The Martian (2015)
- Bohemian Rhapsody (2018)
- Maleficent: Mistress of Evil (2019)
- Ford v Ferrari (2019)
- No Time To Die (2021)
- Moonage Daydream (2022)
