= Brent Burge =

American sound editor

- Occupation: Sound editor
- Years active: 1984-present

Brent Burge is an American sound editor. He was nominated for an Academy Award for Best Sound Editing for the 2013 film The Hobbit: The Desolation of Smaug with fellow sound editor Chris Ward and for the 2014 film The Hobbit: The Battle of the Five Armies with fellow sound editor Jason Canovas.
