= Chris Ward (sound editor) =

New Zealand sound editor

- Born: Christopher John Ward; 22 July 1970 (age 55); Auckland, New Zealand
- Occupations: sound editor, ADR mixer
- Years active: 1995 – present

Chris Ward is a sound editor. He and fellow sound editor Brent Burge were nominated for an Academy Award for Best Sound Editing for the 2013 film The Hobbit: The Desolation of Smaug.
