= Dominick Tavella =

American sound engineer

- Occupation: Sound engineer
- Years active: 1981 – present

Dominick Tavella is an American sound engineer. He has been sound mixing since 1976 and specializes in balancing and recording the final soundtrack in its many formats for film, TV, and documentaries. D.A. Pennebaker was one of his college instructors who eventually became his mentor and later connected him to his first sound job. His first Union was as a transfer engineer, later a re-recording engineer, at DuArt Film Laboratory in New York City. There he mixed documentaries and low budget feature films. In 1988, Tavella joined Sound One where he built his reputation among clients such as Paul Schrader, Jim Jarmusch, Darren Aronofsky, Ric Burns, and Ken Burns. His documentaries, Jazz and New York were both nominated for Emmys for best sound. In 2003, he won an Oscar for Best Sound Mixing and a BAFTA for best sound for the film Chicago. He has worked on more than 180 films since 1981.

== Filmography ==
Film	Year
Pi	1998
Chicago	2002
Uptown Girls	2003
Vanity Fair	2004
Infamous	2006
The Fountain	2006
Penelope	2006
Definitely, Maybe	2008
Mamma Mia!	2008
The Wrestler	2008
Winter's Bone	2010
Black Swan	2010
The Wolf of Wall Street	2013
Noah	2014
Rock the Kasbah	2015
The Queen of Katwe	2016
