= Julian Slater =

English sound designer

Julian Slater is an English sound designer, known for his work in films Scott Pilgrim vs. the World, Mad Max: Fury Road, Hilary and Jackie and Baby Driver for which he was nominated for Academy Award for Best Sound Editing and Sound Mixing (co-nominated with Tim Cavagin and Mary H. Ellis)
