= Gethin Creagh =

New Zealand sound engineer

- Occupation: Sound engineer
- Years active: 1967–present

Gethin Creagh is a New Zealand sound engineer. He was nominated for an Academy Award in the category Best Sound for the film The Lord of the Rings: The Fellowship of the Ring. He has worked on more than 130 films, TV dramas and documentaries since 1967.

== Selected filmography ==
- The Lord of the Rings: The Fellowship of the Ring (2001)
