= John Midgley =

British sound engineer

- Occupation: Sound engineer
- Years active: 1977–present

John Midgley is an English sound engineer. He won an Oscar in the category Best Sound Mixing for Hugo and has been nominated for another two. He has worked on more than 100 films since 1977.

== Filmography ==
- Xtro (1983)
- The Cold Room (1984)
- Fairly Secret Army (1984)
- Howling II: Your Sister Is a Werewolf (1985)
- Hellraiser (1987)
- Hellbound: Hellraiser II (1988)
- Diamond Skulls (1989)
- Getting It Right (1989)
- Nightbreed (1990)
- FairyTale: A True Story (1997)
- Mortal Kombat Annihilation (1997)
- Sliding Doors (1998)
- Brokedown Palace (1999)
- Sex, Chips & Rock n' Roll (1999)
- Star Wars: Episode I – The Phantom Menace (1999)
- Saving Grace (2000)
- Harry Potter and the Philosopher's Stone (2001)
- Harry Potter and the Chamber of Secrets (2002)
- The Importance of Being Earnest (2002)
- Harry Potter and the Prisoner of Azkaban (2004)
- Children of Men (2006)
- The King's Speech (2010)
- Hugo (2011)
- The Imitation Game (2014)
- Doctor Strange (2016)
- Paddington 2 (2017)
- Phantom Thread (2017)
- Christopher Robin (2018)
- Detective Pikachu (2019)
- Pinocchio (2022)
- Luther: The Fallen Sun (2023)
- Here (2024)
- The Family Plan 2 (2025)
