= Louis Edemann =

American sound editor (1946–2006)

- Born: Louis Lee Edemann; February 2, 1946; Van Nuys, California, USA
- Died: April 12, 2006 (aged 60); Sylmar, California, USA
- Other name: Louis L. Edemann
- Occupation: Sound editor
- Years active: 1978-2002
- Spouse: Patricia (1970 - 12 April 2006) (his death) (4 children)
- Children: 4

Louis Edemann (February 2, 1946 – April 12, 2006) was an American sound editor. He won the Academy Award for Best Sound Editing during the 61st Academy Awards. He won for the film Who Framed Roger Rabbit, he shared his Oscar with Charles L. Campbell.

== Selected filmography ==
- The Hunchback of Notre Dame II (2002)
- The Tigger Movie (2000)
- The Adventures of Elmo in Grouchland (1999)
- Doug's First Movie (1999)
- Amistad (1997)
- The Rock (1996)
- The Client (1994)
- The River Wild (1994)
- Falling Down (1993)
- In the Name of the Father (1993)
- Schindler's List (1993)
- The Three Musketeers (1993)
- A Few Good Men (1992)
- Freejack (1992)
- Hoffa (1992)
- The Mighty Ducks (1992)
- An American Tail: Fievel Goes West (1991)
- City Slickers (1991)
- Hook (1991)
- The Rocketeer (1991)
- Back to the Future Part III (1990)
- DuckTales the Movie: Treasure of the Lost Lamp (1990)
- Flatliners (1990)
- Misery (1990)
- The Rescuers Down Under (1990)
- Young Guns II (1990)
- Back to the Future Part II (1989)
- The Little Mermaid (1989)
- When Harry Met Sally... (1989)
- Who Framed Roger Rabbit (1988)
- Empire of the Sun (1987)
- The Lost Boys (1987)
- The Running Man (1987)
- An American Tail (1986)
- The Money Pit (1986)
- Three Amigos (1986)
- Romancing the Stone (1984)
- Flashdance (1983)
- E.T. the Extra-Terrestrial (1982)
