= Myron Nettinga =

American sound engineer (born 1967)

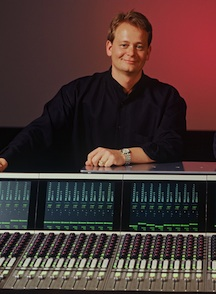
- Born: 1967 (age 58–59)
- Occupation: Sound engineer
- Years active: 1989-present

Myron Nettinga (born 1967) is an American sound engineer. He graduated from the University of Miami with a degree in Music Engineering. He won an Academy Award for Best Sound for the film Black Hawk Down. He has worked on more than 100 films since 1992.

== Selected filmography ==
- The Firm (1993)
- Black Hawk Down (2001)
- Kill Bill: Volume 1 (2003)
- Kill Bill: Volume 2 (2004)
- Collateral (2004)
- Team America: World Police (2004)
- Kingdom of Heaven (2005)
- American Hustle (2013)
