= Mike Hopkins (sound editor) =

New Zealand sound editor (1959–2012)

- Born: Michael Alexander Hopkins; 12 August 1959; Greytown, Wellington, New Zealand
- Died: 30 December 2012 (aged 53) near Greytown, Wellington, New Zealand
- Occupation: Sound editor
- Awards: Academy Award for Best Sound Editing (2002 & 2005)

Michael Alexander Hopkins (12 August 1959 – 30 December 2012) was a New Zealand sound editor. Hopkins and American Ethan Van der Ryn shared two Academy Awards for best sound editing on the films The Lord of the Rings: The Two Towers and King Kong. The pair were also nominated for their work on the 2007 film Transformers.

Hopkins died on 30 December 2012 after the raft he was in capsized in a flash flood on the Waiohine River, near his hometown of Greytown.
