= Nat Boxer =

American sound engineer

- Born: June 22, 1925; Wawarsing, New York, U.S.
- Died: December 3, 2009 (aged 84); Rosendale, New York, U.S.
- Occupation: Sound engineer
- Years active: 1965-1987

Nat Boxer (June 22, 1925 – December 3, 2009) was an American sound engineer. He won an Academy Award for Best Sound for the film Apocalypse Now.

== Selected filmography ==
- Apocalypse Now (1979)
