= Robert Glass (sound engineer) =

American sound engineer

- Born: December 4, 1939; Barre, Vermont, USA
- Died: July 21, 1993 (aged 53); Los Feliz, Los Angeles
- Occupation: Sound engineer
- Years active: 1976-1993

Robert Glass (December 4, 1939 – July 21, 1993) was an American sound engineer. He won an Academy Award for Best Sound and was nominated for five more in the same category. He has worked on many films since 1976. Glass was found stabbed to death in his flat in Los Feliz, Los Angeles on July 21, 1993.

== Selected filmography ==
Glass won an Academy Award for Best Sound and was nominated for another five:

Won

- E.T. the Extra-Terrestrial (1982)

Nominated

- A Star Is Born (1976)
- Sorcerer (1977)
- Close Encounters of the Third Kind (1977)
- Hooper (1978)
- 1941 (1979)
