= Dick Vorisek =

American sound engineer

- Born: Richard Vorisek; February 21, 1918; The Bronx, New York, U.S.
- Died: November 7, 1989 (aged 71); Stamford, Connecticut, U.S.
- Occupation: Sound engineer
- Years active: 1947–1988

Dick Vorisek (February 21, 1918 – November 7, 1989) was an American sound engineer. He was nominated for an Academy Award in the category Best Sound for the film Reds. He worked on over 130 films between 1947 and 1988.

== Selected filmography ==
- Reds (1981)
