= Don Sharpe =

Sound editor

- Born: Roy Donald Sharpe; 4 July 1929
- Died: November 13, 2004 (aged 75); Hillingdon, Middlesex, England
- Other names: Don Sharp; Donald Sharpe
- Occupation: Sound editor
- Years active: 1947–1997

Don Sharpe (4 July 1929 – 13 November 2004) was a sound editor. He won for the film Aliens for Best Sound Editing at the 1986 Academy Awards. He had over 90 editing credits over his 50-year career. He also won the BAFTA Award for sound for the film The French Lieutenant's Woman.

== Selected filmography ==
- Inventing the Abbotts (1997)
- Year of the Comet (1992)
- Batman (1989)
- Gorillas in the Mist (1988)
- Aliens (1986)
- Santa Claus: The Movie (1985)
- Superman III (1983)
- An American Werewolf in London (1981)
- The French Lieutenant's Woman (1981)
- Superman II (1980)
- Jesus of Nazareth (1977)
- Robin and Marian (1976)
- The Land that Time Forgot (1975)
- The Three Musketeers (1973)
- Sleuth (1972)
- Anne of the Thousand Days (1969)
