= Bill Varney =

American sound mixer (1934–2011)

- Born: Harold William Varney; January 22, 1934; Beverly, Massachusetts, U.S.
- Died: April 2, 2011 (aged 77); Fairhope, Alabama, U.S.
- Occupation: Sound mixer
- Years active: 1972–2011
- Spouse: Suzanne Varney (1 child)

Harold William Varney (January 22, 1934 – April 2, 2011) was an American motion picture sound mixer. A two-time Academy Award winner, Varney shared the Academy Award for Best Sound Mixing for Star Wars: Episode V - The Empire Strikes Back in 1980 and Raiders of the Lost Ark in 1981. Varney also received Academy Award for Best Sound Mixing nominations for his collaborative sound mixing on Dune in 1984 and Back to the Future in 1985.

== Life and career ==
Varney was born on January 22, 1934, in Beverly, Massachusetts.

One of Varney's earliest projects was a film focusing on singer Joan Baez during the 1950s. Baez's father was a physics professor at the Massachusetts Institute of Technology. Varney relocated to southern California in 1961, where he produced educational films for Encyclopædia Britannica.

Varney transitioned to film and television sound mixing in 1972. He worked on approximately 85 productions over the next twenty-five years. He worked at The Samuel Goldwyn Company for fourteen years, until he joined Universal Pictures in 1985.

Varney won collaborative back-to-back Academy Awards for Best Sound for Star Wars: Episode V - The Empire Strikes Back in 1980 and Raiders of the Lost Ark in 1981. He also received nominations for Dune in 1984 and Back to the Future in 1985. Additionally, Varney was nominated an Emmy Award for his sound work on the 1977 television miniseries, Roots.

Varney's numerous film credits included The Last Waltz in 1978, Grease in 1978, Ordinary People in 1980, Poltergeist and My Favorite Year, both released in 1982, and Dragonheart in 1996.

By 1998, he had risen to become the Vice President of Sound Operations for Universal Pictures. That same year, Varney collaborated on the sound re-editing for the 1958 Orson Welles film, Touch of Evil. Welles had been replaced from the film during its post-production, and was never allowed to cut Touch of Evil the way he had originally intended. Rick Schmidlin produced the re-edit for Universal Pictures based on a 58-page lost memo written by Welles a year before the film was released. Varney spearheaded the sound restoration for the 1998 directors cut re-release of Touch of Evil. Varney used "digital processing to bring the 40-year-old soundtracks to a new level of clarity," according to Walter Murch, who worked as the sound editor and sound mixer for the 1998 re-release.

Varney retired from Universal Studios in 2001 and moved to Fairhope, Alabama in 2003.

Varney died on April 2, 2011, of congestive heart failure in Fairhope at the age of 77. He was survived by his wife, Suzanne, and daughter, Lisa.
