= Bill Rowe (sound engineer) =

English sound engineer

- Born: William Oliver Rowe; 2 February 1931; Crook, County Durham, England
- Died: 29 September 1992 (aged 61); Northwood, Middlesex, England
- Occupation: Sound engineer
- Years active: 1955–1992

William Oliver Rowe (2 February 1931 – 29 September 1992) was an English sound engineer. He won a BAFTA Award for Best Sound in 1985 for The Killing Fields and an Academy Award for Best Sound Mixing for The Last Emperor in 1988. He worked on more than 160 films between 1955 and 1992.

== Selected filmography ==
- The Killing Fields (1984)
- The Last Emperor (1987)
