= Roy Charman =

English sound engineer

- Born: Roy James Charman; 31 May 1930; Battersea, London, England
- Died: 4 October 1990 (aged 60); Hillingdon, Middlesex, England
- Occupation: Sound engineer
- Years active: 1956–1990

Roy Charman (31 May 1930 – 4 October 1990) was an English sound engineer. He won an Academy Award for Best Sound and was nominated for three more in the same category.

== Selected filmography ==
Charman won an Academy Award and was nominated for three more:

Won

- Raiders of the Lost Ark (1981)

Nominated

- The Wind and the Lion (1975)
- Superman (1978)
- Aliens (1986)
