= Michael J. Kohut =

American sound engineer

- Born: June 8, 1943
- Died: 2012 (aged 68–69)
- Occupations: President, Digital Post Production Facilities, Sony Pictures Studios and Sound Rerecording Mixer
- Years active: 1965-2008

Michael J. Kohut (June 8, 1943 – 2012) was an American audio engineer. He was a seven-time Academy Award nominee for Best Sound, a BAFTA award winner for Best Sound for Fame and was President of Post Production Facilities at Sony Pictures Studios. During his tenure at Sony Pictures Studios, he led the American team in the development of Sony Dynamic Digital Sound the discrete eight-channel playback system for motion picture sound.

Kohut was a sound rerecording mixer for over eighty feature films and several television shows. He was honored with a Career Achievement Award by the Cinema Audio Society, several Cinema Audio Society Award wins and nominations, and was included in the "In Memoriam" tribute of the Academy Awards broadcast in 2013.

== Early life and career ==
Michael John Kohut moved to Los Angeles from Canada, the son of Ukrainian immigrants. He and his wife, Francine, have two sons, Tateum and Tyson. Tateum Kohut, is an Emmy-nominated sound re-recording mixer for his work on True Detective and Cinema Audio Society Award winner for The Blues.

Michael J. Kohut started his 40+ year career at MGM in 1965 as a production sound cable operator, a boom operator, and worked on location in Hawaii for the original Hawaii Five-O series on CBS. After working on several television series, including Medical Center and several television movies, including Roe vs. Wade, Kohut transitioned from mixing for television to sound mixing for motion pictures.

== Professional experience ==
In addition to the seven films for which he was nominated for the Academy Award for Best Sound Mixing, Meteor, Fame, Pennies from Heaven, WarGames, 2010: The Year We Make Contact, RoboCop and Total Recall, Kohut was re-recording mixer for award-winning feature films Rich and Famous directed by George Cukor, Prince of Tides directed by Barbra Streisand, Dead Poets Society directed by Peter Weir, and Basic Instinct directed by Paul Verhoeven. Among his other feature film credits are Rocky IV directed by Sylvester Stallone, Farewell to the King directed by John Milius, The Presidio directed by Peter Hyams, and The War of the Roses and Throw Mama from the Train, both directed by Danny DeVito.

In 1988, the physical property for the MGM Studios in Culver City, California was sold to Lorimar-Telepictures in 1988 after a brief three-month ownership by Turner. Kohut was promoted to Sound Director of Lorimar Post Production Facilities, in addition to continuing his role of lead mixer on the storied Cary Grant Theatre dub stage. EVP, Post Production Facilities, Charles A. Silvers promoted Kohut to VP, Post Production Facilities, expanding Kohut's duties to cover post production sound and editorial, over 100 cutting rooms, 7 dub stages, 2 ADR and 2 Foley stages, in addition to his sound mixing duties.

During the Lorimar years, Kohut transitioned the sound editorial department from traditional film cutting to digital post production with the introduction of Waveframe Digital Audio Workstations. He designed a campaign challenging competitors to step into the digital realm by showing Dallas editor Fred W. Berger, already in his 80s, proclaiming that it was never too late to learn new technology.

When Sony Corporation purchased the Lorimar studio property in 1990, Silvers retired and Kohut was promoted to SVP, as Post Production Facilities continued to expand to encompass 25% of the 44-acre lot, adding dub stages and digital editing rooms and renovating existing facilities. Sony, a leading electronics company, sought to expand its product line with the acquisition of the studio, and Kohut lead the American development team at the studio, Dana Wood, Jeffrey E. Taylor, Stanley Wiegand, Mark Koffman, and Melissa J. L. Smith, in the development of the Sony Dynamic Digital Sound system, which made its debut in the film Last Action Hero directed by John McTiernan for Columbia Pictures, a division of Sony. The technology was rolled out in the AMC theater chain and used a laser to direct focused beams of light. A patent for the technology was issued in 1998.

Kohut retired from post production sound mixing as his managerial workload grew when he was promoted to Executive Vice President, then President of Post Production Facilities for Sony Pictures Studios, continuing the department's expansion including the William Holden Theatre.

Kohut's achievements in sound was summarized in a 1996 article in which he recounted, "I worked with Paul Verhoeven on the first Robocop. At the end of the movie, I recall Paul saying to me: 'Mike, sound was 60% of this movie.' It was a great feeling."

== Selected filmography ==
- Meteor (1979)
- Fame (1980)
- Pennies from Heaven (1981)
- WarGames (1983)
- 2010: The Year We Make Contact (1984)
- RoboCop (1987)
- Total Recall (1990)
