= Gonzalo Gavira =

- Born: 30 October 1925
- Died: 9 January 2005 (aged 79); Mexico City, Mexico
- Occupation: Film sound technician

Gonzalo Gavira (October 30, 1925 – January 9, 2005) was a Mexican film sound technician. He is known for being part of the team that won an Academy Award for Best Sound Mixing for the 1973 film The Exorcist. Gavira worked on at least 60 films in Mexico and elsewhere, including Sergio Leone's The Good, the Bad, and the Ugly (1966), Alejandro Jodorowsky's El Topo (1970), and the disaster film The Towering Inferno (1974).

While working in the United States, Gavira had an assistant named Ruben C. Bustamante, whom Gavira referred to as invaluable. In 1975, Gavira was awarded the Silver Ariel, which is the highest award that can be received from Mexican theatre. Mexican film actor Cantinflas classified Gavira as a genius. Gavira died in 2005 from circulation problems.
