= Tom Overton =

American sound engineer

- Born: April 14, 1930; North Carolina, USA
- Died: May 4, 1988 (aged 58); Los Angeles, California, USA
- Occupation: Sound engineer
- Years active: 1959-1988

Tom Overton (April 14, 1930 – May 4, 1988) was an American sound engineer. He was nominated for an Academy Award in the category Best Sound for the film A Star Is Born.

== Selected filmography ==
- The Last Picture Show (1971)
- The Last Detail (1973)
- A Star Is Born (1976)
- Audrey Rose (1977)
- American Hot Wax (1978)
- Heaven Can Wait (1978)
- Airplane! (1980)
- Airplane II: The Sequel (1982)
