= Danny Michael =

American sound engineer

- Occupation: Sound engineer
- Years active: 1976-present

Danny Michael is an American sound engineer. He was nominated for an Academy Award in the category Best Sound for the film Mississippi Burning. He has worked on nearly 90 films since 1976.

== Selected filmography ==
- Mississippi Burning (1988)
- Glengarry Glen Ross (1992)
- Scent of a Woman (1992)
- The Paper (1994)
- Nobody's Fool (1994)
- Sabrina (1995)
- Ransom (1996)
- Marvin's Room (1996)
- Meet Joe Black (1998)
- Shaft (2000)
- Hannibal (2001)
- Zoolander (2001)
- 8 Mile (2002)
- School of Rock (2003)
- The Stepford Wives (2004)
- The Departed (2006)
- Doubt (2008)
- Revolutionary Road (2008)
- John Wick (2014)
