= Larry Jost =

American sound engineer

- Born: February 22, 1921; Detroit, Michigan, U.S.
- Died: October 28, 2001 (aged 80); Kelseyville, California, U.S.
- Occupation: Sound engineer
- Years active: 1961-1984

Larry Jost (February 22, 1921 – October 28, 2001) was an American sound engineer. He was nominated for three Academy Awards in the category Best Sound for the films The Day of the Dolphin, The Paper Chase and Chinatown. He worked on over 45 films between 1961 and 1984.

== Selected filmography ==
- The Day of the Dolphin (1973)
- The Paper Chase (1973)
- Chinatown (1974)
