= Jean-Louis Ducarme =

French sound engineer

- Occupation: Sound engineer
- Years active: 1968-1994

Jean-Louis Ducarme is a French sound engineer. He was nominated for an Academy Award in the category Best Sound for the film Sorcerer.

== Selected filmography ==
- Sorcerer (1977)
