= Frederick Brown (sound editor) =

American sound editor

- Born: Frederick Joseph Brown; April 7, 1935; Los Angeles, California, USA
- Died: November 9, 2003 (aged 68); Northridge, California, USA
- Other names: Fred Brown; Fred J. Brown; Frederick J. Brown
- Occupation: Sound editor
- Years active: 1956-1997

Frederick Brown (April 7, 1935 – November 9, 2003) was an American sound editor. He was nominated for the film Rambo: First Blood Part II at the 58th Academy Awards in the category of Best Sound Editing.

He received the Career Achievement Award at the Motion Picture Sound Editors awards in 2002. He also received an Emmy Award for the made-for-TV film The Red Pony.

He had over 70 credits in TV and film.
