= Dan Wallin =

American sound engineer (1927–2024)

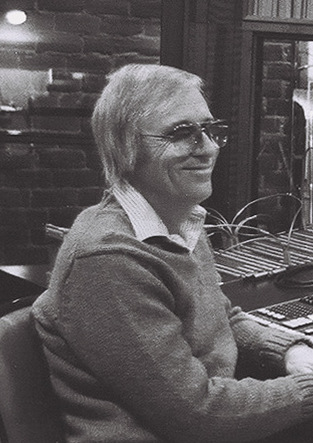
- Wallin in 1980
- Born: Daniel Guy Wallin; March 13, 1927; Los Angeles, California, U.S.
- Died: April 10, 2024 (aged 97); Hawaii, U.S.
- Occupation: Sound engineer
- Years active: 1965–2021

Daniel Guy Wallin (March 13, 1927 – April 10, 2024) was an American sound engineer. He was nominated for two Academy Awards in the category Best Sound. Wallin is widely considered one of the most prolific and greatest sound engineers of all time. He had worked on more than 500 films since 1965, working into his eighties.

Wallin died in Hawaii, where he had retired, on April 10, 2024, at the age of 97.

At the 97th Academy Awards, his name was mentioned in the In Memoriam section.

== Selected filmography ==
- Woodstock (1970)
- A Star Is Born (1976)
