= Robert Knudson =

American sound engineer

- Born: Robert Irving Knudson; September 29, 1925; Los Angeles, California, U.S.
- Died: January 21, 2006 (aged 80); Columbia, South Carolina, U.S.
- Occupation: Sound engineer
- Years active: 1963–1995

Robert Knudson (September 29, 1925 – January 21, 2006) was an American sound engineer. He won three Academy Awards for Best Sound and was nominated for seven more in the same category. He worked on more than 100 films between 1963 and 1995.

== Selected filmography ==
Knudson won three Academy Awards and was nominated for seven more:

Won

- Cabaret (1972)
- The Exorcist (1973)
- E.T. the Extra-Terrestrial (1982)

Nominated

- A Star Is Born (1976)
- Sorcerer (1977)
- Close Encounters of the Third Kind (1977)
- Hooper (1978)
- 1941 (1979)
- Empire of the Sun (1987)
- Who Framed Roger Rabbit (1988)
