= David Hildyard (sound engineer) =

English sound engineer

- Born: David Beart Hildyard; 15 May 1916; London, England
- Died: 19 February 2008 (aged 91); Jičín, Czech Republic
- Occupation: Sound engineer
- Years active: 1946–1992

David Beart Hildyard (15 May 1916 – 19 February 2008) was an English sound engineer. He won two Academy Awards in the category Best Sound. His brother, Jack Hildyard, was a British cinematographer who worked on more than 80 films during his career.

== Selected filmography ==
- Fiddler on the Roof (1971)
- Cabaret (1972)
