= John Casali =

British-American sound engineer

- Occupation: Sound engineer

John Casali is a British-American sound engineer. He won an Academy Award in the category Best Sound for the film Bohemian Rhapsody.
