= Chris Newman (sound engineer) =

American sound mixer and director (1940–2025)

- Born: February 17, 1940; New York City, U.S.
- Died: February 3, 2025 (aged 84)
- Occupation: Sound engineer
- Years active: 1966–2025

Chris Newman (February 17, 1940 – February 3, 2025) was an American sound mixer and director. His film credits include The Godfather, Amadeus, The Exorcist, The Silence of the Lambs, and The English Patient.

== Life and career ==
Newman won three Academy Awards for Best Sound and was nominated for five more in the same category.

Newman resided in New Jersey and, for several decades, taught at the School of Visual Arts, New York City. He died on February 3, 2025, at the age of 84. At the 97th Academy Awards, his name was mentioned in the In Memoriam section.

== Selected filmography ==
Newman won three Academy Awards and was nominated for five more:

=== Won ===
- The Exorcist (1973)
- Amadeus (1984)
- The English Patient (1996)

=== Nominated ===
- The French Connection (1971)
- The Godfather (1972)
- Fame (1980)
- A Chorus Line (1985)
- The Silence of the Lambs (1991)
