= Robin O'Donoghue =

English sound engineer

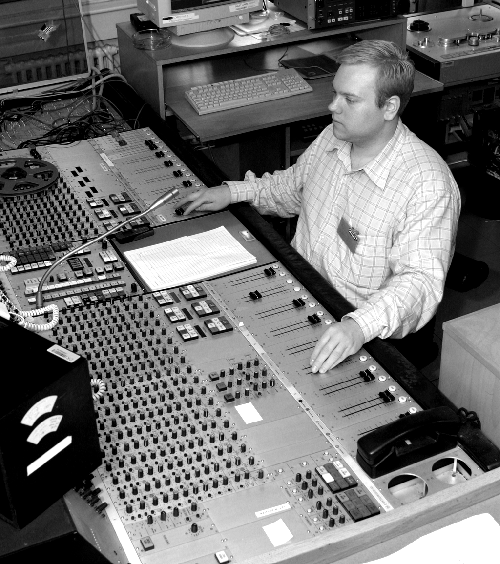
- O'Donoghue working on the mixing desk for Shakespeare In Love
- Born: Uxbridge, Middlesex, England
- Occupation: Sound engineer
- Years active: 1966-present

Robin O'Donoghue is an English sound engineer. He has been nominated for two Academy Awards in the category Best Sound. He has worked on over 130 films since 1966.

== Selected filmography ==
- Gandhi (1982)
- Shakespeare in Love (1998)
