= Theodore Soderberg (1923–2012) =

American sound engineer

- Born: Theodore George Soderberg; January 8, 1923; Los Angeles, California, U.S.
- Died: November 15, 2012 (aged 89)
- Occupation: Sound engineer
- Years active: 1970-1986

Theodore George Soderberg (January 8, 1923 – November 15, 2012) was an American sound engineer. He was nominated for five Academy Awards in the category Sound Recording. He also won two Primetime Emmy Awards and was nominated for another one in the category Outstanding Sound Mixing.

== Selected filmography ==
- Patton (1970)
- Vanishing Point (1971)
- The French Connection (1971)
- The Poseidon Adventure (1972)
- Harry and Tonto (1974)
- The Towering Inferno (1975)
- The Other Side of Midnight (1977)
- The Turning Point (1977)
- The Rose (1979)
- Revenge of the Nerds (1984)
