= Ivan Sharrock =

English sound engineer

- Born: 17 July 1941 (age 84)
- Occupation: Sound engineer
- Years active: 1967-present

Ivan Sharrock (born 17 July 1941) is an English sound engineer. He won an Oscar for Best Sound and has been nominated for three more in the same category. He has worked on more than 100 films since 1967.

He served as sound recordist on the documentary Kenyatta, part of the Black Man's Land Trilogy.

== Selected filmography ==
Sharrock won an Academy Award for Best Sound and has been nominated for three more:

Won

- The Last Emperor (1987)

Nominated

- U-571 (2000)
- Gangs of New York (2002)
- Blood Diamond (2006)
