= Jim Webb (sound engineer) =

American sound engineer

- Born: James E. Webb
- Occupation: audio engineer
- Years active: 1971-2000

Jim Webb is an American film audio engineer. He won an Academy Award for Best Sound and was nominated for another one in the same category.

== Selected filmography ==
Webb won an Academy Award for Best Sound and was nominated for another:

Won

- All the President's Men (1976)

Nominated

- The Rose (1979)

== Personal life ==
Webb graduated in 1962 from the Audio Engineering Society.
