= Gerry Humphreys =

Sound engineer

- Born: 11 May 1931; Llandrindod Wells, Wales
- Died: 5 December 2006 (aged 75); London, England
- Occupation: Sound engineer
- Years active: 1952–2002

Gerry Humphreys OBE (11 May 1931 – 5 December 2006) was a Welsh sound engineer. He won BAFTA Film Awards for Best Sound for A Bridge Too Far and Cry Freedom, was nominated for the BAFTA Award for Best Sound for Sunday Bloody Sunday, Gandhi, Blade Runner, and A Chorus Line, as well as receiving Oscar nominations in the category Best Sound for Gandhi and A Chorus Line and an Australian Film Institute Award nomination for Best Sound for The Chant of Jimmie Blacksmith. He worked on 250 films between 1952 and 2002. He was appointed OBE in the 1995 New Year Honours.

== Selected filmography ==
- Repulsion (1965)
- A Funny Thing Happened on the Way to the Forum (1966)
- The Italian Job (1969)
- Sunday Bloody Sunday (1971)
- A Bridge Too Far (1977)
- The Chant of Jimmie Blacksmith (1978)
- Blade Runner (1982)
- Gandhi (1982)
- A Chorus Line (1985)
- A Fish Called Wanda (1988)
- Madame Sousatzka (1988)
- Shirley Valentine (1989)
- The Witches (1990)
- The Krays (1990)
- Let Him Have It (1991)
