= Gordon McCallum =

American-born English sound engineer

- Born: Gordon Keith McCallum; 26 May 1919; Chicago, Illinois, United States
- Died: 10 September 1989 (aged 70); Dorset, England
- Occupation: Sound engineer
- Years active: 1944–1985

Gordon McCallum (26 May 1919 – 10 September 1989) was an American-born English sound engineer. He won an Academy Award for Best Sound and was nominated for three more in the same category. He worked on more than 300 films between 1944 and 1985.

== Selected filmography ==
McCallum won an Academy Award and was nominated for three more:

Won

- Fiddler on the Roof (1971)

Nominated

- Ryan's Daughter (1970)
- Diamonds Are Forever (1971)
- Superman (1978)
