= Simon Kaye =

British sound engineer

- Born: 22 July 1935 (age 90); London, England
- Occupation: Sound engineer
- Years active: 1959 – present

Simon Kaye (born 22 July 1935) is a British sound engineer. He won two Academy Awards for Best Sound and has been nominated for another two in the same category. He has also won three BAFTAs for Best Sound and was nominated for a further six in the same category. He has worked on over 70 films since 1959.

== Selected filmography ==
Kaye won two Academy Awards for Best Sound and has been nominated for two more:

Won

- Platoon (1986)
- The Last of the Mohicans (1992)

Nominated

- Reds (1981)
- Gandhi (1982)

Simon Kaye won three BAFTAs for Best Sound and was nominated for a further six Awards in the same category.

Won

- Oh! What a Lovely War (1970)
- A Bridge Too Far (1978)
- Cry Freedom (1988)

Nominated

- The Lion in Winter (1969)
- The Charge of the Light Brigade (1969)
- Sunday Bloody Sunday (1972)
- Gandhi (1983)
- Indiana Jones and the Temple of Doom (1985)
- The Last of the Mohicans (1993)
