= Soundelux =

American audio post production company

- Industry: post-production / music
- Founded: 1982; 2021 (relaunch)
- Headquarters: Hollywood, California, United States
- Website: www.soundelux.com

Soundelux is an American audio post production company based in California, a previous member of the Todd Soundelux group of sound companies. The Soundelux library and trademark was bought in 2014 by Sounddogs. In 2021, original founders Lon Bender and Wylie Stateman came together to launch the new Soundelux, which restarted in sound editing production with episodes of HBO's Euphoria.

The post production company provides audio services to clients working in feature films and television.

== History ==
Lon Bender and Wylie Stateman founded Soundelux in 1982, focused on audio post production for the film industry. In 1991, they partnered with John Miceli, Tony Miceli, and David Kneupper to create the Soundelux Entertainment Group and expanded their business on the East Coast and into the growing special venue industry.

In 1992, Scott Martin Gershin partnered with Bender and Stateman and Bender to create Soundelux Media Labs, which eventually became Soundelux Design Music Group (DMG), supplying sound design, voice over casting, and music composition to the interactive entertainment industry. Together, they continued developing additional business units.

In November 1995, Jeffrey Edell, the business management partner for Bender, Stateman and Soundelux at accounting firm Duitch and Franklin LLP, joined Soundelux as CEO and helped consolidate 13 separate companies into one group, called Soundelux Entertainment Group. During Edell's tenure and until the sale of the company to John Malone's Liberty Media Group, the company grew to over $120M in revenue, with almost 500 employees at its peak.

On June 9, 2000, Liberty Media Group acquired the post production and sound business of Soundelux Entertainment Group for $90M cash, a deal to replace one agreed to in July 1999 for stock then valued at $200M. The purchase excluded Soundelux Showorks & Soundelux Florida, the company's location-based entertainment and theater design businesses. These businesses were debt free at the close of the acquisition and positioned for long term growth in an emerging industry. Tony Miceli departed in 2000 to explore new opportunities.

In 2001, John Miceli broke off of the remaining Soundlelux Media Group company and formed Technomedia to build on the immersive media experience business that was emerging.

The remaining business unit continued under the direction of Jeff Edell, who assigned Phil Rafnson the direction of Soundelux Showorks, Soundelux Florida group until they filed for bankruptcy in 2002.

The same year, Liberty Media Group rebranded itself as Ascent Media Group. The move was made to raise the company's profile in Hollywood. Soundelux was part of the Creative Services division, along with Todd-AO, Riot, Company 3, Method, Encore, Level 3 and POP.

In October 2008, the Creative Sound Services group broke away from Ascent Media Group and the Discovery Holding Company to create CSS Studios LLC, a wholly owned subsidiary of Discovery Communications. The services of CSS Studios are marketed under the brand names Soundelux, Todd-AO,Sound One, POP Sound, Modern Music, Soundelux Design Music Group, and The Hollywood Edge. CSS Studios maintain facilities in Los Angeles and New York.

On September 19, 2012, Empire Investment Holdings announced it had acquired CSS Studios, LLC.

In January 2013, CSS Studios announced it would rename the company as TODD-SOUNDELUX.

On May 21, 2014, Todd-Soundelux Filed for Chapter 11 Bankruptcy Protection.

On November 17, 2014, the Todd-Soundelux Trademarks (Todd AO and Soundelux) and Copyrights (Sound Effects Library) were acquired in Federal Bankruptcy Court (Central District Case No. 2:14-bk-19980) by Rob Nokes of Sounddogs.com, Inc.

== Relaunch ==
In 2021, original founders Bender and Stateman came together to relaunch the new Soundelux, which restarted in sound editing production with episodes of HBO's Euphoria.

== Overseas ==
Until 2010, Soundelux operated a facility in London. Much like its U.S.-based operations, Soundelux London had a sound design and editing facility. Eddy Joseph, the facility's leading creative force, has been nominated for multiple BAFTA and MPSE Awards. His work on the 2008 James Bond film Quantum of Solace earned him an Academy Award nomination. In 2009, Joseph was awarded Best UK Film Sound Editor/Designer at the UK Screen Sound Awards.

== Notable staff ==
- Wylie Stateman
- Lon E. Bender
- John Miceli
- Karen Baker Landers
- Tony Miceli
- Mark Stoeckinger
- Dave McMoyler
- Andrew DeCristofaro
- Becky Sullivan
- Tom Bellfort
- Alan Rankin

== Partial filmography ==
=== 1990s ===
- Home Alone (1990)
- JFK (1991)
- Home Alone 2: Lost in New York (1992)
- Mrs. Doubtfire (1993)
- The Crow (1994)
- Natural Born Killers (1994)
- The Pagemaster (1994)
- Braveheart (1995)
- Pocahontas (1995)
- The Hunchback of Notre Dame (1996)
- Godzilla (1998)
- Mulan (1998)
- Tarzan (1999)
- Inspector Gadget (1999)

=== 2010s ===
- Pacific Rim (2013)

== Industry recognition ==
The audio professionals working out of Soundelux have earned hundreds of notable industry nominations and awards. Here are some highlights:

Year	Award	Category	Type	Title	Honorees
2013	Academy Award	Best Sound Editing	Won	Skyfall	Per Hallberg, Karen Baker Landers
2013	Academy Award	Best Sound Editing	Nominated	Django Unchained	Wylie Stateman
2013	BAFTA Award	Best Sound	Nominated	Skyfall	Per Hallberg, Karen Baker Landers, Scott Millan, Gregg Russell, Stuart Wilson
2013	BAFTA Award	Best Sound	Nominated	Django Unchained	Wylie Stateman, Michael Minkler, Tony Lamberti, Mark Ulano
2012	Emmy Award	Outstanding Sound Editing for a Series	Won	Game of Thrones, Blackwater	Peter Brown, Kira Roessler, Tim Hands, Paul Aulicino, Joao M. Coimbra, Stephen P. Robinson, Vanessa Lapato, Brett Voss, James Moriana, Jeffrey Wilhoit, David Klotz
2012	Academy Award	Best Sound Editing	Nominated	Drive	Lon Bender, Victor Ray Ennis
2011	Academy Award	Best Sound Editing	Nominated	Unstoppable	Mark Stoeckinger
2010	Emmy Award	Outstanding Sound Editing for a Miniseries, Movie or a Special	Won	The Pacific, Part Five	Tom Bellfort, Benjamin Cook, Daniel S. Irwin, Hector Gika, Charles Maynes, Paul Aulicino, John C. Stuver, David Williams, Michelle Pazer, John Finklea, Jody Holwadel Thomas, Katie Rose
2010	Academy Award	Best Sound Editing	Nominated	Inglourious Basterds	Wylie Stateman
2010	Academy Award	Best Sound Editing	Nominated	Star Trek	Mark P. Stoeckinger, Alan Rankin
2010	BAFTA Award	Best Sound	Nominated	Star Trek	Mark P. Stoeckinger, Peter J. Devlin, Andy Nelson, Anna Behlmer, Ben Burtt
2009	Academy Award	Best Sound Editing	Nominated	Wanted	Wylie Stateman
2008	Academy Award	Best Sound Editing	Won	The Bourne Ultimatum	Karen M. Baker, Per Hallberg
2008	BAFTA Award	Best Sound	Won	The Bourne Ultimatum	Karen M. Baker, Per Hallberg, Kirk Francis, Scott Millan and David Parker
2007	Academy Award	Best Sound Editing	Nominated	Blood Diamond	Lon Bender
2006	Academy Award	Best Sound Editing	Nominated	Memoirs of a Geisha	Wylie Stateman
2005	BAFTA Award	Best Sound	Won	Ray	Karen M. Baker, Per Hallberg, Steve Cantamessa, Scott Millan, Greg Orloff, Bob Beemer
2005	Emmy Award	Outstanding Sound Editing for a Miniseries, Movie or a Special	Won	The Life and Death of Peter Sellers	Anna MacKenzie, Tim Hands, Geoffrey G. Rubay, James Mather, Victoria Brazier, Zack Davis, Laura Lovejoy, Richard Ford, Felicity Cottrell, and Ruth Sullivan
2004	BAFTA Award	Best Sound	Nominated	Kill Bill: Volume 1	Wylie Stateman, Michael Minkler, Myron Nettinga and Mark Ulano
2003	Emmy Award	Outstanding Sound Editing for a Miniseries, Movie or a Special	Nominated	Live from Baghdad	Glenn T. Morgan, Ben Wilkins, Jon Title, Greg Hedgepath, Lisle Engle, Jon Mete, Daniel S. Irwin, Larry Kemp, Michelle Pazer, Scott Sanders, Frederick H. Stahly, Kelly Oxford, James Bladon, Diane Marshall and Michael J. Broomberg
2003	Academy Award	Best Sound Editing	Nominated	Road to Perdition	Scott Hecker
2002	BAFTA Award	Best Sound	Nominated	Black Hawk Down	Karen M. Baker, Chris Munro, Per Hallberg, Michael Minkler, Myron Nettinga
2002	BAFTA Award	Best Sound	Nominated	Shrek	Lon Bender, Andy Nelson, Anna Behlmer, Wylie Stateman
2001	BAFTA Award	Best Sound	Won	Almost Famous	Michael D. Wilhoit, Jeff Wexler, Doug Hemphill, Rick Kline, Paul Massey
2001	BAFTA Award	Best Sound	Nominated	Gladiator	Ken Weston, Scott Millan, Bob Beemer
2001	BAFTA Award	Best Sound	Nominated	The Perfect Storm	Wylie Stateman, Keith A. Wester, John T. Reitz, Gregg Rudloff, David E. Campbell, Kelly Cabral
2000	BAFTA Award	Best Sound	Nominated	American Beauty	Scott Martin Gershin, Scott Millan, Bob Beemer, Richard Van Dyke
2000	Emmy Award	Outstanding Sound Editing for a Series	Nominated	The Others: Eyes	Harry Cohen, Mace Matiosian, Ruth Adelman, Guy Tsujimoto, Jivan Tahmizian, Diane Griffen, Zane D. Bruce and Michael J. Broomberg
2000	Emmy Award	Outstanding Sound Editing	Nominated	The Devil’s Arithmetic	Anna MacKenzie, William H. Angarola, Mike Marchain, Robert Guastini, Cindy Rabideau, Ray Spiess, Rick Hinson and Warren Smith
1999	Academy Award	Best Sound Effects Editing	Nominated	The Mask of Zorro	Dave McMoyler
1999	Emmy Award	Outstanding Sound Editing for a Series	Nominated	Buffy the Vampire Slayer: Lover's Walk	Anna MacKenzie, Cindy Rabideau, Robert Guastini, Mark Cleary, Mike Marchain, William H. Angarola, Rick Hinson, Ray Spiess, Fernand Bos, Zane D. Bruce and Joseph T. Sabella
1999	Emmy Award	Outstanding Sound Editing for a Series	Nominated	The Sopranos: I Dream Of Jeannie Cusamano	Anna MacKenzie, Ray Spiess, William H. Angarola, Robert Guastini, Benjamin Beardwood, Mike Marchain, Rick Hinson, Bruce Swanson, Mark Cleary, Cindy Rabideau, Kathryn Dayak, Zane D. Bruce and Joseph T. Sabella
1999	Emmy Award	Outstanding Sound Editing for a Miniseries or a Special	Nominated	A Soldier's Sweetheart	Anna MacKenzie, William H. Angarola, Rick Hinson, Raymond E. Spiess III, Cindy Rabideau, Mike Marchain, Jason Lezama, Robert Guastini, Ray Spiess, Ron Finn, Christopher Moriana and Katie Rowe
1999	Emmy Award	Outstanding Sound Editing for a Miniseries or a Special	Nominated	Houdini	Anna MacKenzie, William H. Angarola, Rick Hinson, Ray Spiess, Mike Marchain, Skip Adams, Robert Guastini, Cindy Rabideau, Jeanette Surga, Zane D. Bruce and Joseph T. Sabella
1998	Academy Award	Best Sound Effects Editing	Nominated	Face/Off	Mark P. Stoeckinger, Per Hallberg
1998	Emmy Award	Outstanding Sound Editing for a Series	Nominated	The Visitor: Pilot	Anna MacKenzie, Cindy Rabideau, Mark Cleary, Rick Hinson, Raymond E. Spiess III, Ray Spiess, Robert Guastini, William H. Angarola, Jay B. Richardson, James Moriana and Michael J. Broomberg
1998	Emmy Award	Outstanding Sound Editing for a Miniseries, Movie or a Special	Nominated	Creature	Anna MacKenzie, William H. Angarola, Ray Spiess, Rick Hinson, Cindy Rabideau, Robert Guastini, Mark Cleary, Jason Lezama, Mike Marchain, Raymond E. Spiess III, Steve Bissinger, Aaron Martin, Ellen Heuer and Craig Ng
1996	Academy Award	Best Sound Effects Editing	Won	Braveheart	Lon Bender, Per Hallberg
1996	BAFTA Award	Best Sound	Won	Braveheart	Lon Bender, Per Hallberg, Brian Simmons, Andy Nelson, Scott Millan and Anna Behlmer
1994	Academy Award	Best Sound Effects Editing	Nominated	Cliffhanger	Wylie Stateman and Gregg Baxter
1993	BAFTA Award	Best Sound	Won	JFK	Wylie Stateman, Tod A. Maitland, Michael D. Wilhoit, Michael Minkler and Gregg Landaker
1993	BAFTA Award	Best Sound	Nominated	The Last of the Mohicans	Lon Bender, Simon Kaye, Larry Kemp, Paul Massey, Doug Hemphill, Mark Smith and Chris Jenkins
1991	Emmy Award	Outstanding Sound Editing for a Miniseries or a Special	Won	Son of the Morning Star	Dave McMoyler, G. Michael Graham, Joseph Melody, Richard S. Steele, Mark Steele, Gary Macheel, Charles R. Beith Jr., Mark Friedgen, Dan Luna, Michael J. Wright, Bob Costanza, Christopher Assells, Bill Bell, Scott A. Tinsley, Phil Jamtaas, Andre Caporaso, Stephen Grubbs, Kristi Johns, and John Caper Jr.
1990	Academy Award	Best Sound	Nominated	Born on the Fourth of July	Wylie Stateman, Michael Minkler, Gregory H. Watkins and Tod A. Maitland
1989	Emmy Award	Outstanding Sound Editing for a Miniseries or a Special	Won	Lonesome Dove: The Plains	Dave McMoyler, Joseph Melody, Mark Steele, Richard S. Steele, Michael J. Wright, Gary Macheel, Stephen Grubbs, Mark Friedgen, Charles R. Beith Jr., Scott A. Tinsley, Karla Caldwell, George B. Bell, G. Michael Graham, Kristi Johns, Tom Villano and Jamie Forester
1989	Emmy Award	Outstanding Sound Editing for a Miniseries or a Special	Nominated	Steal the Sky	Dave McMoyler, Joseph Melody, Mark Friedgen, G. Michael Graham, Gary Macheel, A. David Marshall, Diane Marshall, Mark Steele, Rusty Tinsley, Scott A. Tinsley, Charles R. Beith Jr., Christopher Assells, Kristi Johns and Allan K. Rosen
1988	Emmy Award	Outstanding Sound Editing for a Miniseries or a Special	Nominated	Earth Star Voyager	Dave McMoyler, Joseph Melody, Rusty Beith, Dino Dimuro, Golden Felton, Mark Friedgen, G. Michael Graham, Lenny Jennings, A. David Marshall, Greg Schorer, Scott A. Tinsley, Michael C. Gutierrez, John Mick, Mark Steele and Gary Macheel
1988	Emmy Award	Outstanding Sound Editing for a Series	Nominated	Beauty and the Beast: No Way Down	Scott Marin Gershin, Anthony Mazzei, Robert Mackston, Steve Dutkovich, Dave Weathers, David Hankins and Don Sanders
1986	Emmy Award	Outstanding Sound Editing for a Series	Nominated	Airwolf: Eagles	Michael D. Wilhoit, Gene Corso, Michael H. Ford, Hector C. Gika, Donlee Jorgensen, Asher Yates, Ernesto Mas and Gene L. Gillette
1986	Emmy Award	Outstanding Sound Editing for a Series	Nominated	Misfits of Science: Deep Freeze	Michael D. Wilhoit, Kyle Wright, Bruce Bell, Barney Cabral, Phil Haberman, Mark Hollingsworth, Donlee Jorgensen, Jimmy Ling, Bernard F. Pincus, Vern Shaw, Bruce Stambler, Richard Marx and Laurie Higgins Tobias
1985	Emmy Award	Outstanding Film Sound Editing for a Limited Series or a Special	Nominated	Space	Lon Bender, Wylie Stateman, Terry Lynn Allen, David Bartlett, Jill Demby, John Duffy, Cameron Frankley, Avram D. Gold, Randy Kelley, Elliot Koretz, Bobbe Kurtz, Cliff Latimer, Mark P. Stoeckinger, Joseph A. Mayer, Stan Gilbert and Stephen M. Rowe
1985	Emmy Award	Outstanding Sound Editing for a Series	Won	Miami Vice: Brother's Keeper	Michael D. Wilhoit, Charles E. Moran, Bruce Bell, Victor B. Lackey, Ian MacGregor-Scott, Carl Mahakian, John Oettinger, Bernard F. Pincus, Warren Smith, Bruce Stambler, Kyle Wright, Paul Wittenberg and Jerry Cohen
1985	Emmy Award	Outstanding Film Sound Editing for a Series	Nominated	Airwolf: Firestorm	Michael D. Wilhoit, Gene Corso, Donlee Jorgensen, Gary Mundheim, Bob Newlan, Asher Yates, Barney Cabral and Gene L. Gillette
1984	Emmy Award	Outstanding Film Sound Editing for a Series	Won	Airwolf	Michael D. Wilhoit, Sam F. Shaw, Michael H. Ford, Donlee Jorgensen, Mark Roberts, Breck Warwick, Bob Weatherford, Nicholas Vincent Korda, Gene L. Gillette
