= Todd Soundelux =

American entertainment production company

- Industry: Post-production, broadcast media
- Founded: 2008
- Headquarters: Hollywood, California, United States

Todd Soundelux is an American creative entertainment services company.

The company's main activity is to provide creative and technical post production sound and music services for motion picture studios, independent producers, broadcast networks, cable channels, advertising agencies and other companies that produce, own or distribute content. The company maintains three facilities in California in Hollywood, Burbank, and Santa Monica.

== History ==
- 2008: Ascent Media Group's Creative Sound Services group spun off from Discovery Holding Company to create CSS Studios, LLC, a wholly owned subsidiary of Discovery Communications. This included the assets of Todd-AO, Soundelux, Sound One, POP Sound, Modern Music, Soundelux Design Music Group and The Hollywood Edge.
- 2012: On September 19, Empire Investment Holdings announced it had acquired CSS Studios, LLC from Discovery Communications, Inc.
- 2013: In January 2013, CSS Studios announced it would rename the company as Todd-Soundelux.
- 2014: In May 2014, Todd Soundelux filed for Chapter 11 bankruptcy protection, and was seeking to reorganize. As part of the bankruptcy proceedings, they closed their Hollywood and Santa Monica facilities, leaving only their Burbank location operational.

== Related companies ==
=== Subsidiaries ===
- Todd-AO
  - Burbank, California
  - Hollywood, California
  - Santa Monica, California
- Soundelux
  - Hollywood, California
- Hollywood Edge
  - Hollywood, California

== Notable creative staff ==
=== Feature films ===
- Bill Abbott - music editor - Oz the Great and Powerful;Brave; Men In Black 3; Spider-Man 2; Alice in Wonderland
- Tom Bellfort - Supervising Sound Editor - Source Code; The Pacific; Titanic; Mission: Impossible; Star Wars Episode I: The Phantom Menace
- Lon Bender - Supervising Sound Editor - 2 Guns; The Hunger Games; Drive; Defiance; The Blood Diamond
- Kelly Cabral - Supervising Sound Editor - The Purge; Dark Skies; Kill the Irishman; The Perfect Storm
- Patrick Cyccone - Re-recording mixer - The Descendants; Day Watch; Halloween 2; Mean Girls
- Andrew DeCristofaro - Supervising Sound Editor - Iron Man 3; The Heat; A Nightmare on Elm Street; Little Miss Sunshine
- Marshall Garlington - Re-recording mixer - CBGB; The Perks of Being a Wallflower; Jackass Presents: Bad Grandpa
- Gary Hecker - Foley Artist - Man of Steel; Pacific Rim; Django Unchained; Robin Hood; The Hunger Games; Nightmare on Elm Street
- Adam Jenkins - Re-recording mixer - Law Abiding Citizen; Forgetting Sarah Marshall; Thank You For Smoking; Crash
- Kenneth Karman - supervising music editor - Flight; The A-Team; A Christmas Carol; G.I. Joe: The Rise of Cobra; Beowulf
- Tony Lamberti - Re-recording mixer - Django Unchained; The Twilight Saga: Breaking Dawn - Part 1 & 2; RED; Inglourious Basterds
- Daniel J. Leahy - Re-recording mixer - Olympus Has Fallen; Alex Cross; Kiss Kiss Bang Bang; The Fast and the Furious
- Dave McMoyler - Supervising Sound Editor - Final Destination 5; RED; Snakes on a Plane; Flightplan; Wedding Crashers
- Christian P. Minkler - Re-recording mixer - Riddick; The Heat; End of Watch; Babel
- Michael Minkler - Re-recording mixer - Django Unchained; Inglourious Basterds; Chicago; Dreamgirls; Black Hawk Down
- Kevin O′Connell - Re-recording mixer - Muppets Most Wanted; Transformers; Apocalypto; Spider-Man 2; Memoirs of a Geisha
- Mark Paterson - Re-recording mixer - The World′s End; Les Misérables; Attack the Block; Children of Men
- Wylie Stateman - Supervising Sound Editor - Django Unchained; Robin Hood; Inglourious Basterds; Memoirs of a Geisha; Kill Bill; Natural Born Killers; JFK
- Michael Wilhoit - Supervising Sound Editor - Jackass Presents: Bad Grandpa; Furry Vengeance; Hurricane Season; Madea Goes to Jail; Almost Famous

=== Television ===
- Onnalee Blank - Re-recording mixer - Game of Thrones
- Jim Fitzpatrick - Re-recording mixer - Family Guy; American Dad; The Cleveland Show; Melrose Place
- Dennis Kirk - Re-recording mixer - The Newsroom; Big Love; Entourage; Supernatural; Prison Break
- Mace Matiosian Supervising Sound Editor - CSI: Crime Scene Investigation; Star Trek: Deep Space Nine; Star Trek: The Next Generation
- Todd Orr - Re-recording mixer - Big Love; The Sopranos; Band of Brothers: Flipper
- Yuri Reese - Re-recording mixer - CSI: Crime Scene Investigation; CSI: Miami; Without a Trace
- Keith Rogers - Re-recording mixer - Perception; Person of Interest; Bones
- Alec St. John - Re-recording mixer - Mad Men; The Glades; Body of Proof; Entourage
- Greg Schorer - Supervising Sound Editor - NCIS: Naval Criminal Investigative Service; JAG;
- William Smith - Re-recording mixer - CSI: Crime Scene Investigation; CSI: Miami; Without a Trace
- Ken Teaney - Re-recording mixer - Mad Men; Saving Grace; Dollhouse;
- Scott Weber - Re-recording mixer - Person of Interest; TRON: Uprising; Alacatraz; Lost

== Notable industry recognition ==
Year	Award	Category	Type	Title	Honorees
2014	Academy Award	Best Sound Editing	Nominated	Lone Survivor	Wylie Stateman
2014	Academy Award	Best Sound Mixing	Nominated	Lone Survivor	Andy Koyama, Beau Borders, David Brownlow
2014	CAS Award	Sound Mixing - Motion Picture - Live Action	Nominated	Lone Survivor	Andy Koyama, Beau Borders, David Brownlow, Satoshi Mark Noguchi, Gregory Steele, Nerses Gezalyan
2014	CAS Award	Sound Mixing - Television Series	Nominated	Game Of Thrones, The Rains of Castamere	Onnalee Blank, Mathew Waters, Ronan Hill, Brett Voss
2014	CAS Award	Sound Mixing - TV Non-Fiction, Variety, Music Series or Specials	Nominated	2013 Rock and Roll Hall of Fame Induction Ceremony	Michael Minkler, Greg Townsend
2013	Emmy Award	Sound Mixing - Comedy Or Drama Series	Nominated	Game Of Thrones, And Now His Watch Is Ended	Mathew Waters, Onnalee Blank, Ronan Hill
2013	Emmy Award	Sound Editing - Series	Nominated	Game Of Thrones, And Now His Watch Is Ended	Tim Kimmel, Paula Fairfield, Jed M. Dodge, Bradley C. Katona, David Klotz, Brett Voss, Jeffrey Wilhoit, James Moriana
2013	Emmy Award	Sound Mixing - Comedy Or Drama Series	Nominated	Mad Men, The Flood	Ken Teaney, Alec St. John, Peter Bentley
2013	Emmy Award	Sound Editing - Series	Nominated	Nikita, Aftermath	George Haddad, Ruth Adelman, Chad J. Hughes, Steve Papagiannis, Dale Chaloukian, Ashley Revell, James M. Bailey
2013	Emmy Award	Sound Editing - Miniseries, Movie or Special	Nominated	Seal Team Six: The Raid on Osama Bin Laden	Christopher Kaller, Trip Brock, Peter D. Lago, Steven Avila, Alexander Pugh, Kate Sheil, Greg Mauer, Rick Owens
2013	Academy Award	Best Sound Editing	Won	Skyfall	Per Hallberg, Karen Baker Landers
2013	Academy Award	Best Sound Editing	Nominated	Django Unchained	Wylie Stateman
2013	BAFTA Award	Best Sound	Nominated	Skyfall	Per Hallberg, Karen Baker Landers, Scott Millan, Gregg Russell, Stuart Wilson
2013	BAFTA Award	Best Sound	Nominated	Django Unchained	Wylie Stateman, Michael Minkler, Tony Lamberti, Mark Ulano
2013	CAS Award	Sound Mixing - Television Series	Nominated	Game Of Thrones, Blackwater	Onnalee Blank, Mathew Waters, Ronan Hill, Brett Voss
2013	CAS Award	Sound Mixing - Television Series	Nominated	Mad Men, Commissions and Fees	Ken Teaney, Alec St. John, Peter Bentley
2012	Emmy Award	Sound Editing - Series	Nominated	CSI: Miami, Blown Away	Timothy I. Kimmel, Brad Katona, Ruth Adelman, Todd Niesen, Skye Lewin, Joseph Sabella, James Bailey
2012	Emmy Award	Sound Editing - Series	Won	Game Of Thrones, Blackwater	Peter Brown, Kira Roessler, Tim Hands, Paul Aulicino, Stephen P. Robinson, Vanessa Lapato, Brett Voss, James Moriana, Jeffrey Wilhoit, David Klotz
2012	Emmy Award	Sound Mixing - Comedy Or Drama Series	Won	Game Of Thrones, Blackwater	Matthew Waters, Onnalee Blank, Ronan Hill, Mervyn Moore
2012	Emmy Award	Sound Mixing - Comedy Or Drama Series	Nominated	Entourage, The End	Tom Stasinis, Dennis Kirk, Todd Orr
2012	Academy Award	Best Sound Editing	Nominated	Drive	Lon Bender, Victor Ray Ennis
2011	Emmy Award	Sound Mixing – Comedy or Drama	Won	Family Guy: Road to the North Pole	James F. Fitzpatrick, Patrick Clark
2011	Emmy Award	Sound Mixing	Nominated	Mildred Pierce (Part Five)	Drew Kunin, Leslie Shatz, Bobby Johanson, Joshua Reinhardt
2011	Emmy Award	Sound Mixing – Comedy or Drama	Nominated	Mad Men, The Suitcase	Ken Teaney, Todd Orr, Peter Bentley
2011	Emmy Award	Sound Editing – Series	Nominated	Nikita, Pandora	George Haddad, Dale Chaloukian, Ruth Adelman, Chad J. Hughes, Ashley Revell, James Bailey, Joseph T. Sabella
2011	Emmy Award	Sound Editing – Series	Nominated	CSI: NY, Life Sentence	Mark Relyea, Edmund Lachmann, David Barbee, Ruth Adelman, Kevin McCullough, Joshua Winget, Joseph T. Sabella, James M. Bailey
2011	Academy Award	Best Sound Editing	Nominated	Unstoppable	Mark Stoeckinger
2011	BAFTA Award	Best Sound	Nominated	Black Swan	Dominick Tavella, Craig Henighan, Ken Ishii
2010	Emmy Award	Sound Editing - Miniseries or Movie	Won	The Pacific, Part Five	Tom Bellfort, Benjamin Cook, Daniel S. Irwin, Hector Gika, Charles Maynes, Paul Aulicino, John C. Stuver, David Williams, Michelle Pazer, John Finklea, Jody Holwadel Thomas, Katie Rose
2010	Emmy Award	Sound Mixing – Miniseries or Movie	Won	The Pacific, Part Two	Michael Minkler, Daniel Leahy, Andrew Ramage
2010	Emmy Award	Sound Mixing – Miniseries or Movie	Nominated	The Pacific, Part Five	Michael Minkler, Daniel Leahy, Craig Mann, Andrew Ramage
2010	Emmy Award	Sound Mixing – Miniseries or Movie	Nominated	The Pacific, Part Eight	Michael Minkler, Daniel Leahy, Marc Fishman, Gary Wilkins
2010	Emmy Award	Sound Mixing – Miniseries or Movie	Nominated	The Pacific, Part Nine	Michael Minkler, Daniel Leahy, Gary Wilkins
2010	Emmy Award	Sound Mixing - Comedy or Drama Series	Won	Entourage, Part Eight	Dennis Kirk, Alec St. John, Todd Orr, Tom Stasinis
2010	Emmy Award	Sound Mixing - Nonfiction Programming	Nominated	The National Parks: America's Best Idea	Dominick Tavella
2010	BAFTA Award	Best Sound	Nominated	Star Trek	Mark P. Stoeckinger, Peter J. Devlin, Andy Nelson, Anna Behlmer, Ben Burtt
2010	Academy Award	Best Sound Editing	Nominated	Star Trek	Mark P. Stoeckinger, Alan Rankin
2010	CAS Award	Sound Mixing - Television Series	Won	Mad Men, Guy Walks Into an Advertising Agency	Ken Teaney, Todd Orr, Peter Bentley
2009	Academy Award	Best Sound Editing	Nominated	Inglourious Basterds	Wylie Stateman
2009	Academy Award	Best Sound Mixing	Nominated	Inglourious Basterds	Michael Minkler and Tony Lamberti
2009	BAFTA Award	Best Sound	Nominated	Quantum of Solace	Eddy Joseph
2009	Emmy Award	Sound Mixing - Comedy or Drama	Won	Entourage	Dennis Kirk, Bill Jackson, Tom Stasinis
2009	Emmy Award	Sound Editing - Series	Nominated	CSI: Crime Scene Investigation	Mace Matiosian, Ruth Adelman, Jivan Tahmizian, David Van Slyke, Joseph Sabella, James Bailey.
2009	Academy Award	Best Sound Editing	Nominated	Wanted	Wylie Stateman
2008	Emmy Award	Sound Editing, Miniseries or Movie	Won	John Adams	Alex Gibson
2008	Emmy Award	Sound Mixing, Miniseries or Movie	Won	John Adams	Marc Fishman and Tony Lamberti
2008	Emmy Award	Sound Mixing, Miniseries or Movie	Nominated	John Adams	Michael Minkler and Bob Beemer
2008	Emmy Award	Sound Editing - Series	Nominated	CSI: Crime Scene Investigation	Mace Matiosian, Ruth Adelman, Jivan Tahmizian, David Van Slyke, Chad Hughes, Joseph Sabella, Zane Bruce.
2008	Emmy Award	Sound Mixing, Nonfiction	Nominated	The War	Dominick Tavella
2008	Emmy Award	Sound Mixing - Comedy or Drama	Nominated	Entourage	Dennis Kirk and Bill Jackson
2008	Academy Award	Best Sound Mixing	Won	The Bourne Ultimatum	Scott Millan and David Parker
2008	Academy Award	Best Sound Editing	Won	The Bourne Ultimatum	Karen M. Baker, Per Hallberg
2008	BAFTA Award	Best Sound	Won	The Bourne Ultimatum	Karen M. Baker, Per Hallberg, Kirk Francis, Scott Millan, David Parker
