= Todd-AO =

American post-production company

- Industry: Post-production, broadcast media, motion pictures, television
- Founded: 1953
- Headquarters: Hollywood, California, U.S.
- Owner: Todd Soundelux
- Website: toddao.com

Todd-AO is an American post-production company founded in 1953 by Mike Todd and Robert Naify, providing sound-related services to the motion picture and television industries. The company retains one facility, in the Los Angeles area.

Todd-AO is also the name of the widescreen, 70 mm film distribution format that was developed by Mike Todd and the Naify brothers, owners of United Artists Theaters in partnership with the American Optical Company in the mid-1950s. Todd-AO had been founded to promote and distribute this system.

== History ==
Todd-AO began as a high resolution widescreen film format. It was co-developed in the early 1950s by Mike Todd, a Broadway producer, and United Artists Theaters in partnership with the American Optical Company in Buffalo, New York. It was developed to provide a high definition single camera widescreen process to compete with Cinerama, or as characterized by its creator, "Cinerama outta one hole." Where Cinerama used a complicated setup of three separate strips of film photographed simultaneously, Todd-AO required only a single camera and lens.

The company's focus began to shift after Mike Todd's sudden death in an airplane accident in 1958. The 70 mm Todd-AO process was adopted by Panavision, Cinerama and others. As the production and exhibition markets became saturated with Todd-AO System hardware, the focus of the company gradually began to narrow to the audio post-production side of the business, and Todd-AO became an independent sound mixing facility for commercial motion picture films and television after acquiring Glen Glenn Sound in 1986.

In 1999 Todd-AO was acquired by Liberty Media Group, a division of AT&T, for $92.5 million and became part of its Liberty Livewire entity in 2000, together with other large post-production companies, Four Media Co. and Soundelux. In 2002, Liberty Livewire was renamed Ascent Media Group, which was spun-off in 2005 into Discovery Holding Company.

In May 2014, Todd-AO's parent company, Todd Soundelux, filed for Chapter 11 bankruptcy protection. As part of the bankruptcy proceedings, the company closed its Hollywood and Santa Monica facilities, leaving only their Burbank location operational.

On November 17, 2014, Sounddogs acquired the Todd-Soundelux trademarks (Todd AO and Soundelux) and copyrights (Sound Effects Library) through federal bankruptcy court (Central District Case No. 2:14-bk-19980).

=== Todd-AO process ===
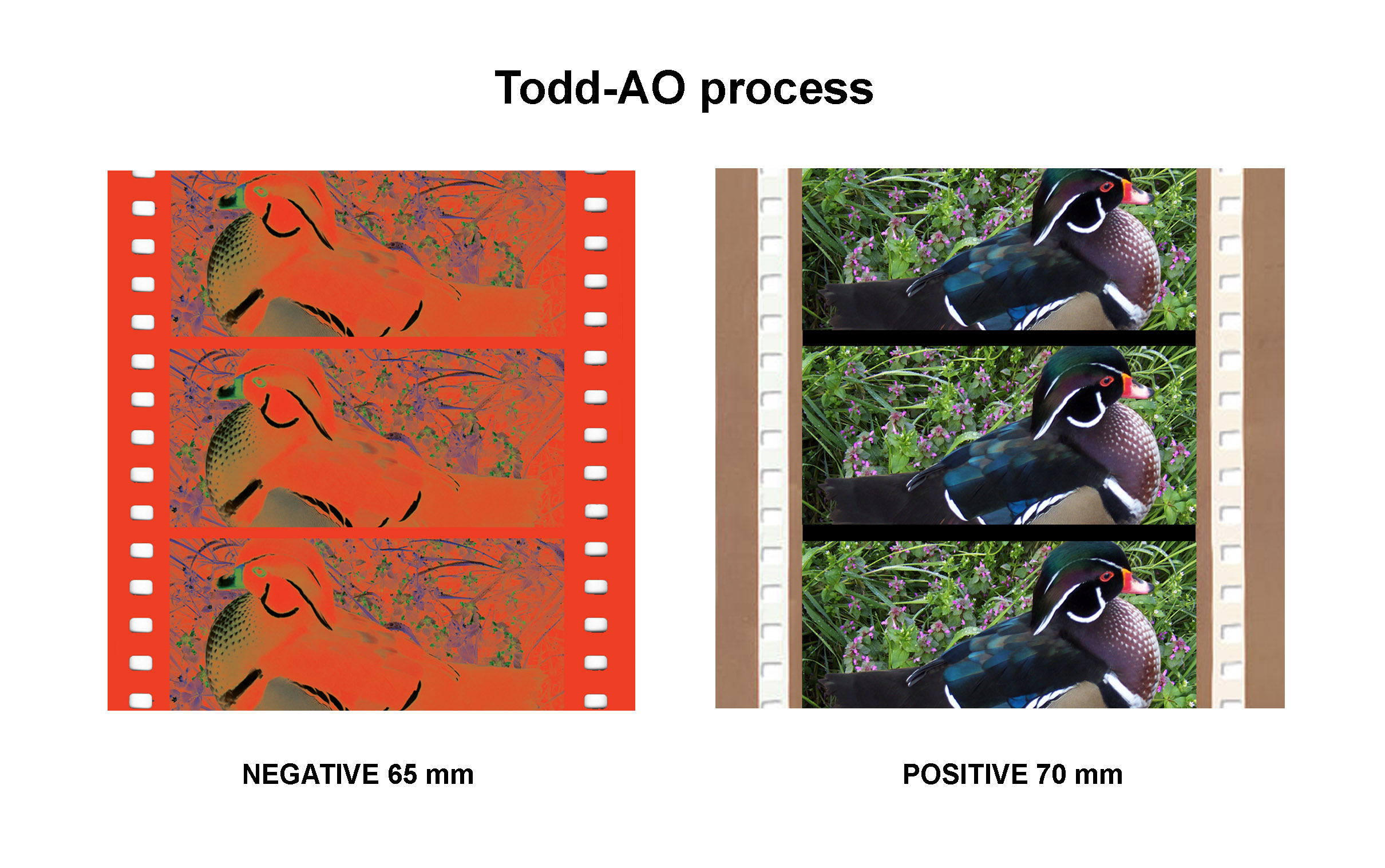
Figure 1. Todd-AO: 65 mm negative and 70 mm positive

The Todd-AO process uses two separate film stocks; a 65 mm negative is used during production and then used to produce the 70 mm positives for distribution. The sprocket hole perforations on the two are the same, and the positives are printed using contact printing with the negatives centered on the larger 70 mm film. Contact printing was used on prints that were to be "double system", using a separate, synchronized 35 mm full-coat magnetic film for the 6 sound tracks, in addition to the 70 mm film for the picture. The much more common 70 mm release prints used a slightly optically reduced picture [cite references], and placed four of the soundtracks on either edge outside of the perforations, and two more soundtracks inside the perforations, providing a total of six soundtracks, on a 7.5 mm magnetic surface. Todd-AO soundtracks were very high fidelity, and could still compete with modern digital tracks above 40 kHz. Speaker layout was Left, Left-center, Center, Right-center, Right, and mono Surround. Even though there were no subwoofers in theaters in those days, Todd-AO delivered high-impact bass using crisp-sounding horn-loaded speakers. Four lens options covered a 128, 64, 48 or 37 degree field of view. The aspect ratio of this format was 2.20:1.

Todd-AO (5-perf) 65 mm negative frame dimensions

Both film sizes had been used in the past, in the 70 mm Fox Grandeur process in 1929–1930, but Todd-AO's physical format was not compatible with this format. The use of 65 mm photography and 70 mm printing became the standard adopted by others: Super Panavision 70 (essentially the Panavision company's version of Todd-AO) and Ultra Panavision 70 (the same mechanically, but with a slight 1.25:1 anamorphic squeeze to accommodate extremely wide aspect ratio images) are both 65/70 processes. The Soviet film industry also copied Todd-AO with their own Sovscope 70 process, identical, except that both the camera and print stock were 70 mm wide.

The IMAX format also uses 65 mm camera and lab film to create 70 mm prints for projection (also known as the 65/70 mm process); conforming to the pitch and perforation standard for 70 mm Todd-AO film. However, the IMAX frame is 15 perfs wide and runs horizontally through the projector, whereas the Todd-AO frame is only 5 perfs high and runs vertically through the projector.

The original version of the Todd-AO process used a frame rate of 30 frames per second, faster than the 24 frames per second that was (and is) the standard. The difference does not seem great, but the sensitivity of the human eye to flickering declines steeply with frame rate and the small adjustment gave the film noticeably less flicker, and made it steadier and smoother than standard processes. The original system generated an image that was "almost twice as intense as any ever seen onscreen before, and so hot that the film has to be cooled as it passes through the Todd-AO projector".

Only the first two Todd-AO films, Oklahoma! and Around the World in Eighty Days, employed 30 frames per second photography. Because of the need for conventional versions at 24 frames per second, every scene of the former film was shot twice in succession: once in Todd-AO and once in 35 mm CinemaScope. The latter film was shot with two 65 mm Todd-AO cameras simultaneously, the speed of the second camera was 24 frames per second for wide release as optical reduction prints. All subsequent Todd-AO films were shot at 24 frames per second on a 65 mm negative and optically printed to 35 mm film as needed for standard distribution. In all, around 16 feature films were shot in Todd-AO.

Todd-AO was developed and tested in Buffalo, New York, at the Regent Theatre. Richard Rodgers and Oscar Hammerstein II went there to see Todd-AO test footage, which led them to approve its use for Oklahoma!. Ampex Corporation engineers were in charge of developing the Todd-AO sound system. Ampex would later go on to manufacture the sound system, including selectable four-track composite (CinemaScope), six-track composite (Todd-AO), four-track interlocked, six-track interlocked or optical sound sources.

The Todd-AO Company also offered a 35 mm anamorphic process technically similar to 35 mm Panavision or CinemaScope. This may cause some confusion if a Todd-AO credit (not necessarily the more specific Todd-AO 35 credit) appears in some widescreen films made in the 1970s and 1980s. It becomes even more confusing as 70 mm prints were made for films which, unlike earlier pictures made in the process, were shown in multiplexes, like Dune and Logan's Run.

During the late 1970s through the early 1990s, 65 mm photography such as that used in processes like Todd-AO or Super Panavision became rare. However, some major films had 70 mm prints made by blowup from 35 mm negatives mostly for the benefit of six-track sound. These prints would typically play only in a few theatres in a few large cities while everyone else viewed the film in 35 mm. The advent of multichannel digital sound in the 1990s obviated these very expensive prints. "Blow-up" 70 mm prints also followed the Todd-AO layout, although in the case of films made with a 1.85:1 aspect ratio, it was retained in the 70 mm version, with the sides of the 70 mm frame left black.

=== Curved screen vs. flat ===
While Todd-AO was intended to be "Cinerama out of one hole", the extreme wide-angle photography and projection onto a very deeply curved screen (which is what that would imply) saw little use. Most Todd-AO theatre installations had only moderately curved screens and the extreme wide-angle camera lenses were used only on a few shots here and there. Todd-AO films made after 1958 used a conventional flat widescreen, and resembled ordinary films, except for their greater clarity and six-track stereo sound. A variation on Todd-AO called Dimension 150 did, however, make use of Cinerama-like deeply curved screens. Only two films were made in Dimension 150 – The Bible: In the Beginning..., directed by John Huston, and Patton, starring George C. Scott. In some venues, however, Todd-AO and Dimension 150 films received their first run in Cinerama theatres in order that they be shown on a deeply curved screen – such as the first Atlanta showings of The Sound of Music.

=== Todd-AO and roadshows ===
Todd-AO films were closely associated with what was called roadshow exhibition. At the time, before multiplex theatres became common, most films opened at a large single screen theatre in the downtown area of each large city before eventually moving on to neighborhood theatres. With the roadshow concept, a film would play, often in 70 mm at a movie palace downtown theatre exclusively, sometimes for a year or more. Often a "hard ticket" policy was in effect, with tickets sold for specific numbered seats, and limited showings per day. Most Todd-AO films through the late 1960s, including Those Magnificent Men in Their Flying Machines and The Sound of Music, were initially shown on a roadshow basis.

In some US cities, individual theaters were converted for use in the 1950s as dedicated Todd-AO "Cinestage" showplaces. These theaters showed exclusive roadshow engagements of Todd-AO and other 70 mm films on large, deeply curved screens. They included the Rivoli Theatre in New York City, the Cinestage Theatre in Chicago and Hunt's Cinestage Theatre in Columbus, Ohio.

The roadshow era ended in the early 1970s, although a very few films (among them Gandhi) were shown in roadshow format after that.

=== Todd-AO 35 ===
In the 1970s, under the leadership of Dr. Richard Vetter, Todd-AO made an attempt to compete with Panavision in the 35 mm motion picture camera rental market. The company built a series of anamorphic lenses in the 2.35:1 scope format, and owned several camera bodies (Mitchell and Arriflex) that they would provide with the lens package. Films produced in Todd-AO 35 include Conquest of the Planet of the Apes, Conan the Barbarian, Mad Max, Dune and Logan's Run.

By the mid 1980s the venture was moribund, and was finally abandoned in 1992. Eventually all of the Todd-AO cameras and lenses, both 35 mm and 65 mm (70 mm), were sold to Cinema Products in Los Angeles. The 35mm anamorphic lenses are now in the rental inventory of Keslow Camera.

== Timeline ==
- 1953: Mike Todd, the Naify brothers and the American Optical Company form a joint venture called Todd-AO for the purpose of developing and distributing a large film format presentation system which incorporates a wide, curved screen with multi-channel sound.
- 1955 and 1956: Mike Todd produced two films which feature the new Todd-AO system.
- 1958: Mike Todd is killed in a plane crash.
- 1960s and 1970s: Although several blockbuster films were produced using the Todd-AO or Panavision versions of the 5-perf 70 mm format, market penetration of the Todd-AO system lost momentum, and is overtaken by the development of IMAX in the 1970s.
- 1986: Acquired Glen Glenn Sound.
- 1987: Acquired the Trans/Audio sound studio in New York City
- 1994: Acquired Film-Video Masters, Inc.
- 1995: Acquired Skywalker Sound South studios from George Lucas in Santa Monica
- 1995: Purchased Chrysalis Television Facilities and its satellite transmission from the Chrysalis Group
- 1996: Acquired Pacific Title and Art which brought specialization in the production of film, title, and optical special effects as well as digital services for motion pictures
- 1996: Acquired Editworks, which specialized in commercial advertising in Atlanta, expanded Todd-AO’s geographic connections
- 1997: Acquired International Video Conversions in Burbank
- 1997: Purchased Hollywood Digital Company
- 1998: Acquired Pascal Video to address the potential market in Digital Versatile Disk (DVD) technology. Todd-AO Video Services DVD, Inc. was created for the conversion of film and video content to DVD format
- 1999: Acquired SoundOne Corporation in New York City
- 1999: Purchased 50% of 103 Estudio in Barcelona
- 1999: Todd-AO acquired by Liberty Media Group, a division of AT&T, and became part of its Liberty Livewire entity.
- 2002: Liberty Livewire renamed Ascent Media Group.
- 2005: Ascent Media Group spun-off from owner, Liberty Media, into Discovery Holding Company.
- 2007: Discovery Holding Company announced a restructuring plan where it intended to spin off its interest in Ascent Media and combine Discovery Communications with Advance/Newhouse Communications into a new holding company. The reorganization was completed on September 17, 2008.
- 2007: The Todd-AO Scoring Stage closed.
- 2008: "Creative Sound Services" division of Ascent Media Group was spun-off from Discovery Holding Company to create CSS Studios, LLC, to become a wholly owned subsidiary of Discovery Communications. This transaction included the assets of Todd-AO, Soundelux, Sound One, POP Sound, Modern Music, Soundelux Design Music Group and The Hollywood Edge.
- 2012: CSS Studios, LLC is acquired by Empire InvestmentHoldings, which files bankruptcy for Todd Soundelux in May 2014.
- 2014: (May) Todd Soundelux files for bankruptcy, closing its Hollywood and Santa Monica facilities.
- 2014: (November) Sounddogs acquires the Todd-Soundelux Trademarks (Todd AO and Soundelux) and Copyrights (Sound Effects Library)

== Films produced in 70 mm Todd-AO ==
(films photographed in Todd-AO 35 not included)

- Oklahoma! (1955) – 30 frame/s (also photographed in CinemaScope for conventional distribution)
- Around the World in Eighty Days (1956) – 30 frame/s (also photographed in Todd-AO 24 frames/s and reduction-printed for conventional CinemaScope distribution)
- The Miracle of Todd-AO (1956) – 30 frame/s; short subject
- South Pacific (1958) – this and all subsequent were 24 frame/s
- The March of Todd-AO (1958) – short subject
- Porgy and Bess (1959)
- Can-Can (1960)
- The Alamo (1960)
- Scent of Mystery (1960) – credited as Todd 70
- Cleopatra (1963)
- Man in the 5th Dimension (1964) – NYC World's Fair short subject
- The Sound of Music (1965)
- Those Magnificent Men in Their Flying Machines (1965)
- The Agony and the Ecstasy (1965)
- The Bible: In the Beginning (1966) – Dimension 150 variant
- Doctor Dolittle (1967)
- Star! (1968)
- Hello, Dolly! (1969)
- Krakatoa, East of Java (1969) – selected scenes (see Super Panavision 70) – presented in 70 mm Cinerama
- Airport (1970)
- Patton (1970) – Dimension 150 variant
- The Last Valley (1971)
- Moonwalk One (1971)
- Baraka (1992)

== Awards ==
=== Feature film ===
| Year | Award | Category | Type | Title | Honorees |
|---|---|---|---|---|---|
| 1955 | Academy Award | Best Sound Recording | Won | Oklahoma! | Fred Hynes |
| 1957 | Academy Award | Academy Scientific and Technical Award | Won | Todd-AO System | Todd-AO Corp; Westrex Corp |
| 1958 | Academy Award | Best Sound | Won | South Pacific | Fred Hynes |
| 1959 | Academy Award | Best Sound | Nominated | Porgy and Bess | Fred Hynes |
| 1960 | Academy Award | Best Sound | Won | The Alamo | Fred Hynes |
| 1961 | Academy Award | Best Sound | Won | West Side Story | Fred Hynes |
| 1963 | Academy Award | Best Sound | Nominated | Cleopatra | Fred Hynes |
| 1965 | Academy Award | Best Sound | Won | The Sound of Music | Fred Hynes |
| 1972 | Academy Award | Best Sound | Won | Cabaret | Robert Knudson and David Hildyard |
| 1973 | Academy Award | Best Sound | Won | The Exorcist | Robert Knudson and Chris Newman |
| 1976 | Academy Award | Best Sound | Nominated | A Star is Born | Robert Knudson, Dan Wallin, Robert Glass and Tom Overton |
| 1977 | Academy Award | Best Sound | Nominated | Close Encounters of the Third Kind | Robert Knudson, Robert Glass, Don MacDougall and Gene S. Cantamessa |
| 1977 | Academy Award | Best Sound | Nominated | Sorcerer | Robert Knudson, Robert Glass, Richard Tyler and Jean-Louis Ducarme |
| 1978 | Academy Award | Best Sound | Nominated | Hooper | Robert Knudson, Robert Glass, Don MacDougall and Jack Solomon |
| 1979 | Academy Award | Best Sound | Nominated | 1941 | Robert Knudson, Robert Glass, Don MacDougall and Gene S. Cantamessa |
| 1982 | Academy Award | Best Sound | Won | E.T. the Extra-Terrestrial | Robert Knudson, Robert Glass, Don Digirolamo and Gene S. Cantamessa |
| 1985 | Academy Award | Best Sound | Won | Out of Africa | Chris Jenkins, Gary Alexander, Larry Stensvold and Peter Handford |
| 1987 | Academy Award | Best Sound | Nominated | Empire of the Sun | Robert Knudson, Don Digirolamo, John Boyd and Tony Dawe |
| 1988 | Academy Award | Best Sound | Nominated | Who Framed Roger Rabbit | Robert Knudson, John Boyd, Don Digirolamo and Tony Dawe |
| 1990 | Academy Award | Best Sound | Nominated | Dick Tracy | Chris Jenkins, David E. Campbell, D.M. Hemphill and Thomas Causey |
| 1992 | Academy Award | Best Sound | Won | The Last of the Mohicans | Chris Jenkins, Doug Hemphill, Mark Smith and Simon Kaye |
| 1993 | Academy Award | Best Sound | Nominated | Schindler's List | Andy Nelson, Steve Pederson, Scott Millan and Ron Judkins |
| 1994 | Academy Award | Best Sound | Won | Speed | Gregg Landaker, Steve Maslow, Bob Beemer and David MacMillan |
| 1994 | Academy Award | Best Sound | Nominated | Legends of the Fall | Paul Massey, David Campbell, Christopher David and Douglas Ganton |
| 1995 | Academy Award | Best Sound | Nominated | Braveheart | Andy Nelson, Scott Millan, Anna Behlmer and Brian Simmons |
| 1995 | Academy Award | Best Sound | Won | Apollo 13 | Rick Dior, Steve Pederson, Scott Millan and David MacMillan |
| 1996 | Academy Award | Best Sound | Nominated | Evita | Andy Nelson, Anna Behlmer and Ken Weston |
| 1997 | Academy Award | Best Sound | Nominated | L.A. Confidential | Andy Nelson, Anna Behlmer and Kirk Francis |
| 1998 | Academy Award | Best Sound | Won | Saving Private Ryan | Gary Rydstrom, Tom Johnson, Gary Summers and Ron Judkins |
| 2000 | Academy Award | Best Sound | Won | Gladiator | Scott Millan, Bob Beemer and Ken Weston |
| 2001 | Academy Award | Best Sound | Won | Black Hawk Down | Michael Minkler, Myron Nettinga and Chris Munro |
| 2002 | BAFTA Award | Best Sound | Nominated | Black Hawk Down | Michael Minkler, Myron Nettinga, Chris Munro |
| 2002 | Academy Award | Best Sound | Won | Chicago | Michael Minkler, Dominick Tavella and David Lee |
| 2003 | BAFTA Award | Best Sound | Won | Chicago | Michael Minkler, Dominick Tavella, David Lee |
| 2004 | BAFTA Award | Best Sound | Nominated | Kill Bill: Volume 1 | Michael Minkler, Myron Nettinga, Wylie Stateman, Mark Ulano |
| 2005 | BAFTA Award | Best Sound | Nominated | Collateral | Elliott Koretz, Lee Orloff, Michael Minkler, Myron Nettinga |
| 2006 | BAFTA Award | Best Sound | Nominated | Crash | Richard Van Dyke, Sandy Gendler, Adam Jenkins, Marc Fishman |
| 2006 | BAFTA Award | Best Sound | Nominated | Babel | José Antonio García, Jon Taylor, Christian P. Minkler, Martín Hernández |
| 2006 | Academy Award | Best Sound Mixing | Won | Dreamgirls | Michael Minkler, Bob Beemer and Willie D. Burton |
| 2007 | Academy Award | Best Sound Mixing | Won | The Bourne Ultimatum | Scott Millan, David Parker and Kirk Francis |
| 2009 | Academy Award | Best Sound Mixing | Nominated | Inglourious Basterds | Michael Minkler, Tony Lamberti and Mark Ulano |
| 2013 | BAFTA Award | Best Sound | Nominated | Django Unchained | Wylie Stateman, Michael Minkler, Tony Lamberti, Mark Ulano |

=== Television ===
| Year | Award | Category | Type | Title | Honorees |
|---|---|---|---|---|---|
| 1970 | Emmy Award | Outstanding Film Sound Mixing | Won | Mission: Impossible | Dominick Gaffey and Gordon L. Day |
| 1979 | Emmy Award | Outstanding Film Sound Editing | Won | Friendly Fire | Bill Wistrom |
| 1980 | Emmy Award | Outstanding Film Sound Mixing | Won | The Ordeal of Dr. Mudd | Ray Barons, David E. Campbell, Robert Pettis and John T. Reitz |
| 1982 | Emmy Award | Outstanding Film Sound Mixing | Won | Hill Street Blues: Personal Foul | Bill Marky, Robert W. Glass Jr., Bill Nicholson and Howard Wilmarth |
| 1983 | Emmy Award | Outstanding Film Sound Editing for a Series | Won | Hill Street Blues: Stan the Man | Sam Horta, Donald W. Ernst, Avram D. Gold, Eileen Horta, Constance A. Kazmer and Gary Krivacek |
| 1983 | Emmy Award | Outstanding Film Sound Mixing for a Limited Series or a Special | Won | The Scarlet and the Black | John W. Mitchell, Gordon L. Day, Stan Wetzel and Howard Wilmarth |
| 1984 | Emmy Award | Outstanding Film Sound Mixing for a Limited Series or a Special | Won | A Streetcar Named Desire | Richard Raguse, William L. McCaughey, Mel Metcalfe and Terry Porter |
| 1984 | Emmy Award | Outstanding Live and Tape Sound Mixin and Sound Effects for a Series | Won | Real People: Hawaii Show - Sarah's Wedding | Mark Hanes, Stu Fox, Dean Okrand and Edward F. Suski |
| 1985 | Emmy Award | Outstanding Film Sound Mixing For A Series | Won | Cagney & Lacey: Heat | Maury Harris, John Asman, Bill Nicholson and Ken S. Polk |
| 1985 | Emmy Award | Outstanding Film Sound Mixing For A Limited Series Or A Special | Won | Space: Part 5 | Clark King, David J. Hudson, Mel Metcalfe and Terry Porter |
| 1985 | Emmy Award | Outstanding Live And Tape Sound Mixing And Sound Effects For A Series | Won | Cheers: The Executive's Executioner | Doug Gray, Michael Ballin, Thomas J. Huth and Sam Black |
| 1987 | Emmy Award | Outstanding Sound Editing for a Series | Won | Max Headroom: Blipverts | Doug Grindstaff, Richard Corwin, Clark Conrad, Brad Sherman, Richard Taylor, James Wolvington and Dick Bernstein |
| 1987 | Emmy Award | Outstanding Sound Editing for a Miniseries or a Special | Won | Unnatural Causes | Vince Gutierrez, William H. Angarola, Clark Conrad, Doug Gray, Mace Matiosian, Anthony Mazzei, Michael J. Mitchell, Matt Sawelson, Edward F. Suski, Dan Carlin Sr., James Wolvington, Barbara Issak and Jon Johnson |
| 1991 | Emmy Award | Outstanding Sound Mixing for a Comedy Series or a Special | Won | Doogie Howser, M.D.: Doogenstein | Joe Kenworthy, Dean Okrand, Bill Thiederman and Mike Getlin |
| 1992 | Emmy Award | Outstanding Sound Editing for a Series | Won | Law & Order: Heaven | David Hankins, Frank A. Fuller Jr., Peter Bergren, David A. Cohen, Richard Thomas, Barbara Issak, James Hebenstreit, Albert Edmund Lord III and Barbara Schechter |
| 1992 | Emmy Award | Outstanding Sound Mixing for a Comedy Series or a Special | Won | Doogie Howser, M.D.: Lonesome Doog | Joe Kenworthy, Bill Thiederman, Dean Okrand and Mike Getlin |
| 1993 | Emmy Award | Outstanding Sound Mixing for a Comedy Series or a Special | Won | Doogie Howser, M.D.: Doogie Got a Gun | Joe Kenworthy, Mike Getlin, Dean Okrand and Bill Thiederman |
| 1996 | Emmy Award | Outstanding Sound Mixing | Won | Flipper | Kevin Burns, Jon Taylor and Chris Minkler |
| 1997 | Emmy Award | Outstanding Sound Mixing | Won | Flipper | Jon Taylor, Kevin Burns and Todd Orr |
| 1997 | Emmy Award | Outstanding Sound Mixing for a Drama Miniseries or a Special | Nominated | Apollo 11 | Todd Orr, Kevin Burns, Jon Taylor |
| 1997 | Emmy Award | Outstanding Sound Mixing for a Drama Miniseries or a Special | Won | Titanic | Adam Jenkins, Don Digirolamo, Davide E. Fluhr |
| 1998 | Emmy Award | Outstanding Sound Mixing for a Drama Miniseries or a Movie | Nominated | From The Earth To The Moon: That's All There Is | Rich Ash and Adam Sawelson |
| 1998 | Emmy Award | Outstanding Sound Mixing for a Drama Miniseries or a Movie | Nominated | From The Earth To The Moon: 1968 | Scott Millan and Brad Sherman |
| 1998 | Emmy Award | Outstanding Sound Mixing for a Drama Miniseries or a Movie | Nominated | From The Earth To The Moon: Le Voyage Dans La Lune | Todd Orr and Kevin Burns |
| 1998 | Emmy Award | Outstanding Sound Mixing for a Drama Miniseries or a Movie | Won | 12 Angry Men | Adam Jenkins and David E. Fluhr |
| 1998 | Emmy Award | Outstanding Sound Editing for a Miniseries, Movie or a Special | Nominated | Creature | Anna MacKenzie, Mike Marchain, William Angarola, Steve Bissinger, Mark J. Cleary, Robert Guastini, Ellen Heuer, Rick Hinson, Jason Lezama, Aaron Martin, Craig Ng, Cindy Rabideau, Raymond Spiess III, Ray Spiess Jr. |
| 1998 | Emmy Award | Outstanding Sound Mixing for a Miniseries or a Movie | Nominated | A Lesson Before Dying | Rich Ash and Gary Alexander |
| 1998 | Emmy Award | Outstanding Sound Editing for a Series | Nominated | The Visitor: Pilot | Anna MacKenzie, William Angarola, Michael Broomberg, Mark J. Cleary, Robert Guastini, Rick Hinson, Jimmy Moriana, Cindy Rabideau, Jay Richardson, Raymond Spiess III, Ray Spiess Jr. |
| 1999 | Emmy Award | Outstanding Sound Editing for a Miniseries, Movie or a Special | Nominated | Houdini | Anna MacKenzie, Mike Marchain, Skip Adams, William Angarola, Zane Bruce, Robert Guastini, Rick Hinson, Cindy Rabideau, Joe Sabella, Ray Spiess, Jr. and Jeanette Surga |
| 1999 | Emmy Award | Outstanding Sound Editing for a Miniseries, Movie or a Special | Nominated | A Soldier's Sweetheart | Anna MacKenzie, Mike Marchain, William Angarola, Ron Finn, Robert Guastini, Rick Hinson, Jason Lezama, Chris Moriana, Cindy Rabideau, Catherine Rose, Raymond Spiess III and Ray Spiess Jr. |
| 1999 | Emmy Award | Outstanding Sound Mixing for a Drama Series | Nominated | The Sopranos: A Hit Is A Hit | Todd Orr, Ron Evans, Adam Sawelson |
| 1999 | Emmy Award | Outstanding Sound Editing for a Series | Nominated | The Sopranos: I Dream Of Jeannie Cusamano | Anna MacKenzie, Mike Marchain, William Angarola, Benjamin Beardwood, Zane Bruce, Mark, Kathryn Dayak, Robert Guastini, Rick Hinson, Cindy Rabideau, Joe Sabella, Ray Spiess, Jr. and Bruce Swanson |
| 1999 | Emmy Award | Outstanding Sound Editing for a Series | Nominated | Buffy the Vampire Slayer: Lover's Walk | Anna MacKenzie, Mike Marchain, William Angarola, Fernand Bos, Zane Bruce, Mark Cleary, Robert Guastini, Rick Hinson, Cindy Rabideau, Joe Sabella and Ray Spiess, Jr. |
| 2000 | Emmy Award | Outstanding Sound Mixing for a Drama Series | Nominated | The Sopranos: D-Girl | Todd Orr, Kevin Burns, Tom Perry |
| 2000 | Emmy Award | Outstanding Sound Editing for a Series | Nominated | The Others: Eyes | Mace Matiosian, Harry Cohen, Ruth Adelman, Mike Broomberg, Zane Bruce, Diane Griffen, Jivan Tahmizian and Guy Tsujimoto |
| 2001 | Emmy Award | Outstanding Sound Mixing for a Miniseries or a Movie | Nominated | Dirty Pictures | Todd Orr, Kevin Burns, Tom Perry |
| 2001 | Emmy Award | Outstanding Sound Mixing for a Miniseries or a Movie | Nominated | South Pacific | Rick Ash, Joe Earle, Joel Moss |
| 2001 | Emmy Award | Outstanding Single-Camera Sound Mixing for a Series | Nominated | The Sopranos: D-Girl | Todd Orr, Kevin Burns, Fred Tator |
| 2001 | Emmy Award | Outstanding Sound Editing for a Series | Nominated | CSI: Crime Scene Investigation: 35K OBO | Mace Matiosian, Ruth Adelman, Zane Bruce, Stan Jones, Joe Sabella, Jivan Tahmizian, David Van Slyke |
| 2002 | Emmy Award | Outstanding Sound Mixing for a Miniseries or a Movie | Nominated | Band of Brothers: Carentan | Todd Orr and Kevin Burns |
| 2002 | Emmy Award | Outstanding Single-Camera Sound Mixing for a Series | Nominated | CSI: Crime Scene Investigation: Another Toothpick | Yuri Reese and Bill Smith |
| 2002 | Emmy Award | Outstanding Sound Editing for a Series | Nominated | CSI: Crime Scene Investigation: Chasing the Bus | Mace Matiosian, Ruth Adelman, Zane Bruce, Sheri Ozeki, Joe Sabella, Jivan Tahmizian, David Van Slyke |
| 2003 | Emmy Award | Outstanding Sound Mixing for a Miniseries or a Movie | Nominated | A Painted House | Todd Orr and Kevin Burns |
| 2003 | Emmy Award | Outstanding Sound Mixing for a Miniseries or a Movie | Nominated | The Music Man | Todd Orr and Kevin Burns |
| 2003 | Emmy Award | Outstanding Sound Mixing for a Miniseries or a Movie | Won | Live From Baghdad | Adam Jenkins, Rick Ash, Drew Webster |
| 2003 | Emmy Award | Outstanding Single-Camera Sound Mixing for a Series | Nominated | The Sopranos: Whoever Did This | Todd Orr and Kevin Burns |
| 2003 | Emmy Award | Outstanding Single-Camera Sound Mixing for a Series | Nominated | CSI: Crime Scene Investigation: Revenge Is Best Served Cold" | Yuri Reese and Bill Smith |
| 2003 | Emmy Award | Outstanding Sound Editing for a Series | Won | CSI: Crime Scene Investigation: Fight Night | Mace Matiosian, Ruth Adelman, Zane Bruce, Sheri Ozeki, Joseph Sabella, Jivan Tahmizian, David Van Slyke |
| 2004 | Emmy Award | Outstanding Sound Mixing for a Miniseries or a Movie | Nominated | Something the Lord Made | Adam Jenkins and Rick Ash |
| 2004 | Emmy Award | Outstanding Sound Mixing for a Miniseries or a Movie | Nominated | Traffic: Part 1 | Marc Fishman, Tony Lamberti, Kevin Burns |
| 2004 | Emmy Award | Outstanding Single-Camera Sound Mixing for a Series | Nominated | The Sopranos: Irregular Around The Margins | Todd Orr and Kevin Burns |
| 2004 | Emmy Award | Outstanding Single-Camera Sound Mixing for a Series | Nominated | CSI: Crime Scene Investigation: Grissom vs. The Volcano | Yuri Reese and Bill Smith |
| 2004 | Emmy Award | Outstanding Sound Editing for a Miniseries, Movie or a Special | Won | And Starring Pancho Villa as Himself | Tony Lamberti, Zack Davis, Lou Kleinman, Michael Lyle, Carey Milbradt, Allan K. Rosen, Geoffrey G. Rubay, Bruce Tanis, Karen Vassar, Nicholas Viterelli, Dave Williams, Joshua Winget |
| 2005 | Emmy Award | Outstanding Single-Camera Sound Mixing for a Miniseries or a Movie | Nominated | Lackawanna Blues | Adam Jenkins and Rick Ash |
| 2005 | Emmy Award | Outstanding Single-Camera Sound Mixing for a Miniseries or a Movie | Nominated | The Life and Death of Peter Sellers | Adam Jenkins and Rick Ash |
| 2005 | Emmy Award | Outstanding Single-Camera Sound Mixing for a Miniseries or a Movie | Won | Warm Springs | Adam Jenkins and Rick Ash |
| 2005 | Emmy Award | Outstanding Single-Camera Sound Mixing for a Series | Nominated | CSI: Crime Scene Investigation: Down the Drain | Yuri Reese and Bill Smith |
| 2005 | Emmy Award | Outstanding Sound Editing for a Series | Nominated | CSI: Crime Scene Investigation: Down the Drain | Mace Matiosian, Ruth Adelman, Zane Bruce, Christine Luethje, Todd Nieson, Joseph Sabella, Jivan Tahmizian, David Van Slyke |
| 2005 | Emmy Award | Outstanding Sound Editing for a Series | Nominated | CSI: Miami: Lost Son | Ruth Adelman, Zane Bruce, Ann Hadsell, Bradley C. Katona, Skye Lewin, Todd Nieson, Joseph Sabella |
| 2005 | Emmy Award | Outstanding Sound Editing for a Miniseries, Movie or a Special | Won | The Life and Death of Peter Sellers | Anna MacKenzie, Victoria Brazier, Felicity Cottrell, Zack Davis, Richard Ford, Tim Hands, Laura Lovejoy, James Mather, Geoff Rubay, Ruth Sullivan |
| 2006 | Emmy Award | Outstanding Sound Editing for a Series | Nominated | CSI: Crime Scene Investigation: A Bullet Runs Through It: Part 1 | Mace Matiosian, Ruth Adelman, Mark Allen, Zane Bruce, Troy Hardy, Joseph Sabella, Jivan Tahmizian, David Van Slyke |
| 2006 | Emmy Award | Outstanding Single-Camera Sound Mixing for a Series | Nominated | CSI: Crime Scene Investigation: A Bullet Runs Through It | Yuri Reese and Bill Smith |
| 2007 | Emmy Award | Outstanding Sound Editing for a Series | Nominated | CSI: Miami: No Man's Land | Tim Kimmel, Ruth Adelman, Todd Niesen, Bradley C. Katona, Skye Lewin, Zane Bruce, Joseph Sabella |
| 2007 | Emmy Award | Outstanding Sound Mixing for a Comedy or Drama Series (One-Hour) | Nominated | The Sopranos: Stage 5 | Kevin Burns and Todd Orr |
| 2007 | Emmy Award | Outstanding Sound Mixing for a Comedy or Drama Series (One-Hour) | Won | CSI: Crime Scene Investigation: Living Doll | Yuri Reese and Bill Smith |
| 2007 | Emmy Award | Outstanding Sound Mixing for a Comedy or Drama Series (Half-Hour) And Animation | Won | Entourage: One Day In The Valley | Dennis Kirk and Mark Fleming |
| 2008 | Emmy Award | Outstanding Sound Mixing for a Comedy or Drama Series (Half-Hour) and Animation | Nominated | Entourage: Adios Amigo | Dennis Kirk and Bill Jackson |
| 2008 | Emmy Award | Outstanding Sound Editing for a Series | Nominated | CSI: Crime Scene Investigation: Fight Night | Mace Matiosian, Ruth Adelman, Jivan Tahmizian, David Van Slyke, Chad Hughes, Joseph Sabella, Zane Bruce |
| 2008 | Emmy Award | Outstanding Sound Mixing for a Miniseries or a Movie | Nominated | John Adams: Join Or Die | Michael Minkler and Bob Beemer |
| 2008 | Emmy Award | Outstanding Sound Mixing for a Miniseries or a Movie | Won | John Adams: Don't Tread On Me | Marc Fishman and Tony Lamberti |
| 2009 | Emmy Award | Outstanding Sound Editing for a Series | Nominated | CSI: Crime Scene Investigation: Mascara | Mace Matiosian, Ruth Adelman, Jivan Tahmizian, David Van Slyke, Joseph Sabella and James Bailey |
| 2009 | Emmy Award | Outstanding Sound Mixing for a Comedy or Drama Series (Half-Hour) And Animation | Won | Entourage: Pie | Tom Stasinis CAS, Dennis Kirk and Bill Jackson |
| 2010 | CAS Award | Sound Mixing - Television Series | Won | Mad Men: Guy Walks Into an Advertising Agency | Ken Teaney, Todd Orr, Peter Bentley |
| 2010 | Emmy Award | Outstanding Sound Mixing for a Comedy or Drama Series (Half-Hour) and Animation | Won | Entourage: One Car, Two Car, Red Car, Blue Car' | Tom Stasinis CAS, Dennis Kirk, Alec St. John and Todd Orr |
| 2010 | Emmy Award | Outstanding Sound Mixing for a Miniseries or a Movie | Nominated | The Pacific: Part Nine | Michael Minkler, Daniel Leahy, and Gary Wilkins |
| 2010 | Emmy Award | Outstanding Sound Mixing for a Miniseries or a Movie | Nominated | 'The Pacific: Part Eight | Michael Minkler, Daniel Leahy, Marc Fishman, Gary Wilkins |
| 2010 | Emmy Award | Outstanding Sound Mixing for a Miniseries or a Movie | Nominated | The Pacific: Part Five | Michael Minkler, Daniel Leahy, Craig Mann, Andrew Ramage |
| 2010 | Emmy Award | Outstanding Sound Mixing for a Miniseries or a Movie | Won | The Pacific: Part Two | Michael Minkler, Daniel Leahy, Andrew Ramage |
| 2011 | Emmy Award | Outstanding Sound Editing for a Series | Nominated | CSI: NY: Life Sentence | Mark Relyea, Edmund Lachmann, David Barbee, Ruth Adelman, Kevin McCullough, Joshua Winget, Joseph T. Sabella and James M. Bailey |
| 2011 | Emmy Award | Outstanding Sound Editing for a Series | Nominated | Nikita: Pandora | George Haddad, Dale Chaloukian, Ruth Adelman, Chad J. Hughes, Ashley Revell, James Bailey and Joseph T. Sabella |
| 2011 | Emmy Award | Outstanding Sound Mixing for a Comedy or Drama Series (One-Hour) | Nominated | Mad Men: The Suitcase | Ken Teaney, Todd Orr, Peter Bentley |
| 2011 | Emmy Award | Outstanding Sound Mixing for a Comedy or Drama Series (Half-Hour) and Animation | Won | Family Guy: Road to the North Pole | James F. Fitzpatrick and Patrick Clark |
| 2012 | Emmy Award | Outstanding Sound Mixing for a Comedy or Drama Series (Half-Hour) and Animation | Nominated | Entourage: The End | Tom Stasinis, Dennis Kirk, Todd Orr |
| 2012 | Emmy Award | Outstanding Sound Mixing for a Comedy or Drama Series (One-Hour) | Won | Game of Thrones: Blackwater | Mathew Waters, Onnalee Blank, Ronan Hill, Mervyn Moore |
| 2012 | Emmy Award | Outstanding Sound Editing for a Series | Won | Game of Thrones: Blackwater | Peter Brown, Kira Roessler, Tim Hands, Paul Aulicino, Stephen P. Robinson, Vanessa Lapato, Brett Voss, James Moriana, Jeffrey Wilhoit and David Klotz |
| 2012 | Emmy Award | Outstanding Sound Editing for a Series | Nominated | CSI: Miami: Blown Away | Timothy I. Kimmel, Brad Katona, Ruth Adelman, Todd Niesen, Skye Lewin, Joseph Sabella and James Bailey |
| 2013 | CAS Award | Sound Mixing - Television Series | Nominated | Mad Men: Commissions and Fees | Ken Teaney, Alec St. John, Peter Bentley |
| 2013 | CAS Award | Sound Mixing - Television Series | Nominated | Game of Thrones: Blackwater | Onnalee Blank, Mathew Waters, Ronan Hill and Brett Voss |
| 2013 | Emmy Award | Outstanding Sound Editing for a Series | Nominated | Nikita: Aftermath | George Haddad, Ruth Adelman, Chad J. Hughes, Steve Papagiannis, Dale Chaloukian, Ashley Revell, James M. Bailey |
| 2013 | Emmy Award | Outstanding Sound Mixing for a Comedy or Drama Series (One-Hour) | Nominated | Mad Men: The Flood | Ken Teaney, Alec St. John, Peter Bentley |
| 2013 | Emmy Award | Outstanding Sound Editing for a Series | Nominated | Game of Thrones: And Now His Watch Is Ended | Tim Kimmel, Paula Fairfield, Jed M. Dodge, Bradley C. Katona, David Klotz, Brett Voss, Jeffrey Wilhoit, James Moriana |
| 2013 | Emmy Award | Outstanding Sound Mixing for a Comedy or Drama Series (One-Hour) | Nominated | Game of Thrones: And Now His Watch Is Ended | Mathew Waters, Onnalee Blank, Ronan Hill |

== See also ==
- 70 mm film
- Cinerama
- Glen Glenn Sound
- List of 70 mm films
- List of film formats
- Philips DP70—the theater projector developed as part of the Todd-AO system
- Super Panavision 70
- Super Technirama 70
- Ultra Panavision 70
