= Gregg Baxter =

American sound editor

- Other name: Greg Baxter
- Occupation: Sound editor
- Years active: 1986-present

Gregg Baxter is a sound editor who was nominated at the 66th Academy Awards. He was nominated for the film Cliffhanger, he shared the nomination with Wylie Stateman. This was in Best Sound Editing.

== Selected filmography ==
- Little Boy (2015)
- Get on Up (2014)
- Inglourious Basterds (2009)
- Wanted (2008)
- Troy (2004)
- The Insider (1999)
- Speed 2: Cruise Control (1997)
- Congo (1995)
- Nixon (1995)
- Outbreak (1995)
- Natural Born Killers (1994)
- Speechless (1994)
- True Lies (1994)
- Alive (1993)
- Cliffhanger (1993)
- In the Line of Fire (1993)
- The Last of the Mohicans (1992)
- Curly Sue (1991)
- Back to the Future Part II (1989)
- Mystic Pizza (1988)
