= Lone Survivor =

2013 film by Peter Berg

- Theatrical release poster
- Directed by: Peter Berg
- Written by: Peter Berg
- Based on: Lone Survivor by: Marcus Luttrell; Patrick Robinson
- Produced by: Peter Berg; Sarah Aubrey; Randall Emmett; Norton Herrick; Barry Spikings; Akiva Goldsman; Mark Wahlberg; Stephen Levinson; Vitaly Grigoriants
- Starring: Mark Wahlberg; Taylor Kitsch; Emile Hirsch; Ben Foster; Eric Bana
- Cinematography: Tobias Schliessler
- Edited by: Colby Parker Jr.
- Music by: Explosions in the Sky; Steve Jablonsky
- Production companies: Emmett/Furla Films; Film 44; Foresight Unlimited; Herrick Entertainment; Spikings Entertainment; Envision Entertainment; Closest to the Hole Productions; Leverage Management
- Distributed by: Universal Pictures (United States, United Kingdom, Ireland and Italy); Foresight Unlimited (Worldwide)
- Release dates: November 12, 2013 (AFI Film Festival); January 10, 2014 (United States)
- Running time: 121 minutes
- Country: United States
- Language: English
- Budget: $40 million
- Box office: $154.8 million

Lone Survivor is a 2013 American action war drama film based on the 2007 nonfiction book by Marcus Luttrell with Patrick Robinson. Set during the war in Afghanistan, it dramatizes the unsuccessful United States Navy SEALs counter-insurgent mission Operation Red Wings, during which a four-man SEAL reconnaissance and surveillance team was given the task of tracking down the Taliban leader Ahmad Shah. The film was written and directed by Peter Berg, and stars Mark Wahlberg, Taylor Kitsch, Emile Hirsch, Ben Foster, and Eric Bana.

Upon first learning of the book in 2007, Berg arranged several meetings with Luttrell to discuss adapting the book to film. Universal Pictures acquired the film rights in August 2007, after bidding against other major studios. In re-enacting events, Berg drew much of his screenplay from Luttrell's eyewitness accounts in the book, as well as autopsy and incident reports related to the mission. After directing Battleship (2012) for Universal, Berg resumed working on Lone Survivor. Principal photography began in October 2012 and concluded in November, after 42 days. Filming took place on location in New Mexico, using digital cinematography. Luttrell and several other Navy SEAL veterans acted as technical advisors, while multiple branches of the United States Armed Forces aided the production. Two companies, Industrial Light & Magic and Image Engine, created the visual effects.

Lone Survivor opened in limited release in the United States on December 25, 2013, before opening across North America on January 10, 2014. The film received positive reviews; critics praised Berg's direction and realism, as well as the acting, story, visuals and battle sequences, though some criticism was directed at the film's focus on action rather than characterization. It grossed $154.8 million, of which $125 million was from North America, against a budget of $40 million. It was chosen by National Board of Review as one of the top ten films of 2013 and received two Oscar nominations for Best Sound Editing and Best Sound Mixing.

== Plot ==
In 2005, Ahmad Shah, a local Taliban warlord in the Korangal Valley is identified as the person responsible for the deaths of several Marines, plus many villagers who are believed to have aided the American forces in Afghanistan. A Navy SEAL team, consisting of Michael Murphy, Matthew Axelson, Danny Dietz, and Marcus Luttrell, is ordered to capture Shah.

Inserted overnight via helicopter, the four-man team approaches Shah's last known location. Due to the mountainous terrain the team is operating in, communications with J-Bad become difficult. Though the team identifies Shah, they are discovered by local villagers, one of whom carries a walkie-talkie—believing that the villagers are Taliban sympathisers, the SEALs debate setting them free or killing them. Murphy orders them to be set free.

The team proceeds up the mountainside, aborting their mission and intending to extract. However, the villagers alert the Taliban, who pursue the team. Though the SEALs begin with the advantage, the sheer number of Taliban forces overwhelms their position. Pushed toward a ravine, the SEALs are given little choice but to jump, but are thrown off balance when an RPG detonates in front of them. Dietz is killed, and the remaining SEALs try desperately to raise support. Murphy scales the cliff to gain a clear signal which finally alerts the QRF, though he is killed shortly after.

The QRF scrambles to the SEALs’ aid, though the two Chinook helicopters fly in without Apache support. Briefly encouraged by the arrival of reinforcements, Luttrell and Axelson watch helplessly as an RPG shoots down one Chinook. The second aborts, leaving Luttrell and Axelson to fend for themselves. Already grievously wounded from battle, the disoriented Axelson is cornered by Taliban gunmen and killed. Luttrell is also discovered, though he survives an RPG attack, hides from his pursuers overnight, and escapes.

Wandering alone, Luttrell happens across a small stream when he is discovered by Mohammad Gulab, a local Pashtun. Taking the wounded and exhausted Luttrell into his care, Gulab hides him from the Taliban in his home, and also sends another villager to the nearest American base to report on Luttrell's location. Shah arrives at the village to execute Luttrell; however, the villagers resist. Shah leaves, but returns later with several Taliban gunmen and engages the villagers. Rangers arrive mid-battle and evacuate Luttrell, who also thanks Mohammad for his assistance.

Images of the real Luttrell, Gulab and the fallen service members killed during the mission are shown during a four-minute montage, and an epilogue explains that the Pashtun villagers agreed to help Luttrell as part of a traditional code of honor known as the Pashtunwali.

== Cast ==
What makes this story so special is the bond and the camaraderie between the guys, but also the state of where we are in the world today. The act of heroism by Gulab and his fellow villagers moved me the most. I found it so inspiring, and it gave me so much hope for the world.

— Mark Wahlberg
- Mark Wahlberg as Hospital corpsman First Class Marcus Luttrell
- Taylor Kitsch as Lieutenant Michael P. "Murph" Murphy
- Emile Hirsch as Gunner's mate Second Class Danny Dietz
- Ben Foster as Sonar technician Second Class Matthew "Axe" Axelson
- Eric Bana as Lieutenant Commander Erik S. Kristensen

Ali Suliman, who previously collaborated with Berg on the 2007 film The Kingdom, plays Mohammad Gulab, an Afghan villager. Alexander Ludwig plays Navy SEAL Machinist's Mate Shane Patton. Marcus Luttrell appears in an uncredited role. The cast is rounded out by Yousuf Azami as Ahmad Shah, a Taliban leader; Sammy Sheik as Taraq, a field commander of the Taliban group; Rich Ting as PO2 James Suh; Dan Bilzerian as Senior Chief Daniel Healy; Jerry Ferrara as United States Marine Corps Sgt Hasslert; Scott Elrod as Peter Musselman; Rohan Chand as Gulab's son; and Corey Large as US Navy SEAL Captain Kenney. Zarin Mohammad Rahimi, who acted as a technical advisor during production, appears as an elderly shepherd who discovers the four-man SEAL team during the mission; Nicholas Patel and Daniel Arroyo play the goat herders who assist the shepherd.

== Production ==
=== Development ===
When I read the book, I knew instantly that this would be a perfect movie for [Berg]. His strengths as a director are in taking an audience into a closed world ... He loves to take an audience into a world and show them the details but then hit them with this emotional wallop. The book has this incredibly emotional story of brotherhood and sacrifice, and then ultimately, in the story with Gulab, this grace and humanity even in the midst of war.

— Sarah Aubrey (producer)

Following publication of Marcus Luttrell and Patrick Robinson's nonfiction book Lone Survivor (2007), producer Barry Spikings met Luttrell's attorney Alan Schwartz, who was interested in making a film adaptation. Schwartz suggested that Spikings' son-in-law Akiva Goldsman write the screenplay. Goldsman did not believe he was the right screenwriter for the project, and suggested that Peter Berg write and direct the film. Spikings and Goldsman passed the book on to Berg's producing partner Sarah Aubrey. Berg first learned of the book while filming Hancock, and after he and Aubrey read it, they arranged several meetings with Luttrell to discuss a film adaptation. Luttrell also viewed a rough cut of Berg's then-upcoming film The Kingdom (2007), and was impressed by his direction. "[Berg] caught me with his attention to detail", he said, "and how he portrayed the enemy in the film."

The film rights to the book had become the subject of a bidding war among a host of established studios, including Warner Bros., Sony Pictures Entertainment, Paramount Pictures, DreamWorks, and Universal Pictures. Universal secured the rights in August 2007, for more than $2 million. The studio had also acquired the United States distribution rights as part of a negative pickup deal with the film's producers. Berg then chose to direct Battleship (2012) for Universal before resuming production on Lone Survivor.

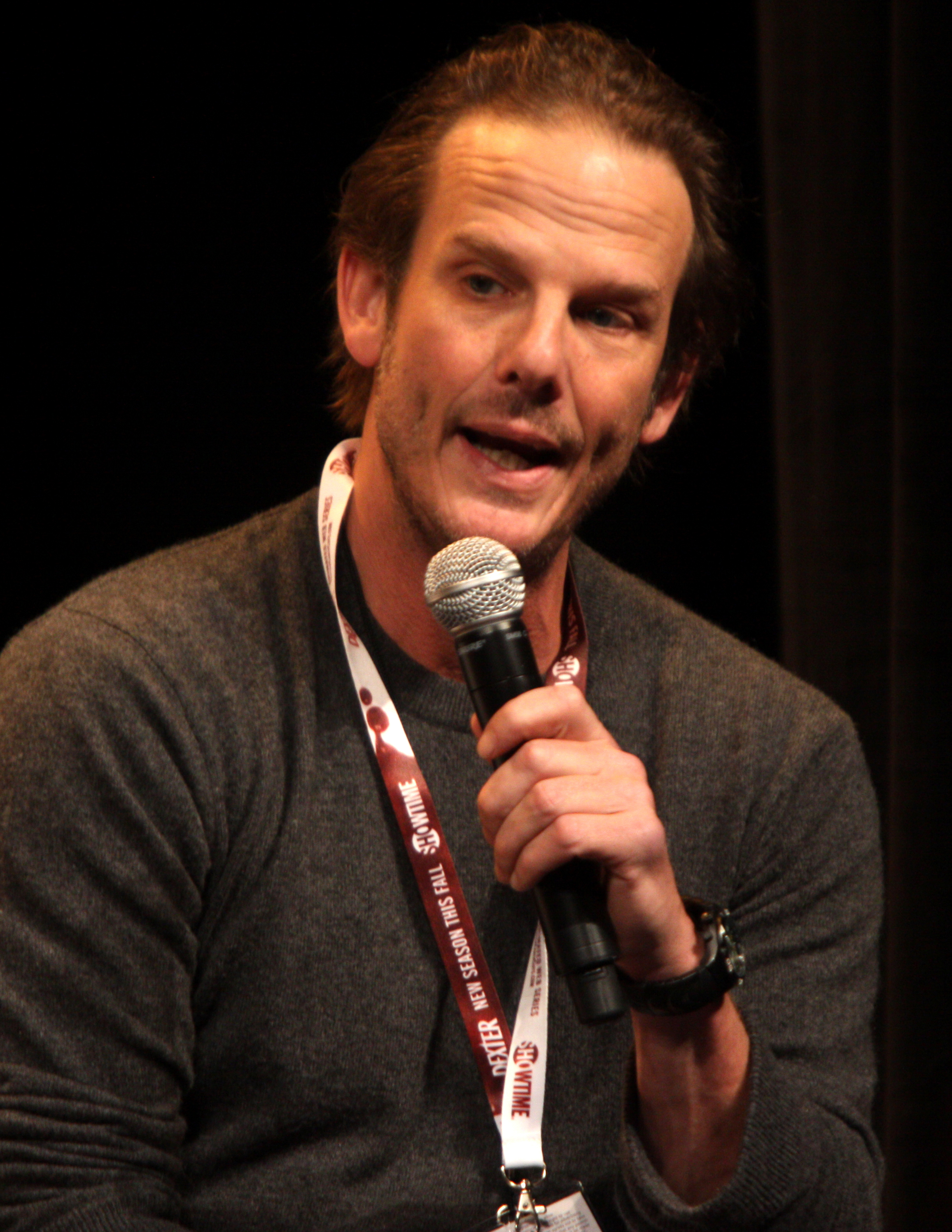
Writer and director Peter Berg, pictured in 2012

When Mark Wahlberg read the script and expressed an interest in portraying Luttrell, he and his manager Stephen Levinson pitched the concept to producer Randall Emmett, the co-founder of Emmett/Furla Films, during the 2012 filming of 2 Guns. After reading the script, Emmett traveled to Los Angeles, where he met with Berg and Aubrey to discuss the film's production. After Universal secured the rights to distribute Lone Survivor in the United States, United Kingdom and Italy, executive producer Mark Damon's independent film company Foresight Unlimited took Berg and Emmett to the 2012 Cannes Film Festival to secure worldwide pre-sales. The film attracted $30 million in worldwide pre-sales to distributors in 40 international markets.

Lone Survivor had an estimated budget of $40 million. Three production companies – Emmett/Furla Films, Herrick Entertainment, and Envision Entertainment – collaborated to finance the film. In addition, as part of the negative pickup deal with Universal, the film's producers—Berg, Aubrey, Spikings, Goldsman, Emmett, Wahlberg, Levinson, Norton Herrick, and Vitaly Grigoriants—contributed at least $1 million each to finance production costs. To avoid further costs, Berg chose to work for a minimum salary allowed under Directors Guild of America rules, $17,000 a week. He also convinced several cast and crew members to lower their asking prices.

=== Casting ===
Berg had discussed the project with Wahlberg, Taylor Kitsch, Emile Hirsch, and Ben Foster years earlier. Universal held an open casting call in Los Angeles, aiding in the filmmakers' search for supporting actors, extras, photo doubles, and stand-ins. In August 2012, it was announced that Alexander Ludwig and Eric Bana had joined the cast.

Although Wahlberg, Kitsch, Hirsch and Foster had physically trained for their roles prior to filming, Luttrell organized a three-week training regimen at a bootcamp in New Mexico, where the actors were trained by elite military personnel in weapons, military communications, and tactics. Military advisor Mark Semos trained the four actors in live-firing exercises so they could feel the physical impact of firing military rifles. They also practiced "shoot move cover" drills to enable them to react convincingly as Navy SEALs during filming.

=== Writing ===
This story is about working together for something bigger than our ego, bigger than our individuality. It's about coming together as a group—protecting each other, loving each other, looking out for each other—and finding a greater strength as a team than you could ever find as an individual. Marcus [Luttrell] wrote a book that, as much as it's about 19 people being killed on a tragic day in Afghanistan, is about brotherhood, sacrifice and team commitment.

— Peter Berg (writer, director and producer)

While the book chronicles Luttrell's 1999 enlistment and training, as well as his 2005 deployment to Afghanistan, Berg decided that the film adaptation would focus mainly on the events of the failed United States Navy SEALs mission Operation Red Wings, as well as the bonding and camaraderie of Luttrell and his fallen teammates. Prior to writing the screenplay, Berg met with the families of the deceased. "My research started with meeting the families of the SEAL teammates who were killed", he said. "I went to New York and met the Murphys. I went to Colorado and met the Dietzes, and I went to Northern California and met the Axelsons. After spending time with them, you realize that these kids were the best and the brightest; they were the stars of the families. The grief and the wounds are still very raw. You would have to be inhuman to not feel the responsibility when that kind of grief gets shared with you." Berg also expressed that he was motivated by the families to make the story as realistic as possible; his goal was "to put [the viewer] into the experience of what these guys went through. And it was obviously a traumatic and violent and exhausting experience".

To provide authenticity, Luttrell moved into Berg's home for one month while Berg was writing the script. He acted as a consultant, detailing to Berg his eyewitness account of the events that unfolded during Operation Red Wings. Berg later embedded with a Navy SEAL team—becoming the first civilian to do so—and lived with them for a month in Iraq while he continued writing the screenplay. In re-enacting the injuries and deaths of the fallen Navy SEAL servicemen, Berg relied on Luttrell's eyewitness accounts from the book, as well as autopsy reports of the deceased and after-action reports. The United States Navy provided incident reports related to the mission, as well as archival military training footage, which is shown during the film's opening credits sequence. Still photographs shown during the opening credits sequence were taken from Richard D. Schoenberg's war photography book The Only Easy Day Was Yesterday: Making Navy SEALs. During filming, there were some dialogue changes in comparison to Berg's script, as the filmmaker occasionally encouraged the actors to improvise their lines.

=== Filming ===
==== Principal photography ====
Principal photography was scheduled to start on September 15, 2012, but did not commence until October of that year. The film was shot on location in New Mexico. The production received a 25% tax credit for shooting in the state. Berg was granted creative autonomy, as Universal did not fully oversee the film's production. With Lone Survivor, Berg continued his trademark of having war veterans as part of his film crew. Luttrell, along with several other Navy SEAL veterans, acted as technical advisors during the production. In addition, senior military advisor Harry Humphries, a former Navy SEAL who had worked with Berg on Hancock and The Kingdom, served as an associate producer.

Filming first took place at the Sangre de Cristo Mountains of the Santa Fe National Forest. Eight days were spent on mountains ranging from 11,000 to 12,000 feet (3,400–3,700 m). In recreating the Hindu Kush mountain range that stretches between Afghanistan and Pakistan, the film crew shot at 10 separate locations in the national forest. Stunt coordinator and second unit director Kevin Scott was given the task of depicting the four Navy SEALs tumbling down rugged terrain with sixty-degree inclines. Scott did not choreograph the stunts, nor did he have the performers use wires or dummies; He instructed them to fall 15 to 20 feet (4.6–6.1 m) off cliffs and avoid looking at the ground until right before impact. Several stunt performers were injured after falling from the mountains, as the falls proved too difficult to control.

Production moved to Chilili, New Mexico for two weeks of filming. The location's wooded areas were used to film several battle scenes, and the art department built sets to create an Afghan village occupied by Ahmad Shah (Yousuf Azami) and his Taliban insurgents, as well as a Pashtun village where Luttrell (Mark Wahlberg) is rescued. Filming then moved to Kirtland Air Force Base in Albuquerque, New Mexico, which doubled for scenes set in Bagram Airfield, a U.S. military base in Afghanistan. The production then moved to soundstages at I-25 Studios in Albuquerque. The filmmakers occupied two 26,000-square-foot (2,400 m^{2}) stages in the facility for interior scenes and bluescreen work. The art department built the character Gulab's house, as well as interiors for Bagram Airfield's patrol base Camp Ouellette. The bluescreen work involved scenes depicting a CH-47 Chinook in a gimbal, and a 4-foot scale model of a Hindu Kush mountain cliff built by the art department team in Los Angeles. Principal photography concluded in November 2012, after 42 days of filming.

==== Cinematography ====
[Berg] wanted the audience to be as close to our characters and as close to the action as possible to experience the extreme circumstances our war heroes had to go through emotionally and physically.

— Tobias Schliessler (cinematographer)

Lone Survivor was director of photography Tobias Schliessler's fifth collaboration with Berg, as well as Berg's first film to be shot digitally. Schliessler intended to shoot the film with Arri Alexa cameras, but instead used Red Epic digital cameras with Fujinon and Angénieux lenses. He chose the Red Epic camera "due to its compact size and lightweight body."

For the film's visual style, Schliessler was influenced by British-American photojournalist Tim Hetherington's war photography book Infidel, which details a single U.S. platoon assigned to an outpost in the Korengal Valley during the war in Afghanistan. Prior to filming, Schleissler and Berg shot test footage with the digital cameras and brought it to digital colorist Stefan Sonnenfeld at post-production facility Company 3 for color grading.

The Santa Fe National Forest's rocky terrain and steep inclines proved difficult for conventional camera equipment—such as cranes and dollies—which resulted in much of the film's scenes being shot by the camera operators, who were rigged to aerial ski lifts above the action. "The location we picked was on top of the ski area above 12,000 feet in Santa Fe, and the high altitude made it extremely physically demanding", Schleissler explained. "All our equipment had to be hand-carried into some of our remote locations, which meant we had to limit ourselves to the bare minimum ... No one ever hiked to the set empty-handed, including our producers. It was one big team effort that made us a close film family."

Digital cinema post-production facility DeLuxe supplied the production with a 40-foot trailer, known as the EC3 (a joint venture between Company 3 and EFILM). The equipment enabled Schleissler to oversee every shot of the film in the EC3 trailer. He also collaborated with colorist Adrian Delude in changing the exposure for all cameras used which, according to Schliessler, "would have been more difficult when shooting on film." Company 3 carried out the digital intermediate.

==== Design and effects ====
To produce the many injuries received by the four-man SEAL team, the filmmakers recruited KNB Effects team Gregory Nicotero and Howard Berger. To aid Nicotero and Berger in recreating the injuries of the fallen servicemen, Berg provided autopsy reports of the deceased. Special effects supervisor Bruno van Zeebroeck created RPG explosions and bullet hits for the battle sequences that occur in the roads around Gulab's home.

Multiple branches of the United States Armed Forces supplied the production with military vehicles. The United States Air Force provided two Sikorsky HH-60 Pave Hawks from Kirtland Air Force Base, both of which were flown by military personnel and used to depict a combat search and rescue. The United States Army provided the production with two CH-47F Chinooks and two Boeing AH-64 Apaches from Fort Hood, Texas. The United States Marine Corps provided thirty Marine Corps reservists for scenes set in Bagram Airfield and Jalalabad. According to The Economist, Beretta paid the production company $250,000 to use their guns in the film in place of the Sig Sauer p226 and Kimber 1911s weapons actually used by SEAL teams.

==== Costume design ====
Costume designer Amy Stofsky ensured that the military wardrobe seen in the film reflected the 2005 time period. According to Stofsky, what the fallen servicemen wore back then is no longer current issue, as the United States Armed Forces stopped manufacturing the uniforms in 2006. While researching the time period, Stofsky met with the fallen servicemen's families, as well as Navy SEAL teammates. Stofsky and the wardrobe department collaborated with the Hollywood-based costume facility Western Costume to find the right fabric for the military uniforms. She and her team manufactured uniforms for the film's lead actors, extras, stunt and photo doubles, and military personnel who were also acting as extras. Stofksy noted that a total of "36 cookie cutter uniforms" were produced for Wahlberg.

In designing the costumes for the Pashtun people and Taliban forces, Stofsky aimed to create a visual distinction between the villagers and Taliban fighters. "Luttrell survived because of the age-old tradition of the Pashtun culture in providing hospitality and safety to those that enter their home", she explained. "We dyed the Taliban's costumes black, charcoal, wine, and indigo and kept the villagers light. Their humanity prevails. This is what we hoped to get across." Stofsky used a North Hollywood-based Afghan vendor, Moe Noorzai, for traditional Afghan clothing including vests, pants, dresses and Kashmir scarves. Stofsky also had a New Mexico-based tailor produce all of the turbans featured in the film.

Zarin Mohammad Rahimi, an Afghan refugee who fled to the United States to avoid the Taliban, and his sons, Muhammad Nawroz Rahimi and Nawaz Rahimi, were hired as technical advisors during production. The Rahimis collaborated with Stofsky, as well as the wardrobe and casting departments, to help them understand the language, customs and fighting methods of the Pashtun villagers and Taliban fighters. Zarin Mohammad Rahimi appeared in a minor but pivotal role as an elderly shepherd.

=== Post-production ===
==== Editing ====
Editing and post-production work took roughly seven months to complete. Colby Parker Jr. served as editor, having previously worked with Berg on editing Battleship. Parker spent six months editing the film at the Lantana Entertainment Media Campus in Santa Monica, California. The editorial department used four Avid Media Composer systems to edit the film. Parker edited the film during principal photography, but was not on location. "I like to blast through the footage to keep up with the camera. This way I can let [Berg] know if any extra coverage is needed", he explained. "Often I'll get word to the 1st [assistant director] and he'll sneak in extra shots if the schedule permits. Although I will have a first assembly when the production wraps, Peter will never sit though a complete viewing of that. He works in a very linear manner, so as we start to view a scene, if there's something that bothers him, we'll stop and address it."

The first cut of the film was two-and-a-half hours long. Parker then cut the film down to two hours when he realized there was a way to further trim the film. "There were a number of scenes that paced well when we intercut them rather than letting them play as written in a linear fashion. For instance, we wanted to let the mission briefing scene play normally—this is where the SEAL team is briefed on their target. That scene was followed by a scene of the target beheading a local. We realized that an actual briefing is very technical and rote, so intercutting these scenes helped keep the audience engaged."

Sound editing and mixing work took place at Todd Soundelux. Supervising sound editor Wylie Stateman recorded on-location sound during filming, placing microphones on the actors' backpacks and clothing "so [the viewers] would hear explosions and bullets going by as though [they] were with these guys as they were being attacked." In creating sound effects for the environment of each scene, Stateman relied on foley design, rather than traditional sound effects.

==== Visual effects ====
The two visual effects companies for the film were Industrial Light & Magic (ILM) and Image Engine, with overall supervision by Grady Cofer and Jesper Kjölsrud, respectively. In total, the film has over 400 visual effects shots. ILM was responsible only for creating a helicopter crash sequence in the film. Berg requested that the sequence be done by ILM, who had also worked on his previous film Battleship. Image Engine's effects work consisted mainly of set extensions and location enhancements; scenes were supplemented with computer-generated mountains, buildings and backgrounds, as well as muzzle flashes for firearms.

=== Music ===
The film's score was composed by Steve Jablonsky and American post-rock band Explosions in the Sky. Jablonsky said of the collaboration, "It was great. I didn't work directly with them because they're in Austin, Texas and I'm in L.A. I spoke to them on the phone and I think sixty, sixty‑five percent of the scores is them. We ended up doing our own things. We tried to not have two totally different sounding scores."

Berg said, "[Jablonsky] did the last reel; the band Explosions in the Sky did pretty much did everything else. They have an emotional, tender quality to their music, even when it gets aggressive. I didn't want the score to be overly aggressive, I wanted it to be haunting and emotional. Steve Jablonsky came in at the end to do something more traditional, but when Steve does "traditional", it's not the usual strings. He created a wonderful sound at the very end." The motion picture soundtrack album was released on December 17, 2013 by record label Metropolis Movie Music.

== Historical accuracy ==
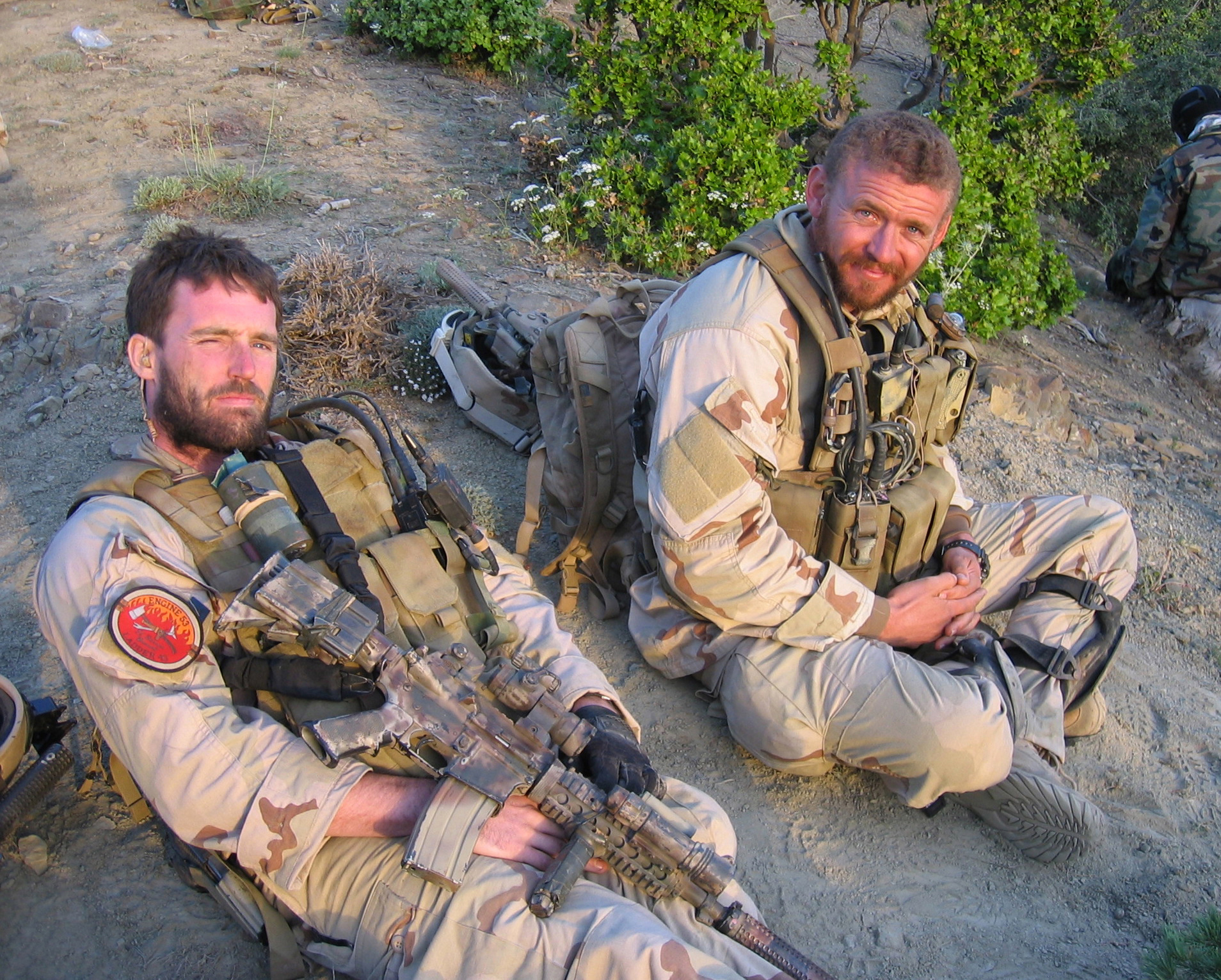
Michael Murphy (left) with Matthew Axelson, taken in Afghanistan

While the film was based on actual events, it has been noted that it contained a number of historical inaccuracies.

The number of Taliban fighters involved in the ambush has been widely disputed. In Marcus Luttrell's original after-action report, he stated that he and his teammates were attacked by 20–35 insurgents, while his book places the number at over 200. The screenplay describes "A solid line of at least fifty Taliban in firing positions on top of the hill above them." The summary of action for Lt. Murphy's posthumous Medal of Honor describes the enemy force as numbering "more than 50," while the official citation puts the number at "between 30 and 40 enemy fighters."

In his book, Victory Point: Operations Red Wings and Whalers – the Marine Corps' Battle for Freedom in Afghanistan, military journalist Ed Darack cites a military intelligence report stating the strength of the Taliban force to be 8–10. The military intelligence estimate cited by Darack is based on research sourced from intelligence reports, including aerial and eyewitness studies of the battlefield after the fact, including the men sent in to rescue Luttrell, as well as reports from Afghan intelligence.

The number of casualties sustained by the Taliban fighters has also been disputed. Naval Special Warfare Command has estimated that Luttrell and his teammates killed around thirty-five insurgents during the battle. Andrew MacMannis, a former Marine Colonel who was involved in planning Operation Red Wings and assisted in recovering bodies after the mission, has stated that there were no known enemy casualties. Mohammad Gulab, the Afghan villager who rescued Luttrell, agrees with MacMannis, as does another Marine who was involved with the mission, Patrick Kinser, who has said, "I've been at the location where [Luttrell] was ambushed multiple times. I've had Marines wounded there. I've been in enough firefights to know that when shit hits the fan, it's hard to know how many people are shooting at you. [But] there weren't 35 enemy fighters in all of the Korengal Valley [that day]." Furthermore, Gulab has claimed that he found Luttrell with eleven magazines of ammunition – the full amount that Luttrell had brought on the mission.

In the film, the four-man SEAL reconnaissance team is discovered by three goat herders—an elderly man and two teenage boys. In fact, Luttrell wrote in his book that only one of the goat herders was a teenage boy, not two. Luttrell's book and the film both suggest that the SEALs decision to release the goat herders led to their subsequent ambush - yet according to Gulab, people throughout the area heard the SEALs being dropped off by helicopter, and the Taliban proceeded to track the SEALs' footprints. Other villagers recounted to Gulab that the Taliban found the SEALs while the debate over the goat herders was taking place and that the Taliban then waited for a more opportune time to attack. Additionally, in the film Murphy makes the decision to let the herders go following a debate by the SEAL team. In the book however the decision to let them go was decided by a vote, with Luttrell and Murphy voting to let them go, Axelson voting to kill them, and Dietz abstaining.

The film shows Luttrell (Wahlberg) being able to walk after the Taliban's ambush on the four-man SEAL team. In reality, Luttrell explained that his legs were numb immediately after the ambush, and when feeling did return to them, the pain from the shrapnel in his legs made it too painful to walk; he had to crawl seven miles looking for water and sanctuary. Luttrell also said that he did not witness the MH-47 Chinook helicopter being shot down, as seen in the film. At the end of the film, the Pashtun villagers fight off a Taliban attack in a firefight that never actually happened. In reality, the Taliban fighters were outnumbered by the villagers and had no intentions of attacking the village. They did, however, enter the room where Luttrell was being kept and physically beat him, before being pressured to leave by the village elder. Luttrell also did not go into cardiac arrest after he was rescued, nor was he near death, as seen in the film.

In the film the MH-47 Chinook is shown getting shot down by a RPG-7. In reality the MH-47 Chinook was hit by what is believed to be an Igla MANPADS.

In his book, Luttrell claims that Ahmad Shah was "one of Osama bin Laden's closest associates". The film's production notes add to this mistake, calling Shah "a high-level al Qaeda operative". Shah was not actually a member of al Qaeda, nor did he know bin Laden. Rather, Shah was a local militia leader with ties to the Taliban. In the film, Shah is said to have killed twenty Marines in the week before Operation Red Wings. Although Shah did in fact participate in multiple attacks against U.S. forces prior to the events of Lone Survivor, there is no evidence to suggest that he had been responsible for the deaths of any American service members. Only five Marines had died in combat in the entire war up to that point, and only two U.S. service-members were killed in Kunar Province in the months leading up to Operation Red Wings.

== Release ==
=== Strategy ===
Berg first screened Lone Survivor to a number of professional American football teams to generate a strong word of mouth for the film. He expressed that the screenings were not a marketing ploy, explaining that it was "just a cool thing to do." Lone Survivor was screened to the Dallas Cowboys, Denver Broncos, Carolina Panthers, and Cleveland Browns as well as the University of Alabama Crimson Tide football team. The film received a generally positive response from several football players who took to social media to praise the film. A gala premiere screening of Lone Survivor was held during the AFI Film Festival at the TCL Chinese Theatre on November 12, 2013. Lone Survivor held its red carpet premiere on December 3, 2013, at the Ziegfeld Theatre in New York City, where the film received a standing ovation. The premiere also doubled as a tribute to the fallen servicemen of Operation Red Wings; in addition to several cast and crew members, Marcus Luttrell and family members of the deceased were in attendance. Mohammad Gulab, the Afghan villager who helped rescue Luttrell, also attended the premiere, marking his first time in New York City and in a movie theatre.

In what the film industry calls a "platform release", Lone Survivor was released in a small number of theaters before opening wide in other countries; it opened in New York and Los Angeles on December 25, 2013, before being released across North America on January 10, 2014. Entertainment One Films distributed the film in Canadian markets. Buena Vista International released it in the Philippines on January 8, 2014.

=== Box office ===
Lone Survivor's limited release in the United States saw it take $153,839—an average of $45,436 per theater—in its first five days. The film grossed an additional $326,685 on the following weekend. Pre-release tracking estimated that Lone Survivor would gross between $17 and $28 million during its opening weekend of wide release. Released to a total of 2,875 theaters in the United States and Canada, The film grossed $14,403,750 on its opening day, and by the end of its opening weekend it had grossed $38,231,471, securing the number-one position at the North American box office. Lone Survivor's opening-weekend gross made it the second-largest debut for any film released widely in January, after Cloverfield (2008), which opened with $40.1 million. It had also become the highest-grossing film among recent "post-9/11 war films", surpassing Brothers (2009), which ended its North American theatrical run with over $28.5 million.

The film saw a significant drop in attendance during its second weekend of wide release; it had earned $6,665,470, which was a 135.4% increase from its opening Friday. However, by the end of its second weekend, the film earned $25,929,570, a 41.7% overall decrease from the previous weekend. As a result, Lone Survivor went from first to second place behind the action-comedy film Ride Along. The film remained in second place during its third weekend, grossing an additional $12,900,960, which was a 41.5% decrease from its second weekend. It grossed an additional $7,096,330 during its fourth weekend, moving to fifth place in the top 10 rankings. Lone Survivor remained in fifth place during its fifth weekend, grossing an additional $5,565,860, which was a 21.6% decrease from the previous weekend. By its sixth weekend, the film went from fifth place to ninth, earning $4,086,435. By its seventh weekend, Lone Survivor had dropped out of the top ten, earning an additional $1,978,380. Lone Survivor completed its theatrical run in North America on April 10, 2014, after 107 days (15.3 weeks) of release.

Lone Survivor grossed $125,095,601 in the United States and Canada; coupled with its international take of $29,707,311, the film accumulated $154,802,912 in worldwide box office totals. Outside of North America, the film's biggest markets were in Australia, the United Kingdom, Spain, Japan, France, South Korea, and Germany; the film grossed approximately $3.5 million in Australia, $3.4 million in the United Kingdom, $2.5 million in Spain, $2.2 million in Japan, $1.5 million in France, $1.2 million in South Korea, and $1 million in Germany. In North America, Lone Survivor is the 24th-highest-grossing film of 2013, and the sixth-highest-grossing R-rated film of that year.

=== Home media ===
Lone Survivor was released on Blu-ray and DVD on June 3, 2014, by Universal Pictures Home Entertainment in the United States. On August 9, 2016, it had a 4K Ultra HD Blu-ray release in the United States and in the UK on September 26, 2016. In the United Kingdom, the film was released on both home video formats on June 9, 2014.

== Reception ==
=== Critical response ===
The defining trait of Lone Survivor—with respect to both its characters and Mr. Berg's approach to them—is professionalism. It is a modest, competent, effective movie, concerned above all with doing the job of explaining how the job was done.

— A. O. Scott of The New York Times

Review aggregation website Rotten Tomatoes sampled 227 reviews and gave the film an approval rating of 75%, with an average score of 6.60/10. The website's critical consensus reads, "A true account of military courage and survival, Lone Survivor wields enough visceral power to mitigate its heavy-handed jingoism." Another review aggregator, Metacritic, assigned the film a weighted average score of 60 out of 100, based on 44 reviews from mainstream critics, indicating to be "mixed or average" reviews. CinemaScore polls conducted during Lone Survivor's opening weekend of wide release reported that male and female audiences gave the film a rare "A+" (on an A+ to F scale), with exit polls showing that 57% of the audience was male, while 57% was at least 30 years of age or older. The Los Angeles Times reported the critics' consensus was that "the film succeeds in bringing the mission to life, although it avoids probing the deeper issues at hand."

Justin Chang, writing for Variety magazine, gave the film a positive review and called it "the most grueling and sustained American combat picture since Black Hawk Down, as well as a prime example of how impressive physical filmmaking can overcome even fundamental deficiencies in script and characterization." Alonso Duralde, writing for The Wrap, stated, "The film never makes a grand statement about whether or not the war in Afghanistan is, per se, a mistake, but it does portray war itself as a disgusting folly. Berg sets up the cathartic moments we're used to in movies like this, but then he pulls out the rug, reminding us that the cavalry doesn't always miraculously show up in time to save the day." Todd McCarthy, writing for The Hollywood Reporter, described the film as being "rugged, skilled, relentless, determined, narrow-minded and focused, everything that a soldier must be when his life is on the line," while Scott Bowles of USA Today called Lone Survivor "brutal, unrelenting and ultimately moving." Leonard Maltin described the film as "visceral", while praising Berg, the main actors, and the stunt performers for successfully reenacting the events of Operation Red Wings. Maltin concluded that the film "is a tough movie but a rewarding one. It's humbling to watch this dramatization of the sacrifices these men make, without hesitation. Peter Berg was determined to do justice to them, and he has succeeded." Betsy Sharkey, writing for The Los Angeles Times, praised the overall look of the film: "The production and costume designers have paid a great deal of attention to the details, from the uniforms and tribal robes, to the bullet wounds and blood. It certainly adds to the film's verisimilitude."

Several reviewers criticized Lone Survivor for focusing more on its action scenes than on characterization. In his review for The Star-Ledger, Stephen Whitty wrote, "This is the sort of bare-bones story that well served plenty of World War II movies once, and it would work here, if Berg had the sense to develop these men as characters, first. But we don't really get to know any of them, or what they might bring personally to this life-or-death emergency." Rafer Guzman of Newsday wrote, "The movie seems more concerned with military-style action than with telling us who these fallen heroes really were."

One of the film's strongest detractors was Time Out magazine's Keith Uhlich, who called the film "war porn of the highest order". Geoff Pevere wrote in his review for The Globe and Mail, "The sensation of being pinned down and shot apart is so harrowingly conveyed ... that one almost forgives the movie's failure to be quite as persuasive in almost every other respect." Film critic Steven Boone, writing for RogerEbert.com, compared the film's violence to that of Mel Gibson's 2004 film The Passion of the Christ: "What's in between amounts to The Passion of the Christ for U.S. servicemen: a bloody historic episode recounted mainly in images of hardy young men being ripped apart, at screeching volume. Though Berg's source material isn't the New Testament, he often handles Navy SEAL Marcus Luttrell's account ... with the thunderous reverence Mel Gibson brought to Christ's crucifixion and resurrection."

=== Accolades ===
Lone Survivor received various awards and nominations, in categories ranging from recognition of the film itself to its screenplay, direction, stunts, and sound editing, to the performance of its lead actor, Mark Wahlberg. Lone Survivor received two Academy Award nominations for Best Sound Editing and Best Sound Mixing, although the film failed to win either; at the 86th Academy Awards, the film lost in both categories to Gravity. In addition to the following list of awards and nominations, the film was named one of the ten best films of 2013 by the Las Vegas Film Critics Society, who also ranked it as the Best Action Film of 2013.

List of awards and nominations
Award	Category	Recipient(s)	Result
86th Academy Awards	Best Sound Editing	Wylie Stateman	Nominated
86th Academy Awards	Best Sound Mixing	Andy Koyama, Beau Borders and David Brownlow	Nominated
2013 Las Vegas Film Critics Society Awards	Best Action Film		Won
Cinema Audio Society Awards	Outstanding Achievement in Sound Mixing – Motion Picture – Live Action	David Brownlow, Andy Koyama, Beau Borders, Satoshi Mark Noguchi, Gregory Steele, Nerses Gezalyan	Nominated
19th Critics' Choice Awards	Best Action Film		Won
19th Critics' Choice Awards	Best Actor in an Action Movie	Mark Wahlberg	Won
20th Screen Actors Guild Awards	Best Stunt Ensemble in a Motion Picture		Won
Motion Picture Sound Editors Golden Reel Awards	Best Sound Editing: Sound Effects & Foley in a Feature Film	Wylie Stateman	Nominated
Motion Picture Sound Editors Golden Reel Awards	Best Sound Editing: Dialogue & ADR in a Feature Film	Wylie Stateman	Nominated
18th Satellite Awards	Best Adapted Screenplay	Peter Berg	Nominated
Writers Guild of America Awards	Best Adapted Screenplay	Peter Berg	Nominated
40th Saturn Awards	Best Action or Adventure Film		Nominated
40th Saturn Awards	Best Director	Peter Berg	Nominated
40th Saturn Awards	Best Make-up	Howard Berger, Janie Kelman and Peter Montagna	Nominated
2014 Teen Choice Awards	Choice Movie Actor: Action	Mark Wahlberg	Nominated

=== Effect on Mohammad Gulab ===
Mohammad Gulab, the Afghan villager who rescued Marcus Luttrell during Operation Red Wings, attended the movie's premiere in New York City. He also appeared with Luttrell on 60 Minutes and met the film's director, who thanked him for his actions.

Since Red Wings, Gulab had been targeted numerous times by the Taliban. After the success of Lone Survivor, with the Taliban having obtained bootleg copies of the movie, Taliban militants threatened Gulab further by phone. Soon after his return to Afghanistan, having rejected asylum in the United States on Luttrell's advice, the Taliban exploded a device in front of him, which Gulab survived. Gulab received a written threat from a local Taliban official. His home was stormed in 2014. While he and his family managed to defend it, threats on his life continued.

With the assistance of attorney Michael Wildes, Gulab and his family managed to board a flight from Kabul to New Delhi, India. After receiving American visas, they arrived in the United States in 2016 and now reside in Fort Worth, Texas.

== See also ==
- The 9th Company, a 2005 Russian war film
- Afghan Breakdown, a 1991 Russian war film
- Black Hawk Down, a 2001 American war film
- List of films featuring the United States Navy SEALs
- Survival film, about the film genre, with a list of related films
