= Tom Bellfort =

American sound editor

- Occupation: Sound editor
- Years active: 1983–Present

Tom Bellfort is a sound editor. He has done sound editing on over 80 films since 1983.

He was a member of Skywalker Sound, Saul Zaentz Film Center, and Soundelux.

== Filmography ==
Select titles Bellfort worked on at Skywalker Sound

- The Young Indiana Jones Chronicles (TV Show and movies) - Supervising Sound Editor
- The Terminator (remix) - Supervising Sound Editor
- XXX: State of the Union - Supervising Sound Editor
- Titanic - Supervising Sound Editor
- Star Wars: Episode I – The Phantom Menace - Supervising Sound Editor
- The Last Supper - Supervising Sound Editor
- Volcano - Supervising Sound Editor
- Frequency - Supervising Sound Editor
- Hart's War - Supervising Sound Editor
- The Recruit - Supervising Sound Editor

== Academy Award nominations ==
(Both are in Best Sound Editing)

- 70th Academy Awards- Titanic. Shared with Christopher Boyes. Won.
- 72nd Academy Awards-Nominated for Star Wars: Episode I – The Phantom Menace. Nomination shared with Ben Burtt. Lost to The Matrix.
