= Lon Bender =

American sound editor

- Born: Lon Ethan Bender; July 22, 1959 (age 66)
- Occupations: Supervising Sound Editor; Sound Designer
- Years active: 1977–present

Lon Ethan Bender (born July 22, 1959) is an American supervising sound editor, business executive and inventor. Bender won the Academy Award for Best Sound Effects Editing for his work on Braveheart (1995). He has been recognized for numerous other industry awards as well, including Oscar nominations for The Revenant (2015), Drive (2011) and Blood Diamond (2006). Bender is the co-founder of post production sound services company Soundelux.

While Bender is primarily known for his work on feature films, Bender has also provided sound design for a variety of commercials, created sonic branding for major corporations, and created the soundscape for Disney's Broadway production of Tarzan.

Bender is also an inventor and founder of several early-stage ventures, including companies that develop devices designed to assist individuals living with the effects of hearing loss.

A cycling enthusiast and a competitive race car driver, Bender resides in the Los Angeles area.

== Early life ==
Bender grew up in North Hollywood, California. He attended the Oakwood School, known for its progressive educational approach of process over product. While at the school, Bender was very engaged in the theater arts program, both as an actor and handling sound for many school productions. His cycling career began as a member of The North Hollywood Wheelman and raced in the mid-1970s, scoring 18 wins in 22 races in 1973. Growing up in the San Fernando Valley, Bender developed a childhood fascination with Drag Racing, which led to his purchasing his first car, a 1953 Austin Healey, in which he began his auto racing career. He won the 1985 Southern California E Production championship and went on to compete for many seasons in the IMSA Firestone Firehawk Endurance series. His greatest result was finishing second in the Camel GT Lights Prototype class at the 1992 24 Hours of Daytona.

== Career ==
In 1982, Bender teamed with Wylie Stateman to form Soundelux Entertainment Group. Bender and Statement explored numerous production, post-production and manufacturing opportunities. The company's audio publishing division created more than 100 books on tape. Later, a theme park systems and software unit was created, which would eventually rival Disney's Imagineering. The company produced and installed audio/video delivery and control systems to clients worldwide.

In 1995, Bender gained industry-wide recognition for his work as a supervising sound editor, receiving an Academy Award, and a British Academy Award for his efforts on Braveheart.

In 2000 Soundelux Entertainment group was acquired by Liberty Media. The SEG post sound entities were combined with those of ToddAO to form Ascent Media's Creative Sound Services Group. From 2000 through 2005 Bender served as its president, overseeing the integration and modernization of its facilities and integration of its administrative and creative staff.

In 2006, Bender returned exclusively to his creative roots, which started with the creation of a fully cinematic soundscape for the Broadway production of Tarzan, which is still running, currently in Hamburg, Germany.

Since then has been nominated for three Academy Awards for his work on Blood Diamond, Drive and The Revenant. Bender has embraced a workflow that blends Sound Design and Supervision with the sound mixing process in order to expand his creative team's effectiveness.

== Innovations ==
=== Advanced Data Encoding System (ADE) ===
In 1994, Bender received an Academy Award for Scientific/Technical Achievement for the development of the Advanced Data Encoding System (ADE), a technology designed to bridge the gap between linear film editing and non-linear sound editing. ADE represented a significant leap ahead in post-production. The system created a computerized edit decision list from the picture editor's workprint, which reduced the time and effort required to find the right sound take for the picture. Prior to ADE, sound editors would laboriously match a specific take of dialogue with the picture using a film code number and a code book containing the sound roll, scene and take number. The ADE matched an Apple computer with a modified audio film stock, which carried the traditional dialogue and sound magnetic stripe, plus a narrower stripe loaded with a SMPTE time code — the industry standard for tracking film or sound — and computer data.

=== Digital Foley System (DFS) ===
The Digital Foley System was conceived by Bender in 2002 as a result of his long-standing interest in expanding the art of Foley recording. The DFS system accepts input from the Foley Artist in the form of MIDI triggers, generated using pressure-sensitive foot controllers, integrating industry standard audio post-production tools with a custom software interface. This interface is one of two elements pivotal to the successful implementation of the device. The other element is an extensive sound library, recorded on a Foley stage with multiple shoe types and surfaces.

In development for two years, the DFS product was deployed for feature film work in 2004, first utilized on the feature films Johnson Family Vacation and Chronicles of Riddick. In 2006, the DFS product was used as part of the Academy Award-nominated sound editing work on Blood Diamond.

=== VocalStream ===
In 2007, Bender, along with Wylie Stateman, launched VocalStream, a technology solution for online delivery of customized content, which, when used in conjunction with AudioBlast, a client-branded Adobe Flash-based player, creates a delivery platform for multimedia content to web users.

== Notable Credits ==
2016

- Nocturnal Animals
- The Revenant

2015

- The Monk
- Netflix Sonic Signature

2014

- Pawn Sacrifice
- Lamborghini Huracán Project
- Winter's Tale

2013

- August: Osage County
- 2 Guns

2012

- The Hunger Games
- Drive

2008

- Defiance
- The Tale of Despereaux

2007

- The Bucket List

2006

- Blood Diamond

2004

- King Arthur
- The Butterfly Effect

2002

- We Were Soldiers

2001

- Shrek

2000

- Mission to Mars

1999

- Inspector Gadget

1998

- The Prince of Egypt
- Mulan

1996

- The Hunchback of Notre Dame

1995

- Pocahontas
- Braveheart

1994

- Legends of the Fall

1991

- L.A. Story

1989

- Glory

1987

- Planes, Trains & Automobiles
- The Princess Bride

1986

- Ferris Bueller's Day Off
- Stand By Me

== Notable Industry Recognition ==
| Year | Award | Category | Type | Title | Honorees |
|---|---|---|---|---|---|
| 2016 | Academy Award | Best Sound Editing | Nominated | The Revenant | Lon Bender, Martin Hernández |
| 2012 | Academy Award | Best Sound Editing | Nominated | Drive | Lon Bender, Victor Ray Ennis |
| 2007 | Academy Award | Best Sound Editing | Nominated | Blood Diamond | Lon Bender |
| 2002 | BAFTA Award | Best Sound | Nominated | Shrek | Lon Bender, Andy Nelson, Anna Behlmer, Wylie Stateman |
| 1996 | Academy Award | Best Sound Effects Editing | Won | Braveheart | Lon Bender, Per Hallberg |
| 1996 | BAFTA Award | Best Sound | Won | Braveheart | Lon Bender, Per Hallberg, Brian Simmons, Andy Nelson, Scott Millan and Anna Behlmer |
| 1993 | BAFTA Award | Best Sound | Nominated | The Last of the Mohicans | Lon Bender, Simon Kaye, Larry Kemp, Paul Massey, Doug Hemphill, Mark Smith and Chris Jenkins |
| 1985 | Emmy Award | Outstanding Film Sound Editing for a Limited Series or a Special | Nominated | Space | Lon Bender, Wylie Stateman, Terry Lynn Allen, David Bartlett, Jill Demby, John Duffy, Cameron Frankley, Avram D. Gold, Randy Kelley, Elliot Koretz, Bobbe Kurtz, Cliff Latimer, Mark P. Stoeckinger, Joseph A. Mayer, Stan Gilbert and Stephen M. Rowe |

== Videos ==
Bender on his Academy Award-nominated work on Drive

Bender on his work on The Hunger Games
