= Wylie Stateman =

American sound designer

- Born: November 20, 1957 (age 68); Long Island, New York, USA
- Occupations: Sound Director; Supervising Sound Editor; Sound Designer; Post Production Executive; Entrepreneur
- Years active: 1980–present

Wylie Stateman (born November 20, 1957) is an American sound director, supervising sound editor, sound designer, and post production media entrepreneur. Stateman has supervised over 150 sound projects, resulting in 9 Academy Award nominations, 6 BAFTA Awards, 3 Primetime Emmy Awards, and over 30 Motion Picture Sound Editor Awards. He also received a Science Technology award from the Academy of Motion Picture Arts and Sciences in 1994 for Audio Track’s Advanced Data Encoding (ADE) System. In 2021 he won an Emmy Award for his sound design in Netflix’s original series The Queen's Gambit.

His creative sound work has included multiple collaborations with Oliver Stone, John Hughes, Quentin Tarantino, Wolfgang Petersen, Herbert Ross, Cameron Crowe, Scott Frank, and Rob Marshall.

Stateman was a co-founder of the post production sound services company Soundelux where he served in a senior executive management capacity involved in the overall operations. Stateman also served as Chairman of the Board for the Soundelux Entertainment Group, a holding company that oversaw 11 entities including The Hollywood Edge (sound effect libraries), Modern Music (music editorial for feature films and television), DMG (computer game design), Mind’s Eye/Jabberwocky (books on tape), and Soundelux Florida (editorial), as well as Soundelux Systems (location-based entertainment systems integrator and installer), and Showorks (original content creator), among others.

Stateman went on to establish 247SND (twenty four seven sound), centered around a Dolby Atmos design studio in Topanga, CA.

== Early career influences ==
1977-78: Professor Mort Rosenfelt was a University of Utah Film School professor who taught Stateman at the very beginning of his career in Park City, UT. When Rosenfelt took a sabbatical from Sunn Classic Pictures, the largest independent producer of content outside of Hollywood during its time, to set up Sunn Classic's post production department and mentored 20 young filmmakers on in-house post production systems. He taught Stateman post production theory and a rapid prototyping approach to problem-solving, whereby students were forced to completely rethink different angles to solve the same problem.

In 1979, Lon Bender met Stateman at Warren Sound West in Hollywood, an early post production sound facility and recording studio. They worked together as young sound editors on a series of films including Coal Miner's Daughter, Wolfin, and Southern Comfort, while incubating their original idea for Soundelux. Their collaboration resulted in the successful development of many companies (identified below).

1982: Craig Harris was an early expert of the Synclavier manufactured by New England Digital Corporation. It was the very first digital synthesizer piano keyboard that performed computer digital audio sequencing. Harris introduced Stateman to the idea of doing digital sound design with music design tools.

1982: Harry Harris was a US importer who introduced to Hollywood the AMS (Advanced Music Systems) Audiofile, one of the first 16-bit hard disk based recording systems dedicated to post production. This tool was the first to move entire editorial works into the digital world. It enabled Stateman to apply his rapid prototyping curiosity and quickly transition from film-based analog creative to digital-based creative workflows on computer hard disks - an avant-garde concept at the time when the largest hard disk available was 180MB and had to be registered with the US government.

1982: Scott Gershin met Stateman during the post production period of Tron. Gershin introduced Stateman to a digital audio workstation called "ADAP", which ran on an Atari computer, a precursor to the personal computer. This exposure encouraged Stateman to further embrace digital audio as a means for creative audio exploration and solidified in his mind the mass market potential of these tools in reaching next generation PCs.

== Noteworthy collaborators ==
Stateman has had multiple collaborations with some of the most prolific writer/directors in the motion picture and television industry including:

Oliver Stone — Snowden, Savages, The Untold History of the United States, Wall Street: Money Never Sleeps, W., World Trade Center, Alexander, Any Given Sunday, Nixon, Natural Born Killers, Heaven & Earth, JFK, The Doors, Born on the Fourth of July, and Talk Radio.

John Hughes — Dennis the Menace, Home Alone 2: Lost in New York, Curly Sue, Dutch, Only the Lonely, Home Alone, National Lampoon's Christmas Vacation, Uncle Buck, She’s Having a Baby, Planes, Trains and Automobiles, and Ferris Bueller’s Day Off.

Quentin Tarantino — Once Upon a Time in Hollywood, The Hateful Eight, Django Unchained, Inglourious Basterds, Grindhouse: Death Proof, Kill Bill: Vol. 1, and Kill Bill: Vol. 2.

Wolfgang Petersen — Das Boot (American Director's Cut), The Perfect Storm, Air Force One, Outbreak, In the Line of Fire, Shattered, Troy, and Poseidon.

Herbert Ross — Steel Magnolias, Footloose, Protocol, Secret of My Success, and Dancers.

Cameron Crowe — Almost Famous and Jerry Maguire.

Scott Frank — A Walk Among the Tombstones and Godless.

Rob Marshall — Nine and Memoirs of a Geisha.

== Awards and nominations ==
Wylie Stateman has been nominated for 9 Academy Awards, 6 BAFTA Awards (1 win), more than 30 Motion Picture Sound Editors Awards (4 wins), 2 Emmy Awards, and two Satellite Awards.

=== Academy Awards ===
- 2020: Once Upon a Time in Hollywood (Best Sound Editing) – Nominated
- 2017: Deepwater Horizon (Best Sound Editing) – Nominated
- 2014: Lone Survivor (Best Sound Editing) – Nominated
- 2013: Django Unchained (Best Sound Editing) – Nominated
- 2010: Inglourious Basterds (Best Sound Editing) – Nominated
- 2009: Wanted (Best Sound Editing) – Nominated
- 2006: Memoirs of a Geisha (Best Sound Editing) – Nominated
- 1994: Cliffhanger (Best Sound Effects Editing) – Nominated
- 1990: Born on the Fourth of July (Best Sound) – Nominated

=== BAFTA Awards ===
- 2017: Deepwater Horizon (Best Sound) – Nominated
- 2013: Django Unchained (Best Sound) – Nominated
- 2004: Kill Bill: Vol. 1 (Best Sound) – Nominated
- 2002: Shrek (Best Sound) – Nominated
- 2001: The Perfect Storm (Best Sound) – Nominated
- 1993: JFK (Best Sound) – Won

=== Motion Picture Sound Editors - Golden Reel Award ===
- 2020: Once Upon a Time in Hollywood (Best Sound Editing – Sound Effects and Foley) – Nominated
- 2020: Once Upon a Time in Hollywood (Best Sound Editing – Dialogue and Automated Dialogue Replacement) – Nominated
- 2018: Godless (Best Sound Editing – Sound Effects and Foley) – Won
- 2017: Deepwater Horizon (Best Sound Editing – Sound Effects and Foley) – Nominated
- 2014: Lone Survivor (Best Sound Editing – Sound Effects and Foley) – Nominated
- 2014: Lone Survivor (Best Sound Editing – Dialogue and Automated Dialogue Replacement) – Nominated
- 2013: Django Unchained (Best Sound Editing – Sound Effects and Foley) – Nominated
- 2010: Inglourious Basterds (Best Sound Editing – Dialogue and Automated Dialogue Replacement) – Won
- 2009: Wanted (Best Sound Editing – Sound Effects and Foley) – Nominated
- 2007: World Trade Center (Best Sound Editing – Sound Effects and Foley) – Nominated
- 2007: World Trade Center (Best Sound Editing – Dialogue and Automated Dialogue Replacement) – Nominated
- 2006: Memoirs of a Geisha (Best Sound Editing – Dialogue and Automated Dialogue Replacement) – Won
- 2006: Memoirs of a Geisha (Best Sound Editing – Sound Effects and Foley) – Nominated
- 2005: Kill Bill: Vol. 2 (Best Sound Editing – Sound Effects and Foley) – Nominated
- 2005: Kill Bill: Vol. 2 (Best Sound Editing – Dialogue and Automated Dialogue Replacement) – Nominated
- 2005: Troy (Best Sound Editing in Foreign Features) – Nominated
- 2004: Kill Bill: Vol. 1 (Best Sound Editing – Sound Effects and Foley) – Nominated
- 2003: We Were Soldiers (Best Sound Editing – Sound Effects and Foley) – Nominated
- 2002: Shrek (Best Sound Editing - Animated Feature Film, Domestic and Foreign) – Nominated
- 2001: The Perfect Storm (Best Sound Editing – Sound Effects and Foley) – Nominated
- 2000: For Love of the Game (Best Sound Editing – Dialogue and Automated Dialogue Replacement) – Nominated
- 1990: Born on the Fourth of July (Best Sound Editing – Sound Effects) – Won

=== The Association of Motion Picture Sound (AMPS) ===
- 2017: Deepwater Horizon (Excellence in Sound for a Feature Film) – Nominated
- 2016: The Hateful Eight (Excellence in Sound for a Feature Film) – Nominated

=== Emmy Awards ===
- 2021: The Queen's Gambit: End Game (Outstanding Sound Editing for a Limited or Anthology Series, Movie or Special) – Won
- 2018: Godless: Homecoming (Outstanding Sound Editing for a Limited Series, Movie, or Special) – Nominated
- 1985: Space: Part 5 (Outstanding Film Sound Editing for a Limited Series or a Special) – Nominated

=== Satellite Awards ===
- 2020: Once Upon a Time in Hollywood (Best Sound) – Nominated
- 2004: Kill Bill: Vol. 1 (Best Sound) – Nominated

== Entrepreneur ==
In addition to his creative work, Stateman has been an active entrepreneur in sound-related businesses having founded, purchased, merged and/or managed over 30 corporate entities spanning post production services; sound effects libraries publishing; music post production services; video game post production; cinema facilities design, production and distribution; entertainment park design and production; software development for digital delivery systems; and more. Many of his endeavors were co-founded with his long-time partner, Lon Bender, as well as managed and/or developed alongside a team of executives who continue to serve as leaders of major Hollywood studios and post production facilities today.

- 1982: Soundelux: Soundelux became the most valuable independent audio post-production company in the entertainment industry. At its peak, the company generated more than $120M in revenue, managed over 500 employees, and operated facilities in Hollywood, San Francisco, Minneapolis, Orlando, and London.
- 1984: Audio Tracks: Founded by Stateman, Bender, and Kim Waugh, Audio Tracks focused on top quality 35mm transfers and sound reprints. The company developed a transfer process branded ADE (Advanced Data Encoding), a system that enabled film-based production processes to interface with digital-based post production processes. ADE was the first system to create computerized edit decision lists (CMX) from manually assembled 35mm picture editor work tracks and allow a 35mm picture editor’s work track to interface with electronic digital audio editing. The ADE System won an Academy of Motion Pictures and Sciences Academy Scientific and Technical Award in 1994.
- 1988: The Hollywood Edge: This company become known as the largest worldwide publisher and distributor of high-quality sound effects with a sound library that included over 75 multiple disc collections, 5,000 hours of content, 400,000 original tracks, and 5.5 million sound assets. The company was sold in 2014 during the Todd-Soundelux bankruptcy liquidation by Empire Investment Holdings.
- 1992: Soundelux Media Labs: Founded by Stateman, Bender and Scott Gershin, this company supplied sound design, voice over casting, and music composition to the interactive entertainment industry, with particular emphasis on video games, commercials, new media, and experience-based environments. The entity was later renamed Soundelux Design Music Group and ultimately merged with Pacific Ocean Post (POP Sound).
- 1992: Soundelux Showorks/Soundelux Systems: Founded by Stateman and Bender with John Miceli, Tony Miceli and David Kneupper, these entities existing under the umbrella company Soundelux Florida. With offices in Orlando, Hollywood, Burbank, and Las Vegas, the company offered full-service, turn-key solutions for attraction design and outfitting, as well as content production ranging from scripting, storyboarding, music jingle production, video production and show direction, and other creative services to clients spanning the US, Hong Kong, Japan, Holland, Korea, Spain, Mexico, Australia, and the Bahamas. The team earned more than 50 Addys, 2 International Monitor Awards, and 16 Telly Awards. Credits included sound for over 40 feature film and television projects, plus soundtracks for over 85 theme park and special venue attractions including T2-3D, Twister, Marvel Superheroes Islands of Adventure, Apollo/Saturn V, Sega GameWorks, All Star Cafe, The Land Before Time Adventure, and A day in the Park with Barney, among many others. Clients included Walt Disney, Universal Studios, Six Flags, Time Warner, Paramount, Levy Restaurants, Robert Earl’s Orlando Corporate Service, and other top names in the industry. The company launched a line of landmark audio/visual products under the name SMARTerminaltm and ADX, and received industry recognitions worldwide by such organizations as IAAPA, TEA, LDI and NSCA.
- 1992: The Mind's Eye/Jabberwocky Publishing: Stateman and Bender acquired "AVC", an entity known for its two primary assets: "Jabberwocky", a popular educational phoneme teaching tool; and "The Mind's Eye", a printed catalog company that sold American nostalgia gifts and best selling books-on-tape that reached millions of households. The company was later renamed Soundelux Audio Publishing and was ultimately sold.
- 1995: Soundelux Microphones: Founded by Stateman and Bender with David Bock, this company manufactured professional-grade microphones that were vintage in design and modern in technological advances. The hand-built microphones were world-renowned and noted for their ability to recreate the essence and sonic signature of the most popular vintage microphones of all time. Popular models such as the Soundelux U95, Soundelux 251, E47 and E49 can still be found in use today. The company was purchased by Liberty Media (later, Ascent Media Group) as part of the acquisition of Soundelux in 2000.
- 1995: Signet Soundelux Studios: Soundelux purchased Signet Sound, a Hollywood landmark facility known for producing over 50 gold records as Motown Hitsville Studios, which was owned by Berry Gordy. Many artists called it home including Lionel Richie, the Commodores, The Four Tops, and the Jackson Five. After updating the building and infrastructure, Soundelux opened Signet Soundelux Studios, an audio production and mix studio for Foley, automated dialogue replacement (ADR), music recording and mixing, sound design, sound editorial, and re-recording mixing for film and television. The facility housed four recording studios and eight edit bays. It provided sound services for films such as Good Will Hunting, The Sixth Sense, The Green Mile, Erin Brockovich, and The Incredibles.
- 1996: Soundelux Entertainment Group: The Soundelux Entertainment Group was a holding company that encompassed Soundelux Hollywood, Signet Soundelux Studios (formerly Motown Hitsville), Vine Street Studios, Modern Music, Soundelux Audio Publishing (books-on-tape), Soundelux Microphones, and The Hollywood Edge sound effects library, as well as Mind’s Eye/Jabberwocky, Soundelux Florida (editorial services), Soundelux Systems (location-based entertainment systems integrator and installer), Showorks (original content creator), and Media Technology Source. Ultimately, SEG was liquidated after the sale of Soundelux to Liberty Livewire.
- 1997: Vine Street Studios(VSS): Soundelux purchased Ryder Sound Services, widely considered to be the West Coast’s first independent sound facility founded in 1948 by Loren L. Ryder, a 5-time Oscar winner. The facility was the first to perform electronic sound editing on 17.5mm magnetic film stock, and the first studio to feature magnetic recording, consequently transitioning from optical recording during the re-recording process. Soundelux purchased the Ryder sound assets, invested in upgrading the infrastructure including the engagement of acoustician Jeff Cooperto who redesigned the mixing stages, and then reopened it as Vine Street Studios. After the renovation, the studio was given the Hollywood Decorative Arts Award, a distinction acknowledging the building’s architectural contribution to the city of Hollywood. The studio operated as a sound editorial and re-recording mixing facility, as well as R&D facility. VSS introduced workstation editorial systems as well as digital playback for dubbers. It was known for being the first to implement TASCAM MMR-8 and MMP-16 digital dubbers (serial numbers 001-008), a lead followed by the rest of the Hollywood post establishment. The company was sold in 2000, prior to the Liberty Livewire acquisition of Soundelux.
- 1998: Media Technology Source (MTS): Soundelux purchased for $30M MTS, a consultant and supplier to cinemas and other venues that used film, video, sound and other forms of communication for entertainment and business. With over 2,500 customers and 150 employees, MTS was the largest independently owned provider of cinema furnishings, equipment, and supplies in America. A Cinema Division managed new construction and renovation projects from architectural conception to project completion, while an Advanced Technology Division specialized in custom-built IT solutions. Based in Minnesota, the company also had a Caddy Products Division that was the world's largest designer and manufacturer of cup holders with more than 32 different models deployed across 30 countries in facilities as varied as movie theaters, ballparks, and grocery stores. The company experienced a major decline in sales after 9/11 and, additionally, was compromised after a foreign client reneged on $2M of shipped equipment. It was closed in 2002.
- 2000: Modern Music: Founded by Stateman and Bender with William Abbott and later Ken Karman, Modern Music provided feature film music editing services for high-profile projects and composers. Services included temporary soundtrack building and tracking; composer support during the writing process and music scoring sessions; music supervisor support for music pre-records and on-set music playback; support during mix down of scores; and preparation of music soundtrack releases. Modern Music editors worked with leading composers including Ennio Morricone, Alan Silvestri, Danny Elfman, Trevor Jones, Rachel Portman, and Cliff Eidelman. The studio's film credits included Forrest Gump, Ferngully: The Last Rainforest, Natural Born Killers, That thing You Do!, Mission Impossible, Star Trek: First Contact, Jerry Maquire, Waterworld, Get Shorty and Anastasia. The company was purchased by Liberty Media as part of the acquisition of the Soundelux in 2000. In 2008, the brand was revived by CSS Studios LLC and it continued operating until CSS was purchased by Empire Investment Holdings in 2013.
- 2000: Liberty Media: In June 2000, the financial holding company Liberty Media, purchased several media companies and merged them together under the name Liberty Livewire Audio. This merger resulted in the world’s leading independent provider of technical and creative sound services for the feature film, television, and advertising industries with sales reaching $253.13 million that same year. Liberty Livewire Audio's major operating subsidiaries included Todd-AO, 4MC, and Soundelux. The company provided a wide range of traditional audio and video post-production services, plus transmission, library, and audio/video distribution services to worldwide clients. At its peak, there were 3,500 employees and post production facilities in LA, New York, Atlanta, London, San Francisco, Singapore, and Barcelona.
- 2002: Ascent Capital Group (formerly Ascent Media Group): In November 2002, Liberty Livewire Audio was rebranded as Ascent Media Group. It was split into three divisions: Ascent Media Creative Sound Services(CSS) (i.e., Soundelux, Todd-AO, Riot, Company 3, Method, Encore, Level 3, and POP); Ascent Media Network Services; and Ascent Media Management Services. Ascent Media CSS was spun off from Discovery Holding Company in 2008.
- 2007: Vocalstream: Founded by Stateman and Bender with Hugh Waddell, Vocalstream was launched to pivot away from the analogue world of The Mind's Eye and endeavor to become early pioneers in the downloadable audio business. The company produced audio content provided by professional voice talent and then distributed it via client-branded digital audio players. Vocalstream competed with Audible, which had started around the same time and managed always to stay one step ahead. Consequently, the founders decided to exit the market completely by closing Vocalstream and selling The Mind’s Eye in 2009.
- 2008: Creative Sound Services: In November 2008, Ascent Media Group's Creative Sound Services group spun off from Discovery Holding Company to create CSS Studios, LLC, a wholly owned subsidiary of Discovery Communications. The group included the assets of Soundelux, Todd-AO, Sound One, POP Sound, Modern Music, Soundelux Design Music Group, and The Hollywood Edge, which then resumed marketing as their respective individual brand names.
- 2008: Store-Stream: Fueled by their experiences in audio content distribution, Stateman and Bender launched Store-Stream, an online services company that enabled consumers to create, store and send multimedia libraries via personalized, Internet-based media players. With offices in Hollywood, CA and Shenzhen, China, the company invested extensively in research and development while navigating the early challenges of digital media production, media uploading and downloading, media organization, and media streaming. The company bet heavily on Flash-based solutions and, in 2010, when Apple backed away from supporting that technology, Stateman and Bender decided to shut down the company.
- 2012: Todd Soundelux: In September 2012, Discovery Communications sold CSS Studios, LLC to Empire Investment Holdings (Empire) of Miami, FL. Empire attempted to reorganize the company by closing Sound One in NY and rebranding the group of assets as Todd-Soundelux in February 2013. An exodus of senior creative talent and burdensome real estate leases lead the company to file for Chapter 11 bankruptcy protection in May 2014. Todd-Soundelux closed permanently in July 2014. As part of the bankruptcy settlement, the court awarded Stateman ownership of all residual remaining intellectual property rights and interests to Todd-AO and Soundelux that were not directly awarded during the proceedings.
- 2014: 247SND (twenty four seven sound): Stateman continues his work in sound design and post production innovation, centered around a Dolby Atmos design studio in Topanga, CA.
