= Anna Behlmer =

American sound engineer

- Occupation: Re-recording mixer
- Years active: 1987–present

Anna Behlmer is an American re-recording mixer for film and television. She has been nominated for ten Academy Awards in the category Best Sound Mixing and is the first woman to be nominated in this category. She has worked on more than 120 films since 1987. Behlmer attended California State University, Northridge and was the recipient of the CAS Career Achievement Award in 2018.

== Selected filmography ==
- Braveheart (1995)
- Evita (1996)
- L.A. Confidential (1997)
- The Thin Red Line (1998)
- Moulin Rouge! (2001)
- Seabiscuit (2003)
- The Last Samurai (2003)
- War of the Worlds (2005)
- Blood Diamond (2006)
- Star Trek (2009)
