= Dave McMoyler =

- Other names: David McMoyler; David R. McMoyler
- Occupation: Sound editor
- Years active: 1987–present

Dave McMoyler is a sound editor who was nominated for an Academy Award during the 71st Academy Awards. He was nominated for Best Sound Editing for the film The Mask of Zorro.

He won two Emmy awards for sound editing for the miniseries Lonesome Dove and Son of the Morning Star.

Dave McMoyler is also a staff member of [Formosa Group]. He currently has over 90 credits.
