= List of accolades received by Slumdog Millionaire =

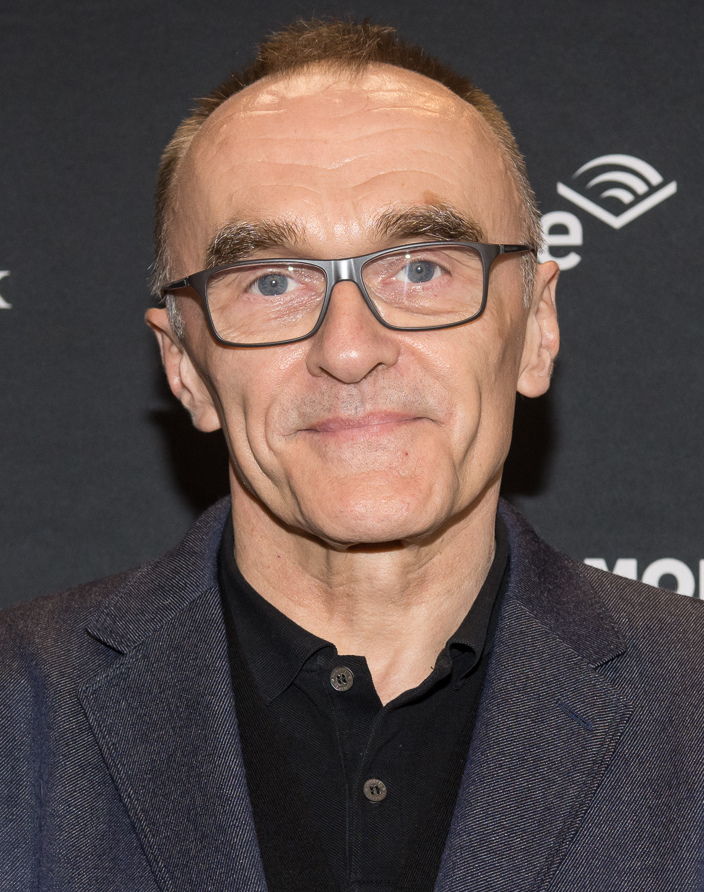
- Danny Boyle won several accolades for directing Slumdog Millionaire.
Accolades
Award	Wins	Nominations
AARP's Movies for Grownups Awards	1	1
Academy Awards	8	10
Alliance of Women Film Journalists	4	6
American Cinema Editors Awards	1	1
American Society of Cinematographers	1	1
Art Directors Guild Awards	0	1
Austin Film Critics Association	1	1
Austin Film Festival	1	1
Black Reel Awards	3	4
British Academy Film Awards	7	11
British Independent Film Awards	3	6
Camerimage	1	1
César Awards	0	1
Chicago Film Critics Association	4	6
Cinema Audio Society Awards	1	1
Costume Designers Guild Awards	1	1
Critics' Choice Movie Awards	5	6
Dallas–Fort Worth Film Critics Association	2	3
David di Donatello	1	1
Detroit Film Critics Society	2	3
Directors Guild of America Awards	1	1
European Film Awards	2	6
Evening Standard British Film Awards	1	3
Florida Film Critics Circle	3	3
Golden Eagle Award	1	1
Golden Globe Awards	4	4
Golden Reel Awards	1	2
Golden Globe Awards	1	1
Grammy Awards	2	2
Hollywood Critics Association Awards	4	7
Houston Film Critics Society	2	5
Humanitas Prize	1	1
London Film Critics' Circle	3	6
Los Angeles Film Critics Association	3	3
MTV Movie Awards	0	6
NAACP Image Awards	1	2
National Board of Review	3	3
National Society of Film Critics	1	1
New York Film Critics Circle Awards	1	3
New York Film Critics Online	5	5
Online Film Critics Society	1	7
Palm Springs International Film Festival	1	1
Producers Guild of America Award	1	1
Rotterdam International Film Festival	2	2
San Diego Film Critics Society	6	6
San Francisco Bay Area Film Critics Circle	1	6
Santa Barbara International Film Festival	1	1
Satellite Awards	1	8
Screen Actors Guild Awards	1	2
St. Louis Film Critics Association	2	6
St. Louis International Film Festival	1	1
Teen Choice Awards	0	6
Toronto International Film Festival	1	1
USC Scripter Award	1	1
Vancouver Film Critics Circle	0	1
Visual Effects Society	0	1
Washington D.C. Area Film Critics Association	4	4
World Soundtrack Awards	1	3
Writers Guild of America Awards	0	1
Young Artist Award	1	1

Totals (Note: Certain award groups do not simply award one winner. They acknowledge several different recipients, have runners-up, and have third place. Since this is a specific recognition and is different from losing an award, runner-up mentions are considered wins in this award tally. For simplification and to avoid errors, each award in this list has been presumed to have had a prior nomination.)
- Wins: 118
- Nominations: 175

Slumdog Millionaire is a 2008 British romantic drama film directed by Danny Boyle and written by Simon Beaufoy. It stars Dev Patel, Freida Pinto, Madhur Mittal, Anil Kapoor, and Irrfan Khan. Based on Vikas Swarup's 2005 novel Q & A, the film focuses on an 18-year old game show contestant named Jamal Malik (Patel). After being accused of cheating on Kaun Banega Crorepati, the Indian version of Who Wants to Be a Millionaire?, he recounts to the police how events in his life story enabled him to answer every question correctly. A. R. Rahman composed the film's musical score, while Anthony Dod Mantle and Chris Dickens were the cinematographer and film editor, respectively.

The film premiered on 30 August 2008 at the Telluride Film Festival in Colorado. It was then shown at the 2008 Toronto International Film Festival where it won the Toronto International Film Festival People's Choice Award. Fox Searchlight gave the film a limited release in ten cinemas in the United States on 12 November 2008. The film was given a wide release in the United Kingdom on 9 January 2009 and the United States on 23 January. The film earned a worldwide box office total of more than $378 million. Rotten Tomatoes, a review aggregator, surveyed 289 reviews and judged 91% to be positive.

The film garnered several awards and nominations with particular praise for Boyle's direction, Beaufoy's screenplay, Rahman's score, Mantle's cinematography, and Dicken's editing. The film garnered ten nominations at the 81st Academy Awards, and went on to win eight awards, including Best Picture, Best Director (Boyle), and Best Adapted Screenplay (Beaufoy). At the 62nd British Academy Film Awards, the film earned eleven nominations and won eight awards, including Best Film, Best Director, and Best Adapted Screenplay. The film won all four categories it was nominated in at the 66th Golden Globe Awards, including Best Motion Picture – Drama and Best Director.

At the 20th Producers Guild of America Awards, Slumdog Millionaire won for Best Theatrical Motion Picture. Boyle won Outstanding Directing – Feature Film at the 61st Directors Guild of America Awards, and Beaufoy won Best Adapted Screenplay at the 61st Writers Guild of America Awards. At the 15th Screen Actors Guild Awards, the film's cast won the award for Outstanding Performance by a Cast in a Motion Picture. The film received six nominations at the 14th Critics' Choice Awards and won five awards including Best Picture. In addition, the National Board of Review named it the Best Film of 2008.

== Accolades ==
List of accolades received by Slumdog Millionaire
Award	Date of ceremony	Category	Recipients	Result	Ref.
AARP Movies for Grownups Awards	March 2009	Best Director	Danny Boyle	Nominated	
Academy Awards	22 February 2009	Best Picture	Christian Colson	Won	
Academy Awards	22 February 2009	Best Director	Danny Boyle	Won	
Academy Awards	22 February 2009	Best Adapted Screenplay	Simon Beaufoy	Won	
Academy Awards	22 February 2009	Best Cinematography	Anthony Dod Mantle	Won	
Academy Awards	22 February 2009	Best Film Editing	Chris Dickens	Won	
Academy Awards	22 February 2009	Best Original Score	A. R. Rahman	Won	
Academy Awards	22 February 2009	Best Original Song	"Jai Ho" by A. R. Rahman and Gulzar	Won	
Academy Awards	22 February 2009	Best Original Song	"O Saya" by A. R. Rahman and M.I.A.	Nominated	
Academy Awards	22 February 2009	Best Sound Editing	Glenn Freemantle and Tom Sayers	Nominated	
Academy Awards	22 February 2009	Best Sound Mixing	Resul Pookutty, Richard Pryke, and Ian Tapp	Won	
Alliance of Women Film Journalists	15 December 2008	Best Film	Slumdog Millionaire	Won	
Alliance of Women Film Journalists	15 December 2008	Best Director	Danny Boyle	Won	
Alliance of Women Film Journalists	15 December 2008	Best Adapted Screenplay	Simon Beaufoy	Nominated	
Alliance of Women Film Journalists	15 December 2008	Unforgettable Moment Award	"Young Jamal jumps into the poop"	Won (Note: Tied with The Dark Knight for the Joker's first scene)	
Alliance of Women Film Journalists	15 December 2008	Unforgettable Moment Award	"Eye gouging"	Nominated	
Alliance of Women Film Journalists	15 December 2008	Cultural Crossover Award	Slumdog Millionaire	Won	
American Cinema Editors	15 February 2009	Best Edited Feature Film – Dramatic	Chris Dickens	Won	
American Society of Cinematographers	15 February 2009	Outstanding Cinematography in a Theatrical Release	Anthony Dod Mantle	Won	
Art Directors Guild	14 February 2009	Excellence in Production Design for a Contemporary Film	Mark Digby	Won	
Austin Film Festival	16 October 2008	Audience Award: Out of Competition Film	Simon Beaufoy and Danny Boyle	Won	
Austin Film Critics Association	16 December 2008	Top 10 Films	Slumdog Millionaire	2nd Place	
Black Reel Awards	15 December 2008	Best Actor	Dev Patel	Won	
Black Reel Awards	15 December 2008	Best Soundtrack	A. R. Rahman	Won	
Black Reel Awards	15 December 2008	Best Ensemble	Slumdog Millionaire	Nominated	
Black Reel Awards	15 December 2008	Breakthrough Performance	Dev Patel	Won	
Boston Society of Film Critics	14 December 2008	Best Picture	Slumdog Millionaire	Won (Note: Tied with WALL-E)	
Boston Society of Film Critics	14 December 2008	Best Film Editing	Chris Dickens	Won	
British Academy Film Awards	8 February 2009	Best Film	Christian Colson	Won	
British Academy Film Awards	8 February 2009	Best Director	Danny Boyle	Won	
British Academy Film Awards	8 February 2009	Best British Film	Slumdog Millionaire	Nominated	
British Academy Film Awards	8 February 2009	Best Adapted Screenplay	Simon Beaufoy	Won	
British Academy Film Awards	8 February 2009	Best Actor in a Leading Role	Dev Patel	Nominated	
British Academy Film Awards	8 February 2009	Best Actress in a Supporting Role	Freida Pinto	Nominated	
British Academy Film Awards	8 February 2009	Best Cinematography	Anthony Dod Mantle	Won	
British Academy Film Awards	8 February 2009	Best Editing	Chris Dickens	Won	
British Academy Film Awards	8 February 2009	Best Production Design	Michelle Day and Mark Digby	Nominated	
British Academy Film Awards	8 February 2009	Best Film Music	A. R. Rahman	Won	
British Academy Film Awards	8 February 2009	Best Sound	Glenn Freemantle, Resul Pookutty, Richard Pryke, Tom Sayers and Ian Tapp	Won	
British Independent Film Awards	30 November 2008	Best British Independent Film	Slumdog Millionaire	Won	
British Independent Film Awards	30 November 2008	Best Director	Danny Boyle	Won	
British Independent Film Awards	30 November 2008	Best Screenplay	Simon Beaufoy	Nominated	
British Independent Film Awards	30 November 2008	Best Technical Achievement in Cinematography	Anthony Dod Mantle	Nominated	
British Independent Film Awards	30 November 2008	Most Promising Newcomer	Dev Patel	Won	
British Independent Film Awards	30 November 2008	Most Promising Newcomer	Ayush Mahesh Khedekar	Nominated	
Camerimage	29 November 2008	Best Cinematography	Anthony Dod Mantle	Won	
César Awards	27 February 2010	Best Foreign Film	Danny Boyle	Nominated	
Chicago Film Critics Association	18 December 2008	Best Film	Slumdog Millionaire	Nominated	
Chicago Film Critics Association	18 December 2008	Best Director	Danny Boyle	Won	
Chicago Film Critics Association	18 December 2008	Best Adapted Screenplay	Simon Beaufoy	Won	
Chicago Film Critics Association	18 December 2008	Most Promising Performer	Dev Patel	Won	
Chicago Film Critics Association	18 December 2008	Best Cinematography	Anthony Dod Mantle	Nominated	
Chicago Film Critics Association	18 December 2008	Best Original Score	A. R. Rahman	Nominated	
Cinema Audio Society	14 February 2009	Outstanding Achievement in Sound Mixing for a Motion Picture – Live Action	Resul Pookutty, Richard Pryke, and Ian Tapp	Won	
Costume Designers Guild	17 February 2009	Excellence in Contemporary Film	Suttirat Anne Larlarb	Won	
Critics' Choice Awards	8 January 2009	Best Picture	Slumdog Millionaire	Won	
Critics' Choice Awards	8 January 2009	Best Director	Danny Boyle	Won	
Critics' Choice Awards	8 January 2009	Best Young Actor/Actress	Dev Patel	Won	
Critics' Choice Awards	8 January 2009	Best Writer	Simon Beaufoy	Won	
Critics' Choice Awards	8 January 2009	Best Composer	A. R. Rahman	Won	
Critics' Choice Awards	8 January 2009	Best Song	"Jai Ho"	Nominated	
Dallas–Fort Worth Film Critics Association	17 December 2008	Best Film	Slumdog Millionaire	Won	
Dallas–Fort Worth Film Critics Association	17 December 2008	Best Director	Danny Boyle	Won	
Dallas–Fort Worth Film Critics Association	17 December 2008	Best Screenplay	Simon Beaufoy	Runner-up	
David di Donatello	8 May 2009	Best Foreign Film	Slumdog Millionaire	Won	
Detroit Film Critics Society	19 December 2008	Best Film	Slumdog Millionaire	Won	
Detroit Film Critics Society	19 December 2008	Best Director	Danny Boyle	Won	
Detroit Film Critics Society	19 December 2008	Best Newcomer	Dev Patel	Nominated	
Directors Guild of America	31 January 2009	Outstanding Directing in a Feature Film	Danny Boyle	Won	
European Film Awards	12 December 2009	Best Film	Slumdog Millionaire	Nominated	
European Film Awards	12 December 2009	Best Director	Danny Boyle	Nominated	
European Film Awards	12 December 2009	Best Screenwriter	Simon Beaufoy	Nominated	
European Film Awards	12 December 2009	Best Actor	Dev Patel	Nominated	
European Film Awards	12 December 2009	Best Cinematographer	Anthony Dod Mantle	Won	
European Film Awards	12 December 2009	Audience Award	Danny Boyle	Won	
Evening Standard British Film Awards	1 February 2009	Best Director	Danny Boyle	Nominated	
Evening Standard British Film Awards	1 February 2009	Best Technical Achievement	Mark Digby	Won	
Evening Standard British Film Awards	1 February 2009	Most Promising Newcomer	Dev Patel	Nominated	
Florida Film Critics Circle	18 December 2008	Best Film	Slumdog Millionaire	Won	
Florida Film Critics Circle	18 December 2008	Best Director	Danny Boyle	Won	
Florida Film Critics Circle	18 December 2008	Best Adapted Screenplay	Simon Beaufoy	Won	
Golden Eagle Award	29 January 2010	Best Foreign Language Film	Slumdog Millionaire	Won	
Golden Globe Awards	11 January 2009	Best Drama Film	Slumdog Millionaire	Won	
Golden Globe Awards	11 January 2009	Best Director	Danny Boyle	Won	
Golden Globe Awards	11 January 2009	Best Screenplay	Simon Beaufoy	Won	
Golden Globe Awards	11 January 2009	Best Original Score	A. R. Rahman	Won	
Golden Reel Awards	21 February 2009	Best Sound Editing in a Foreign Feature Film	Hugo Adams, Niv Adiri, Peter Burgis, Ricky Butt, Gillian Dodders, Lee Herrick, Tom Sayers, and Jack Stew	Won	
Golden Reel Awards	21 February 2009	Outstanding Achievement in Sound Editing – Feature Underscore	Niv Adiri	Nominated	
Goya Awards	14 February 2010	Best European Film	Danny Boyle	Won	
Grammy Awards	8 February 2009	Best Soundtrack for a Motion Picture	Slumdog Millionaire: Music from the Motion Picture (A. R. Rahman, producer; Vivianne Chaix, P. A. Deepak, and H. Sridhar)	Won	
Grammy Awards	8 February 2009	Best Song Written for a Motion Picture	"Jai Ho" by Gulzar, A. R. Rahman, and Tanvi Shah	Won	
Houston Film Critics Society	17 December 2008	Best Director	Danny Boyle	Won	
Houston Film Critics Society	17 December 2008	Best Screenplay	Simon Beaufoy	Won	
Houston Film Critics Society	17 December 2008	Best Cinematography	Anthony Dod Mantle	Nominated	
Houston Film Critics Society	17 December 2008	Best Original Score	A. R. Rahman	Nominated	
Houston Film Critics Society	17 December 2008	Best Original Song	"Jai Ho"	Nominated	
Humanitas Prize	17 September 2009	Feature Film	Simon Beaufoy	Nominated	
London Film Critics' Circle	4 February 2009	British or Irish Film Of The Year	Slumdog Millionaire	Won	
London Film Critics' Circle	4 February 2009	Best Director Of The Year	Danny Boyle	Nominated	
London Film Critics' Circle	4 February 2009	British Director Of The Year	Danny Boyle	Won	
London Film Critics' Circle	4 February 2009	Screenwriter Of The Year	Simon Beaufoy	Won	
London Film Critics' Circle	4 February 2009	British Actor Of The Year	Dev Patel	Nominated	
London Film Critics' Circle	4 February 2009	Young British Performer Of The Year	Dev Patel	Nominated	
Los Angeles Film Critics Association	9 December 2008	Best Director	Danny Boyle	Won	
Los Angeles Film Critics Association	9 December 2008	Best Music	A. R. Rahman	Won	
Los Angeles Film Critics Association	9 December 2008	Best Cinematography	Anthony Dod Mantle	Runner-up	
MTV Movie Awards	31 May 2009	Best Film	Slumdog Millionaire	Nominated	
MTV Movie Awards	31 May 2009	Best Song From a Movie	"Jai Ho"	Nominated	
MTV Movie Awards	31 May 2009	Best Kiss	Dev Patel and Freida Pinto	Nominated	
MTV Movie Awards	31 May 2009	Best WTF Moment	Ayush Mahesh Khedekar	Nominated	
MTV Movie Awards	31 May 2009	Female Breakthrough Performance	Freida Pinto	Nominated	
MTV Movie Awards	31 May 2009	Male Breakthrough Performance	Dev Patel	Nominated	
NAACP Image Awards	12 February 2009	Outstanding Independent Motion Picture	Slumdog Millionaire	Won	
NAACP Image Awards	12 February 2009	Outstanding Supporting Actor in a Motion Picture	Dev Patel	Nominated	
National Board of Review	4 December 2008	Best Film	Slumdog Millionaire	Won	
National Board of Review	4 December 2008	Breakthrough Performance, Male	Dev Patel	Won	
National Board of Review	4 December 2008	Best Adapted Screenplay	Simon Beaufoy	Won	
National Society of Film Critics	5 January 2009	Best Cinematography	Anthony Dod Mantle	Won	
New York Film Critics Circle Awards	10 December 2008	Best Cinematographer	Anthony Dod Mantle	Won	
New York Film Critics Circle Awards	10 December 2008	Best Film	Slumdog Millionaire	3rd Place (Note: Tied with Happy-Go-Lucky)	
New York Film Critics Circle Awards	10 December 2008	Best Director	Danny Boyle	2nd Place	
New York Film Critics Online	15 December 2008	Best Picture	Slumdog Millionaire	Won	
New York Film Critics Online	15 December 2008	Best Director	Danny Boyle with Loveleen Tandan	Won	
New York Film Critics Online	15 December 2008	Best Cinematography	Anthony Dod Mantle	Won	
New York Film Critics Online	15 December 2008	Best Screenplay	Simon Beaufoy	Won	
New York Film Critics Online	15 December 2008	Best Music Score	A. R. Rahman	Won	
Online Film Critics Society Awards	19 January 2009	Best Picture	Christian Colson	Nominated	
Online Film Critics Society Awards	19 January 2009	Best Director	Danny Boyle	Nominated	
Online Film Critics Society Awards	19 January 2009	Best Adapted Screenplay	Simon Beaufoy	Nominated	
Online Film Critics Society Awards	19 January 2009	Best Editing	Chris Dickens	Won	
Online Film Critics Society Awards	19 January 2009	Best Cinematography	Anthony Dod Mantle	Nominated	
Online Film Critics Society Awards	19 January 2009	Best Original Score	A. R. Rahman	Nominated	
Online Film Critics Society Awards	19 January 2009	Best Breakthrough Performance	Dev Patel	Nominated	
Palm Springs International Film Festival	6 January 2009	Breakthrough Performance Award	Freida Pinto	Won	
Producers Guild of America	24 January 2009	Best Theatrical Picture	Christian Colson	Won	
Rotterdam International Film Festival	29 January 2009	Audience Award	Slumdog Millionaire	Won	
Rotterdam International Film Festival	29 January 2009	MovieZone Award	Slumdog Millionaire	Won	
San Diego Film Critics Society	15 December 2008	Best Film	Slumdog Millionaire	Won	
San Diego Film Critics Society	15 December 2008	Best Director	Danny Boyle	Won	
San Diego Film Critics Society	15 December 2008	Best Adapted Screenplay	Simon Beaufoy	Won	
San Diego Film Critics Society	15 December 2008	Best Cinematography	Anthony Dod Mantle	Won	
San Diego Film Critics Society	15 December 2008	Best Editing	Chris Dickens	Won	
San Diego Film Critics Society	15 December 2008	Best Music Score	A. R. Rahman	Won	
Santa Barbara International Film Festival	22 January – 1 February 2009	Outstanding Director of the Year	Danny Boyle	Won	
Satellite Awards	14 December 2008	Best Drama Film	Slumdog Millionaire	Won	
Satellite Awards	14 December 2008	Best Director	Danny Boyle	Won	
Satellite Awards	14 December 2008	Best Adapted Screenplay	Simon Beaufoy	Nominated	
Satellite Awards	14 December 2008	Best Editing	Chris Dickens	Nominated	
Satellite Awards	14 December 2008	Best Original Score	A. R. Rahman	Won	
Satellite Awards	14 December 2008	Best Original Song	"Jai Ho"	Nominated	
Screen Actors Guild	25 January 2009	Outstanding Performance by a Male Actor in a Supporting Role	Dev Patel	Nominated	
Screen Actors Guild	25 January 2009	Outstanding Performance by a Cast in a Motion Picture	Rubina Ali, Tanay Hemant Chheda, Ashutosh Lobo Gajiwala, Azharuddin Mohammed Ismail, Anil Kapoor, Irrfan Khan, Ayush Mahesh Khedekar, Tanvi Ganesh Lonkar, Madhur Mittal, Dev Patel, Freida Pinto	Won	
St. Louis Gateway Film Critics Association	15 December 2008	Best Picture	Slumdog Millionaire	Nominated	
St. Louis Gateway Film Critics Association	15 December 2008	Best Foreign Language Film	Slumdog Millionaire	Won	
St. Louis Gateway Film Critics Association	15 December 2008	Most Original, Creative or Innovative Film	Slumdog Millionaire	Nominated	
St. Louis Gateway Film Critics Association	15 December 2008	Best Director	Danny Boyle	Won	
St. Louis Gateway Film Critics Association	15 December 2008	Best Screenplay	Simon Beaufoy	Nominated	
St. Louis Gateway Film Critics Association	15 December 2008	Best Cinematography	Anthony Dod Mantle	Nominated	
St. Louis International Film Festival	13 November 2008	Best International Feature	Slumdog Millionaire	Won	
Teen Choice Awards	August 9, 2009	Choice Movie - Drama	Slumdog Millionaire	Nominated	
Teen Choice Awards	August 9, 2009	Choice Movie Actor – Drama	Dev Patel	Nominated	
Teen Choice Awards	August 9, 2009	Choice Movie Actress – Drama	Freida Pinto	Nominated	
Teen Choice Awards	August 9, 2009	Choice Movie – Female Fresh Face	Freida Pinto	Nominated	
Teen Choice Awards	August 9, 2009	Choice Movie – Male Fresh Face	Dev Patel	Nominated	
Teen Choice Awards	August 9, 2009	Choice Movie Liplock	Dev Patel and Freida Pinto	Nominated	
Toronto International Film Festival	4 September 2008	People's Choice Award	Danny Boyle	Won	
USC Scripter Award	30 January 2009	Best Screenplay	Simon Beaufoy	Won	
Vancouver Film Critics Circle	13 January 2009	Best Film	Slumdog Millionaire	Nominated	
Vancouver Film Critics Circle	13 January 2009	Best Director	Danny Boyle	Nominated	
Washington D.C. Area Film Critics Association	7 December 2008	Best Film	Slumdog Millionaire	Won	
Washington D.C. Area Film Critics Association	7 December 2008	Best Director	Danny Boyle	Won	
Washington D.C. Area Film Critics Association	7 December 2008	Best Breakthrough Performance	Dev Patel	Won	
Washington D.C. Area Film Critics Association	7 December 2008	Best Adapted Screenplay	Simon Beaufoy	Won	
World Soundtrack Awards	17 October 2009	Best Original Song Written for a Film	"Jai Ho" by A. R. Rahman, Gulzar, and Tanvi Shah	Won	
World Soundtrack Awards	17 October 2009	Best Original Song Written for a Film	"O Saya" by A. R. Rahman and Mathangi Arulpragasam	Nominated	
World Soundtrack Awards	17 October 2009	Best Original Score of the Year	A. R. Rahman	Nominated	
Writers Guild of America	7 February 2009	Best Adapted Screenplay	Simon Beaufoy	Won	
Young Artist Award	29 March 2009	Outstanding International Feature Film Ensemble	Slumdog Millionaire	Won	

== See also ==
- 2008 in film
