= 62nd British Academy Film Awards =

2009 film award ceremony

- Date: 8 February 2009
- Site: Royal Opera House, Covent Garden, London
- Hosted by: Jonathan Ross

Highlights
- Best Film: Slumdog Millionaire
- Best British Film: Man on Wire
- Best Actor: Mickey Rourke; The Wrestler
- Best Actress: Kate Winslet; The Reader
- Most awards: Slumdog Millionaire (7)
- Most nominations: The Curious Case of Benjamin Button and Slumdog Millionaire (11)

The 62nd British Academy Film Awards, more commonly known as the BAFTAs, took place on 8 February 2009 at the Royal Albert Hall in London, honouring the best national and foreign films of 2008. Presented by the British Academy of Film and Television Arts, accolades were handed out for the best feature-length film and documentaries of any nationality that were screened at British cinemas in 2008.

The nominees were announced on 15 January 2009. Two films received the most nominations in eleven categories; The Curious Case of Benjamin Button and Slumdog Millionaire. The Dark Knight followed with nine. Slumdog Millionaire took home the most awards with seven.

Jonathan Ross hosted the ceremony for the third consecutive year.

== Winners and nominees ==
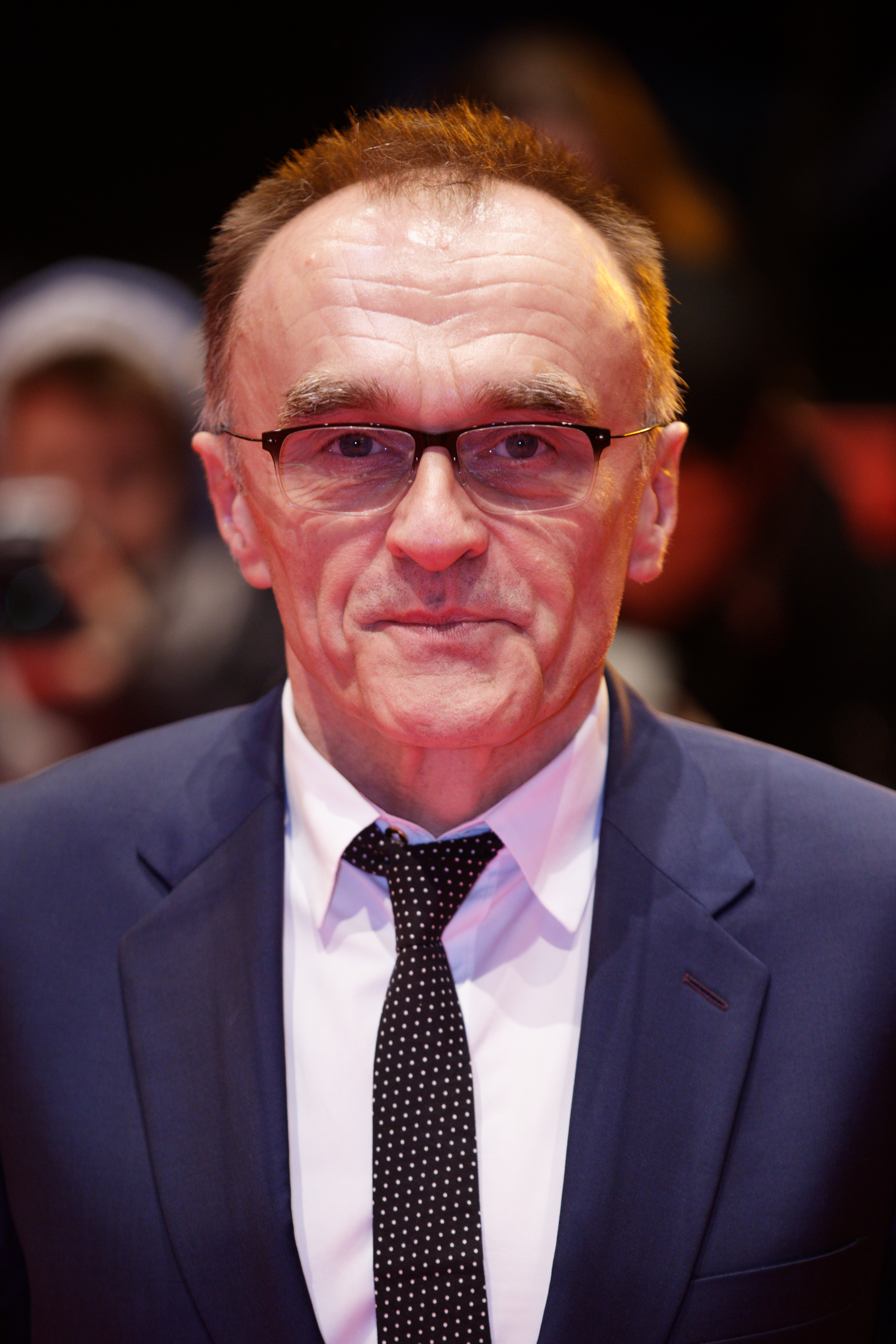
Danny Boyle, Best Director winner

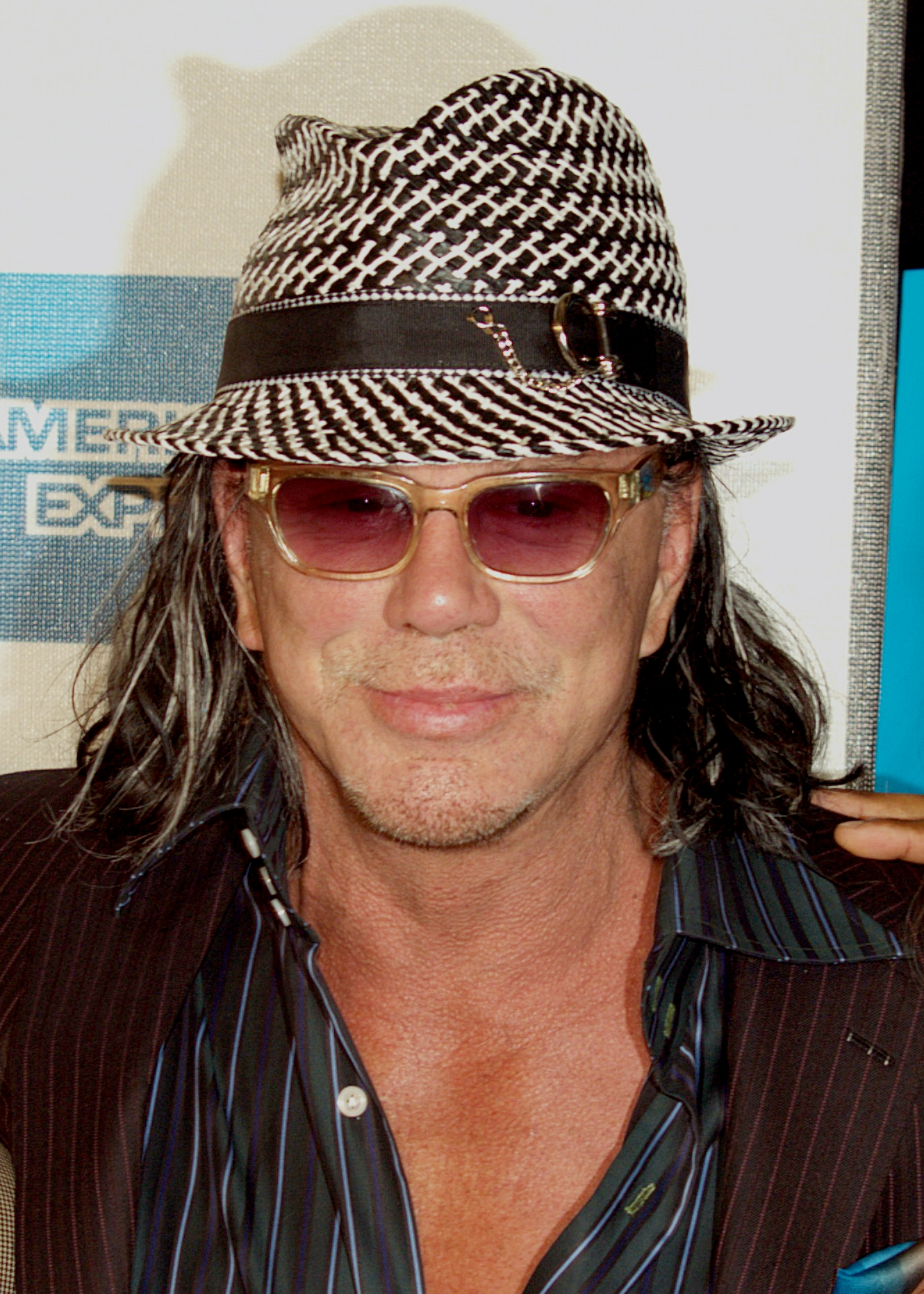
Mickey Rourke, Best Actor winner

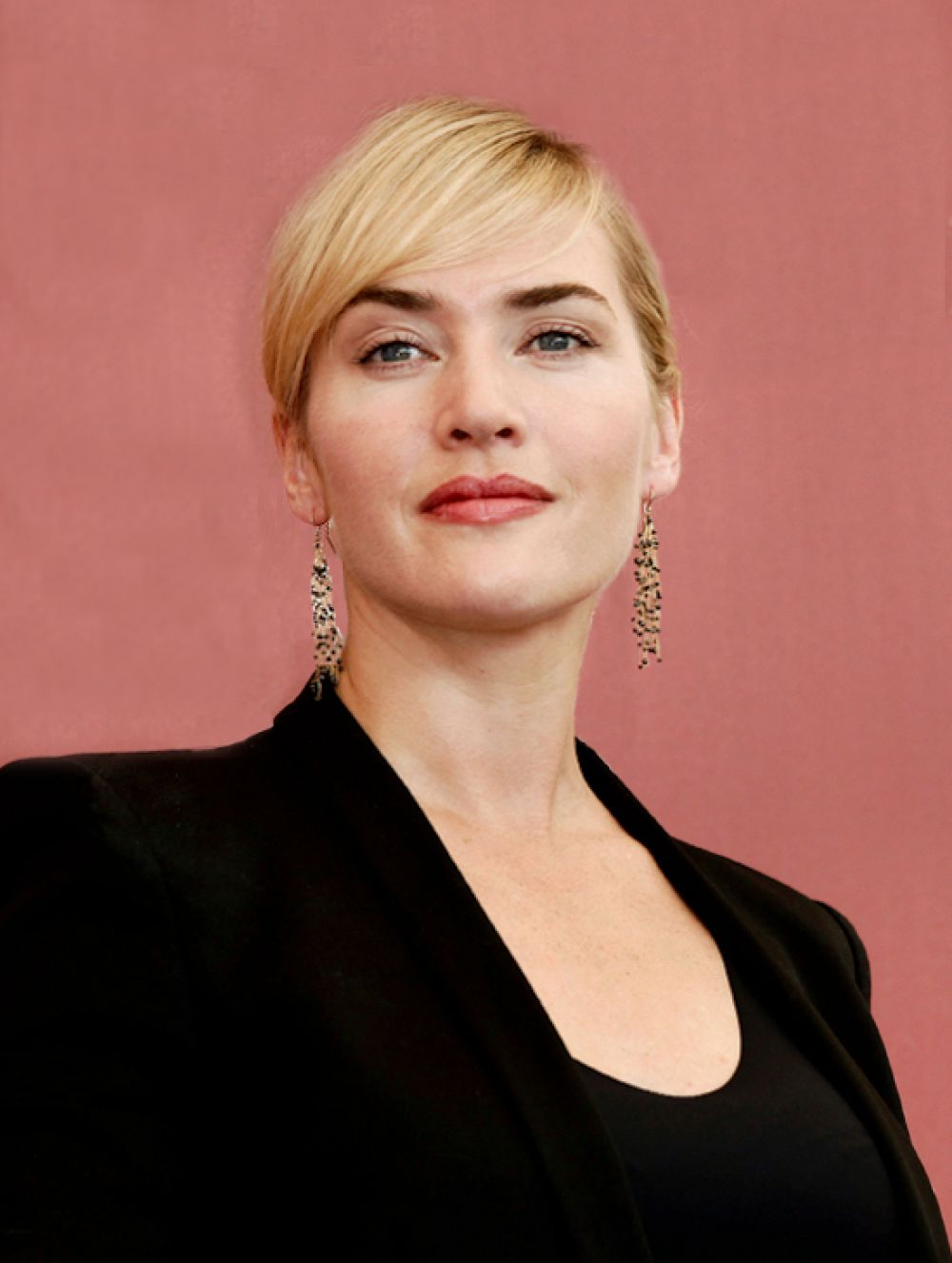
Kate Winslet, Best Actress winner

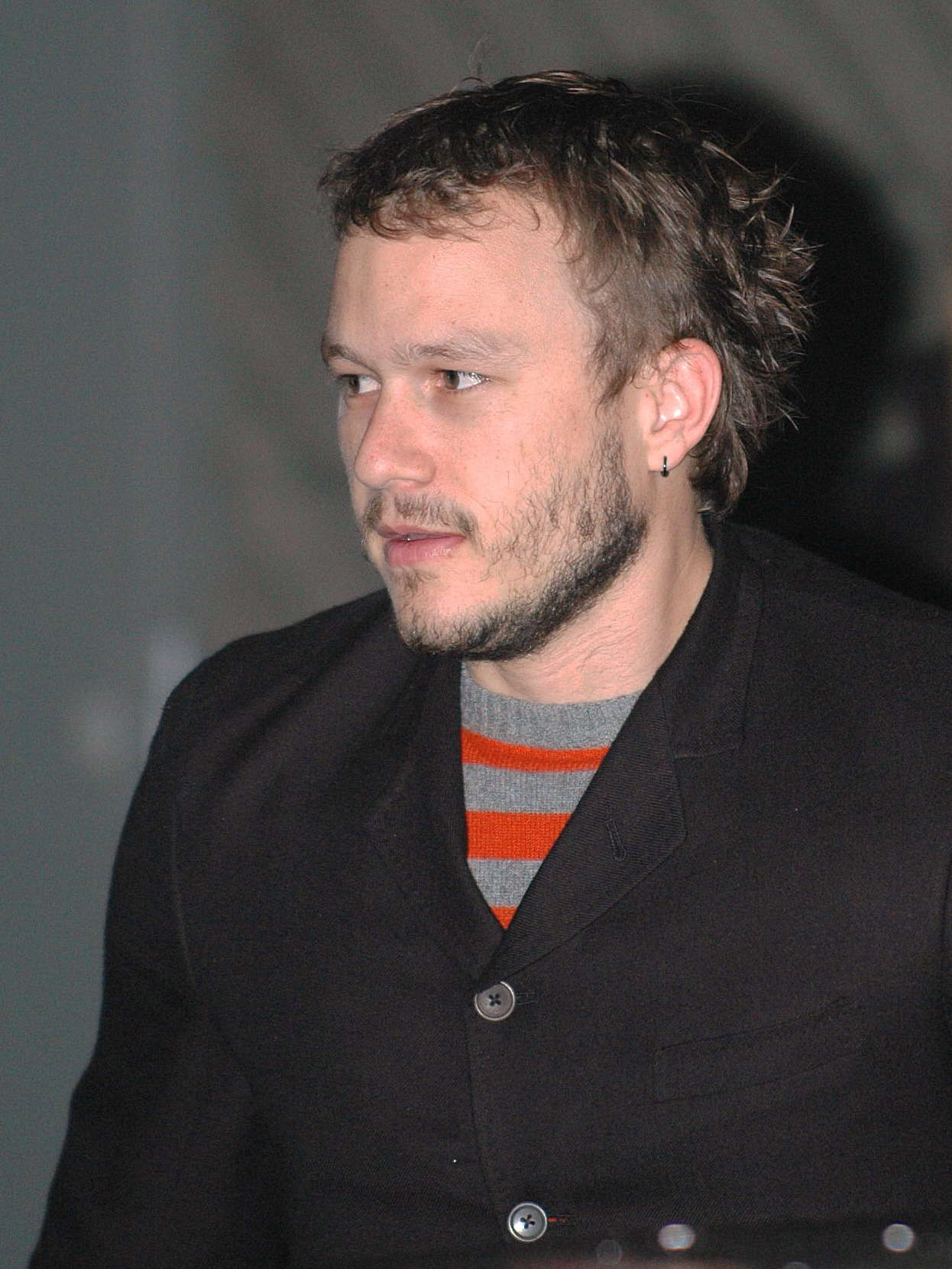
Heath Ledger, Best Supporting Actor winner

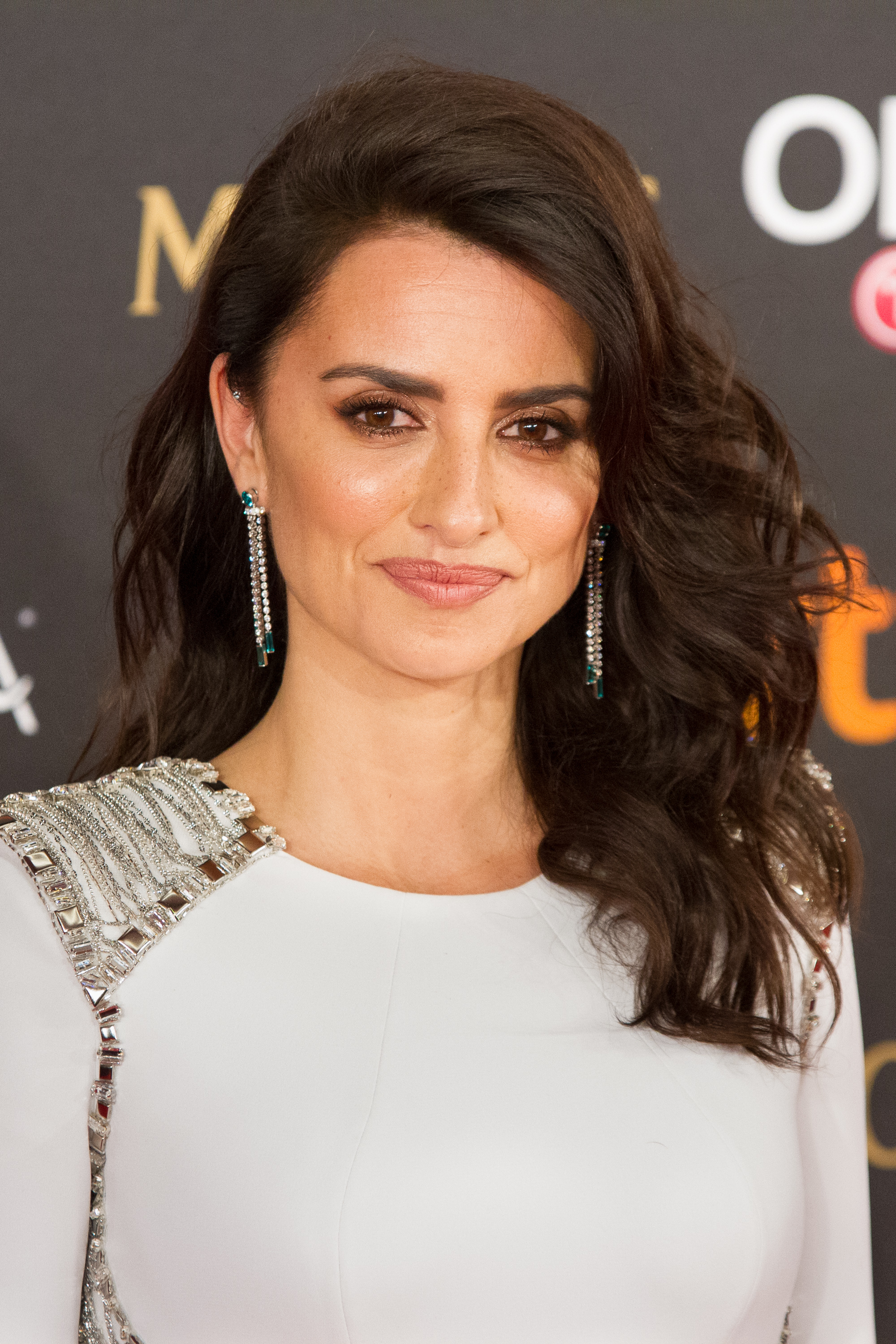
Penélope Cruz, Best Supporting Actress winner

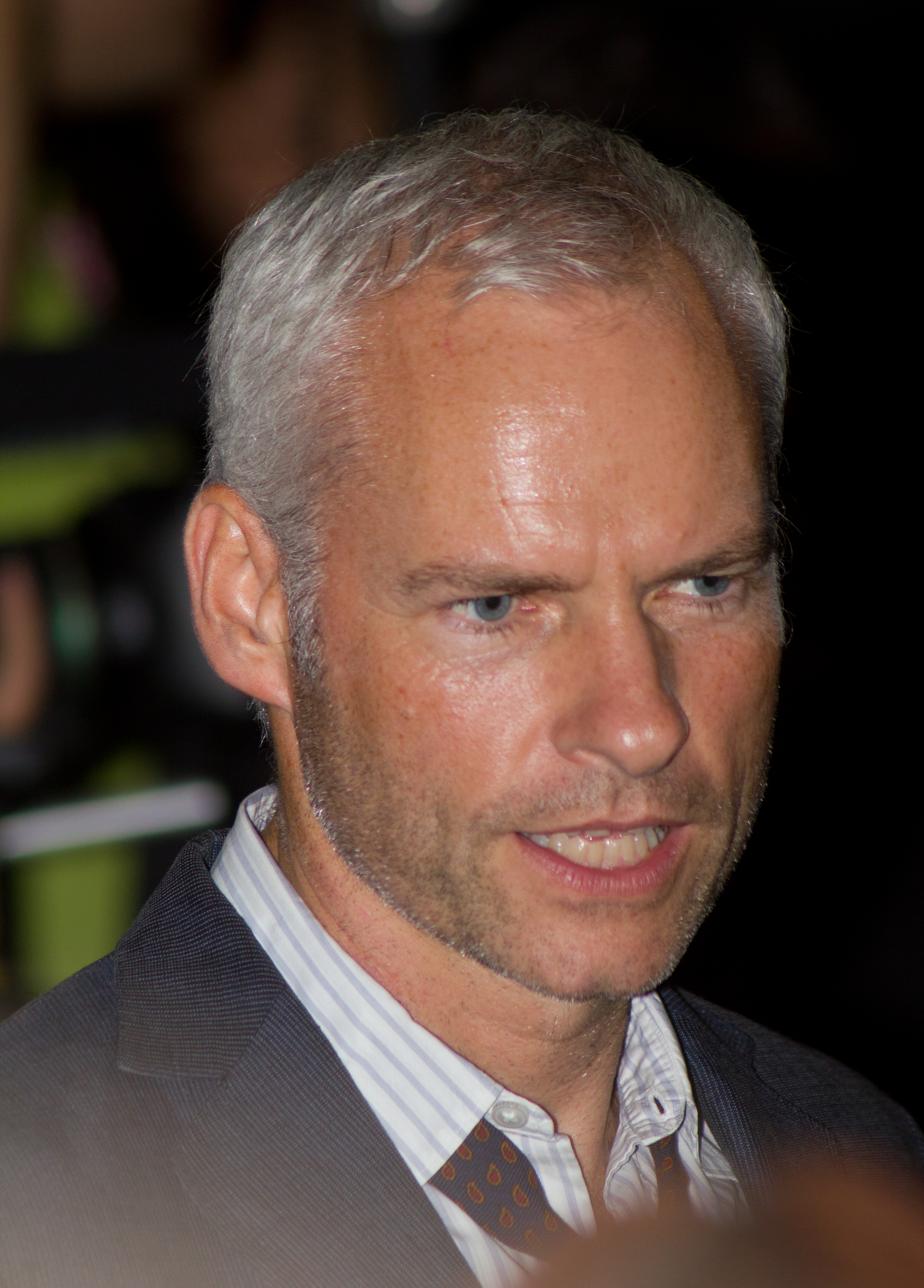
Martin McDonagh, Best Original Screenplay winner

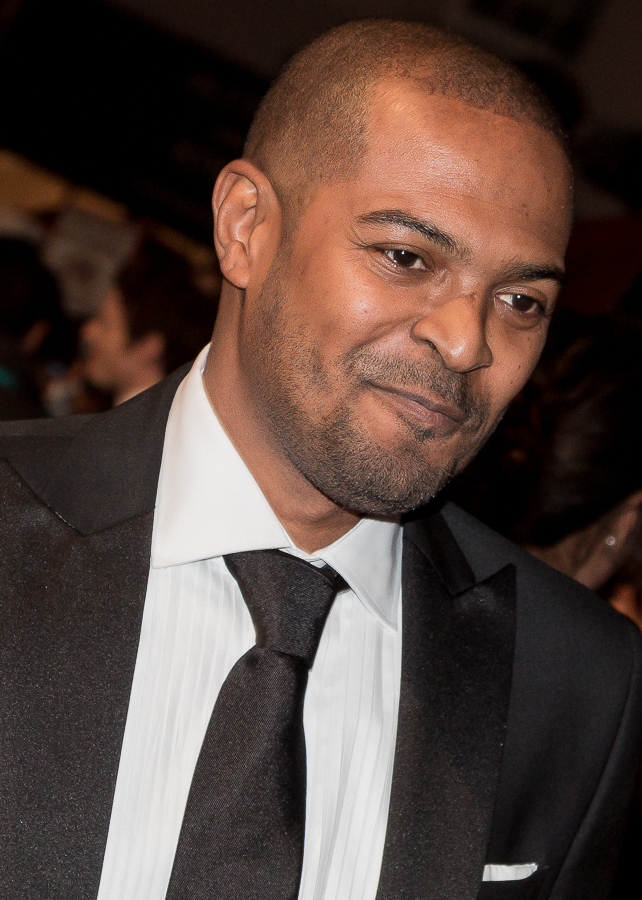
Noel Clarke, Orange Rising Star Award winner

=== BAFTA Fellowship ===
- **Terry Gilliam**

=== Outstanding British Contribution to Cinema ===
- **Pinewood Studios** and **Shepperton Studios**

=== Awards ===
Winners are listed first and highlighted in boldface.

**Best Film**: **Slumdog Millionaire – Christian Colson**; The Curious Case of Benjamin Button – Kathleen Kennedy, Frank Marshall and Ceán Chaffin; Frost/Nixon – Tim Bevan, Eric Fellner, Brian Grazer and Ron Howard; Milk – Dan Jinks and Bruce Cohen; The Reader – Anthony Minghella, Sydney Pollack, Donna Gigliotti and Redmond Morris	**Best Direction**: **Danny Boyle – Slumdog Millionaire**; Stephen Daldry – The Reader; Clint Eastwood – Changeling; David Fincher – The Curious Case of Benjamin Button; Ron Howard – Frost/Nixon
**Best Actor in a Leading Role**: **Mickey Rourke – The Wrestler as Robin Ramzinski/Randy Robinson**; Frank Langella – Frost/Nixon as Richard Nixon; Dev Patel – Slumdog Millionaire as Jamal Malik; Sean Penn – Milk as Harvey Milk; Brad Pitt – The Curious Case of Benjamin Button as Benjamin Button	**Best Actress in a Leading Role**: **Kate Winslet – The Reader as Hanna Schmitz**; Angelina Jolie – Changeling as Christine Collins; Kristin Scott Thomas – I've Loved You So Long as Juliette Fontaine; Meryl Streep – Doubt as Sister Aloysius Beauvier; Kate Winslet – Revolutionary Road as April Wheeler
**Best Actor in a Supporting Role**: **Heath Ledger – The Dark Knight as Joker**; Robert Downey Jr. – Tropic Thunder as Kirk Lazarus; Brendan Gleeson – In Bruges as Ken Daley; Philip Seymour Hoffman – Doubt as Father Brendan Flynn; Brad Pitt – Burn After Reading as Chad Feldheimer	**Best Actress in a Supporting Role**: **Penélope Cruz – Vicky Cristina Barcelona as Maria Elena**; Amy Adams – Doubt as Sister James; Freida Pinto – Slumdog Millionaire as Latika; Tilda Swinton – Burn After Reading as Katie Cox; Marisa Tomei – The Wrestler as Pam/Cassidy
**Best Original Screenplay**: **In Bruges – Martin McDonagh**; Burn After Reading – Joel Coen and Ethan Coen; Changeling – J. Michael Straczynski; I've Loved You So Long – Philippe Claudel; Milk – Dustin Lance Black	**Best Adapted Screenplay**: **Slumdog Millionaire – Simon Beaufoy**; The Curious Case of Benjamin Button – Eric Roth; Frost/Nixon – Peter Morgan; The Reader – David Hare (playwright); Revolutionary Road – Justin Haythe
**Best Cinematography**: **Slumdog Millionaire – Anthony Dod Mantle**; Changeling – Tom Stern; The Curious Case of Benjamin Button – Claudio Miranda; The Dark Knight – Wally Pfister; The Reader – Chris Menges and Roger Deakins	**Best Costume Design**: **The Duchess – Michael O'Connor**; Changeling – Deborah Hopper; The Curious Case of Benjamin Button – Jacqueline West; The Dark Knight – Lindy Hemming; Revolutionary Road – Albert Wolsky
**Best Editing**: **Slumdog Millionaire – Chris Dickens**; Changeling – Joel Cox and Gary D. Roach; The Curious Case of Benjamin Button – Kirk Baxter and Angus Wall; The Dark Knight – Lee Smith; Frost/Nixon – Mike Hill and Daniel P. Hanley; In Bruges – Jon Gregory	**Best Makeup and Hair**: **The Curious Case of Benjamin Button – Jean Ann Black and Colleen Callaghan**; The Dark Knight – Peter King; The Duchess – Daniel Phillips and Jan Archibald; Frost/Nixon – Edouard F. Henriques and Kim Santantonio; Milk – Steven E. Anderson and Michael White
**Best Original Music**: **Slumdog Millionaire – A. R. Rahman**; The Curious Case of Benjamin Button – Alexandre Desplat; The Dark Knight – Hans Zimmer and James Newton Howard; Mamma Mia! – Benny Andersson and Björn Ulvaeus; WALL-E – Thomas Newman	**Best Production Design**: **The Curious Case of Benjamin Button – Donald Graham Burt and Victor J. Zolfo**; Changeling – James J. Murakami and Gary Fettis; The Dark Knight – Nathan Crowley and Peter Lando; Revolutionary Road – Kristi Zea and Debra Schutt; Slumdog Millionaire – Mark Digby and Michelle Day
**Best Sound**: **Slumdog Millionaire – Glenn Freemantle, Resul Pookutty, Richard Pryke, Tom Sayers and Ian Tapp**; Changeling – Walt Martin, Alan Robert Murray, John T. Reitz and Gregg Rudloff; The Dark Knight – Lora Hirschberg, Richard King, Ed Novick and Gary Rizzo; Quantum of Solace – Eddy Joseph, Chris Munro, Mike Prestwood Smith, Mark Taylor and Jimmy Boyle; WALL-E – Ben Burtt, Tom Myers, Michael Semanick and Matthew Wood	**Best Special Visual Effects**: **The Curious Case of Benjamin Button – Eric Barba, Craig Barron, Nathan McGuinness and Edson Williams**; The Dark Knight – Chris Corbould, Nick Davis, Paul Franklin and Tim Webber; Indiana Jones and the Kingdom of the Crystal Skull – Pablo Helman, Marshall Krasser and Steve Rawlins; Iron Man – Shane Mahan, John Nelson, Ben Snow and Hal Hickel; Quantum of Solace – Chris Corbould and Kevin Tod Haug
**Outstanding British Film**: **Man on Wire – Simon Chinn and James Marsh**; Hunger – Laura Hastings-Smith, Robin Gutch, Steve McQueen and Enda Walsh; In Bruges – Graham Broadbent, Peter Czernin and Martin McDonagh; Mamma Mia! – Judy Craymer, Gary Goetzman, Phyllida Lloyd and Catherine Johnson; Slumdog Millionaire – Christian Colson, Danny Boyle and Simon Beaufoy	**Outstanding Debut by a British Writer, Director or Producer**: **Hunger – Steve McQueen (Writer/Director)**; Mamma Mia! – Judy Craymer (Producer); Man on Wire – Simon Chinn (Producer); Of Time and the City – Roy Boulter and Sol Papadopoulos (Producer); Son of Rambow – Garth Jennings (Writer)
**Best Short Animation**: **A Matter of Loaf and Death – Steve Pegram, Nick Park and Bob Baker**; Codswallop – Greg McLead and Myles McLead; Varmints – Sue Goffe and Marc Craste	**Best Short Film**: **September – Stewart Le Marechal and Esther May Campbell**; The Business Trip – Celine Quideau and Sean Ellis; Kingsland #1: The Dreamer – Kate Ogborn and Tony Grisoni; Love You More – Sam Taylor-Johnson, Patrick Marber, Anthony Minghella and Caroline Harvey; Ralph – Olivier Kaempfer and Alex Winckler
**Best Animated Film**: **WALL-E – Andrew Stanton**; Persepolis – Marjane Satrapi and Vincent Paronnaud; Waltz with Bashir – Ari Folman	**Best Film Not in the English Language**: **I've Loved You So Long – Yves Marmion and Philippe Claudel**; The Baader Meinhof Complex – Bernd Eichinger and Uli Edel; Gomorrah – Domenico Procacci and Matteo Garrone; Persepolis – Marc-Antoine Robert, Xavier Rigault, Marjane Satrapi and Vincent Paronnaud; Waltz with Bashir – Serge Lalou, Gerhard Mexiner, Yael Nahlieli and Ari Folman
**Rising Star Award**: **Noel Clarke**; Michael Cera; Michael Fassbender; Rebecca Hall; Toby Kebbell

== Statistics ==
Films that received multiple nominations
Nominations	Film
11	The Curious Case of Benjamin Button
11	Slumdog Millionaire
9	The Dark Knight
8	Changeling
6	Frost/Nixon
5	The Reader
4	In Bruges
4	Milk
4	Revolutionary Road
3	Burn After Reading
3	Doubt
3	I've Loved You So Long
3	Mamma Mia!
3	WALL-E
2	The Duchess
2	Hunger
2	Man on Wire
2	Persepolis
2	Quantum of Solace
2	Waltz with Bashir
2	The Wrestler

Films that received multiple awards
Awards	Film
7	Slumdog Millionaire
3	The Curious Case of Benjamin Button

== In Memoriam ==
- Charlton Heston
- John Daly
- Patrick McGoohan
- Harold Pinter
- Jonathan Bates
- Claude Berri
- Youssef Chahine
- Anthony Minghella
- Jules Dassin
- Richard Widmark
- Van Johnson
- Michael Crichton
- Roy Scheider
- Malcolm Cooke
- Mel Ferrer
- Isaac Hayes
- John Michael Hayes
- Charles H. Joffe
- Harry Lange
- Sydney Pollack
- Robert Mulligan
- Stan Winston
- Mark Shivas
- Cyd Charisse
- Les Ostinelli
- Kon Ichikawa
- David Watkin
- Paul Newman

== See also ==
- 81st Academy Awards
- 34th César Awards
- 14th Critics' Choice Awards
- 61st Directors Guild of America Awards
- 22nd European Film Awards
- 66th Golden Globe Awards
- 29th Golden Raspberry Awards
- 23rd Goya Awards
- 24th Independent Spirit Awards
- 14th Lumière Awards
- 20th Producers Guild of America Awards
- 13th Satellite Awards
- 35th Saturn Awards
- 15th Screen Actors Guild Awards
- 61st Writers Guild of America Awards
