= Golden Reel Award for Outstanding Achievement in Sound Editing – Sound Effects, Foley, Dialogue and ADR for Foreign Language Feature Film =

Film award category

- Country: United States
- Presented by: Motion Picture Sound Editors
- Currently held by: Yang Jiang, Zhao Nan, Li Xinghui, Han Junsheng, Ann Scibelli, Xiao'ou Olivia Zhang, Iain Pattison – Cliff Walkers (2021)

The Golden Reel Award for Outstanding Achievement in Sound Editing – Sound Effects, Foley, Dialogue and ADR for Foreign Language Feature Film is an annual award given by the Motion Picture Sound Editors. It honors sound editors whose work has warranted merit in the field of cinema; in this case, their work in the field of non-English language film. It was first awarded in 1983, for films released the previous year, but was separated into two categories: Best Sound Editing - Foreign Feature - Dialogue and Best Sound Editing - Foreign Feature - Sound Effects This was amended in 1985, when ADR and sound effects were combined for the category Best Sound Editing - Foreign Feature. It was not until 2018, when this award was first given under its current title, that this category awarded, exclusively, non-English language films. Previously, the award was given to either foreign language films and/or English language films produced outside of the United States.

== Winners and nominees ==
=== 1980s ===
Best Sound Editing - Foreign Feature - Dialogue

Year	Film	Winners/Nominees	Country
1982	Victor/Victoria		United Kingdom; United States
1983	The Grey Fox		Canada

Best Sound Editing - Foreign Feature - Sound Effects

Year	Film	Winners/Nominees	Country
1982	Das Boot		West Germany
1983	Octopussy		United Kingdom

Best Sound Editing - Foreign Feature

Year	Film	Winners/Nominees	Country
1984	Phar Lap		Australia
1984	The Bounty	Alan Bell	
1984	Greystoke: The Legend of Tarzan, Lord of the Apes	Les Wiggins, Roy Baxter	
1984	The Killing Fields	Ian Fuller	
1984	The Little Drummer Girl	Dan Sable	
1984	The NeverEnding Story	Mike LaMare	
1984	A Passage to India	Winon Rider	
1984	Once Upon a Time in America	Roberto Rietti	
1985	Runaway Train	James Rodan	United States
1985	The Emerald Forest	Ron Davis	
1985	Enemy Mine	Mike Lemare	
1985	Mad Max: Beyond Thunderdome	Bruce Lambshead, Terry Robman	
1985	Ran	Sumio Yanoguchi	
1986	Aliens		United States; United Kingdom
1986	Crocodile Dundee	Tim Chau	Australia; United States
1986	The Fly		
1986	Little Shop of Horrors		
1986	The Mission		
1986	The Name of the Rose		
1986	Round Midnight		
1987	The Living Daylights	Colin Miller	United Kingdom
1987	Cry Freedom	Jonathan Bates	
1987	Full Metal Jacket	Edward Tise	
1987	Hope and Glory	Ron Davis	
1987	The Last Emperor	Les Wiggins	
1988	Gorillas in the Mist		United States
1988	A Cry in the Dark		
1988	Dead Ringers		
1988	Frantic		
1988	Madame Sousatzka		
1988	The Man from Snowy River II		
1988	Wings of Desire		
1988	A World Apart		
1989	Dead Calm		Australia
1989	The Adventures of Baron Munchausen		
1989	Batman		
1989	The Bear		
1989	Communion		
1989	Henry V		
1989	The Winter War		

=== 1990s ===
Year	Film	Winners/Nominees	Country
1990	Quigley Down Under	Tim Chau, Frank Lipson, Gavin Myers, Martin Oswin	Australia; United States
1990	Akira Kurosawa's Dreams		
1990	Cyrano de Bergerac		
1990	Memphis Belle		
1990	The Sheltering Sky		
1991	Black Robe	Penn Robinson (supervising sound editor); Jeanine Chiavlo (supervising dialogue/ADR editor); Karin Whittington (sound effects editor); Frank Morrone (dialogue/ADR editor/ADR mixer); Stephanie Flack (dialogue/ADR editor); David Grusovin, Susan Midgley (assistant sound effects editors); Nicki Roller (Foley mixer); Phil Judd (re-recording mixer)	Canada; Australia
1991	The Fisher King		
1991	The Inner Circle		
1991	La Femme Nikita		
1991	Scanners II: The New Order		
1991	Thelma & Louise		
1992	The Lover		France
1992	1492: Conquest of Paradise		
1992	City of Joy		
1992	Indochine		
1992	Mr. Baseball	Martin Oswin	
1992	Proof		
1993	The Piano	Martin Oswin (sound effects mixer), Lee Smith (sound designer)	New Zealand
1993	Léolo	Marcel Pothier & Mathieu Beaudin (sound editors)	
1993	The Man Without a Face	Jonathan Bates (supervising sound editor)	
1993	Shadowlands	Jonathan Bates (supervising sound editor)	
1993	To Want to Fly	Amedeo Casati (sound editor)	
1994	Léon: The Professional	John Morris, Patrice Grisolet (sound effects editors); Bruno Tarrière (re-recording/ADR/Foley mixer)	France
1995	The City of Lost Children	Pierre Excoffier (production mixer); Laurent Kossayan (special sound effects); Vincent Arnardi (re-recording mixer)	France
1995	12 Monkeys		
1995	Farinelli		
1995	Goldeneye		
1995	Jefferson in Paris		
1995	Les Miserables		
1995	Shanghai Triad		
1996	The Horseman on the Roof		France
1996	The Frighteners		
1996	Hamlet		
1996	Michael Collins		
1996	Microcosmos		
1996	Shine		
1996	White Squall		
1997	Tomorrow Never Dies	Martin Evans (supervising sound editor); Nigel Mills (sound effects/dialogue editor); Peter Baldock, Peter Bond, Chips Paul, Adrian Rhodes (sound effects editors); Peter Holt, Christine Newell (Foley editors); John Cochrane (dialogue editor); John Ireland (ADR editor)	United Kingdom
1997	Crash	John Douglas Smith	Canada; United Kingdom
1997	G.I. Jane	Campbell Askew (supervising sound editor)	United States
1997	Seven Years in Tibet	Peter Pennell (supervising sound editor)	United States
1997	Oscar and Lucinda		United Kingdom; Australia
1997	The Wings of the Dove		United Kingdom; United States
1997	The Full Monty		United Kingdom
1997	Mrs Brown		United Kingdom
1998	The Borrowers	Peter Joly (supervising sound editor); Adrian Rhodes (sound effects editor); Ian Wilson (Foley editor); Danny Longhurst (dialogue editor); William Trent (ADR editor)	United Kingdom; United States
1998	The Avengers	Peter Joly (supervising sound editor); Adrian Rhodes (sound effects editor); Ian Wilson (Foley editor); Danny Longhurst (dialogue editor); Mark Rose (assistant sound effects editor)	United States
1998	Babe: Pig in the City	Julius Chan, Wayne Pashley (supervising sound editors); Gareth Vanderhope (sound designer); Steve Burgess (supervising Foley editor); Angus Robertson (supervising dialogue/ADR editor); Lisa Bate, Brent Burge, Liam Egan, Antony Gray, Frank Lipsom, Geoffrey G. Rubay, Phil Winters (sound effects editors); Andrew Neil (Foley editor); Libby Villa, Jenny T. Ward (dialogue editors); Cody Dorkin, Sonal Joshi (ADR editors); Gerry Long, John Simpson (Foley artists)	Australia; United States
1998	Elizabeth	Mark Auguste (supervising sound editor); Tim Hands (dialogue/ADR editor); Derek Trigg (Foley editor); Sam Auguste, Howard Halsall (sound effects editors)	United Kingdom
1998	Hilary and Jackie	Nigel Heath, Julian Slater (sound designers); James Feltham (dialogue editor); Arthur Graley (sound effects editor); Stan Fiferman, Pam Finch, Lionel Selwyn (Foley artists)	United Kingdom
1998	Lost in Space	Eddy Joseph (supervising sound editor); Renée Tondelli (supervising ADR editor); Scott G.G. Haller, Daniel Irwin, Nancy MacLeod, Joe Milner, Steve Schwalbe (sound effects editors); Peter Holt (Foley editor); David Arnold, Teri Dorman, Suhail Kafity, Nigel Mills (dialogue editors); Philip Alton, Jason King, Jonathan Klein (ADR editors); Paul Apted, Nina Hartstone, Ethan Holzman, Graham Peters, David Teitelbaum, Robin Whittaker (assistant sound effects editors); Paula Boram, Pauline Griffiths (Foley artists)	United States
1998	The Truman Show	Lee Smith (sound designer); Karin Whittington (supervising ADR editor); Rick Lisle, Peter Townend (sound effects editors); Tim Jordan, Andrew Plain (dialogue editors); Nicholas Breslin, Maureen Rodbard-Bean (assistant sound effects editors)	United States
1998	Shakespeare in Love	John Downer (supervising sound editor); Howard Eaves (Foley editor); Sarah Morton (dialogue editor); Brigitte Arnold (ADR editor); Colin Chapman (assistant sound effects editor); Paula Boram, Pauline Griffiths, Jenny Lee Wright (Foley artists)	United Kingdom; United States
1999	The Messenger: The Story of Joan of Arc	Vincent Tulli (supervising sound editor/sound designer); Anne Delacour, Frédérique Lebel, Bridget O'Driscoll, Ken Yasumoto (assistant sound effects editors); Jérôme Lévy, Pascal Mazière (Foley artists)	France
1999	The Emperor and the Assassin	Jing Tao	China
1999	Entrapment	Jim Shields (supervising sound editor); Robert Risk (Foley editor); William Parnell (ADR/dialogue editors)	United States; United Kingdom
1999	eXistenZ	David Evans (supervising sound editor); Wayne Griffin (supervising dialogue editor); Mark Gingras (ADR/dialogue editor); Tom Bjelic, Paul Shikata (sound effects editors); John Laing (dialogue editor)	Canada; France; United Kingdom
1999	Pushing Tin	Sue Baker, Colin Miller (supervising sound editors); Jacques Leroide (Foley editor); Ross Adams, Derek Holding (dialogue editors)	United States
1999	The Red Violin	Gaétan Huot (supervising sound editor); Wayne Griffin (supervising dialogue editor)	Canada; Italy; United Kingdom
1999	Run Lola Run	Dirk Jacob (supervising sound editor); Markus Münz, Kai Storck (sound effects editors)	Germany
1999	The World Is Not Enough	Martin Evans (supervising sound editor); Peter Holt (supervising Foley editor); John Cochrane (supervising dialogue editor); John Ireland (supervising ADR editor); Peter Bond, Andy Kennedy (sound effects editors)	United Kingdom; United States

=== 2000s ===
Year	Film	Winners/Nominees	Country
2000	Snatch	Danny Sheehan (supervising sound editor); Matthew Collinge (sound designer/sound effects editor); Michael Redfern (Foley editor); Dianne Greaves, Jason Swanscott (Foley artists)	United Kingdom
2000	Grizzly Falls	Tim Lewiston (supervising sound editor); Howard Eaves (sound effects editor); Vicky Brazier (Foley editor); Joe Dunphy (ADR editor)	Canada
2000	Billy Elliot	Zane Hayward (supervising sound editor); Stewart Henderson (ADR/dialogue editor); Anthony Faust (Foley editor)	United Kingdom
2000	The Ninth Gate	Laurent Quaglio (sound effects editor); Katia Boutin (ADR editor)	France; Spain
2000	High Fidelity	Peter Joly (supervising sound editor); Danny Longhurst (dialogue editor); Michael Redfern (Foley editor)	United States
2000	Requiem for a Dream	Nelson Ferreira (supervising sound editor/ADR editor); Craig Henighan (sound effects editor); Stephen Barden, Jill Purdy (dialogue editors)	United States
2000	Running Free	Rodney Glenn (supervising sound editor); Michael Feinberg (Foley editor); Brigitte Arnold (ADR editor); Laura Lovejoy (dialogue editor)	United States
2000	Shadow of the Vampire	Nigel Heath (supervising sound editor); Julian Slater (sound effects editor); Arthur Graley (Foley editor); James Feltham (ADR/dialogue editor)	Luxembourg; United Kingdom; United States
2001	Amélie	Laurent Kossayan (supervising sound editor/sound designer); Gérard Hardy (supervising sound editor); Alexandre Widmer (supervising dialogue editor); Marilena Cavola, Igor Thomas-Gerard, Guillaume Leriche (sound effects editors)	France
2001	Behind the Sun	Waldir Xavier (supervising sound editor)	Brazil; France; Switzerland
2001	Enemy at the Gates	Eddy Joseph (supervising sound editor/sound designers); Nick Lowe (supervising ADR editor); Martin Cantwell (sound effects editor); Peter Holt (Foley editor); Colin Ritchie (dialogue editor); Andreas Biegler, Johannes Kovecny (additional sound effects editors)	United Kingdom; United States; France; Germany
2001	Harry Potter and the Sorcerer's Stone	Eddy Joseph (supervising sound editor/sound designer); Martin Cantwell (sound effects editor); Peter Holt (Foley editor); Colin Ritchie (dialogue editor); Nick Lowe (ADR editor)	United Kingdom; United States
2001	Moulin Rouge!	Brent Burge (supervising sound editor); Antony Gray (supervising dialogue editor); Linda Murdoch, Gareth Vanderhope, Alex Wong (sound effects editors); Michael Axinn, Susan Dawes (ADR editors); Livia Ruzic (dialogue editor)	Australia; United States
2001	The Lord of the Rings: The Fellowship of the Ring	Ethan Van der Ryn, Mike Hopkins (supervising sound editors/sound designers); Ray Beentjes, Jason Canovas, Chris Todd (dialogue/ADR editors); Brent Burge, David Farmer, John McKay, Tim Nielsen, Craig Tomlinson, Dave Whitehead (sound effects editors)	New Zealand; United States
2001	The Princess and the Warrior	Dirk Jacob (supervising sound editor); Kai Tebbel, Guido Zettier (sound effects editors)	Germany
2001	Time and Tide	Martin Richard Chappell (sound effects editor), May Mok (dialogue editor)	Hong Kong
2002	Winged Migration	Michel Crivellaro, Gina Pignier (sound effects editors)	France; Italy; Switzerland; Germany
2002	Brotherhood of the Wolf	François Fayard, Vincent Guillon (sound effects editors)	France
2002	Die Another Day	Martin Evans (supervising sound editor); Peter Holt (supervising Foley editor); John Cochrane (supervising dialogue editor); Daniel Laurie (supervising ADR editor); Michael Crouch, David Evans, Dominic Gibbs, Gregg Wilson (sound effects editors)	United Kingdom; United States
2002	Harry Potter and the Chamber of Secrets	Randy Thom (supervising sound editor/sound designer); Dennis Leonard (supervising sound editor); Derek Trigg (supervising Foley editor); Martin Cantwell, Andy Kennedy, Nick Lowe, Colin Ritchie (sound effects editors)	United Kingdom; United States
2002	The Lord of the Rings: The Two Towers	Mike Hopkins (supervising sound editor/sound designer/dialogue/ADR editor); Ethan Van der Ryn (supervising sound editor/sound designer/Foley editor); Ray Beentjes, Jason Canovas (dialogue/ADR editors); Brent Burge, Hayden Collow, David Farmer, Krysten Mate, John McKay, Craig Tomlinson, Dave Whitehead (sound effects editors); Mark Franken, Polly McKinnon, Nigel Stone (ADR editors)	New Zealand; United States
2002	The Pianist	Gérard Hardy (supervising sound editor), Katia Boutin (supervising dialogue editor), Paul Conway (supervising ADR editor)	France; Germany; United Kingdom; Poland
2002	Rabbit-Proof Fence	John Penders (supervising sound/dialogue editor); Craig Carter (supervising sound editor); Steve Burgess (supervising Foley editor); Ricky Edwards, Andrew Plain (ADR editors)	Australia
2003	City of God	Martin Hernández, Roland N. Thai (supervising sound editors); Alessandro Laroca (supervising dialogue editor)	Brazil
2003	28 Days Later	Glenn Freemantle (supervising sound editor); Tom Sayers (sound effects editor); Gillian Dodders (dialogue/ADR editor); Grahame Peters (Foley editor)	United Kingdom
2003	Cold Mountain	Eddy Joseph (supervising sound editor); Mark Levinson (supervising ADR editor); Martin Cantwell (sound effects editor); Alex Joseph (Foley editor); Colin Ritchie (dialogue editor)	United States; Romania; Italy
2003	Dust	Peter Baldock (supervising sound editor); Jack Whittaker (sound effects editor); Philip Alton, Tim Hands, Daniel Laurie, Richard Todman (dialogue/ADR editors)	Macedonia; United Kingdom; Italy; Germany
2003	The Lord of the Rings: The Return of the King	Ethan Van der Ryn, Mike Hopkins (supervising sound editors/sound designers); David Farmer (additional sound designer); Mark Franken (sound effects/dialogue editor); Ray Beentjes, Nick Breslin, Polly McKinnon (dialogue/ADR editors); Beau Borders, Brent Burge, Hayden Collow, Tim Nielsen, Addison Teague, Craig Tomlinson, Dave Whitehead (sound effects editors); Peter Mills, Katy Wood (Foley editor); Jason Canovas (dialogue editor); Chris Ward (ADR editor)	New Zealand; United States
2003	Underworld	Claude Letessier (supervising sound editor); Benedikt Just, Marcel Spisak (sound effects editors); Magda Habernickel (dialogue editor)	United Kingdom; Germany; United States; Hungary
2003	Veronica Guerin	John Downer (supervising sound editor); Oliver Tarney (sound effects editor); Paul McFadden (ADR editor)	United States; Ireland; United Kingdom
2003	Whale Rider	Stephan Colli (supervising sound editor); Chris Burt (supervising ADR editor); Mirko Reinhard, Josef Steinbüchel, Markus Wimmer, André Zimmerman (sound effects editors); Sven Neumann, Luigi Rensinghoff (dialogue editors)	New Zealand; Germany
2004	House of Flying Daggers	Roger Savage, Jing Tao (supervising sound editors); Jo Mion (supervising Foley editor); Steve Burgess, Ron Feruglio, Vic Kaspar, Andrew Neil, Glenn Newnham, Paul Pirola (sound effects editors); Blair Slater, Mario Vaccaro (Foley editors)	China; Hong Kong
2004	Harry Potter and the Prisoner of Azkaban	David Evans (supervising sound editor/sound designer); Richard Beggs (sound designer); Derek Trigg (supervising Foley editor); Andy Kennedy, Jon Olive, Bjørn Ole Schroeder, Sam Southwick (sound effects editors); Stuart Morton (Foley editor); Stefan Henrix (dialogue editor); Tony Currie, Nick Lowe (ADR editors)	United Kingdom; United States
2004	Hero	Roger Savage, Jing Tao (supervising sound editors); Steve Burgess (sound designer/supervising Foley editor); Robert Mackenzie, Paul Pirola (sound designers); Chris Goodes, Andrew Neil, Glenn Newnham, Francis Ward Lindsay (sound effects editors)	China
2004	King Arthur	Lon Bender, Eddy Joseph (supervising sound editors/sound designers); Colin Ritchie (supervising dialogue/ADR editor); Alex Joseph (supervising Foley editor); James Harrison, Sue Lenny, Francis Ward Lindsay, James Mather, Oliver Tarney (sound effects editors); Harry Barnes (Foley editor); Iain Eyre, Steve Schwalbe (dialogue editors)	United States; United Kingdom; Ireland
2004	Nicotina	Lena Esquenazi (supervising sound editor); Eduardo Vaisman (Foley editor)	Mexico; Argentina
2004	Touching the Void	Joakim Sundström (supervising sound editor); Anthony Faust (supervising Foley editor); Robert Brazier (Foley editor)	United Kingdom
2004	Troy	Martin Cantwell, Wylie Stateman (supervising sound editors/sound designers); James Boyle (sound designer); Harry Barnes (supervising Foley editor); Paul Conway (supervising ADR editor); Matthew Grime, Howard Halsall, Alex Joseph, Sue Lenny, Simon Price, Steve Schwalbe, Nigel Stone (sound effects editors)	United States; United Kingdom; Malta
2004	A Very Long Engagement	Gérard Hardy, Laurent Kossayan (supervising sound editors); Igor Thomas-Gerard (supervising dialogue/ADR editor); Yannick Vergne (supervising Foley editor); Marilena Cavola, Cedric Denooz, Alexandre Widmer (sound effects editors)	France
2005	Harry Potter and the Goblet of Fire	Randy Thom (supervising sound editor/sound designer); Dennis Leonard, (supervising sound editor); Alex Joseph (supervising Foley editor), Bjørn Ole Schroeder (supervising dialogue editor); Daniel Laurie (supervising ADR editor), Will Files, Sam Auguste, Andy Kennedy, Douglas Murray, Jon Olive (sound effects editors); Peter Burgis, Andie Derrick (Foley artists)	United Kingdom; United States
2005	Batman Begins	David Evans, Stefan Henrix (supervising sound editors/sound designers); Justine Angus, Rodney Berling, Rodney Glenn, Nigel Holand, Jed Loughran (sound effects editors); Derek Trigg (Foley editor); Iain Eyre (dialogue editor); Howard Halsall (ADR editor); Glen Gathard (assistant Foley editor); Peter Burgis, Andie Derrick (Foley artists)	United States; United Kingdom
2005	Charlie and the Chocolate Factory	Eddy Joseph (supervising sound editor/sound designer); Steve Boeddeker (sound designer); Alex Joseph (supervising Foley editor); Colin Ritchie (supervising dialogue editor); Tony Currie (dialogue/ADR editor); Martin Cantwell, John Warhurst (sound effects editors); Simon Chase (Foley editor); Peter Burgis, Andie Derrick (Foley artists)	United States; United Kingdom
2005	The Constant Gardener	Joakim Sundström (supervising sound editor); Nick Adams, Jennie Evans (sound editors); Paul Wrightson (ADR editor); Nicolas Becker (Foley artist)	United Kingdom; Germany
2005	Downfall	Stefan Busch, Nico Krebs (sound designers); Nina Roll (supervising dialogue editor); Lisa Geffcken-Reinhard (sound editor); Fabian Schmidt (dialogue/ADR editor); Jörn Poetzl, Carsten Richter (Foley artists)	Germany; Italy; Austria
2005	Kingdom of Heaven	Per Hallberg (supervising sound editor/sound designer); Alex Joseph (supervising Foley editor); Colin Ritchie (supervising dialogue editor); Paul Conway (supervising ADR editor); Bryan Bowen, Martin Cantwell, Glen Gathard, James Harrison, Sue Lenny, Peter Staubli, Oliver Tarney (sound effects editors); Harry Barnes (Foley editor); Simon Chase (dialogue editor); Tony Currie (ADR editor); Peter Burgis, Andie Derrick (Foley artists)	United Kingdom; Germany; United States
2005	Peter Jackson's King Kong	Ethan Van der Ryn, Mike Hopkins (supervising sound editors/sound designers); Brent Burge, David Farmer, Dave Whitehead (sound designers); John Simpson (supervising Foley editor); Hayden Collow, Melanie Graham, Matthew Lambourn, Justin Webster, Katy Wood (sound effects editors); Peter Mills, Craig Tomlinson (Foley editors); Ray Beentjes, Jason Canovas, Martin Kwok (dialogue editors); Polly McKinnon, Chris Ward, Jenny T. Ward (ADR editors); Robyn McFarlane, Carolyn McLaughlin (Foley artists)	New Zealand; United States
2005	Kung Fu Hustle	Steve Burgess (supervising sound editor); Paul Pirola, Steven Ticknor (sound designer); Chris Goodes, Vic Kaspar, Jo Mion, Andrew Neil (sound effects editors); Mario Vaccaro (Foley artist)	China

Best Sound Editing for Sound Effects and Foley in a Foreign Film

Year	Film	Winners/Nominees	Country
2006	Pan's Labyrinth	Martin Hernández (supervising sound editor/sound designer); Roland N. Thai (sound designer/sound effects editor); Sergio Diaz (supervising dialogue/ADR/dialogue editor); Dana Blanco (sound effects editor/Foley artist); Alejandro Quevedo (sound effects editor); Carlos Zamorano (Foley artist)	Spain; Mexico
2006	Babel	Martin Hernández (supervising sound editor); Roland N. Thai (sound designer); Shawn Kennelly (supervising Foley editor); Alejandro Quevedo (sound effects editor); Richard Burton, Thierry J. Couturier, Sergio Diaz, Robert Troy (dialogue editors); Laura Macias, Vince Nicastro (Foley artists)	United States; Mexico; Morocco; France
2006	The Black Dahlia	Paula Fairfield (supervising sound editor); Carla Murray (sound designer/sound effects editor); Jill Purdy (supervising ADR/dialogue editor); Lee de Lang, Nathan Robitaille (sound effects editors); Lisa J. Levine (ADR editor); Steve Baine (Foley artist)	United States; France; Germany
2006	Casino Royale	Eddy Joseph (supervising sound editor/sound designer); Martin Cantwell (sound designer); Alex Joseph (supervising Foley editor); James Boyle, James Harrison, Oliver Tarney, Jack Whittaker (sound effects editors); Iain Eyre, Stuart Morton (Foley editors); Simon Chase (dialogue editor); Colin Ritchie (ADR editor); Peter Burgis, Andie Derrick (Foley artists)	United Kingdom; United States; Czech Republic; Germany
2006	Children of Men	David Evans (supervising sound editor/sound designer); Richard Beggs (sound designer); Bjørn Ole Schroeder, Sam Southwick (sound effects editors); Harry Barnes, Stuart Morton (Foley editors); Tony Currie (dialogue editor); Iain Eyre, Nick Lowe (ADR editors); Peter Burgis (Foley artist)	United Kingdom; United States; Japan
2006	Lucky Number Slevin	Paula Fairfield (supervising sound editor); Carla Murray (sound designer/sound effects editor); Jill Purdy (supervising ADR/dialogue editor); Lee de Lang, Nathan Robitaille (sound effects editors); Steve Baine (Foley artist)	Germany; Canada; United Kingdom; United States
2006	Curse of the Golden Flower	Roger Savage, Jing Tao (supervising sound editors); Mario Vaccaro (supervising Foley editor); Rainbow Wang (supervising dialogue editor); Qiuxia Sun (supervising ADR editor); Steve Burgess, Hongrui Ji, Robert Mackenzie, Michael McMenomy, Glenn Newnham, Paul Pirola, Ye Shu, Andy Wright (sound effects editors); Terry Tu (Foley artist)	China
2006	United 93	Eddy Joseph, Oliver Tarney (supervising sound editors/sound designers); Harry Barnes (supervising Foley editor); Richard Fordham (supervising dialogue editor); Paul Conway (supervising ADR editor); Martin Cantwell, Jack Whittaker (sound effects editors); Alex Joseph (Foley editor); Simon Chase, Tony Currie (dialogue editors); Stuart Morton (ADR editor)	United Kingdom; United States; France

Best Sound Editing - Sound Effects, Foley, Dialogue & ADR in a Foreign Feature Film

Year	Film	Winners/Nominees	Country
2007	The Orphanage	Oriol Tarragó (supervising sound editor); Jordi Bosch, Edgar Vidal (Foley editors); Xavier Mas (dialogue editor); Jordi Ribas (assistant sound effects editor); Kiku Vidal (Foley artist); Marc Orts (sound mixer); Virgilio Martínez (sound mixing assistant)	Spain
2007	Atonement	Catherine Hodgson (supervising sound editor); Becki Ponting (supervising dialogue editor); Virginia Thorn (Foley editor); Andre Schmidt (dialogue editor); James Bellamy (music editor); Peter Burgis, Andie Derrick (Foley artists); Alexandros Sidiropoulos (Foley recordist/mixer); Alistair Renn (Foley recordist); Steve Haynes (ADR recordist); Danny Hambrook (production sound mixer); Paul Hamblin, Martin Jensen (re-recording mixers)	United Kingdom
2007	Redacted	Paula Fairfield (supervising sound editor); Carla Murray (sound designer/sound effects editor); Jill Purdy (supervising dialogue/ADR editor); Steve Baine (Foley artist); Peter Persaud (Foley recordist); Todd Beckett, Keith Elliott, Mark Zsifkovits (re-recording mixers)	United States; Canada
2007	The Diving Bell and the Butterfly	Francis Wargnier (sound effects editor); Cyrille Richard (dialogue editor); Philippe Penot (Foley artist)	France
2007	Eastern Promises	Michael O'Farrell, Wayne Griffin (supervising sound editors); Rob Bertola (sound effects editor); Tony Currie (dialogue/ADR editor); Caoimhe Doyle, Goro Koyama, Andy Malcolm (Foley artists)	United Kingdom; Canada
2007	Harry Potter and the Order of the Phoenix	James Mather (supervising sound editor/sound designer); Andy Kennedy (sound designer); Derek Trigg (supervising Foley editor); Bjørn Ole Schroeder (supervising dialogue editor); Daniel Laurie (supervising ADR editor); James Boyle, Iain Eyre, Samir Foco, Dominic Gibbs, Jed Loughran, Jon Olive, Vanesa Lorena Tate (sound effects editors)	United Kingdom; United States
2007	Sharkwater	Kevin Howard (supervising sound editor/music editor); Rob Hegedus (supervising dialogue editor); Richard Calistan (supervising ADR editor); Ed Douglas, Christopher Miller, Clive Turner (sound effects editors); Steve Copley, Stefan Fraticelli, John Sievert (Foley artists)	Canada
2008	Slumdog Millionaire	Glenn Freemantle, Tom Sayers (supervising sound editors/sound designers); Gillian Dodders (supervising dialogue editor/ADR editor); Hugo Adams (supervising Foley editor); Niv Adiri, Ben Barker (sound effects editors); Lee Herrick (dialogue editor); Peter Burgis, Ricky Butt, Jack Stew (Foley artists)	United Kingdom
2008	Australia	Wayne Pashley (supervising sound/ADR editor/sound designer); Fabian Sanjurjo (supervising sound effects editor); Rick Lisle (supervising Foley editor); Nick Breslin, Sonal Joshi (supervising dialogue editors); Damian Candusso, Nigel Christensen, Mark Franken, Damon Mouris, William Ward, Jenny T. Ward (sound effects editors); Anne Breslin, Polly McKinnon, Derryn Pasquill, Libby Villa (dialogue editors); Simon Hewitt, John Simpson (Foley artists)	Australia; United Kingdom; United States
2008	The Chronicles of Narnia: Prince Caspian	James Mather (supervising sound editor); James Boyle (sound designer); Derek Trigg (supervising Foley editor); Bjørn Ole Schroeder (supervising dialogue editor); Daniel Laurie (supervising ADR editor); Michael Fentum, Dominic Gibbs, Jed Loughran, Joseph Stracey (sound effects editors); Vanesa Lorena Tate (Foley editor); Paul Ackerman, Peter Burgis, Ricky Butt, Andie Derrick, Sue Harding (Foley artists)	United Kingdom; United States
2008	In Bruges	Julian Slater (supervising sound editor); James Harrison (sound designer); Dan Morgan (supervising dialogue/ADR editor); Robert Brazier (supervising Foley editor); Arthur Graley (Foley editor); Peter Burgis, Andie Derrick, Sue Harding, Rowena Wilkinson (Foley artists)	United Kingdom; United States
2008	Quantum of Solace	Eddy Joseph (supervising sound editor/sound designer); James Boyle, Martin Cantwell (sound designers); Alex Joseph (supervising Foley editor); Simon Chase (supervising ADR editor); James Harrison, Oliver Tarney (sound effects editors); Colin Ritchie (dialogue editor); Peter Burgis, Sue Harding, Ian Waggott (Foley artists)	United Kingdom; United States
2008	Hellboy II: The Golden Army	Scott Martin Gershin, Martin Hernández (supervising sound editors/sound designers); Christopher Barnett, Bryan Bowen, Martin Cantwell, Alejandro Quevedo, Stephen P. Robinson, Roland N. Thai, Peter Zinda (sound designers); Tom Bellfort (supervising dialogue/ADR editor); Dave McMoyler (supervising Foley editor); Robert Shoup (additional ADR supervisor); Sergio Diaz (lead dialogue editor); Oliver Tarney, Vanesa Lorena Tate (sound effects editors); Harry Barnes, Dominique Devoucoux, Christopher Wilson (Foley editors); Naiki Rossell (dialogue/ADR editor); Paul Conway, Tony Currie, Sam Southwick (ADR editors); Nicolas Becker, Peter Burgis, Andie Derrick, James Moriana, Jack Stew, Jeffrey Wilhoit (Foley artists)	United States
2008	Sukiyaki Western Django	Jun Nakamura (sound editor)	Japan
2009	District 9	Brent Burge, Chris Ward (supervising sound editors); Dave Whitehead (sound designer); Polly McKinnon, Justin Webster (dialogue/ADR editors); Hayden Collow, Melanie Graham (sound effects editors); Craig Tomlinson (Foley editor); Jason Canovas, Mark Franken (ADR editors); Robyn McFarlane, Carolyn McLaughlin (Foley artists)	New Zealand; United States; South Africa
2009	An Education	Glenn Freemantle (supervising sound editor); Nina Hartstone (supervising dialogue editor); Niv Adiri, Ben Barker, Tom Sayers (sound effects editors); Hugo Adams (Foley editor); Gillian Dodders (ADR editor); Andrea King, Jack Stew (Foley artists)	United Kingdom; United States
2009	Harry Potter and the Half-Blood Prince	James Mather (supervising sound editor/sound designer); Bjørn Ole Schroeder (supervising dialogue editor); Daniel Laurie (supervising ADR editor); Michael Fentum, Dominic Gibbs, Andy Kennedy, Jed Loughran (sound effects editors); Jamie McPhee, Derek Trigg (Foley editors); Allan Jenkins (music editor); Peter Burgis, Andie Derrick (Foley artists)	United Kingdom; United States
2009	The Baader Meinhof Complex	Stefan Busch (supervising sound editor/sound designer); Lisa Geffcken-Reinhard (supervising Foley editor); Fabian Schmidt (supervising dialogue editor); Jan Bloemeke, Nico Krebs (sound effects editors); Joo Fürst, Jörn Poetzl, Andreas Schneider (Foley artists)	Germany; France; Czech Republic
2009	Coco Before Chanel	Jean-Claude Laureux (supervising sound editor); Franck Desmoulins, Anne Gibourg, Sylvain Malbrant (sound designers); Claire-Anne Largeron (supervising Foley/ADR editor); Pascal Chauvin (Foley artist)	France; Belgium
2009	Red Cliff	Steve Burgess (supervising sound editor/sound designer); Sam Wang (sound designer); Blair Slater (supervising Foley editor); Wei He (supervising dialogue editor); Qiuxia Sun (supervising ADR editor); Chris Goodes, James Harvey, Robert Mackenzie, Peter Mills, Huijia Mo, Andrew Nell, Glenn Newnham, Paul Pirola, Terry Tu, Rainbow Wang (sound effects editors); Danielle Barron (Foley editor); Xu Miao, Mario Vaccaro, Yanchao Yang (Foley artists)	China

=== 2010s ===
Best Sound Editing - Sound Effects, Foley, Dialogue and ADR in a Feature Foreign Language Film

Year	Film	Winners/Nominees	Country
2010	Micmacs	Selim Azzazi (supervising sound editor/sound designer); Gérard Hardy (supervising sound editor); Jean-Pierre Lelong (supervising Foley editor); Marilena Cavola (supervising dialogue editor), Alain Lévy (supervising ADR editor); Nicolas Becker (Foley artist)	France
2010	Biutiful	Martin Hernández (supervising sound/Foley editor/sound designer); Alejandro Quevedo (sound designer); Arturo Zarate (supervising dialogue/ADR editor); Vanesa Lorena Tate (supervising ADR editor); Roland N. Thai (sound effects editor); Álex F. Capilla (dialogue editor); James Moriana, Jeffrey Wilhoit (Foley artists)	Mexico; Spain
2010	The Girl Who Played with Fire	Carl Aage Hansen (supervising sound editor/sound designer); Andreas Kongsgaard, Olle Tannergård (sound designers); Niels Arild, Anders Hörling (sound effects editors); Anne Jensen (Foley editor); Camilla Mauritzson Skjaerbaek (dialogue editor)	Sweden; Denmark; Germany
2010	The Girl with the Dragon Tattoo	Peter Schultz (supervising sound editor), Morten Holm (supervising dialogue/ADR editor), Niels Arild (supervising Foley editor), Peter Albrechtsen (sound effects editor), Andrea King (Foley artist)	Sweden; Denmark; Germany
2010	Lebanon	Stephan Colli (supervising sound editor), Alex Claude (sound designer), John Purcell (dialogue/ADR editor), Jan Petzold (sound effects editor), Sebastian Pohle (Foley editor), Wilmont Schulze (Foley artist)	Israel; United Kingdom; France; Germany
2010	Mother	Tae-young Choi (supervising sound editor); Ye-jin Cho, Hye Young Kang (sound designers); Chung-gyu Lee (Foley artist)	South Korea
2010	North Face	Guido Zettier (supervising sound editor/sound designer); Tobias Poppe (sound effects editor); Thomas Lüdemann, Alexander Vitt (sound editors); Laura Plock, Klaus Waßen-Floren (Foley editors); Alexander Buck (dialogue editor); Stephan Fandrych, Anja-Corinne Welter (ADR editors); Carsten Richter (Foley artist)	Germany
2011	The Flowers of War	Tao Jing (supervising sound editor/sound designer); Steve Burgess (supervising sound editor); James Ashton (supervising dialogue editor); Baiyang Wang (dialogue/ADR editor); Hongrui Ji, Chris Goodes, Zheng Huang, Robert Mackenzie, Yinan Tu, Tian Yong (sound effects editors); Adam Connelly, Wei Wang, Yanchao Yang (Foley editors); Xu Miao, Mario Vaccaro (Foley artists)	China; Hong Kong
2011	Battle of Warsaw 1920	Waclaw Pilkowski, Aleksandra Pniak (supervising sound editors); Kacper Habisiak, Maciej Tegi (sound designers); Krzysztof Jastrzab (supervising Foley editor); Filip Krzemien (supervising dialogue editor); Marcin Kasinski (supervising ADR editor); Jan Grabos (Foley editor); Mateusz Irisik, Jacek Pajak, Krzysztof Salwa, Marcin Wolak, Henryk Zastrózny (Foley artists)	Poland
2011	Circumstance	Glenn T. Morgan, Mathew Waters (supervising sound editors)	France; Iran; United States
2011	Elite Squad: The Enemy Within	Alessandro Laroca (supervising sound editor); Eduardo Virmond Lima (sound designer); Débora Opolski (supervising dialogue/ADR editor); Andre Azoubel (supervising Foley editor); Henrique Bertol (dialogue/ADR editor); Andressa Cor, Lilian Nakahodo, Priscila Pereira, Anderson Tieta (sound effects editors); Roger Hands (Foley artist)	Brazil
2011	In the Land of Blood and Honey	Becky Sullivan (supervising sound editor); Hector C. Gika, Glynna Grimala, Michael Hertlein, Gayle Wesley, Ben Wilkins (sound editors); Goro Koyama, Andy Malcolm (Foley artists)	United States
2011	Sarah's Key	Alexandre Fleurant, Bruno Seznec (supervising sound editors); Sébastien Marquilly (sound designer); Fabien Devillers (supervising dialogue/ADR editor); Florian Fabre (Foley artist)	France
2011	The Skin I Live In	Pelayo Gutiérrez (supervising sound editor); Eduardo Castro, Marc Orts (sound designers); César Molina (supervising dialogue editor); Álex F. Capilla (Foley artist)	Spain
2012	Rust and Bone	Pascal Villard (sound designer); Nikolas Javelle, David Vranken (sound effects editors); Caroline Reynaud (dialogue editor); Philippe Penot (Foley artist)	France; Belgium
2012	80 Million	Kacper Habisiak, Marcin Kasinski (supervising sound editors); Maciej Tegi (sound effects editor); Filip Krzemien (dialogue editor); Jacek Wisniewski (Foley artist); Tomasz Maciatek (Foley recordist)	Poland
2012	Amour	Nadine Muse (supervising sound editor); Pascal Chauvin, Franck Tassel (Foley artists)	Austria; France; Germany
2012	Children of Sarajevo	Igor Camo (sound designer), Miroslav Babic (sound editor), Peter Sandmann (Foley artist)	Bosnia and Herzegovina
2012	The Hypnotist	Aleksander Karshikoff (sound designer/dialogue editor); Carl Edström, Erik Guldager, Boris Laible, Gustav Landbecker (sound effects editors); Ulf Olausson (Foley artist); Samuel Åberg, Tomas Krantz (Foley recordists)	Sweden
2012	The Intouchables	Jean Goudier (sound designer/sound/dialogue editor), Fred Mays (supervising ADR editor), Pascal Chauvin (Foley artist)	France

Best Sound Editing - Sound Effects, Foley, Dialogue and ADR in a Foreign Feature Film

Year	Film	Winners/Nominees	Country
2013	The Grandmaster	Robert Mackenzie, Traithep Wongpaiboon (supervising sound editors); Steve Burgess, Nopawat Likitwong (sound designers); Guang Chen (supervising dialogue/ADR editor); John Simpson (supervising Foley editor); James Ashton, Ekaratt Chungsanga, Chris Goodes, Luke Mynott, Narubett Peamyai, Sam Petty (sound effects editors); Jifu Li, Shuo Zhang (dialogue editors); Chumnan Choponkrang, Sam Rogers (Foley artists)	Hong Kong; China
2013	Blue Is the Warmest Color	Fabien Pochet (supervising sound editor)	France
2013	Wadjda	Sebastian Schmidt (supervising sound editor), Sebastian Heyser (supervising dialogue/ADR editor), Christoph Wieczorek (supervising Foley editor), Marc Meusinger (ADR editor)	Saudi Arabia
2013	The Past	Thomas Desjonquères (supervising sound editor), Frédérique Liébaut (supervising ADR editor), François Lepeuple (Foley artist)	France; Iran; Italy

Best Sound Editing - Sound Effects, Foley, Dialogue, and ADR in a Foreign Language Feature

Year	Film	Winners/Nominees	Country
2014	The Liberator	Jay Nierenberg, Jonathan Wales (supervising sound editors); Trevor Gates (sound designer); Andres Velasquez (supervising ADR editor); Ramiro Belgardt (supervising music editor); Angela Hemingway, Todd Niesen (dialogue/ADR editors); Chris Diebold, Brent Findley, Steven Iba, Charles Maynes (sound effects editors); Zachary Schmitt (Foley editor); Juan Diego Borda, Aleksandar Sasha Panich (ADR editors); Vicki Vandegrift (Foley artist)	Venezuela; Spain
2014	Human Capital	Daniela Bassani (supervising sound editor); Gianni Pallotto (sound designer); Enzo Mandara (dialogue/ADR editor); Paolo Amici, Italo Cameracanna, Riccardo Cameracanna, Daniele Quadroli, David Quadroli, Fabrizio Quadroli (sound effects editors); Taketo Gohara (music editor)	Italy
2014	The Raid 2	Jonathan Greber (supervising sound/Foley editor); Al Nelson, Brandon Proctor (sound designers); Kim Foscato, Doug Winningham (sound effects editors); Sean England (Foley artist)	Indonesia
2014	Roar: Tigers of the Sundarbans	Amrit Pritam Dutta (supervising sound editor/sound designer/effects editor); Resul Pookutty (supervising sound editor/sound designer); Vijay Kumar (supervising Foley editor/sound effects editor); Abhishruti Bezbaruah, Arunav Dutta (sound effects editors); Sajjan Choudhary, Karnail Singh (Foley artists)	India
2014	Uzumasa Limelight	Carlos Sanches (supervising sound/dialogue/ADR editor); Matthew Thomas Hall, Joshua Aaron Johnson (sound designers); John Sanacore (supervising Foley editor); Gerardo Gonzalez, Hiroki Matsuura (sound effects editors); Kazuma Jinnouchi, Nobuko Toda (music editors); Jeffrey Wilhoit (Foley artist)	Japan
2015	Son of Saul	Tamás Zányi (supervising sound/Foley/dialogue/ADR editor/sound designer/sound effects/music editor/Foley artist); Tamás Székely (sound effects editor); Tamás Beke (Foley artist)	Hungary
2015	Days of Grace	Frédéric Le Louet (supervising sound/music editor/sound designer); Enrique Greiner (supervising sound editor/sound designer); Laurent Chassaigne (supervising Foley editor); Eric Dounce (supervising ADR editor/sound effects editor); Eduardo Castillo (supervising dialogue editor/dialogue/ADR editor); Cedric Denooz (sound effects/music editor); Frederic Devanlay, Diana Fonseca (sound effects editors); Manu Guiot (music editor); Gadou Naudin (Foley artist); Vincent Arnardi (supervising sound/re-recording mixer)	Mexico
2015	Northmen: A Viking Saga	Markus Glunz, Peter Staubli (supervising sound editors); Benjamin Krbetschek, Christoph Ulbich (sound designers); Dominik Schleier (supervising dialogue editor); Felix Andriessens (supervising ADR editor); Dietrich Körner, Laura Plock, David Rusitschka (sound effects editors); Jonathan Feurich (music editor); Max Bauer, Michael Stancyk (Foley artists)	Switzerland
2015	Unfreedom	Resul Pookutty (supervising sound/dialogue/ADR editor/sound designer); Amrit Pritam Dutta (supervising sound editor/sound designer); Vijay Kumar (supervising Foley/dialogue editor/sound effects editor); Wayne Sharpe (supervising music editor); Racchit Malhotra, Aravind Vijayakumar (dialogue/ADR editors); Sampath Alwar, Arunav Dutta (sound effects editors); Varun Visoi (Foley editor); Sajjan Choudhary, Karnail Singh (Foley artists)	United States; India
2016	The King's Choice	Christian Schaanning (supervising sound editor/sound designer); Fredrik Dalenfjäll, Erlend Hogstad, Jens Johansson (sound effects editors); Ingela Jönsson, Espen Rønning (dialogue editors); Lucas Nilsson (Foley artist)	Norway; Sweden; Denmark; Ireland
2016	Elle	Alexis Place (supervising sound editor), Katia Boutin (supervising dialogue/ADR editor), Gwennolé Le Borgne (sound effects editor)	France
2016	The Handmaiden	Chul-woo Moon (supervising sound editor); Suk-won Kim (sound designer); Eun-ah Choi (supervising dialogue editor); Eun-jung Kim (Foley editor/artist); Jung-ho Lee (sound effects editor); Min-kyung Cho, Yoon-sung Hong (dialogue editors)	South Korea
2016	Neruda	Miguel Hormazábal (sound designer); Ivo Moraga (sound effects editor/Foley artist); Toño Cubillo (ADR editor); Hervé Schneid (music editor); Sebastian Esquivel (Foley artist)	Chile
2016	Toni Erdmann	Fabian Schmidt (supervising sound editor)	Germany; Austria
2016	Under the Shadow	Richard Kondal (supervising sound editor); Alex Joseph (sound designer); Alex Outhwaite (sound effects editor); Gwilym Perry (Foley editor), Stelios Koupetoris (dialogue editor); Paula Boram (Foley artist)	United Kingdom; Qatar; Jordan

Outstanding Achievement in Sound Editing - Sound Effects, Foley, Dialogue and ADR for Foreign Language Feature Film

Year	Film	Winners/Nominees	Country
2017	Loveless	Andrey Dergachev (supervising sound editor); Aleksey Kobzar, Sofia Matrosova (sound effects editors); Ruslan Khuseyn, Elena Starikova, Dmitriy Zuev (Foley editors); Aleksey Kuznetsov (dialogue editor); Natalia Zueva (Foley artist)	Russia
2017	BPM (Beats per Minute)	Valérie Deloof (supervising sound editor); Antoine Bertucci, Maia Szymczak (sound effects editors); Agnes Ravez (dialogue editor); Pascal Chauvin, Franck Tassel (Foley artists)	France
2017	First They Killed My Father	Ben Barker, Glenn Freemantle (supervising sound editors/sound designers); Sven Taits (supervising dialogue editor); Danny Freemantle, Eilam Hoffman, Robert Malone (sound effects editors); Lilly Blazewicz, Nick Freemantle (Foley editors); Robert Chen, Jens Rosenlund Petersen (ADR editors); Peter Burgis, Jason Swanscott (Foley artists)	Cambodia
2017	The Happiest Day in the Life of Olli Maki	Pietu Korhonen (supervising sound editor); Heikki Kossi (Foley editor/artist); Peter Albrechtsen, Erik Clauss (sound effects editors)	Finland
2017	Thelma	Peter Albrechtsen, Gisle Tveito, Fredric Vogel (sound designers); Ingar Asdahl, Therese Næss Diesen, Peder Lindvær Hammersborg (sound effects editors); Yvonne Stenberg (Foley editor); Roy Fenstad (Foley artist)	Norway
2017	Wolf Warrior 2	Hayden Collow (supervising sound editor); Chris Ward (supervising dialogue editor); Brent Burge, Matthew Lambourn, Paul Pirola, Tom Scott-Toft, Matt Stutter (sound effects editors); Craig Tomlinson (Foley editor); Martin Kwok (dialogue editor); Stephen Gallagher (music editor); James Carroll (Foley artist)	China
2018	Roma	Sergio Díaz, Skip Lievsay (supervising sound editors/sound designers); Carlos Honc (supervising dialogue/ADR editor); Ruy García (supervising ADR editor); Michael Feuser (dialogue/ADR editor); Craig Berkey, Eric Dounce, Luis Huesca, Mitch Osias, Luis Omar Parra, Javier Quesada (sound effects editors); Jaime Sainz Cuevas, Igor Nikolic (Foley editors); Manuel Montaño, Caleb Townsend (dialogue editors); Alexa Zimmerman (ADR editor); Jay Peck, Alan Romero (Foley artists)	Mexico
2018	2.0	Amrit Pritam Dutta, Resul Pookutty (supervising sound editors); Arunav Dutta, Vijaykumar Mahadevaiah, Jagdish Nachnekar, Surabhi Pandit (sound effects editors); Krishnanunny Kj (dialogue editor); Miguel Barbosa, Diego S. Staub (Foley artists)	India
2018	Capernaum	Chadi Roukoz (supervising sound editor/sound designer); Simon Hanin (sound effects editor); Karine Bacha (dialogue editor); Patrick Egreteau, Eric Grattepain (Foley artists)	Lebanon
2018	Cold War	Maciej Pawlowski (supervising sound editor/sound designer/dialogue editor); Lukasz Swierzawski (sound designer); Jacek Tarkowski, Wojciech Slawacki (ADR editors); Grzegorz Koniarz, Grzegorz Sieradzki (Foley artists)	Poland
2018	The Guilty	Oskar Skriver (supervising sound editor); Philip Nicolai Flindt (sound effects editor); Lasse Joen Sørensen (Foley editor); Torben Greve (Foley artist)	Denmark
2018	Winter Brothers	Lars Halvorsen (supervising sound editor); Pietu Korhonen (Foley editor); Hans Christian Arnt Torp (dialogue editor); Heikki Kossi (Foley artist)	Denmark
2018	The Happy Prince	François Dumont (supervising sound editor); Jérémy Hassid (sound designer/Foley editor); Antony Gray (supervising ADR editor); Gervaise Demeure (sound effects editor); Jeroen Truijens (dialogue editor); Vincent Maloumian (Foley artist)	Germany; Belgium
2018	Never Look Away	Christoph von Schönburg (supervising sound editor/sound designer); Thomas Kalbér (supervising dialogue editor); Stephan Fandrych (supervising ADR editor); Magda Habernickel, Achim Hofmann, Benjamin Schäfer (ADR editors); Normann Büttner, Wolfi Müller (Foley editors); Max Bauer (Foley artist)	Germany
2018	Redbad	J. Murphy Ryan, Jonathan Wales (supervising sound editors); Eric Offin (sound designer); Jan Bezouska (sound effects editor); Taylor Westerfield (Foley editor); Paul Bijpost (dialogue editor); Julien Naudin (Foley artist)	Netherlands
2019	Parasite	Tae-young Choi (supervising sound editor); Young Kang Hye (sound designer/sound effects editor); Byung-in Kim (supervising ADR editor); Shin i Na (Foley editor); Chung-gyu Lee, Sung-gyun Park (Foley artists)	South Korea
2019	Atlantics	Benoit De Clerck (supervising sound editor); Thomas Ferrando (Foley editor); Michov Gillet (dialogue editor); Bertrand Boudaud (Foley artist)	Senegal; France
2019	The Fall of the American Empire	Marie-Claude Gagné (sound designer/sound effects editor); Natalie Fleurant (supervising ADR editor); Jean-Philippe Savard (sound effects editor); Claire Pochon (dialogue editor); Nicolas Gagnon (Foley artist)	Canada
2019	Gully Boy	Ayush Ahuja (supervising sound editor/sound designer); Nakul Kamte (music editor)	India
2019	The Sound Story	Resul Pookutty (supervising sound editor); Vijay Kumar (sound designer); Krishnanunny Kj (sound effects editor); Ram Kishan Nath (Foley editor); Anil Pawar, Karan Arjun Singh, Shankar Singh (Foley artists)	India
2019	Shadow	Jiang Yang (supervising sound editor/sound effects editor); Nan Zhao (supervising sound editor); Blake Leyh, Skip Lievsay, Ye Liu, Lawrence Zipf (sound effects editors); Wei Ning (Foley editor); Xinghui Li (dialogue editor); Junsheng Han (Foley artist)	China

=== 2020s ===
Year	Film	Winners/Nominees	Country
2020	The Eight Hundred	Kang Fu (supervising sound designer/editor); Steve Miller (sound effects editor); Ai Long Tan (dialogue editor); Fei Yu (music editor)	China
2020	Bacurau	Ricardo Cutz Gaudenzi (supervising sound editor); Matheus Miguens (sound effects editor); Rafael Faustino (Foley editor); Victor Quintanilha (dialogue editor); Pedro Coelho (Foley artist)	Brazil
2020	I'm No Longer Here	Javier Umpierrez (supervising sound editor); Lía Perez (Foley editor); Juan Sosa Rosell (dialogue editor); Javier Umpierrez (music editor); Marisela Suárez (Foley artist)	Mexico
2020	Jallikattu	Renganaath Ravee (supervising sound editor); Boney M. Joy, Sreejith Sreenivasan, Arun Rama Varma (sound effects editors); Mohammad Iqbal Paratwada, Amandeep Singh (Foley artists)	India
2020	The Life Ahead	Maurizio Argentieri (supervising sound editor); Riccardo Righini (dialogue editor); Mauro Eusepi (Foley artist)	Italy
2021	Cliff Walkers	Yang Jiang, Zhao Nan (supervising sound editors); Iain Pattison, Ann Scibelli, Xiao'ou Olivia Zhang (sound effects editors); Li Xinghui (ADR editor); Han Junsheng (Foley artist)	China
2021	The Hand of God	Silvia Moraes (supervising sound editor)	Italy
2021	A Hero	Mohammadreza Delpak (supervising sound editor/sound effects/dialogue editor)	Iran
2021	Titane	Séverin Favriau (sound effects editor); Céline Bernard (Foley artist)	Belgium; France
2021	A Writer's Odyssey	Xiao Sha Liu (supervising sound/ADR editor); Gang Wang (sound designer); Hong Rui Ji, Zi Jian Jiang, Ruo Qi Mo, Tobias Poppe, Gang Wang, Shuang Shuang Wang (sound effects editors); Pei Ya Zhang (Foley editor); Zi Jin (dialogue editor); Fei Yu (music editor); Yin Miao, Zi Wei Wang (Foley artist)	China
2022	All Quiet on the Western Front	Frank Kruse (supervising sound editor); Markus Stemler (sound designer); Alexander Buck (supervising dialogue editor); Benjamin Hörbe, Alexander Buck (supervising ADR editors); Thomas Kalbér, Moritz Hoffmeister (ADR editors); Kuen Il Song (Foley editor); Carsten Richter, Daniel Weis (Foley artist)	Germany
2022	Argentina, 1985	Santiago Fumagalli (supervising sound editor); Juan Ignacio Giobio, Nahuel De Camillis (sound effects editors); Ignacio Seligra (dialogue editor); Nicolás Mannara (Foley editor); Diego Marcone (Foley artist); Stephen M. Davis (music editor)	Argentina
2022	Bardo, False Chronicle of a Handful of Truths	Martín Hernández, Nicolas Becker (supervising sound editors); Ken Yasumoto (sound designer); Alejandro Quevedo, Jaime Sainz, Carolina Santana (sound effects editor); Alitzel Diaz, Daniel Douglass (ADR editors);Valeria López Mancheva, Raynier Hinojosa, Omar Blanco (dialogue editors); Oscar Victoria, Pietu Korhonen, Alan Romero (Foley editors); Heikki Kossi, Alan Romero (Foley artists)	Mexico
2022	EO	Radoslaw Ochnio (supervising sound editor); Radoslaw Ochnio (sound designer); Marta Weronika Weronska (sound effects editor); Suraj Bardia (Foley editor)	Poland; Italy
2022	The Quiet Girl	Steve Fanagan (supervising sound editor/sound designer/sound effects/Foley editor); Louise Burton (dialogue/ADR editor); Caoimhe Doyle (Foley artist)	Ireland
2022	Triangle of Sadness	Andreas Franck, Bent Holm, Gustav Landbecker, Johannes Dekko, Claes Lundberg, Benny Persson, Daniel Lindvik, Alexander Wunsch, Erik Watland (sound effects editors); Andreas Franck, Bent Holm (sound designers); Claes Lunderberg, Ulf Olausson (Foley artists)	Sweden; Germany; France; United Kingdom
2023	Society of the Snow	Oriol Tarragó, Iosu Martinez, Guillem Giró (supervising sound editors); Erik Vidal, Kiku Vidal (Foley artists); Sarah Romero, Marc Bech, Brendan Golden (sound effects editors); Oriol Tarragó (sound designer); John Finklea (music editor)	Spain; United States
2023	Anatomy of a Fall	Fanny Martin, Jeanne Delplancq (sound effects editors)	France
2023	Godzilla Minus One	Natsuko Inoue (Foley artist)	Japan
2023	The Zone of Interest	Johnnie Burn (supervising sound editor); Simon Carroll, Max Behrens, Joe Mount, Brendan Feeney (sound effects editors); Ewa Mazurkiewicz, Natalia Lubowiecka, Dawid Konecki, Kamil Kwiatkowski (Foley editors)	United Kingdom; Poland; United States
