= Tom Sayers (disambiguation) =

Tom Sayers (1826–1865) was a British boxer.

Tom Sayers may also refer to:

- Tom Sayers (sound editor), Academy Award nominated sound editor

== See also ==
- Thomas Sayers Ellis, poet, photographer and band leader
