= Resul Pookutty =

Indian sound designer and editor

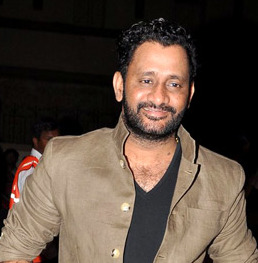
- Pookutty in 2015
- Born: 30 May 1971 (age 55); Vilakkupara, Kollam, Kerala, India
- Occupation: Sound engineer
- Years active: 1997 – present
- Spouse: Shadia
- Children: 2
- Honours: Padma Shri (2010)

Resul Pookutty (born 30 May 1971) is an Indian film sound designer, sound editor and audio mixer. He won the Academy Award for Best Sound Mixing in 2008, along with Richard Pryke and Ian Tapp, for Slumdog Millionaire. Pookutty has worked in Hindi, Tamil, Telugu, Marathi and Malayalam languages in addition to British films. He is a member of the Executive committee of Academy of Motion Picture Arts and Sciences, Motion Picture Sound Editors guild (MPSE) and Cinema Audio Society of America (CAS). In 2010, the Government of India honored him with Padma Shri, the fourth highest civilian award in the Republic of India, in recognition of his outstanding contributions to cinema. In the same year, he was conferred an honorary doctorate by Sree Sankaracharya University of Sanskrit.

== Early life ==
Born into a family in Vilakkupara, near Anchal about 40 km from Kollam, Kerala, India. He was the youngest of eight children. His father was a private bus ticket checker. Pookutty had to walk 6 km to the nearest school and study in the light of a kerosene lamp as his village had no electricity.

He did his bachelor's degree in physics from Milad-E-Sherief Memorial College, Kayamkulam during 1987–1990. He joined Government Law College, Thiruvananthapuram for studying Bachelor of Laws (LLB) degree, however, he was unable to complete it. In 1995, he graduated from Film and Television Institute of India in Pune. He wrote the remaining LLB exam papers and enrolled as an advocate in 2012. Pookutty said that it was his father's desire to make him an advocate.

== Career ==
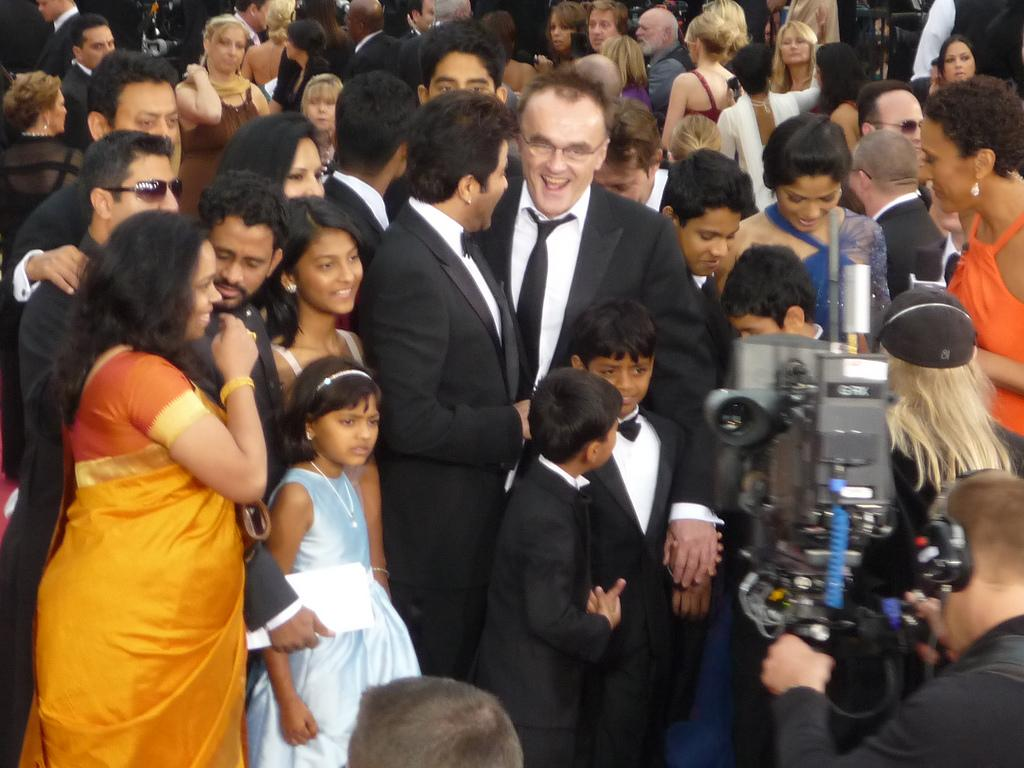
Pookutty along with Slumdog Millionaire team at the 81st Academy Awards

Pookutty moved to Mumbai after his graduation. He termed it as "a natural immigration as a graduate of the institute." He pointed out that "Ninety-five per cent of the technicians of the Mumbai film industry are alumni of FTII, Pune." Pookutty made his debut in sound design with the 1997 film Private Detective: Two Plus Two Plus One, directed by Rajat Kapoor. He got his big break with the critically acclaimed 2005 film Black, directed by Sanjay Leela Bhansali. He subsequently engineered sound for major productions like Musafir (2004), Zinda (2006), Traffic Signal (2007), Gandhi, My Father (2007), Saawariya (2007), Dus Kahaniyaan, Kerala Varma Pazhassi Raja (2009), and Enthiran (2010).

== Personal life ==
Pookutty is married to Shadia. They have two children.

== Filmography ==
Year	Film	Language	Notes
2003	Matrubhoomi: A Nation Without Women	Hindi	
2004	Musafir	Hindi	
2007	Traffic Signal	Hindi	
2007	Gandhi, My Father	Hindi	
2007	Saawariya	Hindi	
2007	Dus Kahaniyaan	Hindi	
2008	Slumdog Millionaire	English	Academy Award for Best Sound Mixing
2009	Kerala Varma Pazhassi Raja	Malayalam	National Film Award for Best Audiography
2010	Enthiran	Tamil	
2011	Ra.One	Hindi	
2011	Adaminte Makan Abu	Malayalam	
2012	Nanban	Tamil	
2012	The Best Exotic Marigold Hotel	English	
2012	English Vinglish	Hindi	
2013	Kunjananthante Kada	Malayalam	
2014	Kochadaiiyaan	Tamil	
2014	Ankhon Dekhi	Hindi	
2014	Highway	Hindi	
2014	Yaan	Tamil	
2015	Unfreedom	Hindi and English	
2015	Pathemari	Malayalam	
2016	Remo	Tamil	
2016	Niruttara	Kannada	
2017	Kaabil	Hindi	
2017	The Sound Story	Malayalam	
2018	Kammara Sambhavam	Malayalam	
2018	2.0	Tamil	
2019	Kolaambi	Malayalam	
2019	Otha Seruppu Size 7	Tamil	National Film Award for Best Audiography
2020	Trance	Malayalam	
2021	Kaadan/ Aranya/ Haathi Mere Saathi	Tamil; Telugu; Hindi	
2021	Pushpa: The Rise	Telugu	
2022	Radhe Shyam	Telugu, Hindi	
2022	Shabaash Mithu	Hindi	
2024	Aadujeevitham	Malayalam	Kerala State Film Award For Best Sound Design
2024	Choo Mantar	Kannada	
2024	In the Belly of a Tiger	Hindi	
2024	Kanguva	Tamil	
2024	Pushpa 2: The Rule	Telugu	
2024	Baby John	Hindi	
2024	Vadakkan	Malayalam	
2025	Tanvi the Great	Hindi	
2026	Batwara 1947	Hindi	

=== As director ===
Year	Film	Language	Notes	Ref.
2023	Otta	Malayalam	Debut as a director	

== Awards ==
- 2024: Kerala State film Award for best Sound design for Aadujeevitham – The Goat Life
- 2019 : National Film Award for Best Audiography for his work in Oththa Seruppu Size 7
- 2019 : Golden Jury Film Award the best sound designing for Sax by Julius
- 2016 : Golden Reel award the best sound for documentary India's Daughter
- 2012 : Zee Cine Award for Best Sound Design for his work in Ra.One.
- 2010 : National Film Award for Best Audiography for his work in Pazhassi Raja
- 2010 : Honorary Doctorate (D.Litt.) by Sree Sankaracharya University of Sanskrit
- 2010 : Padma Shri by Government of India
- 2009 : Asianet Film Awards – Special Honour Jury Award
- 2009 : Chakkulathamma Swaravarsha Award
- 2009 : Bahadoor Award
- 2009 : Academy Award for Best Sound Mixing along with Ian Tapp and Richard Pryke for his work in Slumdog Millionaire.
- 2009 : BAFTA Award for Best Sound along with Glenn Freemantle, Richard Pryke, Tom Sayers and Ian Tapp for his work in Slumdog Millionaire.
- 2005 : Zee Cine Award for Best Audiography for his work in Musafir.

== See also ==
- List of Indian winners and nominees of the Academy Awards
