= Vilakkupara =

Vilakkupara വിളക്കുപാറ
- village
- Interactive map of Vilakkupara
- Coordinates: 8.942°N 76.985°E
- Country: India
- State: Kerala
- District: Kollam

Government
  - Body: Yeroor Panchayat

Languages
  - Official: Malayalam, English
- Time zone: UTC+5:30 (IST)
- PIN: 691312
- Telephone code: 0475
- Vehicle registration: KL-25
- Literacy: 98 %%
- Lok Sabha constituency: Kollam
- Civic agency: Yeroor Panchayat
- Website: [ www.kollam.nic.in/%20Kollam%20District]]

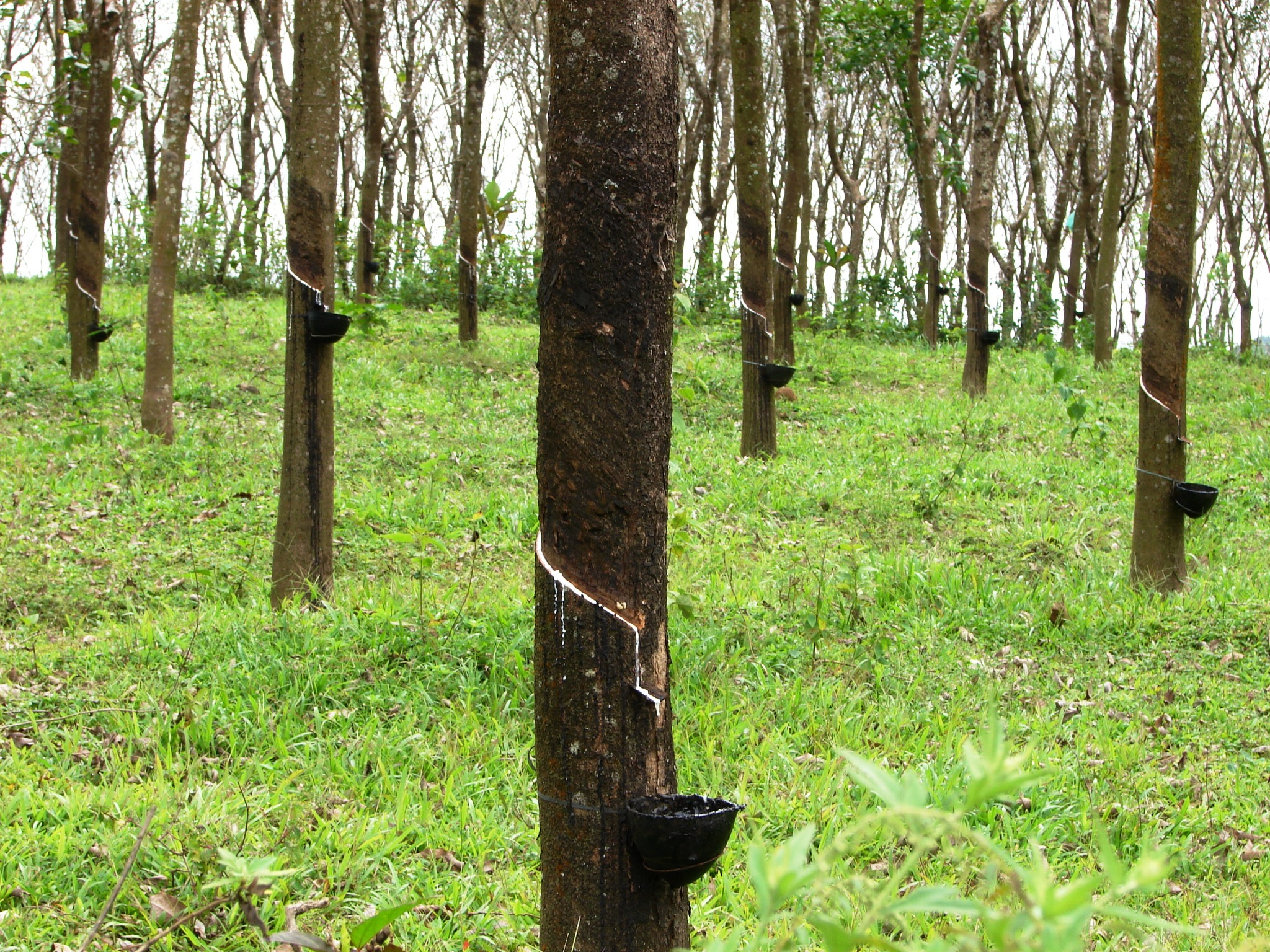
Rubber is generally cultivated in large plantations. See the coconut shell used in collecting latex, in plantations in Kerala, India

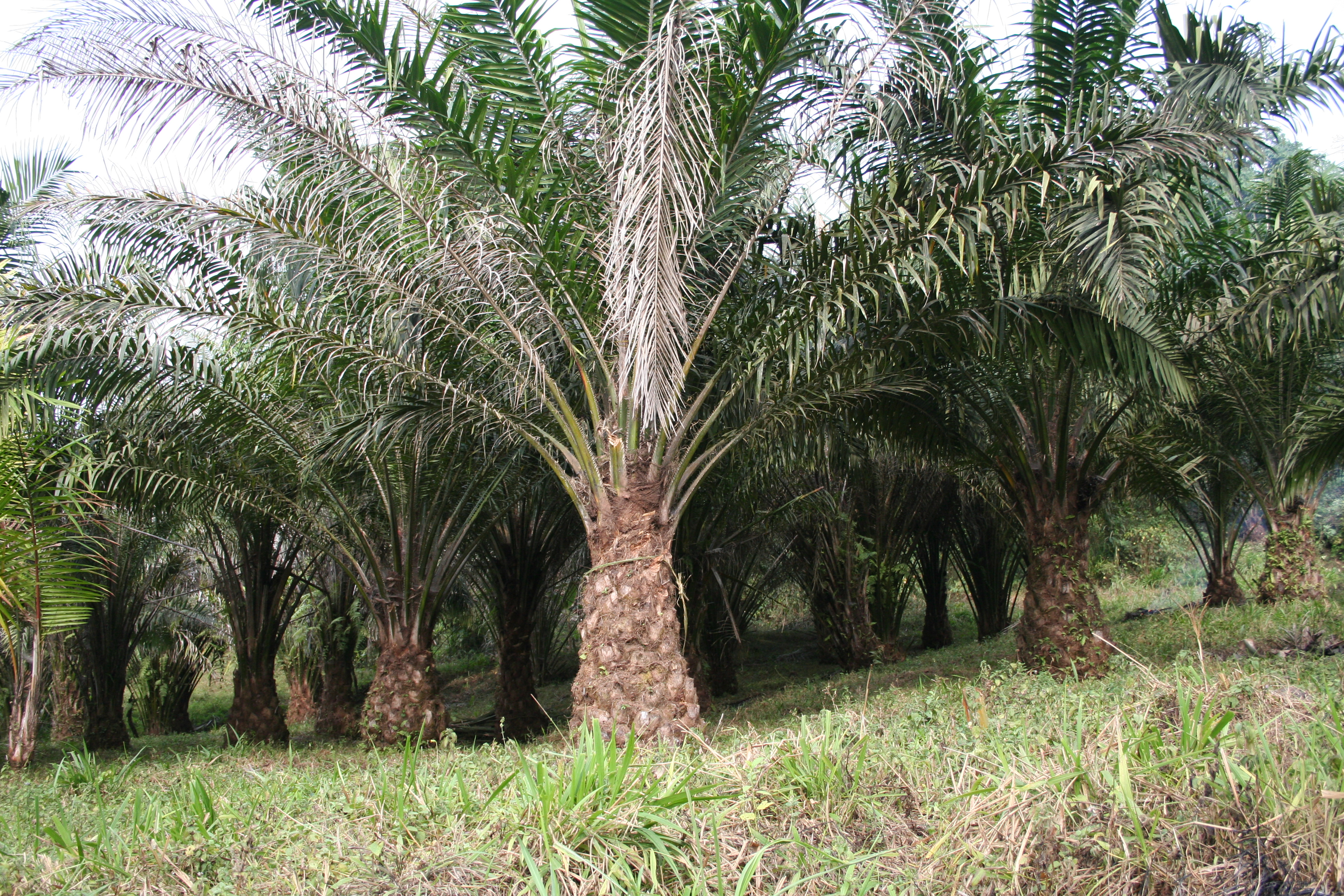
Oil palm tree

Vilakkupara is a village in Punalur Taluk, Kollam District, Kerala State, India. Vilakkupara lies 58 km (36 mi) to the east of Kollam, the District headquarters, and 12 km (7 mi) to the southeast of Punalur on Kollam-Thirumangalam National Highway (N.H-744). It is 72 km (45 mi) north of Thiruvananthapuram, the State Capital. It belongs to the Yeroor Gram panchayat, Punalur Assembly Constituency, and is a part of the Kollam Lok Sabha constituency.

== Etymology ==
Vilakkupara, a compound word made up of the words "Vilakku", meaning "Lamp", and "Para" meaning "Small Hill", literally means "Stone Lamp" in Malayalam "Kalvilakku".

== Economy ==
Main agricultural products of this township include rubber, palm oil, black pepper and other spices. The chief commodities of export here are the hill produces, pineapple, pepper products and timber. The main markets near to Vilakkupara is Anchal and Punalur.

== Oil Palm India Limited ==
Oil Palm India Limited was established in the year 1977 with the objective of propagating oil palm cultivation in the country and more particularly in Kerala. From 1983 onwards the Company started functioning as a joint venture of the Government of Kerala and Government of India with share participation of 51% and 49% respectively. The production Unit is Situated at Vilakkupara. The paid-up share capital of the company is Rs.11.78 Crores. Oil Palm India Limited has got a total planted area of 3646 Hect. of plantation spread over in three estates viz. Yeroor, Chithara and Kulathupuzha in Kollam District, Kerala. The total employee strength is 948.

Oil Palm is the richest source of oil. While Oil Palm can give around 3 to 5 Tons of oil per hectare, the yield per hectare of oil seeds like ground nut, sun flower, soybean, etc. would come to about 1 ton only. The cultivation of Oil Palm is commercially very much viable in comparison with other commercial crops like Rubber, Coconut etc.

== The Rehabilitation Plantations Ltd ==
The Rehabilitation Plantations Ltd., Punalur (RPL) started as a government rubber plantation scheme in 1972 for the settlement of Sri Lankan repatriates which was necessitated by Sirimao-Shastri Agreement of 1964. Later on it was formed into Government Company and incorporated on 5 May 1976. The authorised share capital of the company is Rs.350.00 lakhs and the paid up capital is Rs.339.27 lakhs. The share capital contribution of Government of India is 40% and remaining 60% was contributed by Government of Kerala.

The Company has settled 700 repatriate families from Sri Lanka. Two members from each family are provided with employment in the company. At present the company employs to 1300 workers, 185 staff members and 32 officers in the company.

== Plantations ==
Spanning over 2,070 hectares of leased government forest land, the plantation cultivates high-yielding rubber clones under the guidance of the Rubber Board of India and industry specialists.

== Notable people ==
- Resul Pookutty:- Winner of Academy Award for Best Sound Mixing along with Ian Tapp and Richard Pryke for his work in Slumdog Millionaire. He was born in Vilakkupara (anchal) about 58 km (36 mi) from Kollam, Kerala. He was the youngest of eight children born to an impoverished family. His father was a private bus ticket checker. Pookutty had to walk 6 km to the nearest school and study in the light of a kerosene lamp as his village had no electricity. He is a 1995 graduate from Film and Television Institute of India, Pune
- Binu Girija – An Indian American entrepreneur who is the founder and CEO of Way.com. In 2022, Way.com had achieved the 48th spot on the World's Top 100 Marketplaces list, a ranking of prominent consumer-facing startups and private companies. This list utilizes data from Bloomberg Second Measure, which analyzes purchase transactions to monitor consumer behavior in real-time. The fictional character of Erlich Bachman in the TV series Silicon Valley portrayed by TJ Miller is based on Girija's personality.

== Places of interest ==
Since Vilakkupara is situated on the foothills of Western Ghats, there are many places worth visiting:

- Thenmala: Thenmala is about 18 km (11 mi) from Vilakkupara on the Punalur - Tenkasi Highway. This is the first eco tourism project in India. The Thenmala dam was built across Kallada River. Thenmala is famous for being the shooting location in Malayalam and Tamil movies.

Thenmala attracts foreign and domestic tourists with a host of attractions. Boating on the lake, a rope bridge, trekking, mountaineering, biking and a musical fountain. Thenmala is approachable both from Trivandrum and Punalur by road. The waterfall called Palaruvi is a prime attraction nearby. Also nearby is a deer rehabilitation center where visitors can see deer in a forest setting and have a peep into a traditional tree house used by forest dwellers to escape harm from wild animals.

- Kulathupuzha:-Kulathupuzha is only 15 km (9 mi) from Vilakkupara. The famous Sastha (Lord Ayyappa) temple in kulathupuzha is visited by many pilgrims during Sabarimala season.
- Aryankavu: Aryankavu is about 34 km (21 mi) from Vilakkupara on the Punalur - Tenkasi Highway. There are many places of interest around this hilly village. Those are:
  - Palaruvi water falls - The Palaruvi Falls is located in the forest 5 km (3 mi) from Aryankavu vehicle check post. The name `PAL' means milk & `ARUVI'means stream.
  - Kadamanpara sandal forest -It is the second largest natural sandal forest after Marayoor. It is situated in aryankavu gramapanchaythu, 3 km (2 mi) from aryankavu junction
  - Bourdillon's plot - It is the world's first stump planted plantation of teak which located near the palaruvi water falls in aryankavu. A British man named Bordillon was its leader.
- The Punalur suspension bridge

Punalur town is 13 km (8 mi) from Vilakkupara. The Punalur suspension bridge crossing the Kallada river. It is the only suspended-deck type suspension bridge in south India. It was Built in 1877 by Albert Henry. This huge bridge was suspended by three spans. Up to very recent times it was used for vehicular movement.
