= Binu Girija =

Indian American entrepreneur

- Born: Kollam district, Kerala, India
- Occupation: Entrepreneur
- Employer(s): Computer Sciences Corporation; BEA Systems; Oracle Corporation
- Known for: Founding Way.com

Binu Girija is an Indian American entrepreneur. He is the founder and chief executive officer of Way.com, a car services platform that provides a range of services including insurance, finance, and other car-related services.

== Early life and education ==
Binu Girija was born in Vilakkupara, a village in the Kollam district of Kerala, India, to K. Thamarakshan and Baby Girija. His father was a civil engineer employed with the Kerala State Electricity Board. He earned his bachelor's degree in computer science and engineering from a university in India.

== Career ==
After graduation, Binu began his career at Computer Sciences Corporation as an enterprise architect, subsequently moving to BEA Systems and Oracle Corporation. His roles involved designing and managing infrastructure for various systems. He launched four startups, two of which were unsuccessful.

Girija founded Way.com in 2015. By 2022, the company had achieved the 48th spot on the World's Top 100 Marketplaces list, a ranking of prominent consumer-facing startups and private companies. This list utilizes data from Bloomberg Second Measure, which analyzes purchase transactions to monitor consumer behavior in real-time.

== In media ==
The fictional character of Erlich Bachman in the TV series Silicon Valley portrayed by TJ Miller is based on Girija's personality. But according to Girija, he is more self-deprecating than the character.
