= Victor J. Zolfo =

Set decorator

- Occupation: Set decorator
- Years active: 1987 – present

Victor J. Zolfo is a set decorator who has worked in the film industry since the late 1980s. Zolfo won the Academy Award for Best Art Direction and the BAFTA Award for Best Production Design for the 2008 film The Curious Case of Benjamin Button, sharing the awards for the film with art director and production designer Donald Graham Burt. He was also part of the 20-person team who won the Art Directors Guild's Excellence in Production Design Award for The Curious Case of Benjamin Button.

Zolfo is the son of an art director who worked at a publishing house in New York City. After Zolfo went to college, he worked as a set dresser in theater. He assisted set decorators in several films before entering the mainstream as a set decorator for Godzilla.

== Filmography ==
- Forever, Lulu (1987)
- Godzilla (1998)
- The Thirteenth Floor (1999)
- Mystery Men (1999)
- The Patriot (2000)
- The Time Machine (2002)
- Daredevil (2003)
- The Day After Tomorrow (2004)
- Mr. & Mrs. Smith (2005)
- Zodiac (2007)
- Yes Man (2008)
- The Curious Case of Benjamin Button (2008)
- Terminator Salvation (2009)
- The Social Network (2010)
- Real Steel (2011)
- The Avengers (2012)
- Blackhat (2015)
- The Fantastic Four (2015)
- Deepwater Horizon (2016)
- Alien: Covenant (2017)
- Gemini Man (2019)
