= Eddy Joseph =

British sound engineer (born 1945)

Edward George Burling Joseph
- Born: 5 June 1945 (age 80)
- Occupation: Sound engineer
- Years active: 1981–present

Eddy Joseph (born 5 June 1945) is a British sound engineer.

== Early life and education ==
Joseph was born in 1945, the son of a film producer Edward 'Teddy' Joseph who produced What a Whopper. Eddy was educated at Abingdon School from 1957 until 1962.

== Career ==
Joseph began work with Baker and Todman Accountants before joining the film industry in 1967 and becoming a sound editor in 1981.

== Awards ==
In 1982, Joseph won the BAFTA award for Best Sound, for Pink Floyd's 'The Wall'. In 2006, he repeated the earlier success by winning the BAFTA award for Best Sound once again, this time for Casino Royale.

== Nominations ==
Joseph has received a further six BAFTA nominations

- The Commitments in 1992
- Evita in 1997
- Harry Potter and the Philosopher's Stone in 2002
- Cold Mountain in 2004
- United 93 in 2007
- Quantum of Solace in 2009

In addition he has also received 16 MPSE Motion Picture Sound Editors of America nominations.

== See also ==
- List of Old Abingdonians
