= Richard Pryke =

British sound engineer

- Occupation: Sound engineer
- Years active: 1993–present

Richard Pryke is a British sound engineer. He won an Academy Award for Best Sound for the film Slumdog Millionaire. He has worked on over 80 films since 1993.

== Selected filmography ==
- Bird Box (2018)
- First They Killed My Father (2017)
- Cinderella (2015)
- 127 Hours (2010)
- Never Let Me Go
- Nanny McPhee and the Big Bang (2010)
- Nine (2009)
- Slumdog Millionaire (2008)
- Sunshine (2007)
- V for Vendetta (2005)
- Die Another Day (2002)
- Bridget Jones's Diary (2001)
- Conspiracy (2001)
- The World Is Not Enough (1999)
- Tomorrow Never Dies (1997)
