= Tom Sayers (sound editor) =

Sound editor

- Occupation: Sound editor
- Years active: 1997–present

Tom Sayers is a sound editor. He was nominated at the 81st Academy Awards in the category of Best Sound Editing for the film Slumdog Millionaire. He shared his nomination with Glenn Freemantle.

== Selected filmography ==
- Cinderella (2015)
- Dark Shadows (2012)
- Gnomeo & Juliet (2011)
- An Education (2009)
- Slumdog Millionaire (2008)
- Bridget Jones's Diary (2001)
- Wing Commander (1999)
