= Ian Tapp =

English sound engineer

- Occupation: Sound engineer
- Years active: 1987-present

Ian Tapp is an English sound engineer. He won an Oscar for Best Sound Mixing for the film Slumdog Millionaire. He has worked on over 120 films since 1987.

== Selected filmography ==
- Slumdog Millionaire (2008)
