= Glenn Freemantle =

British sound editor and designer

- Occupations: Sound editor and designer
- Years active: 1981–present

Glenn Freemantle is a British sound editor and sound designer.

== Career ==
Freemantle was nominated at the 81st Academy Awards for Best Sound Editing for his work on the film Slumdog Millionaire. He received a second nomination and his first win in the same category for Gravity at the 86th Academy Awards.

Freemantle has over 130 credits since his start in 1981.
