= SoundStorm (company) =

- Formerly: Wallaworks, Gordon Ecker Productions
- Type: Private
- Industry: post-production, Sound effects, Sound editing and Remastering
- Founder: Gordon Ecker
- Headquarters: 639 S. Glenwood Place, Burbank, USA
- Area served: USA
- Key people: Rob Nokes, Bruce Stambler, John Leveque
- Owner: Sounddogs.com, Inc.
- Website: www.soundstorm.com

SoundStorm was an independent audio post-production and sound editorial company based in Burbank, California. It provided post-production sound design, sound editing and ADR in Hollywood. The editors recorded their sound effect library from 1984 to 2004, worked on more than eighty feature films, and earned a number of awards and nominations from the Academy Awards, Emmy Awards, British Academy Film Awards and Golden Reel Awards. In 2004, the company was dissolved and sold its assets; Soundogs.com Inc. acquired the trademark and complete archive of the SoundStorm sound effects library.

== History ==
SoundStorm was founded in 1984 by Gordon Ecker as Walla Works Productions, a sound editorial house and post-production facility in Los Angeles for feature films and television projects. It was owned and operated by practicing sound professionals. In the 1990s the company moved to Burbank from Hollywood after several corporate transitions and name changes. Ecker who was the CEO, retired in 1998 and sold the company to six of the firm's original employees; Bruce Stambler, John Leveque, Gary Blufer, John Fanaris, Becky Sullivan, and Richard Yawn. Four of the six owners were sound editors. The company developed relationships with off-site editorial and mixing facilities to handle re-recording duties on SoundStorm projects. In 2002, it employed about sixty sound professionals, including ten supervising sound editors. The company also recruited Alan Robert Murray who supervised the sound on twenty-eight Clint Eastwood films.

The SoundStorm team worked on more than eighty feature films and television projects. It has contributed to the success of notable films as Under Siege (1992), The Fugitive (1993), Clear and Present Danger (1994), Batman Forever (1995), The Ghost and the Darkness (1996), L.A. Confidential (1997) and The Fast and the Furious (2001)

Besides the action-adventure work, SoundStorm provided sound editorial for independent dramas like Frailty (2001), comedies like Blast from the Past (1999), and prestigious pictures like Pleasantville (1998)

The leading supervising sound editors John Leveque and Bruce Stambler paired together on several projects and achieved a number of awards for sound designing and editing. Stambler was nominated for five in a row for the Academy Award and won with Ghost and the Darkness (1995) for Best Sound Effects Editing. He also won a BAFTA for The Fugitive (1993), an Emmy Award for Miami Vice (1984) and a Golden Reel Award shared with Leveque for Under Siege (1992). John Leveque received Oscar nominations four years in a row and won two BAFTAs for L.A. Confidential (1997) and The Fugitive (1993) He was also nominated for five Golden Reel Awards.

In 2003, SoundStorm digitized its sound effects library, opened a new sound transfer room featuring Pro Tools HD systems and digital workstations replacing 35mm platforms with a view to coping with the rival firms. In 2004, SoundStorm opened Cloud 9, a sound mixer feature equipped with two dbx Quantum II compressors, two dbx 160SL dual/mono stereo compressor/limiters and a dbx 786 mic pre unit.

== Acquisition ==
Rob Nokes at SoundStorm Sound Effects Library Storage

SoundStorm was one of the most recognized independent sound editorial companies in Hollywood when it filed for bankruptcy and sold its assets in 2004. Bruce Stambler, one of its co-founders, left SoundStorm for Soundelux in August 2004 with eight members of his creative team and three studio projects. Stambler was CEO of SoundStorm and lead supervising sound editor at the firm before relocating to Soundelux.

In 2004, John Leveque also left SoundStorm for Soundelux and started working for Soundelux' London office. Soundelux has also brought on Sound Supervisor/ADR supervisor Becky Sullivan.

In 2004 Rob Nokes of Sounddogs.com Inc. acquired the trademark and complete archive of the SoundStorm sound effects library when the company decided to dissolve its sell its assets and partnerships with other sound facilities.

== Aftermath ==
In 2008, Stambler and Leveque left Soundelux and opened a sound editorial and mixing facility called Studio 8 Sound in Los Angeles with offices also in New York.

== Staff ==
Former staffs

- Gordon Ecker, Co-founder, Supervising sound editor (1984–1998)
- John Fanaris, President.
- John Switzer, Vice President
- Charles Meister, former CEO
- Bruce Stambler, Co-CEO, Supervising sound editor
- John Leveque, Supervising sound editor
- Becky Sullivan, Co-CEO owner Supervising Sound Editor
- Richard E. Yawn, Sound editor
- Gary Blufer, Sound effects recordist, editor
- Alan Robert Murray, Supervising sound editor
- Tim Walston, Sound designer
- Terry Rodman, Supervising sound editor
- Jay Nierenberg, Supervising sound editor
- Michael Olman, Sound mixer
- Michael Payne, Sound effect editor
- Steve Mann, Sound effect editor
- William Dotson, Supervising sound editor
- Cathie Speakman, Supervising sound editor
- Bernard Weiser, Supervising sound editor
- Lee Lemont, Supervising sound editor
- Glenn Hoskinson, Sound effect editor

== Filmography ==
- Life of the Party (2005) ... Sound Editing Services
- Noel (2004) ... Sound Editing
- Collateral (2004) ... Sound Effects Editing
- Cape of Good Hope (2004) ... Mixed At
- The Girl Next Door (2004) ... Sound Post-production
- Club Dread (2004) ... Sound Editing And Re-recording
- Miracle (2004) ... Sound Editing
- Torque (2004) ... Sound Post-production
- Eloise at Christmastime (2003) (TV series) ... Post Production Sound
- American Valor (2003) (TV series) ... Sound Editing
- Elf (2003) ... Sound Editing
- Miss Match (2003) ... Sound Editorial
- Hollywood Homicide (2003) ... Sound Editing
- Carolina (2003) ... Sound Editing, Sound Editorial And Re-recording
- Top Speed (2003) ... Assistant Sound Effects Editing
- Bulletproof Monk (2003) ... Sound Post-production
- Holes (2003) ... Sound Post-production
- The Core (2003) ... Sound Editing
- Dark Blue (2002) ... Sound Editing
- Star Trek: Nemesis (2002) ... Sound Editing
- Waking Up in Reno (2002) ... Sound Design
- Trapped (2002) ... Sound Design & Editorial
- Ritual (2002) ... Sound Editing
- The Banger Sisters (2002) ... Sound Design & Editorial
- xXx (2002) ... Sound Editorial Services
- Blood Work (2002) ... Sound Editing
- No Good Deed (2002) ... Sound Editing
- Juwanna Mann (2002) ... Sound Editing
- The Sum of All Fears (2002) ... Digital Sound Editing
- Papal Cab (2002) ... Audio Services
- One Hour Photo (2002) ... Digital Sound Design And Editing
- Queen of the Damned (2002) ... Sound Editing
- Frailty (2001) ... Sound Design And Editorial
- To End All Wars (2001) ... Sound Editorial
- The Fast and the Furious (2001) ... Sound Editing
- Lara Croft: Tomb Raider (2001) ... Sound Editing
- What's the Worst That Could Happen? (2001) ... Sound Editing Services
- The Caveman's Valentine (2001) ... Sound Editing
- 24 (2001–2010) ... Sound Editing
- Dude, Where's My Car? (2000) ... Sound Editing
- Bad Dog (2000) ... Sound Editing
- Dancing at the Blue Iguana (2000) ... Sound Design And Editorial
- The Replacements (2000) ... Sound Editing
- The Adventures of Rocky and Bullwinkle (2000) ... Sound Editing
- Scary Movie (2000) ... Sound Editorial Services
- Nurse Betty (2000) ... Sound Editing
- Where the Money Is (2000) ... Editing Facilities
- Son of the Beach (2000) ... Sound Post-production
- The Next Best Thing (2000) ... Sound Editing
- The Magic of Marciano (2000) ... Sound Editing
- South of Heaven, West of Hell (2000) ... Sound Design And Editorial
- Flawless (1999) ... Sound Editing
- Durango Kids (1999) ... Sound Re-recording
- Three Kings (1999) ... Sound Editing
- Simpatico (1999) ... Sound Editing By
- Dudley Do-Right (1999) ... Sound Editing
- Twin Falls Idaho (1999) ... Post Sound Editorial Facilities
- The 13th Warrior (1999) ... Sound Editing
- 200 Cigarettes (1999) ... Sound Editing
- 8MM (1999) ... Sound Editing
- Blast from the Past (1999) ... Sound Editing
- Water and Power (1999) ... Sound Editorial
- Pleasantville (1998) ... Sound Editing
- Quest for Camelot (1998) ... Sound Editing
- U.S. Marshals (1998) ... Sound Editing
- In Quiet Night (1998) ... Sound
- Tina Gets Her Man (1998) ... Special Thanks
- The Postman (1997) ... Sound Editing
- Speed 2: Cruise Control (1997) ... Sound Editing
- Batman & Robin (1997) ... Sound Editing
- L.A. Confidential (1997) ... Sound Editing (as Soundstorm)
- Absolute Power (1997) ... Sound Editing
- Gridlock'd (1997) ... Sound Editing
- The Ghost and the Darkness (1996) ... Sound Editing
- A Time to Kill (1996) ... Sound Editing
- Carpool (1996) ... Sound Editing
- Four Rooms (1995) ... Post-production Sound
- Dangerous Minds (1995) ... Sound Editing
- Batman Forever (1995) ... Sound Editing
- Clear and Present Danger (1994) ... Sound Effects Editing
- Dream Lover (1993) ... Sound Editing
- The Program (1993) ... Sound Editing
- Body Bags (1993) (TV series) ... Sound Editing
- The Fugitive (1993) ... Sound Editing
- Posse (1993) ... Sound Editing
- Under Siege (1992) ... Sound Editing
- Miami Vice (1984) ... Sound Editing

== Awards and recognitions ==
Year	Award	Category	Type	Title	Honorees
2002	Golden Reel Award	Best Sound Editing	Nominated	xXx	Bruce Stambler, Richard E. Yawn, Mike Chock, Harry Cohen, Ken Fischer, Elliott Koretz; Steve Mann, Steve Nelson, Michael Payne; Kim Secrist, Tim Walston, Michael Dressel
2002	Golden Reel Award	Best Sound Editing	Nominated	Lara Croft: Tomb Raider	Alan Robert Murray, Steve Boeddeker, Bub Asman, Thomas Small, Ronald Eng, Doug Jackson; Michael Jonascu, Chuck Michael, David Grimaldi
2001	Golden Reel Award	Best Sound Editing	Nominated	Freedom Song	John Leveque, Shawn Sykora, Steve Mann, Anthony Milch
2001	Golden Reel Award	Best Sound Editing	Nominated	Three Kings	John Leveque, Richard E. Yawn, Gary Blufer, Bruce Fortune, Shawn Sykora, Anthony Milch, Terry Rodman, Michael Dressel, Bob Beher
2001	Golden Reel Award	Best Sound Editing	Nominated	The Fast and the Furious	Bruce Stambler, Becky Sullivan, Jay Nierenberg, Michael Dressel, Steve Mann, Glenn Hoskinson; Tim Walston, Charles Deenen, Scott Curtis
2001	Academy Award	Best Sound Editing	Nominated	Space Cowboys	Alan Robert Murray, Bub Asman
1997	BAFTA Award	Best Sound	Won	L.A. Confidential	John Leveque, Terry Rodman, Roland N. Thai, Kirk Francis, Andy Nelson, Anna Behlmer
1997	Independent Spirit Awards		Nominated	Eve's Bayou	
1996	Academy Award	Best Sound Editing	Won	The Ghost and the Darkness	Bruce Stambler
1995	Academy Award	Best Sound Editing	Nominated	Batman Forever	John Leveque, Bruce Stambler
1995	Golden Reel Award	Best Sound Editing	Nominated	Clear and Present Danger	Bruce Stambler, John Leveque, Lance Brown, Jay Nierenberg, Glenn Hoskinson, Frank Howard, Steve Mann, Jeffrey L. Sandler, David E. Stone, Donald L. Warner, Pamela Bentkowski Jr.
1994	Academy Award	Best Sound Editing	Nominated	Clear and Present Danger	John Leveque, Bruce Stambler
1994	Golden Reel Award	Best Sound Editing	Nominated	Posse	Bruce Stambler, Richard E. Yawn, Lance Brown; Anthony Milch, Jay Nierenberg, Shawn Sykora
1994	Golden Reel Award	Best Sound Editing	Nominated	The Fugitive	Bruce Stambler, John Leveque, Jay Nierenberg; Lance Brown, Hector C. Gika, Glenn Hoskinson; Shawn Sykora, Marshall Winn, Steve Schwalbe
1993	BAFTA Award	Best Sound	Won	The Fugitive	John Leveque, Bruce Stambler, Becky Sullivan Scott Smith, Donald Mitchell, Michael Herbick, Frank Montaño
1993	Academy Award	Best Sound Editing	Nominated	The Fugitive	John Leveque, Bruce Stambler
1992	Academy Award	Best Sound Editing	Nominated	Under Siege	John Leveque, Bruce Stambler
1992	Golden Reel Award	Best Sound Editing	Won	Under Siege	John Leveque, Bruce Stambler, Becky Sullivan, Richard E. Yawn, Jay Nierenberg, Hector C. Gika, Donald Warner Jr., Glenn Hoskinson, Bruce Fortune
1986	Emmy Award	Outstanding Sound Editing for a Series	Nominated	Misfits of Science	Bruce Stambler, Kyle Wright, Bruce Bell, Barney Cabral, Phil Haberman, Mark Hollingsworth; Donlee Jorgensen, Jimmy Ling, Bernard F. Pincus
1985	Emmy Award	Outstanding Sound Editing for a Series	Won	Miami Vice	Bruce Stambler, Charles E. Moran, Bruce Bell, Victor Lackey, Ian MacGregor-Scott, Carl Mahakian; John Oettinger, Bernard Pincus, Warren Smith
