= Sounddogs =

Sounddogs.com
- Website type: Sound effects library, production music library
- Available in: English
- Headquarters: Richmond Hill, Ontario, Canada
- Country of origin: Canada
- Area served: Worldwide
- Owner: Sound Ideas
- Website: www.sounddogs.com
- Launched: May 1, 1997; 29 years ago
- Current status: Active

Sounddogs.com, Inc. is a commercial online library of sound effects based in Marina Del Rey, California, with offices in Canada, Argentina, and Uruguay. It is the first and largest online sound effects and production music library on the internet launched in May 1997. As of 2016, 708,636 sound effects and production music tracks are available for immediate download or on hard drive or CD. Downloads are available in AIFF, WAV, and MP3 formats. Sounddogs started as a sound design and editorial company in 1990 and has contributed to more than 150 feature films and earned multiple awards and nominations from the BAFTA Award, Primetime Emmy Award and Golden Reel Awards. As of 2022, there are over 1 million sound files of sound effects and production music.

== Company history ==
In 1990, Gregory King and Nelson Ferrera formed the original Sound Dogs Inc. as a sound editorial company in Toronto, Canada. In 1991, Robert Nokes was appointed as an assistant of King. In 1995 Greg King moved to Los Angeles along with Rob Nokes. Paul Huntsman of Todd-AO introduced them to Robert Grieve, who six years earlier had declined to become a founding partner of Soundelux. Together they formed "Sound Dogs USA" in Los Angeles, California. After a year, they launched Sounddogs.com on May 1, 1997, a large online sound effects archive as a marketing tool with Picture Editors. In 1998 they received invitation for a meeting with Kleiner Perkins, a Silicon Valley Venture Capital firm. They later worked with giant companies like Apple, Microsoft, Sun Microsystems, Avid Technology, and Digital River. Around 1999, Nelson Ferreira partnered with Stephen Barden at Sound Dogs Toronto. In late 2001, Sound Dogs Inc. (King, Grieve) and Sounddogs.com (Nokes) split amicably and remain close working partners. Sound Dogs New York was started by Stephen Barden around 2005. In the late 2000s King formed a sound design firm called The Dawgs Sound Design, which later became King SoundWorks. Currently, there are three separately owned Sounddogs companies: Sounddogs.com, owned by Rob Nokes; King SoundWorks (formally known as SoundDogs USA), owned by Greg King and SoundDogs Canada, owned by Nelson Ferreira.

On June 1, 2019, Sound Ideas purchased SoundDogs.com together with the entirety of the sound effects library owned by Rob Nokes, Soundelux, SounDogs Library, and SoundStorm.

== Content partners ==
Since 2001, the company signed co-distribution deal and partnerships with many sound designer and companies with a view to providing the best selection possible. Partners of SoundDogs include: Charles Maynes, Elliot Koretz, AMG, Bobby Mackston, Casablanca, Coll Anderson, Copra Studios, Craig Henighan, Dan O’Connell, Digiffects, The Hollywood Edge, Elements, Farts Dot Com, Hanna Barbera, Interplay, Nightingale Mobile, Nightingale Voice Box, Nokes Library, Point One Sound, Ripe, Rob Nokes Horse Racing Collection, Sonic Science, Sound Ideas SFX, Sound HOG, Sound Label, Sonospheres, SoundDogs, Soundminer, The Anarchist Cookbook, The Recordist, Tomahawk Films, Trak Works, Valentino, and Zak Sound.

== Acquisition ==
Rob Nokes at SoundStorm Sound Effects Library Storage

In November 2004, Rob Nokes acquired the sound library and trademark of SoundStorm, a sound editorial company nominated for eight Academy Awards. SoundStorm's corporate predecessor was a company called Walla Works, which had employed the founding partners of Soundelux, another sound editorial company. On November 17, 2014, the Todd-Soundelux Trademarks (Todd AO and Soundelux) and Copyrights (Sound Effects Library) were also acquired in Federal Bankruptcy Court by Rob Nokes of Sounddogs.com, Inc. Nokes purchased all of Todd-Soundelux's library assets and trademarks, which included The Hollywood Edge. In January 2020, Sound Ideas finished acquiring Sounddogs.com.

== Staff ==
- Brian Nimens, President and CEO, Sound recordist (2019–Present)
- Craig Nimens, Vice-President (2019–Present)
- Rob Nokes, President and Founder, Sound recordist, Supervising sound editor (1995–2019)

Former staffs

- Rob Nokes, Co-Founder, Supervising sound editor (1997-2019)
- Gregory King, Co founder, Supervising sound editor (1990-2001)
- Nelson Ferreira, Co founder, Supervising sound editor (1990-1999)
- Robert Grieve, Supervising sound editor
- Craig Henighan, Supervising sound editor
- Stephen Barden, Supervising sound editor
- Yann Delpuech, Supervising sound editor
- Darren King, Supervising sound editor
- Paula Fairfield, Sound effect editor
- John Switzer, Former Vice president
- Paul Virostek, Former Vice president

== Filmography ==
- Backstrom (2015) ... Supervising sound editor (12 episodes)
- Big Sky (2015) ... Sound library
- The Rover (2014) ... Field sound effects
- Bones (2005-2015) (TV Series) ... Supervising sound editor (204 episodes)
- Salem (2014) ... Supervising sound editor (2 episodes)
- Noah (2014) ... Field sound effects
- Someone Marry Barry (2014) ... Supervising sound editor
- Planes (2013) ... Supervising sound editor
- The Finder (2012) ... Supervising sound editor (6 episodes)
- Prince of Persia: The Sands of Time (2010) ... Field sound effects
- We Bought a Zoo (2010) ... Sound effects recording
- Insidious (2010) ... ADR mixing
- The Princess and the Frog (2009) ... Sound effects field recording
- Ghosts of Girlfriends Past (2009) ... Sound effects field recording
- X-Men Origins: Wolverine (2009) ... Sound effects field recording
- Race to Witch Mountain (2009) ... Sound effects field recording
- Jonas Brothers: The 3D Concert Experience (2009) ... Sound effects field recording
- Beverly Hills Chihuahua (2008) ... Sound effects recording
- The X Files: I Want to Believe (2008) ... Sound effects recording
- Generation Kill (2008) ... Sound effects recording
- The Spiderwick Chronicles (2008) ... Sound effects field recording
- Hannah Montana & Miley Cyrus: Best of Both Worlds Concert (2008) ... Sound effects field recording
- John Adams (2008 TV Miniseries) ... Additional sound design (2 episodes)
- The Game Plan (2007) ... Sound effects field recording
- 3:10 to Yuma (2007) ... Sound effects field recording
- Mongol (2007) ... Additional sound effects library
- Fantastic Four: Rise of the Silver Surfer (2007) ... Sound effects field recording
- Blue State (2007) ... Sound effects recording
- Blades of Glory (2007) ... Sound effects field recording
- Because I Said So (2007) ... Sound effects field recording
- Broken English (2007) ... Supervising sound editor
- The Fountain (2006) ... Supervising sound editor
- The Santa Clause 3: The Escape Clause (2006) ... Additional sound effects library
- Flicka (2006) ... Additional sound effects library
- The Guardian (2006) ... Sound effects field recording
- Gridiron Gang (2006) ... Additional sound recording
- Invincible (2006) ... Field recording
- The Host (2006) ... Additional sound effects
- The Shaggy Dog (2006) ... Field recording
- Glory Road (2006) ... Additional sound recording
- Cheong yeon (2005) ... Additional sound
- Stealth (2005) ... sound effects recording
- Just Friends (2005) ... Supervising sound editor
- Dreamer (2005) ... Additional sound recording
- The Dukes of Hazzard (2005) ... Sound effects editing
- Nomad (2005 film) (2005) ... Supervising sound editor
- Million Dollar Baby (2004) ... Additional sound recording
- Miracle (2004) ... Supervising sound editor
- Seabiscuit (2003) ... Additional sound
- Frankie and Johnny Are Married (2003) ... Supervising sound editor
- My Baby's Daddy (2003) ... Supervising sound editor
- Big Momma's House (2003) ... Supervising sound editor
- Red Dragon (2002) ... Supervising sound editor
- Ali (2001) ... Post sound technical planning
- The Road to El Dorado (2000) ... Supervising sound editor
- Requiem for a Dream (2000) ... Supervising sound editor, Sound effect
- Fantasia 2000 (2000) ... Supervising sound editor
- The Family Man (2000) ... Supervising sound editor
- Return to Me (2000) ... Supervising sound editor
- Dungeons & Dragons (2000) ... Supervising sound editor
- The Insider (1999) ... Supervising sound editor
- Mumford (1999) ... Supervising sound editor
- Dick (1999) ... Sound design
- Water Damage (1999) ... Sound editing
- Bride of Chucky (1998) ... Supervising sound editor
- Very Bad Things (1998) ... Supervising sound editor
- Jack Frost (1997) ... Supervising sound editor
- Turbulence (1997) ... Supervising sound editor
- Waiting for Guffman (1996) ... Post sound technical
- Ghosts of Mississippi (1996) ... Supervising sound editor
- The Cable Guy (1996) ... Supervising sound editor
- The Harvest (1993) ... Supervising sound editor
- Dark Horse (1992) ... Supervising sound editor
- Dracula: The Series (1990) ... Supervising sound editor

== Awards and recognitions ==
Year	Award	Category	Type	Title	Honorees	Ref(s)
2015	Canadian Screen Award	Best Sound Editing	Won	Pompeii	Stephen Barden, Steve Baine, Kevin Banks, Alex Bullick, J.R. Fountain, Jill Purdy, Fred Brennan, Kevin Howard	
2015	DGC Craft Award	Sound Editing	Won	Pompeii	Kevin Banks, Stephen Barden, Fred Brennan, Alex Bullick, J.R. Fountain, Rose Gregoris, Kevin Howard, Jill Purdy, Tyler Whitham	
2014	Satellite Awards	Best Sound	Nominated	Noah	Craig Henighan, Ken Ishii, Skip Lievsay	
2014	HPA Awards	Best Sound	Nominated	Noah	Craig Henighan, Jill Purdy, Skip Lievsay	
2014	Canadian Screen Award	Best Sound Editing	Won	The Mortal Instruments: City of Bones	Nelson Ferreira, Stephen Barden, Alex Bullick, Christian Schaanning, J.R. Fountain, Jill Purdy, Kevin Banks, Nathan Robitaille, Steve Baine	
2014	DGC Craft Award	Sound Editing	Won	The Mortal Instruments: City of Bones	Kevin Banks, Alex Bullick, Stephen Barden, Nelson Ferreira, J.R. Fountain, Rose Gregoris, Jill Purdy, Nathan Robitaille, Tyler Whitham	
2014	Golden Reel Award	Best Sound Editing	Nominated	Planes	Rob Nokes, Todd Toon, Thomas Whiting, Charles Ritter, Jeff Sawyer, Pernell Salinas	
2013	Canadian Screen Award	Best Sound Editing	Nominated	Resident Evil: Retribution	Stephen Barden, Kevin Banks, Steve Baine, Alex Bullick, Jill Purdy	
2013	DGC Craft Award	Sound Editing	Won	Resident Evil: Retribution	Kevin Banks, Stephen Barden, Alex Bullick, Rose Gregoris, Dashen Naidoo, Jill Purdy	
2013	Golden Reel Award	Best Sound Editing	Nominated	Moonrise Kingdom	Craig Henighan, Lewis Goldstein, David Briggs, Jac Rubenstein, Cate Montana	
2012	Satellite Awards	Best Sound	Nominated	Snow White and the Huntsman	Craig Henighan, Andy Nelson, Chris Munro	
2011	BAFTA Film Award	Best Sound	Nominated	Black Swan	Craig Henighan, Ken Ishii, Dominick Tavella	
2011	Online Film & Television Association Award	Best Sound Mixing	Nominated	Black Swan	Craig Henighan, Ken Ishii, Dominick Tavella	
2011	Golden Reel Award	Best Sound Editing	Nominated	Black Swan	Craig Henighan, Brian Emrich, Steve Baine, Wayne Lemmer	
2011	Critics' Choice Movie Award	Best Sound	Nominated	Black Swan	Craig Henighan, Brian Emrich	
2011	Cinema Audio Society Awards	Best Sound Mixing	Nominated	Black Swan	Craig Henighan, Ken Ishii, Dominick Tavella	
2011	DGC Craft Award	Sound Editing	Nominated	Resident Evil: Afterlife	Stephen Barden, Jill Purdy, Kevin Banks, Alex Bullick, Rose Gregoris, Tyler Whitham	
2011	Genie Awards	Best Sound Editing	Nominated	Resident Evil: Afterlife	Stephen Barden, Steve Baine, Kevin Banks, Alex Bullick, Jill Purdy	
2011	Golden Reel Award	Best Sound Editing	Won	Love	Craig Henighan, Bob Kellough, Steve Baine, Andy Koyama	
2011	Golden Reel Award	Best Sound Editing	Won	Rush: Beyond the Lighted Stage	Stephen Barden, David Rose, Andrew Wright	
2010	Gemini Awards	Best Sound	Nominated	Durham County	Stephen Barden, Brad Thornton, Jill Purdy, Steve Baine, Alex Bullick, Keith Elliott, Yann Cleary	
2009	DGC Craft Award	Sound Editing	Won	Death Race	Stephen Barden, Jill Purdy, Alex Bullick, Rose Gregoris, Tyler Whitham	
2008	Gemini Awards	Best Sound	Won	Across the River to Motor City	Stephen Barden, Nelson Ferreira, Steve Baine, Alex Bullick, Eric Fitz, Andrew Tay	
2006	Golden Reel Award	Best Sound Editing	Nominated	Sin City	Craig Henighan, Tim Rakoczy, William Jacobs, Paula Fairfield, Carla Murray, Edward Steidele, Jerry Trent	
2006	DGC Craft Award	Sound Editing	Won	The Fountain	Stephen Barden, Alex Bullick, Jill Purdy, Nelson Ferreira, Craig Henighan	
2006	Golden Reel Award	Best Sound Editing	Nominated	Cypher	Craig Henighan, Stephen Barden, Tom Kramer, Joe Bracciale, Jill Purdy	
2006	DGC Craft Award	Outstanding Sound Editing	Nominated	Land of the Dead	Kevin Banks, Nelson Ferreira, Craig Henighan, Lee de Lang, Jill Purdy, Nathan Robitaille	
2006	Golden Reel Award	Best Sound Editing	Nominated	Nothing	Stephen Barden, Kevin Banks, Jill Purdy, John Sievert	
2005	DGC Craft Award	Outstanding Sound Editing	Won	Assault on Precinct 13	Kevin Banks, Craig Henighan, Lee de Lang, Jill Purdy, Nathan Robitaille	
2005	Genie Awards	Best Sound Editing	Won	Resident Evil: Apocalypse	Steve Baine, Stephen Barden, Tony Lewis, Craig Henighan, Jill Purdy, Nathan Robitaille	
2005	DGC Craft Award	Outstanding Sound Editing	Nominated	Resident Evil: Apocalypse	Stephen Barden, Craig Henighan, Kevin Banks, Joe Bracciale, Lee de Lang, Jill Purdy, Nathan Robitaille	
2005	Golden Reel Award	Best Sound Editing	Nominated	Hollywood North	Craig Henighan, Nelson Ferreira, Kevin Banks	
2004	Golden Reel Award	Best Sound Editing	Nominated	Dreamcatcher	Robert Grieve, Yann Delpuech, Wayne Griffin, Darren King	
2004	DGC Craft Award	Outstanding Sound Editing	Nominated	Nothing	Kevin Banks, Stephen Barden, Jill Purdy, Craig Henighan	
2003	DGC Craft Award	Outstanding Sound Editing	Nominated	Kart Racer	Stephen Barden, Rob Bertola, Craig Henighan, Tony Currie, Kevin Banks, J.R. Fountain, Mark Gingras	
2003	DGC Craft Award	Outstanding Sound Editing	Nominated	Men with Brooms	Stephen Barden, Kevin Banks, Joe Bracciale, Jill Purdy	
2002	Gemini Awards	Best Sound	Won	Tracker	Stephen Barden, Steve Baine, Kevin Banks, Elius Caruso, Joe Lafontaine, Robert Scherer, Brad Zoern	
2002	Golden Reel Award	Best Sound Editing	Nominated	RoboCop: Prime Directives	Craig Henighan, Stephen Barden, Kevin Banks, J.R. Fountain, Joe Bracciale, Stephen Roque	
2002	Genie Awards	Best Sound Editing	Won	Treed Murray	Stephen Barden, Kevin Banks, Joe Bracciale, John Sievert, Virginia Storey	
2001	Primetime Emmy Award	Outstanding Sound Editing	Won	61*	Robert Grieve, Scott M. Silvey, Meg Taylor, Wayne Griffin, Stephanie Lowry, Ellen Heuer	
2001	Golden Reel Award	Best Sound Editing	Nominated	The Insider	Gregory King, Gregg Baxter, Stephanie Flack, Mary Ruth Smith, Darren King, Linda Folk	
2001	Golden Reel Award	Best Sound Editing	Nominated	Requiem for a Dream	Stephen Barden, Nelson Ferreira, Craig Henighan, Jill Purdy	
2001	Golden Reel Award	Best Sound Editing	Nominated	The Road to El Dorado	Gregory King, Darren King, Yann Delpuech	
2000	Gemini Awards	Best Sound Editing	Nominated	La Femme Nikita	Craig Henighan, Rose Gregoris, Steve Baine, Jill Purdy	
1999	Gemini Awards	Best Sound Editing	Won	Total Recall 2070	Stephen Barden, Joe Bracciale, Angie Pajek, Craig Henighan	
1997	Genie Awards	Best Sound Editing	Nominated	Cube	Sue Conley, Stephen Barden, John Laing, Jill Purdy, John Sievert, Craig Henighan	
1996	Genie Awards	Best Sound Editing	Nominated	House	Yann Delpeuch, Fred Brennan, Paula Fairfield, Virginia Store	
1996	Gemini Awards	Best Sound Editing	Won	Due South	Yann Delpeuch, Michael Werth, Brian Avery, Allen Ormerod, Keith Elliott, Paula Fairfield	

== See also ==
- SoundStorm
- Todd-AO
- Soundelux
