= John Leveque =

Sound editor (born 1944)

- Born: March 12, 1944
- Occupation: Sound editor
- Years active: 1972-2010
- Spouse: Judy Leveque
- Children: Casey Leveque

John Leveque (born March 12, 1944) is a sound editor. He has won two BAFTAs for sound and has been nominated by the Motion Picture Sound Editors for sound.

He has worked on over 70 films.

== Oscar history ==
All four nominations are for Best Sound Editing.

- 65th Academy Awards - nominated for Under Siege. Nomination shared with Bruce Stambler. Lost to Bram Stoker's Dracula.
- 66th Academy Awards - nominated for The Fugitive. Nomination shared with Bruce Stambler. Lost to Jurassic Park.
- 67th Academy Awards - nominated for Clear and Present Danger. Nomination shared with Bruce Stambler. Lost to Speed.
- 68th Academy Awards - nominated for Batman Forever. Nomination shared with Bruce Stambler. Lost to Braveheart.
