= Gregory King (sound designer) =

Canadian sound designer

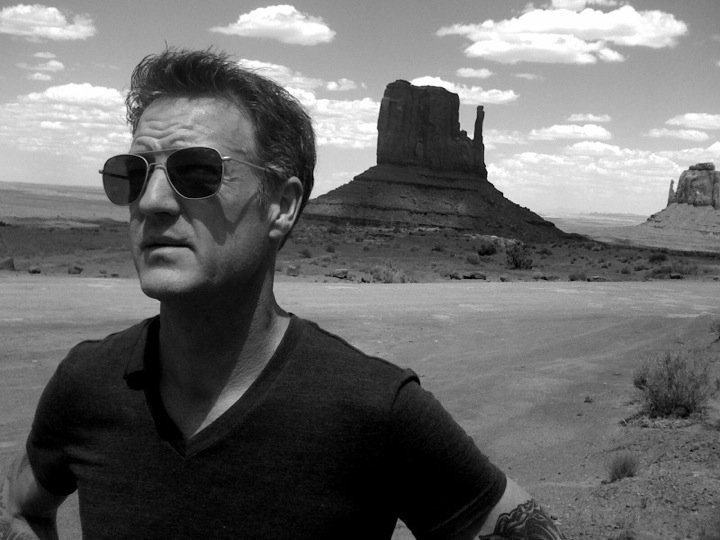
- Born: 1966 (age 59–60); Montreal, Quebec, Canada
- Occupation: Sound Designer

Gregory King (born 1966) is a Canadian sound designer. He is best known for his involvement in the sound design of The Road to El Dorado (2000) and The Insider (2001), among others.

== Career ==
Gregory King was born in 1966 in Montreal, Quebec. King's first professional job in sound design came in 1986, when he was hired by film sound editors Nolan Roberts and Alban Streeter. The beginning of his career was largely focused on sound design within the television industry and work as playing a musician in Toronto. During the late 1980s, he worked in sound design at Filmhouse, a studio now known as Deluxe Lab, and in 1991 formed the feature film sound editorial firm Sound Dogs with partner Nelson Ferreira.

In 1994, he moved to Los Angeles, forming Sound Dogs US in 1995 with fellow sound designers Robert Grieve and Robert Nokes, and launching an online sound effects archive in May 1997 called Sounddogs.com. According to editorsguild.com, King had significant artistic freedom when working at the film. He collaborated with directors Michael Mann. and Peter Berg.

In the late 2000s, King formed a sound design firm called The Dawgs Sound Design, which later became King SoundWorks. As of 2001, he worked as a supervising sound designer.

== Awards and nominations ==
Greg King's film The Insider was nominated for an Oscar for Best Sound in 1999.

He was nominated for two Golden Reel Awards in a row for The Road to El Dorado (2000) and The Insider (2001).
