= The Road to El Dorado =

2000 animated musical comedy film

- Theatrical release poster
- Directed by: Eric "Bibo" Bergeron; Don Paul
- Written by: Ted Elliott; Terry Rossio
- Produced by: Bonne Radford; Brooke Breton
- Starring: Kevin Kline; Kenneth Branagh; Rosie Perez; Armand Assante; Edward James Olmos
- Edited by: John Carnochan; Vicki Hiatt; Dan Molina; Lynne Southerland
- Music by: Hans Zimmer; John Powell
- Production company: DreamWorks Animation
- Distributed by: DreamWorks Pictures (through DreamWorks Distribution) (Note: In July 2014, the film's distribution rights were purchased by DreamWorks Animation from Paramount Pictures (owners of the pre-2005 DreamWorks Pictures catalog) and transferred to 20th Century Fox before reverting to Universal Pictures in 2018 following NBCUniversal's acquisition of DreamWorks Animation in 2016.)
- Release date: March 31, 2000
- Running time: 89 minutes
- Country: United States
- Language: English
- Budget: $95 million
- Box office: $76.4 million

The Road to El Dorado is a 2000 American animated musical comedy film directed by Eric "Bibo" Bergeron and Don Paul, from a screenplay by Ted Elliott and Terry Rossio, as well as additional sequences directed by Will Finn and David Silverman. Starring the voices of Kevin Kline, Kenneth Branagh, Rosie Perez, Armand Assante, and Edward James Olmos, the film follows a pair of Spanish con artists who, after winning the map to El Dorado, wash ashore in the New World; the map leads the two men to the city of El Dorado, where its inhabitants mistake them for gods.

The soundtrack features an instrumental score composed by Hans Zimmer and John Powell, and songs written by Elton John and Tim Rice. John also periodically narrates the story in song throughout the film. Produced by DreamWorks Animation and released by DreamWorks Pictures, it was the third animated feature produced by the studio.

The Road to El Dorado was theatrically released in the United States on March 31, 2000. It received mixed reviews from critics and was a box-office bomb, grossing $76 million worldwide on a production budget of approximately $95 million. Zimmer's work on the score, however, received praise and earned him the Critics' Choice Movie Award for Best Score alongside his work on Gladiator, another DreamWorks film, at the 6th Critics' Choice Awards. Despite its initial reception, reevaluation in later years has resulted in The Road to El Dorado becoming a cult classic.

== Plot ==
In 1519 Spain, con-artists Tulio and Miguel win gold and a map to the legendary City of Gold, El Dorado, in a rigged dice gamble against some sailors, though they win the map fairly with normal dice. After their con is exposed, the two evade the guards and accidentally stow away on a ship to be led by conquistador Hernán Cortés for the New World. At sea, they are caught, imprisoned, and are condemned to slavery in Cuba, but they break free and steal a rowboat with the help of Cortés' mistreated horse named Altivo.

Their boat reaches land (somewhere in South America), where Miguel recognizes landmarks from the map, leading them to a totem marker near a waterfall that Tulio believes is a dead end. As they prepare to leave, they encounter a beautiful native woman, Chel, being chased by guards. When the guards see Tulio and Miguel riding Altivo as depicted on the totem, they escort them and Chel to the city of El Dorado.

There, they meet the kindhearted Chief Tannabok, and his wicked advisor, high priest Tzekel-Kan. Mistaken for the twin gods, Miguel and Tulio are given luxurious quarters and placed in charge over Chel. However, she discovers their deception but promises to remain quiet if she leaves the city with them. Tannabok honors them with gifts of gold, though Miguel and Tulio disapprove of Tzekel-Kan's ritual sacrifice to honor the gods. Meanwhile, Cortés and his men reach land.

Tulio and Miguel instruct Tannabok to build them a boat so that they can leave the city with the gifts, under the ruse that they are needed back in the "other world". Chel falls in love with Tulio while Miguel comes to appreciate the peaceful life of the city. When Tzekel-Kan sees Miguel playing a ball game with children, he insists the "gods" demonstrate their powers against their best players. Tulio and Miguel are outmatched, but Chel replaces the ball with an armadillo, allowing them to win. Miguel spares the ritual of sacrificing the losing team, berates Tzekel-Kan to the crowd's approval, and earns Tannabok's respect. Tzekel-Kan notices Miguel is bleeding from a wound and realizes the pair are not gods since "gods do not bleed", hence the reason for the sacrifices.

Afterwards, Miguel, who has reconsidered leaving the city, overhears Tulio telling Chel that he would like her to come with them to Spain before adding he would like her to come with specifically him and to forget Miguel. At a party being thrown for them, Miguel and Tulio have an argument until Tzekel-Kan animates a giant stone jaguar to chase them. Tulio and Miguel outwit the jaguar, causing it and Tzekel-Kan to fall into a giant whirlpool, thought by the natives to be the entrance to Xibalba, the spirit world. Tzekel-Kan then surfaces in the jungle, where he encounters Cortés and his men. Believing Cortés to be the real god, Tzekel-Kan offers to become his right-hand man and leads him to El Dorado in exchange for helping him find the gold.

Miguel decides to stay in the city while Tulio and Chel board the completed boat, before they realize Cortés is approaching. Suspecting the city will be destroyed if Cortés discovers it, they close off the main entrance to the city by ramming the rock pillars under the waterfall, despite knowing they will lose the gold in the process. Selflessly sacrificing the chance to stay in the city, Miguel and Altivo jump onto the boat to unfurl the sails, assuring the boat clears the statue in time. The group successfully crashes against the pillars, causing a cave-in, while losing all their gifts in the process. They hide near the totem just as Cortés' men and Tzekel-Kan arrive.

When they find the entrance blocked, Cortés brands Tzekel-Kan a liar and takes him as a slave. Tulio and Miguel know that El Dorado is forever safe, though Tulio becomes upset they lost their gold (unaware that Altivo still has gold horseshoes). They nevertheless appreciate the thrill of their adventure and head for a new adventure with Chel.

== Voice cast ==
- Kevin Kline as Tulio, a con artist and Miguel's friend. He is the strategic planner, often becoming anxious and overthinking things.
- Kenneth Branagh as Miguel, a con artist and Tulio's friend. Miguel is more relaxed and laid-back in contrast to Tulio's more frantic nature. Miguel becomes accustomed to the peaceful life in El Dorado and values the city's people as opposed to the gold.
- Rosie Perez as Chel, a beautiful woman from El Dorado who discovers Tulio and Miguel's con and decides to play along in hopes of escaping El Dorado with them for a life of adventure. She is also Tulio's love interest.
- Jim Cummings as Hernán Cortés, the merciless and ambitious conquistador leader of the expedition to find gold from the empires of the New World. He serves as the film's overarching antagonist.
  - Cummings also voices the cook on Cortés's ship, a warrior who gets stepped on by Tzekel-Kan's stone jaguar, and the native who warns Chief Tannabok about Cortés.
- Edward James Olmos as Chief Tannabok, the chief of El Dorado who was very skeptical of Tulio and Miguel being gods, but treats them with kindness and hospitality because of the good they show to his people.
- Armand Assante as Tzekel-Kan, the fanatically vicious high priest and Tannabok's advisor who has a religious fixation for human sacrifices. He initially believes Tulio and Miguel are gods until he discovers the truth and becomes Cortés's henchman. He serves as the film's main antagonist.
- Frank Welker as Altivo, Cortés' horse who befriends Tulio and Miguel.
  - Welker also voices the Bull that chases Miguel and Tulio at the beginning of the movie.
- Tobin Bell as Zaragoza, a sailor on the voyage to the New World of El Dorado and the original owner of the map, which he loses to Tulio and Miguel after a game of dice.
- Elton John as The Singing Narrator
- Anne Lockhart as Girl in Barcelona (uncredited)
- Jerry Orbach as Mo (uncredited)
- Bob Bergen as Jaguar (uncredited)
- Duncan Marjoribanks as Acolyte

== Production ==
=== Development ===
Shortly before the public announcement of DreamWorks SKG in October 1994, former Disney chairman Jeffrey Katzenberg met with screenwriters Ted Elliott and Terry Rossio, whom he previously met during production of Aladdin (1992). He gave them a copy of Hugh Thomas's 1993 book Conquest: Montezuma, Cortés and the Fall of Old Mexico, desiring to make an animated film set in the Age of Discovery. By the spring of 1995, Elliott and Rossio devised a story treatment inspired by the Road to... films, which starred Bob Hope and Bing Crosby, with self-interested, comedic anti-heroes who would set out to find the Lost City of Gold after acquiring a map to its location.

Will Finn and David Silverman were originally the film's directors with a tentative release scheduled for fall 1999. Originally, the story was envisioned as a dramatic film due to Katzenberg's penchant for large-scale animated films, which conflicted with the film's lighthearted elements. This version of the story had Miguel initially conceived as a raunchy Sancho Panza-like character who died, but came back to life so much that the natives assumed he was a god. This version also included steamier love sequences and scanty clothing designed for Chel. Elliott compared their script to the 1999 war comedy Three Kings, in which the ending dealt with the destruction of the Aztec Empire from Spanish conquistador Hernán Cortés.

However, while The Prince of Egypt was in production, Katzenberg decided that their next animated project should be a departure from its serious, adult approach. Instead, he pushed for El Dorado to be an adventure comedy. Because of this, the film was placed on hold, where it was jokingly referred to as El Dorado: The Lost City on Hold due to several rewrites. Miguel and Tulio were rewritten as petty swindlers, and the setting of the film was changed to a more luscious paradise. Additionally, the romance was toned down, and new clothing was designed for Chel. The film's producer Bonne Radford explained, "We originally thought it would be rated PG-13 and so we skewed it to that group... But then we thought we could not exclude the younger kids so we had to tone the romance down." Finn and Silverman left the project in 1998 following disagreements over the film's creative direction. They were replaced by Eric "Bibo" Bergeron and Don Paul. Katzenberg reportedly co-directed the film, albeit uncredited.

=== Casting ===
On August 15, 1998, Kevin Kline, Kenneth Branagh, and Rosie Perez had signed onto the film. Because the characters and film drew from the Bob Hope and Bing Crosby Road to ... films, producer Bonne Radford remarked that "[t]he buddy relationship [between the duo] is the very heart of the story. They need each other because they're both pretty inept. They're opposites — Tulio is the schemer and Miguel is the dreamer. Their camaraderie adds to the adventure; you almost don't need to know where they're going or what they're after, because the fun is in the journey." Unusual for an animated film, Kline and Branagh recorded their lines in the same studio room together, in order for the two to achieve more realistic chemistry. This resulted in a good deal of improvised dialogue, some of which ended up in the film.

=== Animation ===
Early into production, a team of designers, animators, producers, and Katzenberg embarked on research trips to Mexico where they studied ancient Mayan cities of Tulum, Chichen Itza, and Uxmal in hopes of making the film's architecture look authentic. By January 1997, 100 animators were assigned to the project. However, because the animation department was occupied with The Prince of Egypt, the studio devoted more animators and resources on that film than on Road to El Dorado. Additional fine line animation was outsourced to Stardust Pictures in London and Bardel Entertainment in Vancouver. The creation sequence in the film, possibly the opening number by Elton John, was provided with traditional animation and CGI provided by Pacific Data Images.

== Release ==
=== Marketing ===
The Road to El Dorado was first revealed in a double trailer with Aardman Animations' animated feature Chicken Run on the home video release of The Prince of Egypt. It was accompanied by a promotional campaign by Burger King.

=== Home media ===
The Road to El Dorado was released on DVD and VHS on December 12, 2000. There was also an event held in El Dorado, Kansas in which a parade was held and the streets were painted gold in celebration of the film's home video release. The DVD release includes an audio commentary, behind-the-scenes featurettes, music video of "Someday Out of the Blue", production notes, interactive games, trailers and television spots.

In February 2006, Paramount Pictures acquired the rights to all live-action films DreamWorks had released between 1997 and 2005, following Viacom's $1.6 billion acquisition of the company's live-action film assets and television assets. Additionally, Paramount signed a six-year distribution agreement for past and future DreamWorks Animation films, with DreamWorks Animation having spun off into a separate company from the live-action division in 2004.

On December 31, 2012, DreamWorks Animation's distribution agreement with Paramount officially ended. In July 2014, the distribution rights to the DreamWorks Animation catalog were purchased back by DreamWorks Animation from Paramount and transferred to new distribution partner 20th Century Fox. Fox's distribution rights reverted to Universal Pictures in 2018, two years after Comcast/NBCUniversal's $3.8 billion acquisition of DreamWorks Animation in 2016. Because of this new ownership, Universal Pictures Home Entertainment subsequently released the film on Blu-ray on January 22, 2019.

== Reception ==
=== Box office ===
The film grossed $12.9 million on opening weekend, ranking second behind Erin Brockovich's third weekend. The film closed on June 29, 2000, after earning $50.9 million in the United States and Canada and $25.5 million overseas for a worldwide total of $76.4 million. Based on its total gross, The Road to El Dorado was a commercial failure, unable to recoup its $95 million budget.

=== Critical response ===
==== Initial ====
On Rotten Tomatoes, the film has an approval rating of 50% based on 107 reviews and an average rating of 5.50/10. The site's critical consensus reads, "Predictable story and thin characters made the movie flat." On Metacritic, the film has a score of 51 out of 100 based on 29 critics, indicating "mixed or average reviews". Audiences polled by CinemaScore gave the film an average grade of "B+" on an A+ to F scale.

Reviewing for the Chicago Tribune, Michael Wilmington summarized: "This movie is fun to watch in ways that most recent cartoons aren't. It's also more adult, though it's the same cartoonish sensuality as the original Road movies, with their heavily coded prurience. It's a high-spirited movie, though it's not for all tastes. The John-Rice score isn't as rousingly on-target as The Lion King. The script, while clever, often seems too cute and show-biz snazzy, not emotional enough."

Lisa Schwarzbaum, reviewing for Entertainment Weekly, remarked that "this trip down The Road to El Dorado proceeds under the speed limit all the way. Our Tulio and Miguel aren't big enough, nor strong enough, nor funny enough to buckle any swashes. They're as lost to us as the lost city into which they stumble." Similarly, animation historian Charles Solomon remarked on the lack of character development, writing, "Tulio and Miguel move nicely, but the animators don't seem to have any more idea who they are than the audience does. Kevin Kline and Kenneth Branagh supply their voices, but the characters say and do similar things in similar ways. Who can tell them apart?" Paul Clinton of CNN wrote, "The animation is uninspiring and brings nothing new to the table of animation magic." He unfavorably compared the Elton John–Tim Rice songs to those in The Lion King and called the plot "uninspired".

Among the film's more positive reviewers was Roger Ebert of the Chicago Sun-Times, who gave the film three stars out of four. He acknowledged that although The Road to El Dorado is not "as quirky as Antz or as grown up as The Prince of Egypt", it is "bright and has good energy, and the kinds of witty asides that entertain the adults in between the margins of the stuff for the kids." Joel Siegel, reviewing on the television program Good Morning America, called it "solid gold," claiming the film was "paved with laughs." Jay Boyar of the Orlando Sentinel stated "The Road to El Dorado is borderline entertaining, I suppose, with animation that is, at times, truly impressive. And if the six Elton John/Tim Rice songs are thoroughly forgettable, they lack sufficient distinction to actually become annoying."

Indigenous rights organizations criticized the film for its sexist and racist themes, and for its lack of historical sensitivity. Olin Tezcatlipoca, director of the Mexica Movement, argued that the movie portrays Chel as a "sex toy" for Miguel and Tulio, and that the representation of them as saviors from the barbarity of human sacrifices and from indigenous collaborationism with Hernán Cortés "has no respect for history."

==== Later reception ====
Petrana Radulovic, writing for Polygon in 2020, praised the characters of Miguel and Tulio, as well as the "hilarious scenes and quippy dialogue". She concluded, "While the adventure and the plot's historical aspects aren't perfect, the characters' dynamic has transcended the pacing issues and other irritations. El Dorado's reputation has been reclaimed by generations of people who've recontextualized the movie outside of the Disney shadow it was stuck under in 2000." Caroline Cao of /Film wrote "the songs by Elton John feel phoned in, and the treatment of indigenous people is troublesome, particularly the film's reliance on white savior tropes and its sexualization of an indigenous woman. Still, many feel that its good parts outweigh its faults."

Twenty years after the film's release, The Road to El Dorado had an unexpected rise in popularity as an Internet meme. Radulovic noted a range of memes and GIFs of moments from the film, writing that it "found a second life and a long-lasting legacy, since it came out at the perfect time to make it a nostalgic movie for people who grew up with the internet."

=== Accolades ===
Award	Category	Nominee(s)	Result	Ref.
Annie Awards	Outstanding Achievement in an Animated Theatrical Feature		Nominated	
Annie Awards	Outstanding Individual Achievement for Character Animation	David Brewster	Nominated	
Annie Awards	Outstanding Individual Achievement for Character Animation	Rodolphe Guendonen	Nominated	
Annie Awards	Outstanding Individual Achievement for Effects Animation	Doug Ikeler	Nominated	
Annie Awards	Outstanding Individual Achievement for Music in an Animated Feature Production	Hans Zimmer & John Powell / Elton John & Tim Rice	Nominated	
Annie Awards	Outstanding Individual Achievement for Production Design in an Animated Feature Production	Christian Schellewald	Nominated	
Annie Awards	Outstanding Individual Achievement for Storyboarding in an Animated Feature Production	Jeff Snow	Nominated	
Annie Awards	Outstanding Individual Achievement for Voice Acting by a Male Performer in an Animated Feature Production	Armand Assante (as "Tzekel-Kan")	Nominated	
Critics' Choice Awards	Best Composer	Hans Zimmer (Also for Gladiator and Mission: Impossible 2)	Won	
Golden Reel Awards	Best Sound Editing – Animated Feature	Gregory King, Yann Delpuech, and Darren King	Nominated	
Golden Reel Awards	Best Sound Editing – Music – Animated Feature	Adam Milo Smalley and Vicki Hiatt	Nominated	
Kids' Choice Awards	Favorite Voice from an Animated Movie	Kevin Kline	Nominated	
Saturn Awards	Best Music	Hans Zimmer and John Powell	Nominated	

== Video game ==
Gold and Glory: The Road to El Dorado is an adventure video game developed by Revolution Software for Microsoft Windows and PlayStation. The Game Boy Color version was developed by Planet Interactive.

== See also ==
- El Dorado, the legendary city of gold
