= Batman Forever =

1995 superhero film by Joel Schumacher

- Theatrical release poster by John Alvin
- Directed by: Joel Schumacher
- Screenplay by: Lee Batchler; Janet Scott Batchler; Akiva Goldsman
- Story by: Lee Batchler; Janet Scott Batchler
- Based on: Characters by DC Comics; Batman by; Bob Kane; Bill Finger (Note: Bill Finger was not credited for his role in the creation of Batman until 2015.)
- Produced by: Tim Burton; Peter MacGregor-Scott
- Starring: Val Kilmer; Tommy Lee Jones; Jim Carrey; Nicole Kidman; Chris O'Donnell
- Cinematography: Stephen Goldblatt
- Edited by: Dennis Virkler
- Music by: Elliot Goldenthal
- Production companies: Warner Bros.; PolyGram Pictures; Tim Burton Productions
- Distributed by: Warner Bros.
- Release dates: June 9, 1995 (Mann Village Theater); June 16, 1995 (United States)
- Running time: 121 minutes
- Country: United States
- Language: English
- Budget: $100 million
- Box office: $336.6 million

Batman Forever is a 1995 American superhero film based on the DC Comics character Batman. It is the sequel to Batman Returns and the third installment in the Batman film series (1989–1997). Directed by Joel Schumacher and produced by Tim Burton and Peter MacGregor-Scott, it stars Val Kilmer as Bruce Wayne / Batman, replacing Michael Keaton, alongside Tommy Lee Jones, Jim Carrey, Nicole Kidman, and Chris O'Donnell. The film follows Batman as he attempts to prevent Two-Face (Jones) and the Riddler (Carrey) from uncovering his secret identity and extracting information from the minds of Gotham City's residents, while at the same time navigating his feelings for psychologist Dr. Chase Meridian (Kidman) and adopting orphaned acrobat Dick Grayson (O'Donnell)—who becomes his partner and best friend, Robin.

Schumacher mostly eschewed the dark, dystopian atmosphere of Burton's films by drawing inspiration from the Batman comic books of the Dick Sprang era, as well as the 1960s television series. After Keaton chose not to reprise his role, William Baldwin and Ethan Hawke were considered as replacements, before Kilmer joined the cast.

Batman Forever was released by Warner Bros. on June 16, 1995, to mixed reviews from critics, who praised the visuals, action sequences, and soundtrack, but criticized the screenplay and tonal departure from the previous two films. The film was a box office success, grossing over $336 million worldwide and becoming the sixth-highest-grossing film of 1995. It was followed by Batman & Robin in 1997, with Schumacher returning as the director, O'Donnell returning as Robin, and George Clooney replacing Kilmer as Batman.

== Plot ==
In Gotham City, Batman defuses a hostage situation orchestrated by the criminal Two-Face, formerly district attorney Harvey Dent, who escapes. Flashbacks reveal that Dent, once one of Batman's biggest supporters, was horribly disfigured with acid on one side of his face by mobster Sal Maroni. The trauma of the incident caused Dent to develop a split personality, make decisions based on the flip of a coin, and swear vengeance against Batman for failing to prevent the incident.

Edward Nygma, an eccentric and egotistical researcher at Wayne Enterprises, approaches his employer, Bruce Wayne, to present an invention that can beam television signals directly into the brain, demanding immediate approval directly from Bruce. Bruce rejects the device as he is concerned that the technology could manipulate minds. After killing his abusive supervisor and staging it as a suicide, Nygma resigns and plots revenge against Bruce, sending him riddles. Criminal psychologist Chase Meridian diagnoses Nygma as psychotic.

Bruce attends a circus with Chase. Two-Face hijacks the event and threatens to detonate a bomb unless Batman reveals his identity. Dick Grayson, the youngest member of the Flying Graysons family of acrobats, prevents the bomb from killing anyone by throwing it into a river with the help of his family; however, Two-Face kills all of them except Dick in the process. Bruce invites the now-orphaned Dick to live at Wayne Manor as his ward, where he later discovers that Bruce is Batman. Seeking to avenge the death of his family, Dick demands to join Batman in crime-fighting, hoping to kill Two-Face, but Bruce declines in order to help Dick move on instead, as he is considering retirement.

Nygma becomes the Riddler and teams up with Two-Face. They commit a series of robberies to finance Nygma's new company and mass-produce his brainwave device dubbed the Box, which steals information from minds and transfers it to Nygma's, increasing his intelligence but also slowly causing him to lose his grip on reality. At a party hosted by Nygma, Batman pursues Two-Face and is almost killed until Dick saves him.

Batman visits Chase, who explains that she has fallen in love with Bruce, and Bruce reveals his secret identity to her. Having discovered Bruce's secret through the Box, on Halloween night, Two-Face and the Riddler destroy the Batcave, shoot Bruce, and abduct Chase. As Bruce recovers, he and his butler, Alfred Pennyworth, deduce that Nygma is the Riddler through clues he left in his riddles, while Chase is held prisoner in the Riddler's lair. Bruce finally accepts Dick as his comrade, Robin.

At the Riddler's lair, Robin defeats Two-Face but chooses to spare him, which allows Two-Face to capture Robin at gunpoint. The Riddler reveals his final riddle: Chase and Robin, representing the two sides of Batman's personality, are trapped in tubes above a deadly drop, and he only has the time to save one. Batman distracts the Riddler with a riddle himself, before destroying the Riddler's brainwave receiver with a Batarang, damaging the Riddler's mind and enabling Batman to rescue both when he sees the floor is an optical illusion. Two-Face corners them and flips his coin to decide their fate, but loses his balance after Batman throws multiple identical coins in the air, and falls to his death.

Committed to Arkham Asylum, a now-delusional Nygma exclaims that he is Batman. Bruce, the real Batman, resumes his crusade with Robin as his partner.

== Cast ==
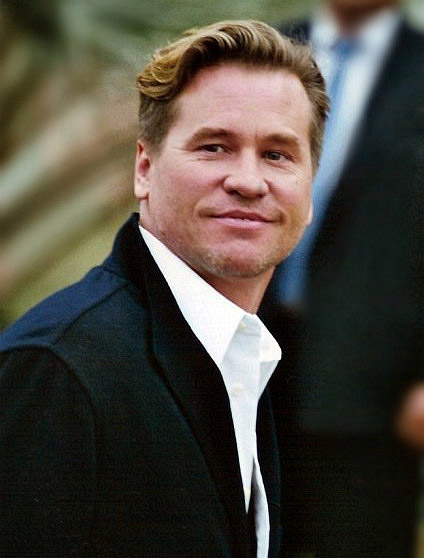
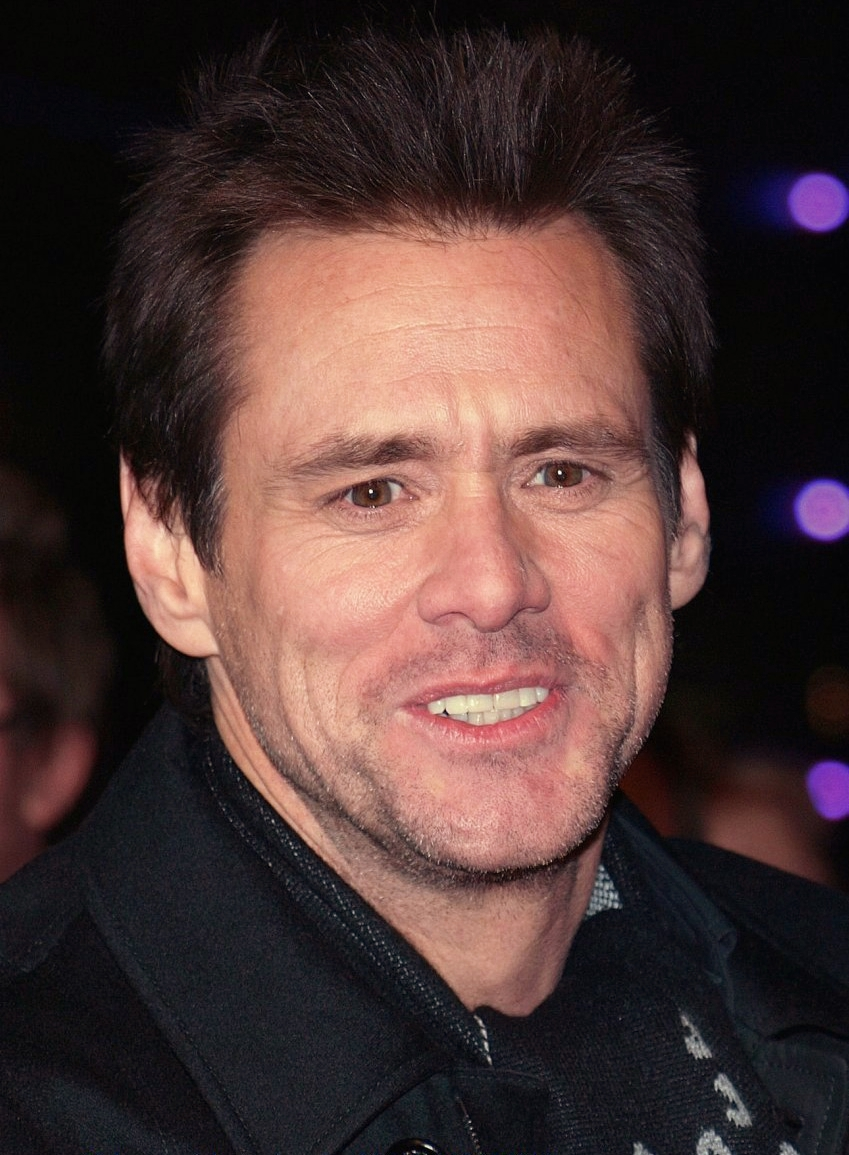
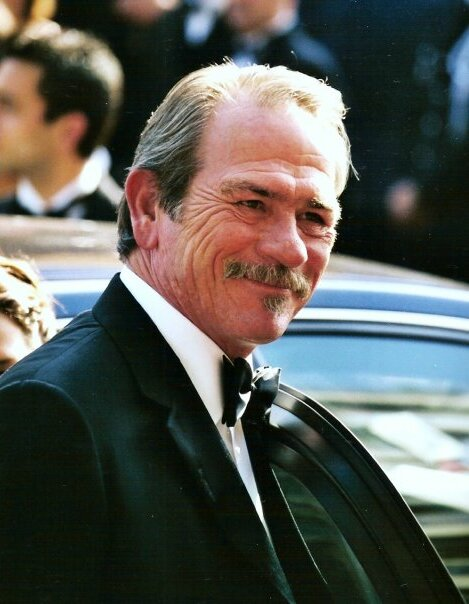
Val Kilmer, Jim Carrey (in 2008), and Tommy Lee Jones (both 2005)
- Val Kilmer as Bruce Wayne / Batman.
- Tommy Lee Jones as Harvey Dent / Two-Face, former Gotham City district attorney and now a gangster.
- Jim Carrey as Edward Nygma / The Riddler, a Wayne Enterprises employee and later a criminal mastermind.
- Nicole Kidman as Dr. Chase Meridian, a psychologist.
- Chris O'Donnell as Richard "Dick" Grayson / Robin, a circus acrobat.
- Michael Gough as Alfred Pennyworth, Bruce Wayne's butler and confidente.
- Pat Hingle as James Gordon, the Gotham City police commissioner.
- Drew Barrymore as Sugar, Two-Face's "good" assistant.
- Debi Mazar as Spice, Two-Face's "bad" assistant.
- Elizabeth Sanders as Gossip Gerty, Gotham's top gossip columnist.
- René Auberjonois as Dr. Burton, Head Doctor of Arkham Asylum.
- Joe Grifasi as Hawkins, a bank guard.
- Michael Paul Chan as executive.
- Jon Favreau as assistant.
- Glory Fioramonti as Dick Grayson's mother.
- Larry A. Lee as Dick Grayson's father.
- Mitch Gaylord as Dick Grayson's older brother.
- George Wallace as the mayor of Gotham City.
- En Vogue as girls on corner.
- Ofer Samra as Harvey's thug.
- Ed Begley Jr. (uncredited) as Fred Stickley, Edward Nygma's supervisor at Wayne Enterprises.

Additionally, United States Senator and Batman fan Patrick Leahy makes an uncredited appearance as himself.

== Production ==
=== Development ===
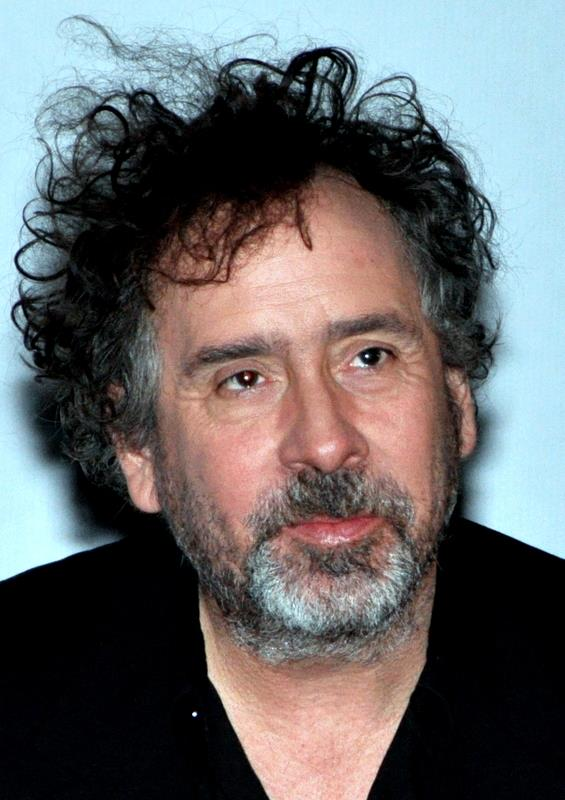
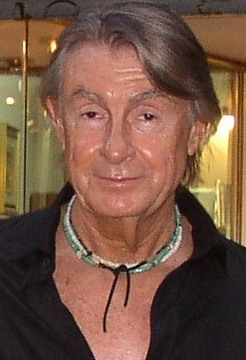
The franchise's original director, Tim Burton (left, pictured in 2012), was replaced by Joel Schumacher (right, pictured in 2003).

"I realized halfway through my meeting with Warner Bros. that they didn't really want me to do the movie. They kept saying, 'Don't you wanna go back and do a movie like Edward Scissorhands? Something smaller?' I said, 'You don't want me to do the movie, do you?

— Tim Burton.

Batman Returns was released in 1992 with financial success and generally favorable reviews from critics, but Warner Bros. was disappointed with its box office run, having made $150 million less than the first film. After Batman Returns was deemed too dark and inappropriate for children, with McDonald's even recalling their Happy Meal tie-in, Warner Bros. decided that this was the primary cause of the film's financial results. After the film's release, Warner Bros. was not interested in Tim Burton's return as director. Burton noted he was unsure about returning to direct, writing: "I don't think Warner Bros. wanted me to direct a third Batman. I even said that to them." Burton and Warner Bros. mutually agreed to part ways, though Burton would stay on as producer. Sam Raimi was briefly considered to direct, but Warner eventually deemed him to be too inexperienced at the time. John McTiernan turned down an offer to direct since he was too busy making Die Hard with a Vengeance (1995). In June 1993, Joel Schumacher was selected by Warner Bros. while he was filming The Client (1994), and with Burton's approval.

"Tim Burton is a friend of mine, so I had to go and ask him first. If he didn't want me to make the film, I wasn't going to make it, because this was his franchise. I had lunch with Tim and he said, 'Please do it, do it!'"

— Joel Schumacher about Tim Burton

Lee and Janet Scott-Batchler, a husband-and-wife screenwriting team, were hired to write the script. Warner Bros. had lost a bidding war for their spec script titled Smoke and Mirrors to Disney's Hollywood Pictures. The project ultimately fell through, and Warner Bros. offered the Batchlers several of their film properties to write. Being familiar with the Batman comics from their childhood, the Batchlers chose to work on the next Batman film as their next project. In a meeting with Burton, they agreed that "the key element to Batman is his duality. And it's not just that Batman is Bruce Wayne".

"I always hated those titles like Batman Forever. That sounds like a tattoo that somebody would get when they're on drugs or something. Or something some kid would write in the yearbook."

— Tim Burton

Their original script introduced a psychotic Riddler, real name Lyle Heckendorf, with a pet rat accompanying him. A scene cut from the final film included Heckendorf obtaining his costume from a fortune-telling leprechaun at the circus. Instead of NygmaTech, the company would have been named HeckTech. The story elements and much of the dialogue remained in the finished film, though Schumacher felt it could be "lighte[ne]d down". Michael Keaton initially approved the selection of Schumacher as director and planned on reprising his role as Batman from the first two films. Schumacher claims he originally had in mind an adaptation of Frank Miller's Batman: Year One and Keaton claimed that he was enthusiastic about the idea. Warner Bros. rejected the idea as they wanted a sequel, not a prequel, though Schumacher was able to include very brief events in Bruce Wayne's childhood with some events of the comic The Dark Knight Returns. Akiva Goldsman, who worked with Schumacher on The Client, was brought in to rewrite the script. Burton, who was now more interested in directing Ed Wood (1994), later reflected he was taken aback by some of the focus group meetings for Batman Forever, a title he hated. Producer Peter MacGregor-Scott represented the studio's aim in making a film for the MTV Generation, with full merchandising appeal.

=== Casting ===
Production went on a fast track with Rene Russo cast as Chase Meridian, but Keaton decided not to reprise Batman because he did not like the direction the series was headed in, and rejected the script. Keaton's departure was announced in July 1994. Keaton also wanted to pursue "more interesting roles", turning down $15 million. A decision was made to go with a younger actor for Bruce Wayne, and an offer was made to Ethan Hawke, who turned it down, but eventually regretted the decision. Hawke however would ultimately voice the character in the Batwheels animated series. Schumacher had seen Val Kilmer in Tombstone (1993), but was also interested in William Baldwin (who like Hawke would later voice the character in Justice League: Crisis on Two Earths in 2010), Alec Baldwin, Ralph Fiennes (who would later voice Alfred Pennyworth in The Lego Batman Movie in 2017), and Daniel Day-Lewis. While Burton pushed for Johnny Depp to get the role, Kurt Russell was also considered. Tom Hanks turned down the offer in favor of Apollo 13. Keanu Reeves and Dean Cain was in the mix, but Cain was dismissed because he was already known for playing Superman in TV Series Lois & Clark: The New Adventures of Superman. Kilmer, who as a child visited the studios where the 1960s series was recorded, and shortly before had visited a bat cave in Africa, was contacted by his agent for the role. Kilmer signed on by July 1994 without reading the script or knowing who the director was.

With Kilmer's casting, Warner Bros. dropped Russo, considering her too old to be paired with Kilmer. Jeanne Tripplehorn, Robin Wright, Sandra Bullock, Cindy Crawford and Linda Hamilton were considered for the role, which was eventually recast with Nicole Kidman. Kidman later revealed she took the role because she "wanted to kiss Batman." Billy Dee Williams took the role of Harvey Dent in the 1989 film on the possibility of portraying Two-Face in a sequel, but Schumacher instead cast Tommy Lee Jones in the role. Al Pacino, Clint Eastwood, Martin Sheen and Robert De Niro were also considered. Mel Gibson turned down the role in favor of Braveheart (1995). Jones was reluctant to accept the role, but did so at his son's insistence.

Robin Williams was in discussions to be the Riddler at one point, and was reportedly in competition for the role with John Malkovich. In June 1994, the role was given to Jim Carrey after Williams had reportedly turned it down, reportedly angry about the "bait-and-switch," to try and manipulate Jack Nicholson into taking the role of Joker in 1989 Batman. Williams publicly demanded an apology from the studio. According to Goldsman, Williams backed out after he and Schumacher couldn't see eye to eye. In a 2003 interview, Schumacher stated Michael Jackson had lobbied hard for the role, but was turned down before Carrey was cast. Brad Dourif (who was Burton's original choice to portray the Joker and Scarecrow after), Kelsey Grammer, Micky Dolenz, Matthew Broderick, Phil Hartman and Steve Martin were said to have been considered. Schumacher initially thought Carrey was "too young" for the role, but he changed his mind when he saw the trailer for Carrey's The Mask.

Robin had appeared in the shooting script for Batman Returns but was deleted due to the production having too many characters. Marlon Wayans had been cast in the role and signed on for a potential sequel, but when Schumacher took over, he decided to open up casting to other actors. Leonardo DiCaprio was considered, but decided not to pursue the role after a meeting with Schumacher. Among others, Matt Damon, Corey Haim, Corey Feldman, Mark Wahlberg, Michael Worth, Toby Stephens, Ewan McGregor, Jude Law, Alan Cumming and Scott Speedman were considered. (Note: Attributed to multiple references.) Chris O'Donnell was cast and Mitch Gaylord served as his stunt double. Gaylord also portrayed Mitch Grayson, Dick's older brother, who was created for the film. Schumacher attempted to create a cameo role for Bono as his MacPhisto character, but both came to agree it was not suitable for the film.

=== Filming ===
Principal photography began on September 24, 1994, and wrapped on March 5, 1995. Schumacher hired Barbara Ling for production design, claiming that the film needed a "force" and good design. Ling could "advance on it". Schumacher wanted a design in no way connected to the previous films, and instead inspired by the images from the Batman comic books seen in the 1940s and early 1950s, and New York City architecture in the 1930s, with a combination of modern Tokyo. He also wanted a "city with personality," with more statues, as well as various amounts of neon.

=== Difficulties and clashes ===
Schumacher and Kilmer clashed during the making of the film; Schumacher described Kilmer as "childish and impossible," reporting that he fought with various crewmen and refused to speak to Schumacher for two weeks after the director told him to stop being rude. Schumacher also mentioned Tommy Lee Jones as a source of trouble: "Jim Carrey was a gentleman, and Tommy Lee was threatened by him. I'm tired of defending overpaid, overprivileged actors. I pray I don't work with them again." In a 2014 interview, Carrey acknowledged that Jones was not friendly to him, and recounted an incident wherein Jones told him: "I hate you. I really don't like you ... I cannot sanction your buffoonery."

=== Design and visual effects ===
Rick Baker designed the prosthetic makeup. John Dykstra, Andrew Adamson, Jim Rygiel and Ariel Velasco-Shaw served as visual effects supervisors, with Rhythm & Hues Studios (R&H) and Pacific Data Images also contributing to visual effects work. R&H and PDI provided a CGI Batman for complicated stunts. For the costume design, producer Peter MacGregor-Scott claimed that 146 workers were at one point working together. Batman's costume was redesigned along the lines of a more "MTV organic, and edgier feel" to the suit. Jose Fernandez sculpted the nipples on the Batsuits inspired by Roman armor. Schumacher wanted the nipples be pointier but Fernandez didn't want to, but he did it as Schumacher was "the boss". Sound design and mixing was created and supervised by Bruce Stambler and John Levesque, which included trips to caves to record bat sounds. A new Batmobile was designed for Batman Forever, with two cars being constructed, one for stunt purposes and one for close-ups. Chris O'Donnell had the area around his eyes painted black and then the Robin mask glued on him. Swiss surrealist painter H. R. Giger provided his version for the Batmobile, but it was considered too sinister for the film.

The film used some motion capture for certain visual effects. Warner Bros. had acquired motion capture technology from arcade video game company Acclaim Entertainment for use in the film's production.

== Music ==
Elliot Goldenthal was hired by Schumacher to compose the film score before the screenplay was written. In discussions with Schumacher, the director wanted Goldenthal to avoid taking inspiration from Danny Elfman and requested an original composition. The film's promotional trailers and commercials, however, used the main title theme from Elfman's score from the 1989 film.

The soundtrack was commercially successful, selling almost as many copies as Prince's soundtrack to the 1989 Batman film. Only five of the songs on the soundtrack are actually featured in the movie. Hit singles from the soundtrack include "Hold Me, Thrill Me, Kiss Me, Kill Me" by U2 and "Kiss from a Rose" by Seal, both of which were nominated for MTV Movie Awards. "Kiss from a Rose" (whose music video was also directed by Joel Schumacher) reached No. 1 on the U.S. charts as well. The soundtrack itself, featuring additional songs by The Flaming Lips, Brandy (both songs also included in the film), Method Man, Nick Cave, Michael Hutchence (of INXS), PJ Harvey and Massive Attack, was an attempt to (in producer Peter MacGregor-Scott's words) make the film more "pop".

== Release ==
=== Marketing ===
In addition to a large line of toys, video games, and action figures from Kenner, the McDonald's food chain released several collectibles and mugs to coincide with the release of the film. Peter David and Alan Grant wrote separate novelizations of the film. Dennis O'Neil authored a comic book adaptation, with art by Michal Dutkiewicz.

Six Flags Great Adventure theme park re-themed their "Axis Chemical" arena, home of the Batman stunt show, to resemble Batman Forever, and the new show featured props from the film. Six Flags Over Texas featured a one-time fireworks show to promote the movie, and replica busts of Batman, Robin, Two-Face, and the Riddler could be found in the Justice League store in the Looney Tunes U.S.A. section until they were removed in 2023. Batman: The Ride opened at Six Flags St. Louis to promote the movie. At Six Flags Over Georgia, The Mind Bender roller coaster was redesigned to look as though it were the creation of The Riddler, and some images and props were used in the design of the roller coaster and its queue.

=== Video games ===
Video games based on the film were released. A tie-in video game, was released in 1995 for Super Nintendo Entertainment System, Game Boy, Sega Genesis, Game Gear, R-Zone and MS-DOS, it was followed by Batman & Robin for the PlayStation, to promote the release of the 1997 film. Two arcade versions, Batman Forever: The Arcade Game, were released in 1996 and were ported to the three consoles, and a pinball machine based on the film was released in 1995 by Sega Pinball.

=== Home media ===
Batman Forever was released on VHS and LaserDisc on October 31, 1995. Over 3 million VHS copies were sold during the first week of release, and it became the sixth-best-selling video of 1996 in the United States. The film was then released on DVD on May 20, 1997. This release was a double-sided disc containing both widescreen (1.85:1) and full screen (1.33:1) versions of the film. Batman Forever made its Blu-ray debut on April 20, 2010. This was followed by an Ultra HD Blu-ray release on June 4, 2019.

==== Deleted scenes ====
Batman Forever went through a few major edits before its release. Originally darker than the final product, the film's original length was closer to two hours and forty minutes, according to Schumacher. There was talk of an extended cut being released to DVD for the film's tenth anniversary in 2005. While all four previous Batman films were given special-edition DVD releases on the same day as the Batman Begins DVD release, none of them were given extended cuts, although some scenes were in a deleted scenes section in the special features.

In the United Kingdom, almost two minutes of cuts were made to ensure the film a PG cinema certificate; these cuts were waived for the 2024 cinema re-release, which was instead rated 12.

== Reception ==
=== Box office ===
Batman Forever opened in a record 2,842 theaters and 4,300 screens in the United States and Canada on June 16, 1995, grossing $52.8 million in its opening weekend, taking Jurassic Park's record for having the highest opening-weekend gross of all time (it was surpassed two years later by The Lost World: Jurassic Park's $72.1 million). For six years, it had the largest opening weekend for a Warner Bros. film until 2001, when it was surpassed by Harry Potter and the Sorcerer's Stone. The film also achieved the highest June opening weekend, holding that record until it was beaten by Austin Powers: The Spy Who Shagged Me in 1999. It was the first film to gross $20 million in one day, on its opening day on Friday. The film also beat out Congo to reach the number one spot. It grossed $77.4 million in its first week, which was below the record $81.7 million set by Jurassic Park.

Additionally, the film held the record for having the highest opening weekend for a superhero film until it was taken by X-Men in 2000. That year, How the Grinch Stole Christmas broke Batman Forever's record for scoring Jim Carrey's biggest opening weekend. While the film was overtaken by Pocahontas during its second weekend, it still made $29.2 million. It then became the first film of 1995 to reach $100 million domestically. Tying with Batman, this was the fastest Warner Bros. film to cross that mark, only doing so in just ten days, a feat that was achieved five years later in 2000 by The Perfect Storm. The film started its international roll out in Japan on June 17, 1995, and grossed $2.2 million in 5 days from 167 screens, which was only 80% of the gross of its predecessor Batman Returns.

The film went on to gross $184 million in the United States and Canada, and $152.5 million in other countries, totaling $336.53 million. The film grossed more than Batman Returns, and is the second-highest-grossing film from 1995 in the United States, behind Toy Story, as well as the sixth-highest-grossing film of that year worldwide.

=== Critical response ===
On Rotten Tomatoes, Batman Forever has an approval rating of 41% based on 73 reviews, with an average rating of 5.1/10. The site's critical consensus reads: "Loud, excessively busy, and often boring, Batman Forever nonetheless has the charisma of Jim Carrey and Tommy Lee Jones to offer mild relief." On Metacritic, the film has a weighted average score of 51 out of 100, based on 23 critics, indicating "mixed or average" reviews. Audiences polled by CinemaScore gave the film an average grade of "A−" on an A+ to F scale.

Peter Travers of Rolling Stone wrote: "Batman Forever still gets in its licks. There's no fun machine this summer that packs more surprises." Travers criticized the film's excessive commercialism and felt that "the script misses the pain Tim Burton caught in a man tormented by the long-ago murder of his parents", but praised Kilmer's performance as having a "deftly understated [...] comic edge". James Berardinelli of ReelViews enjoyed the film, writing: "It's lighter, brighter, funnier, faster-paced, and a whole lot more colorful than before."

On the television program Siskel & Ebert, Gene Siskel of the Chicago Tribune and Roger Ebert of the Chicago Sun-Times both gave the film mixed reviews, but with the former giving it a thumbs up and the latter a thumbs down. In his written review, Ebert wrote: "Is the movie better entertainment? Well, it's great bubblegum for the eyes. Younger children will be able to process it more easily; some kids were led bawling from Batman Returns where the PG-13 rating was a joke."

Mick LaSalle of the San Francisco Chronicle had a mixed reaction, concluding: "a shot of Kilmer's rubber buns at one point is guaranteed to bring squeals from the audience." Brian Lowry of Variety believed: "One does have to question the logic behind adding nipples to the hard-rubber batsuit. Whose idea was that supposed to be anyway, Alfred's? Some of the computer-generated Gotham cityscapes appear too obviously fake. Elliot Goldenthal's score, while serviceable, also isn't as stirring as Danny Elfman's work in the first two films."

Some observers thought Schumacher, a gay man, added possible homoerotic innuendo in the storyline. Regarding the costume design, Schumacher stated: "I had no idea that putting nipples on the Batsuit and Robin suit were going to spark international headlines. The bodies of the suits come from Ancient Greek statues, which display perfect bodies. They are anatomically correct." O'Donnell felt: "It wasn't so much the nipples that bothered me. It was the codpiece. The press obviously played it up and made it a big deal, especially with Joel directing. I didn't think twice about the controversy, but going back and looking and seeing some of the pictures, it was very unusual."

=== Accolades ===
At the 68th Academy Awards, Batman Forever was nominated for Cinematography (lost to Braveheart), Sound (Donald O. Mitchell, Frank A. Montaño, Michael Herbick and Petur Hliddal; lost to Apollo 13) and Sound Effects Editing (John Leveque and Bruce Stambler; also lost to Braveheart).

"Hold Me, Thrill Me, Kiss Me, Kill Me" by U2 was nominated for the Golden Globe Award for Best Original Song (lost to "Colors of the Wind" from Pocahontas), but was also nominated for the Golden Raspberry Award for Worst Original Song (lost to "Walk into the Wind" from Showgirls).

At the 22nd Saturn Awards, the film was nominated for Best Fantasy Film (lost to Babe), Make-up (lost to Seven), Special Effects (lost to Jumanji) and Costume Design (lost to 12 Monkeys).

Composer Elliot Goldenthal was given a Grammy Award nomination.

Batman Forever received six nominations at the 1996 MTV Movie Awards, four of which were divided between two categories (Carrey and Lee Jones for Best Villain; and Seal's "Kiss from a Rose" and U2's "Hold Me" in Best Song from a Movie).

== Legacy ==
=== Director's cut ===
Cuts were made to the film based on audience reactions during test screenings, like the rest of the Batman films. Photographs from these scenes have always been available since the film's release, shown in magazines such as Starlog. Some excerpts from these scenes appear in the music video for "Hold Me, Thrill Me, Kiss Me, Kill Me". In 2005, Batman Forever was the only film in the franchise to include a dedicated deleted scenes selection among its bonus content on the special edition DVD.

After Schumacher died on June 22, 2020, media outlets started reporting the possible existence of an extended cut, with the first rumors being thrown in by American journalist Marc Bernardin. Bernardin claimed it to be darker and contain less camp than the theatrical cut. Some of the differences include Bruce having a vision of a human-sized bat, less of an emphasis on Dick Grayson, and a focus on Bruce's psychological issues with Chase. The cut uses about 50 minutes of additional footage. Warner Bros. confirmed that alternative test screening cuts existed after an interview with Variety, although they have no plans to release it and are unsure about what, if any, footage remains. Later that year on August 7, Kilmer's appearance at DC FanDome fueled fan speculation about the release of a so-called "Schumacher Cut". Batman Forever screenwriter Akiva Goldsman revealed in a YouTube interview in April 2021 that he had recently seen the original cut of the film (dubbed "Preview Cut: One") and that he expects a rebirth coming up, suggesting all the footage needed to make the Schumacher cut still exists and that the release of a director's cut might be possible.

In July 2023, following a private screening of a workprint version by director Kevin Smith, Goldsman confirmed that the original cut does exist. Even though Warner Bros. currently has no plans to release it, he said he was hopeful for a possible distribution in the future. Some of the aforementioned deleted scenes made up a portion of this footage.

In July 2024, Goldsman reaffirmed the existence of the director's cut, while also declaring that work to restore it has been put on hold following Warner Bros.' recent internal turmoil.

In May 2025, an independent Los Angeles theater announced that a screening of the workprint of the director's cut would take place at their venue later that month. However, on May 24, the screening was cancelled following a cease and desist letter from Warner Bros.

In July 2025, during an interview about his career, Goldsman declared that while Warner Bros isn't currently interested in releasing the director's cut, he's still lobbying for it.

In September 2025, during the celebrations for Batman Day, executive producer Michael E. Uslan confirmed the existence of the unreleased footage and urged the fans to continue to voice their support for the release of the alternate cut of the film.

=== Batman '89 ===
An alternate six-issue comic book continuation of Batman Returns titled Batman '89, which ignores the events of Batman Forever and Batman & Robin and brings back Keaton's Batman along with Burton's dark setting seen in his first two Batman films, along with elements of his failed third Batman film (particularly, the return of Billy Dee Williams' Harvey Dent and transformation into Two-Face, the introductions of new versions of Robin and Barbara Gordon, and the return of Catwoman), was launched on August 10, 2021, with its issues releasing monthly before ending in July 2022.

In response to a question as to whether Schumacher's Batman films are canon to the world of Batman '89, the first two films' screenwriter Sam Hamm, who also serves as the comics' writer, confirmed that the latter two films take place in a diverging timeline and they are not building toward that fate.

== Bibliography ==
- Salisbury, Mark; Burton, Tim (2000). Burton on Burton. Faber and Faber. ISBN 0-57120-507-0.
