= Sound Ideas =

Canadian audio company

Sound Ideas Canada Ltd.
- Type: Private
- Industry: Recording
- Genre: Sound effects
- Founded: 1978; 48 years ago Toronto, Ontario, Canada
- Founder: Brian Nimens
- Headquarters: Richmond Hill, Ontario, Canada
- Key people: Brian Nimens, President and CEO
- Products: Sound effects collections Production music
- Owner: Brian Nimens
- Website: Sound-Ideas.com

Sound Ideas Canada Ltd. (also known as Sound Ideas) is a Canadian audio company and the archive of one of the largest commercially available sound effects libraries in the world. It has accumulated the sound effects, which it releases in collections by download or on CD and hard drive, through acquisition, exclusive arrangement with movie studios, and in-house production.

== Sound effects libraries ==
The company's first sound effects collection, the Series 1000, was released in 1979. The sound effects library includes thousands of effects ranging from adding machines to zebras, and the quality of its effects are regarded as excellent for theatrical use. In 1987, Sound Ideas released Series 2000 – a 22-CD set that was the world's first fully digital sound effect library. In 1990 the company released the Lucasfilm Series Sound Effects Library, the first collection of effects from a major motion picture studio to be released commercially. It has released sound effects libraries under exclusive arrangement with Lucasfilm (in collaboration with Skywalker Sound), as well as Hanna-Barbera, Warner Bros. Animation, 20th Century Fox, Universal Studios, Turner Entertainment, Disney, and Jay Ward Productions.

A stock sound effect of a cow taken from the Series 6000.

Its most well-known general collection, the Series 6000, provides more than 20,000 sound effects on 120 compact discs, and contains a variety of sound effects which can be added to film soundtracks during post-production. The company's sound effects are also used throughout the world in radio and television broadcasts and in many types of multimedia applications.

Sound Ideas also purchased the Digiffects SFX Library in May 2010, released the Frank Serafine SFX Library as their own in September 2015 and purchased the Mike McDonough SFX Library in August 2016.

Its flagship collection, the General HD, provides 46,423 high definition sound effects delivered on hard drive. Its largest collection, the Ultimate Hard Drive, provides more than 286,000 sound effects available on hard drive. Both contain a wide variety of sound effects which can be added to film soundtracks, TV shows, or video games and other media applications during post-production and come with worldwide licensing.

After long-time rival The Hollywood Edge (a former subsidiary of Todd Soundelux) filed for bankruptcy protection in 2014, Sound Ideas acquired the rights to The Hollywood Edge's sound libraries and began distributing them on its website.

== History ==
The company was started by Brian Nimens in 1978 as a 4-track recording studio which recorded dialog for commercials and added music and effects. Nimens built the sound effects library out of a desire to gain customers for the recording business, but elected to sell copies of the library beginning in the early 1980s.

Initially the library was produced on reel to reel tape, because the audio quality was superior to that which was available on vinyl record albums. In 1983, the company's collection was the first sound effects library released in the compact disc format. The company has since published more than 200 different sound effects and Royalty Free Music collections as well as hundreds of Royalty Free Music CDs under its own copyright. In the 21st century, everything from Sound Ideas is available digitally as a download or on hard drive.
