= Bruce Stambler =

American sound editor

- Occupation: Sound editor
- Years active: 1982-Present

Bruce Stambler is a sound editor. He won the Academy Award for Best Sound Editing for the drama thriller film The Ghost and the Darkness (1996). This marked both his first win and fifth consecutive nomination in the category, after being recognized for Under Siege (1992), The Fugitive (1993), Clear and Present Danger (1994) and Batman Forever (1995). His work on The Fugitive also earned him the BAFTA Award for Best Sound. In television, his work on the "Brother's Keeper" pilot episode of Miami Vice (1984–1989) earned him the Primetime Emmy Award for Outstanding Sound Editing for a One-Hour Series.

Stambler got into sound editing when he was working at Universal Studios. After working at various tasks, he was asked if he wanted to be an assistant sound editor. He agreed and eventually worked his way up to a position of supervisor.
